= List of compositions by Bill Evans =

This list contains the known compositions of Bill Evans. It is likely that some of his works have not survived or remain unpublished, such as "Very Little Suite," an assignment composed during his college years.

| Name | Year of composition | Year of first recording | First recording | Notes |
|---|---|---|---|---|
| Are You All the Things | | 1974 | Intuition | A contrafact based on Jerome Kern's classic "All the Things You Are," which rearranges the words of its title |
| B Minor Waltz | | 1977 | You Must Believe in Spring | For ex-girlfriend Ellaine, who committed suicide. |
| Bill's Belle | 1965–67 (appr.) | – | – | Posthumous |
| Bill's Hit Tune | | 1979 | We Will Meet Again | |
| Blue in Green | 1959 | 1959 | Kind of Blue | Miles Davis claimed authorship, but Evans, Earl Zindars, and many jazz historians have maintained that it was Evans who composed it (or at least co-wrote it). |
| C Minor Blues Chase | 1965–67 (appr.) | – | – | Posthumous |
| Carnival | 1965–67 (appr.) | – | – | Posthumous |
| Catch the Wind | 1965–67 (appr.) | – | – | Posthumous |
| Children's Play Song | | 1970 | From Left to Right | |
| Chromatic Tune | 1965–67 (appr.) | – | – | Posthumous |
| Comrade Conrad | | 1971 | The Bill Evans Album | The tune originated as a Crest toothpaste jingle. It was later elaborated and dedicated to Conrad Mendenhall, a friend who had died in a car accident. |
| Displacement | | 1956 | New Jazz Conceptions | |
| Epilogue | | 1959 | Everybody Digs Bill Evans | Short solo |
| Evanesque | | 1980 (unfinished) | | Completed and first recorded by Eliane Elias on her tribute album Something for You (2008) |
| Five | | 1956 | New Jazz Conceptions | Like many jazz tunes, it's based on the chords of "I Got Rhythm." It was for some years the Bill Evans Trio signature tune. |
| For Nenette | | 1978 | New Conversations | For Evans' wife. There is also a lyric version titled "In April" |
| Fudgesickle Built for Four | | 1962 | Loose Blues | Released in 1982 |
| Fun Ride | | 1962 | Loose Blues | Released in 1982 |
| Funkallero | | 1956 | Tenderly: An Informal Session | Recorded with Don Elliott and released posthumously in 2001 |
| Funny Man | | 1967 | Further Conversations with Myself | |
| G Waltz | | 1967 | California Here I Come | |
| Here Is Something for You | | 1980 (unfinished) | | From a private cassette recording; completed and recorded with added lyrics by Eliane Elias on her tribute album Something for You (2008) |
| Interplay | | 1962 | Interplay | |
| It's Love – It's Christmas | 1965–67 (appr.) | – | – | Posthumous, lyrics also by Bill Evans |
| Knit for Mary F | | 1980 | Letter to Evan | For fan Mary Franksen |
| Know What I Mean? | | 1961 | Know What I Mean? | Piece for Cannonball Adderley's homonymous album |
| Laurie | 1979 | 1979 | We Will Meet Again | For girlfriend Laurie Verchomin |
| Letter to Evan | | 1979 | The Paris Concert: Edition Two | Written for his son Evan Evans, born in 1975 |
| Loose Bloose | | 1962 | Loose Blues | Released in 1982 |
| Maxine | | 1978 | New Conversations | For his stepdaughter, Nenette's daughter |
| My Bells | | 1962 | Loose Blues | Released in 1982; first appeared on Bill Evans Trio with Symphony Orchestra in 1966 |
| N.Y.C.'s No Lark | 1963 | 1963 | Conversations with Myself | Anagram of the name of pianist Sonny Clark, a personal friend who died in 1963 |
| One For Helen | | 1966 | Bill Evans at Town Hall | For manager Helen Keane |
| Only Child | | | | |
| Orbit | | 1966 | A Simple Matter of Conviction | a.k.a. Unless It's You |
| Peace Piece | | 1958 | Everybody Digs Bill Evans | Improvised solo, loosely based on Leonard Bernstein's "Some Other Time" |
| Peri's Scope | | 1959 | Portrait in Jazz | For girlfriend Peri Cousins |
| Prologue | | 1966 | Bill Evans at Town Hall | Prologue to the solo titled "In Memory of His Father Harry L." |
| Re: Person I Knew | | 1962 | Moon Beams | Anagram of the name of his friend producer Orrin Keepnews |
| Remembering the Rain | | 1978 | New Conversations | |
| Show Type Tune | | 1962 | How My Heart Sings! | Recorded as "Tune for a Lyric" by artists including Bud Shank, Howard Alden, and Blue Connection Trio |
| A Simple Matter of Conviction | | 1966 | A Simple Matter of Conviction | |
| Since We Met | | 1974 | Since We Met | Dedicated to and titled by his wife Nanette |
| 34 Skidoo | | 1962 | How My Heart Sings! | |
| Song for Helen | | 1978 | New Conversations | For manager Helen Keane |
| Song No.1 | | | | First recorded by Chick Corea in 2010 |
| Story Line | | 1966 | Bill Evans at Town Hall | Part of the solo titled "In Memory of His Father Harry L." |
| Sugar Plum | | | | |
| The Opener | | | | |
| Theme (What You Gave) | 1965–67 (appr.) | – | – | Posthumous |
| There Came You | | 1962 | Loose Blues | Released in 1982 |
| These Things Called Changes | | 1966 | A Simple Matter of Conviction | |
| Tiffany | | 1980 | Turn Out the Stars: The Final Village Vanguard Recordings | For Joe LaBarbera's daughter |
| Time Out for Chris | | | | |
| Time Remembered | | 1962 | Loose Blues | Released in 1982; first appeared on Bill Evans Trio with Symphony Orchestra in 1966 |
| Turn Out the Stars | | 1966 | Bill Evans at Town Hall | First appeared in "In Memory of His Father Harry L.," an extended solo featuring other pieces; lyrics by Gene Lees |
| T.T.T. (Twelve Tone Tune) | | 1971 | The Bill Evans Album | Based on a tone row |
| T.T.T.T. (Twelve Tone Tune Two) | | 1973 | The Tokyo Concert | Based on a tone row |
| The Two Lonely People | | 1971 | The Bill Evans Album | Lyrics by Carol Hall for the performance of the song by Tony Bennett |
| Very Early | 1949 (appr.) | 1962 | Moon Beams | Evans's first-known tune composed when he was an undergraduate |
| Walkin' Up | | 1962 | How My Heart Sings! | |
| Waltz for Debby | 1953 (appr.) | 1956 | New Jazz Conceptions | Written for his then recently born niece; lyrics later added by Gene Lees |
| Waltz in E♭ | 1965–67 (appr.) | – | – | Posthumous |
| We Will Meet Again | | 1977 | You Must Believe in Spring | For his brother Harry; lyrics by Bill Evans (heard in recordings by others such as Tierney Sutton) |
| Yet Ne'er Broken | | | | An anagram of the name of cocaine dealer Robert Kenney |
| Your Story | | 1980 | Letter to Evan | |
