= Ultimate Bill Evans =

Compilation album by Bill Evans
- Released: August 25, 1998
- Genre: Jazz
- Length: 71:02
- Label: Verve Records
- Producer: Creed Taylor and Helen Keane

Bill Evans chronology
Piano Player (1998)	Ultimate Bill Evans (1998)	Bill Evans' Finest Hour (2001)

Professional ratings
Review scores
Source	Rating
AllMusic	3/5 stars

Ultimate Bill Evans is a compilation album by jazz musician, Bill Evans. All selections for this album were hand-picked by Herbie Hancock. The AllMusic review states that the Ultimate Bill Evans is a more than worthwhile introduction to Evans' mid-'60s work."

== Track listing ==
No.	Title	Writer(s)	Original album	Length
1.	"What Is This Thing Called Love?"	Cole Porter	Portrait in Jazz (1960)	4:47
2.	"'Round Midnight"	Cootie Williams; Thelonious Monk	Conversations with Myself (1963)	6:33
3.	"I Believe in You"	Frank Loesser	Empathy (1962)	5:51
4.	"Turn Out the Stars"	Bill Evans	Intermodulation (1966)	7:34
5.	"Funkallero"	Bill Evans	The Bill Evans Album (1971)	6:40
6.	"I Loves You, Porgy"	George Gershwin; Ira Gershwin	Bill Evans at the Montreux Jazz Festival (1968)	5:50
7.	"I Should Care"	Sammy Cahn; Axel Stordahl; Paul Weston	How My Heart Sings! (1964)	5:00
8.	"Angel Face"	Joe Zawinul	Intermodulation	6:33
9.	"Walkin' Up"	Bill Evans	Bill Evans at the Montreux Jazz Festival	3:31
10.	"N.Y.C.'s No Lark"	Bill Evans	Conversations with Myself	5:34
11.	"Mother of Earl"	Earl Zindars	Bill Evans at the Montreux Jazz Festival	4:58
12.	"Jazz Samba"	Claus Ogerman	Intermodulation	3:07
13.	"A Time for Love"	Johnny Mandel; Paul Francis Webster	Alone (1970)	5:04
Total length:				71:02

All track information and credits were taken from the CD liner notes.
