= New Conversations =

Studio album by Bill Evans
- Released: 1978
- Recorded: January 26 – February 16, 1978
- Genre: Jazz
- Label: Warner Bros.
- Producer: Helen Keane

Bill Evans chronology
You Must Believe in Spring (1977)	New Conversations (1978)	Affinity (1978)

New Conversations is an album by the American jazz pianist Bill Evans, released by Warner Bros. in 1978.

It is Evans' third and final release in which he overdubs different keyboard tracks with previously played ones. The first release recorded in this manner was Conversations with Myself (1963) followed by Further Conversations with Myself (1967).

A noteworthy difference in this release is that Evans plays the Fender Rhodes electric piano as well as his customary acoustic piano.

The liner notes for the album were written by the noted jazz critic Nat Hentoff. In them, he says, "As you will hear, Bill does not let the technology of multi-tracking dominate him in the least. This is a thoroughly musical, not at all mechanical, achievement."

== Background ==
This album was recorded during an interim period between Evans' trios with bassists Eddie Gómez and Marc Johnson. A projected recording with Johnny Mandel had fallen through, and Evans was about to head out on the road with Philly Joe Jones and his temporary bassist Michael Moore. The album was recorded several months after his first Warner Bros. recording, You Must Believe in Spring, but released well before it and not well promoted or distributed, much to the pianist's disappointment.

== Repertoire ==
In his final period, Evans composed prolifically. This album includes four new originals and four pieces by other composers. Three of Evans' new pieces were explicitly written for people in his life. "Song for Helen" honored his manager, Helen Keane, for whom he had earlier written "One for Helen" (which appears on the At Town Hall recording). Peter Pettinger notes that "Song for Helen" has certain elements in common with Scriabin's Prelude, Op. 74/1, which "Evans knew well" and played in private. (Evans had previously recorded a jazz version of Scriabin's Prelude, Op. 11/15, on an album with Claus Ogerman.) "Song for Helen" was later recorded by guitarist John McLaughlin (1993) and the French classical pianist Jean-Yves Thibaudet (1997), who added an allusion to Chopin's Berceuse at the end.

"Maxine" was written for Evans' 11-year-old stepdaughter and "For Nenette" for his wife, at a time when their marriage was falling apart because of the pianist's return to heavy drug use. The sequencing on the album follows "For Nenette" with Cy Coleman's "I Love My Wife." The Brazilian pianist-singer Eliane Elias later recorded these same tunes back-to-back also on her acclaimed Evans tribute album but flipped the order.

The fourth original is "Remembering the Rain." Evans never revisited these new pieces, not even in his many live recordings currently available, but pianist Fred Hersch later covered "Remembering the Rain" (1990). Two jazz standards are also included, "Nobody Else but Me" by Jerome Kern (although misattributed in the album's credits to "Andrew Sterling, Bartley Costello") and "After You" by Cole Porter.

The final piece on the album is Duke Ellington's "Reflections in D" from his 1953 trio album The Duke Plays Ellington (aka Piano Reflections). Evans plays it as an acoustic solo (not overdubbed) and expands it to twice its original length. He also recorded a shorter solo version of it during his celebrated NPR interview with Marian McPartland. Evans said of the piece, "I can't imagine something this beautiful not being better known." It was little-known at this time, but after Evans revived it, a number of other notable pianists went on to record it, including Bobo Stenson (1983), Roland Hanna (1991), McPartland (1994), Thibaudet (1997), Ellis Marsalis (1999), Richie Beirach (2008), and Frank Kimbrough (2010).

== Reception ==
Professional ratings
Review scores
Source	Rating
AllMusic	3/5 stars
The Rolling Stone Jazz Record Guide	3/5 stars
The Penguin Guide to Jazz Recordings	3/4 stars

The AllMusic review by Scott Yanow awarded the album three out of five stars, saying, "The results are less memorable than one might expect for Bill Evans seemed always at his best in trio settings."

By contrast, Peter Pettinger refers to the album as a "radiant collection" in which the pianist's control over multitracked lines had actually improved over his past efforts. He also singled out the performance of "Reflections in D" for its "visionary depth."

== Track listing ==
All songs by Bill Evans unless otherwise noted.

1. "Song for Helen" – 7:48
2. "Nobody Else but Me" (Oscar Hammerstein II, Jerome Kern) – 4:38
3. "Maxine" – 4:40
4. "For Nenette" – 7:19
5. "I Love My Wife" (Cy Coleman, Michael Stewart) – 6:43
6. "Remembering the Rain" – 4:29
7. "After You" (Cole Porter) – 3:39
8. "Reflections in D" (Duke Ellington) – 7:00

== Personnel ==
- Bill Evans – acoustic piano and Fender Rhodes electric piano

== Production ==
- Helen Keane – producer
- Frank Laico – engineer, mixing
- Nat Hentoff – liner notes

== Chart positions ==
Year	Chart	Position
1978	Billboard Jazz Albums	35
