= We Will Meet Again =

Studio album by Bill Evans
- Released: 1980
- Recorded: August 6–9, 1979; New York City
- Genre: Jazz
- Length: 61:33
- Label: Warner Bros.
- Producer: Helen Keane

Bill Evans chronology
Affinity (1978)	We Will Meet Again (1980)	The Paris Concert: Edition One (1979)

We Will Meet Again is a quintet album by jazz pianist Bill Evans, released by Warner Bros. in 1980. It is Evans' last studio recording and the only one that features his final trio with Marc Johnson on bass and Joe LaBarbera on drums. (The playing of that trio, though, is copiously documented on live recordings). In this quintet setting, the group is rounded out by Tom Harrell on trumpet and Larry Schneider, who had also appeared on the album Affinity, on tenor saxophone, soprano saxophone, and alto flute. Evans plays both acoustic and electric pianos.

On the back cover of the album appear the words "In Loving Dedication to My Late Brother, Harry L. Evans 1927-1979." Harry Evans, who was suffering from schizophrenia, had committed suicide earlier that year. He had been a music educator and an accomplished pianist in his own right. Biographer Peter Pettinger notes that Bill Evans "loved and admired his older brother unconditionally, and he took his suicide very hard."

Keith Shadwick says that at this time, Evans' own physical condition was "visibly deteriorating" but that "[p]aradoxically, he was playing with more inner forcefulness of purpose than at any time since his earliest years on the jazz scene."

== Repertoire ==
Seven of the album's eight tracks are compositions by the pianist; the other is the jazz standard "For All We Know," which is pointedly subtitled "(We May Never Meet Again)." Two Evans pieces debuted here: "Bill's Hit Tune," which Shadwick feels is closely modeled on Michel Legrand's compositional techniques, and "Laurie," written for his new girlfriend, a Canadian waitress named Laurie Verchomin. Pettinger notes that this piece is "a fine example of the composer's way with mutually supportive melody and harmony" and that in his solo, Evans "penetrated the upper echelons of the keyboard like a delicate glistening rainbow." Only slightly more than a year later, Verchomin and LaBarbera were in the car with Evans when he suffered what proved to be a fatal hemorrhage.

"Laurie" has gone on to become one of Evans' better-known tunes from his final years: It is included in The Hal Leonard Real Jazz Book and has been covered a number of times, most notably by Chick Corea with former Evans trio members Eddie Gómez and Paul Motian on the album Further Explorations (2012, its title playing off that of the classic Evans album Explorations). Corea wrote that the piece is a "haunting, beautiful ballad" with "harmonic twists and the trademark Bill Evans melancholia that allows for different avenues for personal interpretation."

The other Evans compositions here, "Comrade Conrad," "Five," "Only Child," and "Peri's Scope," are of earlier vintage. The title song, "We Will Meet Again," was first recorded two years earlier for the album You Must Believe in Spring, where it is explicitly subtitled "(For Harry)." (That album was recorded before Harry's suicide but released after it and after this album.) Here, Evans takes both "For All We Know (We May Never Meet Again)" and "We Will Meet Again" as a matched pair of brief piano solos.

"We Will Meet Again" is another of Evans' better-known later compositions and has been covered by McCoy Tyner, Fred Hersch, John McLaughlin, and many others.

== Quintets ==
This recording was Evans' fifth quintet album as a leader to be released, following Interplay (1963), Quintessence (1977), Crosscurrents (1978), and Affinity (1979). After Evans' death, another quintet album recorded in the early 1960s, Loose Blues, was also released, although very much against the pianist's wishes, as he had been extremely dissatisfied with the results of those sessions.

== Reception ==
Professional ratings
Review scores
Source	Rating
AllMusic	4/5 stars
The Penguin Guide to Jazz Recordings	3/4 stars
The Rolling Stone Jazz Record Guide	4/5 stars

At the Grammy Awards of 1981, held after the pianist's death, Evans' earlier trio album I Will Say Goodbye won the Grammy Award for Best Jazz Instrumental Solo and We Will Meet Again won the Grammy Award for Best Jazz Instrumental Album.

Scott Yanow's AllMusic review says, "The thoughtful session is full of lyrical melodies and strong solos; even Evans' electric keyboard work on a few tunes is distinctive."

Shadwick summarizes his view of the album by saying that despite some "flat spots ... it amounts to a heavyweight emotional experience and is virtually flawless in execution."

== Track listing ==
All tracks by Bill Evans except where noted.

1. "Comrade Conrad" – 10:05
2. "Laurie" – 8:20
3. "Bill's Hit Tune" – 10:49
4. "For All We Know (We May Never Meet Again)" (J. Fred Coots, Sam M. Lewis) – 3:37
5. "Five" – 9:10
6. "Only Child" – 10:47
7. "Peri's Scope" – 6:11
8. "We Will Meet Again" – 2:34

== Personnel ==
Credits adapted from AllMusic.

- Bill Evans – acoustic piano, electric piano (solo on tracks 4 & 8)
- Tom Harrell – trumpet
- Larry Schneider – tenor saxophone, soprano saxophone, alto flute
- Marc Johnson – bass
- Joe LaBarbera – drums

Production

- Helen Keane – producer
- Frank Laico – engineer, mixing
- Aram Gesar – photography
- Stew Romaine – mastering
- Chris Callis – photography
- Lee Herschberg – digital mastering (CD reissue)

== Charts ==
Year	Chart	Position
1980	Billboard Jazz Albums	36
