= Eloquence (disambiguation) =

Eloquence is fluent, forcible, elegant or persuasive speaking.

Eloquence or eloquent may also refer to:

- Eloquence (Bill Evans album)
- Eloquence (Oscar Peterson album)
- Eloquence (Wolfgang Flür album)
- Eloquence, Internet and Wikipedia pen name of Erik Möller (born 1979), German freelance journalist, software developer and author
- Eloquent (The SWORD Project), a Bible research and study open-source application, part of The SWORD Project

== See also ==
- Fluency, the property of a person or of a system that delivers information quickly and with expertise.
