= Letter to Evan =

Live album by Bill Evans
- Released: 1994
- Recorded: July 21, 1980
- Genre: Jazz
- Length: 53:43
- Label: Dreyfus Jazz

Bill Evans chronology
The Solo Sessions, Vol. 2 (1992)	Letter to Evan (1994)	Turn Out the Stars (1994)

Letter to Evan is a live album by jazz pianist Bill Evans with Marc Johnson and Joe LaBarbera recorded at Ronnie Scott's Jazz Club in 1980 about two months before his death. It was released on the Dreyfus Jazz label.

== Reception ==
The Allmusic review by Scott Yanow awarded the album 4 stars and states "Evans is heard with one of his finest trios... in surprisingly enthusiastic and creative form; there is no hint that the end is near... Easily recommended for true Bill Evans fans".

Professional ratings
Review scores
Source	Rating
Allmusic	4/5 stars

== Track listing ==
All compositions by Bill Evans except as indicated

1. "Emily" (Johnny Mandel, Johnny Mercer) - 5:33
2. "Days of Wine and Roses" (Henry Mancini, Mercer) - 8:25
3. "Knit for Mary F." - 6:07
4. "Like Someone in Love" (Johnny Burke, Jimmy Van Heusen) - 7:06
5. "Your Story" - 3:56
6. "Stella by Starlight" (Ned Washington, Victor Young) - 8:26
7. "My Man's Gone Now" (George Gershwin, Ira Gershwin, DuBose Heyward) - 6:07
8. "Letter to Evan" - 8:03

- Recorded at Ronnie Scott's Jazz Club in London, England on July 21, 1980

== Personnel ==
- Bill Evans - piano
- Marc Johnson - bass
- Joe LaBarbera - drums
