= A Simple Matter of Conviction =

Studio album by Bill Evans
- Released: January 1967
- Recorded: October 4, 1966
- Studio: Van Gelder Studio, Englewood Cliffs, New Jersey
- Genre: Jazz
- Length: 37:36
- Label: Verve; V6-6785
- Producer: Creed Taylor

Bill Evans chronology
Intermodulation (1966)	A Simple Matter of Conviction (1967)	Further Conversations with Myself (1967)

A Simple Matter of Conviction is an album by jazz pianist Bill Evans, released in 1967 on Verve. It's the second and last collaboration between Evans and Shelly Manne after their 1962 Empathy album.

== Reception ==
Professional ratings
Review scores
Source	Rating
Allmusic	4/5 stars
DownBeat	3/5 stars
The Rolling Stone Jazz Record Guide	4/5 stars

Writing for Allmusic, music critic Bob Rusch wrote of the album: "What separated this from the average good Bill Evans date was the inclusion of Shelly Manne on drums, who inventively pushed and took unexpected chances."

== Track listing ==
1. "A Simple Matter of Conviction" (Bill Evans) - 3:18
2. "Stella by Starlight" (Washington, Young) - 4:10
3. "Unless It's You (Orbit)" (Evans) - 3:42
4. "Laura" (Mercer, Raksin) - 4:20
5. "My Melancholy Baby" (Ernie Burnett, George Norton, W. E. Watson) - 5:16
6. "I'm Getting Sentimental Over You" (Bassman, Washington) - 4:13
7. "Star Eyes" (Gene de Paul, Don Raye) - 4:59
8. "Only Child" (Evans) - 4:05
9. "These Things Called Changes" (Evans) - 3:33

== Credits ==
- Bill Evans - piano
- Eddie Gómez - bass
- Shelly Manne - drums
