= California Here I Come (album) =

Live album by Bill Evans
- Released: 1982
- Recorded: August 17–18, 1967
- Venue: Village Vanguard, New York City
- Genre: Jazz
- Length: 74:34
- Label: Verve; VE2-2545
- Producer: Helen Keane

Bill Evans chronology
Further Conversations with Myself (1967)	California Here I Come (1982)	Bill Evans at the Montreux Jazz Festival (1968)

Professional ratings
Review scores
Source	Rating
All About Jazz	(no rating)
Allmusic	4/5 stars
The Penguin Guide to Jazz Recordings	3.5/4 stars

California Here I Come is a live album by jazz pianist Bill Evans. It was recorded in 1967, but not released on the Verve label until 1982 as a double LP. It peaked at number 12 on the Billboard Jazz Album charts in 1983 and was reissued on CD in 2004. The pieces were recorded at the Village Vanguard, where Evans had previously recorded the sets that appeared on the highly influential Waltz for Debby and Sunday at the Village Vanguard, both later comprised on the definitive collection The Complete Village Vanguard Recordings, 1961.

== Track listing ==
1. "California, Here I Come" (Buddy DeSylva, Al Jolson, Joseph Meyer) – 5:32
2. "Polka Dots and Moonbeams" (Jimmy Van Heusen, Johnny Burke) – 3:22
3. "Turn Out the Stars" (Bill Evans) – 5:52
4. "Stella by Starlight" (Ned Washington, Victor Young) – 4:06
5. "You're Gonna Hear From Me" (André Previn, Dory Previn) – 4:57
6. "In a Sentimental Mood" (Duke Ellington, Irving Mills, Manny Kurtz) – 3:53
7. "G Waltz" (Bill Evans) – 4:35
8. "On Green Dolphin Street" (Bronisław Kaper, Ned Washington) – 4:53
9. "Gone With the Wind" (Herb Magidson, Allie Wrubel) – 5:35
10. "If You Could See Me Now" (Tadd Dameron, Carl Sigman) – 3:39
11. "Alfie" (Burt Bacharach, Hal David) – 5:12
12. "Very Early" (Bill Evans) – 4:44
13. "'Round Midnight" (Thelonious Monk, Cootie Williams, Bernie Hanighen) - 6:07
14. "Emily" (Johnny Mandel, Johnny Mercer) – 5:18
15. "Wrap Your Troubles in Dreams (And Dream Your Troubles Away)" (Harry Barris, Ted Koehler, Billy Moll) – 6:49

== Personnel ==
- Bill Evans - piano
- Eddie Gómez - bass
- Philly Joe Jones - drums

2004 reissue production notes

- Produced by Bryan Koniarz
- Mastered by Bob Irwin and Jayme Pieruzzi
- Production assistance by Mark Smith
- Executive producer: Ken Druker
- Cover art by Tom Christopher
