= Turn Out the Stars =

Live album by Bill Evans
- Released: 1994
- Recorded: August 2, 1980
- Genre: Jazz
- Length: 44:09
- Label: Dreyfus Jazz

Bill Evans chronology
Letter to Evan (1994)	Turn Out the Stars (1994)	But Beautiful (1996)

Turn Out the Stars is a live album by jazz pianist Bill Evans with Marc Johnson and Joe LaBarbera recorded at Ronnie Scott's Jazz Club in London in 1980 and released on the Dreyfus Jazz label.

== Reception ==
The Allmusic review by Scott Yanow awarded the album 3 stars and states "the innovative and highly influential pianist is in fine form, emphasizing more introspective material... Although it does not reach the emotional heights of his slightly earlier Dreyfus set Letter to Evan and the Warner Bros. box, this music should be of great interest to Bill Evans collectors".

Professional ratings
Review scores
Source	Rating
Allmusic	3/5 stars

== Track listing ==
All compositions by Bill Evans except as indicated

1. "I Do It for Your Love" (Paul Simon) - 5:31
2. "Turn Out the Stars" - 7:06
3. "My Romance" (Lorenz Hart, Richard Rodgers) -7:51
4. "Laurie" - 7:16
5. "The Two Lonely People" (Bill Evans, Carol Hall) - 6:12
6. "Peau Douce" (Steve Swallow) - 6:00
7. "But Beautiful" (Johnny Burke, Jimmy Van Heusen) - 4:13

- Recorded at Ronnie Scott's Jazz Club in London, England on August 2, 1980

== Personnel ==
- Bill Evans - piano
- Marc Johnson - bass
- Joe LaBarbera - drums
