= Lucy Reed =

American jazz musician

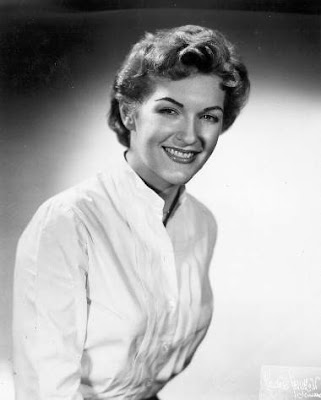
- Born: Lucille Magdalyn Dollinger; January 14, 1921; Marshfield, Wisconsin, U.S.
- Died: July 1, 1998 (age 77); Chicago, Illinois, U.S.
- Other name: Lucy Reed Seymour
- Occupation: Jazz singer
- Spouses: Joseph Alphonse "Joey" DeRidder (m. 1941-1944; his death, 1 child); Serge Seymour (m. 1957, div. 1968, 2 children)
- Children: Jeffrey DeRidder (born 1942); Ted; Steven
- Parents: Max Dollinger; Elizabeth Shields
- Website: https://lucyreed.com/

Lucy Reed (January 14, 1921 – July 1, 1998), born Lucille Magdalyn Dollinger, was an American jazz and blues singer, active in the Chicago jazz scene in the 1950s.

== Early life ==
Reed was born in Marshfield, Wisconsin, the daughter of Max Dollinger, (June 7, 1899 - October 4, 1995), a machine operator from Germany and Elizabeth Shields Dollinger (later Jetty) (March 21, 1899 - July 7, 1987). Her parents divorced in 1934, and later remarried. As a teenager attending Humboldt High School in St. Paul, Minnesota, Reed sang on KSTP radio with a group of four girls, earning $5 per week.

== Career ==
Reed gained a reputation in the Chicago jazz scene, singing with bands such as the Woody Herman orchestra and the Charlie Ventura orchestra. She also performed at various venues such as the Lei Aloha Club in Chicago, Mister Kelly's in Chicago, and the Village Vanguard in New York City. She also sang with the Jerry Salone Orchestra in Michigan. She met her first husband, jazz drummer Joey DeRidder, while living in Iron Mountain, Michigan, performing with his musical group, the Joey DeRidder Orchestra. In 1955, she performed with Bill Evans in New York City, in Miami in 1956, and with Dick Marx and Johnny Frigo in 1957.

A 1956 reviewer in Down Beat described Reed as "a singer who may possess too much innate feeling for lyrics, and honesty in delivery, ever to have a hit record, but who should be able to cultivate a flock of enthusiastic listeners."

== Personal life and death ==
Reed married Joseph Alphonse DeRidder in June 1941, giving birth to a son, Jeffrey, born in 1942. DeRidder was killed in action while co-piloting a B-17 over Munich, Germany on July 31, 1944. She married her second husband, Serge Seymour, in 1957; they had two sons, Steven and Ted. After her retirement from professional singing, Reed continued to do occasional singing performances until her death in 1998 from cancer at the age of 77. Chicago jazz musicians including Audrey Morris and Frank D'Rone came to her deathbed, to sing to her in her final hours.

== Discography ==
- The Singing Reed (Fantasy, 1957)
- This Is Lucy Reed (Fantasy, 1957)
- Basic Reeding (Audiophile, 1994)
