= Bill Evans at Town Hall =

Live album by The Bill Evans Trio
- Released: 1966
- Recorded: February 21, 1966
- Venue: The Town Hall, New York City
- Genre: Jazz
- Length: 35:12
- Label: Verve

The Bill Evans Trio chronology
Bill Evans Trio with Symphony Orchestra (1966)	Bill Evans at Town Hall (1966)	Intermodulation (1966)

Bill Evans at Town Hall is a live album from 1966 by American jazz pianist Bill Evans and his trio. It is his only commercial trio recording featuring drummer Arnold Wise, and it was the last recorded appearance of bassist Chuck Israels as a regular member of the trio.

The recording was released as "Volume 1," but no subsequent volume appeared. A planned release of big-band material, featuring Evans, from the second half of the concert ended up being nixed, as according to Evans's manager, Helen Keane, the pianist "did not play his best" during that part of the program.

The original LP consisted of four trio performances of jazz standards followed by a lengthy solo elegy for Evans's recently deceased father. Verve Records released the album on CD in 1986 with three additional trio performances, including the first recording of Evans's composition "One for Helen," dedicated to his manager.

== Arnold Wise ==
Israels highly valued the contributions of drummer Arnold Wise, who had joined the trio after Larry Bunker's departure, saying, "He's like a catalytic drummer, instigating nothing but taking everything in his musical surroundings and gluing it together, melding the elements." However, Wise disliked travel and, according to Peter Pettinger, "remained uncommitted to the job." Wise did later rejoin the Bill Evans Trio for six months, including a European tour. Some additional trio recordings with "Arnie" Wise were eventually released by Milestone Records in 1996 on the 8-CD set The Secret Sessions, and his playing on these was highly praised by Pettinger. Evans worked with various other drummers in the late '60s, including Philly Joe Jones and Jack DeJohnette, before finally achieving stability in this respect with Marty Morell starting in late 1968.

== Reception ==
Professional ratings
Review scores
Source	Rating
AllMusic	4/5 stars
DownBeat	4.5/5 stars
The Rolling Stone Jazz Record Guide	5/5 stars
The Penguin Guide to Jazz Recordings	3.5/4 stars

Writing for AllMusic, music critic Scott Yanow called the album "a superior effort by Bill Evans and his trio in early 1966. ... [T]his live set features the group mostly performing lyrical and thoughtful standards. ... However the most memorable piece is the 13½-minute 'Solo - In Memory of His Father,' an extensive unaccompanied exploration by Evans that partly uses a theme that became 'Turn Out the Stars.'"

The lengthy solo also features a newly composed "Prologue," somewhat reminiscent of Satie and Debussy, an elaborated version of "Re: Person I Knew," now titled "Story Line," and a closing "Epilogue" drawn from the 1958 album Everybody Digs Bill Evans. Keith Shadwick highly praised this solo Evans performance for its "great intensity and almost infinite gradations of feeling, touch, tone, rhythmic adjustments and emphases. The overall mood of the music is elegiac, the melancholy at its heart becoming progressively darker and more intense until, touching despair, it is resolved by the enigmatic 'Epilogue,' newly poignant in its latest role."

Evans biographer Peter Pettinger notes that "'Turn Out the Stars' was to endure and to become arguably Evans's second-greatest classic after 'Waltz for Debby.'"

== 'Turn Out the Stars' ==
Evans composed "Turn Out the Stars" with lyrics by his friend Gene Lees, who had also contributed the words for "Waltz for Debby." Lees said the title was inspired by an old movie called Turn Off the Moon. Contrary to widespread belief, the piece was not originally composed in connection with the death of Evans's father; it was only used that way later on this album. The piece remained an integral part of Evans's repertoire until the end of his career, with notable later standalone recordings (i.e., not part of the suite for his father) appearing on the albums Intermodulation with Jim Hall and the live trio recording Since We Met. There are also many later live Evans trio recordings of it in circulation, released after the pianist's death, including no fewer than 14 versions with his final trio during just the last year of his life.

This signature piece has subsequently been covered many times by other notable jazz artists, including Clare Fischer (1987), David Benoit (1989), Gary Burton and Paul Bley (1990), Fred Hersch (1991), Lee Konitz (1993), John McLaughlin (1993), Art Farmer (1994), Herbie Mann (1995), Dave Grusin (2010), and Chick Corea (2011); in addition, transcriptions of the piece have been recorded by classical artists, including the Kronos Quartet (1986) and Jean-Yves Thibaudet (1997), who frequently played it in recitals as an encore.

Evans never recorded a version of the piece with a vocalist, and Lees noted that the melody is "dark" and "very hard to sing." A vocal performance appears on Tierney Sutton's tribute album Blue in Green from 2001.

== Track listing ==
=== Side one ===
1. "I Should Care" (Sammy Cahn, Axel Stordahl, Paul Weston) – 5:30
2. "Spring Is Here" (Richard Rodgers, Lorenz Hart) – 5:00
3. "Who Can I Turn To?" (Leslie Bricusse, Anthony Newley) – 6:17

=== Side two ===
1. "Make Someone Happy" (Betty Comden, Adolph Green, Jule Styne) – 4:45
2. "Solo - In Memory of His Father Harry L. (Prologue/Improvisation on Two Themes/Story Line/Turn Out the Stars/Epilogue)" (Evans) – 13:40

=== Reissue ===
1. "I Should Care" (Sammy Cahn, Axel Stordahl, Paul Weston) – 5:30
2. "Spring Is Here" (Richard Rodgers, Lorenz Hart) – 5:00
3. "Who Can I Turn To?" (Leslie Bricusse, Anthony Newley) – 6:17
4. "Make Someone Happy" (Betty Comden, Adolph Green, Jule Styne) – 4:45
5. "Solo - In Memory of His Father Harry L. (Prologue/Story Line/Turn Out the Stars/Epilogue)" (Evans) – 13:40
6. "Beautiful Love" (Haven Gillespie, Wayne King, Egbert Van Alstyne, Victor Young) – 6:56
7. "My Foolish Heart" (Ned Washington, Victor Young) – 4:51
8. "One for Helen" (Evans) – 5:51

== Structure of the solo ==
The lengthy solo performance "Solo - In Memory of His Father Harry L." is essentially a suite, consisting of four discrete parts:

1. "Prologue" (0:00–2:39) [first recording]
2. "Story Line" aka "Re: Person I Knew" (2:40–7:30) [first recorded on the album Moon Beams]
3. "Turn Out the Stars" (7:31–12:28) [first recording]
4. "Epilogue" (12:29–13:09) [first recorded on the album Everybody Digs Bill Evans]

(The remainder of the track consists of applause.)

== Personnel ==
- Bill Evans – piano
- Chuck Israels – bass (except track 5)
- Arnold Wise – drums (except track 5)

== Chart positions ==
Year	Chart	Position
1967	Billboard Jazz Albums	12
