= Bill Evans at the Montreux Jazz Festival =

1968 live album by Bill Evans

Live album by Bill Evans
- Released: 1968 (see 1968 in music)
- Recorded: June 15, 1968
- Venue: Montreux Jazz Festival, Casino de Montreux, Switzerland
- Genre: Jazz
- Length: 58:59
- Label: Verve
- Producer: Helen Keane

Bill Evans chronology
| California Here I Come (1967) | Bill Evans at the Montreux Jazz Festival (1968) | Alone (1968) |

Bill Evans at the Montreux Jazz Festival is a 1968 album by the American jazz pianist Bill Evans with bassist Eddie Gómez and drummer Jack DeJohnette, recorded live at that year's Montreux Jazz Festival. The trio's performance on this album won them the 1969 Grammy Award for Best Jazz Instrumental Album, Individual or Group.

== Reception ==
Professional ratings
Review scores
| Source | Rating |
|---|---|
| Allmusic | 4/5 stars |
| The Penguin Guide to Jazz Recordings | 3.5/4 stars |

Writing for AllMusic, music critic Rovi Staff wrote the album "marks the beginning of stylistic changes for the legendary pianist. Only one year earlier, his At Town Hall release found his approach generally more introspective and brooding. In contrast, this set is more lively, playful, and experimental. ... He experiments more with harmonic dissonance and striking rhythmical contrasts, making this his most extroverted playing since his freshman release, New Jazz Conceptions."

== Track listing ==
1. "Spoken Introduction" – 0:57
2. "One for Helen" (Bill Evans) – 4:22
3. "A Sleepin' Bee" (Harold Arlen, Truman Capote) – 6:05
4. "Mother of Earl" (Earl Zindars) – 5:14
5. "Nardis" (Miles Davis) – 8:23
6. "Quiet Now" (Denny Zeitlin) – 6:26
7. "I Loves You, Porgy" (George Gershwin, Ira Gershwin, DuBose Heyward) – 6:00
8. "The Touch of Your Lips" (Ray Noble) – 4:45
9. "Embraceable You" (George Gershwin, Ira Gershwin) – 6:45
10. "Some Day My Prince Will Come" (Frank Churchill, Larry Morey) – 6:08
11. "Walkin' Up" (Evans) – 3:34

== Personnel ==
- Bill Evans - piano
- Eddie Gómez - double bass
- Jack DeJohnette - drums

== Legacy ==
Nardis in Track 5 was sampled by MF Doom in "Raid" from his album, Madvillainy.
