= Interplay (Bill Evans album) =

1963 studio album by Bill Evans Trio

Studio album by Bill Evans Trio
- Released: June 1963
- Recorded: July 16 & 17, 1962
- Studios: Sound Makers Studio, New York City
- Genre: Jazz
- Length: 45:27
- Labels: Riverside; RLP-445
- Producer: Orrin Keepnews

Bill Evans Trio chronology
| How My Heart Sings! (1962) | Interplay (1963) | Empathy (1962) |

Interplay is a 1963 album by jazz musician Bill Evans. It was recorded in July 1962 in New York City for Riverside Records. The Interplay Sessions is a 1982 Milestone album that includes the entirety of this album, and tracks recorded for Riverside on August 21 and 22 of the same year with a different lineup (with Zoot Sims and Ron Carter, and without Freddie Hubbard and Percy Heath). The Interplay Sessions peaked at number 26 on the Billboard Jazz Albums charts in 1983. The CD reissue Interplay adds another take of "I'll Never Smile Again" as a bonus track. At the Grammy Awards of 1984, Orrin Keepnews won the Grammy Award for Best Album Notes for the reissue.

== Reception ==
Professional ratings
Review scores
| Source | Rating |
|---|---|
| AllMusic | 4/5 stars |
| The Rolling Stone Jazz Record Guide | 5/5 stars |
| The Penguin Guide to Jazz Recordings | 3/4 stars |

Writing for AllMusic, music critic Scott Yanow called the album "Excellent music."

== Track listing ==
1. "You and the Night and the Music" (Howard Dietz, Arthur Schwartz) – 7:04
2. "When You Wish upon a Star" (Leigh Harline, Ned Washington) – 5:45
3. "I'll Never Smile Again" [take 7; original take] (Ruth Lowe) – 6:32
4. "I'll Never Smile Again" [take 6] – 6:38 [on CD reissue only]
5. "Interplay" (Bill Evans) – 8:14
6. "You Go to My Head" (J. Fred Coots, Haven Gillespie) – 5:06
7. "Wrap Your Troubles in Dreams (And Dream Your Troubles Away)" (Harry Barris, Ted Koehler, Billy Moll) – 6:24

== Personnel ==
- Bill Evans - piano
- Freddie Hubbard - trumpet
- Jim Hall - guitar
- Percy Heath - bass
- Philly Joe Jones - drums

== Charts ==
Chart performance for Interplay
| Chart (2025) | Peak position |
|---|---|
| US Top Jazz Albums (Billboard) | 23 |
