= Time Remembered =

"Time Remembered" is a jazz standard composed by jazz pianist Bill Evans.

Evans biographer Keith Shadwick says that it is "one of Evans's deeply-felt ballads, its strong melody arising from a very busy harmonic pattern, recalling music by Rachmaninov and Chopin." American jazz pianist Jack Reilly says that the work is influenced by both the sixteenth century modal works of the polyphonist masters (Palestrina, Byrd, Frescobaldi, etc.) and the works of impressionist composers (Debussy and Ravel).

== Recordings by Bill Evans ==
It was recorded for the first time in 1962 with a quintet featuring Zoot Sims for the album Loose Blues, which was released only posthumously in 1982. According to pianist Warren Bernhardt, though, Evans had said to him, "God, I hope they never release those tapes after I die!" Nonetheless, Evans biographer and classical pianist Peter Pettinger praised this recording: "The mellow lyricism of 'Time Remembered' evoked a warm response from Sims."

The first release of a recording of "Time Remembered" wasn't until 1966 on the album Bill Evans Trio with Symphony Orchestra with an orchestration by Claus Ogerman. Other earlier recordings eventually came to light, including a trio recording from 1963 with Chuck Israels and Larry Bunker, released by Milestone in 1983, and trio and solo recordings from November 1965 in Copenhagen, released on the 2-CD set Treasures in 2023.

Various later live trio versions of the piece exist, notably the one from 1974 on the album Since We Met with Eddie Gómez and Marty Morell. Evans's final recording of it dates from 6 June 1980, which appeared posthumously on the 6-CD set Turn Out the Stars: The Final Village Vanguard Recordings. Although many Evans recordings of "Time Remembered" are currently available, only two were authorized for release by the pianist during his lifetime: the one with Ogerman and the live trio version from the Village Vanguard from 1974.

Producer Bruce Spiegel's 2015 documentary about Evans aptly takes its title from this composition, and it begins with a video recording of Evans playing this piece solo.

== Recordings by others ==
The piece has been recorded by various other artists, including Oregon (1977), the Kronos Quartet (1985), Fred Hersch (1990), John McLaughlin (1993), Chick Corea with Gary Burton (2012), the Jim Norton Collective (2013), and Joey Alexander (2018). In 1994, Paul Lewis added lyrics to the piece, although it's challenging to sing because of the wide intervals, ranging upward to a high C-sharp, a note associated more with opera than with popular standards. The vocal version was recorded by Kendra Shank for her album Mosaic (Challenge, 2009) with pianist Frank Kimbrough.

== Harmonic analysis ==
The work is built over four modes, dorian, phrygian, lydian, and aeolian, and is notable for lacking dominant-like seventh chords, thus using only major and minor chords and their extensions (and employing many added 9ths, 11ths, and 13ths). According to Reilly, these two factors give the work a modal and impressionistic flavor. Shadwick notes that the piece "moves unexpectedly in its harmony and has an unusually long verse structure, forcing the soloist to concentrate hard on his shifting position within the maze."
