= Conversations with Myself (album) =

1963 studio album by Bill Evans

Studio album by Bill Evans
- Released: 1963
- Recorded: February 6, 9 and May 20, 1963; New York City
- Genre: Jazz
- Length: 36:43 (original LP); 43:49 (CD reissue)
- Label: Verve; V6-8526
- Producer: Creed Taylor

Bill Evans chronology
The Gary McFarland Orchestra (1963)	Conversations with Myself (1963)	Plays the Theme from The V.I.P.s and Other Great Songs (1963)

Conversations with Myself is a 1963 album by American jazz pianist Bill Evans recorded for Verve Records, overdubbing three piano tracks for each track.

== Background ==
During studio sessions on February 6 and 9 and May 20, 1963, Evans recorded on Steinway piano CD 318—the "cherished" instrument of classical pianist Glenn Gould, who was "a connoisseur of Evans's work"—using a method of overdubbing three different yet corresponding piano tracks for each song. The project posed significant "technical and musical challenges" for both Evans and his producer, Creed Taylor.

Because the method was considered controversial in jazz circles at the time, Evans included "A Statement" in the liner notes to the original LP (reprinted in the 1997 CD reissue), in which he wrote:

There is a viewpoint which holds that any recorded music which cannot also be produced in natural live performance is a "gimmick" and therefore should not be considered as a pure musical effort. Because the performance and recording procedure used in this recording might stimulate this issue to a question in some minds, I requested the opportunity to state my firm belief in the integrity of the idea upon which this album was conceived and some supporting reasons.

To the person who uses music as a medium for the expression of ideas, feelings, images, or what have you; anything which facilitates this expression is properly his instrument. ... I remember that in recording the selections, as I listened to the first track while playing the second, and the first two while playing the third, the process involved was an artificial duplication of simultaneous performance in that each track represented a musical mind responding to another musical mind or minds.

The argument that the same mind was involved in all three performances could be advanced, but I feel that this is not quite true. The functions of each track are different, and as one in speech feels a different state of mind making statements than in responding to statements or commenting on the exchange involved in the first two; so I feel that the music here has more the quality of a "trio" than a solo effort.

Another condition to be considered is the fact that I know my musical techniques more thoroughly than any other person, so that, it seems to me, I am equipped to respond to my previous musician statements with the most accuracy and clarity.

Evans followed Conversations with Myself with Further Conversations with Myself (1967) and New Conversations (1978), both also recorded with overdubbed piano tracks.

== Antecedents ==
Evans was not the first jazz musician to use overdubbing. In 1941, Sidney Bechet had made an experimental one-man-band recording of the song "The Sheik of Araby." In addition, the technique had been extensively used by guitarist Les Paul, and Rosemary Clooney had overdubbed vocals to prerecorded big-band tracks made by Duke Ellington for the album Blue Rose (1956), among other examples. Most notably, the pianist Lennie Tristano, who was a significant influence on Evans, had made extensive use of overdubbing on a self-titled album recorded in 1955. Evans biographer Peter Pettinger notes that this recording was "technically, although not musically, the precursor" of Evans's ambitious album.

== Repertoire ==
Conversations with Myself features five jazz standards along with three compositions by Thelonious Monk. For one of the Monk pieces, "Blue Monk", Evans uses only two piano tracks instead of the three used for all the other selections. Another of the Monk tunes, "Bemsha Swing", was not included on the original LP but was highly valued by Evans's manager, Helen Keane, and reinstated for the CD releases along with Evans's interpretation of "A Sleepin' Bee" by Harold Arlen.

The first piece recorded for the album was a new Evans original, "N.Y.C.'s No Lark", a "brooding" composition commemorating Evans's friend and fellow jazz pianist Sonny Clark, who had died one month before Evans began work on this album. The title of the piece is an anagram based on Clark's name, and its "B" section alludes to Igor Stravinsky's The Firebird, "which tells a story of death and transfiguration".

The program is rounded out by a complex elaboration of the love theme composed by Alex North for the 1960 Stanley Kubrick film Spartacus, which Evans had seen at a drive-in with his friend the pianist Warren Bernhardt. Bernhardt recalled that during the film, Evans had said, "Oh, wow, listen to that theme, that's a beautiful theme." Evans biographer Keith Shadwick describes this highly acclaimed performance as "utterly inspired .... It goes beyond what is done elsewhere on the album .... Here, the pacing, contrast and drama that occur throughout the exchanges are a constant marvel. Evans takes enormous risks, such as the miraculous tracery of the fast right-hand lines embroidering the final collective improvisation."

== Critical reception ==
Professional ratings
Review scores
Source	Rating
DownBeat	(Original Lp release)
AllMusic	4.5/5 stars
All About Jazz	3.5/5 stars
The Penguin Guide to Jazz Recordings	3.5/4 stars

The album earned Evans his first Grammy Award in 1964 for Best Jazz Instrumental Album, Individual or Group, and had received a 5-star review in DownBeat in 1963.

Writing for AllMusic, music critic Michael G. Nastos said:

Certainly one of the more unusual items in the discography of an artist whose consistency is as evident as any in modern jazz, and nothing should dissuade you from purchasing this one of a kind album that in some ways set a technological standard for popular music—and jazz—to come.

Jason Laipply of All About Jazz wrote:

[The album] was an instant classic for the jazz community. Evans' work on the ten tunes included here is truly inspired and amazing to behold .... [T]his glimpse of the artist at a heightened level of expression is very rewarding indeed. However, for the casual fan, I would not suggest this disc. The musical vocabulary is complex enough that the simple beauty of the songs, and Evans’ playing, is at times lost.

Pettinger, himself a concert pianist, calls the album "a work of staggering resource and beauty, appreciated especially (but not only) by professional pianists." Shadwick observes that Evans accorded "each recorded piano part a rhythmic, harmonic and melodic role in direct parallel to his own trio's work." He also notes that the album was released "to universal critical acclaim" and that he regards it as the pianist's "most revered" recording next to only "the 1961 live-at-the-Vanguard recordings."

== Reissues ==
Verve released the album on CD in 1984 and then brought out a newly remastered digipak "Verve Master Edition" in 1997.

== Track listing ==
Tracks 9 and 10 not part of original LP release. Track 7 recorded on February 6, 1963; tracks 1, 2, 5, 6, 8-10 on February 9; tracks 3 and 4 recorded on May 20, 1963.

No.	Title	Music	Length
1.	"'Round Midnight"	Monk; Williams	6:35
2.	"How About You?"	Lane; Ralph Freed	2:50
3.	"Spartacus Love Theme"	Alex North	5:10
4.	"Blue Monk"	Monk	4:32
5.	"Stella by Starlight"	Young; Washington	4:52
6.	"Hey There"	Richard Adler; Ross	4:31
7.	"N.Y.C.'s No Lark"	Evans	5:36
8.	"Just You, Just Me"	Jesse Greer; Raymond Klages	2:37
Total length:			36:43

Bonus Tracks for CD releases
No.	Title	Music	Length
9.	"Bemsha Swing"	Denzil Best; Monk	2:56
10.	"A Sleepin' Bee"	Arlen; Capote	4:10
Total length:			42:49

== Personnel ==
- Bill Evans - piano (multi-tracked)
- Creed Taylor - producer

== Legacy ==
In addition to Evans's own later albums that used overdubbing, a number of pianists who expressed admiration for Evans have used the technique in their own recordings. The minimalist composer Terry Riley, who wrote highly of Evans on several occasions and placed him in his "Pantheon" of "teachers and heroes," used overdubbing with various types of keyboards for his 1969 album A Rainbow in Curved Air.

Glenn Gould, whose piano, as noted above, was used by Evans for Conversations with Myself, later employed overdubbing himself for some of his transcriptions of the complex music of Richard Wagner, which he recorded in 1973.

In 1994, Fred Hersch used overdubbing for one track on his album I Never Told You: Fred Hersch Plays Johnny Mandel. The Johnny Mandel piece he chose to give this treatment, "Seascape," had first been recorded by Evans in 1977 for his album I Will Say Goodbye. Hersch writes in the liner notes that he was "intimately acquainted with [the] wonderful triple-tracked album, Conversations with Myself" by "legendary pianist Bill Evans."

In addition, on the 1997 tribute album Conversations with Bill Evans, French classical pianist Jean-Yves Thibaudet used overdubbing for recordings of two pieces that Evans had also recorded that way, Evans's own "Song for Helen" (from New Conversations) and "Love Theme from Spartacus" (from the original Conversations with Myself). Thibaudet noted of the latter: "In trying to sync up those fast 32nd note runs, I suddenly began inventing my own lines. It wasn't planned, I just did it on the spur of the moment, playing all kinds of things based on what Bill originally played."
