= I Will Say Goodbye =

Studio album by the Bill Evans Trio
- Released: 1980
- Recorded: May 11–13, 1977
- Studio: Fantasy Studios, Berkeley
- Genre: Jazz
- Length: 46:19
- Label: Fantasy; F 9593
- Producer: Helen Keane

The Bill Evans Trio chronology
Crosscurrents (1977)	I Will Say Goodbye (1980)	You Must Believe in Spring (1977)

I Will Say Goodbye is an album by American jazz pianist Bill Evans, recorded with bassist Eddie Gómez and drummer Eliot Zigmund in 1977 but not released until January 1980. It was his final album for Fantasy Records, making the title quite appropriate.

== Repertoire ==
Most of the material on the album was contemporary and fresh to Evans's repertoire. The two sides of the original LP both open with takes of the title track by Michel Legrand, the second more than a minute longer than the first. Evans had participated in one session of Legrand's classic 1958 album Legrand Jazz, and in the meantime, the Frenchman had become a major film composer and songwriter, whose works, as Evans biographer Peter Pettinger notes "have beguiling melodic appeal, and this, combined with their satisfying construction (Legrand has a strong sense of key relationships within a short span), is what persistently attracted Evans. His tunes also carry much sentiment, and the pianist could turn that to lyrical advantage while avoiding the maudlin."

The album also includes works by "several [other] composers who inevitably inspired the pianist, including ... Johnny Mandel, Earl Zindars, and Steve Swallow." In addition, Evans performs a version of "Dolphin Dance" by his younger contemporary Herbie Hancock, which first appeared on the classic album Maiden Voyage (1965) and had been covered by Ahmad Jamal on his acclaimed album The Awakening (1970). The album includes one Evans original, "The Opener."

The 1992 CD reissue by Original Jazz Classics includes two bonus tracks that round out the material from these recording sessions: an older standard, Jerome Kern's "Nobody Else but Me," and another Legrand composition, "Orson's Theme," an insouciant piece that had been composed for the Orson Welles film F for Fake.

== Reception ==
At the 23rd Annual Grammy Awards in 1981, the year after the pianist's death, I Will Say Goodbye won the Grammy Award for Best Jazz Instrumental Solo and We Will Meet Again won the Grammy Award for Best Jazz Instrumental Album.

The AllMusic review by Scott Yanow called the album "[f]ine post-bop music from an influential piano giant."

Professional ratings
Review scores
Source	Rating
AllMusic	4/5 stars
The Penguin Guide to Jazz Recordings	3/4 stars
The Rolling Stone Jazz Record Guide	4/5 stars

Evans biographer Keith Shadwick says the album is "one of Evans's most consistently inventive and involving latter-day trio albums." He singled out the "elegiac" performance of Zindars's "Quiet Light," which is "played here with delicate blue translucence and perfect control of form," along with the "restrained but exquisite solo piano rendering" of the intro to Burt Bacharach's "A House Is Not a Home" and the "stardust-scattered halt at the end" of the title track. Shadwick also detects some influence on Evans's rhapsodically romantic playing on the album by Erroll Garner, who had died just a few months before these recording sessions and whom Evans highly admired.

== Track listing ==
1. "I Will Say Goodbye" (Legrand) – 3:30
2. "Dolphin Dance" (Herbie Hancock) – 6:04
3. "Seascape" (Johnny Mandel) – 5:23
4. "Peau Douce" (Steve Swallow) – 4:18
5. "Nobody Else but Me" (Hammerstein II, Kern) – 5:06 Bonus track on CD reissue
6. "I Will Say Goodbye" [Take 2] (Legrand) – 4:51
7. "The Opener" (Bill Evans) – 6:13
8. "Quiet Light" (Earl Zindars) – 2:29
9. "A House Is Not a Home" (Bacharach, David) – 4:38
10. "Orson's Theme" (Legrand) – 3:47 Bonus track on CD reissue

== Personnel ==
Credits adapted from AllMusic.

- Bill Evans – piano
- Eddie Gómez – bass
- Eliot Zigmund – drums

Production

- Helen Keane – producer
- Bruce Walford – engineer
- Phil Bray – photography
- Phil Carroll – art direction
- Phil DeLancie – digital remastering (reissue)

== Chart positions ==
Year	Chart	Position
1980	Billboard Jazz Albums	37
