= Further Conversations with Myself =

Studio album by Bill Evans
- Released: December 1967
- Recorded: August 9, 1967
- Venues: Webster Hall, New York City
- Genre: Jazz
- Length: 35:03
- Labels: Verve; V6-8727
- Producer: Helen Keane

Bill Evans chronology
A Simple Matter of Conviction (1966)	Further Conversations with Myself (1967)	California Here I Come (1967)

Further Conversations with Myself is a 1967 album by jazz pianist Bill Evans. All the pieces are solo with piano overdubs, a method Evans used on his earlier release Conversations with Myself. This time, however, he employed only two piano tracks instead of three. The album was nominated for a Grammy. It was reissued on CD by Verve in 1999.

== Reception ==
Professional ratings
Review scores
Source	Rating
AllMusic	3/5 stars
The Penguin Guide to Jazz Recordings	3.5/4 stars

Writing for AllMusic, music critic Scott Yanow called the album "A thoughtful and (despite the overdubbing) spontaneous sounding set of melodic music." Peter Pettinger notes that it "opens with the arresting beauty of that new title in the Evans book, Johnny Mandel's 'Emily,' a fresh bloom that was to become a great favorite. The same composer's Academy Award-winning 'The Shadow of Your Smile,' from the 1965 film The Sandpiper, received a probing performance, one of the most concentrated of Evans's career, developing with increasing insistence and relentless pace .... By contrast, a stark emotional directness was brought to Denny Zeitlin's fine tune 'Quiet Now,' another Evans mainstay-in-the-making."

== Track listing ==
1. "Emily" (Johnny Mandel, Johnny Mercer) - 4:56
2. "Yesterdays" (Otto Harbach, Jerome Kern) - 3:50
3. "Santa Claus Is Coming to Town" (J. Fred Coots, Haven Gillespie) - 3:47
4. "Funny Man" (Bill Evans) - 3:45
5. "The Shadow of Your Smile (Love Theme from "The Sandpiper")" (Mandel, Paul Francis Webster) - 8:03
6. "Little Lulu" (Buddy Kaye, Sidney Lippman, Fred Wise) - 2:50
7. "Quiet Now" (Denny Zeitlin) - 7:53

== Credits ==
- Bill Evans - overdubbed pianos
- Ray Hall - engineer
