= Bill Evans Trio with Symphony Orchestra =

Studio album by The Bill Evans Trio
- Released: 1966
- Recorded: October and December 1965
- Studios: Van Gelder Studio, Englewood Cliffs, New Jersey
- Genre: Jazz
- Length: 37:28
- Label: Verve
- Producer: Creed Taylor

The Bill Evans Trio chronology
| Trio '65 (1965) | Bill Evans Trio with Symphony Orchestra (1966) | Bill Evans at Town Hall (1966) |

Bill Evans Trio with Symphony Orchestra is an album by American jazz pianist Bill Evans and his trio, released in 1966, featuring jazz arrangements of works by classical composers Granados, J.S. Bach, Scriabin, Fauré, and Chopin. The trio is accompanied by an orchestra consisting of strings and woodwinds arranged and conducted by Claus Ogerman. Originals by both Evans and Ogerman are also included.

The opening track, "Granadas," is based on the "maiden" theme of Granados's "The Maiden and the Nightingale" from his piano suite Goyescas but does not employ the "nightingale" theme. The two Evans originals, "Time Remembered" and "My Bells," had previously been recorded by a quintet led by Evans, featuring saxophonist Zoot Sims and guitarist Jim Hall; but since the pianist did not approve the release of that album, which appeared only posthumously, this was the first time recordings of these pieces reached the public. The Ogerman piece, "Elegia," is adapted from his Concerto for Orchestra and Jazz Piano.

Evans stated, "I really enjoyed making this album with Claus and record my deepest respect and admiration for him." The pianist would go on to make another orchestral album with Ogerman, Symbiosis, in 1974.

In 1967, Hellas Music Corp published a set of transcriptions of the arrangements for the Bill Evans Trio with Symphony Orchestra LP. The recording was issued on compact disc by Verve Records in 1984.

== Reception ==
Professional ratings
Review scores
| Source | Rating |
|---|---|
| DownBeat (Original Lp release) | 3.5/5 stars |
| AllMusic | 2/5 stars |
| All About Jazz | (favorable) |
| The Penguin Guide to Jazz Recordings | 3/4 stars |

The album divided critical opinion. Scott Yanow stated in his AllMusic review: "This collaboration ... is predictably dull ... one of Bill Evans' least significant recordings, a weak third stream effort."

In contrast, Roger Crane states in his All About Jazz review, "Although dismissed by some critics, this CD, with arrangements by Claus Ogermann [sic], is very lovely. Evans was very proud of this album. Ogermann's charts are sweetly romantic rather than overbearing, and this gives Evans and his trio (with bassist Chuck Israels and drummer Grady Tate) room to maneuver. Evans' composition 'My Bells' is one of the stronger cuts."

Evans biographer Keith Shadwick wrote that the album "has often been written off as something of a commercial aberration in the pianist's career, but this writer finds no reason to do so. It is a sincere if somewhat conservative attempt to marry together jazz and classical using material susceptible to that kind of arrangement. It is also often rather beautiful, always tasteful, and enjoyably relaxing." He singled out the performances of the Granados, Fauré, and Ogerman pieces for special praise.

The composer Johnny Mandel liked the album a lot, and Tony Bennett "declared it one of his all-time favorite albums."

== Track listing ==
1. "Granadas" (after the opening theme of The Maiden and the Nightingale by Enrique Granados) – 5:54
2. "Valse" (after the 2nd movement Siciliano of the flute sonata BWV 1031 by Johann Sebastian Bach) – 5:52
3. "Prelude" (after Prelude Op. 11, no. 15 in D-flat by Alexander Scriabin) – 3:01
4. "Time Remembered" (Bill Evans) – 4:10
5. "Pavane" (Gabriel Fauré) – 4:01
6. "Elegia (Elegy)" (Claus Ogerman) – 5:12
7. "My Bells" (Evans) – 3:48
8. "Blue Interlude" (based on Prelude Op. 28, no. 20 in C minor by Frédéric Chopin) – 6:04

== Personnel ==
- Bill Evans – piano
- Chuck Israels – bass
- Grady Tate – drums (The CD booklet says, "Larry Bunker or Grady Tate, drums." However, Israels confirmed that it was Tate who appeared on these sessions and praised his contribution, and Tate is listed as the drummer in Pettinger's discography and in the online "Bill Evans Discography.")
- Larry Bunker – drums (doubtful)
- Unidentified strings and woodwinds arranged and conducted by Claus Ogerman

== Production ==
- Creed Taylor – producer
- Rudy Van Gelder – recording engineer
