= You Must Believe in Spring (Bill Evans album) =

Studio album by Bill Evans
- Released: February 2, 1981
- Recorded: August 23–25, 1977
- Studio: Capitol Studios, Los Angeles
- Genre: Jazz
- Length: 33:48
- Label: Warner Bros. HS-3504
- Producer: Helen Keane, Tommy LiPuma

Bill Evans chronology
I Will Say Goodbye (1977)	You Must Believe in Spring (1981)	New Conversations (1978)

Professional ratings
Review scores
Source	Rating
All About Jazz	(favorable)
AllMusic	4/5 stars
The Penguin Guide to Jazz Recordings	3/4 stars
The Rolling Stone Jazz Record Guide	3/5 stars

You Must Believe in Spring is an album by American jazz pianist Bill Evans, recorded with bassist Eddie Gómez and drummer Eliot Zigmund in August 1977 and released in February 1981, shortly after Evans' death in September 1980.

Unlike most posthumous releases of the pianist's recordings, this material had been authorized by Evans for release. It has been described as "one of Bill Evans' most beloved recordings and features possibly the best-sounding audio of any album he ever did."

== Background ==
The album represented both beginnings and endings. It was Evans' first album for his new label, Warner Brothers, but it was also the last one with his longtime bassist Gómez, who left to pursue other musical projects. Gómez "was beginning to feel pigeonholed as the bass player to Bill Evans, and the pianist himself felt that he was providing a limited setting for Eddie's talents."

Speaking with Marian McPartland the following year, Evans reflected that Gómez and he "had 11 wonderful years together" and singled out this (as-yet-unreleased) album as containing "a couple of solos" by the bassist "that are to me just absolutely classic, beautiful solos." Zigmund remained with Evans for one more album, Affinity (which was released before this one although recorded after it).

The cover of the album features the painting "Yearning" by American artist Charles Burchfield.

== Repertoire ==
Keith Shadwick notes that "in many ways" this album "complements the last Fantasy session [I Will Say Goodbye]. It has the same musicians, the same approach and the same balance of [contemporary] repertoire, along with a similar feeling of elegy and restrained ease." As with its predecessor, it took its title from a song by Michel Legrand, which Evans had also recorded the previous year in duet with Tony Bennett on their second collaboration, Together Again.

Peter Pettinger notes that "Legrand's way with a melody was sinking deep into the pianist's psyche" and that his own final compositions reflected this influence in various ways. Evans' recordings of "You Must Believe in Spring" were among the earliest, particularly under its English-language title, and it has gone on to become a major jazz standard, recorded more than 350 times.

Another standard-in-the-making, "The Peacocks" by jazz pianist Jimmy Rowles, was included here. Evans had previously recorded it live with Stan Getz in 1974, but that version wasn't released until 1996, making this one the first Evans cover to reach the public. Rowles was "thrilled" that such an esteemed colleague had championed his piece: "When a guy like that takes your song, it makes you feel good."

The album also features the Johnny Mandel song "Suicide Is Painless," also known as the theme from the TV show M*A*S*H. Evans had enlisted in the Korean War himself, playing in military bands, and was a devoted fan of the series, sometimes watching it between sets. Evans' contemporary Ahmad Jamal had already recorded the theme for the soundtrack album of the original film. Mandel's famous song remained in Evans' repertoire to the end, performed as a kind of anthem during his final years. After giving its title in live performances, Evans, who was committing a kind of slow-motion suicide himself, would wryly comment, "Debatable." A number of later live Evans recordings of the theme are in circulation, including no fewer than three on Consecration: The Final Recordings Part 2, recorded just days before Evans' death.

Reflecting on this choice of repertoire, Francis Davis commented, "I think what drew Evans to Burt Bacharach, Johnny Mandel, and Michel Legrand was that they were among the few composers of their era still writing more or less in the style of Gershwin and Porter. Evans wanted to be the first to explore the provocative chord changes hidden just beneath their sumptuous melodies."

The album's two originals by Evans, "B Minor Waltz" and "We Will Meet Again," are dedicated, respectively, to his common-law wife, Ellaine Schultz, and his brother, Harry, both of whom had taken their own lives. Both pieces are waltzes, as are the two remaining selections, "Gary's Theme" by the late Gary McFarland, with whom Evans had recorded an album in 1963, and "Sometime Ago" by Sergio Mihanovich. Shadwick characterizes "B Minor Waltz," the album's opener, as "a contemplative ballad waltz full of muted regret and tenderness."

Pettinger notes that it had been several years "since Evans had experienced a fertile period of composing, but the trickle begun by 'The Opener'" from his previous album and these two new tunes "presaged a flood that would sustain his imagination to the end."

== Reception ==
AllMusic critic Scott Yanow pithily noted, "This well-rounded set ... features the highly influential pianist Bill Evans in a set of typically sensitive trio performances. ... It's a solid example of the great pianist's artistry."

Shadwick comments, "Beautifully recorded ... the LP documents a trio completely at ease with each other and allowing the music to flow in the most natural but refined way. ... [Gómez] lavishes some of his most composed and insightful playing upon the listener while Zigmund stokes the fires at every opportunity." Citing "Suicide Is Painless" and the elegies for Ellaine and Harry in opposition to the "life-affirming" theme of the title track, he adds, "That takes us back to what seems the album's central theme of death and rebirth."

Reviewer Andrew Cartmel calls it "an album of startling beauty with exemplary, elegant playing in the purity of a trio setting and it displays a flawless choice of material." It also serves, he says, as "a poignant reminder, should any be needed, of the immensity of our loss when Bill Evans checked out."

== Reissue ==
Rhino reissued the album on compact disc in 2003 with three bonus tracks from the same August 1977 sessions added, including a take on the only song from Kind of Blue that Evans did not play on, "Freddie Freeloader." CD reissue producer Richard Siedel indicates that Evans plays electric piano on "Without a Song"; if so, it is not audible on the track. However, within the list of personnel on the CD reissue version, Evans is credited with acoustic and electric piano only on "Freddie Freeloader." The rendition begins on acoustic piano and switches at 3:43 to a Fender Rhodes electric piano for most of the duration of the piece. After Zigmund's spirited drum solo at 6:52, Evans resumes playing acoustic piano through the finale.

== Track listing ==
Side one
No.	Title	Writer(s)	Length
1.	"B Minor Waltz (for Ellaine)"	Bill Evans	3:12
2.	"You Must Believe in Spring"	Alan Bergman, Marilyn Bergman, Jacques Demy, Michel Legrand	5:37
3.	"Gary's Theme"	Gary McFarland	4:15
4.	"We Will Meet Again (for Harry)"	Bill Evans	3:59

Side two
No.	Title	Writer(s)	Length
1.	"The Peacocks"	Jimmy Rowles	6:00
2.	"Sometime Ago"	Sergio Mihanovich	4:52
3.	"Theme from M*A*S*H (Suicide Is Painless)"	Johnny Mandel, Mike Altman	5:53

2003 reissue bonus tracks
No.	Title	Writer(s)	Length
8.	"Without a Song"	Edward Eliscu, Billy Rose, Vincent Youmans	8:05
9.	"Freddie Freeloader"	Miles Davis	7:34
10.	"All of You"	Cole Porter	8:09

== Personnel ==
- Bill Evans – piano; electric piano on "Freddie Freeloader"
- Eddie Gómez – bass
- Eliot Zigmund – drums
