= How My Heart Sings! =

Studio album by The Bill Evans Trio
- Released: January 1964
- Recorded: May 17, 1962 (tracks 1, 6); May 29, 1962 (5, 7, 9); June 5, 1962 (2–4, 8)
- Studio: Sound Makers Studio, New York City
- Genre: Jazz
- Length: 48:43
- Label: Riverside; RLP-473
- Producer: Orrin Keepnews

The Bill Evans Trio chronology
Moon Beams (1962)	How My Heart Sings! (1964)	Interplay (1962)

How My Heart Sings! is an album recorded by jazz pianist Bill Evans with bassist Chuck Israels and drummer Paul Motian in 1962 during the same sessions as the previously released album Moon Beams. As Evans explains in the album's liner notes, the first release "was comprised of material selected for its mood quality and which was entirely of a ballad nature .... Conversely, the selections represented here are primarily of a more 'moving' kind, though there is in the trio's approach to all material a desire to present a singing sound."

== Repertoire ==
The title track is another waltz composed by Evans' friend Earl Zindars, whose "Elsa" the pianist had previously recorded on both Explorations and Cannonball Adderley's Know What I Mean? The new composition was unusual for jazz at this time because it shifts meters for a 4/4 interlude. Since Evans' death, this innovative piece has gone on to become a jazz standard, covered at least 75 times, notably by pianist Bill Cunliffe on his all-Zindars album of 2003.

How My Heart Sings! also includes an early cover of "In Your Own Sweet Way" (1956) by Evans' older colleague Dave Brubeck, which has now been covered more than 350 times. Three lesser-known Evans originals also first appeared here: "Walking Up," "34 Skidoo," and "Show-Type Tune." The program is rounded out with three standards, which producer Orrin Keepnews notes "illustrate once again Bill's impeccable taste in selecting such numbers, as well as his uncanny ability to make the supposedly over-familiar, like Summertime, sound completely fresh."

== Releases ==
How My Heart Sings! and Moon Beams were also released combined on LP in 1977 as the double album The Second Trio, with the tracks sequenced in the order recorded rather than as released. How My Heart Sings! was remastered and reissued on CD in 1989 with one bonus track, an alternate take of Brubeck's "In Your Own Sweet Way."

== Reception ==
Professional ratings
Review scores
Source	Rating
AllMusic	4/5 stars
The Penguin Guide to Jazz Recordings	4/4 stars

Writing for AllMusic, music critic Thom Jurek wrote of the album, "This is a tough recording; it flies in the face of the conventions Evans himself has set, and yet retrains [sic] the deep, nearly profound lyricism that was the pianist's trademark." On All About Jazz, C. Michael Bailey said, "After the ballad-laden Moon Beams, producer Orrin Keepnews wanted a slightly more up-tempo recording that resulted in How My Heart Sings. Fifty years later, the recording remains painfully introspective, up-tempo or not. Evans was the Van Gogh of jazz: sensile and troubled, characteristics that expressed themselves in his playing his entire career."

== Track listing ==
1. "How My Heart Sings" (Earl Zindars) – 4:59
2. "I Should Care" (Sammy Cahn, Axel Stordahl, Paul Weston) – 4:55
3. "In Your Own Sweet Way" (Dave Brubeck) – 6:59
4. "In Your Own Sweet Way" [alternate take - bonus track] – 5:54
5. "Walking Up" (Bill Evans) – 4:57
6. "Summertime" (George Gershwin, Ira Gershwin, DuBose Heyward) – 6:00
7. "34 Skidoo" (Evans) – 6:22
8. "Ev'rything I Love" (Cole Porter) – 4:13
9. "Show-Type Tune" (Evans) – 4:22

== Personnel ==
- Bill Evans - Piano
- Chuck Israels - Bass
- Paul Motian - Drums
