= Moon Beams =

1962 studio album by the Bill Evans Trio

- The album cover features Nico, then a fashion model and actress.

Studio album by the Bill Evans Trio
- Released: December 1962
- Recorded: May 17 – June 2, 1962
- Studio: Sound Makers, New York City
- Genre: Jazz
- Length: 39:00
- Label: Riverside
- Producer: Orrin Keepnews

The Bill Evans Trio chronology
Undercurrent (1962)	Moon Beams (1962)	How My Heart Sings! (1962)

Moon Beams is a 1962 album by the jazz musician Bill Evans and the first trio album he recorded after the death of bassist Scott LaFaro. It introduces two important Evans originals, "Re: Person I Knew" (an anagram of the name of his then-producer, Orrin Keepnews), and "Very Early", which Evans had actually composed as an undergraduate. The originals serve as bookends to an album otherwise consisting of standards from the 1930s and 1940s.

== Music and releases ==
With Chuck Israels on bass taking the place of LaFaro, Evans recorded a number of songs during sessions in May and June 1962. As planned by Keepnews, Moon Beams contains a collection of ballads recorded during this period, whereas the more up-tempo tunes were put on the album How My Heart Sings!, which was not released until 1964. In 2012, Riverside released a newly remastered edition, which includes three previously unreleased alternative takes. Moon Beams and How My Heart Sings! were also released combined as the double album The Second Trio. The woman on the album cover is Nico, who would later achieve recognition as a musical artist herself.

== Reception ==
Professional ratings
Review scores
Source	Rating
DownBeat (Original Lp release)	3.5/5 stars
Allmusic	4/5 stars
The Rolling Stone Jazz Record Guide	3/5 stars
The Penguin Guide to Jazz Recordings	3.5/4 stars

Writing for AllMusic, music critic Thom Jurek said that the "selections are so well paced and sequenced the record feels like a dream. ... Moonbeams was a startling return to the recording sphere and a major advancement in [Evans's] development as a leader."

Peter Pettinger writes that the album "contained some of the group's most introspective playing, including half a dozen standards epitomizing the Bill Evans ballad conception, each one the equivalent of a classical masterpiece."

Keith Shadwick notes that Israels' "bass style and sound [are] completely different from ... LaFaro's, more traditional in every aspect. The melodic, rhythmic, and harmonic choices he makes for solos and accompaniment are similar to those heard from many other top bass players at the time, from Oscar Pettiford to Paul Chambers. ... The working practice established on Moonbeams would remain in place while Israels was with the group, giving it a very tight, disciplined character and style. The inessentials were all but eliminated, the spotlight trained firmly on the pianist."

== Track listing ==
Side one

1. "Re: Person I Knew" (Bill Evans) – 5:44
2. "Polka Dots and Moonbeams" (Johnny Burke, Jimmy Van Heusen) – 5:01
3. "I Fall in Love Too Easily" (Sammy Cahn, Jule Styne) – 2:42
4. "Stairway to the Stars" (Matty Malneck, Frank Signorelli, Mitchell Parish) – 4:53

Side two

1. "If You Could See Me Now" (Tadd Dameron, Carl Sigman) – 4:29
2. "It Might as Well Be Spring" (Richard Rodgers, Oscar Hammerstein II) – 6:05
3. "In Love in Vain" (Leo Robin, Jerome Kern) – 5:00
4. "Very Early" (Bill Evans) – 5:06

Bonus tracks on 2012 CD reissue:

9. "Polka Dots and Moonbeams" [Alternate Take] - 4:17
10. "I Fall in Love Too Easily" [Alternate Take] - 2:38
11. "Very Early" [Alternate Take] - 3:35

== Personnel ==
- Bill Evans - piano
- Chuck Israels - bass
- Paul Motian - drums

== Production ==
- Orrin Keepnews - producer
- Pete Sahula - photographer
- Nico - photographic model
- Ken Deardoff - album design
