= Bill Evans =

American jazz pianist (1929–1980)

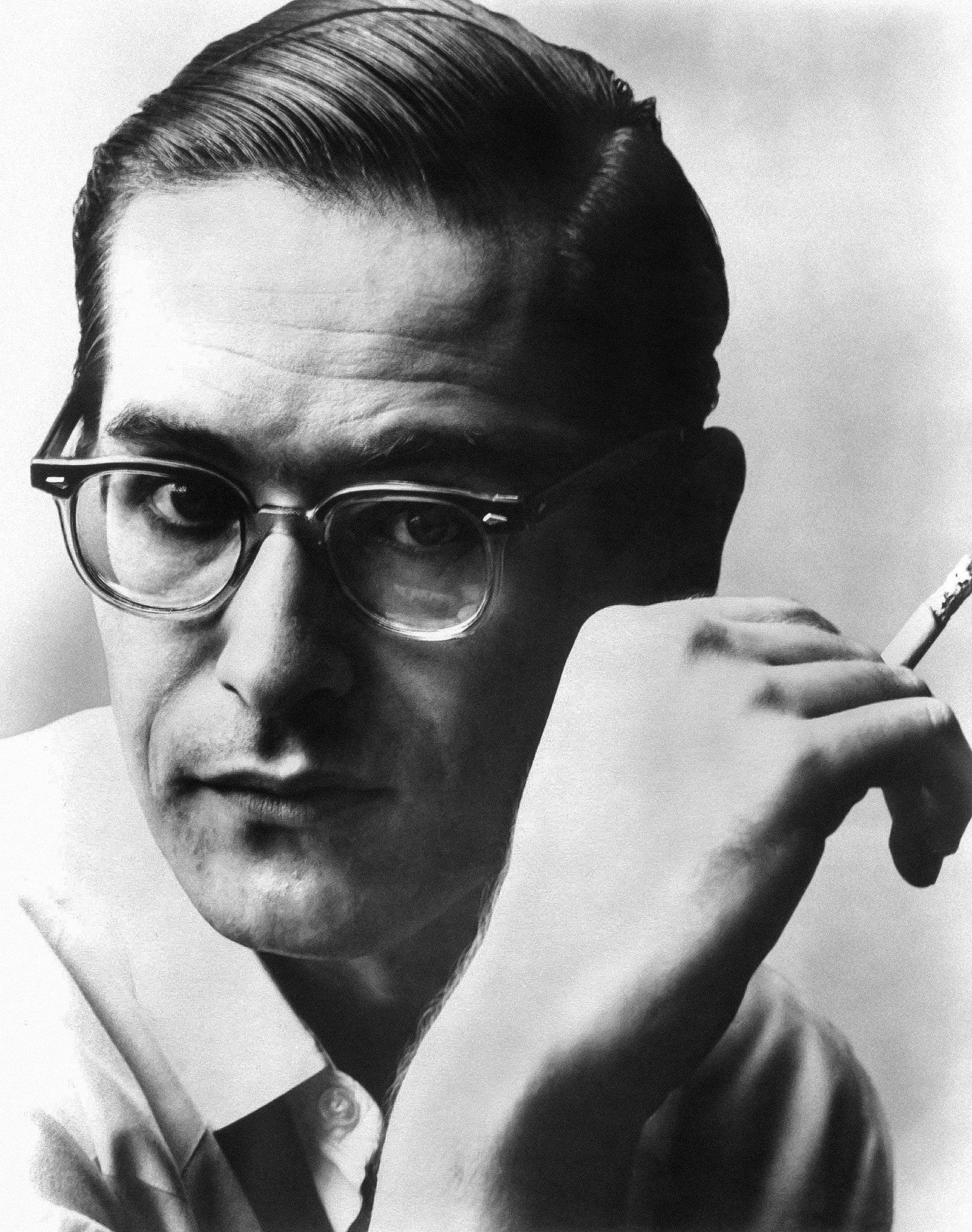
- Evans in 1961

Background information
- Born: William John Evans; August 16, 1929; Plainfield, New Jersey, U.S.
- Died: September 15, 1980 (aged 51) New York City, U.S.
- Genres: Jazz; modal jazz; third stream; cool jazz; smooth jazz; post-bop
- Occupations: Musician; composer; arranger; conductor
- Instrument: Piano
- Works: Discography; compositions
- Years active: 1950s–1980
- Labels: Riverside; Verve; Fantasy
- Formerly of: George Russell; Miles Davis; Cannonball Adderley; Philly Joe Jones, Scott LaFaro; Paul Motian; Eddie Gómez; Marty Morell; Tony Bennett; Jim Hall; Stan Getz; Monica Zetterlund; Chet Baker

William John Evans (August 16, 1929 – September 15, 1980) was an American jazz pianist and composer who worked primarily as the leader of his trio. His extensive use of impressionist harmony, block chords, innovative chord voicings, and trademark rhythmically independent "singing" melodic lines continue to influence jazz pianists today.

Born in Plainfield, New Jersey, Evans studied classical music at Southeastern Louisiana College and the Mannes School of Music, in New York City, where he majored in composition and received an artist diploma. In 1955, he moved to New York City, where he worked with bandleader and theorist George Russell. In 1958, Evans joined Miles Davis's sextet, which in 1959, then immersed in modal jazz, recorded Kind of Blue, the best-selling jazz album of all time.

In late 1959, Evans left Davis's band and began his career as a leader, forming a trio with bassist Scott LaFaro and drummer Paul Motian, a group now regarded as a seminal modern jazz trio. They recorded two studio albums, Portrait in Jazz and Explorations, and two albums recorded during a 1961 engagement at New York's Village Vanguard jazz club: Sunday at the Village Vanguard and Waltz for Debby. A complete set (on three CDs) of their Vanguard recordings was issued decades later. Ten days after this booking ended, LaFaro died in a car crash. After months without public performances, Evans reemerged with a new trio featuring Chuck Israels on bass. In 1963, Evans recorded the Grammy Award–winning Conversations with Myself, a solo album produced with overdubbing technology. In 1966, he met bassist Eddie Gómez, with whom he worked for the next 11 years. In the mid-1970s, Evans collaborated with the singer Tony Bennett on two critically acclaimed albums: The Tony Bennett/Bill Evans Album (1975) and Together Again (1977).

Many of Evans's compositions, such as "Waltz for Debby" and "Time Remembered", have become standards, played and recorded by many artists. Evans received 31 Grammy nominations and seven awards, and was inducted into the DownBeat Jazz Hall of Fame.

== Biography ==
=== Early life ===
Evans grew up in North Plainfield, New Jersey, the son of Harry and Mary Evans (née Soroka). His father was of Welsh descent and ran a golf course; his mother was of Rusyn ancestry and descended from a family of coal miners. The marriage was stormy because of his father's heavy drinking, gambling, and abuse. Bill had a brother, Harry (Harold), two years his senior, to whom he was very close.

Due to Harry Evans Sr.'s destructive behavior, Mary Evans frequently left home with her sons to stay with her sister Justine and the Epps family in nearby Somerville. During this time, Harry began taking piano lessons with a local teacher named Helen Leland between the ages of five and seven. Although Bill was considered too young for lessons at first, he picked up playing by mimicking what he heard during Harry's lessons. Eventually, at the age of six, Bill began formal piano lessons alongside Harry.

Evans remembered Leland with affection for not insisting on a heavy technical approach, with scales and arpeggios. He quickly developed a fluent sight-reading ability, but Leland considered Harry a better pianist. Encouraged by his parents to learn multiple instruments, Bill started violin lessons at the age of seven, and soon added flute and piccolo to his studies. He soon dropped those instruments, but it is believed they influenced his keyboard style. He later named Mozart, Beethoven, and Schubert as composers whose work he often played. During high school, Evans came in contact with 20th-century music like Stravinsky's Petrushka, which he called a "tremendous experience", and Milhaud's Suite provençale, whose bitonal language he said "opened him to new things". Around the same time came his first exposure to jazz; at age 12, he heard Tommy Dorsey's and Harry James's bands on the radio. At 13, Bill stood in for a sick pianist in Buddy Valentino's rehearsal band, where Harry was already playing the trumpet. Soon he began to perform for dances and weddings throughout New Jersey, playing music like boogie-woogie and polkas for $1 per hour. Around this time, he met multi-instrumentalist Don Elliott, with whom he later recorded. Another important influence was bassist George Platt, who introduced Evans to the theory of harmony.

Evans also listened to Earl Hines, Art Tatum, Coleman Hawkins, Bud Powell, George Shearing, Stan Getz, and Nat King Cole. He particularly admired Cole. Evans attended North Plainfield High School, graduating in 1946.

One night I got really adventurous on "Tuxedo Junction" and I put in a little "ping!" you know, that wasn't written, and this was such an experience! To make music that wasn't indicated. That really got me into starting to want to think about how to make the music.

— Interview with Harry Evans. c. 1965.

=== College, army, sabbatical year ===
I have always admired your teaching as that rare and amazing combination – exceptional knowledge combined with the ability to bring that same knowledge, that lies deep within the student, to life. You were certainly my biggest inspiration in college, and the seeds of the insights that you have sown, have in practice borne fruit many times over.

— Bill Evans speaking to Gretchen Magee

After high school, in September 1946, Evans attended Southeastern Louisiana College on a flute scholarship. He studied classical piano interpretation with Louis P. Kohnop, John Venettozzi, and Ronald Stetzel. A key figure in Evans's development was Gretchen Magee, whose methods of teaching left a big imprint on his compositional style.

Around his third year in college, Evans composed his first known tune, "Very Early". Also around that time he composed a piece called "Peace Piece". Years later, when asked to play it, he said it was a spontaneous improvisation and didn't know it. He was a founding member of SLU's Delta Omega chapter of Phi Mu Alpha Sinfonia, played quarterback for the fraternity's football team, and played in the college band. In 1950, he performed a movement of Beethoven's Piano Concerto No. 3 on his senior recital, graduating with a Bachelor of Music in piano and a bachelor's in music education. Evans regarded his last three years in college as the happiest of his life.

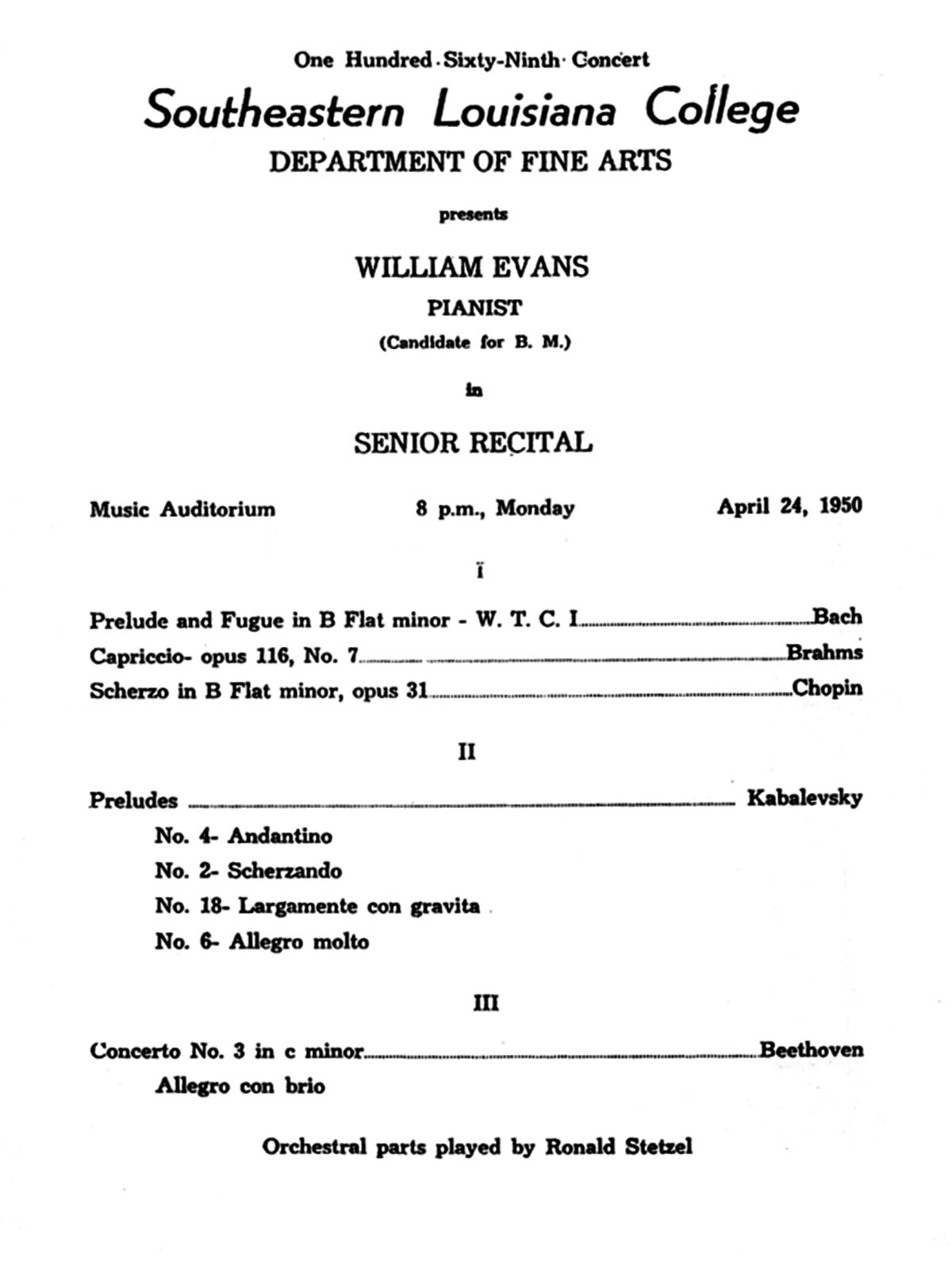
Program of Evans's graduation concert. April 24, 1950.

During college, Evans met guitarist Mundell Lowe, and after graduating, they formed a trio with bassist Red Mitchell. The three moved to New York City but could not attract bookings, prompting them to leave for Calumet City, Illinois. In July 1950, Evans joined Herbie Fields's band, based in Chicago. During the summer, the band did a three-month tour backing Billie Holiday, including East Coast appearances at Harlem's Apollo Theater and shows in Philadelphia, Baltimore, and Washington, D.C. The band included trumpeter Jimmy Nottingham, trombonist Frank Rosolino and bassist Jim Aton. Upon its return to Chicago, Evans and Aton worked as a duo in clubs, often backing singer Lurlean Hunter. Shortly thereafter, Evans received his draft notice and entered the U.S. Army.

During his three-year (1951–54) period in the Army, Evans played flute, piccolo, and piano in the Fifth U.S. Army Band at Fort Sheridan. He hosted a jazz program on the camp radio station and occasionally performed in Chicago clubs, where he met singer Lucy Reed, with whom he became friends and later recorded. He met singer and bassist Bill Scott and Chicago jazz pianist Sam Distefano (his bunkmate in their platoon), both of whom became Evans's close friends. But Evans's stay in the Army was traumatic, and it caused him to have nightmares for years. As people criticized his musical conceptions and playing, he lost confidence for the first time. Around 1953, Evans composed his best-known tune, "Waltz for Debby", for his young niece. During this period, he began using recreational drugs, occasionally smoking marijuana.

Evans was discharged from the Army in January 1954, and entered a period of seclusion triggered by the harsh criticism he had received. He took a sabbatical year and lived with his parents, setting up a studio, acquiring a grand piano, and working on his technique, believing he lacked other musicians' natural fluency. He visited his brother, now in Baton Rouge, Louisiana, recently married and working as a conservatory teacher.

=== Return to New York City ===
In July 1955, Evans returned to New York City and enrolled in the Mannes College of Music for a three-semester postgraduate course in music composition. He also wrote classical settings of poems by William Blake. Along with his studies, Evans played in low-profile "Tuxedo gigs" at the Friendship Club and the Roseland Ballroom, as well as Jewish weddings, intermission spots, and over 40 dances. Better opportunities also arose, such as playing solo opposite the Modern Jazz Quartet at the Village Vanguard, where one day he saw Miles Davis listening to him. During this period, Evans also met Thelonious Monk.

Evans soon began to perform in Greenwich Village clubs with Don Elliott, Tony Scott, Mundell Lowe, and bandleader Jerry Wald. He may have played on some of Wald's discs, but his first proven Wald recording is Listen to the Music of Jerry Wald, which also featured his future drummer Paul Motian.

In early 1955, singer Lucy Reed moved to New York City to play at the Vanguard and The Blue Angel, and in August she recorded The Singing Reed with a four-piece group that included Evans. During this period, he met two of Reed's friends: manager Helen Keane, who became his agent seven years later, and George Russell, with whom he soon worked. That year, he recorded with guitarist Dick Garcia on A Message from Garcia on the Dawn label. In parallel, Evans kept up his work with Scott, playing in Preview's Modern Jazz Club in Chicago in December 1956 – January 1957, and recording The Complete Tony Scott. After the Complete sessions, Scott took a long overseas tour.

=== Debut album New Jazz Conceptions ===
In September 1956, producer Orrin Keepnews was convinced to record the reluctant Evans by a demo tape Mundell Lowe played to him over the phone. The result was his debut album, New Jazz Conceptions, featuring the original versions of "Waltz for Debby" and "Five". Eleven songs were recorded in the first session, including Evans's original composition "Waltz for Debby", which proved to be his most recognized and recorded composition. The album began Evans's relationship with Riverside Records, and also marked the formation of the first Bill Evans trio, with Teddy Kotick (bass) and Paul Motian (drums). AllMusic critic Scott Yanow said about the album: "Bill Evans' debut as a leader found the 27-year-old pianist already sounding much different than the usual Bud Powell-influenced keyboardists of the time ... A strong start to a rather significant career." David Rickert of All About Jazz noted Bud Powell's influence and wrote, "Even at this stage he had the chops to make this a good piano jazz album, but in the end it's not a very good Bill Evans album ... There are glimpses of the later trademarks of Evans' style". Though a critical success that got good reviews in DownBeat and Metronome magazines, New Jazz Conceptions was initially a financial failure, selling only 800 copies the first year. "Five" was for some time Evans's trio farewell tune during performances. After the album's release, Evans spent much time studying J. S. Bach's music to improve his technique.

=== Work with George Russell ===
It was one of those magic moments in your life when you expect a horror story, and the doors of heaven open up. I knew there and then he wasn't going to get away.

— George Russell upon hearing Bill Evans for the first time.

Evans met composer George Russell during his tenure with Lucy Reed. Russell's first impression of Evans was unfavorable ("this is going to be like pulling teeth all day"), but when he secretly heard Evans play, he changed his mind. Russell was then developing his magnum opus, the treatise Lydian Chromatic Concept of Tonal Organization, in which he argued that the Lydian mode was more compatible with tonality than the major scale (Ionian mode) used in most music. This was groundbreaking in jazz, and soon influenced musicians like Miles Davis. Evans, who was already acquainted with these ideas, began to work with Russell in 1956.

By this time, RCA Victor had begun a series of recordings called Jazz Workshop, and soon Russell, through the intervention of Hal McKusick and Jack Lewis, gained his own record date, titled The Jazz Workshop and released in 1957. At that time, Russell assembled trumpeter Art Farmer, guitarist Barry Galbraith, bassist Milt Hinton, and Evans for three recording dates, along with several rehearsal sessions. Initially, for these sessions, only the bassist was given a written part, while the rest were left, and, according to Farmer, "took the parts at home and tried to come to terms with them". The album took a year to make, and was successful enough to enable Russell to escape his penurious lifestyle. Evans performed a significant solo in "Concerto for Billy the Kid".

In 1957, Russell was one of six composers (three jazz, three classical) Brandeis University commissioned to write a piece for its Festival of the Creative Arts in the context of the first experiments in third stream jazz. Russell wrote a suite for orchestra, "All About Rosie", that featured Evans, among other soloists. "All About Rosie" has been cited as one of the few convincing examples of composed polyphony in jazz. A week before the festival, the piece was previewed on TV, and Evans's performance was deemed "legendary" in jazz circles. During the festival performance on June 6, Evans became acquainted with Chuck Israels, who became his bassist years later. Also during the festival, guitarist Joe Puma invited Evans to play on the album Joe Puma/Jazz.

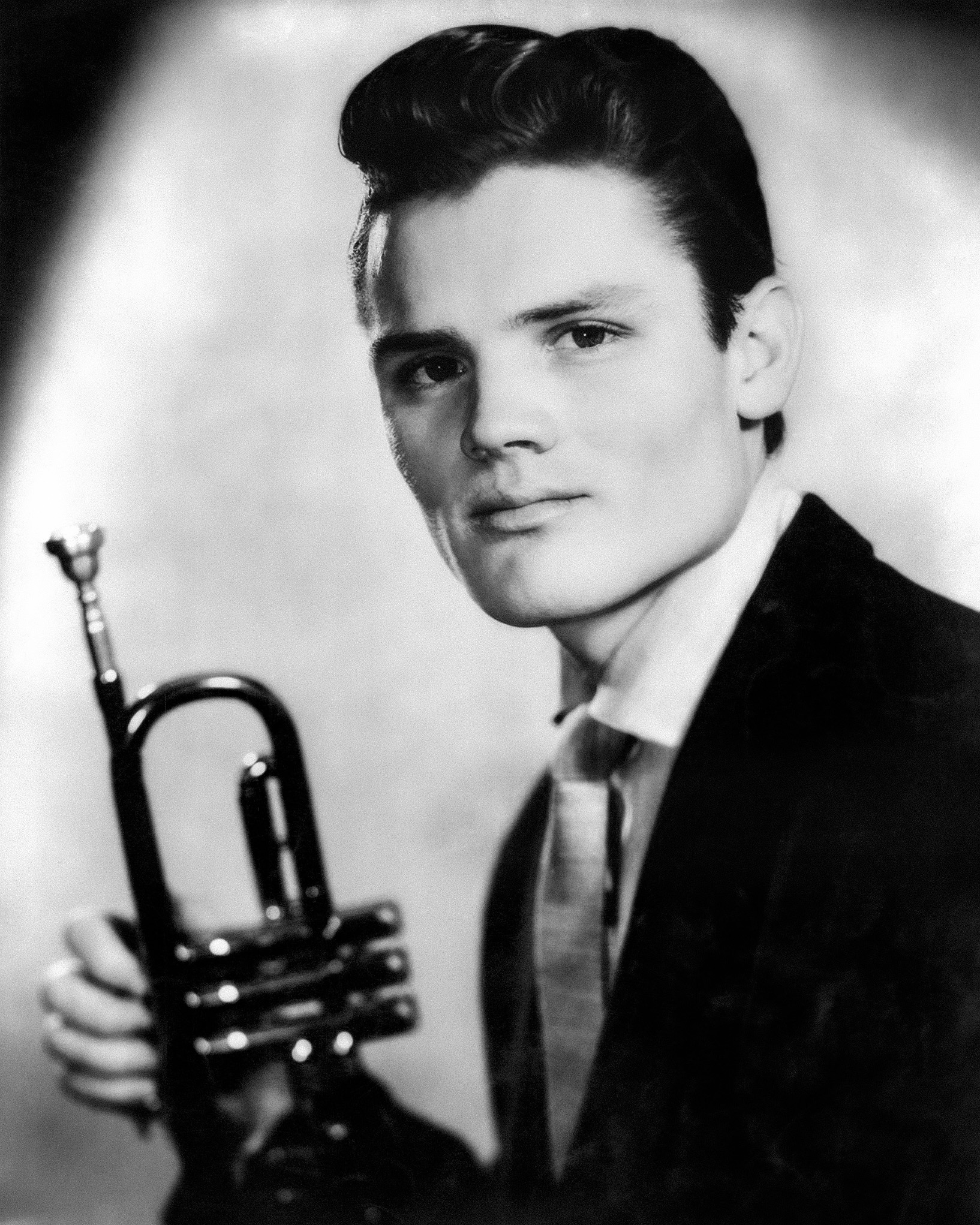
Chet Baker worked with Evans on his album Chet in 1958–1959.

That year, Evans also met bassist Scott LaFaro while auditioning him for a place in an ensemble led by trumpeter Chet Baker, and was impressed. LaFaro joined his trio three years later.

Evans also performed on albums by Charles Mingus, Oliver Nelson, Tony Scott, Eddie Costa, and Art Farmer.

=== Work with Miles Davis, Everybody Digs Bill Evans, and Kind of Blue ===
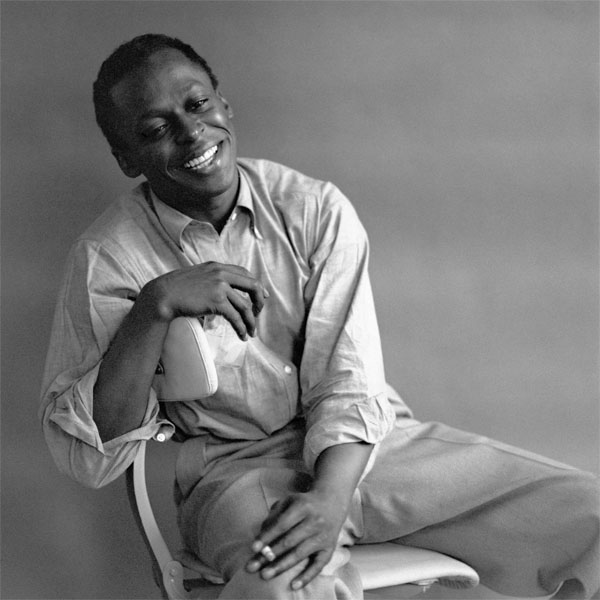
Miles Davis in 1955, three years before meeting Evans.

In February 1958, at Miles Davis's urging, Russell drove Evans to the Colony Club in Brooklyn to play with Davis's sextet. At this time, John Coltrane, Cannonball Adderley, Paul Chambers, and Philly Joe Jones were the other members of Davis's group. Red Garland had recently been fired, and Evans knew he was not merely filling in for one night but auditioning to become the group's regular pianist. By the end of the night, Davis told Evans that he would play their next engagement in Philadelphia. The band had been known for playing a mixture of jazz standards and bebop originals, but by the time Evans arrived, Davis had begun his venture into modal jazz, having just released his album Milestones.

Evans formally joined Davis's group in April 1958. The band appeared in radio broadcasts on Saturday nights and, on May 3, the new formation made its first broadcast from Café Bohemia (its usual locale). The live radio appearance broadcast on May 17, 1958, and also released on the album titled Makin' Wax, is the earliest documented evidence of collaboration between Evans and Davis. By mid-May, Jimmy Cobb replaced Philly Joe Jones, with whom Evans had developed a close friendship. On May 26, Evans made his first studio recordings with Davis, which were first issued as part of Jazz Track, and later reissued on 1958 Miles.

A performance of the Ballets Africains from Guinea in 1958 sparked Davis's interest in modal music. This music stayed for long periods of time on a single chord, weaving in and out of consonance and dissonance. Another influence was George Russell's treatise. Both influences coalesced in Davis's conception of modal jazz offering an alternative to chord changes and major/minor key relationships, relying instead on a series of modal scales. He realized that Evans, who had worked with Russell, could follow him into modal music. At the same time, Evans introduced Davis to 20th-century classical composers such as Sergei Rachmaninoff, Maurice Ravel, and Aram Khachaturian.

The band's mostly black followers did not react favorably to the replacement of Garland with a white musician. Davis used to tease him, and Evans's sensitivity perhaps let it get to him. But the band began to find a new, smoother groove, as Adderley recalled: "When he started to use Bill, Miles changed his style from very hard to a softer approach."

Bill had this quiet fire that I loved on piano. The way he approached it, the sound he got was like crystal notes or sparkling water cascading down from some clear waterfall. I had to change the way the band sounded again for Bill's style by playing different tunes, softer ones at first.

— Miles Davis

In July 1958, Evans appeared as a sideman on Adderley's album Portrait of Cannonball, featuring the first performance of "Nardis", specially written by Davis for the session. While Davis was not very satisfied with the performance, he said that from then on, Evans was the only one to play it in the way he wanted. The piece came to be associated with Evans's future trios, which played it frequently.

By the end of the summer, Davis knew Evans was quickly approaching his full professional development and that he would soon leave Davis's group. That year, Evans won the DownBeat International Critics' Poll for his work with Davis and his album New Jazz Conceptions.

In September 1958, Evans recorded as a sideman in Art Farmer's album Modern Art, also featuring Benny Golson. All three had won the DownBeat poll. Later, Evans deemed this record one of his favorites. During this period, despite all the successes, Evans was visiting a psychiatrist, as he was unsure whether he wanted to continue as a pianist.

Evans left Davis's sextet in November 1958 and stayed with his parents in Florida and his brother in Louisiana. While he was burned out, one of the main reasons for leaving was his father's illness. During this sojourn, the always self-critical Evans suddenly felt his playing had improved. "While I was staying with my brother in Baton Rouge, I remember finding that somehow I had reached a new level of expression in my playing. It had come almost automatically, and I was very anxious about it, afraid I might lose it."

Shortly after, he moved back to New York, and in December Evans recorded the trio album Everybody Digs Bill Evans for Riverside Records with bassist Sam Jones and drummer Philly Joe Jones. This was Evans's second album as a leader, the first since New Jazz Conceptions, recorded two years earlier. While Keepnews had often tried to persuade Evans to make a second trio recording, the pianist felt he had nothing new to say until then. He had also been too busy traveling with Davis to make a record.

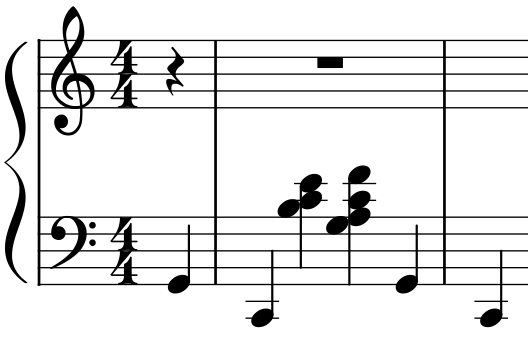
Evans built "Peace Piece" on a simple one-bar ostinato left-hand figure in C major. Over this static harmonic frame, he freely improvised melodies.

One of the pieces to appear on the album was Leonard Bernstein's "Some Other Time". Evans started to play an introduction using an ostinato figure. But, according to Keepnews, who was present, Evans spontaneously started to improvise over that harmonic frame, creating the recording that would be named "Peace Piece". According to Evans: "What happened was that I started to play the introduction, and it started to get so much of its own feeling and identity that I just figured, well, I'll keep going." But Gretchen Magee has said the piece was penned as an exercise during Evans's college years, and Peri Cousins says that Evans often played the piece at home.

Evans returned to the Davis sextet in early 1959, at the trumpeter's request, to record Kind of Blue, often considered the best-selling jazz album of all time.

As usual, during the sessions of Kind of Blue, Davis called for almost no rehearsal and the musicians had little idea what they were to record. Davis had given the band only sketches of scales and melody lines on which to improvise. Once the musicians were assembled, Davis gave brief instructions for each piece and then set about taping the sextet in studio.

During the creative process of Kind of Blue, Davis handed Evans a piece of paper with two chords—G minor and A augmented—and asked "What would you do with that?" Evans spent the next night writing what became "Blue in Green". But when the album came out, the song was attributed exclusively to Davis. When Evans suggested he deserved a share of the royalties, Davis offered him a check for $25. Evans also wrote the liner notes for Kind of Blue, comparing jazz improvisation to Japanese visual art. By the fall of 1959, Evans had started his own trio with Jimmy Garrison and Kenny Dennis, but it was short-lived.

Sometime during the late 1950s, most probably before joining Davis, Evans began using heroin. Philly Joe Jones has been cited as an especially bad influence in this regard. Davis seems to have tried to help Evans kick his addiction, but failed.

Evans's first long-term romance was with a black woman named Peri Cousins (for whom "Peri's Scope" was named), during the second half of the 1950s. The couple had problems booking hotels during Evans's gigs, since most did not allow interracial couples. By the turn of the decade, Evans had met a waitress named Ellaine Schultz, who became his partner for 12 years.

=== Piano trios featured on commercially released recordings ===
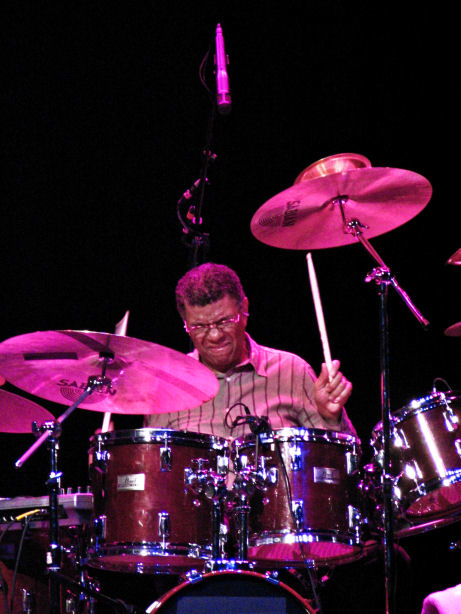
Jack DeJohnette performed with Bill Evans trio at the Montreux Jazz Festival and other events

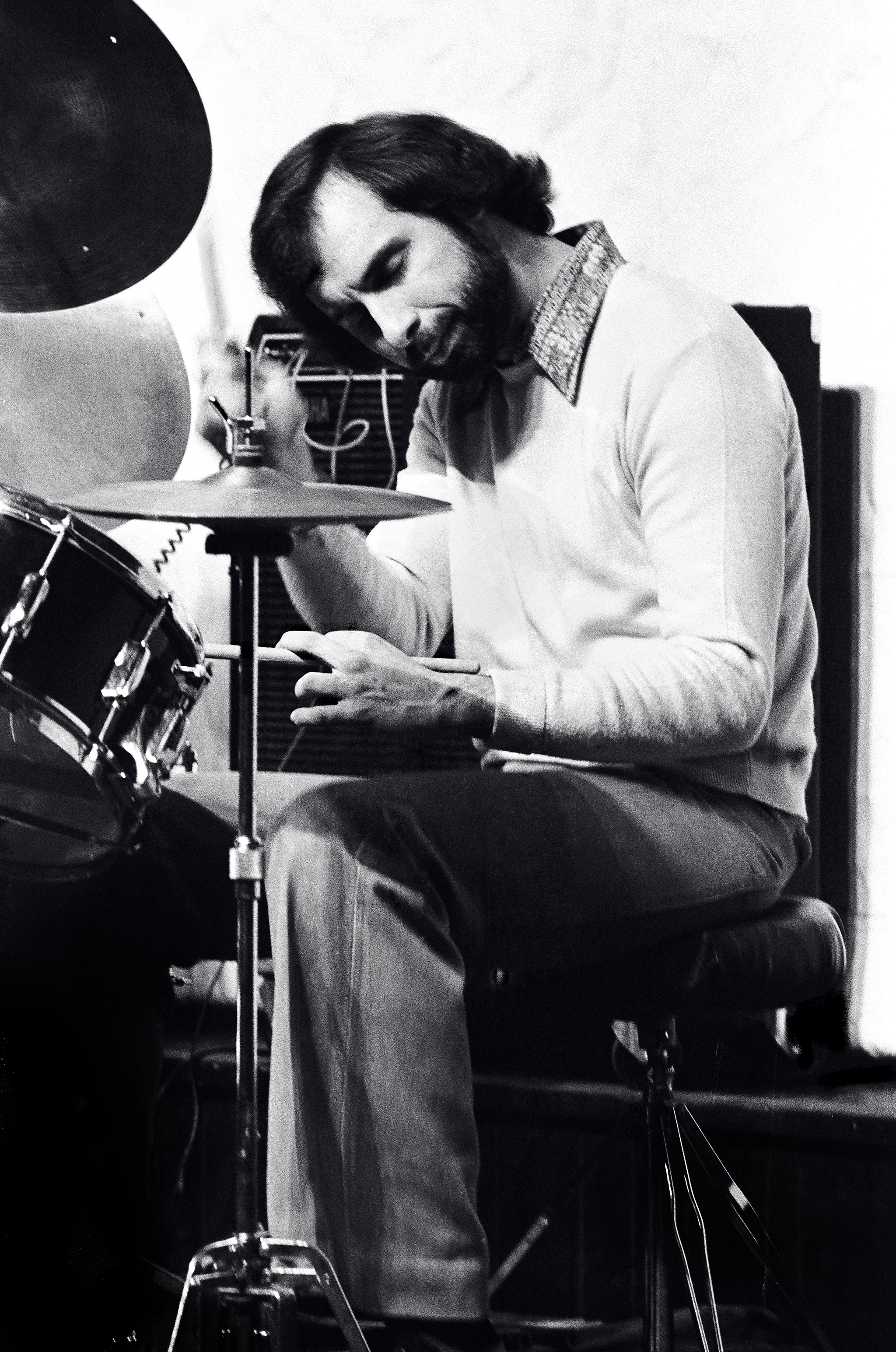
Joe LaBarbera performed with Bill Evans trio in 1979–1980

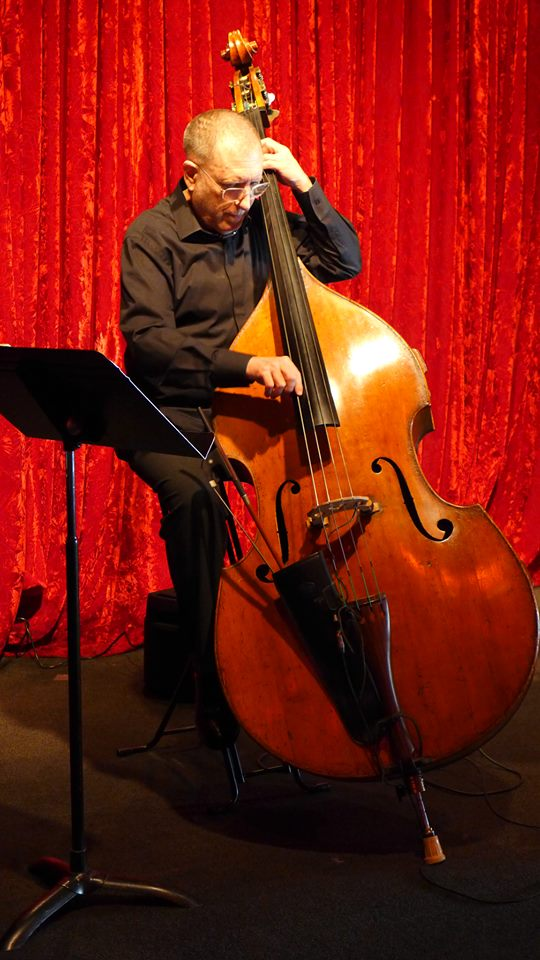
Chuck Israels performed with Bill Evans trio in 1962–1966

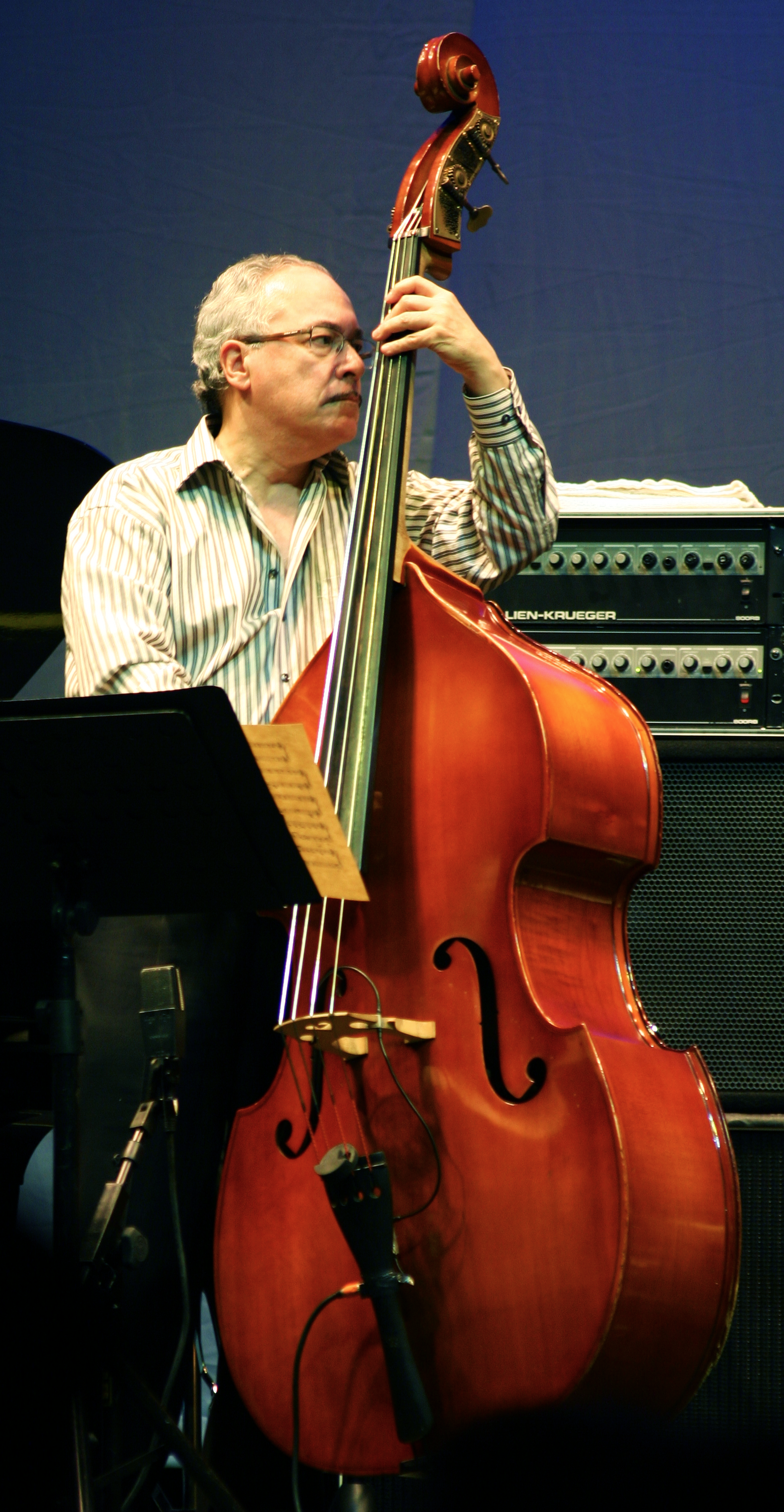
Eddie Gomez performed with Bill Evans trio in 1964–1974

1956	with Teddy Kotick (bass), Paul Motian (drums)
1958	with Sam Jones (bass), Philly Joe Jones (drums) (studio group only)
1959	with Paul Chambers (bass), Philly Joe Jones (drums) (studio group only)
1960–1961	with Scott LaFaro (bass), Paul Motian (drums)
1962	with Chuck Israels (bass), Paul Motian (drums)
1962	with Monty Budwig (bass), Shelly Manne (drums) (studio group only)
1963–1965	with Chuck Israels (bass), Larry Bunker (drums)
1964	with Gary Peacock (bass), Paul Motian (drums)
1966	with Chuck Israels (bass), Arnold Wise (drums)
1966	with Eddie Gómez (bass), Shelly Manne (drums) (studio group only)
1967	with Eddie Gómez (bass), Philly Joe Jones (drums)
1967–1968	with Eddie Gómez (bass), Jack DeJohnette (drums)
1968–1974	with Eddie Gómez (bass), Marty Morell (drums)
1976–1977	with Eddie Gómez (bass), Eliot Zigmund (drums)
1978	with Michael Moore (bass), Philly Joe Jones (drums)
1979–1980	with Marc Johnson (bass), Joe LaBarbera (drums)

==== Trio with Scott LaFaro and Paul Motian ====
We needed people that were interested in each other, so that we could spend a year or two just growing, without ambitions, just allowing the music to grow. And allowing our talents to merge in a very natural way.

— Evans in interview with George Clabin, 1966

In mid-1959, Evans was performing at Basin Street East and was visited by bassist Scott LaFaro, who was playing with singer and pianist Bobby Scott at a club around the corner. LaFaro expressed interest in forming a trio, and suggested Paul Motian, who had appeared on Evans's album New Jazz Conceptions, as the drummer. The trio with LaFaro and Motian became one of the most celebrated piano trios in jazz. With this group, Evans's focus settled on traditional jazz standards and original compositions, with an added emphasis on interplay among band members. Evans and LaFaro achieved a high level of musical empathy. In December 1959 the band recorded its first album, Portrait in Jazz, for Riverside Records.

In early 1960, the trio began a tour that brought it to Boston, San Francisco (at Jazz Workshop), and Chicago (at the Sutherland Lounge). After returning to New York in February, the band performed at Town Hall on a multi-artist bill, and then began a residency at Birdland. While the trio produced no studio records in 1960, two bootleg recordings from radio broadcasts from April and May were illegally released in the early 1970s, infuriating Evans. They were posthumously issued as The 1960 Birdland Sessions.

In parallel with his trio work, Evans kept working as a backing musician for other leaders. In 1960, he performed on singer Frank Minion's album The Soft Land of Make Believe, featuring versions of the Kind of Blue compositions "Flamenco Sketches" and "So What" with added lyrics. That year, he also recorded The Soul of Jazz Percussion with Philly Joe Jones and Chambers.

In May 1960, the trio performed at one of the Jazz Profiles concerts, a series organized by Charles Schwartz. Around this time, Evans hired Monte Kay as his manager. During one of his concerts at the Jazz Gallery, Evans contracted hepatitis and went to his parents' house in Florida to recuperate. During this period, he also participated in the recordings The Great Kai & J. J. and The Incredible Kai Winding Trombones for Impulse! Records. In May and August 1960, Evans appeared on George Russell's album Jazz in the Space Age. In late 1960, he performed on Jazz Abstractions, an album recorded under the leadership of Gunther Schuller and John Lewis.

In February 1961, Evans's trio with Motian and LaFaro recorded Explorations, the group's second and final studio album. According to Keepnews, the recording sessions' atmosphere was tense, Evans and LaFaro having argued over extra-musical matters. Evans was also having headaches, and LaFaro was playing with a loaned bass. The disc features Evans's first trio version of "Nardis", the Miles Davis piece Evans had recorded with Cannonball Adderley for Portrait of Cannonball in 1958. Apart from "Nardis" and "Elsa", the album consisted of jazz standards. After the recording sessions, Evans was initially unwilling to release the album, believing the trio had played badly. But upon hearing the recording, he changed his mind, and later thought of it very favorably. Just after the Explorations sessions, he appeared as a sideman in Oliver Nelson's The Blues and the Abstract Truth.

In late June 1961, Riverside recorded Evans's trio live at the Village Vanguard, resulting in the albums Sunday at the Village Vanguard and Waltz for Debby. (Further recordings from this performance were issued in 1984 as More From The Vanguard.) Evans later showed special satisfaction with these recordings, seeing them as the culmination of his trio's musical interplay.

=== After LaFaro's death ===
The death of 25-year-old LaFaro in a car crash ten days after the Vanguard performances devastated Evans. He did not record or perform in public again for several months.

In October 1961, persuaded by Keepnews, Evans returned to the musical scene on the Mark Murphy album Rah. With new bassist Chuck Israels, in December they recorded a session for Nirvana with flutist Herbie Mann. In April and May 1962, Evans completed the duo album Undercurrent with guitarist Jim Hall.

After Evans re-formed his trio in 1962, two albums, Moon Beams and How My Heart Sings!, resulted. In 1963, at the beginning of his association with Verve, he recorded Conversations with Myself, an album that featured overdubbing, layering up to three tracks of piano for each song. The album won him his first Grammy award.

Evans's heroin addiction worsened after LaFaro's death. His girlfriend Ellaine Schultz was also an addict. Evans habitually borrowed money from friends, and eventually his electricity and telephone services were shut down. He said: "You don't understand. It's like death and transfiguration. Every day you wake in pain like death and then you go out and score, and that is transfiguration. Each day becomes all of life in microcosm."

Evans never allowed heroin to interfere with his musical discipline, according to a 2010 BBC article that contrasts his addiction with Chet Baker's. On one occasion while injecting heroin, Evans hit a nerve and temporarily disabled it, performing a full week's engagement at the Village Vanguard virtually one-handed. During this time, Helen Keane began to have an important influence, as she significantly helped maintain Evans's career despite his self-destructive lifestyle, and the two developed a strong friendship.

In summer 1963, Evans and Schultz left their flat in New York and settled in his parents' home in Florida, where, it seems, they quit the habit for some time. Even though never legally married, Bill and Ellaine were in all other respects husband and wife. At that time, Schultz meant everything to Evans, and was the only person with whom he felt genuine comfort.

Although he recorded many albums for Verve, their artistic quality has typically been viewed as uneven. Despite Israels's fast development and the creativity of new drummer Larry Bunker, the album Bill Evans Trio with Symphony Orchestra, featuring Gabriel Fauré's Pavane and works of other classical composers arranged by Claus Ogerman divided critical opinion. Some recordings in unusual contexts were made, such as a concert recording with a big-band recorded at Town Hall that was never issued owing to Evans's dissatisfaction with it (although the more successful jazz trio portion of the concert was released). Live recordings and bootleg radio broadcasts from this period represent some of the trio's better work.

In 1965, the trio with Israels and Bunker went on a well-received European tour.

=== Bill Evans meets Eddie Gómez ===
In 1966, Evans met Puerto-Rico born, Juilliard-graduated bassist Eddie Gómez. In what turned out to be an 11-year stay, Gómez sparked new developments in Evans's trio conception. One of the most significant releases during this period is Bill Evans at the Montreux Jazz Festival (1968), which won him his second Grammy award. It has remained a critical favorite, and is one of two albums Evans made with drummer Jack DeJohnette.

Other highlights from this period include "Solo – In Memory of His Father" from Bill Evans at Town Hall (1966), which also introduced "Turn Out the Stars"; a second pairing with guitarist Jim Hall, Intermodulation (1966); and the solo album Alone (1968, featuring a 14-minute version of "Never Let Me Go"), that won his third Grammy award.

In 1968, drummer Marty Morell joined the trio, remaining until 1975, when he retired to family life. This was Evans's stablest, longest-lasting group. Evans had overcome his heroin habit and was entering a period of personal stability.

Between 1969 and 1970, Evans recorded From Left to Right, featuring his first use of electric piano.

Between May and June 1971, Evans recorded The Bill Evans Album, which won two Grammy awards. This all-originals album (four new) also featured alternation between acoustic and electric piano. One track was "Comrade Conrad", a tune that had originated as a Crest toothpaste jingle and later been reelaborated and dedicated to Conrad Mendenhall, a friend who had died in a car crash.

Other albums included The Tokyo Concert (1973); Since We Met (1974); and But Beautiful (1974; released in 1996), featuring the trio plus saxophonist Stan Getz in live performances in the Netherlands and Belgium. Morell was an energetic, straight-ahead drummer, unlike many of the trio's former percussionists, and many critics feel that this was a period of little growth for Evans. After Morell left, Evans and Gómez recorded two duo albums, Intuition and Montreux III.

In the early 1970s, Evans was caught at New York's John F. Kennedy International Airport with a suitcase containing heroin. Although the police put him in jail for the night, he was not charged, but both he and Schultz had to begin methadone treatment.

In 1973, while working in Redondo Beach, California, Evans met and fell in love with Nenette Zazzara, despite his long-term relationship with Schultz. When Evans broke the news to Schultz she pretended to understand, but then died by suicide, throwing herself under a subway train. Evans's relatives believe that Schultz's infertility coupled with Bill's desire to have a son may have influenced those events. As a result, Evans went back on heroin for a while before resuming methadone treatment. In August 1973, Evans married Nenette, and in 1975 they had a child, Evan. The new family, which also included Evans's stepdaughter Maxine, lived in a large house in Closter, New Jersey. They remained very close and Nenette and Bill remained married until Evans's death.

In 1974, Evans recorded a multimovement jazz concerto written for him by Claus Ogerman, Symbiosis.

=== Collaboration with Tony Bennett ===
There is an intriguing juxtaposition of opposites running through the music—Bennett the expansive, heart on sleeve, vibrato man, Evans the inward looking aesthete—which makes for charged listening, if charged is an adjective which can be applied to something so relaxed. And the projects were genuinely collaborative, with the artists on an equal footing: Evans solos wonderfully throughout and Together Again actually starts with a solo piano piece, "The Bad And The Beautiful", put there at Bennett's suggestion to emphasize that this wasn't just a vocalist-with-accompanist affair. ... By the time Bennett and Evans made the second album they'd been performing live together for a year and their partnership, comfortable enough though it was on the first album, is noticeably better oiled.

— Chris May on The Complete Tony Bennett/Bill Evans Recordings

During the mid-1970s Evans collaborated with the singer Tony Bennett on two critically acclaimed albums: The Tony Bennett/Bill Evans Album (1975) and Together Again (1977). Bennett initiated the collaboration. The two respected each other's talent, and performed together for about two years. Although Evans was using cocaine regularly during this period, he was reportedly sober when recording the albums with Bennett.

Both Bennett and Evans said it was not just a singer-and-accompanist affair but rather a joint creative effort to enhance some well-known hits with a new twist on familiar melodies and harmonies. Bennett encouraged Evans's harmonically sophisticated arrangements and extended solos to emphasize equally valuable input from both musicians. Bennett and Evans recorded the first album in four studio sessions in June 1975, and the second in four studio sessions in September 1976. Between the two recordings, they performed live as a duo, featuring songs from their recordings, including "But Beautiful", "Days of Wine and Roses", and "Dream Dancing".

=== Last years ===
In 1975, Morell was replaced by drummer Eliot Zigmund. Several collaborations followed, and the trio did not record an album until 1977. Both I Will Say Goodbye (Evans's last album for Fantasy Records) and You Must Believe in Spring (for Warner Bros.) highlighted changes that became significant in the last stage of Evans's life. Greater emphasis was placed on group improvisation and interaction, and new harmonic experiments were attempted.

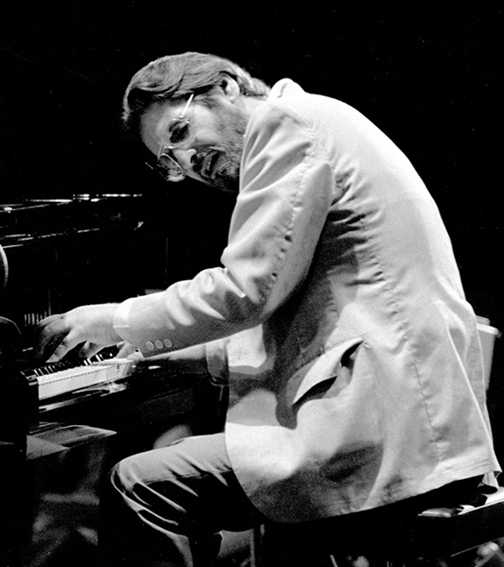
Evans performing at the Montreux Jazz Festival with his trio consisting of Marc Johnson, bass, and Philly Joe Jones, drums, July 13, 1978.

Gómez and Zigmund left Evans in 1978. Evans then asked Philly Joe Jones, the drummer he considered his "all-time favorite", to fill in. Several bassists were tried, with Michael Moore staying the longest. Evans finally settled on Marc Johnson on bass and Joe LaBarbera on drums. This trio was Evans's last. In April 1979, Evans met Laurie Verchomin, a Canadian waitress (later, a writer) with whom he had a relationship until his death. Verchomin was 28 years younger.

At the beginning of a several-week tour of the trio through the Pacific Northwest in the spring of 1979, Evans learned that his brother, Harry, who had been diagnosed with schizophrenia, had died by suicide at age 52. This news shocked him deeply, and some of the concerts were canceled. His friends and relatives believe Harry's death precipitated his own death the next year.

Marc Johnson recalled: "This fateful trip marks ... the beginning of the end. Bill's willingness to play and work decreased noticeably after the death of Harry, actually it was just the music itself that held him upright. He fulfilled his obligations because he needed money, but these were the few moments in his life when he felt comfortable—the times in between must have been depressing, and he barely showed a willingness to live."

In August 1979, Evans recorded his last studio album, We Will Meet Again, featuring a composition of the same name written for his brother. The album won a Grammy award posthumously in 1981, along with I Will Say Goodbye.

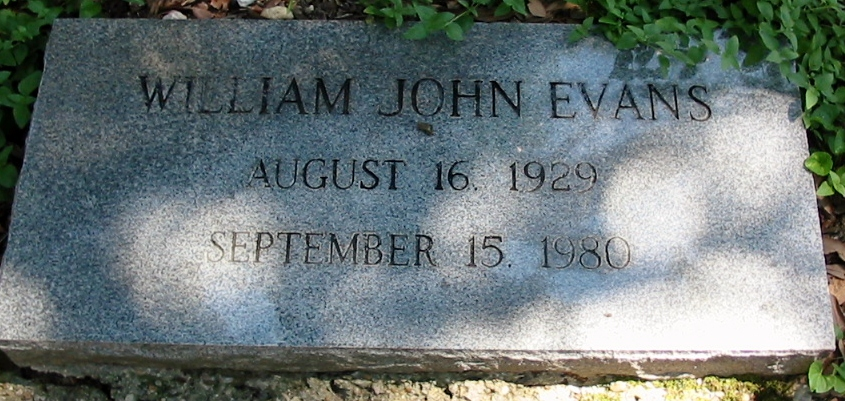
Evans is buried at Roselawn Memorial Park and Mausoleum, Baton Rouge, East Baton Rouge Parish, Louisiana, Section 161, Plot K.

During the late 1970s, Evans kicked his heroin habit, with the help of methadone, only to become addicted to cocaine. He started with one gram per weekend, but later started taking several grams daily. Harry's death may also have influenced his emotional state after 1979. His sister-in-law Pat Evans has said she knew Bill would not last long after Harry died and wondered whether that is what prompted her to buy three plots in the Baton Rouge Cemetery where Harry was interred. Evans voluntarily quit his treatment for chronic hepatitis. Laurie Verchomin has said that Evans was sure that he would die in a short time.

== Death ==
On September 15, 1980, Evans, who had been in bed for several days with stomach pains at his home in Fort Lee, was accompanied by Joe LaBarbera and Verchomin to the Mount Sinai Hospital in New York City, where he died that afternoon. The cause of death was a combination of peptic ulcer, cirrhosis, bronchial pneumonia, and untreated hepatitis. Evans's friend Gene Lees called Evans's struggle with drugs "the longest suicide in history".

Evans was interred in Baton Rouge next to his brother. Services were held in Manhattan on September 19. A tribute, planned by producer Orrin Keepnews and Tom Bradshaw, was held on September 22 at the Great American Music Hall in San Francisco. Fellow musicians paid homage to Evans in the first days of the 1980 Monterey Jazz Festival, which opened that week: Dave Brubeck played his own "In Your Own Sweet Way" on the 19th, The Manhattan Transfer followed on the 20th, and John Lewis dedicated "I'll Remember April". In 1981, Pat Metheny and Lyle Mays released the piece "September Fifteenth (dedicated to Bill Evans)" on their album As Falls Wichita, So Falls Wichita Falls.

== Music and style ==
Evans is credited as creating some new harmonies, like the quartal voicing Mark Levine calls "So What" chord; first appearing in the opening track of Kind of Blue.

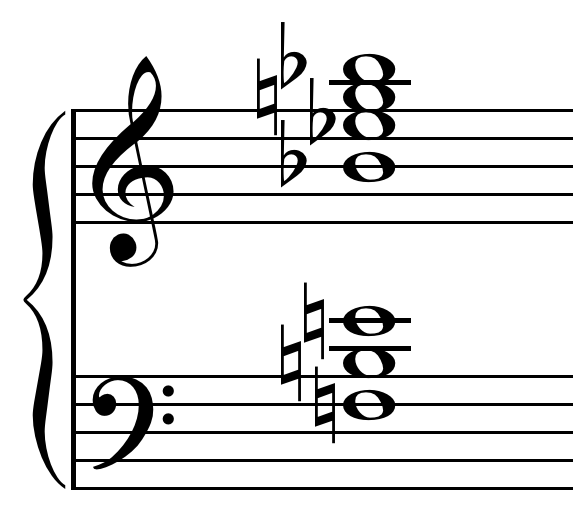
A Viennese trichord as a part of 6-Z17, an altered dominant tritone substitution (Db7alt) in the key of C, from Evans's opening to "What Is This Thing Called Love?".

Evans is credited with influencing the harmonic language of jazz piano. His harmonic language was influenced by impressionist composers such as Claude Debussy and Maurice Ravel. His versions of jazz standards, as well as his own compositions, often feature thorough reharmonizations. Other features include added tone chords, modal inflections, unconventional substitutions, and modulations.

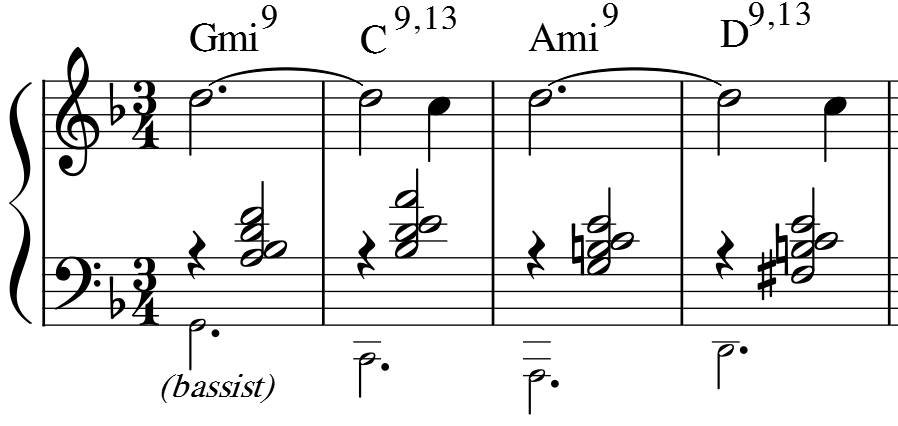
An example of Evans's harmonies. The chords feature extensions like 9ths and 13ths, are laid around middle C, have smooth voice leading, and leave the root to the bassist. Bridge of the first chorus of "Waltz for Debby" (mm.33–36). From the 1961 album of the same name.

One of Evans's distinctive harmonic traits is excluding the root in his chords, leaving it to the bassist, played on another beat of the measure, or just left implied. "If I am going to be sitting here playing roots, fifths and full voicings, the bass is relegated to a time machine." This idea had already been explored by Ahmad Jamal, Erroll Garner, and Red Garland. In Evans's system, the chord is expressed as a quality and a color. Most of his harmonies feature added-note chords or quartal voicings. Thus, Evans created a self-sufficient language for the left hand, a distinctive voicing, that allowed the transition from one chord to the next while hardly having to move the hand. With this technique, he created an effect of continuity in the piano's central register. Lying around middle C, in this region the harmonic clusters sounded the clearest and at the same time left room for contrapuntal independence with the bass.

Evans's improvisations relied heavily on motivic development, either melodically or rhythmically. Motives may be broken and recombined to form melodies. Another characteristic of Evans's style is rhythmic displacement. His melodic contours often describe arches. Other characteristics include melodic sequencing and motivic transformation. He could play with one hand in 4/4 and the other momentarily in 3/4.

At the beginning of his career, Evans used block chords heavily. He later reduced his use of them. During a 1978 interview, Marian McPartland asked: "How do you think your playing has changed since you first started? Is it deliberate or is it just happening to change? Evans replied: "Well, it's deliberate, but I stay along the same lines ... I try to get a little deeper into what I'm doing. As far as that kind of playing goes [jazz playing rather than an earlier example where he played "Waltz for Debbie" without any improvisation or sense of swing], I think my left hand is a little more competent and of course I worked a lot on inner things happening like inner voices I've worked on."

The first line of "Time Remembered", as penned by Evans in the early 1970s.

At least during his late years, Evans's favorite keys to play in were A and E. Evans greatly valued Bach's music, which influenced his playing style and helped him gain good touch and finger independence. "Bach changed my hand approach to playing the piano. I used to use a lot of finger technique when I was younger, and I changed over to a weight technique. Actually, if you play Bach and the voices sing at all, and sustain the way they should, you really can't play it with the wrong approach." Evans valued Bach's "The Well-Tempered Clavier" and "Two- and Three-Part Inventions" as excellent practice material.

In an interview with Len Lyons, Evans said, "for me, technique is the ability to translate your ideas into sound through your instrument."

=== Influences ===
In a 1964 interview, Evans called Bud Powell his single greatest influence. Biographer Peter Pettinger notes that Evans "assimilated 'a thousand influences'", including pianists Dave Brubeck, George Shearing, Oscar Peterson, Al Haig, and Lou Levy, and horn players Miles Davis, Dizzy Gillespie, Charlie Parker, and Stan Getz. "The biggest influence on Evans [in his early days], though, was the pianism of Nat 'King' Cole", whom Evans called "one of the tastiest and just swingin'est and beautifully melodic improvisers and jazz pianists that jazz has ever known, and he was one of the very first that really grabbed me hard." Pettinger also notes that the "work of the pianist Lennie Tristano, with his cool approach to a line" was an important influence on Evans, and Lyons observes that Tristano preceded Evans in his use of overdubbing piano tracks. Evans was also heavily influenced by his deep studies of European classical music: "The constructional knowledge of music that Evans later brought to jazz was firmly rooted in this European tradition, as was his thoroughly trained and exquisitely refined touch at the keyboard."

As a composer, Evans also assimilated and amalgamated jazz, popular, and classical influences in an "utterly logical" manner. His compositional style shows similarities to and the influence of some of the composers whose works he often played, such as Earl Zindars and Michel Legrand. J. William Murray wrote, "Evans was very adept at drawing Western European compositional techniques into jazz and there are elements of Bach, Chopin, Debussy, and Ravel in his writing."

=== Views on contemporaneous music tendencies ===
Evans's career began just before the rock explosion in the 1960s. During this decade, jazz was swept into a corner, and most new talents had few opportunities to gain recognition, especially in America. Evans believed he had been lucky to gain exposure before this profound change in the music world, and never had problems gaining bookings and recording opportunities.

Evans never embraced new music movements; he kept his style intact. For example, he lamented watching Davis shift his style towards jazz fusion and blamed the change on commercial considerations. Evans said, "I would like to hear more of the consummate melodic master [Davis], but I feel that big business and his record company have had a corrupting influence on his material. The rock and pop thing certainly draws a wider audience. It happens more and more these days, that unqualified people with executive positions try to tell musicians what is good and what is bad music." Still, Evans and Davis kept in touch throughout their lives.

Evans considered himself an acoustic pianist, but from the 1970 album From Left to Right onward, he also released some material with Fender-Rhodes piano intermissions. But unlike other jazz pianists (such as Herbie Hancock), he never fully embraced the new instrument, and invariably returned to the acoustic sound. "I don't think too much about the electronic thing, except that it's kind of fun to have it as an alternate voice. ... [It's] merely an alternate keyboard instrument that offers a certain kind of sound that's appropriate sometimes. I find that it's a refreshing auxiliary to the piano but I don't need it ... I don't enjoy spending a lot of time with the electric piano. I play it for a period of time, then I quickly tire of it, and I want to get back to the acoustic piano." He said electronic music "just doesn't attract me. I'm of a certain period, a certain evolution. I hear music differently. For me, comparing electric bass to acoustic bass is sacrilege."

== Repertoire and compositions ==
Evans's repertoire consisted of established jazz standards, songs by contemporaries (some of which he helped make standards), and original compositions (some of which have also become standards). Among the major American songwriters, he was particularly drawn to the work of Jimmy Van Heusen, recording what was reputedly his favorite song, "But Beautiful", many times in various settings, as well as many other Van Heusen tunes. Contemporaries whose works he often played include Michel Legrand, Johnny Mandel, and Earl Zindars and, to a lesser extent, Burt Bacharach, John Lewis, Henry Mancini, Gary McFarland, Thelonious Monk, Claus Ogerman, Steve Swallow, and Denny Zeitlin. Other songs by his contemporaries and colleagues he recorded include "In Your Own Sweet Way" by Dave Brubeck, "You're Gonna Hear from Me" by André Previn, "The Peacocks" by Jimmy Rowles, "Dolphin Dance" by Herbie Hancock, and, atypically, "I Do It for Your Love" by Paul Simon, which nonetheless "continued to inspire the pianist's most complex thoughts" in his final years. "Nardis" by Miles Davis was a special signature tune, often performed in highly extended versions by his final trio.

During a radio interview, Marian McPartland listened to Evans play "Reflections in D" by Duke Ellington and later noted, "Sitting next to him, listening to the rise and fall of the melody, I realized that ... he chooses some of the most romantic, evocative tunes there are. The tune ended softly with a chord so perfect it took my breath away."

Evans composed more than 50 originals. Many were dedicated to people close to him, including "Waltz for Debby" for his niece; "For Nenette" for his wife; "Letter to Evan" for his son; "NYC's No Lark", an anagram of Sonny Clark in memory of the pianist; "Re: Person I Knew", an anagram of Orrin Keepnews; "We Will Meet Again" for his brother; "Peri's Scope" for Peri Cousins; "One for Helen" and "Song for Helen" for Helen Keane; "B minor Waltz (For Ellaine)" for Ellaine Schultz; "Laurie" for Laurie Verchomin; "Yet Ne'er Broken", an anagram of cocaine dealer Robert Kenney; "Maxine" for his stepdaughter; "Tiffany" for Joe LaBarbera's daughter; and "Knit For Mary F." for fan Mary Franksen from Omaha.

== Personal life ==
Evans was an avid reader, particularly of philosophy and humor. His shelves held works by Plato, Voltaire, Whitehead, Santayana, Freud, Margaret Mead, Sartre, and Thomas Merton and he had a special fondness for Thomas Hardy's work. He was fascinated with Eastern religions and philosophies including Islam, Zen, and Buddhism. Evans introduced John Coltrane to the philosophy of Krishnamurti.

Evans liked to paint and draw. He was also a keen golfer, a hobby that began on his father's golf course. Evans had a fondness for horse racing and frequently gambled hundreds of dollars, often winning. During his last years, he owned a racehorse named "Annie Hall" with producer Jack Rollins.

In 1973, Evans abandoned Ellaine Schultz, his partner of 12 years, to pursue Nenette Zazzara. Schultz then died by suicide, throwing herself in front of a subway train.

Evans married Zazzara in August 1973. They met while his trio was performing at Howard Rumsey's club Concerts By The Sea in Redondo Beach, California, where Zazzara was a part-time waitress. They had a son, Evan Edward Evans, in 1975.

Evans was in a relationship with Laurie Verchomin from April 1979 until his death.

== Reception ==
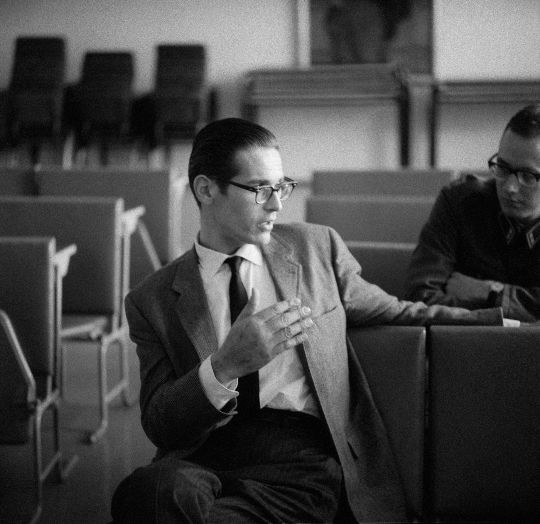
Evans in Helsinki in 1964.

Music critic Richard S. Ginell wrote: "With the passage of time, Bill Evans has become an entire school unto himself for pianists and a singular mood unto himself for listeners. There is no more influential jazz-oriented pianist—only McCoy Tyner exerts nearly as much pull among younger players and journeymen."

During his short tenure with Davis in 1958, when the band left New York to go on the road, Evans sometimes received cold receptions from the mostly black audiences. Evans later acknowledged that some felt his presence threatened the black pride aspect of Davis's band's success. Pettinger believed in a recording, for his solo on a tune named "Walkin'", Evans received noticeably less applause than the other soloists, and for that on "All Of You", none at all. Davis and the other band members responded, "he's supposed to be there, Miles wants him there", on the bandstand whenever audience members made comments. Davis wrote in his autobiography that Evans was sensitive to the criticism. It might have been a contributing factor to his leaving the band after just seven months.

When Ken Burns's television miniseries Jazz was released in 2001, it was criticized for neglecting Evans's work after his departure from Davis's sextet.

== Legacy and influence ==
Author and jazz pianist Len Lyons wrote: "Evans was the most influential pianist of the 1960's. The tone, touch, texture, and harmonic richness of his playing affected the majority of pianists who followed him." Evans has left his mark on such players as Herbie Hancock, Chick Corea, Paul Bley, Keith Jarrett, Steve Kuhn, Warren Bernhardt, Michel Petrucciani, John Taylor, Vince Guaraldi, Stefano Bollani, Don Friedman, Marian McPartland, Denny Zeitlin, Bobo Stenson, Fred Hersch, Frank Kimbrough, Bill Charlap, Lyle Mays, Eliane Elias, Diana Krall, Ralph Towner, John McLaughlin, Lenny Breau, Rick Wright of Pink Floyd, Denis Matsuev, Bruce Hornsby, and many other musicians in jazz and other music genres. His recordings have been transcribed and arranged by Jed Distler and others and recorded by classical musicians such as the Kronos Quartet, Jean-Yves Thibaudet, Roy Eaton, and Igor Levit.

Evans's style has also influenced some contemporary classical composers. The English composer Gavin Bryars wrote "My First Homage" in 1978 "to Bill Evans," the composer explained, "and, more particularly, to the trio that he had from 1959-1961," which "affected me deeply when I first began playing jazz seriously." Bryars also notes that the title of the piece "uses the same initials as ... 'My Foolish Heart'." The 15-minute work is scored principally for two pianos but also for two vibraphones, tuba, and sizzle cymbal and was recorded by Bryars and others in February 1981, shortly after Evans's death.

The noted Hungarian composer György Ligeti admired Evans and acknowledged his influence in an interview, adding, "As far as touch is concerned, Bill Evans is a sort of Michelangeli of jazz" (in reference to the great classical pianist Arturo Benedetti Michelangeli). Ligeti's Fifth Piano Étude (1985), subtitled "Arc-en-ciel" ("Rainbow"), demonstrates this influence clearly, and Ligeti even hand-wrote in the margin of the score, "Play it like Bill Evans." Likewise, American minimalist composer and keyboardist Terry Riley included Evans in "the Pantheon of my teachers and heroes" in the liner notes to his solo piano Lisbon Concert. In 2025, composer John Williams premiered a Piano Concerto, the second movement of which is modeled on Evans's style.

Many of Evans's own compositions, such as "Waltz for Debby", "Peace Piece", "Blue in Green", "Very Early", "Time Remembered", "Turn Out the Stars", "We Will Meet Again", and "Funkallero", have become oft-recorded jazz standards, and his early death inspired the composition of two widely covered tribute songs, Phil Woods's "Goodbye, Mr. Evans" and Don Sebesky's "I Remember Bill".

During his lifetime, Evans received 31 Grammy nominations and seven Awards. In 1994, he posthumously received the Grammy Lifetime Achievement Award.

The Bill Evans Jazz Festival at Southeastern Louisiana University began in 2002. A Bill Evans painting hangs in the Recital Hall lobby of the Department of Music and Performing Arts. The Center for Southeastern Louisiana Studies at the Simms Library holds the Bill Evans archives. He was named Outstanding Alumnus of the year in 1969.

Evans influenced the character Seb's wardrobe in the 2016 film La La Land.

The 2026 biographical film Everybody Digs Bill Evans, directed by Grant Gee, dramatises a traumatic period of Evans's life following the tragic death of bassist Scott LaFaro in 1961. The film was written by Mark O’Halloran, based on the 2013 novel Intermission by Owen Martell.
