= Suite Três Rios =

Studio album by Dan Costa
- Released: 2016
- Genre: Jazz
- Producer: Dan Costa

Dan Costa chronology
| Suite Três Rios (2016) | Skyness (2018) |

Suite Três Rios is a jazz/world music album by Dan Costa. Recorded in Rio de Janeiro, the album features legendary Brazilian artists such as Jaques Morelenbaum, Marcos Suzano and Leila Pinheiro, and was mixed by Jan Erik Kongshaug. It was considered one of the best of 2016 by DownBeat.

== Reception ==
Professional ratings
Review scores
| Source | Rating |
|---|---|
| All About Jazz | 4.5/5 stars |
| DownBeat | 4/5 stars |

"Costa's melodic sensibility shines throughout", according to DownBeat critic Carlo Wolff, who considered the album "finely crafted" and "an entrancing homage to Brazil". All About Jazz critic Paul Naser says: "Brazilian jazz, like its American counterpart, has fondly remembered its roots as it unabashedly moves forward". The tunes Chorinho, Baião and Maracatu have been used as instructional material.

== Awards ==
The album won a Global Music Award in 2016.

== Track listing ==
1. Alba (featuring Jaques Morelenbaum)
2. Chorinho
3. Samba
4. Bossa Nova (featuring Leila Pinheiro)
5. Baião (featuring Marcos Suzano)
6. Maracatu
7. Modinha (featuring Teco Cardoso)
8. Aria

== Personnel ==
- Piano, compositions, arrangements, production - Dan Costa
- Guitar, executive co-production - Ricardo Silveira
- Alto and tenor sax - Marcelo Martins
- Trombone - Vittor Santos
- Double bass - Alberto Continentino
- Drums - Rafael Barata
- Cello - Jaques Morelenbaum
- Voice - Leila Pinheiro
- Percussion - Marcos Suzano
- Baritone sax - Teco Cardoso
