= Skyness =

Studio album by Dan Costa
- Released: 2018
- Genre: Jazz
- Producer: Dan Costa

Dan Costa chronology
| Suite Três Rios (2016) | Skyness (2018) |

Skyness is the second album by Dan Costa. Recorded in Italy, the album features several renowned artists, such as bossa nova icon Roberto Menescal, Romero Lubambo, Nelson Faria and Seamus Blake. It was considered "rare and luxurious" by All About Jazz.

== Reception ==
Professional ratings
Review scores
| Source | Rating |
|---|---|
| All About Jazz | 4.5/5 stars |

All About Jazz praises the album for its "lovely melodies, sophisticated harmonies, and soulful contributions of seven world- class artists", while Raul da Gama from World Music Report considers Costa "deeply gifted". The track "Compelling (ft. Teco Cardoso)" was dubbed 'uplifting' and featured by JAZZIZ magazine in their summer album., while Leitão commends the album for "excellent music and exceptional artistic quality".

== Track listing ==
1. "Prologue"
2. "Tempos Sentidos" (featuring Roberto Menescal & Jorge Helder)
3. "Compelling" (featuring Teco Cardoso)
4. "Lisbon Skyline" (featuring Custodio Castelo)
5. "Intracycle"
6. "Sete Enredos" (featuring Romero Lubambo)
7. "Iremia"
8. "Lume" (featuring Nelson Faria)
9. "Skyness" (featuring Seamus Blake)

== Personnel ==
- Piano, compositions, production - Dan Costa
- Acoustic guitar - Roberto Menescal
- Double bass - Jorge Helder
- Flute - Teco Cardoso
- Portuguese guitar - Custodio Castelo
- Acoustic guitar - Romero Lubambo
- Electric guitar - Nelson Faria
- Tenor sax - Seamus Blake
