= Jasil Brazz =

Studio album by Herbie Mann
- Released: 1987
- Genre: Jazz
- Label: RBI
- Producer: Herbie Mann

Herbie Mann chronology
See Through Spirits	Jasil Brazz (1987)	Herbie Mann and Jasil Brazz (1988)

Jasil Brazz is a 1987 album by jazz flautist Herbie Mann. It features two of the members of Trio da Paz as well and Brazilian trumpeter Claudio Roditi and Mark Soskin on synthesizers.

== Reception ==
Professional ratings
Review scores
Source	Rating
AllMusic	3/5 stars

AllMusic called it "one of Mann's best albums of that decade".

A reviewer for Billboard wrote: "Thanks to Brazilian influence, this set is not as commercially crass as many of Mann's late-'70s crossover attempts."

P.J. Birosik of Yoga Journal described the album as "feel-good music for fans of both new age jazz and world music," and noted "the music's innate sensuality." He stated that Mann's "performances of these deceptively simple compositions are impassioned and precise, allowing his band a chance to breathe and explore the music's dynamics."

== Concert video ==
Jasil Brazz is also the title of a Mann concert film. That performance features Marc Cohen on piano, Paul Sokolow on bass and Ricky Sebastian and Cyra Baptista on percussion.

== Track listing ==
=== Side one ===
1. "Guarde Nos Olhos" (Ivan Lins, Victor Martins) – 5:59
2. "Beiral" (Djavan) – 6:12
3. "Esquinas" (Djavan) – 5:49
4. "Sonhos" (Ivan Lins, Victor Martins) – 7:35

=== Side two ===
1. "Victoriosa" (Ivan Lins, Victor Martins) – 5:20
2. "Little Chick A Dee" (Sy Johnson) – 13:24
3. "Luas De Peqium" (Ivan Lins, Victor Martins) – 5:28

== Personnel ==
- Herbie Mann - flutes
- Mark Soskin - synthesizers
- Romero Lubambo - guitar
- Claudio Roditi - trumpet (track 4)
- Paul Socolow - bass
- Duduka da Fonseca - drums
- Steve Barta - piano
