= Nelson Faria =

Brazilian guitarist

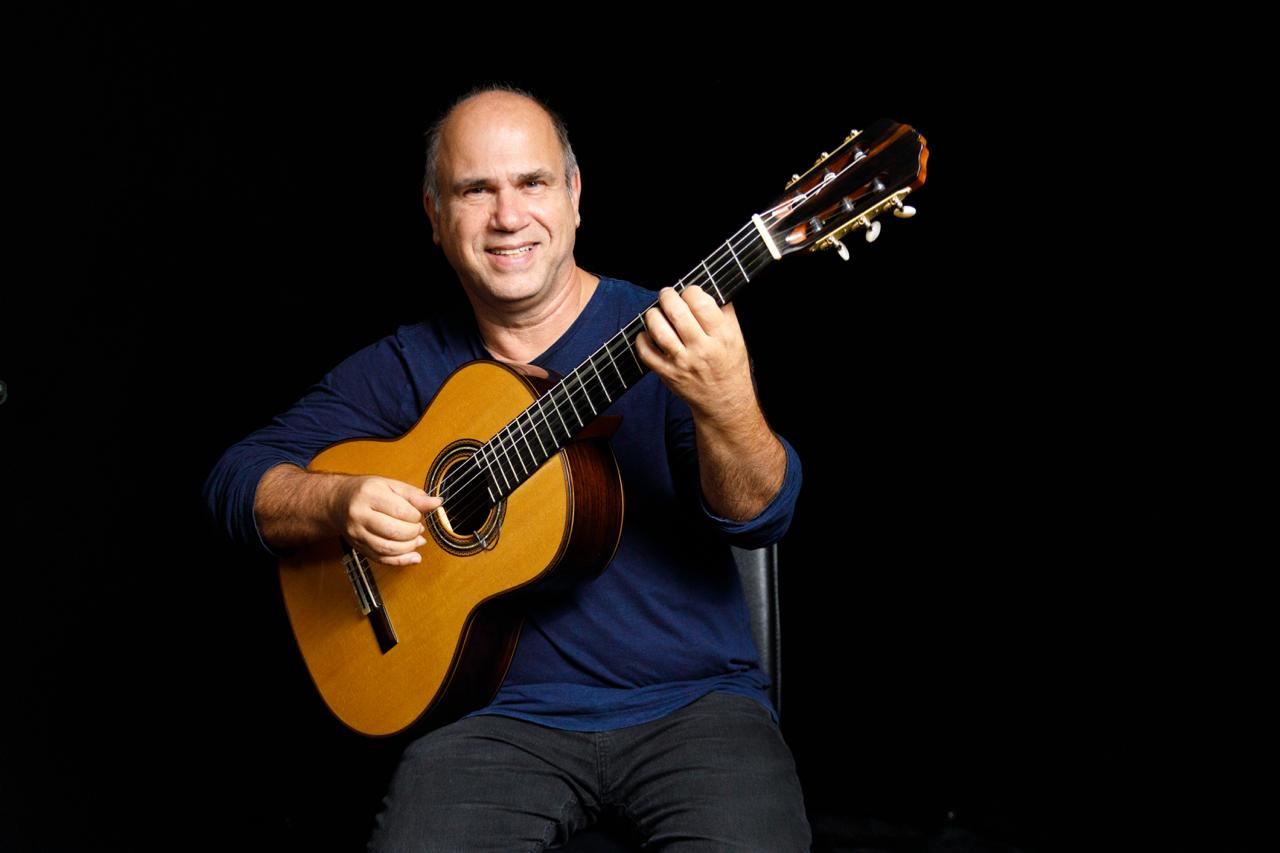
- Nelson Faria playing guitar

Background information
- Born: March 23, 1963 (age 63); Belo Horizonte, Brazil
- Genres: Jazz, Brazilian jazz
- Occupation: Musician
- Instrument: Guitar
- Years active: 1990–present
- Website: www.nelsonfaria.com

Nelson Faria (born March 23, 1963) is a Brazilian guitarist.

== Career ==
At the Guitar Institute of Technology in California, his teachers included Joe Diorio, Frank Gambale, Ted Greene, Scott Henderson, and Joe Pass. On television he performed with Paulo Moura on Rhapsody in Bossa, with Baby do Brasil on Acústico, and with Leila Pinheiro on Na Ponta da Língua. His debut album, Ioiô, was released in 1993. He recorded a Brazilian tribute to the Beatles with Bororó, Marcos Suzano, and José Namen. Faria has also recorded with Nana Caymmi, Zélia Duncan, Cris Delanno, Cássia Eller, Edu Lobo, Dan Costa (musician) and Milton Nascimento.

== Discography ==
- Ioiô (Perfil, 1993)
- Janelas Abertas (Lumiar Discos, 1999)
- Beatles, um tributo Brasileiro (Solo Music, 1999)
- Nelson Faria (G&F, 2003)
- Vento Bravo (2005)
- Buxixo with Gilson Peranzzetta (Delira, 2009)
- Leila Pinheiro, Banda Pequi e Nelson Faria (UFG, 2010)
- Live in Frankfurt (2011)
- Ceu e Mar with Leila Pinheiro (Far Out, 2012)
- Na esquina de Mestre Mignone with Gustavo Tavares (2012)

== DVDs ==
- Toques de Mestre (Giannini SA, 1990)
- Nosso Trio Live (Delira, 2006)

== Books ==
- A Arte da Improvisação (Lumiar Editora, 1991)
- The Brazilian Guitar Book (Sher Music, 1996)
- Escalas, Arpejos e Acordes para violao e guitarra (Lumiar Editora, 1999)
- Inside the Brazilian Rhythm Section (Sher Music, 2002)
- Toque Junto Bossa Nova (Lumiar Editora, 2008)
- Harmonia Aplicada ao Violão e à Guitarra (Vitale, 2010)
