= Rhythm Rocker =

Rhythm Rocker may refer to:

- Rick Rillera and the Rhythm Rockers, featuring Richard Berry
- Crazy Cavan and the Rhythm Rockers, Welsh band
- The Rhythm Rockers, Robert Valdez, Gil Roman and David Perper
- Kawasaki Rhythm Rocker, a synthesizer
