= Take a Chance (Joanne Brackeen album) =

Studio album by Joanne Brackeen
- Released: May 24, 1994
- Recorded: June 15–16, 1993
- Genre: Jazz
- Length: 66:05
- Label: Concord Picante; CCD-4602
- Producer: Allen Farnham, Paul Wickliffe

Joanne Brackeen chronology
Turnaround (1992)	Take a Chance (1994)	Power Talk (1995)

Take a Chance is an album by American pianist Joanne Brackeen recorded in 1993 and released on the Concord Jazz label. It is Brakeen's second album of Brazilian music following 1991's Breath of Brazil.

== Reception ==
Professional ratings
Review scores
Source	Rating
AllMusic	4/5 stars

AllMusic reviewer Scott Yanow stated "This is a delightful set ... The pianist stretches the songs a bit in spots but never neglects their melodies or the original moods. Well worth several listens". In JazzTimes, Sunsh Stein stated "Joanne Brackeen's passion permeats everything she plays ... Her feel for Brazilian music also seems innate, as evidenced by this recording and its predecessor Breath of Brasil ... The band confidently carries the listener through the many moods of Brackeen's Brazil".

== Track listing ==
All compositions by Joanne Brackeen except where noted.

1. "Recado Bossa Nova" (Luiz Antonio, Djalma Ferreira) – 7:00
2. "Children's Games" (Antônio Carlos Jobim) – 7:57
3. "Estaté" (Bruno Martino, Bruno Brighetti) – 5:34
4. "Canção do Sal" (Milton Nascimento) – 5:53
5. "Frevo" (Egberto Gismonti) – 6:26
6. "Mountain Flight" (Toninho Horta) – 5:21
7. "The Island" (Ivan Lins, Vítor Martins) – 6:14
8. "Take a Chance" – 4:17
9. "Ponta de Areia" (Nascimento) – 4:07
10. "Duduka" – 4:46
11. "Mist on a Rainbow" – 4:50

== Personnel ==
- Joanne Brackeen – piano
- Eddie Gómez – bass
- Duduka da Fonseca – drums
- Waltinho Anastácio – percussion, vocals (track 9)
