= Duduka Da Fonseca =

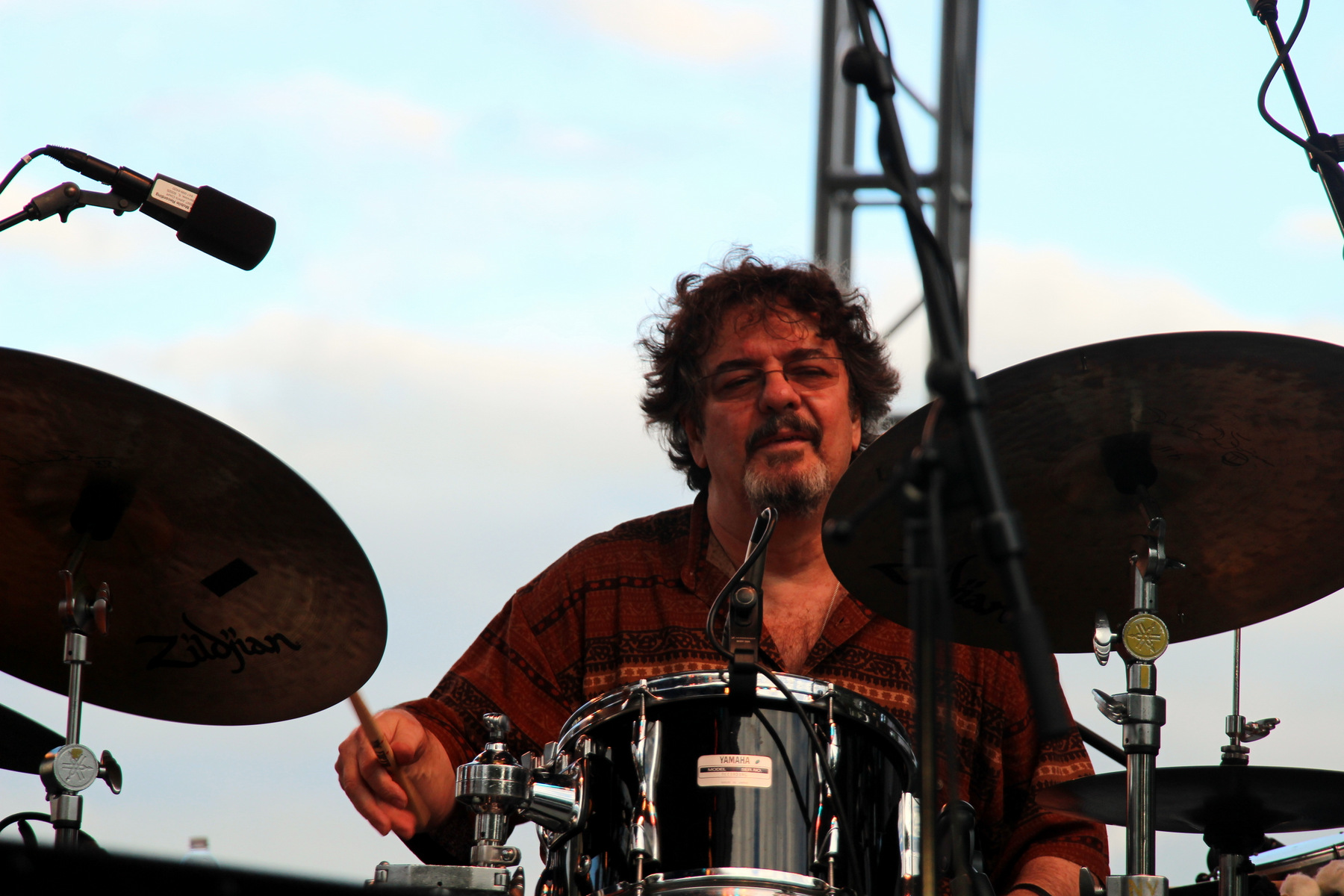

Background information
- Born: Eduardo Moreira Da Fonseca; 31 March 1951 (age 75); Rio de Janeiro, Brazil
- Genres: Jazz, Brazilian jazz, world fusion
- Occupation: Musician
- Instrument: Drums
- Years active: 1964–present
- Labels: Sunnyside, Zoho
- Website: dudukadafonsecatrio.com

Duduka Da Fonseca, born Eduardo Moreira Da Fonseca (Rio de Janeiro, March 31, 1951) is a Brazilian jazz drummer who is a founding member of Trio da Paz with Romero Lubambo and Nilson Matta. He leads the Duduka da Fonseca Trio, with David Feldman and Guto Wirtti. Duduka is a resident of New York City.

== Biography ==
Born in Rio de Janeiro, Da Fonseca started playing drums when he was thirteen. He moved to New York City in 1975 and was the founder and leader of Brazilian All Stars, Brazilian Express, and the New York Samba Band. He was a teacher at the Drummers Collective and wrote an instructional book, Brazilian Rhythms for Drumset. Since 1986, he has been a founding member and co-leader of Trio da Paz, a band he started with bassist Nilson Matta and guitarist Romero Lubambo.

At fourteen, while living in Rio, Duduka formed his first Samba Jazz Trio, Bossa Trio, with his brother Miguel playing bass. In his 20s, Duduka co-founded Mandengo, a Samba Jazz Sextet featuring Raul Mascarenhas (tenor sax), Mauro Senise (alto sax), Barrozinho (trumpet), Tony Botelho (acoustic bass), and Tomás Improta (piano). Mandengo performed together for many years until Duduka moved to New York in 1975.

In New York, Duduka followed his dream of playing with American jazz musicians where he could blend musical cultures. To date, he has recorded and performed with Gerry Mulligan, Phil Woods, Kenny Barron, Lee Konitz, Eddie Gomez, Joanne Brackeen, Herbie Mann, Sadao Watanabe, Joe Henderson, David Amram, George Mraz, Emily Remler, Nancy Wilson, Slide Hampton, Rufus Reid, Steve Allee, John Scofield, Wayne Shorter, John Patitucci, Martin Wind, Wolfgang Lackerschmid, Tom Harrell, Joe Lovano, Jorge Dalto, Paquito D’Rivera, Dick Oatts, Dennis Irwin, Billy Drewes, Kenny Werner, David Sanchez, Marc Copland, Renee Rosnes, Bill Charlap, Harry Allen, Larry Goldings, Jessica Molaskey, John Pizzarelli, and others.

In addition to the artists listed above, Duduka has played and recorded with many Brazilian artists: Antonio Carlos Jobim, Dom Salvador, Sergio Barrozo, Rio 65 Trio, Haroldo Mauro Jr., Astrud Gilberto, Toninho Horta, Airto Moreira, Raul de Souza, Claudio Roditi, Ion Muniz, Edson Lobo, Alfredo Cardim, Nico Assumpção, Tenório Jr., Cesarius Alvim, Ricardo Santos, Edison Maciel, Naná Vasconcelos, Carlos Barbosa-Lima, Paulo Jobim, Daniel Jobim, Jaques Morelenbaum, Mario Adnet, Maucha Adnet, Chico Adnet, Elza Soares, OSESP (São Paulo Symphony Orchestra, Jobim Sinfônico), Milton Nascimento, Dori Caymmi, Oscar Castro-Neves, and others.

Duduka is also a 4-time Grammy nominee. In 2002 his first solo album, Samba Jazz Fantasia, was nominated for an American Grammy Award. He is one of the very few Brazilians and the only Brazilian drummer thus far to be nominated. In 2009, he was nominated for a Latin Grammy as the co-leader of The Brazilian Trio for their album Forests.

Duduka has established numerous Brazilian Jazz groups among them Brasilian Express, which appeared on PBS in 1981. Duduka’s New York Samba Band performed at many jazz venues including the Blue Note, Fat Tuesdays and the Village Gate. In 1986 he formed The Brazilian Jazz All Stars, featuring artists Bob Mintzer, Randy Brecker, Eliane Elias, Romero Lubambo, Nilson Matta and Guilherme Franco.

Duduka was a founding member and co-leader of Trio da Paz, nominated for an Indie Award as Best Latin Jazz Group in 1993 and their recording Partido Out won the Jazz Journalists Association Awards for best Brazilian Jazz Album of 2002. In 2016, the trio also won the Hot House NYC Award for the best group for 30. The album was also nominated for a Grammy in the Best Latin Jazz category.

In 2002 he formed the Duduka Da Fonseca Quintet featuring Anat Cohen, Guilherme Monteiro, Helio Alves, and Leonardo Cioglia.

Their second album, Samba Jazz-Jazz Samba, was among the ten best albums of the year in Jazziz magazine. The Quintet has performed in the Umbria Jazz Festival and Tudo é Jazz Festival in Ouro Prêto.

Since 2007, Duduka Da Fonseca has had a project with pianist Helio Alves, featuring vocalist Maucha Adnet, called Samba Jazz & The Music of Jobim. This show has been presented annually at Dizzy’s Club Coca Cola (JALC), as well as other venues and festivals around the globe.

In 2009 Duduka formed the Duduka Da Fonseca Trio featuring David Feldman on piano and Guto Wirtti on acoustic bass.

In 2020 Duduka was nominated for the Grammy Award for the album Sorte!: Music by John Finbury, Thalma de Freitas with Victor Gonçalves, John Patitucci, Chico Pinheiro, Airto Moreira, Rogério Boccato.

In 2021, he formed Duduka Da Fonseca & Quarteto Universal featuring Vinicius Gomes on guitar, Helio Alves on piano, and Gili Lopes on bass. In 2022, they released an album, Yes!!, on Sunnyside Records to positive reception from critics.

== Discography ==
=== As leader/co-leader ===
- Samba Jazz Fantasia (Anzic, 2002)
- Transition with Dom Salvador (Lua Discos, 2003)
- Samba Jazz in Black and White with Duduka Da Fonseca Quintet (Zoho Music, 2006)
- Samba Jazz - Jazz Samba (Anzic, 2012)

With Duduka Da Fonseca Trio

- Plays Toninho Horta (Zoho Music, 2011)
- New Samba Jazz Directions (Zoho Music, 2013)
- Jive Samba (Zoho Music, 2015)
- Plays Dom Salvador (Sunnyside, 2018)

With Trio da Paz

- Brasil from the Inside (Concord Picante, 1992)
- Black Orpheus (Kokopelli, 1994)
- Partido Out (Malandro, 1998)
- Café (Malandro, 2002)
- Somewhere (Blue Toucan, 2006)
- Live at JazzBaltica (MAXJAZZ, 2008)
- 30 (Zoho Music, 2011)

With Quarteto Universal

- Yes!!! (Sunnyside Records, 2022)

With The Brazilian Trio

- Forests (Zoho Music, 2008)
- Constelação (Motema, 2013)

With others

- HD2, Songs from the Last Century (Blue Toucan, 2005)
- DNA Bossa Trio, DNA Bossa Trio (CID, 2007)
- Our Thing, Manhattan Style (JazzHeads, 2017)
- Duduka Da Fonseca & Helio Alves featuring Maucha Adnet, Samba Jazz and Tom Jobim (Sunnyside, 2019)

=== As sideman ===
With Joanne Brackeen

- Breath of Brazil (Concord Picante, 1991)
- Take a Chance (Concord Picante, 1993)

With Astrud Gilberto

- Astrud Gilberto Plus the James Last Orchestra (Polydor, 1986)
- Temperance (Pony Canyon, 1997)
- Live in New York (Pony Canyon, 1999)

With Antônio Carlos Jobim

- Antonio Brasileiro ( Columbia, 1994)
- Jobim Sinfônico (Biscoito Fino, 2004)

With Lee Konitz

- Brazilian Rhapsody (Venus, 1995)
- Brazilian Serenade (Venus, 1996)

With Wolfgang Lackerschmid

- Samba Gostoso (Hipjazz, 2016)
- Studio Konzert (Neuklang, 2018)

With Mario Adnet

- Pedra Bonita (Biscoito Fino, 1998)
- Para Gershwin E Jobim (Universal, 2004)

With Herbie Mann

- Jasil Brazz (RBI, 1987)
- 65th Birthday Celebration (WEA, 1997)
- America/Brasil (WEA, 1997)

With John Pizzarelli

- Midnight McCartney (MPL, 2015)
- Sinatra & Jobim @ 50 (Concord Jazz, 2017)

With Rufus Reid

- Hues of a Different Blue (Motema, 2011)
- Out Front (Motema, 2011)
- Terrestrial Dance (Newvelle, 2017)

With Claudio Roditi

- Two of Swords (Candid, 1991)
- Double Standards (Reservoir, 1997)
- Brazilliance (Resonance, 2009)
- Simpatico (Resonance, 2010)

With others

- Toshiko Akiyoshi, Yes I Have No 4BEAT Today (Ninety-One, 1995)
- Harry Allen, Eu Nao Quero Dancar (I Won't Dance) (RCA Victor, 1998)
- Helio Alves, Trios (Reservoir, 1998)
- David Amram, Latin-Jazz Celebration (Elektra Musician, 1983)
- Kenny Barron, Canta Brasil (Sunnyside, 2002)
- Beastie Boys, Hello Nasty (Capitol, 1998)
- Charlie Byrd, My Inspiration (Concord Picante, 1999)
- Cameo, Word Up! (Atlanta Artists 1986)
- Ana Caram, Maracana (Chesky, 1993)
- Anat Cohen, Noir (Anzic, 2007)
- Alexis Cole, Close Your Eyes (Venus, 2014)
- Jacob Fischer, Black Orpheus (Venus, 2013)
- Joel Frahm, Caminhos Cruzados (Venus, 2010)
- Thalma de Freitas, Sorte! (Green Flash Music 2019)
- George Garzone & Trio Da Paz, Night of My Beloved (Venus, 2008)
- Ken Hatfield, Dyad Arthur (Circle, 2000)
- Vincent Herring, Jobim for Lovers (MusicMasters, 1999)
- The Thad Jones/Mel Lewis Orchestra, Can I Persuade You? (Planet Arts 2001)
- Joyce, Language and Love (Verve, 1991)
- Susannah McCorkle, Sabia (Concord Jazz, 1990)
- Jessica Molaskey, Portraits of Joni (Ghostlight, 2017)
- Othello Molineaux, It's About Time (Big World 1993)
- Gerry Mulligan, Paraiso (First Impression, 2015)
- Nate Najar, Aquarela Do Brasil (Candid, 2014); I'm All Smiles (Blue Line 2006)
- New York Voices, What's Inside (GRP, 1993)
- John Patitucci, Communion (Concord Jazz, 2001)
- Ivo Perelman, Man of the Forest (GM, 1994)
- Dave Pietro, Embrace: Impressions of Brazil (A- 2004)
- Emily Remler, This Is Me (Justice, 1990)
- Renee Rosnes, Life on Earth (Blue Note, 2001)
- Dom Salvador, Dom Salvador Trio (Biscoito Fino 2007)
- John Scofield, Quiet (Verve, 1996)
- Steve Turre, Woody's Delight (HighNote, 2012)
- Nancy Wilson, A Nancy Wilson Christmas (MCG, 2001)
- John Zorn, The Big Gundown (Nonesuch, 1985)
