= Dan Costa (musician) =

British jazz pianist and composer (born 1989)

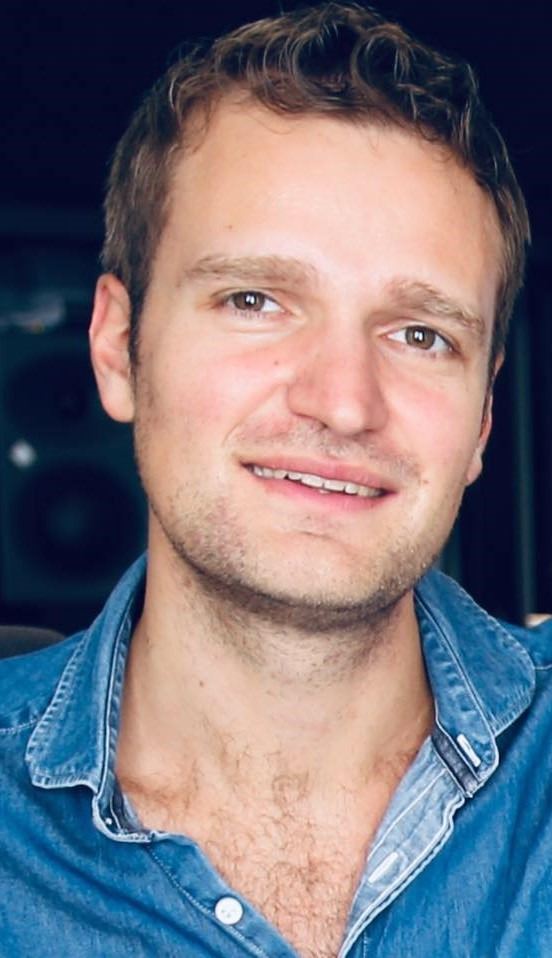
- Costa in 2018

Background information
- Born: 7 April 1989 (age 37); Westminster, London, England
- Genres: Jazz; world music; Latin jazz; Brazilian jazz
- Occupations: Pianist; composer; writer; educator
- Website: dancosta.net

Daniel Greco Costa (born 7 April 1989) is a British, Italian, and Portuguese jazz/world music pianist and composer. He is known for his original work and for his collaborations with artists such as Randy Brecker, Ron Carter, John Patitucci, Mike Stern, Hermeto Pascoal, Dave Liebman, Ivan Lins, Bob Mintzer, Seamus Blake, Dave Douglas, Romero Lubambo, Leila Pinheiro, Marcos Suzano, Jaques Morelenbaum and Roberto Menescal. His music has been featured by publications such as Rolling Stone and DownBeat, which considered his music "entrancing." Costa has worked as an educator and writer as well.

== Education ==
Costa was born in Westminster, London, to Italian and Portuguese parents from Sorrento and Porto respectively.

He studied classical piano as well as jazz piano at the Académie de Musique Rainier III in Monaco for six years prior to taking a diploma at Sir Paul McCartney's Liverpool Institute for Performing Arts in England. He then focused on jazz at the Escola Superior de Música, Artes e Espetáculo in Portugal, graduating with distinction and a Rotary Club Award for outstanding achievement. During his course, he was also awarded an Ibero-American grant to study Brazilian music at UNICAMP in São Paulo, Brazil as an international exchange student, focusing on both popular and classical composers. He pursued further studies at Berklee College of Music with a merit scholarship. Costa also has university degrees in philosophy, applied linguistics and history, having worked extensively as an educator in related fields.

He has written about music and other fields for publications such as Oxford Research Encyclopedias. In the article on tempo for Encyclopaedia Britannica, he covered classical, popular and world music genres, and referred to it as "the heartbeat of expression".

== Musical career ==
Costa's career took off when he recorded his debut album Suite Três Rios in Rio de Janeiro, Brazil, whose name and concept were inspired by the confluence of rivers in the Amazon as well as the country's rhythmic diversity. It won a silver medal at the Global Music Awards and was considered one of the best albums of 2016 by DownBeat. Critic Carlo Wolff praised Costa's melodic sensibility, concluding that "the thoroughly cosmopolitan, classically trained Costa has delivered a finely crafted album". All About Jazz underlined the historical dimension of the album, stating that "Brazilian jazz, like its American counterpart, has fondly remembered its roots as it unabashedly moves forward." The release was among the best-selling albums on the iTunes Portugal Chart, and peaked at number 5 on the Roots Music Report Jazz Chart in the United States, while the track "Bossa Nova" (feat. Leila Pinheiro) was in the Top 10 on the Jazz Song Chart. Costa collaborated with Jaques Morelenbaum, Leila Pinheiro, Marcos Suzano, Ricardo Silveira, Rafael Barata and Jan Erik Kongshaug, amongst others.

He recorded his second album, Skyness, at Arte Suono, Italy, in 2018, featuring Nelson Faria, Roberto Menescal, Romero Lubambo, Seamus Blake, Custodio Castelo, Jorge Helder and Teco Cardoso. Former editor of the journal of the British Music Society Jonathan Woolf wrote that the album offered further evidence of Costa's "highly accomplished pianism and of the fruitful musical associations he has made", adding that it was "an enjoyable, life-affirming and finely recorded album." Deemed "rare and luxurious" by All About Jazz, it was released at the Blue Note in Rio de Janeiro and was featured in a documentary by Radio Monte-Carlo in Milan, Italy. World Music Report's Raul da Gama called Costa "deeply gifted", as the album displayed "some of the finest piano music you might ever hear."

Costa took the album on a tour which included Italy, Portugal, Cyprus, Brazil, Malta, Spain, Turkey, Greece, Armenia, Lebanon and Egypt, where he was featured by Al-Arab, which considered his music a message of love and intercultural communication. He also toured Northern India, where he was featured and interviewed by Rolling Stone, while India Today in Delhi wrote that he "took the packed venue by storm." During the tour, he did masterclasses at schools such as Berklee partner Global Music Institute.

In 2020, Costa recorded "Love Dance" in Lisbon with one of the song's creators, Ivan Lins. Jazziz Magazine wrote that the recording was "rich with feeling and understated virtuosity," adding that "the song is something of a modern standard, with definitive versions recorded by George Benson and Sarah Vaughan; this take surely belongs beside them." Costa was interviewed by Rádio e Televisão de Portugal with bossa nova legend Roberto Menescal; they talked about their collaboration and the origins of the Brazilian style. He released his first live and solo piano album, Live in California, which was praised for "profound expression" by Jazziz Magazine and came in second on Roots Music Report's Top Latin Jazz Album for the year of 2020 Chart. Jonathan Woolf commended Costa for playing "in great style with just the right kind of clarity of articulation allied to sensitivity of purpose" and highlighted his lyricism, enveloping warmth and colour.

In 2022, Costa rereleased the track "Iremia" as a message of peace, featuring trumpeter Randy Brecker. According to Jazziz Magazine, "although they're separated by 44 years and thousands of miles, Costa and Brecker share a rapport that truly elicits the song's warmth and humanity."

Costa recorded the album Beams in New York City with John Patitucci, Mike Stern, Dave Douglas, Hermeto Pascoal, Dave Liebman and other musicians. It won a gold medal at the Global Music Awards. In an interview with Musica Jazz, Costa talked about Beams as a celebration of light in physical and metaphysical forms, nature as a major source of inspiration and the use of harmonic colour to express life experiences. In the liner notes, Randy Brecker praised the interactions between the musicians and the intricacy of the compositions, concluding that the album consists of "lovely, heartfelt emotional music". Something Else Reviews writer Sammy Stein considered the album "a wonder, and a beautiful, peaceful listen", while Culture Jazz writer Yves Dorison underlined its "extreme finesse." All About Jazz stated that Beams displayed "some of the best atmospheric jazz you are likely to hear in 2023. Or any year." His track about childhood, "Acalantando", was among the best of the year for Süddeutsche Zeitung.

Costa toured Europe, Southeast Asia and Australasia, where he was featured by Otago Daily Times. He did masterclasses as a guest lecturer at institutions such as Mahidol University, Monash University, Australian National University, University of Auckland, and Victoria University of Wellington.

In 2024, Costa took his music to Mexico, inviting local musicians to celebrate and interact with indigenous forms of expression. He also toured Europe, Southeast Asia and Australasia for the second time. In an interview with Otago Daily Times, he spoke of music as a message, and underlined its ability to raise awareness of animal welfare, peace and human rights. He recalled his collaborations on tour with world music instruments such as Indian sarod, Syrian vocals and Kazakh dombra, underlining his respect for local traditions.

He did masterclasses at institutions such as Canadian International School (Singapore), University of New South Wales and Elizabeth College (Hobart), and was featured by media outlets such as Seven News, Berliner Zeitung and Bangkok Post.

Considered "a voice for the voiceless", his track "Paw Prints" was used by global organisation Four Paws in support of animal welfare, while "Encaminho" was named as one of the most popular jazz songs of 2024 by All About Jazz.

During his tour of the British Isles in 2025, he was a guest lecturer at the Royal Academy of Music, the Royal Northern College of Music and the Liverpool Institute for Performing Arts, while his tour of Southeastern Europe included interviews for Radio Romania and Jazz FM 100.8 Skopje in North Macedonia.

Costa's music has also been included in instructional material.

== Personal life ==
Costa has lived in eight countries and speaks eight languages.

== Discography ==
- Suite Três Rios – 2016
- Skyness – 2018
- Love Dance with Ivan Lins – 2020
- Live in California – 2020
- Iremia with Randy Brecker – 2022
- Beams – 2023
