= Canta Brasil =

Studio album by Kenny Barron
- Released: October 29, 2002
- Recorded: February 13–14, 2002
- Studio: Systems Two; Brooklyn, New York
- Genre: Jazz
- Length: 58:15
- Label: Sunnyside; SSC 3005
- Producer: Karen Kennedy

Kenny Barron chronology
| Freefall (2000) | Canta Brasil (2002) | Images (2003) |

Canta Brasil is an album by pianist Kenny Barron recorded in New York in 2002 and released on the Sunnyside label.

== Reception ==
Professional ratings
Review scores
| Source | Rating |
|---|---|
| Allmusic | 4.5/5 stars |
| The Penguin Guide to Jazz Recordings | 3/4 stars |

In the review on AllMusic, Judith Schlesinger noted "This release combines the elegant swing of nine-time Grammy-winner Kenny Barron with the first-call Brazilian rhythm section of Trio da Paz, an inspired cross fertilization that enhances both jazz and tropical elements ... This is an exceptionally well-paced, melodic, spirit-lifting CD. Recommended". On All About Jazz, Dave Nathan wrote "On this his latest release, Barron has returned to his love affair with the Brazilian genre which he first cataloged in his 1993 release Sambao ... he is joined by a group of contemporary Brazilian jazz artists musicians who, like him, have an ingrained feel for these unique rhythms and melodies".

== Track listing ==
All compositions by Kenny Barron except where noted.

1. "Zumbi" – 9:15
2. "Clouds" – 10:09
3. "Paraty" (Nilson Matta) – 7:27
4. "Until Then" – 7:11
5. "Bachiao" (Romero Lubambo) – 7:31
6. "Thoughts and Dreams" – 4:26
7. "This One" – 6:20
8. "Doña María" (Duduka da Fonseca) – 5:56

== Personnel ==
- Kenny Barron – piano
- Trio da Paz:
  - Romero Lubambo – guitar
  - Nilson Matta – bass
  - Duduka da Fonseca – drums
- Anne Drummond – flute
- Valtinho Anastacio – percussion
- Maúcha Adnet – vocals (track 8)
