= Sam Morrison =

American jazz saxophonist (born 1952)

- Born: 1952 (age 73–74)
- Genres: Jazz fusion
- Occupation: Musician
- Instrument: saxophone
- Years active: 1970s–present

Sam Morrison (b. New York, 1952) is an American jazz saxophonist, flutist, and composer, who replaced Sonny Fortune in Miles Davis's band in 1975. Davis supposedly said, "I haven't heard that much fire on the saxophone since 'Trane was in my band". He is of partly Ukrainian heritage, two of his grandparents having originated in Pereiaslav, near Kyiv.

In 1976, the then 24-year-old saxophonist released Dune for Inner City Records (America) and East Wind Records (Japan). The album features Al Foster and Buster Williams. It was reissued on CD in 2003. Morrison also appears on Foster's 1978 Mixed Roots album.

A second album, Natural Layers (Chiaroscuro Records), followed the next year, featuring Narada Michael Walden.

Morrison, who specializes in the soprano saxophone and alto flute (also playing tenor saxophone and bass flute), has also played with Gil Evans, Woody Shaw, Andrew Cheshire, and Japanese jazz musicians Masabumi Kikuchi, Terumasa Hino and Ryo Kawasaki.

He graduated from Columbia University, where he played in a band with Armen Donelian and Marc Copland.

Morrison lives in Livingston Manor, Sullivan County, New York.
