= Prism (Joanne Brackeen album) =

Studio album by Joanne Brackeen with Eddie Gómez
- Released: 1979
- Recorded: August 1978
- Studio: MacDonald Studio, Sea Cliff, NY
- Genre: Jazz
- Length: 50:43
- Label: Choice; CRS 1024
- Producer: Gerry MacDonald

Joanne Brackeen chronology
Trinkets and Things (1978)	Prism (1979)	Mythical Magic (1978)

Prism is an album by American pianist Joanne Brackeen, recorded in 1978 and released on the Choice label before being rereleased on CD on Candid in 2003.

== Reception ==
Professional ratings
Review scores
Source	Rating
AllMusic	3/5 stars
The Penguin Guide to Jazz Recordings	3/4 stars
The Rolling Stone Jazz Record Guide	4/5 stars

AllMusic reviewer Scott Yanow stated: "Prism is a set of piano-bass duets with Eddie Gómez. As usual for the era, all of the compositions are Brackeen's, and the music is both challenging and spontaneous, at least for musicians skilled enough to master the structures. Although underrated, Brackeen has long been one of the giants of modal post-bop piano, and this fine set serves as additional proof".

== Track listing ==
All compositions by Joanne Brackeen.

1. "International Festival" – 7:05
2. "Lost or Found" – 6:17
3. "Golden Garden" – 8:40
4. "Habitat" – 5:56
5. "If You Dare" – 4:05
6. "Evanescent" – 5:33
7. "Prism" – 5:04
8. "International Festival" [alternate take] – 7:15 Bonus track on CD release

== Personnel ==
- Joanne Brackeen – piano
- Eddie Gómez – bass
