= Mirror of My Mind =

Studio album by Ryo Kawasaki
- Released: 1979
- Recorded: March 1979
- Studio: Power Station, New York City
- Genre: Jazz fusion
- Length: 49:52
- Label: SME
- Producer: Kiyoshi Itoh and Yasohachi Itoh

Mirror of My Mind is an album by Japanese guitarist Ryo Kawasaki that was released in 1979. It was recorded at Power Station Studios in New York City.

== Track listing ==
1. Trinkets & Things (Kawasaki/Shottam) (Ryka/BMI) 6:48
2. I've Found the Way of Love (Kawasaki) (Ryka/BMI) 6:58
3. Dreams for Radha Part I, II & III (Kawasaki) (Ryka/BMI) 7:49
4. Brasiliana (Baden Powell) Gema 4:06
5. Winter's Here (Kawasaki/Shottam) (Ryka/BMI) 4:05
6. In & Out of Love (Kawasaki) (Ryka/BMI) 6:41
7. Little One (Kawasaki) (Ryka/BMI) 4:51

== Personnel ==
- Ryo Kawasaki – electric guitar, acoustic guitar
- Leon Pendarvis – electric piano, arrangement
- Anthony Jackson – bass guitar
- Harvey Mason – drums
- Rubens Bassini – percussion
- Michael Brecker – tenor saxophone
- Radha Shottom (Radha Thomas) – vocals
