= Invitation (Joanne Brackeen album) =

Studio album by Joanne Brackeen Trio
- Released: 1978
- Recorded: July 14, 1976
- Studio: Dureco Studios, Weesp, Holland
- Genre: Jazz
- Length: 50:42
- Label: Freedom; FLP 41044
- Producer: Alan Bates

Joanne Brackeen chronology
Snooze (1975)	Invitation (1978)	New True Illusion (1976)

Invitation is an album by American pianist Joanne Brackeen recorded in 1976 and originally released on the Freedom label before being rereleased as on CD on Black Lion in 1995.

== Reception ==
Professional ratings
Review scores
Source	Rating
AllMusic	4/5 stars

AllMusic reviewer Ken Dryden stated "Joanne Brackeen always keeps the listener guessing with her unpredictable style of playing piano, and this 1976 trio session is no exception".

== Track listing ==
All compositions by Joanne Brackeen except where noted.

1. "Six Ate" – 6:33
2. "Echoes"- 8:57
3. "Invitation" (Bronisław Kaper, Paul Francis Webster) – 8:02
4. "Canyon Lady" (Mark Levine) – 9:58
5. "Iris" (Wayne Shorter) – 6:58
6. "C-Sri" – 8:25

== Personnel ==
- Joanne Brackeen – piano
- Clint Houston – bass
- Billy Hart – drums
