= Tring-a-Ling =

Studio album by Joanne Brackeen
- Released: 1978
- Recorded: March and May 1977
- Studio: MacDonald Studio, Sea Cliff, NY
- Genre: Jazz
- Length: 50:42
- Label: Choice; CRS 1016
- Producer: Gerry MacDonald

Joanne Brackeen chronology
New True Illusion (1976)	Tring-a-Ling (1978)	AFT (1978)

Tring-a-Ling is an album by American pianist Joanne Brackeen recorded in 1977 and released by the Choice label before being rereleased on CD by Candid in 2009.

== Reception ==
Professional ratings
Review scores
Source	Rating
AllMusic	4/5 stars
The Rolling Stone Jazz Record Guide	3/5 stars
DownBeat	4/5 stars

AllMusic reviewer Scott Yanow stated "The pianist's music is complex and quite tricky, but more accessible than expected due to the close interplay between the superb musicians and the variety of rhythms utilized. Open-minded listeners are advised to check this one out".

DownBeat gave 4 stars to the album. The review calls Brackeen, "one helluva pianist, composer and leader".

== Track listing ==
All compositions by Joanne Brackeen.

1. "Shadowbrook-Aire" – 12:12
2. "Fi-Fi's Rock" – 4:38
3. "Echoes" – 9:13
4. "Haiti-B" – 12:42
5. "New True Illusions" – 6:00
6. "Tring-a-Ling" – 6:36
7. "New True Illusions" [alternate take] – 6:10 Bounus track on CD release

== Personnel ==
- Joanne Brackeen – piano
- Michael Brecker – tenor saxophone (tracks 1, 4, 6 & 7)
- Clint Houston (tracks 2, 3 & 5), Cecil McBee (tracks 1, 4, 6 & 7) – bass
- Billy Hart – drums
