= Fi-Fi Goes to Heaven =

Studio album by Joanne Brackeen and Special Friends
- Released: 1987
- Recorded: October 1986
- Studio: RPM Studios, NYC
- Genre: Jazz
- Length: 41:02
- Label: Concord Jazz; CJ-316
- Producer: Joanne Brackeen

Joanne Brackeen chronology
Havin' Fun (1985)	Fi-Fi Goes to Heaven (1987)	Live at Maybeck Recital Hall, Volume 1 (1989)

Fi-Fi Goes to Heaven is an album by American pianist Joanne Brackeen recorded in 1986 and released on the Concord Jazz label.

== Reception ==
Professional ratings
Review scores
Source	Rating
AllMusic	4.5/5 stars

AllMusic reviewer Scott Yanow stated "this very well-rounded outing finds the adventurous pianist Joanne Brackeen splitting the program between four originals and three veteran tunes (including "Stardust"). In addition to bassist Cecil McBee and drummer Al Foster, the CD is quite special, for it matches Brackeen with trumpeter Terence Blanchard and Branford Marsalis (whom she insisted play mostly on his earlier specialty, alto). The young lions work well with Brackeen and her rhythm mates on this consistently stimulating and occasionally playful set. A perfect introduction to Joanne Brackeen's music". The album was selected as one of the 1001 Best Jazz albums for The Penguin Jazz Guide with the authors stating "Brackeen is a superb group player and in Cecil McBee has found a bass-player who perfectly complements her right-biased approach to the keyboard ... The set is also distinguished by Branford Marsalis' appearance on alto, his first instrument but one that has played next to no part in his career. He's very convincing on it, though initially hard to place".

== Track listing ==
All compositions by Joanne Brackeen except where noted.

1. "Estilo Magnifico" – 6:17
2. "Stardust" (Hoagy Carmichael, Mitchell Parish) – 7:56
3. "Fi-Fi Goes to Heaven" – 5:28
4. "Zingaro" (Antônio Carlos Jobim) – 6:52
5. "I Hear a Rhapsody" (George Fragos, Jack Baker, Dick Gasparre) – 5:58
6. "Cosmonaut" – 3:03
7. "Dr. Chang" – 5:28

== Personnel ==
- Joanne Brackeen – piano
- Terence Blanchard – trumpet
- Branford Marsalis – alto saxophone, soprano saxophone
- Cecil McBee – bass
- Al Foster – drums
