= Popsicle Illusion =

Studio album by Joanne Brackeen
- Released: 2000
- Recorded: 2000
- Genre: Jazz
- Length: 72:00
- Label: Arkadia Jazz; 70372
- Producer: Bob Karcy

Joanne Brackeen chronology
Pink Elephant Magic (1998)	Popsicle Illusion (2000)

Popsicle Illusion is a solo album by American pianist Joanne Brackeen which was released on the Arkadia Jazz label.

== Reception ==
Professional ratings
Review scores
Source	Rating
AllMusic	4/5 stars
All About Jazz	4.5/5 stars
The Penguin Guide to Jazz Recordings	3.5/4 stars

AllMusic reviewer David R. Adler called it a "virtuosic solo piano outing" and stated "Popsicle Illusion is packed with Brackeen's characteristic exuberance, sophistication, and diverse stylistic command. ... An important statement from an important pianist.". On All About Jazz, Glenn Astarita noted "Ms. Brackeen embarks on a solo piano recital that features a series of originals and time honored standards as the jazz public receives yet another extraordinary glimpse of this remarkably talented musician ... Popsicle Illusion just reaffirms Joanne Brackeen’s preeminence in the world of modern jazz. In JazzTimes, Larry Appelbaum wrote "Joanne Brackeen is capable of engaging the listener in various ways ... There’s no predicting where Brackeen will take you, but it’s always worth the trip".

== Track listing ==
All compositions by Joanne Brackeen except where noted.

1. "If I Were a Bell" (Frank Loesser) – 5:46
2. "Michelle" (John Lennon, Paul McCartney) – 6:41
3. "Popsicle Illusion" – 4:13
4. "From This Moment On" (Cole Porter) – 6:05
5. "Bess, You Is My Woman Now" (George Gershwin, Ira Gershwin) – 8:22
6. "The Touch of Your Lips" (Ray Noble) – 5:43
7. "Telavivision" – 5:46
8. "Knickerbocker Blues" – 5:31
9. "High Tea for Stephany" – 5:02
10. "Prelude to a Kiss" (Duke Ellington, Irving Gordon, Irving Mills) – 6:17
11. "Nature Boy" (eden ahbez) – 6:30
12. Interview with Joanne – 5:42

== Personnel ==
- Joanne Brackeen – piano
