= Live at Maybeck Recital Hall, Volume 1 =

Live album by Joanne Brackeen
- Released: 1990
- Recorded: June 1989
- Venue: Maybeck Recital Hall, Berkeley, CA
- Genre: Jazz
- Length: 60:35
- Label: Concord Jazz; CCD-4409
- Producer: Nick Phillips

Joanne Brackeen chronology
Fi-Fi Goes to Heaven (1986)	Live at Maybeck Recital Hall, Volume 1 (1990)	Breath of Brazil (1989)

Live at Maybeck Recital Hall, Volume 1 is a solo piano album by American pianist Joanne Brackeen recorded at the Maybeck Recital Hall in 1989 and released on the Concord Jazz label. The album was the first of 42 piano recitals recorded at the hall and released on Concord.

== Reception ==
Professional ratings
Review scores
Source	Rating
AllMusic	4.5/5 stars
The Penguin Guide to Jazz	3.5/4 stars

The Penguin Guide to Jazz noted "Her Maybeck Hall recital turns out to be a significant moment, kicking off a series that has become almost definitive in its coverage of contemporary jazz piano." AllMusic reviewer Scott Yanow stated "She is respectful but passionate on seven standards (keeping the melody in mind during her explorations) while her four originals are given more adventurous improvisations ... Brackeen is clearly a two-handed pianist and, as shown on her "African Aztec," able to play music that hints in an abstract way at earlier styles (in this case blues and boogie-woogie) while remaining quite advanced and original. Well worth checking out".

== Track listing ==
All compositions by Joanne Brackeen except where noted.

1. "Thou Swell" (Richard Rodgers, Lorenz Hart) – 4:34
2. "The Most Beautiful Girl in the World" (Rodgers, Hart) – 5:32
3. "Dr. Chu Chow" – 5:54
4. "Yesterdays" (Jerome Kern, Otto Harbach) – 5:31
5. "Curved Space" – 6:44
6. "It Could Happen to You" (Jimmy Van Heusen, Johnny Burke) – 4:43
7. "African Aztec" – 7:07
8. "My Foolish Heart" (Victor Young, Ned Washington) – 7:13
9. "Calling Carl" – 3:58
10. "I'm Old Fashioned" (Jerome Kern, Johnny Mercer) – 4:59
11. "Strike up the Band" (George Gershwin, Ira Gershwin) – 4:20

== Personnel ==
- Joanne Brackeen – piano
