= Prism (Ryo Kawasaki album) =

Studio album by Ryo Kawasaki
- Released: 1975
- Recorded: July 12, 1975
- Studio: Vanguard Studio, New York City
- Genre: Jazz fusion
- Length: 38:29
- Label: East Wind
- Producer: Kiyoshi Itoh, Yasohachi Itoh

Prism is the first album recorded by Japanese jazz guitarist Ryo Kawasaki after he moved to New York City from Tokyo.

At the time of this recording, he was a member of the Gil Evans Orchestra, Elvin Jones Jazz Machine, Chico Hamilton group, and Tarika Blue. Musicians on this album are from these groups. Herb Bushler was a member of the Gil Evans Orchestra, Abdulha and Steve Turre from the Chico Hamilton group, and Phil Clendeninn from Tarika Blue. Buddy Williams was a member of George Benson's group and often played with Kawasaki in New York City. Prism was recorded in one afternoon and mixed the next day.

== Track listing ==
All tracks are written by Ryo Kawasaki except where noted.

No.	Title	Length
1.	"Agana"	5:47
2.	"Joni"	5:57
3.	"Nogie"	8:48
4.	"Bridge:Sun"	1:02
5.	"Phil" (Phil Clendeninn)	7:29
6.	"Bridge:Moon"	1:20
7.	"Sweet Tears"	7:50
8.	"Bridge:Star – I ain't playn' no guitar, I's jus' playin' with it"	0:16

== Personnel ==
- Ryo Kawasaki – electric guitar
- Phil Clendeninn – Fender Rhodes electric piano, Hohner D6 Clavinet, ARP Odyssey and ARP String Ensemble synthesizers
- Herb Bushler – bass guitar
- Buddy Williams – drums
- Abdulah – congas, percussion
- Steve Turre – shell, percussion
- David Baker – engineer

== Charts ==
Chart performance for Prism
Chart (2024)	Peak position
Croatian International Albums (HDU)	24

== See also ==
- 1975 in Japanese music
