= Turnaround (Joanne Brackeen album) =

Live album by Joanne Brackeen Quartet
- Released: 1995
- Recorded: February 27–28, 1992
- Venue: Sweet Basil, NYC
- Genre: Jazz
- Length: 65:57
- Label: Evidence; ECD 22123-2
- Producer: Joanne Brackeen

Joanne Brackeen chronology
Where Legends Dwell (1991)	Turnaround (1995)	Take a Chance (1993)

Turnaround is a live album by American pianist Joanne Brackeen recorded at Sweet Basil Jazz Club in 1992 and released on the Evidence label in 1995.

== Reception ==
Professional ratings
Review scores
Source	Rating
AllMusic	4/5 stars
The Penguin Guide to Jazz Recordings	3.5/4 stars

AllMusic reviewer Scott Yanow stated "Brackeen is in top form ... The explorative music holds one's interest throughout".

== Track listing ==
All compositions by Joanne Brackeen except where noted.

1. "There Is No Greater Love" (Isham Jones, Marty Symes) – 9:39
2. "Rubies and Diamonds" – 8:57
3. "Picasso" – 16:17
4. "Bewitched, Bothered and Bewildered" (Richard Rodgers, Lorenz Hart) – 9:12
5. "Turnaround" (Ornette Coleman) – 10:27
6. "Tricks of the Trade" – 10:44

== Personnel ==
- Joanne Brackeen – piano
- Donald Harrison – alto saxophone
- Cecil McBee – bass
- Marvin "Smitty" Smith – drums
