= Ancient Dynasty =

Studio album by Joanne Brackeen
- Released: 1980
- Recorded: 1979
- Studio: Sound Mixers, NYC
- Genre: Jazz
- Length: 41:23
- Label: Tappan Zee; JC 36593
- Producer: Bob James and Joe Jorgensen

Joanne Brackeen chronology
Keyed In (1979)	Ancient Dynasty (1980)	Special Identity (1981)

Ancient Dynasty is an album by American pianist Joanne Brackeen recorded in New York City and released on the Tappan Zee label in 1980.

== Reception ==
Professional ratings
Review scores
Source	Rating
AllMusic	2.5/5 stars
The Rolling Stone Jazz Record Guide	4/5 stars

AllMusic reviewer Scott Yanow stated "This now out-of-print album features Brackeen with an all-star quartet featuring her former boss, Joe Henderson, on tenor, bassist Eddie Gomez and drummer Jack DeJohnette. The four complex Brackeen originals are all at least nine minutes long and are quite challenging for both the musicians and the listener alike".

== Track listing ==
All compositions by Joanne Brackeen.

1. "Ancient Dynasty" – 11:16
2. "Remembering" – 10:11
3. "Beagle's Boogie" – 10:38
4. "Pin Drum Song – Celebration" – 9:18

== Personnel ==
- Joanne Brackeen – piano
- Joe Henderson – tenor saxophone
- Eddie Gómez – bass
- Jack DeJohnette – drums
