= Mythical Magic =

Studio album by Joanne Brackeen
- Released: 1979
- Recorded: September 25–26, 1978
- Studio: MPS Studio, Villingen, Schwarzwald, West Germany
- Genre: Jazz
- Label: MPS; 15526
- Producer: Willi Fruth

Joanne Brackeen chronology
| Prism (1978) | Mythical Magic (1979) | Keyed In (1979) |

Mythical Magic is a solo album by pianist Joanne Brackeen recorded in 1978 and released on the German MPS label.

== Reception ==
Professional ratings
Review scores
| Source | Rating |
|---|---|
| AllMusic | 3/5 stars |
| The Rolling Stone Jazz Record Guide | 3/5 stars |

AllMusic reviewer Michael G. Nastos stated "Solo piano. All originals; perky and pungent".

== Track listing ==
All compositions by Joanne Brackeen.

1. "Foreign Ray" – 3:46
2. "Mythical Magic" – 7:46
3. "Hobbits" – 4:13
4. "Told You So" – 4:02
5. "Phantom's Forum" – 4:30
6. "Transition" – 4:00
7. "Of Gnomes in Dance" – 5:36
8. "Now or Never" – 4:39
9. "Minuend" – 3:07

== Personnel ==
- Joanne Brackeen – piano
