= AFT (album) =

Studio album by Joanne Brackeen
- Released: 1978
- Recorded: December 30, 1977
- Studio: CI Studio, NYC
- Genre: Jazz
- Length: 41:22
- Label: Timeless; SJP 115
- Producer: Wim Wigt

Joanne Brackeen chronology
Tring-a-Ling (1977)	AFT (1978)	Trinkets and Things (1978)

AFT is an album by pianist Joanne Brackeen, recorded in late 1977 and released on the Dutch Timeless label.

== Reception ==
Professional ratings
Review scores
Source	Rating
AllMusic	3/5 stars
The Penguin Guide to Jazz	3/4 stars
The Rolling Stone Jazz Record Guide	3/5 stars
DownBeat	4/5 stars

AllMusic reviewer Scott Yanow stated:

Brackeen long ago developed her own distinctive chord voicings and, even when one hears touches of McCoy Tyner or Chick Corea in her solos, in reality she sounds like no one else. Her close interplay with Kawasaki and Houston on the six group originals (four by Brackeen) is consistently impressive and unpredictable.

== Track listing ==
All compositions by Joanne Brackeen except where noted.

1. "Haiti B" – 7:35
2. "Charlotte's Dream" (Clint Houston) – 5:04
3. "Dreamers" – 5:31
4. "AFT" – 6:28
5. "Winter Is Here" (Ryo Kawasaki) – 7:31
6. "Green Voices of Play Air" – 9:09

== Personnel ==
- Joanne Brackeen – piano
- Ryo Kawasaki – guitar
- Clint Houston – bass
