= Joanne Brackeen =

American jazz pianist and music educator

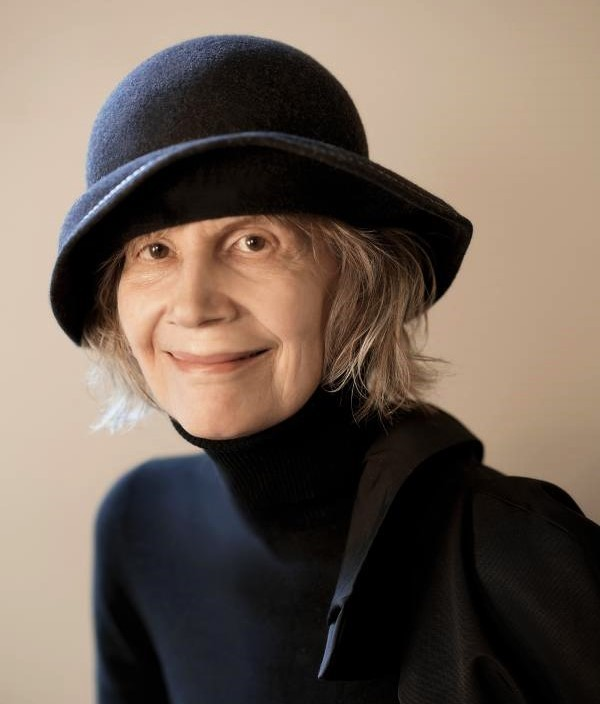

Background information
- Born: Joanne Grogan; July 26, 1938 (age 87); Ventura, California, U.S.
- Genres: Jazz
- Occupations: Musician, educator
- Instrument: Piano
- Years active: 1969–present
- Website: joannebrackeenjazz.com

Joanne Brackeen (born Joanne Grogan; July 26, 1938) is an American jazz pianist and music educator.

== Music career ==
Brackeen was born in Ventura, California, United States, and attended the Los Angeles Conservatory of Music. She was a fan of pop pianist Frankie Carle before she became enamored of the music of Charlie Parker. In the 1950s she performed with Dexter Gordon, Teddy Edwards, and Charles Brackeen. She and Brackeen married and moved to New York City in 1965. She performed with Chick Corea, Freddie McCoy, and Ornette Coleman. She was also the only woman hired to perform with Art Blakey and the Jazz Messengers.

She played with Joe Henderson (1972–75) and Stan Getz (1975–77) before leading her own trio and quartet. She established herself as a cutting-edge pianist and composer through her appearances around the world, and her solo performances also established her reputation as an innovative and dynamic pianist. Her trios have featured noted players such as Clint Houston, Eddie Gómez, John Patitucci, Jack DeJohnette, Cecil McBee and Billy Hart.

She served on the grant panel for the National Endowment for the Arts, toured the Middle East with the US State Department as sponsor, and had solo performances at Carnegie Hall.

She has recorded over 20 albums as a lead musician. She is a professor at the Berklee College of Music and at The New School.

== Awards ==
- 2018 NEA Jazz Masters

== Discography ==
=== As leader ===
Year recorded	Title	Label	Personnel/Notes
1975	Snooze	Choice	Trio, with Cecil McBee (bass), Billy Hart (drums); also released as Six Ate by Candid
1976	Invitation	Freedom	Trio, with Clint Houston (bass), Billy Hart (drums)
1976	New True Illusion	Timeless	Duo, with Clint Houston (bass)
1977	Tring-a-Ling	Choice	Some tracks trio, with Clint Houston (bass), Billy Hart (drums); some tracks quartet, with Michael Brecker (tenor sax), Cecil McBee (bass), Hart (drums)
1977	AFT	Timeless	Trio, with Ryo Kawasaki (guitar), Clint Houston (bass)
1978	Trinkets and Things	Timeless	Duo, with Ryo Kawasaki (guitar)
1978	Prism	Choice	Duo, with Eddie Gómez (bass)
1978	Mythical Magic	MPS	Solo piano
1979	Keyed In	Tappan Zee/Columbia	Trio, with Eddie Gómez (bass), Jack DeJohnette (drums)
1980	Ancient Dynasty	Tappan Zee/Columbia	Quartet, with Joe Henderson (tenor sax), Eddie Gómez (bass), Jack DeJohnette (drums)
1981	Special Identity	Antilles	Trio, with Eddie Gómez (bass), Jack DeJohnette (drums)
1985	Havin' Fun	Concord Jazz	Trio, with Cecil McBee (bass), Al Foster (drums)
1986	Fi-Fi Goes to Heaven	Concord Jazz	With Terence Blanchard (trumpet), Branford Marsalis (alto sax, soprano sax), Cecil McBee (bass), Al Foster (drums)
1989	Live at Maybeck Recital Hall, Volume 1	Concord Jazz	Solo piano
1991	Breath of Brazil	Concord Jazz	Quartet, with Eddie Gómez (bass), Duduka da Fonseca (drums), Waltinho Anastácio (percussion)
1991	Is It Really True	Konnex	Trio, with Walter Schmocker (bass), Billy Hart (drums)
1991	Where Legends Dwell	Ken	Trio, with Eddie Gómez (bass), Jack DeJohnette (drums)
1992	Turnaround	Evidence	Quartet, with Donald Harrison (alto sax), Cecil McBee (bass), Marvin "Smitty" Smith (drums)
1993	Take a Chance	Concord Jazz	Quartet, with Eddie Gómez (bass), Duduka da Fonseca (drums), Waltinho Anastácio (percussion, vocals)
1994	Power Talk	Turnipseed	Trio, with Ira Coleman (bass), Tony Reedus (drums); in concert
1999	Pink Elephant Magic	Arkadia Jazz	One track solo piano; some tracks trio, with John Patitucci (bass), Horacio "El Negro" Hernandez (drums); some tracks quartet, with Chris Potter (soprano sax) added; some tracks quintet, with Nicholas Payton (trumpet) added; one track sextet, with Jamey Haddad (percussion) added; one track quartet with Patitucci (bass), Hernandez (drums), Dave Liebman (soprano sax); one track quintet with Kurt Elling (vocals) added
2000	Popsicle Illusion	Arkadia Jazz	Solo piano

=== As sideperson ===
With Arkadia Jazz All Stars

- Thank You, Duke!

With Art Blakey

- Jazz Messengers '70 (Catalyst, 1970)

With Toots Thielemans

- Captured Alive (Choice/Candid, 1974)

With Stan Getz

- Getz/Gilberto '76 (Resonance, 1976 [2016]) with João Gilberto
- Live at Montmartre (SteepleChase, 1977)

With Bob James

- All Around The Town (Tappan Zee/Columbia, 1981)

With Freddie McCoy

- Funk Drops (Prestige, 1966)
- Peas 'n' Rice (Prestige, 1967)
- Beans & Greens (Prestige, 1967)
- Soul Yogi (Prestige, 1968)

With Makanda Ken McIntyre

- A New Beginning (Passin' Thru, 2001)

With Buddy Terry

- Pure Dynamite (Mainstream, 1972)

With Freddie Hubbard

- Sweet Return (Atlantic, 1983)
