= Ryo Kawasaki =

Japanese jazz guitarist (1947–2020)

Ryo Kawasaki 川崎 燎
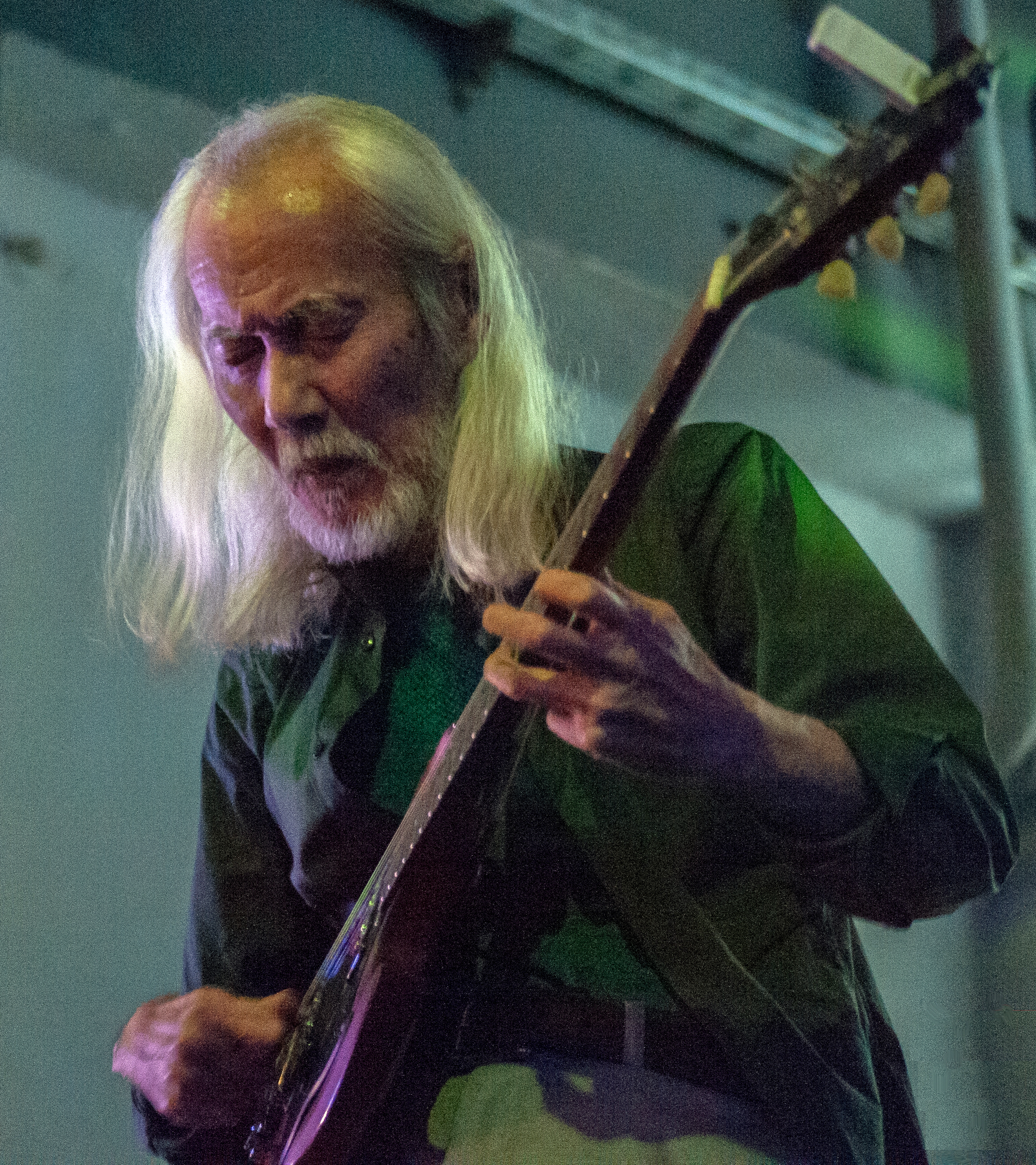
- Ryo Kawasaki performing at The Garden Brewery, Zagreb Croatia Dec 15, 2018 — photography by Luka Antunac

Background information
- Born: February 25, 1947; Kōenji, Tokyo, Japan
- Died: April 13, 2020 (aged 73) Tallinn, Estonia
- Genres: Jazz fusion
- Occupations: Musician; composer; audio engineer; software programmer
- Instruments: Guitar; keyboards
- Years active: 1967–2020
- Website: RyoKawasaki.com

Ryo Kawasaki (川崎 燎, Kawasaki Ryō; February 25, 1947 – April 13, 2020) was a Japanese jazz fusion guitarist, composer and band leader, best known as one of the first musicians to develop and popularise the fusion genre and for helping to develop the guitar synthesizer in collaboration with Roland Corporation and Korg. His album Ryo Kawasaki and the Golden Dragon Live was one of the first all-digital recordings and he created the Kawasaki Synthesizer for the Commodore 64. During the 1960s, he played with various Japanese jazz groups and also formed his own bands. In the early 1970s, he moved to New York City, where he settled and worked with Gil Evans, Elvin Jones, Chico Hamilton, Ted Curson, Joanne Brackeen amongst others. In the mid-1980s, Kawasaki drifted out of performing music in favour of writing music software for computers. He also produced several techno dance singles, formed his own record company called Satellites Records, and later returned to jazz-fusion in 1991.

== Life ==
=== Early life (1947–1968) ===
Ryo Kawasaki was born on February 25, 1947, in Kōenji, Tokyo, while Japan was still struggling and recovering from the early post World War II period. His father, Torao Kawasaki, was a Japanese diplomat who had worked for The Japanese Ministry of Foreign Affairs since 1919. Torao worked at several Japanese consulates and embassies, including San Francisco, Honolulu, Fengtian (then capital of Manchuria, now Shenyang in China), Shanghai, and Beijing while active as an English teacher and translator for official diplomatic conferences. Ryo's mother, Hiroko, was also multilingual, and spoke German, Russian, English, and Chinese aside from her native tongue Japanese. Hiroko grew up in Manchuria and then met Torao in Shanghai. Torao was already 58 years old when Ryo was born as an only child.

Kawasaki's mother encouraged him to take piano and ballet lessons, and he took voice lessons and solfege at age four and violin lessons at five, and he was reading music before elementary school. As a grade scholar, he began a lifelong fascination with astronomy and electronics (he built his own radios, TVs and audio systems including amplifiers and speakers as well as telescopes). When Ryo was 10, he bought a ukulele and, at 14, he got his first acoustic guitar. The album Midnight Blue by Kenny Burrell and Stanley Turrentine inspired Ryo to study jazz.

In high school, he began hanging out at coffee-houses that featured live music, formed a jazz ensemble and built an electronic organ that served as a primitive synthesizer. By the time he was 16, his band was playing professionally in cabarets and strip joints. Although he continued to play music regularly, he attended Nippon University, majored in physics and earned his Bachelor of Science Degree. He also did some teaching and contest judging at the Yamaha musical instrument manufacturer's jazz school. Additionally, he worked as a sound engineer for Japanese Victor Records and BGM/TBS Music, where he learned mixing and editing.

=== Early career in Japan (1969–1973) ===
He recorded his first solo album for Polydor Records when he was 22. Although he continued to perform with his jazz group, and at a young age was voted the No. 3 jazz guitarist in a Japanese jazz poll, Kawasaki spent most of the next three years working as studio musician on everything from advertising jingles to pop songs including countless radio and TV appearances. He recorded his second album for Toshiba when he was 24. He played with B.B. King at a blues festival and also met George Benson (they jammed for five hours at Kawasaki's house).

He also has recorded and worked with notable Japanese jazz musicians such as drummer Takeshi Inomata and Sound limits, saxophonist Jiro Inagaki and His Soul Media, saxophonist Keiichiro Ebisawa, saxophonist Seiichi Nakamura, pianist Masahiko Sato (佐藤允彦), saxophonist Hidehiko Matsumoto (松本英彦) and many others.

=== Developments in New York City (1973–2002) ===
==== 1973–1979 (as guitarist) ====
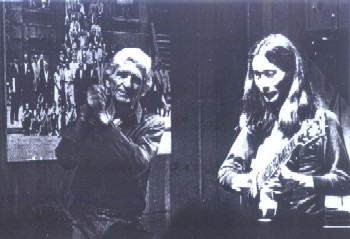
Ryo Kawasaki with Gil Evans at Sweet Basil in New York City, 1982

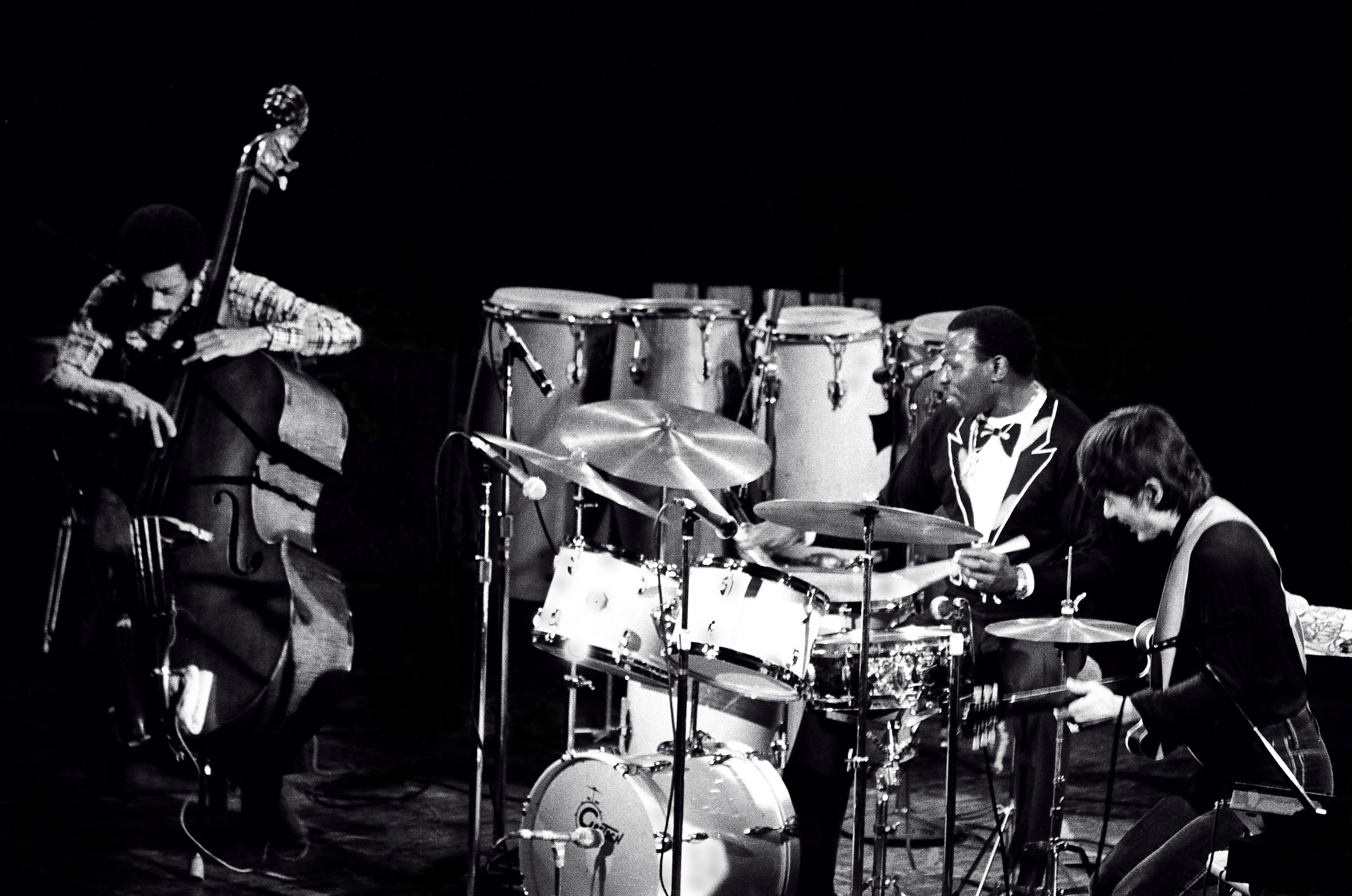
David Williams, Elvin Jones and Kawasaki in Rochester, N.Y. 1976

In 1973, Kawasaki arrived in New York. A friend picked him up at the airport and offered him an immediate gig with Joe Lee Wilson playing at the Lincoln Center as part of the Newport Jazz Festival. Soon Kawasaki was jamming regularly as part of the jazz community's "loft scene", and was invited to play with Bobbi Humphrey. A few months later, Kawasaki walked up to his apartment and found a stranger waiting for him at his front door. It was Gil Evans and he invited Kawasaki to join The Gil Evans Orchestra (David Sanborn, Howard Johnson, Tom Malone, Lew Soloff) which was then working on a jazz recording of Jimi Hendrix compositions, The Gil Evans Orchestra Plays the Music of Jimi Hendrix. Hendrix had dreamed up the concept with Evans, but Jimi died a week before the project started in 1970. Kawasaki also played on another Gil Evans album on RCA, There Comes a Time, with Tony Williams on drums. Kawasaki rehearsed for a month with the third edition of Tony Williams' Lifetime with trio format with bassist Doug Rauch working with Carlos Santana at that time, but Tony left to spend a year in Europe before the band got the chance to perform in public.

Kawasaki followed in the footsteps of Jim Hall, Gábor Szabó and Larry Coryell by becoming the guitarist in the Chico Hamilton Band, playing on a U.S. tour and working on various film scores that Chico recorded in Hollywood. Kawasaki made his debut U.S. album, Juice, in 1976 for RCA and was one of the first Japanese jazz artists to sign with a major label in the States. Sidemen on the project included Tom Coster (Carlos Santana) and Sam Morrison (Miles Davis). Kawasaki followed that recording with two more albums, Prism and Eight Mile Road, for the Japanese label East Wind. He also joined the Elvin Jones Band for a year-long tour of North and South America and Europe. By 1978, Kawasaki was tired of touring with other bands and returned to his own projects.

He explored Music of India, learned ragas and recorded an Audio Fidelity album, Ring Toss, that combined eastern and western music. With Dave Liebman he recorded Nature's Revenge for the German MPS label and they toured Europe. Ryo also toured European jazz festivals with Joanne Brackeen as piano – guitar duo, and they recorded a pair of albums—AFT and Trinkets and Things—for Timeless Records in the Netherlands. In Japan, Sony's Open Sky label signed Ryo for three albums—Mirror of my Mind, Little Tree and Live—the latter, recorded in a Tokyo club, was one of the first all-digital recordings. Notable musicians who participated on those recordings include Michael Brecker, Harvey Mason, Leon Pendarvis, Azar Lawrence, Anthony Jackson, Lincoln Goines, Barbara Morillo aka Ilana, Badal Roy, Nana Vasconcelos, Buddy Williams, Larry Willis, and Alex Blake. He also recorded an album called Sapporo for the Swiss label America Sound in 1980 while touring Switzerland and Germany.

==== 1979–1990 (as inventor and programmer) ====
Kawasaki invented his own guitar synthesizer in 1979, and used it to perform numerous solo shows at planetariums from 1980 to 1983. He also formed the jazz-rock group The Golden Dragon and performed concerts regularly in early 1980s. Fostex developed the first quarter- inch-tape, eight-track recorder called A8 along with 2 track mastering machine A2 and asked Kawasaki to be the first artist to use it. He recorded the album Ryo in 1981 for Philips Records and gained notoriety for creating all the music himself. He played only a nylon-string acoustic guitar with all his backing tracks created on his guitar synthesizer including the entire original orchestration of Joaquin Rodrigo's well known Concierto de Aranjuez – Adagio movement. He did another similar recording, Lucky Lady, the next year.

When the Commodore 64 computer came out and was the first computer with a music synthesizer chip built-in (as opposed to a more common sound chip), Kawasaki became fascinated by the possibilities. He learned to write computer programs and devoted 16 hours a day for two years creating four music software programs—Kawasaki Synthesizer, Kawasaki Rhythm Rocker, Kawasaki Magical Musicquill, and Kawasaki MIDI Workstation—distributed by Sight and Sound Music. The first three programs were for school and home use, and the last one was for professional studios. He created an all-synthesized album, Images, in 1987; and the soundtrack, Pleasure Garden, in 1990, for an IMAX film about the preservation of the Earth's endangered tropical rain forests.

From 1986 to 1990, Kawasaki produced a series of high-charting 12 inch dance singles—"Electric World", "One Kiss", "No Expectations", "Say Baby I Love You", "Don't Tell Me", "Wildest Dreams", "Life is The Rhythm", "Pleasure Garden", and "Acid Heat"—that mixed free-style, house, acid house and ambient sounds. All of the production was done at his home studio, The Satellite Station, and the records were released on his own label, Satellites Records. His band and a dance troupe (organized by the band's lead singer - Barbara 'Ilana' Morillo) also performed extensively in New York dance clubs. In addition, for five years (1988 to 1993), Kawasaki was the New York producer and director of two Japanese national weekly music radio programs, The Music Now and Idex Music Jam. He also collaborated with Japanese koto master Kicho Takano and produced "Crystallization" in 1986.

==== 1991–2000 (return to jazz guitarist) ====
Kawasaki's musical direction took another dramatic turn when he was signed by the new jazz and adult contemporary Japanese label One Voice as an artist and record producer. Kawasaki's return to jazz, and his first album for the label, was the 1992 acoustic solo guitar album Here, There and Everywhere (released on One Voice in Japan and on Satellites Records in the U.S.). Kawasaki has produced and performed on three albums by Brazilian singer and guitarist Camila Benson for this label. Ryo has continued to release a steady string of albums—the acoustic My Reverie (music from Bill Evans, Debussy, Ravel and Gershwin), the electric jazz guitar-oriented Love Within The Universe (which received considerable airplay across the country), "Remixes Remixes Vol. 1" (also featuring Benson), "Sweet Life" and CD releases of "Mirror of my Mind" (a jazz ensemble recording with Harvey Mason, Michael Brecker, Anthony Jackson, Leon Pendarvis and vocalist Radha Shottam).

His 1999 release Cosmic Rhythm features British singer lyricist Clare Foster along with Kawasaki's rhythm section Victor Jones on drums, Lincoln Goines on bass. The album also features David Kikoski on piano and Shunzo Ohno on flugelhorn. All the songs were arranged and recorded by Kawasaki including original ten songs by Ryo himself.

During 1995–1999, three hip hop artists, Puff Daddy, Kool G Rap, and Keith Murray, recorded Kawasaki's original composition "Bamboo Child" on their latest albums more than twenty years after its original recording.

=== Developments in Estonia and beyond (2000–2020) ===
In 2001, Kawasaki released the live studio album Reval, recorded in Tallinn, Estonia with Estonian musicians Toivo Unt on bass, Aivar Vassiljev on drums, and Kristi Keel on English horn.

His other projects include being a composer, music director as well as a guitarist for the jazz ballet "Still Point" for the Estonian National Opera House during 2000-2002. This ballet is choreographed by Russell Adamson, a native Jamaican who resides in Helsinki.

Kawasaki released his third acoustic guitar solo album E in 2002.

From the year 2000 onwards, Kawasaki further expanded his live appearances into Russia and Baltic region jazz festivals. His quartet has appeared at Rigas Ritmi Jazz Festival in Riga/Latvia, Pori and other jazz festivals in Finland, Ukraine, Lithuania, and Saransk Jazz Ark Festival. He also appeared numerous times at Nõmme Jazz Festival in Estonia while assisting the production of this jazz festival.

Kawasaki's projects during 2005–2008 included guitar trio project with American drummer Brian Melvin and Estonian bassist Toivo Unt under the "Art of Trio" name, performing in a variety of venues in Finland, Sweden, and the Baltic states, and performing with Estonian vocalist Jaanika Ventsel, while also touring and recording in Japan for the duo project with bassist Yoshio 'Chin' Suzuki (鈴木良雄), their duo CD "Agana" was released in February 2007.

In 2008, Kawasaki formed jazz ensemble with Estonian pianist/keyboardist Tõnu Naissoo. Also, his second duo CD with Yoshio 'Chin' Suzuki (鈴木良雄) and first CD with "Art of Trio" were completed and released during 2009, while his composition "Raisins" was included on the Grand Theft Auto IV radio station Fusion FM in 2008.

From 2009–2011, Kawasaki further expanded his performing activities in Lebanon with Syrian bassist, Omar Harb and Lebanese drummer, Fouad Afra. The album Live in Beirut which Kawasaki recorded with Lebanese organist, Arthur Satyan and drummer, Fouad Afra was released in 2011.

Overlapping the same time period, beginning in 2007, Kawasaki gradually developed his fourth acoustic guitar solo album Spain in Tallinn, Estonia, which was finally released in 2012.

In 2014, Kawasaki discovered a younger generation of Estonian musicians who inspired him to further develop a fusion, jazz-rock sound using his own compositions. His attention on these directions had somewhat faded away after recording in the early 1980s with his group Golden Dragon. In spring 2016, Kawasaki formed a new quartet called Level 8, exclusively with Estonian musicians: Raun Juurikas (keyboards), Kaarel Liiv (electric bass) and Eno Kollom (drums). Level 8 finished recording a self-titled album focusing on Kawasaki's compositions both from the past and present utilizing a funk/fusion/jazz-rock sound. The album Level 8 was released in March 2017.

In April 2016, UK independent label Nunorthernsoul released a vinyl EP titled Selected Works 1979 to 1983 by Ryo Kawasaki. A follow-up vinyl EP titled Selected Works Part 2 - 1976 to 1980 by Ryo Kawasaki was released in April 2017.

Kawasaki died in Tallinn, Estonia in April 2020 at the age of 73.

== Discography ==
=== As leader ===
- Prism (East Wind, 1976)
- Juice (RCA, 1976)
- Ring Toss (Chiaroscuro, 1977)
- Eight Mile Road (East Wind, 1978)
- Nature's Revenge (MPS, 1978)
- Mirror of My Mind (Satellites, 1979)
- Little Tree (1980)
- Live (Openskye, 1980)
- Featuring Concierto De Aranjuez (Philips, 1982)
- Lucky Lady (Continental, 1983)
- Images (Ryka, 1987)
- My Reverie (Videoarts, 1993)
- Remixes Remixes Vol. 1 (One Voice/Satellites, 1994)
- Love within the Universe (Videoarts, 1994)
- Plays Solo Guitar Here There and Everywhere (Videoarts, 1995)
- Sweet Life (Videoarts, 1996)
- Cosmic Rhythm (One Voice, 1999)
- Agana with Yoshio Chin Suzuki (DIW, 2007)
- Late Night Willie with Yoshio Chin Suzuki (Studio Songs 2009)
- Live in Beirut 2011 (Studio Songs, 2011)
- Plays Solo Guitar: Spain (Studio Songs, 2012)
- Level 8 (Vivid Sound, 2017)
- Giant Steps (Studio Songs, 2019)
- Level 8 Live (Studio Songs, 2019)

=== As sideman ===
- Gato Barbieri, Bahia (Fania, 1982)
- Joanne Brackeen, Trinkets and Things (Timeless, 1978)
- Joanne Brackeen, AFT (Timeless, 1978)
- John Clark, I Will (Postcards, 1997)
- Ted Curson, I Heard Mingus (Trio 1980)
- Gil Evans, The Gil Evans Orchestra Plays the Music of Jimi Hendrix (RCA, Victor 1974)
- Gil Evans, There Comes a Time (RCA, 1976)
- Clint Houston, Inside the Plain of the Elliptic (Timeless, 1979)
- Takeshi Inomata, Sounds of Sound L.T.D. (Columbia, 1970)
- Elvin Jones, The Main Force (Vanguard, 1976)
- Elvin Jones, Time Capsule (Vanguard, 1977)
- Teo Macero, Impressions of Charles Mingus (Palo Alto 1983)
- Teo Macero, Fusion (Europa, 1984)
- Teo Macero, Acoustical Suspension (Doctor Jazz 1985)
- Steve Marcus & Jiro Inagaki, Something (Columbia, 1971)
- Sam Morrison, Dune (East Wind, 1977)
- Shigeharu Mukai, Pleasure (Better Days 1980)
- Minoru Muraoka, Osorezan Suite (Yupiteru, 1978)
- Masahiko Satoh, All-in All-Out (Openskye, 1979)
- Masahiko Satoh, Bridge Over Troubled Water (Columbia, 2007)
- Cedar Walton, Mobius (RCA, 1975)
- Joe Lee Wilson, What Would It Be Without You (Survival, 1976)

== Software ==
- Kawasaki Synthesizer (1984)
- Kawasaki Rhythm Rocker (1984)
- Kawasaki Magical Musicquill (1985)
- Kawasaki MIDI Workstation (1986)

== Video and film ==
- Different Drummer with Elvin Jones (1979)
- Jazz in Exile Documentary (1982)
