= Clint Houston =

American jazz double bassist (1946–2000)

Clinton Joseph Houston (June 24, 1946 – June 7, 2000) was an American jazz double-bassist.

Houston played with George Cables and Lenny White in the house band at Slug's, a club in New York City, then played with Nina Simone (1969), Roy Haynes (1969–70), Sonny Greenwich and Don Thompson (1970), Roy Ayers (1971–73), Charles Tolliver (1973–75), Stan Getz (1972–77), and Woody Shaw (1977–79). In 1972 he began collaborating with Joanne Brackeen, working with her through 1986; he also played with Pepper Adams (1983), Slide Hampton (1981), Frank Foster (1984–86), and Roland Hanna (1986).

== Career ==
Clint Houston was born in New Orleans, and spent his early childhood in Washington, D.C. before spending his adolescence in Queens, New York. At the age of 10, he began piano lessons. He started playing jazz in his early teens after hearing Cannonball Adderley on the radio. After being turned down for a pianist role in his high school band, Houston switched to the double bass. Houston began playing in bands outside of high school, with Lenny White, George Cables, Billy Cobham, Steve Grossman and Charles Sullivan, all of whom grew up in the same neighborhood. In his early years, he played in a band called the Jazz Samaritans, playing Latin-style music at local parties and drawing inspiration from Art Blakey. At the age of 19, Clint Houston won a Jazz Interactions competition, leading to an encounter with Paul Chambers who encouraged him to pursue his music further.

After high school, Houston's parents encouraged him to attend the Pratt Institute to study architecture, but he transferred to Queens College to study music before eventually obtaining a degree in Graphic Art from Cooper Union. During his higher education, Houston spent his weekends playing alongside Cables and White at Slugs' matinées. Their playing impressed the various bandleaders who performed at the club and the three of them began working more extensively with better-known artists. Houston was a founding member of musical co-operative Free Life Communications, alongside Dave Liebman, becoming more immersed in the loft jazz scene of 1970s New York.

By 1975, Clint Houston was playing alongside Joanne Brackeen in Stan Getz' band. Their combined efforts provided a supportive and flexible framework during his live performances. According to journalist Ted Panken:

"Stan explained to me quite a few times backstage at Keystone Korner that ‘I have never felt as free and as totally supported as I do with this band with Joanne Brackeen, Clint Houston, and Billy Hart. They are happy and free to go with me wherever I go.'”

Houston and Brackeen's collaborations continued, playing in clubs such as the Surf Maid on Bleecker Street in New York, and appearing in many of Brackeen's early records.

== Instruments and playing style ==
During his time with Roy Ayers, Clint Houston played both electric bass and upright bass, but found that he was increasingly being asked to play electric, to his frustration. He played a clear-bodied Plexiglas electric bass, and 'Gertrude', his Czechoslovak double bass built in 1940. He found this bass for sale in a recording studio. Houston also learned how to play acoustic guitar, and played it on his album Inside the Plain of the Elliptic (1979) on the title track and on "Geri".

Houston preferred an upright bass with the E and A strings set higher above the fingerboard, for greater resonance, with the G and D strings having a lower action to aid fast-tempo playing. By 1978, Houston was using Barcus-Berry and Polytone pickups on his double bass. Houston favored a combination of the German and Italian-style finger positions in his left hand, teaching this hybrid style to his private students.

Houston's bass solos are characterized by rapid, fluid playing. In an interview with Down Beat magazine, he stressed:

"What I'm really looking for in this instrument and through my kind of bass playing is texture. My notes are very definitely selected, because they have to go through the changes, but there's a texture I hear. It's like if you play fast enough, you can almost play single notes like a chord. If you play an arpeggio on the piano fast enough, it's like you just hit the chord, and sometimes you can just about get it on the bass - at the proper tempo."

Long-time collaborator Joanne Brackeen said of his playing:

"Clint played a little different from everybody else, and he really liked to solo. He played a solo more like a horn player than like a bass player, but it had a certain rhythm [...] that was what he loved to do, that was his thing. Yeah, no motive other than that."

== Personal life ==
Clint Houston, who had at least one daughter, was divorced. His wife Gerry Houston, who died in 2009, worked the door at the Village Vanguard and was known for her 'dry, caustic sense of humor' which was useful for dealing with customers at the club. In 2010, JazzTimes dedicated a series of columns profiling 'people behind the scenes' at New York's jazz clubs to her memory.

== Discography ==
=== As leader ===
- Watership Down (Storyville, 1978) with John Abercrombie, Joanne Brackeen, Onaje Allan Gumbs, Al Foster
- Inside the Plain of the Elliptic (Timeless, 1979) with Rubens Bassini, Ryo Kawasaki, Joanne Brackeen

=== As sideman ===
With Pepper Adams

- Conjuration: Fat Tuesday's Session (Reservoir, 1983 [1990])

With Joseph Bonner

- Triangle (Whynot, 1975)

With Joanne Brackeen

- Invitation (Freedom, 1976 [1978])
- New True Illusion (Timeless, 1976)
- Tring-a-Ling (Choice, 1977)
- AFT (Timeless, 1978)

With Marc Copland

- Friends (Oblivion, 1973)

With Stan Getz

- The Master (Columbia, 1975 [1982])
- Getz/Gilberto '76 (Resonance, 1976 [2016]) with João Gilberto
- Moments in Time (Resonance, 1976 [2016]) with Joanne Brackeen, Billy Hart

With Sonny Greenwich

- The Old Man and the Child (Sackville, 1970)

With Louis Hayes

- Light and Lively (SteepleChase, 1989)
- The Crawl (Candid, 1989)
- Una Max (SteepleChase, 1989)
- Nightfall (SteepleChase, 1991)
- Blue Lou (SteepleChase, 1993)

With John Hicks

- Hells Bells (Strata-East, 1980 [1998])

With Terumasa Hino

- Hip Seagull (Flying Disk,1978)

With Azar Lawrence

- Bridge into the New Age (Prestige, 1974)

With John Scofield

- East Meets West (1977)

With Woody Shaw

- Blackstone Legacy (Contemporary, 1970)
- Rosewood (Columbia, 1977)
- Stepping Stones: Live at the Village Vanguard (Columbia, 1978)
- Woody III (Columbia, 1979)

With Nina Simone

- The Soul of Nina Simone (RCA, 2005)

With Charles Tolliver

- Live in Tokyo (Strata-East, 1973)
- Impact (Strata-East, 1975)
- Live at the Captain’s Cabin (Reel To Real, 2024)
  With Henny Vonk
- Rerootin' (1982)
