= Keyed In =

Studio album by Joanne Brackeen
- Released: 1979
- Recorded: 1979
- Studios: Power Station, New York City
- Genre: Jazz
- Length: 38:37
- Labels: Tappan Zee; 83868
- Producers: Bob James, Joe Jorgensen

Joanne Brackeen chronology
Mythical Magic (1978)	Keyed In (1979)	Ancient Dynasty (1979)

Keyed In is an album by American pianist Joanne Brackeen. It was recorded in 1979 and released on the Tappan Zee label.

== Reception ==
Professional ratings
Review scores
Source	Rating
AllMusic	4/5 stars
DownBeat	4/5 stars

In 1999, The New York Times called Keyed In "a vibrant collection of originals," writing that it "ranks among the most impressive piano trio albums of the past quarter-century." Jazziz wrote that "it showcases Brackeen's more melodic side ... and yet, with uncanny dexterity, she pushes outward as she stays inside—most of the time."

AllMusic reviewer Scott Yanow stated: "Teamed up with bassist Eddie Gomez and drummer Jack DeJohnette, Brackeen sounds quite distinctive on seven of her originals, hinting a little at McCoy Tyner but coming up with fresh and advanced improvisations". Doug Payne stated: "This is an amazingly good record from start to finish and the epitome of the jazz piano trio of the 1970s. Outside of Bill Evans, hardly anyone was making music like this at the time and Ms. Brackeen's command of the unit is simply mind boggling. She is a democratic leader overflowing with more ideas than can possibly be captured well in one album and Gomez and DeJohnette are superb associates, leading as much as following".

== Track listing ==
All compositions by Joanne Brackeen.

1. "Let Me Know" – 5:06
2. "El Mayorazgo" – 6:39
3. "Off Glimpse" – 7:17
4. "Twin Dreams" – 5:41
5. "Again and Always" – 5:50
6. "Carmel Tea" – 6:01
7. "The Grant" – 2:03

== Personnel ==
- Joanne Brackeen – piano
- Eddie Gómez – bass
- Jack DeJohnette – drums
