= Snooze (album) =

Studio album by Joanne Brackeen
- Released: 1975
- Recorded: 1975
- Genre: Jazz
- Length: 50:42
- Label: Choice; CRS 1009

Joanne Brackeen chronology
Snooze (1975)	Invitation (1976)

Snooze is an album by American pianist Joanne Brackeen recorded in 1975 and released on the Choice label before being rereleased as Six Ate on CD on Candid in 1996.

== Reception ==
Professional ratings
Review scores
Source	Rating
AllMusic	4/5 stars
The Rolling Stone Jazz Record Guide	4/5 stars
The Penguin Guide to Jazz Recordings	3/4 stars

AllMusic reviewer Scott Yanow stated "Pianist Joanne Brackeen's debut album (after a barely documented period with Art Blakey's Jazz Messengers) is a very impressive effort. ... Her chord voicings are thick and sometimes quite dense, but this music is strangely accessible".

== Track listing ==
All compositions by Joanne Brackeen except where noted.

1. "Nefertiti" (Wayne Shorter) – 7:56
2. "Circles" (Miles Davis) – 7:19
3. "C-Sri" – 6:07
4. "Zulu" – 4:46
5. "Sixate" – 4:49
6. "Old Devil Moon" (Burton Lane, Yip Harburg) – 6:48
7. "Snooze" – 6:24
8. "I Didn't Know What Time It Was" (Richard Rodgers, Lorenz Hart) – 6:46 Bounus track on CD release

== Personnel ==
- Joanne Brackeen – piano
- Cecil McBee – bass
- Billy Hart – drums
