= Where Legends Dwell =

Studio album by Joanne Brackeen
- Released: 1992
- Recorded: September 3–4, 1991
- Studio: Giant Sound, NYC
- Genre: Jazz
- Length: 70:27
- Label: Ken Music; KEN-021
- Producer: Helen Keane

Joanne Brackeen chronology
Is It Really True (1991)	Where Legends Dwell (1992)	Turnaround (1992)

Where Legends Dwell is an album by American pianist Joanne Brackeen recorded in 1991 and released on the Ken Music label.

== Reception ==
Professional ratings
Review scores
Source	Rating
AllMusic	4/5 stars
The Penguin Guide to Jazz	4/4 stars

The Penguin Guide to Jazz noted "Brackeen's fine balance of abstraction and straightforward melody is simply demonstrated on Where Legends Dwell." AllMusic reviewer Michael G. Nastos stated "this is her best work of the past decade. Twelve tracks are all originals. Over 70 minutes of incredibly ingenious jazz included. This is easy to dig into".

== Track listing ==
All compositions by Joanne Brackeen.

1. "Where Legends Dwell" – 6:30
2. "Oahu Lizard" – 6:47
3. "Picasso" – 8:42
4. "Helen Song" – 6:09
5. "Cosmic Ties and Mud Pies" – 2:46
6. "Doris and Anders" – 6:10
7. "Edgar Irving Poe" – 6:11
8. "For Stan" – 6:10
9. "Can This McBee?" – 5:08
10. "Asian Spell" – 7:09
11. "Jump in Jack" – 4:42
12. "How to Think Like a Millionaire" – 3:55

== Personnel ==
- Joanne Brackeen – piano
- Eddie Gómez – bass
- Jack DeJohnette – drums
