= Pink Elephant Magic =

Studio album by Joanne Brackeen
- Released: March 16, 1999
- Recorded: June 2–3 and August 5 & 25, 1998
- Studio: 39th Street Music, NYC
- Genre: Jazz
- Length: 65:30
- Label: Arkadia Jazz; 70371
- Producer: Bob Karcy

Joanne Brackeen chronology
Power Talk (1995)	Pink Elephant Magic (1999)	Popsicle Illusion (2000)

Pink Elephant Magic is an album by American pianist Joanne Brackeen recorded in 1998 and released on the Arkadia Jazz label.

== Reception ==
Professional ratings
Review scores
Source	Rating
AllMusic	4/5 stars
All About Jazz	5/5 stars
The Penguin Guide to Jazz Recordings	4/4 stars

AllMusic reviewer Scott Yanow stated "Joanne Brackeen's 22nd recording as a leader, this CD is one of her best overall recordings due to the high-quality material, the unpredictable arrangements, the variety, and the exciting and inventive solos by the pianist and her sidemen ... The music is quite unpredictable but joyful and ultimately logical. Highly recommended". On All About Jazz, Glenn Astarita noted "Pink Elephant Magic is the complete package as Joanne Brackeen proves beyond a doubt her significant value to the jazz community while some of jazz’ top performers assist in carving out an album that is positively, "magical"".

== Track listing ==
All compositions by Joanne Brackeen except where noted.

1. "Pink Elephant Magic" – 6:40
2. "Ghost Butter" – 5:28
3. "Wave" (Antônio Carlos Jobim) – 5:27
4. "What's Your Choice, Rolls Royce?" – 5:46
5. "Beethoven Meets the Millennium in Spain" – 8:10
6. "Strange Meadowlark" (Dave Brubeck) – 6:46
7. "Tico-Tico" (Zequinha de Abreu) – 5:15
8. "In Vogue" – 8:22
9. "Cram 'n Exam" – 6:21
10. "Filene's" – 7:15

== Personnel ==
- Joanne Brackeen – piano
- Nicholas Payton – trumpet (tracks 1, 5 & 9)
- Dave Liebman – soprano saxophone (tracks 4 & 10)
- Chris Potter – tenor saxophone, soprano saxophone (tracks 1, 5, 8 & 9)
- John Patitucci – bass (tracks 1–5 & 7–10)
- Horacio "El Negro" Hernandez – drums (tracks 1–5 & 7–10)
- Jamey Haddad – percussion (track 5)
- Kurt Elling – vocals (track 4)
