= Trinkets and Things =

Studio album by Joanne Brackeen and Ryo Kawasaki
- Released: 1978
- Recorded: August 13, 1978
- Studio: CI Studio, NYC
- Genre: Jazz
- Label: Timeless; SJP 123
- Producer: Wim Wigt

Joanne Brackeen chronology
AFT (1977)	Trinkets and Things (1978)	Prism (1978)

Trinkets and Things is an album of duets by pianist Joanne Brackeen and guitarist Ryo Kawasaki recorded in 1978 and released on the Dutch Timeless label.

== Reception ==
Professional ratings
Review scores
Source	Rating
AllMusic	4/5 stars

AllMusic reviewer Scott Yanow stated "Joane Brackeen has always been a powerful two-handed pianist. This program of duets with guitarist Ryo Kawasaki finds Brackeen utilizing her left hand in creative fashion, sometimes striding or playing basslines and occasionally implying rather than stating the time. Kawasaki also has plenty of stimulating solos on the set".

== Track listing ==
All compositions by Joanne Brackeen except where noted.

1. "Trinkets and Things" (Ryo Kawasaki) – 5:08
2. "Shadowbrook Air" – 5:58
3. "Winnie and Woodstock" – 5:18
4. "Fair Weather" – 4:42
5. "Whim Within" – 6:36
6. "Spring of Things" – 7:27
7. "Haiti B" – 7:24

== Personnel ==
- Joanne Brackeen – piano
- Ryo Kawasaki – guitar
