= Special Identity =

Studio album by Joanne Brackeen
- Released: 1982
- Recorded: December 8–9, 1981
- Studios: Minot Sound, White Plains, NY
- Genre: Jazz
- Length: 38:37
- Labels: Antilles; AN 1001
- Producer: Helen Keane

Joanne Brackeen chronology
Ancient Dynasty (1980)	Special Identity (1982)	Havin' Fun (1985)

Special Identity is an album by American pianist Joanne Brackeen, recorded in 1981 and released on the Antilles label.

== Reception ==
Professional ratings
Review scores
Source	Rating
AllMusic	3/5 stars
The Penguin Guide to Jazz	3.5/4 stars
The Rolling Stone Jazz Record Guide	4/5 stars

The Penguin Guide to Jazz called it "one of the high points" of her catalogue, stating "it's a beautifully crafted set with a characteristic integration of three voices, not just piano-plus-rhythm, but it's marred by an unsympathetic mix that always seems to be focussing on one element at a time". AllMusic reviewer Scott Yanow stated "The potentially forbidding music (which has advanced modal-based solos) is often surprisingly accessible and full of subtle surprises and close interplay by the musicians. Although not her definitive release, this album keeps Joanne Brackeen's record perfect; every one of her recordings stands up well over time".

== Track listing ==
All compositions by Joanne Brackeen.

1. "Special Identity" – 8:53
2. "Mystic Touch" – 5:53
3. "Egyptian Dune Dance" – 5:02
4. "Enchance" – 5:49
5. "Einstein" – 6:50
6. "Evening in Concert" – 7:42
7. "Friday the Thirteenth" – 5:16

== Personnel ==
- Joanne Brackeen – piano
- Eddie Gómez – bass
- Jack DeJohnette – drums
