= New True Illusion =

Studio album by Joanne Brackeen and Clint Houston
- Released: 1978
- Recorded: July 15, 1976
- Studio: Weesp, Holland
- Genre: Jazz
- Length: 43:17
- Label: Timeless; SJP 103
- Producer: Wim Wigt

Joanne Brackeen chronology
Invitation (1976)	New True Illusion (1978)	Tring-a-Ling (1977)

New True Illusion is an album of duets by pianist Joanne Brackeen and bassist Clint Houston recorded in 1976 and released on the Dutch Timeless label.

== Reception ==
Professional ratings
Review scores
Source	Rating
AllMusic	4/5 stars
The Penguin Guide to Jazz	3/4 stars

The Penguin Guide to Jazz noted "With a restless, unrooted delivery, Brackeen has always gravitated towards strong, very melodic bass players. The two early discs with Houston expose some of his crudities ... but conform expressive strength and presence." AllMusic reviewer Scott Yanow stated "Pianist Joanne Brackeen, already a powerful force by 1976, had her roots in McCoy Tyner but early on developed her own personal voice. This set of post-bop duets with bassist Clint Houston features obscurities by Tyner and Chick Corea, a pair of standards and two of Brackeen's quirky originals. The improvisations are quite advanced, yet often surprisingly melodic and rhythmic. An excellent early effort".

== Track listing ==
All compositions by Joanne Brackeen except where noted.

1. "Steps-What Was" (Chick Corea) – 9:14
2. "Search for Peace" (McCoy Tyner) – 6:07
3. "New True Illusion" – 8:55
4. "My Romance" (Richard Rodgers, Lorenz Hart) – 7:55
5. "Freedent" – 1:41
6. "Solar" (Miles Davis) – 9:25

== Personnel ==
- Joanne Brackeen – piano
- Clint Houston – bass
