= Is It Really True =

Studio album by Joanne Brackeen Trio
- Released: 1991
- Recorded: July 8, 1991
- Genre: Jazz
- Length: 60:45
- Label: Konnex; KCD 5029
- Producer: Manfred Schiek

Joanne Brackeen chronology
| Breath of Brazil (1991) | Is It Really True (1991) | Where Legends Dwell (1991) |

Is It Really True is an album by American pianist Joanne Brackeen recorded in 1991 and released on the German Konnex label.

== Reception ==
Professional ratings
Review scores
| Source | Rating |
|---|---|
| AllMusic | 4/5 stars |

AllMusic reviewer Thom Jurek stated "This 1991 session by pianist Joanne Brackeen, and her wonderful rhythm section of Walter Schmocker on bass and drummer Billy Hart, is one of the classical examples of her stridently open pianism that engages lyric and melody in the same way Bill Evans did, and the force and sense play of Herbie Nichols ... Brackeen is a hell of a composer. Her weighty and knotty harmonics are chameleon-like in their interchangeability from mode to interval to improvisation ... There isn't a weak second on this disc, and, compared to her recordings of the late '70s and early '80s, it's a radical though logical departure that offers its own reward for listening".

== Track listing ==
All compositions by Joanne Brackeen except where noted.

1. "Is It Really True" – 7:38
2. "Haiti-B" – 11:53
3. "Dr. Chu Chow" – 9:16
4. "Just in Time" (Irving Berlin) – 7:30
5. "Estilo Magnifico" – 9:40
6. "In a Sentimental Mood" (Duke Ellington, Manny Kurtz, Irving Mills) – 9:20
7. "C-Sri" – 5:28

== Personnel ==
- Joanne Brackeen – piano
- Walter Schmocker – bass
- Billy Hart – drums
