= Power Talk =

Live album by Joanne Brackeen Trio
- Released: 1994
- Recorded: April 16, 1994
- Venue: Contemporary Arts Center, New Orleans, LA
- Genre: Jazz
- Length: 66:48
- Label: Turnipseed; TMCD.08
- Producer: Don Turnipseed

Joanne Brackeen chronology
Take a Chance (1993)	Power Talk (1994)	Pink Elephant Magic (1999)

Power Talk is a live album by American pianist Joanne Brackeen recorded in New Orleans in 1994 and released on the Turnipseed label.

== Reception ==
Professional ratings
Review scores
Source	Rating
AllMusic	4/5 stars
The Penguin Guide to Jazz Recordings	3.5/4 stars

AllMusic reviewer Ken Dryden stated "Joanne Brackeen's concert at the Contemporary Art Center may not have gotten wide distribution and exposure, but it is one of her best releases. With a capable rhythm section including bassist Ira Coleman and drummer Tony Reedus, she gives an audience their money's worth and more".

== Track listing ==
All compositions by Joanne Brackeen except where noted.

1. "There Is No Greater Love" (Isham Jones, Marty Symes) – 8:17
2. "Picasso" – 12:37
3. "My Funny Valentine" (Richard Rodgers, Lorenz Hart) – 10:24
4. "Just One of Those Things" (Cole Porter) – 8:05
5. "Darn That Dream" (Jimmy Van Heusen, Eddie DeLange) – 6:04
6. "Caravan" (Juan Tizol, Duke Ellington, Irving Mills) – 9:15
7. "Power Talk" – 9:29
8. "Cosmic Ties and Mud Pies" – 2:37

== Personnel ==
- Joanne Brackeen – piano
- Ira Coleman – bass
- Tony Reedus – drums
