= Havin' Fun =

Studio album by Joanne Brackeen Trio
- Released: 1985
- Recorded: June 1985
- Studio: New York
- Genre: Jazz
- Label: Concord Jazz; CJ-280
- Producer: Carl E. Jefferson

Joanne Brackeen chronology
Special Identity (1981)	Havin' Fun (1985)	Fi-Fi Goes to Heaven (1986)

Havin' Fun is an album of jazz standards by American pianist Joanne Brackeen recorded in 1985 and released on the Concord Jazz label.

== Reception ==
Professional ratings
Review scores
Source	Rating
AllMusic	4/5 stars
The Penguin Guide to Jazz	4/4 stars

The Penguin Guide to Jazz noted "The sound is lovely with lots of definition on both bass and percussion. Foster is perhaps a little straight-ahead for this type of thing, but McBee is absolutely solid". AllMusic reviewer Scott Yanow stated "Brackeen's distinctive style is heard very much intact in this fairly accessible format, and she makes the ancient tunes sound fresh. Recommended".

== Track listing ==
1. "Thinking of You" (Harry Ruby, Bert Kalmar) – 4:58
2. "I've Got The World On A String" (Harold Arlen, Ted Koehler) – 5:28
3. "Emily" (Johnny Mandel, Johnny Mercer) – 6:48
4. "Just One of Those Things" (Cole Porter) – 4:01
5. "This Is Always" (Harry Warren, Mack Gordon) – 5:11
6. "Everything She Wants" (George Michael) – 4:15
7. "Manhã de Carnaval" (Luiz Bonfá, Antônio Maria) – 7:17
8. "Day by Day" (Axel Stordahl, Paul Weston, Sammy Cahn) – 5:31

== Personnel ==
- Joanne Brackeen – piano
- Cecil McBee – bass
- Al Foster – drums
