= Trio da Paz =

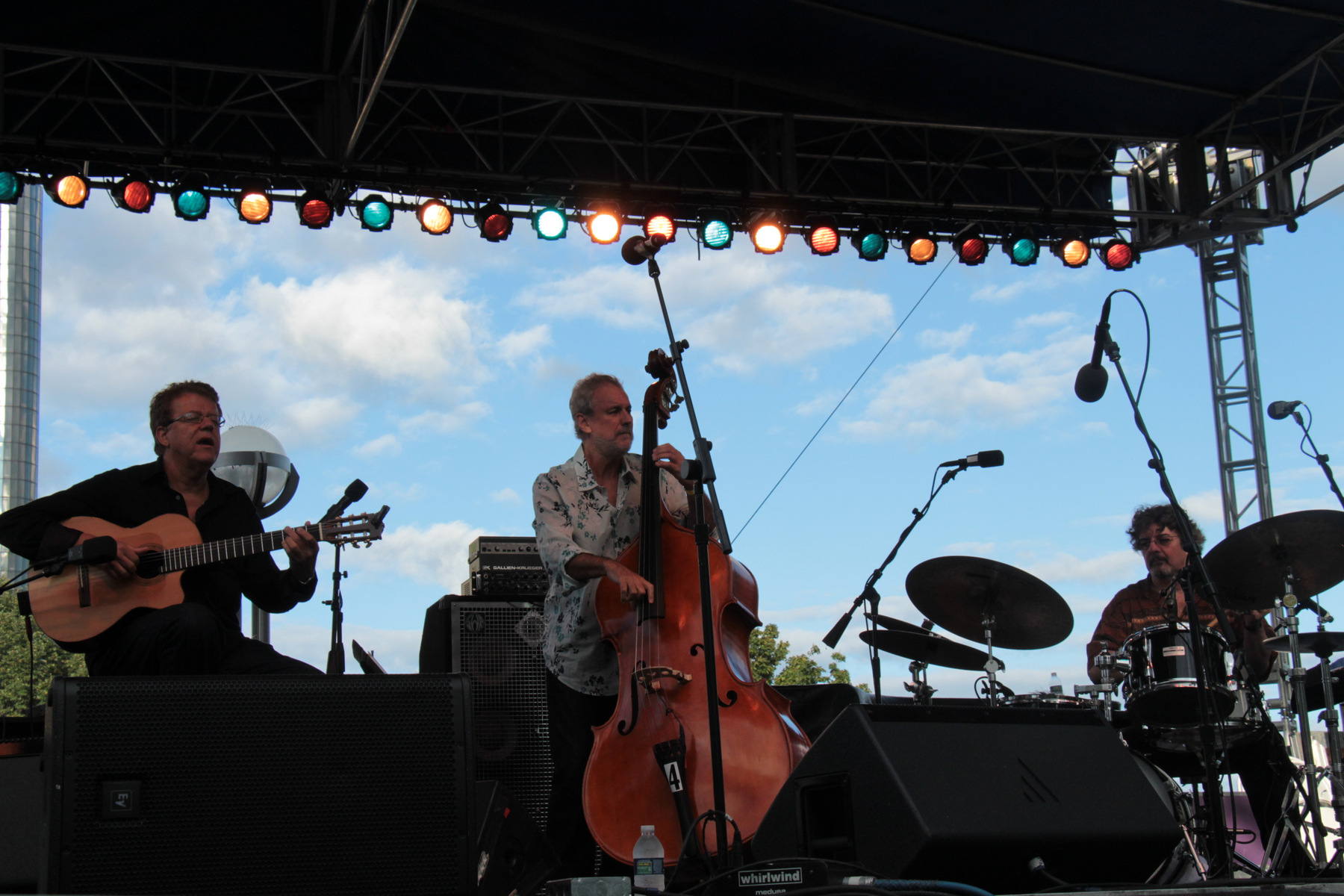
- Trio da Paz in 2013

Background information
- Genres: Brazilian jazz
- Years active: 1986–present
- Members: Romero Lubambo; Nilson Matta; Duduka Da Fonseca
- Website: www.triodapaz.com

Trio da Paz is a Brazilian jazz group formed in 1986 that consists of Romero Lubambo on guitar, Nilson Matta on bass and Duduka Da Fonseca on drums. They’ve been nominated by the 59th Annual Grammy Awards for Best Latin Jazz Album.

== Discography ==
- Brasil from the Inside (Concord Picante, 1992)
- Black Orpheus (Kokopelli, 1994)
- Partido Out (Malandro, 1998)
- Cafe (Malandro, 2002)
- Somewhere (Blue Toucan Music, 2006)
- Harry Allen with Trio Da Paz (Swingbros, 2007)
- Live at JazzBaltica (Maxjazz, 2008)
- Night of My Beloved (Venus, 2008)
- 30 (Zoho, 2016)

With Kenny Barron

- Canta Brasil (Sunnyside, 2002)
