= Nilson Matta =

Brazilian bassist and composer

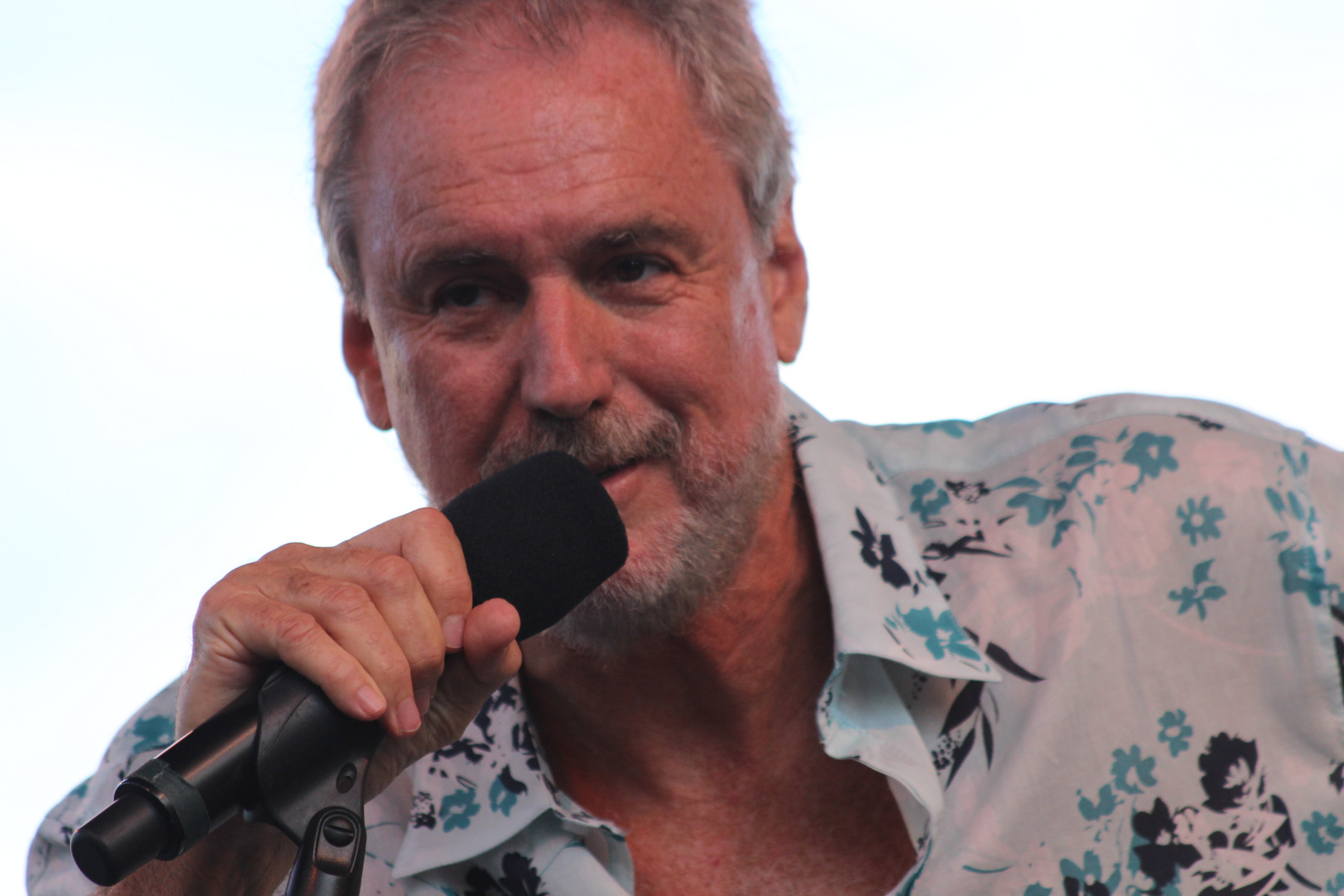

Background information
- Origin: São Paulo, Brazil
- Genres: Brazilian Music, jazz
- Occupation(s): Musician, composer, educator, arranger, producer
- Instrument(s): Acoustic bass vertical electric upright bass electric six-string bass
- Years active: 1960s–present
- Labels: Motéma Music, Zoho Music
- Website: nilsonmatta.com

Nilson Matta is a Brazilian bassist and composer. He has been based in New York City since 1985. He is also known for his work with Trio da Paz, Don Pullen African Brazilian Connection, Joe Henderson, Yo Yo Ma and Nilson Matta's Brazilian Voyage.

== Biography ==
Nilson studied bass at the Federal University of Rio de Janeiro (UFRJ) with Sandrino Santoro, a Brazilian classical bass player. During his years living in Brazil, Nilson played the bass with musicians such as João Gilberto, Hermeto Pascoal, Roberto Carlos (singer), Chico Buarque de Holanda, Nana Caymmi, João Bosco, Johnny Alf, Helio Delmiro, Luis Bonfá, MPB4, and Roberto Carlos.

Nilson moved to New York City in 1985. Since that time he has performed and recorded with artists as Joe Henderson, Paquito D'Rivera, Slide Hampton, Herbie Mann, Mark Murphy, Oscar Castro Neves, Don Friedman, Paul Winter, and Gato Barbieri.

After moving to New York City, Nilson co-founded the project "The African Brazilian Connection" with pianist Don Pullen. The group released three albums on Blue Note Records. Nilson then started a project of his own with longtime friends Romero Lubambo and Duduka da Fronseca - "Trio Da Paz". The trio released five albums.

From 1995 through 1998, Matta worked extensively with saxophonist Joe Henderson. Nilson played on the album Joe Henderson Big Band, which won the Grammy Award for Best Large Jazz Ensemble Performance in 1998. Yo Yo Ma selected Nilson to play on Obrigado Brazil and Obrigado Brazil – Live in Carnegie Hall Concert with Yo Yo Ma, both of which were Grammy winners. These albums prompted a worldwide tour that lasted for two years. Nilson also recorded with Yo Yo Ma on his album Songs of Joy & Peace in 2008.

Since 2006, Nilson has been focused on many of his own projects. That year he released Walking with My Bass. He is a member of the International Society of Bassists and often appears as a featured guest and performer at their conventions. Matta is also well known for his teaching ability, which has been showcased in different settings through the country. Nilson gives lessons to young bassists in addition to his master classes. He has taught at Litchfield Jazz Campus. Nilson is the Artistic/Music Director of Samba Meets Jazz Workshops, with vocal and instrumental programs for adults in Bar Harbor, ME, Boston's North Shore, as well as in international locations.

== Discography ==
=== As sideman ===
Year recorded	Leader	Title	Label
2002	Cyro Baptista	Beat the Donkey	Tzadik
2002	Kenny Barron	Canta Brasil	Sunnyside
1999	Charlie Byrd	My Inspiration: Music of Brazil	Concord
1989	Paquito D'Rivera	Return to Ipanema	Town Crier
1989	Paquito D'Rivera	Tico! Tico!	Chesky
2002	Yoshiko Kishino	Siesta	GRP
1995	Herbie Mann	Celebration	Lightyear
1995	Herbie Mann	America/Brasil	Lightyear
2004	Roseanna Vitro	Tropical Postcards	A Records
