= Kawasaki Synthesizer =

- Cover art
- Developer(s): Ryo Kawasaki
- Publisher(s): Sight & Sound Music Software
- Designer(s): Ryo Kawasaki
- Platform(s): Commodore 64
- Release: 1983
- Genre(s): Music composition

The Kawasaki Synthesizer is a musical software tool for the Commodore 64 created in 1983 by Japanese jazz musician, Ryo Kawasaki. The first of four music programs created by Kawasaki, Kawasaki Synthesizer (1983) was followed by Kawasaki Rhythm Rocker (1984), Kawasaki Magical Musiquill (1985), and Kawasaki MIDI Workstation in 1986 (his only software title intended for professional use instead of personal or educational use).

== Development history ==
As a guitarist, pianist, and violin player, Kawasaki's earliest musical interests tended toward jazz and electronics. Alongside the development of his musical style, he tinkered with electronics like radios, televisions, amplifiers, and speakers. Experimental by nature, Kawasaki had already been performing electric-guitar jazz since the early 1970s when he became interested in music synthesis and purchased a Roland GR-500. Drawn to the possibilities afforded by this emerging technology, he began experimenting in the mid-1970s to develop and create a personal guitar synthesizer in 1980 which he featured in live performances and album releases.

As soon as the Commodore 64 was released in 1982, Kawasaki immediately bought one, paying $600 (equivalent to $1,955 in 2024) for it at an electronics store on 45th street in Manhattan. Within two years he had taught himself to program and after some initial experiments in BASIC (which he found to be too constraining), he switched to machine code and wrote his first program that he titled The Composer. Taking full advantage of the computer's programmable filter and the onboard Sound Interface Device (SID), The Composer was designed to produce synth effects beyond that of his guitar synthesizer. Tinkering with The Composer further, Kawasaki expanded its capabilities and began to refine it into separate programs designed to highlight different aspects of the original program. Marketed through Sight & Sound Music Software, the first two packages were Kawasaki Synthesizer and Kawasaki Rhythm Rocker. In total, Kawasaki made four programs using SuperMon (a tool created by Jim Butterfield) that he released commercially on 5¼-inch floppy for $29.95–$49.95 (equivalent to $94.55–$157.69 in 2024) each as well as an unpublished 8-track real-time MIDI recorder called Midi-Workstation. These synthesizers would be used in the development of a number of significant early house singles, and would feature in his 1984 CES performance and on Kawasaki's 1983 album, Lucky Lady.

== Usage ==
The Kawasaki Synthesizer was sold as a 2-disk package. The first disk, "The Performer", is divided into 8 different screens including Demos like the synchronized graphics/music demo entitled "Kawasaki Space Dance Theatre", a Keyboard Mode allowing input from the Commodore keyboard (top two rows) or Sight & Sound's "Incredible Musical Keyboard" (IMK) and selection of 21 preset instrumental/effects options and 13 pre-recorded songs with 2 LPs. The second disk, "The Composer" (an expansion of Kawasaki's original The Composer program), is divided into 4 different screens including a Keyboard Page allowing Monophonic or Polyphonic mode, a Sound Editing Page, and options to perform multifile chaining and three-track recording.

The program came with a software version of a techno track by Kawasaki entitled "Satellite Station", and it allowed a user to select notes to be played and create songs that could then be saved. Numerous other typically Kawasakian influences were also notably discernible, including the "Kawasaki Space Dance Theatre" which depicted The Kicker Brothers, a pair of Thai kick boxers who would kick in time to the music. The program was regarded as having a dream-like fairy-tale atmosphere, and as future programs were released the color schemes (for example in Kawasaki Magical Musiquill) became increasingly psychedelic.

== Reception ==
Reviewers from Compute!'s Gazette described Kawasaki Synthesizer as fast, intuitive, and spontaneous. Comparing Kawasaki Synthesizer to Peter Englebrite's Music Processor (which was also released by Sight & Sound for Commodore 64), reviewers found that the Kawasaki Synthesizer would most likely appeal to keyboard performers whereas the Music Processor would be better appreciated by musical arrangers. The review noted that the Sound Editing Page in "The Composer" module was the most important of the two discs, that the documentation was superb, and concluded that Kawasaki Synthesizer is "reasonably priced, brilliantly programmed, [and] attractively packaged".

== Later synthesizers ==
=== Kawasaki Rhythm Rocker ===
Kawasaki Rhythm Rocker (developed in March 1984 and released in June of the same year) was noted to be considerably different from Kawasaki Synthesizer despite the fact that it used a similar keyboard input and was designed to allow the player to create music in a synthesizer style. The program featured space sounds and high-resolution graphics, a theme that would become common throughout Kawasaki's programs. Kawasaki Rhythm Rocker allowed the player to alter tempo, dub, and bass, and to record his compositions.

=== Kawasaki Magical Musiquill ===
The most colorful of Kawasaki's applications, Kawasaki Magical Musiquill was the last program Kawasaki designed as a non-game for children, with his next release, Kawasaki MIDI Workstation, designed as a serious work for professional studio use.

=== Kawasaki MIDI Workstation ===
Developed in 1986, Kawasaki MIDI Workstation was Kawasaki's only work of professional software, and after finishing this program he founded Satellites Records in 1987 and returned to making music of his own.

== See also ==
Ryo Kawasaki
