= Romero Lubambo =

Brazilian jazz guitarist

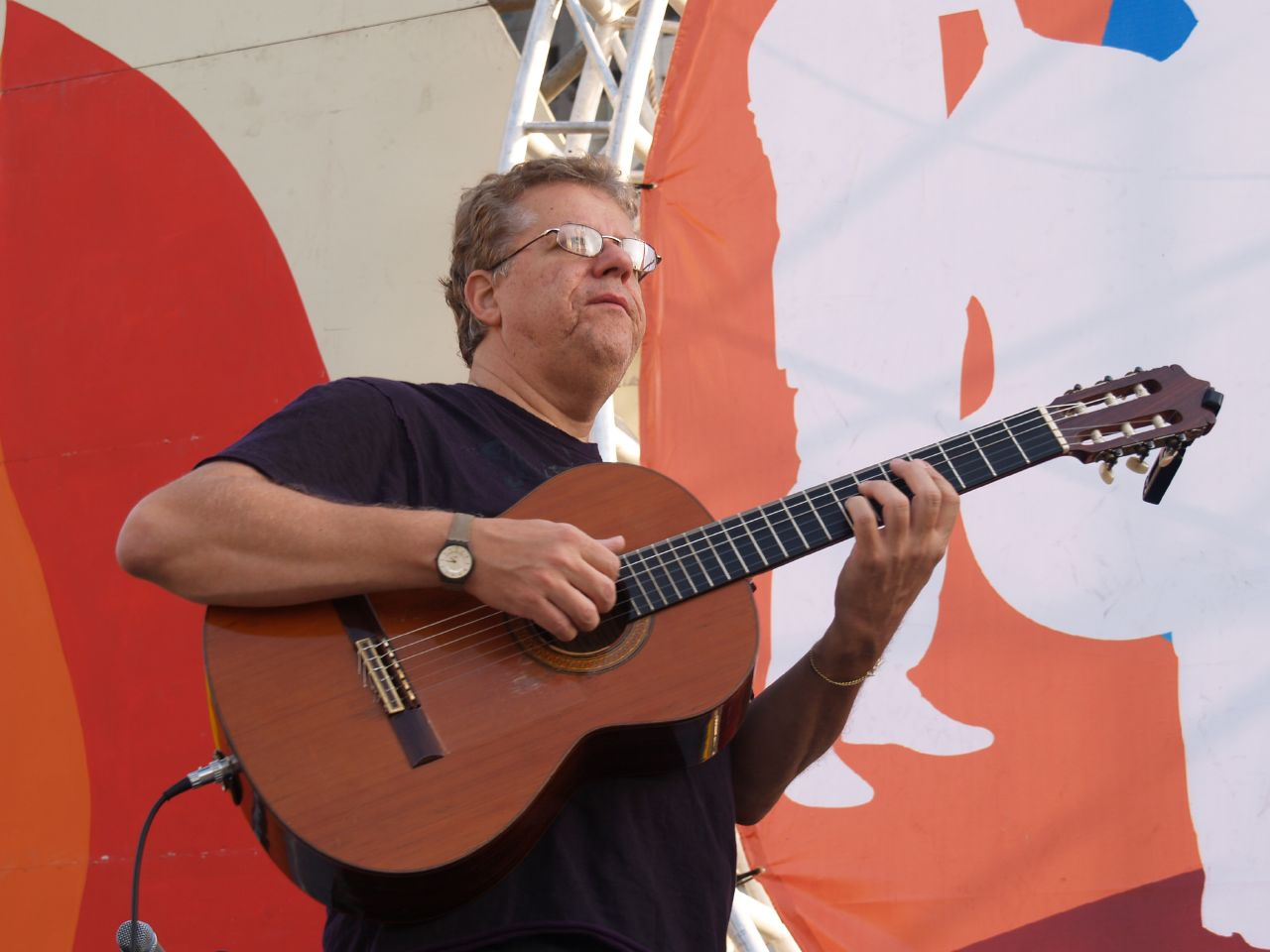
- Lubambo in 2006

Background information
- Born: 1955 (age 70–71); Rio de Janeiro, Brazil
- Genres: Brazilian jazz
- Occupation: Musician
- Instrument: Guitar
- Years active: 1980–present
- Labels: GSP, Avant, Chesky, Maxjazz, Sunnyside
- Website: www.romerolubambo.com

Romero Lubambo (born 1955) is a Brazilian jazz guitarist.

== Career ==
He was born in Rio de Janeiro, Brazil. He grew up with American jazz and classical music in the house because his uncle played guitar, lived next door, and visited frequently. Lubambo tried classical piano for two years but quit. At thirteen, he picked up the guitar and taught himself how to play because there was no one else around to do it. The following year he joined a band and performed professionally for the first time. From 1972 to 1977, he attended the Villa-Lobos School of Music to study classical guitar. He went to college and got a degree in engineering in 1980, but he pursued music instead.

After moving to the U.S. in 1985, he worked with singer Astrud Gilberto. During the next year, he met Herbie Mann, whom Lubambo considered "my American father, my mentor for life." He formed Trio da Paz with Duduka da Fonseca and Nilson Matta and has recorded and toured with them. He tours extensively with Dianne Reeves. He has also worked with Claudia Acuña, Leny Andrade, Gato Barbieri, Michael Brecker, Larry Coryell, Regina Carter, Dave Douglas, Paquito D'Rivera, Diana Krall, Ivan Lins, Wynton Marsalis, Pat Metheny, Jason Miles, Jane Monheit, Hermeto Pascoal, Flora Purim and Airto Moreira, Dan Costa (composer), Luciana Souza and Billie Eilish.

Dos Navegantes, a collaboration album by him, Edu Lobo and Mauro Senise, won the 2017 Latin Grammy Award for Best MPB Album.

== Discography ==
=== As leader ===
- Autonomia with Rildo Hora (Visom, 1990)
- Face to Face, with Weber Drummond (GSP, 1993)
- Shades of Rio, with Raphael Rabello (Chesky, 1993)
- Infinite Love with Gil Goldstein (Big World, 1993)
- Coisa Fina with Leny Andrade (Perfil, 1994)
- Two (GSP, 1994)
- Lubambo (Avant, 1999)
- Duo, with César Camargo Mariano (Sunnyside, 2002)
- Brazilian Routes (Rob, 2002)
- Rio de Janeiro Underground (Victor, 2003)
- Romero Lubambo & Lica Cecat (Sony, 2003)
- Coisa Fina, with Leny Andrade (Perfil, 2003)
- Softly with Herbie Mann (Maxjazz, 2006)
- Love Dance (JVC, 2007)
- Bons Amigos (Resonance, 2011
- Só: Brazilian Essence (Sunnyside, 2014)
- Setembro: A Brazilian Under the Jazz Influence (Sunnyside, 2015)
- Todo Sentimento with Mauro Senise (2016)
- Sampa (Sunnyside, 2017)
- Rio Meets New Orleans (Open Studio, 2019)
- Live at Dizzy's (Sunnyside, 2021)
- Two Brothers (Sunnyside, 2023)

With Trio da Paz

- Brazil from the Inside (Concord, 1992)
- Black Orpheus (Kokopelli, 1994)
- Somewhere (Blue Toucan, 2005)
- Live at Jazz Baltica (Maxjazz, 2008)

=== As a featured artist ===
- Skyness, Dan Costa (composer) (2018)

=== As sideman ===
- Claudia Acuña, Rhythm of Life (Verve, 2002)
- Kenny Barron, Canta Brasil (Sunnyside, 2002)
- Charlie Byrd, Plays Jobim (Concord, 2002)
- Joey Calderazzo, Amanecer (Marsalis Music, 2006)
- Ann Hampton Callaway, Slow (Shanachie, 2004)
- James Carter, Chasin' the Gypsy (Atlantic, 2000)
- David Chesky, The New York Chorinhos (Chesky, 1990)
- Paquito D'Rivera, Tico! Tico! (Chesky, 1989)
- Dave Douglas, Freak In (RCA, 2003)
- Eliane Elias, Light My Fire (Concord 2011)
- Dizzy Gillespie, Rhythmstick (1990)
- Diane Hubka, You Inspire Me (VSOJAZ, 2001)
- Lee Konitz, Brazilian Rhapsody (Musicmasters, 1995)
- Herbie Mann, Jasil Brazz (1987)
- Herbie Mann, Caminho de Casa (Chesky, 1990)
- Eric Marienthal, Sweet Talk (Peak, 2003)
- Jason Miles, Brazilian Nights (2002)
- Sophie Milman, In the Moonlight (Linus Entertainment, 2011)
- Jane Monheit, Taking a Chance on Love (Sony Classical, 2004)
- Jane Monheit, The Heart of the Matter (EmArcy, 2013)
- Marisa Monte, Mais (World Pacific, 1991)
- Emily Remler, This Is Me (Justice, 1990)
- Claudio Roditi, Simpatico (Resonance, 2010)
- Robert Sadin, Art of Love: Music of Machaut (Deutsche Grammophon, 2009)
- Janis Siegel, Sketches of Broadway (Telarc, 2004)
- Luciana Souza, The New Bossa Nova (Verve, 2007)
- Roseanna Vitro, Tropical Postcards (A- Records, 2004)
- Grover Washington, Trios (2004)
