= Breath of Brazil =

Studio album by Joanne Brackeen
- Released: 1991
- Recorded: April 18–19, 1991
- Genre: Jazz
- Length: 66:05
- Label: Concord Picante; CCD-4479
- Producer: Carl Jefferson

Joanne Brackeen chronology
Live at Maybeck Recital Hall, Volume 1 (1989)	Breath of Brazil (1991)	Is It Really True (1991)

Breath of Brazil is an album by American pianist Joanne Brackeen recorded in 1991 and released on the Concord Jazz label.

== Reception ==
Professional ratings
Review scores
Source	Rating
AllMusic	4.5/5 stars
The Penguin Guide to Jazz	3/4 stars

The Penguin Guide to Jazz noted "Surprisingly, it's a rather reserved and thoughtful set under all the noise and bustle". AllMusic reviewer Scott Yanow stated "Although one would not think that Brackeen's percussive and adventurous style would sound comfortable playing softer Brazilian pieces, the pianist modified her style a bit and shows surprising flexibility. This is a delightful set". On All About Jazz, William Grim stated "Joanne Brackeen is an excellent jazz pianist who deserves much wider recognition. Breath of Brasil is a good introduction to this fine performer, and if you’re already a fan it’s another 'must have' for the cd collection".

== Track listing ==
All compositions by Joanne Brackeen except where noted.

1. "Madalena" (Ivan Lins-Ronaldo Monteiro de Souza) – 6:34
2. "Velas" (Lins-Vítor Martins) – 5:48
3. "Águas de Março (Waters of March)" (Antônio Carlos Jobim) – 6:10
4. "Guessing Game" – 3:34
5. "Breath of Brazil" – 4:33
6. "Seu Encanto (The Face I Love" (Marcos Valle) – 7:08
7. "Loro" (Egberto Gismonti) – 4:22
8. "So Many Stars" (Sérgio Mendes, Alan Bergman, Marilyn Keith) – 5:29
9. "Anos Dourados" (Jobim-Chico Buarque) – 5:35
10. "Brasileiro Escondido" – 6:25
11. "Flora" (Gilberto Gil) – 5:09
12. "Samba do Soho" (Paulo Jobim-Ronaldo Bastos) – 5:18

== Personnel ==
- Joanne Brackeen – piano
- Eddie Gómez – bass
- Duduka da Fonseca – drums
- Waltinho Anastácio – percussion
