= Leila Pinheiro =

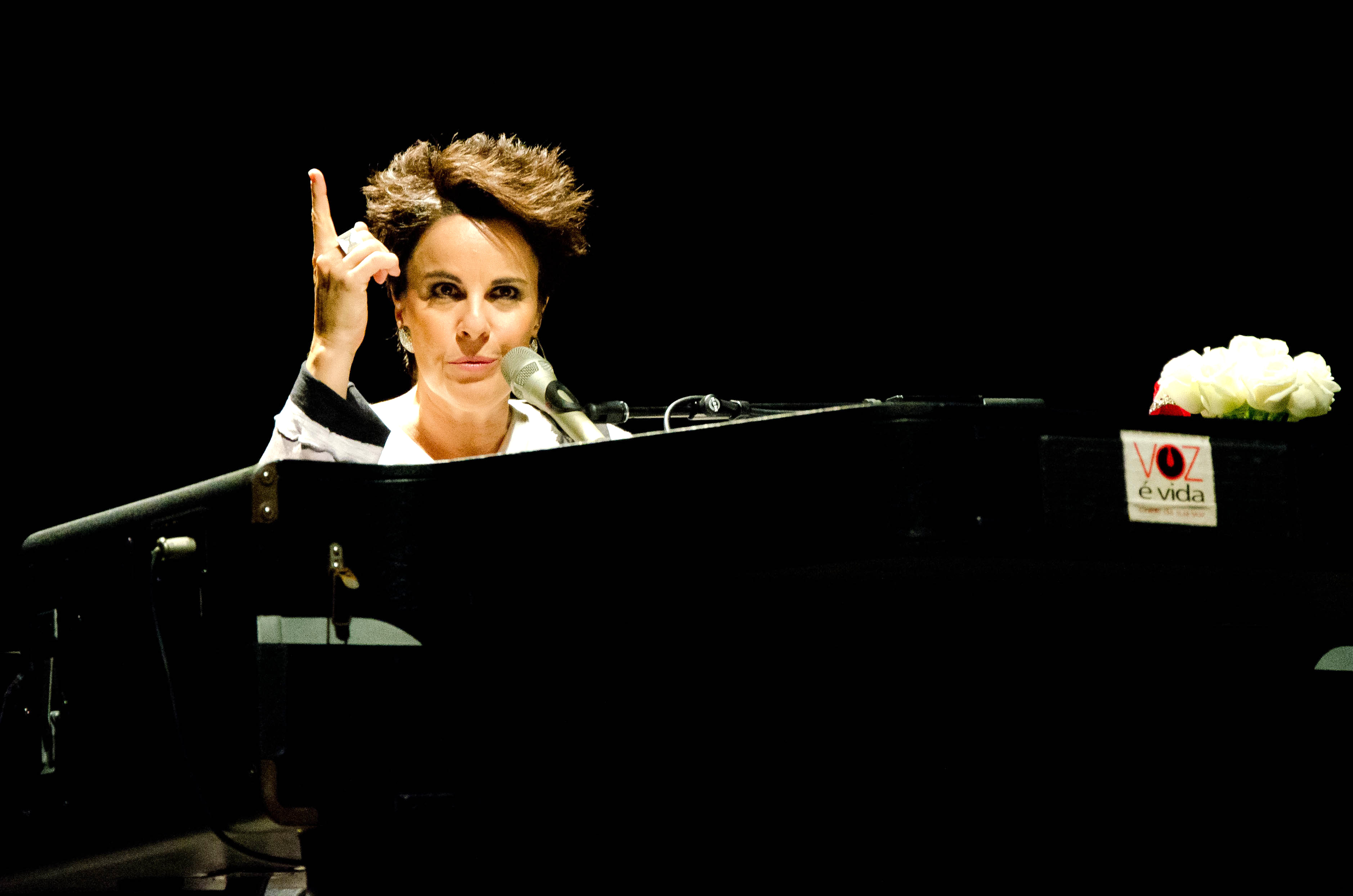
- Pinheiro in 2012

Background information
- Born: October 16, 1960 (age 65); Belém, Pará, Brazil
- Genre: Bossa Nova
- Years active: 1980 – presente
- Labels: Biscoito Fino, EMI Music, Microservice, PolyGram, Universal Music, Verve Records

Leila Pinheiro (born October 16, 1960, in Belém) is a Brazilian Bossa Nova singer, pianist and composer. Her self-titled debut album had the guest performances of Tom Jobim, João Donato, Ivan Lins, Francis Hime, and Toninho Horta, and she later went on to perform with artists such as Zimbo Trio, Pat Metheny, Baden Powell and Toquinho. She represented Brazil at the OTI Festival 1987 with the song "Estrela do norte".

== Discography ==
=== As a leader ===
Title	Details
Leila Pinheiro	Released: January 1983; Label: independent; Format: Vinil
Olho Nu	Released: July 1986; Label: Deck produções; Format: LP, CD
Alma	Released: 8 March 1988; Label: Philips; Format: LP, CD
Bênção, Bossa Nova	Released: November 1989; Label: Philips; Format: LP, CD
Outras Caras	Released: 15 July 1991; Label: Philips, PolyGram; Format: LP, CD
Coisas do Brasil	Released: July 1993; Label: Philips; Format: CD
Isso é Bossa Nova	Released: 13 October 1994; Label: EMI; Format: CD
Catavento e Girassol	Released: 1996; Label: EMI; Format: CD
Na Ponta da Língua	Released: 14 September 1998; Label: EMI; Format: CD
Reencontro	Released: July 2000; Label: EMI; Format: CD
Mais Coisas do Brasil	Released: 2001; Label: EMI; Format: CD
Nos Horizontes do Mundo	Released: 2005; Label: Biscoito Fino; Format: CD
Nos Horizontes do Mundo - ao Vivo	Released: 2007; Label: Biscoito Fino; Format: CD, DVD
Agarradinhos (Leila Pinheiro and Roberto Menescal)	Released: 2007; Label: EMI; Format: CD
Pra Iluminar (Leila Pinheiro and Eduardo Gudin)	Released: 2009; Label: Tacacá Music; Format: CD, DVD
Meu Segredo Mais Sincero	Released: June 2010; Label: Biscoito Fino; Format: CD
Raiz	Released: 2012; Label: Biscoito Fino; Format: CD
Céu e Mar	Released: 2013; Label: Biscoito Fino; Format: CD
Por Onde Eu For	Released: 2015; Label: Biscoito Fino; Format: EP

=== As a featured artist ===
- 2016 - Suite Três Rios - Dan Costa (Composer)

=== DVDs ===
- 2001 - Mais Coisas do Brasil - ao vivo
- 2007 - Nos Horizontes do Mundo - ao vivo
- 2007 - Agarradinhos (Leila Pinheiro and Roberto Menescal)
