= Marcos Suzano =

Brazilian percussionist (born 1963)

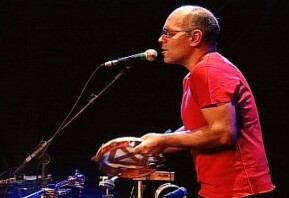
- Marcos Suzano

Background information
- Born: August 14, 1963 (age 63); Rio de Janeiro, Brazil
- Instrument: Pandeiro

Marcos Suzano (born August 14, 1963) is a Brazilian percussionist known for playing with Brazilian and international musicians, such as Gilberto Gil, Nando Reis, and Titãs. He was born in Rio de Janeiro. Originally a rock fan, he witnessed a carnival bloco and became passionate about percussion. He settled on the pandeiro as his primary instrument after discovering Jorginho do Pandeiro of the choro group "Época de Ouro".

By the 1990s, Suzano had become one of the most recorded percussionists in Brazil. His technical innovations on the pandeiro include a left hand which simultaneously holds and flips the instrument, and a right-hand technique that emphasizes bass strokes from the fingertips as well as the thumb. He has researched African rhythms and mixes modern funk riffs with traditional Brazilian folk patterns.

== Discography ==
=== As a leader ===
- Olho de Peixe (with Lenine) (1993)
- Sambatown (1996)
- Flash (2000)
- Satolep Sambatown (with Vitor Ramil) (2007)

=== As a featured artist ===
- Suíte Três Rios - Dan Costa (Composer) (2016)
