= Bill Evans discography =

The following is a listing of the jazz pianist Bill Evans' original albums. He recorded over 50 albums as a leader between 1956 and 1980 and also played as a sideman on nearly as many more. In addition, many recordings, mostly live, continue to be released posthumously. He broke new ground in many of his piano trio, duet, and solo recordings. He received 31 nominations for Grammy Awards and won seven times.

== Discography ==
=== As leader ===
Year of recording	Title	Notes	Year of release	Label
1956-09	New Jazz Conceptions	Trio with Teddy Kotick (bass), Paul Motian (drums)	1957-02	Riverside
1958-12	Everybody Digs Bill Evans	Trio with Sam Jones (b), Philly Joe Jones (d)	1959-03	Riverside
1959-01	On Green Dolphin Street	Trio with Paul Chambers (b), Philly Joe Jones (d)	1975	Milestone
1959-03	The Ivory Hunters	Quartet with Bob Brookmeyer (piano instead of usual trombone), Percy Heath (b), Connie Kay (d)	1959-09	United Artists
1959-12	Portrait in Jazz	Trio with Scott LaFaro (b), Paul Motian (d)	1960	Riverside
1961-02	Explorations	Trio with Scott LaFaro (b), Paul Motian (d)	1961-03	Riverside
1961-06	Sunday at the Village Vanguard	Live - Trio with Scott LaFaro (b), Paul Motian (d)	1961-10	Riverside
1961-06	Waltz for Debby	Live - Trio with Scott LaFaro (b), Paul Motian (d)	1962	Riverside
1961–12 & 1962-05	Nirvana	Herbie Mann (flute) and Bill Evans Trio with Chuck Israels (b), Paul Motian (d)	1964-10	Atlantic
1962-04&05	Undercurrent	Duo with Jim Hall (guitar)	1962-08	United Artists
1962-05&06	Moon Beams	Trio with Chuck Israels (b), Paul Motian (d)	1962-12	Riverside
1962-04-06	How My Heart Sings!	Trio with Chuck Israels (b), Paul Motian (d)	1964-01	Riverside
1962-07	Interplay	Quintet with Freddie Hubbard (trumpet), Jim Hall (g), Percy Heath (b), Philly Joe Jones (d)	1963-06	Riverside
1962-08	Empathy	Trio with Monty Budwig (b), Shelly Manne (d)	1962-12	Verve
1962-08	Loose Blues	Quintet with Zoot Sims (tenor sax), Jim Hall (g), Ron Carter (b), Philly Joe Jones (d)	1983	Milestone
1963-01	The Solo Sessions, Vol. 1	Solo	1989	Milestone
1963-01	The Solo Sessions, Vol. 2	Solo	1992	Milestone
1963-01	The Gary McFarland Orchestra	Orchestra with Special Guest Soloist: Bill Evans	1963	Verve
1963-02&05	Conversations with Myself	Solo, overdubbed - Grammy Award winner	1963	Verve
1963-05	Plays the Theme from The V.I.P.s and Other Great Songs	Orchestra conducted by Claus Ogerman	1963	MGM
1963-05	At Shelly's Manne-Hole	Live - Trio with Chuck Israels (b), Larry Bunker (d)	1963	Riverside
1963-05	Time Remembered	Live - Trio with Chuck Israels (b), Larry Bunker (d) (with solo recordings from 1958 & 1962)	1983	Milestone
1963-12	Trio 64	Trio with Gary Peacock (b), Paul Motian (d)	1964-07	Verve
1964-05	Stan Getz & Bill Evans	Quartet with Stan Getz (tenor sax), Richard Davis/Ron Carter (b), Elvin Jones (d)	1973	Verve
1964-05	The Bill Evans Trio "Live"	Live - Trio with Chuck Israels (b), Larry Bunker (d)	1971	Verve
1964-08	Waltz for Debby	Singer Monica Zetterlund & trio with Chuck Israels (b), Larry Bunker (d)	1964-12	Philips
1964-08	Tales: Live in Copenhagen	Live - Trio with Chuck Israels (b), Larry Bunker (d) (1 bonus track from 1969)	2023-11	Elemental Music
1965-02	Trio '65	Trio with Chuck Israels (b), Larry Bunker (d)	1965-06	Verve
1965-10&12	Bill Evans Trio with Symphony Orchestra	Orchestra conducted by Claus Ogerman and Bill Evans Trio with Chuck Israels (b), Larry Bunker/Grady Tate (d)	1966	Verve
1966-02	Bill Evans at Town Hall	Live - Trio with Chuck Israels (b), Arnold Wise (d)	1966	Verve
1966-04&05	Intermodulation	Duo with Jim Hall (g)	1966	Verve
1966-05	Portraits at the Penthouse: Live in Seattle	Trio with Eddie Gómez (b), Joe Hunt (d)	2025-12	Resonance
1966-10	A Simple Matter of Conviction	Trio with Eddie Gómez (b), Shelly Manne (d)	1967-01	Verve
1966-10	Live in Oslo 1966	Live - Trio with Eddie Gómez (b), Alex Riel (Oslo) and Marty Morell (New Jersey) (d)	2007	Impro-Jazz a.o. (DVD)
1967-08	Further Conversations with Myself	Solo, overdubbed	1967-12	Verve
1967-08	California Here I Come	Live - Trio with Eddie Gómez (b), Philly Joe Jones (d)	1982	Verve
1968-06	Bill Evans at the Montreux Jazz Festival	Live - Trio with Eddie Gómez (b), Jack DeJohnette (d) - Grammy Award winner	1968	Verve
1968-06	Some Other Time: The Lost Session from the Black Forest	Trio with Eddie Gómez (b), Jack DeJohnette (d)	2016-04	Resonance
1968-06	Another Time: The Hilversum Concert	Live - Trio with Eddie Gómez (b), Jack DeJohnette (d)	2017-09	Resonance
1968-07	Live at Ronnie Scott's	Live - Trio with Eddie Gómez (b), Jack DeJohnette (d)	2020-12	Resonance
1968-09&10	Alone	Solo - Grammy Award winner	1970-04	Verve
1968-10	Live at Art D'Lugoff's Top of the Gate	Live - Trio with Eddie Gómez (b), Marty Morell (d)	2012-06	Resonance
1969-01-03	What's New	Quartet with Jeremy Steig (flute), Eddie Gómez (b), Marty Morell (d)	1969	Verve
1969-03&11	Behind the Dikes: The 1969 Netherlands Recordings	Live - Trio with Eddie Gómez (b), Marty Morell (d); 2 tracks with orchestra arranged by Claus Ogerman	2021-06	Elemental Music
1969	Autumn Leaves	Trio with Eddie Gómez (b), Marty Morell (d)	1980	Lotus
1969-11	Jazzhouse	Live - Trio with Eddie Gómez (b), Marty Morell (d)	1987	Milestone
1969-11	You're Gonna Hear from Me	Live - Trio with Eddie Gómez (b), Marty Morell (d)	1988	Milestone
1969-11	Quiet Now	Live - Trio with Eddie Gómez (b), Marty Morell (d)	1981	Charly
1969-12	Evans in England	Live - Trio with Eddie Gómez (b), Marty Morell (d)	2019-04	Resonance
1969-10&11 and 1970-03-05	From Left to Right	Orchestra conducted by Michael Leonard	1971-02	MGM
1970-06	Montreux II	Live - Trio with Eddie Gómez (b), Marty Morell (d)	1970	CTI
1970-06	Bill Evans in Norway: The Kongsberg Concert	Live - Trio with Eddie Gómez (b), Marty Morell (d)	2024-12	Elemental Music
1971-05&06	The Bill Evans Album	Trio with Eddie Gómez (b), Marty Morell (d) - Grammy Award winner	1971-09	Columbia
1972-02	Live in Paris 1972 (3 Vol.)	Live - Trio with Eddie Gómez (b), Marty Morell (d)	1988	France's Concert
1972-05	Living Time	Orchestra conducted by George Russell	1972	Columbia
1972-02	Momentum	Live - Trio with Eddie Gómez (b), Marty Morell (d)	2012-10	Limetree
1973-01	The Tokyo Concert	Live - Trio with Eddie Gómez (b), Marty Morell (d)	1974-08	Fantasy
1973-06	Morning Glory: The 1973 Concert at the Teatro Gran Rex, Buenos Aires	Live - Trio with Eddie Gómez (b), Marty Morell (d)	2022-04	Resonance
1973-11	Half Moon Bay	Live - Trio with Eddie Gómez (b), Marty Morell (d)	1998	Milestone
1974-01	Since We Met	Live - Trio with Eddie Gómez (b), Marty Morell (d)	1976	Fantasy
1974-01	Re: Person I Knew	Live - Trio with Eddie Gómez (b), Marty Morell (d)	1981	Fantasy
1974-02	Symbiosis	Orchestra conducted by Claus Ogerman and Bill Evans Trio with Eddie Gómez (b), Marty Morell (d)	1974	MPS
1974-09	But Beautiful	Live - Stan Getz (tenor sax) and Bill Evans Trio with Eddie Gómez (b), Marty Morell (d)	1996-03	Milestone
1974-08	Blue in Green: The Concert in Canada	Live - Trio with Eddie Gómez (b), Marty Morell (d)	1991	Milestone
1974-11	Intuition	Duo with Eddie Gómez (b)	1975-07	Fantasy
1975-06	On a Friday Evening	Trio with Eddie Gómez (b), Eliot Zigmund (d)	2021-04	Craft
1975-06	The Tony Bennett/Bill Evans Album	Duo with singer Tony Bennett	1975-07	Fantasy
1975-07	Montreux III	Live - Duo with Eddie Gómez (b)	1975	Fantasy
1975-12	Alone Again	Solo	1977-12	Fantasy
1976-05	Quintessence	Quintet with Harold Land (tenor sax), Kenny Burrell (g), Ray Brown (b), Philly Joe Jones (d)	1977-09	Fantasy
1976-09	Together Again	Duo with singer Tony Bennett	1977	Improv
1976-11	The Complete Fantasy Recordings Vol. 7	Trio with Eddie Gómez (b), Eliot Zigmund (d)	1996	Fantasy
1976-11	On a Monday Evening	Trio with Eddie Gómez (b), Eliot Zigmund (d)	2017-01	Fantasy
1977-02	Crosscurrents	Quintet with Lee Konitz (alto sax), Warne Marsh (tenor sax), Eddie Gómez (b), Eliot Zigmund (d)	1978	Fantasy
1977-05	I Will Say Goodbye	Trio with Eddie Gómez (b), Eliot Zigmund (d) - Grammy Award winner	1980	Fantasy
1977-08	You Must Believe in Spring	Trio with Eddie Gómez (b), Eliot Zigmund (d)	1981-02	Warner Bros.
1978-01	Getting Sentimental	Live - Trio with Michael Moore (b), Philly Joe Jones (d)	2003-08	Milestone
1978-01-02	New Conversations	Solo, overdubbed	1978	Warner Bros.
1978-10	Live at Lulu White's (30 Oct 1979)	Trio with Marc Johnson (b), Joe LaBarbera (d)	2010	DOL
1978-10-11	Affinity	Quintet with Toots Thielemans (harmonica), Larry Schneider (flute; alto & tenor sax), Marc Johnson (b), Eliot Zigmund (d)	1979-04	Warner Bros.
1978-11	Marian McPartland's Piano Jazz	Radio Broadcast: Special guest Bill Evans	1993	Fantasy
1979-08	We Will Meet Again	Quintet with Tom Harrell (trumpet), Larry Schneider (flute; soprano & tenor sax), Marc Johnson (b), Joe LaBarbera (d) - Grammy Award winner	1979	Warner Bros.
1979-09	Live in Buenos Aires 1979	Live - Trio with Marc Johnson (b), Joe LaBarbera (d)	1990	Yellow Note
1979-09	Inner Spirit: The 1979 Concert at Teatro General San Martín, Buenos Aires	Live - Trio with Marc Johnson (b), Joe LaBarbera (d)	2022-04	Resonance
1979-11	Homecoming	Live - Trio with Marc Johnson (b), Joe LaBarbera (d)	1999	Milestone
1979-11	The Paris Concert: Edition One	Live - Trio with Marc Johnson (b), Joe LaBarbera (d)	1983	Elektra Musician
1979-11	The Paris Concert: Edition Two	Live - Trio with Marc Johnson (b), Joe LaBarbera (d)	1984	Elektra Musician
1979-12	Live at Balboa Jazz Club Vol. 1-5	Live - Trio with Marc Johnson (b), Joe LaBarbera (d)	1991	Ivory
1980-06	Turn Out the Stars: The Final Village Vanguard Recordings	Live - Trio with Marc Johnson (b), Joe LaBarbera (d)	1996	Nonesuch
1980-07	Letter to Evan	Live - Trio with Marc Johnson (b), Joe LaBarbera (d)	1994	Dreyfus
1980-08	Turn Out the Stars	Live - Trio with Marc Johnson (b), Joe LaBarbera (d)	1994	Dreyfus
1980-08	His Last Concert in Germany	Live - Trio with Marc Johnson (b), Joe LaBarbera (d)	1996	West Wind
1980-08&09	The Last Waltz: The Final Recordings	Live - Trio with Marc Johnson (b), Joe LaBarbera (d)	2000	Milestone
1980-08&09	Consecration: The Final Recordings Part 2	Live - Trio with Marc Johnson (b), Joe LaBarbera (d)	2002	Milestone

=== Compilations ===
Year	Album	Notes	Label
1982	Eloquence	Live and studio, solo and duo with Eddie Gómez, recorded 1973-75	Fantasy
1984	The Complete Riverside Recordings	Limited edition 18-LP box, re-released as 12-CD set in 1987, recordings	Riverside Records
1986	At the Village Vanguard	Includes 10 master takes from the live 25 June 1961 recordings	Riverside Records
1989	The Complete Fantasy Recordings	9-CD set, recorded 1973-79	Fantasy Records
1993	Jazz Around Midnight		Verve
1995	The Best of Verve		Verve
1996	The Secret Sessions: Recorded at the Village Vanguard	8-CD set, recorded 1966-75	Milestone Records
1997	The Complete Bill Evans on Verve	18-CD set	Verve
1998	Ultimate Bill Evans	Selected by Herbie Hancock, recorded 1956–71	Verve
1998	Piano Player	From various sessions with various musicians, recorded 1957–71; Includes 6 duos with Eddie Gómez (b)	Columbia
2001	Bill Evans' Finest Hour		Verve
2004	Bill Evans for Lovers	Various sessions and sources	Verve
2004	The Best of Bill Evans	From sessions for the Riverside label, recorded 1956–63	Riverside
2005	Bill Evans and Orchestra: Brandeis Jazz Festival	Works for piano and orchestra conducted by Gunther Schuller and George Russell with 3 bonus Don Elliott quartet recordings, all recorded 1957	Gambit Records
2005	The 1960 Birdland Sessions	Broadcast recordings with Scott LaFaro and Paul Motian	Fresh Sound
2005	The Complete Village Vanguard Recordings, 1961	3-CD box set, recordings with Scott LaFaro and Paul Motian	Riverside
2005	We Will Meet Again - The Bill Evans Anthology	2-CD box set	Warner Bros.
2007	Emergence	Selected early recordings from 1955-56	FiveFour
2007	The Sideman Years	Selected early recordings as a sideman from 1955-57	Fresh Sound
2009	The Complete Tony Bennett/Bill Evans Recordings	2-CD set with alternate takes	Fantasy
2011	The Sesjun Radio Shows	2-CD set of broadcast trio recordings from 1973-1979	Out of the Blue
2012	My Foolish Heart	Compilation of 45 remastered tracks	
2017	Complete Studio & Live Masters	3-CD set of Evans's complete recordings with Miles Davis	One Records [European Union]
2019	Smile With Your Heart: The Best of Bill Evans on Resonance		Resonance
2021	Everybody Still Digs Bill Evans - A Career Retrospective 1956–1980	5-CD box set	Craft
2023	Treasures	2-CD set, previously unreleased solo, trio, and orchestral recordings from Denmark, recorded 1965-69	Elemental Music
2025	Further Ahead: Live in Finland 1964-1969	2-CD set, previously unreleased live trio recordings	Elemental Music

=== As sideman ===
With Jerry Wald

- Jerry Wald and his Orchestra (1953)
- Listen to the Music of Jerry Wald (1955)

With Lucy Reed

- The Singing Reed (1955)

With Dick Garcia

- A Message from Garcia (1955)

With George Russell

- The Jazz Workshop (1956)
- Modern Jazz Concert aka Brandeis Jazz Festival (1957) with orchestra arranged and conducted by Russell & Gunther Schuller
- New York, N.Y. (1959)
- Jazz in the Space Age (1960)

With Tony Scott

- The Touch of Tony Scott (1956)
- The Complete Tony Scott (1956)
- The Modern Art of Jazz (1957)
- Free Blown Jazz (1957)
- My Kind of Jazz (1957)
- Golden Moments (1959)
- I'll Remember (1959)
- Sung Heroes (1959)

With Don Elliot

- Tenderly: An Informal Session (Milestone, 1956–7 [2001])
- Eddie Costa, Mat Mathews & Don Elliott at Newport (Verve, 1957)
- The Mello Sound of Don Elliot (Decca, 1958)

With Joe Puma

- Joe Puma Trio and Quartet (1957)

With Charles Mingus

- East Coasting (Bethlehem, 1957)

With Jimmy Knepper

- A Swinging Introduction to Jimmy Knepper (Bethlehem 1957)

With Sahib Shihab

- Jazz Sahib (Savoy, 1957)

With Idrees Sulieman

- Roots (New Jazz, 1957) with the Prestige All Stars

With Pepper Adams

- The Soul of Jazz Percussion (1960) features 3 tracks by the Donald Byrd-Pepper Adams Sextet with Evans, Paul Chambers, Philly Joe Jones, and Earl Zindars

With Eddie Costa

- Guys and Dolls Like Vibes (1958)

With Helen Merrill

- The Nearness of You (1958)

With Hal McKusick

- Cross Section Saxes (1958)

With Miles Davis

- 1958 Miles (1958)
- Kind of Blue (1959)
- Jazz at the Plaza (1973)
- At Newport 1958 (2001)

With Michel Legrand

- Legrand Jazz (1958)

With Cannonball Adderley

- Portrait of Cannonball (1958)
- Jump for Joy (1958)
- Know What I Mean? (1961)

With Art Farmer

- Modern Art (United Artists, 1958)

With Chet Baker

- Chet Baker Introduces Johnny Pace (Riverside, 1958) [not credited]
- Chet (Riverside, 1959)
- Chet Baker Plays the Best of Lerner and Loewe (Riverside, 1959)

With Bill Potts

- The Jazz Soul of Porgy and Bess (1959)

With Lee Konitz

- Live at the Half Note (Verve, 1959)
- Lee Konitz Meets Jimmy Giuffre (Verve, 1959) with Jimmy Giuffre
- You and Lee (Verve, 1959)

With Warne Marsh

- The Art of Improvising (Revelation, 1959 [1974])

With Manny Albam/Teo Macero

- Something New, Something Blue (1959)

With John Lewis

- Odds Against Tomorrow (1959)
- Jazz Abstractions (1960) – with Gunther Schuller & Jim Hall

With Frank Minion

- The Soft Land of Make Believe (1960)

With Kai Winding

- The Great Kai & J. J. (1960) with J. J. Johnson
- The Incredible Kai Winding Trombones (1960)

With Oliver Nelson

- The Blues and the Abstract Truth (Impulse!, 1961)

With Mark Murphy

- Rah! (1961) - Evans plays only very little on 2 tracks

With Dave Pike

- Pike's Peak (Epic, 1962)

With Tadd Dameron

- The Magic Touch (Tadd Dameron album) (Riverside, 1961)

With Benny Golson

- Pop + Jazz = Swing (Audio Fidelity, 1961) – re-mixed version released as Just Jazz!
