= Momentum (Bill Evans album) =

Live album by Bill Evans
- Released: October 1, 2012
- Recorded: February 4, 1972; Netherlands
- Genre: Jazz
- Length: 1:32:42
- Label: Limetree
- Producers: Maria Rijnders, Rob Rijneke

Bill Evans chronology
The Complete Tony Bennett/Bill Evans Recordings (2009)	Momentum (2012)

Momentum is a live album recorded in 1972 at Groningen, the Netherlands, by American jazz pianist Bill Evans with a trio including Eddie Gómez on bass and Marty Morell on drums.

== Background ==
The album was first professionally recorded at a concert with Bill Evans, Eddie Gomez, and Marty Morell in Groningen, Netherlands, in 1972. But after almost forty years of preservation a second recording of Momentum was released. The name of the album was chosen by Nanette Evans, his widow. She claimed, "At the time of this recording in 1972, Bill was experiencing a momentous upswing in his personal life, his health, and his career," she remembered. "So I would like to give the album the appropriate title of Momentum."

Evans is known for his quiet, reserved, repeated dominant 7th chords that create a scenic effect. Miles Davis describes it as follows: "Bill had this quiet fire that I loved on piano. The way he approached it, the sound he got was like crystal notes or sparkling water cascading down from some clear waterfall. I had to change the way the band sounded again for Bill's style by playing different tunes, softer ones at first."

== Reception ==
Professional ratings
Review scores
Source	Rating
Allmusic	4.5/5 stars

Ken Dryden of Allmusic wrote of the album; "Evans' trio with bassist Eddie Gomez and drummer Marty Morell is in top form throughout this concert, while the repertoire will be familiar to the leader's fans. The pianist is in a reflective mood." Aaron of DownBeat wrote; "The trio drew heavily on an established repertoire of tunes, such as “Emily,” which they extend further than they had four years earlier... It’s thrilling to hear this trio get aggressive: Evans continues in his quiet determination to challenge ideas of where the pulse should be, Gomez sounds authoritatively forceful on 'Emily' and Morell is equally dynamic on 'My Romance.'"

== Track listing ==
=== Disc 1 ===
1. "Re: Person I Knew" (Bill Evans) – 7:59
2. "Elsa" (Earl Zindars) – 7:04
3. "Turn Out the Stars" (Evans) – 5:13
4. "Gloria's Step" (Scott LaFaro) – 9:37
5. "Emily" (Johnny Mandel, Johnny Mercer) – 7:47
6. "Quiet Now" (Denny Zeitlin) – 5:38

=== Disc 2 ===
1. "My Romance" (Richard Rodgers) – 10:24
2. "Sugar Plum" (Evans) – 11:33
3. "The Two Lonely People" (Evans) – 8:12
4. "Who Can I Turn To" (Leslie Bricusse, Anthony Newley) – 7:49
5. "What Are You Doing the Rest of Your Life" (Michel Legrand) – 5:17
6. "Nardis" (Miles Davis) – 6:09

== Personnel ==
- Bill Evans – piano
- Eddie Gomez – bass
- Marty Morell – drums
