= Complete Riverside Recordings =

"The Complete Riverside Recordings" and similar titles usually refer to compilation releases of material recorded by Riverside Records, including:

- Thelonious Monk: The Complete Riverside Recordings by pianist Thelonious Monk
- The Complete 1957 Riverside Recordings by Thelonious Monk and John Coltrane
- Wes Montgomery: The Complete Riverside Recordings by guitarist Wes Montgomery
- Bill Evans: The Complete Riverside Recordings by pianist Bill Evans - see Bill Evans discography#Compilations
- The Freelance Years: The Complete Riverside & Contemporary Recordings by saxophonist Sonny Rollins
