= Intuition (Bill Evans album) =

Studio album by Bill Evans
- Released: July 1975
- Recorded: November 7–10, 1974
- Studio: Fantasy Studios, Berkeley
- Genre: Jazz
- Length: 41:31
- Label: Fantasy; F-9475
- Producer: Helen Keane

Bill Evans chronology
Blue in Green: The Concert in Canada (1974)	Intuition (1975)	The Tony Bennett/Bill Evans Album (1975)

Intuition is a jazz album by pianist Bill Evans and bassist Eddie Gómez released by Fantasy Records in 1975.

== Background ==
The album is one of a series of duo recordings in Evans's discography, along with two albums with guitarist Jim Hall, two with vocalist Tony Bennett, and a live follow-up to this album with Gómez recorded half a year later, Montreux III. According to Evans biographer Peter Pettinger, the pianist "had long cherished an ambition to make a duet album with his colleague," who had been a member of the Bill Evans Trio for more than eight years at the time of this recording.

Keith Shadwick notes that at this time, there were "limited precedents for a piano-and-bass duet record," notably including Duke Ellington's recordings with Jimmy Blanton in 1940 and with Ray Brown in 1972.

On the album, Evans alternates between an acoustic piano and a Fender Rhodes electric piano. Gómez plays acoustic bass throughout.

Pettinger says that Evans himself highly valued this album and that "it became one of the few of his own that he put on at home."

== Repertoire ==
The album includes two Evans originals, "Show-Type Tune," first recorded on the album How My Heart Sings!, and "Are You All the Things," a contrafact based on Jerome Kern's classic "All the Things You Are," which rearranges the words of its title.

The duo also perform Mercer Ellington's "Blue Serge" (first recorded by Duke Ellington in 1941) and two compositions by contemporary composers Evans favored at this time: "A Face Without a Name" by Claus Ogerman, with whom Evans had recorded the album Symbiosis earlier in 1974, and "Falling Grace" by bassist Steve Swallow, whose pieces "Hullo Bolinas," "Eiderdown," and "Peau Douce" Evans also recorded in the '70s. Also included is a brief version of "The Nature of Things" by the obscure jazz pianist Irvin Rochlin.

The program is bookended by two compositions by film composer Bronislaw Kaper, who also wrote the standard "On Green Dolphin Street," which Evans had recorded a number of times, going back to a celebrated 1958 version with Miles Davis. Here, the opener is the "complex" song "Invitation," with its "rangy, serpentine melody." Pettinger describes Evans's performance of it as "a feast of romantic pianism in the line of Chopin and Rachmaninoff." The closer is "Hi Lili, Hi Lo" from the 1953 musical Lili, which Evans subtitled "(For Ellaine)" in memory of his common-law wife, Ellaine Schultz, who had committed suicide the previous year after Evans left her. Shadwick describes Evans's remarkable and unusual performance of the song as follows:

There is a degree of tenderness mixed with regret here that is unusual even by Evans's standards. The halting, haunting arrangement has every verse ending in a pause, after which the key is raised by a fifth and the intensity heightened a notch. Gomez is well aware of what is unfolding before him and sticks to the most elementary accompaniment so as not to distract from the completeness of the performance Evans is constructing. ... [T]his singularly affecting recital is perhaps the highlight of the Intuition album.

Both Kaper pieces and the Ogerman composition are played exclusively on acoustic piano.

== Liner Notes ==
The liner notes to the album were written by the classical conductor George Cleve, who attended the recording sessions. He noted that he knows "most of Bill's previous albums by heart" and that as someone accustomed to performing straight from a printed page, it was a "humbling experience" to hear "the terrifying level of energy and concentration" and "the apparently limitless flow of ideas" involved in the duo's improvisations. Cleve called Gómez "one of the two greatest bass players in the history of jazz" and singled out Ogerman's "A Face Without a Name" as his favorite track on the album, with its "buoyant yet wistful virtuosity with interludes of some of the most harmonically rich and warm playing I've ever heard from Bill."

== Reception ==
Professional ratings
Review scores
Source	Rating
AllMusic	4/5 stars
The Rolling Stone Jazz Record Guide	4/5 stars
The Penguin Guide to Jazz Recordings	3/4 stars

The AllMusic review by Scott Yanow awarded the album 4 stars out of 5, calling it "intuitive and bordering on the telepathic" and saying that "the sensitive and generally introspective playing ... definitely holds one's interest."

In a retrospective piece about the pianist in All About Jazz, Mark Sabbatini says, "Those wanting to hear Evans on electric keyboard might find this their best bet—or at least a safe one—as he alternates between electric and acoustic on this duo collaboration with Gomez. The interaction between the two is superb."

Shadwick comments, "Evans and Gomez had long before resolved the problems of sequence and balance, each being well accustomed to the other's characteristic musical patterns. As with Evans's earlier dialogues with guitarist Jim Hall, there is an intimacy between the two musicians on their duet album that becomes spellbinding once the listener too is absorbed by the mood."

== Reissue ==
The album was reissued on CD by Fantasy Records and Original Jazz Classics in 1990.

== Track listing ==
1. "Invitation" (Bronisław Kaper, Paul Francis Webster) – 6:28
2. "Blue Serge" (Mercer Ellington) – 5:09
3. "Show-Type Tune" (Bill Evans) – 4:08
4. "The Nature of Things" (Irvin Rochlin) – 3:25
5. "Are You All the Things" (Bill Evans) – 5:00
6. "A Face Without a Name" (Claus Ogerman) – 5:37
7. "Falling Grace" (Steve Swallow) – 4:28
8. "Hi Lili, Hi Lo (For Ellaine)" (Bronisław Kaper, Helen Deutsch) – 7:16

== Personnel ==
- Bill Evans - piano, Rhodes
- Eddie Gómez – bass

Production notes

- Helen Keane – producer
- Don Cody – engineer

== Chart positions ==
Year	Chart	Position
1975	Billboard Jazz Albums	33
