= Blue in Green (disambiguation) =

"Blue in Green" is a 1959 jazz ballad by Miles Davis.

Blue in Green may also refer to:

- Blue in Green: The Concert in Canada, a 1991 live album by pianist Bill Evans
- Blue in Green, a 2001 album by jazz singer Tierney Sutton
