= Live in Buenos Aires =

Live in Buenos Aires may refer to:

- Live in Buenos Aires (Coldplay album)
- Live in Buenos Aires 1979, an album by Bill Evans

== See also ==
- That One Night: Live in Buenos Aires, an album by Megadeth
- Certifiable: Live in Buenos Aires, an album and concert video by The Police
