= Montreux III =

1975 live album by Bill Evans

Live album by Bill Evans
- Released: 1976
- Recorded: July 20, 1975
- Genre: Jazz
- Length: 42:18
- Label: Fantasy

Bill Evans chronology
The Tony Bennett/Bill Evans Album (1975)	Montreux III (1976)	Alone (Again) (1977)

Montreux III is a live album by jazz pianist Bill Evans and bassist Eddie Gómez, recorded at the Montreux Jazz Festival in Switzerland in 1975 and released on the Fantasy label.

The album was the third of Evans's Montreux concert recordings to be released, following Montreux II (1970) and the Grammy Award–winning Bill Evans at the Montreux Jazz Festival (1968). It was also a follow-up to the duo recording by the pianist and bassist recorded the previous year, Intuition. As on that earlier album, Evans performs on both acoustic and electric pianos.

== Repertoire ==
The program includes two signature works by pianist-composer John Lewis, "Django" and "Milano," both from 1954. Evans also revisits the ballad-waltz "Elsa" by Earl Zindars, which he had recorded several times previously, originally on the album Explorations, and the Cole Porter song "I Love You," which had served as the opener on his very first LP, New Jazz Conceptions. An important addition to Evans's repertoire here is the song "Minha" by Francis Hime, which would remain in his playlist for the rest of his career and be recorded live on a number of other occasions. This first recording of the song was used by the actress Lily Tomlin as background music in her one-woman show. The closer on the album is "The Summer Knows" by Michel Legrand from the 1971 film Summer of '42. Evans would heavily feature songs by Legrand in his recordings throughout the '70s.

== Reception ==
DownBeat reviewer Chuck Berg noted, "Throughout, the special Evans-Gomez chemistry is at work. Their intertwined exchanges, their ability to elaborate on and extend each other's ideas, and their overall musically supportive empathy form one of the most productive feedback loops in improvised music."

The AllMusic review by Scott Yanow awarded the album 4 stars and stated that "the communication between the two masterful players is quite special."

Evans biographer Keith Shadwick notes, "At Montreux Evans sounds at ease with an audience he knew had come specifically to revel in his own special qualities. ... Legrand's 'The Summer Knows' get an appropriately bittersweet rendering, including some spot-on bowed playing from Gomez."

Professional ratings
Review scores
Source	Rating
AllMusic	4/5 stars
The Rolling Stone Jazz Record Guide	5/5 stars
The Penguin Guide to Jazz Recordings	3/4 stars

== Reissue ==
The album was released on compact disc in 1991 by Fantasy and Original Jazz Classics.

== Track listing ==
1. "Elsa" (Earl Zindars) - 7:28
2. "Milano" (John Lewis) - 4:40
3. "Venutian Rhythm Dance" (Clive Stevens) - 4:27
4. "Django" (Lewis) - 6:08
5. "Minha (All Mine)" (Francis Hime) - 4:11
6. "Driftin'" (Dan Haerle) - 5:12
7. "I Love You" (Cole Porter) - 6:38
8. "The Summer Knows" (Alan Bergman, Marilyn Bergman, Michel Legrand) - 3:24

== Personnel ==
- Bill Evans - piano, electric piano
- Eddie Gómez - bass
