= The Two Lonely People =

Song by Bill Evans,
- Released: 1971
- Genre: Jazz
- Songwriter: Carol Hall

"The Two Lonely People" is a 1971 jazz standard by Bill Evans, with lyrics by Carol Hall. It first appeared on The Bill Evans Album in 1971 and later appeared on the Bill Evans and Stan Getz collaboration album But Beautiful and the Bill Evans and Tony Bennett collaboration album, Together Again. A solo piano rendition is included on some reissues of Alone, and it appears on 3 of the 8 CDs of the Consecration box set (recorded 1980), suggesting that it remained a staple of Evans's live trio repertoire for the rest of his career.

Jazz improv compared it to "classical music or a great ensemble".
