= Piano player =

Piano player may refer to:

- Pianist, who plays the piano
- Piano Player (album), 1998 album featuring jazz pianist Bill Evans
- The Piano Player (Ramsey Lewis album), 1970
- The Piano Player (2002 film), starring Dennis Hopper, Christopher Lambert & Diane Kruger
- The Piano Player (Maksim Mrvica album), 2003
- The Piano Teacher (film) (French: La Pianiste), or The Piano Player, a 2001 film directed by Michael Haneke
- A player piano, or "automatic piano"
