= Piano Player (album) =

Compilation album by Bill Evans
- Released: 1998
- Recorded: June 10, 1956, September 9, 1958, February 6 & 8, 1962, November 23 & 24, 1970 & May 17, 1971
- Genre: Jazz
- Length: 72:10
- Label: Columbia
- Producer: Orrin Keepnews

Bill Evans chronology
Half Moon Bay (1998)	Piano Player (1998)	Homecoming (1999)

Piano Player is a compilation of recordings featuring jazz pianist Bill Evans released in 1998 on the Columbia label.

The album contains a previously unreleased alternate take of the third movement of George Russell's piece "All About Rosie" and a version of "My Funny Valentine" with Miles Davis from Jazz at the Plaza Vol. I, both of which feature extended solos by Evans.

It also includes two selections from the album Pike's Peak with vibraphonist Dave Pike, six previously unreleased duets with bassist Eddie Gómez, and a previously unreleased trio recording of Evans's composition "Fun Ride," recorded during the sessions for The Bill Evans Album.

== Reception ==
The AllMusic review by Scott Yanow awarded the album 4 stars, stating "The pianist's fans will definitely want this consistently enjoyable CD." The All About Jazz review by Douglas Payne states, "As a whole, Piano Player jumps from time periods and groupings more erratically than a typical Bill Evans listener would expect or appreciate. But eight of these songs offer required—and rewarding—listening for fans of the pianist. The remaining three selections are not readily available elsewhere either. Therefore, for now, Piano Player makes for essential Bill Evans listening."

Professional ratings
Review scores
Source	Rating
Allmusic	4/5 stars

== Track listing ==
All compositions by Bill Evans unless otherwise noted

1. "All About Rosie (3rd Section)" (George Russell) - 5:18
2. "My Funny Valentine" (Lorenz Hart, Richard Rodgers) - 10:20
3. "Vierd Blues" (Miles Davis) - 5:58
4. "Bésame Mucho" (Consuelo Velázquez) - 6:53
5. "Mornin' Glory" (Bobbie Gentry) - 6:43
6. "Django" (John Lewis) - 8:08
7. "Waltz for Debby" - 5:13
8. "T.T.T. (Twelve Tone Tune)" - 3:37
9. "Comrade Conrad" - 6:40
10. "Gone with the Wind" (Allie Wrubel, Herb Magidson) - 6:42
11. "Fun Ride" - 6:37

- Recorded in New York City on June 10, 1956 (track 1), September 9, 1958 (track 2), February 6 & 8, 1962 (tracks 3 & 4), November 23, 1970 (track 5), November 24, 1970 (tracks 6–10) and May 17, 1971 (track 11)

== Personnel ==
- Bill Evans - piano, electric piano
- Miles Davis (track 2), Art Farmer (track 1), Louis Mucci (track 1) - trumpet
- Jimmy Knepper - trombone (track 1)
- Jim Buffington - French horn (track 1)
- Robert Di Domenica - flute (track 1)
- John LaPorta - alto saxophone (track 1)
- Hal McKusick - tenor saxophone (track 1)
- Manuel Zegler - bassoon (track 1)
- Teddy Charles - vibes (track 1)
- Margaret Rose - harp (track 1)
- Barry Galbraith - guitar (track 1)
- Joe Benjamin (track 1), Paul Chambers (track 2), Eddie Gómez (tracks 5–11), Herbie Lewis (tracks 3 & 4) – bass
- Jimmy Cobb (track 2), Marty Morell (track 11), Walter Perkins (tracks 3 & 4), Teddy Summer (track 1) – drums
- George Russell - arranger, conductor (track 1)
- Dave Pike - vibraphone (tracks 3 & 4)
