= Jazzhouse =

Live album by Bill Evans
- Released: 1987
- Recorded: November 24, 1969
- Venue: Jazzhus Montmartre in Copenhagen, Denmark
- Genre: Jazz
- Length: 61:43
- Label: Milestone; M 9151
- Producer: Helen Keane

Bill Evans chronology
What's New (1969)	Jazzhouse (1987)	You're Gonna Hear From Me (1969)

Jazzhouse is a live album by jazz pianist Bill Evans with Eddie Gómez and Marty Morell recorded at the Jazzhus Montmartre in Copenhagen in 1969 but not released until the 1980s on the Milestone label. The same concert also produced the album You're Gonna Hear From Me.

== Reception ==
The Allmusic review by Scott Yanow awarded the album 4 stars and states "Evans sounds relaxed and swinging playing his usual repertoire. All of the songs (mostly standards) have been recorded by Evans at other times but the pianist's many fans certainly will not mind hearing these "alternate" versions".

Professional ratings
Review scores
Source	Rating
Allmusic	4/5 stars

== Track listing ==
1. "How Deep Is the Ocean?" (Irving Berlin) - 6:01
2. "How My Heart Sings" (Earl Zindars) - 4:05
3. "Goodbye" (Gordon Jenkins) - 3:52
4. "Autumn Leaves" (Joseph Kosma, Johnny Mercer, Jacques Prévert) - 5:46
5. "California, Here I Come" (Buddy DeSylva, Joseph Meyer) - 3:14
6. "A Sleepin' Bee" (Harold Arlen, Truman Capote) - 4:32
7. "Polka Dots and Moonbeams" (Johnny Burke, Jimmy Van Heusen) - 3:51
8. "Stella by Starlight" (Ned Washington, Victor Young) - 5:46
9. "Five (Theme)" (Bill Evans) - 2:28

- Recorded at the Jazzhus Montmartre in Copenhagen, Denmark on November 24, 1969.

== Personnel ==
- Bill Evans - piano
- Eddie Gómez - bass
- Marty Morell - drums
