= Montreux II =

Live album by Bill Evans
- Released: 1970
- Recorded: June 19 & 20, 1970
- Venue: Montreux Jazz Festival, Montreux, Switzerland
- Genre: Jazz
- Length: 33:13
- Label: CTI
- Producer: Helen Keane

Bill Evans chronology
From Left to Right (1970)	Montreux II (1970)	The Bill Evans Album (1971)

Montreux II is a live album by jazz pianist Bill Evans with Eddie Gómez and Marty Morell, recorded at the Montreux Jazz Festival in Switzerland in 1970 and released on the CTI label. The album was the second of Evans' Montreux concert recordings to be released, following the Grammy Award-winning Bill Evans at the Montreux Jazz Festival (1968).

== Reception ==
The Allmusic review by Ken Dryden awarded the album 3½ stars and stated, "While this is a terrific live performance, there are sound problems, including what sounds like bleeding of the stage monitors into the mix, and there are muddy spots in the recording as well".

Professional ratings
Review scores
Source	Rating
Allmusic	3.5/5 stars
The Rolling Stone Jazz Record Guide	3/5 stars
The Penguin Guide to Jazz Recordings	3/4 stars

== Track listing ==
All compositions by Bill Evans except as indicated

1. Introduction - 1:11
2. "Very Early" - 5:27
3. "Alfie" (Burt Bacharach, Hal David) - 5:30
4. "34 Skidoo" - 6:37
5. "How My Heart Sings" (Earl Zindars) - 4:16
6. "Israel" (John Carisi) - 4:14
7. "I Hear a Rhapsody" (Jack Baker, George Fragos, Dick Gasparre) - 5:54
8. "Peri's Scope" - 6:00

- Recorded at the Montreux Jazz Festival, Casino De Montreux, Switzerland on June 19 & 20, 1970.

== Personnel ==
- Bill Evans - piano
- Eddie Gómez - bass
- Marty Morell - drums
