= Alone (Bill Evans album) =

1970 solo piano album by Bill Evans

Studio album by Bill Evans
- Released: April 1970
- Recorded: September 23, 24, & 30 1968; October 8, 14, & 21, 1968; Webster Hall, New York City
- Genre: Jazz
- Length: 35:07 original LP
- Label: Verve; V6-8792
- Producer: Helen Keane

Bill Evans chronology
Bill Evans at the Montreux Jazz Festival (1968)	Alone (1970)	What's New (1969)

Professional ratings
Review scores
Source	Rating
The Penguin Guide to Jazz Recordings	3/4 stars
DownBeat	5/5 stars

Alone is a solo piano album by jazz musician Bill Evans, recorded in the fall of 1968 for Verve Records, featuring a particularly notable 14+-minute performance of the jazz standard "Never Let Me Go". Evans contributed notes to the album, including the following statement:

Perhaps the hours of greatest pleasure in my life have come about as a result of the capacity of the piano to be in itself a complete expressive musical medium. In retrospect, I think that these countless hours of aloneness with music unified the directive energy of my life. At those times when I have achieved this sense of oneness while playing alone, the many technical or analytic aspects of the music happened of themselves with positive rightness which always served to remind me that to understand music most profoundly one only has to be listening well. Perhaps it is a peculiarity of mine that despite the fact that I am a professional performer, it is true that I have always preferred playing without an audience. This has nothing to do with my desire to communicate or not, but rather I think just a problem of personal self-consciousness which had to be conquered through discipline and concentration. Yet, to know one is truly alone with one’s instrument and music has always been an attractive and conducive situation for me to find my best playing level. Therefore, what I desired to present in a solo piano recording was especially this unique feeling.

== Background ==
Alone was recorded at Webster Hall in the East Village of New York City, during six recording sessions in September and October 1968. A Steinway & Sons concert grand piano model D-274 was chosen by Evans for this recording. Three of the songs Evans included on the album ("Here's That Rainy Day", "A Time for Love", and "On a Clear Day You Can See Forever") had appeared on Clare Fischer's recording Songs for Rainy Day Lovers, which was released the previous year, 1967. Evans would later record Fischer's own "When Autumn Comes" from this same album on his live 1973 recording The Tokyo Concert.

== Release ==
Not issued until April 1970, a year and a half after it was recorded, Alone was Evans's first commercially released single-piano solo album, following in the footsteps of his 1963 Verve recording Conversations with Myself (featuring three pianos overdubbed) and his 1967 Further Conversations with Myself, also on Verve (with two pianos overdubbed). Alone has been reissued in various forms with additional tracks and alternate takes from sessions on September 23 and October 8 and 21.

== Reception ==
In 1971, the album won the Grammy Award for "Best Jazz Performance, Small Group." The award was presented by none other than Duke Ellington and accepted on Evans's behalf by Quincy Jones.

In The History of Jazz, critic Ted Gioia refers to Alone as a "glorious solo album ... with an incomparable exposition of 'Never Let Me Go,'" featuring "subtle shades and gradations, almost a jazz equivalent of Bach's Goldberg Variations, in which the smallest details were shaped with infinite care."

Evans biographer Peter Pettinger writes: "His playing on the album conveyed a feeling of unaffected nobility. ... There was much oscillation between keys a major third apart, except on the supremely paced 'Never Let Me Go,' which built and arched consistently in one tonality and unified mood."

Another Evans biographer, Keith Shadwick, adds: "Because of the absence of all other accompaniment, Evans can be as flexible as he needs to be and takes appropriate advantage. He adopts the simplest of approaches: exposition, improvisation, resolution. He also allows himself complete freedom of invention harmonically, rhythmically, and melodically. ... [T]he resulting power and logic [are] largely due to his certain vision and thorough preparation. ... His inspiration [on 'Never Let Me Go'] is palpable."

== Legacy ==
Of the five songs recorded for the album, all for the first time by Evans and none of them originals, "Midnight Mood" by Joe Zawinul was the only one that remained a regular part of the pianist's repertoire. Various live trio recordings of it exist from the years 1974-75, including on the album Since We Met, and 1979–80.

This performance of "Here's That Rainy Day" by Jimmy Van Heusen was transcribed by Jed Distler and recorded by the French classical pianist Jean-Yves Thibaudet on his album Conversations with Bill Evans (London/Decca, 1997). "Never Let Me Go" became sufficiently associated with Evans that Tierney Sutton included a vocal performance of it on her Evans tribute album, Blue in Green (Telarc, 2001).

The writer Kazuo Ishiguro named his acclaimed 2005 science fiction novel Never Let Me Go after seeing the title on the sleeve of this album.

== Track listing ==
1. "Here's That Rainy Day" (Jimmy Van Heusen, Johnny Burke) – 5:21
2. "A Time for Love" (Johnny Mandel, Paul Francis Webster) – 5:06
3. "Midnight Mood" (Joe Zawinul, Ben Raleigh) – 5:20
4. "On a Clear Day (You Can See Forever)" (Burton Lane, Alan Jay Lerner) – 4:48
5. "Never Let Me Go" (Ray Evans, Jay Livingston) – 14:32

Additional tracks on 1988 CD reissue:

6. "Medley: All the Things You Are/Midnight Mood" (Jerome Kern, Oscar Hammerstein II)/(Joe Zawinul, Ben Raleigh) – 4:11
7. "A Time for Love" (Johnny Mandel, Paul Francis Webster) – 6:56

The 2002 CD reissue includes other alternate takes.

== Personnel ==
- Bill Evans – piano

Technical

- Helen Keane – producer
- Val Valentin – director of engineering
- Roy Hall – engineer
- Sid Maurer – art direction
- Nancy Reiner – cover art
- Mickey Leonard – supervising consultant
