= Monium (album) =

Studio album by Jeremy Steig
- Released: 1974
- Recorded: 1974
- Genre: Jazz
- Length: 47:35
- Label: Columbia; KC 32579
- Producer: Jeremy Steig

Jeremy Steig chronology
Fusion (1972)	Monium (1974)	Temple of Birth (1975)

Monium is an album by American jazz flautist Jeremy Steig released on the Columbia label in 1974.

Professional ratings
Review scores
Source	Rating
Allmusic	3/5 stars

== Track listing ==
All compositions by Eddie Gómez and Jeremy Steig except where noted

1. "Mason Land Express" − 8:03
2. "Bluesdom" − 7:46
3. "Djinn Djinn" (Gómez, Steig, Marty Morrell) − 9:30
4. "Space Maiden" − 3:12
5. "Monium" (Gómez) − 7:50
6. "Dream Passage" − 11:14

== Personnel ==
- Jeremy Steig – flute, bass flute
- Eddie Gómez − bass
- Marty Morell – drums, percussion
- Ray Mantilla − congas, timbales

Technical

- Frank Laico - engineer
- John Hammond - recording supervisor
- Ed Lee - art direction
- Jeremy Steig - cover drawings
- Don Hunstein - photography
