= Mielparque Tokyo =

Multi-purpose facility in Japan

Coordinates: 35.656°N 139.751°E

Mielparque Tōkyo
- メルパルク東京
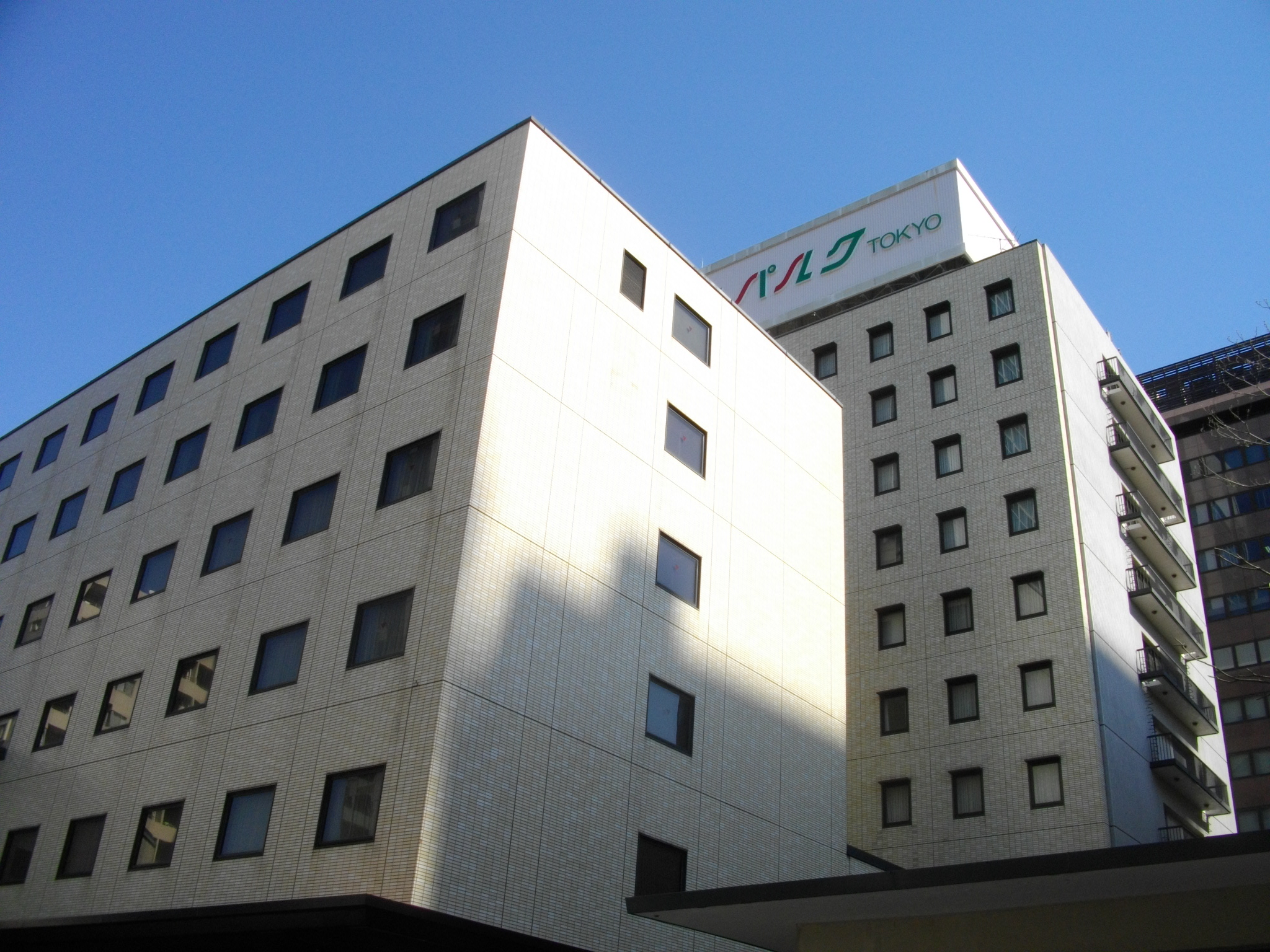
- Mielparque Tōkyo
- Interactive map of Mielparque Tōkyo
- Former names: Tōkyo Yūbin Chokin Kaikan
- Location: Shiba Park, Tōkyo, Japan
- Owner: Japan Post Holdings
- Operator: Mielparque
- Capacity: 1582
- Type: Multi-purpose hall
- Events: Music, Public broadcasting, performing arts

Construction
- Opened: 1 July 1971

Tenant
- Watabe Wedding Corporation

Website
- www.mielparque.jp/tokyo/

Mielparque Tokyo (メルパルク東京, Meruparuku Tōkyō), formerly known as Tokyo Yūbin Chokin Kaikan, is a multi-purpose facility located in Shiba Park, Minato, Tokyo, Japan. It opened in 1971 and was given its current name in 2007. It is one of eleven Mielparque facilities located in Japan. The building contains restaurants, conference facilities, hotel accommodations, and a 1,582-seat multi-purpose event hall which has featured concerts by performers such as Bill Evans, Roy Buchanan, Judas Priest, Robert Plant, Stevie Ray Vaughan, Devo, Motörhead, Hall & Oates, and Art Pepper. It closed on September 30, 2022.
