= The Tokyo Concert =

Live album by Bill Evans
- Released: August 1974
- Recorded: January 20, 1973
- Venue: Yūbin Chokin Hall, Tokyo
- Genre: Jazz
- Length: 56:36
- Label: Fantasy; F-9457
- Producer: Helen Keane

Bill Evans chronology
Living Time (1972)	The Tokyo Concert (1974)	Half Moon Bay (1973)

The Tokyo Concert is a live album by jazz pianist Bill Evans with bassist Eddie Gómez and drummer Marty Morell recorded at the Yūbin Chokin Hall in Tokyo, Japan, in 1973 and released on the Fantasy label.

== Background ==
The album was Evans's first release for Fantasy Records, with whom he would remain until 1977. It was recorded during the last concert of the trio's 1973 tour of Japan, "the first of many in a country that held Evans in the highest esteem." Evans's manager Helen Keane noted:

Everyone seemed to know who Bill was—from bellboys to waiters to giggling girls with autograph books—and, as always, he handled each situation with genuine charm. I think one of the most endearing qualities of Bill's personality was the almost childlike pleasure he got from the star treatment he received wherever he went.

Jazz critic Kiyoshi Koyama found that Evans's playing was different than previously, more fresh and colorful. He—and his aficionados—also noted a change in Evans's clothing: black tuxedo, bright pink shirt; "[r]eportedly, this was the first time he had ever chosen such bold colors."

== Repertoire ==
The album opens with a jazz version of the country song "Mornin' Glory" by Bobbie Gentry, which the group played "straight, capturing and maintaining the tune's ambling spirit." Evans retained this unlikely number in his repertoire to the end.

Also new to his discography were "Up With the Lark" by Jerome Kern, "Yesterday I Heard the Rain" by Armando Manzanero, and "When Autumn Comes" by jazz pianist Clare Fischer. The first two had been performed live the previous year, and the Kern tune became a regular part of the trio's repertoire. The Fischer piece was never recorded by Evans again.

The album notably includes "Hullo Bolinas," a Steve Swallow composition named after a town in California. Gómez had "brought the tune to Bill's attention just before the trio left for Japan." After the trio played it during a public performance, "Morell expressed the opinion that the number would have greater impact without bass and drums." Evans was convinced and played it alone. This piece was his only piano solo of the whole Japanese tour. Later, this performance was transcribed by Jed Distler and recorded by the French classical pianist Jean-Yves Thibaudet on his album Conversations with Bill Evans (1997).

In addition, The Tokyo Concert features versions of the Scott LaFaro tune "Gloria's Step" and two jazz standards long associated with Evans, "My Romance," which he had first recorded as a brief solo on his debut album, New Jazz Conceptions, and "On Green Dolphin Street," which he had first recorded in 1958 with Miles Davis.

Finally, there is one new Evans composition, "T.T.T.T. (Twelve Tone Tune Two)," a sequel to a piece included on The Bill Evans Album that also employs the tone row method of composer Arnold Schoenberg.

== Reception ==
Professional ratings
Review scores
Source	Rating
Allmusic	4/5 stars
The Rolling Stone Jazz Record Guide	5/5 stars
The Penguin Guide to Jazz Recordings	3/4 stars

The AllMusic review by Ken Dryden awarded the album four stars and states, "Although this CD doesn't rank among the Top Five live dates recorded by Bill Evans, it should be considered an essential part of his discography".

Evans biographer Keith Shadwick expressed a high opinion of this recording:

The Tokyo concert reveals the trio functioning at a high level, with each member by this time able to anticipate whatever direction the music might take. Evans plays with restraint and controlled power, his touch superbly caught by the recording engineers, his mood buoyant. Gomez is at a peak. His extravagance of earlier years is more contained and his ideas more fully matured and developed, while his technique is no less forcefully deployed, but now more closely complementing Evans's. His ability to create and carry through a more vocalised approach to the instrument, even at speed, is much improved, and suits Evans better than his approach of the late 1960s.

== Track listing ==
1. "Mornin' Glory" (Bobbie Gentry) – 5:17
2. "Up with the Lark" (Jerome Kern, Leo Robin) – 6:36
3. "Yesterday I Heard the Rain" (Gene Lees, Armando Manzanero) – 6:24
4. "My Romance" (Lorenz Hart, Richard Rodgers) – 8:32
5. "When Autumn Comes" (Clare Fischer) – 5:54
6. "T.T.T.T. (Twelve Tone Tune Two)" (Bill Evans) – 6:22
7. "Hullo Bolinas" (Steve Swallow) – 3:46
8. "Gloria's Step" (Scott LaFaro) – 7:07
9. "On Green Dolphin Street" (Bronisław Kaper, Ned Washington) – 6:38

- Recorded at Yūbin Chokin Hall, Tokyo, Japan, January 20, 1973.

== Personnel ==
- Bill Evans – piano
- Eddie Gómez – bass (except track 7)
- Marty Morell – drums (except track 7)
