= Quiet Now =

Live album by Bill Evans
- Released: 1981
- Recorded: November 28, 1969 Amsterdam, Netherlands
- Genre: Jazz
- Length: 33:10
- Label: Affinity

Bill Evans chronology
Re: Person I Knew (1981)	Quiet Now (1981)	California Here I Come (1982)

Professional ratings
Review scores
Source	Rating
Allmusic	3/5 stars

Quiet Now is an album by jazz pianist Bill Evans, recorded in 1969. It was released in 1981 on the Affinity label. The same recordings were officially released in 2021 in cooperation with the Bill Evans estate as part of the album Behind The Dikes.

In 1999, Polygram issued a compilation titled Quiet Now: Never Let Me Go which, aside from the title track, has a completely different track listing.

== Track listing ==
1. "Very Early" (Evans) - 5:11
2. "A Sleepin' Bee" (Harold Arlen, Truman Capote) - 4:49
3. "Quiet Now" (Denny Zeitlin) - 5:26
4. "Turn Out the Stars" (Evans) - 4:56
5. "Autumn Leaves" (Jacques Prévert, Joseph Kosma, Johnny Mercer) - 4:18
6. "Nardis" (Miles Davis) - 5:48

== Credits ==
- Bill Evans - piano
- Eddie Gómez – bass
- Marty Morell – drums
