= Mezgo =

Studio album by Eddie Gómez
- Released: 1986
- Recorded: November 1985
- Studio: Shinomachi Studios, Tokyo, Japan
- Genre: Jazz
- Length: 38:39
- Label: Epic; C40548
- Producer: Kiyoshi Itoh

Eddie Gómez chronology
Gomez (1984)	Mezgo (1986)	Power Play (1988)

Discovery Cover

Mezgo is an album by bassist Eddie Gómez recorded in Tokyo in 1985 and originally released on the Japanese Epic label the following year before being released worldwide as Discovery on Columbia.

== Reception ==
Professional ratings
Review scores
Source	Rating
AllMusic	4/5 stars

The AllMusic review by Paul Kohler called it "A powerful recording" and stated "Musically this album covers jazz and classical and a little avant-garde".

== Track listing ==
All compositions by Eddie Gómez except where noted

1. "Me Two" (Eddie Gomez, Steve Gadd) – 7:26
2. "Capricious Fantasy" (Gomez, Michael Brecker) – 5:47
3. "Puccini's Walk" – 6:02
4. "Delgado" – 6:35
5. "Caribbean Morning" – 4:12
6. "Scott Davis" – 3:56
7. "Cello Sonata in G Minor: 1st Movement" (Henry Eccles) – 4:41

== Personnel ==
- Eddie Gómez − bass
- Michael Brecker – tenor saxophone, Steinerphone (tracks 1–4)
- Masahiko Satoh − Rhodes piano, synthesizer, piano, arranger (tracks 1, 4, 5 & 7)
- Steve Gadd – drums (tracks 1, 3, 4 & 5)
- Takashi Fukumori, Hiromichi Hara, Yukio Kaneda, Hachiro Ohmatsu, Kiyoshi Ohsawa, Yasuko Seki, Chizuko Tsunoda – violin (track 7)
- Yoshinao Azuma, Hiroshi Watanabe – viola (track 7)
- Hiroto Kawamura, Tomio Yazima – cello (track 7)
- Takashi Katoh – concertmaster (track 7)
- Nobuhiko Nakayama – synthesizer programming
