= But Beautiful (Stan Getz & Bill Evans album) =

Live album by Stan Getz and Bill Evans
- Released: March 1996
- Recorded: August 9 and 16, 1974
- Venue: Singer Concertzaal, Laren, the Netherlands; Jazz Middelheim, Antwerp, Belgium
- Genre: Jazz, modal jazz
- Length: 69:46
- Label: Milestone; MCD 9249-2
- Producer: Helen Keane

Bill Evans chronology
Symbiosis (1974)	But Beautiful (1996)	Blue in Green: The Concert in Canada (1974)

Professional ratings
Review scores
Source	Rating
AllMusic	4/5 stars

But Beautiful is a jazz album by the Bill Evans Trio with Stan Getz, recorded live in Europe in 1974 and released in 1996.

== History ==
Recorded live on August 9, 1974, during the Laren International Jazz Festival at the Singer Concertzaal located in Laren, Netherlands, and on August 16, 1974, during Jazz Middelheim held in Antwerp, Belgium, this record features pianist Bill Evans and tenor saxophonist Stan Getz. It was the second time the two musicians recorded together. Evans doesn't play on "Stan's Blues" since the piece was played off the cuff, on Getz's initiative; clearly peeved, the pianist took his hands off the keyboard after a few chords. On the other hand, during the concert held on August 16, after performing "The Peacocks", Getz wished happy birthday to Evans and played an impromptu "Happy Birthday".

The duo previously released a studio album in 1964. This second record, which consists of the Bill Evans Trio (bassist Eddie Gómez and drummer Marty Morell) and their guest Stan Getz during a 1974 European tour, was actually kept in the vault for 22 years. The album was deemed a "vital reissue" by Billboard magazine. Indeed, the German Jazz Door label had originally released a six-track record from the concert in Antwerp (August 16, 1974). Years later, Milestone acquired the masters and added four tracks from the concert recorded in Laren a week before.

== Track listing ==
1. "Grandfather's Waltz" (Lasse Farnlof, Gene Lees) – 8:05
2. "Stan's Blues" (Gigi Gryce) – 5:49
3. "But Beautiful" (Jimmy Van Heusen, Johnny Burke) – 5:44
4. "Emily" (Johnny Mandel, Johnny Mercer) – 5:40
5. "Lover Man" (James Davis, Roger Ramirez, Jimmy Sherman) – 8:03
6. "Funkallero" (Bill Evans) – 6:36
7. "The Peacocks" (James G. Rowles) – 7:16
8. "You and the Night and the Music" (Arthur Schwartz, Howard Dietz) – 7:38
9. "See-Saw" (Coleman) – 6:43
10. "The Two Lonely People" (Bill Evans, Carol Hall) – 8:12

Tracks 1, 2, 9, 10 recorded on August 9, 1974; tracks 3 to 8 recorded on August 16, 1974.

== Personnel ==
- Bill Evans – piano
- Stan Getz – tenor saxophone (except 9 and 10)
- Eddie Gómez – bass
- Marty Morell – drums
