= Crosscurrents (Bill Evans album) =

Studio album by The Bill Evans Trio, Lee Konitz & Warne Marsh
- Released: 1978
- Recorded: February 28 & March 1–2, 1977
- Studio: Fantasy, Berkeley
- Genre: Jazz
- Length: 34:29 original LP
- Label: Fantasy; F 9568
- Producer: Helen Keane

Bill Evans chronology
Together Again (1976)	Crosscurrents (1978)	I Will Say Goodbye (1977)

Crosscurrents is an album by American jazz pianist Bill Evans, recorded in early 1977 and released in 1978 on Fantasy as F 9568. Along with Evans' trio of Eddie Gómez and Eliot Zigmund, Lee Konitz and Warne Marsh guest on alto and tenor saxophone respectively.

== Reception ==
Professional ratings
Review scores
Source	Rating
AllMusic	4.5/5 stars
The Penguin Guide to Jazz Recordings	3/4 stars
The Rolling Stone Jazz Record Guide	3/5 stars

AllMusic critic Scott Yanow called the album "a superior set" and wrote that "Konitz and Marsh always worked very well together and their cool-toned improvising makes this outing by Bill Evans something special."

== Track listing ==
1. "Eiderdown" (Steve Swallow) – 8:21
2. "Ev'ry Time We Say Goodbye" (Porter) – 3:31
3. "Pensativa" (Clare Fischer) – 5:39
4. "Speak Low" (Nash, Weill) – 6:34
5. "When I Fall in Love" (Heyman, Young) – 4:18
6. "Night and Day" (Porter) – 6:06

Bonus tracks on CD reissue:

7. "Eiderdown" [Take 9] – 5:38
8. "Ev'ry Time We Say Goodbye" [Take 7] – 3:30
9. "Night and Day" [Take 9] – 7:05

== Personnel ==
- Bill Evans – piano
- Lee Konitz – alto saxophone
- Warne Marsh – tenor saxophone
- Eddie Gómez – bass
- Eliot Zigmund – drums

Production

- Helen Keane – producer
- Phil Kaffel – engineer
- Phil DeLancie – digital remastering

== Chart positions ==
Year	Chart	Position
1979	Billboard Jazz Albums	17
