= Mark Kramer (jazz pianist) =

American pianist, composer, producer (born 1945)

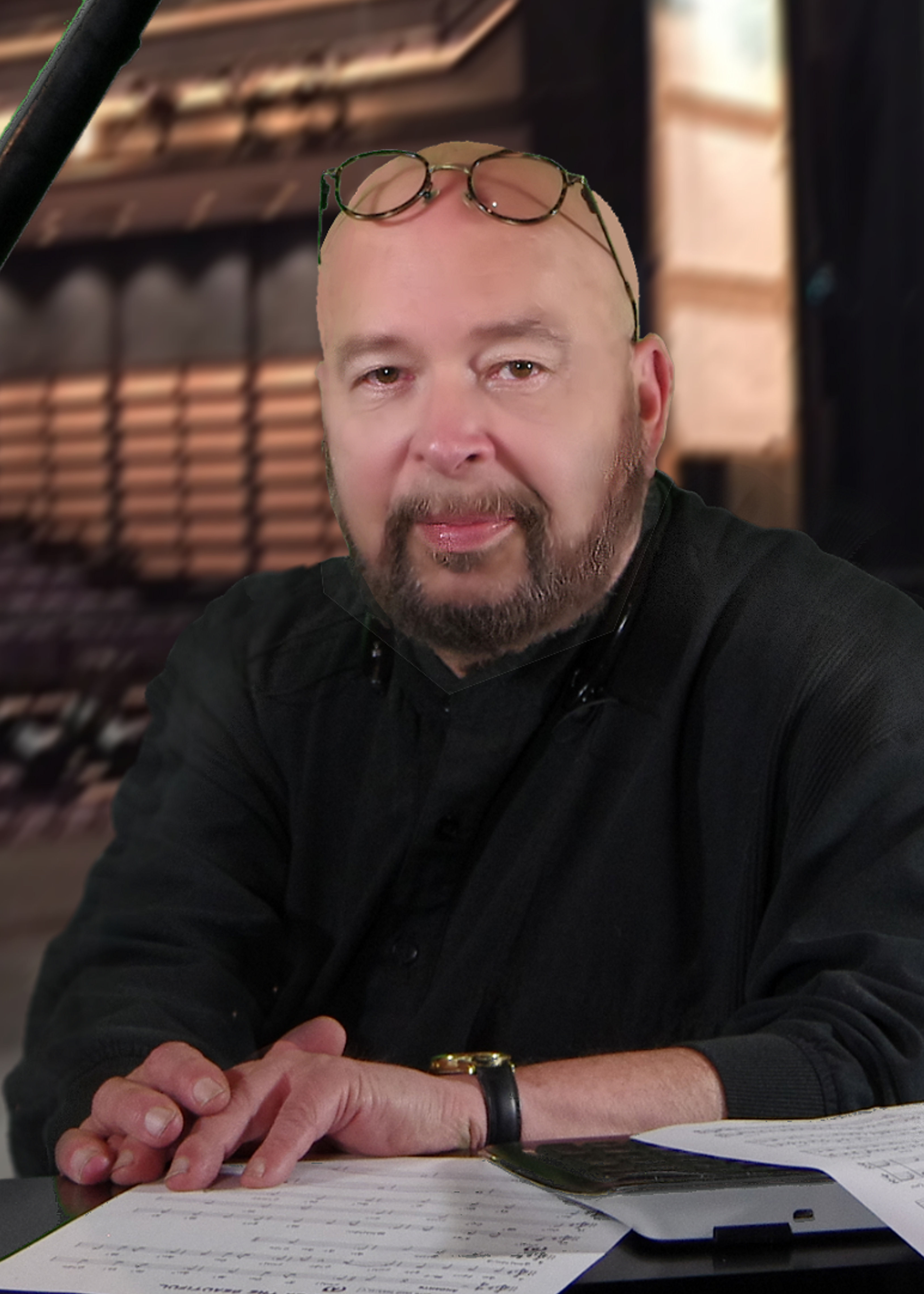
- Mark Kramer performing
- Born: November 3, 1945 (age 81); Philadelphia, Pennsylvania, U.S.
- Occupations: Jazz pianist, composer, neuroscientist, physician
- Years active: 1980–present (music); 1980s–2012 (medicine)
- Known for: Discovery of antidepressant activity of Substance P antagonists; jazz co-productions with Eddie Gómez
- Website: mark-kramer.com

Mark Kramer (born November 3, 1945) is an American jazz pianist, composer, arranger, producer, and former academic and corporate neuroscientist. He is notable for maintaining parallel careers in elite psychopharmacology and professional jazz, similar to physician-musicians such as Denny Zeitlin and Eddie Henderson. In his scientific career, Kramer was a lead clinical researcher at Merck Research Laboratories responsible for the 1998 discovery of the antidepressant activity of Substance P / NK1 antagonists. In music, he has released over 40 albums as a leader or co-leader, frequently collaborating with bassist Eddie Gómez. Members of the Philadelphia Orchestra mentored him on violin from the age of five. His early jazz performances, in his teens and twenties, included those with Michael Brecker and Randy Brecker, Charles Fambrough, Stanley Clarke, and Eric Gravatt.

== Early life ==
Kramer was born in Philadelphia, Pennsylvania. Beginning at age five, he was mentored on violin by members of the Philadelphia Orchestra. In his teens and twenties, he transitioned to jazz piano, performing alongside musicians such as Michael Brecker, Randy Brecker, Charles Fambrough, Stanley Clarke, and Eric Gravatt.

== Medical and scientific career ==
Kramer earned an MD and PhD, ultimately specializing in psychopharmacology. While serving as a senior research physician at Merck Research Laboratories, Kramer posited that the neurokinin Substance P, heavily concentrated in the amygdala, was linked to affective behavior and stress responses rather than just physical pain.

In September 1998, Kramer was the first author of a landmark study published in the journal Science. The clinical trial demonstrated that MK-869, a compound blocking Substance P receptors, produced a robust antidepressant effect. This finding was widely recognized as a novel antidepressant mechanism distinct from traditional monoamine modulation. Following this research, Kramer was photographed at the Karolinska Institute alongside prominent neuropsychopharmacology researchers.

Kramer subsequently served as an adjunct professor in the Department of Psychiatry at the University of Pennsylvania from 2000 to 2012.

== Musical career ==
Kramer is an autodidactic pianist and arranger whose discography spans major and independent labels, including Telarc International, Concord, and Art of Life Records. He has frequently integrated his scientific understanding of attention and perception into his musical approach.

He is widely known for leading the Mark Kramer Trio. Among his notable projects are the largest known body of jazz renditions of complete Broadway shows and film scores, including Evita en Jazz (Telarc), The Sound of Music/Jazz, Rent en Jazz, and a jazz trio reharmonization of Mozart's Symphony No. 40 (Eroica).

Since the late 1980s, Kramer has maintained a significant collaborative partnership with bassist Eddie Gómez. Together, they have co-produced 8 albums, including Art of the Heart (2006) and Jazz Fiddler on the Roof. Kramer also maintained a lifelong musical and personal friendship with the late bassist Charles Fambrough.

In 2025, Kramer collaborated with saxophonist Marco Pignataro on Within the Veil, a strictly acoustic, unscripted duo improvisation. The album conceptually mirrors the spiritual stages outlined in Teresa of Ávila's The Interior Castle.

== Selected discography ==
Kramer's discography includes over 40 releases as a leader.

- Evita en Jazz (Telarc International, 1997)
- Rent en Jazz (Mythic Jazz Records, 1998)
- Jazz Fiddler on the Roof with Eddie Gómez (Twinz, 2002)
- Stonejazz (Lightyear/Warner, 2002) – as sideman
- Harry Potter Jazz (Eroica, 2004)
- Boulders and Mountains with Eddie Gómez (Mythic Jazz / Eroica, 2004)
- Mark Kramer: Kind of Trio with Eddie Gómez and Joe Chambers (Mythic Jazz / Eroica, 2004)
- Art of the Heart with Eddie Gómez (Art of Life, 2004)
- Peace Warrior by Khan Jamal (Random Chance Records, 2004) – as sideman
- Jazz Greetings (Dreambox Media, 2005)
- The Art of Music with Eddie Gómez (Blue Node Records, 2018)
- Within the Veil with Marco Pignataro (2025)
