= You're Gonna Hear from Me (album) =

You're Gonna Hear From Me

Live album by Bill Evans
- Released: 1988
- Recorded: November 24, 1969
- Venue: Jazzhus Montmartre in Copenhagen, Denmark
- Genre: Jazz
- Length: 50:03
- Label: Milestone; M 9164
- Producer: Helen Keane

Bill Evans chronology
Jazzhouse (1969)	You're Gonna Hear From Me (1988)	From Left to Right (1970)

You're Gonna Hear From Me is a live album by jazz pianist Bill Evans with Eddie Gómez and Marty Morell recorded at the Jazzhus Montmartre in Copenhagen in 1969 but not released until 1988 on the Milestone label. The same concert also produced the album Jazzhouse.

== Reception ==
The AllMusic review by Scott Yanow awarded the album 4 stars and states "Evans' regular trio of the time is in exuberant form performing before an enthusiastic crowd... An excellent all-around set".

Professional ratings
Review scores
Source	Rating
AllMusic	4/5 stars
The Penguin Guide to Jazz Recordings	3/4 stars

== Track listing ==
All compositions by Bill Evans except where noted.

1. "You're Gonna Hear From Me" (Dory Previn, André Previn) - 3:02
2. "'Round Midnight" (Thelonious Monk) - 6:22
3. "Waltz for Debby" - 5:29
4. "Nardis" (Miles Davis) - 8:59
5. "Time Remembered" - 5:02
6. "Who Can I Turn To (When Nobody Needs Me)" (Leslie Bricusse, Anthony Newley) - 6:23
7. "Emily" (Johnny Mandel, Johnny Mercer) - 5:01
8. "Love Is Here to Stay" (George Gershwin, Ira Gershwin) - 3:54
9. "Someday My Prince Will Come" (Frank Churchill, Larry Morey) - 5:51

== Personnel ==
- Bill Evans - piano
- Eddie Gómez - bass
- Marty Morell - drums
