= Since We Met =

Live album by The Bill Evans Trio
- Released: 1976
- Recorded: January 11 & 12, 1974
- Genre: Jazz
- Length: 46:12
- Label: Fantasy F 9501
- Producer: Helen Keane and Orrin Keepnews

Bill Evans chronology
Half Moon Bay (1973)	Since We Met (1976)	Re: Person I Knew (1974)

Since We Met is a live album by jazz pianist Bill Evans with Eddie Gómez and Marty Morell, recorded at the Village Vanguard in New York City in 1974 and released on the Fantasy label in 1976. Additional recordings from Evans's 1974 Village Vanguard performances were also issued on the album Re: Person I Knew, released posthumously in 1981. Since We Met was digitally remastered and reissued as a CD in 1991 on Original Jazz Classics.

== Repertoire ==
The album features four compositions by others and three originals, including the first recorded version of the title track, which was dedicated to and named by Evans's wife, Nanette. Two other numbers, "See-Saw" from the 1973 musical of that title and "Sareen Jurer" by Evans's friend Earl Zindars, a composer he frequently covered, were new to his repertoire and intended for this album. Evans soon dropped "See-Saw," but "Sareen Jurer" was performed nightly by the trio for the next few years. The other four compositions had all been recorded previously by Evans and remained in his repertoire to the end.

== Reception ==
The AllMusic review by Scott Yanow awarded the album 4 stars and called it "a good example of Bill Evans' early-'70s trio as it typically sounded in clubs."

Professional ratings
Review scores
Source	Rating
Allmusic	4/5 stars
The Rolling Stone Jazz Record Guide	3/5 stars
The Penguin Guide to Jazz Recordings	3/4 stars

All About Jazz critic Dan McClenaghan placed this album "Near or at the top" among Evans's later career recordings.

The jazz critic and historian Ted Gioia notes that "Evans was a persistent champion of 'But Beautiful,' featuring it with his own trio as well as on all-star collaborations with Tony Bennett and Stan Getz. I especially like the less known version ... from the album Since We Met—Evans's solo here captures a relaxed, conversational way of phrasing, almost as if some private lyrics known only to the pianist are in his mind as he constructs melodic lines to match them."

== Track listing ==
All compositions by Bill Evans except as indicated

1. "Since We Met" - 8:52
2. "Midnight Mood" (Joe Zawinul) - 6:53
3. "See-Saw" (Cy Coleman) - 6:53
4. "Sareen Jurer" (Earl Zindars) - 6:39
5. "Time Remembered" - 5:27
6. "Turn Out the Stars" - 5:07
7. "But Beautiful" (Johnny Burke, Jimmy Van Heusen) - 6:21

- Recorded at the Village Vanguard, New York City on January 11 & 12, 1974.

== Personnel ==
- Bill Evans - piano
- Eddie Gómez - bass
- Marty Morell - drums
- Recorded and remixed by Michael De Lugg
- Mastered by David Turner
- Remastering (1991) - Phil De Lancie
- Liner notes - Max Gordon
- Cover painting - Ron Warwell
