= Never Let Me Go (novel) =

2005 science fiction novel by Kazuo Ishiguro

- First-edition cover
- Author: Kazuo Ishiguro
- Cover artist: Aaron Wilner
- Language: English
- Genre: Science fiction, speculative fiction
- Publisher: Faber and Faber
- Publication date: 2005
- Publication place: United Kingdom
- Media type: Print
- Pages: 288
- ISBN: 1-4000-4339-5 (first edition, hardback)
- OCLC: 56058300
- Dewey Decimal: 823/.914 22
- LC Class: PR6059.S5 N48 2005

Never Let Me Go is a 2005 science fiction novel by the British author Kazuo Ishiguro. It was shortlisted for the 2005 Man Booker Prize, for the 2006 Arthur C. Clarke Award and the 2005 National Book Critics Circle Award. Time magazine named it the best novel of 2005. It included the novel in its '100 Best English-language novels published since 1923—the beginning of TIME'. It also received an ALA Alex Award in 2006. A film adaptation directed by Mark Romanek was released in 2010.

The novel, Ishiguro's sixth, is set in an alternative England of the 1990s and follows students' lives at an elite boarding school. It explores themes of friendship, memory, and what it means to be human.

== Plot ==
Kathy is a 31-year-old carer who has been looking after donors for 11 years, much longer than is typical. Permitted to choose some of the donors she cares for, she elects to support childhood friends. However, she has been notified that her caring role will end soon.

Kathy reminisces about her time at Hailsham, an elite boarding school located in an old country house where students are raised with minimal outside contact. Their guardians (teachers), led by Miss Emily, emphasise the crucial importance of avoiding disease, and the production of expressive art. The students' best pieces are collected by Madame for a mysterious gallery. Much is left unexplained, and the students speculate.

Kathy's schoolfriends include Ruth, a rather bossy girl, and Tommy, an isolated boy with poor artistic skills. Kathy listens often to her cassette tape. Dancing to "Baby, Never Let Me Go" one day, Kathy sees Madame watching her and crying. When Kathy loses the tape, students joke that it has gone to Norfolk, where they half-believe all lost things end up. As the students grow older, Tommy and Ruth start dating.

Near the end of their time at Hailsham, Miss Lucy tells the students that she can no longer hide the truth: they are clones created to donate their vital organs to others upon reaching adulthood, and their futures are predetermined. Miss Lucy is removed from the school.

When the students are 16, they move to the Cottages, a halfway house where they start to explore the outside world. Students move on to begin their training as carers or, if they wish, to start donating. Having learned that they are clones, the students speculate about their originals. After one student spots a possible match for Ruth in Norfolk, a group travel there. On the way, they discuss a rumour that a couple who are truly in love can have their donations deferred for a few years. They find the possible match, but her resemblance to Ruth proves superficial.

Tommy tells Kathy he wants to look for a copy of her lost tape, and together they search local shops for a replacement. Tommy confesses his feelings for Kathy and explains his belief that Madame collects artwork to identify couples who are truly in love, recalling a guardian's comment that students' art reveals their souls. He expresses doubts about getting a deferral, having never produced any good art. When Ruth finds out about the tape and Tommy's belief, she spitefully remarks that even if she and Tommy were to break up, Tommy would never date Kathy because of her sexual history. Kathy applies to become a carer, and does not see Ruth or Tommy for ten years.

Kathy watches as her donors 'complete' (die), almost always after the fourth donation. When she hears that Ruth's first donation has gone badly, Kathy applies to support her. Remorseful for keeping Kathy and Tommy apart, Ruth gives them Madame's address, urging them to seek a deferral.

After Ruth completes, Kathy becomes Tommy's carer and they finally become a couple. They visit Madame's house to attempt to defer Tommy's fourth and final donation, taking new artwork from Tommy to demonstrate that they are genuinely in love. Madame, as well as Miss Emily, who lives with her, are polite, but detached. Miss Emily explains that when clones were first created they were reared in awful conditions, and she had set up Hailsham as a more humane alternative. The students' art was taken to prove to the outside world that students truly had souls. The project was initially a success, but when public opinion turned against it the school was shut down. Miss Emily says that rumours of deferral were false and that many of today's clones are still being raised in deplorable conditions.

Tommy's anger grows, and he asks for a new carer. After Tommy's completion, Kathy drives to Norfolk and stares at a remote fence where windswept litter has collected, imagining this spot to be where everything she had known since childhood has ended up.

== Principal characters ==
- Kathy H. – a 31-year-old clone who was raised to be an organ donor, and the protagonist and narrator of the novel.
- Tommy D. – a childhood friend of Kathy, who is also a donor, uncreative and isolated at school.
- Ruth – a childhood friend of Kathy, also a donor.
- Miss Emily – the head of Hailsham school.
- Miss Lucy – a Hailsham guardian.
- Madame (Marie-Claude) – a regular visitor to Hailsham who collects the students' artwork.

== Background ==
Ishiguro began writing the novel in the 1990s, without a clear idea of his intentions. Initially, the novel was to include a plot involving a nuclear bomb, but then he began to wonder "what the 20th century might have looked like if the incredible developments that took place in nuclear physics, culminating in the creation of the atom and hydrogen bombs, had taken place instead in the field of biology, specifically in cloning". In 2001, listening to a radio broadcast on biotechnology, he decided to focus on "the sadness of the human condition" and "some of the oldest questions in literature […] 'What does it mean to be human?' 'What is the soul?' 'What is the purpose for which we've been created, and should we try to fulfill it?'"

Ishiguro said he found the title "Never Let Me Go" on the sleeve of jazz pianist Bill Evans's album Alone. The song is a jazz standard by composer Jay Livingston and lyricist Ray Evans, which was first performed in the 1956 Michael Curtiz film The Scarlet Hour by Nat King Cole.

== Reception ==
=== Critical reception ===
Louis Menand, in The New Yorker, described the novel as "quasi-science-fiction", saying, "even after the secrets have been revealed, there are still a lot of holes in the story [...] it's because, apparently, genetic science isn't what the book is about". Sarah Kerr, in The New York Times, characterizes the novel's setup as "potentially dime-store-novel" and "an enormous gamble," but elaborates that "the theme of cloning lets [Ishiguro] push to the limit ideas he's nurtured in earlier fiction about memory and the human self; the school's hothouse seclusion makes it an ideal lab for his fascination with cliques, loyalty and friendship."

Horror author Ramsey Campbell labelled it one of the best horror novels since 2000, a "classic instance of a story that's horrifying, precisely because the narrator doesn't think it is".

Joseph O'Neill from The Atlantic suggested that the novel successfully fits into the coming of age genre. O'Neill wrote that "Ishiguro's imagining of the children's misshapen little world is profoundly thoughtful, and their hesitant progression into knowledge of their plight is an extreme and heartbreaking version of the exodus of all children from the innocence in which the benevolent but fraudulent adult world conspires to place them".

Theo Tait for The Daily Telegraph wrote: "Gradually, it dawns on the reader that Never Let Me Go is a parable about mortality. The horribly indoctrinated voices of the Hailsham students who tell each other pathetic little stories to ward off the grisly truth about the future—they belong to us; we've been told that we're all going to die, but we've not really understood".

In Contemporary Literature, Anne Whitehead considered the novel's focus on healthcare to be particularly thought-provoking, with Kathy's status as a carer defining much of her adult life. Whitehead wrote, "[Kathy's] preoccupations with professional success and with minor inconsistencies in the system mean that she is not addressing either her own imminent death or the larger inequities and injustices at work." She wondered, "Is 'caring,' viewed in this light, a form of labor that is socially valuable because Kathy is making a positive difference to others (preventing 'agitation'), or—given the political resonances of Ishiguro's choice of word here—is it a means of preventing resistance and unrest?"

John Mullan said that the novel's modern setting is "calculated to have a defamiliarizing effect. While this novel measures carefully the passing of time, its chronology, we soon realize, is removed from any historical reality that we can recognize".

=== Awards and lists ===
Never Let Me Go was shortlisted for the 2005 Man Booker Prize and for the National Book Critics Circle Awards, where it finished as a finalist in the fiction category. In the same year it won the TIME Magazine award for best book, in the fiction category.

In 2006 it received the ALA Alex Award for young adult books, and in 2007 was nominated for the Dublin Literary Award. In 2019, the novel ranked 4th on The Guardian's list of the 100 best books of the 21st century. In 2021, it was included in The Center For Fiction's 200 Books That Shaped 200 Years of Literature. In 2024, the novel ranked 9th on the New York Times list of its 100 best books of the 21st century.

== Adaptations ==
Mark Romanek directed a 2010 film adaptation of Never Let Me Go starring Carey Mulligan as Kathy, Andrew Garfield as Tommy and Keira Knightley as Ruth. In Japan 2014, the Horipro agency produced a stage adaptation, Watashi wo Hanasanaide (私を離さないで). In 2016, under the same title, Tokyo Broadcasting System Television aired a TV drama adaptation set in Japan starring Haruka Ayase as Kyoko Hoshina and Haruma Miura as Tomohiko Doi. A stage adaptation in English by Suzanne Heathcote was presented at the Rose Theatre Kingston in September 2024 and subsequently at other theatres in England.

In October 2022, FX ordered a television series adaptation to star Viola Prettejohn, Tracey Ullman and Kelly Macdonald. It would be produced by DNA Films, Searchlight Television and FX Productions to air on Hulu and Disney+. In February 2023, it was reported the project was not moving forward.
