= Eloquence (Bill Evans album) =

Studio album by Bill Evans and Eddie Gomez
- Released: 1982
- Recorded: November 19, 1973 – December 18, 1975; Hollywood, Berkeley, Montreux
- Genre: Jazz
- Length: 40:45
- Label: Fantasy; F-9618
- Producer: Helen Keane, Orrin Keepnews

Bill Evans chronology
California Here I Come (1982)	Eloquence (1982)	Loose Blues (1983)

Professional ratings
Review scores
Source	Rating
Allmusic	2.5/5 stars
The Penguin Guide to Jazz Recordings	3/4 stars

Eloquence is an album composed of songs played by jazz musicians Bill Evans and Eddie Gomez between the years of 1973 and 1975. It was released posthumously in 1982 on Fantasy Records.

== Background and reception ==
The album consists of four duets with Eddie Gomez and four solo pieces. Four songs ("Gone With The Wind", "Saudade Do Brasil", "All Of You" and "Since We Met") and the medley ("But Not For Me" / "Isn't It Romantic" / "The Opener") were recorded while rehearsing in the Fantasy Records studio in Berkeley in 1974–75. The last piece is a brief medley of two Cy Coleman tunes: "When In Rome" and "It Amazes Me". They were recorded live in 1973 at one of Evans's favorite West Coast venues, Shelly's Manne-Hole jazz club in Hollywood. The remaining songs, "In A Sentimental Mood" and "But Beautiful" were recorded live at the Montreux Jazz Festival in 1975.

Scott Yanow wrote of the album: "Being a musical perfectionist, it is a bit doubtful if he would have wanted this music to be released although longtime Bill Evans collectors will find the explorations to be intriguing" According to the French jazz critic Alain Gerber, in "Saudade Do Brasil", Gomez used "new technical advances in amplification to exploit the upper range and harmonics" of the double bass.

== Track listing ==
1. "Gone With the Wind" (Herbert Magidson, Allie Wrubel) – 5:33
2. "Saudade Do Brasil" (Antônio Carlos Jobim) - 5:45
3. "In a Sentimental Mood" (Duke Ellington, Manny Kurtz, Irving Mills) – 6:09
4. "But Beautiful" (Johnny Burke, Jimmy Van Heusen) - 3:42
5. "All of You" (Cole Porter) - 4:58
6. "Since We Met" (Bill Evans) - 3:41
7. "Medley: "But Not for Me" (George Gershwin, Ira Gershwin) / "Isn't It Romantic?" (Richard Rodgers), Lorenz Hart / "The Opener" (Bill Evans) – 5:09
8. Medley: "When in Rome" / "It Amazes Me" (Cy Coleman) - 5:52

== Personnel ==
- Bill Evans - piano, electric piano
- Eddie Gomez - bass
