= Symbiosis (Bill Evans album) =

Studio album by Bill Evans
- Released: 1974
- Recorded: February 11, 12 & 14, 1974
- Genre: Jazz
- Length: 40:53
- Label: MPS
- Producer: Helen Keane

Bill Evans chronology
Re: Person I Knew (1974)	Symbiosis (1974)	But Beautiful (1974)

Symbiosis is an album by jazz pianist Bill Evans with an orchestra playing a two-movement work composed by conductor Claus Ogerman, recorded in February 1974 and originally released on the German MPS label.

It was the third orchestral album by Evans and Ogerman, following Plays the Theme from The V.I.P.s and Other Great Songs (1963) and Bill Evans Trio with Symphony Orchestra (1966), which mostly consisted of relatively brief arrangements of works by other composers, modern and classical.

Ogerman said that his composition is divided into two "entirely opposed night pieces." He described them as follows:

The tranquillo of the second movement (largo) releases the inner tension of the first. However, both movements share one joint foundation. The second movement is almost in its entirety a (slowed-down) repeat of a fast 41-bar 16th-note woodwind/saxophone passage of the first movement. ... This transfiguration is preceded by two new largo themes for piano and accompanying orchestra. The piano concludes the piece by establishing once more the D-Major theme of the first largo.

The work's two movements are divided into subsections (a, b, and c for the first movement and a and b for the second). Evans plays a Steinway grand piano on the first part of the first movement and the whole second movement but switches to a Fender-Rhodes electric piano for the last two sections of the first movement.

Ogerman praised Evans's performance of his work, saying that the pianist "is—as no other player—able to create within any degree of musical tension. His elimination of everything unnecessary and a rare sensitivity confirm again that he's with no doubt the most distinguished jazz pianist of our time. ... I am unable to envision the piece being played by anyone else but Bill."

Evans recorded the composition with his regular trio at the time, consisting of Eddie Gómez on bass and Marty Morell on drums. The orchestra included some notable jazz players such as Phil Woods and Jerry Dodgion on alto saxophones.

== Reception ==
Professional ratings
Review scores
Source	Rating
AllMusic	3/5 stars
The Rolling Stone Jazz Record Guide	4/5 stars

Evans sent a copy of the album to his friend the famous Canadian classical pianist Glenn Gould, who later wrote to Ogerman:

I have to tell you what a fantastic construction it is, and what a tremendous impression it has made on me. Symbiosis is very much my kind of music. I find your harmonic invention quite staggering, and recently, indeed, I've been listening to the work almost obsessively. As a matter of fact, I have included it in a CBC [Canadian Broadcasting Corporation] program which I am guest hosting this summer and which will include only works that, in one way or another, have had a particular influence upon me over the years.

The AllMusic review awarded the album 3 stars, saying that it "runs the stylistic gamut: there are moments of Philip Glass-like minimalism (!), samba-flavored big-band passages, echoes of the early 20th century Russian composers, Third Stream jazz, lush yet slightly ominous string arrangements and '70s film music. Throughout, Evans, alternating between acoustic and electric pianos, shimmers and entrances with his inventively lyrical solos. Not your 'typical' Bill Evans album—but that's what makes SYMBIOSIS such a fine, gently challenging listen."

Evans biographer Keith Shadwick says, "This new session is as fascinating for the logical development in Ogerman's writing as for the superb response from Evans and his trio. ... Evans brings to the work the consummate artistry and sensitivity that occurs when he is stretched and stimulated. His rubato playing in the opening of the second movement—sometimes alone, sometimes in perfect unison with strings—is both moving and immensely accomplished in a way that few other jazz or classical pianists could have countenanced. ... Additionally, Evans brings to the interpretation of his written part here a freedom and license that [are] quite simply beyond concert pianists working in the classical tradition. ... It is one of his finest achievements within the confines of a recording studio."

== Reissues ==
The album was released on compact disc by Verve Records in 1994 and reissued in 1999 as part of "The Verve Collection." MPS Records released a new CD edition in 2016.

== Legacy ==
In February 1975, Evans gave a broadcast performance of Symbiosis in the Netherlands with the Metropole Orchestra conducted by Dolf van der Linden.

Portions of the second movement of the piece were used in the soundtracks of the 2004 film Sideways and the 2021 film Judas and the Black Messiah.

== Track listing ==
All compositions by Claus Ogerman

1. "Symbiosis 1st Movement (Moderato, Various Tempi) - 24:58
2. "Symbiosis 2nd Movement (Largo - Andante - Maestoso - Largo) - 15:55

- Recorded in New York City on February 11, 12 & 14, 1974.

== Personnel ==
- Bill Evans - piano and electric piano
- Eddie Gómez - bass
- Marty Morell - drums
- Claus Ogerman - composer and conductor
- Bernie Glow, Marky Markowitz, Victor Paz, Marvin Stamm, Mel Davis, Johnny Frosk - trumpet
- Urbie Green, Paul Faulise, Tom Mitchell - trombone
- Ray Alonge, Jim Buffington, Earl Chapin, Peter Gordon, Al Richmond, Gruce Tilotson - French horn
- Don Butterfield - tuba
- Hubert Laws, Don Hammond, Bill Stapin - flute
- Phil Bodner, George Marge - oboe
- Wally Kane, Don McCourt - bassoon
- Danny Bank, Ron Janelly - clarinet
- Phil Woods, Jerry Dodgion, Harvey Estrin, Walt Levinsky - saxophones
- Doug Allan, Dave Carey, George Devens, Ralph MacDonald - percussion
- David Nadien - concertmaster
