= The Bill Evans Album =

Studio album by Bill Evans
- Released: End of August/early September 1971
- Recorded: May 11–12, 17, 19–20 and June 9, 1971
- Studios: CBS 30th Street Studio, New York City
- Genre: Jazz
- Length: 70:27
- Labels: Columbia; C 30855
- Producer: Helen Keane

Bill Evans chronology
| From Left to Right (1970) | The Bill Evans Album (1971) | Living Time (1972) |

Professional ratings
Review scores
| Source | Rating |
|---|---|
| AllMusic | link |
| The Rolling Stone Jazz Record Guide | 4/5 stars |
| The Penguin Guide to Jazz Recordings | 2.5/4 stars |

The Bill Evans Album is a recording by the jazz pianist Bill Evans, released in 1971 on the Columbia label. It was his first album to feature all compositions written (or co-written), arranged, and performed by him. On the record, Evans plays both an acoustic and a Fender Rhodes electric piano.

Of the album's seven compositions, four were new for this project: "The Two Lonely People," "Sugar Plum," "T.T.T. (Twelve Tone Tune)," and "Comrade Conrad." Of these, "The Two Lonely People" would become a regular part of the pianist's performing repertoire and was recorded many times. "T.T.T." is a tone row composition, employing the serial technique of composer Arnold Schoenberg; however, Evans "clothe[d] the line with diatonic harmony" and believed that twelve-tone music "was incompatible with the art of improvising."

The title of the song "Re: Person I Knew" (recorded first on his 1962 Moon Beams album) is an anagram of the name of Evans's producer at Riverside Records, Orrin Keepnews. The lineup of Evans originals is rounded out by two of his best-known compositions, "Funkallero," which although previously recorded by the pianist on several occasions was first released here, and "Waltz for Debby."

A recording of Evans's composition "Fun Ride" was also made during these sessions and later collected on the compilation Piano Player (1998).

The Bill Evans Album was reissued, with three bonus alternative tracks, by Sony in 2005.

The cover image is based on a photograph taken by music photographer Don Hunstein.

== Reception ==
At the Grammy Awards of 1972, the album won the Grammy Award for Best Jazz Instrumental Solo and the Best Jazz Performance by a Group awards.

AllMusic reviewer Scott Yanow gave the album 4 stars, writing, "Although not as distinctive on the electric keyboard as he was on its acoustic counterpart, Evans sounds inspired by its possibilities and is heard in top creative form throughout the date."

Evans biographer Peter Pettinger wrote that the album "was an enterprise of diligence and serious intent, though the musicians were still enjoying themselves, as the frequent foot-tapping testifies; tempi were held steady and the material was challenging to players and listeners alike."

== Track listing ==
All songs by Bill Evans except where noted.

1. "Funkallero" (album version) – 7:45
2. "The Two Lonely People" (Bill Evans, Carol Hall) – 6:10
3. "Sugar Plum" (album version) – 7:02
4. "Waltz for Debby" (Evans, Gene Lees) – 7:41
5. "T.T.T. (Twelve Tone Tune)" – 6:38
6. "Re: Person I Knew" – 5:52
7. "Comrade Conrad" (album version) – 7:34
  2005 reissue bonus tracks:
8. "Waltz for Debby" [alternate take] (Evans, Gene Lees) – 7:47
9. "Re: Person I Knew" [alternate take] – 7:16
10. "Funkallero" [alternate take] – 6:09

== Personnel ==
- Bill Evans – piano, Fender Rhodes
- Eddie Gómez – bass
- Marty Morell – drums

Production

- Helen Keane – producer
- Peter Weiss – engineer, mixing
- Orrin Keepnews – reissue producer
- Mark Wilder – remastering
- John Berg – art direction
- Fred Binkley – liner notes
- Don Hunstein – photography
- Seth Rothstein – project director
- Paula Wood – art direction, design

== Charts ==
| Year | Chart | Position |
|---|---|---|
| 1971 | Billboard Jazz Albums | 14 |
