= The Complete 1957 Riverside Recordings =

Compilation album by Thelonious Monk and John Coltrane
- Released: June 27, 2006
- Genre: Hard bop
- Length: 52:18 & 53:35
- Label: Riverside

Professional ratings
Review scores
Source	Rating
AllMusic	3.5/5 stars
PopMatters	6/10 stars

The Complete 1957 Riverside Recordings is a 2006 release of Thelonious Monk and John Coltrane's work for the Riverside Records label in 1957, with two tracks previously unreleased.

This collection is an almost complete anthology of the work of Monk and Coltrane, who only recorded together in the studio during 1957. The set draws from tracks recorded for Thelonious Monk with John Coltrane, Monk's Music and a trio track from Thelonious Himself.

Thelonious Monk Quartet with John Coltrane at Carnegie Hall and Live at the Five Spot: Discovery! are the only other recordings documenting Monk and Coltrane's work together.

== Track listing ==
=== CD 1 ===
1. "Monk's Mood (False start)" (Monk) – 0:55
2. "Monk's Mood" (Monk) – 7:52
3. "Crepuscule with Nellie (Take 1)" (Monk) – 4:34
4. "Crepuscule with Nellie (Take 2)" (Monk) – 4:42
5. "Crepuscule with Nellie (Breakdown)" (Monk) – 0:55
6. "Blues for Tomorrow" (Gigi Gryce) – 13:33
7. "Crepuscule with Nellie (Edited, retakes 4 & 5)" (Monk) – 4:46
8. "Crepuscule with Nellie (Retake 6)" (Monk) – 4:39
9. "Off Minor (Take 4)" (Monk) – 5:15
10. "Off Minor (Take 5)" (Monk) – 5:07

=== CD 2 ===
1. "Abide with Me (Take 1)" (William Henry Monk) – 0:54
2. "Abide with Me (Take 2)" (William Henry Monk) – 0:54
3. "Epistrophy (Short)" (Monk, Kenny Clarke) – 3:09
4. "Epistrophy" (Monk, Kenny Clarke) – 10:46
5. "Well, You Needn't (Opening)" (Monk) – 1:26
6. "Well You Needn't" (Monk) – 11:23
7. "Ruby, My Dear (Hawkins)" (Monk) – 5:25
8. "Ruby, My Dear (Trane)" (Monk) – 6:21
9. "Nutty" (Monk) – 6:38
10. "Trinkle, Tinkle" (Monk) – 6:39

== Personnel ==
- Thelonious Monk - piano
- John Coltrane - tenor saxophone
- Coleman Hawkins - tenor saxophone
- Gigi Gryce - alto saxophone
- Ray Copeland - trumpet
- Wilbur Ware - upright bass
- Art Blakey - drums
- Shadow Wilson - drums
