= From Left to Right =

Studio album by Bill Evans
- Released: January/February 1971
- Recorded: October 14 & 21, November 13, 1969, March 26 & 28, April 23 & 29, May 1 & 20, 1970; San Francisco, CA
- Genre: Jazz
- Label: MGM

Bill Evans chronology
| You're Gonna Hear from Me (1969) | From Left to Right (1971) | Montreux II (1970) |

Professional ratings
Review scores
| Source | Rating |
|---|---|
| Allmusic | 2/5 stars |
| The Penguin Guide to Jazz Recordings | 3/4 stars |

From Left to Right is an album by American jazz pianist Bill Evans, released in 1971. It was recorded with his regular bassist Eddie Gómez and drummer Marty Morell and with an orchestra arranged and conducted by Michael Leonard. This was the first album on which Evans played a Fender Rhodes electric piano.

The recording includes two compositions by Evans's friend Earl Zindars and a new Michel Legrand tune, "What Are You Doing the Rest of Your Life?," which "became a favorite of the trio's after this recording."

Evans biographer Peter Pettinger noted, "The aim of From Left to Right was far removed from the continuing work of the trio. This album and the earlier The V.I.P.s [with Claus Ogerman] are the only Bill Evans records to be filed appropriately under 'easy listening' at your local record store."

== Reissues ==
- From Left to Right was reissued on CD by Verve Records on November 13, 1998 with bonus tracks.
- From Left to Right was reissued on CD by Universal in 2005 with the same bonus tracks as the 1998 release.

== Track listing ==
1. "What Are You Doing the Rest of Your Life?" (Alan Bergman, Marilyn Bergman, Michel Legrand) – 4:05
2. "I'm All Smiles" (Michael Leonard, Herbert Martin) – 5:42
3. "Why Did I Choose You?" (Leonard, Martin) – 5:04
4. "Soirée" (Earl Zindars) – 3:24
5. "The Dolphin-Before" (Luíz Eça) – 3:05
6. "The Dolphin-After" (Luíz Eça) – 3:06
7. "Lullaby for Helene" (Earl Zindars) – 2:50
8. "Like Someone in Love" (Johnny Burke, Jimmy Van Heusen) – 5:38
9. "Children's Play Song" (Evans) – 4:11
  Bonus tracks:
10. "What Are You Doing the Rest of Your Life?" (Bergman, Bergman, Legrand) – 4:44
11. "Why Did I Choose You?" (Leonard, Martin) – 4:18
12. "Soirée" [alternate take] (Earl Zindars) – 3:26
13. "Lullaby for Helene" (Earl Zindars) – 2:39

== Personnel ==
- Bill Evans – Steinway grand piano, Fender-Rhodes electric piano
- Eddie Gómez – bass
- Marty Morell – drums
- Sam Brown – guitar
- Michael Leonard – conductor, arranger
- Unidentified brass, woodwinds and strings
