= Half Moon Bay (album) =

Live album by Bill Evans
- Released: 1998
- Recorded: November 4, 1973
- Genre: Jazz
- Length: 37:38
- Label: Milestone
- Producer: Eric Miller

Bill Evans chronology
The Tokyo Concert (1973)	Half Moon Bay (1998)	Since We Met (1974)

Half Moon Bay is a live album by jazz pianist Bill Evans with Eddie Gómez and Marty Morell recorded at the Bach Dancing and Dynamite Society, in Half Moon Bay, California in 1973 and released on the Milestone label in 1998.

== Reception ==
The Allmusic review by Richard S. Ginell awarded the album 4 stars and called it "some of the better live work from Evans during this period of his life". The All About Jazz review by Douglas Payne stated "Well recorded and produced, Half Moon Bay is a welcome addition to the burgeoning Bill Evans catalog and presents a compelling argument for the notability of this trio, featuring bassist Eddie Gomez, as one of the pianist's three best. Recommended".

Professional ratings
Review scores
Source	Rating
Allmusic	4/5 stars
The Penguin Guide to Jazz Recordings	3/4 stars

== Track listing ==
All compositions by Bill Evans except as indicated

1. Introductions - 0:41
2. "Waltz for Debby" - 6:25
3. "Time Remembered" - 5:46
4. "Very Early" - 6:05
5. "Autumn Leaves" (Joseph Kosma, Jacques Prévert, Johnny Mercer) - 4:47
6. "What Are You Doing the Rest of Your Life?" (Alan and Marilyn Bergman, Michel Legrand) - 5:17
7. "Quiet Now" (Denny Zeitlin) - 5:12
8. "Who Can I Turn To (When Nobody Needs Me)" (Leslie Bricusse, Anthony Newley) - 6:35
9. "How My Heart Sings" (Earl Zindars) - 4:47
10. "Someday My Prince Will Come" (Frank Churchill, Larry Morey) - 6:59

- Recorded at Pete Douglas' Bach Dancing and Dynamite Society, in Half Moon Bay, CA on November 4, 1973.

== Personnel ==
- Bill Evans - piano
- Eddie Gómez - bass
- Marty Morell - drums

Technical

- Pat Britt - executive producer
- Pete Douglas - engineer
- Jamie Putnam - album design
