= Live in Buenos Aires 1979 =

Live album by Bill Evans
- Released: 1989
- Recorded: September 27, 1979
- Genre: Jazz
- Label: Yellow Note

Bill Evans chronology
The Solo Sessions, Vol. 1 (1990)	Live in Buenos Aires 1979 (1989)	Blue in Green: The Concert in Canada (1991)

Live in Buenos Aires 1979 is an album by jazz pianist Bill Evans with Marc Johnson and Joe LaBarbera recorded in concert at the Teatro General San Martín, Buenos Aires in 1979 and released a decade later.

== Music and recording ==
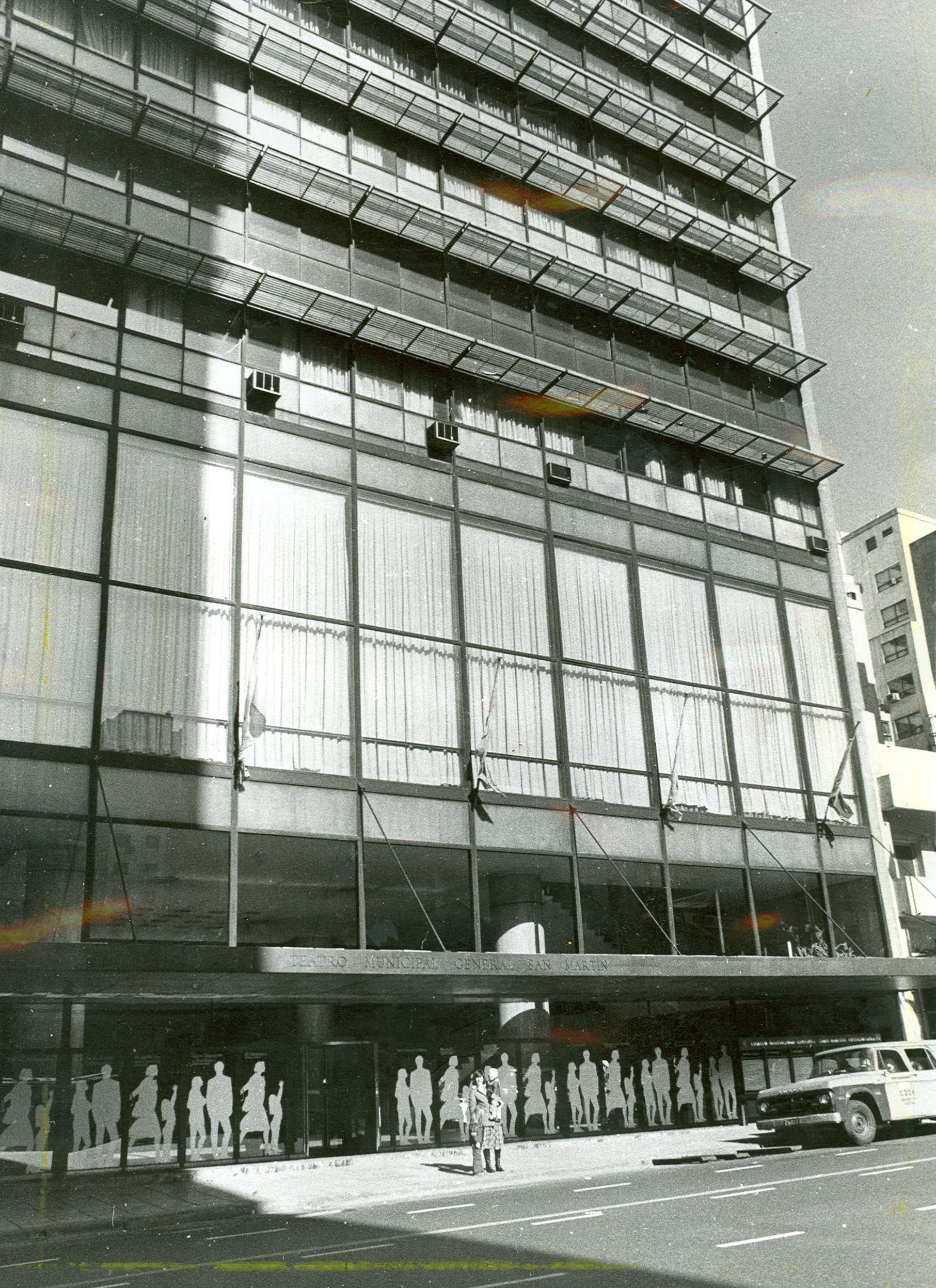
The San Martín Municipal Theater, at around the time of the Bill Evans concert.

Live in Buenos Aires 1979 was recorded during the final year of this trio touring. The recording was unofficial. The second half of the concert began with a solo Evans performance of a new composition dedicated to his son – "Letter to Evan".

== Release and reception ==
Professional ratings
Review scores
Source	Rating
AllMusic	4/5 stars

Live in Buenos Aires 1979 was first released by Yellow Note as a two-LP set in 1989 and was later issued as a double CD.

The AllMusic reviewer of the CD release commented on surface noise on some of the tracks, but concluded that it was "Well worth acquiring". An Evans biographer described the trio album as "an especially magnificent example of their art."

== Track listing ==
1. "Stella By Starlight" - 7:06
2. "Laurie" - 7:55
3. "Theme From Mash" - 4:26
4. "Turn Out the Stars" - 5:29
5. "I Do It For Your Love" - 6:17
6. "My Romance" - 7:04
7. "Letter To Evan" - 4:24
8. "I Love You Porgy" - 7:07
9. "Up With The Lark" - 6:49
10. "Minha" - 3:52
11. "Some Day My Prince Will Come" - 6:20
12. If You Could See Me Now - 6:08
13. Nardis - 16:45

== Personnel ==
- Bill Evans – piano
- Marc Johnson – double bass
- Joe LaBarbera – drums
