= Autumn Leaves (Bill Evans album) =

Live album by Bill Evans with Eddie Gómez and Marty Morell
- Released: 1980
- Recorded: Live in Pescara, Italy 1969
- Genre: Jazz
- Length: 36:09
- Label: Lotus

Autumn Leaves is a 1980 album by Bill Evans with Eddie Gómez on bass and Marty Morell on drums. It was released by Lotus, an Italian record label.

== Track listing ==
No.	Title	Length
1.	"Emily"	5:54
2.	"There Will Never Be Another You"	4:50
3.	"Stairway to the Stars"	5:10
4.	"Someday My Prince Will Come"	5:50
5.	"Blue in Green"	4:45
6.	"'Round About Midnight"	6:45
7.	"Autumn Leaves"	4:55
