= What's New (Bill Evans album) =

Studio album by Bill Evans with Jeremy Steig
- Released: 1969
- Recorded: January 30, February 3 & 5 and March 11, 1969
- Studio: Webster Hall, New York City, NY
- Genre: Jazz
- Length: 44:22
- Label: Verve; V6-8777
- Producer: Helen Keane

Bill Evans chronology
Bill Evans Alone (1968)	What's New (1969)	Jazzhouse (1969)

Jeremy Steig chronology
Jeremy & The Satyrs (1968)	What's New (1969)	This Is Jeremy Steig (1969)

What's New is an album by jazz pianist Bill Evans with flautist Jeremy Steig which was released in 1969 on the Verve label.

== Reception ==
Professional ratings
Review scores
Source	Rating
Allmusic	4/5 stars
DownBeat	3.5/5 stars
The Village Voice	B

Allmusic's Scott Yanow said: "this is a quartet set with guest flutist Jeremy Steig, whose playing recalls Herbie Mann's recording (Nirvana) with Evans back in the early '60s. Both flutists were always open to the influences of pop and rock, although in both of their collaborations with Evans, the music is very much on the pianist's turf".

== Track listing ==
1. "Straight, No Chaser" (Thelonious Monk) – 5:40
2. "Lover Man" (Jimmy Davis, James Sherman, Roger Ramirez) – 6:19
3. "What's New?" (Bob Haggart, Johnny Burke) – 4:50
4. "Autumn Leaves" (Jacques Prévert, Joseph Kosma, Johnny Mercer) – 6:12
5. "Time Out for Chris" (Bill Evans) – 7:17
6. "Spartacus Love Theme" (Alex North) – 4:58
7. "So What" (Miles Davis) – 9:06

== Personnel ==
- Bill Evans − piano
- Jeremy Steig − flute
- Eddie Gómez − bass
- Marty Morell − drums
