= Re: Person I Knew =

Live album by Bill Evans
- Released: 1981
- Recorded: January 11–12, 1974
- Genre: Jazz
- Length: 41:11
- Label: Fantasy
- Producer: Helen Keane, Orrin Keepnews

Bill Evans chronology
Since We Met (1974)	Re: Person I Knew (1981)	Symbiosis (1974)

Re: Person I Knew is a live album by jazz pianist Bill Evans with Eddie Gómez and Marty Morell recorded at the Village Vanguard in New York City in 1974 and released on the Fantasy label in 1981. Additional recordings from Evans' 1974 Village Vanguard performances were also issued on the album Since We Met (1974). The name of the album (and its title-track) is an anagram on the name of Orrin Keepnews, who produced for Evans while he was signed with Riverside Records, and who was one of his earliest champions.

== Reception ==
The Allmusic review by Scott Yanow awarded the album 3 stars and states: "even though the results fall short of classic, they should interest Bill Evans collectors".

Professional ratings
Review scores
Source	Rating
Allmusic	3/5 stars
The Rolling Stone Jazz Record Guide	3/5 stars
The Penguin Guide to Jazz Recordings	3/4 stars

== Track listing ==
All compositions by Bill Evans except as indicated

1. "Re: Person I Knew" - 5:20
2. "Sugar Plum" - 8:17
3. "Alfie" (Burt Bacharach, Hal David) - 4:59
4. "T.T.T. (Twelve Tone Tune)" - 5:31
5. "Excerpt from Dolphin Dance/Very Early" (Herbie Hancock/Bill Evans) - 7:26
6. "34 Skidoo" - 6:05
7. "Emily" (Johnny Mandel, Johnny Mercer) - 5:17
8. "Are You All the Things" - 6:21

- Recorded at the Village Vanguard, New York City, on January 11 & 12, 1974.

== Personnel ==
- Bill Evans - piano
- Eddie Gómez - bass
- Marty Morell - drums
