= Marty Morell =

American musician (born 1944)

- Born: February 25, 1944 (age 82); Manhattan, New York, US
- Origin: Astoria, Queens
- Genres: Jazz
- Instrument: Drums
- Years active: 1964–present
- Member of: The Jazz Professors

Marty Morell (born February 25, 1944) is a jazz drummer who was a member of the Bill Evans Trio for seven years—longer than any other drummer. Before joining Evans, he worked with the Al Cohn-Zoot Sims Quintet, Red Allen, Gary McFarland, Steve Kuhn, and Gábor Szabó.

== Career ==
According to an interview with Marc Myers, Morell began his career touring with singer Robert Goulet in 1964. He was introduced to pianist Bill Evans by bassist Chuck Israels. From 1968 to 1974, he was a member of Evans' trio along with bassist Eddie Gómez. Peter Pettinger, a biographer of Evans, called Morell "an unsung stalwart of piano trio history":

[H]e had been responsible for an exceedingly tight unit that could swing and drive relentlessly. His control of the twelve-bar sections in a number like "Twelve Tone Tune," for instance, was as snappy and precise as could be. At the same time, on ballads, he never failed to provide a listening cushion of the utmost delicacy, seeming to imbue his drums with the ability to breathe of their own volition, and always in expressive union with his leader.

Some of the important albums he recorded with Evans include The Bill Evans Album, The Tokyo Concert, Since We Met, and Symbiosis.

After leaving the trio, he settled in Toronto, Canada, and became a studio drummer. He led bands as a drummer and played vibraphone and congas with the 1970s funk-jazz band Ravin'. He has played on jingles and films and has worked with Don Sebesky, Stan Getz, Kenny Wheeler, and Claus Ogerman. From 1968 to 1971, he was a member of Rob McConnell's Boss Brass.

He has taught drums and percussion at the University of Central Florida and has recorded with The Jazz Professors, a band consisting of university faculty members: saxophonist Jeff Rupert, bassist Richard Drexler, pianist Per Danielsson, trombonist Michael Wilkinson, and guitarist Bobby Koelble. The band has had two albums on the top of the chart at JazzWeek magazine in 2011 and 2013.

== Discography ==
With Canadian Brass

- Red, White & Brass (1991)
- Red Hot Jazz (1993)
- Seen and Heard (2004)

With Bill Evans

- What's New (Verve, 1969)
- The Secret Sessions Recorded at the Village Vanguard, discs 7 and 8 (Milestone Records, 1969 and 1973, respectively)
- Autumn Leaves (Lotus, 1969)
- Jazzhouse (Milestone, 1969)
- You're Gonna Hear from Me (Milestone, 1969)
- Quiet Now (Charly, 1969)
- From Left to Right (MGM, 1970)
- Montreux II (CTI, 1970)
- The Bill Evans Album (Columbia, 1971)
- Living Time (Columbia, 1972)
- The Tokyo Concert (Fantasy, 1973)
- Half Moon (Milestone, 1973)
- Since We Met (Fantasy, 1974)
- Re: Person I Knew (Fantasy, 1974)
- Symbiosis (MPS, 1974)
- But Beautiful (Milestone, 1974)
- Blue in Green: The Concert in Canada (Milestone, 1974)
- Bill Evans Trio in Buenos Aires, Vol. 1: 1973 Concert (1991)
- Paris (1965) (1992)
- Live in Tokyo (1994)
- The Secret Sessions (1996)
- Half Moon Bay (1998)
- Piano Player (1998)
- Koln Concert 1976 (2005)
- Live in Rome 1979 (2005)
- Waltz for Debby: The Complete 1969 Pescara Festival (2005)
- Complete February 1972 Paris ORTF Performance (2006)
- Evolution of a Trio (2006)
- Live in Ottawa 1974 (2007)
- In Helsinki 1970 (2009)
- Live in Paris 1974 (2009)
- Live at Art D'Lugoff's Top of the Gate (2012)
- Momentum (2012)

With The Jazz Professors

- The Jazz Professors: Live at the UCF-Orlando Jazz Festival (Flying Horse, 2012)
- Do That Again (Flying Horse, 2013)

With Rob McConnell & the Boss Brass

- Big Band Jazz (1978)
- Present Perfect (1981)
- Live in Digital (1992)

With Gábor Szabó

- The Sorcerer (Impulse!, 1967)
- More Sorcery (Impulse!, 1967)

With Kenny Wheeler

- Ensemble Fusionaire (CBC, 1976)
- 1976 (1976)

With others

- The October Suite Steve Kuhn/Gary McFarland (1966)
- The College Concert, Pee Wee Russell and Red Allen (Impulse!, 1966)
- Monium, Jeremy Steig (Columbia, 1974)
- New Life, Bernie Senensky (1975)
- Museum Pieces, Moe Koffman (1978)
- Back Again, The Hi-Lo's (1979)
- Night Flight, Sammy Nestico (1986)
- I Remember Bill: Tribute to Bill Evans, Don Sebesky (1998)
- Magic Voices, The Singers Unlimited (1998)
- A Man and His Music, Claus Ogerman (2004)
- Sketch for Summer, Gary McFarland (2008)
- Coral Sea, Kenny Drew Jr. (Random Act, 2012)
