= Blue in Green: The Concert in Canada =

Live album by Bill Evans
- Released: 1991
- Recorded: August 1974
- Genre: Jazz
- Length: 50:48
- Label: Milestone

Bill Evans chronology
But Beautiful (1974)	Blue in Green: The Concert in Canada (1991)	Intuition (1974)

Blue in Green: The Concert in Canada is a live album by jazz pianist Bill Evans with Eddie Gómez and Marty Morell recorded in Camp Fortune, Gatineau, Quebec, Canada in 1974 and released on the Milestone label in 1991.

== Reception ==
The Allmusic review by Scott Yanow awarded the album 4½ stars and states: "The tight and almost telepathic musical communication between the musicians, the strong repertoire and the appreciative audience make this a fairly definitive recording by this classic unit".

Professional ratings
Review scores
Source	Rating
Allmusic	4.5/5 stars
The Penguin Guide to Jazz Recordings	3/4 stars

== Track listing ==
All compositions by Bill Evans except as indicated

1. "One for Helen" - 6:13
2. "The Two Lonely People" (Bill Evans, Carol Hall) - 7:03
3. "What Are You Doing the Rest of Your Life?" (Alan and Marilyn Bergman, Michel Legrand) - 4:38
4. "So What" (Miles Davis) - 6:47
5. "Very Early" - 5:32
6. "If You Could See Me Now" (Tadd Dameron, Carl Sigman) - 3:53
7. "34 Skidoo" - 7:33
8. "Blue in Green" (Davis, Evans) - 3:40
9. "T.T.T. (Twelve Tone Tune)" - 5:29
  - Recorded in Camp Fortune, Ottawa, Ontario, Canada, in August, 1974.

== Personnel ==
- Bill Evans - piano
- Eddie Gómez - bass
- Marty Morell - drums
