= Eddie Gómez =

Puerto Rican bassist (born 1944)

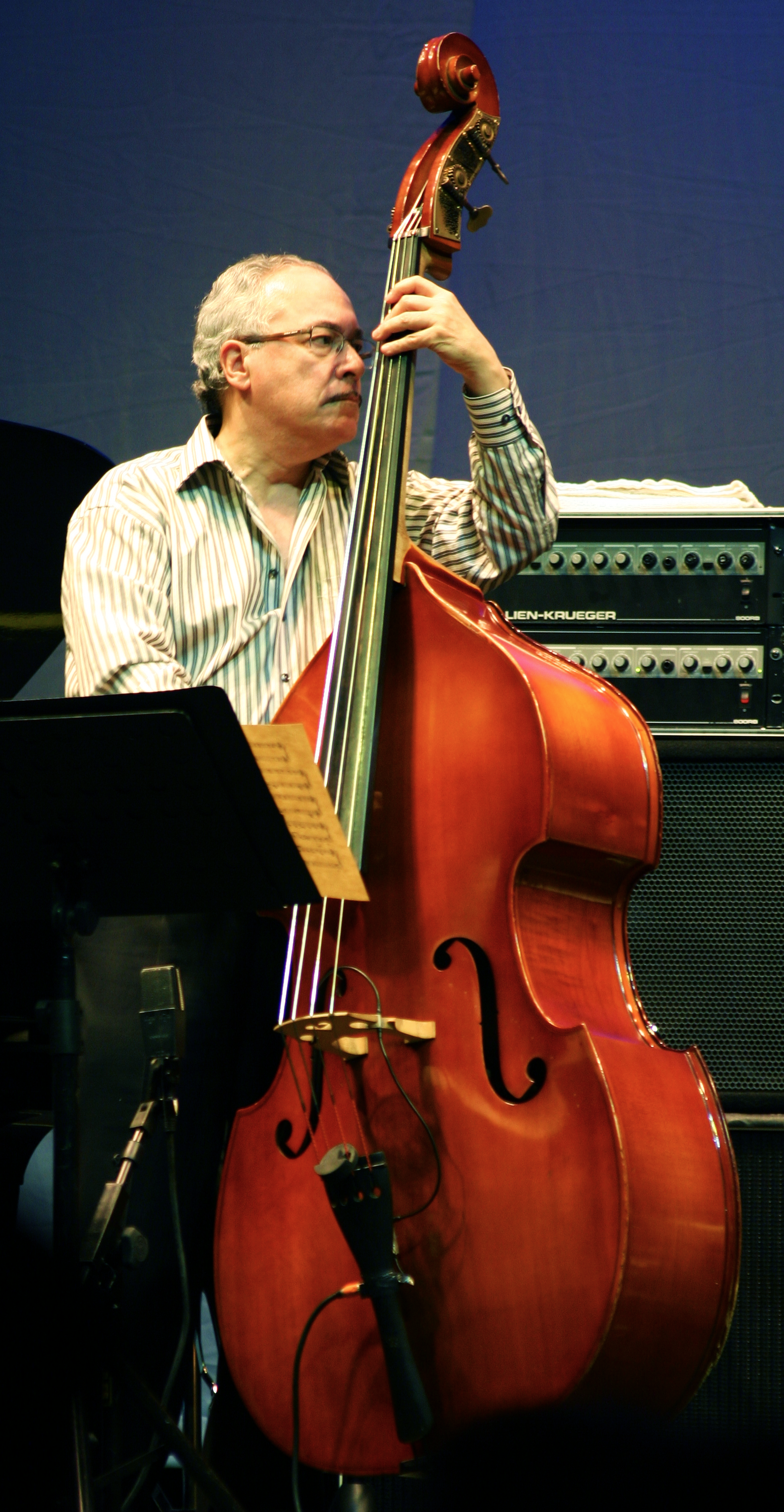
- Gómez on tour with Chick Corea, May 2010, Santiago, Chile

Background information
- Born: Edgar Gómez; October 4, 1944 (age 82); Santurce, Puerto Rico
- Origin: New York City
- Genres: Jazz, jazz fusion
- Occupation: Musician
- Instrument: Double bass
- Years active: 1959–present
- Label: Columbia
- Website: eddiegomez.com

Edgar Gómez (born October 4, 1944) is a Puerto Rican jazz double bassist, known for his work with the Bill Evans Trio from 1966 to 1977.

== Biography ==
Gómez moved with his family from Puerto Rico at a young age to New York, where he was raised. He started on double bass in the New York City school system at the age of eleven and at age thirteen went to the New York City High School of Music & Art. He played in the Newport Festival Youth Band (led by Marshall Brown) from 1959 to 1961, and graduated from Juilliard in 1963.

He has played with musicians such as Gerry Mulligan, Marian McPartland, Paul Bley, Tania Maria, Steps Ahead, and Chick Corea. He spent a total of eleven years with the Bill Evans Trio, which included performances in the United States, Europe and Asia, as well as dozens of recordings.

His career mainly consists of working as an accompanist, a position suited for his quick reflexes and flexibility. In addition to working as a studio musician for many famous jazz musicians, he has recorded as a leader for Columbia Records, Projazz and Stretch. Many of his recent recordings as a leader are co-led by the jazz pianist Mark Kramer.

In May 2013, Gómez was awarded an Honorary Doctorate of Music from Berklee College of Music in Valencia, Spain. This was the first honorary doctorate granted at the college's new international campus in Spain.

== Discography ==
=== As leader/co-leader ===
Year released	Title	Label	Personnel/Notes
1976	Down Stretch	Trio Records	With Takehiro Honda (piano) and Eliot Zigmund (percussion)
1984	Gomez	Interface	With Chick Corea (piano) and Steve Gadd (drums)
1986	Mezgo	Epic/Sonic	With Michael Brecker (tenor sax), Masahiko Satoh (keyboards), and Steve Gadd (drums)
1988	Power Play	Columbia	With Al Foster and Steve Gadd (drums/percussion), Lee Ann Ledgerwood and Michael Cochrane (keyboards), Michael Brecker (tenor sax), Jeremy Steig (flute), Dick Oatts (soprano sax/alto sax), Jim Hall (guitar on Track No. 5), Ann Bristol, and Kimiko Itoh (vocals on Track No. 9).
1989	Street Smart	Epic/Sony	With Richard Tee (piano), Kenny Werner (keyboards), Randy Brecker (trumpet), Hugh McCracken (guitar), Jack McDuff (organ), Dick Oatts (tenor sax), Barry Rogers (trombone), Steve Gadd (drums/percussion), Nicky Marrero (bongos/timbales), and Steve Thornton (conga/percussion)
1992	Live In Moscow	B&W Music BW-038	With Michael Okun (piano), Steve Amirault (piano), and Ronnie Burrage (drums)
1993	Next Future	Stretch Records	With Chick Corea and James Williams (piano/synthesizer), Rick Margitza (tenor sax/soprano sax), Jeremy Steig (flute), and Lenny White (drums)
1998	Dedication	Evidence	With Stefan Karlsson (piano), Jeremy Steig (flute), and Jimmy Cobb (drums)
1998	Uptown Music	Paddle Wheel	With Stefan Karlsson (piano), Jeremy Steig (flute), and Jimmy Cobb (drums)
2004	Art Of The Heart	Art of Life Records	With Mark Kramer (piano)
2005	Jazz Fiddler on the Roof	Twinz Records	With Mark Kramer (piano) and John Mosemann (drums)
2007	Palermo	Jazz Eyes	With Stefan Karlsson (piano) and Nasheet Waits (drums)
2008	Beautiful Love	Isol Discus	With Al Di Meola (guitar), Yutaka Kobayashi (piano), and Billy Drummond (drums)
2010	Forever	Plus Loin Music	With Cesarius Alvim (piano)
2012	Per Sempre	BFM Jazz	With Teo Clavarella (piano), Matt Marvuglio (flute), and Massimo Manzi (drums)
2014	Live At Montmartre	Storyville	With Carsten Dahl (piano)
2017	Kind of Bill	BFM Jazz	With Dado Moroni (piano) and Joe LaBarbera (drums)

=== As sideman ===
With John Abercrombie

- Structures (Chesky, 2006)

With Warren Bernhardt

- Blue Montreux (Arista, 1978)
- Blue Montreux II (Arista, 1979)
- Warren Bernhardt Trio (DMP, 1983)

With Paul Bley

- Barrage (ESP-Disk, 1965)

With Joanne Brackeen

- Prism (Choice, 1978)
- Keyed In (Tappan Zee, 1979)
- Ancient Dynasty (Tappan Zee, 1980)
- Special Identity (Antilles, 1981)
- Breath of Brazil (Concord Picante, 1991)
- Where Legends Dwell (Ken Music, 1992)
- Take a Chance (Concord Picante, 1993)

With Randy Brecker

- Score (Solid State, 1969)

With Bill Bruford and Ralph Towner

- If Summer Had Its Ghosts (DGM, 1997)

With Frank Caruso and Bob Rummage

- Chosen (CD Baby, 2017)

With Joe Chambers

- Isla Verde (Paddle Wheel, 1995)

With Santos Chillemi

- Trinidad (Maracatu, 1991)
- Au Gre Du Temps (Frémeaux & Associés, 2004)

With Billy Cobham

- Drum 'n' Voice - All That Groove (Sony Music, 2001)

With Chick Corea

- The Leprechaun (Polydor, 1976)
- The Mad Hatter (Polydor, 1978)
- Friends (Polydor, 1978)
- Three Quartets (Warner Bros. Records, 1981)
- The Boston Three Party (Stretch Records, 2007)
- From Miles (Stretch Records, 2007)
- Further Explorations (Concord Jazz, 2012)

With Jack DeJohnette

- The DeJohnette Complex (Milestone, 1969)
- New Directions (ECM, 1978)
- New Directions in Europe (ECM Records, 1980)

With Armen Donelian

- Stargazer (Atlas Records, 1981)

With Eliane Elias

- Illusions (Denon, 1986)
- Cross Currents (Denon, 1987)
- Eliane Elias Plays Jobim (Blue Note, 1990)
- Fantasia (Blue Note, 1992)
- Paulistana (Blue Note, 1993)
- Music from Man of La Mancha (Concord, 2017)

With Peter Erskine

- Peter Erskine (Contemporary, 1982)

With Bill Evans

- A Simple Matter of Conviction (Verve, 1966)
- California Here I Come (Verve, 1967)
- Bill Evans at the Montreux Jazz Festival (Verve, 1968)
- What's New (Verve, 1969)
- Autumn Leaves (Lotus, 1969)
- Jazzhouse (Milestone, 1969)
- You're Gonna Hear From Me (Milestone, 1969)
- From Left to Right (MGM, 1970)
- Quiet Now (Charly, 1970)
- Montreux II (CTI, 1970)
- Homewood (Red Bird Records, 1970)
- The Bill Evans Album (Columbia, 1971)
- Two Super Bill Evans Trios: Live In Europe! (Unique Jazz, 1972)
- Living Time with George Russell Orchestra (Columbia, 1972)
- The Tokyo Concert (Fantasy, 1973)
- Eloquence (Fantasy, 1973)
- Half Moon Bay (Milestone, 1973)
- Since We Met (Fantasy, 1974)
- Re: Person I Knew (Fantasy, 1974)
- Symbiosis (MPS, 1974)
- But Beautiful (Milestone, 1974)
- Blue in Green: The Concert in Canada (Milestone, 1974)
- Live In Europe, Vol.1 & Vol.2 (EPM Musique, 1974)
- Intuition (Fantasy, 1974)
- Montreux III (Fantasy, 1975)
- With Monica Zetterlund - Swedish Concert 1975 (Nova Disc, 1975)
- In His Own Way (Nova Disc, 1975)
- Crosscurrents (Fantasy, 1977)
- I Will Say Goodbye (Fantasy, 1977)
- You Must Believe in Spring (Warner Bros., 1977)
- From The 70's - Unreleased live recordings from 1973-74 (Fantasy, 1983/Original Jazz Classics, 2002)
- Live In Paris 1972 Vol.1 y 2 (France's Concert, 1988)
- Live In Paris 1972 Vol.3 (France's Concert, 1989)
- Switzerland 1975 (Domino Records, 1990)
- Buenos Aires Concert 1973 (Yellow Note Records, 1991)
- The Secret Sessions: Recorded at the Village Vanguard 1966-1975 (Milestone, 1996)
- The Sesjun Radio Shows - Unreleased live recordings from 1973 (Out Of The Blue, 2011)
- Live At Art D'Lugoff's Top Of The Gate - Live recordings 1968 (Resonance, 2012)
- Live '66: The Oslo Concerts (Somethin' Cool, 2016)
- Some Other Time: The Lost Session From The Black Forest - Unreleased live recordings from 1968 (Resonance, 2016)
- Another Time: The Hilversum Concert - Unreleased recording of 1968 (Resonance, 2017)
- On A Monday Evening - Unreleased live recording of 1976 at Madison Union Theater, University of Wisconsin (Fantasy, 2017)
- Evans In England - Unreleased live recording of 1969 (Resonance, 2019)

With Art Farmer

- Yama with Joe Henderson (CTI, 1979)

With Mordy Ferber

- Mr. X (Ozone Music, 1995)
- Being There (CDBY, 2005)

With Michael Franks

- One Bad Habit (Warner Bros., 1980)

With Jeff Gardner

- Continuum (Terramar, 2007)

With Art Garfunkel

- Lefty (Columbia, 1988)

With George Garzone

- Alone (NYC Records, 1995)

With Mick Goodrick

- In Pas(s)ing (ECM, 1979)

With Dino Govoni

- Breakin' Out (Whaling City Sound, 2001)

With Bunky Green

- Places We've Never Been (Vanguard, 1979)

With David Grisman

- Hot Dawg (A&M-Horizon 1978)

With Tim Hardin

- Tim Hardin 4 (Verve, 1969)

With Billy Hart

- Rah (Gramavision, 1988)

With Richie Havens

- Something Else Again (Verve Forecast, 1967)

With Terumasa Hino

- Double Rainbow (CBS, 1981)

With Jennifer Holliday

- Say You Love Me (Geffen, 1985)

With Freddie Hubbard

- Sweet Return (Atlantic, 1983)

With Sandy Hurvitz

- Sandy's Album Is Here At Last (Verve, 1968)

With Bob James

- All Around The Town (CBS, 1981)

With Andrei Kondakov

- Fairy Tale In The Rain (Outline Records, 2012)
- Blues For 4 (СПб Собака RU, 2005)

With Lee Konitz

- The Lee Konitz Duets (Milestone, 1968)
- Peacemeal (Milestone, 1969)

With Mark Kramer

- Jazz Fiddler on the Roof (Mythic Jazz, 2002 | Twinz, 2005)
- Art of the Heart (Art of Life, 2006)
- Kind of Trio with Joe Chambers (Eroica, 2008 | Strawberry Mansion, 2017)
- Boulders and Mountains (Eroica, 2009 | Blue Node, 2017)
- Art of Music (Strawberry Mansion, 2017)

With Ernie Krivda

- The Alchemist (Inner City, 1978)

With Kronos Quartet

- Music of Bill Evans (Landmark Records, 1986)

With Andy LaVerne

- Liquid Silver (DMP, 1984)
- Metropolis - Unreleased recording of 1979 (ALV Productions, 2018)

With Tom Lellis

- And In This Corner... (Inner City, 1979)
- Double Entendre (Beamtide Records, 1991)
- Tom Lellis (Solid Records, 2018)

With Dave Liebman

- Monk's Mood (Double-Time, 1999)

With Joe Locke

- Moment to Moment - The Music of Henry Mancini (Milestone, 1994)

With Giuseppi Logan

- The Giuseppi Logan Quartet (ESP-Disk, 1965)
- More (ESP-Disk, 1966)

With Enric Madriguera

- The Minute Samba 1932-50, Vol. 2 (Harlequin, 2003)

With Mike Mainieri

- An American Diary (NYC Records, 1995)
- Live At Seventh Avenue South (NYC Records, 1996)

With Melissa Manchester

- Joy (Angel Records, 1997)

With Manhattan Jazz Quintet

- My Funny Valentine (Paddle Wheel, 1986)
- The Sidewinder (Paddle Wheel, 1986)
- Live At Pit Inn (Paddle Wheel, 1986)
- Live At Pit Inn Vol. 2 (Paddle Wheel, 1986)
- My Favorite Things - Live in Tokio (Paddle Wheel, 1986)
- Manhattan Blues (Sweet Basil, 1990)
- Funky Strut (Sweet Basil, 1991)
- Manteca - Live At Sweet Basil (Sweet Basil, 1992)
- Concierto de Aranjuez (Sweet Basil, 1994)

With Herbie Mann

- Peace Pieces - The Music Of Bill Evans (Kokopelli Records, 1995)
- America/Brasil (Lightyear Entertainment, 1997)

With Andrea Marcelli

- Beyond The Blue (Art Of Life, 2005)

With Tania Maria

- Intimidade (Blue Note, 2005)

With Phil Markowitz

- Sno' Peas (Bellaphon, 1981)

With Hugh Masekela

- Home Is Where the Music Is (Blue Thumb Records, 1972)

With Eugene Maslov

- The Face Of Love (Mack Avenue Records, 1999)

With Paul McCandless

- All the Mornings Bring (Elektra, 1979)

With Jay McShann

- The Big Apple Bash (Atlantic, 1979)

With Charles Mingus

- Me, Myself & Eye - Posthumous recording, Mingus does not play. (Atlantic, 1979)
- Something Like a Bird - Posthumous recording, Mingus does not play. (Atlantic, 1980)

With Bob Mintzer

- Bop Boy (Explore Records, 2002)

With Bob Moses

- Bittersuite In The Ozone (Mozown, 1975)
- Visit With The Great Spirit (Gramavision, 1983)

With Gerry Mulligan

- Something Borrowed - Something Blue (Limelight, 1966)

With The New York Art Quartet

- Call It Art (Triple Point, 2013)

With Judy Niemack

- About Time (Sony, 2002)

With Mike Nock

- Ondas (ECM, 1981)

With Claus Ogerman

- Claus Ogerman Featuring Michael Brecker (GRP, 1991)

With Michel Petrucciani

- Michel plays Petrucciani (Blue Note, 1988)

With Marco Pignataro

- Sofia's Heart (CD Baby, 2007)

With David Pomeranz

- Time To Fly (Decca, 1971)

With Emily Remler

- Transitions (Concord, 1983)
- Catwalk (Concord, 1985)

With Alex Riel

- Unriel! (Stunt Records, 1997)

With Ted Rosenthal

- Calling You (CTI Records, 1992)

With Iñaki Sandoval

- Miracielos (Bebyne, 2011)

With Masahiko Satoh

- Chagall Blue (Openskye, 1980)
- Amorphism (Sony, 1985)

With Tom Schuman

- Extremities (GRP, 1990)

With John Scofield

- Who's Who? (Arista/Novus, 1979)

With Phil Seamen

- Phil Seamen Meets Eddie Gómez (Saga, 1968)

With Ben Sidran

- Bop City (Island, 1983)

With Carly Simon

- Torch (Warner Bros., 1981)

With Smappies

- Smappies II (Victor, 1999)

With Tommy Smith

- Step by Step (Blue Note Records, 1988)

With David Spinozza

- Spinozza (A&M Records, 1978)

With Spyro Gyra

- City Kids (MCA Records, 1983)

With Jeremy Steig

- Jeremy & The Satyrs (Reprise, 1968)
- Legwork (Solid State, 1970)
- Wayfaring Stranger (Blue Note, 1971)
- Energy (Capitol, 1971)
- Fusion (Groove Merchant, 1972) - contains Energy and additional tracks
- Monium (Columbia, 1974)
- Outlaws (Enja. 1977)
- Lend Me Your Ears (CMP, 1978) with Joe Chambers
- Music for Flute & Double-Bass (CMP, 1979)
- Rain Forest (CMP, 1980)
- Jam (Steig-Gomez Records, 2003)
- What's New At F (Tokuma Japan, 2004)

With Steps Ahead

- Step by Step (Better Days, 1980)
- Smokin' in the Pit (NYC Records, 1980)
- Paradox - Live At Seventh Avenue South (Better Days, 1982)
- Steps Ahead (Elektra Musician, 1983)
- Modern Times (Elektra Musician, 1984)

With Richard Stoltzman

- Begin Sweet World (RCA, 1986)
- Brasil (BMG, 1991)
- Hark! (BMG Classics, 1992)
- Dreams (RCA, 1995)
- Danza Latina (RCA, 1998)

With Ira Sullivan

- The Incredible Ira Sullivan (Stash, 1980)

With Martin Taylor

- Kiss and Tell (Columbia, 1999)

With The Gadd Gang

- The Gadd Gang (A Touch, 1986)
- Here & Now (Columbia, 1988)
- Live At The Bottom Line (A Touch, 1994)

With Great Jazz Trio

- Moreover (East Wind, 1980)
- The Session / Sleepy Meets The Great Jazz Trio (Next Wave, 1980)
- Chapter II (East Wind, 1981)
- Re-Visited - The Great Jazz Trio At The Village Vanguard Volume 1 (Eastworld, 1981)
- Re-Visited - The Great Jazz Trio At The Village Vanguard Volume 2 (Eastworld, 1981)
- Aurex Jazz Festival' 81 / The Great Jazz Trio & Friends With Nancy Wilson (Eastworld, 1981)
- What's New - with Nancy Wilson (East Wind, 1982)
- Threesome (Eastworld, 1982)
- The Club New Yorker (Interface, 1983)
- Easy To Love: Eri Sings Cole Porter - with Eri Ohno (Interface, 1984)
- Monk's Mood (Denon, 1984)
- N.Y. Sophisticate: A Tribute To Duke Ellington (Denon, 1984)
- Ambrosia - with Art Farmer (Denon/Interface, 1984)
- The Great Jazz Trio Standard Collection (Interface, 1986)
- The Great Jazz Trio Plays Standard (Somethin' Else, 1998)

With Eugenio Toussaint

- Oinos (Música para beber vino) (Urtext, 2008)

With Ralph Towner

- Batik (ECM, 1978)
- Old Friends, New Friends (ECM, 1979)

With McCoy Tyner

- Supertrios (Milestone, 1977)

With Gabriel Vicéns

- Point In Time (Self-Released, 2012)

With Roseanna Vitro

- Conviction: Thoughts Of Bill Evans (A-Records, 2001)

With Bennie Wallace

- The Fourteen Bar Blues (Enja Records, 1978)
- Live At The Public Theatre (Enja Records, 1978)
- The Free Will (Enja Records, 1980)
- Mystic Bridge (Enja Records, 1982)
- Twilight Time (Blue Note, 1985)
- The Art Of Saxophone (Denon, 1987)
- Bordertown (Blue Note, 1988)
- Bennie Wallace (AudioQuest Music, 1998)
- The Nearness Of You (Enja Records, 2003)

With Jack Wilkins

- Merge (Chiaroscuro, 1977)
- Reunion (Chiaroscuro, 2001)

With Larry Willis

- Inner Crisis (Groove Merchant, 1973)
- Blue Fable (HighNote, 2007)
- The Offering (HighNote, 2008)

With Daniel Wong

- Daniel Wong Trio (Fonarte Latino 2014)
