= Earl Zindars =

American composer (1927–2005)

- Born: September 25, 1927
- Origin: Chicago, Illinois, U.S.
- Died: August 15, 2005 (aged 77) San Francisco, California, U.S.
- Education: DePaul University; Northwestern University; Oxford University; Columbia University
- Genres: Jazz, classical
- Occupations: Composer, percussionist

Earl Zindars (September 25, 1927 – August 15, 2005) was an American percussionist and composer of jazz and classical music.

== Biography ==
Zindars was born in Chicago, Illinois, United States, and began studying percussion in elementary school. He attended DePaul University and Northwestern University, where he worked with the composer Wallingford Riegger, before studying as a Fulbright scholar at Oxford University in England. While doing postgraduate work at Columbia University, he played timpani at Radio City Music Hall and married the jazz singer Anne Bohigian. The best man at his wedding was lifelong friend Bill Evans, whom he had met while both of them were serving in the military during the Korean War and playing in military bands. Zindars and his wife had two daughters, Helene and Karen, who referred to Evans as "Uncle Bill" when he stayed with the family in San Francisco during West Coast tours. Zindars taught music composition and theory for six years at San Francisco State College.

Trained as a classical and jazz percussionist, Zindars went on to compose works for various ensembles. Many of his jazz pieces were recorded by Evans, including "Elsa" (1961), "How My Heart Sings" (1962), "Mother of Earl" (1968), "Soirée" and "Lullaby for Helene" (1970), "Sareen Jurer" (1974), and "Quiet Light" (1977), and Evans played several other Zindars pieces in live concerts. Zindars recorded three tracks with Evans on the album The Soul of Jazz Percussion (1960), which also features Donald Byrd, Pepper Adams, Paul Chambers, and Philly Joe Jones.

In the liner notes to his 1962 album How My Heart Sings!, Evans wrote of Zindars that "as is evidenced here," he "is a songwriter of outstanding merit." Evans also called him "a very fine symphonic percussionist as well as a jazz drummer" and "a composer of extended works for string quartet, brass ensembles, symphony orchestras, etc."

After Evans' death, "How My Heart Sings", in particular, went on to become a jazz standard, recorded many times. In 1985, guitarists Larry Coryell and Emily Remler covered it on their album Together. Zindars continued to compose and wrote a tribute piece to Evans in 1995 titled "I Always Think of You.".

Pianist Bill Cunliffe brought out a sextet CD in 2003, also titled How My Heart Sings, dedicating it exclusively to the music of Zindars. Cunliffe described Zindars' contribution:

He [Zindars] was an interesting composer in that he was one of the first, along with Brubeck, to write songs where the time signature changes. For example, on "How My Heart Sings," the first part of the song is in a waltz feel, but the middle part of the tune is in a 4/4, medium, swing jazz feel. That was very, very innovative for the fifties. Very few guys were doing that. His music is very interesting harmonically as well and he has a really strong melodic sense. He's a very good composer.

Zindars appeared on KCSM's Desert Island Jazz program in 2003. He released two compact discs with his compositions: The Return and And Then Some. They were limited releases, featuring the trios of Bay Area pianists Don Haas and Larry Dunlap.

Zindars died of cancer in San Francisco at the age of 77. A San Francisco Chronicle obituary noted, "Zindars, who expressed himself more through his music than words, composed his final composition less than a month" before dying; "it was called 'Roses for Annig' and was dedicated to his wife of 43 years."

Between 2006 and 2009, the Italian pianist Luciano Troja recorded a Zindars album titled At Home with Zindars (2010). AllAboutJazz noted in a review: "Enchanted by Zindars' compositions, Troja embarked on a five-year odyssey to meet the sources of Zindars' inspiration—his wife and daughters—and to record, over several years, sixteen of Zindars' pieces. Troja's dedication and evident inspiration gave rise to these heartfelt and arresting personal forays into a composer's music whose influence on Evans was profound."
