= Helen Keane (jazz) =

Jazz producer and manager (1923–1996)

Helen Keane (February 16, 1924, New York City – April 22, 1996, New York City) was an American jazz producer and manager.

Keane worked early in her career as a music and television talent scout for the labels CBS and MCA in the 1950s. Among the entertainers she worked with at this time were Harry Belafonte, Don Knotts, and Carol Burnett.

She was Bill Evans's manager and producer from 1963 until his death in 1980, and also worked with Kenny Burrell, Art Farmer, Paquito D'Rivera, Joanne Brackeen, Keith McDonald, Sylvia Syms, Morgana King, Chris Connor, and Carol Sloane.

== Death ==
Keane died of breast cancer in 1996 at Cabrini Hospice in Manhattan.
