= Jim Hall discography =

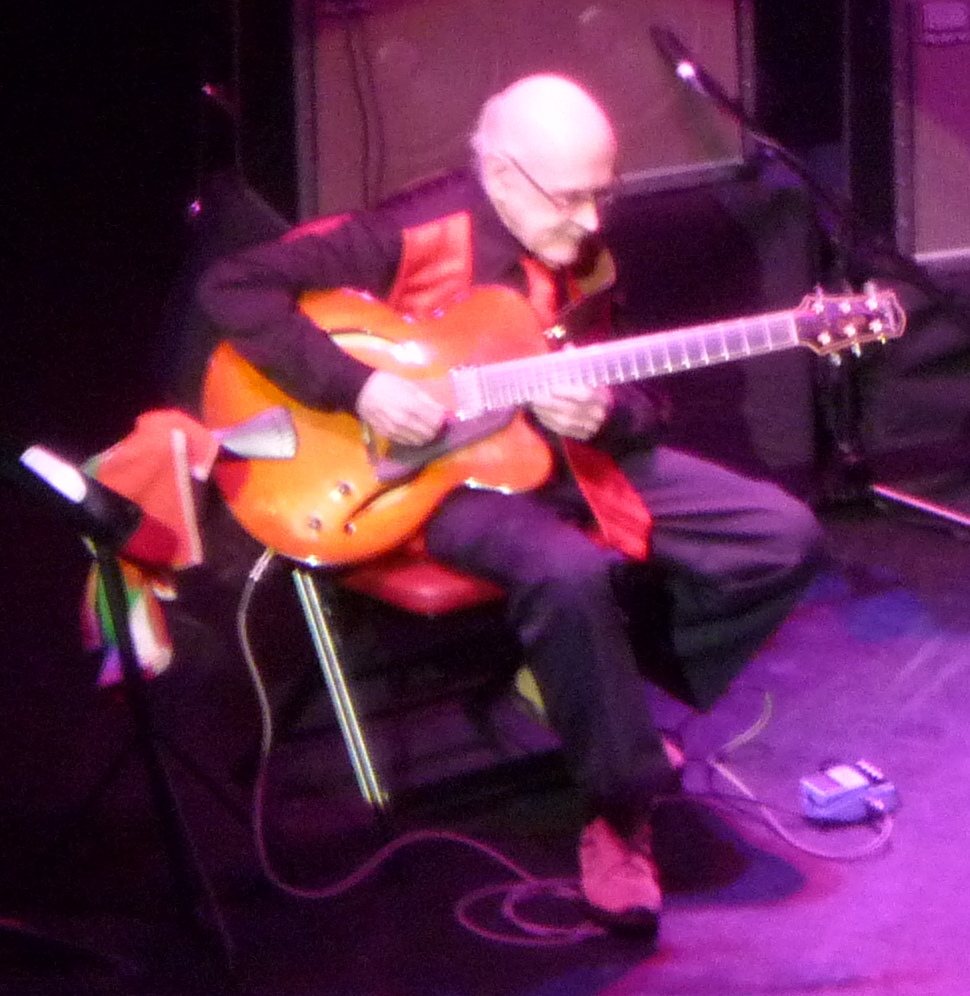
- Jim Hall at Sonny Rollins's 80th birthday show
- Studio albums: 38
- EPs: 1
- Live albums: 15
- Compilation albums: 22
- Singles: 1
- Video albums: 10

Jim Hall was an American jazz guitarist, composer, and arranger. His discography consists of 39 studio albums, 10 live albums, 1 EP, 1 single, 10 videos, and 22 compilations, all released between 1957 and 2016. In addition, he was a sideman on numerous albums by other artists.

== Studio albums (as leader/co-leader) ==
- 1957: Jazz Guitar (Pacific Jazz, 1957) – reissued in 1964 with overdubbed drums as The Winner! (Fontana). Also reissued in 2014 as disc 2 of the 10-disc collection Jazz Guitar: Ultimate Collection, Vol. 1 (Documents)
- 1957: The Street Swingers with Bob Brookmeyer and Jimmy Raney (World Pacific, 1958)
- 1958?: A Girl & a Guitar with Lee Schaefer (United Artists, 1958)
- 1960: Jazz Abstractions with Gunther Schuller (Atlantic, 1961)
- 1963: Undercurrent with Bill Evans (United Artists, 1962)
- 1964 Two Jims and Zoot with Jimmy Raney and Zoot Sims (Mainstream) – reissued as Otra Vez (Mainstream, 1972)
- 1966: Intermodulation with Bill Evans (Verve, 1966)
- 1969: It's Nice to Be With You (MPS, 1969)
- 1971: Where Would I Be? (Milestone, 1972)
- 1975: Concierto (CTI, 1975)
- 1976: Commitment (A&M/Horizon, 1976)
- 1978: Big Blues with Art Farmer (CTI, 1979)
- 1981?: Concierto de Aranjuez with David Matthews Orchestra (Electric Bird, 1981)
- 1981: First Edition with George Shearing (Concord, 1981)
- 1981: Circles (Concord, 1981)
- 1982: Studio Trieste with Chet Baker and Hubert Laws (CTI, 1982)
- 1986: Jim Hall's Three with Steve LaSpina and Akira Tana (Concord, 1986)
- 1988: These Rooms with Tom Harrell, Joey Baron, and Steve LaSpina (Denon, 1988)
- 1989: All Across the City with Gil Goldstein, Terry Clarke, and Steve LaSpina (Concord, 1989)
- 1982–1992: Youkali (CTI, 1992)
- 1982–1992: Unissued 1982-1992 (Musica Jazz, 1994)
- 1992?: Subsequently (MusicMasters, 1992)
- 1993: Something Special with Larry Goldings and Steve LaSpina (Inner City, 1993)
- 1993: Dedications & Inspirations (Telarc, 1994)
- 1995: Dialogues (Telarc, 1995)
- 1996: Textures (Telarc, 1997)
- 1998: By Arrangement (Telarc, 1998)
- 1998: Jim Hall & Pat Metheny with Pat Metheny (Telarc, 1999)
- 2001: Jim Hall & Basses (Telarc, 2001)
- 2004: Magic Meeting with Scott Colley and Lewis Nash (ArtistShare, 2004)
- 2004: Duologues with Enrico Pieranunzi (Cam Jazz, 2005)
- 2005: Free Association with Geoffrey Keezer (ArtistShare, 2006)
- 2007–2008: Hemispheres with Bill Frisell, Joey Baron and Scott Colley (ArtistShare, 2008)[2CD]
- 2010: Conversations with Joey Baron (ArtistShare, 2010)

== Live albums ==
- 1972: Alone Together with Ron Carter (Milestone, 1973)
- 1975: Jim Hall Live! with Don Thompson and Terry Clarke (Horizon, 1975)
- 1975: Jim Hall Live, Vol. 2–4 with Don Thompson and Terry Clarke (ArtistShare, 2012)
- 1976: Live in Tokyo (Paddle Wheel, 1980)
- 1978: Jim Hall/Red Mitchell with Red Mitchell (Artists House, 1978)
- 1982: Live at Village West with Ron Carter (Concord Jazz, 1984)
- 1984: Telephone with Ron Carter (Concord Jazz, 1985)
- 1986: Power of Three with Michel Petrucciani and Wayne Shorter (Blue Note, 1987)
- 1990: Live at Town Hall, Vols. 1 & 2 (MusicMasters, 1991) – initially released as individual volumes, later released as an omnibus by Jazz Heritage
- 1996: Panorama: Live at the Village Vanguard (Telarc, 1997)
- 1998: Jazzpar Quartet + 4 (Storyville, 1998) – at Jazzpar Prize
- 2000: Grand Slam: Live at the Regatta Bar with Joe Lovano et al. (Telarc, 2000)
- 2010: Live at Birdland with Joey Baron, Greg Osby, Steve LaSpina (ArtistShare, 2012)

Posthumous releases

- Charlie Haden/Jim Hall with Charlie Haden (Impulse!, 2014) – recorded in 1990
- Jim Hall Live in London at Ronnie Scott's – 1966 with Jeff Clyne and Allan Ganley (Harkit Digital, 2016) – recorded in 1966
- Valse Hot: Live at the Sweet Basil 1978 with Red Mitchell (ArtistShare, 2016) – recorded in 1978

== Compilation albums ==
All compilations were issued under Jim Hall's name unless otherwise indicated.

- 1968 various artists (V.A.), Berlin Festival Guitar Workshop (MPS) - track B1, "Careful / The Touch of Your Lips"; track B2, "You Stepped Out of a Dream" (with Barney Kessel)
- 1969 V.A., All-Star White House Tribute to Duke Ellington (Blue Note)
- 1983 Jim Hall (CTI) – Japan-only release. collects three previously released songs: "Concierto de Aranjuez," "Swan Lake," and "Pavane For A Dead Princess".
- 1986 Sonny Rollins, The Quartets featuring Jim Hall (RCA) – includes The Bridge along with 7 songs 1962 and 1964 that feature Jim Hall
- 1987 The Paul Desmond Quartet with Jim Hall, The Complete Recordings Of The Paul Desmond Quartet With Jim Hall (Mosaic) – the complete recordings of Paul Desmond with Jim Hall along with 12 previously unissued performances
- 1992 Zoot Sims and His Orchestra featuring Jim Hall, Recado Bossa Nova (Fresh Sounds) – collects songs from Sims's New Beat Bossa Nova albums
- 1992 V.A., Santa's Bag: An All-Star Jazz Christmas (Telarc) – track 10, "O Tannenbaum"
- 1993 V.A., A Jazz Valentine: In the Mood for Love (MusicMasters) – track 1, "I'm in the Mood for Love"
- 1995 Jimmy Giuffre with Jim Hall, Trio & Quartet (Giants Of Jazz) – Italian release
- 1995 V.A., Color and Light: Jazz Sketches of Sondheim (Sony) – track 7, "One More Kiss"; track 10, "What Can You Lose?"
- 1995 The Paul Desmond Quartet With Jim Hall, The Paul Desmond Quartet With Jim Hall (Giants Of Jazz) – European release
- 1997 Paul Desmond featuring Jim Hall, The Complete RCA Victor Recordings (RCA Victor) – includes all recordings of Paul Desmond with Jim Hall except the Warner Bros. album First Place Again
- 1998 The Concord Jazz Heritage Series (Concord) – collects songs from Hall's albums on the Concord label
- 2000 Ballad Essentials (Concord) – spans 1981–1989; songs from Circles, Jim Hall's Three, All Across the City, First Edition, and Live at Village West
- 2001 Mugonuta/Live in Tokyo (Atlas) – includes Live in Tokyo album plus four tracks from Jazz Impressions of Japan
- 2001 Jim Hall and Ron Carter - Telepathy (Concord) – reissue of the albums Live At Village West and Telephone
- 2002 Storyteller (Concord) – reissue of the albums Circles and All Across the City
- 2002 Downbeat Critic's Choice (Telarc) – collects 12 songs from albums Hall recorded between 1995 and 2001 for Telarc
- 2004 The Unreleased Sessions (Lone Hill Jazz) – collects two Buddy Collette albums (Porgy & Bess and At the Cinema!) plus four songs from Tanganyika
- 2005 CTI Best Of Jim Hall (CTI)
- 2006 Hallmarks: The Best of Jim Hall's (Concord Jazz) – includes songs from his albums on the Concord and Telarc labels
- 2009 V.A., Douglas on Blue Note (WienerWorld / Douglas) – track 8, "My Funny Valentine" with Bill Evans
- 2011 The Complete "Jazz Guitar" (Essential Jazz Classics) – contains complete (unedited) versions of songs from the Jazz Guitar album, plus 5 bonus tracks
- 2018 Wonderboy (Nagel-Heyer) – collect 27 songs

== EPs ==
- 1958: Jazz Guitar: Jim Hall Trio EP (Pacific Jazz / Vogue) - songs: A1: "Stompin' at the Savoy"; A2: "This is Always"; B1: "Thanks for the Memory"

== Singles ==
- 1957: "Satin Doll" (The Chico Hamilton Quintet) / "Stella by Starlight" (The Jim Hall Trio) (Pacific Jazz)

== Tribute albums ==
- 2014: Ron Carter - In Memory of Jim (Sonethin' Else) with Larry Coryell and Peter Bernstein
- 2014: Kim Ji Hoon and Ahn Jae Jin - Locutions: A Tribute to Jim Hall (Audioguy)
- 2014: Satoshi Inoue - Plays Jim Hall (What's New)

== As backing musician ==
=== A–C ===
With Nat Adderley

- 1960: That's Right! (Riverside)
- 1963: Little Big Horn (album) (Riverside)

With Manny Albam

- 1962: Jazz Goes to the Movies (Impulse!)

With Anamari

- 1964: Anamari (Atlantic)

With Ruby Braff

- 1958: Ruby Braff Goes Girl Crazy (Warner Bros.)

With Buddy Bregman and his Dance Band

- 1959: Swingin' Standards (World Pacific)

With Bob Brookmeyer

- 1957: Traditionalism Revisited (World Pacific)
- 1958: Kansas City Revisited (United Artists)
- 1961:7 x Wilder (Verve)
- 1962: Trombone Jazz Samba (Verve)
- 1958: On the Way to the Sky (Jazzline/Delta Music, released in 2016) with Mel Lewis and the WDR Big Band, from a 1958 radio broadcast

With Paul Bryant

- 1960: Burnin' (Pacific Jazz) reissued in 2010 by Fresh Sound on one CD along with The Blues Message by Paul Bryant and Curtis Amy.

With Gary Burton

- 1963: Something's Coming! (RCA)
- 1992: Six Pack (GRP)

With Bill Charlap

- 2002: Stardust guest appearance on 1 track (Blue Note)

With June Christy

- 1959: Recalls Those Kenton Days (Capitol; reissued on CD in 2001)

With Ornette Coleman

- 1972: Broken Shadows (Columbia, released 1982) also released in 2000 as part of The Complete Science Fiction Sessions (Columbia)

With Buddy Collette

- 1956: Tanganyika (Dig)
- 1957: Porgy & Bess (Interlude, released 1959)
- 1959: Buddy Collette and His Swinging Shepherds At the Cinema! (Mercury)

=== D–G ===
With Paul Desmond

- 1959: First Place Again (Warner Bros) also released as East of the Sun in 1981
- 1961: Desmond Blue (RCA Victor) also released as Late Lament with bonus tracks
- 1962: Two of a Mind (RCA Victor) with Gerry Mulligan (Hall only present on two outtakes added to CD reissue)
- 1963: Take Ten (RCA Victor)
- 1964: Glad To Be Unhappy (RCA Victor)
- 1964: Bossa Antigua (RCA Victor)
- 1965: Easy Living (RCA Victor)

With Eric Dolphy and John Lewis

- 1960: Play Kurt Weill (Lone Hill Jazz) released in 2008 - complete Mike Zwerin album of the music of Kurt Weill; tracks 1-7 released in 1965 as Mack The Knife And Other Berlin Theatre Songs Of Kurt Weill

With Bill Evans

- 1962: Interplay (Riverside)
- 1962: Loose Blues (Milestone, released 1982)
- 1963: Undercurrent (United Artists)
- 1966: Intermodulation (Verve)

With Art Farmer

- 1962: Listen to Art Farmer and the Orchestra (Mercury)
- 1963: Interaction (Atlantic)
- 1963: Live at the Half-Note (Atlantic)
- 1964: To Sweden with Love (Atlantic) - released in Sweden as Visa På Annorlunda Vis
- 2008: The Complete Live Recordings (Gambit) - includes Live at the Half-Note plus a previously unofficially-released set recorded live in London on June 27, 1964

With Ella Fitzgerald

- 1960: Ella in Berlin: Mack the Knife (Verve)
- 1961: Ella in Hollywood (Verve) actually Herb Ellis; initially incorrectly attributed to Jim Hall

With Stan Getz

- 1962: Big Band Bossa Nova (Verve)
- 1966 Stan Getz & Arthur Fiedler at Tanglewood (Verve) also released as A Song After Sundown in 1988
- 1966: Voices (Verve, released 1967)
- 1968: What the World Needs Now: Stan Getz Plays Burt Bacharach and Hal David (Verve)

With Jimmy Giuffre

- 1957: The Jimmy Giuffre 3 (Atlantic)
- 1957-58 Hollywood & Newport 1957–1958 (Fresh Sound, released 1992)
- 1958: Trav'lin' Light (Atlantic)
- 1958: The Four Brothers Sound (Atlantic)
- 1958: Western Suite (Atlantic)
- 1959: Herb Ellis Meets Jimmy Giuffre (Verve) with Herb Ellis
- 1959 Seven Pieces (Verve)
- 1959: The Easy Way (Verve)
- 1959: Princess (Fini Jazz) Italian release - recorded at Adriano Theatre, Rome, Italy, June 19, 1959
- 1960: The Jimmy Giuffre Quartet in Person (Verve)
- 2006: Complete Studio Recordings (Gambit Spain)

=== H–M ===
With Bobby Hackett

- 1960: From the Jazz Vault (From the Jazz Vault, released 1979)

With Chico Hamilton

- 1955: Chico Hamilton Quintet featuring Buddy Collette (Pacific Jazz)
- 1955: The Original Chico Hamilton Quintet (World Pacific, released 1960)
- 1955: Live at the Strollers (Fresh Sound) released 2008
- 1956: Chico Hamilton Quintet in Hi Fi (Pacific Jazz)
- 1956: Chico Hamilton Trio (Pacific Jazz)
- 1957: Delightfully Modern (Jazztone) with the Laurindo Almeida Quartet
- 1959: Ellington Suite (World Pacific)

With Herbie Hancock

- 1967: Blow-Up (MGM)

With Ken Hanna and His Orchestra

- 1955: Jazz for Dancers (Capitol)

With Johnny Hartman

- 1964: I Just Dropped By to Say Hello (Impulse)

With Hampton Hawes

- 1956: All Night Session! Vol. 1 (Contemporary, released 1958)
- 1956: All Night Session! Vol. 2 (Contemporary, released 1958)
- 1956: All Night Session! Vol. 3 (Contemporary, released 1958)

With Lurlean Hunter

- 1960: Blue & Sentimental (Atlantic)

With Pete Jolly

- 1962: The Sensational Pete Jolly Gasses Everybody (Charlie Parker)

With Quincy Jones

- 1962: Big Band Bossa Nova (Mercury)
- 1963: Quincy Jones Plays Hip Hits (Mercury)
- 1964: Golden Boy (Mercury)
- 1965: Quincy Plays for Pussycats (Mercury)
- 1971: Smackwater Jack (A&M)

With Roger Kellaway

- 1963: A Portrait of Roger Kellaway (Regina/Fresh Sound)

With Lee Konitz

- 1959: You and Lee (Verve)
- 1967: The Lee Konitz Duets (Milestone Records)

With the Kronos Quartet

- 1986: Music of Bill Evans (Savoy)

With Rolf Kühn

- 1960: Rolf Kühn And His Sound Of Jazz (Urania Records)

With John Lewis

- 1956: Grand Encounter (Pacific Jazz)
- 1957: The John Lewis Piano (Atlantic)
- 1959: Odds Against Tomorrow (film soundtrack, United Artists)
- 1960: The Wonderful World of Jazz (Atlantic)
- 1962: Essence (Atlantic)

=== M–P ===
With Charlie Mariano

- 1963: A Jazz Portrait of Charlie Mariano (Regina Records)

With Gary McFarland

- 1962: The Jazz Version of "How to Succeed in Business without Really Trying" (Verve)
- 1963: The Gary McFarland Orchestra (Verve)

With Marian McPartland

- 2005: 85 Candles: Live in New York (Concord)

With Helen Merrill

- 1965: Deep in a Dream (Milestone) with Dick Katz - reissued in 1967 as The Feeling is Mutual
- 1968: A Shade of Difference (Milestone) with Dick Katz
- 1978: Something Special (Inner City)

"With "Big" Miller"

- 1961: Revelations and the Blues (Columbia Records)

With the Modest Jazz Trio

- 1960: Good Friday Blues (Disques Vogue)

With the Modern Jazz Quartet

- 1960: Third Stream Music (Atlantic) with the Jimmy Giuffre Three* and the Beaux Arts String Quartet

With Jack Montrose

- 1956: Blues and Vanilla (RCA Victor)
- 1957: The Horn's Full (RCA Victor)

With James Moody

- 1963: Great Day (Argo)

With Gerry Mulligan

- 1963: The Concert Jazz Band - Gerry Mulligan '63 (Verve)
- 1963: Night Lights (Philips)
- 1964: Butterfly with Hiccups (Limelight)

With Mark Murphy

- 1962: That's How I Love the Blues! (Riverside)

With Oliver Nelson

- 1963: Full Nelson (Verve)

With Anita O'Day

- Cool Heat (Verve, 1959)

With Orchestra U.S.A. Musical Director, John Lewis

- 1963: Debut (Colpix)

With Greg Osby

- 2000: The Invisible Hand (Blue Note)

With Freda Payne

- 1964: After the Lights Go Down Low and Much More!!! (Impulse!)

With Itzhak Perlman and André Previn

- 1980: A Different Kind of Blues (Angel)
- 1981: It's a Breeze (Angel)

=== R–Z ===
With Sonny Rollins

- 1962: The Bridge (RCA Victor)
- 1962: What's New? (RCA Victor)
- 1964: The Standard Sonny Rollins (RCA Victor)
- 2010: Road Shows Vol. 2 guest appearance on 1 track (EmArcy, released 2011)

With Shorty Rogers, Gary McFarland, Xavier Cugat

- 1993: Brazil (Saludos Amigos)

With Annie Ross

- 1959: Gypsy (World Pacific) with Buddy Bregman & His Orchestra
- 1959: A Gasser! (Capitol Records) with Zoot Sims

With Lalo Schifrin

- 1962: Piano, Strings and Bossa Nova (MGM)

With Zoot Sims

- 1959: Choice (World Pacific Records)
- 1962: New Beat Bossa Nova Vol. 1 (Colpix)
- 1962: New Beat Bossa Nova Vol. 2 (Colpix)

With Sonny Stitt

- 1964 Stitt Plays Bird (Atlantic)

With Carol Sloane

- 1962: Out of the Blue (Columbia, 1962)

With Bill Smith

- 1959: Folk Jazz (Contemporary)

With Billy Taylor

- 1962: Impromptu (Mercury)

With Big Joe Turner

- 1960: Big Joe Rides Again (Atlantic Records)

With Vi Velasco and Zoot Sims

- 1962: Cantando Bossa Nova Means Singing The Bossa Nova (Colpix Records)

With Ben Webster

- 1960: Ben Webster at the Renaissance (Contemporary)

== Music videos ==
- 1995: Legends Of Jazz Guitar Vol.3 VHS (Vestapol) Jim Hall, Tal Farlow et al. - reissued on DVD in 2002
- 1998: Jim Hall Jazz Guitar Master Class, Vol. 1: Jazz Basics / the Principles of Improvisation VHS (Alfred Music) also released in 2000 by Hal Leonard
- 1998: Jim Hall Jazz Guitar Master Class, Vol. 2: Advanced Concepts / Self Expression VHS (Alfred Music)
- 1998: Jim Hall Jazz Guitar Master Class, Vol. 3: Playing With a Group / Interaction VHS (Alfred Music)
- 1998: Jim Hall: A Life in Progress DVD (Rhapsody) produced by Bruce Ricker
- 2000: Jim Hall: Star Licks (Hal Leonard) ISBN 0793524415
- 2001: Jazz Casual: Art Farmer & Jim Hall VHS (Rhino) from January 1964 Ralph J. Gleason “Jazz Casual” TV appearance - reissued on DVD in 2003 by Idem with Gerry Mulligan Quartet video
- 2006: Jim Hall: Instructional DVD for Guitar DVD Hal Leonard ISBN 1423403304
- 2008: Sonny Rollins and Jim Hall: The Bridge DVD (Salt Peanuts) includes Sonny Rollins and Jim Hall (San Francisco 1962) and Jim Hall with Art Farmer (San Francisco 1964)
- 2009 (1973 & 1980): Jim Hall, Jimmy Raney, and Attila Zoller - Guitar Masters: Live in Germany 1973 & 1980 DVD (As Is) released 2009

== Music books ==
- 1990: Jim Hall - Exploring Jazz Guitar (Hal Leonard) ISBN 978-0793503926
- 1994: Jim Hall: Jazz Guitar Environments (Hal Leonard) ISBN 978-0793524396 transcriptions taken from Star Licks video
- 2005: The Best of Jim Hall (Hal Leonard) ISBN 978-0634080241
- 2006: Adam Perlmutter and Jim Hall - Jim Hall Guitar Signature Licks (Hal Leonard) ISBN 978-0634080258 book and CD combination
