= Jim Hall compositions =

Jim Hall
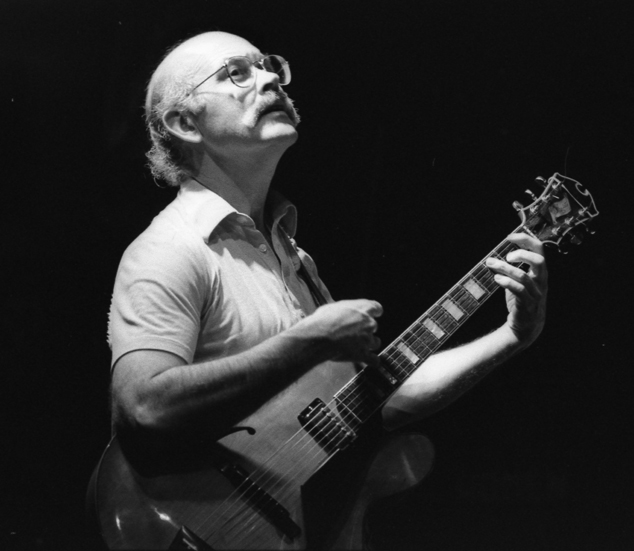
- Jim Hall at Keystone Korner, San Francisco 10/29/80

This is a list of compositions by Jim Hall and collaborators, each followed by the album or albums on which it appears.

All songs written by Jim Hall except as noted.

== List of compositions ==
=== 0–9 ===
"1953 'Thesis'"

- 1991: Jim Hall - Live At Town Hall Volume 1 (MusicMasters)

=== A ===
"A Merry Chase"

- 2006: Jim Hall and Geoffrey Keezer - Free Association (Contemporary)

"Abstract 1" ^{[C]}

- 2001: Jim Hall - Jim Hall & Basses (Telarc)

"Abstract 2" ^{[D]}

- 2001: Jim Hall - Jim Hall & Basses (Telarc)

"Abstract 3" ^{[D]}

- 2001: Jim Hall - Jim Hall & Basses (Telarc)

"Abstract 4" ^{[E]}

- 2001: Jim Hall - Jim Hall & Basses (Telarc)

"All Across The City"

- 1964: Jimmy Raney - Two Jims and Zoot (Mainstream)
- 1965: Paul Desmond - Glad to Be Unhappy (RCA Victor)
- 1966: Bill Evans - Intermodulation (Verve)
- 1989: Jim Hall - All Across The City (Concord)
- 1992: Jim Hall - Youkali (CTI)
- 1996: Bill Mays - Mays in Manhattan (Concord)
- 1999: Jeanfrançois Prins - All Around Town (TCB)
- 1999: Jim Hall and Pat Metheny - Jim Hall & Pat Metheny (Telarc)
- 2000: Jim Hall, Joe Lovano, George Mraz, Lewis Nash - Grand Slam (Telarc)
- 2003: Don Lanphere - Where Do You Start? (Origin)
- 2004: Carl Amundson - Guitarists! (Blue Line)
- 2007: Bill Charlap - Live at the Village Vanguard (Blue Note)
- 2008: Jim Hall and Bill Frisell - Hemispheres (ArtistShare)
- 2013: Owl Trio - Owl Trio (Losen Records)
- 2014: Kevin Fort - Red Gold (self-released)
- 2014: Satoshi Inoue - Plays Jim Hall (What's New)
- 2015: Tom Dempsey - Waltz New (Origin)

"And I Do"

- 1986: Jim Hall - Jim Hall's Three (Concord)
- 2001: Tina Angotti - Mirror (Tina Angotti Music)

"Arrowhead"

- 1957: Bob Brookmeyer - The Street Swingers (World Pacific)

"Art Song"

- 1998: Jim Hall - By Arrangement (Telarc)

"At Sea" ^{[H]}

- 2010: Jim Hall and Joey Baron - Conversations (ArtistShare)

=== B ===
"Ballad Painting" ^{[H]}

- 2010: Jim Hall and Joey Baron - Conversations (ArtistShare)

"Barbaro" ^{[H]}

- 2008: Jim Hall and Bill Frisell - Hemispheres (ArtistShare)

"Beijing Blues" ^{[G]}

- 2008: Jim Hall and Bill Frisell - Hemispheres (ArtistShare)

"Bent Blue"

- 2001: Jim Hall - Jim Hall & Basses (Telarc)
- 2004: Jim Hall - Magic Meeting (Contemporary)

"Bermuda Bye Bye"

- 1976: Jim Hall - Commitment (Horizon)

"Big Blues"

- 1978: Jim Hall and Red Mitchell – Jim Hall & Red Mitchell (Artists House)
- 1979: Art Farmer and Jim Hall - Big Blues (CTI)
- 1989: Jim Hall - All Across The City (Concord)
- 1995: René Mailhes - Gopaline (Iris)
- 2014: Charlie Haden and Jim Hall - Charlie Haden/Jim Hall (Impulse!)
- 2015: Tom Dempsey - Waltz New (Origin)

"Bimini"

- 1987: Michel Petrucciani - Power of Three (Blue Note)
- 1988: Jim Hall and Tom Harrell - These Rooms (DENON/Nippon Columbia)
- 2008: Jim Hall and Bill Frisell - Hemispheres (ArtistShare)

"Blue Joe"

- 1969: Jim Hall - It's Nice to Be With You (MPS)

"Bluesography"

- 1994: Jim Hall - Dedications & Inspirations (Telarc)

"Bon Ami"

- 1997: Bill Charlap - Distant Star (Criss Cross)
- 1995: Jim Hall - Dialogues (Telarc)

"Border Crossing"

- 2000: Jim Hall, Joe Lovano, George Mraz, Lewis Nash - Grand Slam (Telarc)

"Bottlenose Blues"

- 1986: Jim Hall - Jim Hall's Three (Concord)

=== C ===
"Calypso Joe"

- 1995: Jim Hall - Dialogues (Telarc)

"Canto Neruda"

- 2004: Jim Hall - Magic Meeting (Contemporary)

"Canto Nostálgico"

- 1994: Jim Hall - Dedications & Inspirations (Telarc)

"Careful"

- 1959: Jimmy Giuffre - The Easy Way (Verve)
- 1963: Gary Burton Something's Coming (RCA)
- 1972: Jim Hall - Where Would I Be? (Milestone)
- 1977: Jim Hall - Jazz Impressions of Japan (A&M)
- 1978: Gary Burton - Times Square (ECM)
- 1981: George Shearing and Jim Hall - First Edition (Concord)
- 1987: Michel Petrucciani - Power of Three (Blue Note)
- 1991: Jim Hall - Live At Town Hall Volume 2 (MusicMasters)
- 1998: Interstring - Odahoda (Igmod)
- 1998: Mark White - Tunch (Master Musicians)
- 2004: Vic Juris - While My Guitar Gently Weeps (SteepleChase)
- 2005: Jim Hall and Enrico Pieranunzi - Duologues (C.A.M.)
- 2012: Jim Hall - Live Vol. 2-4 (ArtistShare)
- 2014: Satoshi Inoue - Plays Jim Hall (What's New)
- 2015: Paul Hemmings - The Blues and the Abstract Uke (Leading Tone)
- 2015: Tom Dempsey - Waltz New (Origin)

"Chorale and Dance"

- 1985: Ron Carter and Jim Hall - Telephone (Concord)

"Chrissie"

- 1956: Chico Hamilton - Chico Hamilton Quintet in Hi Fi (Pacific Jazz)
- 1958: Gerry Mulligan - Complete at Newport 1958 (Disconforme / Rare Live) released in 2008

"Circus Dance"

- 1997: Jim Hall - Textures (Telarc)

"Cold Spring"

- 1999: Jim Hall and Pat Metheny - Jim Hall & Pat Metheny (Telarc)

"Consequently"

- 1993: Jim Hall - Something Special (MusicMasters)

"Conversations" ^{[H]}

- 2010: Jim Hall and Joey Baron - Conversations (ArtistShare)

"Cross Court"

- 1996: Ed Neumeister - Mohican & the Great Spirit (TCB)
- 1988: Jim Hall and Tom Harrell - These Rooms (DENON/Nippon Columbia)

=== D ===
"Dialogue"

- 1995: Jim Hall - Dialogues (Telarc)

"Down from Antigua"

- 1993: Jim Hall - Something Special (MusicMasters)
- 2014: Charlie Haden and Jim Hall - Charlie Haden/Jim Hall (Impulse!)

"Down the Line"

- 1976: Jim Hall - Commitment (Horizon)

"Dream Steps"

- 1995: Jim Hall - Dialogues (Telarc)
- 2001: Jim Hall - Jim Hall & Basses (Telarc)

"Drop Shot"

- 1989: Jim Hall - All Across The City (Concord)

Duologue 1-3 ^{[F]}

- 2005: Jim Hall and Enrico Pieranunzi - Duologues (C.A.M.)

=== E ===
"Echo"

- 1977: Jim Hall - Jazz Impressions of Japan (A&M)

"End the Beguine!"

- 2001: Jim Hall - Jim Hall & Basses (Telarc)
- 2006: Jim Hall and Geoffrey Keezer - Free Association (Contemporary)

"Entre-Nous"

- 1997: Jim Hall - Panorama: Live at the Village Vanguard (Telarc)

"Erb"

- 1968: Lee Konitz - The Lee Konitz Duets (Milestone)

=== F ===
"Fanfare"

- 1997: Jim Hall - Textures (Telarc)

"Free Piece" ^{[J]}

- 2005: Marian McPartland - 85 Candles: Live in New York (Concord)

"Frisell Frazzle"

- 1995: Jim Hall - Dialogues (Telarc)

"Furnished Flats"

- 1997: Jim Hall - Panorama: Live at the Village Vanguard (Telarc)
- 2004: Jim Hall - Magic Meeting (Contemporary)
- 2006: Jim Hall and Geoffrey Keezer - Free Association (Contemporary)

=== H ===
"Hawk"

- 1994: Jim Hall - Dedications & Inspirations (Telarc)

"Here Comes Jane"

- 1997: Jim Hall - Panorama: Live at the Village Vanguard (Telarc)

"Hide and Seek"

- 1986: Jim Hall - Jim Hall's Three (Concord)
- 1991: Jim Hall - Live At Town Hall Volume 2 (MusicMasters)

=== I ===
"I Know (Theme)"

- 1957: Chico Hamilton - Chico Hamilton Quintet (Pacific Jazz)
- 2002: Fred Lonberg-Holm - A Valentine for Fred Katz (Atavistic)
- 2005: Jorge Cutello - On Vacation... (Union De Musicos Independientes)

Improvisations, Nos. 1-5 ^{[I]}

- 1999: Jim Hall and Pat Metheny - Jim Hall & Pat Metheny (Telarc)

"In Repose" ^{[H]}

- 2010: Jim Hall and Joey Baron - Conversations (ArtistShare)

=== J ===
"Jane"

- 1989: Jim Hall - All Across The City (Concord)

"Jimlogue"

- 2005: Jim Hall and Enrico Pieranunzi - Duologues (C.A.M.)

"João"

- 1994: Jim Hall - Dedications & Inspirations (Telarc)
- 2014: Satoshi Inoue - Plays Jim Hall (What's New)

=== K ===
"Kyoto Bells"

- 1977: Jim Hall - Jazz Impressions of Japan (A&M)

=== L ===
"Light" ^{[B]}

- 1977: Jim Hall - Jazz Impressions of Japan (A&M)

"Little Blues"

- 1997: Jim Hall - Panorama: Live at the Village Vanguard (Telarc)

"Lookin' Up"

- 1999: Jim Hall and Pat Metheny - Jim Hall & Pat Metheny (Telarc)

"Lucky Thing"

- 1993: Jim Hall - Something Special (MusicMasters)

=== M ===
"Matisse"

- 1994: Jim Hall - Dedications & Inspirations (Telarc)

"Migration" ^{[G]}

- 2008: Jim Hall and Bill Frisell - Hemispheres (ArtistShare)

"Minotaur"

- 1972: Jim Hall - Where Would I Be? (Milestone)

"Miró"

- 1994: Jim Hall - Dedications & Inspirations (Telarc)

"Mister Blues"

- 1992: Jim Hall - Subsequently (MusicMasters)
- 1998: Jim Hall - Jazzpar Quartet + 4 (Contemporary)

"Monet"

- 1994: Jim Hall - Dedications & Inspirations (Telarc)
- 2010: Jim Hall and Joey Baron - Conversations (ArtistShare)

"Move It"

- 1964: Jimmy Raney - Two Jims and Zoot (Mainstream)

=== N ===
"No, You Don't"

- 1997: Jim Hall - Panorama: Live at the Village Vanguard (Telarc)

=== O ===
"Osaka Express"

- 1978: Jim Hall and Red Mitchell – Jim Hall & Red Mitchell (Artists House)

"Our Valentines" ^{[F]}

- 2005: Jim Hall and Enrico Pieranunzi - Duologues (C.A.M.)

"October Song"

- 1998: Jim Hall - By Arrangement (Telarc)
- 2006: Jim Hall and Geoffrey Keezer - Free Association (Contemporary)

"Ouagadoudou"

- 2006: Jim Hall and Geoffrey Keezer - Free Association (Contemporary)

=== P ===
"Painted Pig"

- 1997: Jim Hall - Panorama: Live at the Village Vanguard (Telarc)

"Pancho"

- 1992: Jim Hall - Subsequently (MusicMasters)

"Pan-O-Rama"

- 1997: Jim Hall - Panorama: Live at the Village Vanguard (Telarc)

"Passacaglia"

- 1997: Jim Hall - Textures (Telarc)

"Piece for Guitar & Strings"

- 1961: John Lewis - Jazz Abstractions (Atlantic)

"Pollock" ^{[H]}

- 2010: Jim Hall and Joey Baron - Conversations (ArtistShare)

=== Q ===
"Quadrologue"

- 1997: Jim Hall - Textures (Telarc)

"Quartet + 4"

- 1998: Jim Hall - Jazzpar Quartet + 4 (Contemporary)

=== R ===
"Ragman"

- 1997: Jim Hall - Textures (Telarc)

"Raney Day"

- 1957: Bob Brookmeyer - The Street Swingers (World Pacific)

"Reflections"

- 1997: Jim Hall - Textures (Telarc)

"Reinhardt" ^{[H]}

- 2010: Jim Hall and Joey Baron - Conversations (ArtistShare)

"Romaine"

- 1960: Modern Jazz Quartet - Pyramid (Atlantic)
- 1962: Bill Evans and Jim Hall - Undercurrent (United Artists)
- 1969: Jim Hall - It's Nice to Be With You (MPS)

"Running Out of Gas"

- 1994: Jim Hall - Unissued 1982-1992 (Musica Jazz)

=== S ===
"Safari" ^{[H]}

- 2010: Jim Hall and Joey Baron - Conversations (ArtistShare)

"Sanctus"

- 2000: Greg Osby - The Invisible Hand (Blue Note)

"Sam Jones"

- 2001: Jim Hall - Jim Hall & Basses (Telarc)

"Say Hello to Calypso"

- 2000: Jim Hall, Joe Lovano, George Mraz, Lewis Nash - Grand Slam (Telarc)

"Sazanami"

- 1997: Jim Hall - Textures (Telarc)

"Seseragi"

- 1994: Jim Hall - Dedications & Inspirations (Telarc)
- 2014: Satoshi Inoue - Plays Jim Hall (What's New)

"Siete-Cuartro"

- 1957: Chico Hamilton - Chico Hamilton Quintet (Pacific Jazz)

"Simple Samba"

- 1972: Jim Hall - Where Would I Be? (Milestone)
- 1984: The Rob McConnell Sextet - Old Friends/New Music (Unisson Records)
- 1995: Jack Pezanelli - Pleasured Hands (Brownstone)
- 2007: Carolbeth & David True - Two Times True (Victoria Company)
- 2015: Keith Scott - The Ensenada Project (self-released)

"Simple Things"

- 1995: Jim Hall - Dialogues (Telarc)

"Slam"

- 2000: Jim Hall, Joe Lovano, George Mraz, Lewis Nash - Grand Slam (Telarc)
- 2007: Joel Allouche - Close Meeting (Cristal Records)

"Snowbound"

- 1995: Jim Hall - Dialogues (Telarc)

"Something for Now

- 1977: Jim Hall - Jazz Impressions of Japan (A&M)

"Something Special"

- 1993: Jim Hall - Something Special (MusicMasters)
- 2000: Peter Eigenmann - Something Special (TCB)
- 2005: Steve Carryer Trio - From Where We Stand (3181)
- 2014: Satoshi Inoue - Plays Jim Hall (What's New)
- 2015: Tom Dempsey - Waltz New (Origin)

"Something Tells Me"

- 1988: Jim Hall and Tom Harrell - These Rooms (DENON/Nippon Columbia)

"Something to Wish For"

- 1997: Jim Hall - Panorama: Live at the Village Vanguard (Telarc)

"Steps"

- 1993: Jim Hall - Something Special (MusicMasters)

"Stern Stuff"

- 1995: Jim Hall - Dialogues (Telarc)

"Street Dance"

- 1994: Jim Hall - Dedications & Inspirations (Telarc)

"Subsequently"

- 1992: Jim Hall - Subsequently (MusicMasters)
- 2015: Tom Dempsey - Waltz New (Origin)

"Sweet Basil" ^{[A]}

- 1999: Jim Hall and Bob Brookmeyer - Live At The North Sea Jazz Festival (Challenge)

=== T ===
"Tango Loco"

- 2001: Jim Hall - Jim Hall & Basses (Telarc)

"These Rooms"

- 1988: Jim Hall and Tom Harrell - These Rooms (DENON/Nippon Columbia)

"Thesis"

- 1998: Jim Hall - Jazzpar Quartet + 4 (Contemporary)

"Three"

- 1986: Jim Hall - Jim Hall's Three (Concord)
- 1993: Jim Hall - Something Special (MusicMasters)
- 1994: Jim Hall - Unissued 1982-1992 (Musica Jazz)

"Time" ^{[8]}

- 2010: Jim Hall and Joey Baron - Conversations (ArtistShare)

"Tom Brown's Buddy"

- 1958: Shelly Manne - The Gambit (Contemporary)

"Travelogue" ^{[8]}

- 2010: Jim Hall and Joey Baron - Conversations (ArtistShare)

"Two's Blues"

- 1975: Jim Hall - Concierto (CTI)
- 1985: Ron Carter and Jim Hall - Telephone (Concord)
- 2005: Alex Domschot - Venusian Commute (Dreambox Media)

=== U ===
"Uncle Ed"

- 1995: Jim Hall - Dialogues (Telarc)
- 2010: Jim Hall and Joey Baron - Conversations (ArtistShare)

=== W ===
"Waiting to Dance"

- 1992: Jim Hall - Subsequently (MusicMasters)
- 1999: Jim Hall and Pat Metheny - Jim Hall & Pat Metheny (Telarc)
- 2008: Jim Hall and Bill Frisell - Hemispheres (ArtistShare)

"Walk Soft"

- 1976: Jim Hall - Commitment (Horizon)
- 2014: Satoshi Inoue - Plays Jim Hall (What's New)

"Waltz New"

- 1978: Jim Hall and Red Mitchell – Jim Hall & Red Mitchell (Artists House)
- 1987: Michel Petrucciani - Power of Three (Blue Note)
- 1995: Bill Charlap - Souvenir (Criss Cross)
- 1998: Jane Miller - Secret Pockets (Pink Bubble)
- 2000: Phillip DeGreg - Whirl Away (J Curve)
- 2001: Blue Wisp Big Band - 20th Anniversary (Sea Breeze)
- 2006: René Mailhes - Gitane (Iris Musique)
- 2011: Phil DeGreg Whirl Away (J Curve)
- 2014: Satoshi Inoue - Plays Jim Hall (What's New)
- 2015: Tom Dempsey - Waltz New (Origin)
- 2017: Brad Myers and Michael Sharfe - Sanguinaria (Hopefulsongs) (Colloquy)

"What If?" ^{[8]}

- 2010: Jim Hall and Joey Baron - Conversations (ArtistShare)

"Whistle Stop"

- 1994: Jim Hall - Dedications & Inspirations (Telarc)

"Whose Blues?"

- 1972: Ron Carter and Jim Hall - Alone Together (Milestone)

"Why Not Dance?"

- 1994: Jim Hall - Dedications & Inspirations (Telarc)

"Without Words"

- 1977: Jim Hall - Jazz Impressions of Japan (A&M)
- 1981: George Shearing and Jim Hall - First Edition (Concord)
- 2003: Daedelus - Rethinking the Weather (Mush)

=== Y ===
"Young One (for Debra)"

- 1969: Jim Hall - It's Nice to Be With You (MPS)
- 1977: Jim Hall - Jazz Impressions of Japan (A&M)
- 1986: John Basile - Quiet Passage (Pro Jazz)
- 1989: Jim Hall - All Across The City (Concord)
- 1992: Jim Witzel - Give and Take (Joplin & Sweeney Music)

== Notes ==
A. co-written with Bob Brookmeyer
B. co-written with Don Thompson and Terry Clarke
C. co-written with Charlie Haden
D.^{a} ^{b} co-written with Scott Colley and George Mraz
E. co-written with Scott Colley
F.^{a} ^{b} co-written with Enrico Pieranunzi
G.^{a} ^{b} co-written with Bill Frisell
H.^{a} ^{b} ^{c} ^{d} ^{e} ^{f} ^{g} ^{h} ^{i} ^{j} ^{k} co-written with Joey Baron
I. co-written with Pat Metheny
J. co-written with Marian McPartland
