= Intermodulation (album) =

1966 studio album by Bill Evans and Jim Hall

Studio album by Bill Evans and Jim Hall
- Released: Fall/Winter 1966
- Recorded: April 7 and May 10, 1966
- Studios: New York City and Van Gelder Studio, Englewood Cliffs, New Jersey
- Genre: Jazz
- Length: 32:22
- Labels: Verve; V6-8655
- Producer: Creed Taylor

Bill Evans chronology
Bill Evans at Town Hall (1966)	Intermodulation (1966)	A Simple Matter of Conviction (1967)

Jim Hall chronology
Two Jims and Zoot (1964)	Intermodulation (1966)	It's Nice to Be With You (1969)

Intermodulation is a 1966 jazz album by pianist Bill Evans and guitarist Jim Hall.

== Background ==
The recording is a follow-up to their highly acclaimed 1962 collaboration, Undercurrent. Evans and Hall had also recorded together a number of times in larger ensembles, including on John Lewis's Odds Against Tomorrow soundtrack (1959) and Jazz Abstractions (1960), Evans's Interplay (1963) and Loose Blues quintet sessions, and The Gary McFarland Orchestra (1963).

The album commences with two jazz standards, including Gershwin's aria "My Man's Gone Now," which Evans had notably recorded live during his famous 1961 Village Vanguard sessions. After that, the material is contemporary, with compositions by Claus Ogerman and Joe Zawinul as well as originals by both participants, including Evans's "Turn Out the Stars," which the pianist had previously recorded as part of a solo elegy for his father on Bill Evans at Town Hall.

Evans recalled, "I loved working with Jim Hall. The wonderful thing about him is that he is like a whole rhythm section." Likewise, Hall said, "He was so easy to work with. It was just like he read your mind all the time."

Verve Records released the album on CD in 1988.

== Reception ==
Professional ratings
Review scores
Source	Rating
AllMusic	3.5/5 stars
DownBeat	4/5 stars
The Rolling Stone Jazz Record Guide	4/5 stars
The Penguin Guide to Jazz Recordings	3.5/4 stars

Writing for AllMusic, music critic Michael G. Nastos notes of the album: "A duet recording between pianist Bill Evans and guitarist Jim Hall is one that should retain high expectations to match melodic and harmonic intimacies with brilliant spontaneous musicianship. Where this recording delivers that supposition is in the details and intricacy with which Evans and Hall work, guided by simple framings of standard songs made into personal statements that include no small amounts of innovation. ... At only 32 and a half minutes, it's disappointing there are no bonus tracks and/or additional material for a CD-length reissue, but Intermodulation still remains a precious set of music from these two great modern jazz musicians."

Evans's biographer Peter Pettinger notes that "the textural and creative amalgam of their earlier Undercurrent was perpetuated, the complementary interweaving of solo and supporting roles again done to perfection." He also homed in on a key track: "Evans's new masterpiece, 'Turn Out the Stars,' revealed its constructional qualities more readily in this more formal studio presentation [than on the live Bill Evans at Town Hall], although it was no less lyrical for that. Its long-spun line makes a satisfying arch of melody .... The delight for the listener throughout the record is the privilege of sitting in on two supreme artists playing for pleasure."

== Track listing ==
1. "I've Got You Under My Skin" (Cole Porter) – 3:24
2. "My Man's Gone Now" (George Gershwin, Ira Gershwin, DuBose Heyward) – 6:46
3. "Turn Out the Stars" (Bill Evans) – 7:37
4. "Angel Face" (Joe Zawinul) – 6:37
5. "Jazz Samba" (Claus Ogerman) – 3:10
6. "All Across the City" (Jim Hall) – 4:48

Tracks 3 and 6 recorded on April 7, 1966; the rest recorded on May 10, 1966.

== Personnel ==
- Bill Evans – piano
- Jim Hall – guitar

=== Additional personnel ===
- Creed Taylor – producer
- Rudy Van Gelder – engineer
- Paula Donahue – cover artist
