= Reg Schwager =

Canadian jazz guitarist and composer (born 1962)

- Born: May 7, 1962 (age 63); Leiden, Netherlands
- Genres: Jazz
- Occupations: Musician, composer, arranger
- Instrument: Guitar
- Years active: 1970s–present

Reg Schwager (born 7 May 1962) is a Dutch-born Canadian jazz guitarist, composer, and arranger.

Between 1994 and 2004 Schwager toured and recorded with the George Shearing Quintet. He has recorded or performed with many other notable artists including Don Thompson, Diana Krall, Diana Panton, Chet Baker and Mel Tormé.

Schwager was named Guitarist of the Year at the National Jazz Awards four consecutive times, from 2005 to 2008 and in 2021 he was appointed a Member of the Order of Canada for his contributions to Canadian jazz.

== Early life and education ==
Schwager was born in Leiden, Netherlands, in 1962. His family moved to New Zealand when he was three, where he began studying violin using the Suzuki method. The family later settled in Sudbury, Ontario, Canada, where Schwager learned recorder, flute, and piano before choosing guitar as his main instrument. By age fifteen he was performing locally in big bands, small groups, and in a duo with his sister, vocalist Jeannette Lambert.

In 1978 and 1979 he attended jazz workshops at the Banff Centre and the University of Toronto under Phil Nimmons, studying alongside musicians such as Renee Rosnes, Ralph Bowen, Dave McMurdo, and Pat LaBarbera. Early influences and mentors included Ed Bickert, Sonny Greenwich and Cecil Taylor. In 1979 Schwager moved to Toronto to pursue a professional jazz career. He became a regular performer at the city's Chelsea Inn.

== Career ==
Schwager has worked with a broad range of Canadian and international jazz musicians, including George Shearing, Peter Appleyard, Rob McConnell, Diana Krall, Diana Panton, Chet Baker and Mel Tormé. Between 1994 and 2004 he toured and recorded with the George Shearing Quintet.

He has appeared on numerous recordings as a sideman and has released several albums as leader, including Resonance (1986), Live at Mezzetta (2002), and Duets (2011). The album Duets features collaborations with bassists Don Thompson, Dave Young, Neil Swainson, and Pat Collins. With the Dave Young Trio he has released albums such as Border Town (1997), Trio Improvisations (2012), Songbook (2017) and Trouble in Mind (2019).

As a composer and arranger, Schwager has written hundreds of works, including many with lyrics by Jeannette Lambert. His big-band and string-orchestra arrangements have been recorded by ensembles such as the Dave McMurdo Jazz Orchestra and on saxophonist Mike Murley’s album The Melody Lingers On. Schwager was named Guitarist of the Year at the National Jazz Awards four consecutive times, from 2005 to 2008.

Schwager also was featured as a guest performer alongside other musicians such as Terry Clarke and Guido Basso on the 2009 album by Norm Amadio titled Norm Amadio and Friends.

Schwager has also studied and performed Brazilian music, working with musicians such as Guinga, Dori Caymmi, Jovino Santos Neto, and Hamilton de Holanda, particularly through the California–Brazil Camp.

In 2021 Schwager was appointed a Member of the Order of Canada for his contributions to Canadian jazz.

In April 2023 Schwager performed with saxophonist Allison Au for an International Jazz Day concert presented by JazzInToronto.

== Style and reception ==
Schwager's technique has been described as epitomizing the "archetypical, ultra-smooth style that watermarks so many Canadian guitarists' playing", with his "full-bodied, Jim Hall-like tone and perfect eight-note feel and phrasing". A Halifax Chronicle wrote of him: "Schwager has managed to become the hottest of rising Canadian musicians. Schwager’s solos sprout like vines in the jungle, tangled and tough, and winding through everything. His fluency and jazz literacy are encyclopedic. And his tasteful elaborations of the changes seem to end all too soon."

== Selected discography ==
As lead

- Resonance (1986), with the Reg Schwager Trio
- Border Town (1997), with the Dave Young Trio
- Live at Mezzetta (2002), with Don Thompson
- Composition with Three Figures (2003), with Michel Lambert, Pierre Côté
- Duets (2011), with bassists Pat Collins, Neil Swainson, Don Thompson, and Dave Young
- Trio Improvisations (2012), with the Dave Young Trio
- Yesterday Perhaps (2012), Diana Panton
- Arctic Passage (2014), with David Restivo
- Songbook (2017), with the Dave Young Trio
- Trouble in Mind (2019), with the Dave Young Trio
- Senza Resa (2023), with the Schwager–Oliver Quintet
- Who Are You? The Music of Kenny Wheeler (2023), Duncan Hopkins, with Ted Quinlan and Michel Lambert

As guest

- Norm Amadio and Friends (2009)

== Personal life ==
Schwager was married to cellist Kiki Misumi (1960–2018). He lives and works in Toronto, where he continues to compose, arrange, and perform.
