= Tommy Ambrose =

Canadian singer-songwriter

- Born: Thomas Ambrose; 19 October 1939 (age 86); Toronto, Ontario, Canada
- Genres: country music, lounge music, easy listening, gospel music, jazz, jingles
- Occupation: Singer-songwriter
- Years active: 1957-2016

Thomas Ambrose (born 19 October 1939) is a Canadian singer-songwriter.

Tommy Ambrose was born in Toronto, Ontario, Canada. At age four he began gospel singing at "Youth for Christ" rallies at Massey Hall, Maple Leaf Gardens, and elsewhere under the direction of Charles B. Templeton. Until he was sixteen he performed on gospel radio shows on 590 CKEY and 1010 CFRB. Turning to popular music he made his CBC TV debut on Cross-Canada Hit Parade. Shortly after that he hosted While We’re Young (summer replacement show) which then became The Tommy Ambrose Show for CBC television.

After several years of nightclub work, accompanied by pianist Norm Amadio, Tommy started singing radio and television commercials where he was discovered by Phil Ramone, world-renowned sound engineer – record producer and Patrick Williams – composer of many hit movie scores. He then sang in jingle studios in New York City for the next three years.

Ambrose then formed Trudel Productions with partner Larry Trudel – and through his own PC Productions he has written many successful jingles such as, "Blue Smiles Along with You" – Labatt Blue, "Wear a Mustache" – Milk, "Get Crackin" – Eggs (with lyricist Gary Gray, and others) plus a theme song for Global TV ("Point of View" with lyrics by Gray).

Ambrose was also commissioned by Canadian media icon Moses Znaimer to write a theme song for his fledgling TV station Citytv. Ambrose, working again with Gary Gray, came up with the song "People City", which became something of an anthem not just for the station but also the city of Toronto. Ambrose, Znaimer, former Toronto mayor David Crombie and others later appeared in a documentary about the song, produced by Ed Conroy's Retrontario operation.

Tommy wrote and performed the theme song "Open up the Dome and let the People Come In" for the opening of Skydome (lyrics by Bill Gough) – see video, CTV’s 1992 Barcelona Olympics Theme Song "There are No Strangers" sung by Michael Burgess and several theme songs for CBC TV movies. During these years Ambrose starred in the CBC's gospel series "Celebration" on radio and on television. Blaik Kirby in the Toronto Globe and Mail wrote of Ambrose's singing: "His lean-sounding voice is invariably in tune, his notes beautifully sustained and focused. There is a marvelous feeling of security as you listen." Tommy also performed occasionally in clubs and concerts with a nine-piece band led by Doug Riley.

In the 1980s Ambrose did another TV series for CBC titled, "Tommy Ambrose AND FRIENDS" featuring a 35-piece orchestra with guests like Jack Sheldon, James Moody and Sue Raney.

Tommy was the proprietor of Jingles, a downtown Toronto bar that he appeared at regularly with the nine-piece band led by Riley and on occasion presented many different jazz groups. In the mid 1990s Ambrose moved to Niagara-on-the-Lake where he started to develop a show "Songs Sinatra Taught Me" with writer Frank Peppiatt creator and writer of "A Man And His Music" for Sinatra – Ambrose performed this show in theatres in Toronto and across Ontario in the late 1990s into 2000.

Ambrose was nominated for a Juno Award in 1981 in the Best Jazz Album category for his album, Tommy Ambrose at Last, with the Doug Riley Band.

Ambrose was also a guest vocalist on the 2009 album by Norm Amadio titled, Norm Amadio and Friends, featuring vocalists such as Marc Jordan.

== Discography ==
=== Albums ===
Year	Album
1962	Young Tommy Ambrose
1971	Fuzzy Love (with Bruno Gerussi)
1977	Sweet Times
1979	At Last (with the Doug Riley Band)
2014	Songs Sinatra Taught Me

=== Singles ===
Year	Single	Chart Positions	
Year	Single	CAN Country	CAN AC
1973	"People City"	—	44
1974	"Our Summer Song"	19	—
1976	"The Night Time and My Baby"	47	—

== Filmography ==
This list is incomplete

- 1957: Cross-Canada Hit Parade (CBC)
- 1961–1963: The Tommy Ambrose Show
- 1972: Hee Haw
- 1975–1976: Celebration (CBC)
