= Live in Tokyo =

Live in Tokyo may refer to:

== Albums ==
- Live in Tokyo, by Miriam Makeba, 1968
- Live in Tokyo (Gary Burton album), 1971
- Live in Tokyo (Weather Report album), 1972
- Live in Tokyo (The Thad Jones/Mel Lewis Orchestra album), 1974
- Live in Tokyo (Charles Tolliver album), 1974
- Live in Tokyo (Barry Harris album), 1976
- Live in Tokyo (Charles McPherson album), 1976
- Live in Tokyo (Jimmy Raney album), 1976
- Live in Tokyo, by Jim Hall, 1976
- Live in Tokyo, by Amazing Blondel, 1977
- Live in Tokyo (Wishbone Ash album), 1979
- Live In Tokyo (Public Image Limited album), 1983
- Live in Tokyo, by Psychic TV, 1986
- Live in Tokyo, by Shellac, 1994
- Man-Tora! Live in Tokyo, by the Manhattan Transfer, 1996
- Cha Cha 2000 - Live in Tokyo 1996 Vol. 1, by La! Neu?, 1998
- Live in Tokyo 1996 Vol. 2, by La! Neu?, 1999
- Live in Tokyo (Hughes Turner Project album), 2002
- Live in Tokyo (Brad Mehldau album), 2004
- Live in Tokyo 25th November 2005, by Underworld, 2005
- Live in Tokyo, by Swing Out Sister, 2005
- G3: Live in Tokyo, 2005
- Live in Tokyo (Stevie Ray Vaughan album), 2006
- Live in Tokyo, by Fazıl Say, 2006
- Live in Tokyo, by Wig Wam, 2007

== Videos ==
- Images and Words: Live in Tokyo, by Dream Theater, 1993
- Live in Tokyo, by Queensrÿche, 1985
