= It's Nice to Be With You =

"Nice to Be With You" may refer to:

- It's Nice to Be With You, a 1969 album by Jim Hall.
- "It's Nice to Be With You," a 1968 song by The Monkees.
- "Nice to Be with You", a song by The Gallery
