= Undercurrent (Bill Evans and Jim Hall album) =

1962 studio album by Bill Evans and Jim Hall

Studio album by Bill Evans and Jim Hall
- Released: August 1962
- Recorded: April 24 & May 14, 1962
- Studio: Sound Makers, New York City
- Genre: Jazz
- Length: 30:12
- Label: United Artists
- Producer: Alan Douglas

Bill Evans chronology
Waltz for Debby (1961)	Undercurrent (1962)	Moon Beams (1962)

Bill Evans and Jim Hall chronology
Undercurrent (1962)	Intermodulation (1966)

Alternative cover
- Blue Note 1988 reissue

Undercurrent is a 1962 jazz album by the pianist Bill Evans and the guitarist Jim Hall. The two artists collaborated again in 1966 on the album Intermodulation.

== Background ==
Reeling from the death of Scott LaFaro in early July 1961, Evans did not record or even play the piano for several months. When he did start recording again in October, it was as a sideman in projects with Mark Murphy, Herbie Mann, Dave Pike, and Tadd Dameron. Only with this album, recorded in the spring of 1962, did he emerge again as a leader.

His collaborator, Jim Hall, recalled:

The circle that George Russell would have over to his place included Jimmy Giuffre, Bob Brookmeyer, Gil Evans, Zoot Sims, Bill and others. It didn't seem strange to me to do records together. Somebody always had a record date. I mean, that is what we did. It was very exciting in those sessions. We weren't thinking about "jazz history."

Later in 1962, Evans and Hall would record together with larger ensembles on the albums Interplay, Loose Blues (which was released only after Evans's death), and The Gary McFarland Orchestra.

== Repertoire ==
The album opens with a cover of a favorite jazz vehicle, "My Funny Valentine" by Richard Rodgers, which as Keith Shadwick notes is "normally performed by jazz musicians as a moody ballad" but here is "the single up-tempo romp on the album"; it was also actually "the last-recorded piece on the date". The program includes other jazz standards along with John Lewis's "Skating in Central Park" from his jazz soundtrack for the film Odds Against Tomorrow (1959), on which both Evans and Hall had played. No Evans originals are included on the album, but the duo performs Hall's "Romain", which had previously been recorded by Lewis's Modern Jazz Quartet for the album Pyramid (1960).

== Performance ==
Evans biographer Peter Pettinger notes: "There is a hazard attached to combining piano and guitar, both essentially chordal instruments. Although jazz musicians use alternative chords with ease, the simultaneous choice of two valid but different chords may well not work. Evans and Hall had the intelligence and mutual awareness to escape this snare. And to avoid textural overcrowding, both were conscious of the value of space, every note being made to count in their joint tapestry."

== Cover and releases ==
The front cover image for Undercurrent is Toni Frissell's photograph "Weeki Wachee Spring, Florida", which Shadwick describes as "stunning". The album was originally released on United Artists, then reissued by Solid State in 1968. Later, the album was reissued on the Blue Note label; both Blue Note and United Artists Records have been part of the same catalog for many decades. The original LP and the first CD reissue in 1988 featured a cropped, blue-tinted version, overlaid with the title and the Blue Note logo in white; but for the 2002 24-bit remastered CD reissue, the image was restored to its original black-and-white coloration and size, without lettering. The CD reissues also include four bonus tracks, including alternate takes of "My Funny Valentine" and "Romain."

== Reception ==
Professional ratings
Review scores
Source	Rating
DownBeat	(Original Lp release)
AllMusic	4/5 stars
All About Jazz	4.5/5 stars
The Penguin Guide to Jazz Recordings	4/4 stars

In his November 26, 1962, review for DownBeat magazine jazz critic Pete Welding states: "This collaboration between Evans and Hall has resulted in some of the most beautiful, thoroughly ingratiating music it has been my pleasure to hear."

AllMusic critic Scott Yanow notes: "Both Evans and Hall had introspective and harmonically advanced styles along with roots in hard-swinging bebop. There is more variety than expected on the fine set with some cookers, ballads, waltzes, and even some hints at classical music. Recommended."

Pettinger comments: "One of the mysteries of music that defies analysis is the ability of two musicians to play especially well together, to feel and instinctively adapt to what the other is doing. [This album] exemplified the secret. In this sublime meeting, the artists shared a common ground of musical values, Hall confessing to having long been influenced by Evans. Both, too, had a strong feeling for chamber music."

Shadwick adds: "Each musician's special skills at improvisatory counterpoint and sensitive accompaniment are prominent throughout this mostly ruminative date. Their equal but differing abilities in caressing a melodic line through gradations of touch and tiny rhythmic displacements keep the listener fascinated at each new unfolding of a song's deeper levels of meaning." He also singled out the performance of "Dream Gypsy" as "one of the most poignant and evocative of the set".

== Track listing ==
Side one

1. "My Funny Valentine" (Richard Rodgers, Lorenz Hart) – 5:21
2. "I Hear a Rhapsody" (Jack Baker, George Fragos, Dick Gasparre) – 4:36
3. "Dream Gypsy" (Judith Veevers)– 4:33

Side two

1. "Romain" (Jim Hall) – 5:19
2. "Skating in Central Park" (John Lewis) – 5:19
3. "Darn That Dream" (Eddie DeLange, Jimmy Van Heusen) – 5:04

Bonus tracks on 2002 Blue Note CD reissue:

7. "Stairway to the Stars" (Matty Malneck, Mitchell Parish, Frank Signorelli) – 5:38
8. "I'm Getting Sentimental Over You" (George Bassman, Ned Washington) – 4:13
9. "My Funny Valentine" [Alternate Take] – 6:54
10. "Romain" [Alternate Take] – 5:24

Recorded on April 24 (#2, 7, 8) and May 14 (all others), 1962.

== Personnel ==
- Bill Evans – piano
- Jim Hall – guitar

== See also ==
- John Lewis, Odds Against Tomorrow (Original Music from the Motion Picture Soundtrack) (1959)
