= Duncan Hopkins =

Duncan Hopkins (born 21 September 1967) is an English-born jazz composer and musician who plays double bass and electric bass.

== Early life and education ==
Hopkins was born in Coventry, West Midlands. His father was a trombone player and his mother a pianist. He started his musical education at Pattison College, where his mother taught music. The family then moved to St. Catharines, Ontario, Canada in 1971, where he remained until he finished formal studies at Lakeport Secondary School and Brock University (1987–1989).

After acquiring his bachelor's degree in business economics, Hopkins moved to Montreal to study with bassist Michel Donato, first within the confines of McGill University and then later privately. He then attended the Banff School of Fine Arts to study with Rufus Reid, Kenny Wheeler, Steve Coleman.

== Career ==
Hopkins returned briefly to St. Catharines in 1992 and won an Ontario Arts Council Award to live and study in New York with Dave Holland. During that year, however, his parents succumbed to cancer and he returned to Canada and moved to Toronto. Over the years Hopkins has performed with Diana Krall, Peter Appleyard, Warren Vache, Rob McConnell, Robert Farnon, John Hicks, Mark Murphy, Lester Bowie, Sam Rivers, Kenny Wheeler, Don Thompson, Moe Koffman, Norman Amadio, Scott Hamilton, Edward Simon and others.

Hopkins also toured Britain and continental Europe with the Bobby Watson All Stars featuring Bobby Watson on alto sax, Bruce Barth on piano, and Stephen Keogh on drums.
