= The Solo Sessions, Vol. 2 =

Studio album by Bill Evans
- Released: 1992
- Recorded: January 10, 1963; New York City
- Genre: Jazz
- Length: 42:17
- Label: Milestone; MCD 9195-2
- Producer: Orrin Keepnews

Bill Evans chronology
The Solo Sessions, Vol. 1 (1963)	The Solo Sessions, Vol. 2 (1992)	The Gary McFarland Orchestra (1963)

Professional ratings
Review scores
Source	Rating
AllMusic	3/5 stars
The Penguin Guide to Jazz	3.5/4 stars

The Solo Sessions, Vol. 2 is an album by jazz pianist Bill Evans, released in 1992.

Evans recorded The Solo Sessions, Vol. 1 and Vol. 2 at the same session, on January 10, 1963 and the tracks were originally released as part of Bill Evans: The Complete Riverside Recordings in 1984.

== Track listing ==
1. "All the Things You Are" (Hammerstein II, Kern) – 9:10
2. "Santa Claus Is Coming to Town" (Coots, Gillespie) – 4:33
3. "I Loves You Porgy" (Gershwin, Gershwin, Heyward) – 5:50
4. "What Kind of Fool Am I?" [Take 2] (Bricusse, Newley) – 6:49
5. "Love Is Here to Stay" (Gershwin, Gershwin) – 4:01
6. "Ornithology" (Harris, Parker) – 5:33
7. "Medley: Autumn in New York/How About You?" (Duke, Freed, Lane) – 6:21
