= Celebration (TV program) =

Canadian music television program

- Genre: Music
- Presented by: Tommy Ambrose
- Country of origin: Canada
- Original language: English
- No. of seasons: 1

Production
- Producers: Bill Davis; Sam Lovullo
- Running time: 30 minutes
- Production company: Celebration Productions

Original release
- Network: CBC Television
- Release: 23 September 1975 – 25 May 1976

Celebration is a Canadian music television program that aired on CBC Television from 1975 to 1976.

== Premise ==
Tommy Ambrose hosted this program of inspirational music with the eight-member house group, the Celebration Choir. Doug Riley provided musical arrangements. Episodes included interviews on spirituality-related topics.

== Scheduling ==
This half-hour program was broadcast on Tuesdays at 7:30 p.m. (Eastern) from 23 September 1975 to 25 May 1976.
