= The Solo Sessions, Vol. 1 =

Studio album by Bill Evans
- Released: 1989
- Recorded: January 10, 1963; New York City
- Genre: Jazz
- Length: 42:04
- Label: Milestone; M-9170
- Producer: Orrin Keepnews

Bill Evans chronology
Loose Blues (1963)	The Solo Sessions, Vol. 1 (1989)	The Solo Sessions, Vol. 2 (1963)

Professional ratings
Review scores
Source	Rating
AllMusic	2.5/5 stars
The Penguin Guide to Jazz	4/4 stars

The Solo Sessions, Vol. 1 is an album by jazz pianist Bill Evans, released in 1989.

Evans recorded The Solo Sessions, Vol. 1 and Vol. 2 at the same session, on January 10, 1963 and the tracks were originally released as part of Bill Evans: The Complete Riverside Recordings in 1984.

== Track listing ==
1. "What Kind of Fool Am I?" [Take 1] (Bricusse, Newley) – 6:15
2. "Medley: My Favorite Things/Easy to Love/Baubles, Bangles, & Beads" (Borodin, Wright, Forrest) – 12:30
3. "When I Fall in Love" (Heyman, Young) – 3:04
4. "Medley: Spartacus Love Theme/Nardis" (Alex North), (Miles Davis) – 8:40
5. "Everything Happens to Me" (Adair, Dennis) – 5:44
6. "April in Paris" (Duke, E. Y. Harburg) – 5:51
