= Boris Berlin =

Canadian musician (1907–2001)

Boris Berlin OC OOnt (27 May 1907 – 24 March 2001) was a Canadian pianist, music educator, arranger, and composer of Russian birth. He is primarily remembered for his work within the field of piano pedagogy, having published an extensive amount of material in that area and teaching a large number of notable pianists. His more than 20 books on the subject of piano pedagogy sold more than 4 million copies. In 2000 he was made an Officer of the Order of Canada with the citation "Known as the teacher of teachers, he profoundly influenced musical instruction in our country. Having taught some of Canada's most illustrious musicians, he was known for his extensive contribution to pedagogical material and for his piano pieces for young performers."

== Allegations of sexual abuse ==
In February 2026, The Toronto Star published a first-person account by a former student who alleged that Berlin sexually abused her during piano lessons when she was 15 years old while studying at the Royal Conservatory of Music. Further reporting by The Toronto Star revealed similar allegations of sexual abuse brought forward by the family of another former student.

== Life and career ==
Born in Kharkov, Russian Empire, Berlin began his professional musical education at the Sevastopol Conservatory. From 1923 to 1925 he attended the Conservatoire de Genève and then pursued further studies at the Berlin Hochschule für Musik where he was a pupil of Mark Hambourg and Leonid Kreutzer. He began his career in Europe performing as a concert pianist, mainly in Germany and Switzerland.

Berlin toured the Ontario region in chamber music concerts with a trio in 1925. In the same year, he took a position at the Hambourg Conservatory of Music in Toronto where he remained through 1927. In 1928 he joined the piano faculty at the Toronto Conservatory of Music (now The Royal Conservatory of Music) where he remained for several decades. At his position in the conservatory, he shifted focus to writing Canadian pedagogical works for music students and published his first collaboration with Ernest MacMillan in 1930. He became a naturalized Canadian citizen in 1931. In 1970 he joined the faculty of the University of Toronto. He also served as examiner, lecturer, and festival adjudicator throughout his career. Among his notable pupils are the classical pianists Louis Applebaum, Gwen Beamish MacMillan, Victor Alexeeff, Bernadene Blaha, Keith MacMillan, Andrew Markow, Christina Petrowska-Quilico, Dorothy Sandler, Geraldine Shuster Leder, Adrienne Shannon, Peter C. Simon, Lydia Wong, and the jazz pianists Norman Amadio and Rudy Toth as well as the conductor Charles Olivieri-Munroe. He composed many pieces including "March of the Goblins", "Monkeys in the tree", and "Jets on Parade".

The Royal Conservatory of Music named Berlin a "Heritage Teacher" in a ceremony on 6 April 1990. In 1992 he was awarded the 125th Anniversary of the Confederation of Canada Medal and was made a Member of the Order of Ontario. In 2000 he became an Officer of the Order of Canada, but died in March 2001 in Toronto before the ceremony honouring him with this title was held.
