= Norm Amadio and Friends =

Studio album by Norm Amadio and Friends
- Released: 2009
- Genre: Jazz
- Length: 39:45
- Label: Panda Digital
- Producer: Andrew A. Melzer

Norm Amadio and Friends is a 2009 self-titled studio album by Norman Amadio, produced and composed by Andrew A. Melzer, arranged by Peter Cardinali, and featuring vocalists such as Jackie Richardson, Marc Jordan, and Tommy Ambrose (who also worked with Melzer on another album After Hours 1966). The songs on the album feature accompaniment by the Pandamonium Strings. The album features 7 songs with original lyrics by Andrew A. Melzer., and was released under the Panda Digital label on CD.

== Reception and nomination ==
The album received generally favourable reviews. A review on the website That Canadian Magazine called the album a "big success" with producer Melzer saying "it turned out to be a set of fantastic sessions. Peter Cardinali wrote fabulous charts and John “Beetle” Bailey did a superb job recording and mixing the album. I was blessed to have had singers Jackie Richardson, Marc Jordan and players: Norm Amadio, Rosemary Galloway, Terry Clarke, Guido Basso, Phil Dwyer, Reg Schwager and Mat Pataki", with 5 songs from the album receiving a nomination for the American Songwriting Award. A review from the newspaper Toronto Star rated it as "one of the top albums of the year". The website The Whole Note described the album as "a classy, stylish treatment of a dozen songs... top-quality jazz ornamented with unexpected zesty freshness".

== Track listing ==
1. "I Love You That Way" (Marc Jordan - vocals) - 3:51
2. "Words" (Guido Basso - flugelhorn) - 2:46
3. "Out of the Cool" (Guido Basso - flugelhorn, Phil Dwyer - saxophone) - 3:30
4. " 'Round the Bend" (Jackie Richardson - vocals) - 2:43
5. "The World is Going to the Dogs" (Reg Schwager - guitar, Phil Dwyer - saxophone) - 2:06
6. "All I Need Is You" (Jackie Richardson - vocals) - 3:21
7. "She Smiled" (Guido Basso - trumpet, The Pandamonium Strings - accompaniment) - 3:43
8. "Lower Chakra Love" (Phil Dwyer - saxophone, Marc Jordan - vocals) - 3:55
9. "My Love Can't Wait" (Phil Dwyer - saxophone, The Pandamonium Strings - accompaniment) - 4:17
10. "My Itchy Beard" (Norm Amadio Trio) - 2:14
11. "You're the One for Me" (Tommy Ambrose - vocals) - 4:32
12. "The Skies" - 2:39

== Personnel ==
- Norm Amadio - piano
- Marc Jordan, Jackie Richardson, Terry Ambrose - vocals
- Rosemary Galloway - bass
- Terry Clarke - drums
- Guido Basso - trumpet/flugelhorn
- Phil Dwyer - saxophone
- Reg Schwager - electric/acoustic guitar
- Mat Pataki - percussion
- The Pandamonium Strings
