= The Golden Striker =

Studio album by John Lewis
- Released: 1960
- Recorded: February 12, 15–16, 1960; NYC
- Genre: Jazz
- Label: Atlantic; SD 1334
- Producer: Nesuhi Ertegun

John Lewis chronology
Odds Against Tomorrow (Soundtrack) (1959)	The Golden Striker (1960)	The Wonderful World of Jazz (1961)

The Golden Striker (subtitled Music for Brass & Piano by John Lewis Conducted & Played by the Composer) is an album in the third stream music genre composed by John Lewis recorded for the Atlantic label in 1960.

== Reception ==
Professional ratings
Review scores
Source	Rating
Allmusic	2/5 stars

The Allmusic review by Scott Yanow stated: "One of the less interesting John Lewis 'third-stream' projects" and "Although the pianist takes a few solos, the music is mostly written out and frankly rather dull".

== Track listing ==
All compositions by John Lewis

1. "Fanfare I" – 0:38
2. "Piazza Navona" – 6:28
3. "Odds Against Tomorrow" – 7:45
4. "Fanfare II" – 0:33
5. "Pulcinella" – 4:15
6. "Fanfare II" – 0:23
7. "The Golden Striker" – 4:55
8. "Piazza di Spagna" – 4:33
9. "Fanfare I" – 0:38
10. "La Cantatrice" – 5:03

== Personnel ==
- John Lewis – piano, conductor
- Melvyn Broiles, Bernie Glow, Alan Kiger, Joe Wilder – trumpet
- David Baker, Dick Hixson – trombone
- Ray Alonge, John Barrows, Al Richman, Gunther Schuller – French horn
- Jay McAllister (tracks 1, 3–7, 9 & 10), Harvey Phillips (tracks 2 & 8) – tuba
- George Duvivier – bass
- Connie Kay – drums
