= Big Blues (Art Farmer album) =

Studio album by Art Farmer and Jim Hall
- Released: 1979
- Recorded: February 2–3, 1978
- Studio: Electric Lady Studios, New York City
- Genre: Jazz
- Length: 34:37
- Label: CTI; CTI 7083
- Producer: Creed Taylor

Art Farmer chronology
Art Farmer Live in Tokyo (1977)	Big Blues (1979)	Yama (1979)

Jim Hall chronology
Commitment (1976)	Big Blues (1979)	First Edition (1981)

Big Blues is an album by American flugelhornist Art Farmer and guitarist Jim Hall, featuring performances recorded in 1978 and released on the CTI label. It was produced by Creed Taylor.

== Reception ==
The AllMusic review stated: "Since Farmer and Hall have long had very complementary styles (both being lyrical, harmonically advanced and thoughtful in their improvisations), it is little surprise that this set is a complete success".

DownBeat assigned the album 4 stars. Reviewer Ben Sandmel wrote, "Guitarist Hall shares Farmer’s subtle, low key format, while Mike Mainieri’s vibes give the set speed, fire and funk. Steve Gadd and Mike Moore are impeccable throughout on drums and bass, pushing or laying back as the moment demands, listening carefully and contributing their own dynamic accents".

Professional ratings
Review scores
Source	Rating
AllMusic	4/5 stars
DownBeat	4/5 stars
The Rolling Stone Jazz Record Guide	2/5 stars

== Track listing ==
1. "Whisper Not" (Benny Golson) - 8:44
2. "A Child Is Born" (Thad Jones) - 7:40
3. "Big Blues" (Jim Hall) - 7:23
4. "Pavane for a Dead Princess" (Maurice Ravel) - 10:50

== Personnel ==
- Art Farmer - flugelhorn
- Jim Hall - guitar
- Michael Moore - bass
- Steve Gadd - drums
- Mike Mainieri - vibraphone
- David Matthews - arranger
