= The Jazz Version of "How to Succeed in Business without Really Trying" =

Studio album by Gary McFarland
- Released: 1962
- Recorded: November 8, 14–15, 1961 in New York City
- Genre: Jazz
- Label: Verve - 8443
- Producer: Creed Taylor

Gary McFarland chronology
The Jazz Version of "How to Succeed in Business without Really Trying" (1962)	The Gary McFarland Orchestra (1963)

Professional ratings
Review scores
Source	Rating
AllMusic	4/5 stars

The Jazz Version of "How to Succeed in Business Without Really Trying" is a 1962 album by arranger Gary McFarland of songs from the Frank Loesser musical How to Succeed in Business Without Really Trying. The album was McFarland's debut as a main artist.

== Track listing ==
1. "How to Succeed In Business Without Really Trying" - 6:11
2. "Paris Original" - 3:50
3. "Love from a Heart of Gold" - 3:30
4. "Grand Old Ivy" - 3:45
5. "Brotherhood of Man" - 5:17
6. "I Believe In You" - 6:03
7. "Grand Old Ivy Part II" - 3:30
8. "Happy to Keep His Dinner Warm" - 4:27

All music composed by Frank Loesser.

== Personnel ==
- Bernie Glow, Clark Terry, Doc Severinsen, Herb Pomeroy, Joe Newman - trumpet
- Willie Dennis, Billy Byers, Bob Brookmeyer - trombone
- Oliver Nelson, Al Cohn - tenor saxophone
- Sol Schlinger - baritone saxophone
- Phil Woods - alto saxophone
- Eddie Wasserman - clarinet
- Kenny Burrell, Jim Hall - guitar
- Hank Jones - piano
- Joe Benjamin, George Duvivier - double bass
- Osie Johnson, Mel Lewis - drums
- Gary McFarland - arranger, Conductor, vibraphone
