= Steve LaSpina =

American jazz bassist (born 1954)

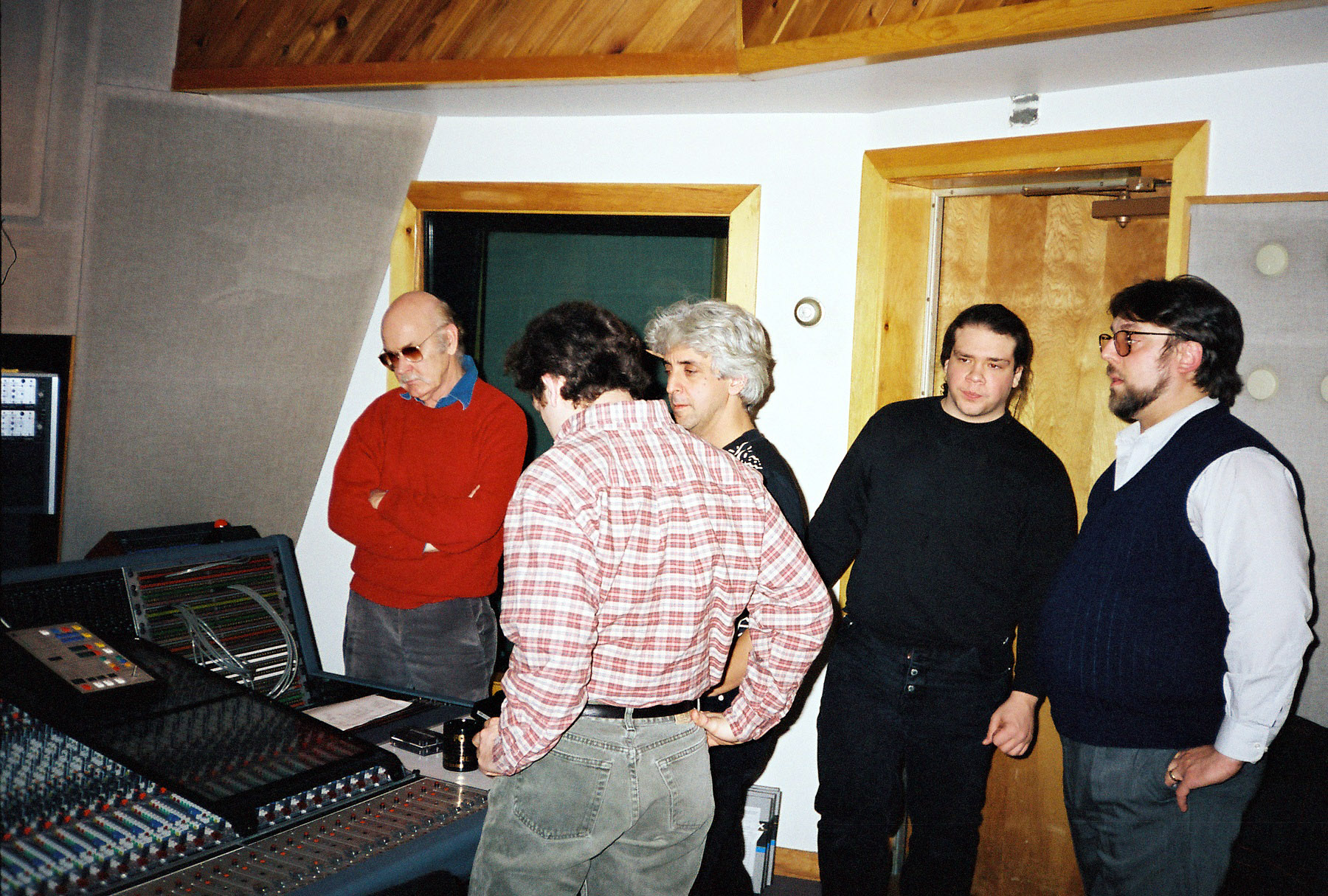

Steven Frank LaSpina (born March 24, 1954) is an American jazz bassist who plays both upright and electric bass.

== Life and career ==
Steve LaSpina was born in Wichita Falls, Texas; his father and grandfather both played in dance bands. He attended the University of Illinois and DePaul University, and first began playing professionally in Chicago in the 1970s. He played with Bunky Green, Larry Novak, Joe Daley (1975–79), and Chet Baker (1978). In 1978 he also began working with Marian McPartland, with whom he would collaborate until 1986.

He moved to New York City in 1979 and played with Mel Lewis's orchestra (1978–82), Stan Getz (1986-87), Jim Hall (from 1988), Andy LaVerne (from 1989), and Benny Carter (latter half of the 1990s). Aside from these associations, LaSpina has played with Toots Thielemans, Joe Williams, Dave Liebman, Richie Beirach, Bob Brookmeyer, Al Cohn, Zoot Sims, Pat Martino, and Tommy Flanagan. He has taught bass and improvisation at New York University and the College of St. Rose. LaSpina is currently on the faculty at William Paterson University.

== Discography ==
=== As leader ===
- New Horizons (SteepleChase, 1992)
- Eclipse (SteepleChase, 1994)
- When I'm Alone (SteepleChase, 1995)
- Story Time (SteepleChase, 1996)
- When Children Smile (SteepleChase, 1997)
- Distant Dream (SteepleChase, 1998)
- The Bounce (SteepleChase, 2000)
- Remember When (SteepleChase, 2003)
- Play Room (SteepleChase, 2006)
- Moments (SteepleChase, 2008)
- Destiny (SteepleChase, 2011)
- A Change in the Weather (SteepleChase, 2020)
- Spit Fire, Spout Rain (Self-released, 2023)

=== As sideman ===
With Benny Carter

- Benny Carter Songbook (MusicMasters, 1997)
- Benny Carter Songbook Volume II (MusicMasters, 1997)
- New York Nights (MusicMasters 1997)

With Chris Connor

- Live (Applause, 1983)
- Lover Come Back to Me: Live at Sweet Basil (Evidence, 1995)
- Haunted Heart (HighNote, 2001)

With Joe Diorio

- More Than Friends (RAM, 1994)
- Narayani (RAM, 1997)
- I Remember You (RAM, 1998)

With Jim Hall

- Jim Hall's Three (Concord Jazz, 1986)
- These Rooms (Denon, 1988)
- All Across the City (Concord Jazz, 1989)
- Live at Town Hall Vol. 1 (Musicmasters, 1991)
- Live at Town Hall Vol. 2 (Musicmasters, 1991)
- Subsequently (MusicMasters, 1992)
- Something Special (MusicMasters, 1993)
- Live at Birdland (ArtistShare, 2012)

With Morgana King

- Simply Eloquent (Muse, 1986)
- Stardust (CBS/Sony 1987)
- Another Time, Another Space (Muse, 1988)

With Andy LaVerne

- Severe Clear (SteepleChase, 1990)
- Double Standard (Triloka, 1993)
- First Tango in New York (Musidisc, 1993)
- Now It Can Be Played (SteepleChase, 1993)
- Standard Eyes (SteepleChase, 1994)
- Glass Ceiling (SteepleChase, 1994)
- Serenade to Silver (SteepleChase, 1996)
- Stan Getz in Chappaqua (SteepleChase, 1997)

With Susannah McCorkle

- The People That You Never Get to Love (Inner City, 1981)
- Thanks for The Memory-Songs of Leo Robin (Pausa, 1984)
- How Do You Keep The Music Playing? (Pausa, 1986)
- Dream (Pausa, 1987)

With Marian McPartland

- Personal Choice (Concord Jazz, 1983)
- Plays the Music of Billy Strayhorn (Concord Jazz, 1987)
- Live at the Carlyle (Prevue, 1999)

With Larry Schneider

- Mohawk (SteepleChase, 1994)
- Freedom Jazz Dance (SteepleChase, 1996)
- Jazz (SteepleChase, 2001)

With Jack Wilkins

- Call Him Reckless (Musicmasters, 1989)
- Trioart (Arabesque, 1998)
- Until It's Time (MAXJAZZ, 2009)

With others

- Claude Bolling, Jazz a La Francaise (CBS, 1984)
- Nick Brignola, Poinciana (Reservoir, 1998)
- Alexis Cole, Someday My Prince Will Come (Venus, 2009)
- Cynthia Crane & Mike Renzi, Smoky Bar Songs for the No Smoking Section (Lookoutjazz, 1994)
- Brad Goode, By Myself (SteepleChase, 2001)
- Jerry Hahn, Time Changes (Enja, 1995)
- Nancy Harrow, Street of Dreams (Poljazz, 1989)
- Fred Hersch, The French Collection (EMI/Angel, 1989)
- Fred Hersch, Red Square Blue (Angel, 1993)
- Vic Juris, Night Tripper (SteepleChase, 1995)
- Vic Juris, Music of Alec Wilder (Double-Time, 1996)
- Dick Katz, 3wayPlay (Reservoir, 1993)
- Pat Martino, The Return (Muse, 1987)
- Mark Murphy, Beauty and the Beast (Muse, 1987)
- Mark Murphy, Some Time Ago (HighNote, 2000)
- Mark Murphy, Links (HighNote, 2001)
- Portia Nelson, This Life Her Songs and Her Friends (1996)
- Mary Osborne, Now and Then (Stash, 1982)
- Mary Osborne, A Memorial (Stash, 1992)
- Doug Raney, Blues On a Par (SteepleChase, 1994)
- Spike Robinson & Al Cohn, Henry B. Meets Alvin G.: Once in a Wild (Capri, 1987)
- Bobby Scott, Slowly (MusicMasters, 1991)
- Carol Sloane, I Never Went Away (HighNote, 2001)
- Louis Smith, Strike Up the Band (SteepleChase, 1991)
- Jeremy Steig, Jigsaw (Triloka, 1992)
- Loren Stillman, Trio Alto Vol. 1 (SteepleChase, 2006)
- John Tchicai, In Monk's Mood (SteepleChase, 2009)
- Dave Tofani, Nights at the Inn (SoloWinds, 2007)
- Iris Williams, I'm Glad There Is You (Sea Ker, 1995)
- Eliot Zigmund, Starlight (Jazz Today)
