= Jim Hall's Three =

Studio album by Jim Hall
- Released: 1986
- Recorded: January 1986
- Studio: Penny Lane Studios New York City
- Genre: Jazz
- Length: 40:40
- Label: Concord Jazz; CJ-298
- Producer: Carl E. Jefferson

Jim Hall chronology
| Telephone (1985) | Jim Hall's Three (1986) | These Rooms (1988) |

Jim Hall's Three is an album by guitarist Jim Hall recorded in 1986 and released by the Concord Jazz label.

== Reception ==
Professional ratings
Review scores
| Source | Rating |
|---|---|
| AllMusic | 4/5 stars |

AllMusic awarded the album 4 stars, with the review by Ken Dryden stating, "Hall, as usual, solos in his unique economical style and leaves plenty of breathing room for the music ... This is another gem from one of the deans of modern jazz guitar".

== Track listing ==
All compositions by Jim Hall except where noted

1. "Hide and Seek" – 4:06
2. "Skylark" (Hoagy Carmichael, Johnny Mercer) – 7:11
3. "Bottlenose Blues" – 4:35
4. "And I Do" – 5:04
5. "All the Things You Are" (Jerome Kern, Oscar Hammerstein II) – 4:59
6. "Poor Butterfly" (Raymond Hubbell, John Golden) – 5:57
7. "Three" – 8:48

== Personnel ==
- Jim Hall – guitar
- Steve LaSpina – bass
- Akira Tana – drums
