= The Wonderful World of Jazz =

Studio album by John Lewis
- Released: 1961
- Recorded: July 29 and September 8–9, 1960; NYC
- Genre: Jazz
- Length: 55:09
- Label: Atlantic; SD 1375
- Producer: Nesuhi Ertegun, Tom Dowd

John Lewis chronology
The Golden Striker (1960)	The Wonderful World of Jazz (1961)	Jazz Abstractions (1961)

The Wonderful World of Jazz is an album by pianist and composer John Lewis recorded for the Atlantic label in 1960.

== Reception ==
Professional ratings
Review scores
Source	Rating
Allmusic	4.5/5 stars

Allmusic awarded the album 4½ stars stating it is "one of pianist John Lewis' most rewarding albums outside of his work with the Modern Jazz Quartet".

== Track listing ==
All compositions by John Lewis except as indicated

1. "Body and Soul" (Frank Eyton, Johnny Green, Edward Heyman, Robert Sour) - 15:24
2. "I Should Care" (Sammy Cahn, Axel Stordahl, Paul Weston) - 4:50
3. "Two Degrees East, Three Degrees West" - 5:35
4. "Afternoon in Paris" - 9:55
5. "I Remember Clifford" (Benny Golson) - 3:25
6. "The Stranger" (Arif Mardin) - 5:39 Bonus track on CD reissue
7. "If You Could See Me Now" (Tadd Dameron, Carl Sigman) - 10:21 Bonus track on CD reissue
- Recorded in New York City on July 29, 1960 (tracks 2, 3 & 5), September 8, 1960 (track 1), and September 9, 1960 (tracks 4, 6 & 7)

== Personnel ==
- John Lewis - piano, arranger
- Jim Hall - guitar
- George Duvivier - bass
- Connie Kay - drums
- Herb Pomeroy - trumpet (tracks 1, 4 & 6)
- Gunther Schuller - French horn (tracks 4 & 6)
- Eric Dolphy - alto saxophone (tracks 4 & 6)
- Benny Golson (tracks 4 & 6), Paul Gonsalves (track 1) - tenor saxophone
- James Rivers - baritone saxophone (tracks 4 & 6)
- Arif Mardin - arranger (track 6)
