= All Across the City =

Studio album by Jim Hall
- Released: 1989
- Recorded: May 1989
- Studio: Penny Lane Studios New York City
- Genre: Jazz
- Length: 56:52
- Label: Concord Jazz; CCD-4384
- Producer: Carl E. Jefferson

Jim Hall chronology
These Rooms (1988)	All Across the City (1989)	Charlie Haden/Jim Hall (1990)

All Across the City is an album by American jazz guitarist Jim Hall recorded in 1989 and released on the Concord Jazz label.

== Reception ==
Professional ratings
Review scores
Source	Rating
AllMusic	4.5/5 stars

AllMusic awarded the album 4 1/2 stars, with the review by Ken Dryden stating, "Jim Hall's successful blend of contemporary and mainstream jazz should appeal to both camps on this well-crafted CD. Hall displays the subtle quiet lyricism that makes his guitar sound instantly identifiable... One of Jim Hall's best CDs".

== Track listing ==
All compositions by Jim Hall except where noted

1. "Beija-Flor" (Nelson Cavaquinho, Noel Silva) – 6:32
2. "Bemsha Swing" (Thelonious Monk, Denzil Best) – 5:13
3. "Prelude to a Kiss" (Duke Ellington, Irving Gordon, Irving Mills) – 4:51
4. "Young One (For Debra)" – 4:27
5. "R.E.M. State" (Gil Goldstein) – 5:34
6. "Jane" – 4:59
7. "All Across the City" – 5:32
8. "Drop Shot" – 5:33
9. "How Deep Is the Ocean?" (Irving Berlin) – 3:29
10. "Something Tells Me" (Jane Hall) – 5:00
11. "Big Blues" – 6:25

== Personnel ==
- Jim Hall – guitar
- Gil Goldstein – keyboards
- Steve LaSpina – bass
- Terry Clarke – drums
