= Pyramid (Modern Jazz Quartet album) =

Studio album by the Modern Jazz Quartet
- Released: 1960
- Recorded: August 22 & 25, 1959; December 21, 1959; January 15, 1960
- Venue: Music Inn, Lenox, MA (August 1959)
- Studio: Capitol Studios, New York City
- Genre: Jazz
- Length: 37:24
- Label: Atlantic 1325
- Producer: Nesuhi Ertegun

Modern Jazz Quartet chronology
Third Stream Music (1960)	Pyramid (1960)	European Concert (1960)

Milt Jackson chronology
Third Stream Music (1960)	Pyramid (1960)	European Concert (1960)

Professional ratings
Review scores
Source	Rating
Allmusic	4.5/5 stars
DownBeat	5/5 stars
The Rolling Stone Jazz Record Guide	5/5 stars
The Penguin Guide to Jazz Recordings	3.5/4 stars

Pyramid is an album by American jazz group the Modern Jazz Quartet featuring performances recorded from 1959 to 1960 and released on the Atlantic label.

== Reception ==
The AllMusic review states, "The MJQ had become a jazz institution by this time, but they never lost their creative edge, and their performances (even on the remakes) are quite stimulating, enthusiastic, and fresh."

== Track listing ==
1. "Vendome" (John Lewis) – 2:30
2. "Pyramid (Blues for Junior)" (Ray Brown) – 10:46
3. "It Don't Mean a Thing (If It Ain't Got That Swing)" (Duke Ellington, Irving Mills) – 5:02
4. "Django" (John Lewis) – 4:36
5. "How High the Moon" (Nancy Hamilton, Morgan Lewis) – 6:15
6. "Romaine" (Jim Hall) – 7:28

== Personnel ==
- Milt Jackson – vibraphone
- John Lewis – piano
- Percy Heath – bass
- Connie Kay – drums
