= Alone Together (Ron Carter and Jim Hall album) =

Live album by Jim Hall, Ron Carter
- Released: 1973
- Recorded: August 4, 1972
- Venue: Playboy Club, New York
- Genre: Jazz
- Length: 43:54
- Label: Milestone
- Producer: Dick Katz

Jim Hall chronology
Where Would I Be? (1971)	Alone Together (1973)	Concierto (1975)

Ron Carter chronology
Uptown Conversation (1969)	Alone Together (1972)	Blues Farm (1973)

Professional ratings
Review scores
Source	Rating
Allmusic	4.5/5 stars
The Rolling Stone Jazz Record Guide	3/5 stars

Alone Together is a live album by Jim Hall and Ron Carter, released in 1973. The album was recorded at the Playboy Club in New York on August 4, 1972.

== Track listing ==
1. "St. Thomas" (Sonny Rollins) – 4:44
2. "Alone Together" (Arthur Schwartz, Howard Dietz) – 5:51
3. "Receipt, Please" (Ron Carter) – 4:59
4. "I'll Remember April" (Gene de Paul, Patricia Johnston, Don Raye) – 6:50
5. "Softly, As in a Morning Sunrise" (Sigmund Romberg, Oscar Hammerstein II) – 2:52
6. "Whose Blues?" (Jim Hall) – 5:54
7. "Prelude to a Kiss" (Duke Ellington, Irving Gordon, Irving Mills) – 5:50
8. "Autumn Leaves" (Joseph Kosma, Johnny Mercer, Jacques Prévert) – 6:54

== Personnel ==
- Jim Hall – guitar
- Ron Carter – bass

== Charts ==
Year	Chart	Position
1973	Billboard Jazz Albums	33
