= Odds Against Tomorrow =

1959 film by Robert Wise

- Theatrical release poster
- Directed by: Robert Wise
- Screenplay by: Abraham Polonsky; Nelson Gidding
- Based on: Odds Against Tomorrow; 1957 novel by William P. McGivern
- Produced by: Robert Wise
- Starring: Harry Belafonte; Robert Ryan; Shelley Winters; Ed Begley; Gloria Grahame; Will Kuluva; Kim Hamilton; Mae Barnes; Carmen De Lavallade; Richard Bright; Lew Gallo
- Cinematography: Joseph C. Brun
- Edited by: Dede Allen
- Music by: John Lewis
- Production company: HarBel Productions
- Distributed by: United Artists
- Release date: October 15, 1959 (United States)
- Running time: 95 minutes
- Country: United States
- Language: English

Odds Against Tomorrow is a 1959 American film noir produced and directed by Robert Wise and starring Harry Belafonte, Robert Ryan and Ed Begley. Belafonte selected Abraham Polonsky to write the script, which is based on a novel of the same name by William P. McGivern. Blacklisted in those years, Polonsky had to use a front and John O. Killens was credited. Polonsky's screenwriting credit was restored in 1996 in his own name.

== Plot ==
David Burke is a former policeman who was ruined when he refused to cooperate with state crime investigators. He asks Earle Slater, a tough ex-con and racist, to help him rob a bank, promising him $50,000 if the robbery is successful. Burke also recruits Johnny Ingram, a nightclub entertainer, who doesn't want the job but who is addicted to gambling and deeply in debt.

Slater, who is supported by his girlfriend Lorry, learns that Ingram is black and refuses the job. Later, he realizes that he needs the money, and joins Ingram and Burke in the enterprise. Tensions between Ingram and Slater increase as they near completion of the crime.

On the night of the robbery, the three crooks are able to enter the bank and abscond with stolen money. Burke is seen by a police officer when leaving the scene of the raid and is gunned down in the ensuing shootout. He then shoots himself to avoid capture. Slater and Ingram fight each other while evading the police. They escape and run to a fuel storage depot, chasing each other onto the top of the fuel tanks. When they exchange gunfire, the fuel tanks ignite, causing a large explosion. Later, when police survey the scene, Slater's and Ingram's burned corpses are indistinguishable from each other. The film ends with a shot of a sign at the entrance of the depot reading "STOP—DEAD END".

== Cast ==
- Harry Belafonte as Johnny Ingram
- Robert Ryan as Earl Slater
- Shelley Winters as Lorry
- Ed Begley as David Burke
- Gloria Grahame as Helen
- Will Kuluva as Bacco
- Kim Hamilton as Ruth
- Mae Barnes as Annie
- Richard Bright as Coco
- Carmen De Lavallade as Kitty
- Lew Gallo as Moriarty
- Lois Thorne as Eadie
- Wayne Rogers Soldier in bar
- Zohra Lampert as Girl in Bar
- Allen Nourse as Police Chief

== Production ==
The film was produced by HarBel Productions, a company founded by the film's star, Harry Belafonte. He selected Abraham Polonsky as the screenwriter. Polonsky was blacklisted by the House Unamerican Activities Committee at the time, which had conducted extensive hearings on communist influence in the film industry. He used John O. Killens, a black novelist and friend of Belafonte, as a front to be the credited screenwriter. In 1996, the Writers Guild of America restored Polonsky's film credit under his own name.

Principal photography began in March 1959. All outdoor scenes were shot in New York City and Hudson, New York. According to director Robert Wise:

I did something in Odds Against Tomorrow I'd been wanting to do in some pictures but hadn't had the chance. I wanted a certain kind of mood in some sequences, such as the opening when Robert Ryan is walking down West Side Street...I used infra-red film. You have to be very careful with that because it turns green things white, and you can't get too close on people's faces. It does distort them but gives that wonderful quality—black skies with white clouds—and it changes the feeling and look of the scenes.

This film was the last in which Wise shot black-and-white film in the standard aspect ratio. This technique "gave his films the gritty realism they were known for." After this film, Wise shot two black-and-white films, both in the cinemascope (2.35:1) aspect ratio: Two for the Seesaw and The Haunting.

== Musical score and soundtrack ==
Odds Against Tomorrow

Soundtrack album by John Lewis
- Released: 1959
- Recorded: July 16–17 & 20, 1959 in NYC
- Genre: film score
- Length: 43:11
- Labels: United Artists; UAL 4061

John Lewis chronology
Improvised Meditations and Excursions (1959)	Odds Against Tomorrow (1959)	The Golden Striker (1960)

Professional ratings
Review scores
Source	Rating
Allmusic	4.5/5 stars

The film score was composed, arranged, and conducted by John Lewis of the Modern Jazz Quartet. The soundtrack album was released on the United Artists label in 1959. To realize his score, Lewis assembled a 22-piece orchestra, which included MJQ bandmates Milt Jackson on vibraphone, Percy Heath on bass, and Connie Kay on drums along with Bill Evans on piano and Jim Hall on guitar. AllMusic's Bruce Eder noted, "This superb jazz score by John Lewis was later turned into a hit by The Modern Jazz Quartet. It's dark and dynamic, and a classic." The Modern Jazz Quartet's album of Lewis' themes, Music from Odds Against Tomorrow, was recorded in October 1959. The track "Skating in Central Park" became a permanent part of the MJQ's repertoire and was recorded by Evans and Hall on the album Undercurrent. It was reused for a similar scene in the 1971 film Little Murders.

=== Track listing ===
All compositions by John Lewis

1. "Prelude to Odds Against Tomorrow" – 1:44
2. "A Cold Wind Is Blowing" – 1:20
3. "Five Figure People Crossing Paths" – 1:40
4. "How to Frame Pigeons" – 1:04
5. "Morning Trip to Melton" – 3:09
6. "Looking at the Caper" – 2:01
7. "Johnny Ingram's Possessions" – 1:08
8. "The Carousel Incident" – 1:44
9. "Skating in Central Park" – 3:29
10. "No Happiness for Slater" – 3:56
11. "Main Theme: Odds Against Tomorrow" – 3:24
12. "Games" – 2:17
13. "Social Call" – 3:53
14. "The Impractical Man – 3:00
15. Advance on Melton" – 1:58
16. "Waiting Around the River" – 3:51
17. "Distractions" – 1:25
18. "The Caper Failure" – 1:23
19. "Postlude" – 0:45

=== Personnel ===
- John Lewis – arranger, conductor
- Bernie Glow, Joe Wilder, John Ware, Melvyn Broiles – trumpet
- John Clark, Tom McIntosh – trombone
- Al Richman, Gunther Schuller, Paul Ingram, Ray Alonge – French horn
- Harvey Phillips – tuba
- Robert DiDomenica – flute
- Harvey Shapiro, Joseph Tekula – cello
- Ruth Berman – harp
- Milt Jackson – vibraphone
- Bill Evans – piano
- Jim Hall – guitar
- Percy Heath – bass
- Connie Kay – drums
- Richard Horowitz – timpani
- Walter Rosenberger – percussion

== Reception ==
=== Critical response ===
The film has an 88% rating on Rotten Tomatoes. Bosley Crowther of the New York Times described Wise's direction as "tight and strong" and the film as a "sharp, hard, suspenseful melodrama," with a "sheer dramatic build-up...of an artistic caliber that is rarely achieved on the screen."

Time magazine wrote:

The tension builds well to the climax—thanks partly to Director Robert Wise (I Want to Live!), partly to an able Negro scriptwriter named John O. Killens, but mostly to Actor Ryan, a menace who can look bullets and smile sulphuric acid. But the tension is released too soon—and much too trickily. The spectator is left with a feeling that is aptly expressed in the final frame of the film, when the camera focuses on a street sign that reads: STOP—DEAD END.

Variety wrote: "On one level, Odds against Tomorrow is a taut crime melodrama. On another, it is an allegory about racism, greed and man's propensity for self-destruction. Not altogether successful in the second category, it still succeeds on its first."

Forty years after the film's release, critic Stephen Holden called it "sadly overlooked." Eddie Muller listed it as one of his Top 25 Noir Films.

=== Awards ===
The film was nominated for a Golden Globe award for Motion Picture Promoting International Understanding.

== Books ==
A book of the screenplay titled Odds Against Tomorrow: A Critical Edition (ISBN 0963582348) was published in 1999 by the Center for Telecommunication Studies, sponsored by the Radio-Television-Film department at California State University, Northridge. The book includes the film's complete script, blending the shooting and continuity scripts, and a critical analysis written by CSUN professor John Schultheiss, who conducted interviews with Wise, Belafonte and Polonsky.

== Home media ==
Odds Against Tomorrow was released on DVD by MGM Home Video on December 2, 2003, as a Region 1 full-frame DVD. The film was released on Blu-ray disc by Olive Films on May 29, 2018.

== See also ==
- The Modern Jazz Quartet, Music from Odds Against Tomorrow (1959)
- Bill Evans and Jim Hall, Undercurrent (1962)
- List of American films of 1959
