= Terry Clarke (drummer) =

Canadian jazz drummer (born 1944)

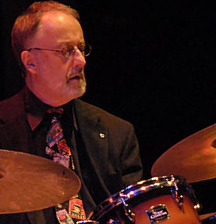

Background information
- Born: Terence Michael Clarke; August 20, 1944 (age 81); Vancouver, B.C., Canada
- Genres: Jazz
- Instrument: Drums

Terence Michael "Terry" Clarke C.M. (born August 20, 1944, Vancouver) is a Canadian jazz drummer.

Clarke studied percussion with Jim Blackley and played with Chris Gage and Dave Robbins early in his career. From 1965 to 1967 he toured in a quintet with John Handy, and joined The Fifth Dimension in 1967, remaining with the ensemble until 1969.

In 1970, he moved to Toronto, where he began a longstanding association with Rob McConnell's group, Boss Brass; he also played with Ed Bickert, Ruby Braff, Jim Galloway, Sonny Greenwich, Jay McShann, Emily Remler, and Frank Rosolino. In 1976, he toured with Jim Hall for the first time and in 1981 did an international tour with Oscar Peterson.

He relocated to New York City in 1985, where he played or recorded with Toshiko Akiyoshi, Eddie Daniels, Oliver Jones, Roger Kellaway, Helen Merrill, Ken Peplowski, and Joe Roccisano, among others. He played with the Free Trade ensemble in 1994, a quintet composed of Clarke, Ralph Bowen, Neil Swainson, Renee Rosnes, and Peter Leitch.

Clarke returned to Toronto in 1999, where he joined The Rob McConnell Tentet. Clarke's 2009 debut album It's About Time won a Juno Award for Traditional Jazz Album of the Year.

Clarke was appointed a Member of the Order of Canada in 2002.

Clarke was also featured in the 2009 album by Norm Amadio titled Norm Amadio and Friends, providing the accompaniment for the songs on the album.

== Discography ==
=== As a leader ===
- It's About Time (Blue Music Group, 2009)

=== As a sideman ===
With Ed Bickert

- Ed Bickert (PM, 1976)
- I Like To Recognize The Tune (United Artists, 1977)
- Jazz Canada Europe '79 (Radio Canada International, 1979)
- I Wished On The Moon (Concord Jazz, 1985)
- The Guitar Mastery Of Ed Bickert (Unidisc, 1996)
- Out Of The Past (Sackville Recordings, 2006)

with Ed Bickert Trio & Dave McKenna

- Third Floor Richard (Concord Jazz, 1989)

with Dave Stahl Band

- Standard Issue (Abee Cake Records, 1991)

with Ed Bickert & Don Thompson

- At The Garden Party (Sackville Recordings, 2004)

with Jim Hall

- Jim Hall Live! (A&M, 1975)
- Jim Hall Live in Tokyo (A&M, 1976)
- Commitment (Horizon, 1976)
- Jazz Impressions of Japan (Horizon, 1977)
- Circles (Concord Jazz, 1981)
- All Across the City (Concord Jazz, 1989)
- Jim Hall Live In Tokyo - Complete Version (King Record Co., 1991)
- Live At Town Hall Volumes 1 & 2 (Jazz Heritage, 1991)
- Subsequently (MusicMasters, 1992)
- Carnegie Hall Concert (Columbia, 1992)
- Textures (Telarc, 1997)
- Panorama - Live At The Village Vanguard (Telarc, 1997)
- By Arrangement (Telarc, 1998)
- Jazzpar Quartet + 4 (Storyville, 1998)

with Eddie Higgins

- Speaking of Jobim (Sunnyside, 1998)

with Oliver Jones

- Cookin' at Sweet Basil (Justin Time, 1988)

with Dave Liebman/Mike Murley Quartet

- Live at U of T (U of T Jazz, 2017)

with Oscar Peterson

- Nigerian Marketplace (Pablo Live, 1982)

with Emily Remler

- Take Two (Concord, 1982)

With the Joe Roccisano Orchestra

- Leave Your Mind Behind (Landmark, 1995)

with Buddy Tate Featuring The Ed Bickert Trio

- The Ballad Artistry Of Buddy Tate (Sackville Recordings, 1982)
