= Panorama: Live at the Village Vanguard =

Live album by Jim Hall
- Released: October 28, 1997
- Recorded: December 4–8, 1996; Village Vanguard, New York City
- Genre: Jazz
- Length: 1:03:40
- Label: Telarc
- Producer: John Snyder

Jim Hall chronology
Textures (1997)	Panorama: Live at the Village Vanguard (1997)	By Arrangement (1998)

Panorama: Live at the Village Vanguard is a 1997 album by American jazz guitarist Jim Hall. It was his twenty-seventh album as bandleader.

== Reception ==
Professional ratings
Review scores
Source	Rating
AllMusic	4/5 stars
The Penguin Guide to Jazz Recordings	3.5/4 stars

Jim Ferguson, writing for JazzTimes, wrote that the album had a "number of guest musicians, several of whom he [Jim Hall] had really never played with before." He called it "a concept project within the context of a live recording", and said that "the idea behind Panorama is as clever as Hall's playing is brilliant."

Richard S. Ginell of AllMusic wrote that: "Jim Hall's previous two Telarcs...were so adventurous and out-of-perceived-character that this...might seem like a step backwards at a superficial glance." He compared it to "a revolving door full of guest soloists...each one of whom offers a different slant on what jazz ought to be." He finished his review with the remark of "one can only imagine the fascination of the habitually superattentive patrons of the Vanguard at all of this diversity."

== Track listing ==
All songs composed by Jim Hall except where noted.

1. "Pan-O-Rama" – 8:21
2. "Little Blues" – 9:03
3. "The Answer is Yes" (Jane Hall) – 9:09
4. "Entre Nous" – 4:23
5. "Furnished Flats" – 6:50
6. "Something to Wish For" – 4:45
7. "No You Don't" – 6:40
8. "Painted Pig" – 7:34
9. "Here Comes Jane" – 6:55

== Personnel ==
- Jim Hall – electric guitar
- Kenny Barron – piano (tracks 3 and 6)
- Art Farmer – flugelhorn (track 2)
- Slide Hampton – trombone (tracks 4 and 7)
- Geoff Keezer – piano (tracks 1 and 9)
- Greg Osby – alto saxophone (tracks 5 and 8)
- Scott Colley – double bass
- Terry Clarke – drums
