= These Rooms =

Studio album by Jim Hall
- Released: 1988
- Recorded: February 9 & 10, 1988
- Studio: Sorcerer Sound, New York City
- Genre: Jazz
- Length: 66:45
- Label: Denon; CY-30002
- Producer: Al Evers, Herb Wong

Jim Hall chronology
Jim Hall's Three (1986)	These Rooms (1988)	All Across the City (1989)

These Rooms is an album by guitarist Jim Hall recorded in 1988 and released on the Japanese Denon label.

== Reception ==
Professional ratings
Review scores
Source	Rating
AllMusic	4.5/5 stars

AllMusic awarded the album 4 1/2 stars, with the review by Ken Dryden stating, "This 1988 studio date is one of the overlooked treasures in the considerable discography of Jim Hall ... a delight from start to finish".

== Track listing ==
All compositions by Jim Hall except where noted

1. "With a Song in My Heart" (Richard Rodgers, Lorenz Hart) – 8:22
2. "Cross Court" – 5:11
3. "Something Tells Me" – 5:10
4. "Bimini" – 9:19
5. "All Too Soon" (Duke Ellington, Carl Sigman) – 4:00
6. "These Rooms" – 11:25
7. "Darn That Dream" (Jimmy Van Heusen, Eddie DeLange) – 4:03
8. "My Funny Valentine" (Rodgers, Hart) – 6:22
9. "Where or When" (Rodgers, Hart) – 5:49
10. "From Now On" (Tom Harrell) – 7:04

== Personnel ==
- Jim Hall – guitar
- Tom Harrell – trumpet, flugelhorn
- Steve LaSpina – bass
- Joey Baron – drums
