= Where Would I Be? =

...Where Would I Be?

Studio album by Jim Hall
- Released: 1972
- Recorded: July 1971
- Studio: Mediasound, New York City
- Genre: Jazz
- Length: 39:19
- Label: Milestone; MSP 9037
- Producer: Dick Katz

Jim Hall chronology
It's Nice to Be With You (1969)	...Where Would I Be? (1972)	Alone Together (1972)

...Where Would I Be? is an album by guitarist Jim Hall which was recorded in 1971 and first released on the Milestone label.

== Reception ==
Professional ratings
Review scores
Source	Rating
AllMusic	3/5 stars
DownBeat	4.5/5 stars
The Penguin Guide to Jazz Recordings	3/4 stars

AllMusic awarded the album 3 stars and its review by Scott Yanow states "Although the rhythm section was more "modern" than he usually used (keyboardist Benny Aronov, bassist Malcolm Cecil, and Airto Moreira on drums and percussion), guitarist Jim Hall (who always had a harmonically advanced style anyway) has little difficulty adapting to the fresh setting".

== Track listing ==
All compositions by Jim Hall except where noted.

1. "Simple Samba" - 4:18
2. "Where Would I Be?" (Jane Herbert) - 5:11
3. "Careful" - 4:54
4. "Baubles, Bangles, & Beads" (Robert Wright, George Forrest) - 3:26
5. "Minotaur" - 8:08
6. "I Should Care" (Axel Stordahl, Paul Weston, Sammy Cahn) - 3:50
7. "Vera Cruz" (Milton Nascimento) - 3:55
8. "Goodbye, My Love" (Herbert) - 5:37

== Personnel ==
- Jim Hall - guitar
- Benny Aronov - piano, electric piano (tracks 1–5, 7 & 8)
- Malcolm Cecil - bass (tracks 1–5, 7 & 8)
- Airto Moreira - drums, percussion (tracks 1–5, 7 & 8)
