= Satoshi Inoue (musician) =

Japanese jazz guitarist (born 1956)

Satoshi Inoue (井上智, Inoue Satoshi; born November 12, 1956) is a Japanese jazz guitarist. Jim Hall calls his former protégé, "an excellent jazz guitarist with a keen musical imagination."

Born in Kobe, Inoue studied at Kyoto's Fuji School of Music from 1979-81. Between 1981-1988, he led his own groups in Japan. He moved to New York City in 1989 to study at The New School for Jazz and Contemporary Music where he met Hall. He has been on the faculty of the university since his senior year. The two performed together on a guitar duet that was featured on Hall's widely used instructional video collection called Jazz Guitar Master Class Volumes 1&2. In 2005, Hall and Inoue appeared in Village Vanguard 70th anniversary together.

Over the years, Inoue has toured with jazz greats such as James Moody; James Williams; Cecil Bridgewater; Frank Foster; Slide Hampton; Barry Harris; Jimmy Heath; Arnie Lawrence; Jack McDuff; Junior Mance; Jon Faddis; Akira Tana; The Clayton Brothers and Toshiko Akiyoshi.

His own band has gigged at New York's top jazz venues - past and present - including The Blue Note, Sweet Basil, Birdland, Smoke, the Village Gate and Zinc Bar.

For twelve years, Inoue has brought American musicians to Japan to conduct fall tours for concerts and workshops, including the "Big Apple in Nonoichi" festival.

Jazz critics and musicians have known about Satoshi Inoue for quite some time. A jazz historian Ira Gitler describes hearing Satoshi live in the early 1990s at Sazerac House, a restaurant on New York's Hudson Street: "I was taken with the unforced flow of his ideas and the mellow sound with which he transmitted them".

His lectures on jazz standards appear monthly in a Japanese jazz magazine called Jazz Life.

== Discography ==
- 1996: Plays Satoshi (Paddle Wheel Records)
- 1999: Songs (Paddle Wheel)
- 2002: Live At Smoke (What's New Records)
- 2003: Guitars Alone (What's New) duet with Peter Bernstein
- 2006: Melodic Compositions (What's New)
- 2014: Plays Jim Hall (What's New)
