= Concierto =

Studio album by Jim Hall
- Released: 1975
- Recorded: April 16 & 23, 1975
- Studio: Van Gelder Studio, Englewood Cliffs, NJ
- Genre: Cool jazz, post-bop
- Length: 38:02 original LP; 68:07 CD reissue
- Label: CTI; CTI 6060 S1
- Producer: Creed Taylor

Jim Hall chronology
Alone Together (1973)	Concierto (1975)	Jim Hall Live! (1975)

Professional ratings
Review scores
Source	Rating
Allmusic	4.5/5 stars
The Rolling Stone Jazz Record Guide	4/5 stars

Concierto is an album by the Jim Hall sextet, featuring Paul Desmond, Chet Baker, Ron Carter, Steve Gadd and Roland Hanna. It was produced by Creed Taylor for his CTI Records label and recorded at Van Gelder Studio in New Jersey on April 16 and 23, 1975. Concierto is named after the featured 19-minute jazz version of the classical piece for guitar, Concierto de Aranjuez by Joaquín Rodrigo.

== Track listing ==
1. "You'd Be So Nice to Come Home To" (Cole Porter) – 7:08
2. "Two's Blues" (Jim Hall) – 3:51
3. "The Answer Is Yes" (Jane Hall) – 7:41
4. "Concierto de Aranjuez" (Joaquín Rodrigo) – 19:22

Bonus tracks on CD reissue:

5. "Rock Skippin'" (Ellington, Strayhorn) – 6:14
6. "Unfinished Business" (Andrews, Carter, Chavez, Hall, Von Roth) – 2:37
7. "You'd Be So Nice to Come Home To" [Alternate Take] - 7:28
8. "The Answer Is Yes" [Alternate Take] - 5:36
9. "Rock Skippin'" [Alternate Take] - 6:05

Tracks 3, 4 recorded on April 16, 1975; tracks 1, 2, 6, 8 on April 23, 1975.

== Personnel ==
- Jim Hall – guitar, acoustic guitar
- Paul Desmond – alto saxophone
- Chet Baker – trumpet
- Roland Hanna – piano
- Ron Carter – upright bass
- Steve Gadd – drums
- Arranged by Don Sebesky
