= It's Nice to Be With You (Jim Hall album) =

Studio album by Jim Hall
- Released: 1969
- Recorded: June 27 & 28, 1969
- Studio: Teldec Studio Berlin, West Germany
- Genre: Jazz
- Length: 37:17
- Label: MPS; MSP 9037
- Producer: Joachim-Ernst Berendt

Jim Hall chronology
Intermodulation (1966)	It's Nice to Be With You (1969)	Where Would I Be? (1971)

It's Nice to Be With You (subtitled Jim Hall in Berlin) is an album by guitarist Jim Hall which was recorded in 1969 during a European tour and released on the MPS label.

== Reception ==
Professional ratings
Review scores
Source	Rating
AllMusic	3/5 stars

AllMusic awarded the album 3 stars and its review by Ken Dryden states "this collectible release is well worth acquiring".

== Track listing ==
All compositions by Jim Hall except where noted.

1. "Up, Up and Away" (Jimmy Webb) - 4:57
2. "My Funny Valentine" (Richard Rodgers, Lorenz Hart) - 3:28
3. "Young One for Debra" - 4:26
4. "Blue Joe" - 4:45
5. "It's Nice to Be with You" (Jane Herbert) - 4:43
6. "In a Sentimental Mood" (Duke Ellington) - 5:50
7. "Body and Soul" (Johnny Green, Edward Heyman, Robert Sour, Frank Eyton) - 6:21
8. "Romaine" - 2:58

== Personnel ==
- Jim Hall - guitar
- Jimmy Woode - bass
- Daniel Humair - drums
