= First Edition (George Shearing and Jim Hall album) =

Studio album by George Shearing and Jim Hall
- Released: 1981
- Recorded: September 1981
- Genre: Jazz
- Length: 38:10
- Label: Concord CJ 177
- Producer: Carl Jefferson

George Shearing chronology
Alone Together (1981)	First Edition (1981)	An Evening with George Shearing & Mel Tormé (1982)

Jim Hall chronology
Concierto De Aranjuez (1981)	First Edition (1981)	Circles (1981)

First Edition is a 1981 album by the jazz pianist George Shearing and the guitarist Jim Hall.

== Reception ==
Professional ratings
Review scores
Source	Rating
Allmusic	4/5 stars

Scott Yanow reviewed the album for Allmusic describing it as a "tasteful set" and that the music "challenge[d] the pair and their quiet and subtle styles match together well", concluding that it was an "interesting and somewhat unexpected musical collaboration".

== Track listing ==
1. "Street of Dreams" (Sam M. Lewis, Victor Young) – 4:06
2. "To Antonio Carlos Jobim" (George Shearing) –3:15
3. "Careful" (Jim Hall) – 5:54
4. "I See Nothing to Laugh About" (Marvin Fisher) – 5:09
5. "Without Words" (Hall) – 5:03
6. "I Hear a Rhapsody" (Jack Baker, George Fragos, Dick Gasparre) – 3:41
7. "To Tommy Flanagan" (Shearing) – 5:10
8. "Emily" (Johnny Mandel, Johnny Mercer)–5:52

== Personnel ==
- George Shearing – piano
- Jim Hall – guitar

Production

- Phil Edwards – engineer, mixing
- Ira Gitler – liner notes
- George Horn – mastering
- Carl Jefferson – producer
- Dick Hendler – art direction
- Bruce Burr – cover photo, photography
