= Norman Amadio =

Canadian jazz musician (1928–2020)

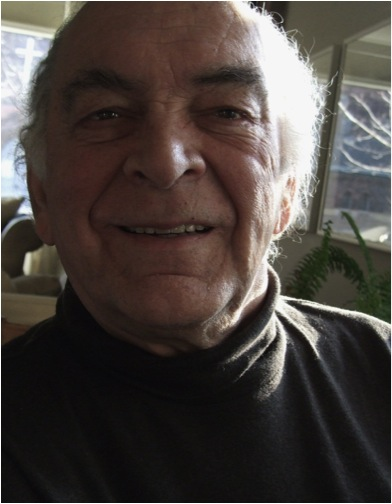

Background information
- Born: Albert Norman Benedict Amadio; April 14, 1928; Timmins, Ontario, Canada
- Died: January 21, 2020 (aged 91)
- Genres: Jazz
- Occupations: Pianist, arranger, composer, bandleader
- Instrument: Piano

Albert Norman Benedict "Norm" Amadio (April 14, 1928 – January 21, 2020) was a Canadian jazz pianist, piano teacher, music coach, composer, arranger, session player, band leader and accompanist. For a span of fifty years he worked for the CBC as an orchestra leader and musical director for many TV series. In 1956, he became the first and only Canadian to play at the original Birdland in New York City and while playing opposite Duke Ellington.

== Biography ==
Amadio was born in Timmins, Ontario. In 1943, he performed at a Victory Bond concert with Gracie Fields, and was asked to travel on a Canadian tour; his parents denied him permission because of his age. At the age of 15, Norm really loved Art Tatum's playing. Soon after he found inspiration from Be-boppers such as Charlie Parker, Bud Powell and Horace Silver. Norman eventually left Timmins for Toronto when he was 17 to study music with Boris Berlin at the Royal Conservatory for six months. He played jazz after hours, influenced by the be-bop pianists. Amadio was influential in starting the be-bop jazz music scene in Toronto, attracting many jazz notables from Canada and the US to sit in and work with him.

Amadio was a prominent figure in the late 1940s and early 1950s at the House of Hambourg in Toronto and subsequently became one of the city's leading accompanists and one of the most sought-after players in Toronto. In the 1950s and 1960s he worked at the main jazz venues in Toronto; The Towne Tavern, The Colonial, Bourbon Street, George's Spaghetti House from 1959 to 1963 and the First Floor Club with Don "D.T." Thompson's Be-Bop quintet. After working in the early 1950s in the lounge groups of Jim Younger, Chicho Valle, and Jimmy Amaro, he led the house band at the Old Towne Tavern for a nine-year stint during the 1950s and early 1960s. Word traveled to the U.S. about Amadio's playing and many American jazz superstars began to flock to Toronto. Among the American jazz greats who came to work with Norm Amadio's Trio in Toronto were Roy Eldridge, Stan Getz, Bill Harris, Coleman Hawkins, Zoot Sims, Ben Webster, Lester Young, Chet Baker, Anita O'Day, Bud Johnson, Lee Konitz, Sonny Stitt, Clark Terry, Howard McGee, Jimmy Witherspoon, Max Roach, Miles Davis, Carmen McRae, Joe Williams, Carol Sloane, Mel Torme, Dinah Washington, Red Mitchell, Phil Phillips, Maxine Sullivan, and Irene Kral.

"Norman Amadio, for instance (one of Canada's top jazz pianists), has been the quintessential musician, ever since he began to play in Toronto nightclubs in 1949. He played everywhere in small groups for a variety of leaders, on the CBC radio and in television, in recording studios, in theatres and concert halls, and as the leader of his own groups at jazz festivals." Murray Ginsberg

Journalist Peter Goddard: "Amadio was an aggressive bebop player along the lines of Bud Powell when he first arrived on the Toronto scene in the 1940s. A precocious teen musical whiz from Timmins, he soon enough learned to keep his cool when others were losing theirs in the city’s turbulent club scene.

Reliability got him work. Unrivaled musicality gave him stature and clout. Jazz stars arriving in town — Carmen McRae, Miles Davis, Joe Williams or Jimmy Rushing — wanted him. Or even needed him, as the veteran American singer Maxine Sullivan once told me." ."

Norman's musical career went on to include a great deal of studio work and close to a hundred recordings for various Canadian artists such as Moe Koffman, Ray Back with the Ed Sullivan Orchestra, The Tommy Ambrose Orchestra, Don (D.T.) Thompson and most recently with Guido Basso, Marc Jordan, and many more.

Amadio's many recordings went largely undocumented. Some of the recordings throughout his career include: Moe Koffman's "Tales Of Koffman" 1962, Phyllis Marshall's "That Girl" (Capitol) and he is on CDs with Rosemary Galloway's "Sisters of Swing".

Amadio worked on CBC Television for five seasons and became a well-known figure from coast-to-coast as musical director for the weekly Music Hop show from 1963 until 1967. Amadio later conducted for numerous other variety specials on the CBC network. He played in the house band on CBC-TV's Wayne & Shuster Show for 20 years, and with the Bert Niosi Orchestra on Cross Canada Hit Parade between 1953 and 1957. For a span of fifty years he worked for the CBC as an orchestra leader and musical director for many TV series, including The Tommy Ambrose Show 1956/57, Take 30 in 1961, Swing Gently, and Down Home Country, the syndicated series "Nashville Swing" 1977-82 and TV specials with Jane Eastwood, Kenny Rogers, Robert Goulet, Mel Tormé, Al Hirt, Buddy Rich, Maynard Ferguson, Henry Mancini, Nelson Riddle to name only a few. Amadio also performed a two-hour special live-broadcast in the CBC Special 100 Years of Canada with the 40-piece Norman Amadio Orchestra.

In the 1980s, Norm worked with Chet Baker when he came to Toronto along with other jazz greats like Ruby Bruff and Harry "Sweets" Edison.

Later with his orchestra, he backed Broadway and Las Vegas Stars at the Royal York Hotel's Imperial Room between 1987 and 1990 including Bobby Darin, The Drifters, The Coasters, The Inkspots, Phyllis Diller and Eddie Fisher. At the O'Keefe Centre Amadio worked with names including Judy Garland, Paul Anka, Engelbert Humperdinck, Red Skelton, The Supremes and Bob Hope. He also worked with the likes of Milton Berle, Jackie Mason, Phil Foster, the Smothers Brothers and Steve Lawrence at other venues.

The Canadian musicians and vocalists Amadio worked with are too numerous to list, but included Rob McConnell, Ed Bickert, Hagood Hardy, Jerry Fuller, Don Vickery, Bob Schilling, Bob Price, Alex Lazaroff, Archie Allyene, Jack Lander, Moe Koffman, Rosemary Galloway, Neil Swainson, George Koller, Peter Appleyard, Lorne Lofsky, Alex Dean, Phil Nimmons, P.J. Perry, Sam Noto, Reg Schwager, Steve Wallace, Bill Mulhall and Phil Dwyer. From Dec 2010 to Dec 2014, Amadio was the piano player and center focus of the Singer's Jazz Series organized and hosted by Toronto vocalist and artist Julie McGregor. The Singer's Jazz Series started out at the now defunct Trane Studio owned by jazz supporter Frank Francis. Singer's Jazz Series performed to sold-out shows alongside either bassist Duncan Hopkins or Neil Swainson playing popular hot spots and filling houses like Trane Studio, Hugh's Room and Pauper's Pub featuring up and coming local jazz singers and jazz poets; the late, Reiner W. Schwarz and Chris Hercules. "Today’s young crop of jazz singers, in Toronto and internationally, stands up well compared to 'all those singers who came before.' says Amadio." Amadio, at age 86 retired playing his last gig as part of The 2014 TD Downtown Jazz Festival Club Series accompanying vocalist Julie McGregor with Darryl Orr on sax. Norm recorded 12 songs with Julie McGregor and bassist George Koller in 2010, including: Dance Me To The End Of Love, Easy To Love, and I'm Glad There Is You.

Norman Amadio's second last CD, Norm Amadio and Friends included vocalists Marc Jordan and Jackie Richardson, saxophonist Phil Dwyer, Guido Basso on flugelhorn and with Reg Schwager (acoustic guitar, electric guitar). penned by producer Andrew A. Melzer.

Amadio died in January 2020, aged 91.

== See also ==
- List of jazz arrangers
