= The Gary McFarland Orchestra =

Studio album by Gary McFarland with guest soloist Bill Evans
- Released: 1963
- Recorded: January 24, 1963
- Genre: Jazz
- Label: Verve
- Producer: Creed Taylor

Gary McFarland chronology
The Jazz Version of "How to Succeed in Business without Really Trying" (1962)	The Gary McFarland Orchestra (1963)	Point of Departure (1963)

Bill Evans chronology
The Solo Sessions, Vol. 2 (1963)	The Gary McFarland Orchestra (1963)	Conversations with Myself (1963)

The Gary McFarland Orchestra is an album by composer, conductor, and vibraphonist Gary McFarland with an orchestra featuring guest soloist jazz pianist Bill Evans recorded in early 1963 for Verve.

Evans biographer Peter Pettinger notes that "McFarland had met Evans when a student at Lenox [Music Inn] in 1959. While planning an album of his own compositions, he ran into the pianist again and plucked up the courage to invite him onto it." McFarland said, "I built the album around Bill—around everything he is, his melodic gift, his harmonic conceptions, his ... well, his magic. That's what it really is. Magic. ... For my taste, he's the perfect pianist. He does everything perfectly."

The album consists of six original compositions by McFarland scored for an 11-piece ensemble that includes two violas and two cellos along with highly notable jazz performers such as guitarist Jim Hall, bassist Richard Davis, and Phil Woods on clarinet. Evans remained "a faithful admirer" of McFarland after this project and later added his composition "Gary's Theme" to his repertoire, recording it on the album You Must Believe in Spring.

== Reception ==
Professional ratings
Review scores
Source	Rating
DownBeat (Original Lp release)	4.5/5 stars
AllMusic	3/5 stars

The original DownBeat review awarded the album 4.5 stars, saying, "Evans emerges in beautiful fashion from these settings, appearing as a very logical part of the whole rather than having to drag each piece along with him as he might have if McFarland had not written as astutely as he has. ... These pieces—full of melody, mellowness, and gently lifting rhythm—are given unusually sensitive performances by McFarland's 11-man group."

The AllMusic review by Douglas Payne states, "The album is like a soundtrack celebrating the excitement of a big urban wonderland. The compositions are first-rate, McFarland's occasional vibes playing is simple and perfect. Bill Evans buoys the event with his graceful, individual style."

Pettinger comments, "The pianist had always tended to work well with vibraphonists, as his records with Eddie Costa, Dave Pike, and now McFarland showed. Here his touch was delicate, sparkling, and mostly decorative in character." Keith Shadwick adds, "The music ranges from quasi-classical ... to open-ended constructions of the sort often employed by Duke Ellington, where intriguing ensemble passages are contrasted against and defined by the consequent solos. ... [O]nly rarely would [Evans] return to such a stimulating and unusual musical environment."

== Reissues ==
The album has been released on compact disc at least four times: as part of the 18-CD set The Complete Bill Evans on Verve in 1997, by FiveFour in the U.K. in 2005, by Verve in a limited edition in Japan in 2008, and by Phono in the EU in 2016 with McFarland's earlier album The Jazz Version of "How to Succeed in Business without Really Trying" included as bonus material.

== Track listing ==
All compositions by Gary McFarland

1. "Reflections in the Park" - 3:44
2. "Night Images" - 5:54
3. "Tree Patterns" - 4:58
4. "Peach Tree" - 5:05
5. "Misplaced Cowpoke" - 10:15
6. "A Moment Alone" - 6:10

- Recorded at Webster Hall in New York City on January 24, 1963

== Personnel ==
- Gary McFarland - vibraphone, composer, conductor
- Bill Evans - piano
- Phil Woods - clarinet
- Spencer Sinatra - alto saxophone, flute
- Julien Barber, Allan Goldberg - viola
- Aaron Juvelier, Joseph Tekula - cello
- Jim Hall - guitar
- Richard Davis - bass
- Ed Shaughnessy - drums

Technical

- Val Valentin - director of engineering
- Ray Hall - recording engineer
- Charles Stewart - cover photography
