= Two Jims and Zoot =

Studio album by Jimmy Raney, Zoot Sims & Jim Hall
- Released: 1964
- Recorded: March 11 & 12, 1964 in NYC
- Genre: Jazz
- Length: 40:12
- Label: Mainstream; 56013/S6013
- Producer: Harry Ringler

Jimmy Raney chronology
The Street Swingers (1957)	Two Jims and Zoot (1964)	Momentum (1974)

Zoot Sims chronology
New Beat Bossa Nova Vol. 2 (1962)	Two Jims and Zoot (1964)	Inter-Action (1965)

Two Jims and Zoot (also reissued as Otra Vez) is an album by guitarists Jimmy Raney and Jim Hall with saxophonist Zoot Sims which was recorded in 1964 for the Mainstream label.

== Reception ==
Professional ratings
Review scores
Source	Rating
AllMusic	4.5/5 stars

AllMusic awarded the album 4½ stars and its review by Scott Yanow states "The cool-toned improvisations and boppish playing have a timeless quality about them although for the time period aspects of this music already sounded a bit old-fashioned".

== Track listing ==
1. "Hold Me" (Gerry Mulligan) - 2:55
2. "A Primera Vez" (Alcebíades Barcelos, Armando Marçal) - 4:19
3. "Presente de Natal" (Nelcy Noronha) - 3:06
4. "Morning of the Carnival" (Luiz Bonfá, Antônio Maria) - 4:34
5. "Este Seu Olhar" (Antônio Carlos Jobim) - 4:35
6. "Betaminus" (R. Ellen) - 3:18
7. "Move It" (Jim Hall) - 4:25
8. "All Across the City" (Hall) - 4:48
9. "Coisa Mais Linda" (Carlos Lyra, Vinicius de Moraes) - 4:20
10. "How About You?" (Leo Feist) - 3:52

== Personnel ==
- Jimmy Raney, Jim Hall - guitar
- Zoot Sims - tenor saxophone
- Steve Swallow - bass
- Osie Johnson - drums
