= Loose Blues =

Loose Bloose

Studio album by Bill Evans
- Released: 1983
- Recorded: August 21–22, 1962
- Studio: Nola Penthouse Sound Studios, New York City
- Genre: Jazz
- Length: 45:46
- Label: Milestone; MCD-9200-2
- Producer: Orrin Keepnews

Bill Evans chronology
Empathy (1962)	Loose Bloose (1983)	The Solo Sessions, Vol. 1 (1963)

Loose Bloose (released as Unknown Session in Japan) is an album by jazz pianist Bill Evans released on the Milestone label, featuring performances by Evans with Zoot Sims, Jim Hall, Ron Carter, and Philly Joe Jones, recorded in 1962.

== History ==
Loose Bloose was recorded for the Riverside label, but eventually dropped mostly because of Riverside's forthcoming bankruptcy and the pressures of Verve producer Creed Taylor, who wanted Evans on his Verve label. So the project was shelved, and the recordings were released posthumously in 1982 as part of The "Interplay" Sessions, after having been rediscovered in the Fantasy Records vaults. This was, in fact, believed to be a lost album since producer Orrin Keepnews could not find the master reels of the session dates, except for a take of "Loose Bloose". However, after a thorough research, he did succeed in finding the reels "stored in poorly marked tape boxes". The material was then assembled by Keepnews and Ed Michel. "Fudgesickle Built for Four" was named by Evans himself (reflecting his love of puns) and was a reference to "a bicycle built for two", a line from the popular song "Daisy Bell". Keepnews, recalling the sessions, stated that "My Bells", which is characterized by difficult tempo changes, took 25 takes to be recorded properly. Evans would only revisit "Time Remembered", "My Bells" and "Funkallero" for later recordings.

The recordings were released as their own standalone album – Unknown Session – by Riverside in Japan, 1983. They were later reissued in the west by Milestone under the title Loose Blues.

== Reception ==
The Allmusic review by Scott Yanow states: "Due to some difficulties during the recording process (none of the sidemen were familiar with the often complex numbers), the results were originally shelved and lost for a couple of decades. This CD reissue shows that the music was actually much better than originally thought..., It is a pity that Evans and Sims (a logical combination) never did record together again."

Professional ratings
Review scores
Source	Rating
Allmusic	4/5 stars

== Track listing ==
All compositions by Bill Evans

1. "Loose Bloose" - 7:07
2. "Loose Bloose" [alternate take] - 5:34
3. "Time Remembered" - 6:02
4. "Funkallero" - 6:13
5. "My Bells" - 5:24
6. "There Came You" - 5:52
7. "Fudgesickle Built for Four" - 4:31
8. "Fun Ride" - 5:15

Tracks 1–4 and 7 recorded on August 21, 1962; tracks 5, 6, 8 recorded on August 22, 1962.

== Personnel ==
- Bill Evans - piano
- Zoot Sims - tenor saxophone
- Jim Hall - guitar
- Ron Carter - bass
- Philly Joe Jones - drums
