= Septuple meter =

Musical stress pattern

21/8 as 3/4 with 7 subdivisions

21/8 as 7/4 with 3 subdivisions

Septuple meter (British: metre) or (chiefly British) septuple time is a meter with each bar (American: measure) divided into 7 notes of equal duration, usually 7/4 or 7/8 (or in compound meter, 21/8 time). The stress pattern can be 2+2+3, 3+2+2, or occasionally 2+3+2, although a survey of certain forms of mostly American popular music suggests that 2+2+3 is the most common among these three in these styles.

A time signature of 21/8, however, does not necessarily mean that the bar is a compound septuple meter with seven beats, each divided into three. This signature may, for example, be used to indicate a bar of triple meter in which each beat is subdivided into seven parts. In this case, the meter is sometimes characterized as "triple septuple time". It is also possible for a 21/8 time signature to be used for an irregular, or "additive" metrical pattern, such as groupings of 3 + 3 + 3 + 2 + 3 + 2 + 3 + 2 eighth notes.

Septuple meter can also be notated by using regularly alternating bars of triple and duple or quadruple meters, for example 4/4 + 3/4, or 6/8 + 6/8 + 9/8, or through the use of compound meters, in which two or three numerals take the place of the expected numerator 7, for example, 2+2+3/8, or 5+2/8.

== History ==
Before the 20th century, septuple time was rare in European concert music but is more commonly found in European folk music and in other world cultures.

=== Asia and the Middle East ===
In the Thai dance-drama genre lakhon nok and the masked dance-drama khon there is a unique group of songs based on a rhythmic cycle of seven beats, quite unlike the usual rhythmic structures of Thai traditional music. Portions of this repertoire of songs in additive meter date back to the Ayudhia period (1350–1767).

In the Carnatic music of south India, there are thirty-five tāla in five temporal species, multiplied by seven classes of measurement—one of the five species is septuple. The classes of measurement in this "formal" system consist of seven basic tālas (called sūḷādi talas). Each of these is built from three types of component durations: the one-beat anudruta, the two-beat druta, and the variable laghu, which may have three (tisra), four (caturaśra), five (khaṇḍa), seven (miśra), or nine (saṅkīrṇa) beats, and accounts for the five temporal species of each tāla. Two of the resulting thirty-five forms have seven beats in all: the khaṇda form of Rūpaka tāla, with one druta and a five-beat (khaṇda) laghu: 2+5, and the tisra form of Tripuṭa, with a three-beat laghu and two druta: 3+2+2. Tisra Tripuṭa is one of the principal talas of the system, and so is often called simply by its basic name, Tripuṭa. Khaṇda Rūpaka, on the other hand, is a comparative rarity. The more common form, caturaśra Rūpaka, has a laghu of four beats and so a total beat pattern of 2+4.

Carnatic music also has an "informal" system of tālas, which uses a selection of the formal tālas. These include the septuple Tripuṭa, to which is added a Cāpu (fast) version of it, called miśra Cāpu (3+2+2, or 3+4). Miśra Cāpu is one of the most characteristic rhythms in the music of southern India, accounting for well over half of the padam compositions by the 17th-century composer Kshetrayya, and occurs in some of the best-known kīrtanam works by Tyagaraja (1767–1847). The Hindustani tālas used in the north also include septuple patterns. The tala Rupak, for example, has seven beats. Tīvra (also known at Gīt-tāl) is also a septuple tāla. Two tālas, Dīpcandī and Jhūmrā, have fourteen beats in all, but are divided symmetrically into two halves of 3+4 beats each. The tālas Ādā-cautāl and Dhamār are also fourteen beats long, but the former is divided asymmetrically, and the latter is only partially symmetrical: It has several different patterns, the most common of which falls into two seven-beat halves, but with different internal divisions: 5+2 and 3+4, where the khālī (empty) beat marks the division of the cycle into two halves.

Folk music in Turkey employs metres consisting of five, seven, or eleven pulses, as well as metres with irregular subdivisions. In Turkish art music, the system of rhythmic modes called usul consist of rhythmic cycles of two to ten counting units. The pattern of seven beats is called devr-i hindi.

=== Balkan folk music ===
Septuple rhythms are characteristic of some European folk idioms, particularly in the Balkan countries. An example from Macedonia is the traditional tune "Jovano Jovanke", which can be transcribed in 7/8. Bulgarian dances are particularly noted for the use of a variety of irregular, or heterometric rhythms. The most popular of these is the rachenitsa, a type of khoro in a rapid septuple meter divided 2+2+3. In the Pirin area, the khoro has a rhythm subdivided 3+2+2, and two varieties of it are the pravo makedonsko ("straight Macedonian") and the mazhka rachenitsa ("men's rachenitsa"). Septuple rhythms are also found in Bulgarian vocal music, such as the koleda ritual songs sung by young men on Christmas Eve and Christmas to bless livestock, households, or specific family members.

Such irregular meters are also found throughout Greece, where they are sometimes identified as originating in neighboring countries. For example, in Epirus, a district bordering Albania, there is a style of singing in imitation of the sound of Byzantine bells, that employs microtonal intervals and is described by the singers themselves as "Albanian" or "pastoral Vlach". The rhythms vary, but sometimes is in bars of seven beats, particularly in the area around Mount Parnassus. The 7/8 rhythm of the kalamatianos from the same region, however, is regarded as purely Greek.

=== European art music ===
==== 18th century ====
The last movement of Joseph Haydn's Piano Sonata XVI:12, written as early as the 1750s, has been claimed to use exclusively seven-measure units in its background, if not in its foreground. Performers typically choose a tempo such that the notated 3/8 measure sounds like a single beat, projecting a perception of 21/8 septuple meter.

==== 19th century ====
Though rare in the 19th century, there are instances of septuple metre. Two examples from the piano repertoire entirely in septuple meter are Fugue No. 24, from 36 Fugues for Piano by Anton Reicha (notated in regularly alternating and 3/4 bars), and the Impromptu, Op. 32, no. 8, by Charles-Valentin Alkan, notated in 7/4 time. The theme and first eight (of thirteen) Variations on a Hungarian Song Op. 21, No. 2 by Johannes Brahms is in septuple time, notated as regular alternations of 3/4 and, though various accenting factors often obscure the perceived metre. In the last two of the five versions of "Promenade" from Pictures at an Exhibition by Modest Mussorgsky, 7/4 is mixed irregularly with other metres: (4th Promenade) 5/4, 6/4, and 7/4, with a single 3/4 bar at the end; (5th Promenade) four pairs of regularly alternating 5/4 and 6/4, then an irregular mixture of 5/4, 6/4, and 7/4 to the end.

Symphonic and choral works containing occasional septuple bars include the conjuration of soothsayers in L'enfance du Christ, Op. 25 (1854) by Hector Berlioz, which "has a relatively extended passage of septuple metre (ten bars of 7/4, then three of 4/4 and three of 3/4; the pattern repeats with four each of 4/4 and 3/4)", and the Dante Symphony by Franz Liszt, which has several bars in 7/4.

In operetta, parts of "Here's a man of jollity" in Gilbert and Sullivan's The Yeomen of the Guard (1888) is in 7/4, notated as alternating bars of 4/4 and 3/4. The rest is in a mixture of 5/4 and 4/4.

An example of chamber music from the later 19th century is found in the Piano Trio No. 3, Op. 101, by Brahms. In the third movement (Andante grazioso), the main (outer) sections are in 7/4 (notated as a recurring 3/4 + 2/4 + 2/4), while the central section is in compound-quintuple time: 15/8 (notated as 9/8 + 6/8) with 9/8 turnarounds, and an eight-bar coda in 9/8.

==== 20th century ====
Igor Stravinsky's name is often associated with rhythmic innovation in the 20th century, and septuple meter is sometimes found in his music—for example, the closing "General Rejoicing" section (Allegro non troppo), from rehearsal 203 to rehearsal 209, in his ballet The Firebird (1910) is written uniformly in 7/4 time. Much more characteristically, septuple bars in Stravinsky's scores are found in a context of constantly changing meters, as for example in his ballet The Rite of Spring (1911–13), where the object appears to be the combination of two- and three-note subdivisions in irregular groupings. For example, in Part II, third tableau, "Glorification of the Chosen Maiden", bars of 7/8 and 7/4 are interspersed with bars of 2/4, 3/8, 3/4, 4/8, 4/4, 5/8, 5/4, 6/8, 6/4, and 9/8 time. This treatment of rhythm subsequently became so habitual for Stravinsky that, when he composed his Symphony in C in 1938–40, he found it worth observing that the first movement had no changes of meter at all (though the metrical irregularities in the third movement of the same work were amongst the most extreme in his entire output).

So many other composers followed Stravinsky's example in the use of irregular meters that the occasional occurrence of septuple-time bars becomes unremarkable from the 1920s onward. This is as true for composers regarded as conservative as for those labeled "progressive" or "avant garde". In the former category, this rhythmic usage was characteristic of compositions from the 1920s and 1930s by Gustav Holst. Septuple bars, for example, are found in passages in his opera The Perfect Fool (1918–22)—notably the two "earth" themes in the ballet of the elements, and the arrival of the Princess, which is "a genuine example of the septuple measure as distinct from those arising merely from prosody"—and in A Choral Fantasia, Op. 51 (bars 70–98, 179–85, and 201–209 are in 7/4). Some of Maurice Ravel's music incorporated septuple meter: for example, the brief "Danse générale" from Part I of Daphnis et Chloé is in 7/4 (subdivided as 3+4), the finale of the Piano Trio freely alternates between 5/4 and 7/4, and the main theme of the finale of his Sonata for Violin and Cello is in "quasi 7/4" (notated as a recurring 2/4 + 2/4 + 3/4). An example from the next decade is Benjamin Britten's String Quartet No. 2, Op. 35 (1945), where bars 2 and 13 after rehearsal K in the first movement, "Allegro calmo senza rigore", are in 7/4, and from the 1950s, the second subject of the third movement, Allegro, of Dmitri Shostakovich's Piano Concerto No. 2, Op. 102 (1957), which is in a fast 7/8. Examples from more "progressive" composers include the first and third movements of the First Cantata, Op. 29 (1938–39), by Anton Webern, and the fourth movement (Intermezzo interrotto) of Béla Bartók's Concerto for Orchestra (1943).

Septuple meter is sometimes employed to characterize particular sections of compositions, such as single variations of pieces in variation form. One example is the third movement (Variations on a Ground), of Holst's Double Concerto for two violins and orchestra, Op. 49, where the 13th and 17th variations are in 7/4 time. An example from after the Second World War is found in Part I of Leonard Bernstein's The Age of Anxiety: Symphony No. 2, a theme-and-variations movement in which "Variation X: Più mosso" is notated in regularly alternating and 3/4 bars, each pair amounting to one 7/4 bar.

Compositions entirely or predominantly in septuple meter are less common. Five of Holst's settings of English translations of hymns from the ancient Sanskrit Rig Veda, composed between 1907 and 1912, are in septuple meter, specifically "Song of the Frogs" and "Creation" (songs 6 and 8 from his Hymns from the Rig Veda, Op. 24, for voice and piano, composed in 1907–08) as well as "Funeral Hymn" (Choral Hymns from the Rig Veda, Op. 26, Group 1 No. 3 for SATB chorus and orchestra or piano, composed between 1908 and 1910), "Hymn to the Waters" (Choral Hymns from the Rig Veda Group 3 no. 2 for SSA chorus and harp or piano, composed in 1909), and "Hymn to Manas" (Choral Hymns from the Rig Veda Group 4 no. 3 for TTBB chorus with orchestra or unaccompanied, composed in 1912). The last movement, "Precipitato", of the Piano Sonata No. 7 by the Russian composer Sergei Prokofiev, which is in 7/8, and Sensemayá, for orchestra, by the Mexican Silvestre Revueltas (predominantly in 7/8, with occasional interruptions in 7/16 time and a brief 7-bar interlude at rehearsal 23 of 9/8 (3/4 + 3/8)) are particularly well-known instances. Béla Bartók sometimes adopted septuple dance rhythms from the folk music of Eastern Europe, as in "Bulgarian Rhythm (1)" and the second of the "Six Dances in Bulgarian Rhythm", nos. 113 and 149 from Mikrokosmos, both of which are in 7/4. Other examples from the middle of the century include the 7/4 third movement, "Très Animé", of the Fantasia for saxophone, 3 horns, and string orchestra (1948), by Heitor Villa-Lobos, "In the First Pentatonic Minor Mode (En el 1er modo pentáfono menor)", no. 5 from 12 American Preludes for piano by Alberto Ginastera, in 7/8, and "Old Joe Has Gone Fishing" by Benjamin Britten (from the 1945 opera Peter Grimes), which is written in 7/4.

== Other notable compositions in septuple meter ==
- "Alien", by Lamb
- "And the Money Kept Rolling In (and Out)" from Evita by Andrew Lloyd Webber (7/8, except for a three-bar introduction in 4/4).
- "Ant-Man Main Theme" by Christophe Beck (7/4).
- "Another World of Beasts" from Final Fantasy VI by Nobuo Uematsu (7/8).
- "Barstool Warrior" by Dream Theater from the album Distance Over Time (7/4) with one brief measure of (6/4)
- "Beat Me, Daddy, Seven to the Bar" by Don Ellis (7/8).
- "La Bosniaque", fifth movement of the second pentacle ("Révérences engrenées") of Henri Pousseur's Automates en leur jardinet (2000–2001), 7/16, mislabeled 7/8.
- "Demons" by the National (7/4).
- "Desert Island Disk" by Radiohead(7/4)
- "Don't Eat the Yellow Snow" by Frank Zappa (7/4).
- "Dreaming in Metaphors" by Seal.
- "Estimated Prophet" by the Grateful Dead (7/4).
- "Etropolis" by Stefan Goldmann (7/16).
- "The Fish (Schindleria Praematurus)" by Yes (7/4).
- "Haggstrom", by C418, on Minecraft – Volume Alpha (7/4)
- "Lucky Seven" by Chris Squire (7/4).
- "Fix the Sky a Little", by 65daysofstatic.
- "I Was Brought to My Senses" by Sting
- "Mother" by the Police (7/4).
- "Pussy Wiggle Stomp" by Don Ellis (7/4).
- "Rubylove" by Cat Stevens (7/8).
- "Spiders" by Slipknot (7/4)
- "7/4 (shoreline)" by Broken Social Scene (7/4).
- "Solsbury Hill" by Peter Gabriel (7/4).
- "State of Mine" by IQ, the closing instrumental from the first part of Subterranea is an arrangement in 7/8 of a piano piece.
- "Stone Soup" by Ned McGowan (7/16).
- "Supplication" by the Grateful Dead.
- "Szamár Madár" by Venetian Snares (arrangement of a passage from Edward Elgar's Cello Concerto, in 7/4)
- "Theme from Tron" by Wendy Carlos is in slow 7/8 (4+3/8).
- "Ticks and Leeches" by Tool (7/4)
- "The Tihai" by Don Ellis (7/4)
- "Tombo in 7/4" by José Neto, Flora Purim, and Diana Moreira (7/4)
- "Turkish Bath" by Ron Myers, performed by the Don Ellis orchestra (7/4)
- "Unsquare Dance" by Dave Brubeck (7/8).
- "Waltz in 7/8" by Yanni (7/8).
- "What Would I Want? Sky" by Animal Collective is in 7/8
- "Whiplash" by Hank Levy is in (7/4) subdivided in multiple ways throughout the piece.
- "Wonder Woman Main Theme" by Hans Zimmer, for the 2017 Movie (7/8).
- "Words, Words, Words" (Martin's Laughing Song), from act 2 of Candide, by Leonard Bernstein (7/8).
- "World Away" by Tweedy (7/4).

=== Partially in septuple meter ===
- Adagio, second movement from String Quartet No. 2 (1955) by Benjamin Lees. "largely in 7/4 meter".
- "All You Need Is Love" by the Beatles. Verses in 7/4.
- "Anyone Who Had a Heart" by Burt Bacharach, sung by Dionne Warwick – 7/8 turnaround at the end of the bridge, as pointed out to Bacharach by Dionne Warwick. However the song features "5/4, 4/4, to 7/8 and resolving on 5/8 in only eight bars" according to Allmusic.
- "Baroque Bordello" by The Stranglers: on the verse, the guitar is in 7/8 while the other instruments play in 4/4.
- "The Battle of Epping Forest" from Selling England by the Pound by Genesis. The intro + verse are in 7/4, followed by several 4/4 sub-sections and then back to 7/4.
- "Box Elder" by Motion City Soundtrack: includes 7/8.
- "Breadcrumb Trail" by Slint, in Dave Hooper's 1997 arrangement, has verses and other sections in 7/4.
- "Brighter than a Thousand Suns" from A Matter of Life and Death by Iron Maiden. Main riff and chorus in 7/4, bridge in 4/4.
- "Cherokee" by Stephen Stills. The verses and the intro and outro are in 7/4.
- "Cinema Show" from Selling England by the Pound by Genesis concludes with an extended instrumental section in 7/8
- "Concerto Fantasy for Two Timpanists and Orchestra" by Philip Glass develops a theme in the third movement that shifts between 4/4 and 7/8.
- "Diary of a Madman" by Ozzy Osbourne. The verses are in 7/4.
- "Ethiopia" by Red Hot Chili Peppers is 7/4 except for a 4/4 chorus.
- "Heart of Glass" by Blondie has a break in 7/8 after the second chorus.
- "Heaven on Their Minds", from Jesus Christ Superstar, by Andrew Lloyd Webber. Mainly in 4/4, but turnarounds in b. 44–51 and 69–76 are in 7/8.
- "I Am the Doctor", by Murray Gold, from the soundtrack to the fifth series of Doctor Who.
- "I Tamper with the Evidence at the Murder Site of Odin" by Dethklok is in 7/8, except for two interludes in common time.
- "I Was Brought To My Senses" by Sting. Intro is in 4/4, but the rest is 7/4.
- "I Was Made For Loving You" by Tori Kelly and Ed Sheeran. Intro and chorus alternate 3/4 + 4/4
- "In the Dead of Night" by UK. Mainly in 7/4. After the chorus that is a riff in 4/4 + 4/4 + 5/8, ending in 4 bars 4/4.
- "In the House of Tom Bombadil" by Nickel Creek, alternates between 4/4 and 7/8.
- "Jive Talkin'" by Bee Gees has a recurring post-chorus synthesizer break notated as either 7/4 or alternating measures of 3/4 and 4/4
- "Jocko Homo" by Devo is primarily in 7/8, but changes to 4/4 partway through.
- "Laps in Seven", by Sam Bush (7/4). (except for the electric mandolin solo which is in 4/4 time)
- "Like a Beautiful Smile" by Sting. The main theme is three bars of 7/8 and one bar of 8/8. The chorus is in 8/8.
- "The Man Who Sailed Around His Soul" by XTC. Verses are in 7/8.
- "Meetings Along the Edge" by Philip Glass and Ravi Shankar develops two themes in 7 and one in 4 beats per measure.
- "Meheeco" by English group Sky. The second part features an alternation of 8/8 – 7/8. In the live versions, the drums would often continue playing 8/8 over the rest of the band's 7/8 bars, creating an isorhythm.
- "A Mix Tape", from Avenue Q, by Robert Lopez and Jeff Marx. Mostly in 4/4 time, with regularly alternating pairs of 7/8 and 4/4 in the opening and closing sections (spoken and vamped portions).
- "Money" by Pink Floyd. Predominantly in 7/4.
- "No Time for Games" by Midnight Oil has an introduction and various other parts in 7/4 and verse and chorus in 4/4.
- "Nothing on My Back" by Sum 41, from the album All Killer No Filler, has an opening riff in 7/4.
- "The Ocean" by Led Zeppelin. The song is built upon the drum groove and lead guitar line that is composed of one bar of 4/4 and one bar of 7/8.
- "Oh, Happy We" from act 1 of Candide by Leonard Bernstein. Verses are in 7/4, turnarounds in 3/4.
- "Outshined" by Soundgarden. Verses in 7/4.
- "Paranoid Android" by Radiohead. Producer Michael G noted that "Paranoid Android" "flips between 4/4 time and 7/8 time about 13 times".
- "Los peones de hacienda", from the ballet Estancia by Alberto Ginastera. Bars 27–28 (third and fourth bars following rehearsal 65) are in 7/8.
- "Pick Up Summer" by Fu Manchu is in quintuple meter created by regularly alternating 7/4 & 8/4.
- "Prequel to the Sequel" by Between the Buried and Me has some scattered bars in 7/8 and other time signatures.
- "Presto ruvido", no. 4 of Sechs Bagatellen for wind quintet (1953) by György Ligeti (all in 7/8 except b. 36, 39, and 51, in 3/8, 2/8, and 3/8, respectively).
- "Ring Out Solstice Bells" by Jethro Tull is in 7/4 alternating with 4/4 referencing its time signature with the lyric "seven maids move in seven time".
- "The River" by King Gizzard & the Lizard Wizard from their 2015 album Quarters! contains sections in both 7/8 and 5/4.
- "Schism" by Tool. Verse contains alternating measures of 5/8 and 7/8, while chorus contains alternating measures of 6/8 and 7/8.
- "Selkies: The Endless Obession" by Between the Buried and Me has a main riff that alternates between 7/8 and 6/8.
- "Seven" by Dave Matthews Band (verses in 7/4)
- Slava! A Political Overture by Leonard Bernstein. Large sections in 7/8, generally conducted as 2/8+2/8+3/8.
- "Speculation", composed by Shoji Meguro for the Persona 4 video game soundtrack. Largely in 7/4, with a bridge in 3/4.
- "Spoonman" by Soundgarden. The intro, verses, drum solo, and parts of the bridge are in 7/4 (sometimes transcribed as 14/8). Choruses, parts of the bridges, and guitar solo are in 4/4, and the spoons solo is in 6/8.
- "Suicide Mission" by Jack Wall for Mass Effect 2 "a large section or so of 7/4 throughout, particularly at the end".
- "Tattooed Love Boys" by The Pretenders. Verses alternate between 7/4 and 4/4.
- "The Temple" from Jesus Christ Superstar is in 7/4 except for Jesus's solo, which is in 4/4.
- "Them Bones" by Alice in Chains; the verses are in 7/8, and the chorus is in 4/4.
- "Thunderchild" by Jeff Wayne from his concept album War of the Worlds is primarily in 7/8.
- "Time" by Anthrax from the album Persistence of Time. Intro in 7/4.
- "Tom Sawyer" by Rush instrumental section in 7/8 with a few measures of 13/16
- "Two Toccatas" by George Antheil. The first toccata features a middle section in 7/8.
- Variations et fugue sur un thème original, Op. 42, by Zygmunt Stojowski. The theme is in 7/4, as are variations 2, 3, and 10.
- "La Villa Strangiato" by Rush has some sections in 7/8.
- "Wind It Up" by moe. has a long middle section in 7/4, while the rest of the song is in 4/4 and 6/8.

== See also ==
- List of musical works in unusual time signatures

== Sources ==
- Allan, Alex. n.d. "Grateful Dead Songs with Unusual Time Signatures". Alex Allan's personal website (archived 10 December 2016; accessed 7 June 2018).
- Anon. n.d. 'Tom Sawyer' by Rush". Songfacts.com (accessed 22 September 2013).
- Anon. 1896. "Indian Music". The Musical Times and Singing Class Circular, 37, no. 642 (1 August): 519–21.
- Anon. 1978. Unpaginated introduction to Bacharach and David (songbook). Hollywood: Almo Productions. Reprinted Bacharachonline.com (accessed 25 February 2015).
- Anon. 2011. "Red Hot Chili Peppers Debut New Songs at Japan's Summer Sonic—Video". NME Online Magazine Video Radio Mobile (16 August) (Accessed 10 January 2013).
- Anon. 2013. "Releases: The National—Trouble Will Find Me" 4ad.com (20 May; archive from 22 October 2015, accessed 6 June 2018).
- Banasiewicz, Bill. 1988. Rush Visions: The Official Biography. London and New York: Omnibus Press. ISBN 0-7119-1162-2.
- Bartók, Béla. 1940. Mikrokosmos: Progressive Piano Pieces = Pièces de piano progressives = Zongoramuzsika a kezdet legkezdetétöl, 6 vols. New York and London: Boosey & Hawkes.
- Bartók, Béla. 1946. Concerto for Orchestra, revised edition, 1993 (full score). London, New York, Bonn, Sidney, Tokyo: Boosey & Hawkes.
- Bennett, Dan (2008). The Total Rock Bassist. Van Nuys, California: Alfred Music Publishing. ISBN 0-7390-5269-1.
- Berg, Alban. 1925. Kammerkonzert für Klavier und Geige mit dreizehn Bläsern. Philharmonia no. 423. Vienna and London: Universal Edition.
- Bergeron, Guy (arr.). 2010. "Jovano Jovanke" (trad. Macedonian). Freescores.com (Accessed 10 October 2011).
- Bernstein, Leonard. 1993. The Age of Anxiety: Symphony No. 2, for piano and orchestra, after W. H. Auden, revised version, full score, corrected edition. [New York]: Jalni Publications, Inc., Boosey & Hawkes.
- Bernstein, Leonard. 1994. Candide: A Comic Operetta in Two Acts, Scottish Opera edition of the opera-house version (1989). Book by Hugh Wheeler, based on the satire by Voltaire; lyrics by Richard Wilbur, with additional lyrics by Stephen Sondheim, John Latouche, Dorothy Parker, Lillian Hellman, and Leonard Bernstein; edited by Charles Harmon. [New York]: Jalni Publications, Inc.; Boosey & Hawkes.
- Brahms, Johannes. 1972. Trios, für Klavier, Violine und Violoncello, nach Eigenschriften, Erstausgaben und Handexemplaren des Komponisten hrsg. von Ernst Herttrich; Fingersatz der Klavierstimme von Hans-Martin Theopold. Munich: G. Henle Verlag.
- Britten, Benjamin. 1945. Old Joe Has Gone Fishing. London: Boosey & Hawkes. ISMN 9790060014864
- Britten, Benjamin. 1946. Quartet No. 2 in C, Op. 36. London: Boosey & Hawkes.
- Buchanan, Donna A. 2001. "Bulgaria, §II: Traditional Music". The New Grove Dictionary of Music and Musicians, second edition, edited by Stanley Sadie and John Tyrrell. London: Macmillan Publishers.
- Cantrell, Jerry. 1992. "Them Bones" (sheet music). S.l.: Buttnugget Publishing.
- Chianis, Sotirios, and Rudolph M. Brandl. 2001. "Greece, §IV: Traditional Music". The New Grove Dictionary of Music and Musicians, second edition, edited by Stanley Sadie and John Tyrrell. London: Macmillan Publishers.
- Cowell, Henry. 1956. "Current Chronicle: United States: New York" The Musical Quarterly 42, no. 2 (April): 240–44.
- DeVoto, Mark. 2000. "Harmony in the Chamber Music". In The Cambridge Companion to Ravel, edited by Deborah Mawer, 97–117. Cambridge and New York: Cambridge University Press. ISBN 978-0-521-64856-1.
- Eddie, William Alexander. 2007. Charles Valentin Alkan: His Life and His Music. Aldershot, England; Burlington, Vermont: Ashgate. ISBN 1-84014-260-X
- Evans, Edwin. 1923. "The Perfect Fool". Musical Times 64, no. 964 (1 June): 389–93.
- Fenlon, Sean. 2002. "The Exotic Rhythms of Don Ellis". DMA diss. Baltimore: Johns Hopkins University, Peabody Institute. ISBN 0-493-60448-0.
- Fienberg, Gary Andrew. 2004. "It Doesn't Have to Be Sanctified to Swing: A Musical Biography of Don Ellis". PhD diss. Pittsburgh: Carnegie Mellon University. ISBN 0-496-86817-9.
- Frampton, John Ross. 1926. "Some Evidence for the Naturalness of the Less Usual Rhythms". Musical Quarterly 12, no. 3 (July): 400–405.
- Future Music. 2016. "Classic Album: Lamb on Fear of Fours". musicradar.com (accessed 5 February 2020).
- Gilbert, W[illiam]. S., and Arthur Sullivan. n.d. The Yeomen of the Guard (vocal score), revised edition. London: Chappell & Co., Ltd.
- Ginastera, Alberto. 1946. 12 American Preludes (Doce Preludios Americanos), 2 vols. New York: Carl Fischer.
- Ginastera, Alberto. 1955. Estancia: Ballet in One Act and Five Scenes. Reduction for piano. Buenos Aires: Barry Editorial, Com., Ind., S. R. L.; [n.p.]: Boosey & Hawkes.
- Griffiths, Paul. March 1982. "Maxwell Davies's Piano Sonata". Tempo, New Series, no. 140: 5–9.
- Holst, Gustav. 1973. Double Concerto, Op. 49, for two violins and orchestra. Revised edition by Imogen Holst. London: Curwen Edition, Faber Music Ltd.; New York: G. Schirmer Inc. First published in 1930 by J Curwen & Sons Ltd.
- Holst, Gustav. 1977. A Choral Fantasia, Op. 51, edited by Imogen Holst. London, Zürich, Mainz, and New York: Ernst Eulenburg Ltd.
- Hooper, Dave. 1997. "Slint—Breadcrumb Trail Tab, for Two Guitars and Bassline". Guitaretab.com (Accessed 23 June 2013).
- Hughes, Kevin. 2009. Stephen Stills: 7 Years That Rocked the Music World: SoloStills KevinHughesMusic.com (accessed 1 August 2015).
- Janssen, Guillaume. 2013. "Nomad Soul Collective: Murmuration". Spellbinding Music website (12 February) (Accessed 15 August 2013).
- Kamien, Roger. 1980. Music: An Appreciation, second edition. New York: McGraw-Hill. ISBN 0-07-033279-7.
- Kelly, Tori, and Ed Sheeran. 2015. "I Was Made for Loving You" [S.l.]: Tori Kelly Publishing and Sony/ATV Songs LLC.
- Kirkman, Jon. 2007. "Interview With Chris Squire". In Fish Out of Water, deluxe expanded edition (disc 2, track 3). Sanctuary Records Group Ltd.
- Lawrence, Eddy. 2006. "Easy Star All Stars". Time Out (14 August). Accessed 24 October 2008.
- Lester, Joel. 1986. The Rhythms of Tonal Music. Carbondale: Southern Illinois University Press. ISBN 978-0-8093-1282-5.
- Ligeti, György. 1973. Sechs Bagatellen für Bläserquintett (Five parts: flute, oboe, clarinet in B-flat, horn in F, bassoon). Mainz and New York: Schott.
- Lloyd Webber, Andrew (music), and Tim Rice (lyrics). 1970. Jesus Christ Superstar, vocal score, selections. New York: Universal—MCA Music Pub.; Miami: Warner Bros. Publications. ISBN 0-88188-541-X
- Lloyd Webber, Andrew (music), and Tim Rice (lyrics). 1979. Evita, vocal score, selections. Melville, New York: Leeds Music Corp, MCA Music.
- Lopez, Robert, and Jeff Marx. 2004. "A Mix Tape." In Avenue Q (piano conductor score), by Robert Lopez and Jeff Marx, 76–82. vome.org (archive from 28December 2017; accessed 28 October 2019).
- Macdonald, Hugh. 2001. "Alkan [Morhange], (Charles-)Valentin". The New Grove Dictionary of Music and Musicians, second edition, edited by Stanley Sadie and John Tyrrell. London: Macmillan Publishers.
- Mawer, Deborah. 2000. "Ballet and the Apotheosis of the Dance". In The Cambridge Companion to Ravel, edited by Deborah Mawer, 140–61. Cambridge and New York: Cambridge University Press. ISBN 978-0-521-64856-1. doi:10.1017/CCOL9780521640268.007.
- Moe. (musical group). 2008. Best of Moe: Guitar, Bass, Vocal, transcribed by Jeff Jacobson. [New York]: Cherry Lane Music. ISBN 978-1-57560-947-8.
- Montfort, Matthew. n.d. "North Indian Talas". Ancient-Future.com (Accessed 13 January 2013).
- Moore, Sidney. 1969. "Thai Songs in 7/4 Meter". Ethnomusicology 13, no. 2 (May): 309–12.
- Murphy, Scott. 2012. "Septimal Time in an Early Finale of Haydn". Intégral 26:97–130.
- Murphy, Scott. 2016. "'Cohn's Platonic Model and the Regular Irregularities of Recent Popular Multimedia'". Music Theory Online 22/3.
- Mussorgsky, Modest Petrovich. 1914. Tableaux d'une exposition (Pictures at an Exhibition): 10 Pieces for Piano, edited by O. Thümer. [N.p.]: Augener; London: Stainer and Bell Ltd; New York: Galaxy Music Corporation.
- Neto, José, Flora Purim, and Diana Moreira. 2005. "Tombo in 7/4—Samba de Janeiro". In Non-Stop to Brazil, 2 vols., 2:242. Angelo Publishing Company.
- OC ReMix Community. 2010. "Composer Interview: Wall of Sound" (4 May). Overclocked Remix website (Accessed 13 April 2012).
- Okada, Mike. 2013. "The National 'Demons'". Vancouver Weekly online (Accessed 2 May).
- Perkins, Wayne L. 2000. "Don Ellis' Use of 'New Rhythms' in His Compositions : The Great Divide (1969), Final Analysis (1969) and Strawberry Soup (1971)" (vol. 1); "Original Compositions: She's Only 19 (1999), Malibu Shuffle (1999) and Cruisin' P.C.H. (1999)" (vol. 2). Ph.D. diss. Los Angeles: University of California Los Angeles.
- Plait, Phil. 2012. "Bad Astronomy [blog]: I Am the Piano Doctor Man". Discover Magazine (8 January) (Accessed 3 March 2012).
- Pousseur, Henri. 2001. Automates en leur jardinet. Milan: Edizioni Suvini Zerboni.
- Powers, Harold S., and Richard Widdess. 2001. "India, subcontinent of, §III, 4: Theory and practice of classical music: Rhythm & tāla". The New Grove Dictionary of Music and Musicians, second edition, edited by Stanley Sadie and John Tyrrell. London: Macmillan Publishers.
- Prokofiev, Sergei. 1955. Sobranie sochinenii [Собрание сочинений, "Collected Works"], 20 vols. Moscow: Gos. Muzykalnoe Izd-vo.
- Read, Gardner. 1964. Music Notation: A Manual of Modern Practice. Boston: Allyn and Bacon, Inc.
- Reicha, Anton. 1973. 36 Fugen für Klavier, edited by Václav Jan Sýkora. Kassel: Bärenreiter.
- Reinhard, Kurt, and Martin Stokes. 2001a. "Turkey, II. Folk Music". The New Grove Dictionary of Music and Musicians, second edition, edited by Stanley Sadie and John Tyrrell. London: Macmillan Publishers.
- Reinhard, Kurt, and Martin Stokes. 2001b. "Turkey, IV. Art Music: 3 'Usul'". The New Grove Dictionary of Music and Musicians, second edition, edited by Stanley Sadie and John Tyrrell. London: Macmillan Publishers.
- Revueltas, Silvestre. 1949. Sensemayá. G. Schirmer's Edition of Study Scores of Orchestral Works and Chamber Music 51. New York: G. Schirmer, Inc.
- Rotondi, James. 1994. "Alone in the Superunknown." Guitar Player (April):.
- Rushton, Julian (1983). The Musical Language of Berlioz. Cambridge Studies in Music. Cambridge and New York: Cambridge University Press. ISBN 978-0-521-24279-0.
- Sadie, Stanley. 1965. "Chichester: Southern Cathedrals Festival". The Musical Times 106, no. 1471 (September): 693–94.
- Sakimoto, Hitoshi and Asako Niwa. 1994. Final Fantasy VI: Original Sound Version. Tokyo: Square Enix Co., Ltd. Distributed by Doremi Music Publishing Co. Ltd. ISBN 978-4-8108-2634-0.
- Sander, Ed. 1999. "1997: IQ: Subterranea" (part 1). DPRP: Dutch Progressive Rock Page. (Accessed 3 December 2010)
- Saull, Jordan Peter (28 August 2015). "Appendix A: NI and Ternary Metered Jazz Compositions 1900–1969". Non-Isochronous Meter: A Study of cross-cultural practice, analytic technique, and implications for jazz pedagogy (PhD). York University. hdl:10315/30023.
- Seal, and Gus Isidore. 1994. "Dreaming in Metaphors". London: Perfect Songs Limited.
- Shostakovich, Dmitri. 1983. Sobranie sochinenii tom 13 [Собрание сочинений том 13, Collected Works volume 13]. Moscow: Izdatelstvo "Muzyka".
- Sliwa, Richard. 1998–2005. "Sky 3". plum.cream.org website (accessed 10 January 2015).
- Stevens, Cat. 1991. Classic Cat Stevens: A Collection of All the Music from Four Landmark Cat Stevens Albums. New York: Amsco Publications. ISBN 0-8256-1285-3 (US); ISBN 0-7119-2316-7 (UK)
- Sting. 2003. Sacred Love, music arranged by Jack Long. Bury St. Edmunds: Magnetic, EMI.
- Stojowski, Sigismond. 1923. Variations et Fugue sur un thème original pour piano. Op. 42 (score). Paris: Au Ménestrel, 1923.
- Stravinsky, Igor. 1964. The Firebird (score). Moscow: Gos. muzykal'noe izd-vo. Reprinted Mineola NY: Dover Publications, 1987.
- Stravinsky, Igor. 1970. The Rite of Spring (Le Sacre du printemps (score). New York: International Music Company.
- Teachout, Terry. 2001. "Bluegrass that Can Twang and Be Cool, Too" (page 2 of 3). The New York Times (27 May). (Accessed 28 November 2007).
- Vai, Steve. 1995. Alien Love Secrets (guitar/tab)). [N.p.]: Sy Vy Music; Milwaukee: MCA Music Publishers. ISBN 0-7935-4449-1.
- Villa-Lobos, Heitor. 1963. Fantasia, for saxophone, 3 horns, and string orchestra. New York: Southern Music Publishing Co., Inc.; Hamburg: Peer Musikverlag G.m.b.H.
- Warrack, John. 1963. "A New Look at Gustav Holst". The Musical Times 104, no. 1440 (February): 100–103.
- Wayne, Jeff. 1978. The War of the Worlds (musical score). New York and London: Wise Publications.
- Webern, Anton. 1957. I. Kantate, für Sopran-Solo, gemischten Chor und Orchester, Op. 29. Philharmonia no. 447. Vienna and London: Universal Edition.
- Weisman, Loren. 2010. The Artist's Guide to Success in the Music Business. Bothell, WA: Book Publishers Network. ISBN 978-1-935359-33-3 (Accessed 11 April 2012).
- White, Eric Walter. 1979. Stravinsky: The Composer and His Works, second edition. Berkeley and Los Angeles: The University of California Press. ISBN 0-520-03985-8.
- Wiehmayer, Theodor. 1917. Musikalische Rhythmik und Metrik. Magdeburg: Heinrichshofen's Verlag.
- Wolinkski, Paul. 2014. "65daysofstatic – The Fall of Math: ten years later with Paul Wolinski". Thrash Hits. 26 March 2014 (accessed 5 February 2020).
- Wright, Danny. 2013. "Track Reviews: The National—Demons". DIY Weekly's blog page, thisisfakediy.co.uk (9 April) (Accessed 2 May 2013).
