= Shock Treatment (Don Ellis album) =

Studio album by Don Ellis
- Released: 1968
- Recorded: February 14 & 15, 1968
- Genre: Jazz
- Length: 66:36 CD reissue with bonus tracks
- Label: Columbia; CS 9668
- Producer: John Hammond

Don Ellis chronology
Electric Bath (1967)	Shock Treatment (1968)	Autumn (1968)

Shock Treatment is an album by trumpeter Don Ellis recorded in 1968 and released on the Columbia label.

== Reception ==
Professional ratings
Review scores
Source	Rating
Allmusic	3/5 stars
The Penguin Guide to Jazz	3/4 stars
Rolling Stone	(positive)
The Rolling Stone Jazz Record Guide	3/5 stars

Rolling Stone writer John Grissim wrote on the album's release that "Shock Treatment isn't really. But it does offer ten tightly arranged compositions notable for brassy melodic lines superimposed on a rhythmically complex percussion base. The album's desirability as an addition to a record collection is largely dependent upon whether you have a taste for a big band sound". The Allmusic site awarded the album 3 stars stating "Don Ellis was such a talented trumpeter, composer, and organizer that everything he recorded as a leader has at least some unusual moments worth exploring. His big bands were characterized by big brassy arrangements, odd meters that somehow always swung, lots of trumpet solos by Ellis, and an often visceral excitement. Although not equal to his best records such as Electric Bath, this late recording of Ellis' band is filled with all these traits, and thus exudes lots of excitement and electricity". The Penguin Guide to Jazz said "There are signs that Ellis was moving in a more commercial direction at this point, perhaps aware that jazz was still losing ground to pop and rock, though he must have known that as long as popular music was dance-driven it was unlikely that his work would have a major market presence".

== Track listing ==
All compositions by Don Ellis except as indicated

1. "A New Kind of Country" (Hank Levy) - 4:10
2. "Night City" (Don Ellis, Kelly MacFadden) - 2:56
3. "Homecoming" - 3:02
4. "Mercy Maybe Mercy" (Levy) - 3:24
5. "Zim" (John Magruder) - 4:03
6. "Opus 5" (Howlett Smith) - 9:23
7. "Star Children" - 3:25
8. "Beat Me Daddy, Seven to the Bar" - 6:16
9. "Milo's Theme" - 4:28
10. "Seven Up" (Smith) - 4:03
11. "The Tihai" - 8:48
12. "Zim" [alternate take] (Magruder) - 4:04 Bonus track on CD reissue
13. "I Remember Clifford" (Benny Golson) - 5:29 Bonus track on CD reissue
14. "Rasty" - 2:52 Bonus track on CD reissue

== Personnel ==
- Don Ellis - trumpet, arranger
- Alan Weight, Ed Warren, Glenn Stuart, Bob Harmon - trumpet
- Vince Diaz, Ron Myers, Dave Sanchez - trombone
- Terry Woodson - bass trombone
- Ruben Leon, Joe Lopez, Joe Roccisano - alto saxophone, soprano saxophone, flute
- Ira Shulman - tenor saxophone, flute, piccolo flute, clarinet
- Ron Starr - tenor saxophone, flute, clarinet
- John Magruder - baritone saxophone, flute, clarinet, bass clarinet
- Mike Lang - piano, electric piano, clavinet
- Frank DeLaRosa, Dave Parlato - bass
- Ray Neapolitan - bass, sitar
- Alan Estes - timbales, percussion
- Steve Bohannon - drums
- Carlos "Patato" Valdes, Chino Valdes - bongos, congas
- Mark Stevens, Ralph Humphrey - timbales, percussion, vibraphone
