= Live in 3 2/3 / 4 Time =

Live in 3 2/3/4 Time

Live album by Don Ellis
- Released: 1967
- Recorded: October 10, 1966 and March 27, 1967; The Pacific Jazz Festival, Costa Mesa and Shelly's Manne-Hole, Los Angeles
- Genre: Jazz
- Length: 73:05 CD reissue with bonus tracks
- Label: Pacific Jazz; PJ 10112
- Producer: Richard Bock

Don Ellis chronology
Don Ellis Orchestra 'Live' at Monterey! (1966)	Live in 3 2/3/4 Time (1967)	Electric Bath (1969)

Live in 3 2/3/4 Time is a live album by trumpeter Don Ellis recorded in 1966 at the Pacific Jazz Festival and Shelly's Manne-Hole in 1967 and released on the Pacific Jazz label. The title comes from the composition "Upstart", which is in 11/8 time with a 3+3+3+2 feel, cheekily referred to as ^{3 2/3}_{4} time.

== Reception ==
Professional ratings
Review scores
Source	Rating
Allmusic	4.5/5 stars
The Penguin Guide to Jazz	3/4 stars

The Allmusic site awarded the album 4 1/2 stars stating "The Don Ellis Orchestra really came into its own during the period covered by this CD (1966–1967), playing perfectly coherent solos in ridiculous time signatures... Fun music". The Penguin Guide to Jazz called it "entertaining and provocative".

== Track listing ==
All compositions by Don Ellis except as indicated

Side one
No.	Title	Writer(s)	Length
1.	"Orientation"		11:20
2.	"Angel Eyes"	Earl Brent, Matt Dennis	5:41
3.	"Freedom Jazz Dance"	Eddie Harris	3:54

Side two
No.	Title	Writer(s)	Length
1.	"Barnum's Revenge"	Ruben Leon	4:36
2.	"Upstart"		9:02
3.	"Thetis"	Hank Levy	8:27

Bonus tracks on CD reissue

1. "Bossa Nueva Nova" (Levy) – 5:30
2. "Opus Five" (Howlett Smith) – 9:53
3. "Seven Up" (Smith) – 4:39
4. "One Note" (Jaki Byard) – 2:24
5. "Freedom Jazz Dance" [alternative version] (Harris) – 7:39
- Recorded at The Pacific Jazz Festival in Costa Mesa, California on October 8, 1966 (tracks 1–3) and at Shelly's Manne-Hole in Los Angeles, California on March 27, 1967 (tracks 4–11). (The CD liner notes incorrectly give the date of the Pacific Jazz Festival performance as October 10.)

== Personnel ==
- Don Ellis – trumpet, arranger
- Alan Weight, Ed Warren, Glenn Stuart, Bob Harmon – trumpet
- Ron Myers (tracks 1–3), Dave Wells, Dave Sanchez (tracks 4–11) – trombone
- Terry Woodson – bass trombone
- Ruben Leon – alto saxophone, soprano saxophone, flute
- Tom Scott – alto saxophone, saxello, flute (tracks 1–3)
- Joe Roccisano – alto saxophone, soprano saxophone, flute, clarinet (tracks 4–11)
- Ira Shulman, Ron Starr – tenor saxophone, flute, clarinet
- John Magruder – baritone saxophone, flute, clarinet, bass clarinet
- David MacKay – piano
- Frank DeLaRosa, Chuck Domanico (tracks 1–3), Ray Neapolitan, Dave Parlato (tracks 4–11) – bass
- Alan Estes – drums, timbales
- Steve Bohannon – drums
- Chino Valdes – bongos, congas
- Mark Stevens – percussion (tracks 1–3)
