= Connection (Don Ellis album) =

Studio album by Don Ellis
- Released: 1972
- Recorded: 1972
- Genre: Jazz
- Length: 46:37
- Label: Columbia; KC 31766
- Producer: Teo Macero

Don Ellis chronology
Tears of Joy (1971)	Connection (1972)	Soaring (1973)

Connection is an album by trumpeter/bandleader Don Ellis recorded in 1972 and released on the Columbia label. The album features big band arrangements of pop hits of the day along with Ellis' "Theme from The French Connection", which won him a Grammy Award for Best Instrumental Arrangement in 1973.

== Reception ==
Professional ratings
Review scores
Source	Rating
Allmusic	3/5 stars
All About Jazz	3/5 stars
The Penguin Guide to Jazz Recordings	2.5/4 stars
The Rolling Stone Jazz Record Guide	1/5 stars

Thom Jurek of Allmusic said, "Ellis devotees will no doubt delight in Connection because of its abundance of sass, humor, and imagination, while jazz purists will shake their heads in disgust and others will greet the album with mix of curious bewilderment, a good-natured (hopefully) chuckle, and a perverse kind of glee". On All About Jazz, Jim Santella observed, "the unique character of Ellis' earlier work is missing on this recently reissued recording from 1972. He and the bandmembers solo less often, preferring instead to let the music flow with popular melodies. Vocals are added to several selections. Electric guitar and electric bass take center stage much of the time. Keyboards surround the band with lush scenery. Still, some of Ellis' trademark features are still there. His trumpet rages powerfully on 'Superstar' and his flugelhorn floats gently on 'Alone Again (Naturally)'."

== Track listing ==
1. "Put It Where You Want It" (Joe Sample) - 4:26
2. "Alone Again (Naturally)" (Gilbert O'Sullivan) - 2:36
3. "Superstar" (Tim Rice, Andrew Lloyd Webber) - 4:07
4. "I Feel the Earth Move" (Carole King) - 3:59
5. "Theme from The French Connection" (Don Ellis) - 3:50
6. "Conquistador" (Gary Brooker, Keith Reid) - 3:36
7. "Roundabout" (Jon Anderson, Steve Howe) - 4:31
8. "Chain Reaction" (Hank Levy) - 9:04
9. "Goodbye to Love" (John Bettis, Richard Carpenter) - 3:36
10. "Lean on Me" (Bill Withers) - 3:06
11. "Train to Get There" (Richard Halligan) - 3:46

== Personnel ==
- Don Ellis – trumpet, flugelhorn, arranger
- Fred Selden – alto saxophone, flute, soprano saxophone, piccolo, alto flute, arranger
- Vince Denham – alto saxophone, tenor saxophone, soprano saxophone, flute, piccolo,
- Sam Falzone – tenor saxophone, clarinet, flute, arranger
- Gary Herbig – baritone saxophone, soprano saxophone, clarinet, flute, oboe
- Paul Bogosian, Bruce Mackay, Gil Rathel, Glenn Stuart – trumpet, flugelhorn
- Sidney Muldrow – French horn
- Glenn Ferris – trombone
- Ken Sawhill – bass trombone
- Doug Bixby – tuba
- Jay Graydon – guitar
- Milcho Leviev – piano, electric piano, organ, clavinet, arranger
- Dave McDaniel – bass
- Ralph Humphrey – drums
- Ron Dunn – drums, percussion
- Lee Pastora – congas
- Earle Corry, Joel Quivey – electric violin
- Renita Koven – electric viola
- Pat Kudzia – electric cello
- Earle Corry, Richard Halligan, Hank Levy – arranger
