= Virgin land (disambiguation) =

Virgin land or frontier are areas near or beyond a boundary.

Virgin Land may also refer to:

- "Virgin Land", a short story in the Doctor Who anthology Short Trips: Zodiac
- Virgin Lands campaign, a Russian initiative
- Virgin Land: The American West as Symbol and Myth, a 1950 book by Henry Nash Smith
- Virgin Land (album), a 1974 album by Airto Moreira
