= Electric Bath =

Studio album by Don Ellis Orchestra

- Cover art for the album, featuring The Turkish Bath by Jean-Auguste-Dominique Ingres

Studio album by Don Ellis Orchestra
- Released: 1967
- Recorded: September 19 & 20, 1967
- Studio: Columbia Recording Studios, Hollywood, California
- Genre: Jazz fusion
- Length: 44:43
- Label: Columbia; CS 9585
- Producer: John Hammond

Don Ellis chronology
Live in 3 2/3/4 Time (1966–67)	Electric Bath (1967)	Shock Treatment (1968)

Electric Bath is an album by trumpeter Don Ellis recorded in 1967 and released on the Columbia label.

Electric Bath was a Grammy nominee in 1968 and that same year won "Album of the Year" in the annual Down Beat readers poll. This album was Don's first studio recording with his big band and his first Columbia Records release. It was produced by noted jazz record producer John Hammond.

== Reception ==
Professional ratings
Review scores
Source	Rating
AllMusic	4.5 stars
The Penguin Guide to Jazz	4/4 stars
The Rolling Stone Jazz Record Guide	5/5 stars
Encyclopedia of Popular Music	5/5 stars

Scott Yanow for AllMusic states, "For the first time Ellis opened his band to the influence of rock (making liberal use of electronics) and the results lend themselves to some hilarity". The Penguin Guide to Jazz said "No one sounded like this. Tough as it sometimes is, Ellis' music is never less than exhilarating".

== Track listing ==
All compositions by Don Ellis except as indicated

1. "Indian Lady" – 8:06
2. "Alone" (Hank Levy) – 5:32
3. "Turkish Bath" (Ron Myers) – 10:16
4. "Open Beauty" – 8:29
5. "New Horizons" – 12:20
6. "Turkish Bath" [Single] (Myers) – 2:52 Bonus track on CD reissue
7. "Indian Lady" [Single] – 2:58 Bonus track on CD reissue

== Personnel ==
- Don Ellis – trumpet, arranger
- Alan Weight, Ed Warren, Glenn Stuart, Bob Harmon – trumpet
- Ron Myers, Dave Sanchez – trombone
- Terry Woodson – bass trombone
- Ruben Leon, Joe Roccisano – alto saxophone, soprano saxophone, flute
- Ira Shulman – tenor saxophone, flute, piccolo flute, clarinet
- Ron Starr – tenor saxophone, flute, clarinet
- John Magruder – baritone saxophone, flute, clarinet, bass clarinet
- Mike Lang – piano, electric piano, clavinet
- Frank DeLaRosa, Dave Parlato – bass
- Ray Neapolitan – bass, sitar
- Alan Estes – vibraphone, percussion
- Steve Bohannon – drums
- Chino Valdes – bongos, congas
- Mark Stevens – timbales, percussion, vibraphone
