= Don Ellis =

American musician (1934–1978)

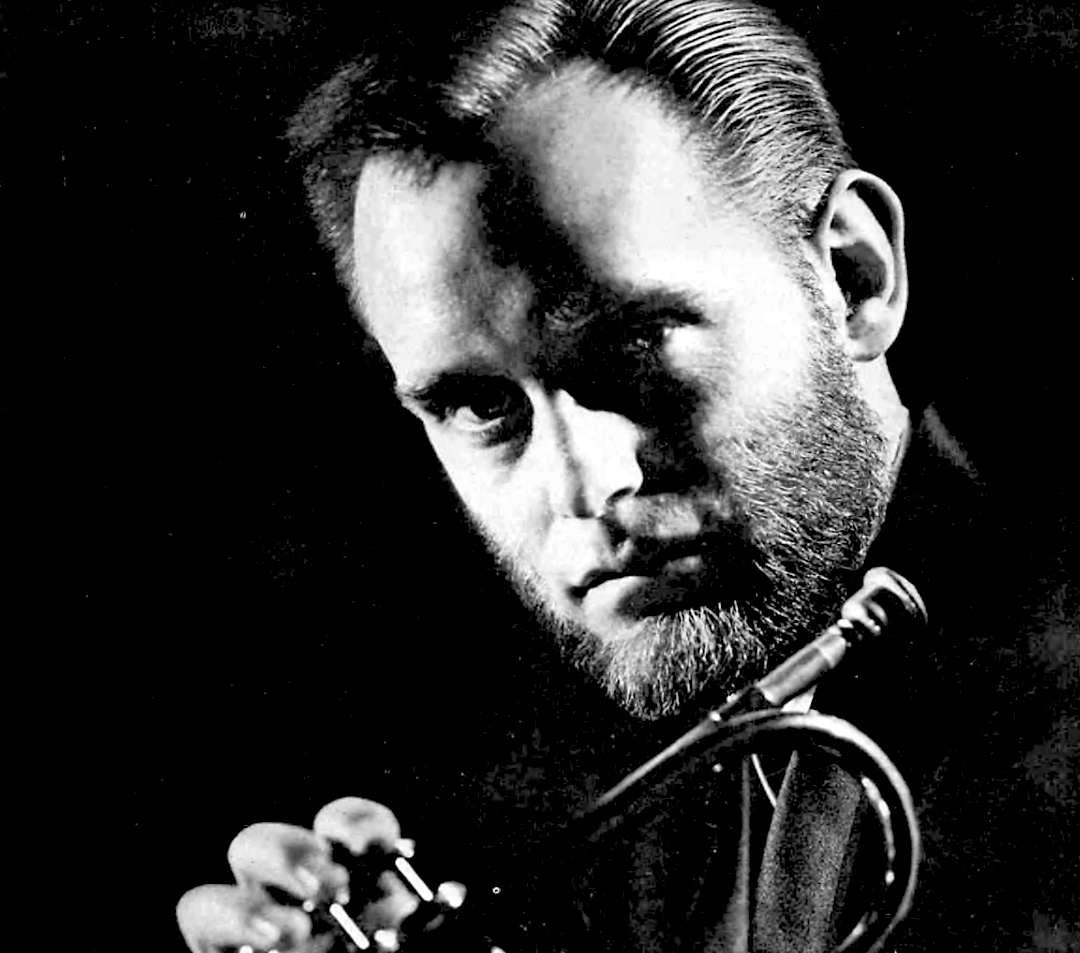
- Ellis in a 1968 DownBeat advertisement

Background information
- Born: Donald Johnson Ellis; July 25, 1934; Los Angeles, California, U.S.
- Died: December 17, 1978 (aged 44) Hollywood, California, U.S.
- Genres: Jazz; big band; avant-garde; jazz fusion
- Occupations: Musician, composer, arranger
- Instruments: Trumpet, drums
- Years active: 1956–1978
- Labels: CBS, Candid, Atlantic, Pacific Jazz, MPS

Donald Johnson Ellis (July 25, 1934 – December 17, 1978) was an American jazz trumpeter, drummer, composer, and bandleader. He is best known for his extensive musical experimentation, particularly in the area of time signatures. Later in his life he worked as a film composer, contributing a score to 1971's The French Connection and 1973's The Seven-Ups.

== Early life ==
Ellis was born in Los Angeles, California, on July 25, 1934. His father was a Methodist minister and his mother a church organist. He attended West High School in Minneapolis, MN. After attending a Tommy Dorsey Big Band concert, he first became interested in jazz. Other early inspirations were Louis Armstrong and Dizzy Gillespie. He graduated from Boston University in 1956 with a music composition degree.

== Early career ==
Ellis's first job was with the late Glenn Miller's band, then directed by Ray McKinley. He stayed with the band until September 1956, when he joined the U.S. Army's Seventh Army Symphony Orchestra and the Soldiers' Show Company. Ellis was transferred to Frankfurt, Germany for duty. In the Army band, Ellis met pianist Cedar Walton, and saxophonists Eddie Harris and Don Menza. While in that band Ellis had his first opportunity to compose and arrange for a big band.

After two years, Don Ellis left the Army band and moved to Greenwich Village in New York City. He was able to get some work, but mainly with dance bands and other local work. He toured briefly with bandleader Charlie Barnet and joined the Maynard Ferguson band in spring of 1959. He remained with Ferguson for nine months.

== New York avant-garde ==
Shortly thereafter, Ellis became involved in the New York City avant-garde jazz scene. He appeared on albums by Charles Mingus, Eric Dolphy, and George Russell, working in that sextet for two years. Under his own name, Ellis led several sessions with small groups between 1960 and 1962, which featured, among others, Jaki Byard, Paul Bley, Gary Peacock, Ron Carter, Charlie Persip, and Steve Swallow. The last one, Essence, was recorded in mid-July 1962.

On 3 June 1962, Ellis performed the jazz liturgy Evensong, composed by Edgar Summerlin. The performance took place at the First International Jazz Festival in Washington, D.C., and was broadcast on Look Up and Live on 12 August 1962. Ellis performed alongside Lou Gluckin on trumpet, J. R. Monterose on tenor saxophone, Eric Dolphy on flute, Slide Hampton on trombone, Dick Lieb on bass trombone, Barry Galbraith on guitar, Ron Carter on bass, and Charlie Persip on drums.

== Europe and America ==
In October 1962, Ellis traveled to Poland to take part in the 1962 Jazz Jamboree in Warsaw; his quartet performance was partially documented on a Polish-only 10-inch (250 mm) EP. Ellis chronicled his experience in an article called Warsaw Diary, which was printed in the January 3rd, 1963 issue of DownBeat magazine. In December, Ellis participated in the NDR Jazz Workshop in Hamburg, Germany, and in early 1963, traveled to Stockholm, Sweden. While there, he became somewhat well known for his experimentation with happenings, similar to those used by members of the Fluxus art movement.

Back in New York, Ellis formed the Improvisational Workshop Orchestra, which gave its debut performance on February 10, 1963 at the Five Spot. (Another tape of the same group is listed in the Don Ellis Collection as being recorded on Feb. 9th, but it may be a rehearsal tape.) The performance had a quality similar to those Ellis gave in Sweden: unusual artistic devices were employed, such as performers using cards to determine event orders, and musicians using their instruments to interpret a painter's work. Some uncommon musical elements were employed, such as the use of Arabian rhythms and scales, and foot shuffling.

== New rhythms and the Third Stream ==
In 1964, Ellis began graduate studies in ethnomusicology at UCLA where he studied with Indian musician Harihar Rao. Greatly inspired by Rao, Ellis sought to implement odd meters in a Western improvised context and (with Rao) co-authored the 1965 article "An Introduction to Indian Music for the Jazz Musician". Ellis briefly formed the first version of his big band at this time but disbanded it when he received a Rockefeller Grant to work at SUNY Buffalo for a year.

While in New York, Ellis was involved with several Third Stream projects. A live performance from February 8, 1964, at the Lincoln Center was filmed for Leonard Bernstein's Young People's Concerts series. He performed with other jazz musicians alongside the New York Philharmonic on Larry Austin's "Improvisations for Orchestra and Jazz Soloists" (1961) and Gunther Schuller's "Journey Into Jazz" (1962). A later recording of Austin's piece, featuring Ellis, bassist Barre Phillips, drummer Joe Cocuzzo, and the New York Philharmonic (directed by Bernstein) was released on an album entitled Leonard Bernstein Conducts Music Of Our Time (1965).

In November 1967, Ellis's first symphony, "Contrasts for Two Orchestras and Trumpet", was debuted by the Los Angeles Philharmonic Orchestra under Zubin Mehta.

== The Hindustani Jazz Sextet ==
Returning to the West Coast, Ellis formed The Hindustani Jazz Sextet, which explored some of the concepts he had learned at UCLA. The Sextet is generally considered to be the first band of its kind in America. The Sextet centered on Ellis and his mentor Harihar Rao, who played sitar and tabla, but also featured vibraphonist Emil Richards, drummer Steve Bohannon, bassists Chuck Domanico and Ray Neapolitan, and pianist Dave Mackay. At least one performance also featured saxophonist Gabe Baltazar. The band performed mainly original compositions which had titles like "Sweet Nineteen", "Turks Works", and "Bombay Bossa Nova".

The Sextet became somewhat well known around Los Angeles, despite having no recordings commercially available. Perhaps the greatest exposure the group had was "Synthesis", a composition by Ellis in which the Sextet performed alongside Stan Kenton's Neophonic Orchestra. The concert took place in February 1966 at the Los Angeles Music Center.

On July 14 of that year, the Sextet performed at Bill Graham's Fillmore Auditorium, opening for the Grateful Dead and Big Brother and the Holding Company.

== Don Ellis Orchestra ==
In addition to working with the Hindustani Jazz Sextet, Ellis continued writing arrangements for and rehearsing what would grow into the Don Ellis Orchestra. This rehearsal/workshop band played every Monday night for almost a year, first at a venue called Club Havana (club) and later relocating to a club called Bonesville in Hollywood, where they began to gain a significant following. The group started making money by charging a small admission fee to the rehearsals, and began a letter-writing campaign to get the band a spot at the 1966 Monterey Jazz Festival. The campaign eventually succeeded, and the band was scheduled to perform that September.

The Don Ellis Orchestra was different from most other big bands in several ways; most obviously in its instrumentation (discussed below), but also in Ellis's incorporation of Indian musical elements into modern big-band writing. Drawing from his compositional and arranging experience, as well as from his studies of Indian music, Ellis began to write jazz-based music with the time signatures he had studied with Rao. These included not only5/4,7/8, and9/4, but also more complex rhythmic cycles like 19/8 and 27/16. In the future, Ellis would use many more complex meters, as well as complex subdivisions of more standard meters. Many of these more complex cycles were inspired by Ellis's later interest in Eastern European folk music, such as that of Greece and Bulgaria.

Ellis also had a customized trumpet made for him by the Holton company, which he received in September 1965. Its additional (fourth) valve enabled it to produce quarter tones. Some claim that this might have been inspired by his studies of Indian music, as it contains bent pitches that some ethnomusicologists refer to as "microtones". However, it was probably more the result of Ellis's previous involvement with avant-garde classical music, in which many composers were experimenting with Western tonality and intervals, especially Harry Partch, with whom Ellis is known to have met and discussed ideas.

All of these unusual elements combined to create a musical experience unlike anything the Monterey audience had ever seen. The Orchestra received thunderous applause and a standing ovation at the conclusion of their first tune, titled "33 222 1 222" in accordance with its subdivision of 19. The band went on to play tunes in 7, 9, and 27, as well as a couple in more standard meters. Portions of the concert were released on Pacific Jazz the following year. The 1998 CD reissue includes several other tunes from the concert; the CD's notes also reveal that one number, "Concerto for Trumpet", was actually recorded a month later at a "Pacific Jazz Festival" in Costa Mesa. (The Monterey performance of that tune was apparently not up to the standards of Ellis and the album's producer, Richard Bock.)

Following this successful breakthrough performance, the band performed at the Pacific Jazz Festival in October 1966, and at Shelly's Manne Hole in March 1967, releasing segments of each on 1967's Live in 3 2/3/4 Time (Pacific Jazz).

== Columbia Records ==
Around this time, Columbia Records producer and A&R man John Hammond sought to recruit the band for the label. The band was signed, and was in the studio in September 1967 to record Electric Bath, which was released the following year to wide acclaim, was nominated for a Grammy award, won the 1968 Down Beat "Album of the Year" award, reaching No. 8 on the Billboard jazz charts. The song "Indian Lady" became one of the band's most popular tunes. "Open Beauty" featured Ellis in an echoplex trumpet solo, an innovative combination of acoustic instruments and electronic technology. Ellis would continue to develop the "electrophonic trumpet" over the next five years (see below).

In February 1968 the Don Ellis Orchestra was back in the studio to record a second album, which would become Shock Treatment. However, miscommunications arose, and the album was released with poor edits and inferior alternate takes that Ellis did not approve of. In Ellis's own words:

"Upon completion of the album, I did the mixing and editing here in California and then sent the finished product to New York. It wasn't until the album was already released that I heard a pressing. Much to my horror, I found that, without consulting me, the whole album had been changed around--rejected masters and unapproved takes were used (not the ones which I had selected and edited), the wrong tunes were on the album, unauthorized splices were made which disturbed the musical flow of some of the compositions (beats were even missing from bars), whole sections were cut out, some of these being the high points of the album. Therefore the liner notes, which were done to the original album, do not agree with what is actually on the album, calling attention to solos and high spots which are not there. [...] Also, the wrong personnel is listed on the jacket.

When I discovered what had happened, I was, naturally, disturbed and asked Columbia to redo the album. They graciously consented and I was able to change the album back to its original form except that I left Mercy Maybe Mercy, which my producer particularly liked, in place of Zim, which I hope will appear in a future album."

Throughout late 1968, the Orchestra returned to the studio several times to record songs for what would become Autumn. The album contained the twenty-minute opus "Variations for Trumpet" that showcased Ellis's virtuosic trumpet playing. Also on the record was "Pussy Wiggle Stomp", the song that would succeed "Indian Lady" as the Orchestra's signature tune. Side two of the record contained two lengthy tunes from a concert at Stanford University from August 1968. The tracks are notable for their revelations of the Ellis band's contemporary live sound, which was far more raucous than either of their previous live recordings.

In early 1969, the Orchestra was back in Columbia Studios to record The New Don Ellis Band Goes Underground, a collection of several pop songs (arranged by Ellis) and some Ellis originals. The album features vocalist Patti Allen on songs by Laura Nyro, The Isley Brothers, and Sly Stone; it also includes "Bulgarian Bulge", a composition based on a Bulgarian folk tune in 33/16 time.

The band's energetic live performances such as the one at Stanford caused its popularity among college crowds to increase. In June 1970, the Orchestra performed for three nights at Bill Graham's Fillmore West auditorium, opening for the Quicksilver Messenger Service and Leon Russell. The resulting recording was made into a double LP and released by Columbia in late 1970. "Live at Fillmore" was a happy return to original material, and even included one Beatles cover, a highly experimental rendition of "Hey Jude", as well as another version of "Pussy Wiggle Stomp".

Around this time, Ellis's popularity among educators was also climbing; copies of his band's charts were being published and played by many high school and college big bands. Accordingly, Ellis taught many clinics and played with many school bands.

In May 1971, Ellis added a string quartet to the Orchestra. He also hired Bulgarian piano virtuoso Milcho Leviev who was able to improvise fluently in time signatures that would initially be intimidating to most American improvisers. He was an important asset to Ellis's band, and stayed with Ellis for five years. The Orchestra was recorded in late May at Basin Street West in San Francisco. The resulting album, Tears of Joy, was another live double-LP and was released in late 1971. The Exotic Rhythms of Don Ellis (May 2002), a dissertation submitted to The Peabody Institute of the Johns Hopkins University in partial fulfillment of the requirements for the degree of Doctor of Musical Arts. The album featured a composition called "Strawberry Soup" that has been the subject of several doctoral dissertations due to its metric intricacy, its simple theme and complex variations, and the sheer timbral spectrum that it covers.

== The French Connection ==
Around this time, Ellis was approached by film director William Friedkin to compose the music to his film The French Connection. Ellis accepted the project and wrote the music to be performed by his own Orchestra. Ellis later won a Grammy for this project ("Best Instrumental Arrangement"), and was asked to write the music to the film's sequel, French Connection II in 1975.

Ellis's final album for Columbia, Connection, was recorded in August 1972. The album featured "The Theme from 'The French Connection'", an abbreviated version of Ellis's movie score, and "Chain Reaction", a 13/8 tour de force by longtime contributor Hank Levy. Alongside these highlights are arrangements of several pop songs by artists such as Carole King, Yes, Andrew Lloyd Webber, and The Carpenters. The arrangements were generally tongue in cheek; often Ellis arranged them in different meters than the original, or arranged for the melody to be played in a humorous way. There is no singer on this album.

Regardless of what inspired Ellis's liberal interpretations of the popular material, Connection was the Orchestra's last album for Columbia.

== MPS Records ==
In 1973, the Orchestra recorded Soaring, a collection of originals. Milcho Leviev contributed "Sladka Pitka", based on a Bulgarian folk song. A Hank Levy tune off the album, "Whiplash", was later featured in a film of the same name. The record was released by MPS Records, which would also release Ellis's next album, Haiku. The record, featuring Milcho Leviev, bassist Ray Brown, drummer John Guerin, and a large string orchestra, is made up of ten songs, each based on a Japanese haiku poem. The album is relaxed and introspective. Haiku was presumably recorded in late 1973 and released in 1974.

=== Mid-1970s: The Organic Band and heart problems ===
In 1974, Ellis became interested in the music of Brazil, even studying Portuguese so as to better communicate with indigenous musicians. He led a live band around this time called the Organic Band, which was a stripped-down version of the Orchestra that had no electronic instrumentation or modification (save for amplification). The band also featured a vocal quartet.

These pursuits were postponed when Ellis started having health problems, feeling "out of breath after [walking] up a single flight of stairs". He checked himself into a hospital in New York City where a doctor diagnosed him with mitral stenosis, a condition which caused his heart to beat in odd rhythms. He was prescribed medication and went home to Los Angeles. Shortly thereafter, he started feeling strange again, and went to a local hospital where he was re-diagnosed with an atrial septal defect. More tests were run and finally a third diagnosis was made: cardiomyopathy. Ellis was prescribed more drugs, but his condition worsened and he went into ventricular fibrillation early one morning in May 1975. Ellis later described being on the verge of death, as doctors struggled to save his life: "It sounds weird, I know, but it was a remarkably beautiful experience, maybe the ultimate high."

=== Late career ===
By 1976, Ellis was back in action, although these activities are little documented. On December 3, 1976, the Don Ellis Orchestra performed on a Shirley MacLaine television special entitled Where Do We Go From Here? The Orchestra played Ellis's arrangement of "Sweet Georgia Brown" retitled "Sweet Shirley MacLaine". The arrangement featured a solo by Art Pepper, a chorus of tap dancers, and the return of the electrophonic trumpet.

In 1977, Ellis was signed to Atlantic Records, which promised to fund the Orchestra's upcoming trip for the band's performance at the Montreux Jazz Festival in Montreux, Switzerland in exchange for a live recording of said performance. However, the record company asked Ellis to first record arrangements of two songs from Star Wars. The songs "Star Wars (Main Title)" and "Princess Leia's Theme" were to be released as a 45 rpm single. In June, the record company scrambled and asked Ellis to record an entire album of material, for the purpose of having an album to sell in case the single became a hit. He had to do this before his band left to perform in Montreux in about a week. In addition, the songs that were to be on this album could not be duplicates of what would later appear on the live album.

Ellis got some help from fellow composers/arrangers Tommy Vig and Curt Berg but largely wrote everything on his own. The album was thrown together and released as Music from Other Galaxies and Planets; all the songs were retitled with novelty space-related names such as "Orion's Sword" and "Crypton".

The band's performance at Montreux was well received, and the subsequent album reached No. 48 on the Billboard jazz charts. This was to be Ellis's last album as a leader, although he would appear on albums by Nick Gilder (You Know Who You Are) and Tommy Vig (1978).

=== Death ===
Ellis's last known public performance took place on April 21, 1978, at the Westside Room in Century City. After this, his doctor ordered him to refrain from touring and playing trumpet because it was too stressful on his heart. On December 17, 1978, after seeing a Jon Hendricks concert, Ellis suffered a fatal heart attack at his North Hollywood home where his parents were staying with him. His heart condition is believed to have been cardiac arrhythmia. He was 44. Ellis was buried in the Sheltering Hills section of Forest Lawn Memorial Park, in Hollywood Hills, California.

== Legacy ==
Ellis had a strong influence on those with whom he worked. Former sideman Stu Blumberg credited Ellis for preparing him for the idiosyncrasies of unconventional music in film soundtracks. Tenor saxophonist Jim Snodgrass remarked, "I think in many ways Don was a teacher. One thing his music taught me was that I could play anything I absolutely had to." Sidemen like Tom Scott, John Klemmer, Glenn Ferris, Milcho Leviev and a few others have gone on to prolific solo careers. Others like Ralph Humphrey and Fred Selden have had successful careers as sidemen, session musicians or educators. Ellis was an ardent libertarian. This arose from his open-mindedness towards the music of other cultures, according to some of his students.

Most of Ellis's albums have been reissued on CD. Columbia Records, responsible for originally releasing seven of Ellis's albums, only reissued Electric Bath (Ellis's biggest seller) in 1997; the rest have been leased to other companies for reissue. Today, thanks to labels like Koch Jazz, Wounded Bird and Mighty Quinn Productions, almost all of his albums have been reissued on CD and are readily available. The Sleepy Night record company in the UK has recently released a number of CDs of live performances from Don Ellis' private collection.

Ellis also wrote numerous articles and several books. The New Rhythm Book (1972) presents methods of practice and performance in unusual meters and features a companion play-along LP/cassette entitled New Rhythms. His second book, Quarter Tones, published in 1975, is a theoretical guide to using quarter tones. Both books are thorough, providing a great deal of historical and cultural background to their subjects. Quarter Tones also provides readers with etudes and exercises. Both books are hard to find, as they have presumably not been printed since their first editions.

The Don Ellis Library and Collection resides in the Ethnomusicology Archives at UCLA. Prior to that, (from 1981 to 2000) it was housed at Eastfield College, part of Dallas County Community College District, DCCCD in Mesquite, Texas. Along with writings, instruments and other items, is his Grammy for best score for the movie The French Connection in 1971.

== Orchestra instrumentation ==
Ellis's interest in expanding the possibilities within big band instrumentation is obvious on even his first Orchestra release, 1966's Live at Monterey. Inspired by his experiences with Latin bands, Ellis expanded his rhythm section to two drum sets, three double-basses, at least two auxiliary percussionists, piano, and organ. On the song "Turkish Bath" from Electric Bath (1967), bassist Ray Neapolitan doubles on sitar. His horn sections were often fairly typical, although he later added a tuba and French horn to augment the brass section, and sometimes had the saxophonists double on instruments like flute, oboe, clarinet and saxello.

In 1967, Ellis began experimentation with electronics. His pianist started using the Fender-Rhodes electric piano, clavinet, and electric harpsichord. Ellis himself started using what he called the "electrophonic trumpet"; that is, a trumpet whose sound was amplified and often routed through various effects processors. The first appearance of this innovation is on "Open Beauty" from 1967's Electric Bath, in which Ellis takes an extended solo with his trumpet being processed through an echoplex. Ellis also used the ring modulator on several occasions, which was built for him by Tom Oberheim.

In 1968, Ellis replaced his double bassists with a single electric bassist, at first Joe Julian, then Dennis F. Parker, and finally Dave McDaniel. He also hired guitarist Jay Graydon who remained with the band for several years.

In 1971, for the Tears of Joy tour, Ellis added a string quartet to his band. The instruments were amplified using newly developed pick-ups made by Barcus-Berry so that they could be heard over the brass and saxophones. These new timbres offered Ellis a wellspring of creative possibilities. As he explained, "People spend whole evenings listening to a brass quintet, a woodwind or string quartet, so I reasoned that having ALL of these in the context of a big band should give us a fantastic variety of colors from which to draw."

The 1974 album Haiku was recorded using a jazz quartet with full string orchestra backing. Due to the size of the group, this was probably never intended to be a replacement for the Don Ellis Orchestra as a touring group.

Ellis's "Organic Band", which toured throughout spring and summer 1974, reduced the band's numbers from 21 or 22 to 15. The horn section was more than halved, the string quartet was removed, a vocal quartet was added, and no electronics (save for amplification) were used to alter the band's sound.

After his heart attack, Ellis returned briefly to the electrophonic trumpet, and continued using synthesizers and electronic keyboards. The string quartet, a mainstay since 1971, remained alongside the brass. He also began playing two new instruments, the superbone and the firebird, which were a combination valve-slide trombone and trumpet, respectively. Both were also played by Maynard Ferguson.

== Discography ==
Year	Album	Recording	Label	Notes
1960	New Sounds for the '60s	Studio	Enrica	Unreleased (label bankruptcy)
1960	...How Time Passes...	Studio	1960, Candid	
1961	Out of Nowhere	Studio	1988, Candid	
1961	New Ideas	Studio	1961, New Jazz 1971, Prestige	
1962	Essence	Studio	1962, Pacific Jazz 2013, Fresh Sound	
1962	Jazz Jamboree 1962	Studio	1962, Polskie Nagrania Muza 2013, Polskie Radio	
1966	The Hindustani Jazz Sextet Live at UCLA	Live	2022, Sleepy Night	
1966	Don Ellis Orchestra 'Live' at Monterey!	Live	1967, Pacific Jazz	
1967	Live in 3 2/3/4 Time	Live	1967, Pacific Jazz	
1967	Pieces of Eight. Live at UCLA	Live	2006, Wounded Bird	
1967	Electric Bath	Studio	1967, Columbia	
1967	Contrasts for Two Orchestras and Trumpet	Live		Unreleased Conducted by Zubin Mehta
1968	Shock Treatment	Studio	1968, Columbia 2001, Koch	
1968	Live in Europe 1968	Live	2022, Sleepy Night	
1968	Autumn	Studio	1968, Columbia 2007, Wounded Bird	
1969	The New Don Ellis Band Goes Underground	Studio	1969, Columbia 2006, Wounded Bird	
1969	Moon Zero Two	Soundtrack	1998, GDI	1 track released in The Hammer Film Music Collection, Vol. 1
1970	Don Ellis at Fillmore	Live	1970, Columbia 2005, Wounded Bird	
1970	Basin Street 1970	Live	2023, Sleepy Night	
1971	Tears of Joy	Live	1971, Columbia 2005, Wounded Bird	
1971	The French Connection	Soundtrack	2001, Film Score Monthly 2016, La La Land	
1972	Walla Walla	Live	2024, Sleepy Night	
1972	Connection	Studio	1972, Columbia 2005, Wounded Bird	
1972	Kansas City Bomber	Soundtrack		Unreleased
1972	New Rhythms	Studio	1972, EME	Released with The New Rhythm Book
1973	Soaring	Studio	1973, MPS	
1973	Haiku	Studio	1973, MPS	
1973	The Seven-Ups	Soundtrack	2007, Intrada	
1975	French Connection II	Soundtrack	2001, Film Score Monthly 2016, La La Land	
1975	The Deadly Tower	Soundtrack	2010, Film Score Monthly	Released in TV Omnibus, Vol. 1 (1962–1976)
1977	Music from Other Galaxies and Planets	Studio	1977, Atlantic 2006, Wounded Bird	
1977	Ruby	Soundtrack		Unreleased
1977	The Ransom	Soundtrack		Unreleased
1977	Live at Montreux	Live	1978, Atlantic 2002, Koch	
1977	Live 1977	Live	2025, Sleepy Night	
1978	Natural Enemies	Soundtrack		Unreleased
1978	Live in India (The Lost Tapes, Vol. 1)	Live	2010, Sleepy Night	
1978	The Lost Tapes, Vol. 2	Studio	2018, Sleepy Night	
1978	The Lost Tapes, Vol. 3	Studio	2021, Sleepy Night	
	Electric Heart	Documentary	2007, Sights & Sounds	

=== As sideman ===
With Maynard Ferguson

- Maynard Ferguson Plays Jazz for Dancing (Roulette, 1959)
- Newport Suite (Roulette, 1960)
- Maynard '64 (Roulette, 1963)

With George Russell

- George Russell Sextet in K.C. (Decca, 1961)
- The Stratus Seekers (Riverside, 1961)
- Ezz-thetics (Riverside, 1961)
- The Outer View (Riverside, 1962)

With others

- Charles Mingus, Mingus Dynasty (Columbia, 1959)
- Frank Zappa, Absolutely Free (Verve, 1967) – trumpet on "Brown Shoes Don't Make It"

== Bibliography ==
- The New Rhythm Book (Ellis Music Enterprises, 1972)
- Quarter tones: A Text with Musical Examples, Exercises and Etudes (Harold Branch Publishing, Inc., 1975)
- Rhythm: A New System of Rhythm Based on the Ancient Hindu Techniques. [unpublished] (Objective Music Company, Inc., 1977)

== Collaborators ==
(this is an incomplete list)

- Ed Shaughnessy
- Ralph Humphrey (drummer)
- David Garibaldi (musician)
