= Autumn (Don Ellis album) =

Studio album by Don Ellis Orchestra
- Released: 1968
- Recorded: August 1968
- Genre: Jazz
- Length: 57:49
- Label: Columbia; CS 9721
- Producer: Al Kooper

Don Ellis chronology
Shock Treatment (1968)	Autumn (1968)	The New Don Ellis Band Goes Underground (1969)

Autumn is an album by trumpeter Don Ellis recorded in 1968 and released on the Columbia label.

== Reception ==
Professional ratings
Review scores
Source	Rating
Allmusic	5/5 stars
Rolling Stone	(neutral)
The Rolling Stone Jazz Record Guide	4/5 stars

Scott Yanow of Allmusic stated, the "Don Ellis' Orchestra is heard at the peak of its powers on this Columbia LP... This is a classic release".

== Track listing ==
All compositions by Don Ellis except as indicated

1. "Variations for Trumpet" - 19:25
2. "Scratt and Fluggs" - 2:00
3. "Pussy Wiggle Stomp" - 6:43
4. "K.C. Blues" [live] (Charlie Parker) - 8:46
5. "Child of Ecstasy" - 3:16
6. "Indian Lady" [live] - 17:39

== Personnel ==
- Don Ellis - trumpet, arranger
- Glenn Stuart, Stu Blumberg, John Rosenberg, Bob Harmon - trumpet
- Ernie Carlson, Glenn Ferris - trombone
- Don Switzer, Terry Woodson - bass trombone
- Doug Bixby, Roger Bobo - tuba
- Ira Schulman - alto saxophone
- Frank Strozier - alto saxophone, clarinet
- Ron Starr - alto saxophone, flute, piccolo flute, soprano saxophone, clarinet
- Sam Falzone - tenor saxophone, soprano saxophone, flute, clarinet
- John Klemmer - tenor saxophone, clarinet
- John Magruder - baritone saxophone, clarinet, bass clarinet
- Pete Robinson - piano, clavinet, electric piano, prepared piano
- Mike Lang - piano, clavinet, electric piano
- Ray Neapolitan, Dave Parlato - bass
- Ralph Humphrey - drums
- Gene Strimling - drums, percussion
- Lee Pastora - congas
- Mark Stevens - vibraphone, percussion
