= Tears of Joy (album) =

Live album by Don Ellis
- Released: 1971
- Recorded: May 20–23, 1971 at Basin Street West in San Francisco
- Genre: Jazz
- Length: 81:19
- Label: Columbia; G 30927
- Producer: Phil Macy

Don Ellis chronology
Don Ellis at Fillmore (1970)	Tears of Joy (1971)	Connection (1972)

Tears of Joy is a live double album by trumpeter/bandleader Don Ellis recorded in 1971 and released on the Columbia label.

== Reception ==
Professional ratings
Review scores
Source	Rating
Allmusic	4.5/5 stars
All About Jazz	4/5 stars
The Penguin Guide to Jazz	4/4 stars
The Rolling Stone Jazz Record Guide	4/5 stars

Thom Jurek of Allmusic said "Tears of Joy is a Don Ellis classic. The sheer musical strength of this ensemble is pretty much unparalleled in his career. The trumpeter/leader had backed off—a bit—from some of his outlandish and beautifully excessive use of strange and unconventional time signatures, though there is no lack of pioneering experimentalism in tone, color, arrangement, or style. ...Ultimately, Tears of Joy stands as a singular achievement in a career full of them by a musical auteur whose creativity seemingly knew few if any bounds". On All About Jazz, Jim Santella observed "Tears of Joy marked a subtle change in the Don Ellis big band. The trumpeter was gradually drifting toward popular music, and he was beginning to use the new electronic technology to its best advantage. However, he continued to load each arrangement with the kinds of musical features that have always left their unique stamp on his undertakings. Ellis and his other soloists stretch out with virtuosity while complex rhythms and dense counterpoint fill the air, and the band's sections taunt each other with adventurous forays. ...Highly recommended, Tears of Joy represents vintage Don Ellis big band excitement at its best" The Penguin Guide to Jazz said "Tears of Joy is regarded by some as the best Don Ellis album. It's certainly bold and expansive".

== Track listing ==
All compositions by Don Ellis except as indicated

Side One:

1. "Tears of Joy" - 2:58
2. "5/4 Getaway" - 7:49
3. "Bulgarian Bulge" - 4:54
4. "Get It Together" (Sam Falzone) - 5:14

Side Two:

1. "Quiet Longing" - 3:48
2. "Blues in Elf" - 6:41
3. "Loss" - 8:21

Side Three:

1. "How's This for Openers?" - 8:37
2. "Samba Bajada" (Hank Levy) - 11:31

Side Four:

1. "Strawberry Soup" - 17:36
2. "Euphoric Acid" (Fred Selden) - 4:25

== Personnel ==
- Don Ellis – trumpet, flugelhorn, drums, arranger
- Lonnie Shetter – alto saxophone, woodwinds
- Fred Selden – alto saxophone, flute, soprano saxophone, piccolo, alto flute, arranger
- Sam Falzone – tenor saxophone, clarinet, flute, arranger
- Jon Clarke – baritone saxophone, woodwinds
- Paul Bogosian, Jack Caudill, Bruce Mackay – trumpet
- Kenneth Nelson – French Horn
- Jim Sawyers – trombone
- Ken Sawhill – bass trombone
- Doug Bixby – contrabass trombone, tuba
- Milcho Leviev – piano, pianet, clavinet
- Dennis F. Parker – bass
- Ralph Humphrey, Ron Dunn – drums
- Lee Pastora – congas
- Earle Corry, Alfredo Ebat – violin
- Ellen Smith – viola
- Christine Ermacoff – cello
- Hank Levy – arranger
