= The New Don Ellis Band Goes Underground =

Studio album by Don Ellis
- Released: 1969
- Recorded: 1969
- Genre: Jazz fusion; jazz-funk; avant-jazz; boogie rock
- Length: 43:01
- Label: Columbia; CS 9889
- Producer: Don Ellis and Al Kooper

Don Ellis chronology
| Autumn (1968) | The New Don Ellis Band Goes Underground (1969) | Don Ellis at Fillmore (1970) |

The New Don Ellis Band Goes Underground is an album by trumpeter/bandleader Don Ellis recorded in 1969 and released on the Columbia label.

== Reception ==
Professional ratings
Review scores
| Source | Rating |
|---|---|
| AllMusic | 2/5 stars |
| The Rolling Stone Jazz Record Guide | 3/5 stars |
| The Penguin Guide to Jazz Recordings | 2.5/4 stars |

Scott Yanow of Allmusic says the album is "one of trumpeter Don Ellis' lesser efforts". On All About Jazz, Jim Santella said "this big band album from Don Ellis proved inspirational. It gave a contemporary quality to big band music – the kind of force that influenced college and university stage bands around the world. Vocals were added, and Ellis emphasized a smooth, pop quality to his arrangements. Melodies were easy to follow, and the songs caught all the emotion that he pumped in so generously. Nevertheless, the album contains the same kind of musical virtuosity that Ellis had demonstrated on earlier albums".

== Track listing ==
All compositions by Don Ellis except as indicated

1. "House in the Country" (Al Kooper) – 2:48
2. "Don't Leave Me" (Harry Nilsson) – 3:40
3. "Higher" (Sly Stone) – 3:19
4. "Bulgarian Bulge" (Traditional) – 3:03
5. "Eli's Comin'" (Laura Nyro) – 4:08
6. "Acoustical Lass" – 2:32
7. "Good Feelin'" – 6:14
8. "Send My Baby Back" (Lonnie Hewitt, Ernest Marbray) – 3:02
9. "Love for Rent" (Fred Selden) – 4:06
10. "It's Your Thing" (Ronald Isley, O'Kelly Isley, Jr., Rudolph Isley) – 2:54
11. "Ferris Wheel" – 3:46
12. "Black Baby" (Don Ellis, Patti Allen) – 3:29

== Personnel ==
- Don Ellis – trumpet, flugelhorn, arranger
- Patti Allen – vocals
- John Klemmer, Hadley Caliman – tenor saxophone, flute
- Mike Altschul – clarinet, flute, baritone saxophone
- Fred Seldon – clarinet, flute, alto saxophone, soprano saxophone
- Lonnie Shetter – clarinet, flute, oboe, alto saxophone, soprano saxophone
- Sam Falzone – clarinet, flute, tenor saxophone
- Doug Bixby – tuba
- Stuart Blumberg, John Rosenberg, Glenn Stuart, Jack Coan – trumpet, flugelhorn
- Jock Ellis, Glenn Ferris – trombone
- Dana Hughes – bass trombone
- Jay Graydon – guitar
- Peter Robinson – piano, electric piano
- Jo Julian, Carol Kaye – bass
- Ralph Humphrey, Rick Quintinal – percussion, drums, vibraphone
- Lee Pastora – percussion, bongos, congas
