= Tokow Boys =

French new wave group

- Origin: Paris, France
- Genres: New wave
- Years active: 1979–1983
- Label: Virgin
- Past members: Rachel Ortas; Eric Tabuchi; Daniel Brunetti; Franz Weisgerber; Luigi Morello

Tokow Boys was a French new wave group that was formed in 1979.

== History ==
The group was formed in 1979 with Rachel Ortas on vocals, Eric Tabuchi on bass and keyboards, Daniel Brunetti on saxophone, Franz Weisgerber on guitar and Luigi Morello on drums. They signed with Virgin Records and released the singles "Swinging Pool", "Elle Hôtesse" and then the album Cobra! Cobra! in 1981. They were an opening act for Orchestral Manoeuvres in the Dark on their 1981 French tour. The group appeared in the 1983 film Faux Fuyants, directed by Jean-Pierre Limosin and Alain Bergala.

In 1984, Rachel Ortas and Eric Tabuchi formed the group Luna Parker, who had a major hit in France with Tes états d'âme Éric in 1986. Rachel is now an illustrator and artist in residence at Saint Martin's School of Art and is the co-creator of OKIDO magazine. Eric is a photographer. Franz Weisgerber went on to become an actor under the name of Walter Shnorkell.

== Discography ==
Albums

- Cobra! Cobra! (1981)

Singles

- "Petite Rockette/Swinging Pool" (1980)
- "Elle Hôtesse" (1980)
- "Class Touriste/Cobra! Cobra!" (1981)

Various artists compilation albums

- Des Jeunes Gens Mödernes: Post Punk, Cold Wave and Culture Növö en France, 1978-1983 (2012)
- Des Jeunes Gens Mödernes: Post Punk, Cold Wave and Culture Növö en France, 1978-1983 Volume 3 (2020)
