= Don Ellis at Fillmore =

Live album by Don Ellis
- Released: 1970
- Recorded: Fillmore West, June, 1970; San Francisco, CA
- Genre: Big band
- Length: 86:37
- Label: Columbia

Don Ellis chronology
The New Don Ellis Band Goes Underground (1969)	Don Ellis at Fillmore (1970)	Tears of Joy (1971)

Don Ellis at Fillmore is a live double-LP by big band leader Don Ellis which was released in 1970.

== Reception ==
Professional ratings
Review scores
Source	Rating
Allmusic	4.5/5 stars
All About Jazz	5/5 stars
The Rolling Stone Jazz Record Guide	2/5 stars

Al Campbell of Allmusic said "This is a crazy and consistently riotous two-disc set that features the Don Ellis Orchestra at its height". On All About Jazz, Jim Santella observed "Don Ellis takes you off on a whirlwind ride, using electronic trumpet, complex meters, superb big band arrangements, and a cast of experienced sidemen who blow the walls down"

== Track listing ==
=== Side A ===
1. "Final Analysis" (Don Ellis) – 13:59
2. "Excursion #2" (John Klemmer) – 5:44
3. "The Magic Bus Ate My Doughnut" (Fred Selden) – 2:29

=== Side B ===
1. "The Blues" (Ellis) – 7:25
2. "Salvatore Sam" (Ellis) – 5:06
3. "Rock Odyssey" (Hank Levy) – 9:48

=== Side C ===
1. "Hey Jude" (Lennon–McCartney) – 10:38
2. "Antea" (Levy) – 5:59
3. "Old Man's Tear" (Klemmer) – 4:53

=== Side D ===
1. "Great Divide" (Ellis) – 8:42
2. "Pussy Wiggle Stomp" (Ellis) – 11:54

== Personnel ==
- Don Ellis - trumpet, drums
- John Klemmer - tenor saxophone
- Jay Graydon - guitar
- John Rosenberg, Stuart Blumberg, Glenn Stuart, Jack Coan - trumpets
- Ernie Carlson, Glenn Ferris - trombone
- Don Switzer - bass trombone
- Lonnie Shetter, Fred Selden, Jon Clarke, Sam Falzone - woodwinds
- Doug Bixby - contrabass trombone, tuba
- Tom Garvin - piano
- Dennis F. Parker - bass
- Ralph Humphrey - drums
- Ron Dunn - drums
- Lee Pastora - congas
