= Glenn Ferris =

American jazz trombonist

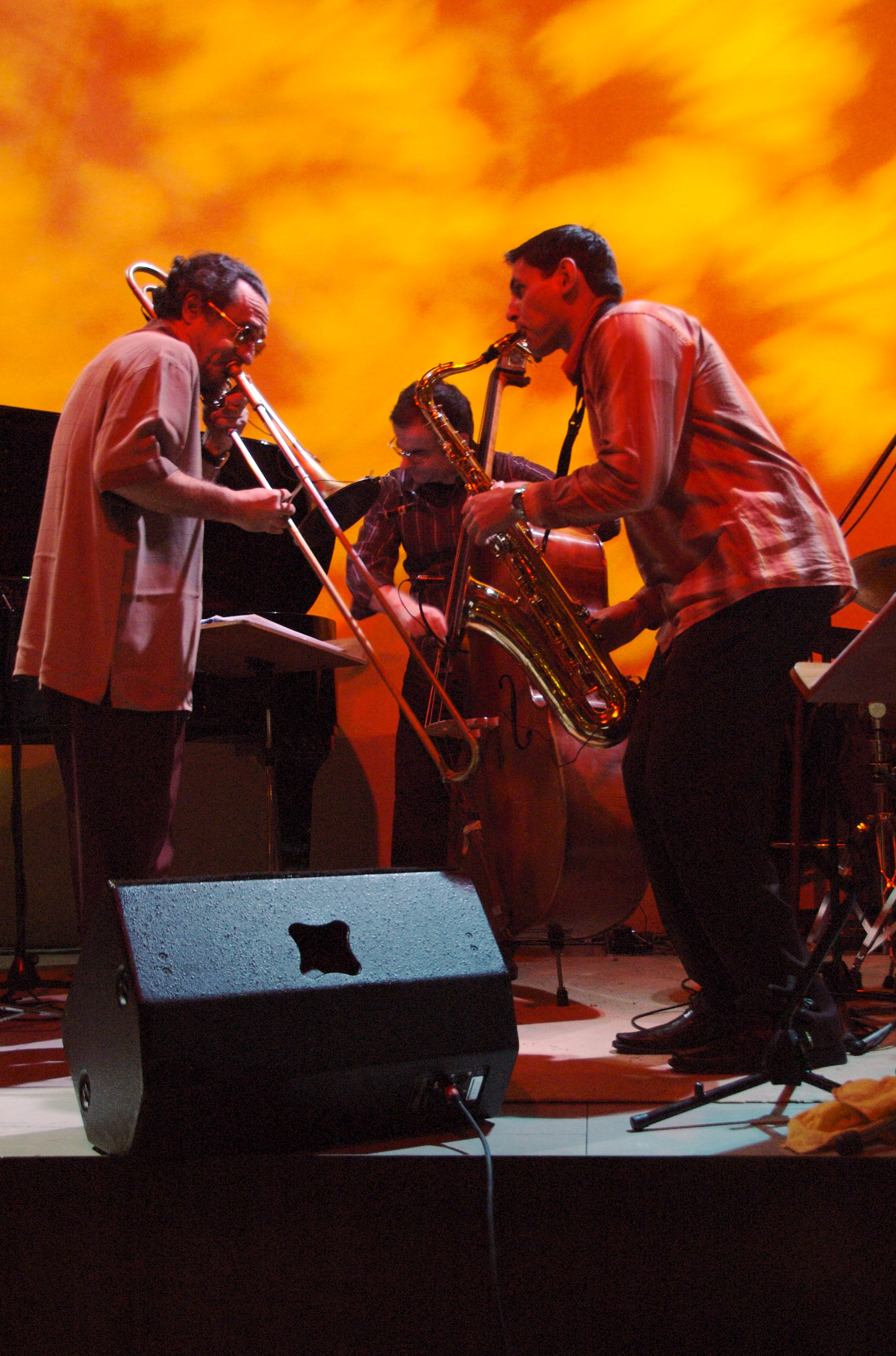
- Glenn Ferris, left

Background information
- Born: Glenn Arthur Ferris; June 27, 1950 (age 76); Los Angeles, California, U.S.
- Genres: Jazz, rock, pop
- Occupation: Musician
- Instrument: Trombone

Glenn Arthur Ferris (born June 27, 1950) is an American jazz trombonist who has also worked in other fields. Outside of jazz he has played for Frank Zappa, Stevie Wonder, James Taylor, and Duran Duran.

He studied classical music from 1958 to 1967, but from 1964 onward he also studied jazz with Don Ellis, performing all of the trombone solos on three albums ("Ferris Wheel" was written for him by Don Ellis). He went on to perform with a variety of American musicians in several genres before moving to France in 1980. In France he worked with Tony Scott, Brotherhood of Breath, and Henri Texier. He has led a trio and a quintet and has taught at the Conservatoire de Paris.

== Discography ==
=== As leader ===
- A Live in Paris with Collectif Planete Carree (RCA Victor, 1980)
- Flesh and Stone (Enja, 1994)
- Palatino with Romano/Benito/Fresu (Label Bleu, 1995)
- Face Lift (Enja, 1996)
- Refugees (Enja, 1997)
- Chrominance (Enja, 2001)
- Here and Now with BFG (Naïve, 2001)
- Air with Mirabassi/Boltro (Sketch, 2003)
- Skin Me! (Naive, 2004)
- X Actimo! (Naive, 2006)
- Ferris Wheel (Enja, 2009)
- Live in L.A. with Bobby Bradford (Clean Feed, 2011)
- Now or Never with BFG (Naive, 2013)
- The Glenn Ferris Italian Quintet – “Animal Love”(Soundscapes Media Group, Double LP release 2020)
- The Glenn Ferris Italian Quintet – "Soul Beautiful" (Soundscapes Media Group, 2026)

With Palatino

- Tempo (Label Bleu, 1998)
- Palatino Chap. 3 (EmArcy, 2001)
- Back in Town (Naive, 2011)

=== As sideman ===
With Billy Cobham

- Total Eclipse (Atlantic, 1974)
- Shabazz (Atlantic, 1975)
- A Funky Thide of Sings (Atlantic, 1975)

With Don Ellis

- Autumn (Columbia, 1968)
- The New Don Ellis Band Goes Underground (Columbia, 1969)
- Don Ellis at Fillmore (Columbia, 1970)

With Steve Lacy

- Anthem (Novus, 1990)
- Itinerary (hat ART, 1991)
- Clangs (hat ART, 1993)

With Peter Schärli

- Tomorrow (Enja, 1992)
- Blues for the Beast (Enja, 1997)
- Guilty (Enja, 2001)
- Avo Session (TCB, 2011)
- Purge (Enja, 2015)

With Henri Texier

- An Indian's Week (Label Bleu, 1993)
- Mosaic Man (Label Bleu, 1998)
- Strings' Spirit (Label Bleu, 2002)

With Jack Walrath

- In Europe (SteepleChase, 1983)
- Jack Walrath Quintet at Umbria Jazz Festival, Vol. 1 (Red, 1985)
- Jack Walrath Quintet at Umbria Jazz Festival, Vol. 2 (Red, 1985)

With others

- Karen Alexander, Voyager (Asylum, 1978)
- Sophie Alour, Time for Love (Music from Source 2017)
- Barry Altschul, That's Nice (Soul Note, 1986)
- Atlantik, Songe Yo (Sonodisc, 1993)
- Average White Band, AWB (Atlantic, 1974)
- Stéphane Belmondo & Yusef Lateef, Influence (B.Flat, 2005)
- Tim Berne, The Five-Year Plan (Empire, 1979)
- The Brothers Johnson, Look Out for #1 (A&M, 1976)
- François Cotinaud and Enrico Rava, Pyramides (Label Musivi, 1992)
- Hughes de Courson, DecOdeX (Philips, 1996)
- Franco D'Andrea, Flavours (Penta Flowers 1992)
- Bill Deraime, Tout Recommencait (EastWest 1994)
- George Duke, Save the Country (Liberty, 1970)
- George Duke, From Me to You (Epic, 1977)
- Duran Duran, Big Thing (EMI, 1988)
- Jean-Luc Fillon, Echoes of Ellington (Cristal, 2006)
- Dave Frishberg, Where You at? (Bloomdido, 1991)
- Vinny Golia, Live at the Century City Playhouse Los Angeles 1979 (Dark Tree, 2017)
- Henri Guedon, Afro Blue (Le Chant du Monde, 1982)
- Henri Guedon, Afro Temple (Le Chant du Monde, 1984)
- Polo Hofer, Rutmus, Bluus + Schnalli Schue! (Schnoutz, 1988)
- Angelique Kidjo, Parakou (Island, 1989)
- Didier Levallet, Generations (Evidence, 1992)
- Franck Monnet, Les Embellies (Tot Ou Tard, 2000)
- Moni Bile, Bijou (Toure Jim's 1982)
- Alphonse Mouzon, Distant Lover (Highrise, 1982)
- Alphonse Mouzon, Back to Jazz (Optimism, 1988)
- Youssou N'Dour, The Guide (Columbia, 1994)
- Buell Neidlinger, Marty Krystall, Archie Shepp, Glenn Ferris, Marty's Garage (K2B2, 1983)
- James Newton, Flute Music (1977)
- Jay Oliver, Dance of the Robot People (Akono, 1982)
- Orchestre National de Jazz/Antoine Herve, O.N.J. 87 (Label Bleu, 1988)
- Roberto Ottaviano, Astrolabio (Dodicilune, 2015)
- Luna Parker, Le Challenge Des Espoirs (Barclay, 1987)
- Luna Parker, Felin Pour L'Autre (Barclay, 1988)
- Bonnie Raitt, Takin' My Time (Warner Bros., 1973)
- Dede Saint Prix, Kannel (New Deal, 1989)
- Dede Saint Prix, Leve Arrete Ton Delire (Sonodisc, 1991)
- Veronique Sanson, Allah (WEA, 1988)
- Veronique Sanson, Moi, Le Venin (WEA, 1988)
- Martial Solal, Big Band (CY, 1984)
- Tabou Combo, Tabou Combo Super Stars (Tabou Combo and Tapes 1979)
- Gianmaria Testa, Lampo (Le Chant du Monde, 2007)
- Francky Vincent, Manze Lola (Bleu Caraibes, 1988)
- Dennis Wilson, Pacific Ocean (Blue Caribou, 2008)
- Stevie Wonder, Songs in the Key of Life (Tamla, 1976)
