= Art Ellison (politician) =

American politician (1943–2024)

Member of the New Hampshire House of Representatives
- In office December 5, 2018 – March 23, 2024
- Succeeded by: Jim Snodgrass (elect)
- Constituency: Merrimack 27th (2018–2022); 28th (2022–2024)

Personal details
- Born: October 7, 1943
- Died: March 23, 2024 (aged 80) Concord, New Hampshire, U.S.
- Party: Democratic
- Education: Earlham College; Northwestern University; University of Massachusetts at Amherst

Arthur Ellison (October 7, 1943 – March 23, 2024) was an American politician in the state of New Hampshire.

== Education ==
Ellison earned a B.A. from Earlham College in 1965, an M.A.T. from Northwestern University, in 1966 and a Masters in Education from University of Massachusetts at Amherst in 1978.

== Political career ==
On November 6, 2018, Ellison was elected to the New Hampshire House of Representatives where he represented the Merrimack 27 district. Ellison assumed office on December 5, 2018. Ellison was a Democrat. Ellison endorsed Bernie Sanders in the 2020 Democratic Party presidential primaries.

== Personal life and death ==
Ellison resided in Concord, New Hampshire. Ellison was married to Susan Gladstone, who died in 1992; they had two children. He died on March 23, 2024, at the age of 80.
