= Milcho Leviev =

Bulgarian composer, arranger, and jazz pianist (1937–2019)

Milcho Leviev (Bulgarian: Милчо Левиев [ˈmiɫtʃo lɛˈviɛf]; December 19, 1937 – October 12, 2019) was a Bulgarian composer, arranger, and jazz pianist. Leviev was born in Plovdiv, Bulgaria, into a Bulgarian Jewish family; his father was Izak Leviev and his brother was the artist Yoan Leviev.

== Career ==
Leviev graduated from the Bulgarian State Academy of Music in 1960, majoring in composition under Pancho Vladigerov and in piano under Andrei Stoyanov.

His professional development as a composer began at the Drama Theatre in Plovdiv. After Emil Georgiev left office, Leviev was appointed conductor of the Bulgarian National Radio big band (1962–66). His ideas were innovative in the orchestra; pieces like Studia, Blues in 9 or Anti-waltz combined folklore and jazz. He worked as soloist and conductor of the Sofia and Plovdiv Philharmonic Orchestra from 1963-1968. In 1965, embracing the idea of the writer Radoy Ralin, he founded Jazz Focus '65 with which he toured until 1970, achieving success for Bulgarian jazz and winning prizes at jazz festivals in Montreux, Sofia, and Prague. In 1970, he left Bulgaria and moved to Los Angeles. He performed again in Bulgaria in the early 1980s.

Leviev worked as composer, arranger, and pianist for the Don Ellis Orchestra (1970–1975) and the Billy Cobham Band (1971–77). He toured the U.S. and Europe and was music director for Lainie Kazan (1977–80). He gave concerts and recorded with John Klemmer, Art Pepper, and Roy Haynes. Leviev toured Europe with Pepper (1980–82) and was one of the founders of the fusion band Free Flight.

In 1983, Leviev became music director of the Jazz Sessions at the Comeback Inn in Venice, California. He gave concerts in Japan with bassist Dave Holland (1983–86) and organized solo jazz recitals in Europe (1985–86). He taught jazz composition at the University of Southern California and given master classes at the New Bulgarian University in Sofia. He composed symphony and chamber works, big band, and jazz orchestra music. In the 1960s, he wrote film music.

Leviev died on 12 October 2019 in Thessaloniki, Greece.

== Awards and honors ==
As a student, he won second prize at the International Competition in Vienna for his Toccatina for piano. In 1987, he won the Drama-Logue Award for best music director given by the Pacific Conservatory of the Performing Arts. Some of his works were published by Dick Grove Publications and the Bulgarian publishing house Nauka I Izkustvo (up to 1968). He won a prize at the National Jazz Educational Congress, a Grammy Award for arrangement, and the Honorary Gold Medal of the Académie internationale des Arts in Paris (1995). He was awarded an honorary Doctor Honoris Causa by the Academy of Music, Dance and Fine Arts in Plovdiv (1995) and by the New Bulgarian University. He won in the Best Modern Instrumental Album category at the Armenian Music Awards in 2002 for scoring the Nigol Bezjian film, Chickpeas.

== Discography ==
=== As leader ===
- Piano Lesson (Dobre, 1978)
- Blue Levis (Dobre, 1978)
- What's New (Atlas, 1980)
- Blues for the Fisherman (Mole Jazz, 1980)
- True Blues (Mole Jazz, 1981)
- Plays the Music of Irving Berlin (Discovery, 1982)
- Music for Big Band and Symphony Orchestra (Trend, 1983)
- Destination (Optimism, 1987)
- Bulgarian Piano Blues (MA, 1990)
- The Oracle with Dave Holland (Pan Music, 1992)
- Up & Down with Dave Holland (MA, 1993)
- Jive Sambas (Vartan Jazz, 1997)
- Man from Plovdiv (MA, 1999)
- Quiet Love with Vicky Almazidu (Ethnic Art, 2004)
- Multiple Personalities (Mighty Quinn, 2006)
- Quiet March (Perfect, 2015)

=== As guest ===
With Billy Cobham

- Total Eclipse (Atlantic, 1974)
- Shabazz (Atlantic, 1975)
- A Funky Thide of Sings (Atlantic, 1975)

With Don Ellis

- Tears of Joy (Columbia, 1971)
- Connection (Columbia, 1972)
- Soaring (MPS, 1973)
- Haiku (MPS, 1974)

With Roy Haynes

- Thank You Thank You (Galaxy, 1977)
- Vistalite (Galaxy, 1979)

With Gerald Wilson

- Jessica (Trend, 1983)
- Calafia (Trend, 1985)

With Dusan Bogdanovic

- Winter Tale (Doberman - Yppan, 2008)

With others

- Al Jarreau, Breakin' Away (Warner Bros., 1981)
- Arif Mardin, Journey (Atlantic, 1974)
- Airto Moreira, Virgin Land (Salvation, 1974)
- L. Subramaniam, Fantasy without Limits (Trend, 1980)
