= Jazz Jamboree 1962 =

Studio album by Don Ellis
- Released: 1962
- Recorded: October 17–29, 1962
- Studio: National Philharmonic Hall, Warsaw, Poland.
- Genre: Jazz
- Label: Polskie Nagrania Muza L 0394
- Producer: Richard Bock

Don Ellis chronology
Essence (1962)	Jazz Jamboree 1962 (1962)	Don Ellis Orchestra 'Live' at Monterey! (1966)

Professional ratings
Review scores
Source	Rating
Allmusic	3/5 stars

Jazz Jamboree 1962 [No. 1] is a studio album by American jazz trumpeter Don Ellis recorded in 1962 and released on the Polskie Nagrania Muza label. The record was re-released in Poland in 2013 with the bonus track "Nihil Novi".

== Track listing ==
No.	Title	Writer(s)	Length
1.	"Soloes"	Don Ellis	14:38
2.	"What Is This Thing Called Love?"	Cole Porter	6:47
3.	"Lover"	Lorenz Hart, Richard Rodgers	6:35
4.	"Now's the Time"	Charlie Parker	4:19

== Personnel ==
- Don Ellis – trumpet
- Roman Dyląg – bass
- Andrzej Dąbrowski – drums
- Wojciech Karolak – piano
