= Jean-Luc Fillon =

French musician

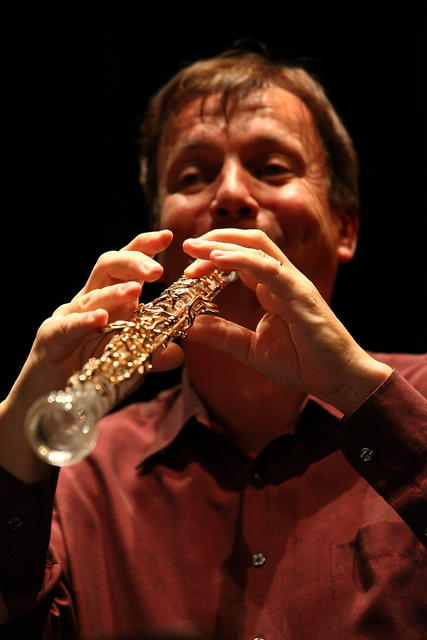
- Fillon Playing His Marigaux 2009 acrylic "altuglas" Oboe

Background information
- Also known as: Oboman
- Genres: Jazz
- Occupation(s): Jazz musician, orchestra conductor, composer
- Instrument(s): Oboe, English Horn, oboe d’amore, double bass, and electric bass
- Years active: 1987–present
- Website: www.jeanlucfillon.com

Jean-Luc Fillon is a French oboist, English hornist, double bassist, electric bassist, orchestra conductor and composer. He began in 1987 as oboe soloist in the European Symphonic Orchestra, and since 2001, Fillon has made numerous musical compositions that use the oboe and English horn in jazz and improvisation.

== Biography ==
Fillon studied classical music and oboe at national academies of Aubervilliers and Versailles and then at l'Ecole Normale Supérieure de Paris. During this period he was the laureate of the San Sebastian chamber music international competition and studied improvisation and composition at the Centre d’informations musicales (Jazz and Contemporary music in Paris).

From 1987 to 1991, he was oboe soloist in the European Symphonic Orchestra. After 1991, he conducted the Jazzogène Orchestra with which he recorded several CDs and played as a soloist with Antoine Hervé, Lauren Newton, Claudio Pontiggia and Franck Tortillier. It was his first main jazz experience. He went on tour in many festivals and parisian jazz clubs with this orchestra. In 1996, he created the Coyoakan trio (trio world jazz) and the Alborada sextuor (world music). In 1998 during a tour, Bob Mintzer was charmed by Fillon's oboe tone and encouraged Fillon to develop a systematic work on the oboe and English horn improvisation. In fact, before 1998 Fillon used these instruments mainly in classical and contemporary music. In 2000, Bob Mintzer composed for him a piece called French Suite. During this period, he also met Nguyên Lê, Pierre Blanchard, Lauren Newton, Claudio Pontiggia, Yves Torchinsky, Pierre-Marie Bonafos.

Since 2001, Fillon's began writing numerous compositions in order to introduce the oboe and English horn's originality in improvisation (selected at the European audition of the Paolo Damiani National Jazz Orchestra, recording of several radio broadcast on France Musiques, creation of Ad Lib Production). In September 2001 he was nominated Jazz teacher at the national academy of Cergy-Pontoise. In early 2002, he recorded his own oboe and English horn composition with Denis Leloup, Pierre Blanchard and Joël Grare. He also recorded with Pierre-Stéphane Michel in the pSM trio, with Joël Grare on drums. From September 2002, Fillon played in Paris with João Paulo and Denis Leloup. In 2003, the releasing of Oboa on CD was a success. He was invited by Glenn Ferris to join the "Newance quartet" with Jeff Boudreaux and Michel Bénita.

In 2004, he created the "De L'air quartet" with Carole Hémard, Yves Torchinsky et Xavier Dessandre, and recorded "Flea Market". He went on tour in Portugal with João Paulo. In 2005, after a tour in Germany, Fillon went to the United States. He played with two jazz bassoonists: Paul Hanson and Michael Rabinowitz. In October, he was invited by Xavier Prévost to play on Radio France. In early 2006, he created Privé de Désert in the frame of the Les Mureaux jazz festival "Ca Va Jazzer". He recorded a new album (Echoes Of Ellington) on Ellington tunes in order to pay tribute to this great musician and give a new perspective on his works.

In 2007, he went on tour in United States with Michael Rabinowitz and the Devil Reeds with a concert in New York. At the same period, he began a residence during two years and a half at L’Onde, the cultural place in Vélizy, France. He created the Oborigins project with Michel Godard, João Paulo and Jarrod Cagwin. Finally he went on tour in Germany and recorded at the Deutschland Radio in Cologne with the Oboa trio. In 2008, he created the On The Reed...Again ! quintet with Michael Rabinowitz. In November, he came out the Oborigins album, elected album of the week on FIP (Radio-Jazz). He also created Hautbois Nomade with the National French Orchestra in closure of the Vélizy's residence. In 2009, Fillon came out the On the Reed... Again ! with a concert in New Morning (Paris). He was invited by Antoine Hervé to play on France Musique. He was also invited by Claude Barthélemy in his new project called Lieder.

== Discography ==
- Jazzogène - L’instant d’après - 1991
- Jazzogène - Rhapsody In Blue - 1993
- Patrice Caratini - Hard Scores - 1996
- Jazzogène - Manhattan Rhapsody - 1998
- Coyoakan - Changes - 1999
- Jean-Luc Fillon trio Oboa - 2003
- Jean-Luc Fillon trio Oboa - Flea Market - 2004
- Jean-Luc Fillon 5tet - Echoes Of Ellington - 2006
- Jean-Luc Fillon - Oborigins - 2008
- Jean-Luc Fillon - On The Reed...Again! - 2009
