= Dennis F. Parker =

American musician and recording engineer (1945–2016)

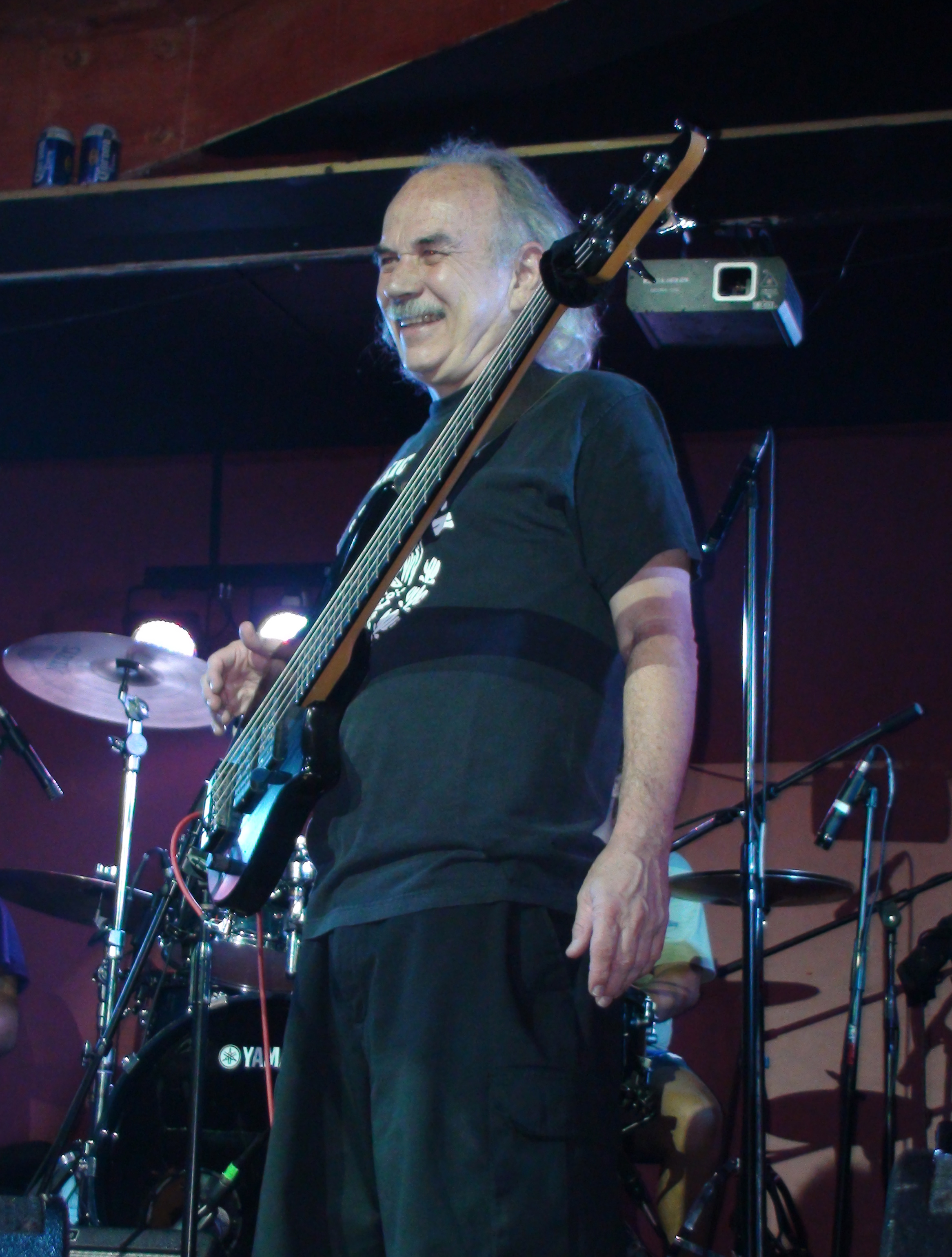

Background information
- Also known as: Deaf Pea
- Born: Dennis Frazer Parker; July 29, 1945; Akron, Ohio, United States
- Died: October 6, 2016 (aged 71)
- Genres: R&B, funk, soul, swing, jazz, bossa nova, hip-hop
- Occupations: Musician, recording engineer, arranger
- Instruments: Electric bass, string bass, electric guitar, tuba, Sousaphone
- Years active: 1961–2014

Dennis F. Parker (July 29, 1945 – October 6, 2016) was an American musician and recording engineer. During six decades in the music industry, Parker earned seven Grammy Award nominations, two Grammys, five Latin Grammy Award nominations, and three Latin Grammys as a performer or recording engineer. He had claim to 18 gold or platinum discs.

== Early life ==
Parker was born in Akron, Ohio, the second son of Jane Sharp Fraizer (1917-2018) and Paul Oliver Parker (1914-1995). Both his parents were schoolteachers with master's degrees from Ohio State University.

He began piano lessons when he was eight years old. When he was 10, his family moved to Tucson, Arizona. He started playing guitar when he was 12. His idols were Elvis Presley and Duane Eddy. He started playing Sousaphone at age 15 at Tucson High School, because band director Bucky Steele told him that he had to be in the marching band in order to be in the school jazz band. At 15, he became a professional musician and joined the American Federation of Musicians, AFL-CIO. At 16, he started playing string bass. From 1961 through 1967, he played electric guitar and string bass with jazz groups in Tucson. From 1964 through 1967, he played tuba in the Tucson Symphony Orchestra and the Tucson Pops Orchestra.

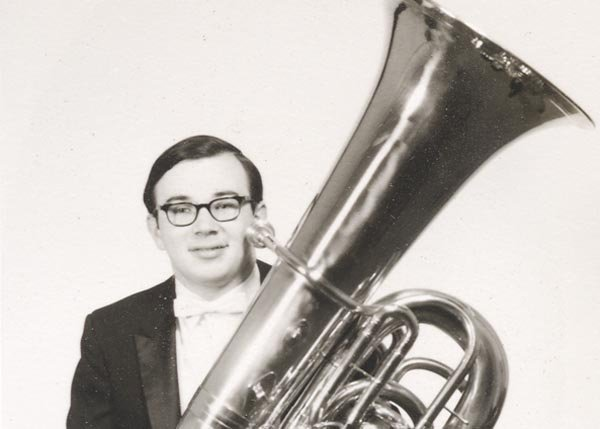
Dennis F. Parker with the Tucson Symphony Orchestra

In 1967, Parker received a Bachelor of Music in Composition and a Bachelor of Music Education from the University of Arizona.

== San Francisco ==
In 1967, Parker moved to San Francisco and was part of the Haight-Ashbury music scene.

He played electric bass in the rock group, Allmen Joy. The group shared the bill at the Fillmore Auditorium, Avalon Ballroom, and Straight Theater with Alice Cooper, Santana, Steve Miller, The Velvet Underground, and many other groups from 1967 to 1969. They played two dates at Chet Helms' Denver Dog with the Doors and Canned Heat in Denver in 1967.

The band also appeared at the Aquarian Family Festival in San Jose, California in May 1969. The group also played at the Sky River Rock Festival and Lighter Than Air Fair near Sultan, Washington. The festival took place from August 30, 1968 through September 2. 1968.

In 1969 and 1970, Parker played sitar and electric bass in the musical "Hair" in San Francisco, Los Angeles, and Las Vegas.

== Los Angeles ==
=== Musician ===
In 1970, Parker moved to Los Angeles and played electric bass in the Don Ellis Orchestra in the Don Ellis at Fillmore and Tears of Joy double albums and the French Connection soundtrack. In the 1970–1980 time period, he also played electric bass with groups led by Willie Bobo, Bobby Hutcherson, John Klemmer, Charlie Musselwhite, Mike Nock, and Gábor Szabó.

From 1972 through 1980, he was a studio musician in Los Angeles. His work with arranger and band leader H. B. Barnum resulted in his electric bass line propelling Al Wilson's Show and Tell to Number 1 on the Billboard charts and a R.I.A.A. Gold record. Parker worked with Barnum from 1973 to 1977. Barnum was also the arranger and band leader for the Osmonds. Parker toured with the Osmonds and was in the band for the Donny & Marie Show on ABC-TV during its first 1976–1977 season.

As a studio musician, he played bass on albums by Roy Buchanan, David Cassidy, Jackie DeShannon, Ned Doheny, Albert Hammond, Tom Jones, Johnny Mathis, Essra Mohawk, Oliver.

Parker also played in world tours backing David Cassidy, Tom Jones, and Johnny Mathis.

=== Recording engineer ===
Parker got his first lessons to become a recording engineer from David Baskind at B & B Sound on Melrose, near Fairfax, in Los Angeles. He continued experimenting and learning in a home studio. In 1979, he started working for Mike Hightower and Wayne Henderson at Wide Track Studios in Van Nuys.

He was recording engineer for albums by Wayne Henderson, Miki Howard, Ronnie Laws, Alphonse Mouzon, Keith Washington, Dwight Sills.

The Miki Howard album peaked at number 4 week of March 24, 1990 on the Billboard R&B albums chart.

In addition, he was the recording engineer for four Ice-T albums: Rhyme Pays, Power, The Iceberg/Freedom of Speech...Just Watch What You Say, and O.G. Original Gangster. The O.G. album peaked at number 9 week of July 13, 1991 on the Billboard R&B albums chart.

== Mexico ==
=== Recording engineer ===
Parker moved with his wife and two sons to Mexico City in November 1990. His third son was born during their time in Mexico City. He was the recording engineer at Estudio Kay-nah in Mexico City owned by Pedro Plascencia and his mother, Carmen Salinas. In December, he was the recording engineer at Estudio Kay-nah and recording Cutberto Perez and his Marachi 2000.

=== Musician ===
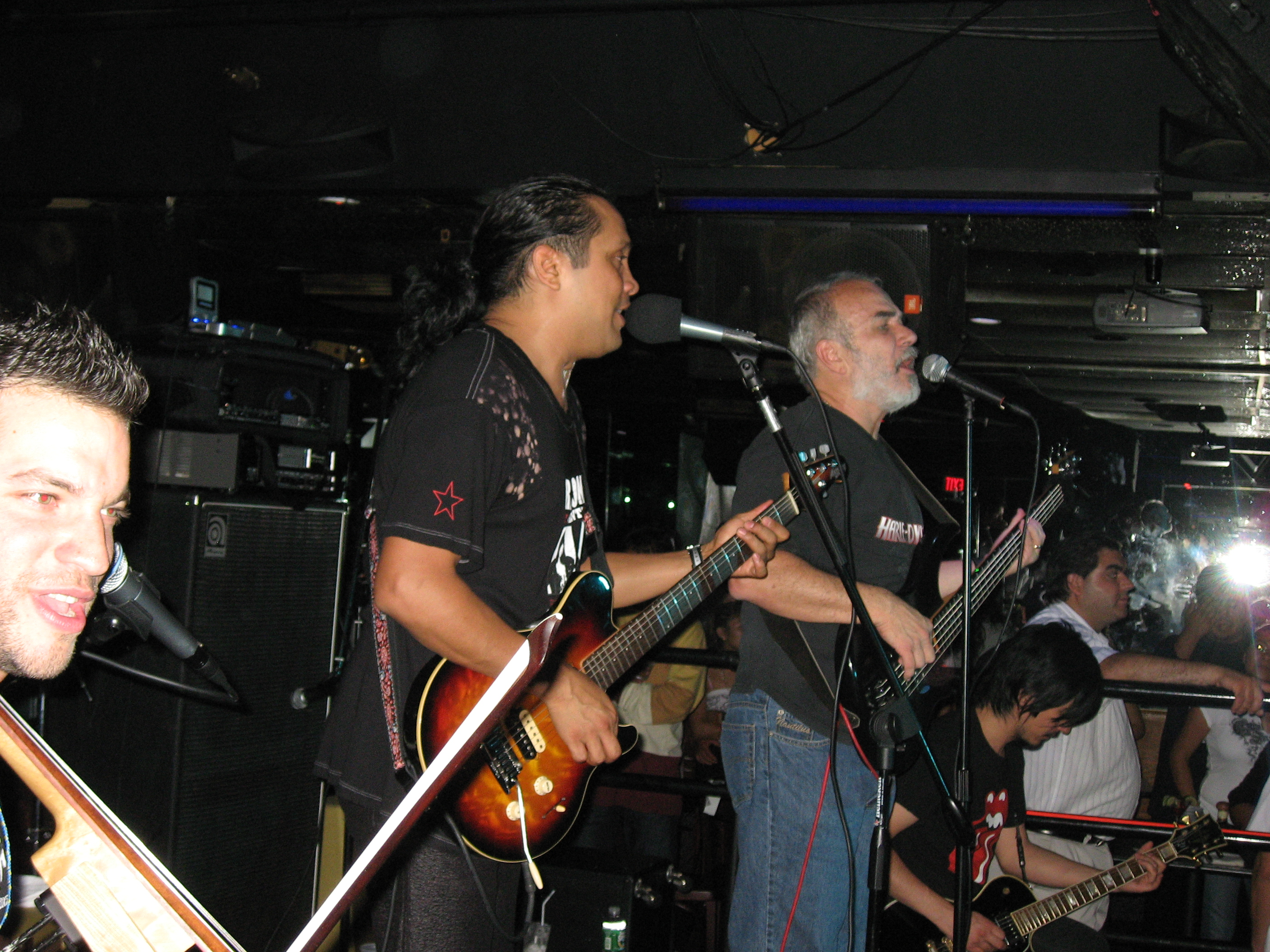
Álvarez and Parker with El Haragán y Compañía at Bamboleo

Parker played the electric bass with the Mexican rock group El Haragán y Compañía for 20 years.

== Partial discography ==
=== Musician ===
Don Ellis Orchestra – Don Ellis at Fillmore (Columbia, 1970) Recorded "Live" at The Fillmore West; San Francisco, CA

Don Ellis Orchestra – Tears of Joy (Columbia, 1971) Recorded "Live" at Basin Street West; San Francisco, CA

Essra Mohawk – Essra Mohawk (Elektra/Asylum, 1974)

Al Wilson – Show and Tell (Bell/Rocky Road, 1973) Billboard No. 1, Week of January 19, 1974. R.I.A.A. Gold

Johnny Mathis – The Heart of a Woman (Columbia, 1974)

The Osmonds – Love Me For a Reason (MGM, 1974)

The Osmonds – Around the World: Live in Concert (MGM, 1975)

Ned Doheny – Hard Candy (Sony, 1976)

Tom Jones – Say You'll Stay Until Tomorrow (Epic, 1977)

Roy Buchanan – Loading Zone (Polydor, 1977)

Jackie DeShannon – You're the Only Dancer (1977)

Oliver – Prism (United Artists)

Ned Doheny – Prone (Sony, 1979)

Albert Hammond – Your World and My World (Sony, 1980)

Roy Buchanan – Guitar on Fire (Rhino, 1993)

=== Recording engineer ===
Alphonse Mouzon – The Sky is the Limit (Tenacious, 1985)

Miki Howard – Miki Howard (Atlantic, 1989) Peaked at number 4 week of March 24, 1990 on the Billboard R&B albums chart.

Ronnie Laws – True Spirit (Paramount, 1989)

The Five Heartbeats – The Five Heartbeats (Capitol, 1991)

Keith Washington – Make Time for Love (Qwest, 1991)

Wayne Henderson – Back to the Groove (Paramount, 1992)

Dwight Sills – Second Wind (Columbia, 1992)

Ronnie Laws – Deep Soul (Paramount, 1992)

==== Ice-T ====
Rhyme Pays (Sire, 1987)

Power (Sire, 1988)

The Iceberg/Freedom of Speech...Just Watch What You Say (Sire, 1989)

O.G. Original Gangster (Sire, 1991) Peaked at number 9 week of July 13, 1991 on the Billboard R&B albums chart.

==== Joan Sebastian ====
- Más Allá Del Sol Best Banda Album – 2006 Latin Grammy Awards
- No Es De Madera Best Banda Album nomination – 2008 Latin Grammy Awards

==== Vicente Fernandez ====
- Para Siempre Best Ranchero Album and Album of the Year Nomination - 2008 Latin Grammy Awards

== Television and film ==
- The French Connection – Don Ellis Orchestra – electric bass, 1972 Grammy Awards, Best Jazz Performance by A Big Band Nomination
- The Affair – 1973 – playing electric bass in the recording studio scene with Natalie Wood
- Donny & Marie Show (ABC, 1976-1977)
- The Five Heartbeats – 1991 – engineer for soundtrack recording
- Haragan y Cia - Acustico (En Vivo)
