= Lisa Brown (New Hampshire politician) =

American politician

Member-elect of the New Hampshire House of Representatives from the Merrimack 28th district
- Assuming office December 2026
- Succeeding: Jim Snodgrass

Personal details
- Party: Democratic

Lisa Brown is an American politician. A member of the Democratic Party, she is the member-elect for the Merrimack 28th district of the New Hampshire House of Representatives.
