= Soaring (album) =

Studio album by Don Ellis
- Released: 1973
- Recorded: 1973
- Genre: Jazz fusion; orchestral jazz
- Length: 42:12
- Label: MPS/BASF
- Producer: Don Ellis

Don Ellis chronology
Connection (1972)	Soaring (1973)	Haiku (1973)

Soaring is an album by trumpeter Don Ellis recorded in 1973 and released on the MPS label. The album features Hank Levy's composition "Whiplash", which was featured in the 2014 film of the same name.

== Reception ==
Professional ratings
Review scores
Source	Rating
AllMusic	4/5 stars

Scott Yanow of AllMusic called it an "underrated set ...well worth searching for". On Jazz History Online, Michael Verity observed "By 1973, when he recorded Soaring, a 10-cut musical haiku, all of his interests were converging into a style that was bold, intensely rhythmic and perfectly calibrated sound for the big screen. (It should be no surprise he was scoring The French Connection at same time he was working on this project)."

== Track listing ==
All tracks are written by Don Ellis, except where noted.

Side A
No.	Title	Writer(s)	Length
1.	"Whiplash"	Hank Levy	4:25
2.	"Saldka Pitka"	Milcho Leviev	6:40
3.	"The Devil Made Me Write This Piece"		6:00
4.	"Go Back Home"	Sam Falzone	3:15

Side B
No.	Title	Writer(s)	Length
1.	"Invincible"		6:43
2.	"Image of Maria"		3:03
3.	"Sidonie"	Alexej Fried	6:37
4.	"Nicole"		5:29
Total length:			42:12

== Personnel ==
- Don Ellis – trumpet, flugelhorn, drums, arranger
- Fred Selden – alto saxophone, flute, soprano saxophone, piccolo, alto flute
- Vince Denham – alto saxophone, tenor saxophone, soprano saxophone, flute, piccolo
- Sam Falzone – tenor saxophone, clarinet, flute, arranger
- Gary Herbig – baritone saxophone, soprano saxophone, clarinet, flute, oboe
- Jack Caudill, Bruce Mackay, Gil Rathel – trumpet, flugelhorn
- Sidney Muldrow – French horn
- Mike Jamieson – trombone
- Ken Sawhill – bass trombone
- Doug Bixby – tuba
- Jay Graydon – guitar, bag
- Milcho Leviev – piano, electric piano, organ, clavinet, arranger
- Dave McDaniel – bass
- Ralph Humphrey – drums
- Ron Dunn – drums, percussion
- Lee Pastora – congas
- Earle Corry, Joel Quivey – electric violin
- Renita Koven – electric viola
- Pat Kudzia – electric cello
- Alexej Fried, Hank Levy – arranger
