= Jim Snodgrass =

American politician

Member of the New Hampshire House of Representatives from the Merrimack 28th district
- Incumbent
- Assumed office December 4, 2024
- Preceded by: Art Ellison
- Succeeded by: Lisa Brown (elect)

Personal details
- Party: Democratic

Jim Snodgrass is an American politician. He serves as a Democratic member for the Merrimack 28th district of the New Hampshire House of Representatives.
