= Luna Parker =

French pop group

- Origin: France
- Genres: Rock, pop
- Years active: 1986–1988
- Members: Rachel Ortas; Eric Tabuchi

Luna Parker was a French pop group in the 1980s.

== History ==
Rachel Ortas and Eric Tabuchi formed the pop duo after leaving the French new wave band Tokow Boys. Their single Tes états d'âme Éric was an enormous hit in France in 1986. They only released one album Félin pour l'autre in 1988. Their songs are lighthearted and cute and their lyrics use a lot of silly word play: for example, the title of their album can mean in English either "feline for another" or "made for each other."

== Discography ==
Singles

- 1986 : Tes états d'âme Éric (#10 in France, Silver disc)
- 1987 : Le challenge des espoirs
- 1988 : Fric-Frac
- 1988 : Tic-Taquatique

Albums

- 1988 : Félin pour l'autre
