= Don Ellis Orchestra 'Live' at Monterey! =

Live album by Don Ellis Orchestra
- Released: 1967
- Recorded: September 18 and October 18, 1966; Monterey Jazz Festival, Monterey and The Pacific Jazz Festival, Costa Mesa
- Genre: Jazz
- Labels: Pacific Jazz; PJ 10112
- Producers: Richard Bock, Bob Belden

Don Ellis chronology
Jazz Jamboree 1962 (1962)	Don Ellis Orchestra 'Live' at Monterey! (1967)	Live in 3⅔/4 Time (1966)

Don Ellis Orchestra 'Live' at Monterey! is a live album by trumpeter Don Ellis recorded in 1966 at the Monterey Jazz Festival and released on the Pacific Jazz label.

== Reception ==
Professional ratings
Review scores
Source	Rating
Allmusic	4.5/5 stars
The Penguin Guide to Jazz	3.5/4 stars

Scott Yanow in his review for Allmusic stated, "One of the most exciting new jazz big bands of the period, Ellis' ensemble became notorious for its ability to play coherently in odd time signatures... Ellis enjoyed utilizing unusual combinations of instruments; the instrumentation on this date consists of five trumpets, three trombones, five saxes, piano, three bassists, two drummers and a percussionist... Highly recommended". The Penguin Guide to Jazz said "Ellis manages to combine intellectual stimulation and visceral impact".

== Track listing ==
All compositions by Don Ellis except as indicated

1. Introduction by Jimmy Lyons - 1:18 Bonus track on CD reissue
2. "33 222 1 222" - 9:51
3. "Passacaglia and Fugue" (Hank Levy) - 6:13
4. "Crete Idea" - 6:14 Bonus track on CD reissue
5. "Concerto for Trumpet" - 11:48
6. "27/16" - 6:01 Bonus track on CD reissue
7. "Beat Me Daddy, 7 to the Bar" - 8:24 Bonus track on CD reissue
8. "New Nine" - 11:18
- Recorded at The Monterey Jazz Festival in Monterey, California on September 18, 1966 except for track 5 which was recorded at The Pacific Jazz Festival, Costa Mesa, CA on October 8, 1966. (The CD liner notes incorrectly give the date of the Pacific Jazz Festival performance as October 18.)

== Personnel ==
- Don Ellis - trumpet, arranger
- Alan Weight, Ed Warren, Glenn Stuart, Paul Lopez - trumpet
- Dave Wells, Ron Meyers - trombone
- Terry Woodson - bass trombone
- Ruben Leon - alto saxophone, soprano saxophone, flute
- Tom Scott - alto saxophone, saxello, flute
- Ira Shulman - tenor saxophone, alto saxophone, clarinet
- Ron Starr - tenor saxophone, flute, clarinet
- John Magruder - baritone saxophone, flute, clarinet, bass clarinet
- David MacKay - organ, piano
- Frank DeLaRosa, Chuck Domanico, Ray Neapolitan - bass
- Alan Estes, Steve Bohannon - drums
- Chino Valdes - bongos, congas
- Hank Levy - arranger (track 3)
