= Virgin Land (album) =

Studio album by Airto
- Released: 1974
- Recorded: February 4 & 19, 1974; Los Angeles, California and New York City
- Genre: Jazz, jazz rock, samba jazz, Brazilian music
- Length: 39:48
- Label: Salvation; SAL 701
- Producer: Billy Cobham

Airto Moreira chronology
Fingers (1973)	Virgin Land (1974)	Identity (1975)

Virgin Land is an album by Brazilian jazz drummer and percussionist Airto Moreira (who was credited simply as "Airto") featuring performances recorded in 1974 and released on the Salvation label.

== Reception ==
The Allmusic review states "An all-star cast accompanies Brazilian percussion master Airto Moreira on this percolating collection of jazz fusion pieces".

Professional ratings
Review scores
Source	Rating
Allmusic	4/5 stars
The Rolling Stone Jazz Record Guide	3/5 stars

== Track listing ==
All compositions by Airto Moreira except as indicated

1. "Stanley's Tune" (Stanley Clarke) – 4:34
2. "Musikana" (Gabriel DeLorme) – 7:08
3. "Virgin Land" – 8:19
4. "Peasant Dance" (Milcho Leviev) – 3:33
5. "Lydian Riff" (Leviev) – 7:22
6. "Hot Sand" – 5:35
7. "I Don't Have To Do What I Don't Want To Do" (DeLorme, Moreira) – 3:17

- Recorded in Los Angeles, California on February 4, 1974 and in New York City on February 19, 1974

== Personnel ==
- Airto – drums, percussion, vocals
- George Duke – keyboards, piano, synthesizer
- Milcho Leviev – keyboards
- Kenny Ascher – piano, mellotron
- David Amaro, Gabriel DeLorme – electric guitar
- Alex Blake, Stanley Clarke – electric bass
- Flora Purim – vocals
- Eddie Daniels – clarinet
- George Marge – oboe, piccolo
- Jane Taylor – bassoon
