= Hank Levy =

American jazz musician (1927–2001)

Background information
- Born: Henry Jacob Levy; September 27, 1927; Baltimore, Maryland
- Died: September 18, 2001 (aged 73) Parkville, Maryland
- Genre: Jazz
- Occupations: Composer, saxophonist, teacher
- Instrument: Baritone saxophone
- Website: hanklevyjazz.com

Henry Jacob "Hank" Levy (September 27, 1927 – September 18, 2001) was an American jazz composer and saxophonist whose works often employed unusual time signatures. He is best known as a big band composer for Stan Kenton and the Don Ellis Orchestra, as well as the founder and long-time director of Towson University's Jazz Program.

== Life and career ==
Levy was born in Baltimore, Maryland, United States. Levy was a saxophone player and briefly played baritone saxophone for Stan Kenton, but he was most known for his composing and arranging, specifically in odd time signatures. His interest in odd meters predated Dave Brubeck's Time Out album. He studied composition with George Thaddeus Jones at Catholic University in Washington, D.C., and became interested in odd meters through their use by such composers as Paul Hindemith, Maurice Ravel, and Igor Stravinsky. He was also a particularly good composer of counterpoint, which can be heard in such compositions as "Passacaglia and Fugue" (recorded by Don Ellis on 'Live' at Monterey!) and "Quintessence" (performed, but not recorded, by Stan Kenton).

Levy was also a prolific arranger of jazz standards, though few of these arrangements were published during his lifetime. He was especially fond of the music of the stage as it came through bebop: Cole Porter, George Gershwin, Jerome Kern. In his last years, he more frequently turned to bebop originals, tunes by Charlie Parker, Dizzy Gillespie, Tadd Dameron. Though these arrangements rarely featured the odd meters he was associated with, and were typically conventional in style, they often displayed a distinctive creativity.

Levy began his full-time college teaching career at Towson State University in late 1967, creating The Towson State Jazz Ensemble. By 1970, his hard work and passion for teaching brought the band to national prominence when his Towson State Jazz Ensemble competed and won the outstanding band honors at the Notre Dame Collegiate Jazz Festival. Additional honors went to Levy's lead trumpet player, Tony Neenan, who was voted "Best Lead Trumpet" of the festival. He was Professor Emeritus of Towson University. He was posthumously honored by Towson University in a ceremony on April 13, 2017.

Levy died of congestive heart failure in Parkville, Maryland, aged 73, on September 18, 2001.

== Selected works with odd time signatures ==
- "3 Phases of V" 5/4 (recorded by Towson State University Jazz Ensemble on Jazz '78)
- "90 Degrees Celsius" 5/4 (recorded by Stan Kenton on Journey Into Capricorn)
- "Abovo" 7/4 and 13/4 (performed by Don Ellis)
- "Alone" 5/4 (recorded by The Jazz Ambassadors on The Legacy of Hank Levy)
- "Along Came Ritchie" ^{3 1/2}_{4}, 7/2 and 7/4 (recorded by Towson State University Jazz Ensemble on Jazz)
- "Ambivalence" 5/4 (recorded by Stan Kenton on Birthday in Britain)
- "Anti-Ergophobia" 5/4 and 10/8 (performed by Don Ellis)
- "Antea" 7/4 (recorded by Don Ellis)
- "A Peek Into A New Time Zone" 14/4 and 7/4 (recorded by The Jazz Ambassadors on The Legacy of Hank Levy)
- "Blues, Between and Betwixt" 7/4 and 7/8 (recorded by Stan Kenton on Birthday in Britain and Live at Butler University)
- "Bop City Revisited" 7/4 (recorded by Towson State University Jazz Ensemble on 2 + 2 = 5)
- "Chain Reaction" 13/8 (recorded by Don Ellis on Connection (Columbia, 1972))
- "Chiapas" 5/4, 7/4, and 8/4 (recorded by Stan Kenton on Live at Redlands University and Double Feature: Vol. 3)
- "Decoupage" 5/4 (recorded by Stan Kenton on Kenton '76)
- "Down and Dirty" 5/4 and 10/8 (recorded by Stan Kenton on 7.5 on the Richter Scale)
- "Down Home Cookin'"
- "Early Riser" 7/4 (recorded by Towson State University Jazz Ensemble on Jazz '76)
- "Enter Stage Left" 5/4
- "Fringe Benefit" 5/4 (recorded by Stan Kenton on Live at Butler University)
- "Fun Time" 11/4 (recorded by Towson State University Jazz Ensemble on Jazz)
- "Hank's Opener" 7/4 and 14/8 (recorded by Stan Kenton on Live at Brigham Young University)
- "Indra" 9/4 (recorded by Stan Kenton on Live at Butler University)
- "Interchange" 7/4 (recorded by Towson State University Jazz Ensemble on Jazz '80)
- "Journey into Capricorn" 5/4 (recorded by Stan Kenton on Journey Into Capricorn)
- "Latin Implosion" 5/4 (recorded by Towson State University Jazz Ensemble on Jazz '81)
- "Lighthouse Point" 7/4 (recorded by Towson State University Jazz Ensemble on Jazz '77)
- "Of Fourths and Fifths" 7/4 (performed by Stan Kenton)
- "Of Space and Time" 5/4 (recorded by Stan Kenton on Birthday in Britain)
- "Pavanne" 7/4 (recorded by Towson State University Jazz Ensemble on Jazz)
- "Pegasus" 6/8 (recorded by Stan Kenton on Journey Into Capricorn)
- "Pete is a Four-Letter Word" 7/2 and 7/4 (recorded by Stan Kenton on Fire, Fury, and Fun)
- "Poopsie's Penthouse" 11/4 (recorded by Towson State University Jazz Ensemble on 2 + 2 = 5)
- "Profile of a Lead Trumpet Player" 5/4 (recorded by Towson State University Jazz Ensemble on Jazz '81)
- "Quiet Friday" 5/4 (recorded by Stan Kenton on Fire, Fury, and Fun)
- "Quintessence" 5/4 (recorded by Towson State University Jazz Ensemble on Jazz '77)
- "Reflections of Richard" ^{3 1/2}_{4} and 10/4 (recorded by Towson State University Jazz Ensemble on Jazz)
- "Rock Odyssey" 7/4 and 12/4 (recorded by Don Ellis on Don Ellis at Fillmore (Columbia, 1970))
- "Samba Bajada" 9/4 (recorded by Don Ellis on Tears of Joy (Columbia, 1971))
- "Samba Siete" 7/4 (recorded by Stan Kenton on Live at Butler University and Double Feature: Vol. 3)
- "Shenandoah Junction" 5/4 (recorded by Towson State University Jazz Ensemble on Jazz '86)
- "Sound Piece" 11/4 (recorded by Towson State University Jazz Ensemble on Jazz '80)
- "Southern Exposure" 5/4
- "A Step Beyond" 5/4 (recorded by Stan Kenton on Live at Brigham Young University)
- "Stillness Runs Deep" 11/4 (recorded by Towson State University Jazz Ensemble on 2 + 2 = 5)
- "Terracotta" 5/4 (recorded by Towson State University Jazz Ensemble on Jazz '78)
- "Time For A Change" 9/4 (recorded by Stan Kenton on Kenton '76)
- "Tribute" 10/8 (recorded by Towson State University Jazz Ensemble on Jazz '77)
- "Warp Factor V" 5/4 (recorded by Towson State University Jazz Ensemble on Jazz '78)
- "Whiplash" 7/4 and 14/8 (recorded by Don Ellis on Soaring (MPS, 1973))
- "With the Old Man in Mind" 5/4 (recorded by The Jazz Ambassadors on The Legacy of Stan Kenton)

== Written and recorded legacy ==
While Levy was director in 1975, the Towson State Jazz Ensemble recorded 2 + 2 = 5, an album of six of his compositions for Music Minus One, which specializes in recordings leaving out the part for one instrument so a musician can play along. The recording comprised Levy compositions, all but one in odd meter: "Bop City Revisited", "Poopsie's Penthouse", "A Quiet Friday", "Pete Is a Four-Letter Word", "Bread and Watrous", and "Stillness Runs Deep". Personnel on the recording who also have performed with the Hank Levy Alumni Band include Steve Ashcraft (drums) and Ray Disney (trumpet).

Today, Levy's music is performed by the Hank Levy Legacy Band based in Towson, Maryland. The band was founded in 1992 following his retirement from full-time teaching. The band has recorded two live CDs: Hank At Home (2000) and An "Odd-Time" Was Had By All (2004), both distributed by Sonority Records.

The 2014 jazz film Whiplash takes its title from Levy's composition which originally appeared on the 1973 album Soaring by Don Ellis and portions of which are played throughout the course of the film.

A handful of Levy's works are still in print through various distributors. His most well-known works, those recorded by Stan Kenton and originally published through Creative World, are now distributed by Sierra Music Publications, headed by Robert Curnow, another Kenton composer.

== Sources ==
- Biographical Dictionary of Jazz, by Charles Eugene Claghorn, Prentice Hall, Englewood Cliffs, New Jersey (1982)
- The Encyclopedia of Jazz in the Seventies, by Leonard Feather and Ira Gitler, Horizon Press, New York (1976)
