= Music from Other Galaxies and Planets =

Studio album by Don Ellis
- Released: 1977
- Recorded: 1977
- Genre: Jazz
- Length: 40:26
- Label: Atlantic; SD 19178
- Producer: Don Ellis

Don Ellis chronology
| Haiku (1974) | Music from Other Galaxies and Planets (1977) | Don Ellis Live at Montreux (1978) |

Music from Other Galaxies and Planets is an album by trumpeter/bandleader Don Ellis, recorded in 1977 and released on the Atlantic label. The album features Ellis' recording of the "Theme from Star Wars" which was released as a single.

== Reception ==
Professional ratings
Review scores
| Source | Rating |
|---|---|
| AllMusic | 1/5 stars |
| The Penguin Guide to Jazz Recordings | 2/4 stars |
| The Rolling Stone Jazz Record Guide | 3/5 stars |

The album was not particularly well received, despite the massive popularity of Star Wars and the John Williams score. Scott Yanow of AllMusic said: "This LP is the only complete misfire of Don Ellis' career... Ellis' big band has little to do other than play mundane ensembles and take occasional short solos. This is the one Don Ellis record that should be skipped".

== Track listing ==
All compositions by Don Ellis except as indicated

1. "Star Wars" (John Williams) - 3:23
2. "Arcturas" - 5:44
3. "Princess Leia's Theme" (Williams) - 3:49
4. "Orion's Sword" - 3:47
5. "Pegasus" - 2:44
6. "Crypton" - 3:31
7. "Lyra" - 5:51
8. "Eros" - 4:12
9. "Ursa" - 2:48
10. "Vulcan" - 4:37

== Personnel ==
- Don Ellis - trumpet, firebird trumpet, flugelhorn, superbone, arranger
- Ann Patterson – alto saxophone, soprano saxophone, oboe, piccolo, alto flute
- Ted Nash - alto saxophone, flute, clarinet
- James Coile - tenor saxophone, clarinet, flute
- Jim Snodgrass - baritone saxophone, bass clarinet, piccolo, flute, oboe
- Glenn Stuart, Gil Rathel, Jack Coan – trumpet
- Sidney Muldrew – French Horn
- Alan Kaplan – trombone
- Richard Bullock – bass trombone
- Jim Self – tuba
- Randy Kerber – synthesizer, piano, electric piano, clavinet
- Darrel Clayborn - double bass
- Dave Crigger, Mike Englander - drums
- Chino Valdes, Ruth Richie - percussion
- Pam Tompkins, Laurie Badessa - violin
- Jimbo Ross - viola
- Paula Hochhalter - cello
