= Jimmy Raney featuring Bob Brookmeyer =

Studio album by Jimmy Raney
- Released: 1956
- Recorded: July and August 1956
- Studio: New York City
- Genre: Jazz
- Length: 34:51
- Label: ABC-Paramount
- Producer: Creed Taylor

Jimmy Raney chronology
Jimmy Raney in Three Attitudes (1956)	Jimmy Raney featuring Bob Brookmeyer (1956)	2 Guitars (1957)

Bob Brookmeyer chronology
Whooeeee (1956)	Jimmy Raney featuring Bob Brookmeyer (1956)	Brookmeyer (1956)

Jimmy Raney featuring Bob Brookmeyer is an album by jazz guitarist Jimmy Raney and trombonist Bob Brookmeyer which was recorded in 1956 for the ABC-Paramount label.

== Reception ==
Professional ratings
Review scores
Source	Rating
AllMusic	3.5/5 stars

AllMusic gave the album 3½ stars and its review by Thom Jurek states, "This is as fine a set from the end of the cool jazz period as one is likely to hear."

== Track listing ==
No.	Title	Length
1.	"Isn't It Romantic?" (Richard Rodgers, Lorenz Hart)	4:09
2.	"How Long Has This Been Going On?" (George Gershwin, Ira Gershwin)	4:34
3.	"No Male for Me" (Brookmeyer)	4:22
4.	"The Flag Is Up" (Raney)	4:13
5.	"Get Off That Roof" (Brookmeyer)	4:10
6.	"Jim's Tune" (Raney)	4:05
7.	"Nobody Else But Me" (Jerome Kern, Oscar Hammerstein II)	5:01
8.	"Too Late Now" (Burton Lane, Alan Jay Lerner)	4:17

== Personnel ==
- Jimmy Raney – guitar
- Bob Brookmeyer – valve trombone
- Hank Jones – piano (tracks 3, 4, 7 & 8)
- Dick Katz – piano (tracks 1, 2, 5, & 6)
- Teddy Kotick – double bass
- Osie Johnson – drums
