= Don Ellis Live at Montreux =

Live album by Don Ellis
- Released: 1978
- Recorded: July 8, 1977 at the Montreux Jazz Festival, Switzerland
- Genre: Jazz
- Length: 46:46 (LP); 71:46 (CD)
- Label: Atlantic; SD 19178
- Producer: Don Ellis

Don Ellis chronology
Music from Other Galaxies and Planets (1977)	Don Ellis Live at Montreux (1978)	Pieces of Eight: Live at UCLA (2006)

Don Ellis Live at Montreux is a live album by trumpeter/bandleader Don Ellis recorded in 1977 and released on the Atlantic label.

== Reception ==
Professional ratings
Review scores
Source	Rating
Allmusic	3/5 stars
The Penguin Guide to Jazz Recordings	3/4 stars

Scott Yanow of Allmusic said "Don Ellis' final record as a leader (he died from a bad heart in December 1978) is a worthwhile effort. Ellis' large orchestra (four reeds, eight brass, one keyboard, two bassists, two drummers, two percussionists and a string quartet) performs six of the leader's originals and, although none of the songs are all that memorable, there are many fine solos". On All About Jazz, Jim Santella observed "this album from the Don Ellis library contains all the rhythmic and polyphonic excitement that you’d expect from such a pioneer in modern big band jazz. ...the album has a significant place in the history of jazz. Ellis influenced many. His legacy continues to inspire"

== Track listing ==
All compositions by Don Ellis

1. "Open Wide" - 9:40
2. "Loneliness" - 5:54
3. "Future Feature" - 7:18
4. "Go No Go" - 5:10
5. "Sporting Dance" - 8:45
6. "Niner Two" - 11:59
7. "Lyra" - 8.32 Bonus track on CD reissue
8. "Eros" - 5:39 Bonus track on CD reissue
9. "Arcturus" - 10:49 Bonus track on CD reissue

== Personnel ==
- Don Ellis - quartertone trumpet, firebird trumpet, flugelhorn, superbone, arranger
- Ann Patterson – alto saxophone, soprano saxophone, oboe, piccolo, alto flute
- Ted Nash - alto saxophone, flute, clarinet
- James Coile - tenor saxophone, clarinet, flute
- Jim Snodgrass - baritone saxophone, bass clarinet, piccolo, flute, oboe
- Glenn Stuart, Gil Rathel, Jack Coan – trumpet
- Sidney Muldrew – French Horn
- Alan Kaplan – trombone
- Richard Bullock – bass trombone
- Jim Self – tuba
- Randy Kerber – keyboards
- Darrel Clayborn - double bass
- Leon Gaer - electric bass
- Dave Crigger, Mike Englander - drums
- Ruth Richie - percussion, timpani
- Chino Valdes - congas, bongos
- Pam Tompkins, Lori Badessa - violin
- Jimbo Ross - viola
- Paula Hochhalter - cello
