= New Works Celebration =

Studio album by Bob Brookmeyer New Art Orchestra
- Released: September 14, 1999
- Recorded: July 28–30, 1997
- Studio: Bauer Studio, Ludwigburg, Germany
- Genre: Jazz
- Length: 68:31
- Label: Challenge; CHR 70066
- Producer: Bob Brookmeyer

Bob Brookmeyer chronology
Old Friends (1994)	New Works Celebration (1999)	Out of This World (1998)

New Works Celebration is an album by Bob Brookmeyer's New Art Orchestra featuring tracks recorded in 1997 and released on the Challenge label.

== Reception ==
Professional ratings
Review scores
Source	Rating
AllMusic	4.5/5 stars
Penguin Guide to Jazz	4/4 stars

Ken Dryden of AllMusic called it a "stunning release" that is "Highly recommended!". on All About Jazz Douglas Payne said "The captivating New Work (Celebration), though, is remarkable evidence of the intricate musical language Bob Brookmeyer has crafted as a composer. In the realm of his own inner logic - informed by Sauter and Stravinsky as much as George Russell and even Boulez - Brookmeyer has conceived something that is as warm and passionate as it is cerebral and sometimes startling". The Penguin Guide to Jazz nominated the album as part of its "Core Collection" of recommended jazz recordings.

== Track listing ==
All compositions by Bob Brookmeyer.

1. "Celebration Jig" - 2:31
2. "Celebration Slow Dance" - 8:23
3. "Celebration Remembering" - 10:59
4. "Celebration Two And" - 10:16
5. "Idyll" - 9:37
6. "Duets" - 12:45
7. "Cameo" - 4:28
8. "Boom Boom" - 9:32

== Personnel ==
- Bob Brookmeyer - valve trombone
- Thorsten Benkenstein, Jorg Engels, Ralf Hesse, Torsten Mass, Sebastian Strempel - trumpet
- Christian Jakso, Ludwig Nuss, Ansgar Striepens - trombone
- Edward Partyka - bass trombone
- Marko Lackner, Stefan Pfeifer - alto saxophone
- Marcus Bartelt, Scott Robinson - baritone saxophone
- Nils van Haften, Paul Heller - tenor saxophone
- Kris Goessens - piano
- Jurgen Grimm - keyboard
- Ingmar Heller - bass
- John Hollenbeck - drums
- Christopher Dell - percussion
