= Valide trombone =

Hybrid brass instrument with both a trombone-like slide and valves

Brass instrument
- Classification: Wind; Brass; Aerophone
- Hornbostel–Sachs classification: 423.2 (Sliding and Valved aerophone sounded by lip movement)
- Developed: Mid 20th century

Related instruments
- Firebird; Superbone; Valve trombone

Musicians
- Brad Gowans; Juan Tizol

Builders
- Getzen

The valide trombone is a hybrid valve trombone invented in the 1940s by the American jazz musician Brad Gowans. It has both a set of three piston valves and a slide to vary the pitch. The slide on the valide is positioned within the valve section, and is shorter than a regular trombone slide, only covering four slide positions instead of the usual seven. The slide does not lock, requiring the player to hold the slide at all times, and encouraging the player to use both the valves and the slide together.

The only known built instrument now resides at the Institute of Jazz Studies at Rutgers University. The last noted player of the valide trombone was Juan Tizol of the Duke Ellington and Harry James Orchestras.

The similar superbone, as developed by Larry Ramirez of Holton Musical Instruments in the 1970s and used by Maynard Ferguson and Ashley Alexander, has a full-length slide with seven positions, placed between the mouthpiece and the valves.

== Bibliography ==
- Herbert, Trevor (2006). The Trombone. Yale Musical Instrument Series. New Haven: Yale University Press. ISBN 978-0-300-23575-3. OCLC 1007305405. OL 30593699M. Wikidata Q111039091.
- Yeo, Douglas (2021). An Illustrated Dictionary for the Modern Trombone, Tuba, and Euphonium Player. Dictionaries for the Modern Musician. Illustrator: Lennie Peterson. Lanham: Rowman & Littlefield. ISBN 978-1-5381-5966-8. LCCN 2021020757. OCLC 1249799159. OL 34132790M. Wikidata Q111040546.
