= Bob Brookmeyer Plays Bob Brookmeyer and Some Others =

Studio album by Bob Brookmeyer
- Released: 1955
- Recorded: January 17, 1955; Los Angeles, CA
- Genre: Jazz
- Label: Clef; MGC 644
- Producer: Norman Granz

Bob Brookmeyer chronology
Bob Brookmeyer Quartet (1954)	Bob Brookmeyer Plays Bob Brookmeyer and Some Others (1955)	The Dual Role of Bob Brookmeyer (1956)

The Modernity of Bob Brookmeyer cover

Bob Brookmeyer Plays Bob Brookmeyer and Some Others (also released as The Modernity of Bob Brookmeyer) is an album by jazz trombonist and pianist Bob Brookmeyer recorded in January 1955 for the Clef label.

== Reception ==
Professional ratings
Review scores
Source	Rating
Allmusic	4/5 stars

The Allmusic review by Ken Dryden stated: "the valve trombonist was extremely busy in the studios (as both a leader and a sideman) at this point in his career, and he prolifically turned out top-notch arrangements such as the seven tracks on this record".

== Track listing ==
All compositions by Bob Brookmeyer, except as indicated.

1. "You Took Advantage of Me" (Richard Rodgers, Lorenz Hart) - 5:36
2. "There Will Never Be Another You" (Harry Warren, Mack Gordon) - 4:25
3. "What Is There to Say" (Vernon Duke, Yip Harburg) - 3:44
4. "He Ain't Got Rhythm" (Irving Berlin) - 4:01
5. "Jasmin" - 4:38
6. "The Bulldog Blues" - 8:03
7. "Sticks and Stems" - 5:34

== Personnel ==
- Bob Brookmeyer - valve trombone
- Jimmy Rowles - piano
- Buddy Clark - bass
- Mel Lewis - drums
