= Whooeeee =

Studio album by Zoot Sims-Bob Brookmeyer Quintet
- Released: 1956
- Recorded: February 8, 1956; New York City
- Genre: Jazz
- Length: 38:11
- Label: Storyville; STLP 914
- Producer: George Wein

Bob Brookmeyer chronology
Tonite's Music Today (1956)	Whooeeee (1956)	Jimmy Raney featuring Bob Brookmeyer (1956)

Zoot Sims chronology
Tonite's Music Today (1956)	Whooeeee (1956)	Zoot Sims Goes to Jazzville (1956)

Whooeeee (also released as Today's Jazz and Morning Fun) is an album by the Zoot Sims-Bob Brookmeyer Quintet recorded in 1956 for the Storyville label.

== Reception ==
Professional ratings
Review scores
Source	Rating
Allmusic	4.5/5 stars

The Allmusic review by Scott Yanow stated: "Sims and Brookmeyer are in fine form".

== Track listing ==
All compositions by Bob Brookmeyer except where noted.

1. "The King" (Count Basie) – 4:44
2. "Lullaby of the Leaves" (Bernice Petkere, Joe Young) – 5:16
3. "I Can't Get Started" (Vernon Duke, Ira Gershwin) – 4:40
4. "Snake Eyes" – 4:03
5. "Morning Fun" (Zoot Sims) – 5:07
6. "Whooeeee" – 5:10
7. "Someone to Watch Over Me/My Old Flame" (George Gershwin, Ira Gershwin/Sam Coslow, Arthur Johnston) – 4:16
8. "Box Cars" (Al Cohn) – 5:24

== Personnel ==
- Zoot Sims – tenor saxophone, vocals
- Bob Brookmeyer – valve trombone
- Hank Jones – piano
- Bill Crow – bass
- Jo Jones – drums
