= Superbone =

Duplex trombone with a slide and valves

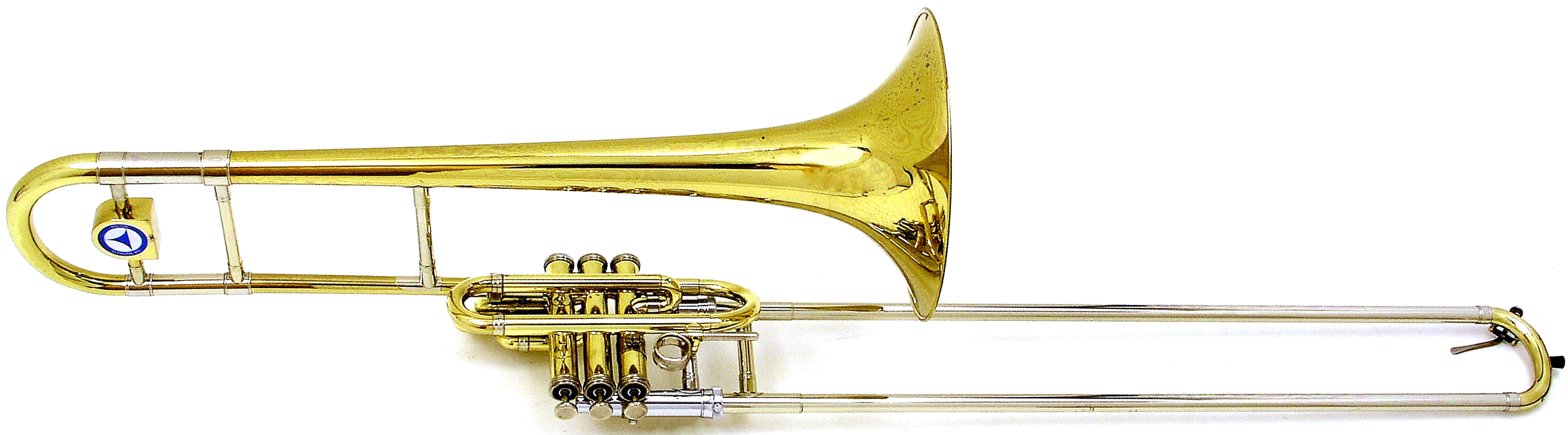
- Superbone

Brass instrument
- Classification: Wind; Brass; Aerophone
- Hornbostel–Sachs classification: 423.2 (Sliding and Valved aerophone sounded by lip movement)
- Developed: Mid-19th century; late 20th century revival

Related instruments
- Firebird; Trumpet; Valide; Valve trombone

Musicians
- Ashley Alexander; Don Ellis; Maynard Ferguson; James Morrison

Builders
- Besson (c. 1860s); Conn (c. 1880–1910); Holton (1974–2004); Schagerl; Wessex

The superbone (sometimes known as the double trombone) is a duplex (or "hybrid") tenor trombone in B♭ that has both a slide, like a regular trombone, and a set of valves like a valve trombone. It is a relatively rare instrument.

== History ==
Trombones that combine both a slide with a set of valves were built as early as the 1860s by the Paris-based manufacturer, Besson. One of the earliest surviving examples was built by Conn in 1884, and closely resembles the modern superbone that appeared in the 1970s. Conn manufactured them through the early 20th century, and a similar instrument with a shorter four-position slide, the valide, was invented by the American jazz musician and machinist Brad Gowans in 1946.

The term "superbone" was coined in the 1970s as a name for the instrument, patented by Larry Ramirez of Holton Musical Instruments, in collaboration with the jazz trumpeter and bandleader, Maynard Ferguson. It is very similar to the early Conn hybrid instruments from the 19th century, with a very narrow bore of 0.484 inches (12.3 mm) and three piston valves. It has a slide lock, which frees the player to operate the valves or the slide with either hand, and was manufactured by Holton as the model TR-395 "Superbone" between 1974 and 2004.

The Holton became a staple instrument for Ferguson, and the American jazz musician and composer Don Ellis in his later career. Ferguson first used the superbone on the recording "Superbone Meets the Bad Man" from his 1974 Chameleon album. Ashley Alexander, another proponent of the instrument, used it on his Secret Love album. Alexander referred to the instrument as a "double trombone" and wrote a method for it, published by Leblanc in 1980.

=== Later developments ===
In the early 2010s the Australian jazz musician James Morrison worked with the Austrian instrument manufacturer Schagerl to create his own version of a superbone, employing a larger 0.525-inch (13.3 mm) bore and three rotary valves operated by the left hand. This arrangement allows the player to use the valves and slide independently or simultaneously. Wessex Tubas also manufacture a superbone with the same larger 0.525-inch (13.3 mm) bore, but with three piston valves similar to the Holton.

== Construction ==
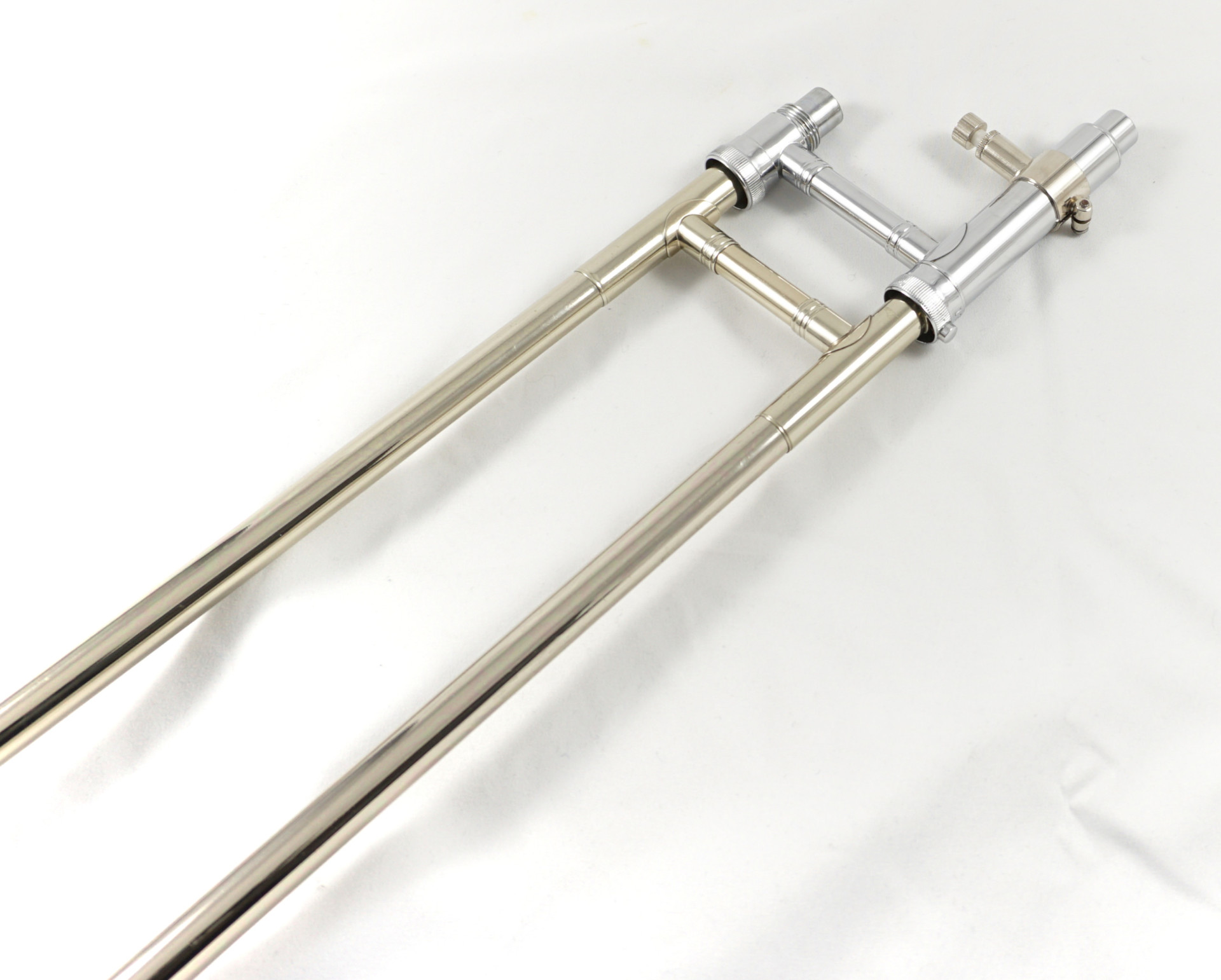
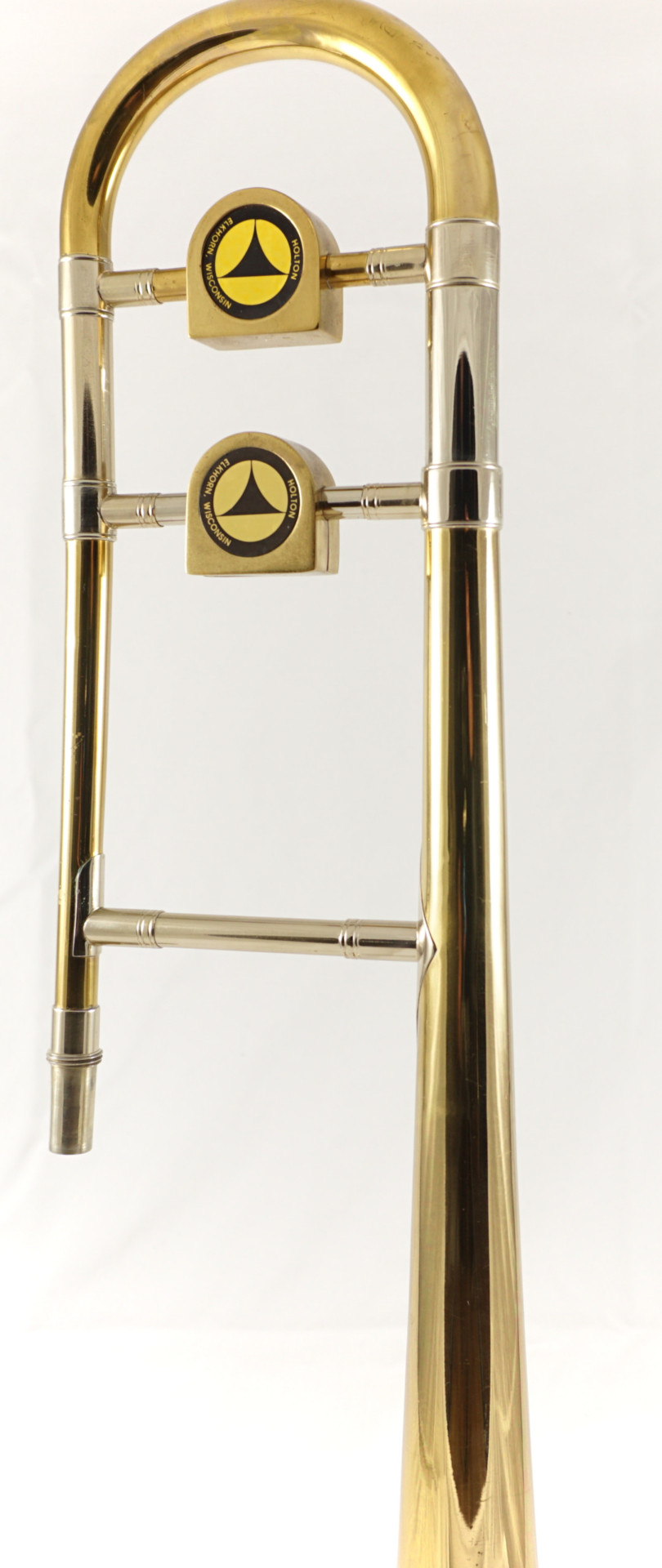
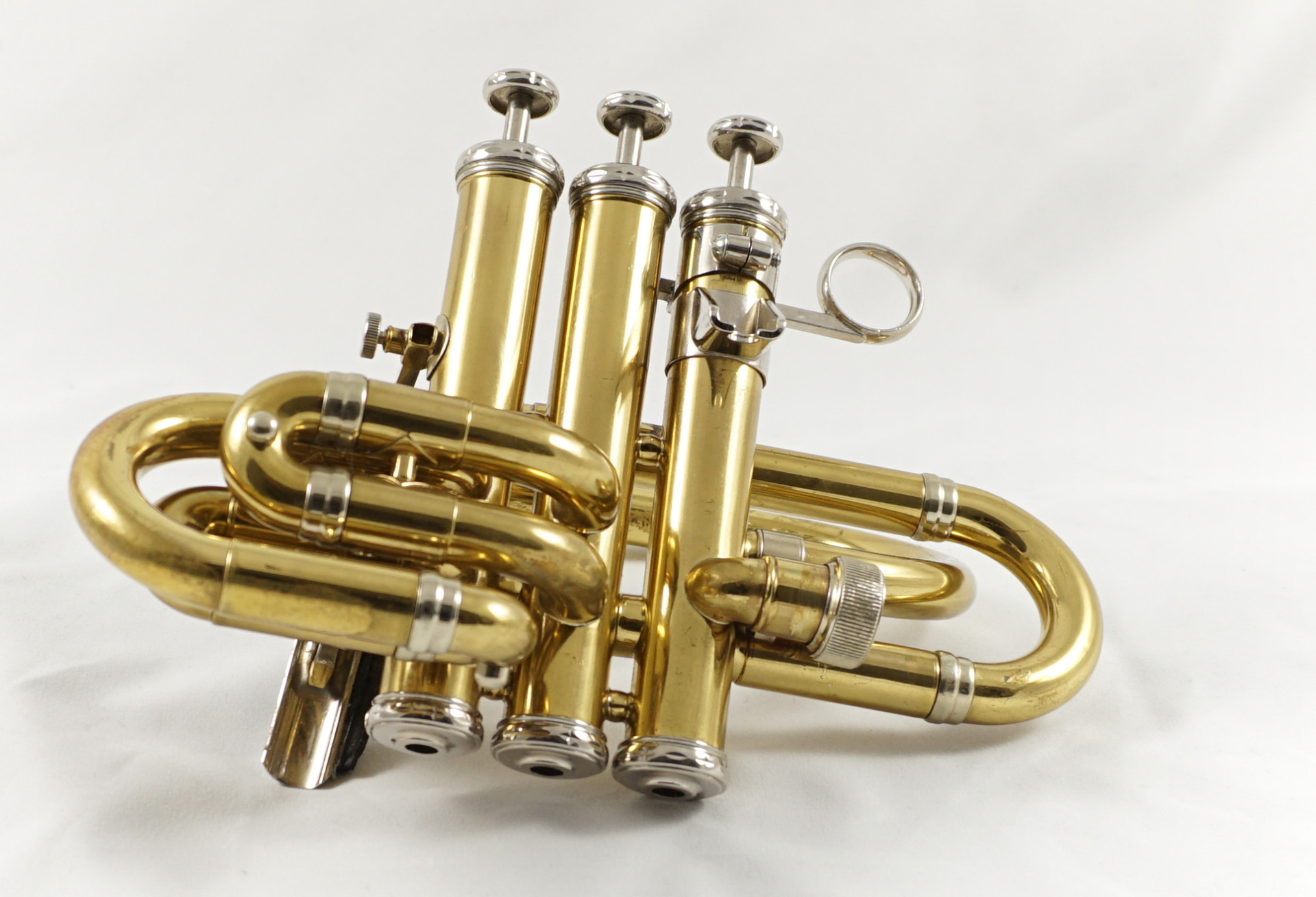
The Holton superbone was built in three parts: slide (left) and bell section (center), which attach to either end of the valve section (right).

Superbones, unlike the valide, have a fully functioning trombone slide with the usual seven positions. The Holton and Wessex instruments are assembled from three detachable sections; the slide and bell sections attach to each end of the valve assembly, built with three piston valves arranged in the same manner as on other three-valved brass instruments. The player grips the valve section with the left hand, which supports the weight of the instrument while the right arm is free to operate the slide. The James Morrison Schagerl model has the two sections of a normal tenor trombone (slide and bell), with three rotary valves and their tubing incorporated in the bell section in a similar manner to F attachments.

Early superbones, and the Holton instrument designed for Ferguson (who was primarily a trumpet player), have very narrow almost trumpet-like bore diameters of less than 0.500 inches (12.7 mm). Later models from Schagerl and Wessex use a larger bore of 0.525 inches (13.3 mm) found more commonly on modern tenor trombones.

== Technique ==
The Superbone can be played as a slide trombone, a valve trombone, or in combination. Using the slide and valves in combination requires the slide positions to be adjusted, just as when using the trigger of an F attachment on a tenor or bass trombone. Using the slide with the first and third valves engaged has the same effect as using an F attachment. Conversely, the valves can be used to provide trills and ornaments for passages played with the slide.

== See also ==
- Firebird, a trumpet with both valves and slide.
- Valide trombone, a similar instrument with a shorter slide of four positions.

== Bibliography ==
- Guion, David M. (2010). A History of the Trombone. Toronto: The Scarecrow Press. ISBN 978-0-8108-7445-9. LCCN 2010000846. OCLC 725775517. OL 24019524M. Wikidata Q111039945.
- Yeo, Douglas (2021). An Illustrated Dictionary for the Modern Trombone, Tuba, and Euphonium Player. Dictionaries for the Modern Musician. Illustrator: Lennie Peterson. Lanham: Rowman & Littlefield. ISBN 978-1-5381-5966-8. LCCN 2021020757. OCLC 1249799159. OL 34132790M. Wikidata Q111040546.
