= Trombone Jazz Samba =

Studio album by Bob Brookmeyer
- Released: 1962
- Recorded: August 21 & 23 and September 14, 1962; New York City
- Genre: Jazz
- Length: 27:59
- Label: Verve; V/V6 8498
- Producer: Creed Taylor

Bob Brookmeyer chronology
| Gloomy Sunday and Other Bright Moments (1961) | Trombone Jazz Samba (1962) | Samba Para Dos (1963) |

Trombone Jazz Samba is an album by jazz trombonist and arranger Bob Brookmeyer featuring bossa nova compositions recorded in 1962 for the Verve label.

== Reception ==
Professional ratings
Review scores
| Source | Rating |
|---|---|
| AllMusic | 4/5 stars |

The AllMusic review by Ken Dryden stated: "Bob Brookmeyer was in the studio just a few months after Stan Getz and Charlie Byrd helped to launch the bossa nova craze in the United States with their hit LP Jazz Samba, but this extremely enjoyable LP didn't come close to matching the success of the earlier album; it may be because the valve trombone is not envisioned as a lush melodic instrument by the average jazz listener in comparison to the tenor sax".

== Track listing ==
1. "Samba de Orfeu" (Luiz Bonfá) - 4:05
2. "Manhã de Carnaval" (Luiz Bonfá) - 4:35
3. "Blues Bossa Nova" (Bob Brookmeyer) - 4:09
4. "Qual E O Po" (Gerson Goncalves, João Roberto Kelly) - 3:30
5. "A Felicidade" (Antônio Carlos Jobim) - 3:12
6. "Main Theme from Mutiny on the Bounty" (Bronisław Kaper) - 2:02
7. "Chora Tua Tristeza" (Oscar Castro-Neves) - 4:11
8. "Colonel Bogey Bossa Nova" (Kenneth J. Alford) - 2:15

== Personnel ==
- Bob Brookmeyer - valve trombone, piano
- Gary McFarland - vibraphone
- Jim Hall, Jimmy Raney - guitar
- Willie Bobo-drums, Carmen Costa- cabasa, Jose Paulo - tambourine
