= Brookmeyer =

Studio album by Bob Brookmeyer
- Released: 1957
- Recorded: September 19 and October 9 & 15, 1956
- Studio: Webster Hall, New York City
- Genre: Jazz
- Label: Vik; LX 1071

Bob Brookmeyer chronology
Jimmy Raney featuring Bob Brookmeyer (1956)	Brookmeyer (1957)	Traditionalism Revisited (1957)

Brookmeyer (also released as Bob Brookmeyer and his Orchestra) is an album by jazz trombonist and arranger Bob Brookmeyer recorded in 1956 for the RCA Records subsidiary Vik label.

== Reception ==
Professional ratings
Review scores
Source	Rating
Allmusic	4/5 stars
The Penguin Guide to Jazz Recordings	3/4 stars

The Allmusic review by Ken Dryden stated "Brookmeyer shines whenever he takes an opportunity to solo, as do his fellow musicians."

== Track listing ==
All compositions by Bob Brookmeyer, except where noted.

1. "Oh Jane Snavely – 3:09
2. "Nature Boy – (eden ahbez) – 7:06
3. "Just You and Me" (Jesse Greer, Raymond Klages) – 2:41
4. "I'm Old Fashioned" (Jerome Kern, Johnny Mercer) – 2:55
5. "Gone Latin" – 3:07
6. "Zing Went the Strings of My Heart" (James F. Hanley) – 6:12
7. "Big City Life" – 4:11
8. "Confusion Blues" – 4:17
9. "Open Country" – 6:12

== Personnel ==
- Bob Brookmeyer – valve trombone
- Al DeRisi (tracks 1, 3 & 9), Joe Ferrante (tracks 1, 3 & 9), Bernie Glow (tracks 1–4, 6 & 9), Louis Oles (tracks 1, 3 & 9), Nick Travis (tracks 2 & 4–8) – trumpet
- Joe Singer – French horn (tracks 1, 3 & 9)
- Al Epstein – bassoon, English horn (tracks 5, 6 & 8)
- Don Butterfield – tuba (tracks 2, 6 & 8)
- Gene Quill – alto saxophone (tracks 5, 6 & 8)
- Al Cohn – tenor saxophone, clarinet
- Ed Wasserman – tenor saxophone (tracks 1, 3 & 9)
- Al Epstein (tracks 1–4 & 9), Sol Schlinger (tracks 1, 3, 5, 6, 8 & 9) – baritone saxophone
- Hank Jones – piano (tracks 1, 3, 5, 6, 8 & 9)
- Milt Hinton (tracks 2, 4 & 5–8), Buddy Jones (tracks 1, 3 & 9) – bass
- Osie Johnson – drums
