= Portrait of the Artist (album) =

Studio album by Bob Brookmeyer
- Released: 1960
- Recorded: March 9 and April 6 & 9, 1959; Atlantic Studios, New York City
- Genre: Jazz
- Label: Atlantic; 1320
- Producer: Nesuhi Ertegun

Bob Brookmeyer chronology
| The Ivory Hunters (1959) | Portrait of the Artist (1960) | Jazz Is a Kick (1960) |

Portrait of the Artist is an album by American jazz trombonist Bob Brookmeyer recorded in 1959 for the Atlantic label.

== Reception ==
Professional ratings
Review scores
| Source | Rating |
|---|---|
| Allmusic | 3/5 stars |
| The Penguin Guide to Jazz Recordings | 3/4 stars |

Allmusic awarded the album 3 stars.

== Track listing ==
All compositions by Bob Brookmeyer except as indicated

1. "Blues Suite: Introduction & First Movement" - 7:18
2. "Blues Suite: Second Movement" - 3:53
3. "Blues Suite: Third Movement" - 4:58
4. "Blues Suite: Fourth Movement" - 5:18
5. "It Don't Mean a Thing (If It Ain't Got That Swing)" (Duke Ellington, Irving Mills) - 6:15
6. "Mellowdrama" - 5:50
7. "Out of Nowhere" (Johnny Green, Edward Heyman) - 4:55
8. "Darn That Dream" (Jimmy Van Heusen, Eddie DeLange) - 4:26
- Recorded in NYC on March 9 (tracks 7 & 8), April 6 (tracks 1, 3 & 4) and April 9 (tracks 2, 5 & 6), 1959

== Personnel ==
- Bob Brookmeyer - valve trombone, piano, arranger
- Ray Copeland (tracks 7 & 8), Bernie Glow (tracks 1, 3 & 4), Marky Markowitz (tracks 7 & 8) Ernie Royal (tracks 1 & 3–6), Nick Travis (tracks 2, 5 & 6) - trumpet
- Frank Rehak - trombone
- John Barrows (tracks 2 & 5–8), Earl Chapin (tracks 1, 3 & 4) - French horn
- Bill Barber (tracks 2 & 5–8), Don Butterfield (tracks 1, 3 & 4) - tuba
- Danny Bank - flute, clarinet, baritone saxophone (tracks 2, 5 & 6)
- Gene Quill - alto saxophone, clarinet
- Al Cohn - tenor saxophone (tracks 1, 3 & 4)
- Gene Allen - baritone saxophone, tenor saxophone (tracks 7 & 8)
- George Duvivier - bass
- Charlie Persip - drums
