= The Blues Hot and Cold =

Studio album by The Bob Brookmeyer Quartet
- Released: 1960
- Recorded: June 16, 1960; Los Angeles, CA
- Genre: Jazz
- Label: Verve; MGV 8385
- Producer: Norman Granz

Bob Brookmeyer chronology
Jazz Is a Kick (1960)	The Blues Hot and Cold (1960)	7 x Wilder (1961)

The Blues Hot and Cold is an album by jazz trombonist and arranger Bob Brookmeyer recorded in 1960 for the Verve label.

== Reception ==
Professional ratings
Review scores
Source	Rating
Allmusic	4/5 stars
DownBeat	4.5/5 stars

The Allmusic review by Ken Dryden stated "Bob Brookmeyer is thought of as a cool jazz stylist, though the valve trombonist throws everyone a curve with these 1960 small group dates. Accompanied by pianist Jimmy Rowles, bassist Buddy Clark, and drummer Mel Lewis, Brookmeyer delves into music from the swing era, utilizing a mute throughout most of the album, something he doesn't use all that often".

Don De Micheal reviewed the album for Downbeat and assigned four and a half stars. He wrote, "This is the best record Brookmeyer has made".

== Track listing ==
All compositions by Bob Brookmeyer except as indicated

1. "On the Sunny Side of the Street" (Jimmy McHugh, Dorothy Fields) - 6:04
2. "Stoppin' at the Savoy" - 5:54
3. "Languid Blues" - 7:21
4. "I Got Rhythm" (George Gershwin, Ira Gershwin) - 4:53
5. "Smoke Gets in Your Eyes" (Jerome Kern, Otto Harbach) - 5:48
6. "Hot and Cold Blues" - 7:57

== Personnel ==
- Bob Brookmeyer - valve trombone
- Jimmy Rowles - piano
- Buddy Clark - bass
- Mel Lewis - drums
