= Bob Brookmeyer Quartet =

1954 studio album by Bob Brookmeyer Quartet

Studio album by Bob Brookmeyer Quartet featuring John Williams and Red Mitchell
- Released: 1954
- Recorded: July 5 & 7, 1954
- Studio: Van Gelder Studio, Hackensack, New Jersey
- Genre: Jazz
- Length: 23:55
- Label: Pacific Jazz; PJ LP-16
- Producer: Dick Bock

Bob Brookmeyer chronology
Storyville Presents Bob Brookmeyer featuring Al Cohn (1954)	Bob Brookmeyer Quartet (1954)	Bob Brookmeyer Plays Bob Brookmeyer and Some Others (1955)

Professional ratings
Review scores
Source	Rating
Allmusic	3/5 stars

Bob Brookmeyer Quartet is an album by jazz trombonist and composer Bob Brookmeyer recorded in 1954 and originally released on the Pacific Jazz label as a 10-inch LP. The material is a mix of standards and originals. The Billboard review commented: "The music is in the modern groove, moody and interesting."

== Track listing ==
All compositions by Bob Brookmeyer, except where noted.

1. "Liberty Belle" – 2:47
2. "Have You Met Miss Jones?" (Richard Rodgers, Lorenz Hart) – 3:22
3. "Traditional Blues" (Traditional) – 2:34
4. "Isn't It Romantic?" (Rodgers, Hart) – 2:36
5. "Doe Eyes" (Red Mitchell) – 3:18
6. "Red Devil" (Mitchell) – 3:09
7. "Body and Soul" (Johnny Green, Edward Heyman, Robert Sour, Frank Eyton) – 3:19
8. "Last Chance" – 2:50
- Recorded at Van Gelder Studio in Hackensack, New Jersey on July 5, 1954 (tracks 1–3) and July 7, 1954 (tracks 4–8)

== Personnel ==
- Bob Brookmeyer - valve trombone
- John Williams – piano
- Bill Anthony (tracks 1–3), Red Mitchell (tracks 4–8) – bass
- Frank Isola – drums
