= Jazz Is a Kick =

Studio album by Bob Brookmeyer
- Released: 1960
- Recorded: May 9 & 16, 1960; New York City
- Genre: Jazz
- Length: 36:27
- Label: Mercury; MG 20600/60600
- Producer: Chuck Darwin

Bob Brookmeyer chronology
Portrait of the Artist (1960)	Jazz Is a Kick (1960)	The Blues Hot and Cold (1960)

Jazz Is a Kick is an album by jazz trombonist and arranger Bob Brookmeyer recorded in 1960 for the Mercury label.

== Reception ==
Professional ratings
Review scores
Source	Rating
Allmusic	2.5/5 stars

The Allmusic review by Scott Yanow stated: "This interesting LP matches together valve trombonist Bob Brookmeyer with the slide trombone of Curtis Fuller. ...Brookmeyer and Fuller display contrasting styles while blending together quite well on the ensemble".

== Track listing ==
All compositions by Bob Brookmeyer except as indicated

1. "Air Conditioned" - 4:53
2. "Exactly Like You" (Jimmy McHugh, Dorothy Fields) - 4:33
3. "This Can't Be Love" (Richard Rodgers, Lorenz Hart) - 3:21
4. "Green Stamps" - 4:33
5. "The Things I Love" (Harold Barlow, Lew Harris) - 4:39
6. "Only When You're Near" (Chuck Darwin, P. Girard) - 3:30
7. "You're My Everything" (Harry Warren, Joe Young, Mort Dixon) - 3:17
8. "Cooperation" (Ford Knox) - 7:30

== Personnel ==
- Bob Brookmeyer - valve trombone
- Curtis Fuller - trombone
- Thad Jones, Joe Newman - trumpet (tracks 1–3 & 5)
- Wynton Kelly (tracks 4 & 6–8) - piano, Hank Jones (tracks 1–3 & 5)
- Paul Chambers (tracks 4 & 6–8), Eddie Jones (tracks 1–3 & 5) - bass
- Paul Motian (tracks 4 & 6–8), Charlie Persip (tracks 1–3 & 5) - drums
