= Gloomy Sunday and Other Bright Moments =

Studio album by The Bob Brookmeyer Orchestra
- Released: 1961
- Recorded: November 6, 7 & 8, 1961; New York City
- Genre: Jazz
- Label: Verve; V/V6 8455
- Producer: Creed Taylor

Bob Brookmeyer chronology
Recorded Fall 1961 (1961)	Gloomy Sunday and Other Bright Moments (1961)	Trombone Jazz Samba (1961)

Gloomy Sunday and Other Bright Moments is an album by jazz trombonist and arranger Bob Brookmeyer recorded in 1961 for the Verve label. Brookmeyer said: "I consider it my pride and joy. I took many creative risks here, most based on the heels of working with Bill [Finegan]. I used woodwinds, double reeds and other instrument configurations I hadn't used before. My attitude toward the orchestration was really a big step forward in my development".

== Reception ==
Professional ratings
Review scores
Source	Rating
AllMusic	4/5 stars

AllMusic awarded the album 4 stars.

== Track listing ==
1. "Caravan" (Juan Tizol, Duke Ellington, Irving Mills) - 3:40
2. "Why Are You Blue" (Gary McFarland) - 4:22
3. "Some of My Best Friends" (Al Cohn) - 5:10
4. "Gloomy Sunday" (Rezső Seress) - 5:40
5. "Ho Hum" (Bob Brookmeyer) - 4:40
6. "Detour Ahead" (Herb Ellis, Johnny Frigo, Lou Carter) - 4:30
7. "Days Gone By; Oh My!" (Gary McFarland) - 5:00
8. "Where, Oh Where" (Cole Porter) - 3:45

== Personnel ==
- Bob Brookmeyer - valve trombone
- Bernie Glow, Joe Newman (tracks 3 & 4), Doc Severinsen, Clark Terry, Nick Travis (tracks 1, 2 & 5–8) - trumpet
- Wayne Andre, Billy Byers (tracks 1, 3, 4, 6 & 8), Bill Elton (tracks 2, 5 & 7), Alan Raph - trombone
- Wally Kane - bassoon (tracks 4 & 8)
- Eddie Caine - alto saxophone, flute
- Phil Woods - alto saxophone, clarinet (tracks 2-5 & 7)
- Gene Quill (track 1), Eddie Wasserman (tracks 2 & 4) - alto saxophone
- Phil Bodner - tenor saxophone, oboe, English horn
- Al Cohn - tenor saxophone (tracks 1–3, 5 & 7)
- Gene Allen - baritone saxophone, bass clarinet
- Eddie Costa - vibraphone, percussion
- Hank Jones - piano
- George Duvivier - bass
- Mel Lewis - drums
- Bob Brookmeyer (tracks 5–8), Ralph Burns (track 1), Al Cohn (track 3), Gary McFarland (track 2), Eddie Sauter (track 4) - arranger
