= Recorded Fall 1961 =

Studio album by Bob Brookmeyer, Stan Getz
- Released: 1961
- Recorded: September 12–13, 1961
- Venue: Nola Recording Studio, New York City, NY
- Genre: Jazz
- Length: 42:59
- Label: Verve
- Producer: Creed Taylor

Bob Brookmeyer chronology
7 x Wilder (1961)	Recorded Fall 1961 (1961)	Gloomy Sunday and Other Bright Moments (1962)

Stan Getz chronology
Focus (1961)	Recorded Fall 1961 (1961)	Big Band Bossa Nova (1962)

Recorded Fall 1961 is a 1961 studio album by American jazz musicians Bob Brookmeyer and Stan Getz.

== Reception ==
The Allmusic review by Scott Yanow awarded the album four and a half stars and stated: "As usual the cool-toned tenor blends in very well with the valve trombonist and, backed by a fine rhythm section...This little-known session is often quite memorable".

In Downbeat, Ira Gitler gave the record a perfect five-star rating and noted that the album marked two occasions: "the first recording by Getz since his return to the United States [and] a reunion with Brookmeyer, his partner of the mid-’50s."

Regarding their performances, Gitler writes "Getz and Brookmeyer are mature players, and everything they do on this record is in perfect balance... the most important factor in the success of this set is the ease with which these men communicate their thoughts and feelings to the audience. It seems to flow out and by the same token, right in."

Professional ratings
Review scores
Source	Rating
Allmusic	4.5/5 stars
Down Beat	5/5 stars
The Penguin Guide to Jazz Recordings	4/4 stars

== Track listing ==
1. "Minuet Circa '61" (Bob Brookmeyer) - 10:38
2. "Who Could Care?" (Brookmeyer) - 4:46
3. "Nice Work If You Can Get It" (George Gershwin, Ira Gershwin) - 5:58
4. "Thump, Thump, Thump" (Brookmeyer) - 6:52
5. "A Nightingale Sang in Berkeley Square" (Eric Maschwitz, Manning Sherwin) - 6:59
6. "Love Jumped Out" (Buck Clayton) - 7:46

== Personnel ==
- Bob Brookmeyer - valve trombone
- Stan Getz - tenor saxophone
- Steve Kuhn - piano
- John Neves - double bass
- Roy Haynes - drums

Production

- Nat Hentoff - liner notes
- Loren Schoenberg
- Tommy Nola - engineer
- Creed Taylor - producer
