= Tonite's Music Today =

Studio album by Zoot Sims and Bob Brookmeyer
- Released: 1956
- Recorded: January 31, 1956; New York City
- Genre: Jazz
- Length: 35:18
- Label: Storyville; STLP 907
- Producer: George Wein

Bob Brookmeyer chronology
The Dual Role of Bob Brookmeyer (1954–55)	Tonite's Music Today (1956)	Whooeeee (1956)

Zoot Sims chronology
From A to...Z (1956)	Tonite's Music Today (1956)	Whooeeee (1956)

Tonite's Music Today is an album by saxophonist Zoot Sims and trombonist Bob Brookmeyer recorded in 1956 for the Storyville label.

== Reception ==
Professional ratings
Review scores
Source	Rating
Allmusic	4.5/5 stars

The Allmusic review by Scott Yanow described the album featuring "colorful jammed ensembles and hard-swinging yet cool-toned solos that owe as much to the swing tradition as to the innovations of bebop".

== Track listing ==
1. "Mr. Moon" (Steve Allen) – 4:56
2. "I Hear a Rhapsody" (Jack Baker, George Fragos, Dick Gasparre) – 2:27
3. "The Chant" (Gerry Mulligan) – 4:27
4. "Blues" (Traditional) – 5:39
5. "Zoot's Tune" (Zoot Sims) – 4:42
6. "How Long Has This Been Going On?" (George Gershwin, Ira Gershwin) – 4:51
7. "Bobby's Tune" (Bob Brookmeyer) – 3:23
8. "Blue Skies" (Irving Berlin) – 4:53

== Personnel ==
- Zoot Sims – tenor saxophone, vocals
- Bob Brookmeyer – valve trombone
- Hank Jones – piano
- Wyatt Reuther – bass
- Gus Johnson – drums
