= 7 x Wilder =

Studio album by The Bob Brookmeyer 4
- Released: 1961
- Recorded: June 29, 1961; New York City
- Genre: Jazz
- Length: 34:48
- Label: Verve; V/V6 8413
- Producer: Creed Taylor

Bob Brookmeyer chronology
The Blues Hot and Cold (1960)	7 x Wilder (1961)	Recorded Fall 1961 (1961)

7 x Wilder is an album by jazz trombonist and arranger Bob Brookmeyer featuring compositions by Alec Wilder recorded in 1961 for the Verve label.

== Reception ==
Professional ratings
Review scores
Source	Rating
Allmusic	4/5 stars

The Allmusic review by Ken Dryden stated "It shouldn't be surprising that Hall's softly speaking guitar is the perfect complement to Brookmeyer's almost vocal valve trombone, since the two meshed so well together while working in the Jimmy Giuffre Trio just a few years earlier". On All About Jazz, C. Andrew Hovan noted "7 x Wilder is Brookmeyer at his finest".

== Track listing ==
All compositions by Alec Wilder except as indicated

1. "While We're Young" (Alec Wilder, Morty Palitz, William Engvick) – 6:16
2. "That's the Way It Goes" (Wilder, Sid Robin) – 4:43
3. "The Wrong Blues" (Wilder, Engvick) – 4:38
4. "It's So Peaceful in the Country" – 4:04
5. "Blues for Alec" (Bob Brookmeyer) – 6:10
6. "I'll Be Around" – 4:30
7. "Who Can I Turn To" (Wilder, Engvick) – 4:27

== Personnel ==
- Bob Brookmeyer – valve trombone, piano
- Jim Hall – guitar
- Bill Crow – bass
- Mel Lewis – drums
