= Bernie Glow =

American jazz trumpeter (1926–1982)

Bernie Glow (February 6, 1926 – May 8, 1982) was an American trumpet player who specialized in jazz and commercial lead trumpet from the 1940s to 1970s. He was born Bernard Abraham Glatzer on Feb 6 1926 in New York to Gustav (Gus) and Frances (Faye) Glatzer. He was known as Bernie Glow by age 18, as shown on his amended 1944 draft card, which lists his occupation at “musician free-lance.”

Glow's early career was on the road with Artie Shaw, Woody Herman and others during the last years of the big-band era. The majority of his years were spent as a first-rate New York City studio musician, where he worked with Miles Davis and Frank Sinatra, and did thousands of radio and television recording sessions.

== Training ==
At The High School of Music & Art, during the Second World War, Bernie played in bands with future notables Stan Getz, Tiny Khan, Shorty Rogers and George Wallington.

Other than the influence of symphonic trumpet masters and his peers, Glow was influenced early on by performances of Snooky Young with the Jimmie Lunceford band, and Billy Butterfield with Benny Goodman.

== Early career 1942–1949 ==
Just sixteen and out of high school, Glow spent a year on the road with the Richard Himber Orchestra. Two years later he was with Xavier Cugat and then Raymond Scott on CBS radio. In 1945 he was playing lead trumpet with the Artie Shaw band. Following that stint, he was with Boyd Raeburn.

In 1949, at 23, he retired from the road after more than a year with Woody Herman and his famous "Second Herd".

== NYC freelance years 1949–1952 ==
In this middle period Glow worked as a trumpet player in a wide variety of situations. He played in big bands, Latin bands and dance orchestras. He performed around Manhattan in theaters, dance halls, night clubs and on the radio.

== Studio years 1950s–1970s ==
Beginning in 1953 Bernie Glow was a first-call trumpet player and played on thousands of recording sessions. There was great variety in the kinds of music being recorded; One day he would play a radio commercial for Pepsi, and the next he would record an album with Frank Sinatra or Ella Fitzgerald. Many of these studio big-band sessions were led by leading composer/arrangers Nelson Riddle, Quincy Jones and Oliver Nelson. He played on the seminal Miles Davis and Gil Evans collaborations that produced the masterpiece albums Miles Ahead (1957), Porgy and Bess (1958), Sketches of Spain (1959), and Quiet Nights (1962). Glow also spent time as a member of the NBC and CBS staff orchestras.

He played a Bach Stradivarius Bb 72* (lightweight) trumpet.

== Death ==
He died of a blood disorder in Manhasset at the age of 56.

== Discography ==
=== As sideman ===
With Manny Albam

- The Drum Suite (RCA Victor, 1956) with Ernie Wilkins
- Jazz Goes to the Movies (Impulse!, 1964)

With Tony Bennett

- Tony Bennett at Carnegie Hall (Columbia, 1962)

With George Benson

- The Other Side of Abbey Road (CTI, 1969)

With Bob Brookmeyer

- Brookmeyer (Vik, 1956)
- Portrait of the Artist (Atlantic, 1960)
- Gloomy Sunday and Other Bright Moments (Verve, 1961)

With Ruth Brown

- Late Date with Ruth Brown (Atlantic, 1959)

With Kenny Burrell

- Blues - The Common Ground (Verve, 1968)
- Night Song (Verve, 1969)

With Candido Camero

- Beautiful (Blue Note, 1970)

With Betty Carter

- Social Call (Columbia, 1956 - released 1980)

With Al Cohn

- Four Brass One Tenor (RCA Victor, 1955)
- Son of Drum Suite (RCA Victor, 1960)

With Hank Crawford

- Mr. Blues Plays Lady Soul (Atlantic, 1969)
- Wildflower (Kudu, 1973)

With Miles Davis and Gil Evans

- Miles Ahead (Columbia, 1957)
- Porgy and Bess (Columbia, 1958)
- Sketches of Spain (Columbia, 1960)

With Bill Evans

- Symbiosis (MPS, 1974)

With Gil Evans

- The Individualism of Gil Evans (Verve, 1964)

With Art Farmer

- The Aztec Suite (United Artists, 1959)
- Listen to Art Farmer and the Orchestra (Mercury, 1962)

With Maynard Ferguson

- The Blues Roar (Mainstream, 1965)
- Primal Scream (Columbia, 1976)
- Conquistador (Columbia, 1977)

With Aretha Franklin

- Aretha Now (Atlantic, 1968)
- Soul '69 (Atlantic, 1969)

With Curtis Fuller

- Cabin in the Sky (Impulse!, 1962)

With Dizzy Gillespie

- Perceptions (Verve, 1961)

With Jimmy Giuffre

- The Music Man (Atlantic, 1958)

With Benny Golson

- Take a Number from 1 to 10 (Argo, 1961)

With Urbie Green

- Urbie Green's Big Beautiful Band (Project 3, 1974)

With Eddie Harris

- Silver Cycles (Atlantic, 1968)

With Coleman Hawkins

- The Hawk in Hi Fi (RCA Victor, 1956)

With Billie Holiday

- Lady in Satin (Columbia, 1958)

With Freddie Hubbard

- Windjammer (Columbia, 1976)

With Milt Jackson

- Big Bags (Riverside, 1962)

With Al Kooper

- You Never Know Who Your Friends Are (Columbia, 1969)

With John Lewis

- Odds Against Tomorrow (Soundtrack) (United Artists, 1959)
- The Golden Striker (Atlantic, 1960)

With Mundell Lowe

- Satan in High Heels (soundtrack) (Charlie Parker, 1961)

With Herbie Mann

- Salute to the Flute (Epic, 1957)

With Gary McFarland

- The Jazz Version of "How to Succeed in Business without Really Trying" (Verve, 1962)
- Profiles (Impulse!, 1966)

With Blue Mitchell

- Smooth as the Wind (Riverside, 1961)

With the Modern Jazz Quartet

- Jazz Dialogue (Atlantic, 1965)

With Wes Montgomery

- California Dreaming (Verve, 1966)

With Mark Murphy

- Rah! (Riverside, 1961)

With Oliver Nelson

- Impressions of Phaedra (United Artists Jazz, 1962)

With Joe Newman

- Salute to Satch (RCA Victor, 1956)

With Laura Nyro

- Eli and the Thirteenth Confession (Columbia, 1968)

With Anita O'Day

- All the Sad Young Men (Verve, 1962)

With Chico O'Farrill

- Nine Flags (Impulse!, 1966)

With Tito Puente

- Dance Mania (RCA, 1958)

With Nelson Riddle

- Phil Silvers and Swinging Brass (Columbia, 1957)

With Jimmy Smith

- The Cat (Verve, 1964)

With Rex Stewart and Cootie Williams

- Porgy & Bess Revisited (Warner Bros., 1959)

With Sarah Vaughan

- In the Land of Hi-Fi (EmArcy, 1955)

With Walter Wanderley

- Moondreams (A&M/CTI, 1969)

With Dinah Washington

- The Swingin' Miss "D" (EmArcy, 1956)

With Doc Severinsen- "The Big Band's Back in Town" -Command records- 1962 With Van McCoy & the Soul City Symphony backing The Stylistics- Trumpet solos on "Do the Hustle" & "I Can't Give You Anything (But My Love)"- 1975
