= Traditionalism Revisited =

Studio album by Bob Brookmeyer
- Released: 1957
- Recorded: July 13 & 16, 1957; Coastal Studios, NYC
- Genre: Jazz
- Length: 49:35 CD reissue with bonus tracks
- Label: World Pacific; PJ 1233
- Producer: Richard Bock

Bob Brookmeyer chronology
Brookmeyer (1956)	Traditionalism Revisited (1957)	Jazz Concerto Grosso (1957)

Traditionalism Revisited is an album by jazz trombonist and pianist Bob Brookmeyer featuring popular music of the 1920s and 1930s recorded in 1957 for the World Pacific label.

== Reception ==
Professional ratings
Review scores
Source	Rating
Allmusic	4/5 stars
Disc	4/5 stars
The Penguin Guide to Jazz Recordings	3.5/4 stars

The Allmusic review by Scott Yanow stated "While these selections have occasionally been revived by Dixieland and swing bands, Brookmeyer and his group use harmonies that were modern for the 1950s... Because the musicians have a respect for the older styles, they extend rather than break the tradition; the results are quite enjoyable". On All About Jazz, Jack Bowers stated "it’s good to hear Brookmeyer, one of a handful of masters on his axe, and especially the versatile Giuffre, whose more recent work lies in the realm of the avant–garde, playing sturdy straight–ahead Jazz with a well–defined kick".

== Track listing ==
1. "Louisiana" (Andy Razaf, Bob Schafer, J. C. Johnson) - 5:26
2. "Santa Claus Blues" (Charley Straight, Gus Kahn) - 5:42
3. "Truckin'" (Rube Bloom, Ted Koehler) - 7:27 SpotifyRdio
4. "Some Sweet Day" (Ed Rose, Tony Jackson, Abe Olman) - 4:46
5. "Sweet Like This" (Dave Nelson, King Oliver) - 4:05
6. "Don't Be That Way" (Benny Goodman, Mitchell Parish, Edgar Sampson) - 4:58
7. "Honeysuckle Rose" (Razaf, Fats Waller) - 6:05
8. "Slow Freight" (Bob Brookmeyer) - 5:47 Bonus track on CD reissue
9. "The Sheik of Araby" (Harry B. Smith, Francis Wheeler) - 5:01 Bonus track on CD reissue

== Personnel ==
- Bob Brookmeyer - valve trombone, piano
- Jimmy Giuffre - clarinet, tenor saxophone, baritone saxophone
- Jim Hall - guitar
- Joe Benjamin (tracks 1, 2, 4–6 & 9), Ralph Peña (tracks 3, 7 & 8) - bass
- Dave Bailey - drums
