= Pieces of Eight: Live at UCLA =

Live album by Don Ellis
- Released: 2006
- Recorded: April 8, 1967 at University of California, Los Angeles
- Genre: Jazz
- Length: 93:37
- Label: Wounded Bird; WOU 6000
- Producer: Terry Wachsmuth

Don Ellis chronology
| Don Ellis Live at Montreux (1978) | Pieces of Eight: Live at UCLA (2006) | Don Ellis Live in India (2010) |

Pieces of Eight: Live at UCLA is a live double CD by trumpeter/bandleader Don Ellis' Octet recorded in 1967 and released on the Wounded Bird label in 2006.

== Reception ==
Professional ratings
Review scores
| Source | Rating |
|---|---|
| Allmusic | 4/5 stars |

Rob Theakston of Allmusic said "The highlights are no doubt Ellis' fascination with difficult rhythmic combinations and manic fluctuations of odd time signatures and his band, surprisingly, performs most of the material with great fluidity. There's also a surprising amount of microtonality from the players as well. Fans of Ellis' work will no doubt revel in these compositions and what is essentially a "new" recording from a truly groundbreaking composer". On All About Jazz, Jim Santella observed "While unusual meters dot the session, Ellis gives a well rounded performance that combines creative soloing and pure musical timbres with superior writing. His sidemen were always inspired. Pieces Of Eight comes highly recommended for its unique character and for its dedication to the timeless principles of great music"

== Track listing ==
All compositions by Don Ellis except as indicated

Disc One:

1. "Slippin' 'N' Slidin'" - 6:57
2. "Sadness Shouldn't Go so Deep" - 3:54
3. "Bali Dancer" - 5:31
4. "With Respect to Coltrane" (Tom Scott) - 5:05
5. "Pete's 7" - 6:29
6. "Let's Go to Sleep" - 7:16
7. "Blues for Hari" (Scott) - 9:08

Disc Two:

1. "Milestones" (Miles Davis) - 9:56
2. "It's a Snap" - 2:18
3. "I Love Us" - 5:47
4. "The Squeeze" - 5:22
5. "Lush Life" (Billy Strayhorn) - 7:29
6. "Turk's Works" (Arif Mardin) - 18:25

== Personnel ==
- Don Ellis - trumpet, arranger
- Tom Scott – alto saxophone, tenor saxophone, clarinet, arranger
- Dave Wells – trombone
- Dave Mackay – piano
- Ray Neopolitan – bass
- Steve Bohannon – drums
- Alan Estes - timbales, percussion
- Chino Valdes - congas, bongos
