= Yoan Leviev =

Bulgarian Artist, painter, and creator of monumental works

Yoan Isakov Leviev (Bulgarian: Йоан Левиев) (October 31, 1934 in Plovdiv, Bulgaria – March 11, 1994 in Plovdiv, Bulgaria) was a Bulgarian artist, painter, and creator of monumental artworks such as large-scale mosaics and murals.

== Art Education ==
He completed school in 1952 at the Iliyana Dimitrova School in Plovdiv. In 1958, he graduated in monumental and decorative painting at the National Art Academy in Sofia in the class of Professor Georgi Bogdanov. From 1960 onwards, he regularly took part in exhibitions in Plovdiv and collective exhibitions by the Union of Bulgarian Artists, of which he became a member in 1961. The same year, he spent two months in Italy.

== Art Career ==
Leviev was a member of the innovative Plovdiv School of the 1960s. This group also included Encho Pironkov, George Bozhilov, Dimitar Kirov, Kolyo Vitkowski, and Hristo Stefanov, known as the "April Generation".

Leviev's work encompasses easel and monumental painting, mural painting, decorative panels, and mosaics. From 1970 onwards, he held numerous solo exhibitions in Plovdiv, Sofia, Varna and abroad, including in Warsaw, Prague and Los Angeles.

Leviev took part in collective exhibitions in youth biennales in Paris (1961 and 1963). His first solo exhibition was in Sofia in 1973, at the Union of Bulgarian Artists Gallery at 6 Shipka Street.

Other solo exhibitions included those in 1975 and 1981 at the Autumn Art Exhibitions in the Old Town, Plovdiv, at the gallery at 125 Rakovski Street in Sofia in 1979. A jubilee exhibition of paintings and drawings was held in 1984 in the Old Town, Plovdiv, and shown again in 1985 at the Shipka Six Gallery in Sofia.

The year 1986 saw an exhibition of Leviev's work at galleries in Los Angeles, USA. Other exhibitions in the US were held in 1989 ("Watercolours from Bulgaria", and in 1991 at the Lori Kaye Gallery, Garden Grove, CA (Orange County), featuring a solo exhibition with 20 works from the "Song of Solomon" series.

There was a solo exhibition at the Serdica Gallery in Sofia in May 1991.

Leviev visited Mexico in 1977, taking part in an exhibition and meeting prominent Mexican artists. In 1984, he spent two months in Paris on a grant from the Union of Bulgarian Artists, at the Cité internationale des arts.

== Earlier Career ==
In addition, in his earlier career, Leviev did scenography for opera productions, including "Antigone 43" by Lyubomir Pipkov, "July Night" and "Knight" by Parashkev Hadzhiev, "Pagliacci" by Ruggiero Leoncavallo, and the ballet "Love Magic" by Manuel de Falla, and "The Fair in Plovdiv" by Jules Levy.

There are artworks by Yoan Leviev, currently owned by the National Art Gallery, the Sofia City Art Gallery, galleries elsewhere in Bulgaria and overseas, and in private collections.

The Ivan Vazov National Library in Plovdiv has a collection of his monumental works. His work is also portrayed at the National Art Gallery, the Art Gallery in Bourgas, in Veliko Turnovo, and in Hilversum, the Netherlands.

In Sofia, there are mosaics by Leviev in the National History Museum, in the National Palace of Culture, and in the headquarters of the Bulgarian Ministry of Foreign Affairs, and in Plovdiv, at the Drama Theatre and the Public Library. Works on public view include a mosaic with stylised roses in the town square of Karlovo.

== Art Legacy ==
Posthumous exhibitions of the work of Yoan Leviev have included a retrospective in 1994 at Sofia City Art Gallery and in Plovdiv, a 1999 exhibition marking the 65th anniversary of his birth and the five years since his death, 2004's “Paintings in Private”, a showing of erotic works that was being displayed in public for the first time, a 2005 exhibition of large-format works at the Debut Gallery at the Iliya Petrov National School of Fine Arts in Sofia and a 2009 exhibition of watercolours at the Argos Gallery.

In 2010, the exhibition Завръщането (The Return), 14 works (paintings and watercolours) and 30 erotic drawings, dating from between 1982 and 1989, that had been part of exhibitions in the United States several years before. Most of the works in this exhibition belonged to the same cycle, “Song of Solomon”. The exhibition The Return was first staged in the Sofia Press Gallery in the Bulgarian capital and was shown later at the City Art Gallery in Plovdiv.

In Plovdiv, a 20-metre mural by Yoan Leviev was destroyed during the renovation of the Boris Christoff House of Culture. After the renovation was complete, an enlarged photograph of the mural was put in its place.

For his work, Leviev received numerous awards, including from Plovdiv Municipality in 1968 and 1971, the state honour Order of Saints Kiril and Metodii First Class (1970), the Union of Bulgarian Artists Award for Painting (1970, 1971, and 1978), and for Monumental Art (1979, 1983).

== Relatives ==
Well-known jazz musician Milcho Leviev was his brother.

== Bibliography ==
- Чулова-Маркова, Д., "Непознатият Йоан Левиев. Живот и творчество", С., 2007
- Чулова-Маркова, Д., „Стенописната украса на увеселителни заведения в град Пловдив като легитимация на творческа общност сред пловдивската група на художниците”. Сборник „Кафене Европа”, 2007
- Чулова-Маркова, Д.,Измерения на историческа памет в две сграфитни пана от Йоан Левиев на фасадата на Исторически музей в град Перущица", сб. „Перущица гласове от миналото, настоящето и бъдещето”, т.7, 2006, изд. ИМН, Пловдив.
- Чулова-Маркова, Д.,“История и митология в творчеството на пловдивските художници монументалисти през 60-те-80-те години на ХХ век”, сп. “Минало”, кн.3/4, 2004 г.
- Чулова-Маркова, Д.,„Йоан Левиев – споделената стихия”, в. „Култура”, бр. 40/41 от 29.10. 2004 г.
- Чулова-Маркова, Д.,“Непознатият Йоан Левиев (1934-1994) – монументалистът на страниците на книгата”, сп. “Проблеми на изкуството” 2001 г., кн.3
