= The Ivory Hunters =

Studio album by Bob Brookmeyer & Bill Evans
- Released: End of September 1959
- Recorded: March 12, 1959
- Studio: Olmsted Sound Studios, New York City
- Genre: Jazz
- Length: 42:34
- Label: United Artists

Bob Brookmeyer chronology
Stretching Out (1958)	The Ivory Hunters (1959)	Portrait of the Artist (1960)

Bill Evans chronology
On Green Dolphin Street (1959)	The Ivory Hunters (1959)	Portrait in Jazz (1959)

The Ivory Hunters (subtitled Double Barrelled Piano) is an album by jazz pianists Bob Brookmeyer and Bill Evans, originally released on the United Artists label, featuring Evans and Brookmeyer with Percy Heath, and Connie Kay, recorded in 1959.

Brookmeyer was known primarily as a trombonist who occasionally doubled on piano; this was his only album playing piano exclusively.

== Reception ==
The Allmusic review by Michael G. Nastos states: "Pairing a rising superstar of modern jazz with a gentleman known for playing valve trombone and arranging charts might have been deemed by some as a daunting task. Fortunately for the keyboardists, this was a good idea and a marvelous concept, where the two could use the concept of counterpoint and improvisation to an enjoyable means, much like a great chess match. For the listener, you are easily able to hear the difference between ostensible leader Evans in the right channel of the stereo separation, and the accompanist Brookmeyer in the left... Some have called this an effort based more on gimmick and showmanship, but if you agree to listen closely, the depth and substance of Evans and Brookmeyer reveals a lot of soul, invention, and musicians simply having a real good time".

Professional ratings
Review scores
Source	Rating
Allmusic	3.5/5 stars

== Track listing ==
1. "Honeysuckle Rose" (Andy Razaf, Fats Waller) – 5:55
2. "As Time Goes By" (Herman Hupfeld) – 6:58
3. "The Way You Look Tonight" (Dorothy Fields, Jerome Kern) – 7:41
4. "It Could Happen to You" (Johnny Burke, Jimmy Van Heusen) – 7:28
5. "The Man I Love" (Ira Gershwin, George Gershwin) – 5:58
6. "I Got Rhythm" (Gershwin, Gershwin) – 8:34

- Recorded in New York City on March 12, 1959

== Personnel ==
- Bob Brookmeyer – piano
- Bill Evans – piano
- Percy Heath – bass
- Connie Kay – drums
