= On Green Dolphin Street (Bill Evans album) =

Studio album by Bill Evans
- Released: 1975
- Recorded: January 19, 1959
- Studio: Reeves Sound Studios, New York City
- Genre: Jazz
- Length: 41:40
- Label: Victor Music Industries Inc. VIJ-6457
- Producer: Orrin Keepnews

Bill Evans chronology
Everybody Digs Bill Evans (1958)	On Green Dolphin Street (1975)	The Ivory Hunters (1959)

On Green Dolphin Street is an album by jazz pianist Bill Evans, recorded with bassist Paul Chambers and drummer Philly Joe Jones in early 1959, shortly before the Kind of Blue sessions in which both Evans and Chambers participated, but not released until 1975 as part of the double LP Peace Piece and Other Pieces. In 1995, it was issued on CD by Milestone Records under the current title, which comes from the jazz standard "On Green Dolphin Street" by Bronislaw Kaper, which Evans had first recorded the previous year with Miles Davis.

The CD edition (MCD-9235-2) also includes the first take of "All of You" from the Village Vanguard engagement by the 1961 Bill Evans Trio with bassist Scott LaFaro and drummer Paul Motian.

== Background ==
The album was recorded as part of an unusual evening session following a Chet Baker recording for which Evans, Chambers, and Jones had served as the rhythm section, as they had the previous year in the Miles Davis Sextet. Evans did not initially approve of the release of these trio recordings, as "he felt they were rhythmically very successful but that not enough was happening on other levels." The tapes remained in the vaults of Riverside Records for about 15 years, at which point they finally came again to the attention of producer Orrin Keepnews. By this time, Chambers had died and Evans finally assented to their release, saying:

It's very interesting to hear simply because of the great musicians involved with me. I think Philly Joe and Paul were pretty much at their peak at that time, and as far as I'm concerned these are two of the most underrated musicians in the history of jazz, much greater influences than they're given credit for. You really don't hear Paul Chambers mentioned that much in the history of bass playing, but I know personally that he was an influence on Scott LaFaro and Eddie Gomez—and I'll bet just about any bassist who plays well will mention Paul.

Keepnews commented, "The recordings here represent to me essentially the culmination of a specific formative period when Bill was for the first time really getting his remarkable personal form of expression fully under control."

== Reception ==
Professional ratings
Review scores
Source	Rating
AllMusic	3/5 stars

Writing for AllMusic, music critic Scott Yanow said of the album: "Although lacking the magic of Evans' regular bands, this CD reissue has its strong moments and the pianist's fans will be interested in getting the early sampling of his work."

Evans biographer Keith Shadwick expressed a similar view: "The trio came up with bright and spontaneously integrated performances of standards .... But there is little counterpoint between the players, giving the set a rather conventional sound compared with that which would soon evolve" in Evans's trio with LaFaro and Motian.

== Track listing ==
1. "You and the Night and the Music" (Howard Dietz and Arthur Schwartz) 7:20
2. "How Am I to Know?" (Jack King and Dorothy Parker) 6:22
3. "Woody 'n' You" (Take 1) (Dizzy Gillespie) 4:25
4. "Woody 'n' You" (Take 2) 4:13
5. "My Heart Stood Still" (Richard Rodgers and Lorenz Hart) 5:25
6. "On Green Dolphin Street" (Bronislaw Kaper and Ned Washington) 8:12
7. "All of You" (Take 1) (Cole Porter) 8:10

Note

- Track 7 recorded on June 25, 1961, at the Village Vanguard, New York City

== Personnel ==
- Bill Evans – piano
- Paul Chambers – bass (tracks 1–6)
- Philly Joe Jones – drums (tracks 1–6)
- Scott LaFaro – bass (track 7)
- Paul Motian – drums (track 7)
