= Haiku (Don Ellis album) =

Studio album by Don Ellis
- Released: 1974
- Recorded: June 1–4, 1973
- Genre: Jazz
- Length: 37:51
- Label: MPS/BASF; MC 25341
- Producer: Don Ellis

Don Ellis chronology
Soaring (1973)	Haiku (1974)	Music from Other Galaxies and Planets (1977)

Haiku is an album by trumpeter/bandleader Don Ellis recorded in 1973 and released on the MPS label.

== Reception ==
Professional ratings
Review scores
Source	Rating
AllMusic	3/5 stars
All About Jazz	3.5/5 stars
The Guardian	3/5 stars

Scott Yanow of Allmusic said "This album is a very different Don Ellis record. Rather than using a big band, the trumpeter is well showcased while backed by a large string section on ten moody originals ...much of the music is quite mellow. A definite change of pace".

On All About Jazz, John Kelman observed "Haiku finds Ellis in largely lyrical territory with a core quintet and varying configurations of a 12-piece string orchestra. Some tracks work better than others, but all point to a musical mind unencumbered by convention, even as he aimed, on other albums, for greater commercial success ...A tad inconsistent, perhaps, but Haiku still possesses more charm than syrup; an alternate, lyrical, and more deeply introspective view of the usually more boisterous Ellis—signaling, perhaps, a new direction that, sadly, he'd not be around long enough to explore further.."

The Guardian's John Fordham noted "This 1973 recording with a strings ensemble is very different from his adventurous work with mind-boggling time signatures in the 60s. But an Ellis venture is never without surprises. All the segments are inspired by haiku, and they reflect that form's brevity. ...The leader's unique brass sound embraced technical security, classical purity and an old jazz-brass swagger, and if some of the music gets a little Disney, it's an object lesson in orchestral writing for improvisers."

== Track listing ==
All compositions by Don Ellis

1. "Children" - 3:30
2. "Blossoming" - 3:52
3. "Water Jewel" - 5:23
4. "Cherry Petals" - 2:47
5. "Forest" - 3:30
6. "Summer Rain" - 2:20
7. "Two Autumns" - 4:57
8. "Mirror-Pond of Stars" - 3:25
9. "Parting" - 6:18
10. "Dew" - 1:28

== Personnel ==
- Don Ellis – trumpet and arranger
- Milcho Leviev – keyboards
- Larry Carlton (tracks 2 & 7), David Cohen (tracks 1, 3, 6 & 8), Tommy Tedesco (tracks 4, 9 & 10) – guitar
- Ray Brown – bass
- John Guerin – drums
- Israel Baker, Erno Neufeld, Jacob Krachmalnik, George Kast, George Berres, Gerald Vinci, Shirley Cornell, Marcia van Dyck & Marvin Limonick – violin
- Samuel Voghossian, Alfred Barr & Dan Neufeld (tracks 1–3 & 5–8), Allan Harshman, David Schwarz & Myra Kestenbaum (tracks 4, 9 & 10) – viola
- Raphael Kramer, Frederick Seykora, Ronald Cooper & Catherine Gotthofer – cello
