= Brad Gowans =

American jazz trombonist and reedist

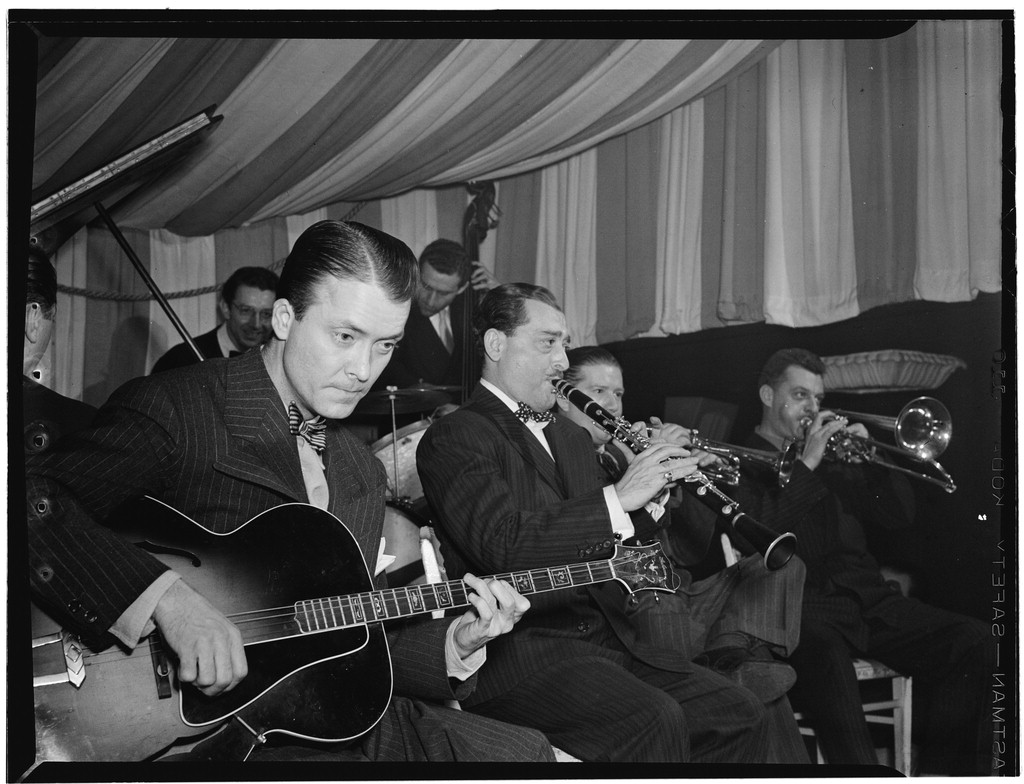
- Brad Gowans (at right), at Eddie Condon's, New York, ca. 1946

Background information
- Birth name: Arthur Bradford Gowans
- Born: December 3, 1903
- Origin: Billerica, Massachusetts
- Died: September 8, 1954 (aged 50); Los Angeles, California, U.S.
- Genres: Dixieland
- Instrument(s): Valve trombone, cornet, clarinet
- Formerly of: Bud Freeman, Max Kaminsky

Arthur Bradford "Brad" Gowans (December 3, 1903, Billerica, Massachusetts – September 8, 1954, Los Angeles) was an American jazz trombonist and reedist.

Gowans' earliest work was on the Dixieland jazz scene, playing with the Rhapsody Makers Band, Tommy DeRosa's New Orleans Jazz Band, and Perley Breed. In 1926 he played cornet with Joe Venuti, and worked later in the 1920s with Red Nichols, Jimmy Durante, Mal Hallett (1927–29), and Bert Lown. He left music for several years during the Great Depression, then returned to play with Bobby Hackett (1936), Frank Ward, Wingy Manone (1938), Hackett again, Joe Marsala, and Bud Freeman's Summa Cum Laude Band (1939–40).

Early in the 1940s he played regularly at Nick's in Greenwich Village in New York City, and worked with Ray McKinley and Art Hodes. As a clarinetist, he played in the reconstituted Original Dixieland Jazz Band's 1940s recordings. He stopped playing again briefly in the mid-1940s, then returned to play with Max Kaminsky (1945–46), Jimmy Dorsey, and Nappy Lamare (1949–50). Following this he played freelance on the West Coast. He collapsed on stage in 1954 while playing with Eddie Skrivanek and died eight months later.

Aside from his playing, he also arranged pieces for Bud Freeman and Lee Wiley, and invented the valide trombone, a hybrid slide-valve trombone which never caught on. He recorded a few times as a leader in 1926, 1927, and 1934, and did a full LP for Victor Records in 1946. Gowans is credited in Nat Hentoff's jazz history classic Hear Me Talkin' To Ya with one of the great all-time one-liners. Asked by a prospective band leader whether he could read music, Gowans reportedly replied, "Not well enough to hurt my playing."

== Discography ==
- Brad Gowans and his New York Nine (recorded 1946), RCA Victor 10" LP LJM 3000
