= Bob Brookmeyer =

American jazz musician, arranger, and composer (1929–2011)

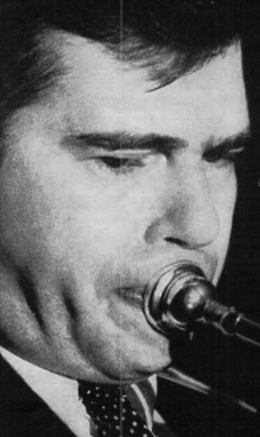
- Brookmeyer in a 1963 advertisement

Background information
- Born: Robert Edward Brookmeyer; December 19, 1929; Kansas City, Missouri, U.S.
- Died: December 15, 2011 (aged 81) New London, New Hampshire, U.S.
- Genres: Mainstream jazz, Cool jazz, West Coast jazz, Post bop
- Occupations: Musician, composer, arranger, educator
- Instruments: Valve trombone, piano
- Labels: Impulse!, Mainstream, RCA, Verve
- Formerly of: Gary Burton, Bill Evans, Stan Getz, Jimmy Giuffre, Jim Hall, Gary McFarland, Gerry Mulligan, Lalo Schifrin, Clark Terry, The Thad Jones/Mel Lewis Orchestra, Claude Thornhill, Zoot Sims

Robert Edward "Bob" Brookmeyer (December 19, 1929 – December 15, 2011) was an American jazz valve trombonist, pianist, arranger, and composer. Born in Kansas City, Missouri, Brookmeyer first gained widespread public attention as a member of Gerry Mulligan's quartet from 1954 to 1957. He later worked with Jimmy Giuffre, before rejoining Mulligan's Concert Jazz Band. He received eight Grammy Award nominations during his lifetime.

== Biography ==
Brookmeyer was born on December 19, 1929, Kansas City, Missouri, United States. He was the only child of Elmer Edward Brookmeyer and Mayme Seifert.

Brookmeyer began playing professionally in his teens. He attended the Kansas City Conservatory of Music, but did not graduate. He played piano in big bands led by Tex Beneke and Ray McKinley, but concentrated on valve trombone from when he moved to the Claude Thornhill orchestra in the early 1950s. He was part of small groups led by Stan Getz, Jimmy Giuffre, and Gerry Mulligan in the 1950s. During the 1950s and 1960s, Brookmeyer played in New York clubs, on television (including being part of the house band for The Merv Griffin Show), and on studio recordings, as well as arranging for Ray Charles and others.

In the early 1960s, Brookmeyer joined flugelhorn player Clark Terry in a band that achieved some success. In February 1965, Brookmeyer and Terry appeared together on BBC2's Jazz 625.

Brookmeyer moved to Los Angeles, California, in 1968 and became a full-time studio musician. He spent 10 years on the West Coast and developed a serious alcohol problem. After he overcame this, he returned to New York. Brookmeyer became the musical director of the Thad Jones/Mel Lewis Orchestra in 1979, although he had not composed any music for a decade. Brookmeyer wrote for and performed with jazz groups in Europe from the early 1980s. He founded and ran a music school in the Netherlands, and taught at the New England Conservatory of Music in Boston, Massachusetts, and other institutions.

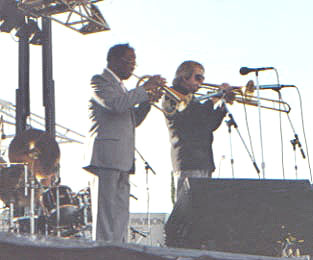
Clark Terry and Brookmeyer at the Clearwater Jazz Festival in the 1980s

In June 2005, Brookmeyer joined ArtistShare and announced a project to fund an upcoming third album featuring his New Art Orchestra. The resulting Grammy-nominated CD, titled Spirit Music, was released in 2006. Brookmeyer was named a National Endowment for the Arts Jazz Master in the same year. His eighth Grammy Award nomination was for an arrangement from the Vanguard Jazz Orchestra's album, Forever Lasting, shortly before his death. That same album was also nominated in the 57th Annual Grammy Awards for the category of Best Large Jazz Ensemble Album; the CD was entirely made up of Brookmeyer's compositions.

Brookmeyer died of congestive heart failure on December 15, 2011, in New London, New Hampshire.

== Compositional style ==
One notable element of Brookmeyer's compositional style is his use of contemporary classical writing techniques in his works for big bands and jazz ensembles. In the early 1980's Brookmeyer was mentored by composer Earle Brown, with whom he explored 20th century classical music in depth. Brookmeyer's works since have been influenced by such composers as Witold Lutosławski (whose cello concerto Brookmeyer used often in teaching students about simple motifs), Igor Stravinsky, Claude Debussy, György Ligeti, and Béla Bartók.

Some examples of 20th-century classical compositional techniques used in Brookmeyer's jazz pieces are:

- "ABC Blues", where an atonal tone row is used to generate melodies and harmonies.
- "The Big Time", where polytonality is used to develop melodies used earlier on in the composition.
- Bob Brookmeyer uses chromatic harmony and tone clusters throughout such works as "Seesaw", "Silver Lining", and "Hello and Goodbye".

== Honors and awards ==
=== Grammy Awards (nominations) ===
Year	Nominee / work	Award	Result
1960	Blues Suite', composed by Brookmeyer	Best Arrangement	Nominated
1965	The Power Of Positive Swinging, composed by Brookmeyer	Best Instrumental Jazz Performance	Nominated
1966	ABC Blues, composed by Brookmeyer	Best Original Jazz Composition	Nominated
1980	Skylark, arranged by Brookmeyer	Best Instrumental Arrangement	Nominated
2001	Impulsive! (Album)	Best Large Jazz Ensemble Album	Nominated
2004	Get Well Soon (Album)	Large Jazz Ensemble Album	Nominated
2006	Spirit Music (Album)	Large Jazz Ensemble Album	Nominated
2008	St. Louis Blues, arranged by Brookmeyer	Best Instrumental Arrangement	Nominated
2011	Nasty Dance, arranged by Brookmeyer	Best Instrumental Arrangement	Nominated

== Discography ==
=== As leader/co-leader ===
- Bob Brookmeyer Quartet (Pacific Jazz, 1954)
- Bob Brookmeyer Plays Bob Brookmeyer and Some Others (Clef, 1955)
- Happy Minors (Bethlehem, 1955) with Red Mitchell, Zoot Sims
- The Dual Role of Bob Brookmeyer (Prestige, 1956) – recorded in 1954-1955
- Tonite's Music Today with Zoot Sims (Storyville, 1956)
- Whooeeee with Zoot Sims (Storyville, 1956)
- Bob Brookmeyer Quintet (Vogue, 1956)
- Urso and Brookmeyer with Phil Urso (Savoy, 1956)
- Brookmeyer (Vik, 1957) – recorded in 1956
- Traditionalism Revisited (World Pacific, 1957)
- The Street Swingers (World Pacific, 1958)
- Jazz Concerto Grosso with Gerry Mulligan (ABC–Paramount, 1958) – play Phil Sunkel, recorded in 1957.
- They Met at the Continental Divide with Trombones Inc. (Warner Bros., 1959)
- Kansas City Revisited (United Artists, 1959)
- The Ivory Hunters with Bill Evans (United Artists, 1959) – also released as As Time Goes By (Blue Note LT series, 1981)
- Jazz Is a Kick (Mercury, 1960)
- Portrait of the Artist (Atlantic, 1960) – recorded in 1959
- The Blues Hot and Cold (His Master's Voice, 1960)
- Gloomy Sunday and Other Bright Moments (Verve, 1961)
- 7 x Wilder (Verve, 1961)
- Trombone Jazz Samba (Verve, 1962)
- Bob Brookmeyer and Friends (Columbia, 1965) – recorded in 1964
- The Bob Brookmeyer Small Band (Gryphon, 1978)
- Back Again (Sonet, 1979)
- Through a Looking Glass (Finesse, 1981)
- Oslo (Concord Jazz, 1987) – recorded in 1987
- Morning Fun with Zoot Sims (Black Lion, 1989)
- Dreams with the Stockholm Jazz Orchestra (Dragon, 1989)
- Electricity (ACT, 1994) - recorded in 1991
- As It Happened Vol. 1, with Roger Kellaway (Jazz Heritage, 1994)
- Paris Suite (Challenge, 1995)
- Out of This World with Metropole Orchestra (Koch Jazz, 1998)
- Old Friends (Storyville, 1998) - recorded in 1994
- New Works Celebration (Challenge, 1999) - recorded in 1997
- Together with Mads Vinding (Challenge, 1999)
- Waltzing With Zoe (Challenge, 2001)
- Holiday (Challenge, 2001) – plays piano
- Madly Loving You with the Ed Partyka Jazz Orchestra (Challenge, 2001)
- Stay Out of the Sun (Challenge, 2003) - recorded in 2000
- Get Well Soon with New Art Orchestra (Challenge, 2003) - recorded in 2002
- Island with Kenny Wheeler (Artists House, 2003) - recorded in 2002
- Spirit Music with New Art Orchestra (ArtistShare, 2006)
- Music for String Quartet and Orchestra with the Metropole Orchestra and Gustav Klimt String Quartet (Challenge, 2008)

=== As sideman ===
With Manny Albam

- The Jazz Workshop (RCA Victor, 1956)
- Play Music from the Broadway Musical West Side Story (Coral, 1957)
- Manny Albam and the Jazz Greats of Our Time (Coral, 1957)
- Sophisticated Lady (Coral, 1958)
- The Blues Is Everybody's Business (Coral, 1958)
- Steve's Songs (Dot, 1958)
- Jazz Horizons: Jazz New York (Dot, 1959)
- Brass on Fire (Solid State, 1966)

With Steve Allen

- ...And All That Jazz (Dot, 1959)
- Soulful Brass #2 (Flying Dutchman, 1969)

With Chet Baker

- Chet Baker Sextet (Pacific Jazz, 1954)
- The Trumpet Artistry of Chet Baker (Pacific Jazz, 1955) – compilation

With Teddy Charles

- Teddy Charles Featuring Bobby Brookmeyer (Prestige, 1954)
- Salute to Hamp Flyin' Home (Bethlehem, 1959)

With Al Cohn

- The Al Cohn Quintet Featuring Bobby Brookmeyer (Coral, 1957) – rec. 1956
- Son of Drum Suite (RCA Victor, 1961)

With Stan Getz

- Interpretations by the Stan Getz Quintet (Norgran, 1954) – rec. 1953
- Stan Getz at The Shrine (Norgran, 1955)
- Stan Getz and the Cool Sounds (Verve, 1957)
- Recorded Fall 1961 (Verve, 1961)
- Jazz Samba (Verve, 1962)
- Big Band Bossa Nova (Verve, 1962)

With Jimmy Giuffre

- Trav'lin' Light (Atlantic, 1958)
- The Four Brothers Sound (Atlantic, 1959)
- Western Suite (Atlantic, 1960)

With Jim Hall

- Live at Town Hall Vol. One (Musicmasters, 1991)
- Live at the North Sea Jazz Festival (Challenge, 1999)

With Nancy Harrow

- You're Nearer (Tono 1986)
- Street of Dreams (Poljazz, 1989)

With Woody Herman

- The Herd Rides Again (Everest, 1958)
- The Fourth Herd (Jazz Legacy, 1960)
- Woody Herman & the Fourth Herd (Windmill, 1972)

With Gary McFarland

- The Jazz Version of "How to Succeed in Business without Really Trying" (Verve, 1962)
- Tijuana Jazz (Impulse! 1966)

With Gerry Mulligan

- Paris Concert (Pacific Jazz, 1955) – rec. 1954
- California Concerts (Pacific Jazz, 1955) – rec. 1954
- Presenting the Gerry Mulligan Sextet (EmArcy, 1955)
- Recorded in Boston at Storyville (Pacific Jazz, 1957) – rec. 1956
- The Teddy Wilson Trio & Gerry Mulligan Quartet with Bob Brookmeyer at Newport (Verve, 1957)
- The Concert Jazz Band (Verve, 1960)
- Gerry Mulligan and the Concert Jazz Band at the Village Vanguard (Verve, 1961) – rec. 1960
- Gerry Mulligan Presents a Concert in Jazz (Verve, 1961)
- Gerry Mulligan and the Concert Jazz Band on Tour (Verve, 1962) – rec. 1960
- The Gerry Mulligan Quartet (Verve, 1962)
- Spring Is Sprung (Philips, 1963) – recorded in 1962
- Night Lights (Philips, 1963) – rec. 1962
- Butterfly with Hiccups (Limelight, 1964) – rec. 1963-64

With Jimmy Raney

- Jimmy Raney Featuring Bob Brookmeyer (ABC-Paramount, 1956)
- Jimmy Raney in Three Attitudes (ABC-Paramount, 1957)

With George Russell

- New York N.Y. (Decca, 1959)
- Jazz in the Space Age (Decca, 1960)

With Don Sebesky

- Three Works for Jazz Soloists & Symphony Orchestra (Gryphon, 1979)
- I Remember Bill (RCA Victor, 1998)
- Joyful Noise (RCA Victor, 1999)

With Bud Shank

- Bud Shank and Bob Brookmeyer (Pacific Jazz, 1954)
- The Saxophone Artistry of Bud Shank (Pacific Jazz, 1956)

With Zoot Sims

- Tonite's Music Today (Storyville, 1956)
- The Modern Art of Jazz (Dawn, 1956)
- Bob Brookmeyer Octet Stretching Out (United Artists, 1959)
- Choice (Pacific Jazz, 1961)
- Suitably Zoot (Pumpkin, 1979)

With Clark Terry

- The Power of Positive Swinging (Mainstream, 1965)
- Tonight (Mainstream, 1965)
- Gingerbread Men (Mainstream, 1966)
- Previously Unreleased Recordings (Verve, 1973)
- Gingerbread Gal (Mainstream, 1974)
- What'd He Say (Mainstream, 1974)

With others

- Cannonball Adderley, African Waltz (Riverside 1961)
- Benny Aronov, Shadow Box (Choice, 1979)
- Ruby Braff, Blowing Around the World (United Artists, 1959)
- Canadian Brass, Swingtime! (RCA Victor, 1995)
- Bobby Bryant, The Jazz Excursion into Hair (Pacific Jazz, 1969)
- Monty Budwig, Dig (Concord Jazz, 1979)
- Ralph Burns, Where There's Burns There's Fire (Warwick, 1961)
- Kenny Burrell, Both Feet On the Ground (Fantasy, 1973)
- Gary Burton, The Groovy Sound of Music (RCA Victor, 1965)
- Ray Charles, The Genius of Ray Charles (Atlantic, 1959)
- Tony Coe, Captain Coe's Famous Racearound (Storyville, 1996)
- Al Jazzbo Collins, Presents Swinging at the Opera (Everest, 1960)
- John Dankworth, The Zodiac Variations (Fontana, 1965)
- Eliane Elias, Bob Brookmeyer, Play the Music of Eliane Elias Impulsive! (Stunt, 1997)
- Bill Evans, Waltz for Debby (Not Now Music, 2012)
- Gil Evans, Into the Hot (Impulse! 1962)
- Harold Farberman, Gunther Schuller, Dedicated to Dolphy (Cambridge, 1966)
- Dave Frishberg, You're A Lucky Guy (Concord Jazz, 1978)
- Curtis Fuller, Cabin in the Sky (ABC Impulse!, 1970)
- Terry Gibbs, Swingin' with Terry Gibbs and His Orchestra (EmArcy, 1956)
- Astrud Gilberto, The Shadow of Your Smile (Verve, 1965)
- Buddy Greco, I Like It Swinging (Columbia, 1961)
- Bobby Hackett, Creole Cookin' (Verve, 1967)
- Judy Holliday, Holliday with Mulligan (DRG, 1980)
- Chubby Jackson, Chubby Takes Over (Empire, 2005)
- Thad Jones & Mel Lewis, Presenting Thad Jones Mel Lewis & the Jazz Orchestra (Solid State, 1966)
- Thad Jones & Mel Lewis, Live at the Village Vanguard (Solid State, 1967)
- Teddi King, Now in Vogue (Vogue, 1955)
- Michel Legrand, Plays Richard Rodgers (Philips, 1963)
- Mel Lewis, Make Me Smile & Other New Works by Bob Brookmeyer (Finesse, 1982)
- Harry Lookofsky, Stringsville (Atlantic, 1959)
- Charlie Mariano, A Jazz Portrait of Charlie Mariano (Regina, 1963)
- Red Mitchell, Happy Minors (Bethlehem, 1955)
- Thelonious Monk, Monk's Blues (Columbia, 1992)
- Brew Moore, Brothers and Other Mothers Vol. 2 (Savoy, 1979)
- Red Norvo, Red's Rose Room Red's Blue Room (RCA Camden 1976)
- Anita O'Day, All the Sad Young Men (Verve, 1962)
- Babatunde Olatunji, High Life! (Columbia, 1963)
- Freda Payne, After the Lights Go Down Low and Much More!!! (Impulse! 1963)
- Oscar Pettiford, Another One (Bethlehem, 1955)
- Michel Petrucciani, Both Worlds (Dreyfus, 1997)
- Bill Potts, The Jazz Soul of Porgy & Bess (United Artists, 1959)
- Tito Rodriguez, Live at Birdland (Bomba, 1963)
- Pee Wee Russell & Coleman Hawkins, Jazz Reunion (Candid, 1961)
- Lalo Schifrin, Samba Para Dos (Verve, 1963)
- Helen Schneider, Right As the Rain (Tomato, 1995)
- Tom Scott, Tom Scott in L.A. (Flying Dutchman, 1975)
- Carol Sloane, Out of the Blue (Columbia, 1962)
- Henri Texier, Respect (Label Bleu, 1997)
- Bob Thiele, Head Start (Flying Dutchman, 1969)
- Toots Thielemans, Yesterday & Today
- Jeremy Udden, Torchsongs (Fresh Sound, 2006)
- Phil Urso, The Philosophy of Urso (Savoy, 1985)
- Helen Ward, Peanuts Hucko, With a Little Bit of Swing (RCA Victor, 1958)
- George Williams, Put On Your Dancing Shoes (United Artists, 1960)
- Joe Williams, Presenting Joe Williams and Thad Jones Mel Lewis, the Jazz Orchestra (Solid State, 1966)
- Paul Williams, Just an Old Fashioned Love Song (A&M, 1971)

== See also ==
- List of jazz arrangers
