= Firebird (trumpet) =

Hybrid musical instrument

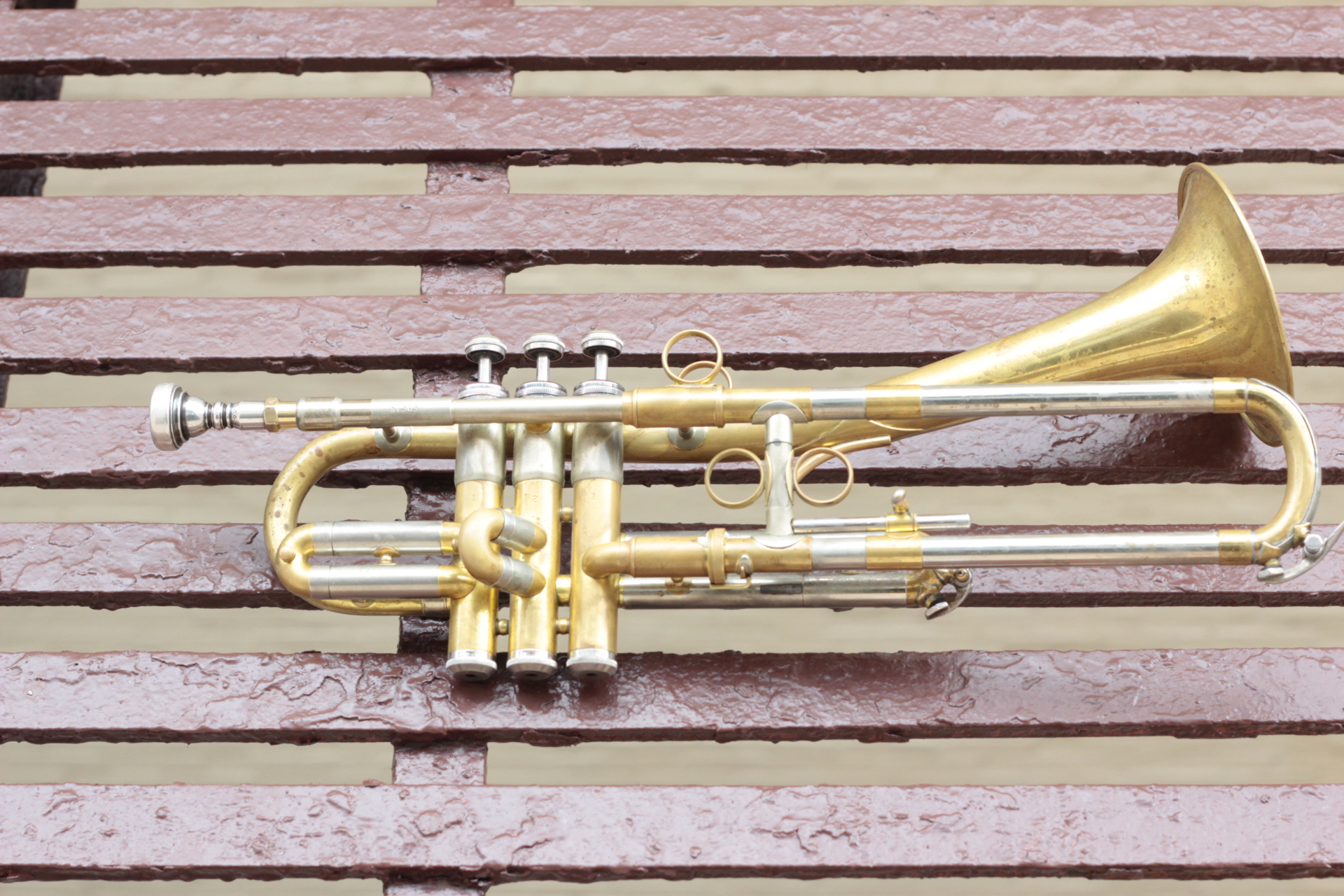
- Firebird trumpet

Brass instrument
- Classification: Wind; Brass; Aerophone
- Hornbostel–Sachs classification: 423.2 (Sliding and Valved aerophone sounded by lip movement)

Related instruments
- Trumpet; Soprano trombone; Superbone

Musicians
- Axel Dörner; Maynard Ferguson; Leonel Kaplan; James Morrison

The Firebird is a type of trumpet with the standard three valves and the addition of a trombone-style slide. It was invented by Maynard Ferguson and Larry Ramirez and remains an exceptionally rare, specialist instrument. They were occasionally produced by Holton.

== History ==
Hybrid or "duplex" brass instruments equipped with both a slide and valves were built as early as the 1860s, by instrument makers Besson and Conn.

Jazz trumpet player Maynard Ferguson worked with Holton (now a division of C.G. Conn) to develop the model ST302 trumpet. It was designed by Larry Ramirez, who spoke to Ferguson about a valve/slide trombone that he had designed some 12 years earlier. This led to Ramirez designing a new valve/slide trombone for Ferguson, called the Superbone, in October 1974.

After touring with the Superbone, Ferguson spoke to Ramirez about making a trumpet with the same valve/slide capability. In order to preserve the length of tubing required to make a B♭ trumpet, the slide could only be made with four positions instead of the standard seven on a trombone. The bell was bent up approximately 20 degrees so that the slide could clear it when extended. This instrument was dubbed the “Firebird”, and went into production on or around May 28, 1983 as Model ST303.

By 2000, Ramirez came up with a design for a full seven-position Firebird trumpet. The slide was a telescoping slide-within-a-slide assembly that could be extended to twice its length. Only two of these were made—the first was a prototype and the second was made years later when the first was damaged.

== Technique ==
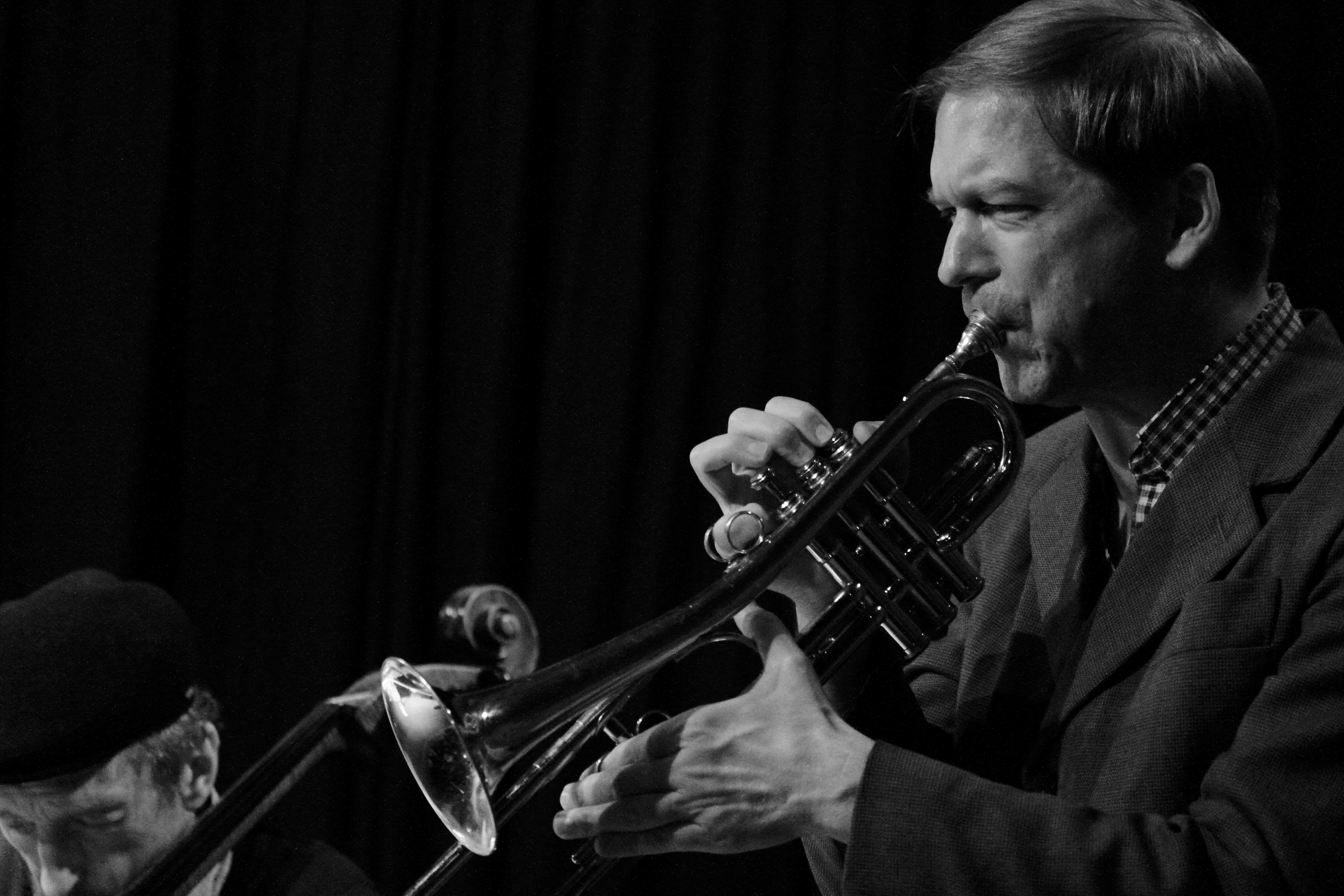
Axel Dörner playing a Firebird trumpet, 2015

The Firebird may be played strictly as a valve trumpet, or using the valves and slide in conjunction. With only the first four slide positions available, some lower notes (low F♯, G, A♭, C♯, D, E♭, and the second A♭) require the use of valves. Higher A♭s can be achieved using normally out-of-tune harmonics, since the slide allows for microtuning adjustments.

The trumpet may be gripped with either the left hand or the right hand, and the valves may also be operated by either hand, which is facilitated by the presence of two pinky rings on the top. Similarly, the slide may be operated by either hand, giving the player the option to finger the valves with the right hand and operate the slide with the left, or vice versa.

Other than the slide, the Firebird's playing technique is no different from standard trumpet technique.

== Notable players ==
Popular artists who have used the Firebird on recordings and live performances include:

- Axel Dörner
- Don Ellis
- Maynard Ferguson
- Leonel Kaplan
- James Morrison
