= Gustave Auguste Besson =

French musical instrument maker

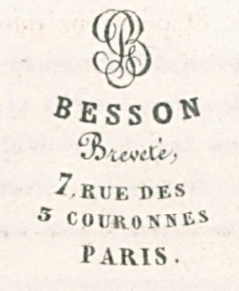
Besson's factory mark on a brass instrument

Gustave-Auguste Besson (1820-1874) was a musical instrument manufacturer and innovator. He created the Besson brand in Paris, France, in 1837. Besson is credited with more than 50 original inventions. His alterations to the cornet were particularly notable.

Besson's instruments were revolutionary in their design and quality, and as such became famous across Europe. After a series of lawsuits with Adolphe Sax, Besson left Paris in 1858 and relocated to London. He continued to manufacture instruments in Paris and London and had distribution warehouses in Brussels, Charleroi, Madrid and Barcelona. After Besson's death in 1874, the company changed its name in France to become Fontaine-Besson in 1880. It remained Besson in Great Britain.

== Life ==
Besson was apprenticed at the age of 10 to an instrument maker called Dujariez in Paris. By the age of 18 he had produced and registered a new model cornet which was universally recognised as a great improvement on all previous instruments of its kind. By 1850 Besson had opened a brand of his business in London at the premises of instrument maker John Pask. In 1858, Besson moved to London and transferred the assets of his firm in France to his wife, Florentine Besson. When Besson died in 1874, the business was continued by his widow and their daughters Cécile and Marthe.
