= Valve trombone =

Brass instrument in the trombone family with valves

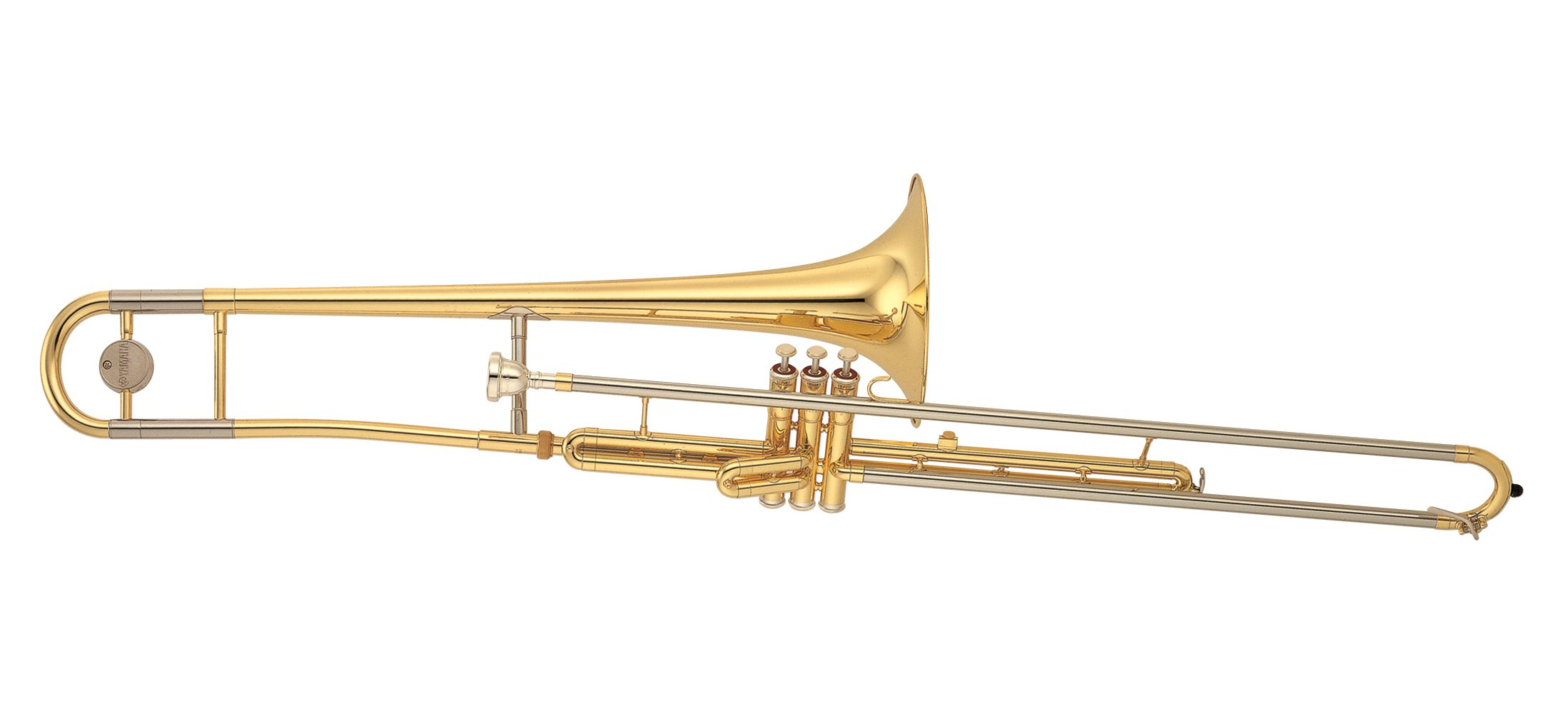
- Valve (tenor) trombone in B♭

Brass instrument
- Classification: Wind; Brass; Aerophone
- Hornbostel–Sachs classification: 423.233.2 (Valved aerophone sounded by lip vibration with cylindrical bore longer than 2 metres)
- Developed: Mid 19th century

Related instruments
- Trombone; Trumpet; Firebird; Cimbasso

Musicians
- Bob Brookmeyer; Bob Enevoldsen; Maynard Ferguson; Brad Gowans; Rob McConnell; Tevin Black; Kyler Sims; Cecelia Garnett

Builders
- Conn; Olds; King; Bach; Yamaha; Holton; Jupiter; Getzen; Besson; J.W. Pepper; Kanstul; Schagerl

The valve trombone is a brass instrument in the trombone family that has a set of valves to vary the pitch instead of (or in addition to) a slide. Although it has been built in sizes from alto to contrabass, it is the tenor valve trombone pitched in B♭ an octave lower than the trumpet which has seen the most widespread use. The most common models have three piston valves. They are found in jazz and popular music, as well as marching bands in Europe, where they are often built with rotary valves and were widely used in orchestras in the 19th century.

== History ==
The valve trombone emerged concurrently with the invention of valves in the early 19th century. Most early instruments retained the shape and form of the slide trombone, employing three valves with the tubing arranged in place of the slide; others used the new valve mechanism as an opportunity to explore different configurations while retaining the overall cylindrical bore and bell profile.

19th century valve trombones
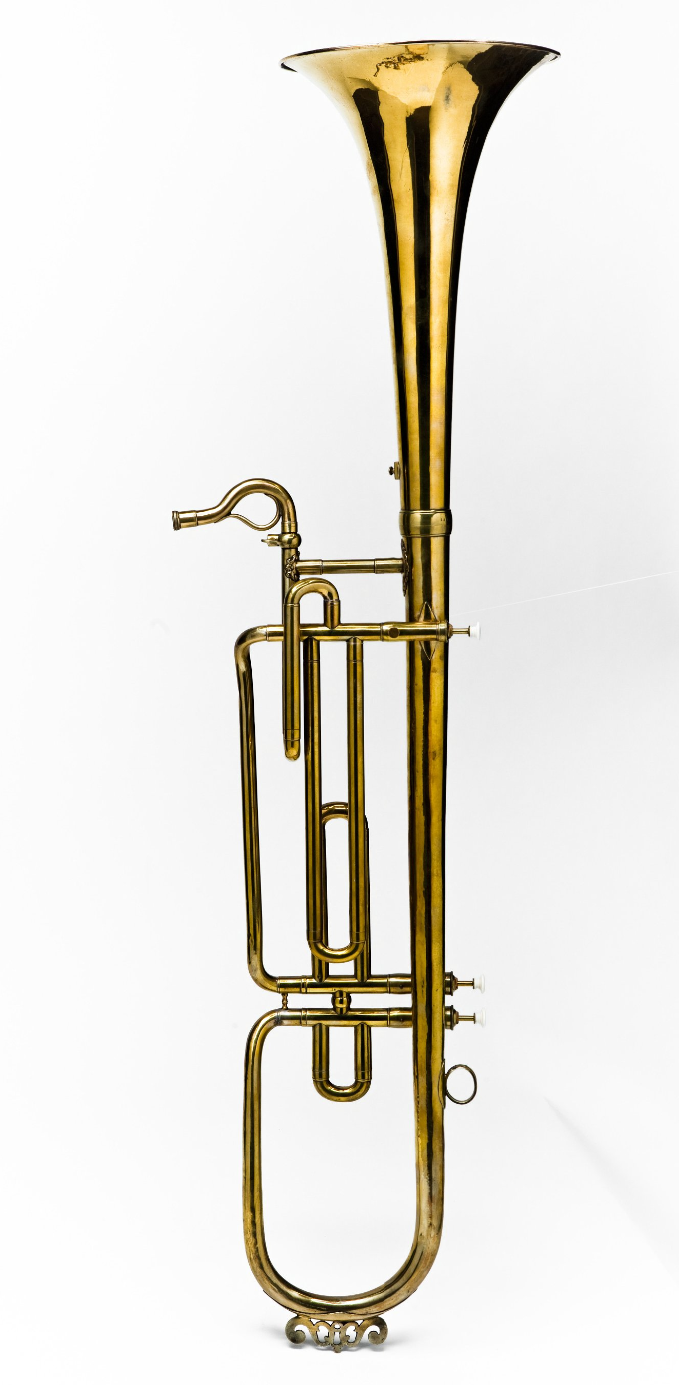
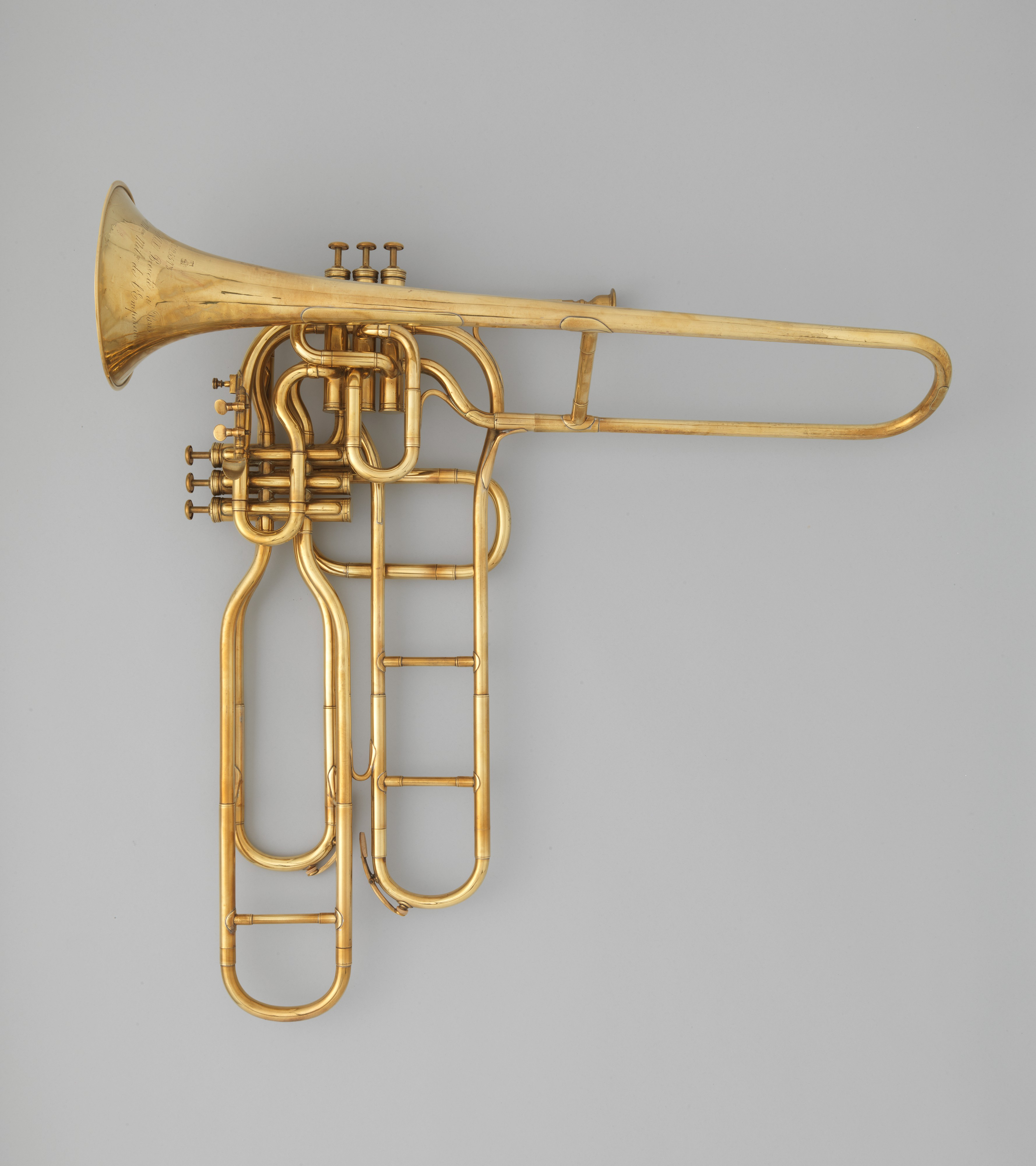
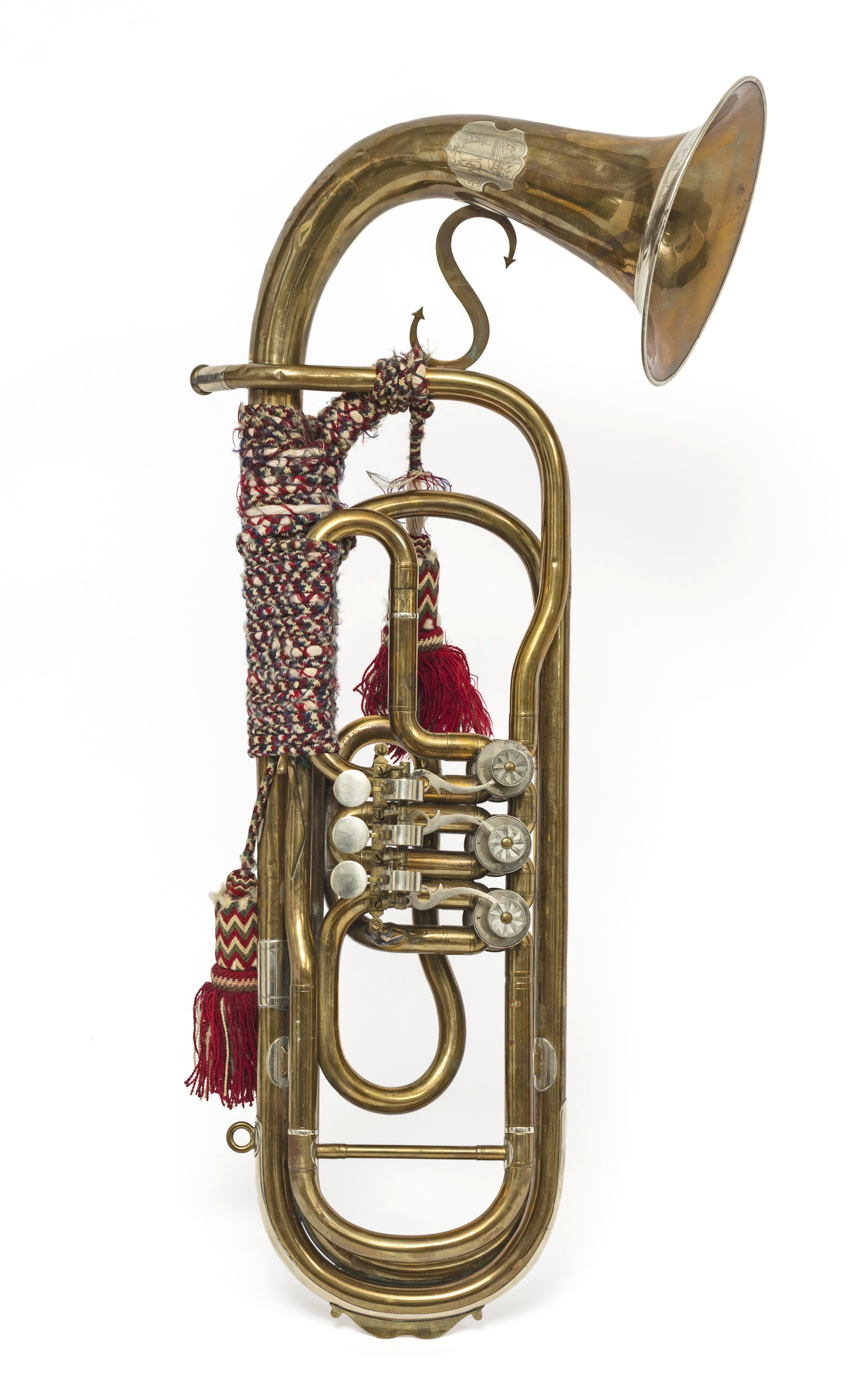
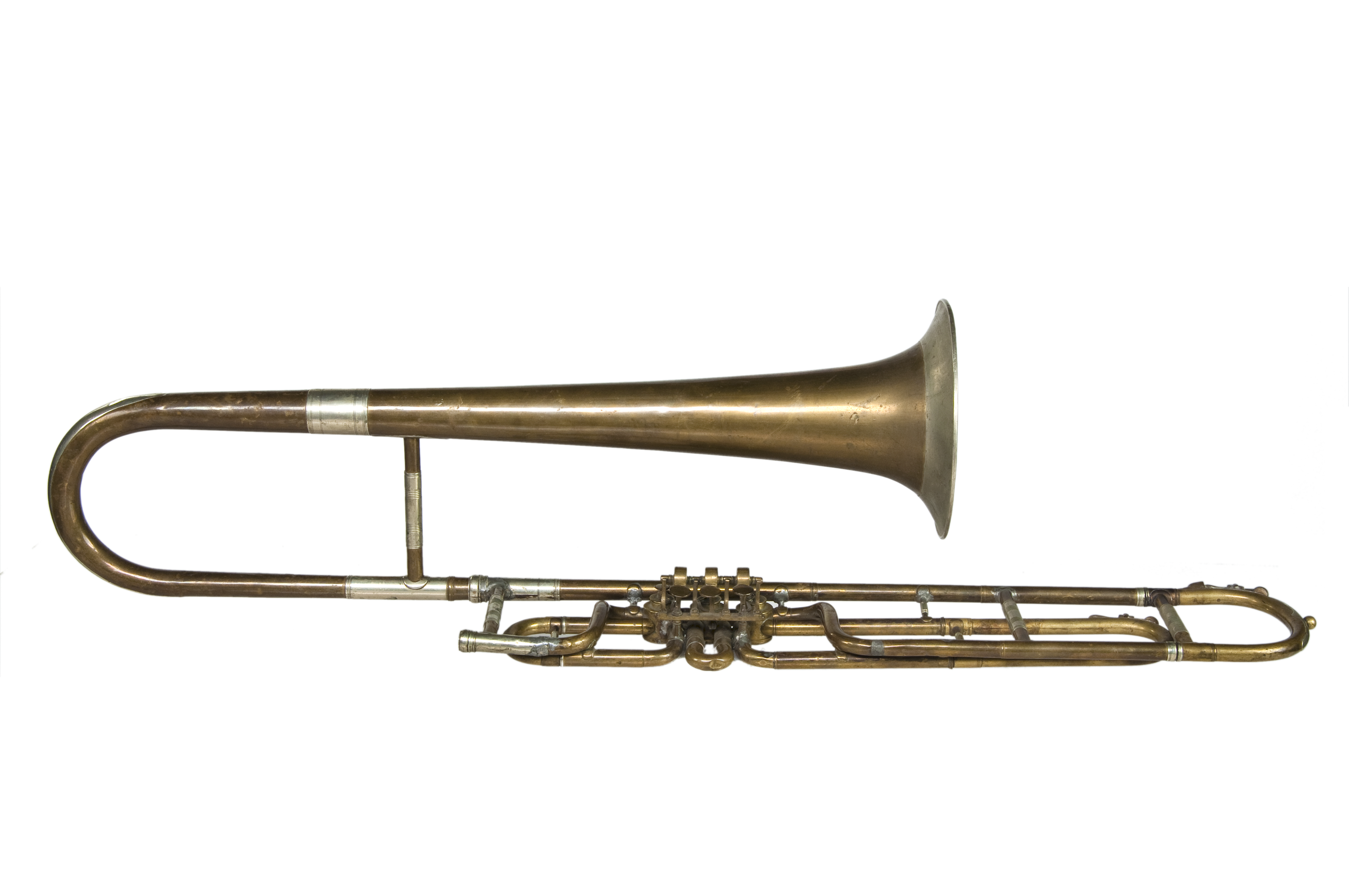
From left to right: clavicor with three Stölzel valves, c. 1830 (St Cecilia's Hall, University of Edinburgh); cavalry trombone with six Périnet valves by Adolphe Sax, c. 1863 (Metropolitan Museum of Art, New York); armeeposaune with rotary valves, c. 1880 (St Cecilia's Hall, University of Edinburgh); valve trombone with rotary valves, c. 1890s (Scenknostmuseet, Stockholm)

It enjoyed its greatest popularity in the 19th century, when the technology of valves was developing rapidly. They became popular in European orchestras particularly in Italy and Austria, where composers wrote with a section of three valve trombones in mind. Among the first French valve trombones was the clavicor, configured upright with three Stölzel valves, briefly replacing the quinticlave in bands until it was itself replaced by saxhorns.

Valve trombones were made in many configurations for marching bands, and in particular for mounted bands. A type of cavalry trombone invented by Adolphe Sax in the 1860s has six valves, instead of the usual three, one for each position on the trombone slide. Instead of adding tubing, these valves isolate different amounts of tubing from the total length. Their unusual shape was designed to make it easier for players in cavalry bands to hold and use while mounted. They were included in the curriculum at the Conservatoire de Paris in the last half of the 19th century, and used in French orchestras for a time despite the large amounts of tubing which made the instruments heavy and unwieldy to play.

In Austria-Hungary in the 1860s, instrument makers V. F. Červený & Synové invented a family of Armeeposaune (lit. 'army trombone') in sizes from E♭ alto to B♭ contrabass, also designed for use in mounted and marching bands.

The valve trombone was popular in American brass bands and military bands in the mid to late 19th century. The slide trombone did not reappear until the "tailgate" style of playing emerged around 1904 in New Orleans Dixieland jazz.

In Italy, a contrabass valve trombone known as the trombone basso Verdi was developed in the 1880s and used in operas by Verdi and Puccini. This instrument was the prototype for the modern cimbasso, which has seen a 21st century revival in video game music and film scores.

Valved alto trombones in E♭ were occasionally built but remain rare instruments; a few survive in museums.

By the beginning of the 20th century, mass production of reliable instruments with high quality slides led to a return to popularity of the slide trombone. Despite this, valve trombones still remain popular in parts of eastern Europe and Italy, in Banda music, military and brass bands in South America and India, and in jazz, often as a doubling instrument for trumpet players.

== Performance characteristics ==
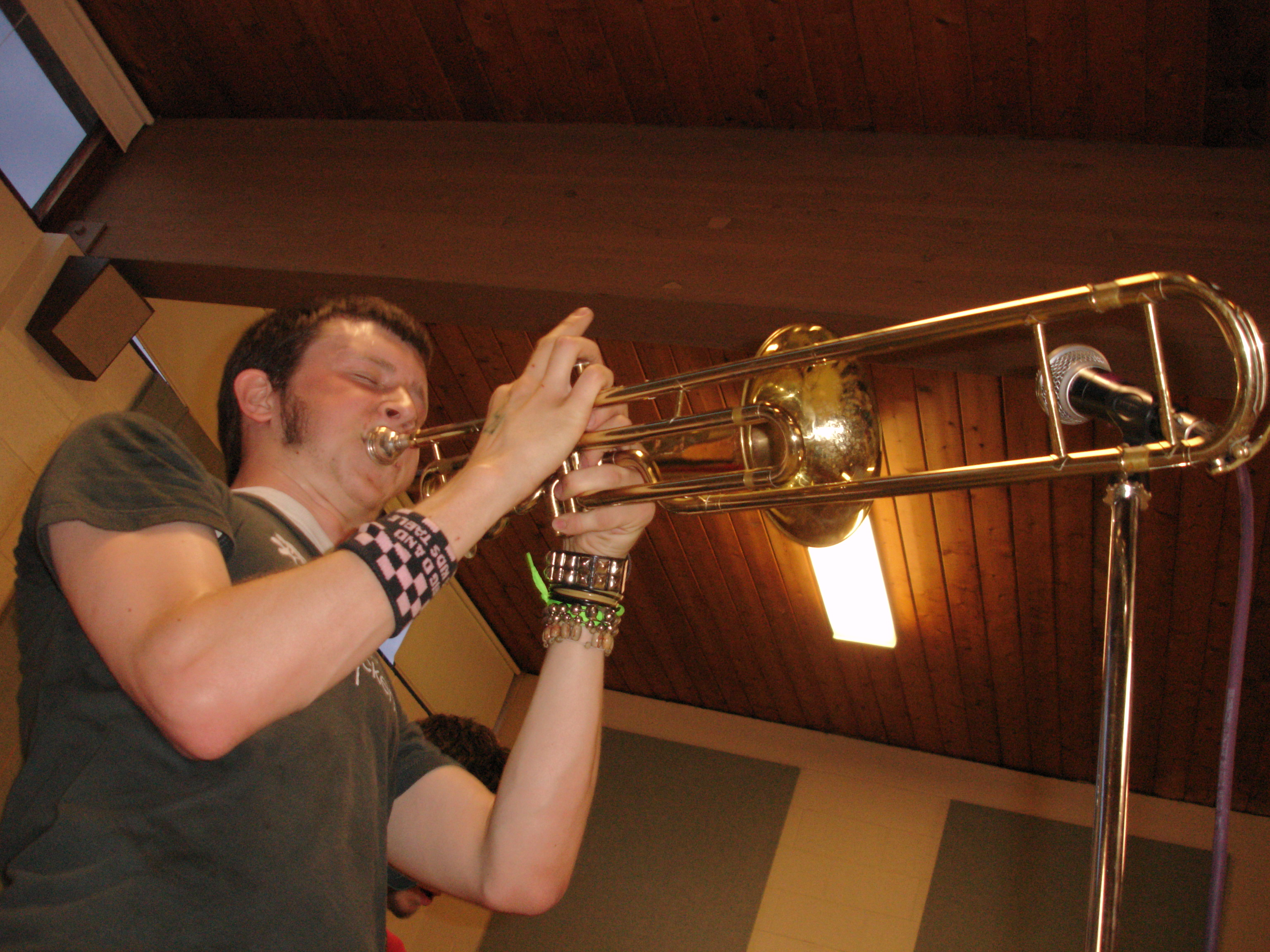
Former trombonist of ska punk band We Are the Union performs on a valve trombone

Some passages, particularly fast musical figures, are easier to execute on a valve trombone than on a slide trombone. Italian composers in particular, such as Verdi and Rossini, made use of its agility. The valve trombone is also useful for situations when the movement of a slide can be impractical, such as when marching, mounted, or playing in a cramped orchestra pit. Many players consider the tone of a valve trombone to be stuffier and less open, and it is no longer common in orchestras.

== In jazz ==
Jazz valve trombone variants
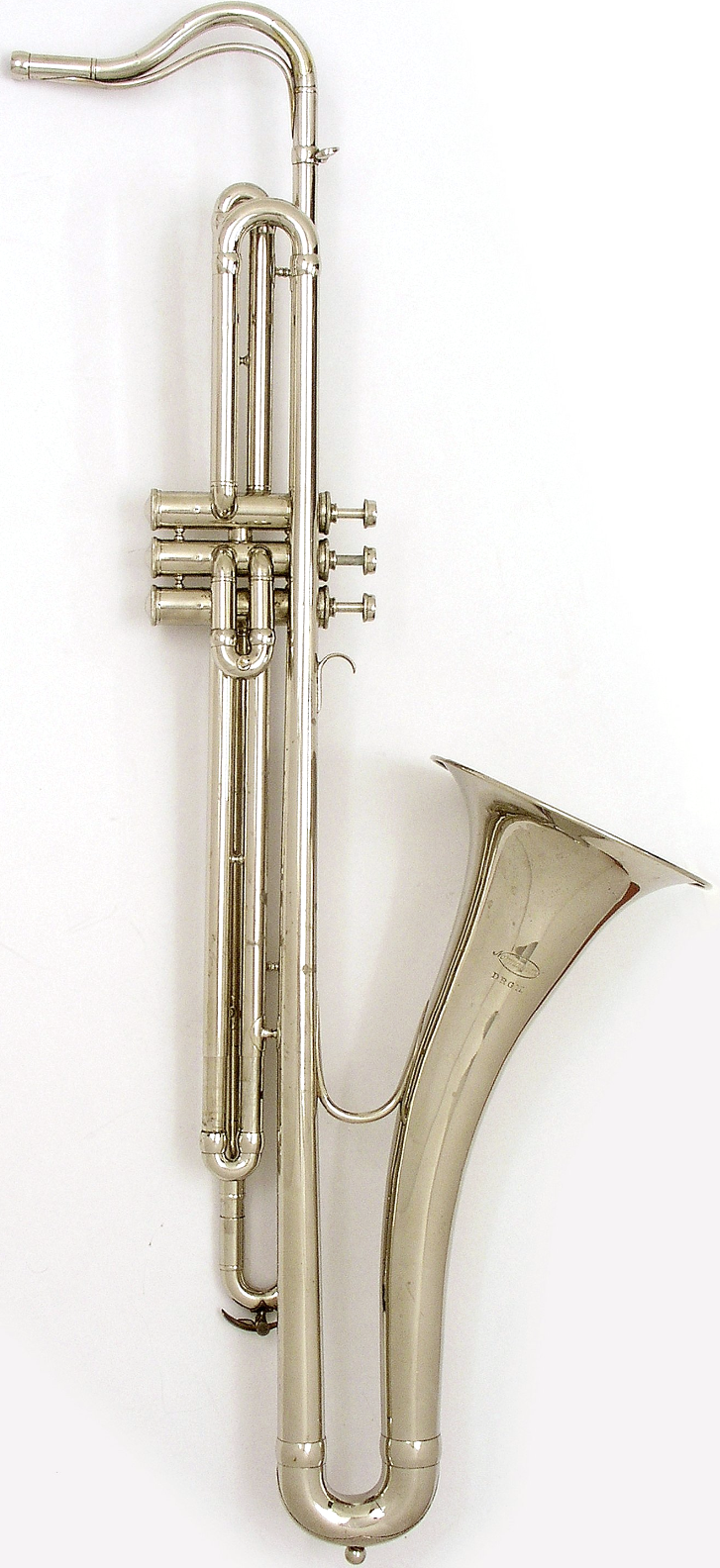
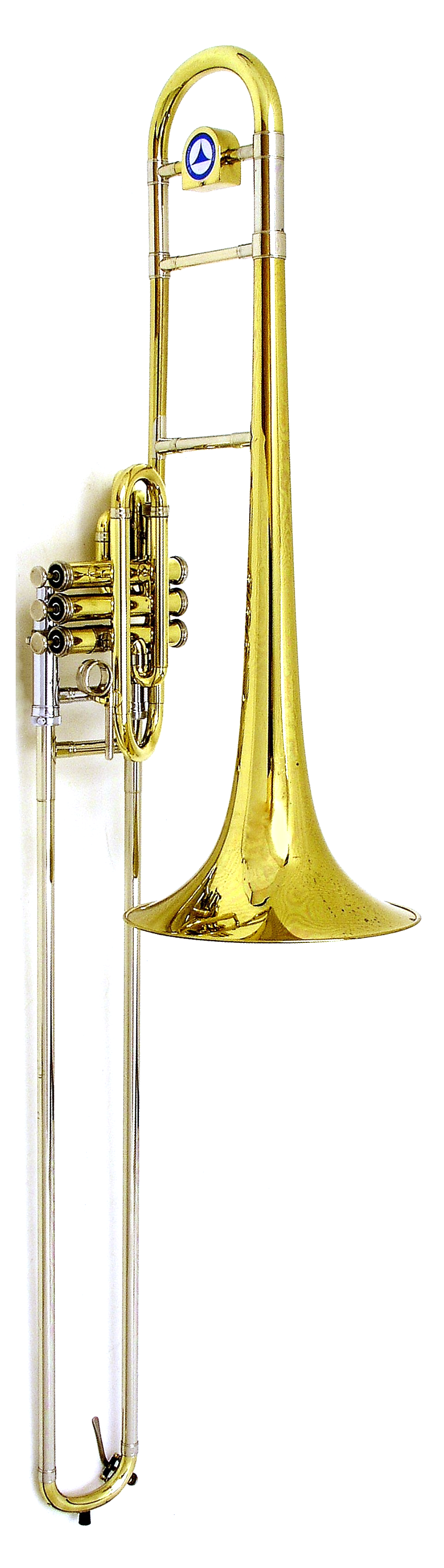
Normaphone c. 1928 by Heber, left; TR-395 superbone by Holton, right (St Cecilia's Hall, University of Edinburgh)

As the B♭ tenor valve trombone uses the same fingering as the B♭ trumpet, it is occasionally a doubling instrument for jazz trumpeters. Notable jazz musicians who play the B♭ tenor valve trombone include Maynard Ferguson, Bob Brookmeyer, Clifford Thornton, Juan Tizol of the Duke Ellington Orchestra, Rob McConnell and Bob Enevoldsen.

In the 1920s a valve trombone reconfigured into a saxophone shape was developed in Germany, called the normaphone (German: Normaphon). It was later taken up by American jazz musicians, including William "Hicky" Kelly in the 1960s and Scott Robinson in the 70s.

== Hybrid slide-valve trombones ==
Duplex or "hybrid" trombones that combine both a slide with a set of valves were built in the late 19th century by Besson and C.G. Conn. In the 1940s, the jazz musician and machinist Brad Gowans invented a "valide" (a portmanteau of "valve" and "slide") with three piston valves and a short four-position slide. In the 1970s, the jazz trumpeter Maynard Ferguson and Larry Ramirez of Holton Musical Instruments developed and patented the Holton TR-395 "Superbone" for Ferguson to use in his band. Similar to the 19th century instruments, it has a very narrow bore of 0.484 inches (12.3 mm) and three piston valves, which Holton manufactured between 1974 and 2004. Subsequent models developed in the early 21st century by the British-Chinese instrument maker Wessex and the Australian jazz musician James Morrison use a larger 0.525-inch (13.3 mm) bore. Morrison's model, built by the Austrian instrument manufacturer Schagerl, has three rotary valves built into the bell section.

== Bibliography ==
- Guion, David M. (2010). A History of the Trombone. Toronto: The Scarecrow Press. ISBN 978-0-8108-7445-9. LCCN 2010000846. OCLC 725775517. OL 24019524M. Wikidata Q111039945.
- Herbert, Trevor (2006). The Trombone. Yale Musical Instrument Series. New Haven: Yale University Press. ISBN 978-0-300-23575-3. OCLC 1007305405. OL 30593699M. Wikidata Q111039091.
- Herbert, Trevor; Myers, Arnold; Wallace, John, eds. (2019). The Cambridge Encyclopedia of Brass Instruments. Cambridge University Press. doi:10.1017/9781316841273. ISBN 978-1-316-63185-0. OL 34730943M. Wikidata Q136027509.
- Yeo, Douglas (2021). An Illustrated Dictionary for the Modern Trombone, Tuba, and Euphonium Player. Dictionaries for the Modern Musician. Peterson, Lennie (illustrator). Lanham: Rowman & Littlefield. ISBN 978-1-5381-5966-8. LCCN 2021020757. OCLC 1249799159. OL 34132790M. Wikidata Q111040546.
