= Jazz Goes to the Movies =

Studio album by Manny Albam
- Released: 1962
- Recorded: January 12 & 25 and February 12, 1962
- Genre: Jazz
- Length: 35:27
- Label: Impulse!

Manny Albam chronology
I Had the Craziest Dream (1961)	Jazz Goes to the Movies (1962)	Brass on Fire (1966)

Jazz Goes to the Movies is an album by American jazz arranger and conductor Manny Albam recorded in 1962 for the Impulse! label.

== Reception ==
The Allmusic review by Ken Dryden awarded the album 4 stars stating "fans of old movie music arranged by a talent like Albam are advised to keep an eye out for it".

Professional ratings
Review scores
Source	Rating
Allmusic	4/5 stars

== Track listing ==
1. "Exodus" (Ernest Gold) – 5:10
2. "High Noon (Do Not Forsake Me)" (Dimitri Tiomkin, Ned Washington) – 2:44
3. "Paris Blues" (Duke Ellington) – 2:42
4. "La Dolce Vita" (Nino Rota) – 2:40
5. "Majority of One" (Max Steiner) – 2:05
6. "Green Leaves of Summer" (Tiomkin, Paul Francis Webster) – 5:56
7. "Guns of Navarone" (Tiomkin) – 3:26
8. "El Cid" (Miklós Rózsa) – 2:25
9. "Slowly" (Kermit Goell, David Raksin) – 4:53

- Recorded in New York City on January 12, 1962 (track 8), January 26, 1962 (tracks 1, 3, 5 & 6) and February 12, 1962 (tracks 2, 4, 7 & 9)

== Personnel ==
- Manny Albam – arranger, conductor
- John Bello (tracks 1, 3, 5 & 6), Johnny Coles (tracks 1, 3, 5, 6 & 8), Al DeRisi (tracks 1, 3, 5, 6 & 8), Bernie Glow (track 8), Joe Newman (tracks 1, 3, 5 & 6), Nick Travis (tracks 2, 4 & 7–9) – trumpet
- Clark Terry – trumpet, flugelhorn (tracks 2, 4, 7 & 9)
- Wayne Andre (tracks 1, 3, 5 & 6), Willie Dennis (tracks 1, 3, 5, 6 & 8), Bill Elton (track 8), Urbie Green (track 8), Alan Raph (tracks 1, 3, 5, 6 & 8) – trombone
- Bob Brookmeyer – valve trombone (tracks 1–7 & 9)
- Julius Watkins – french horn (tracks 2, 4, 7 & 9)
- Harvey Phillips – tuba (tracks 2, 4, 7 & 9)
- Gene Quill (tracks 1, 3, 5 & 6), Phil Woods (tracks 1, 3, 5, 6 & 8) – alto saxophone
- Oliver Nelson (tracks 1–9), Frank Socolow (tracks 1, 3, 5 & 6) – tenor saxophone
- Gene Allen – baritone saxophone (tracks 1–7 & 9)
- George Devens – vibes (track 8)
- Eddie Costa – piano, vibes (tracks 1–7 & 9)
- Jim Hall (tracks 1, 3, 5, 6 & 8), Jimmy Raney (tracks 2, 4, 7 & 9) – guitar
- Bill Crow (tracks 1–7 & 9), George Duvivier (track 8) – bass
- Gus Johnson – drums (tracks 1–9)
