= Historically Speaking =

Historically Speaking may refer to:

- Historically Speaking (Gerry Mulligan album), 1951
- Historically Speaking (Duke Ellington album), 1956
- Historically Speaking (journal), an academic journal and official bulletin of The Historical Society in Boston, Massachusetts
