= Gene Allen =

Gene Allen may refer to:

- Gene Allen (art director) (1918–2015), American art director
- Gene Allen (musician) (1928–2008), American jazz musician
