= California Concerts =

Live album by Gerry Mulligan
- Released: 1955
- Recorded: November 12 and December 14, 1954; Stockton High School, Stockton, CA and Hoover High School, San Diego, CA
- Genre: Jazz
- Label: Pacific Jazz
- Producer: Richard Bock

Gerry Mulligan chronology
Paris Concert (1954)	California Concerts (1955)	Presenting the Gerry Mulligan Sextet (1955)

California Concerts (also referred to as Jazz Goes to High School) is a live album by saxophonist and bandleader Gerry Mulligan featuring performances recorded at the Stockton High School and Hoover High School in California in late 1954 and released on the Pacific Jazz label. The original LP was the first 12-inch LP to be released on the Pacific Jazz label in 1955. The Gerry Mulligan feature track "Polka Dots and Moonbeams" with Bob Brookmeyer on piano was first released on the compilation LP The Genius of Gerry Mulligan in 1960. Although the tracks were recorded at a high school, recording took place on weekends and in the evening. Chet Baker was originally chosen to be the trumpet player of the session, but was jailed for his ongoing heroin addiction, so trumpeter Jon Eardley took Baker's place sounding very similar to Baker. There is a long drum solo performed by Chico Hamilton in the track "A Bark for Barksdale", which impressed the audience enthusiastically.

== Reception ==
Professional ratings
Review scores
Source	Rating
Allmusic	4.5/5 stars
The Penguin Guide to Jazz Recordings	3/4 stars

The Allmusic review by Scott Yanow said, "The music, comprised of standards, some blues and a few Mulligan originals, is quite enjoyable, swinging lightly and with plenty of interplay between the horns".

== Track listing ==
All compositions by Gerry Mulligan except as indicated

Original LP release:

Side one:

1. "Blues Going Up" - 5:32
2. "Little Girl Blue" (Richard Rodgers, Lorenz Hart) - 5:11
3. "Piano Blues" - 5:45
4. "Yardbird Suite" (Charlie Parker) - 6:25
- Recorded at Stockton High School on November 12, 1954

Side two:

1. "Western Reunion" - 7:16
2. "I Know, Don't Know How" - 5:28
3. "The Red Door" (Mulligan, Zoot Sims) - 7:14
- Recorded at Hoover High School on December 14, 1954,

Subsequent CD reissues split the album into two volumes of separate complete concerts

CD reissue - Volume 1: Stockton High School

1. "Blues Going Up" - 5:32
2. "Little Girl Blues" (Rodgers, Hart) - 5:11
3. "Piano Blues" - 5:45
4. "Yardbird Suite" (Parker) - 6:25
5. "Blues for Tiny" (Red Mitchell) - 3:35 Previously released on PJ-8
6. "Soft Shoe" - 3:46 Previously released on JWC-500
7. "Makin' Whoopee" (Walter Donaldson, Gus Kahn) - 3:14 Previously unreleased
8. "Darn That Dream" (Jimmy Van Heusen, Eddie DeLange) - 5:31 Previously unreleased
9. "Ontet" - 4:10 Previously unreleased
10. "A Bark for Barksdale/Crazy Chico" (Mulligan/Chico Hamilton) - 8:18 Previously released on WP-1247

CD reissue - Volume 2: Hoover High School

1. "Makin' Whoopee" (Donaldson, Kahn) - 3:14 Previously unreleased
2. "Nights at the Turntable" - 3:06 Previously unreleased
3. "Blues for Tiny" (Mitchell) - 5:20 Previously unreleased
4. "Frenesí" (Alberto Dominguez) - 3:16 Previously unreleased
5. "Limelight" - 3:44 Previously unreleased
6. "People Will Say We're in Love" (Rodgers, Oscar Hammerstein II) - 4:04 Previously unreleased
7. "Western Reunion" - 7:16
8. "I Know, Don't Know How" - 5:28
9. "The Red Door" (Mulligan, Sims) - 7:14
10. "Polka Dots and Moonbeams" (Van Heusen, Johnny Burke) - 6:59 Previously released on PJ-8
11. "I'll Remember April" (Gene de Paul, Patricia Johnston, Don Raye) - 4:20 Previously unreleased
12. "There Will Never Be Another You" (Harry Warren, Mack Gordon) - 5:37 Previously unreleased
13. "It Don't Mean a Thing (If It Ain't Got That Swing)" (Duke Ellington, Irving Mills) - 3:50 Previously unreleased
14. "Ellington Medley: In a Sentimental Mood/Flamingo/Moon Mist" (Ellington, Manny Kurtz/Ted Grouya/Mercer Ellington) - 5:50 Previously unreleased in full

== Personnel ==
- Gerry Mulligan - baritone saxophone, piano
- Jon Eardley - trumpet
- Bob Brookmeyer - valve trombone, piano (LP Side Two, and Volume 2, tracks 6–14)
- Zoot Sims - tenor saxophone (LP Side Two, and Volume 2, tracks 6–14)
- Red Mitchell - bass
- Larry Bunker (LP Side Two, and Volume 2, tracks 6–14), Chico Hamilton (LP Side One, Volume 1, tracks 1–10, and Volume 2, tracks 1–5) - drums
