= Israel (composition) =

Jazz composition by John Carisi

"Israel " is a composition by John Carisi, which has become a jazz standard. Described as a "minor blues", it was originally recorded in 1949 by Miles Davis as part of the Birth of the Cool sessions. It is considered to be an "early use of the perfect fourth interval", which "arpeggiates a pair of three ascending fourths at mm. 9–10".

"Israel" has since become most associated with jazz pianist Bill Evans, and features on several of the Bill Evans Trio recordings. According to Joe Utterback, Marty Morell's solo work for the Trio on songs such as "Israel" and "Peri's Scope" is "evidence that a drummer can play strongly and fluently without ever losing the melodic line or disrupting the playing of the other musicians". "Israel" was later covered by Gerry Mulligan with his Concert Jazz Band for their 1961 album Gerry Mulligan Presents a Concert in Jazz. Carisi is credited with rearranging the tune especially for Mulligan to make the recording.
