= Jazz Mission to Moscow =

Studio album by Al Cohn
- Released: 1962
- Recorded: July 12, 1962
- Studio: Webster Hall, New York City
- Genre: Jazz
- Length: 30:40
- Label: Colpix; CP/SCP 433
- Producer: Jack Lewis

Al Cohn chronology
Either Way (1961)	Jazz Mission to Moscow (1962)	Al & Zoot in London (1965)

Jazz Mission to Moscow is an album arranged and conducted by Al Cohn featuring Zoot Sims, Phil Woods, Bill Crow, Willie Dennis and Mel Lewis in performances recorded in 1962 following the Benny Goodman Band's tour of the Soviet Union which was released on the RCA Victor label.

== Reception ==
Professional ratings
Review scores
Source	Rating
Allmusic	3/5 stars

The Allmusic review by Scott Yanow called it "An interesting set of modern swing" and noted "In 1962 Benny Goodman had a historic visit to the Soviet Union, touring with a big band full of young all-stars. After the orchestra returned to the U.S., tenor saxophonist Al Cohn (who had not made the trip but did write some of Goodman's charts) put together an album (also released by Colpix) using many of the sidemen and paying tribute to the event".

== Track listing ==
1. "Mission to Moscow" (Mel Powell) – 4:20
2. "The Sochi Boatman" (Traditional) – 5:17
3. "Midnight in Moscow" (Vasily Solovyov-Sedoi, Mikhail Matusovsky) – 5:59
4. "Let's Dance" (Gregory Stone, Josef Bonime, Fanny Baldridge) – 4:32
5. "Russian Lullaby" (Irving Berlin) – 5:39
6. "Red, White and Blue Eyes" (Traditional) – 4:53

== Personnel ==
- Al Cohn – arranger, conductor
- Markie Markowitz, Jimmy Maxwell – trumpet
- Willie Dennis – trombone
- Phil Woods – alto saxophone, clarinet
- Jerry Dodgion – alto saxophone, flute
- Zoot Sims – tenor saxophone
- Gene Allen – baritone saxophone
- Eddie Costa – piano
- Bill Crow – bass
- Mel Lewis – drums
