= What Is There to Say? =

Studio album by Gerry Mulligan
- Released: 1959
- Recorded: Dec 17, 1958–Jan 15, 1959
- Genre: Jazz
- Length: 40:41
- Label: Columbia
- Producer: Teo Macero

Gerry Mulligan chronology
Annie Ross Sings a Song with Mulligan! (1958)	What Is There to Say? (1959)	Gerry Mulligan Meets Johnny Hodges (1959)

What Is There to Say? is a 1959 album by Gerry Mulligan.

== Reception ==
Professional ratings
Review scores
Source	Rating
Allmusic	5/5 stars
Encyclopedia of Popular Music	5/5 stars
The Penguin Guide to Jazz Recordings	4/4 stars

Allmusic's Scott Yanow states: "The last of the pianoless quartet albums that Gerry Mulligan recorded in the 1950s is one of the best", and observes that "Virtually every selection is memorable, with 'What Is There to Say,' 'Just in Time,' 'Festive Minor,' 'My Funny Valentine,' and 'Utter Chaos' being the high points".

== Track listing ==
All tracks composed by Gerry Mulligan except where indicated

1. "What Is There to Say?" (Vernon Duke, E.Y. "Yip" Harburg) – 4:03
2. "Just in Time" (Jule Styne, Betty Comden, Adolph Green) – 4:11
3. "News from Blueport" (Art Farmer) – 5:03
4. "Festive Minor" – 6:14
5. "As Catch Can" – 3:54
6. "My Funny Valentine" (Richard Rodgers, Lorenz Hart) – 4:06
7. "Blueport" (Bill Crow) – 8:47
8. "Utter Chaos" – 4:23

== Recording dates ==
17 December 1958 (7); 23 December 1958 (5, 6, 8); 15 January 1959 (1, 2, 3, 4)

== Personnel ==
- Gerry Mulligan - baritone saxophone
- Art Farmer - trumpet
- Bill Crow - bass
- Dave Bailey - drums
