= Blue Hodge =

Music album by Johnny Hodges

Studio album by Johnny Hodges
- Released: 1961
- Recorded: August 23 & 24, 1961
- Studio: Van Gelder Studio, Englewood Cliffs, NJ
- Genre: Jazz
- Label: Verve V/V6 8406
- Producer: Creed Taylor

Johnny Hodges chronology
Gerry Mulligan Meets Johnny Hodges (1959)	Blue Hodge (1961)	Johnny Hodges with Billy Strayhorn and the Orchestra (1961)

Blue Hodge is an album recorded by American jazz saxophonist Johnny Hodges featuring performances recorded in 1961 and released on the Verve label.

== Reception ==
Professional ratings
Review scores
Source	Rating
Allmusic	3/5 stars

The Allmusic site awarded the album 3 stars. Blue Hodge was the first of eight LPs released between 1961 and 1967 that featured Johnny Hodges and Wild Bill Davis in a small-group jazz context. While most of the Hodges-Davis sessions feature a mix of traditional popular music standards and jazz compositions written by Hodges, Duke Ellington, and musicians associated with Duke Ellington, Blue Hodge features three compositions by Gary McFarland. McFarland was still relatively unknown at the time of the recording, though during the next two years, he arranged albums for Stan Getz and Bill Evans that allowed him to launch his own recording career. Also notable is the presence of Sam Jones on bass and Louis Hayes on drums, both of whom were in the midst of a several-year stint as the part of the Cannonball Adderley Quintet.

== Track listing ==
1. "And Then Some" (Johnny Hodges) - 4:00
2. "I Wonder Why" (Mercer Ellington) - 4:26
3. "Azure Te" (Duke Ellington, Irving Mills) - 2:55
4. "Blue Hodge" (Gary McFarland) - 6:21
5. "Hodge Podge" (Duke Ellington, Johnny Hodges) - 4:00
6. "It Shouldn't Happen to a Dream" (Duke Ellington, Don George, Johnny Hodges) - 2:08
7. "Why Are You Blue?" (McFarland) - 2:23
8. "Knuckles" (McFarland) - 5:09
9. "Stand By Blues" (Johnny Hodges) - 4:27
10. "There Is No Greater Love" (Isham Jones, Marty Symes) - 3:24

== Personnel ==
- Johnny Hodges - alto saxophone
- Wild Bill Davis - organ
- Les Spann - guitar, flute
- Sam Jones - bass
- Louis Hayes - drums
