= Gerry Mulligan and the Concert Jazz Band at the Village Vanguard =

Live album by Gerry Mulligan
- Released: 1961
- Recorded: December 11, 1960
- Venue: Village Vanguard, New York City
- Genre: Jazz
- Length: 40:51
- Label: Verve MGV 8396

Gerry Mulligan chronology
Gerry Mulligan and the Concert Jazz Band on Tour (1960)	Gerry Mulligan and the Concert Jazz Band at the Village Vanguard (1961)	Holliday with Mulligan (1961)

Gerry Mulligan and the Concert Jazz Band at the Village Vanguard is a live album by jazz saxophonist and bandleader Gerry Mulligan featuring performances recorded at the Village Vanguard in late 1960 which were released on the Verve label.

== Reception ==
Professional ratings
Review scores
Source	Rating
AllMusic	5/5 stars
DownBeat	5/5 stars
Encyclopedia of Popular Music	4/5 stars
The Penguin Guide to Jazz Recordings	3.5/4 stars

The contemporaneous DownBeat reviewer praised both the audio quality and the music, commenting: "Musically, the disc has everything, including superb ensemble playing and solos of consistently high quality". AllMusic awarded the album 5 stars stating: "Of all the recordings made by Gerry Mulligan's Concert Jazz Band in the 1960s, this is the definitive one. ...This music is essential". On All About Jazz Joel Roberts commented: "What sets this ensemble apart isn't so much the compositions (though they're a fine mix of standards and originals) or even the star quality of the soloists (though Mulligan, Clark Terry, Bob Brookmeyer and others provide some memorable solo moments). The key is the cohesiveness of the band as a unit and the crisp, tight arrangements and orchestrations by Mulligan, Brookmeyer and Al Cohn... Mulligan was no avant gardist, but he knew how to push the limits while working within a straight-ahead context, and he knew how to make a band swing".

== Track listing ==
1. "Blueport" (Art Farmer) - 11:07
2. "Body and Soul" (Johnny Green, Frank Eyton, Edward Heyman, Robert Sour) - 5:45
3. "Black Nightgown" (Johnny Mandel) - 4:10
4. "Come Rain or Come Shine" (Harold Arlen, Johnny Mercer) - 5:35
5. "Lady Chatterley's Mother" (Al Cohn) - 6:14
6. "Let My People Be" (Gerry Mulligan) - 8:00

== Personnel ==
- Gerry Mulligan - baritone saxophone, piano (track 6)
- Don Ferrara, Clark Terry, Nick Travis - trumpet
- Willie Dennis - trombone
- Alan Raph - bass trombone
- Bob Brookmeyer - valve trombone
- Bob Donovan - alto saxophone
- Gene Quill - alto saxophone, clarinet
- Jim Reider - tenor saxophone
- Gene Allen - baritone saxophone, bass clarinet
- Bill Crow - bass
- Mel Lewis - drums
