= If You Can't Beat 'Em, Join 'Em! =

Studio album by Gerry Mulligan
- Released: 1965
- Recorded: July 22, 26, 27 & 28, 1965
- Studio: Radio Recorders, Hollywood, California
- Genre: Jazz
- Length: 33:46
- Label: Limelight LS 86021
- Producer: Jack Tracy

Gerry Mulligan chronology
Butterfly with Hiccups (1964)	If You Can't Beat 'Em, Join 'Em! (1965)	Feelin' Good (1965)

If You Can't Beat 'Em, Join 'Em! is an album by American jazz saxophonist Gerry Mulligan featuring performances recorded in 1965 and first released on the Limelight label.

== Reception ==
Professional ratings
Review scores
Source	Rating
AllMusic	3/5 stars

AllMusic awarded the album 3 stars and its review by Ken Dryen states, "Many jazz musicians were frustrated with the public's focus on rock & roll and pop music in general at the time this recording was made. So Mulligan, like many other jazzmen, decided to take a few of the hits and recast them in a jazz setting. ...of borderline interest to serious fans of Gerry Mulligan, due to the uneven material and a supporting cast that is not up to the level one expects on the baritone saxophonist's records".

== Track listing ==
1. "King of the Road" (Roger Miller) - 2:32
2. "Engine, Engine No. 9" (Miller) - 3:53
3. "Hush, Hush, Sweet Charlotte" (Frank De Vol, Mack David) - 4:02
4. "I Know a Place" (Tony Hatch) - 3:25
5. "Can't Buy Me Love" (John Lennon, Paul McCartney) - 3:34
6. "A Hard Day's Night" (Lennon, McCartney) - 3:51
7. "If I Fell" (Lennon, McCartney) - 3:12
8. "Downtown" (Hatch) - 2:30
9. "Mr. Tambourine Man" (Bob Dylan) - 3:17
10. "If You Can't Beat 'em, Join 'em" (Gerry Mulligan) - 3:30

== Personnel ==
- Gerry Mulligan - baritone saxophone
- Pete Jolly - piano
- Johnny Gray - guitar
- Jimmy Bond - bass
- Hal Blaine - drums
