= I Want to Live! (soundtrack) =

Soundtrack album by Johnny Mandel/Gerry Mulligan Jazz Combo
- Released: 1958
- Recorded: May 1958
- Genre: Film score
- Label: United Artists; UAL 4005 & UAL 4006

Johnny Mandel chronology
I Want to Live! (1958)	The 3rd Voice (1960)

Gerry Mulligan chronology
Reunion with Chet Baker (1957)	I Want to Live! (1958)	Annie Ross Sings a Song with Mulligan! (1958)

Jazz Combo Cover

Professional ratings
Review scores
Source	Rating
Allmusic	4.5/5 stars

I Want to Live!' is the debut film score composed, arranged and conducted by Johnny Mandel, for the 1958 film of the same name directed by Robert Wise. In addition to Mandel's score, the film features jazz themes performed by Gerry Mulligan's Jazz Combo. Two soundtrack albums were released on the United Artists label in 1958. Mandel was nominated for the Grammy Award for Best Sound Track Album or Recording of Original Cast From a Motion Picture or Television at the inaugural 1st Annual Grammy Awards in 1959; he lost to André Previn's score for Gigi.

== Reception ==
Allmusic's Stephen Cook noted, "Johnny Mandel's I Want to Live soundtrack works both as high-end mood music and swinging jazz. ...the most intriguing cuts are those that seamlessly combine jazz, Latin percussion, and strains of Max Steiner's dramatically moody soundtracks ...And as far as murky ambience goes, he delivers some of the best (next to Mancini) ...To help navigate the vast terrain, Mandel enlists a cadre of top West Coast players like trumpeter Jack Sheldon, trombonist Frank Rosolino, reed player Bill Holman, bassist Red Mitchell, and drummer Shelly Manne. And topping off Mandel's original score, ... Gerry Mulligan and Art Farmer's combo interpretations of a handful of Mandel's original themes from the movie (Mulligan and company appear in the movie's bar scenes). One of the best jazz-inspired soundtracks around".

== Track listing ==
Johnny Mandel's Great Jazz Score:

1. "Main Title" - 1:21
2. "Poker Game" - 1:36
3. "San Diego Party" - 4:08
4. "Henry Leaves" - 1:39
5. "Stakeout" - 4:01
6. "Barbara Surrenders" - 2:05
7. "Trio Convicted" - 1:11
8. "Trip to Corona" - 1:28
9. "Peg's Visit" - 2:36
10. "Gas Chamber Unveiling" - 1:03
11. "Nightmare Sequence" - 1:08
12. "Preparations for Execution" - 2:50
13. "Letter Writing Sequence" - 1:25
14. "The Last Mile" - 1:48
15. "Death Scene" - 1:04
16. "End Title" - 0:56

The Jazz Combo from I Want to Live!:

1. "Black Nightgown" - 3:33
2. "Theme from "I Want to Live"" - 6:54
3. "Night Watch" - 3:55
4. "Frisco Club" - 4:43
5. "Barbara's Theme" - 4:39
6. "Life's a Funny Thing" - 7:44

=== Personnel ===
Johnny Mandel's Great Jazz Score:

- Al Porcino, Ed Leddy, Jack Sheldon - trumpet
- Frank Rosolino, Milt Bernhart - trombone
- Dave Wells - trombone, bass trumpet
- John Cave, Dick Parisi, Sinclair Lott, Vincent DeRosa - French horn
- Harry Klee - flute, piccolo
- Abe Most - clarinet
- Joe Maini - alto saxophone, bass clarinet
- Bill Holman - tenor saxophone, clarinet
- Gerry Mulligan - baritone saxophone
- Marty Berman - bass clarinet, contrabassoon
- Chuck Gentry - bass saxophone, contrabass clarinet
- Al Hendricksen - guitar
- Kathryn Julye - harp
- Pete Jolly - piano
- Red Mitchell - bass
- Shelly Manne - drums, percussion
- Larry Bunker, Mel Lewis, Mike Pacheco, Milt Holland - percussion
- Johnny Mandel - arranger, conductor

On The Jazz Combo from I Want to Live!:

- Gerry Mulligan - baritone saxophone
- Art Farmer - trumpet
- Frank Rosolino - trombone
- Bud Shank - alto saxophone, flute
- Pete Jolly - piano
- Red Mitchell - bass
- Shelly Manne - drums
- Johnny Mandel - arranger

== Charts ==
Chart (1959)	Peak position
US Billboard Best Selling Monophonic LP's	39
