= Gerry Mulligan Meets Stan Getz =

Studio album by Gerry Mulligan and Stan Getz
- Released: 1957
- Recorded: October 12, 1957; Los Angeles, California
- Genre: Jazz
- Length: 54:18
- Label: Verve MGV 8249
- Producer: Norman Granz

Stan Getz chronology
Stan Getz and the Oscar Peterson Trio (1957)	Gerry Mulligan Meets Stan Getz (1957)	Stan Getz and J. J. Johnson at the Opera House (1957)

Gerry Mulligan chronology
Blues in Time (1957)	Gerry Mulligan Meets Stan Getz (1957)	Jazz Concerto Grosso (1957)

Getz Meets Mulligan in Hi-Fi Cover

Professional ratings
Review scores
Source	Rating
AllMusic	3/5 stars
Disc	4/5 stars
DownBeat	4/5 stars
The Encyclopedia of Popular Music	4/5 stars
The Penguin Guide to Jazz Recordings	3/4 stars

Gerry Mulligan Meets Stan Getz (also released as Getz Meets Mulligan in Hi-Fi) is an album by American jazz saxophonists Gerry Mulligan and Stan Getz featuring performances recorded in 1957 released on the Verve label.

== Track listing ==
1. "Let's Fall in Love" (Harold Arlen, Ted Koehler) – 6:25
2. "Anything Goes" (Cole Porter) – 3:35
3. "Too Close for Comfort" (Jerry Bock, Larry Holofcener, George David Weiss) – 6:54
4. "That Old Feeling" (Sammy Fain, Lew Brown) – 5:55
5. "This Can't Be Love" (Richard Rodgers, Lorenz Hart) – 8:44
6. "A Ballad" (Gerry Mulligan) – 5:41
7. "Scrapple from the Apple" (Charlie Parker) – 8:05 Bonus track on CD reissue
8. "I Didn't Know What Time It Was" (Rogers, Hart) – 8:59 Bonus track on CD reissue

Tracks 7 and 8 originally appeared on an LP with Oscar Peterson trio tracks comprising Side B (MGV-8348)

== Personnel ==
- Gerry Mulligan - baritone saxophone (tracks 4–8), tenor saxophone (tracks 1–3)
- Stan Getz - tenor saxophone (tracks 4–8), baritone saxophone (tracks 1–3)
- Lou Levy - piano
- Ray Brown - bass
- Stan Levey - drums
