= The Gerry Mulligan Quartet (1962 album) =

Studio album / Live album by Gerry Mulligan Quartet
- Released: 1962
- Recorded: February 25 and May 14 & 15, 1962
- Studio: Village Vanguard and Nola Penthouse Studio, NYC
- Genre: Jazz
- Length: 34:50
- Label: Verve V/V6 8466
- Producer: Jim Davis

Gerry Mulligan chronology
Gerry Mulligan Presents a Concert in Jazz (1961)	The Gerry Mulligan Quartet (1962)	Jeru (1962)

The Gerry Mulligan Quartet is an album recorded by American jazz saxophonist and bandleader Gerry Mulligan featuring performances recorded in 1962 (with one track from a live recording at the Village Vanguard) which were released on the Verve label.

== Reception ==
Professional ratings
Review scores
Source	Rating
Allmusic	4/5 stars

Allmusic awarded the album 4 stars stating "The interplay between Mulligan and Brookmeyer rekindles the magic of their work together a half dozen years earlier".

== Track listing ==
All compositions by Gerry Mulligan except as indicated

1. "I'm Getting Sentimental Over You" (George Bassman, Ned Washington) - 5:01
2. "Piano Train" - 6:07
3. "Lost in the Stars" (Kurt Weill, Maxwell Anderson) - 5:33
4. "I Believe in You" (Frank Loesser) - 4:36
5. "Love in New Orleans" - 5:43
6. "I Know, Don't Know How" - 7:50
- Recorded at the Village Vanguard on February 25, 1962 (track 6) and Nola Penthouse Studio, NYC on May 14 & 15, 1962 (tracks 1–5)

== Personnel ==
- Gerry Mulligan - baritone saxophone
- Bob Brookmeyer - valve trombone, piano track 2
- Bill Crow - bass
- Gus Johnson - drums
