= Presenting the Gerry Mulligan Sextet =

Studio album by Gerry Mulligan
- Released: 1955
- Recorded: September 21, and October 22 & 31, 1955; New York City
- Genre: Jazz
- Length: 44:18
- Label: EmArcy

Gerry Mulligan chronology
California Concerts (1954)	Presenting the Gerry Mulligan Sextet (1955)	Mainstream of Jazz (1956)

Presenting the Gerry Mulligan Sextet is an album led by baritone saxophonist Gerry Mulligan featuring tracks recorded in 1955 and released on the EmArcy label.

== Reception ==
Professional ratings
Review scores
Source	Rating
Allmusic	4/5 stars
Encyclopedia of Popular Music	4/5 stars

Allmusic awarded the album 4 stars, calling it "Fun swinging music that is still quite accessible".

== Track listing ==
All compositions by Gerry Mulligan except as indicated

1. "Mud Bug" (Jerry Lloyd) - 5:03
2. "Sweet and Lovely" (Gus Arnheim, Harry Tobias, Jules LeMare) - 2:40
3. "Apple Core" - 5:23
4. "Nights on the Turntable" - 4:33
5. "Broadway" (Billy Byrd, Teddy McRae, Henri Woode) - 6:31
6. "Everything Happens to Me" (Matt Dennis, Tom Adair) - 5:18
7. "The Lady Is a Tramp" (Richard Rodgers, Lorenz Hart) - 5:00
8. "Bernie's Tune" (Bernie Miller, Jerry Leiber, Mike Stoller) - 6:37
- Recorded in New York City on September 21, (tracks 1 & 8), October 22 (tracks 2 & 3) and October 31 (tracks 4–7), 1955

== Personnel ==
- Gerry Mulligan - baritone saxophone
- Jon Eardley - trumpet
- Bob Brookmeyer - valve trombone, piano on track 6
- Zoot Sims - tenor saxophone
- Peck Morrison - bass
- Dave Bailey - drums
