= Recorded in Boston at Storyville =

Live album by Gerry Mulligan Quartet
- Released: 1957
- Recorded: December 6, 1956
- Venues: Storyville, Boston, Massachusetts
- Genre: Jazz
- Length: 69:10
- Label: Pacific Jazz
- Producer: Richard Bock

Gerry Mulligan chronology
Mainstream of Jazz (1956)	Recorded in Boston at Storyville (1957)	The Arranger (1957)

Recorded in Boston at Storyville (often simply called At Storyville) is a live album by the Gerry Mulligan Quartet from performances recorded at the Storyville nightclub in late 1956 and released by Pacific Jazz.

== Reception ==
Professional ratings
Review scores
Source	Rating
Allmusic	4.5/5 stars
The Penguin Guide to Jazz Recordings	3/4 stars

The Allmusic review by Scott Yanow called it "A fine all-round performance from this cool-toned bop unit".

== Track listing ==
All compositions by Gerry Mulligan except as indicated

1. "Bweebida Bwobbida" - 6:38
2. "The Birth of the Blues" (Ray Henderson, Lew Brown, Buddy DeSylva) - 4:36
3. "Baubles, Bangles and Beads" (George Forrest, Robert Wright) - 3:27
4. "Rustic Hop" (Bob Brookmeyer) - 4:50
5. "Open Country" (Brookmeyer) - 5:43
6. "Storyville Story" - 5:35
7. "That Old Feeling" (Sammy Fain, Brown) - 4:06
8. "Bike Up the Strand/Utter Chaos" - 6:20
  Bonus tracks on CD reissue
9. "Blues at the Roots" - 4:54
10. "Ide's Side" - 5:10
11. "I Can't Get Started" (Vernon Duke, Ira Gershwin) - 2:42
12. "Frenesi" (Alberto Domínguez) - 4:25
13. "Flash" - 2:43
14. "Honeysuckle Rose" (Fats Waller, Andy Razaf) - 3:19
15. "Limelight/Utter Chaos" - 4:42

== Personnel ==
- Gerry Mulligan – baritone saxophone, piano
- Bob Brookmeyer – valve trombone, piano
- Bill Crow – double bass
- Dave Bailey – drums
