= Something Borrowed - Something Blue =

Studio album by Gerry Mulligan
- Released: 1966
- Recorded: July 19, 1966
- Studio: Bell Sound (New York City)
- Genre: Jazz
- Label: Limelight LS 86040
- Producer: Hal Mooney

Gerry Mulligan chronology
Feelin' Good (1965)	Something Borrowed - Something Blue (1966)	Compadres (1968)

Something Borrowed - Something Blue is an album by American jazz saxophonist Gerry Mulligan featuring performances recorded in 1966 and first released on the Limelight label.

== Reception ==
Professional ratings
Review scores
Source	Rating
AllMusic	3/5 stars

AllMusic awarded the album 3 stars with its review by Scott Yanow stating, "This unusual quintet set finds Gerry Mulligan playing alto rather than baritone on four of the six selections. ...swinging music with plenty of fine moments".

== Track listing ==
All compositions by Gerry Mulligan except as indicated

1. "Davenport Blues" (Bix Beiderbecke) - 7:29
2. "Sometime Ago" (Sergio Mihánovich) - 5:36
3. "Take Tea and See" - 7:02
4. "Spring Is Sprung" - 6:38
5. "New Orleans" (Hoagy Carmichael) - 5:30
6. "Decidedly" - 7:34

== Personnel ==
- Gerry Mulligan - baritone saxophone (tracks 1 & 2), alto saxophone (tracks 3–6)
- Zoot Sims - tenor saxophone
- Warren Bernhardt - piano
- Eddie Gomez - bass
- Dave Bailey - drums
