= Spring Is Sprung =

Studio album by Gerry Mulligan Quartet
- Released: 1963
- Recorded: December 11 & 12, 1962
- Studio: A&R Studios, New York City
- Genre: Jazz
- Length: 37:12
- Label: Philips PHS 600-077
- Producer: Quincy Jones

Gerry Mulligan chronology
Two of a Mind (1962)	Spring Is Sprung (1963)	Gerry Mulligan '63 (1963)

Spring Is Sprung is an album by American jazz saxophonist Gerry Mulligan's Quartet featuring performances recorded in late 1962 and first released on the Philips label.

== Reception ==
Professional ratings
Review scores
Source	Rating
AllMusic	4/5 stars

AllMusic awarded the album 4 stars stating: "Mulligan and Brookmeyer always seem to stimulate one another's playing to a high level, and this album is no exception".

== Track listing ==
All compositions by Gerry Mulligan except as indicated

1. "Jive at Five" (Count Basie, Harry Edison) - 6:24
2. "Four for Three" - 4:58
3. "17 Mile Drive" - 4:57
4. "Subterranean Blues" - 9:41
5. "Spring Is Sprung" - 6:42
6. "Open Country" (Bob Brookmeyer) - 4:30

== Personnel ==
- Gerry Mulligan - baritone saxophone, piano, track 5
- Bob Brookmeyer - valve trombone, piano, track 4
- Bill Crow - bass
- Gus Johnson - drums
