= Annie Ross Sings a Song with Mulligan! =

Studio album by Annie Ross and Gerry Mulligan
- Released: 1959
- Recorded: December 11 & 12, 1957 and September 25, 1958; New York City
- Genre: Jazz
- Length: 59:24
- Label: World Pacific WP 1253
- Producer: Richard Bock

Annie Ross chronology
A Gasser! (1958)	Annie Ross Sings a Song with Mulligan! (1959)	Sings a Handful of Songs (1963)

Gerry Mulligan chronology
I Want to Live! (1958)	Annie Ross Sings a Song with Mulligan! (1959)	What Is There to Say? (1959)

Annie Ross Sings a Song with Mulligan! is an album by vocalist Annie Ross with jazz saxophonist and bandleader Gerry Mulligan featuring performances recorded in 1957 and 1958 which were released on the World Pacific label.

== Reception ==
Professional ratings
Review scores
Source	Rating
Allmusic	5/5 stars

The Allmusic review by Scott Yanow stated: "Singer Annie Ross' first solo album after joining Lambert, Hendricks & Ross finds her at the peak of her powers. ...all the selections are quite rewarding and her interplay with baritonist Mulligan is consistently memorable."

== Track listing ==
1. "I Feel Pretty" (Leonard Bernstein, Stephen Sondheim) - 3:32
2. "I've Grown Accustomed to Your Face" (Frederick Loewe, Alan Jay Lerner) - 3:01
3. "All of You" (Cole Porter) - 2:19
4. "Give Me the Simple Life" (Rube Bloom, Harry Ruby) - 3:35
5. "This Is Always" (Harry Warren, Mack Gordon) - 4:21
6. "My Old Flame" (Arthur Johnston, Sam Coslow) - 3:50 Bonus track on CD reissue
7. "This Time the Dream's on Me" (Harold Arlen, Johnny Mercer) - 3:23
8. "Let There Be Love" (Lionel Rand, Ian Grant) - 3:43
9. "Between the Devil and the Deep Blue Sea" (Arlen, Ted Koehler) - 3:41
10. "How About You?" (Burton Lane, Ralph Freed) - 2:50
11. "I Guess I'll Have to Change My Plan" (Arthur Schwartz, Howard Dietz) - 2:25 Bonus track on CD reissue
12. "This Is Always" [alternate take] (Warren, Gordon) - 3:59 Bonus track on CD reissue
13. "It Don't Mean a Thing (If It Ain't Got That Swing)" (Duke Ellington, Irving Mills) - 2:09
14. "The Lady's in Love with You" (Burton Lane, Frank Loesser) - 2:25 Bonus track on CD reissue
15. "You Turned the Tables on Me" (Louis Alter, Sidney D. Mitchell) - 3:24 Bonus track on CD reissue
16. "I've Grown Accustomed to Your Face" [alternate take] (Loewe, Lerner) - 3:05 Bonus track on CD reissue
- Recorded in New York City on December 11 & 12, 1957 (tracks 7–16) and September 25, 1958 (tracks 1–6).

== Personnel ==
- Annie Ross – vocals
- Gerry Mulligan – baritone saxophone
- Art Farmer – trumpet (tracks 1–6)
- Chet Baker – trumpet (tracks 7–16)
- Bill Crow – bass (tracks 1–6)
- Henry Grimes – bass (tracks 7–16)
- Dave Bailey – drums
