= Mainstream of Jazz =

Studio album by Gerry Mulligan Sextet
- Released: 1956
- Recorded: January 25 and September 26, 1956
- Genre: Jazz
- Length: 54:18
- Label: EmArcy

Gerry Mulligan chronology
Presenting the Gerry Mulligan Sextet (1955)	Mainstream of Jazz (1956)	Recorded in Boston at Storyville (1956)

Mainstream of Jazz is an album led by American jazz baritone saxophonist Gerry Mulligan with tracks recorded in 1956 which were released by EmArcy.

== Reception ==
Professional ratings
Review scores
Source	Rating
Down Beat	5 stars
Allmusic	4/5 stars

Allmusic awarded the album 4 stars stating "this was a classic West Coast style jazz band and each of its recordings are worth acquiring".

== Track listing ==
All compositions by Gerry Mulligan except as indicated

1. "Elevation" (Elliot Lawrence, Mulligan) - 6:51
2. "Mainstream" - 6:49
3. "Ain't It the Truth" (Count Basie) - 5:23
4. "Igloo" (Jerry Lloyd) - 6:57
5. "Blue at the Roots" - 5:46
6. "Lollypop" (Chico Hamilton, Gerald Wiggins) - 5:48
- Recorded in New York City on January 25, 1956 (tracks 2 & 3) and September 26, 1956 (tracks 1 & 4–6)

== Personnel ==
- Gerry Mulligan – baritone saxophone, piano
- Jon Eardley – trumpet (2,3)
- Don Ferrara – trumpet (1,4-6)
- Bob Brookmeyer – valve trombone
- Zoot Sims – tenor saxophone
- Bill Crow – double bass (1–4,6)
- Peck Morrison - double bass (5)
- Dave Bailey – drums
