= Gerry Mulligan and the Concert Jazz Band on Tour =

Live album by Gerry Mulligan
- Released: 1962
- Recorded: October 1 and November 4 & 14, 1960; Santa Monica Civic Auditorium, CA, West Berlin, West Germany and Teatro Lirico, Milan, Italy
- Genre: Jazz
- Length: 40:39
- Label: Verve V/V6 8438

Gerry Mulligan chronology
The Concert Jazz Band (1960)	Gerry Mulligan and the Concert Jazz Band on Tour (1962)	Gerry Mulligan and the Concert Jazz Band at the Village Vanguard (1960)

Gerry Mulligan and the Concert Jazz Band on Tour (subtitled Guest Soloist: Zoot Sims) is a live album recorded by American jazz saxophonist and bandleader Gerry Mulligan featuring performances recorded in California, Berlin and Milan 1960 which were released on the Verve label. In the CD era it has been superseded by The Complete Santa Monica Concert

== Reception ==
Professional ratings
Review scores
Source	Rating
Allmusic	4.5/5 stars
Encyclopedia of Popular Music	4/5 stars

The Allmusic site awarded the album 4½ stars calling it a "highly recommended album" and stating "Tenor saxophonist Zoot Sims, who had previously toured with Mulligan's sextet and always swings effortlessly, is featured as a special guest on several of the selections".

== Track listing ==
1. "Go Home" (Ben Webster) - 7:27
2. "Barbara's Theme" (Johnny Mandel) - 5:17
3. "I Want to Live" (Mandel) - 6:57
4. "Red Door" (Zoot Sims, Gerry Mulligan) - 5:32
5. "Come Rain or Come Shine" (Harold Arlen, Johnny Mercer) - 4:41
6. "Apple Core" (Mulligan) - 5:05
7. "Go Home" (Webster) - 5:40
- Recorded at Santa Monica Civic Auditorium, CA on October 1, 1960 (tracks 4, 5 & 7), West Berlin in West Germany on November 4, 1960 (track 3) and the Teatro Lirico in Milan, Italy on November 14, 1960 (tracks 1, 2 & 6)

== Personnel ==
- Gerry Mulligan - baritone saxophone
- Conte Candoli, Don Ferrara, Nick Travis - trumpet
- Willie Dennis - trombone
- Alan Raph - bass trombone
- Bob Brookmeyer - valve trombone, piano track 4
- Bob Donovan - alto saxophone
- Gene Quill - alto saxophone, clarinet
- Jim Reider, Zoot Sims (full feature on tracks 5 and 6) - tenor saxophone
- Gene Allen - baritone saxophone, bass clarinet
- Buddy Clark - bass
- Mel Lewis - drums
- Bill Holman (tracks 1, 6 & 7), Johnny Mandel (tracks 2 & 3), Gerry Mulligan (track 5) - arranger
