= Gerry Mulligan Presents a Concert in Jazz =

Studio album by Gerry Mulligan
- Released: 1961
- Recorded: July 10 & 11, 1961; Webster Hall, NYC
- Genre: Jazz
- Length: 33:10
- Label: Verve V/V6 8415
- Producer: Jim Davies

Gerry Mulligan chronology
Holliday with Mulligan (1961)	Gerry Mulligan Presents a Concert in Jazz (1961)	The Gerry Mulligan Quartet (1962)

Gerry Mulligan Presents a Concert in Jazz is an album recorded by American jazz saxophonist and bandleader Gerry Mulligan featuring performances recorded in 1961 which were released on the Verve label.

== Reception ==
Professional ratings
Review scores
Source	Rating
Allmusic	4.5/5 stars

Allmusic awarded the album 4½ stars stating: "Gerry Mulligan's third LP to feature his Concert Jazz Band is one of his best efforts, because the concert repertoire recorded during this pair of 1961 studio sessions was written specifically for his group".

== Track listing ==
All compositions by Gerry Mulligan except as indicated

1. "All About Rosie" (George Russell) - 9:38
2. "Weep" (Gary McFarland) - 5:57
3. "I Know, Don't Know How" - 5:18
4. "Chuggin'" (McFarland) - 4:42
5. "Summer's Over" - 4:29
6. "Israel" (John Carisi) - 3:06

== Personnel ==
- Gerry Mulligan - baritone saxophone, piano - track 4
- Don Ferrara, Doc Severinsen, Nick Travis - trumpet
- Willie Dennis - trombone
- Alan Raph - bass trombone
- Bob Brookmeyer - valve trombone, arranger
- Bob Donovan - alto saxophone, flute
- Gene Quill - alto saxophone, clarinet
- Jim Reider - tenor saxophone
- Gene Allen - baritone saxophone, bass clarinet
- Bill Crow - bass
- Mel Lewis - drums
- George Russell (track 1), Gary McFarland (tracks 2 & 4), Johnny Carisi (track 6) - arranger
