= Willie Dennis =

American jazz musician (1926–1965)

- Birth name: William DeBerardinis
- Born: January 10, 1926; Philadelphia, Pennsylvania
- Died: July 8, 1965 (aged 39); New York City, New York
- Genres: Jazz, bebop
- Occupation: Trombonist
- Instrument: Trombone
- Years active: 1946–1965
- Labels: Debut Records

Willie Dennis (née William DeBerardinis, January 10, 1926 – July 8, 1965) was an American jazz trombonist known as a big band musician but who was also an excellent bebop soloist.

== Career ==
After working with Elliot Lawrence, Claude Thornhill, and Sam Donahue, Dennis also performed with Charles Mingus, appearing on two of Mingus's albums in 1959, Blues & Roots and Mingus Ah Um. In 1953, Dennis recorded Four Trombones (released in 1957) for Mingus's Debut Records. The other three trombones were J. J. Johnson, Kai Winding and Bennie Green.

In 1951, Dennis began studying with Lennie Tristano. To make ends meet, he worked as an attendant at the Museum of Modern Art. The fullest recorded example of Dennis's solo work is on a little-known 1956 Savoy disc by English pianist Ronnie Ball (also a student of Tristano), All About Ronnie, in the company of Ted Brown and Kenny Clarke.

Dennis toured with Mingus in 1956. He published an essay, "The History of the Trombone," in Metronome. In the late 1950s Dennis returned to his big band roots, joining Buddy Rich in 1959 after stints with Benny Goodman (with whom he travelled to the Soviet Union in 1962) and Woody Herman. In the 1960s, Dennis often performed with Gerry Mulligan.

Dennis was known for his extremely fast articulation on the trombone, obtained by means of varying the natural harmonics of the instrument with minimal recourse to the slide (a technique known as "crossing the grain"), for instance, during his improvised solo on a performance of "Chuggin'" with the Gerry Mulligan Concert Band.

== Personal life ==
Dennis married singer Morgana King in 1961; the couple had no children. He died in 1965 in an automobile accident in Central Park, New York City.

== Discography ==
- Four Trombones (Debut, 1957) - with J. J. Johnson, Kai Winding and Bennie Green

With Cannonball Adderley

- Domination (Capitol, 1965)

With Manny Albam

- Jazz Goes to the Movies (Impulse!, 1962)

With Al Cohn

- Jazz Mission to Moscow (Colpix, 1962)

With Mundell Lowe

- Themes from Mr. Lucky, the Untouchables and Other TV Action Jazz (RCA Camden, 1960)

With Gary McFarland

- The Jazz Version of "How to Succeed in Business without Really Trying" (Verve, 1962)
- Point of Departure (Impulse!, 1963)

With Charles Mingus

- Jazz Workshop – Autobiography in Jazz (Debut, 1953)
- Blues & Roots (Atlantic, 1959)
- Mingus Ah Um (Columbia, 1959)
- The Complete Town Hall Concert (Blue Note, 1962 [1994])

With Gerry Mulligan

- Gerry Mulligan and the Concert Jazz Band on Tour (Verve, 1960 [1962])
- Gerry Mulligan and the Concert Jazz Band at the Village Vanguard (Verve, 1960 [1961])
- Gerry Mulligan Presents a Concert in Jazz (Verve, 1961)
- Gerry Mulligan '63 (Verve, 1963)

With Oliver Nelson

- Full Nelson (Verve, 1963)

With Anita O'Day

- All the Sad Young Men (Verve, 1962)

With Buddy Rich

- Richcraft (Mercury, 1959)
- Rich Versus Roach (Mercury, 1959)
- The Driver (EmArcy, 1960)

With Shirley Scott

- Great Scott!! (Impulse!, 1964)

With Zoot Sims

- Lost Tapes-Baden Baden 1958 (SWR, 2014)

With Lennie Tristano

- Chicago April 1951 (Uptown, 2014)

With Phil Woods

- Rights of Swing (Candid, 1961)
