= Gerry Mulligan Meets Johnny Hodges =

Studio album by Gerry Mulligan and Johnny Hodges
- Released: 1960
- Recorded: November 17, 1959; Los Angeles, CA
- Genre: Jazz
- Length: 33:11
- Label: Verve MGV 8367

Johnny Hodges chronology
Blues-a-Plenty (1958)	Gerry Mulligan Meets Johnny Hodges (1960)	Blue Hodge (1961)

Gerry Mulligan chronology
What Is There to Say? (1959)	Gerry Mulligan Meets Johnny Hodges (1959)	Gerry Mulligan Meets Ben Webster (1959)

Gerry Mulligan Meets Johnny Hodges is an album recorded by American jazz saxophonists Gerry Mulligan and Johnny Hodges featuring performances recorded in 1959 released on the Verve label.

== Reception ==
Professional ratings
Review scores
Source	Rating
Allmusic	4/5 stars

The Allmusic site awarded the album 4 stars stating "Gerry Mulligan's 1959 studio date with Johnny Hodges is one of the most satisfying sessions of his various meetings with different saxophonists for Verve... Throughout the date, the two saxophonists blend beautifully and complement one another's efforts, even though this was their only opportunity to record together in the studio".

== Track listing ==
All compositions by Johnny Hodges except as indicated

1. "Bunny" (Gerry Mulligan) - 5:40
2. "What's the Rush" (Mulligan*, Judy Holliday) - 3:40
3. "Back Beat" - 7:27
4. "What It's All About" - 3:59
5. "18 Carrots for Rabbit" (Mulligan) - 5:14
6. "Shady Side" - 7:04

== Personnel ==
- Gerry Mulligan - baritone saxophone - except track 2
- Johnny Hodges - alto saxophone
- Claude Williamson - piano
- Buddy Clark - bass
- Mel Lewis - drums

== Charts ==
Chart (2025)	Peak position
Croatian International Albums (HDU)	33
