= The Concert Jazz Band =

Studio album by Gerry Mulligan
- Released: 1960
- Recorded: May 21 and July 25 & 27, 1960; Plaza Sound, New York City
- Genre: Jazz
- Length: 39:40
- Label: Verve MGV 8388
- Producer: Val Valentin

Gerry Mulligan chronology
Gerry Mulligan Meets Ben Webster (1959)	The Concert Jazz Band (1960)	Gerry Mulligan and the Concert Jazz Band on Tour (1960)

Professional ratings
Review scores
Source	Rating
The Penguin Guide to Jazz Recordings	3/4 stars

The Concert Jazz Band is an album recorded by American jazz saxophonist Gerry Mulligan featuring performances recorded in 1960 which were released on the Verve label.

== Track listing ==
1. "Sweet and Slow" (Harry Warren, Al Dubin) - 5:17
2. "Bweebida Bobbida" (Gerry Mulligan) - 5:47
3. "Manoir de Mes Rêves (Django's Castle)" (Django Reinhardt) - 3:49
4. "You Took Advantage of Me" (Richard Rodgers, Lorenz Hart) - 4:39
5. "Out of This World" (Harold Arlen, Johnny Mercer) - 3:50
6. "My Funny Valentine" (Rodgers, Hart) - 5:03
7. "Broadway" (Billy Bird, Teddy McRae, Henri Wood) - 5:21
8. "I'm Gonna Go Fishin'" (Duke Ellington, Peggy Lee) - 5:54

== Personnel ==
- Gerry Mulligan - baritone saxophone
- Don Ferrara, Conte Candoli and Nick Travis (tracks 1–7), Danny Stiles and Phil Sunkel (track 8) - trumpet
- Wayne Andre - trombone
- Alan Raph - bass trombone
- Bob Brookmeyer - valve trombone
- Dick Meldonian - alto saxophone
- Gene Quill - alto saxophone, clarinet
- Zoot Sims, Jim Reider (track 8) - tenor saxophone
- Gene Allen - baritone saxophone, bass clarinet
- Buddy Clark (tracks 1–7), Bill Tackus (track 8) - bass
- Mel Lewis (tracks 1–7), Dave Bailey (track 8) - drums
