= Jazz Concerto Grosso =

Studio album by Gerry Mulligan and Bob Brookmeyer
- Released: 1958
- Recorded: October 14 & 15, 1957; New York City
- Genre: Jazz
- Length: 32:43
- Label: ABC-Paramount ABC-225
- Producer: Creed Taylor

Bob Brookmeyer chronology
Traditionalism Revisited (1957)	Jazz Concerto Grosso (1958)	The Street Swingers (1957)

Gerry Mulligan chronology
Gerry Mulligan Meets Stan Getz (1957)	Jazz Concerto Grosso (1957)	The Gerry Mulligan Songbook (1957)

Jazz Concerto Grosso (full title Gerry Mulligan Bob Brookmeyer Play Phil Sunkel's Jazz Concerto Grosso) is an album by American jazz musicians Gerry Mulligan and Bob Brookmeyer featuring performances of compositions by Phil Sunkel recorded in 1957 and released on the ABC-Paramount label. The album was released on CD combined with the 1956 album "Every morning I Listen to... Phil Sunkel's Jazz Band".

== Reception ==
Professional ratings
Review scores
Source	Rating
Allmusic	3/5 stars

The Allmusic review by Ken Dryden stated "Although Gerry Mulligan and Bob Brookmeyer get top billing on this LP, the leader, composer, and arranger of all three compositions is cornetist Phil Sunkel. ...All of the music is enjoyable and falls clearly into the cool jazz genre, but it has languished in obscurity like Sunkel, though he was later briefly a member of the acclaimed Gerry Mulligan Concert Jazz Band".

== Track listing ==
All compositions by Phil Sunkel

1. "Jazz Concerto Grosso" - 15:40
2. "Something for the Ladies" - 9:10
3. "Song for Cornet" - 7:53

== Personnel ==
- Gerry Mulligan - baritone saxophone
- Bob Brookmeyer - valve trombone
- Phil Sunkel - cornet
- John Wilson - trumpet, flugelhorn
- Nick Travis, Al Stewart, Don Stratton - trumpet (track 1)
- Frank Rehak - trombone (track 1)
- Eddie Bert - bass trombone (track 1)
- Don Butterfield - tuba (track 1)
- Dick Meldonian - alto saxophone (track 1)
- Cliff Hoff (track 1), Bill Slapin (track 1), Jim Reider (tracks 2 & 3) - tenor saxophone
- Gene Allen - baritone saxophone (track 1)
- Milt Hinton (track 1), Wendell Marshall (tracks 2 & 3) - bass
- Harold Granowsky (track 1), Osie Johnson (tracks 2 & 3) - drums
