= Night Lights (Gerry Mulligan album) =

1963 studio album by Gerry Mulligan

Studio album by Gerry "Jeru" Mulligan
- Released: 1963
- Recorded: September 12 and October 3, 1963
- Studio: Nola Penthouse Studios, New York City
- Genre: Cool jazz
- Length: 31:31
- Label: Philips PMH 600-108
- Producer: Hal Mooney

Gerry Mulligan chronology
Gerry Mulligan '63 (1963)	Night Lights (1963)	Butterfly with Hiccups (1963)

Night Lights is an album by American jazz saxophonist Gerry Mulligan featuring performances recorded in 1963 and first released on the Philips label. The album's re-release on the Verve Label, includes the bonus track "The Lonely Night (Night Lights 1965 Version)" which originally only appeared on Mulligan's 1965 album "Feelin' Good" with vocals by his partner, Judy Holliday.

The album was re-released on vinyl by New Land in 2022.

== Reception ==
Professional ratings
Review scores
Source	Rating
Allmusic	3/5 stars
The Penguin Guide to Jazz Recordings	3/4 stars

Writing in the Oakland Tribune, Russ Wilson described the album as "Done with a lights-out, after-hours feel[;] it is high caliber jazz that is played with a marvelously pervasive pulse."

AllMusic awarded the album three stars stating, "This is a rather relaxed recording featuring baritonist Gerry Mulligan and some of his top alumni... The emphasis is on ballads and nothing too innovative occurs, but the results are pleasing and laid-back".

== Track listing ==
All compositions by Gerry Mulligan except as indicated

1. "Night Lights" – 4:53
2. "Morning of the Carnival" (Luiz Bonfá, Antônio Maria) – 5:27
3. "In the Wee Small Hours of the Morning" (David Mann, Bob Hilliard) – 5:34
4. "Prelude in E Minor" (Frédéric Chopin) – 4:11
5. "Festival Minor" – 6:45
6. "Tell Me When" – 4:06
7. "The Lonely Night (Night Lights 1965 Instrumental Version)" – 2:54 – Bonus track on Verve label re-release

== Personnel ==
- Gerry Mulligan – baritone saxophone, piano on track 1 only
- Art Farmer – flugelhorn
- Bob Brookmeyer – valve trombone
- Jim Hall – guitar
- Bill Crow – bass
- Dave Bailey – drums

== Charts ==
Chart performance for Night Lights
Chart (2024)	Peak position
Croatian International Albums (HDU)	18

Chart (2026)	Peak position
Greek Albums (IFPI)	48
