= Holliday with Mulligan =

Studio album by Judy Holliday and Gerry Mulligan
- Released: 1980
- Recorded: April 10, 11, 12, 14 & 17, 1961; Olmsted Studios, New York
- Genre: Jazz
- Length: 32:52
- Label: DRG SL 5191

Gerry Mulligan chronology
Gerry Mulligan and the Concert Jazz Band at the Village Vanguard (1960)	Holliday with Mulligan (1980)	Gerry Mulligan Presents a Concert in Jazz (1961)

Holliday with Mulligan is an album by American singer Judy Holliday with jazz saxophonist and bandleader Gerry Mulligan featuring performances recorded in 1961 which were first released on the DRG label in 1980.

== Reception ==
Professional ratings
Review scores
Source	Rating
Allmusic	3/5 stars

Scott Yanow, writing for AllMusic, stated: "Baritone-saxophonist Gerry Mulligan and actress Judy Holliday were an 'item' around the time of this recording. Their one meeting on record features Holliday doing some effective singing on eleven songs, mostly lesser-known standards plus four songs co-written by the two leaders. Unfortunately Mulligan's Concert Jazz Band is largely wasted, being restricted to anonymous accompaniment of Holliday, making this CD of greater historical value than of interest to jazz listeners".

== Track listing ==
1. "What's the Rush" (Mulligan, Holliday) – 3:26
2. "Loving You" (Mulligan, Holliday) – 2:13
3. "Lazy" (Irving Berlin) – 2:27
4. "It Must Be Christmas" (Mulligan, Holliday) – 3:02
5. "The Party's Over" (Jule Styne, Adolph Green, Betty Comden) – 2:26
6. "It's Bad For Me" (Cole Porter) – 2:09
7. "Supper Time" (Berlin) – 4:14
8. "Pass That Peace Pipe" (Roger Edens, Hugh Martin, Ralph Blane) – 2:59
9. "I Gotta Right to Sing the Blues" (Harold Arlen, Ted Koehler) – 2:52
10. "Summer's Over" (Mulligan, Holliday) – 3:47
11. "Blue Prelude" (Gordon Jenkins, Joe Bishop) – 3:17

== Personnel ==
- Judy Holliday – vocals
- Gerry Mulligan – baritone saxophone
- Alex De Risi, Don Ferrara, Nick Travis – trumpet
- Bob Brookmeyer – valve trombone, arranger
- Alan Raph – bass trombone
- Earl Chapin, Fred Klein, Gunther Schuller – French horn
- Walter Levinsky – alto saxophone, clarinet
- Al Klink – tenor saxophone, flute
- Donald Ashworth – saxophone, oboe
- Gene Allen – baritone saxophone, bass clarinet
- Bernie Leighton – piano
- Bill Crow – bass
- Mel Lewis – drums
- Ralph Burns, Al Cohn, Bill Finegan – arranger
