= Historically Speaking (Gerry Mulligan album) =

Studio album by Gerry Mulligan
- Released: 1951
- Recorded: August 27, 1951
- Genre: Cool jazz
- Label: Prestige

Professional ratings
Review scores
Source	Rating
AllMusic	3/5 stars

Historically Speaking is a reissue of an August 27, 1951 recording by baritone saxophonist Gerry Mulligan that was released as Prestige 7251.

The album was originally reissued on 12-inch LP as Mulligan Plays Mulligan on Prestige 7006 after originally being released as a 10- inch LP in 1951

== Track listing ==
1. "Funhouse" (3:12)
2. "Ide's Side" (3:19)
3. "Roundhouse" (3:32)
4. "Kaper" (3:09)
5. "Bweebida Bobbida" (2:59)
6. "Mullenium" (4:06)
7. "Mulligan's Too" (17:36)

== Personnel ==
- Gerry Mulligan – baritone saxophone
- Max McElroy – baritone saxophone (track 1–6)
- Allen Eager – tenor saxophone
- George Wallington – piano
- Jerry Hurwitz and Nick Travis – trumpet (track 1–6)
- Ollie Wilson – trombone (track 1–6)
- Phil Leshin – double-bass
- Walter Bolden – drums
- Gail Madden – maracas
