= Gerry Mulligan '63 =

Studio album by Gerry Mulligan
- Released: 1963
- Recorded: December 18, 19 & 21, 1962; Webster Hall, NYC
- Genre: Jazz
- Label: Verve V/V6 8515
- Producer: Jim Davis

Gerry Mulligan chronology
Spring Is Sprung (1962)	Gerry Mulligan '63 (1963)	Night Lights (1963)

Gerry Mulligan '63 (subtitled The Concert Jazz Band) is an album recorded by American jazz saxophonist and bandleader Gerry Mulligan featuring performances recorded in late 1962 which were released on the Verve label.

== Reception ==
Professional ratings
Review scores
Source	Rating
Allmusic	3/5 stars

The Allmusic review states "this is a high-quality if rather brief program. Trumpeter Clark Terry and guitarist Jim Hall co-star with Mulligan in the solo department. It is a pity that this orchestra could not prosper; all five of its recordings are worth getting".

== Track listing ==
1. "Little Rock Getaway" (Carl Sigman, Joe Sullivan) - 3:01
2. "Ballad" (Gerry Mulligan) - 4:11
3. "Big City Life" (Bob Brookmeyer) - 5:19
4. "Big City Blues" (Brookmeyer) - 5:39
5. "My Kinda Love" (Louis Alter, Jo Trent) - 3:55
6. "Pretty Little Gypsy" (Gary McFarland) - 3:35
7. "Bridgehampton South" (McFarland) - 5:09
8. "Bridgehampton Strut" (McFarland) - 3:55

== Personnel ==
- Gerry Mulligan - baritone saxophone, clarinet, track 4 and 6 arranger
- Don Ferrara, Doc Severinsen, Nick Travis - trumpet
- Clark Terry - trumpet, flugelhorn
- Willie Dennis - trombone
- Tony Studd - bass trombone
- Bob Brookmeyer - valve trombone, piano, tracks 3 and 4 arranger
- Eddie Caine - alto saxophone, alto flute
- Gene Quill - alto saxophone, clarinet
- Jim Reider - tenor saxophone
- Gene Allen - baritone saxophone, bass clarinet
- Jim Hall - guitar
- Bill Crow - bass
- Gus Johnson - drums
- Gary McFarland - arranger
