= Paris Concert =

Paris Concert may refer to:

- Paris Concert (Gerry Mulligan album) recorded 1954 and released 1955
- Paris Concert (Circle album), 1971
- Paris Concert (Keith Jarrett album) recorded 1988 and released 1990
