= Jeru (album) =

Studio album by Gerry Mulligan
- Released: 1962
- Recorded: June 30, 1962; Nola Penthouse Studio, NYC
- Genre: Jazz
- Length: 36:23
- Label: Columbia CL-1932/CS-8732
- Producer: Jazztime Productions Inc.

Gerry Mulligan chronology
The Gerry Mulligan Quartet (1962)	Jeru (1962)	Two of a Mind (1962)

Jeru is an album recorded by American jazz saxophonist and bandleader Gerry Mulligan featuring performances recorded in 1962 which were released on the Columbia label.

== Reception ==
Professional ratings
Review scores
Source	Rating
Allmusic	3/5 stars
Encyclopedia of Popular Music	4/5 stars
The Penguin Guide to Jazz Recordings	3/4 stars

Allmusic awarded the album 3 stars stating "Mulligan is in fine form and, even if the music on this LP is not all that essential, it is quite enjoyable".

== Track listing ==
1. "Capricious" (Billy Taylor) - 5:47
2. "Here I'll Stay" (Kurt Weill, Alan Jay Lerner) - 5:00
3. "Inside Impromptu" (Taylor) - 5:32
4. "You've Come Home" (Cy Coleman, Carolyn Leigh) - 5:40
5. "Get Out of Town" (Cole Porter) - 4:12
6. "Blue Boy" (Gerry Mulligan) - 4:38
7. "Lonely Town" (Leonard Bernstein, Betty Comden, Adolph Green) - 5:34

== Personnel ==
- Gerry Mulligan - baritone saxophone
- Tommy Flanagan - piano
- Ben Tucker - bass
- Dave Bailey - drums
- Alec Dorsey - congas
