= Butterfly with Hiccups =

Studio album by Gerry Mulligan
- Released: 1964
- Recorded: September 3 and October 3 & 11, 1963 and June 25, 1964
- Studio: Nola Penthouse Studios, New York City
- Genre: Jazz
- Length: 35:10
- Label: Limelight LS 86004
- Producer: Hal Mooney

Gerry Mulligan chronology
Night Lights (1963)	Butterfly with Hiccups (1964)	If You Can't Beat 'Em, Join 'Em! (1965)

Butterfly with Hiccups (also released as Line for Lyons) is an album by American jazz saxophonist Gerry Mulligan featuring performances recorded in 1963 and 1964 and first released on the Limelight label.

== Reception ==
Professional ratings
Review scores
Source	Rating
Allmusic	3/5 stars

The Allmusic site awarded the album 3 stars.

For the Associated Press, Mary Campbell wrote, "It's spring, anytime, all the time, when you listen to Gerry Mulligan's newest jazz album." Noting that most of the tracks were composed by Mulligan, she said of the Lane and Harburg authored "Old Devil Moon" that "He makes [it] his own when he plays it." She noted his achievement as a band leader and added that "his group is right in there with him."

== Track listing ==
All compositions by Gerry Mulligan except as indicated

1. "Butterfly with Hiccups" - 3:16
2. "You'd Be So Nice to Come Home To" (Cole Porter) - 5:03
3. "Theme for Jobim" - 3:43
4. "Old Devil Moon" (Burton Lane, Yip Harburg) - 4:35
5. "The Ant Hill" - 7:24
6. "Blues for Lynda" - 3:39
7. "Line for Lyons" - 3:15
8. "Crazy Day" - 4:15

== Personnel ==
- Gerry Mulligan - baritone saxophone, piano
- Art Farmer - flugelhorn (tracks 1, 4, 5 & 8)
- Bob Brookmeyer - valve trombone
- Jim Hall - guitar (tracks 1, 4, 5 & 8)
- Bill Crow - bass
- Dave Bailey - drums
