= Feelin' Good (Gerry Mulligan album) =

Studio album by Gerry Mulligan
- Released: 1965
- Recorded: October 20, 21 & 22, 1965
- Studio: Annex Recording Studios, Hollywood, CA
- Genre: Jazz
- Length: 33:24
- Label: Limelight LS 86030
- Producer: Jack Tracy

Gerry Mulligan chronology
If You Can't Beat 'Em, Join 'Em! (1965)	Feelin' Good (1965)	Something Borrowed - Something Blue (1966)

Feelin' Good (also released as Love Walked In) is an album by American jazz saxophonist Gerry Mulligan featuring performances recorded in 1965 and first released on the Limelight label.

== Reception ==
Professional ratings
Review scores
Source	Rating
AllMusic	3/5 stars

AllMusic awarded the album 3 stars with its review by Ken Dryen stating "Although the presence of a ten-piece string section conducted and arranged by Julian Lee might make some jazz fans assume this Gerry Mulligan date borders on easy listening, that's hardly the case. The strings are used judiciously for color instead of overwhelming the music... the focus is on the leader's warm, melodic solos. While this long unavailable LP obviously can't be considered among the top tier of his recordings, Mulligan fans will not be disappointed if they can locate copies".

== Track listing ==
1. "The Lonely Night (Night Lights)" (Gerry Mulligan, Judy Holliday) - 2:48
2. "Please Don't Talk About Me When I'm Gone" (Sam H. Stept, Sidney Clare) - 3:02
3. "The Second Time Around" (Jimmy Van Heusen, Sammy Cahn) - 2:22
4. "Not Mine" (Victor Schertzinger, Johnny Mercer) - 3:06
5. "P.S. I Love You" (Gordon Jenkins, Mercer) - 2:54
6. "The Song Is Ended" (Irving Berlin) - 2:47
7. "Love Walked In" (George Gershwin, Ira Gershwin) - 2:24\
8. "Feeling Good" (Anthony Newley, Leslie Bricusse) - 3:37
9. "Love Is the Sweetest Thing" (Ray Noble) - 3:35
10. "I'll Walk Alone" (Jule Styne, Sammy Cahn) - 3:32
11. "The Shadow of Your Smile" (Johnny Mandel, Paul Francis Webster) - 3:17

== Personnel ==
- Gerry Mulligan - baritone saxophone (tracks 2, 3, 5, 6 & 8–11), clarinet (tracks 1, 4 & 7)
- Jimmy Helms (tracks 2, 3, 5, 6 & 8–11), Johnny Gray (tracks 1, 4 & 7) - guitar
- Jimmy Bond - bass
- Hal Blaine - drums
- Harry Bluestone - violin, concertmaster
- Unidentified string section arranged and conducted by Julian Lee
