= Gene Quill =

American jazz saxophonist (1927–1988)

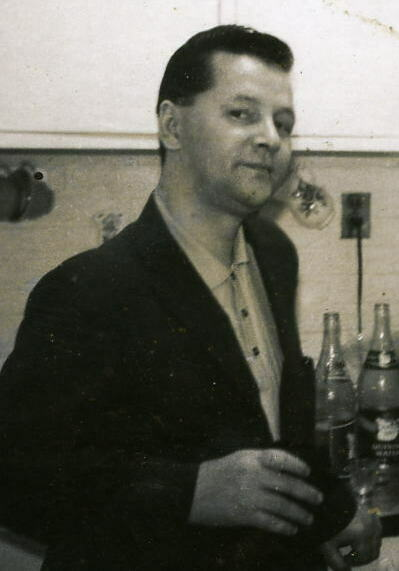
- Quill in 1963

Background information
- Birth name: Daniel Eugene Quill
- Born: December 15, 1927; Atlantic City, New Jersey, U.S.
- Died: December 8, 1988 (aged 60); Atlantic City, New Jersey, U.S.
- Genres: Jazz
- Occupation: Saxophonist
- Labels: Roost, Dawn, Prestige, RCA

Daniel Eugene Quill (December 15, 1927 – December 8, 1988) was an American jazz alto saxophonist who played often with Phil Woods in the duet Phil and Quill. Quill also worked as a sideman for Buddy DeFranco, Quincy Jones, Gene Krupa, Gerry Mulligan, and Claude Thornhill. He played on the last recording of Billie Holiday in 1959. In 1988, Quill died at the age of 60 in his hometown of Atlantic City, New Jersey.

== Discography ==
=== As leader ===
- Gene Quill 'The Tiger': Portrait of a Great Alto Player (Fresh Sound, 1955)
- 3 Bones and a Quill (Vogue, 1959)
- Jazzville Vol. 1 (Dawn, 1956)

With Phil Woods

- Pairing Off (Prestige, 1956)
- Phil and Quill (RCA Victor, 1957)
- Phil and Quill with Prestige (Prestige, 1957)
- Phil Talks with Quill (Epic, 1959)
- Bird Feathers (Prestige, 1957)
- Four Altos with Sahib Shihab and Hal Stein (Prestige, 1958)

=== As sideman ===
With Manny Albam

- Play Music from West Side Story (Coral, 1957)
- Steve's Songs (Dot, 1958)
- Jazz Horizons: Jazz New York (Coral, 1958)
- The Blues Is Everybody's Business (Coral, 1958)
- Jazz Goes to the Movies (Impulse!, 1962)

With Bob Brookmeyer

- Brookmeyer (Vik, 1957)
- Portrait of the Artist (Atlantic, 1960)
- Gloomy Sunday and Other Bright Moments (Verve, 1961)

With Al Cohn

- East Coast – West Coast Scene (RCA Victor, 1955)
- Mr. Music (RCA Victor, 1955)
- The Sax Section (Epic, 1956)
- Son of Drum Suite (RCA Victor, 1961)

With Michel Legrand

- Legrand Jazz (Philips, 1958)
- Michel Legrand Meets Miles Davis (Philips, 1970)

With Gerry Mulligan

- The Concert Jazz Band (Verve, 1960)
- Gerry Mulligan and the Concert Jazz Band at the Village Vanguard (Verve, 1961)
- Gerry Mulligan Presents a Concert in Jazz (Verve, 1961)
- Gerry Mulligan and the Concert Jazz Band on Tour (Verve, 1962)
- Gerry Mulligan '63 (Verve, 1963)

With Joe Newman

- I'm Still Swinging (RCA Victor, 1955)
- I Feel Like a Newman (Storyville, 1956)
- New Sounds in Swing with Billy Byers (Jazztone, 1956)
- East Coast Sounds (Jazztone, 1957)

With Johnny Richards

- Wide Range (Capitol, 1957)
- Experiments in Sound (Capitol, 1958)
- Walk Softly/Run Wild (Coral, 1959)

With others

- Steve Allen, Steve Allen Plays Neal Hefti (Coral, 1958)
- Buddy Arnold, Wailing (ABC-Paramount, 1956)
- Gil Evans, Into the Hot (Impulse!, 1962)
- Dick Garcia, A Message from Garcia (Dawn, 1956)
- Billie Holiday, Billie Holiday (MGM, 1959)
- Quincy Jones, This Is How I Feel About Jazz (ABC Paramount, 1957)
- Teddi King, Now in Vogue (Vogue, 1955)
- Jimmy Knepper, A Swinging Introduction to Jimmy Knepper (Bethlehem, 1957)
- Mundell Lowe, A Grand Night for Swinging (Riverside, 1957)
- Oscar Pettiford, Winner's Circle (Bethlehem, 1957)
- Pony Poindexter, Pony's Express (Epic, 1962)
- Bill Potts, The Jazz Soul of Porgy & Bess (United Artists, 1959)
- Buddy Rich, Swingin' New Big Band (Pacific Jazz, 1966)
- Jimmy Rushing, Five Feet of Soul (Colpix, 1963)
- Hal Schaefer, UA Showcase: Great Songs from United Artists Pictures (London, 1958)
- Claude Thornhill, Claude Thornhill and His Orchestra Play the Great Jazz Arrangements of Gerry Mulligan and Ralph Aldrich (Trend, 1953)
- George Williams, Put on Your Dancing Shoes (United Artists, 1960)
