= Jon Eardley =

American jazz trumpeter

- Born: 30 September 1928; Altoona, Pennsylvania, United States
- Died: 1 April 1991 (aged 62) Lambermont, Verviers, Belgium
- Genres: Jazz
- Occupation: Musician
- Instruments: Trumpet, flugelhorn
- Labels: Prestige, Spotlite

Jon Eardley (30 September 1928 – 1 April 1991) was an American jazz trumpeter and flugelhornist.

== Life and career ==
Born in Altoona, Pennsylvania, Eardley first started on trumpet at the age of 11; his father played in Paul Whiteman's orchestra. From 1946 to 1949 Eardley played in an Air Force band in Washington, D.C., then led with his own quartet in D.C. from 1950 to 1953.

He moved to New York City in 1953, playing with Phil Woods (1954), Gerry Mulligan (1954–57), and Hal McIntyre (1956). Following this he returned to his hometown and played there until 1963, when he moved to Belgium. In 1969 he moved to Cologne, Germany, playing there with Harald Banter and Chet Baker and working through the 1980s. The last years before death he played in the WDR Big Band Cologne, Germany. He died in Lambermont, near Verviers, Belgium.

== Discography ==
=== As leader ===
Year recorded	Title	Label	Year released	Personnel/Notes
1954	Jon Eardley in Hollywood	New Jazz	1955	Quartet, with Eardley (trumpet), Pete Jolly (piano), Red Mitchell (bass), Larry Bunker (drums); 10" LP, reissued together with Hey There, Jon Eardley! as From Hollywood to New York (Prestige, 1990)
1955	Hey There, Jon Eardley!	Prestige	1955	Quintet, with Eardley (trumpet), J. R. Monterose (tenor sax), George Syran (piano), Teddy Kotick (bass), Nick Stabulas (drums); 10" LP, reissued together with Jon Eardley in Hollywood as From Hollywood to New York (Prestige, 1990)
1956	The Jon Eardley Seven	Prestige	1956	Septet, with Eardley (trumpet), Milt Gold (trombone), Phil Woods (alto sax), Zoot Sims (tenor sax), George Syran (piano), Teddy Kotick (bass), Nick Stabulas (drums)
1977	Namely Me	Spotlite	1979	Quintet, with Eardley (trumpet, flugelhorn), Peter King (alto sax), John Taylor (piano), Ron Mathewson (bass), Mickey Roker (drums)
1977	Stablemates – with Al Haig	Spotlite	1979	Quintet, with Eardley (trumpet, flugelhorn), Art Themen (tenor sax), Al Haig (piano), Daryl Runswick (bass), Allan Ganley (drums)
1977	Two of a Kind – with Mick Pyne	Spotlite	1977	Duo, with Eardley (flugelhorn), Mick Pyne (piano)

=== As sideman ===
With Gerry Mulligan

- California Concerts (Pacific Jazz, 1955)
- Presenting the Gerry Mulligan Sextet (EmArcy, 1955)
- Mainstream of Jazz (EmArcy, 1956)
- A Profile of Gerry Mulligan (Mercury, 1959)

With others

- Teo Macero, What's New? (Columbia, 1956)
- J. R. Monterose, Body and Soul (Munich, 1970)
- Airto Moreira, Misa Espiritual: Airto's Brazilian Mass (Harmonia Mundi, 1983)
- Charlie Parker, Apartment Jam Sessions (Zim, 1977)
- Manfred Schoof, Reflections (Mood, 1984)
- Zoot Sims, Choice (Pacific Jazz, 1961)
