= Gerry Mulligan =

American jazz saxophonist and clarinetist (1927–1996)

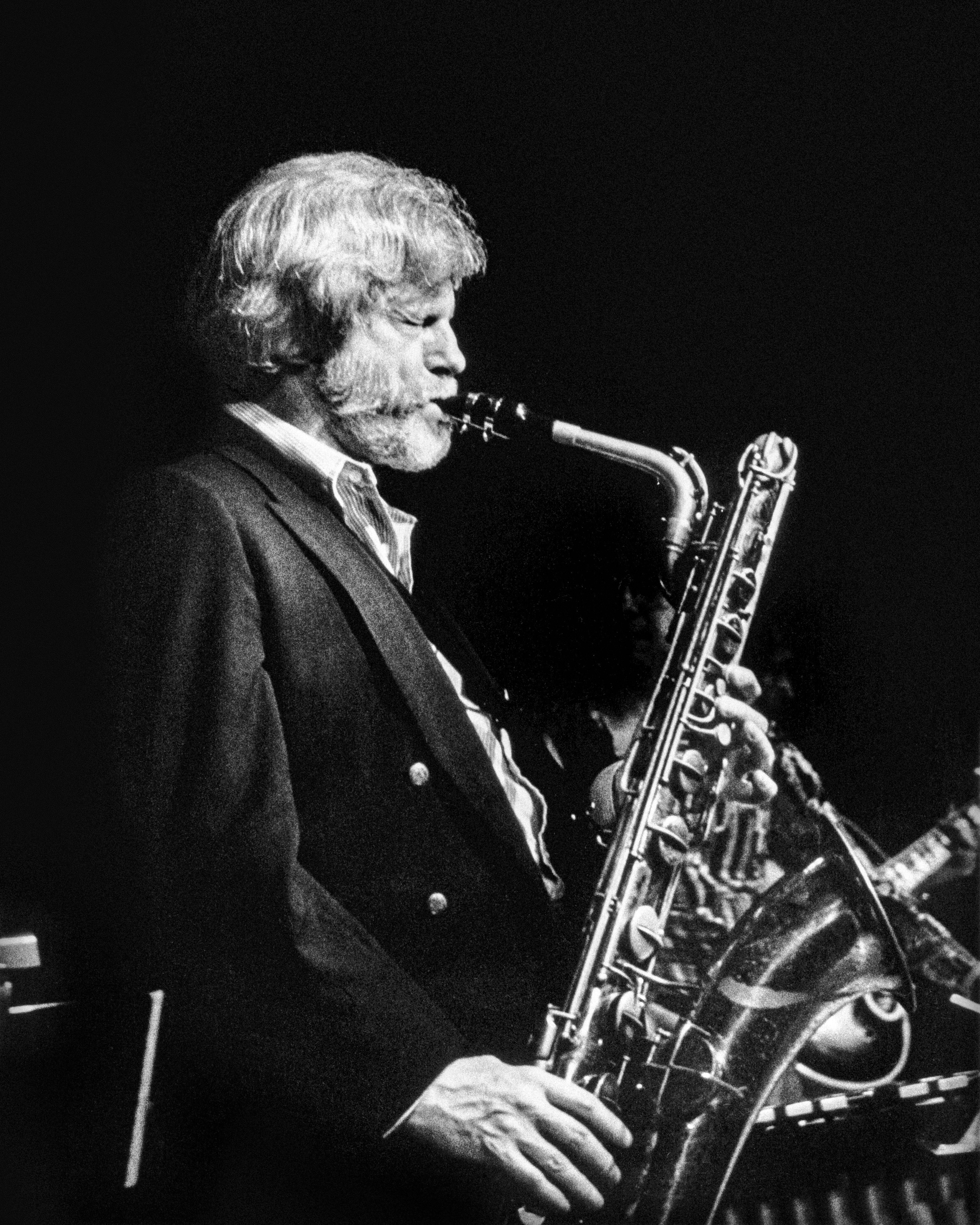
- Mulligan, c. 1980s, by William P. Gottlieb

Background information
- Born: Gerald Joseph Mulligan; April 6, 1927; Queens, New York, U.S.
- Died: January 20, 1996 (aged 68) Darien, Connecticut, U.S.
- Genres: Jazz; cool jazz; third stream
- Occupations: Musician; composer; arranger
- Instruments: Baritone saxophone; piano
- Years active: 1946–1996
- Formerly of: the Claude Thornhill Orchestra; Miles Davis; Kai Winding; The pianoless quartet with Chet Baker; Gerry Mulligan / Dave Brubeck Quartet; The Concert Jazz Band
- Spouses: Jeffie Boyd (m. 1953; ann. 1953) Arlyne Brown (m. 1953; div. 1959) Franca Rota (m. 1982)
- Partners: Judy Holliday (1958–1965; her death); Sandy Dennis (1965–1974)

Gerald Joseph Mulligan (April 6, 1927 – January 20, 1996), also known as Jeru, was an American jazz saxophonist, clarinetist, pianist, composer and arranger. Though primarily known as one of the leading jazz baritone saxophonists—playing the instrument with a light and airy tone in the era of cool jazz—Mulligan was also a significant arranger working with Claude Thornhill, Miles Davis, Stan Kenton, and others. His piano-less quartet of the early 1950s with trumpeter Chet Baker is still regarded as one of the best cool jazz ensembles. Mulligan was also a skilled pianist and played several other reed instruments. Several of his compositions, including "Walkin' Shoes" and "Five Brothers", have become standards.

== Biography ==
=== Early life and career ===
Gerry Mulligan was born in Queens Village, Queens, New York, the son of George and Louise Mulligan. His father was a Wilmington, Delaware, native of Irish descent; his mother a Philadelphia native of half-Irish and half-German descent. Gerry was the youngest of four sons with George, Phil and Don preceding him.

George Mulligan's career as an engineer necessitated frequent moves through numerous cities. When Gerry was less than a year old, the family moved to Marion, Ohio, where his father accepted a job with the Marion Power Shovel Company.

With the demands of a large home and four young boys to raise, Mulligan's mother hired an African American nanny named Lily Rose, who became especially fond of the youngest Mulligan. As he became older, Mulligan began spending time at Rose's house and was especially amused by Rose's player piano, which Mulligan later recalled as having rolls by numerous players, including Fats Waller. Black musicians sometimes came through town, and because many motels would not take them, they often had to stay at homes within the black community. The young Mulligan occasionally met such musicians staying at Rose's home.

The family's moves continued with stops in South Jersey (where Mulligan lived with his maternal grandmother), Chicago, and Kalamazoo, Michigan, where Mulligan lived for three years and attended Catholic school. When the school moved into a new building and established music courses, Mulligan decided to play clarinet in the school's nascent orchestra. Mulligan made an attempt at arranging with the Richard Rodgers song "Lover", but the arrangement was seized prior to its first reading by an overzealous nun who was taken aback by the title on the arrangement.

When Gerry Mulligan was 14, his family moved to Detroit and then to Reading, Pennsylvania. While in Reading, Mulligan began studying clarinet with dance-band musician Sammy Correnti, who also encouraged Mulligan's interest in arranging. Mulligan also began playing saxophone professionally in dance bands in Philadelphia, an hour and a half or so away.

The Mulligan family next moved to Philadelphia, where Gerry attended the West Philadelphia Catholic High School for Boys and organized a school big band, for which he also wrote arrangements. When Mulligan was sixteen, he approached Johnny Warrington at local radio station WCAU about writing arrangements for the station's house band. Warrington was impressed and began buying Mulligan's arrangements.

Mulligan dropped out of high school during his senior year to pursue work with a touring band. He contacted bandleader Tommy Tucker when Tucker was visiting Philadelphia's Earle Theatre. While Tucker did not need an additional reedman, he was looking for an arranger and Mulligan was hired at $100 a week to do two or three arrangements a week (including all copying). At the conclusion of Mulligan's three-month contract, Tucker told Mulligan that he should move on to another band which was a little less "tame". Mulligan went back to Philadelphia and began writing for Elliot Lawrence, a pianist and composer who had taken over for Warrington as the band leader at WCAU.

Mulligan moved to New York City in January 1946 and joined the arranging staff on Gene Krupa's bebop-tinged band. Arrangements of Mulligan's work with Krupa include "Birdhouse", "Disc Jockey Jump" and an arrangement of "How High the Moon", quoting Charlie Parker's "Ornithology" as a countermelody.

Mulligan next began arranging for the Claude Thornhill Orchestra, occasionally sitting in as a member of the reed section. Thornhill's arranging staff included Gil Evans, whom Mulligan had met while working with the Krupa band. Mulligan eventually began living with Evans; this was at the time that Evans' apartment on West 55th Street became a regular hangout for a number of jazz musicians, working on creating a new jazz idiom.

=== Birth of the Cool ===
In September 1948, Miles Davis formed a nine-piece band that used arrangements by Mulligan, Evans and John Lewis. The band initially consisted of Davis on trumpet, Mulligan on baritone saxophone, trombonist Mike Zwerin, alto saxophonist Lee Konitz, Junior Collins on French horn, tubist Bill Barber, pianist John Lewis, bassist Al McKibbon, and drummer Max Roach.

The band only played a handful of live performances (a two-week engagement at the Royal Roost and two nights at the Clique Club). However over the next couple of years, Davis reformed the nonet on three occasions to record twelve pieces for release as singles by Capitol Records. They formed the Birth of the Cool 12-inch album released in 1957. Mulligan wrote and arranged three of the tunes recorded ("Rocker", "Venus de Milo", and "Jeru", the last named after himself), and arranged a further three ("Deception", "Godchild", and "Darn That Dream").

Mulligan was one of only four musicians who played on all the recordings, with Davis, Konitz and Barber. Despite the chilly reception by audiences of 1949, the Davis nine-piece was later reappraised as one of the most influential groups in jazz history, creating a sound that, despite its East Coast origins, became known as West Coast Jazz.

During his period of occasional work with the Davis nonet between 1949 and 1951, Mulligan also regularly performed with and arranged for trombonist Kai Winding. Mulligan's composition "Elevation" and his arrangement of "Between the Devil and the Deep Blue Sea" were recorded by Mulligan's old boss, Elliot Lawrence. It brought Mulligan additional recognition. Mulligan also arranged for and recorded with bands led by Georgie Auld and Chubby Jackson.

In September 1951, Mulligan recorded the first album under his own name, Mulligan Plays Mulligan. By that point, he had mastered a melodic and linear playing style, inspired by Lester Young, that he would retain for the rest of his career.

In early 1952, seeking better employment opportunities, Mulligan headed west to Los Angeles with his girlfriend, pianist Gail Madden. Through an acquaintance with arranger Bob Graettinger, Mulligan started writing arrangements for Stan Kenton's Orchestra. While most of Mulligan's work for Kenton were somewhat pedestrian arrangements, that Kenton needed to fill out money-making dance performances, Mulligan was able to throw in some more substantial original works along the way. His compositions "Walking Shoes" and "Young Blood", stand out as embodiments of the contrapuntal style that became Mulligan's signature.

=== The pianoless quartet with Chet Baker ===
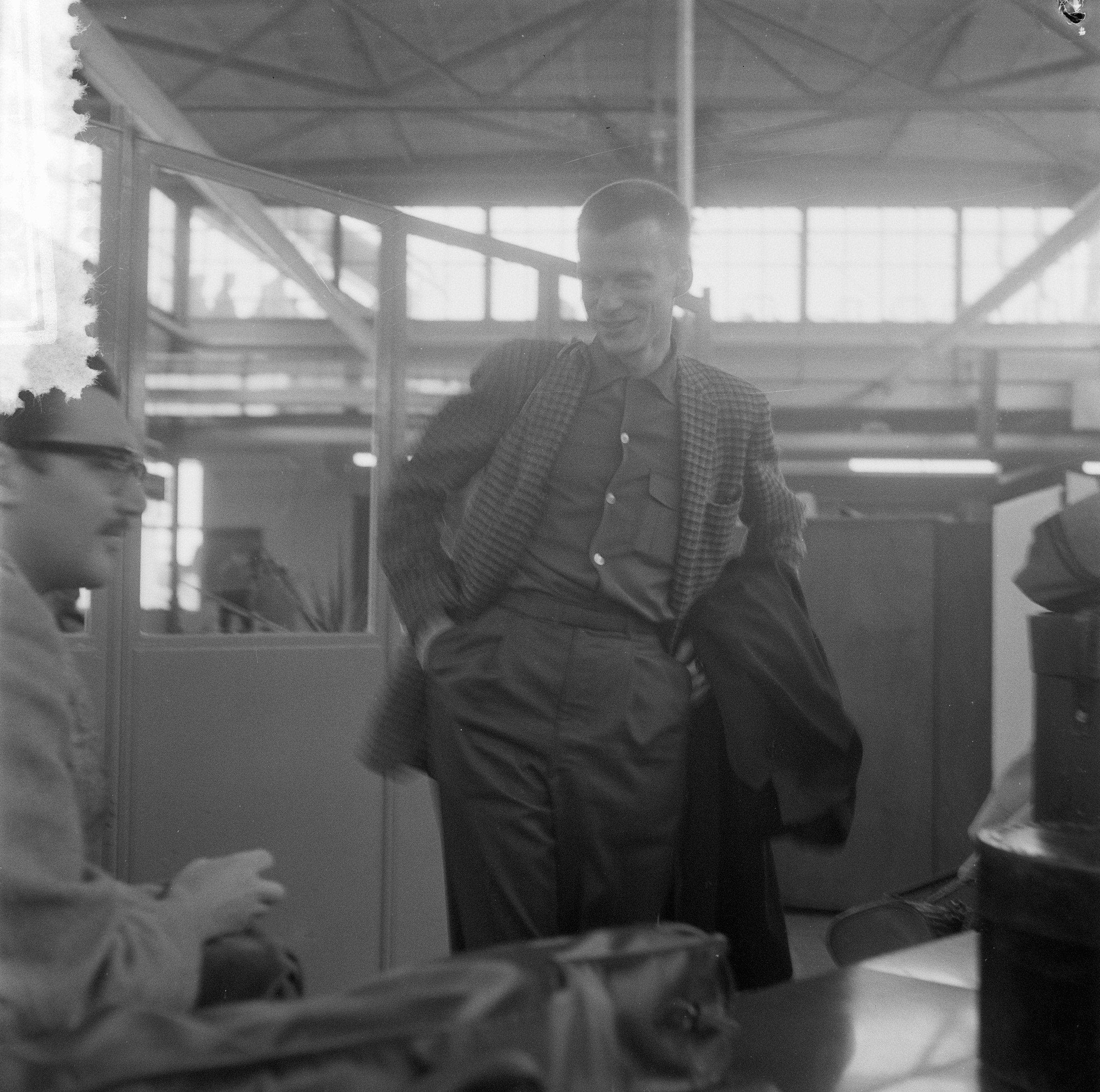
Mulligan at Schiphol, Amerstam, 1957

While arranging for Kenton, Mulligan began performing on off-nights at The Haig, a small jazz club on Wilshire Boulevard at Kenmore Street in Hollywood, Los Angeles. During the Monday night jam sessions, a young trumpeter named Chet Baker began sitting in with Mulligan. Mulligan and Baker began recording together, although they were unsatisfied with the results. Around that time, vibraphonist Red Norvo's trio (with guitar and bass) began headlining at The Haig, thus leaving no need to keep the grand piano that had been brought in for Erroll Garner's stay at the club.

Faced with a dilemma of what to do for a rhythm section, Mulligan decided to build on earlier experiments and perform as a pianoless quartet with Baker on trumpet, Carson Smith on bass, and Chico Hamilton on drums (later Mulligan himself would occasionally double on piano). These early live dates were recorded by Richard Bock on a portable reel-to-reel tape deck. Bock along with Roy Harte would soon after, start the Pacific Jazz label and release Mulligan's records. Mulligan's first recording sessions in Los Angeles were produced by Bock for Pacific Jazz. These three informal sessions took place in June, July, and August 1952 at the Hollywood Hills home studio of recording engineer Phil Turetsky. At these sessions, Mulligan, Chet Baker, and others recorded the material that was released as Pacific Jazz PJ LP-1 and later on PJ-8.

Baker's melodic style fit well with Mulligan, leading them to create improvised contrapuntal textures free from the rigid confines of a piano-enforced chordal structure. While novel at the time in sound and style, this ethos of contrapuntal group improvisation hearkened back to the formative days of jazz. Despite their very different backgrounds (Mulligan was a classically trained New Yorker, while Oklahoman Baker was mostly self-taught and a much more instinctive player) they had an almost psychic rapport and ability to improvise sophisticated melodic and harmonic patterns together. Mulligan later remarked: "I had never experienced anything like that before and not really since." Their dates at the Haig became sell-outs and the recordings they made in late 1952 became major sellers, that led to significant acclaim for Mulligan and Baker. The recordings included singles such as "Motel" (1953) labelled as 'The Gerry Mulligan Quartet Featuring Chet Baker'.

The fortuitous collaboration came to an abrupt end with Mulligan's arrest on narcotics charges in mid-1953, leading to six months at Sheriff's Honor Farm. Both Mulligan and Baker had, like many of their peers, become heroin addicts. However, while Mulligan was in prison, Baker transformed his lyrical trumpet style, gentle tenor voice and matinee-idol looks into independent stardom. Thus, when upon his release Mulligan attempted to rehire Baker, the trumpeter declined the offer for financial reasons. They did briefly reunite at the 1955 Newport Jazz Festival and would occasionally get together for performances and recordings up through a 1974 performance at Carnegie Hall. But in later years their relationship became strained as Mulligan would eventually permanently end his drug abuse while Baker’s continual drug use caused problems until his death in 1988.

=== Middle career ===
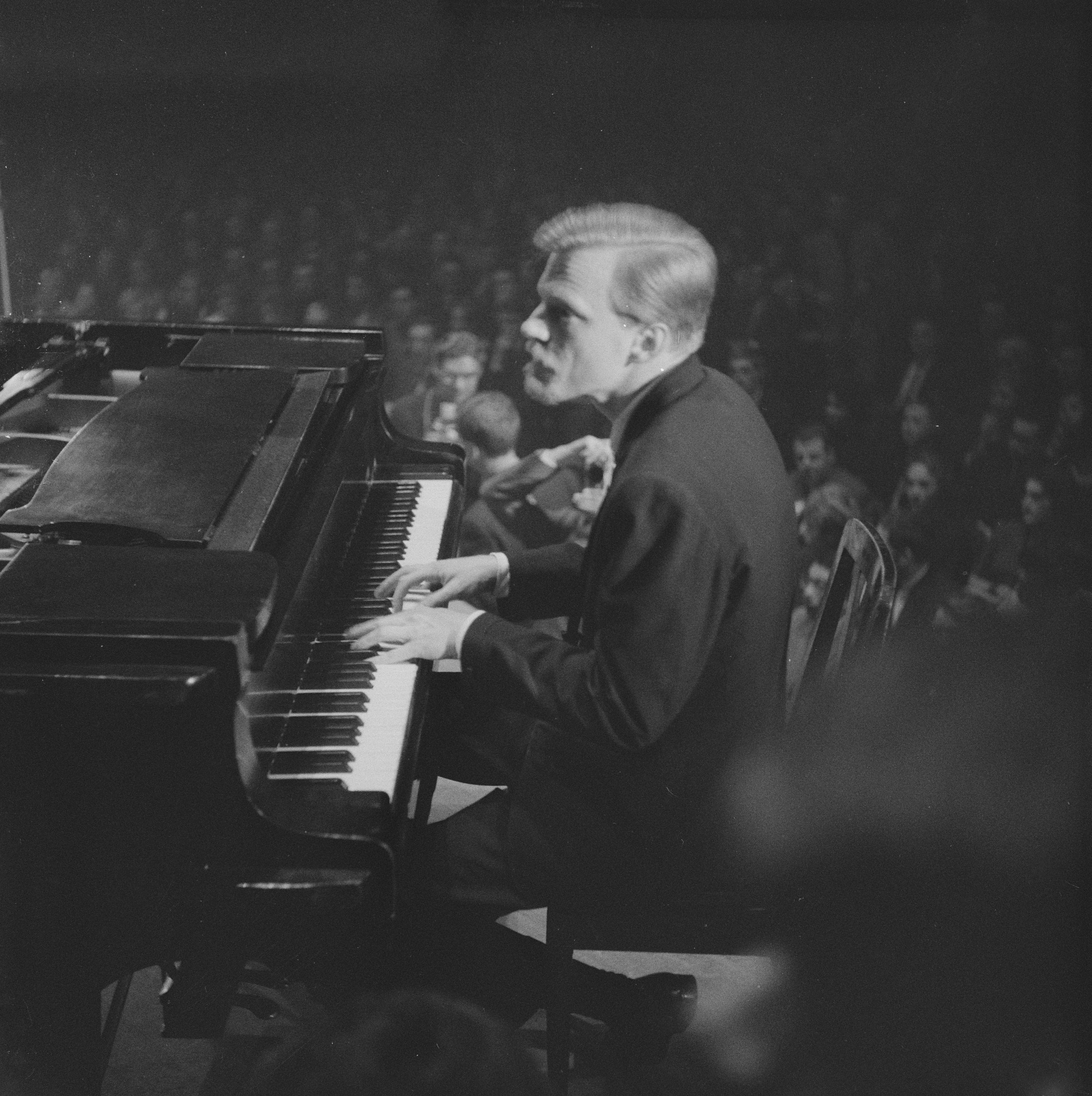
Mulligan on piano in the Netherlands in 1960

Mulligan continued the quartet format with valve trombonist Bob Brookmeyer replacing Baker, although Mulligan and Brookmeyer both occasionally played piano. The quartet played at the third Paris Jazz Fair in 1954, with Red Mitchell on bass and Frank Isola on drums. This quartet structure remained the core of Mulligan's groups throughout the rest of the 1950s, with sporadic personnel changes and expansions of the group with trumpeters Jon Eardley and Art Farmer; saxophonists Zoot Sims, Al Cohn and Lee Konitz; and vocalist Annie Ross.

Mulligan also studied piano with Suezenne Fordham, who was a member of the inner circle of jazz players in New York. She was sought out by jazz musicians of the era to coach them to improve their piano technique. She and Mulligan also had a personal relationship from 1966 through 1972.

Mulligan also performed as a soloist or sideman (often in festival settings) with a variety of late-1950s jazz artists: Paul Desmond, Duke Ellington, Ben Webster, Johnny Hodges, Jimmy Witherspoon, André Previn, Billie Holiday, Marian McPartland, Louis Armstrong, Count Basie, Stan Getz, Thelonious Monk, Fletcher Henderson, Manny Albam, Quincy Jones, Kai Winding, Miles Davis, and Dave Brubeck. Mulligan appeared in Art Kane's A Great Day in Harlem portrait of 57 major jazz musicians taken in August 1958.

Mulligan formed his first "Concert Jazz Band" in the spring of 1960. Partly an attempt to revisit big band music in a smaller setting, the band varied in size and personnel, with the core group being six brass, five reeds (including Mulligan) and a pianoless two-piece rhythm section (though as in the earlier quartets Mulligan or Brookmeyer sometimes doubled on piano). The membership included (at various times, among others): trumpeters Conte Candoli, Nick Travis, Clark Terry, Don Ferrara, Al Derisi, Thad Jones and Doc Severinsen; saxophonists Zoot Sims, Jim Reider, Gene Allen, Bobby Donovan, Phil Woods, and Gene Quill; trombonists Willie Dennis; Alan Raph and Bob Brookmeyer; drummers Mel Lewis and Gus Johnson; and bassists Buddy Clark and Bill Crow. The band also recorded an album of songs sung by Mulligan's girlfriend Judy Holliday in 1961. The band toured and recorded extensively through the end of 1964, eventually recording five albums for Verve Records.

Mulligan resumed work with small groups in 1962 and appeared with other groups sporadically (notably in festival situations). Mulligan continued to work intermittently in small group settings until the end of his life, although performing dates started to become more infrequent during the mid 1960s. After Dave Brubeck's quartet broke up in 1967, Mulligan began appearing regularly with Brubeck as the "Gerry Mulligan / Dave Brubeck Quartet" through 1973. After that Mulligan and Brubeck worked together sporadically until the final year of Mulligan's life.

In 1971, Mulligan created his most significant work for big band in over a decade, for the album The Age of Steam. At various times in the 1970s, he performed with Charles Mingus. The Concert Jazz Band was "reformed" with younger players, including a full-time pianist in Mitchel Forman, in 1978, and toured during the 1980s.

=== Orchestral work ===
Mulligan, like many jazz musicians of his era, occasionally recorded with strings. Dates included 1957 recordings with Vinnie Burke's String Jazz Quartet, a 1959 orchestra album with André Previn and a 1965 album of the Gerry Mulligan Quintet and Strings. In 1974, Mulligan recorded in Italy the album Summit with Argentine tango musician Ástor Piazzolla. While in Milan for the recording sessions, Mulligan met his future wife, Countess Franca Rota Borghini Baldovinetti, a freelance photojournalist and reporter. In 1975, Mulligan recorded an album with Italian pianist / composer Enrico Intra, bassist/arranger Pino Presti, flutist Giancarlo Barigozzi, and drummer Tullio De Piscopo. Mulligan's more classical work with orchestras began in May 1970 with a performance of Dave Brubeck's oratorio, The Light in the Wilderness with Erich Kunzel and the Cincinnati Symphony.

In the 1970s and 1980s, Mulligan worked to build and promote a repertoire of baritone saxophone music for orchestra. In 1973, Mulligan commissioned composer Frank Proto to write a Saxophone Concerto that was premiered with the Cincinnati Symphony. In 1977, the Canadian Broadcasting Corporation commissioned Harry Freedman to write the saxophone concerto Celebration, which was performed by Mulligan with the CBC Symphony. In 1982, Zubin Mehta invited Mulligan to play soprano saxophone in a New York Philharmonic performance of Ravel's Boléro.

In 1984, Mulligan commissioned Harry Freedman to write The Sax Chronicles, which was an arrangement of some of Mulligan's melodies in pastiche styles. In April of that year, Mulligan was a soloist with the New American Orchestra in Los Angeles for the premiere of Patrick Williams' Spring Wings.

In June 1984, Mulligan completed and performed his first orchestral commission, Entente for Baritone Saxophone and Orchestra, with the Filarmonia Venetia. In October, Mulligan performed Entente and The Sax Chronicles with the London Symphony Orchestra.

In 1987, Mulligan adapted K-4 Pacific (from his 1971 Age of Steam big band recording) for quartet with orchestra and performed it beside Entente with the Israel Philharmonic in Tel Aviv with Zubin Mehta conducting. Mulligan's orchestral appearances at the time also included the Houston Symphony, Stockholm Philharmonic and New York Philharmonic.

In 1988, Mulligan's Octet for Sea Cliff was premiered. A chamber work, it was commissioned by the Sea Cliff Chamber Players. In 1991, the Concordia Orchestra premiered Momo's Clock, a work for orchestra (without saxophone solo) that was inspired by a book by German author Michael Ende.

=== Last years ===
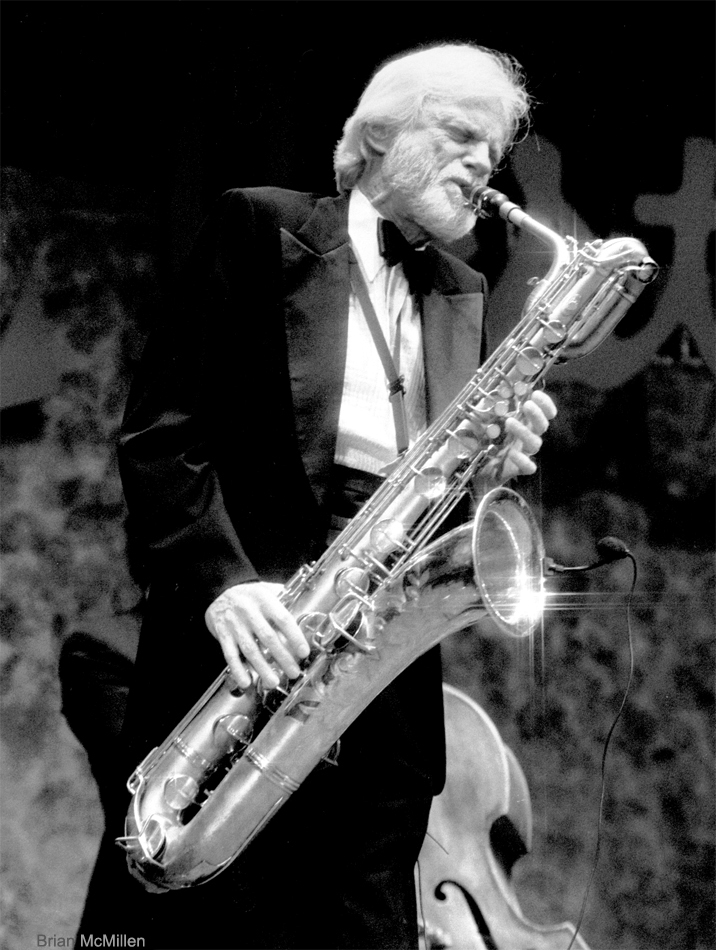
Gerry Mulligan at Monterey Jazz Festival 1992

Throughout Mulligan's orchestral work and until the end of his life, Mulligan maintained an active career performing and recording jazz – usually with a quartet that included a piano.

In June 1988, Mulligan was invited to be the first composer-in-residence at the Glasgow International Jazz Festival and was commissioned to write a work, which he titled The Flying Scotsman. In 1991, Mulligan contacted Miles Davis about revisiting the music from the seminal 1949 Birth of the Cool album. Davis had recently performed some of his Gil Evans collaborations with Quincy Jones at the Montreux Jazz Festival and was enthusiastic. However, Davis died in September and Mulligan continued the recording project and tour with Wallace Roney and Art Farmer substituting for Davis. Re-Birth of the Cool (released in 1992) featured the charts from Birth of the Cool, and a nonet which included Lewis and Barber from the original Davis band. Mulligan appeared at the Brecon Jazz Festival in 1991. Mulligan's final recording was a quartet album (with guests), Dragonfly, recorded in the summer of 1995 and released on the Telarc label. Mulligan gave his final performance on the 13th Annual Floating Jazz Festival, Caribbean Cruise, November 9, 1995.

Mulligan died in Darien, Connecticut, on January 20, 1996, at the age of 68, following complications from knee surgery. His widow Franca—to whom he had been married since 1982—said he had also been suffering from liver cancer. Upon Mulligan's death, his library and numerous personal effects (including a gold-plated Conn baritone saxophone) were given to the Library of Congress. 'The Gerry Mulligan Collection' is open to registered public researchers in the library's Performing Arts Research Center. The library placed Mulligan's saxophone on permanent exhibit in early 2009.

== Theatre and film ==
Mulligan's first film appearance was probably with Krupa's orchestra playing alto saxophone in the RKO short film Follow That Music (1946). Mulligan had small roles in the films I Want to Live! (1958), as a jazz combo member; Jazz on a Summer's Day (1960), featuring his performance at the 1958 Newport Jazz Festival; The Rat Race (1960), in which he appears as a tenor saxophonist instead of his usual instrument; The Subterraneans (1960) and Bells Are Ringing (also 1960) with his then partner, Judy Holliday. Mulligan also performed numerous times on television programmes during his career.

As a film composer, Mulligan wrote music for A Thousand Clowns (1965, the title theme), the film version of the Broadway comedy Luv (1967), the French films La Menace (1977) and Les Petites galères (1977, with Ástor Piazzolla) and I'm Not Rappaport (1996, the title theme).

In 1974, Mulligan collaborated on a musical version of Anita Loos' play Happy Birthday. Although the creative team had great hopes for the work, it never made it past a workshop production at the University of Alabama. In 1978, Mulligan wrote incidental music for Dale Wasserman's Broadway play Play with Fire.

In 1995, the Hal Leonard Corporation released the video tape The Gerry Mulligan Workshop – A Master Class on Jazz and Its Legendary Players.

== Personal life ==
Mulligan married Jeffie Lee Boyd in 1953, but the marriage was annulled. Later that same year he married Arlyne Brown, the daughter of songwriter Lew Brown. Their son, Reed Brown Mulligan, was born in 1957. The couple divorced in 1959.

Mulligan spent the next six years with actress and singer Judy Holliday, with whom he recorded an album, Holliday With Mulligan. Holliday died of cancer in 1965. After Holliday’s death, Mulligan met actress Sandy Dennis. According to her manager, Bill Treusch, Dennis and Mulligan never married, but were together from 1965 to 1976. In 1974, Mulligan met Countess Franca Rota Borghini Baldovinetti through their mutual friend Astor Piazzolla, although they did not marry until 1982. They remained together until his death.

== Awards ==
- 1981 Grammy Award for Walk on the Water (Best Jazz Instrumental Performance by a Big Band)
- 1981 Grammy nominations for the albums The Age of Steam, For an Unfinished Woman and Soft Lights and Sweet Music
- 1982 Birth of the Cool album inducted into the Grammy Hall of Fame
- 1982 Connecticut Arts Award
- 1984 Viotti Prize (Vercelli, Italy)
- 1984 Inducted into the Big Band and Jazz Hall of Fame
- 1988 Duke Ellington Fellow at Yale University
- 1989 Received keys to the city of Trieste, Italy
- 1990 Philadelphia Music Foundation Hall of Fame
- 1991 American Jazz Hall of Fame
- 1992 Lionel Hampton School of Music Hall of Fame
- 1992 Guest composer at the Mertens Contemporary American Composer's Festival, University of Bridgeport, Connecticut
- 1994 Down Beat Jazz Hall of Fame
- 1995 Artists Committee for the Kennedy Center Honors for the Performing Arts
- 1953–1995, winner for 42 consecutive years, of the Down Beat magazine reader's poll for: Outstanding baritone saxophonist

== Discography ==
=== As leader/co-leader ===
- 1950: The Gerry Mulligan Quartet/Gerry Mulligan with the Chubby Jackson Big Band – The big band sides are from 1950, the band led by bassist Jackson included Howard McGhee, Zoot Sims, and J. J. Johnson. The quartet sides, with Chet Baker were recorded at two sessions in 1952.
- 1951: Mulligan Plays Mulligan (Prestige, 1951)[10 inch] – reissued as Historically Speaking (1957)[LP]
- 1952: Gerry Mulligan Quartet Volume 1 (Pacific Jazz, 1952)[10 inch]
- 1953: Lee Konitz Plays with the Gerry Mulligan Quartet (Pacific Jazz, 1953) [10 inch] – reissued as a compilation album with the same title and previously unreleased tracks and alternate takes (1957)[LP]
- 1953: Gerry Mulligan Quartet Volume 2 (Pacific Jazz, 1953)[10 inch]
- 1953: Gene Norman Presents the Original Gerry Mulligan Tentet and Quartet (GNP, 1954)[10 inch]
- 1954: Paris Concert (Vogue/Pacific Jazz, 1955) – live
- 1954: California Concerts (Pacific Jazz, 1955) – live
- 1954: Gerry Mulligan Quartet – Paris Concert (Vogue – 655610 1954) – live
- 1955: Presenting the Gerry Mulligan Sextet (EmArcy, 1955)
- 1955-1956: Profil (Mercury, 1958) – a.k.a. A Profile of Gerry Mulligan
- 1956: Mainstream of Jazz (EmArcy, 1956)
- 1956: Recorded in Boston at Storyville with Bob Brookmeyer (Pacific Jazz, 1957) – live
- 1957: The Teddy Wilson Trio & Gerry Mulligan Quartet with Bob Brookmeyer at Newport (Verve, 1957) – live
- 1946–1957: The Arranger (Columbia, 1977) – reissued as Mullenium (1998) with bonus tracks
- 1957: Jazz Giants '58 with Stan Getz and Harry Edison (Verve, 1958) – also issued as Gerry's Time (VSP, 1966)
- 1957: Mulligan Meets Monk with Thelonious Monk (Riverside, 1957)
- 1957: Blues in Time with Paul Desmond (Verve, 1957) – also released as Gerry Mulligan/Paul Desmond Quartet
- 1957: Gerry Mulligan Meets Stan Getz with Stan Getz (Verve, 1957) – also released as Getz Meets Mulligan in Hi–Fi
- 1957: Jazz Concerto Grosso with Bob Brookmeyer (ABC–Paramount, 1958) – play Phil Sunkel
- 1957: The Gerry Mulligan Songbook (World Pacific, 1958)
- 1957: Reunion with Chet Baker with Chet Baker (World Pacific, 1958)
- 1958: I Want to Live! with Johnny Mandel, et al. (United Artists, 1958) – soundtrack
- 1957–1958: Annie Ross Sings a Song with Mulligan! with Annie Ross (World Pacific, 1959)
- 1958–1959: What Is There to Say? (Columbia, 1959)
- 1959: Gerry Mulligan Meets Johnny Hodges with Johnny Hodges (Verve, 1960)
- 1959: Gerry Mulligan Meets Ben Webster with Ben Webster (Verve, 1960)
- 1960: The Concert Jazz Band (Verve, 1960)
- 1960: Gerry Mulligan and the Concert Jazz Band on Tour (Verve, 1962) – live
- 1960: Gerry Mulligan and the Concert Jazz Band at the Village Vanguard (Verve, 1961) – live
- 1961: Holliday with Mulligan with Judy Holliday (DRG, 1980)
- 1961: Gerry Mulligan Presents a Concert in Jazz (Verve, 1961)
- 1962: The Gerry Mulligan Quartet (Verve, 1962)
- 1962: Jeru (Columbia, 1962)
- 1962: Two of a Mind with Paul Desmond (RCA Victor, 1962)
- 1962: Spring Is Sprung (Philips, 1963)
- 1962: Gerry Mulligan '63 (Verve, 1963)
- 1962: Night Lights (Philips, 1963)
- 1963–1964: Butterfly with Hiccups (Limelight, 1964)
- 1965: If You Can't Beat 'Em, Join 'Em! (Limelight, 1965)
- 1965: Feelin' Good (Limelight, 1965)
- 1966: Something Borrowed - Something Blue (Limelight, 1966)
- 1968?: Blues Roots with the Dave Brubeck Trio (Columbia, 1968)
- 1970: Live at the Berlin Philharmonie with the Dave Brubeck Trio (Columbia, 1972)[2LP] – live
- 1971: Age of Steam (A&M, 1972)
- 1974: Summit with Astor Piazzolla (Erre T.V./Festival, 1974)
- 1974: Carnegie Hall Concert with Chet Baker (CTI, 1975) – live
- 1975: Gerry Mulligan Meets Enrico Intra with Enrico Intra (Produttori Associati, 1976)
- 1980: Walk on the Water with his orchestra (DRG, 1980)
- 1983?: Little Big Horn (GRP, 1983)
- 1986: Soft Lights and Sweet Music with Scott Hamilton (Concord, 1986)
- 1987: Symphonic Dreams `Entente' with Erich Kunzel, Houston Symphony (PAR, 1987) – live
- 1990?: Lonesome Boulevard (A&M, 1990)
- 1992: Re–Birth of the Cool (GRP, 1992)
- 1993: Billy Taylor & Gerry Mulligan: Live at MCG with Billy Taylor (MCG Jazz, 2007) – live
- 1993?: Paraiso Jazz Brazil with Jane Duboc (Telarc Jazz, 1993)
- 1994: Gerry Mulligan Quartet, Dream a Little Dream (Telarc Jazz, 1994)
- 1995: Gerry Mulligan Quartet, Dragonfly (Telarc Jazz, 1995)
- 1995: Midas Touch: Live in Berlin (Concord, 2003) – live

=== As sideman ===
With Dave Brubeck

- 1968: Compadres (Columbia, 1968) – live
- 1968?: Blues Roots (Columbia, 1968)
- 1970: Live at the Berlin Philharmonie (Columbia, 1972) – live
- 1971: The Last Set at Newport (Atlantic, 1972) – live
- 1971: Brubeck / Mulligan / Cincinnati (MCA, 1971) – live
- 1972: We're All Together Again for the First Time (Atlantic, 1973) – live

With Charles Mingus

- 1972: Charles Mingus and Friends in Concert (Columbia, 1973) – live
- 1977: Lionel Hampton Presents Charles Mingus (Who's Who in Jazz, 1977)

With Billy Taylor

- 1957: My Fair Lady Loves Jazz (ABC–Paramount, 1964) – 1 track
- 1992: Dr. T (GRP, 1993)

With Others

- Manny Albam, The Jazz Greats of Our Time Vol. 1 (MCA, 1957)
- Miles Davis, Birth of the Cool (Capitol, 1957)
- Stan Getz, Stan Getz Plays Blues (VSP (Verve), 1966)
- Lionel Hampton, Lionel Hampton presents Gerry Mulligan (Who's Who in Jazz, 1977)
- John Hill, Six Moons Of Jupiter (Finders Keepers, 2009)
- Billie Holiday et al., At Monterey / 1958 (BlackHawk, 1986)
- Quincy Jones, The Hot Rock (Prophesy, 1972)
- Michel Legrand, Le Jazz Grand (Gryphon, 1979)
- Barry Manilow, 2:00 AM Paradise Cafe (Arista, 1984)
- Jay McShann, The Big Apple Bash (Atlantic, 1979)
- Sergio Mendes and Pelé, Pelé (Atlantic, 1977)
- André Previn and Carmen McRae, The Subterraneans (soundtrack) (MGM, 1960)
- Mel Tormé and George Shearing, The Classic Concert Live (Concord, 2005) – live

=== As composer ===
- 1955: Elliot Lawrence - Elliot Lawrence Band Plays Gerry Mulligan Arrangements (Verve) - track 1, "The Rocker"; track 3, "Happy Hooligan"; track 5, "Bweebida Bwobbida"; track 6, "Mullinium"; track 8, "Apple Core"; track 9, "Elegy for Two Clarinets"; track 10, "The Swinging Door"; track 12, "Mr. President"
- 1955: Gene Krupa - Gene Krupa (Columbia) - track 5, "Disc Jockey Jump" (1947) (co-written with Gene Krupa)
- 1956: Kenny Clarke's Sextet - Plays André Hodeir (Philips) track 6, "Jeru"
- 1956: Chet Baker Chet Baker & Crew - track 4, "Revelation"
- 1958: Carl Stevens - "Skin" And Bones (Mercury) - track 1, "Walkin' Shoes"
- 1959: Gene Krupa Plays Gerry Mulligan Arrangements (Verve) - track 1, "Bird House"; track 3, "Mulligan Stew"; track 6, "The Way of all Flesh"; track 8, "Birds of a Feather"
- 1960: Chet Baker - Sextet & Quartet (Music) (In Milan, Jazzland) - track 4, "Line for Lyons"
- 1961: Brew Moore - Live In Europe 1961 (Sonorama) released in 2015 - track 2, "Apple Core"
- 1961: Charlie Parker - "Bird" Is Free (Musidisc) - track 1, "Rocker"
- 1976: Paul Desmond - Live (2 LP with Ed Bickert) (Horizon) "Line For Lyons" (Verve reissue CD bonus track)
- 1982: Dave Grusin - Out Of The Shadows (GRP) - track 4, "Five Brothers"
- 2004: Keith Jarrett / Gary Peacock / Jack DeJohnette - The Out-Of-Towners (ECM) - track 5, "Five Brothers"
- 2008: The Dutch Jazz Orchestra - Moon Dreams - Rediscovered Music Of Gil Evans & Gerry Mulligan (Challenge) - track 5, "Joost At The Roost"; track 7, "The Major And The Minor"; track 10, "Brew's Tune"
- 2010: Trudy Kerr and Ingrid James - Reunion (Jazzizit) - track 4, "Soft Shoe"
