= Bill Crow =

American jazz bassist (born 1927)

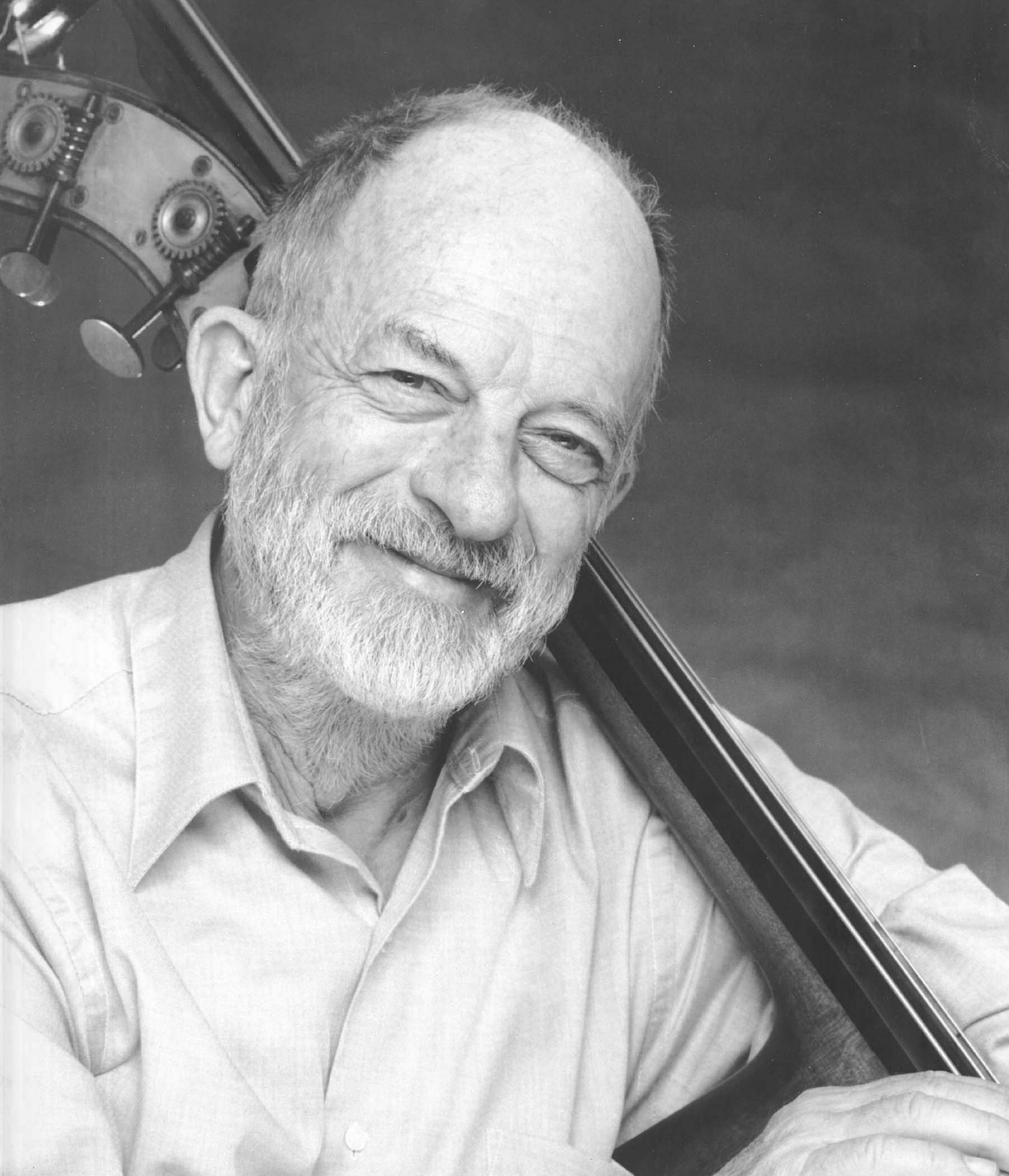

Background information
- Born: William Orval Crow; December 27, 1927 (age 98); Othello, Washington, U.S.
- Genre: Jazz
- Occupations: Musician, author
- Instruments: Bass, tuba
- Years active: 1950s–present
- Label: Venus
- Website: www.billcrowbass.com

William Orval Crow (born December 27, 1927) is an American jazz bassist. Among other work, Crow was the long-term bassist in saxophonist Gerry Mulligan's bands in the 1950s and 1960s.

== Early life ==
Crow was born on December 27, 1927, in Othello, Washington, but spent his childhood in Kirkland, Washington. In fourth grade, he took up the trumpet, and in sixth grade, he switched to baritone horn. He played drums in his high school swing band. He joined the United States Army in 1946, where he played the baritone horn in the 2nd Army Band and drums in a Service Club band. He remained in the Army until 1949. After leaving the Army, he played drums and valve trombone while a student at the University of Washington.

== Career ==
In 1950, Crow moved to New York City, playing the valve trombone and drums. On a summer job at the Altamont Hotel in Tupper Lake, New York, he taught himself to play the string bass. Within two years of starting to play bass, he played with Teddy Charles and was with Stan Getz from October 1952 to April of the following year. He joined the Claude Thornhill band for the summer of 1953, moved to the Terry Gibbs Quartet that fall, and in 1954 moved to the Marian McPartland Trio at the Hickory House in New York City, with Joe Morello at the drums. He was the bassist with Gerry Mulligan's sextet and quartet and the Mulligan Concert Jazz Band during the mid to late 1950s and early 1960s. While with Mulligan, he studied the bass with Fred Zimmerman, of the New York Philharmonic. In 1956, he was with Jay and Kai (J.J. Johnson and Kai Winding) for several engagements, including the Newport Jazz Festival. In 1962, he joined the Benny Goodman band for a summer tour of the Soviet Union.

"Crow joined the house band at Eddie Condon's club in 1965 and then played with Walter Norris’s small group, which was one of the house bands at the Playboy Club in New York (1965–71)." "In 1972 and 1973 he played Fender bass on society club dates with Peter Duchin's band and played occasional bookings with the Bob Brookmeyer/Clark Terry Quintet. From 1975 into the late 1990s he worked in theater orchestras for Broadway shows (where he sometimes played tuba) and during that time he also played engagements with Al Cohn and Zoot Sims." In 1983, he was elected to the Executive Board of Local 802, the musicians' union of Greater New York, where he served for 20 years.

He wrote a book called Jazz Anecdotes that was published by Oxford University Press in 1991. A revised paperback edition of Jazz Anecdotes was published in 2005 with over 100 added stories. It is titled Jazz Anecdotes, Second Time Around. Crow's autobiography, From Birdland to Broadway, was released by the same publisher two years later.

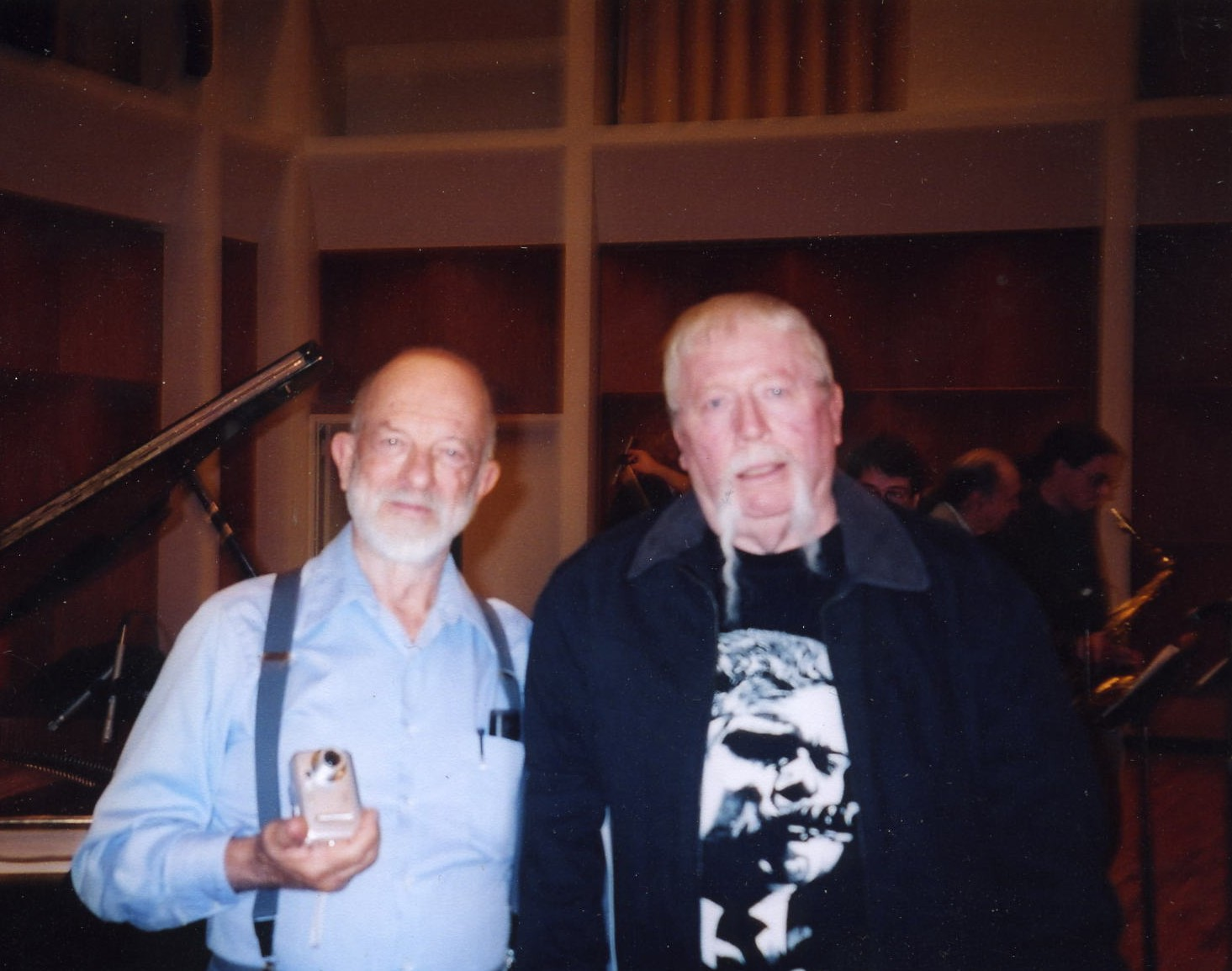
Bill Crow and drummer Dick Sheridan

== Discography ==
=== As leader ===
- From Birdland to Broadway (Venus, 1995, 2002)
- Jazz Anecdotes (Venus, 1996)

=== As sideman ===
With Gerry Mulligan

- Recorded in Boston at Storyville (Pacific Jazz, 1956)
- Mainstream of Jazz (EmArcy, 1956)
- Annie Ross Sings a Song with Mulligan! (World Pacific, 1958)
- The New Gerry Mulligan Quartet (1959)
- What Is There to Say? (1959)
- Gerry Mulligan and the Concert Jazz Band at the Village Vanguard (Verve, 1960)
- Gerry Mulligan Presents a Concert in Jazz (Verve, 1961)
- Holliday with Mulligan (DRG, 1961 [1980]) with Judy Holliday
- The Gerry Mulligan Quartet (Verve, 1962)
- Gerry Mulligan '63 (Verve, 1963)
- Night Lights (Philips, 1963)
- Spring Is Sprung (Philips, 1962)
- Butterfly with Hiccups (Limelight, 1964)
- New York (December 1960), 1989
- Moonlight in Vermont, 1991
- Double Exposure, 1992
- Jazz 'Round Midnight, 1992
- Newport Jazz Festival: Mulligan in the Main, Vol. 2, 1992
- News from Blueport, 1996

With Stan Getz

- Yesterday, (JazzLive)
- Stan Getz Plays (Norgran, 1954)
- West Coast Jazz, 1955
- The Sound, 1956
- Stan Getz and the Cool Sounds (Verve, 1953–55, [1957])
- Stella by Starlight, 1993
- Sweetie Pie, 1993
- A Life in Jazz: A Musical Biography, 1996
- Yesterdays: Stan Getz Plays the Standards, 2004
- Getz for Lovers, 2002
- Music for Lovers, 2006
- Body and Soul (Universal/Verve, 2006)

with Zoot Sims

- Either Way (Fred Miles Presents, 1961)
- Suitably Zoot 1965
- At the Half Note, 2000
- At the Half Note Again, 2006

With Bob Brookmeyer

- Whooeeee (Storyville, 1956)
- The Street Swingers (World Pacific, 1957)
- 7 x Wilder (Verve, 1961)
- Tonight (Mainstream, 1965)

With Al Cohn

- Jazz Mission to Moscow (Colpix, 1962)

with Clark Terry

- More/Tread Ye Lightly (1963)
- The Power of Positive Swinging (Mainstream, 1965)

with Marian McPartland

- After Dark (1956)
- 85 Candles: Live in New York (2005)

With J. J. Johnson

- Dave Brubeck and Jay & Kai at Newport (Columbia, 1956)
- Jay and Kai (Columbia, 1957)
- Trombone for Two J.J. Johnson (1956)

With Al Haig

- Al Haig Trio (Esoteric, 1954)
- Al Haig, Jazz Will-O'-The-Wisp (Everest, 1954)

With Jimmy Cleveland

- A Map of Jimmy Cleveland (Mercury, 1959)

With Milt Jackson

- The Ballad Artistry of Milt Jackson (Atlantic, 1959)

With others

- 1954 Jimmy Raney Quintet (Prestige)
- 1955 Jackie and Roy (Storyville)
- 1956 Shades of Sal Salvador
- 1956 Musically Yours, Sam Most (Bethlehem)
- 1957 The Voices of Don Elliott
- 1957 Candido the Volcanic (ABC Paramount)
- 1958 The Music Man Goes Dixieland Jimmy McPartland (Epic)
- 1959 On Campus!, Teddy Charles
- 1960 Jazz at the Modern, George Wein (Bethlehem)
- 1960 Swing, Swing, Swing, Benny Goodman
- 1960 I Love the Life I Live, Mose Allison
- 1960 A Taste of Honey, Bobby Scott (Atlantic)
- 1961 Sophisticated Lady, Manny Albam (Coral)
- 1962 Jazz Goes to the Movies, Manny Albam
- 1962 Love is a Necessary Evil, Don Elliott with Irma Curry (Columbia)
- 1962 It's About Time, Joe Morello (RCA Victor)
- 1962 Benny Goodman in Moscow, (RCA Victor)
- 1976 Them There Eyes, Ruby Braff (Sonet)
- 1978 Original Wilber, Bob Wilber
- 1981 An Evening With Bill Crofut,(ProArte)
- 1992 Live at Birdland, Eddie Bert
- 1992 Some Blues, Jay McShann
- 1994 American Songbook Series: Jule Styne
- 1994 Hoagy's Children, Vol. 1, Bob Dorough / Barbara Lea / Dick Sudhalter
- 1994 Hoagy's Children, Vol. 2, Bob Dorough / Barbara Lea / Dick Sudhalter
- 1995 Early Quintets, Phil Woods
- 1995 With Pleasure, Dick Sudhalter
- 2002 Jazz in Paris: Piano aux Champs-Elysees, Ronnell Bright/Art Simmons
- 2004 Sunday Session, Rich Peare
- 2005 The CTS Session, Spike Robinson
- 2000 Autumn in New York, Claude Williamson Trio (Venus)
- 2010 I Remember You, Michelle Leblanc

Broadway Shows

- 1977 The King and I (RCA Red Seal)
- 1979 The Grand Tour, Joel Grey (Columbia)
- 1979 Carmelina Georgia Brown (Original Cast Records)
- 1980 42ND STREET (RCA Red Seal)

== Books ==
- Jazz Anecdotes, Oxford University Press 1990.
- From Birdland to Broadway: Scenes from a jazz life, Oxford University Press 1992.
- Jazz Anecdotes, Second Time Around, Oxford University Press 2005.
