= Gene Allen (musician) =

American jazz reedist (1928–2008)

- Birth name: Eugene Sufana Allen
- Born: December 5, 1928; East Chicago, Indiana, U.S.
- Died: February 14, 2008 (aged 79)
- Genres: Jazz
- Instruments: Baritone saxophone, bass clarinet

Eugene Sufana Allen (December 5, 1928 – February 14, 2008) was an American jazz reedist, who primarily played baritone saxophone and bass clarinet.

== Early life ==
Allen was born in East Chicago, Indiana. He began playing clarinet and piano as a child, and was playing with Louis Prima at age 15 in 1944. One of nine children, Allen's parents were immigrants from Romania.

== Career ==
Allen stayed in Prima's band until 1947, then worked with Claude Thornhill in 1949–1950 and Tex Beneke in 1951–1953. In 1953 he began playing with the Sauter-Finegan Orchestra, playing with them intermittently until 1961, and also worked with Tommy Dorsey, Benny Goodman, and Hal McKusick in the 1950s. Toward the end of the decade, and into the early 1960s, he worked with Gerry Mulligan, Manny Albam, Woody Herman, Thelonious Monk, and Bob Brookmeyer. Later associations include work with Urbie Green, Mundell Lowe, Rod Levitt, and Rusty Dedrick. In the calendar year of 1963, Allen successively played in and recorded with the big bands of Benny Goodman, Thelonious Monk, and Woody Herman.
