= Nick Travis =

American jazz musician

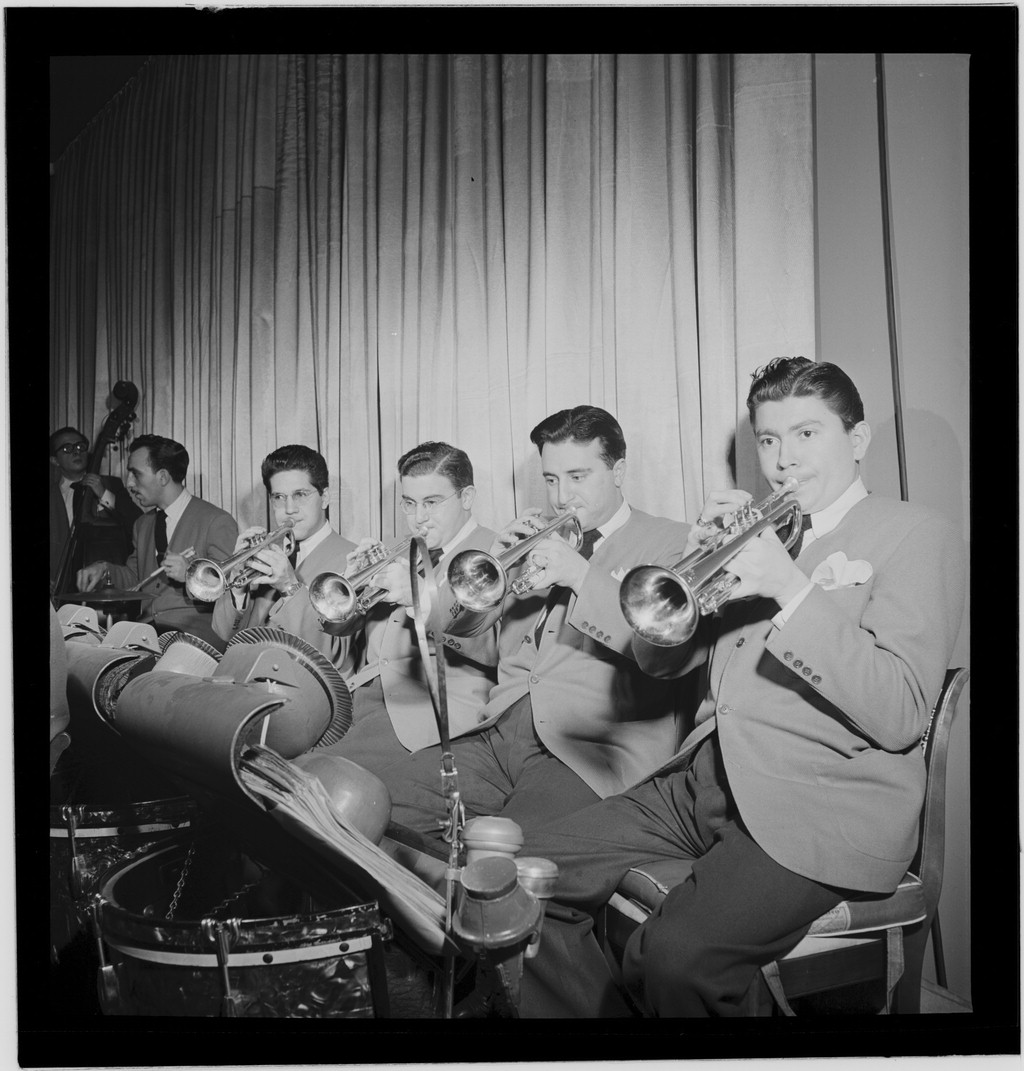

Background information
- Born: November 16, 1925; Philadelphia, Pennsylvania
- Died: October 7, 1964 (aged 38) New York City
- Genres: jazz
- Instrument: Trumpet
- Years active: 1940 - 1964

Nick Travis (November 16, 1925, in Philadelphia, Pennsylvania – October 7, 1964, in New York City) was an American jazz trumpeter.

== Biography ==
Travis started playing professionally at age fifteen, performing during the early 1940s with Johnny McGhee, Vido Musso (1942), Mitchell Ayres, and Woody Herman (1942–44).

In 1944, he joined the military; after his World War II service he played with Ray McKinley (1946–50, intermittent), Benny Goodman (1948–49), Gene Krupa, Ina Ray Hutton, Tommy Dorsey, Tex Beneke, Herman once more (1950–51), Jerry Gray, Bob Chester, Elliot Lawrence, and Jimmy Dorsey (1952–53). From 1953-56 he was a soloist in the Sauter-Finegan Orchestra.

He then became a session musician for NBC, and also performed with Gerry Mulligan (1960–62) and Thelonious Monk (1963, at Lincoln Center).

Most of Travis's work was in big bands, but he also played in small ensembles with Al Cohn (1953) and Zoot Sims (1956). He led one session for Victor Records in 1954.

== Death ==
In 1964, Travis died at age 38 as a result of complications from ulcers.

== Discography ==
With Bob Brookmeyer

- Brookmeyer (Vik, 1956)
- Jazz Concerto Grosso (ABC-Paramount, 1957) with Gerry Mulligan and Phil Sunkel
- Portrait of the Artist (Atlantic, 1960)
- Gloomy Sunday and Other Bright Moments (Verve, 1961)

With Al Cohn

- Al Cohn's Tones (Savoy, 1953 [1956])
- Four Brass One Tenor (RCA Victor, 1955)
- Son of Drum Suite (RCA Victor, 1960)

With Art Farmer

- The Aztec Suite (United Artists, 1959)

With Dizzy Gillespie

- Carnegie Hall Concert (Verve, 1961)
- Perceptions (Verve, 1961)

With Benny Golson

- Take a Number from 1 to 10 (Argo, 1961)

With Jimmy Giuffre

- The Music Man (Atlantic, 1958)

With Urbie Green

- All About Urbie Green and His Big Band (ABC-Paramount, 1956)

With Coleman Hawkins

- The Hawk in Hi Fi (RCA Victor, 1956)
- The Hawk in Paris (Vik, 1956)

With Quincy Jones

- The Great Wide World of Quincy Jones (Mercury, 1959)

With John Lewis

- Essence (Atlantic, 1962)

With Thelonious Monk

- Thelonious Monk Big Band and Quartet in Concert - Live (Columbia Jazz Masterpieces, 1964)

With Gerry Mulligan

- The Concert Jazz Band (Verve, 1960)
- Gerry Mulligan and the Concert Jazz Band on Tour (Verve, 1960 [1962])
- Gerry Mulligan and the Concert Jazz Band at the Village Vanguard (Verve, 1960 [1961])
- Holliday with Mulligan (DRG, 1961 [1980]) with Judy Holliday
- Gerry Mulligan Presents a Concert in Jazz (Verve, 1961)
- Gerry Mulligan '63 (Verve, 1963)

With Mark Murphy

- That's How I Love the Blues! (Riverside, 1962)

With Joe Newman

- Salute to Satch (RCA Victor, 1956)

With Zoot Sims

- Zoot! (Riverside, 1956)

With Own Quintet

- The Panic Is On! (Hallmark, 1990)
