= Readings by Jack Kerouac on the Beat Generation =

Studio album by Jack Kerouac
- Released: January 1960
- Recorded: 1959
- Genre: Spoken word
- Length: 41:32
- Label: Verve
- Producer: Bill Randle

Jack Kerouac chronology
Blues and Haikus (1959)	Readings by Jack Kerouac on the Beat Generation (1960)	The Jack Kerouac Collection (1990)

Alternate cover
- Cover of the 1997 remastered CD reissue

Readings by Jack Kerouac on the Beat Generation is the third and final spoken word album by the American novelist and poet Jack Kerouac, released in January 1960 on Verve Records. The album was recorded during 1959, prior to the publication of Kerouac's sixth novel, Doctor Sax.

== Composition ==
Jack Kerouac had released the albums Poetry for the Beat Generation and Blues and Haikus in 1959, following the publication of his book The Dharma Bums. Both records featured Kerouac reading his work with jazz-based accompaniment. For Readings by Jack Kerouac on the Beat Generation, however, Kerouac decided to record a wholly spoken word album. Despite the album having no musical accompaniment, biographer Gerald Nicosia stated that "the musicality of Kerouac's art is best exemplified by the Readings album."

Several readings on the album are from Kerouac's written works. The opening track, "San Francisco Scene (The Beat Generation)", is read from extracts of Desolation Angels. Extracts from the novel The Subterraneans and the poetry collection San Francisco Blues are also featured. "Visions of Neal" features extracts from the original drafts of Kerouac's most notable novel, On the Road.

== Packaging ==
The front cover of Readings by Jack Kerouac on the Beat Generation originally featured a photograph of Kerouac by photographer Robert Frank, with liner notes on the rear by American disc jockey and album producer Bill Randle. This cover artwork was retained for the first CD reissue of the album on Rhino Records in 1990 and has also been used for some later vinyl editions.

A remastered CD was released in 1997, with new cover art that featured a photograph of Kerouac tuning a radio, taken by photographer and musician John Cohen. Other photographs by Robert Frank were featured elsewhere on the remastered album's packaging. The remastered edition also included liner notes on illustrated postcards by Kerouac's close friend and fellow Beat writer Allen Ginsberg.

== Release ==
Readings by Jack Kerouac on the Beat Generation was released in January 1960 on Verve Records on LP. In June 1990, Rhino Entertainment reissued the album on CD as part of the box set The Jack Kerouac Collection, also featuring Poetry for the Beat Generation, Blues and Haikus and The Last Word. The CD reissue included a bonus track, "Is There a Beat Generation?", a live lecture by Kerouac to students of Hunter College in Manhattan, New York on November 6, 1958. A remastered CD version was issued on October 28, 1997 on Verve Records.

Upon its release, the album received minimal critical reception. Allmusic reviewer Bruce Eder has since called Readings by Jack Kerouac on the Beat Generation "a solo performance that transcends poetry and music" and added "it's literally spoken jazz [...] Kerouac's most musical performance [...] using his voice and language the way a saxophonist might improvise on a particular melodic line or riff. He's spellbinding throughout, intense, focused, and even subtly changing voices with the work itself." Eder awarded the album a full five-star rating. The album was later nominated for the 1999 Grammy Award for Best Recording Package.

== Track listing ==
All tracks are written by Jack Kerouac.

No.	Title	Length
1.	"San Francisco Scene (The Beat Generation)"	3:09
2.	"San Francisco Blues (Fragments)"; I. "San Francisco"; II. "Street Scene"; III. "Money Honey"; IV. "Westinghouse Elevators"; V. "Old Age"; VI. "Praised Be Man"; VII. "The Sad Turtle"	3:02
3.	"Lucien Midnight: The Sounds of the Universe in My Window"; I. "Excerpt 1"; II. "Excerpt 2"	4:22
4.	"History of Bop"	10:53
5.	"The Subterraneans"	3:07
6.	"Visions of Neal: Neal and the Three Stooges"; I. "Part 1"; II. "Part 2"	16:59
Total length:		41:32

1990 CD reissue bonus track
No.	Title	Length
7.	"Is There a Beat Generation?"	12:34
Total length:		54:06

== Personnel ==
All personnel credits adapted from the album's liner notes.

Performer

- Jack Kerouac – voice

Technical personnel

- Bill Randle – producer
- Fred W. Meyer – mastering
- Richard Seidel – executive producer^{[A]}
- Aric Lach Morrison – producer^{[A]}
- Robert Silverburg – assistant producer^{[A]}
- Michael Lang – supervisor^{[A]}
- Ben Young – technician^{[A]}

Design personnel

- Robert Frank – photography
- John Cohen – photography
- Bill Randle – liner notes (original release)
- Allen Ginsberg – photography, liner notes (1997 CD reissue only)
- Randy Hutton – liner notes
- Peter Pullman – liner notes editor^{[A]}
- Chika Azuma – art direction, design^{[A]}
- Nichell Delvaille – design^{[A]}

== Notes ==
- A Denotes personnel on the 1990 CD reissue.
