= No Problem (Al Cohn album) =

Studio album by Al Cohn
- Released: 1980
- Recorded: December 18, 1979
- Studio: New York City
- Genre: Jazz
- Label: Xanadu; 179
- Producer: Don Schlitten

Al Cohn chronology
Heavy Love (1977)	No Problem (1980)	Xanadu in Africa (1980)

No Problem is an album by saxophonist Al Cohn recorded in 1979 for Xanadu Records.

== Reception ==
Professional ratings
Review scores
Source	Rating
Allmusic	4/5 stars

Allmusic awarded the album 4 stars with its review by Scott Yanow stating "Tenor saxophonist's Al Cohn's Xanadu albums of 1975–80 found him at the peak of his powers. ... Recommended, as are all of Cohn's swinging and boppish Xanadu dates".

== Track listing ==
1. "Fred" (Neal Hefti) – 6:33
2. "Danielle" (Al Cohn) – 6:52
3. "All the Things You Are" (Jerome Kern, Oscar Hammerstein II) – 6:49
4. "Zootcase" (Zoot Sims) – 4:49
5. "Sophisticated Lady" (Duke Ellington, Irving Mills, Mitchell Parish) – 5:17
6. "Mood Indigo" (Ellington, Barney Bigard, Mills) – 5:57
7. "Three Little Words" (Harry Ruby, Bert Kalmar) – 6:09

== Personnel ==
- Al Cohn – tenor saxophone
- Barry Harris – piano
- Steve Gilmore – bass
- Walter Bolden – drums
