= Either Way (album) =

Studio album by Zoot Sims and Al Cohn
- Released: 1961
- Recorded: February 1961
- Studio: Philadelphia, PA
- Genre: Jazz
- Length: 34:08
- Label: Fred Miles Presents; FM 1
- Producer: Fred Miles

Al Cohn chronology
Son of Drum Suite (1960)	Either Way (1961)	Jazz Mission to Moscow (1962)

Zoot Sims chronology
Down Home (1960)	Either Way (1961)	Zoot at Ronnie Scott's (1961)

Either Way is an album by Zoot Sims and Al Cohn recorded in Philadelphia in 1961 for the Fred Miles Presents label.

== Reception ==
Professional ratings
Review scores
Source	Rating
Allmusic	4/5 stars
The Penguin Guide to Jazz Recordings	3/4 stars

The Allmusic review by Scott Yanow stated "It is fun to hear Sims and Cohn work with a vocalist, jamming behind him and launching into their solos. The five instrumentals, which include the riffing "P-Town," the only ballad of the date ("Autumn Leaves") and the heated blues "Morning Fun," are excellent too, making this a set well worth picking up".

== Track listing ==
1. "P-Town" (Al Cohn) – 5:12
2. "I Like It Like That" (Max Collie) – 2:26
3. "Sweet Lorraine" (Cliff Burwell, Mitchell Parish) – 3:21
4. "Autumn Leaves" (Joseph Kosma, Johnny Mercer, Jacques Prévert) – 4:43
5. "The Thing" (Al Cooper) – 4:55
6. "I'm Tellin' Ya" (Cohn) – 4:47
7. "Nagasaki" (Mort Dixon, Harry Warren) – 2:29
8. "Morning Fun" (Cohn, Zoot Sims) – 6:15

== Personnel ==
- Zoot Sims, Al Cohn – tenor saxophone
- "Old Grand Happy" (Mose Allison) – piano
- Bill Crow – bass
- Gus Johnson – drums
- Cecil "Kid Haffey" Collier – vocals (tracks 2, 3 & 7)
