= The Modern Art of Jazz =

The Modern Art of Jazz may refer to:

- The Modern Art of Jazz by Zoot Sims (Dawn, 1956)
- The Modern Art of Jazz by Randy Weston (Dawn, 1956)
