= The Sax Section =

Studio album by Al Cohn
- Released: 1956
- Recorded: May 24 and June 5 & 28, 1956; New York City
- Genre: Jazz
- Length: 38:43
- Label: Epic; LN 3278

Al Cohn chronology
From A to...Z (1956)	The Sax Section (1956)	Cohn on the Saxophone (1956)

The Sax Section (subtitled The Jazz Workshop Under the Direction of Al Cohn) is an album by saxophonist composer and arranger Al Cohn recorded in 1956 for the Epic label.

== Reception ==
Professional ratings
Review scores
Source	Rating
AllMusic	4/5 stars
Disc	4/5 stars

The AllMusic review by Ken Dryden states, "Al Cohn's writing for small groups is always appealing, and this Epic LP is no exception. Leading three separate groups consisting of various reeds (and no brass) plus a rhythm section, Cohn obtains marvelous results from his groups of all-stars and veteran session musicians".

== Track listing ==
All compositions by Al Cohn except as indicated

1. "Shazam" - 2:55
2. "The Mellow Side" - 2:36
3. "Shutout" - 2:44
4. "Double Fracture" - 2:48
5. "While My Lady Sleeps" (Bronisław Kaper, Gus Kahn) - 3:15
6. "Shorty George" (Count Basie, Andy Gibson) - 2:50
7. "The Return of the Red Head" - 3:29
8. "Villa Rowboats" - 2:23
9. "Solsville" - 3:24
10. "Don't Worry 'bout Me" (Rube Bloom, Ted Koehler) - 3:39
11. "Blues for the High Brow" - 3:54
12. "Tears by Me Out the Heart" - 4:28

== Personnel ==
- Al Cohn - tenor saxophone, arranger
- Romeo Penque - clarinet, alto saxophone, oboe, English horn (tracks 3, 5, 8 & 10)
- Phil Bodner - flute, clarinet (tracks 3, 5, 8 & 10)
- Peanuts Hucko - clarinet (tracks 3, 5, 8 & 10)
- Boomie Richman - bass clarinet (tracks 3, 5, 8 & 10)
- Charlie O’Kane - flute, bass clarinet (tracks 3, 5, 8 & 10)
- Sam Marowitz, Gene Quill - alto saxophone (tracks 1, 4, 9 & 12)
- Zoot Sims (tracks 2, 6, 7 & 11), Eddie Wasserman (tracks 1, 2, 4, 6, 7, 9, 11 & 12) - tenor saxophone
- Sol Schlinger - baritone saxophone (tracks 1, 2, 4, 5, 7, 9, 11 & 12)
- Hank Jones (tracks 2, 6, 7 & 11), Johnny Williams (tracks 1, 3–5, 8–10 & 12) - piano
- Milt Hinton - bass
- Don Lamond (tracks 2, 3, 5–8, 10 & 11), Osie Johnson (tracks 1, 4, 9 & 12) - drums
