= Jazz Alive! A Night at the Half Note =

Live album by Zoot Sims, Al Cohn & Phil Woods
- Released: 1959
- Recorded: February 6 & 7, 1959; Half Note, NYC
- Genre: Jazz
- Length: 39:49
- Label: United Artists UAL 4040/UAS 5040
- Producer: Jack Lewis

Zoot Sims chronology
Stretching Out (1958)	Jazz Alive! A Night at the Half Note (1959)	A Gasser! (1959)

Al Cohn chronology
Al and Zoot (1957)	Jazz Alive! A Night at the Half Note (1959)	You 'n' Me (1960)

Phil Woods chronology
Early Quintets (1959)	Jazz Alive! A Night at the Half Note (1959)	Rights of Swing (1961)

Jazz Alive! A Night at the Half Note is a live album by saxophonists Zoot Sims, Al Cohn and Phil Woods recorded at the Half Note Club in 1959 and originally released on the United Artists label.

== Reception ==
Professional ratings
Review scores
Source	Rating
AllMusic	4.5/5 stars

Ken Dryden of AllMusic wrote in his review: "Bop and cool fans will want to make any effort to hear this excellent release".

== Track listing ==
1. "Lover, Come Back to Me" (Sigmund Romberg, Oscar Hammerstein II) - 9:08
2. "It Had to Be You" (Isham Jones, Gus Kahn) - 10:14
3. "Wee Dot" (J. J. Johnson) - 8:50
4. "After You've Gone" (Turner Layton, Henry Creamer) - 11:37
- Recorded at the Half Note in NYC on February 6, 1959 (tracks 1 & 2) and February 7, 1959 (tracks 3 & 4)

== Personnel ==
- Zoot Sims, Al Cohn - tenor saxophone
- Phil Woods - alto saxophone (tracks 3 & 4)
- Mose Allison - piano
- Nabil "Knobby" Totah - bass
- Paul Motian - drums
