= Son of Drum Suite =

Studio album by Al Cohn and His Orchestra
- Released: 1961
- Recorded: August 24 & 26, 1960
- Studio: Webster Hall, New York City
- Genre: Jazz
- Length: 29:18
- Label: RCA Victor; LPM/LSP 2312
- Producer: Dom Cerulli, Jack Lewis

Al Cohn chronology
You 'n' Me (1960)	Son of Drum Suite (1961)	Either Way (1961)

Son of Drum Suite is an album by Al Cohn and His Orchestra recorded in 1960 for the RCA Victor label. The album is a sequel to Manny Albam and Ernie Wilkins, The Drum Suite (RCA Victor, 1956).

== Reception ==
Professional ratings
Review scores
Source	Rating
Allmusic	4/5 stars

The Allmusic review by Scott Yanow stated "The music on this LP (long overdue to be reissued on CD) holds one's interest throughout, with Al Cohn's writing being particularly inventive".

== Track listing ==
All compositions by Al Cohn.

1. "First Movement: Son of a Drum" – 4:25
2. "Second Movement: Brushmanship" – 5:03
3. "Third Movement: Dr. Skin and Mr. Hide" – 3:55
4. "Fourth Movement: Five Drums in Four-Four Time" – 5:19
5. "Fifth Movement: Drums Loco" – 4:54
6. "Sixth Movement: Drum Smoke" – 5:42

== Personnel ==
- Al Cohn – conductor
- Bernie Glow, Jimmy Maxwell, Clark Terry, Nick Travis – trumpet
- Urbie Green, Dick Hixson, Frank Rehak – trombone
- Bob Brookmeyer – valve trombone
- John Barrows, Jim Buffington – French horn
- Ed Caine, Gene Quill – alto saxophone
- Romeo Penque, Zoot Sims – tenor saxophone
- Sol Schlinger – baritone saxophone
- Hank Jones – piano
- Mundell Lowe – guitar
- Buddy Clark, George Duvivier – bass
- Jimmy Cobb, Louis Hayes (tracks 1–3), Gus Johnson (tracks 4–6), Don Lamond, Mel Lewis, Charlie Persip – drums
