= Al and Zoot =

Studio album by Al Cohn Quintet Featuring Zoot Sims
- Released: 1957
- Recorded: March 27, 1957; New York City
- Genre: Jazz
- Length: 47:00 CD reissue with bonus track
- Label: Coral; CRL 57171
- Producer: Steve Backer

Al Cohn chronology
The Four Brothers... Together Again! (1957)	Al and Zoot (1957)	Jazz Alive! A Night at the Half Note (1959)

Zoot Sims chronology
The Four Brothers... Together Again! (1957)	Al and Zoot (1957)	Locking Horns (1957)

Al and Zoot is an album by the Al Cohn Quintet featuring Zoot Sims recorded in 1957 for the Coral label.

== Reception ==
Professional ratings
Review scores
Source	Rating
AllMusic	3/5 stars

The AllMusic review by Scott Yanow states, "The mid- to late '50s were a period of intense recording activity and this album is one of the underrated gems that was somewhat overlooked at the time".

== Track listing ==
All compositions by Al Cohn except as indicated

1. "It's a Wonderful World" (Harold Adamson, Jan Savitt, Johnny Watson) - 6:32
2. "Brandy and Beer" - 3:49
3. "Two Funky People" - 4:30
4. "Chasing the Blues" - 6:12
5. "Halley's Comet" - 4:10
6. "You're a Lucky Guy" (Saul Chaplin, Sammy Cahn) - 3:39
7. "The Wailing Boat" - 6:18
8. "Just You, Just Me" (Jesse Greer, Raymond Klages) - 5:33
9. "Gone with the Wind" (Herbert Magidson, Allie Wrubel) - 6:17 Bonus track on CD reissue

== Personnel ==
- Al Cohn - tenor saxophone
- Zoot Sims - tenor saxophone, clarinet on 3
- Mose Allison - piano
- Teddy Kotick - bass
- Nick Stabulas - drums
