= Play It Now =

Studio album by Al Cohn
- Released: 1975
- Recorded: June 19, 1975; New York City
- Genre: Jazz
- Label: Xanadu; 110
- Producer: Don Schlitten

Al Cohn chronology
Motoring Along (1974)	Play It Now (1975)	True Blue (1976)

Play It Now is an album by saxophonist Al Cohn which was recorded in 1975 and released on the Xanadu label.

== Reception ==
Professional ratings
Review scores
Source	Rating
Allmusic	3/5 stars
The Rolling Stone Jazz Record Guide	5/5 stars

The Allmusic review awarded the album 3 stars stating "Tenor saxophonist Al Cohn did some of his finest playing during his period (1975-80) with Xanadu".

== Track listing ==
1. "You're My Everything" (Mort Dixon, Harry Warren, Joe Young) - 6:06
2. "Lover" (Lorenz Hart, Richard Rodgers) - 9:47
3. "Play It Now" (Al Cohn) - 5:02
4. "Irrestible You" (Don Raye, Gene De Paul) - 6:36
5. "Georgia on My Mind" (Hoagy Carmichael, Stuart Gorrell) - 6:26
6. "It's Sand, Man!" (Ed Lewis) - 5:40

== Personnel ==
- Al Cohn - tenor saxophone
- Barry Harris - piano
- Larry Ridley - bass
- Alan Dawson - drums
