= Motoring Along =

Studio album by Al Cohn & Zoot Sims
- Released: 1975
- Recorded: November 25, 1974
- Studio: Stockholm, Sweden
- Genre: Jazz
- Label: Sonet; SNTF 684
- Producer: Rune Öfwerman

Al Cohn chronology
Body and Soul (1973)	Motoring Along (1975)	Play It Now (1975)

Zoot Sims chronology
Dave McKenna Quartet featuring Zoot Sims (1973)	Motoring Along (1974)	Basie & Zoot (1975)

Motoring Along is an album by Al Cohn and Zoot Sims recorded in Sweden in 1974 for the Sonet label.

== Reception ==
Professional ratings
Review scores
Source	Rating
Allmusic	3/5 stars
The Penguin Guide to Jazz Recordings	3/4 stars

The Allmusic review by Scott Yanow stated "As usual the two saxophonists mutually inspire each other on the cool-toned but frequently-heated bop date".

== Track listing ==
1. "Stockholm – L.A." (Al Cohn) – 4:50
2. "My Funny Valentine" (Richard Rodgers, Lorenz Hart) – 8:38
3. "Yardbird Suite" (Charlie Parker) – 7:57
4. "Motoring Along" (Jimmy McGriff) – 4:47
5. "Fallin'" (Cohn) – 7:04
6. "What the World Needs Now" (Burt Bacharach, Hal David) – 8:40

== Personnel ==
- Al Cohn – tenor saxophone
- Zoot Sims – tenor saxophone, soprano saxophone
- Horace Parlan – piano
- Hugo Rasmussen – bass
- Sven Erik Norregaard – drums
