= Heavy Love (Al Cohn and Jimmy Rowles album) =

Studio album by Al Cohn and Jimmy Rowles
- Released: 1977
- Recorded: March 15, 1977
- Studio: New York City
- Genre: Jazz
- Length: 47:46
- Label: Xanadu; 145
- Producer: Don Schlitten

Jimmy Rowles chronology
| Music's the Only Thing That's on My Mind (1976) | Heavy Love (1977) | Isfahan (1978) |

Al Cohn chronology
| Al Cohn's America (1976) | Heavy Love (1977) | No Problem (1978) |

Heavy Love is an album by saxophonist Al Cohn and pianist Jimmy Rowles, recorded in 1977 for Xanadu Records.

== Reception ==
Professional ratings
Review scores
| Source | Rating |
|---|---|
| Allmusic | 4/5 stars |
| The Observer | 5/5 stars |

Allmusic awarded the album 4 stars with its review by Scott Yanow stating "the momentum and excitement of this encounter never slows down. Cohn and Rowles' swing-oriented styles, wit and ability to come up with fresh ideas on older songs are quite complementary; they continually bring out the best in each other. This highly recommended set is a real gem, a highpoint in both of the musicians' long careers". In The Observer Dave Gelly wrote "this is a beauty. Recorded in 1977 by a pair of battle-hardened jazz veterans, it’s full of wit, musical sleight of hand and the kind of tough lyricism that grabs you by the ear and won’t let go. ... What they do with six venerable standards and a blues speaks for the dedication and resilience of their whole generation"

== Track listing ==
1. "Them There Eyes" (Maceo Pinkard, Doris Tauber, William Tracey) – 6:31
2. "Sweet and Lovely" (Gus Arnheim, Jules LeMare, Harry Tobias) – 6:54
3. "I Hadn't Anyone Till You" (Ray Noble) – 6:54
4. "Taking a Chance on Love" (Vernon Duke, John La Touche, Ted Fetter) – 7:07
5. "These Foolish Things" (Eric Maschwitz, Jack Strachey) – 8:08
6. "Bar Talk" (Al Cohn, Jimmy Rowles) – 5:52
7. "For All We Know" (J. Fred Coots, Sam M. Lewis) – 6:20 Bonus track on CD reissue

== Personnel ==
- Al Cohn – tenor saxophone
- Jimmy Rowles – piano
