= Al Cohn's America =

Studio album by Al Cohn
- Released: 1976
- Genre: Jazz
- Label: Xanadu
- Producer: Don Schlitten

Al Cohn chronology
Silver Blue (1976)	Al Cohn's America (1976)	Heavy Love (1977)

Al Cohn's America is a jazz album by saxophonist Al Cohn, recorded in 1976 for Xanadu Records.

== Reception ==
The Allmusic review by Scott Yanow stated "Al Cohn's series of albums for Xanadu were among the happiest and most exciting of his career. Freed of his usual writing duties, Cohn sounds exuberant jamming through seven songs".

Professional ratings
Review scores
Source	Rating
Allmusic	4/5 stars
The Rolling Stone Jazz Record Guide	5/5 stars

== Track listing ==
1. "America the Beautiful" (Katherine Lee Bates, Samuel A. Ward) - 5:04
2. "Night and Day" (Cole Porter) - 8:34
3. "My Shining Hour" (Harold Arlen, Johnny Mercer) - 8:33
4. "Bright" (Al Cohn) - 5:09
5. "Skylark" (Hoagy Carmichael, Johnny Mercer) - 6:18
6. "Woody'n You" (Dizzy Gillespie) - 5:54
7. "Comin' Home" (Franz Jackson) - 6:06

== Personnel ==
- Al Cohn – sax
- Barry Harris – piano
- Sam Jones – Double Bass
- Leroy Williams – drums
