= From A to... Z =

Studio album by The Al Cohn / Zoot Sims Sextet
- Released: 1957
- Recorded: January 23–24, 1956
- Venues: Webster Hall, New York City
- Genre: Jazz
- Length: 55:47 CD reissue with bonus tracks
- Labels: RCA Victor; LPM 1282
- Producer: Ed Michel

Al Cohn chronology
The Brothers! (1955)	From A to... Z (1957)	The Sax Section (1956)

Zoot Sims chronology
The Modern Art of Jazz by Zoot Sims (1956)	From A to... Z (1956)	Tonite's Music Today (1956)

From A to... Z is a studio album by the Al Cohn / Zoot Sims Sextet recorded in early 1956 for RCA Victor.

== Reception ==
Professional ratings
Review scores
Source	Rating
AllMusic	3/5 stars

The AllMusic review by Scott Yanow stated, "Al and Zoot avoid obvious material ('Somebody Loves Me' and 'East of the Sun' are the only standards) in favor of swinging 'modern' originals."

== Track listing ==
1. "Mediolistic" (Osie Johnson) – 3:29
2. "Crimea River" (Ralph Burns) – 3:08
3. "A New Moan" (Manny Albam) – 3:52
4. "A Moment's Notice" (Ernie Wilkins) – 3:19
5. "My Blues" (Al Cohn) – 3:14
6. "Sandy's Swing" (Milt Gold) – 3:23
7. "Somebody Loves Me" (George Gershwin, Buddy DeSylva, Ballard MacDonald) – 2:51
8. "More Bread" (Wilkins) – 3:05
9. "Sherm's Terms" (Dick Sherman) – 2:57
10. "From A to Z" (Cohn) – 2:57
11. "East of the Sun (and West of the Moon)" (Brooks Bowman) – 4:19
12. "Tenor for Two Please, Jack" (Zoot Sims) – 4:25
13. "My Blues" [Alternate take] (Cohn) – 4:17; Bonus track on CD reissue
14. "More Bread" [Alternate take] (Wilkins) – 3:09; Bonus track on CD reissue
15. "Tenor for Two Please, Jack" [Alternate take] (Sims) – 4:17; Bonus track on CD reissue
16. "Somebody Loves Me" [Alternate take] (Gershwin, DeSylva, MacDonald) – 3:05; Bonus track on CD reissue
- Recorded at Webster Hall in New York City on January 23, 1956 (tracks 1–3) and January 24, 1956 (tracks 4–16)

== Personnel ==
- Al Cohn, Zoot Sims – tenor saxophone
- Dick Sherman – trumpet
- Hank Jones (tracks 7, 10–12, 15 & 16), Dave McKenna (tracks 1–6, 8, 9, 13 & 14) – piano
- Milt Hinton – bass
- Osie Johnson – drums
