= Tuba Skinny =

Traditional jazz band based in New Orleans

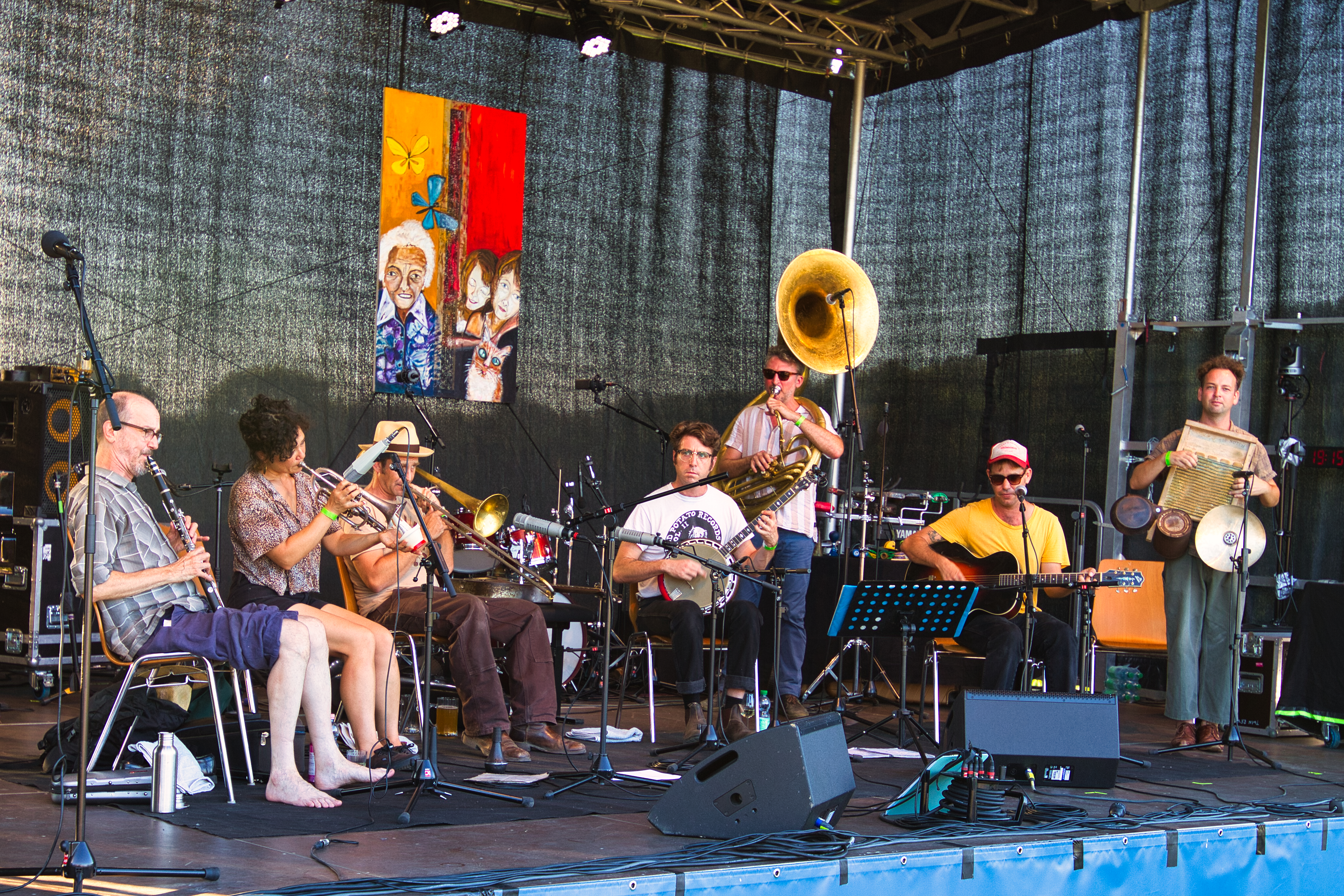
- Tuba Skinny performing in 2022

Background information
- Origin: New Orleans, Louisiana, United States
- Genres: Jazz; ragtime; swing; blues
- Years active: 2009–present
- Members: Shaye Cohn (Note: Shaye Cohn grew up in Brookline, Massachusetts, where she spent 12 years practicing classical piano and earned several awards. She studied music at New York University. Tiring of the "lonely, stressful lifestyle," she assumed she would never play another instrument again.); Barnabus Jones; Todd Burdick; Craig Flory; Gregory Sherman; Max Bien-Kahn; Jason Lawrence; Robin Rapuzzi; Erika Lewis (Note: Vocalist Erika Lewis previously played as a perennial member of the band but now performs less frequently due to job commitments. Nevertheless, the band's website notes that "she remains active in the band," and she often joins them for tours and festival gigs.)
- Website: tubaskinny.com

Tuba Skinny is an American street band based in New Orleans, Louisiana, known for their performances of early jazz, ragtime, and blues music of the 1920s and 1930s. In contrast to many pre-revival and revival traditional bands, the ensemble seeks to emulate the sound of jazz in the days before phonographs became widely available. The band's instrumentation includes cornet, clarinet, trombone, tuba, tenor banjo, guitar, frottoir, and vocals. As a busking band, the group has performed on city streets and at music festivals around the world, including Mexico, Sweden, Australia, Italy, France, Switzerland, and Spain.

Formed in 2009 after many years of its members playing in different New Orleans street bands, Tuba Skinny quickly gained a strong following on YouTube, where hundreds of fan-recorded videos attracted a substantial international viewership. Although the band does not maintain an official YouTube channel, its street performances are widely shared by fans. Critics have described the band's fan base as possessing a "lighthearted, fun, flapper vibe," a reflection of the early Jazz Age time period evoked by their music.

In the decade and a half since their formation, Tuba Skinny has grown in popularity, releasing more than a dozen albums, touring internationally, and attracting high-profile fans such as R. Crumb, Amanda Palmer, and Neil Gaiman. Their albums have garnered several awards, and publications such as OffBeat and The Syncopated Times rank them among the leading traditional jazz bands active today. Despite international acclaim and paid appearances at jazz festivals, Tuba Skinny continues to perform on the streets of New Orleans and elsewhere in order to maintain their close connection with audiences.

== History ==
=== Beginnings in street bands ===
"A lot of us came down here [to New Orleans] without the expectation that we would be doing what we're doing today, but we were all drawn to stay here because of the city's rich musical legacy. We're all transplants from different parts of the country, but we share a deep love and respect for this city."

— Shaye Cohn, OffBeat interview, 2018

The nucleus of Tuba Skinny began coalescing in the Crescent City circa 2003 to 2005, (Note: "I came [to New Orleans] around 2003 for the first time," Barnabus Jones recalled in a 2019 interview, "I fell in love with [the city]. I'm still there, so that says something, sixteen or seventeen years later.") just prior to the devastation and upheaval caused by Hurricane Katrina. Many of the band's musicians, such as Shaye Cohn, traveled to New Orleans to meet up with other itinerant musicians with whom they could play together, and they began performing together in various bands on the city streets.

None of the band is native to the city. Orchestrator and cornetist, Shaye Cohn, hails from Boston. She is the granddaughter of jazz saxophonist Al Cohn. Trombonist Barnabus Jones is a Virginian. Todd Burdick, the eponymous tuba of Tuba Skinny who also plays the banjo and guitar, is a Chicagoan. Guitarist Max Bien-Kahn is from San Francisco. Vocalist and bass drummer, Erika Lewis, is from New York's Hudson River Valley and resided in Tennessee. Clarinetist Craig Flory and frottoirist Robin Rapuzzi are both from Seattle.

==== Dead Man Street Orchestra ====
In late 2005, Todd Burdick, Shaye Cohn, Barnabus Jones, Kiowa Wells, Alynda Segarra, and other itinerant musicians who eventually comprised Tuba Skinny formed a busking band called the Dead Man Street Orchestra. They often played in the hurricane-ravaged streets of the city. Subsisting in modest circumstances, they "played for tips in Jackson Square out of necessity more than choice." At least one band member faced arrest for "bumming for money" while on Bourbon Street in the French Quarter and learned to play an instrument to stop begging for spare change.

During this period, Burdick played the banjo, Cohn played the accordion, Jones played the fiddle, and Kiowa Wells played the guitar. Alynda Segarra, the future band leader of Hurray for the Riff Raff, played the mini-washboard. Their tramp band played Cajun folk music, gypsy music, and Balkan melodies, as well as old-time mountain music in the style of the Avett Brothers, Uncle Earl, and Old Crow Medicine Show. A surviving 2005 recording of their Balkan melody interpretation of "You Are My Sunshine" exemplifies the band's inchoate style during this period.

"You Are My Sunshine" (2005)
An audio sample of the Dead Man Street Orchestra's Balkan melody interpretation of "You Are My Sunshine," a state song of Louisiana. Performers include: Shaye Cohn (accordion), Barnabus Jones (fiddle), Todd Burdick (banjo), Kiowa Wells (guitar), and Alynda Segarra (washboard)

At the time, publications described the band as a motley collection of New Orleans street people belonging to "a subculture of rail-riding, outdoor-living hobos." Its members were known to "sleep out in the open, look for food in trash cans, indulge themselves with excessive drinking and drugs and play great music." The band often undertook boxcar tours as far away as the East Coast and West Coast. In February 2007, a photo-essay by James Heil chronicling the hardscrabble perambulatory band titled "The Ballad of the Hobo" appeared in Time magazine.

While playing with the Dead Man Street Orchestra, the seeds for a brass band began to germinate in the minds of Cohn, Jones, and others. "We had this talk one day when we were with Dead Man Street Orchestra," recalled Barnabus Jones, "I remember Shaye said, 'Wouldn't it be great if one day we had a brass band?'" When the Dead Man Street Orchestra dissolved, Cohn, Jones, Burdick, Wells, Segarra, and other instrumentalists joined the Loose Marbles, another busking ensemble led by trumpeter Ben Polcer and clarinetist Michael Magro.

==== Loose Marbles ====
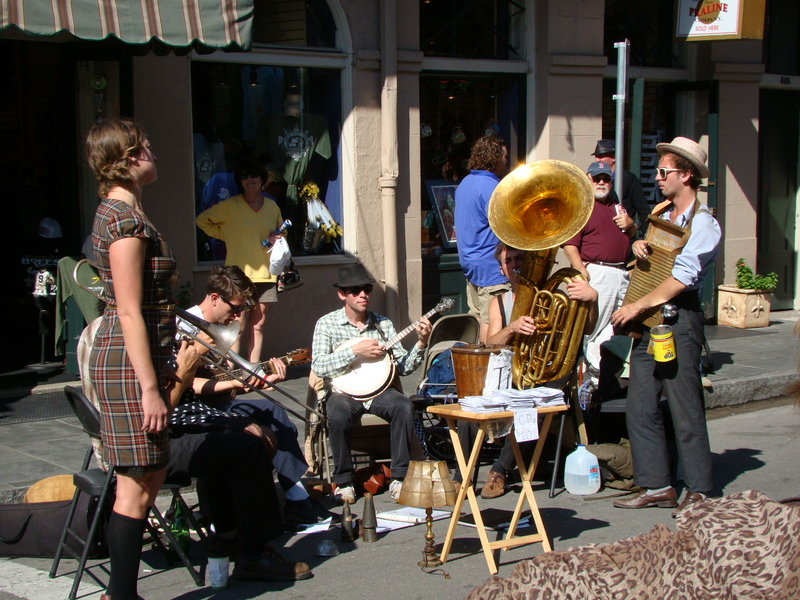
Several members of Tuba Skinny performing on the streets of New Orleans circa November 2009: Erika Lewis (far left), Gregory Sherman (banjo), and Todd Burdick (tuba). Barnabus Jones (trombone) and Shaye Cohn (cornet) are partly visible.

While performing with the Loose Marbles, (Note: Shaye Cohn, Barnabus Jones, Todd Burdick, and Robin Rapuzzi continued to perform with the Loose Marbles as late as 2015.) the future members of Tuba Skinny learned to play traditional jazz. Polcer and Magro's Loose Marbles operated like a dynamic jazz collective, forming smaller groups across the city to keep performances fresh and maximize earnings. With a rotating lineup of approximately fifteen musicians, the ensemble featured clarinet, trumpet, banjo, washboard, accordion, trombone and stand-up bass, although any given performance typically included seven players. The ever-changing impromptu line-up sometimes included Kiowa Wells on the guitar, Alynda Segarra on the banjo, Meschiya Lake and Tamar Korn singing vocals, and Marla Dixon on the trumpet.

Cohn initially played jazz piano with the Loose Marbles, reflecting her training as a classical pianist. After training for twelve years in classical piano, she "burned out" due to "many, many hours practicing in a tiny rehearsal room going over the same four measures again and again." One day in New Orleans, while residing in a dilapidated building strewn with an assortment of abandoned instruments, Cohn salvaged a flood-damaged "swamp trumpet" and became a devotee of the horn. "Barnabus [Jones] and I were trying to figure out scales on the trumpet together, and it was just so fun. I just got really hooked," Cohn recalled. "I had never played a wind instrument before and it just felt really powerful, so I got to play second trumpet with [the Loose Marbles], sometimes they'd invite me to play with them."

"Most everyone in [Tuba Skinny] went through a punk rock phase. I think punk had a lot to do with people who took up string band music or trad jazz music. In punk, DIY is very important. You're going to do everything yourself."

— Shaye Cohn, OffBeat interview, 2018

Todd Burdick, the band's tuba player, likewise began his musical journey on other instruments. He played punk rock and experimental music as a percussionist, and he learned to play the banjo, guitar, and other instruments by busking with the ensemble. "It was like learning from the ground up with them," Burdick stated. Over time, as various street musicians rolled in and out of the Loose Marbles, new ensembles formed, such as Alynda Segarra's Hurray for the Riff Raff, Meschiya Lake's Little Big Horns and—eventually—Tuba Skinny.

=== Formation and early years ===
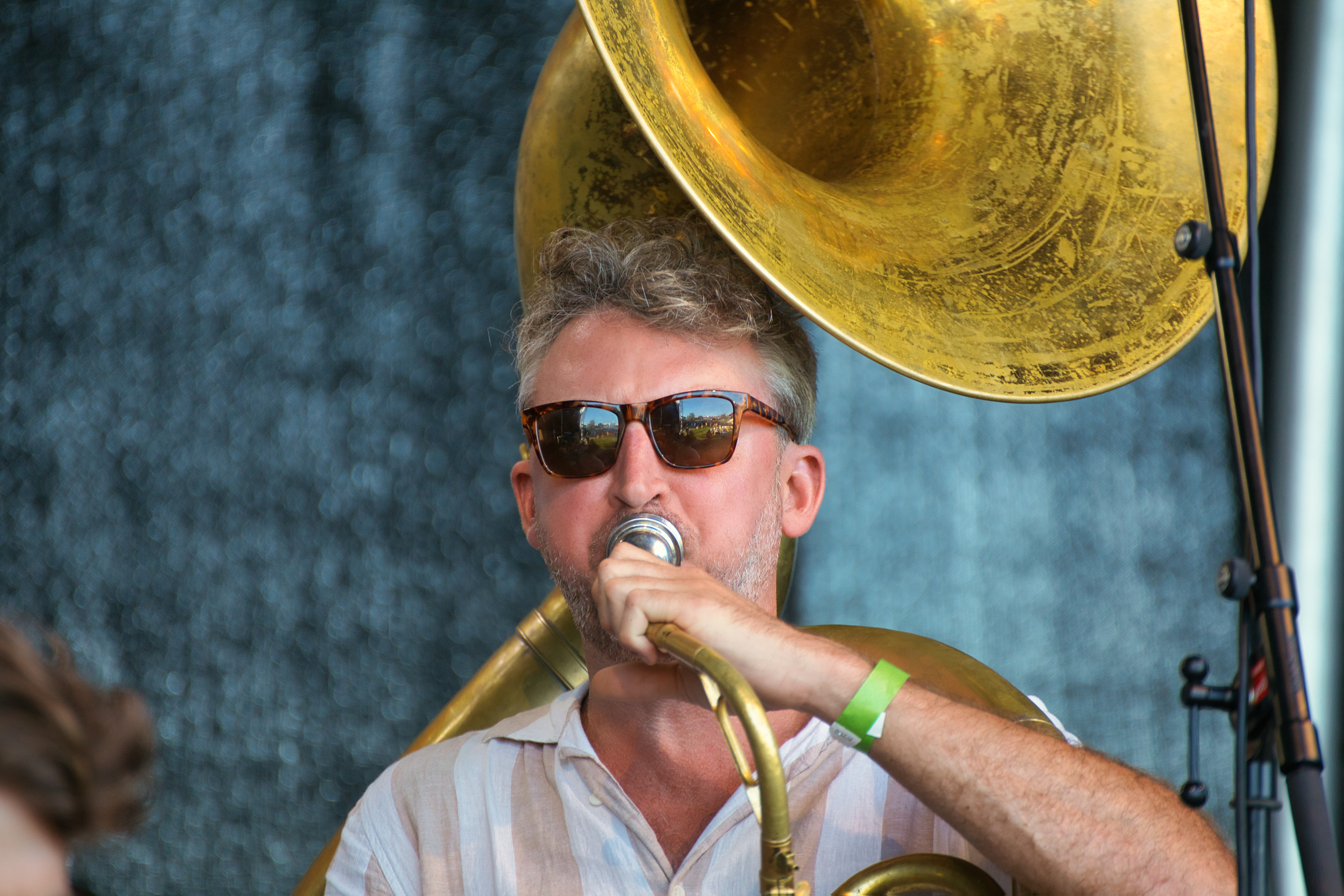
Todd Burdick
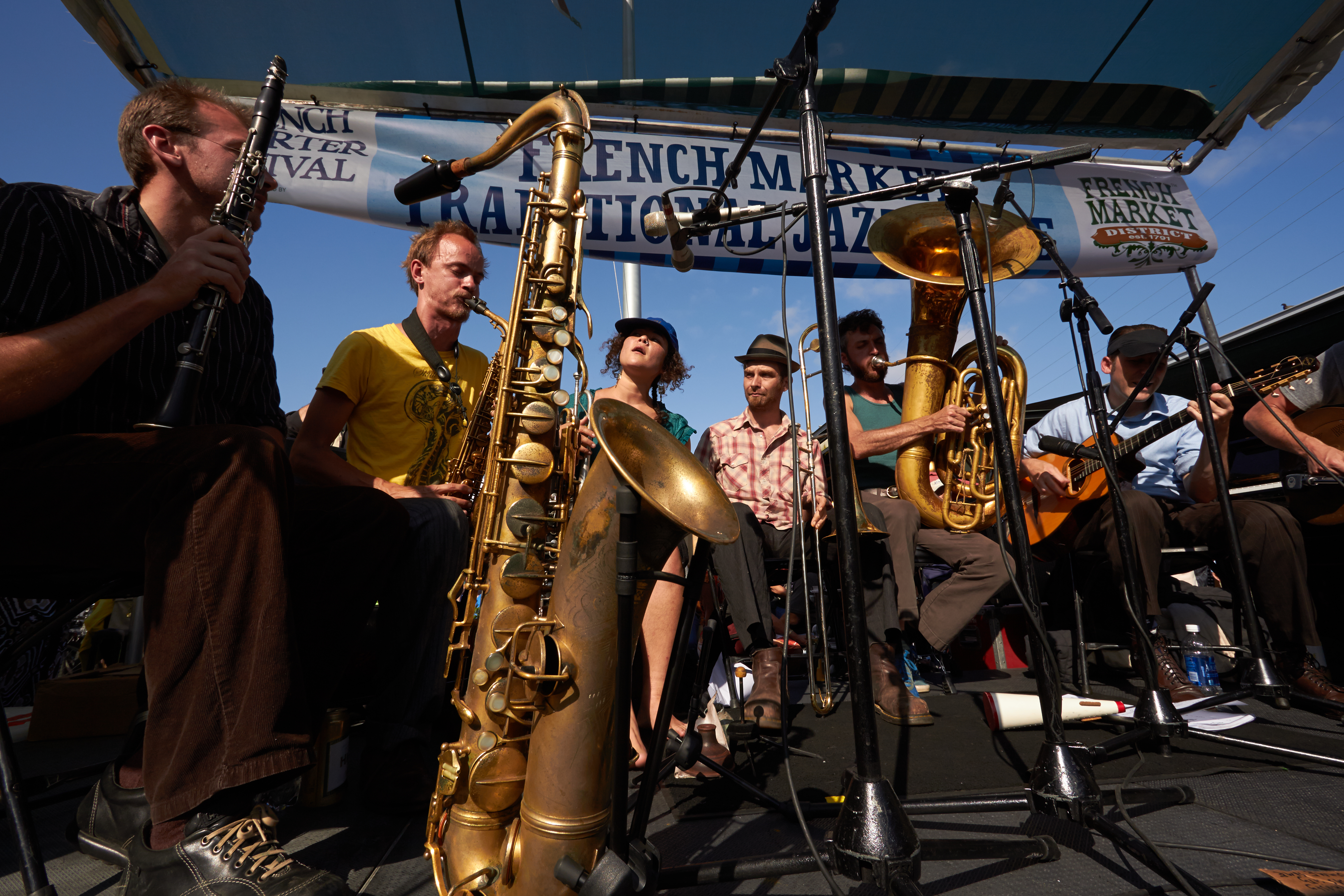
Barnabus Jones
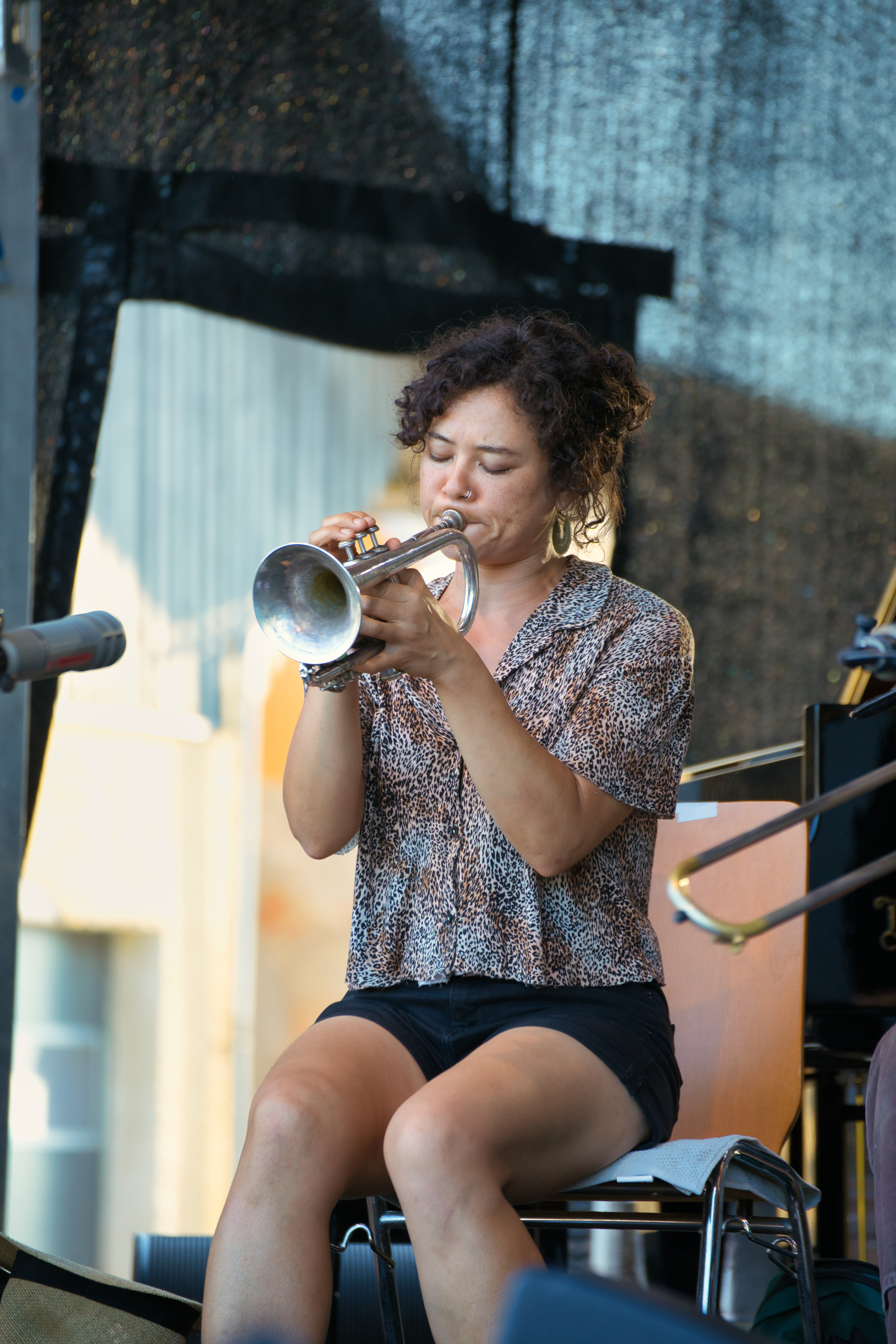
Shaye Cohn
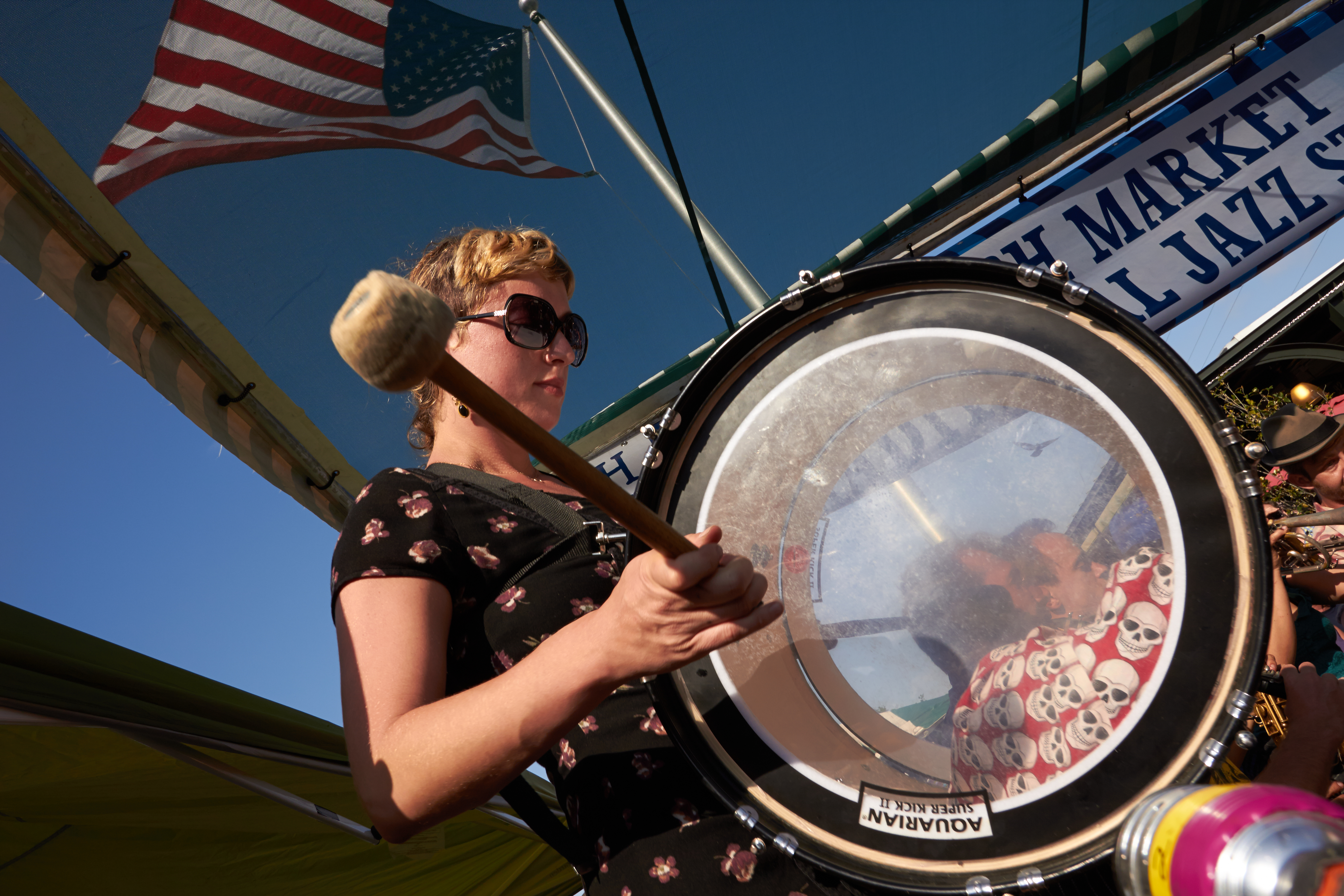
Erika Lewis

By 2009, Shaye Cohn, Barnabus Jones, Todd Burdick and Kiowa Wells frequently played hot jazz on Royal Street in the French Quarter of New Orleans while learning an assortment of various instruments. They chose hot jazz because they considered it to be the most accessible form of music. "People bump into you and say, 'What kind of music is that? I never heard that kind of jazz,'" Cohn explained, "which I can relate to because, at one point, I had never heard this kind of jazz either." As the drunken crowds and noisy bars of historic Bourbon Street made street performances almost impossible, Tuba Skinny instead performed on the quieter Royal Street with its antique shops and streetside cafes.

The band acquired their name by happenstance due to a sarcastic remark from a passerby. Whenever the band's slender sousaphone player, Todd Burdick, cycled with his instrument down a street in Faubourg Marigny, a random heckler shouted: "Hey, look, it's Tuba Skinny!" This sarcastic remark referenced Anthony "Tuba Fats" Lacen, a Jackson Square musician and local folk hero who fought for the rights of street musicians and died in 2004. Burdick recounted this recurrent event to his fellow bandmates, and the band decided to run with the name, christening themselves "Tuba Skinny." Other than the name, the band has no official ties to Tuba Fats nor did they name themselves in his honor.

Tuba Skinny soon became a popular ensemble in the traditional jazz haunts of New Orleans due to their historical fidelity to the raucous 1920s jazz, an era often overlooked in the city's music scene at the time. Unlike revival or pre-revival bands, they sought to imitate the sound of jazz in the days before phonographs became widely available. They initially drew upon the Loose Marbles' repertoire but, as time passed, they began resurrecting forgotten tunes. This included works by "Louis Armstrong's Hot 5 and Hot 7, Jelly Roll Morton's Red Hot Peppers, Bunk Johnson, George Lewis, Jim Robinson, the Mississippi Sheiks, Sam Morgan's Jazz Band, Johnny and Baby Dodds, Blind Blake, Blind Boy Fuller, the Memphis Jug Band, King Oliver, Bessie Smith" and others.

=== Early albums and tours ===
"Crow Jane" (2012)
An audio sample of Tuba Skinny's hot jazz interpretation of "Crow Jane," a blues song by American Delta artist Skip James.

The same year, the band recorded their first eponymous album Tuba Skinny (2009), followed by Six Feet Down (2010), Garbage Man (2011) and Rag Band (2012). Critics particularly praised on the band's interpretations of Skip James' "Crow Jane" and Hattie Hart's "Papa's Got Your Bath Water On". "Their take on rarely recorded songs such as the sly come-on 'Papa's Got Your Bath Water On' or Skip James' cold-blooded murder ballad 'Crow Jane' are poignant, yet fun," wrote David Kunian in OffBeat magazine. "Occasionally, the beat wanders or not everyone is in tune, but the general energy and joy of the music makes the listener forget such anomalies."

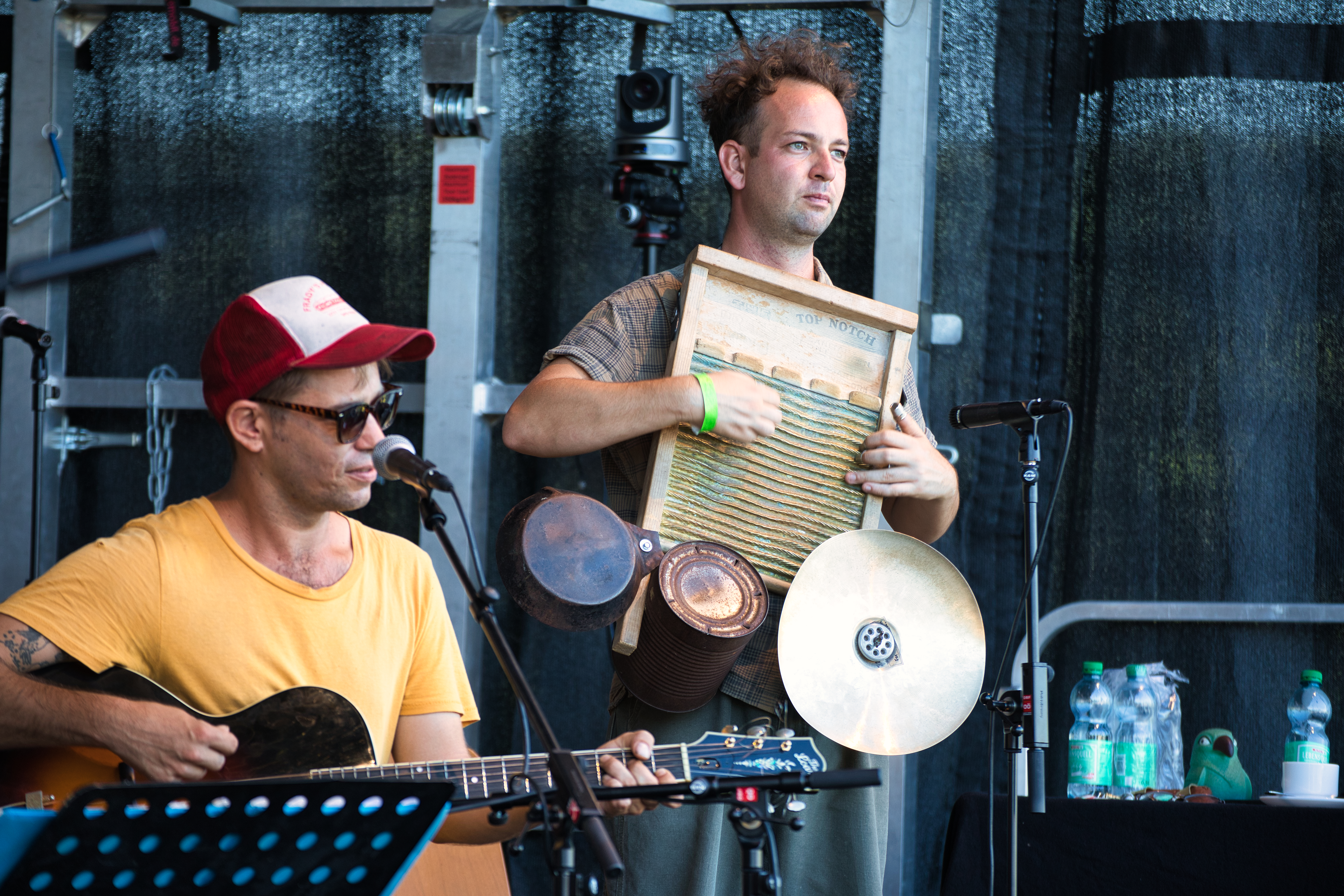
Frottoirist Robin Rapuzzi and guitarist Gregory Sherman

After recording their first, eponymous, album, the band began touring internationally in Summer 2009 when they flew to France. An acquaintance invited the band to the coastal town of Meschers-sur-Gironde, in the southwestern region of the country, where they played music in the streets and in taverns. They purchased used bicycles in Meschers and embarked on a cycling tour visiting the seaside towns along the southwest coast of France down to Spain. They camped overnight to reduce expenses.

While touring internationally, the band continued their busking tradition. They busked in Hobart, Tasmania, where they recorded their fifth album Pyramid Strut in 2013, and in old town centers throughout mainland Europe such as France, Italy, and Spain. Their least pleasant experience occurred while busking at a flea market in San Severo, Italy, where not a single passerby stopped to listen.

The band also busked across the United States. To do so, they squeezed their eight members, primary instruments, secondary instruments, and several pets—including Barnabus' pet dog Tupelo (Note: Trombonist Barnabus Jones composed the song "Tupelo Pine" for his now-deceased pet dog Tupelo. (Note: "Tupelo, Barnabus the trombone player's dog, eats leftover bacon.... Tupelo lays down to nap next to the tip jar in the center of the arc.... Tupelo has moved to sleep behind Greg's chair, tired of the spotlight.") The song became the title track of the band's 2017 album. Beloved by the band, Tupelo can be seen in many YouTube videos of the band's street performances.)—into a six-seat van.

"Everything seemed to happen so naturally with us. We really just wanted to keep playing together and were propelled by the energy of playing for crowds on the street."

— Erika Lewis, OffBeat magazine, 2018

Over the next several years, Tuba Skinny released further albums containing more than a hundred tracks, and several members released albums in other genres. In September 2016, Erika Lewis and Shaye Cohn released a country album Waiting For Stars for their other band, The Lonesome Doves. Described as "original country from Chattanooga by way of New Orleans," the album consisted entirely of songs composed by Lewis. On the album, both Cohn and Lewis sang vocals, with Lewis playing the guitar and Cohn playing the fiddle.

=== Circus act and acclaim ===
During the summer of 2018, the band performed five nights a week with the Ashton Brothers circus in the Netherlands. Their performances included Lewis' vocals accompanying trapeze acts and Cohn playing ragtime solos while clowns danced. When not performing with the circus, the band cycled into Utrecht and busked on the city streets. Although the circus invited them back the following year, the band declined due to their commitment to seeking out spontaneous new experiences. "We're jazz musicians and seek improvisation all the time," frottoirist Robin Rapuzzi explained, "We can't fix ourselves to the same set list of songs let alone the same acts and show routine for another season, all very untrue to the nature of our band."

In April 2019, the band released their tenth album Some Kind-a-Shake recorded at The Living Room Studio in New Orleans and featuring nine instrumentalists. In addition to traditional jazz and blues songs, the album featured two original compositions, "Some Kind-a-Shake" by Cohn, and "Berlin Rag" by clarinetist Ewan Bleach. The jazz-centric publication The Syncopated Times declared that the band's "tenth album, as unbelievable as this will sound, is their best." The publication observed that Tuba Skinny's "method is to rehearse on the street, fine tune in performance, and nail it in the studio." Critics praised the album's throwback emphasis on an ensemble sound rather than solos.

"It's important to every single person in the band that we keep playing on the street. If we stopped, something important about the band would be gone."

— Shaye Cohn, OffBeat interview, 2014

During the COVID-19 pandemic, the band's videos became popular among international viewers. In November 2020, The New York Times profiled an 89-year-old Holocaust survivor, Simon Gronowski, enduring the quarantine in Belgium. He mentioned his desire to play with the band. As an 11-year-old boy, Gronowski jumped off a death train headed to Auschwitz where his mother and sister perished. Seeking a hopeful outlook towards life, Gronowski embraced hot jazz as an art form that inspires happiness and brings people together. Several months later, the band arranged for a virtual collaboration with Gronowski accompanying them on piano.

In more recent years, the band garnered more official recognition. In 2022, the Jazz Foundation of America presented the band on a weekly basis at the New Orleans Jazz Museum. That same year, the ensemble won an Arhoolie Award, a citation given to American bands that "document, preserve, present, and disseminate authentic traditional and regional vernacular music." The Arhoolie Foundation cited the New Orleans-based band "as one of the most exciting traditional jazz groups playing today. Mixing well-known standards with original compositions and outstanding interpretations of rhythm and blues, Tuba Skinny has crowds moving wherever they play." Despite their international acclaim and paid appearances at jazz festivals, the band continues to perform on city streets worldwide in order to maintain their intimate connection with audiences.

== Repertoire ==
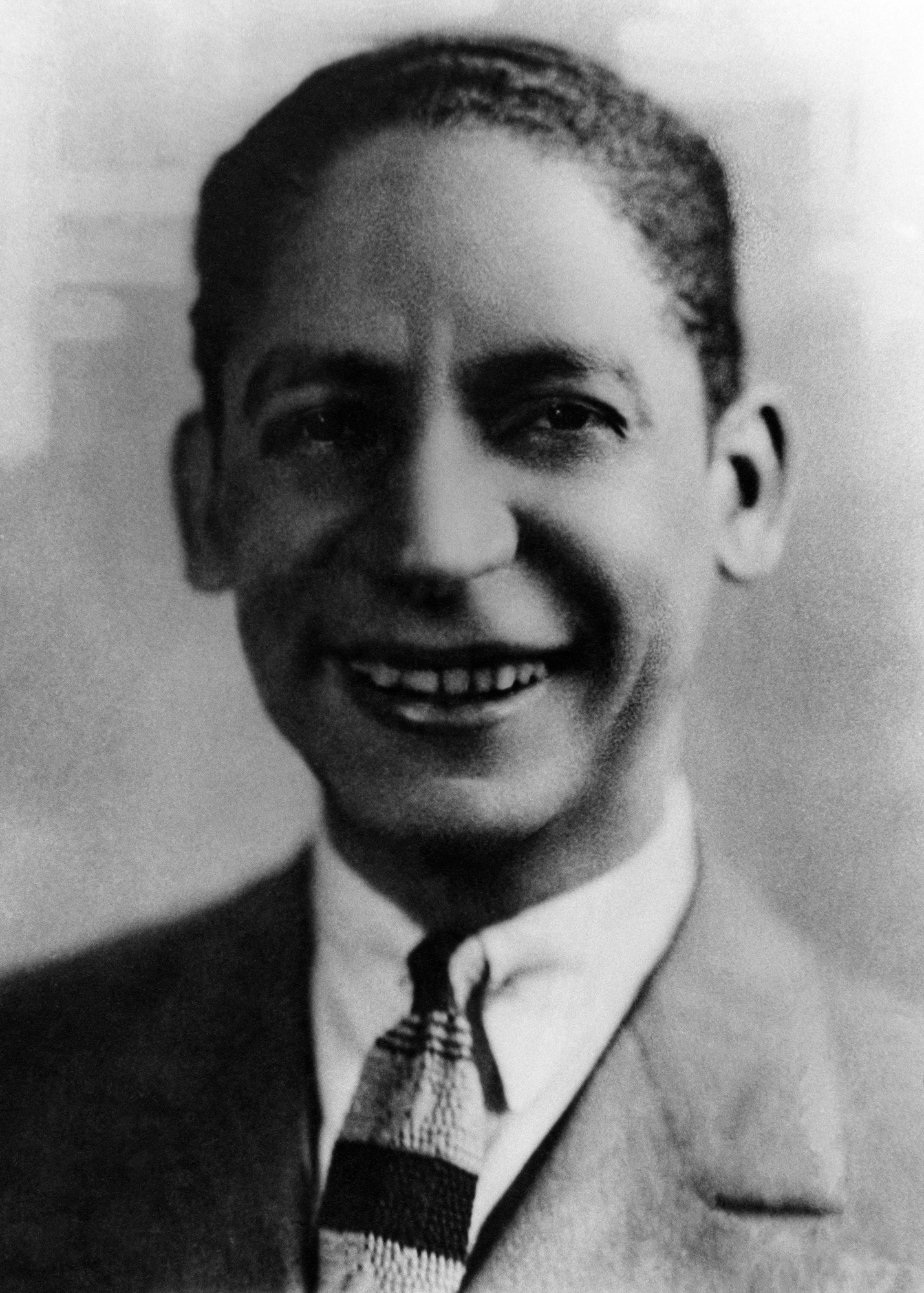
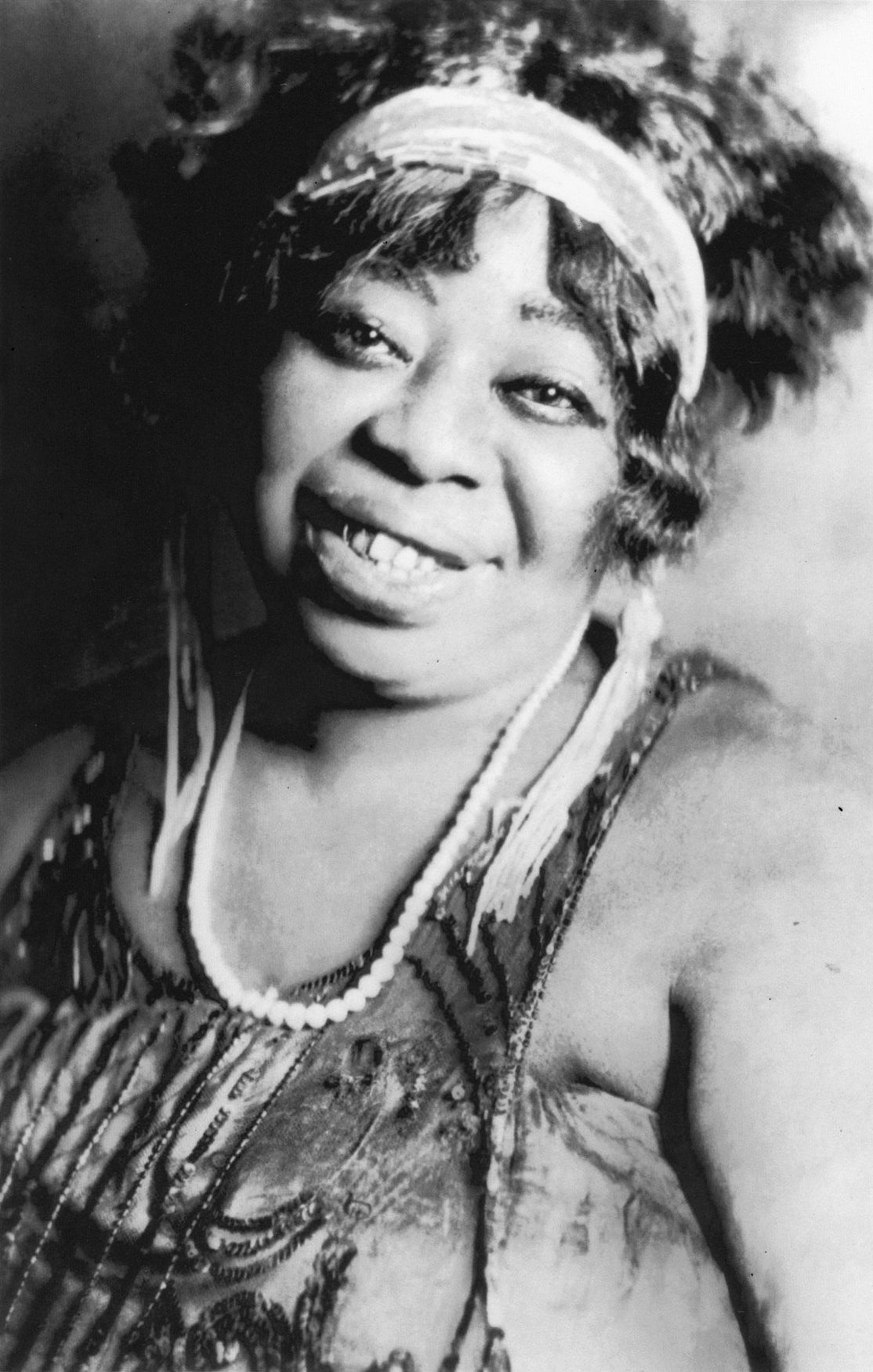
The band frequently covers jazz and blues songs by Jelly Roll Morton (left) and Ma Rainey (right).

Tuba Skinny draws its repertoire from lesser-known standards of the early Jazz Age as well as original compositions and new interpretations of rhythm and blues. Spanning over 400 songs, their repertoire's selection of deserving tunes has garnered praise, with the following songs deemed especially noteworthy: "New Orleans Bump," "Cushion Foot Stomp," "You Can Have My Husband," "Jackson Stomp," "Deep Henderson," "Banjoreno," "Treasures Untold," "Russian Rag," "Oriental Strut," "Minor Drag," "Michigander Blues," "In Harlem's Araby," "Me and My Chauffeur," "A Jazz Battle," "Droppin' Shucks," "Fourth Street Mess Around," and "Carpet Alley Breakdown."

The band's repertoire tends to favor singers and composers such as Victoria Spivey, Jelly Roll Morton, Lucille Bogan, Memphis Minnie, Jabbo Smith, Jimmie Rodgers, Georgia White, Skip James, Merline Johnson, Ma Rainey, Hattie Hart, Blind Blake and Clara Smith. Some of the bands whose material Tuba Skinny interpreted in its own manner are the Memphis Jug Band, the Dixieland Jug Blowers and the Mississippi Mud Steppers.

While hailed as outstanding performers of traditional jazz, Tuba Skinny have not restricted their selection of material to the traditional repertoire as they refuse to be circumscribed by rigid genres. Although the ensemble began playing predominantly early jazz, they transitioned over the years towards a more eclectic mix of string band music, jug band music, country blues, and ragtime. They briefly incorporated folk-country songs and New Orleans rhythm and blues into their performances before returning to their early jazz roots.

== Musical style ==
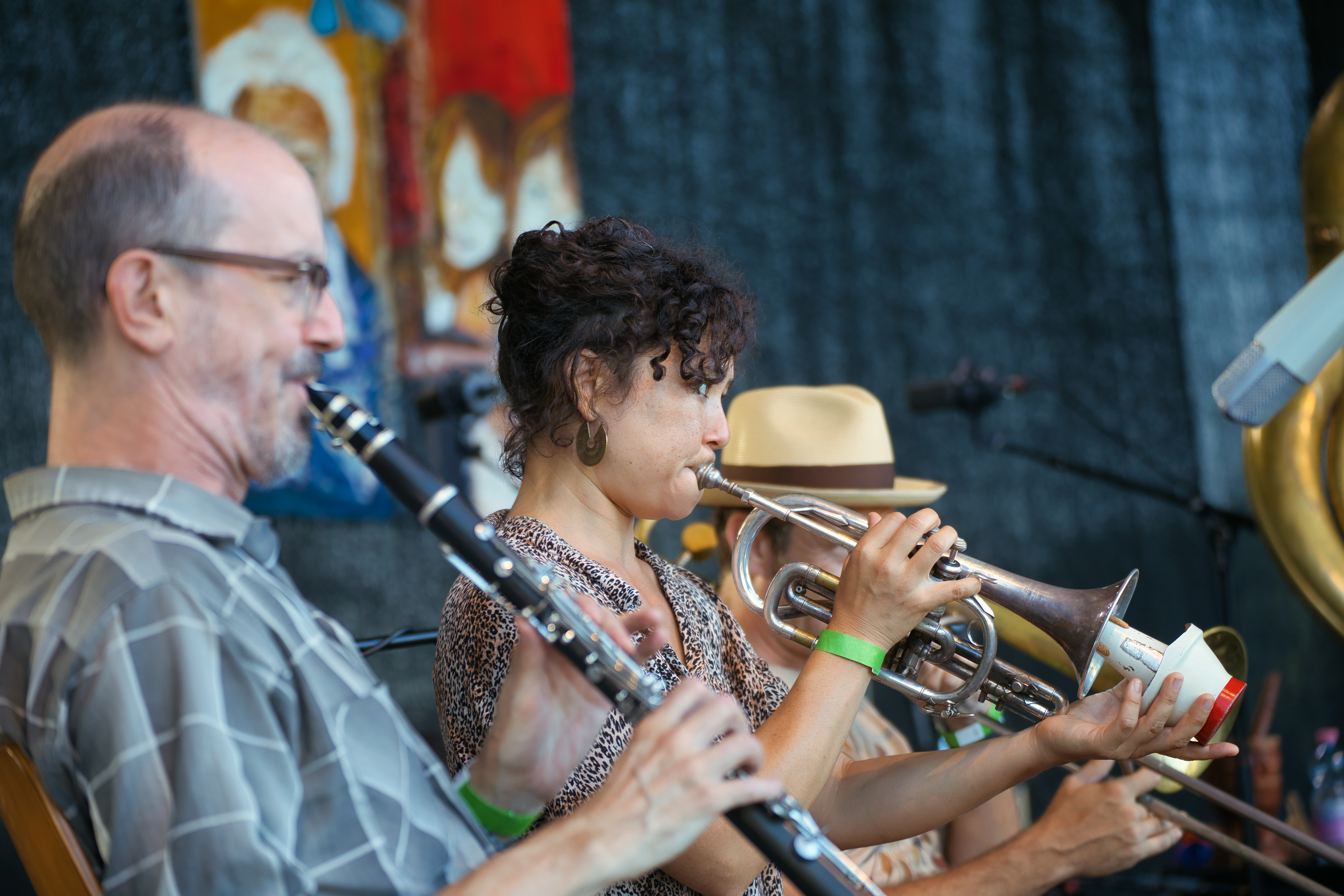
Craig Flory and Shaye Cohn

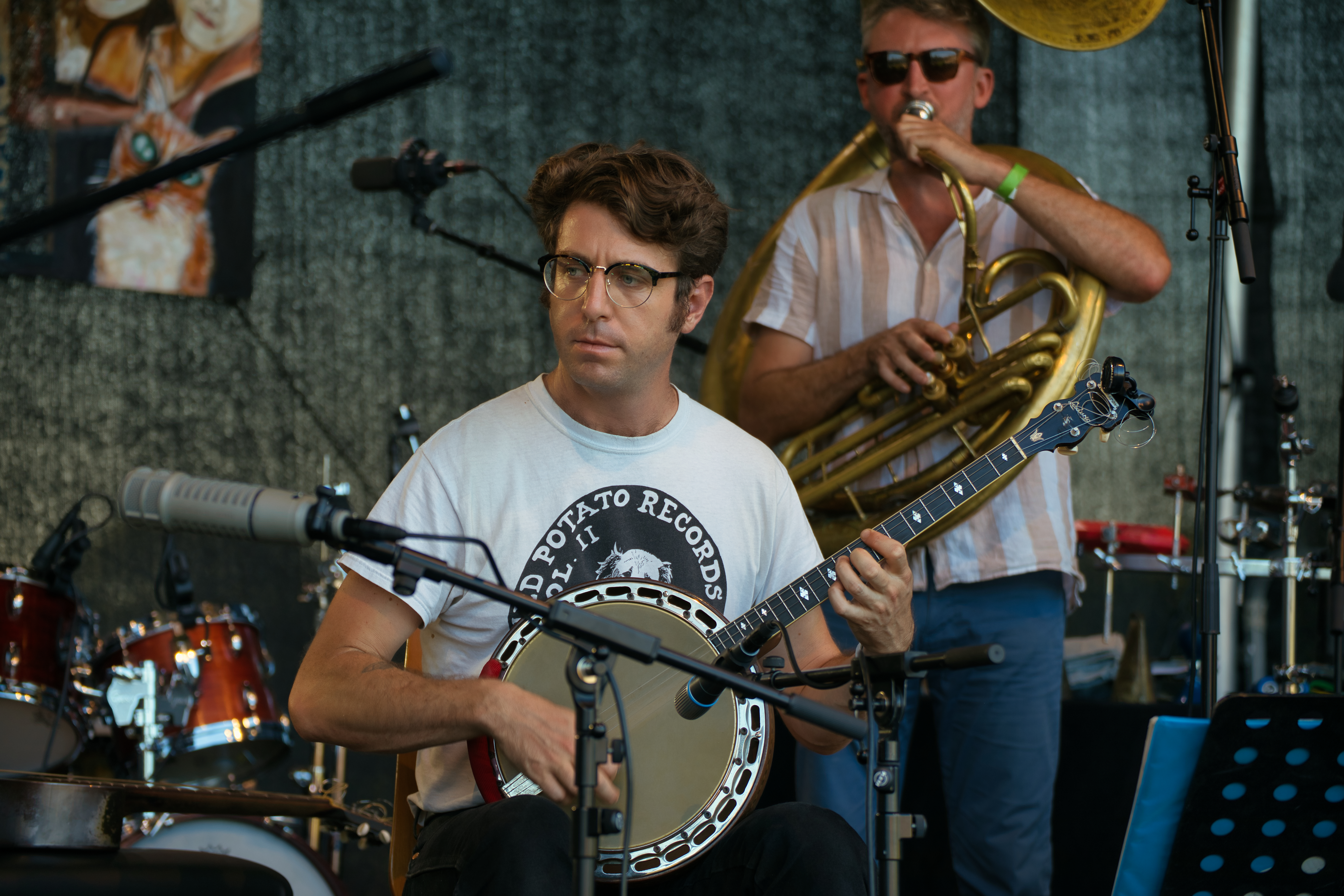
Max Bien-Kahn and Todd Burdick

Critics often praise the band's music for its originality and technical competence, as well as its looseness and spontaneity. In a 2014 review of their performance at the Melbourne Music Festival, critic Jessica Nicholas of The Sydney Morning Herald described the band's musical quality:

Musically, Tuba Skinny mines a rich seam of traditional jazz and blues from the '20s and '30s. And, while it's evident the band treasures the sense of history evoked by these vintage tunes, the players' natural exuberance makes the music feel irresistibly alive. Erika Lewis' vocals have a wonderfully earthy quality, her phrases often pulling behind the beat with a languid, world-weary drawl. On the instrumental numbers, Cohn's cornet outlined the melody and also engaged in spirited three-way conversations with Barnabus Jones' trombone and Jon Doyle's agile clarinet. Washboard player Robin Rapuzzi frolicked on the sidelines, his rhythmic explorations as captivating to watch as they were to listen to — even when the band was temporarily upstaged by a troupe of swing dancers, who launched into an athletic routine peppered with break-out solos and acrobatic air steps, offering a physical manifestation of the joy Tuba Skinny seem to bring with them wherever they go.

== Awards and honors ==
=== OffBeat's Best of The Beat Awards ===
Year	Category	Work nominated	Result	Ref.
2018	Best Traditional Jazz Album	Nigel's Dream	Won	
2019	Best Traditional Jazz Album	Some Kind-A-Shake	Won	
2021-22	Best Traditional Jazz Album	Let's Get Happy Together (with Maria Muldaur)	Won	
2023	Best Traditional Jazz Album	Hot Town	Won	

== Band members ==
Although the band's members have varied somewhat since their debut in 2009, the ensemble as of 2018 includes the following musicians.

- Shaye Cohn:
  - Cornet
  - Piano
  - Fiddle
  - Accordion
  - Banjo
  - Spoons
- Barnabus Jones:
  - Trombone
  - Banjo
  - Fiddle
  - Guitar
  - Vocals
- Todd Burdick:
  - Tuba
  - Sousaphone
- Craig Flory:
  - Clarinet
  - Saxophone
- Gregory Sherman:
  - Vocals
  - Guitar
  - Harmonica
- Max Bien-Kahn:
  - Resonator Guitar
  - Banjo
- Jason Lawrence:
  - Banjo
  - Guitar
- Robin Rapuzzi:
  - Washboard
  - Drum set
- Erika Lewis:
  - Vocals
  - Bass drum

Part-time members include:

- Jonathan Doyle:
  - Clarinet
  - Saxophone
- Ewan Bleach:
  - Clarinet
  - Saxophone

Former part-time members include:

- Kiowa Wells:
  - Guitar
- Alynda Segarra:
  - Banjo

== Discography ==
- Tuba Skinny (2009)
- Six Feet Down (2010)
- Garbage Man (2011)
- Rag Band (2012)
- Pyramid Strut (2014)
- Owl Call Blues (2014)
- Blue Chime Stomp (2016)
- Tupelo Pine (2017)
- Nigel's Dream (2018)
- Some Kind-a-Shake (2019)
- Quarantine Album: Unreleased B-Sides (2020)
- Mardi Gras EP (2021)
- Let's Get Happy Together (2021) (credited as "Maria Muldaur with Tuba Skinny")
- Magnolia Stroll (2022)
- Hot Town (2023)
- Live at d.b.a. (2026)

Tuba Skinny also appears in:

- Miss Fisher's Murder Mysteries: Music From the Second Series (2013)
- Alive and Kicking (2016 film) (performer: "Delta Bound")
- Hit Man (2023 film) (performer: "Jubilee Stomp")
