= The Four Brothers... Together Again! =

Studio album by Herbie Steward, Al Cohn, Zoot Sims and Serge Chaloff
- Released: 1957
- Recorded: February 11, 1957; Webster Hall, New York City
- Genre: Jazz
- Labels: Vik; LX 1096
- Producer: Bob Rolontz

Al Cohn chronology
| The Al Cohn Quintet Featuring Bobby Brookmeyer (1956) | The Four Brothers... Together Again! (1957) | Al and Zoot (1957) |

Zoot Sims chronology
| Zoot Sims Plays 4 Altos (1957) | The Four Brothers... Together Again! (1957) | Al and Zoot (1957) |

The Four Brothers... Together Again! is an album by the saxophonists Herbie Steward, Al Cohn, Zoot Sims and Serge Chaloff, who were collectively known as the Four Brothers, recorded in 1957 for the RCA Records subsidiary Vik label.

== Reception ==
Professional ratings
Review scores
| Source | Rating |
|---|---|
| AllMusic | 4.5/5 stars |

The AllMusic review by Scott Yanow states, "The music overall on this CD reissue is quite enjoyable and Sims, Cohn and Steward show how much they had grown during the previous decade".

In a review for All About Jazz, Marc Myers called the recording "a superb album that shows off the enormous reed work of four seasoned swingers," and wrote: "The saxophonists sounded as one together but went their merry way when playing alone... The emphasis on blended harmonies and Young-like saxes playing together would become the basis for West Coast jazz just a few years later."

A reviewer for Billboard commented: "The blowing is the thing, and the fellows... give fine accountings of themselves."

== Track listing ==
All compositions by Al Cohn except as indicated

1. "Four Brothers" (Jimmy Giuffre) - 3:46
2. "Ten Years Later" - 3:00
3. "The Pretty One" (Elliot Lawrence) - 3:29
4. "Aged in Wood" - 2:55
5. "Here We Go Again" (Manny Albam) - 3:46
6. "Four and One More" (Gerry Mulligan) - 4:02
7. "So Blue" - 3:22
8. "The Swinging Door" (Mulligan, Zoot Sims) - 2:45
9. "Four in Hand" (Manny Albam) - 3:09
10. "A Quick One" - 3:46

== Personnel ==
- Al Cohn, Zoot Sims, Herbie Steward - tenor saxophone
- Serge Chaloff, Charlie O'Kane (tracks 6–10) - baritone saxophone
- Elliot Lawrence - piano
- Buddy Jones - double bass
- Don Lamond - drums
- Manny Albam, Al Cohn, Elliot Lawrence - arranger
