= True Blue (Al Cohn and Dexter Gordon album) =

Studio album by Al Cohn, Dexter Gordon
- Released: 1976
- Recorded: October 22, 1976
- Genre: Jazz
- Label: Xanadu; 136
- Producer: Don Schlitten

Dexter Gordon chronology
Lullaby for a Monster (1976)	True Blue (1976)	Silver Blue (1976)

Al Cohn chronology
Play It Now (1975)	True Blue (1976)	Silver Blue (1976)

True Blue is a jazz album by saxophonist Dexter Gordon and saxophonist Al Cohn, recorded in 1976 for Xanadu Records.

== Reception ==
Professional ratings
Review scores
Source	Rating
Allmusic	3.5/5 stars
The Rolling Stone Jazz Record Guide	3/5 stars

Allmusic awarded the album 3½ stars with its review by Michael G. Nastos stating, "True Blue is led in title under the auspices of Dexter Gordon as a welcome home party conducted by Don Schlitten for the expatriate tenor saxophonist in 1976. Essentially a jam session, this very talented septet features a two tenor-two trumpet front line, utilized to emphasize the soloing strength of the horns, not necessarily in joyous shouts or big-band like unison outbursts.".

== Track listing ==
1. "Lady Bird" (Tadd Dameron) - 10:59
2. "How Deep Is the Ocean?" (Irving Berlin) - 9:30
3. "True Blue" (Blue Mitchell) - 17:38

== Personnel ==
- Al Cohn & Dexter Gordon - tenor saxophone
- Blue Mitchell, Sam Noto - trumpet
- Barry Harris - piano
- Sam Jones - bass
- Louis Hayes - drums
