= Night Flight to Dakar =

Live album by Al Cohn, Billy Mitchell, Dolo Coker, Leroy Vinnegar and Frank Butler
- Released: 1981
- Recorded: March 14 & 19, 1980
- Venue: Club Taski, Les Almadies and Theatre Nationale Daniel Sorrano, Dakar, Senegal
- Genre: Jazz
- Length: 47:19
- Label: Xanadu; 185
- Producer: Don Schlitten

Billy Mitchell chronology
Xanadu in Africa (1980)	Night Flight to Dakar (1981)	De Lawd's Blues (1980)

Al Cohn chronology
Xanadu in Africa (1980)	Night Flight to Dakar (1980)	Nonpareil (1981)

Night Flight to Dakar is an album by saxophonists Al Cohn and Billy Mitchell, pianist Dolo Coker, bassist Leroy Vinnegar and drummer Frank Butler recorded in Dakar in 1980 for Xanadu Records.

== Reception ==
Professional ratings
Review scores
Source	Rating
Allmusic	4/5 stars

The Allmusic review by Scott Yanow stated "The performances may have been recorded during an African tour but the music is very much American bop with heated versions of "Blues Up and Down," "Sweet Senegalese Brown" and "The King" featuring the tenors in competitive form".

== Track listing ==
1. "Night Flight to Dakar" (Dolo Coker) – 8:43
2. "Don't Let the Sun Catch You Cryin' (Joe Greene) – 6:43
3. "Blues Up and Down" (Gene Ammons, Sonny Stitt) – 9:13
4. "Sweet Senegelese Brown" (Billy Mitchell) – 12:10
5. "The King" (Count Basie) – 10:30

== Personnel ==
- Al Cohn, Billy Mitchell – tenor saxophone
- Dolo Coker – piano
- Leroy Vinnegar – bass
- Frank Butler – drums
