= Cohn on the Saxophone =

Studio album by Al Cohn
- Released: February 1957
- Recorded: September 29, 1956; Webster Hall, New York City
- Genre: Jazz
- Length: 44:44
- Label: Dawn; DLP 1110
- Producer: Chuck Darwin

Al Cohn chronology
The Sax Section (1956)	Cohn on the Saxophone (1957)	The Al Cohn Quintet Featuring Bobby Brookmeyer (1956)

Cohn on the Saxophone is an album by saxophonist Al Cohn recorded in 1956 for the Dawn label.

== Track listing ==
All compositions by Al Cohn except as indicated

1. "We Three" (Nelson Cogane, Sammy Mysels, Dick Robertson) - 3:48
2. "Idaho" (Jesse Stone) - 3:37
3. "The Things I Love" (Harold Barlow, Lew Harris) - 3:52
4. "Singing The Blues" (J. Russel Robinson, Con Conrad, Sam M. Lewis, Joe Young) - 5:06
5. "Be Loose" - 4:18
6. "When Day Is Done" (Buddy DeSylva, Robert Katscher) - 3:54
7. "Good Old Blues" - 4:49
8. "Softly, as in a Morning Sunrise" (Oscar Hammerstein II, Sigmund Romberg) - 3:18
9. "Abstract of You" - 3:44
10. "Blue Lou" (Irving Mills, Edgar Sampson) - 4:09
11. "Them There Eyes" (Maceo Pinkard, Doris Tauber, William Tracey) - 4:09 Bonus track on CD reissue

== Personnel ==
- Al Cohn - tenor saxophone
- Frank Rehak - trombone
- Hank Jones - piano
- Milt Hinton - bass
- Osie Johnson - drums
