= The Al Cohn Quintet Featuring Bobby Brookmeyer =

Studio album by Al Cohn
- Released: 1957
- Recorded: December 3–5, 1956; New York City
- Genre: Jazz
- Length: 40:15
- Label: Coral; CRL 57118
- Producer: Steve Backer

Al Cohn chronology
Cohn on the Saxophone (1956)	The Al Cohn Quintet Featuring Bobby Brookmeyer (1957)	The Four Brothers... Together Again! (1957)

The Al Cohn Quintet Featuring Bobby Brookmeyer is an album by saxophonist, composer and arranger Al Cohn's Quintet with trombonist Bob Brookmeyer recorded in late 1956 for the Coral label.

== Reception ==
Professional ratings
Review scores
Source	Rating
Allmusic	4.5/5 stars
The Penguin Guide to Jazz Recordings	3/4 stars

The Allmusic review by Ken Dryden stated "Cohn and Brookmeyer inspire one another throughout the sessions".

== Track listing ==
All compositions by Al Cohn except as indicated

1. "The Lady Is a Tramp" (Richard Rodgers, Lorenz Hart) - 3:25
2. "Good Spirits" (Bob Brookmeyer) - 3:37
3. "A Blues Serenade" (Frank Signorelli, Vincent Grande, Jimmy Lytell) - 4:23
4. "Lazy Man Stomp" (Brookmeyer) - 2:56
5. "Ill Wind (You're Blowin' Me No Good)" (Harold Arlen, Ted Koehler) - 2:50
6. "Chlo-e (Song of the Swamp)" (Neil Moret, Gus Kahn) - 3:38
7. "S-H-I-N-E" (Cecil Mack, Lew Brown, Ford Dabney) - 3:45
8. "Back to Back" - 2:37
9. "So Far So Good" - 3:50
10. "Winter" - 3:54
11. "I Should Care" (Axel Stordahl, Paul Weston, Sammy Cahn) - 2:41
12. "Bunny Hunch" (Brookmeyer) - 2:39

== Personnel ==
- Al Cohn - tenor saxophone
- Bob Brookmeyer - valve trombone
- Mose Allison - piano
- Teddy Kotick - bass
- Nick Stabulas - drums
