= Blues and Haikus =

Studio album by Jack Kerouac
- Released: October 1959
- Recorded: 1958
- Genre: Spoken word
- Length: 47:08
- Label: Hanover-Signature Record Corporation LP #5006
- Producer: Bob Thiele

Jack Kerouac chronology
Poetry for the Beat Generation (1959)	Blues and Haikus (1959)	Readings by Jack Kerouac on the Beat Generation (1960)

Professional ratings
Review scores
Source	Rating
Allmusic	4.5/5 stars

Blues and Haikus is the American novelist and poet Jack Kerouac's second album and was released in 1959.

== History ==
On the album, Kerouac's poetry readings are accompanied by jazz saxophonists Al Cohn and Zoot Sims. The album is included in the CD box set The Jack Kerouac Collection. It has been released separately on vinyl and CD a number of times.

== Track listing ==
=== Side One ===
1. "American Haikus" – 10:01
2. "Hard Hearted Old Farmer" – 2:13
3. "The Last Hotel/Some of the Dharma" – 3:49

=== Side Two ===
1. "Poems from the Unpublished Book of Blues" – 14:05

=== Bonus Tracks on 1990 CD issue ===
(Outtakes from the Blues and Haikus recording sessions)

1. "Old Western Movies" - 6:42
2. "Conclusion of the Railroad Earth" - 10:05
