= Xanadu in Africa =

Live album by Al Cohn, Billy Mitchell, Dolo Coker, Leroy Vinnegar and Frank Butler
- Released: 1981
- Recorded: March 14, 1980
- Venue: Club Taski, Les Almadies, Dakar, Senegal
- Genre: Jazz
- Length: 46:09
- Label: Xanadu; 180
- Producer: Don Schlitten

Billy Mitchell chronology
The Colossus of Detroit (1978)	Xanadu in Africa (1981)	Night Flight to Dakar (1980)

Al Cohn chronology
No Problem (1978)	Xanadu in Africa (1980)	Night Flight to Dakar (1980)

Xanadu in Africa is an album by saxophonists Al Cohn and Billy Mitchell, pianist Dolo Coker, bassist Leroy Vinnegar and drummer Frank Butler recorded in Dakar in 1980 for Xanadu Records.

== Reception ==
Professional ratings
Review scores
Source	Rating
Allmusic	3/5 stars

The Allmusic review by Scott Yanow stated "Despite the exotic location, this LP contains a typical Xanadu high-quality bebop date. The quintet performs five standards in Senegal (this may very well be the first live recording of American jazz musicians in Africa) and the crowd is rightfully enthusiastic. Even if the music contains few surprises, this album is easily recommended to bop collectors".

== Track listing ==
1. "All or Nothing at All" (Arthur Altman, Jack Lawrence) – 12:22
2. "Robbins Nest" (Illinois Jacquet, Sir Charles Thompson) – 10:40
3. "I Surrender Dear" (Harry Barris, Gordon Clifford) – 8:50
4. "Blues in the Closet" (Oscar Pettiford) – 4:52
5. "Easy Living" (Ralph Rainger, Leo Robin) – 9:25

== Personnel ==
- Al Cohn, Billy Mitchell – tenor saxophone
- Dolo Coker – piano
- Leroy Vinnegar – bass
- Frank Butler – drums
