= You 'n' Me (Al Cohn-Zoot Sims Quintet album) =

Studio album by Al Cohn & Zoot Sims
- Released: 1960
- Recorded: June 1–3, 1960
- Genre: Jazz
- Length: 37:01
- Label: EmArcy
- Producer: Leonard Feather

Al Cohn chronology
Jazz Alive! A Night at the Half Note (1959)	You 'n' Me (1960)	Son of Drum Suite (1960)

Zoot Sims chronology
A Gasser! (1959)	You 'n' Me (1960)	Down Home (1960)

You 'n' Me is a 1960 album by the Zoot Sims and Al Cohn quintet.

== Reception ==
Professional ratings
Review scores
Source	Rating
Allmusic	3/5 stars
The Rolling Stone Jazz Record Guide	3/5 stars
The Penguin Guide to Jazz Recordings	3.5/4 stars

Scott Yanow on Allmusic.com gave the album three stars out of five. Yanow commented on the "Improvisation for Unaccompanied Saxophones", describing it as "...a short but effective two-tenor workout that, through a clever arrangement by Cohn, gives one the impression that both saxophonists are using circular breathing." Yanow also said of the album that "...the co-leaders stick to their main instruments and enjoy swinging..."

== Track listing ==
1. "The Note" (Al Cohn) - 4:11
2. "You'd Be So Nice to Come Home To" (Cole Porter) - 4:51
3. "You 'n' Me" (Cohn) - 4:40
4. "On the Alamo" (Isham Jones, Gus Kahn) - 4:36
5. "The Opener" (Bill Potts) - 3:45
6. "Angel Eyes" (Earl Brent, Matt Dennis) - 3:17
7. "Awful Lonely" (George Handy) - 4:19
8. "Love for Sale" (Porter) - 4:59
9. "Improvisation for Unaccompanied Saxophones" (Cohn, Zoot Sims) - 2:24

== Personnel ==
Performance

- Al Cohn - clarinet, tenor saxophone
- Zoot Sims - tenor saxophone
- Mose Allison - piano
- Major Holley - double bass
- Osie Johnson - drums

Production

- Ken Druker - executive producer
- Leonard Feather - liner notes, original recording producer
- Dave Frishberg - liner notes
- Paul J. Hoeffler - photography
- Peter Keepnews - notes editing
- Hollis King - art direction
- Bryan Koniarz - producer
- Kevin Reeves - mastering
- Cynthia Sesso - photo research
- Mark Smith - production assistant
- Sherniece Smith - art producer
- Chuck Stewart - photography
- Isabelle Wong - design
