= Body and Soul (Al Cohn & Zoot Sims album) =

Studio album by Al Cohn & Zoot Sims
- Released: 1973
- Recorded: March 23, 1973
- Studio: Mediasound, New York City
- Genre: Jazz
- Length: 46:39
- Label: Muse; MR 5016
- Producer: Don Schlitten

Al Cohn chronology
Easy as Pie: Live at the West Bank (1972)	Body and Soul (1973)	Motoring Along (1974)

Zoot Sims chronology
Easy as Pie: Live at the West Bank (1972)	Body and Soul (1973)	Zoot at Ease (1973)

Body and Soul is an album by the Al Cohn and Zoot Sims recorded in 1973 for the Muse label.

== Reception ==
Professional ratings
Review scores
Source	Rating
Allmusic	4.5/5 stars

The Allmusic review by Scott Yanow stated "Cohn and Sims still had very complementary sounds and personalities, so their collaboration on Body and Soul (Muse) holds its own against their earlier dates. ... This is pleasing and frequently lyrical music". On All About Jazz Joel Roberts called it "a thoroughly enjoyable, low-key blowing session featuring the two tenor titans backed by an excellent veteran rhythm section" and noted "Cohn and Sims display that rare musical affinity that only years of playing together can breed".

== Track listing ==
1. "Doodle Oodle" (Billy Byers) – 6:54
2. "Emily" (Johnny Mandel, Johnny Mercer) – 7:19
3. "Samba Medley: Recado Bossa Nova/The Girl from Ipanema/One Note Samba" (Djalma Ferreira/Antônio Carlos Jobim/Jobim) – 7:59
4. "Mama Flossie" (Al Cohn) – 5:43
5. "Body and Soul" (Johnny Green, Frank Eyton, Edward Heyman, Robert Sour) – 5:38
6. "Jean" (Rod McKuen) – 6:03
7. "Blue Hodge" (Gary McFarland) – 7:03

== Personnel ==
- Al Cohn – tenor saxophone
- Zoot Sims – tenor saxophone, soprano saxophone
- Jaki Byard – piano
- George Duvivier – bass
- Mel Lewis – drums
