= The Brothers! =

Studio album by Al Cohn, Bill Perkins and Richie Kamuca
- Released: 1956
- Recorded: June 24 & 25, 1955; Webster Hall, New York City
- Genre: Jazz
- Label: RCA Victor; LPM 1162

Al Cohn chronology
Four Brass One Tenor (1955)	The Brothers! (1956)	From A to...Z (1956)

The Brothers! is an album by the tenor saxophonists Al Cohn, Bill Perkins, and Richie Kamuca recorded in 1955 for the RCA Victor label.

== Reception ==
Professional ratings
Review scores
Source	Rating
Allmusic	3/5 stars

The Allmusic review by Scott Yanow stated "The music is fun and swinging if not all that original or distinctive".

== Track listing ==
1. "Blixed" (Bill Potts) – 3:48
2. "Kim's Kaper" (Bill Perkins) – 3:13
3. "Rolling Stone" (Bob Brookmeyer) – 3:08
4. "Sioux Zan" (Nat Pierce) – 3:08
5. "The Walrus" (Al Cohn) – 2:48
6. "Blue Skies" (Irving Berlin) – 3:12
7. "Gay Blade" (Brookmeyer) – 3:17
8. "Three of a Kind" (Pierce) – 3:13
9. "Hags!" (Potts) – 3:19
10. "Pro-Ex" (Perkins) – 3:04
11. "Strange Again" (Potts) – 3:19
12. "Cap Snapper" (Cohn) – 3:39
13. "Memories of You" (Andy Razaf, Eubie Blake) – 3:02 Bonus track on CD reissue
14. "Saw Buck" (Pierce) – 3:18 Bonus track on CD reissue
15. "Chorus for Morris" (Pierce) – 3:19 Bonus track on CD reissue
16. "Slightly Salty" (Richie Kamuca) – 3:15 Bonus track on CD reissue
- Recorded at Webster Hall in New York City on June 24 (tracks 2, 3, 6–8, 10, 13 & 16) and June 25 (tracks 1, 4, 5, 9, 11, 12, 14 & 15), 1955

== Personnel ==
- Al Cohn, Bill Perkins and Richie Kamuca – tenor saxophone
- Hank Jones – piano
- Barry Galbraith (tracks 2, 3, 6–8, 10, 13, & 16), Sam Beethoven (tracks 1, 4, 5, 9, 11, 12, 14, & 15) – guitar
- John Beal – bass
- Chuck Flores – drums
- Bob Brookmeyer (tracks 3 & 7), Al Cohn (tracks 5, 6, 12, 13, & 16), Bill Perkins (tracks 2 & 10), Nat Pierce (tracks 4, 8, 14, & 15), Bill Potts (tracks 1, 9, & 11) – arranger
