= The Modern Art of Jazz by Zoot Sims =

Studio album by Zoot Sims
- Released: 1956
- Recorded: January 11 & 18, 1956; New York City
- Genre: Jazz
- Length: 55:04 CD reissue with bonus tracks
- Label: Dawn; DLP 1102
- Producer: Chuck Darwin

Zoot Sims chronology
| Zoot Goes to Town (1953) | The Modern Art of Jazz by Zoot Sims (1956) | From A to...Z (1956) |

The Modern Art of Jazz by Zoot Sims (also released as One to Blow On) is an album by American jazz saxophonist Zoot Sims, recorded in 1956 and released on the Dawn label.

== Reception ==
Professional ratings
Review scores
| Source | Rating |
|---|---|
| AllMusic | 4/5 stars |
| The Penguin Guide to Jazz Recordings | 3.5/4 stars |

AllMusic awarded the album 4 stars, with the review by Ken Dryden stating: "These early 1956 sessions feature Zoot Sims in top form playing a pair of standards and originals by members of the quintet. Bob Brookmeyer is the perfect foil for the tenor saxophonist, as they seamlessly interweave intricate lines throughout the record".

== Track listing ==
All compositions by Zoot Sims except as indicated

1. "September in the Rain" (Harry Warren, Al Dubin) - 5:08
2. "Down at the Loft" (John Williams) - 4:29
3. "Ghost of a Chance" (Victor Young, Ned Washington, Bing Crosby) - 6:39
4. "No So Deep" - 7:04
5. "Them There Eyes" (Maceo Pinkard, William Tracey) - 6:01
6. "Our Pad" (Bob Brookmeyer, Gus Johnson) - 4:44
7. "Dark Clouds" - 4:33
8. "One to Blow On" - 5:31
9. "When the Blues Come On" (Al Cohn, Chuck Darwin) - 4:39 Bonus track on CD reissue
10. "Buried Gold" - 6:16 Bonus track on CD reissue

== Personnel ==
- Zoot Sims - tenor saxophone
- Bob Brookmeyer - valve trombone
- John Williams - piano
- Milt Hinton - bass
- Gus Johnson - drums
