= Silver Blue =

Studio album by Al Cohn, Dexter Gordon
- Released: 1976
- Recorded: October 22, 1976, New York City
- Genre: Jazz
- Label: Xanadu; 137
- Producer: Don Schlitten

Dexter Gordon chronology
True Blue (1976)	Silver Blue (1976)	Biting the Apple (1976)

Al Cohn chronology
True Blue (1976)	Silver Blue (1976)	Al Cohn's America (1976)

Silver Blue is a jazz album by saxophonist Dexter Gordon and saxophonist Al Cohn, recorded in 1976 for Xanadu Records.

== Reception ==
Professional ratings
Review scores
Source	Rating
Allmusic	3/5 stars
The Rolling Stone Jazz Record Guide	4/5 stars

Allmusic awarded the album 3 stars with its review by Scott Yanow stating "Recorded at the same session as True Blue, this Xanadu LP gets the edge due to a remarkable version of "On the Trail" that is a fascinating unaccompanied duet... Highly recommended for bop fans".

== Track listing ==
1. "Allen's Alley" (Denzil Best) - 13:37
2. "Silver Blue" (Al Cohn, Dexter Gordon) - 19:34
3. "On the Trail" (Ferde Grofé) - 8:25

== Personnel ==
- Al Cohn & Dexter Gordon - tenor saxophone
- Blue Mitchell, Sam Noto - trumpet
- Barry Harris - piano
- Sam Jones - bass
- Louis Hayes - drums
