= Zoot Sims =

American jazz saxophonist (1925–1985)

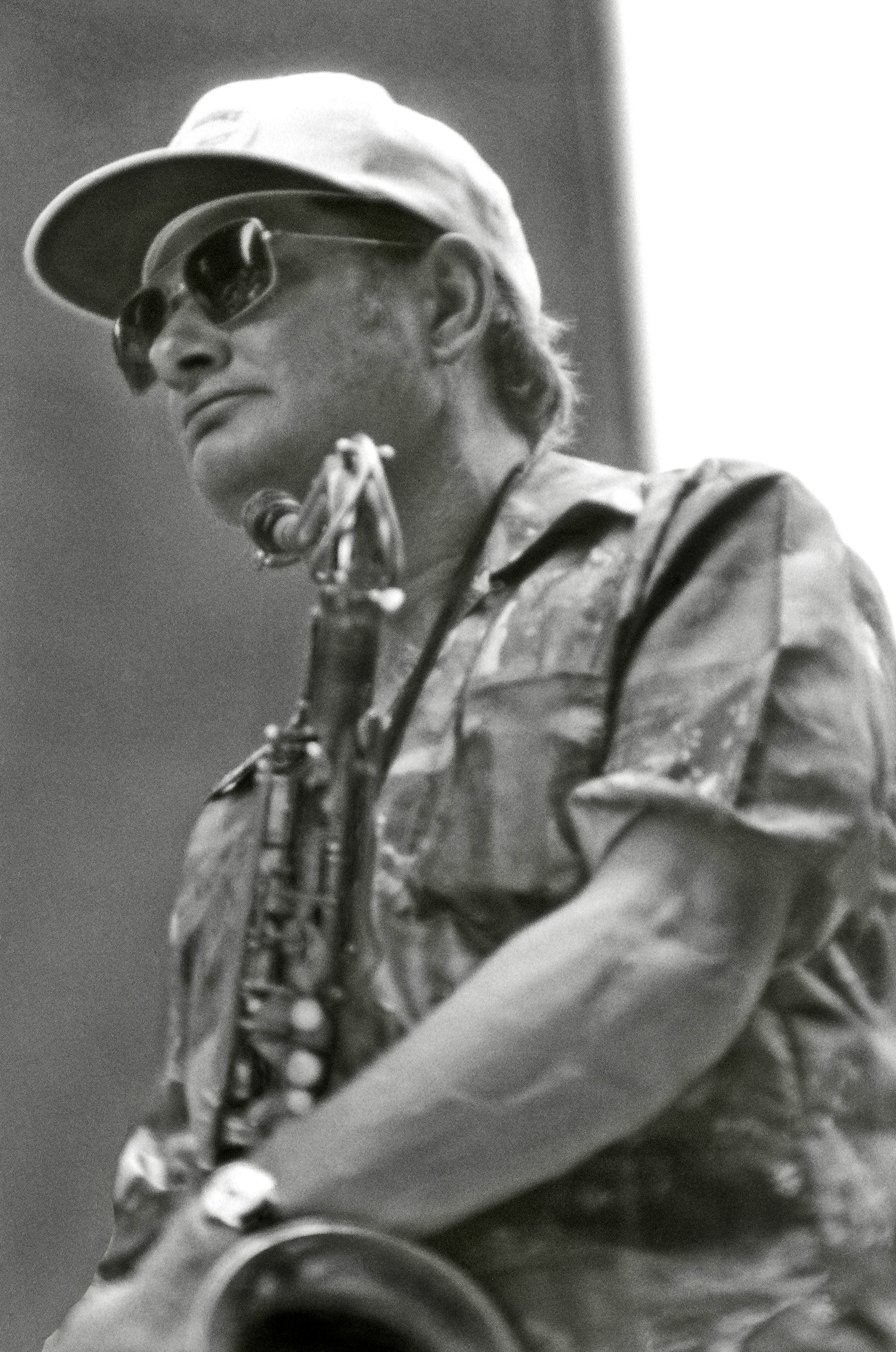
- Sims in 1976

Background information
- Born: John Haley Sims; October 29, 1925; Inglewood, California, U.S.
- Died: March 23, 1985 (aged 59) New York City, U.S.
- Genres: Jazz; big band; cool jazz
- Occupations: Musician; composer
- Instrument: Saxophone
- Years active: 1944–85
- Labels: Pablo; Verve; Epic; Mercury

John Haley "Zoot" Sims (October 29, 1925 – March 23, 1985) was an American jazz saxophonist, playing mainly tenor but also alto (and, later, soprano) saxophone. He first gained attention in the "Four Brothers" sax section of Woody Herman's big band, afterward enjoying a long solo career, often in partnership with fellow saxmen Gerry Mulligan and Al Cohn.

== Biography ==
Sims was born in 1925 in Inglewood, California, United States, to vaudeville performers Kate Haley and John Sims. His father was a vaudeville hoofer, and Sims prided himself on remembering many of the steps his father taught him. Growing up in a performing family, he learned to play drums and clarinet at an early age. His brother was the trombonist Ray Sims.

Sims began on tenor saxophone at the age of 13. He initially modelled his playing on the work of Lester Young, Ben Webster, and Don Byas. By his late teens, having dropped out of high school, he was playing in big bands, starting with those of Kenny Baker and Bobby Sherwood. He joined Benny Goodman's band for the first time in 1943 (he was to rejoin in 1946 and continued to perform with Goodman on occasion through the late 1970s). Sims replaced Ben Webster in Sid Catlett's Quartet of 1944. In May 1944, Sims made his recording debut for Commodore Records in a sextet led by pianist Joe Bushkin, who two months earlier had recorded for the same label as part of Lester Young's Kansas City Six.

Sims served as a corporal in the United States Army Air Force from 1944 to 1946, then returned to music in the bands of Artie Shaw, Stan Kenton, and Buddy Rich. He was one of Woody Herman's "Four Brothers". From 1954 to 1956 he toured with his friend Gerry Mulligan's sextet, and in the early 1960s with Mulligan's Concert Jazz Band. Sims played on some of Jack Kerouac's recordings. From the late 1950s to the end of his life, Sims was primarily a freelancer, though he worked frequently in the 1960s and early 1970s with a group co-led with Al Cohn. In the 1970s and 1980s, Sims also played and recorded regularly with a handful of other musical partners including Bucky Pizzarelli, Joe Venuti, and Jimmy Rowles. In 1975, he began recording for Norman Granz's Pablo Records label. Sims appeared on more than 20 Pablo albums, mostly as a featured solo artist, but also as a backing musician for artists including Count Basie, Sarah Vaughan, and Clark Terry. Between 1974 and 1983, Sims recorded six studio albums with pianist Jimmy Rowles in a quartet setting that critic Scott Yanow said featured Sims at his best.

Sims acquired the nickname "Zoot" early in his career while he was in the Kenny Baker band in California. "When he joined Kenny Baker's band as a fifteen-year-old tenor saxophonist, each of the music stands was embellished with a nonsense word. The one he sat behind said 'Zoot.' That became his name." English musician Zoot Money and the Muppets character Zoot were both named after Zoot Sims.

Sims played a 30-second solo on the song "Poetry Man", written by singer Phoebe Snow on her debut eponymous album in 1974. He also played on Laura Nyro's "Lonely Women" on her album Eli and the Thirteenth Confession.

Sims's last studio recording was a November, 1984 trio session featuring bassist Red Mitchell, recorded in Sweden and released in 1985 by Sonet records. Sims died of lung cancer on March 23, 1985, in New York City and is buried in Oak Hill Cemetery in Nyack, New York.

== Discography ==
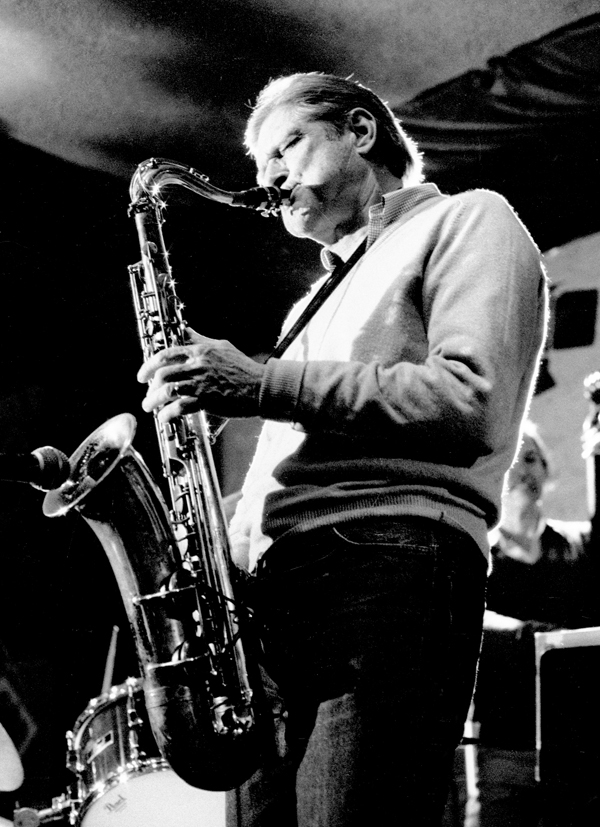
Sims at Keystone Korner, San Francisco, California, 1983

=== As leader/co-leader ===
- 1950: The Zoot Sims Quartet in Paris (Discovery, 1950)
- 1950–51: Swinging with Zoot (Prestige, 1951)
- 1950–51: Tenor Sax Favorites (Prestige, 1951)
- 1949–52: The Brothers with Stan Getz (Prestige, 1956)
- 1952: Contemporary Music as Zoot Sims All Stars (Prestige, 1953) – also released as Zoot Sims All Stars (Esquire)
- 1950–54: Zoot Sims Quintet with Stu Williamson (Prestige, 1954) – reissued as Good Old Zoot (New Jazz, 1962)[LP]
- 1950–54: Zootcase (Prestige, 1975)[2LP]
- 1954?: Zoot Simms In Hollywood (New Jazz, 1954)
- 1954: Happy Minors with Red Mitchell, Bob Brookmeyer (Bethlehem, 1955)
- 1955: Playing as Hall Daniels' Septet (Jump, 1955) – reissued as Nash–Ville (Zim, 1977) with Dick Nash
- 1956: The Modern Art of Jazz by Zoot Sims (Dawn, 1956)
- 1956: From A to...Z with Al Cohn (RCA Victor, 1957)
- 1956: Tonite's Music Today with Bob Brookmeyer (Storyville, 1956)
- 1956: Whooeeee with Bob Brookmeyer (Storyville, 1956)
- 1956: Zoot Sims Avec Henri Renaud Et Son Orchestre Et Jon Eardley with Henri Renaud Et Son Orchestre and Jon Eardley (Ducretet–Thomson, 1956)
- 1956: Zoot (Argo Records, 1957)
- 1956: Zoot! (Riverside, 1957)
- 1956: Tenor Conclave with John Coltrane, Al Cohn, Hank Mobley, Red Garland, Paul Chambers and Art Taylor (Prestige, 1957)
- 1956: Goes to Jazzville (Dawn, 1957)
- 1956: Live at Falcon Lair with Joe Castro Trio (Pablo, 2004)
- 1956: Zoot Sims Plays Alto, Tenor, and Baritone (ABC-Paramount, 1957)
- 1956–57: Bohemia After Dark (Jazz Hour, 1994)
- 1957: The Four Brothers... Together Again! with Herbie Steward et al. (Vik, 1957)
- 1957: Zoot Sims Plays Four Altos (ABC-Paramount, 1957)
- 1957: Al and Zoot with Al Cohn (Coral, 1957)
- 1957: Locking Horns with Joe Newman (Rama, 1957)
- 1957–58: Happy Over Hoagy with Al Cohn Septet (Jass, 1987) – complete session plus 1961 live date with Mose Allison was released as The Hoagy Carmichael Sessions And More (Lone Hill Jazz, 2004)
- 1958: Stretching Out with Bob Brookmeyer et al. (United Artists, 1959)
- 1954–59: Choice (Pacific Jazz, 1961)
- 1959: Jazz Alive! A Night at the Half Note with Al Cohn and Phil Woods (United Artists, 1959) – live
- 1959?: A Gasser! with Annie Ross (World Pacific, 1959)
- 1959–60: Either Way with Al Cohn (Fred Miles, 1961)
- 1960: You 'n' Me with Al Cohn (Mercury, 1960)
- 1960: Down Home (Bethlehem, 1960)
- 1961: Either Way with Al Cohn (Fred Miles Presents, 1961)
- 1961: Zoot at Ronnie Scott's (Fontana, 1962)
- 1961: Solo for Zoot (Fontana, 1962)
- 1962?: New Beat Bossa Nova Means The Samba Swings (Colpix, 1962)
- 1962?: New Beat Bossa Nova Vol. 2 (Colpix, 1962)
- 1964: Two Jims and Zoot with Jimmy Raney and Jim Hall (Mainstream, 1964) – also released as Outra Vez
- 1965: Inter-Action with Sonny Stitt (Cadet, 1965)
- 1965: Suitably Zoot (Pumpkin, 1979)
- 1965: Al and Zoot in London with Al Cohn (World Record Club, 1967)
- 1965: At the Half Note Again – not officially released
- 1966: Waiting Game (Impulse!, 1966)
- 1967: The Greatest Jazz Concert in the World (Pablo, 1975)
- 1968: Easy as Pie: Live at the Left Bank with Al Cohn (Label M, 2001)
- 1973: Body and Soul with Al Cohn (Muse, 1973)
- 1973: Zoot Suite (High Note, 2007) – live audience recording
- 1973: Joe & Zoot with Joe Venuti (Chiaroscuro, 1974) – expanded reissue as Joe & Zoot & More (Chiaroscuro, 2002)
- 1974: Zoot Sims' Party (Choice, 1974) – released as Getting Sentimental (Candid, 1997)[CD]
- 1974: Nirvana with Bucky Pizzarelli and special guest Buddy Rich (Groove Merchant, 1974) – reissued as Somebody Loves Me (Lester Recording Catalog, 2003)
- 1974: Strike Up the Band with Bobby Hackett and Bucky Pizzarelli (Flying Dutchman, 1975)
- 1974: Dave McKenna Quartet Featuring Zoot Sims (Chiaroscuro, 1974) with Dave McKenna – reissued in 1994 on CD with four extra tracks
- 1974: Motoring Along with Al Cohn and Horace Parlan (Sonet, 1975)
- 1975: Basie & Zoot with Count Basie (Pablo, 1975)
- 1975: Zoot Sims and the Gershwin Brothers with Oscar Peterson and Joe Pass (Pablo, 1975)
- 1975 The Tenor Giants Featuring Oscar Peterson with Eddie "Lockjaw" Davis (Pablo, 1975)
- 1976: Zoot Sims With Bucky Pizzarelli with Bucky Pizzarelli (Classic Jazz, 1976) – also released as Summon
- 1976: Soprano Sax with Ray Bryant and George Mraz (Pablo, 1976)
- 1976: Hawthorne Nights (Pablo, 1977)
- 1977: If I'm Lucky with Jimmy Rowles (Pablo, 1977)
- 1978: For Lady Day with Jimmy Rowles (Pablo, 1991)
- 1978: Zoot Sims in Copenhagen (Storyville, 1995)
- 1978: Just Friends with Harry Edison (Pablo, 1980)
- 1978: Warm Tenor with Jimmy Rowles (Pablo, 1979)
- 1978: The Sweetest Sounds with Rune Gustafsson (Sonet Gramofon/Pablo Today, 1979)
- 1979–80: The Swinger (Pablo, 1981)
- 1979–80: Passion Flower: Zoot Sims Plays Duke Ellington (Pablo, 1980)
- 1981: I Wish I Were Twins with Jimmy Rowles (Pablo, 1981)
- 1981: Art 'n' Zoot with Art Pepper (Pablo, 1995)
- 1982: The Innocent Years as The Zoot Sims Four (Pablo, 1982)
- 1982: Blues for Two with Joe Pass (Pablo, 1983)
- 1983: On The Korner (Pablo, 1994) – the last recording at The Keystone Korner
- 1983: Suddenly It's Spring (Pablo, 1983)
- 1984: Quietly There: Zoot Sims Plays Johnny Mandel (Pablo, 1984) – compositions of Johnny Mandel

Compilations

- The Best of Zoot Sims (Pablo, 1980)
- That Old Feeling (Chess, 1995) – double-issue CD of two 1956 albums: Zoot and Zoot Sims Plays Alto, Tenor, and Baritone

=== As sideman ===
With Pepper Adams

- Pepper Adams Plays the Compositions of Charlie Mingus (Workshop Jazz, 1964) – rec. 1963
- Encounter! (Prestige, 1969) – rec. 1968

With Chet Baker

- Chet Baker & Strings (Columbia, 1954) – rec. 1953-54
- Chet Baker Plays the Best of Lerner and Loewe (Riverside, 1959)

With Count Basie

- The Bosses with Big Joe Turner (Pablo, 1973)
- Count Basie Jam (Gruppo Editoriale Fabbri, 1981) – rec. 1977

With Al Cohn

- The Sax Section (Epic, 1956)
- Son of Drum Suite (RCA Victor, 1960)
- Jazz Mission to Moscow (Colpix, 1962)

With Woody Herman

- The Thundering Herds (Columbia, 1966) - rec. 1945-1947
- Keeper Of The Flame (The Complete Capitol Recordings Of The Four Brothers Band) (Capitol, 1992) - rec. 1948-1949
- New Big Herd At The Monterey Jazz Festival (Atlantic, 1960) – rec. 1959

With Quincy Jones

- This Is How I Feel About Jazz (ABC-Paramount, 1957) – rec. 1956-1957
- The Birth of a Band! (Mercury, 1959)
- Quincy Jones Explores the Music of Henry Mancini (Mercury, 1964)
- Quincy Plays for Pussycats (Mercury, 1965) – rec. 1959-1965

With Stan Kenton

- Portraits on Standards (Capitol, 1953)
- The Kenton Era (Capitol, 1955) – rec. 1940-1954

With Carmen McRae

- Something to Swing About (Kapp, 1960) – rec. 1959
- Ms. Jazz (Groove Merchant, 1974) – rec. 1973

With Gerry Mulligan

- California Concerts (Pacific Jazz, 1955) – rec. 1954
- Presenting the Gerry Mulligan Sextet (EmArcy, 1955)
- Mainstream of Jazz (EmArcy, 1956)
- A Profile of Gerry Mulligan (EmArcy, 1959) – rec. 1955-1956
- The Arranger (1946-1957) (Columbia, 1977) – rec. 1946-1957
- The Gerry Mulligan Songbook (World Pacific, 1958) – rec. 1957
- The Concert Jazz Band (Verve, 1960)
- Gerry Mulligan and the Concert Jazz Band on Tour (Verve, 1962) – rec. 1960
- Something Borrowed – Something Blue (Limelight, 1966)

With Oliver Nelson

- Encyclopedia of Jazz (Verve, 1967) – rec. 1965-1966
- The Sound of Feeling (Verve, 1968) – rec. 1966-1967

With Sarah Vaughan

- Vaughan and Violins (Mercury, 1959) – rec. 1958
- The Duke Ellington Songbook, Vol. 1 (Pablo, 1979)
- Linger Awhile: Live at Newport and More (Pablo, 2000) – rec. 1957-1982

With Joe Williams

- At Newport '63 (RCA Victor, 1963)
- Having The Blues Under European Sky (Denon, 1985) – live rec. 1970s

With Others

- Trigger Alpert, Trigger Happy! (Riverside, 1956)
- Louie Bellson, Louis Bellson Quintet (Norgran, 1955) – rec. 1954
- Clifford Brown, Jazz Immortal (Pacific Jazz, 2001) – rec. 1954
- Ray Charles, The Genius of Ray Charles (Atlantic, 1959)
- The Kenny Clarke/Francy Boland Big Band, Jazz Is Universal (Atlantic, 1962) – rec. 1961
- Chris Connor, Chris Connor (Atlantic, 1956)
- Miles Davis, Plays Al Cohn Compositions (Miles Davis and Horns CD) (Prestige, 1956) – rec. 1953
- Kenny Dorham, Hot Stuff From Brazil (West Wind, 1990) – rec. 1961
- Jon Eardley, The Jon Eardley Seven (Prestige, 1956) – reissued as Zoot Sims Koo Koo (Status, 1965)
- Booker Ervin, The Book Cooks (Bethlehem, 1961) – rec. 1960
- Bill Evans, Loose Blues (Milestone, 1982) – rec. 1962
- Art Farmer, The Aztec Suite (United Artists, 1959)
- Curtis Fuller, South American Cookin' (Epic, 1961)
- Benny Goodman, Benny Goodman in Moscow (RCA Victor, 1962)
- Bobby Hackett, Creole Cookin' (Verve, 1967)
- Coleman Hawkins, The Hawk in Hi Fi with Billy Byers and his orchestra (RCA Victor, 1956)
- Jutta Hipp, Jutta Hipp with Zoot Sims (Blue Note, 1957) – rec. 1956
- Chubby Jackson, All Star Big Band (Prestige, 1950)
- Jack Kerouac, Blues and Haikus (Hanover-Signature, 1959) – rec. 1958
- Irene Kral, SteveIreneo! (United Artists, 1959)
- Elliot Lawrence, Big Band Modern (Jazztone, 1957)
- Michel Legrand, After The Rain (Pablo, 1983) – rec. 1982
- Stan Levey and Red Mitchell, West Coast Rhythm (Affinity, 1982) – rec. 1954-1955
- The Manhattan Transfer, The Manhattan Transfer (Atlantic, 1975)
- Gary McFarland, Profiles (Impulse!, 1966)
- Ted McNabb, Big Band Swing (Epic, 1960) – rec. 1959
- The Metronome All-Stars, Metronome All-Stars 1956 (Clef, 1956)
- Charles Mingus, The Complete Town Hall Concert (Blue Note, 1994) – rec. 1962
- Red Mitchell, Happy Minors (Bethlehem, 1955) also with Bob Brookmeyer – rec. 1954
- Jack Montrose, Arranged by Montrose (Pacific Jazz, 1955) – rec. 1954
- Anita O'Day, All the Sad Young Men (Verve, 1962) – rec. 1961
- Bud Powell, Live at the Blue Note Café, Paris 1961
- Bob Prince, Saxes Inc. (Warner Bros, 1959)
- Buddy Rich and Lionel Hampton, Transition (Groove Merchant, 1974)
- Shorty Rogers, Shorty Rogers Courts the Count (RCA Victor, 1954)
- Jimmy Rushing, The You And Me That Used To Be (RCA, 1971)
- Lalo Schifrin and Bob Brookmeyer, Samba Para Dos (Verve, 1963)
- Johnny Smith, Moonlight in Vermont (Roost, 1956) – rec. 1952-53
- Phoebe Snow, Phoebe Snow (Shelter, 1974) – rec. 1973
- Sonny Stitt, Broadway Soul (Colpix, 1965)
- Clark Terry, Mother ! Mother ! (Pablo, 1980) – rec. 1979
- Joe Venuti, The Joe Venuti Blue Four (Chiaroscuro, 1974)
- Chuck Wayne, The Jazz Guitarist (Savoy, 1956) – rec. 1953

== See also ==
- Zoot Money
