= Al Cohn =

American jazz saxophonist (1925–1988)

- Cohn at Lennie's on the Turnpike in 1965

Background information
- Born: Alvin Gilbert Cohn; November 24, 1925; Brooklyn, New York, U.S.
- Died: February 15, 1988 (aged 62) Stroudsburg, Pennsylvania, U.S.
- Genres: Jazz; West Coast jazz
- Occupations: Musician; arranger; composer; bandleader
- Instrument: Tenor saxophone
- Years active: 1940s–1980s
- Labels: Savoy; RCA Victor; Coral; Mercury; Xanadu; Concord; Timeless
- Formerly of: Woody Herman; Zoot Sims
- Spouse: Marilyn Moore
- Relatives: Joe Cohn (son); Shaye Cohn (granddaughter)

Alvin Gilbert Cohn (November 24, 1925 – February 15, 1988) was an American jazz saxophonist, arranger, and composer. He came to prominence in the band of clarinetist Woody Herman and was known for his longtime musical partnership with fellow saxophonist Zoot Sims.

== Biography ==
Cohn was born in Brooklyn, New York.

In addition to his work as a jazz tenor saxophonist, Cohn was widely respected as an arranger. His work included the Broadway productions of Raisin' and Sophisticated Ladies, and his arrangements of his own compositions were recorded by big bands led by Maynard Ferguson, Gerry Mulligan, Terry Gibbs, and Bob Brookmeyer. Cohn also arranged for unreleased Linda Ronstadt recordings in the 1980s.

Zoot Sims (left) and Cohn at Lennie's on the Turnpike in Peabody, Massachusetts, 1965

In June 1972, Cohn appeared on stage with Elvis Presley as a member of the Joe Malin Orchestra at Madison Square Garden.

Cohn's first wife was the singer Marilyn Moore. His son, Joe Cohn, is a jazz guitarist. His granddaughter Shaye Cohn, Joe's daughter, is also a musician and plays the cornet with her band, Tuba Skinny.

Cohn died of liver cancer in Stroudsburg, Pennsylvania, in 1988.

== Discography ==
=== As leader/co-leader ===
- Al Cohn's Tones (Savoy, 1950)
- East Coast-West Coast Scene (RCA Victor, 1954) – split album with Shorty Rogers
- Mr. Music (RCA Victor, 1955)
- The Natural Seven (RCA Victor, 1955)
- That Old Feeling (RCA Victor, 1955)
- Four Brass One Tenor (RCA Victor, 1955)
- The Brothers! (RCA Victor, 1955) – with Bill Perkins and Richie Kamuca
- From A to... Z (RCA Victor, 1956) – the Al Cohn / Zoot Sims Sextet
- The Sax Section (Epic, 1956)
- Cohn on the Saxophone (Dawn, 1956)
- The Al Cohn Quintet Featuring Bobby Brookmeyer (Coral, 1956) – with Bob Brookmeyer
- Tenor Conclave (Prestige, 1957) – with John Coltrane, Hank Mobley, and Zoot Sims
- The Four Brothers... Together Again! (Vik, 1957) – with Serge Chaloff, Zoot Sims, and Herbie Steward
- Al and Zoot (Coral, 1957) – with Zoot Sims
- Jazz Alive! A Night at the Half Note (United Artists, 1959) – with Zoot Sims and Phil Woods
- You 'n' Me (Mercury, 1960) – the Al Cohn / Zoot Sims Quintet
- Son of Drum Suite (RCA Victor, 1960)
- Either Way (Fred Miles Presents, 1961) – with Zoot Sims
- Jazz Mission to Moscow (Colpix, 1962)
- Al & Zoot in London (World Record Club, 1965)
- Easy as Pie: Live at the West Bank (Label M, 1968) – with Zoot Sims
- Body and Soul (Muse, 1973) – with Zoot Sims
- Motoring Along (Sonet, 1974) – with Zoot Sims
- Play It Now (Xanadu, 1975)
- True Blue (Xanadu, 1976) – with Dexter Gordon
- Silver Blue (Xanadu, 1976) – with Dexter Gordon
- Al Cohn's America (Xanadu, 1976)
- Heavy Love (Xanadu, 1977) – with Jimmy Rowles
- No Problem (Xanadu, 1979)
- Xanadu in Africa (Xanadu, 1980 [1981]) – with Billy Mitchell, Dolo Coker, Leroy Vinnegar, and Frank Butler
- Night Flight to Dakar (Xanadu, 1980 [1982]) 00 with Billy Mitchell, Dolo Coker, Leroy Vinnegar, and Frank Butler
- Nonpareil (Concord, 1981) – with Lou Levy, Monty Budwig, and Jake Hanna
- Tour de Force (1981) – live in Japan, with tenor saxophonists Buddy Tate and Scott Hamilton
- Standards of Excellence (Concord, 1984)
- The Claw (Chiaroscuro, 1986) – with Flip Phillips
- Rifftide (Timeless, 1987) – with Rein de Graaf (piano), Koos Serierse (bass), and Eric Ineke (drums)

=== As sideman ===
With Manny Albam

- The Drum Suite (RCA Victor, 1956) – with Ernie Wilkins

With Mose Allison

- Your Mind Is on Vacation (Atlantic, 1976)

With Trigger Alpert

- Trigger Happy! (Riverside, 1956) – also released as East Coast Sounds

With George Barnes

- Guitars Galore (Mercury, 1961)

With Art Blakey

- Art Blakey Big Band (Bethlehem, 1957)

With Bob Brookmeyer

- Bob Brookmeyer Featuring Al Cohn (Storyville, 1954)
- Brookmeyer (Vik, 1956)
- Kansas City Revisited (United Artists, 1958)
- Stretching Out (United Artists, 1958) – with Zoot Sims
- Portrait of the Artist (Atlantic, 1960)
- Gloomy Sunday and Other Bright Moments (Verve, 1961)

With Kenny Burrell

- Earthy (Prestige, 1957)

With Buck Clayton

- How Hi the Fi (Columbia, 1954)
- Jumpin' at the Woodside (Columbia, 1955)

With Miles Davis

- The Compositions of Al Cohn (Prestige, 1953)
- Miles Davis and Horns (Prestige, 1956)

With Jimmy Giuffre

- The Music Man (Atlantic, 1958)

With Freddie Green

- Mr. Rhythm (RCA Victor, 1955)

With Urbie Green

- All About Urbie Green and His Big Band (ABC-Paramount, 1956)

With Coleman Hawkins

- The Hawk in Hi Fi (RCA Victor, 1956)

With Woody Herman

- The Thundering Herds (Columbia, 1945–47 [1966])
- Keeper of the Flame (The Complete Capitol Recordings of the Four Brothers Band) (Capitol, 1948–49 [1992])

With Quincy Jones

- Quincy Plays for Pussycats (Mercury, 1959–65 [1965])

With Jack Kerouac

- Blues and Haikus (1960)

With Jimmy Knepper

- Cunningbird (SteepleChase, 1976)

With Mundell Lowe

- Satan in High Heels (Charlie Parker, 1961) – soundtrack

With the Metronome All-Stars

- Metronome All-Stars 1956 (Clef, 1956)

With Gary McFarland

- The Jazz Version of "How to Succeed in Business without Really Trying" (Verve, 1962)

With Carmen McRae

- Birds of a Feather (Decca, 1958)

With Gerry Mulligan

- The Gerry Mulligan Songbook (World Pacific, 1957)

With Joe Newman

- All I Wanna Do Is Swing (RCA Victor, 1955)
- I'm Still Swinging (RCA Victor, 1955)
- Salute to Satch (RCA Victor, 1956)

With Oscar Pettiford

- Oscar Pettiford Sextet (Vogue, 1954)

With Lalo Schifrin and Bob Brookmeyer

- Samba Para Dos (Verve, 1963)

=== As arranger ===
With Maynard Ferguson

- Come Blow Your Horn (Cameo, 1963)[1 track]

With Astrud Gilberto

- Look to the Rainbow (Verve, 1966)

With Quincy Jones

- The Birth of a Band! (Mercury, 1959)
- The Great Wide World of Quincy Jones (Mercury, 1959)

With Irene Kral

- The Band and I (United Artists, 1958)
- SteveIreneo! (United Artists, 1959)

With Gerry Mulligan

- Holliday with Mulligan (DRG, 1961 [1980]) – with Judy Holliday

With Mark Murphy

- That's How I Love the Blues! (Riverside, 1962)

With Joe Newman

- The Happy Cats (Coral, 1957)

With Herb Pomeroy

- The Band and I (United Artists, 1958) – with Irene Kral
