= Poetry for the Beat Generation =

Studio album (spoken word) by Jack Kerouac
- Released: April 1959
- Recorded: 1958
- Genres: Jazz, spoken word
- Length: 40:08
- Labels: Dot Records; Hanover Records
- Producer: Bob Thiele

Jack Kerouac chronology
Poetry for the Beat Generation (1959)	Blues and Haikus (1959)

Professional ratings
Review scores
Source	Rating
Allmusic	4/5 stars

Poetry for the Beat Generation is the debut album of American novelist and poet Jack Kerouac and was originally released in 1959. Initial performances of these poems were poorly received by an audience at the Village Vanguard in 1957. However, Kerouac was so impressed with how the poems sounded when accompanied by Steve Allen's piano that it became the first record Kerouac committed to audio.

== History ==
Kerouac is accompanied by Steve Allen on the piano. All songs were written by Kerouac. The album is included in the CD box set The Jack Kerouac Collection, and has been issued separately on vinyl and CD a number of times.

== Track listing ==
=== Side One ===
1. "October in the Railroad Earth" – 7:08
2. "Deadbelly" – 1:02
3. "Charlie Parker" – 3:43
4. "The Sounds of the Universe Coming in My Window" – 3:14
5. "One Mother" – 0:47
6. "Goofing at the Table" – 1:42
7. "Bowery Blues" – 3:48

=== Side Two ===
1. "Abraham" – 1:14
2. "Dave Brubeck" – 0:27
3. "I Had a Slouch Hat Too One Time" – 6:11
4. "The Wheel of the Quivering Meat Conception" – 1:51
5. "McDougal Street Blues" – 3:23
6. "The Moon Her Majesty" – 1:36
7. "I'd Rather Be Thin Than Famous" – 0:37

=== Bonus Tracks on 1990 CD issue ===
(Taken from the Steve Allen Plymouth Show, NBC Broadcast, Monday 10:00pm, 16 November 1959 Eastern time)

1. "Readings from On the Road & Visions of Cody" – 3:31
