= Down Home (Zoot Sims album) =

Studio album by Zoot Sims
- Released: July 1960
- Recorded: June 7, 1960
- Genre: Jazz
- Length: 1:12:44
- Label: Bethlehem
- Producer: Teddy Charles

Zoot Sims chronology
You 'n' Me (1960)	Down Home (1960)	At the Half Note Again (1965)

Down Home is an album by American jazz tenor saxophonist Zoot Sims.

== Reception ==
Professional ratings
Review scores
Source	Rating
AllMusic	4/5 stars
Billboard	3/4 stars
The Penguin Guide to Jazz	4/4 stars
DownBeat	4/5 stars

Billboard called it an "unusual album", in that Sims "applied his improvisational skill to a number of real oldies". The magazine reviewed the singles as well, noting the "all-star rhythm section" and generally saying the songs were "perfect for jazz jukeboxes". Down Beat called it "a marvellous example of Sims' ability to swing".

Scott Yanow, writing for AllMusic, called it "enjoyable and consistently swinging", noting that it "gives one a look at the great pianist Dave McKenna in his early days". The Penguin Guide to Jazz described it as "a classic Zoot date, with the saxophonist swinging as hard as ever and McKenna offering his characteristic full-blooded support".

DownBeat said that "this is a marvelous example of Sims' ability to swing".

== Track listing ==
No.	Title	Writer(s)	Length
1.	"Jive at Five"	Count Basie, Harry "Sweets" Edison	5:18
2.	"Doggin' Around"	Edgar Battle, Ray Evans	4:39
3.	"Avalon"	Buddy DeSylva, Al Jolson, Vincent Rose	4:29
4.	"I Cried for You"	Gus Arnheim, Arthur Freed, Abe Lyman	6:50
5.	"Bill Bailey"	Hughie Cannon	5:17
6.	"Goodnight, Sweetheart"	Jimmy Campbell, Reginald Connelly, Ray Noble	4:22
7.	"There'll Be Some Changes Made"	Billy Higgins, W. Benton Overstreet	5:24
8.	"I've Heard That Blues Before"	Zoot Sims	5:26
9.	"There'll Be Some Changes Made" (Alternate take)	Billy Higgins, W. Benton Overstreet	6:46
10.	"Jive at Five" (Alternate take)	Count Basie, Harry "Sweets" Edison	6:17
11.	"Doggin' Around" (Alternate take)	Edgar Battle, Ray Evans	3:36
12.	"Avalon" (Alternate take)	Buddy DeSylva, Al Jolson, Vincent Rose	4:09
13.	"Goodnight, Sweetheart" (Alternate take)	Jimmy Campbell, Reginald Connelly, Ray Noble	5:09
14.	"Bill Bailey" (Alternate take)	Hughie Cannon	5:02
Total length:			1:12:44

== Personnel ==
- Zoot Sims – tenor saxophone
- Dave McKenna – piano
- George Tucker – double bass
- Dannie Richmond – drums
