= Peace Piece =

Bill Evans piano composition

Song by Bill Evans

from the album Everybody Digs Bill Evans
- Released: 1959
- Recorded: December 15, 1958
- Studio: Reeves Sound Studios, New York City
- Genre: Jazz
- Length: 6:37
- Label: Riverside
- Composer: Bill Evans
- Producer: Orrin Keepnews

"Peace Piece" is a jazz piece recorded by Bill Evans in December 1958 for his album Everybody Digs Bill Evans. It is a pastoral improvisation done at the end of the recording session and is one of his simplest, built on a gentle Cmaj7 to G9sus4 two-chord progression that Evans had used earlier during the session for his version of "Some Other Time" from Leonard Bernstein's musical On the Town. It also reappeared in the opening to "Flamenco Sketches", which Evans recorded with Miles Davis the following year on the album Kind of Blue; Davis had taken a liking to the piece and wanted to reuse it.

Although a peaceful piece, it contains many discordant notes in the latter half. The composition, with its free-form peaceful melody and timeless, meditational quality, has featured in numerous soundtracks of films and music in ballet choreography and has been recorded by fellow jazz musicians.

== Composition and reviews ==
Evans evokes the feeling of being alone in the piece and recalled that a teenage fan said that when he first heard it he "felt like he was standing all alone in New York". Evans had many requests to play the piece live in his last years, but he refused because he believed that the composition would lose its value and meaning, as it had been an inspiration at the moment only. He played it live just twice. First as part of a spoken introduction Live at the Trident Club in 1964, and once with the Bill Evans Dance Company in Seattle in 1978 to accompany an abstract and lyrical modern dance put on by the dancers.

Chuck Israels, later a bassist of the Bill Evans Trio, wrote of Peace Piece on his website:

Peace Piece is an example of the depth of Evans' compositional technique. It is an ostinato piece, composed and recorded long before the more recent superficial synthesis of Indian and American music; in fact, it owes more to Satie and Debussy than to Ravi Shankar. The improvisation starts simply over a gentle ostinato, which quickly fades into the background. Evans allows the fantasy that evolves from the opening motive (an inversion of the descending fifth in the ostinato) more freedom than he would in an improvisation tied to a changing accompaniment. He takes advantage of the ostinato as a unifying element against which ideas flower, growing more lush and colorful as the piece unfolds. Polytonalities and cross rhythms increase in density as the ostinato undulates gently, providing a central rhythmic and tonal reference. The improvisation becomes increasingly complex against the unrelenting simplicity of the accompaniment, until, near the end, Evans gradually reconciles the two elements."

Jacques Réda, a poet and jazz critic, has written a poem in French about Peace Piece.

Peace Piece bears some resemblance to Frédéric Chopin's Berceuse in Db major; both pieces use a two-chord left-hand ostinato throughout, and they both have an ornamented melody line.

American jazz musician and YouTuber Charles Cornell notes that Bill Evans may have been influenced by Erik Satie's Vexations.

== In popular culture ==
The piece has been used in several films, including Corrina, Corrina in 1994 (performed by John Beasley), Peace Is Every Step in 1997 (Bill Evans version), Jack Goes Boating in 2010 (Bill Evans version), and Roman J. Israel, Esq. in 2017. Niemand in de stad (film) in 2018.

It can be heard in Bo Widerberg's Love 65 (1965), Gaurav Seth's A Passage to Ottawa, Philip Seymour Hoffman's Jack Goes Boating (2010), and Dan Gilroy's Roman J. Israel, Esq. (2017).

In 2003, text art collective Young-Hae Chang Heavy Industries used "Peace Piece" in 0PERATI0N NUK0REA, a fictional story about the nuclear destruction of Seoul in a future war between South and North Korea.

== Covers ==
The track 'Fix It' by Lady Blackbird from the 2021 album 'Black Acid Soul' uses Peace Piece as its musical base. Pianists Richie Beirach, Ricardo Fioravanti, Liz Story and Stefano Battaglia, the guitarists Stephen D. Anderson and Nino Josele, flautist Herbie Mann, and classical pianists Jean-Yves Thibaudet, Roy Eaton, and Igor Levit have all recorded Peace Piece. The Kronos Quartet also recorded Peace Piece as a string quartet on the album Music of Bill Evans.
