= Portrait in Jazz =

Studio album by The Bill Evans Trio
- Released: 1960
- Recorded: December 28, 1959
- Studios: Reeves Sound Studios, New York City
- Genre: Jazz
- Length: 43:20 (original LP); 61:13 (CD reissue)
- Labels: Riverside; RLP 12-315
- Producer: Orrin Keepnews

The Bill Evans Trio chronology
The Ivory Hunters (1959)	Portrait in Jazz (1960)	Explorations (1961)

Portrait in Jazz is the fifth studio album by American jazz pianist Bill Evans as a leader, released in 1960. It is the first of only two studio albums to be recorded with his famous trio featuring bassist Scott LaFaro and drummer Paul Motian. It was originally released in both mono and stereo editions, each featuring a different take of "Autumn Leaves."

== Background ==
Eight months after his successful collaboration with Miles Davis on the album Kind of Blue, Evans recorded Portrait in Jazz with a new group, the first Bill Evans Trio, that helped change the direction of modern jazz.

Most notably, LaFaro's bass is promoted from a mere accompanying instrument to one of almost equal status to the piano, although not to the extent that it would be on later albums such as Sunday at the Village Vanguard. Evans said of LaFaro, "I was astounded by his creativity. ... There was so much music in him, he had a problem controlling it. ... He certainly stimulated me to other areas, and perhaps I helped him contain some of his enthusiasm. It was a wonderful thing and worth all the effort that we made later to suppress the ego and work for a common result."

Motian had recorded previously with Evans on his debut album, New Jazz Conceptions, as well as in groups led by Tony Scott, George Russell, and others. Evans biographer Keith Shadwick notes that Motian at this point tended to avoid standard bop formulas and would "react instead to what he actually heard coming from the other two musicians," which "added in no small degree to the unique quality of Evans's first working trio."

== Repertoire ==
The album includes seven jazz standards and two Evans compositions. The Disney song "Someday My Prince Will Come" had first been used as a vehicle for modern jazz by Dave Brubeck two years earlier on his album Dave Digs Disney and two years later would serve as the title track for an album by Miles Davis. It would remain a staple of Evans's repertoire to the end of his career, with many later live recordings of it in circulation.

Evans's composition "Peri's Scope" was inspired by his then-girlfriend, Peri Cousins, who said the recording made her feel "immortal." It has gone on to be covered several dozens times, including by important jazz artists such as Fred Hersch (1990) and Chick Corea (2011). The last track on the album is a new trio version of "Blue in Green," a composition with disputed authorship that had first appeared as the third track on Kind of Blue, where it was credited exclusively to Miles Davis. Here, it's co-credited to Davis and Evans. The pianist said that "it's my tune, even though Miles is credited ... for reasons only he understands. One day at Miles's apartment he wrote on some manuscript paper the symbols for G-minor and A-augmented. And he said, 'What would you do with that?' I didn't know, but I went home and wrote 'Blue in Green.'"

Portrait in Jazz is one of Evans's more up-tempo and swinging albums, the presence of several ballads notwithstanding.

== Reception ==
Professional ratings
Review scores
Source	Rating
DownBeat	5/5 stars
AllMusic	4.5/5 stars
Mojo	(no rating)
Encyclopedia of Popular Music	5/5 stars
Tom Hull	A−
Jazzwise	5/5 stars
The Penguin Guide to Jazz Recordings	4/4 stars

Reviewing the album for AllMusic, critic Scott Yanow wrote, "the influential interpretations were far from routine or predictable at the time. LaFaro and Motian were nearly equal partners with the pianist in the ensembles .... A gem." Danny Eccleston of Mojo commented, "Portrait In Jazz—Evans' fifth record as a band leader—gets you every which way. At its least great, it is merely brilliant .... But what makes Evans extra-extra-special is the way his playing drags you in and shares the vulnerability at its core. Oh, the humanity!"

Evans biographer Peter Pettinger says that "the plateau attained on Portrait was high indeed, its fresh vistas possessed of a new subtlety in the execution." He also singles out the performance of "Spring Is Here" by Richard Rodgers as "a magnificent example of [Evans's] lyrical touch." Shadwick refers to the album as establishing "the blueprint for every subsequent working trio that Evans would run."

== Reissues ==
Portrait in Jazz was released on compact disc in 1987 by Riverside/Original Jazz Classics with both masters (mono and stereo) of "Autumn Leaves" and take 2 of "Blue In Green." In 2008, a 24-bit remastered edition was released by Riverside as part of its "Keepnews Collection."

== Track listing ==
Side one

1. "Come Rain or Come Shine" (Harold Arlen, Johnny Mercer) – 3:24
2. "Autumn Leaves" (Joseph Kosma, Jacques Prévert, Johnny Mercer) – 6:00
3. "Witchcraft" (Cy Coleman, Carolyn Leigh) – 4:37
4. "When I Fall in Love" (Victor Young, Edward Heyman) – 4:57
5. "Peri's Scope" (Bill Evans) – 3:15

Side two

1. "What Is This Thing Called Love?" (Cole Porter) – 4:36
2. "Spring Is Here" (Richard Rodgers, Lorenz Hart) – 5:09
3. "Someday My Prince Will Come" (Frank Churchill, Larry Morey) – 4:57
4. "Blue in Green" (Miles Davis, Bill Evans) – 5:25

Bonus tracks on 2008 CD reissue:

10. "Come Rain or Come Shine" [Take 4] - 3:23
11. "Autumn Leaves" [Take 9, mono] - 5:25
12. "Blue in Green" [Take 1] – 4:39
13. "Blue in Green" [Take 2] – 4:26

== Personnel ==
- Bill Evans – piano
- Scott LaFaro – bass
- Paul Motian – drums

=== Additional personnel ===
- Orrin Keepnews – producer
- Jack Higgins – engineer
- George Horn – mastering
