= Waltz for Debby (1962 album) =

Live album by the Bill Evans Trio
- Released: End of February/Early March 1962
- Recorded: June 25, 1961
- Venue: Village Vanguard, New York City
- Genre: Cool jazz
- Length: 38:29
- Label: Riverside
- Producer: Orrin Keepnews

Bill Evans chronology
Sunday at the Village Vanguard (1961)	Waltz for Debby (1962)	Undercurrent (1962)

Waltz for Debby is a live album by jazz pianist and composer Bill Evans and his trio consisting of Evans, bassist Scott LaFaro, and drummer Paul Motian. It was released in 1962.

== History ==
The album was the fourth and final effort from the unit—LaFaro died in a car accident just ten days after the live date at the Village Vanguard from which Waltz for Debby and its predecessor, Sunday at the Village Vanguard, were taken. The loss of LaFaro hit Evans hard, and he went into a brief reclusion. When Evans returned to the trio format later in 1962, it was with Motian and bassist Chuck Israels.

The title track, a musical portrait of Evans' niece, became a staple of his live repertoire in later years. It originally appeared as a solo piano piece on Evans' debut album, New Jazz Conceptions. It remains what is likely Evans' most well-known song, one that he would play throughout his career.

The CD reissue of the album contains several outtakes. The entire day's recordings were released in 2005 as The Complete Village Vanguard Recordings, 1961.

== Reception ==
Professional ratings
Review scores
Source	Rating
All About Jazz	5/5 stars
AllMusic	5/5 stars
DownBeat	4/5 stars
The Encyclopedia of Popular Music	5/5 stars
The Penguin Guide to Jazz	👑
The Rolling Stone Jazz Record Guide	5/5 stars

The album is widely considered to be one of the best in the Evans canon, and the type of emotive interplay between the musicians that at some points seemed almost deconstructed has served as a model for piano trio play.

AllMusic critic Thom Jurek wrote: "While the Sunday at the Village Vanguard album focused on material where LaFaro soloed prominently, this is far more a portrait of the trio on those dates... Of the many recordings Evans issued, the two Vanguard dates and Explorations are the ultimate expressions of his legendary trio." C. Michael Bailey of All About Jazz wrote: "Along with Bassist wunderkind Scott LaFaro and drummer Paul Motian, Evans perfected his democratic vision of trio cooperation, where all members performed with perfect empathy and telepathy... It is these performances, currently available as Sunday at The Village Vanguard and Waltz for Debby that comprise the number one best jazz live recording in this present series."

It was voted number 465 in the third edition of Colin Larkin's All Time Top 1000 Albums (2000).

== Track listing ==
=== LP track listing ===
Side one

1. "My Foolish Heart" (Victor Young, Ned Washington) – 4:58
2. "Waltz for Debby" [Take 2] (Bill Evans, Gene Lees) – 7:00
3. "Detour Ahead" [Take 2] (Lou Carter, Herb Ellis, Johnny Frigo) – 7:37

Side two

1. "My Romance" [Take 1] (Richard Rodgers, Lorenz Hart) – 7:13
2. "Some Other Time" (Leonard Bernstein, Betty Comden, Adolph Green) – 5:11
3. "Milestones" (Miles Davis) – 6:30

=== CD track listing ===
1. "My Foolish Heart" 4:56
2. "Waltz for Debby" [Take 2] 7:00
3. "Waltz for Debby" [Take 1] 6:46
4. "Detour Ahead" [Take 2] 7:37
5. "Detour Ahead" [Take 1] 7:13
6. "My Romance" [Take 1] 7:12
7. "My Romance" [Take 2] 7:15
8. "Some Other Time" 5:11
9. "Milestones" 6:30
10. "Porgy (I Loves You, Porgy)" 5:58
- Note on the alternate takes: "For this CD release, alternate versions of three of the six selections have been inserted just after the ones originally chosen for issuance.[...] The three not duplicated here were played only once that day. Also included is "Porgy", originally omitted for lack of space.[...]" (Orrin Keepnews excerpt from the booklet)

== Personnel ==
- Bill Evans – piano
- Scott LaFaro – bass
- Paul Motian – drums
