= The Last Waltz: The Final Recordings =

Live album by Bill Evans
- Released: 2000
- Recorded: August 31, September 1–8, 1980
- Genre: Jazz
- Label: Milestone
- Producer: Todd Barkan

Bill Evans chronology
Homecoming (1999)	The Last Waltz: The Final Recordings (2000)	Tenderly: An Informal Session (2001)

The Last Waltz: The Final Recordings is an 8-CD box set live album by jazz pianist Bill Evans with Marc Johnson and Joe LaBarbera recorded during a nine night residency at Keystone Korner in San Francisco in 1980 and released on the Milestone label in 2000. Additional recordings from this concert series were released as Consecration: The Final Recordings Part 2 released in 2002.

== Reception ==
The Allmusic review by Richard S. Ginell awarded the album 4½ stars and stated "This set confirms what Warner Bros. Turn Out The Stars box - recorded three months before - indicated, that Evans' last months on this planet produced a lot of prime vintage music, even though the pianist was merely reprising and refining a direction that had been set in stone long before". The All About Jazz review by Mark Corroto stated "The then unauthorized taping is of good quality, and for fans of the great one these recordings remind us of the beauty that the tragedy of living is".

Professional ratings
Review scores
Source	Rating
Allmusic	4.5/5 stars
The Penguin Guide to Jazz Recordings	3/4 stars

== Track listing ==
All compositions by Bill Evans except as indicated

Disc One:

1. "After You, Who?" (Cole Porter) - 2:41
2. "Like Someone in Love" (Johnny Burke, Jimmy Van Heusen) - 6:56
3. "Polka Dots and Moonbeams" (Burke, Van Heusen) - 7:03
4. "Emily" (Johnny Mandel, Johnny Mercer) - 5:43
5. "Turn Out the Stars" - 9:14
6. "I Do It for Your Love" (Paul Simon) - 6:33
7. "Nardis" (Miles Davis) - 7:18
8. "But Beautiful" (Burke, Van Heusen) - 4:49

Disc Two:

1. "Peau Douce" (Steve Swallow) (mistitled as Yet Ne'er Broken in the track listing) - 6:40
2. "Knit for Mary F." - 7:03
3. "The Touch of Your Lips" (Ray Noble) - 5:29
4. "My Man's Gone Now" (George Gershwin, Ira Gershwin, Dubose Heyward) - 6:52
5. "Turn Out the Stars" - 6:31
6. "Your Story" - 5:12
7. "Nardis" (Davis) - 17:41

Disc Three:

1. "Peau Douce" (Swallow) - 5:43
2. "Yet Ne'er Broken" - 6:08
3. "My Foolish Heart" (Ned Washington, Victor Young) - 5:13
4. "Up With the Lark" (Jerome Kern, Leo Robin) - 5:52
5. "Turn Out the Stars" - 8:01
6. "I Do It for Your Love" (Simon) - 6:07
7. "Nardis" (Davis) - 15:55
8. "Noelle's Theme/I Loves You, Porgy" (Michel Legrand/Gershwin, Gershwin, Heyward) - 7:30

Disc Four:

1. "Yet Ne'er Broken" - 6:06
2. "Spring Is Here" (Lorenz Hart, Richard Rodgers) - 4:16
3. "Who Can I Turn To (When Nobody Needs Me)" (Leslie Bricusse, Anthony Newley) - 5:59
4. "Letter to Evan" - 6:44
5. "If You Could See Me Now" (Tadd Dameron, Carl Sigman) - 5:28
6. "The Two Lonely People" (Evans, Carol Hall) - 6:43
7. "A Sleepin' Bee" (Harold Arlen, Truman Capote) - 5:18
8. "Haunted Heart" (Howard Dietz, Arthur Schwartz) - 4:49
9. "Five" - 4:19

Disc Five:

1. "Re: Person I Knew" - 4:02
2. "Tiffany" - 5:36
3. "Polka Dots and Moonbeams" (Burke, Van Heusen) - 6:16
4. "Like Someone in Love" (Burke, Van Heusen) - 7:02
5. "Your Story" - 4:26
6. "Someday My Prince Will Come" (Frank Churchill, Larry Morey) - 7:05
7. "Letter to Evan" - 6:28
8. "My Romance" (Hart, Rodgers) - 9:15
9. "But Beautiful" (Burke, Van Heusen) - 4:03

Disc Six:

1. "Mornin' Glory" (Bobbie Gentry) - 3:59
2. "Emily" (Mandel, Mercer) - 4:59
3. "Knit for Mary F." - 6:25
4. "Days of Wine and Roses " (Henry Mancini, Johnny Mercer) - 7:46
5. "Up With the Lark" (Kern, Robin) - 5:19
6. "My Foolish Heart" (Washington, Young) - 4:17
7. "Nardis" (Davis) - 15:17
8. "But Beautiful" (Burke, Van Heusen) - 3:50

Disc Seven:

1. "My Foolish Heart" (Washington, Young) - 4:03
2. "Nardis" (Davis) - 17:47
3. "Mother of Earl" (Earl Zindars) - 5:04
4. "If You Could See Me Now" (Dameron, Sigman) - 5:49
5. "My Man's Gone Now" (Gershwin, Gershwin, Heyward) - 4:36
6. "Who Can I Turn To (When Nobody Needs Me)" (Bricusse, Newley) - 6:05
7. "Waltz for Debby (Evans, Gene Lees)- 6:20
8. "Spring Is Here" (Hart, Rodgers) - 3:51
9. "Five" - 3:53

Disc Eight:

1. "Letter to Evan" - 8:07
2. "My Man's Gone Now" (Gershwin, Gershwin, Heyward)- 6:27
3. "34 Skidoo" - 6:27
4. "Spring Is Here"(Hart, Rodgers) - 4:43
5. "Autumn Leaves" (Joseph Kosma, Jacques Prévert, Johnny Mercer)- 5:39
6. "Knit for Mary F." - 6:31
7. "Nardis" (Davis) - 19:35

- Recorded at Keystone Korner, San Francisco on August 31 (disc 1), September 1 (disc 2), September 2 & 3 (disc 3 & 4), September 4 (disc 5), September 5 & 6, (disc 6), September 7 (disc 7), and September 8 (disc 8), 1980.

== Personnel ==
- Bill Evans - piano
- Marc Johnson - bass
- Joe LaBarbera - drums
