= Waltz for Debby =

Waltz for Debby is the name of:

- "Waltz for Debby" (song), a 1956 jazz composition by Bill Evans later made into a song
- Waltz for Debby (1962 album), album by Bill Evans
- Waltz for Debby (1964 album), album by Monica Zetterlund and Bill Evans
