= Nardis (composition) =

Miles Davis' 1958 composition

"Nardis" is a composition by American jazz trumpeter Miles Davis. It was written in 1958, during Davis's modal period, to be played by Cannonball Adderley for the album Portrait of Cannonball. The piece has come to be closely associated with pianist Bill Evans, who performed and recorded it many times throughout his career.

== Composition and the original recording ==
First eight measures of Nardis

From 1955 to 1958, Miles Davis was leading what would come to be called his First Great Quintet. By 1958, the group consisted of John Coltrane on tenor saxophone, Red Garland on piano, Paul Chambers on bass, and Philly Joe Jones on drums, and had just been expanded to a sextet with the addition of Cannonball Adderley on alto saxophone.

Coltrane's return to Davis’s group in 1958 coincided with the "modal phase" albums: Milestones (1958) and Kind of Blue (1959) are both considered essential examples of 1950s modern jazz. Davis at this point was experimenting with modes—i.e., scale patterns other than major and minor.

In mid-1958, Bill Evans replaced Garland on piano and Jimmy Cobb replaced Jones on drums, but Evans, too, left after eight months, replaced by Wynton Kelly in late 1958. This group backing Davis, Coltrane, and Adderley, with Evans returning for the recording sessions, would make Kind of Blue, often considered the greatest jazz album of all time. Adderley left the band in September 1959 to lead his own group, returning the line-up to a quintet.

In July 1958, Evans appeared as a sideman on Adderley's album Portrait of Cannonball, which featured the first performance of "Nardis", specially written by Davis for the session. While Davis was not very satisfied with the overall performance, he said that Evans was the only one to play it in the way he wanted. The piece would come to be associated with Evans's future trios, which played it frequently.

[We're gonna] finish up featuring everyone in the trio with a Miles Davis number that's come to be associated with our group, because no one else seemed to pick up on it after it was written for a Cannonball date I did with Cannonball in 1958—he asked Miles to write a tune for the date [the album Portrait of Cannonball], and Miles came up with this tune; and it was kind of a new type of sound to contend with. It was a very modal sound. And I picked up on it, but nobody else did. ... The tune is called "Nardis."

— Interview at Ilkka Kuusisto's home, ca.1970, Bill Evans

The use of the Phrygian mode and the double harmonic scale in this tune is also present in other "Spanish" works from those years, notably Davis's Sketches of Spain.

Davis never recorded "Nardis", and Adderley only did on that one occasion.

== Later Bill Evans recordings ==
"Nardis" became an integral part of Evans' repertoire, and it appears on many of his albums: Trio at Birdland (1960), Explorations (1961), The Solo Sessions, Vol. 1 (1963), Trio Live (1964), Bill Evans at the Montreux Jazz Festival (1968), Quiet Now (1969), You're Gonna Hear from Me (1969), Live at the Festival with Tony Oxley (1972), The Paris Concert: Edition Two (1979), Turn Out the Stars: The Final Village Vanguard Recordings (1980, four versions), and The Last Waltz: The Final Recordings (1980, six versions), among others. It also appears on many of Evans' filmed appearances.

According to Evans biographer Peter Pettinger, it was during the late 60s that the pianist's "performances of 'Nardis' began to assume marathon proportions: twenty-minute interpretations were a nightly event, centered around Jack DeJohnette's thrilling solo." With his final trio, featuring bassist Marc Johnson and drummer Joe LaBarbera, which is most closely associated with this piece, Evans considered "Nardis" to be "therapy for each of them" and "almost wished they could line up twenty or so of these 'Nardis' performances and put out a four-album set."

Guitarist John McLaughlin recalled hearing a version of the piece at the Village Vanguard near the end of Evans' life "during which Bill played the most phenomenal introduction ... followed by a rendition that had Dave Liebman and myself jaw-dropping." The Evans version from Montreux was later sampled by Madlib on the Madvillainy track "Raid" (2004).

== Form ==
The melody of Nardis makes use harmonically and melodically of the Phrygian dominant scale and the minor Gypsy scale (technically known as the double harmonic scale), and it is set in thirty-two-bar AABA form. Bill Evans usually played his solo on the piece in E minor (pentatonic and phrygian).

Chords in Nardis as played by Bill Evans
Section	Harmony							
A _{(mm.1-8)}	Em^{7}	Em^{7} Fmaj^{7}	B^{7}	Cmaj^{7}	Am^{7}	Fmaj^{7}	Emaj^{7}	Em^{7}
A _{(Mm.9-16)}	Em^{7}	Em^{7} Fmaj^{7}	B^{7}	Cmaj^{7}	Am^{7}	Fmaj^{7}	Emaj^{7}	Em^{7}
B _{(Mm.17-24)}	Am^{6}	Fmaj^{7}	Am^{6}	Fmaj^{7}	Dm^{7}	Dm^{7} G^{7}	Cmaj^{7}	Fmaj^{7}
A _{(Mm.25-32)}	Em^{7}	Em^{7} Fmaj^{7}	B^{7}	Cmaj^{7}	Am^{7}	Fmaj^{7}	Emaj^{7} Em^{7}	(B^{7})

== Title and authorship ==
The title of the piece has remained something of a mystery. According to jazz critic Ted Gioia, a "third-hand account" has it that Davis overheard "a fan requesting a song from an uncooperative Bill Evans, who allegedly replied, 'I don't play that crap ... I'm an artist.' Add a slight New Jersey accent to that last phrase, and you arrive at something similar to 'n'ardis.' Until a better hypothesis comes to light, this one will have to do."

Drummer Joe LaBarbera notes, "Throughout his career, Bill played ['Nardis'] so often and so well that many have assumed he composed it despite his consistent denial of authorship." And it is true that Evans was not shy about claiming the authorship of "Blue in Green". Nonetheless, pianist Richie Beirach, who recorded "Nardis" himself, has made a case for Evans' authorship, noting that it's a more sophisticated piece than Davis usually wrote, that it seems to be a pianist's piece, that its compositional principles resemble those of other pieces by Evans, that Davis never recorded it, and that Evans played it throughout his career. Beirach admitted, though, that his argument is largely based on a "gut feeling", speculated that possibly Evans gave Davis the publishing rights as part of "some business arrangement", and concluded that "regardless of who wrote 'Nardis', it's a lifelong gift to all of us."

== Other notable recordings ==
- George Russell Sextet, Ezz-thetics (1961)
- Neal Ardley's New Jazz Orchestra included an arrangement by Ian Carr on the British jazz album Le Déjeuner sur l'Herbe (1969).
- Richie Beirach, Eon (1974) and Elegy for Bill Evans (1981)
- The Great Jazz Trio (Hank Jones, piano; Ron Carter, bass; Tony Williams, drums), The Great Jazz Trio at the Village Vanguard Vol. 2 (1977)
- Jeremy Steig and Eddie Gomez on the album Outlaws (1977)
- Richard Davis with Joe Henderson, Fancy Free (1977)
- Ralph Towner, Solo Concert (1979)
- The Kronos Quartet with bassist Eddie Gómez, Music of Bill Evans (1986)
- Pianist Fred Hersch recorded "Nardis" in medley format with Ornette Coleman's "Lonely Woman" on two albums: Evanessence: A Tribute to Bill Evans (1990) and Alive at the Vanguard (2012).
- Jacky Terrasson, Smile (2002)
- Madlib sampled a rendition of "Nardis" by the Bill Evans Trio in producing the song Raid from the album Madvillainy.
- The John Abercrombie Quartet, Up and Coming (2016)
- Marc Johnson included the composition in his solo 2022 album Overpass.
- Marcin Patrzalek's 2024 album "Dragon in Harmony" included an arrangement.

== Books ==
- Pettinger, Peter (2002) [1999]. Bill Evans: How My Heart Sings (New ed.). Yale University Press. ISBN 0-300-09727-1.
