= The Paris Concert: Edition One =

Live album by Bill Evans
- Released: 1983
- Recorded: November 26, 1979
- Venue: L'Espace Cardin, Paris
- Genre: Jazz
- Length: 53:00
- Label: Elektra/Musician; 60164
- Producer: Helen Keane

Bill Evans chronology
We Will Meet Again (1979)	The Paris Concert: Edition One (1983)	The Paris Concert: Edition Two (1979)

The Paris Concert: Edition One is a live album by jazz pianist Bill Evans with bassist Marc Johnson and drummer Joe LaBarbera recorded in Paris, France, in 1979 and originally released on the Elektra/Musician label. Additional recordings from this concert were released as The Paris Concert: Edition Two.

== Background ==
At the time of this concert, Evans' final piano trio had been together for about 10 months. LaBarbera felt that during its prior U.S. tour, the new trio had really started to "gel" and that the Paris concert "was spectacular." It was performed before a sold-out crowd at L'Espace Cardin, a 600-plus-seat theater, where Evans was delighted with the excellent piano. "The night in Paris was effortless," LaBarbera recalled. "Bill was on, and the audience just loved it. The kind of energy you get from a full house like that is just unbelievable. It spurs you on."

LaBarbera also noted that there was no set list for the trio's concerts. "Bill started every tune at the piano and set the tempo accordingly. Our chemistry was so firm that when Bill merely laid his hands on the piano and voiced a chord, we knew the song and where he was headed."

The concert was taped by Radio France, and after American record company executive Bruce Lundvall heard the recordings in 1982, two years after Evans' death, he was "so moved by the level of performance" that he "was determined to obtain the rights" to release them. Evans' former manager, Helen Keane, felt "certain Bill would be tremendously pleased to have these recordings released." As Evans biographer Peter Pettinger notes, Keane "did indeed have the final word on what went out, and her cachet meant that Evans would be happy."

== Repertoire ==
Edition One includes eight songs, none of which were new to Evans' discography. As Evans biographer Keith Shadwick observed, in this repertoire, "virtually every phase of his career as a leader was represented." Two of the numbers, Paul Simon's "I Do It for Your Love" and Michel Legrand's "Noelle's Theme" (aka "The Other Side of Midnight"), were recent additions and had been recorded by Evans the previous year for the album Affinity with Toots Thielemans. Here, Evans takes "Noelle's Theme" as a solo feature, along with George Gershwin's "I Loves You, Porgy," which Evans had previously recorded several times, notably live at the Village Vanguard in 1961 and on the 1968 album Bill Evans at the Montreux Jazz Festival. LaBarbera noted that the solo performances were his "favorite moments" of the concert.

Denny Zeitlin's "Quiet Now" was an Evans specialty, first appearing on the album Further Conversations with Myself (1967), as was Richard Rodgers' "My Romance," which the pianist first recorded on his debut album. "Up with the Lark" and "Minha (All Mine)" had been added to Evans' repertoire earlier in the 1970s, whereas Victor Young's standard "Beautiful Love" reached further back in Evans' discography, to the classic 1961 trio album Explorations.

As Burt Korall noted, this older repertoire was given a fresh and dynamic treatment in the concert: Evans "more freely manipulated rhythmic sequences [and] experimented with sonorities, moving with far less inhibition than in the early years. He seemed far less fearful of making mistakes or failing. The playing seemed to say, 'Let's do it!'"

== Reception ==
Pettinger notes that the Paris concert recordings "have long been acclaimed as among the finest from the Bill Evans Trio" and that Edition One was voted best album of the year by the Association of French Jazz Critics. Shadwick calls the performance "inspired," praising the contributions of all three players, who "achieved a rare degree of unity in ensemble, accompaniment and solo settings."

The AllMusic review by Scott Yanow awarded the album 4½ stars and states, "Evans had one of the strongest trios of his career. ... The close communication between the players is reminiscent of Evans' 1961 unit with Scott LaFaro and Paul Motian."

Professional ratings
Review scores
Source	Rating
AllMusic	4.5/5 stars
The Rolling Stone Jazz Record Guide	4/5 stars
The Penguin Guide to Jazz Recordings	3.5/4 stars

== Track listing ==
1. "I Do It for Your Love" (Paul Simon) - 6:18
2. "Quiet Now" (Denny Zeitlin) - 5:55
3. "Noelle's Theme" (aka "The Other Side of Midnight") (Michel Legrand) - 4:20
4. "My Romance" (Lorenz Hart, Richard Rodgers) - 9:15
5. "I Loves You, Porgy" (George Gershwin, Ira Gershwin, DuBose Heyward) - 7:02
6. "Up With the Lark" (Jerome Kern, Leo Robin) - 6:41
7. "All Mine (Minha)" (Ruy Guerra, Francis Hime) - 4:05
8. "Beautiful Love" (Haven Gillespie, Wayne King, Egbert Van Alstyne, Victor Young) - 9:24

== Personnel ==
- Bill Evans - piano
- Marc Johnson - bass (except tracks 3 & 5)
- Joe LaBarbera - drums (except tracks 3 & 5)
