= The Paris Concert =

The Paris Concert may refer to:

- The Paris Concert (John Coltrane album), 1963
- The Paris Concert (Oscar Peterson album), 1978
- The Paris Concert: Edition One, a 1980 album by Bill Evans
- The Paris Concert: Edition Two, a 1980 album by Bill Evans
