= Know What I Mean? =

Studio album by Cannonball Adderley with Bill Evans
- Released: October/November 1962
- Recorded: January 27, February 21, March 13, 1961
- Studio: Bell Sound (New York City)
- Genre: Soul jazz Hard bop
- Length: 53:00
- Label: Riverside; RLP-433
- Producer: Orrin Keepnews

Cannonball Adderley chronology
The Cannonball Adderley Quintet at the Lighthouse (1960)	Know What I Mean? (1962)	African Waltz (1961)

Know What I Mean? is a 1962 jazz album by alto saxophonist Julian "Cannonball" Adderley, accompanied by Bill Evans and the rhythm section of the Modern Jazz Quartet. It was released on the Riverside label as RLP-433.

== Background ==
Adderley and Evans had recorded previously both with the Miles Davis Sextet—most notably on Kind of Blue—and on two of Adderley's earlier recordings as a leader, Portrait of Cannonball and Jump for Joy. Adderley had previously recorded several times with bassist Percy Heath but not with drummer Connie Kay. Evans had recorded previously with both rhythm players several times, including on John Lewis's film soundtrack for Odds Against Tomorrow.

Know What I Mean? was recorded in three sessions, both immediately preceding and following the recording of Evans's trio album Explorations. The two albums share recordings of one piece, the ballad-waltz "Elsa" by Evans's friend Earl Zindars. This album also includes several notable jazz standards, a short interpretation of Lewis's piece "Venice" from the soundtrack to the film No Sun in Venice, the second recording ever made of what would become Evans's most famous composition, "Waltz for Debby," and a new Evans original, the title track, which producer Orrin Keepnews "christened ... after one of Adderley's conversational signatures."

Evans biographer Peter Pettinger notes that Adderley "wanted to make an album that would break away from his own popular soul style" and that "the concept was built around his friend Bill Evans," who served as arranger for these sessions.

Barely noticeable on the album cover is a small picture of Evans, directly underneath the sculpture (from the Bertha Schaefer Gallery) to Adderley's right.

== Reception ==
Professional ratings
Review scores
Source	Rating
AllMusic	4/5 stars
DownBeat	3.5/5 stars
The Penguin Guide to Jazz	3/4 stars
Record Mirror	4/5 stars
The Rolling Stone Jazz Record Guide	3/5 stars

The AllMusic review by Rick Anderson stated: "It's hard to imagine any fan of mainstream jazz not finding much to love on this very fine recording." The Penguin Guide to Jazz awarded the album 3 stars out of 4, stating: "The quartet date with Bill Evans was one of the last chances to hear [Adderley] as sole horn, and he sounds fine."

Keith Shadwick notes that the album "presented Adderley in an unusually lush and reserved but sympathetic setting that brings out most positively his deep appreciation of Benny Carter's playing, especially on the ballads. Evans's own playing across the three dates is relaxed and expansive."

== Reissues ==
The album was digitally remastered and released on compact disc by Riverside and Original Jazz Classics in 1987 with two bonus tracks, alternate takes of Gershwin's "Who Cares?" and Evans's title track. A 20-bit remastered edition followed in 2000 and then a new edition in 2011 with an alternate take of Clifford Jordan's "Toy," which completes the extant recordings from these sessions.

== Track listing ==
1. "Waltz for Debby" (Bill Evans, Gene Lees) – 5:15
2. "Goodbye" (Gordon Jenkins) – 6:15
3. "Who Cares?" (Take 5) (George Gershwin, Ira Gershwin) – 5:57
4. "Venice" (John Lewis) – 2:55
5. "Toy" (Clifford Jordan) – 5:09
6. "Elsa" (Earl Zindars) – 5:52
7. "Nancy (With the Laughing Face)" (Phil Silvers, Jimmy Van Heusen) – 4:08
8. "Know What I Mean?" (Re-take 7) (Evans) – 4:54
9. "Who Cares?" (Take 4) – 5:55
10. "Know What I Mean?" (Take 12) – 7:01

Tracks 2–3, 7, 9–10 recorded on January 27, 1961; tracks 5 & 6 on February 21; tracks 1, 4 & 8 recorded on March 13, 1961, all at Bell Sound Studios, New York City.

== Personnel ==
- Cannonball Adderley - alto saxophone
- Bill Evans - piano and arranger
- Percy Heath - acoustic bass
- Connie Kay - drums

== Production staff ==
- Bill Stoddard - recording engineer
- Ken Deardoff - album design
