= Everybody Digs Bill Evans =

1959 studio album by Bill Evans

Studio album by Bill Evans
- Released: March 1959
- Recorded: December 15, 1958
- Studios: Reeves Sound, New York City
- Genre: Jazz
- Length: 42:36
- Labels: Riverside; RLP 12-291
- Producer: Orrin Keepnews

Bill Evans chronology
New Jazz Conceptions (1956)	Everybody Digs Bill Evans (1959)	On Green Dolphin Street (1959)

Everybody Digs Bill Evans is a trio and solo album by the jazz pianist Bill Evans. It was released in early 1959 on the Riverside Records label.

== Background ==
Everybody Digs Bill Evans was Evans's second album as a leader and 30th recording project overall, completed 27 months after his first record as a leader, New Jazz Conceptions (1956). Orrin Keepnews had wanted Evans to record a follow-up album to his debut sooner, but the self-critical pianist "resolutely refused to consider himself ready for another effort on his own" before this album.

Keepnews offered a vivid portrait of the pianist at this time: "a bespectacled blond, extremely reserved and mild-mannered .... He is probably the only man I can think of whose head would not have been completely turned and swelled by the sort of things jazz insiders have been saying about him of late."

The recording captures Evans at a time when he frequently played extended musical ideas using block chords, a technique also favored by Milt Buckner, George Shearing, and other jazz pianists. Thinking of formative influences on Evans, Keepnews compared his sound here by contrast with his first effort as follows: "I hear much less Bud Powell than before, somewhat less Horace Silver, a little more Lennie Tristano, and about as much Nat Cole."

The album includes six trio recordings, four jazz standards plus two modern jazz classics, Gigi Gryce's "Minority" and Sonny Rollins's "Oleo". It also features Evans playing solo on Leonard Bernstein's "Lucky to Be Me" and the pianist's own compositions, "Peace Piece" and "Epilogue". The bonus track from this session, another Bernstein tune, "Some Other Time", is also taken solo.

Although Evans had quit Miles Davis's prestigious band two months before the album was recorded, Davis was sufficiently enamored of Evans's piano sound that he decided to use him as the pianist for four of the five tracks on the classic 1959 recording Kind of Blue, recorded just a few months after this album.

Reflecting back on Everybody Digs Bill Evans in 1975, the pianist said:

I've always felt pretty good about that record, because I know there was a strong feeling to it, and that's the hardest thing about recording to begin with. You know, you go in at a certain time on a certain day, and you hope you're going to have that kind of peak. No matter what happens, you play, you do a job, and to most listeners it probably doesn't make that much difference. However, when you do have that special day, it penetrates—I mean this album has gotten a certain kind of reaction from people through the years; it seems to have a lot to do with that very special feeling I had then.

== Cover ==
The cover of the album features tribute quotations from some of Evans's most esteemed contemporaries:

I've sure learned a lot from Bill Evans. He plays the piano the way it should be played.—Miles Davis

Bill Evans is one of the most refreshing pianists I have heard in years.—George Shearing

I think Bill Evans is one of the finest.—Ahmad Jamal

Bill Evans has rare originality and taste and the even rarer ability to make his conception of a number seem the definitive way to play it.—Cannonball Adderley

Evans quipped to his producer, Orrin Keepnews, "Why didn't you get a quote from my mother?"

== Reception ==
Professional ratings
Review scores
Source	Rating
All About Jazz	4.5/5 stars
AllMusic	4/5 stars
The Rolling Stone Jazz Record Guide	4/5 stars
Encyclopedia of Popular Music	5/5 stars
The Penguin Guide to Jazz Recordings	4/4 stars

After its release, the album received rave reviews from DownBeat, The Jazz Review, McCall's, and other publications.

Retrospective reviews have been similarly positive. Writing for AllMusic, music critic Michael G. Nastos called the album "a landmark recording for the young pianist .... Evans was emerging not only as an ultra-sensitive player, but as an interpreter of standards second to none. ... Though not his very best effort overall, Evans garnered great attention, and rightfully so, from this important album of 1958."

Samuel Chell of All About Jazz wrote: "With its varied tempos, rhythms and programming, Everybody Digs Bill Evans sustains interest without allowing the listener for a moment to mistake the singular, inimitable voice of the leader. It's not hard to understand why many Evans followers, 'casual' and otherwise, list it as their favorite of the pianist's recordings. It's doubtful there's a more introspective, meditative trio set on record, yet the pianist shows he can dance as well."

Much of the critical attention the album has received over the years has focused on the famous solo "Peace Piece", which has been compared to classical works by Chopin, Debussy, Satie, Scriabin, Ravel, and Messiaen and has been recorded by classical musicians, including the Kronos Quartet (1985), Jean-Yves Thibaudet (1996), Roy Eaton (2011), and Igor Levit (2018).

Everybody Digs Bill Evans was voted number 3 in the 50 All-Time Overlooked Jazz Albums from Colin Larkin's All Time Top 1000 Albums.

== Reissues ==
The album was released on CD in 1987 with one bonus track and reissued as part of the "Keepnews Collection" with 24 bit remastering and a new essay by the producer in 2007. A new mono vinyl edition was released in 2024 for Record Store Day.

== Track listing ==
Side one

1. "Minority" (Gigi Gryce) – 5:20
2. "Young and Foolish" (Albert Hague, Arnold B. Horwitt) – 5:48
3. "Lucky to Be Me" (Leonard Bernstein, Betty Comden, Adolph Green) – 3:35
4. "Night and Day" (Cole Porter) – 7:12
5. "Epilogue" (Bill Evans) – 0:38

Side two

1. "Tenderly" (Walter Gross) – 3:29
2. "Peace Piece" (Bill Evans) – 6:37
3. "What Is There to Say?" (Vernon Duke, Yip Harburg) – 4:49
4. "Oleo" (Sonny Rollins) – 4:04
5. "Epilogue" (Bill Evans) – 0:38

Bonus track:

11. "Some Other Time" (Leonard Bernstein, Betty Comden, Adolph Green) – 6:09

== Personnel ==
- Bill Evans – piano
- Sam Jones – bass (tracks 1, 2, 4, 5, 7, & 8)
- Philly Joe Jones – drums (tracks 1, 2, 4, 5, 7, & 8)

== Charts ==
=== Weekly charts ===
Chart (2024)	Peak position
Croatian International Albums (HDU)	14
