= The Complete Village Vanguard Recordings, 1961 =

Compilation album by Bill Evans
- Released: 2005
- Recorded: June 25, 1961; Village Vanguard, New York City
- Genre: Jazz
- Label: Riverside; 3RCD-4443-2
- Producer: Orrin Keepnews

Bill Evans chronology
Getting Sentimental (2003)	The Complete Village Vanguard Recordings, 1961 (2005)	The Complete Tony Bennett/Bill Evans Recordings (2009)

The Complete Village Vanguard Recordings, 1961, a three-CD box set released in 2005, is the first release of the entire Bill Evans Trio's complete sets at the Village Vanguard on June 25, 1961 (outside of the 12-disc set containing Evans' complete Riverside recordings). It is also the first U.S. release of the first take of "Gloria's Step," which is incomplete due to a power failure.

These sets, from which the classic LPs Sunday at the Village Vanguard and Waltz for Debby were drawn, were the trio's final live recordings. Bassist Scott LaFaro died in an automobile accident just 11 days later, on July 6.

The album was deemed by the Library of Congress to be "culturally, historically, or aesthetically important" and added to the National Recording Registry in 2009. The Penguin Guide to Jazz Recordings included the set as part of its suggested "core collection".

== Critical response ==
Professional ratings
Review scores
Source	Rating
All About Jazz	5/5 stars
AllMusic	5/5 stars
The Penguin Guide to Jazz Recordings	4/4 stars

In a classic essay titled "That Sunday" originally published in The New Yorker, Adam Gopnik wrote of this music:

It is easy to cite worshipful jazz-critic passages about [these recordings], concerning intonation and modal passages and singing tones .... It is difficult to explain the force the music does have, since it is not particularly forceful. People who don’t respond to it are puzzled that anyone hears anything in it at all. They say that it sounds like “background music,” or like cocktail music. Philip Larkin, acerbic but sound, said that it had a Pierrot-in-the-moonlight quality, and how you feel about it, perhaps, depends on how you feel about Pierrot in moonlight. As the jazz critic Ira Gitler pointed out in the original liner notes, Evans was at the time an aficionado of Zen Buddhism, and the music he made was meditative and tuneful, between Suzuki and Snow White.

If you are vulnerable to this music, however, you are completely vulnerable to it. Bill Evans has no casual fans. After that afternoon, his name became synonymous with a heartbreak quality that is not like anything else in music. It is not little-boy-lost or blue, like Miles Davis, but transparent and wistful. Evans’s solos on “Alice in Wonderland” and “My Foolish Heart” and, especially, “Porgy” have a mother-of-pearl tone, singing and skipping, as though they were being played on the celesta or xylophone. They are as close to pure emotion, produced without impediments ... as exists in music. His music hints at the secret truth that New York is sad before it is busy, and that it is a kind of inverted garden, with all the flowers blooming down in the basements.

== Track listing ==
=== Disc one ===
==== Afternoon Set 1 ====
1. Spoken introduction
2. "Gloria's Step" (Take 1, interrupted) (Scott LaFaro)
3. "Alice in Wonderland" (Take 1) (Sammy Fain-Bob Hilliard) [Sb]
4. "My Foolish Heart" (Victor Young-Ned Washington) [W]
5. "All of You" (Take 1) (Cole Porter)
6. Announcement and intermission

==== Afternoon Set 2 ====
1. "My Romance" (Take 1) (Richard Rodgers-Lorenz Hart) [W]
2. "Some Other Time" (Leonard Bernstein-Betty Comden-Adolph Green) [W]
3. "Solar" (Miles Davis) [S]

=== Disc two ===
==== Evening Set 1 ====
1. "Gloria's Step" (Take 2) [S]
2. "My Man's Gone Now" (George Gershwin-Ira Gershwin-DuBose Heyward) [S]
3. "All of You" (Take 2) [S]
4. "Detour Ahead" (Take 1) (Lou Carter-Herb Ellis-Johnny Frigo) [Wb]

==== Evening Set 2 ====
1. Discussing repertoire
2. "Waltz for Debby" (Take 1) (Bill Evans-Gene Lees) [Wb]
3. "Alice in Wonderland" (Take 2) [S]
4. "Porgy (I Loves You, Porgy)" (George Gershwin-Ira Gershwin-DuBose Heyward) [Wb]
5. "My Romance" (Take 2) [Wb]
6. "Milestones" (Miles Davis) [W]

=== Disc Three ===
==== Evening Set 3 ====
1. "Detour Ahead" (Take 2) [W]
2. "Gloria's Step" (Take 3) [Sb]
3. "Waltz for Debby" (Take 2) [W]
4. "All of You" (Take 3) [Sb]
5. "Jade Visions" (Take 1) (Scott LaFaro) [Sb]
6. "Jade Visions" (Take 2) [S]
7. ...A few final bars

== Relation to original LPs ==
Tracks marked with [S] were originally released on Sunday at the Village Vanguard. The original running order was:

1. "Gloria's Step" (evening set 1, take 2)
2. "My Man's Gone Now" (evening set 1)
3. "Solar" (afternoon set 2)
4. "Alice in Wonderland" (evening set 2, take 2)
5. "All of You" (evening set 1, take 2)
6. "Jade Visions" (evening set 3, take 2)

In addition, tracks marked with [Sb] were bonus tracks on the CD reissue.

Tracks marked with [W] were originally released on Waltz for Debby. The original running order was:

1. "My Foolish Heart" (afternoon set 1)
2. "Waltz for Debby" (evening set 3, take 2)
3. "Detour Ahead" (evening set 3, take 2)
4. "My Romance" (afternoon set 2, take 1)
5. "Some Other Time" (afternoon set 2)
6. "Milestones" (evening set 2)

In addition, tracks marked with [Wb] were bonus tracks on the CD reissue.

== Personnel ==
- Bill Evans – piano
- Scott LaFaro – bass
- Paul Motian – drums
