= Stratusphunk =

Studio album by George Russell
- Released: January 1961
- Recorded: October 18, 1960
- Genre: Jazz
- Length: 43:05
- Label: Riverside
- Producer: Orrin Keepnews

George Russell chronology
George Russell Sextet at the Five Spot (1960)	Stratusphunk (1961)	George Russell Sextet in K.C. (1961)

Professional ratings
Review scores
Source	Rating
Down Beat	3.5/5 stars
Allmusic	4/5 stars
The Penguin Guide to Jazz Recordings	4/4 stars

Stratusphunk is an album by George Russell originally released on Riverside in January 1961. The album contains performances by Russell with Al Kiger, David Baker, Dave Young, Chuck Israels and Joe Hunt.

The title of the album is a combination of the words “stratosphere” and “funk”, a reference to Russell's interest in the intersection of physics, mathematics, and music.

== Reception ==
The Allmusic review by Scott Yanow states that "Surprisingly, only three of the six selections are Russell originals ("Bent Eagle" was an early effort by Carla Bley), but the leader's influence can be felt in all of the adventurous and slightly unusual yet swinging music".

== Track listing ==
All compositions by George Russell except where noted

1. "Stratusphunk" - 6:08
2. "New Donna" - 8:25
3. "Bent Eagle" (Carla Bley) - 6:16
4. "Kentucky Oysters" (David Baker) - 8:25
5. "Lambskins" (David Lahm) - 7:13
6. "Things New" - 6:55

- Recorded October 18, 1960 in NYC

== Personnel ==
- George Russell: piano, arranger, conductor
- Al Kiger: trumpet
- David Baker: trombone
- Dave Young: tenor saxophone
- Chuck Israels: bass
- Joe Hunt: drums
