= Overpass (disambiguation) =

An overpass or flyover is a bridge carrying one road or railway over another.

Overpass may also refer to:

- Overpass (album), a 2021 jazz studio album by Marc Johnson
- Overpass (film), a 2015 Canadian short film
- "Overpass" (song), from Kitty's 2017 album Miami Garden Club
- Overpass (typeface), a digital typeface based on Highway Gothic
- Overpass (horse), a racehorse
