= Consecration: The Final Recordings Part 2 =

Live album by Bill Evans
- Released: 2002
- Recorded: August 31 & September 1–7, 1980
- Genre: Jazz
- Label: Milestone

Bill Evans chronology
Tenderly: An Informal Session (2001)	Consecration: The Final Recordings Part 2 (2002)	Getting Sentimental (2003)

Consecration: The Final Recordings Part 2 is an 8-CD box set live album by jazz pianist Bill Evans with Marc Johnson and Joe LaBarbera recorded during a nine night residency at Keystone Korner in San Francisco in 1980 and released on the Milestone label in 2002. Additional recordings from this concert series were released as The Last Waltz: The Final Recordings in 2000.

== Reception ==
Thom Jurek of Allmusic stated "there is undeniable evidence that not only was Evans in a state of creative rebirth at the end of his life, but was perhaps at his zenith as a composer, arranger, and—above all—as an improviser".

Professional ratings
Review scores
Source	Rating
Allmusic	4/5 stars
The Penguin Guide to Jazz Recordings	3/4 stars

== Track listing ==
All compositions by Bill Evans except as indicated

Disc One:

1. "Re: Person I Knew" - 5:54
2. "Tiffany" - 5:46
3. "My Foolish Heart" (Ned Washington, Victor Young) - 5:24
4. "Song from M*A*S*H (Suicide Is Painless)" (Mike Altman, Johnny Mandel) - 4:27
5. "Knit for Mary F." - 8:11
6. "Days of Wine and Roses" (Henry Mancini, Johnny Mercer) - 9:42
7. "Your Story" - 5:02
8. "The Two Lonely People" (Evans, Carol Hall) - 8:11
9. "My Romance" (Lorenz Hart, Richard Rodgers) - 11:15

Disc Two:

1. "Tiffany" - 6:19
2. "Polka Dots and Moonbeams" (Johnny Burke, Jimmy Van Heusen) - 7:20
3. "Like Someone in Love (Burke, Van Heusen) - 7:46
4. "Letter to Evan" - 8:59
5. "Gary's Theme" (Gary McFarland) - 7:15
6. "Days of Wine and Roses" (Mancini, Mercer) - 8:36
7. "I Do It for Your Love" (Paul Simon) - 7:01
8. "My Romance" (Hart, Rodgers) - 9:19

Disc Three:

1. "Re: Person I Knew" - 5:04
2. "Tiffany" - 5:50
3. "Knit for Mary F." - 6:44
4. "Like Someone in Love" (Burke, Van Heusen) - 7:12
5. "Your Story" - 4:42
6. "Someday My Prince Will Come" (Frank Churchill, Larry Morey) - 7:20
7. "I Do It for Your Love" (Simon) - 6:18
8. "My Romance" (Hart, Rodgers) - 10:10

Disc Four:

1. "Re: Person I Knew" - 5:06
2. "Tiffany" - 5:56
3. "Polka Dots and Moonbeams" (Burke, Van Heusen) - 7:07
4. "Song from M*A*S*H (Suicide Is Painless)" (Altman, Mandel) - 5:03
5. "Your Story" - 4:43
6. "Like Someone in Love" (Burke, Van Heusen) - 6:48
7. "Knit for Mary F." - 6:51
8. "The Two Lonely People" (Evans, Hall) - 8:23
9. "My Romance" (Hart, Rodgers) - 9:28

Disc Five:

1. "Up With the Lark" (Jerome Kern, Leo Robin) - 7:15
2. "Mornin' Glory" (Bobbie Gentry) - 4:07
3. "Polka Dots and Moonbeams" (Burke, Van Heusen) - 6:38
4. "Like Someone in Love" (Burke, Van Heusen) - 7:21
5. "Turn Out the Stars" - 8:36
6. "Your Story" - 4:36
7. "Emily" (Johnny Mandel, Johnny Mercer) - 5:10
8. "I Do It for Your Love" (Simon) - 6:15
9. "My Romance" (Hart, Rodgers) - 8:57

Disc Six:

1. "Re: Person I Knew" - 4:37
2. "Tiffany" - 5:33
3. "Knit for Mary F." - 6:52
4. "My Foolish Heart" (Washington, Young) - 4:54
5. "Who Can I Turn To (When Nobody Needs Me)" (Leslie Bricusse, Anthony Newley) - 6:20
6. "Emily" (Mandel, Mercer) - 4:48
7. "Laurie" - 8:05
8. "You and the Night and the Music" (Howard Dietz, Arthur Schwartz) - 6:21

Disc Seven:

1. "Re: Person I Knew" - 4:36
2. "Laurie" - 7:02
3. "Bill's Hit Tune" - 7:35
4. "The Two Lonely People" (Evans, Hall) - 7:53
5. "Song from M*A*S*H (Suicide Is Painless)" (Altman, Mandel) - 4:17
6. "My Foolish Heart" (Washington, Young) - 4:13
7. "Days of Wine and Roses" (Mancini, Mercer) - 8:23
8. "But Beautiful" (Burke, Van Heusen) - 3:11

Disc Eight:

1. "Emily" (Mandel, Mercer) - 4:47
2. "Polka Dots and Moonbeams" (Burke, Van Heusen) - 6:17
3. "Like Someone in Love" (Burke, Van Heusen) - 6:51
4. "Your Story" - 4:20
5. "Days of Wine and Roses" (Mancini, Mercer) - 7:55
6. "Knit for Mary F." - 6:27
7. "Who Can I Turn To (When Nobody Needs Me)" (Bricusse, Newley) - 5:01
8. "I Do It for Your Love" (Simon) - 5:46
9. "My Romance" (Hart, Rodgers) - 9:03
  - Recorded at Keystone Korner, San Francisco on August 31 (disc 1), September 1 (disc 2), September 2 (disc 3), September 3 (disc 4), September 4 (disc 5), September 5 (disc 6), September 6 (disc 7), and September 7 (disc 8), 1980.

== Personnel ==
- Bill Evans - piano
- Marc Johnson - bass
- Joe LaBarbera - drums
