= Homecoming (Bill Evans album) =

Live album by Bill Evans
- Released: April 13, 1999
- Recorded: November 6, 1979
- Genre: Jazz
- Label: Milestone
- Producer: Eric Miller

Bill Evans chronology
Piano Player (1998)	Homecoming (1999)	The Last Waltz: The Final Recordings (2000)

Homecoming is a live album by jazz pianist Bill Evans with his final trio, consisting of bassist Marc Johnson and drummer Joe LaBarbera, recorded at Southeastern Louisiana University in 1979 but not released until 1999 on the Milestone label.

== Background ==
This concert was given at Evans' alma mater, from which he had graduated with honors in 1950. The last concert he had played there was his senior recital, consisting of solo works by Bach, Brahms, Chopin, and Kabalevsky and then concluding with Beethoven's Piano Concerto No. 3. This time, the program consisted of four of Evans' own originals and various jazz standards and contemporary compositions closely associated with him. The pianist said to the audience, "I won't try to go into what kind of special night this is for me."

One of Evans' pieces that the trio performs is "Very Early", which the pianist actually composed as an exercise while an undergraduate at Southeastern Louisiana University. He first recorded it on the album Moon Beams in 1962; it has since gone on to become a standard, recorded more than 200 times.

The title of the Paul Simon song Evans plays on the program is given incorrectly on the back cover (see track listing below). The disc also includes a 6-minute interview with Evans, in which he discusses such subjects as his time at Southeastern Louisiana University, the Village Vanguard recordings with Scott LaFaro, and Kind of Blue.

The Homecoming concert was recorded just 20 days before the trio's celebrated Paris concert, which was also recorded and released on two CDs.

== Reception ==
The AllMusic review by Rick Anderson awarded the album 4 stars and states, "This disc is a valuable historical document, but it's also a genuine pleasure to listen to." The AllAboutJazz review by Douglas Payne stated, "Homecoming is a rich, instructive insight into the genius of this already over-recorded piano wonder—for hardcore devotees and the mildly interested alike. ... Homecoming is worth coming home to."

Professional ratings
Review scores
Source	Rating
Allmusic	4/5 stars
The Penguin Guide to Jazz Recordings	3/4 stars

== Track listing ==
All compositions by Bill Evans except as indicated

1. "Re: Person I Knew" - 4:03
2. "Midnight Mood" (Ben Raleigh, Joe Zawinul) - 6:22
3. "Laurie" - 7:46
4. "Theme from M*A*S*H (Suicide Is Painless)" (Mike Altman, Johnny Mandel) - 4:11
5. "Turn Out the Stars" - 4:52
6. "Very Early" - 5:11
7. "But Beautiful" (Johnny Burke, Jimmy Van Heusen) - 4:12
8. "I Loves You, Porgy" (George Gershwin, Ira Gershwin, DuBose Heyward) - 5:40
9. "Up with the Lark" (Jerome Kern, Leo Robin) - 5:38
10. "Minha (All Mine)" (Francis Hime) - 3:41
11. "I Do It for You" (aka "I Do It for Your Love") (Paul Simon) - 5:52
12. "Some Day My Prince Will Come" (Frank Churchill, Larry Morey) - 6:25
13. Interview with Bill Evans by Rod Starns - 6:00

- Recorded at the Southeastern Louisiana University in Hammond, Louisiana on November 6, 1979.

== Personnel ==
- Bill Evans - piano
- Marc Johnson - bass
- Joe LaBarbera - drums
