= The Paris Concert: Edition Two =

The Paris Concert: Edition two

Live album by Bill Evans
- Released: 1984
- Recorded: November 26, 1979
- Genre: Jazz
- Label: Elektra/Musician
- Producer: Helen Keane, Yves Abiteboul

Bill Evans chronology
| The Paris Concert: Edition One (1979) | The Paris Concert: Edition two (1984) | Turn Out the Stars: The Final Village Vanguard Recordings (1980) |

The Paris Concert: Edition Two is a live album by jazz pianist Bill Evans with bassist Marc Johnson and drummer Joe LaBarbera recorded in Paris, France, in 1979 and originally released on the Elektra/Musician label. Additional recordings from this concert were released as The Paris Concert: Edition One.

== Background ==
In a June 1980 interview, partially reprinted in the CD liner notes to Edition Two, Evans stated that he felt his final trio was "very much connected to the first trio" with Scott LaFaro and Paul Motian. He added:

I feel that the trio I have now is karmic, in that the whole thing had to evolve the way it did through a year of very hard searching and trauma, going through bass players and so forth [after Eddie Gómez had left the group]. Which is difficult for the kind of music I play. I believe in a steady group. I believe in a group where the people are right for the group, where they believe in the music, and they're responsible, and you stay together. That way, the music grows in ways you don't even realize.

Bassist Marc Johnson said that he "was always infatuated with the Evans trio" and that LaFaro and Gómez had been important influences on him. "Like them, I wanted to participate more fully, be an independent voice, rather than just playing straight time and being the harmonic 'bottom' in a jazz group." After fulfilling his dream by joining the group, he noted that "Bill and Joe [LaBarbera] spoiled me: they were so musical all the time. Bill could take you places that previously were impossible to reach." Johnson also said that he was "particularly happy with the [group's] playing" during the Paris concert.

== Repertoire ==
Unlike Edition One, this recording focuses largely on Evans' own compositions, featuring four of them. Keith Shadwick notes that "Edition Two is decidedly darker" and singles out the new composition "Laurie," written for Evans' girlfriend, Laurie Verchomin, for its "great intensity in classic jazz-ballad style." "Letter to Evan" was another recent composition, dedicated to the pianist's son, Evan Evans, who was then only 4 years old. The other two Evans pieces, "Re: Person I Knew" and "34 Skidoo," date back to the early 1960s. The program is rounded out by two pieces composed by former associates of the pianist: "Gary's Theme" by Gary McFarland, with whom Evans recorded an album in 1963, and "Nardis" by Evans' former employer Miles Davis. The latter often served as an extended closer for the final trio, featuring solos by all three players, as it does here, with this "blockbusting" version running to 17½ minutes.

Edition Two also includes brief excerpts from a conversation between Bill Evans and his brother, Harry Evans, as an epilogue.

== Reception ==
The AllMusic review by Scott Yanow awarded the album 4½ stars and states, "The music is sensitive and subtly exciting ... and serves as evidence that, rather than declining, [Evans] was showing a renewed vitality and enthusiasm in his last year."

Professional ratings
Review scores
| Source | Rating |
|---|---|
| AllMusic | 4.5/5 stars |
| The Penguin Guide to Jazz Recordings | 3.5/4 stars |

== Cover ==
The photograph of the cover was taken in the Parc de Sceaux (Grand canal).

== Track listing ==
All compositions by Bill Evans except as indicated

1. "Re: Person I Knew" - 5:22
2. "Gary's Theme" (Gary McFarland) - 5:31
3. "Letter to Evan" - 4:50
4. "34 Skidoo" - 6:45
5. "Laurie" - 8:06
6. "Nardis" (Miles Davis) - 17:31
7. Interview - 1:46

== Personnel ==
- Bill Evans - piano
- Marc Johnson - bass
- Joe LaBarbera - drums
