= George Russell Sextet in K.C. =

Studio album by George Russell
- Released: 1961
- Recorded: February 23, 1961
- Genre: Jazz
- Length: 43:05
- Label: Decca

George Russell chronology
Stratusphunk (1960)	George Russell Sextet in K.C. (1961)	Ezz-thetics (1961)

Professional ratings
Review scores
Source	Rating
Down Beat	4.5/5 stars
Allmusic	4.5/5 stars

George Russell Sextet in K.C. (subtitled Original Swinging Instrumentals and sometimes referred to by that name) is an album by George Russell recorded (despite the title) in a New York studio and originally released on Decca in 1961. The album contains performances by Russell with Don Ellis, David Baker, Dave Young, Chuck Israels and Joe Hunt. The Allmusic review by Ken Dryden states that "George Russell was at a creative peak in the early '60s as he recorded one memorable small-group session after another".

== Reception ==
Down Beat critic Richard B. Hadlock wrote in his June 21, 1962, review: "Russell, a kind of intellectual Thelonious Monk, has a remarkable little band that seems to get better with the passing months. It is about the most impressive assemblage of fresh young talent to be heard as a working unit anywhere."

== Track listing ==
All compositions by George Russell except as indicated

1. "War Gewesen" (David Baker) - 6:19
2. "Rhymes" (Carla Bley) - 4:27
3. "Lunacy" (Baker) - 7:15
4. "Sandu" (Clifford Brown) - 11:01
5. "Tune Up" (Miles Davis) - 8:05
6. "Theme" - 3:14

Recorded February 23, 1961, in NYC

== Personnel ==
- George Russell: piano, arranger, conductor
- Don Ellis: trumpet
- David Baker: trombone
- Dave Young: tenor saxophone
- Chuck Israels: bass
- Joe Hunt: drums
