= Minority (Gigi Gryce song) =

Instrumental by Gigi Gryce with Clifford Brown
- Recorded: October 8, 1953
- Genre: Jazz
- Composer(s): Gigi Gryce

"Minority" is a 16-bar jazz standard in a minor key by Gigi Gryce, first recorded with Clifford Brown in Paris on October 8, 1953. Gryce recorded it again with Art Blakey and on his The Hap'nin's album for Prestige (1960). The song has been recorded over 40 times.

== Selected recordings ==
- Art Blakey: Blakey (EmArcy, 1954)
- Cannonball Adderley: Portrait of Cannonball (Riverside, 1958)
- Bill Evans: Everybody Digs Bill Evans (Riverside, 1958)
- Art Pepper: The Return of Art Pepper
- Bootsie Barnes: You Leave Me Breathless!
- Pat Martino: Strings! (Prestige, 1967)
- Ben Sidran: The Cat and the Hat (1980)
- Bud Shank/Phil Woods: Bouncing with Bud and Phil: Live at Yoshi's (1995)
- Jackie McLean
