= Portrait of Cannonball =

Studio album by Cannonball Adderley
- Released: 1958
- Recorded: July 1, 1958
- Studio: Reeves Sound (New York City)
- Genre: Jazz
- Length: 38:06; 57:49 CD reissue
- Label: Riverside; RLP 12-269
- Producer: Orrin Keepnews

Cannonball Adderley chronology
Somethin' Else (1958)	Portrait of Cannonball (1958)	Jump for Joy (1958)

Professional ratings
Review scores
Source	Rating
Allmusic	4/5 stars
The Penguin Guide to Jazz	3/4 stars

Portrait of Cannonball (1958) is the ninth album by jazz saxophonist Cannonball Adderley, and his first release on the Riverside label, featuring performances by Blue Mitchell, Bill Evans, Sam Jones, and Philly Joe Jones.

== Reception ==
The Allmusic review by Stephen Cook awarded the album 4 stars and states: "Everyone is in top form on a varied set.... One of the highlights from Adderley's hard bop prime". The Penguin Guide to Jazz awarded the album 3 stars stating "Portrait of Cannonball (which includes three alternate takes on the CD issue) finds Blue Mitchell taking some welcome limelight – though he sounds no more facile than the oft-maligned Nat - and an early glimpse of Bill Evans finding his way through "Nardis"".

== Track listing ==
All compositions by Julian "Cannonball" Adderley except as indicated

1. "Minority" (Gigi Gryce) - 7:05
2. "Straight Life" - 5:32
3. "Blue Funk" (Sam Jones) - 5:34
4. "A Little Taste" - 4:40
5. "People Will Say We're in Love" (Richard Rodgers, Oscar Hammerstein II) - 9:42
6. "Nardis" (Miles Davis) - 5:33
7. "Minority" [alternate take 2] (Gryce) - 7:32 Bonus track on CD reissue
8. "Minority" [alternate take 3] (Gryce) - 7:12 Bonus track on CD reissue
9. "Nardis" [alternate take 4] (Davis) - 5:35 Bonus track on CD reissue

== Personnel ==
- Cannonball Adderley - alto saxophone
- Blue Mitchell - trumpet
- Bill Evans - piano
- Sam Jones - bass
- Philly Joe Jones - drums
