= Explorations (Bill Evans album) =

Studio album by The Bill Evans Trio
- Released: March 1961
- Recorded: February 2, 1961
- Studio: Bell Sound (New York City)
- Genre: Jazz
- Length: 39:48 (original LP); 50:58 (1987 reissue); 60:00 (2011 reissue)
- Label: Riverside
- Producer: Orrin Keepnews

The Bill Evans Trio chronology
Portrait in Jazz (1959)	Explorations (1961)	Sunday at the Village Vanguard (1961)

Explorations is a studio album by American jazz pianist Bill Evans that was originally released by Riverside Records in 1961. It was the second and final studio album Evans recorded with his classic trio featuring Scott LaFaro on bass and Paul Motian on drums.

== Background ==
The album is a follow-up to the trio's first recording from two years earlier, Portrait in Jazz. The delay in making a new record was largely attributable to Evans's drug habit and resulting hepatitis, which led LaFaro to play and record in the meantime with Ornette Coleman. When Explorations was finally recorded, it was not under happy circumstances. As Evans biographer Keith Shadwick relates: "Tension ... simmered, particularly between Evans and the abrasive LaFaro, who made no secret of his disgust at Evans's addiction. LaFaro played on a borrowed instrument, while the pianist was quickly complaining of a headache, probably brought on by the strain in the studio." Nonetheless, the resulting album turned out to be an influential and enduring classic that "brilliantly illustrates [Evans's] innovative concept of 'simultaneous improvisation.'"

== Repertoire ==
The album's eight original tracks include five jazz standards and three modern jazz compositions. Explorations opens with a cover of John Carisi's "Israel," which had first been recorded by Miles Davis on the second Birth of the Cool session. The trio also covers Davis's own "Nardis," which Evans had first recorded in 1958 with Cannonball Adderley. Ted Gioia notes that "you could trace Evans's entire career by studying his different interpretations of this composition over the years, documented by more than 30 recordings." Also included is the ballad-waltz "Elsa" composed by Evans's friend Earl Zindars. Peter Pettinger comments that "Evans began it with an air of mystery, like the unveiling of a secret, the gentle introduction melting imperceptibly into the tune." Evans would record it again just a few weeks later with Adderley for the album Know What I Mean? and then revisit it a few years later on Trio '65. A number of later live versions through 1975 are also in circulation, and Evans would record several other Zindars compositions through the years.

Pettinger notes that the treatment of Irving Berlin's classic song "How Deep Is the Ocean?" was "remarkable at the time for leaving the melody till the end." Unlike Evans's three previously released trio recordings, Explorations includes no originals by the pianist.

== Reception ==
Professional ratings
Review scores
Source	Rating
All About Jazz	(no rating)
AllMusic	4.5/5 stars
The Rolling Stone Jazz Record Guide	5/5 stars
Encyclopedia of Popular Music	5/5 stars
The Penguin Guide to Jazz Recordings	4/4 stars

The album won the Billboard Jazz Critics Best Piano LP poll for 1961.

David Rickert of All About Jazz wrote, "Evans demands to be heard, seducing you with his indelibly emotional playing. ... The trio works magic here, breathing fresh air into standards such as 'How Deep Is the Ocean?' and 'Beautiful Love' and creating the illusion that these songs were written just so someone like Evans could play them. The highlight of the album is 'Elsa,' which is one of the most beautiful piano ballads on record."

Writing for AllMusic, critic Thom Jurek said of the album: "Evans, with Paul Motian and Scott LaFaro, was onto something as a trio, exploring the undersides of melodic and rhythmic constructions that had never been considered by most. ... Explorations is an extraordinary example of the reach and breadth of this trio at its peak."

== Reissues ==
The album was remastered and reissued on compact disc by Riverside and Original Jazz Classics in 1987 with two bonus tracks. In the liner notes, producer Orrin Keepnews discusses these additional recordings, "Beautiful Love (take 1)" and "The Boy Next Door"; the first version of "Beautiful Love" included on the original LP was a second take. In fact, as Keepnews specifies, "this is not the usual case of a second attempt that immediately followed the first. ... Early in this date, [Evans] played this number once; we both approved, and he moved on to something else. Much later, he decided to try a second 'Beautiful Love,' which he later preferred." "The Boy Next Door," on the other hand, was set aside at the time of the LP, because of the limited space available on the album.

In 2011, a new CD edition was released with two more bonus tracks, alternate takes of "How Deep Is the Ocean?" and "I Wish I Knew".

== Track listing ==
Side one

1. "Israel" (John Carisi) – 6:12
2. "Haunted Heart" (Arthur Schwartz, Howard Dietz) – 3:28
3. "Beautiful Love" [Take 2] (Wayne King, Egbert Van Alstyne, Victor Young) – 5:04
4. "Elsa" (Earl Zindars) – 5:10

Side two

1. "Nardis" (Miles Davis) – 5:49
2. "How Deep Is the Ocean?" (Irving Berlin) – 3:31
3. "I Wish I Knew" (Harry Warren, Mack Gordon) – 4:39
4. "Sweet and Lovely" (Gus Arnheim, Jules LeMare, Harry Tobias) – 5:52

2011 CD bonus tracks

9. "The Boy Next Door" (Hugh Martin, Ralph Blane)
10. "Beautiful Love" [Take 1]
11. "How Deep Is the Ocean?" [Take 2]
12. "I Wish I Knew" [Take 2]

== Personnel ==
- Bill Evans - piano
- Scott LaFaro - bass
- Paul Motian - drums

=== Additional personnel ===
- Orrin Keepnews - producer
- Bill Stoddard - engineer
- Jack Matthews - mastering engineer
