= Getting Sentimental =

Live album by Bill Evans
- Released: August 12, 2003
- Recorded: January 15, 1978
- Genre: Jazz
- Label: Milestone

Bill Evans chronology
Consecration: The Final Recordings Part 2 (2002)	Getting Sentimental (2003)	The Complete Village Vanguard Recordings, 1961 (2005)

Getting Sentimental is a live album by jazz pianist Bill Evans with Michael Moore and Philly Joe Jones recorded at the Village Vanguard in 1978 but not released until 2003 on the Milestone label.

== Reception ==
The Allmusic review by Alex Henderson awarded the album 3 stars and states "Getting Sentimental isn't essential and isn't recommended to casual listeners; nonetheless, Evans' more obsessive fans will welcome this enjoyable, if imperfect, release with open arms". The All About Jazz review by Russell Moon stated "Fantasy is to be commended for releasing Getting Sentimental as an example of what Evans was doing in early 1978, but the label has many other Bill Evans offerings which are superior".

Professional ratings
Review scores
Source	Rating
Allmusic	3/5 stars
The Penguin Guide to Jazz Recordings	3/4 stars

== Track listing ==
All compositions by Bill Evans except as indicated

1. "I Should Care" (Sammy Cahn, Axel Stordahl, Paul Weston) - 4:55
2. "How My Heart Sings" (Earl Zindars) - 5:18
3. "Gary's Theme" (Gary McFarland) - 4:39
4. "I'm Getting Sentimental Over You" (George Bassman, Ned Washington) - 4:44
5. "Quiet Now" (Denny Zeitlin) - 5:29
6. "Re: Person I Knew" - 5:01
7. "The Peacocks" (Jimmy Rowles) - 6:11
8. "Emily" (Johnny Mandel, Johnny Mercer) - 4:53
9. "Theme from M*A*S*H (Suicide Is Painless)" (Mike Altman, Johnny Mandel) - 4:51
10. "Turn Out the Stars" - 4:54
11. "When I Fall in Love" (Edward Heyman, Victor Young) - 4:18
12. "In Your Own Sweet Way" (Dave Brubeck) - 6:18
13. "But Beautiful" (Johnny Burke, Jimmy Van Heusen) - 5:41
14. "I Love You" (Cole Porter) - 4:57

- Recorded at the Village Vanguard in New York City on January 15, 1978.

== Personnel ==
- Bill Evans - piano
- Michael Moore - bass
- Philly Joe Jones - drums
