= Our Delight =

1946 song by Tadd Dameron

Song by Dizzy Gillespie
- Released: 1946
- Recorded: July 9, 1946
- Length: 2:27
- Label: Musicraft
- Composer: Tadd Dameron

"Our Delight" is a 1946 jazz standard, composed by Tadd Dameron, and recorded by Dizzy Gillespie. It is considered one of Dameron's best compositions, along with "Good Bait", "Hot House", "If You Could See Me Now", and "Lady Bird". It has an AABA construction. A moderately fast bebop song, it featured the trumpeter Fats Navarro, who is said to "exhibit mastery of the difficult chord progression". One author said, "'Our Delight' is a genuine song, a bubbly, jaggedly ascending theme that sticks in one's mind, enriched by harmonic interplay between a flaming trumpet section led by Dizzy, creamy moaning reeds and crooning trombones. The written accompaniments to the solos–in particular the leader's two statements–are full of inventiveness, creating call-and-response patterns and counter-melodies. What is boppish here is the off-center, syncopated melody, as well as the shifting, internal voicings of the chords, especially at the very end. These voicings, along with a love of tuneful melodies that one walks out of a jazz club humming, were Tadd's main legacy to such composers and arrangers as Benny Golson, Gigi Gryce, and Jimmy Heath." Rolling Stone describes the song as a "bop gem".

There are more than 120 cover versions of "Our Delight". Bill Evans recorded his version of the composition for his debut album New Jazz Conceptions in 1956.
