= George Russell Sextet at the Five Spot =

Studio album by George Russell
- Released: 1960
- Recorded: September 20, 1960
- Genre: Jazz
- Label: Decca
- Producer: Tom Greenwood, Carlos Kase

George Russell chronology
Jazz in the Space Age (1960)	George Russell Sextet at the Five Spot (1960)	Stratusphunk (1960)

Professional ratings
Review scores
Source	Rating
Allmusic	4.5/5 stars
The Penguin Guide to Jazz Recordings	4/4 stars

George Russell Sextet at the Five Spot is an album by George Russell originally released on Decca in 1960. The album contains performances at the Five Spot Café by Russell with Al Kiger, David Baker, Dave Young, Chuck Israels and Joe Hunt. The Allmusic review by Ken Dryden states that "Although Russell plays more of a composer/arranger style of piano, his very challenging arrangements are very attractive. Anyone who enjoys his releases for RCA, Riverside, and Decca from around this period in his career should definitely acquire this sure-to-be-collectable CD".

== Track listing ==
All compositions by George Russell except as indicated

1. "Sippin' at Bells" (Miles Davis) - 7:19
2. "Dance Class" (Carla Bley) - 6:17
3. "Swingdom Come" - 7:30
4. "121 Bank Street" (David Baker) - 5:58
5. "Beast Blues" (Bley) - 8:56
6. "Moment's Notice" (John Coltrane) - 8:02

Recorded September 20, 1960, in NYC

== Personnel ==
- George Russell: piano, arranger, conductor
- Al Kiger: trumpet
- David Baker: trombone
- Dave Young: tenor saxophone
- Chuck Israels: bass
- Joe Hunt: drums
