= Tenderly: An Informal Session =

Studio album by Bill Evans and Don Elliott
- Released: June 19, 2001
- Recorded: 1956–1957 at Don Elliott's Studio, Weston, CT
- Genre: Jazz
- Length: 56:37
- Label: Milestone; MCD-9317
- Producer: Eric Miller

Bill Evans chronology
The Last Waltz: The Final Recordings (2000)	Tenderly: An Informal Session (2001)	Consecration: The Final Recordings Part 2 (2002)

Tenderly: An Informal Session is an album featuring some of the earliest recordings by jazz pianist Bill Evans with Don Elliott recorded at Elliott's studio in 1956 and 1957 but not released until 2001 on the Milestone label.

== Reception ==
The AllMusic review by Alex Henderson awarded the album 2½ stars and states "Tenderly is far from essential and isn't for those who have only a casual interest in Evans' pianism -- this CD is strictly for collectors, who will want a copy despite its imperfections". The All About Jazz review by Derek Taylor observed "Never intended for release, listeners expecting a tightly cropped and polished studio date are likely to be disappointed. Fantasy producer Eric Miller opted to leave those extraneous noises that did not directly compromise the music in the mix. The result is voyeuristic snapshot of two musicians playing purely for their own enjoyment, working out tunes on the spot and tinkering expressively with standard and blues building blocks". JazzTimes reviewer Doug Ramsey wrote "The fascination in hearing these rehearsal tapes is to follow Evans' mental processes as he sorts out harmonies, chord voicings and rhythmic notions".

Professional ratings
Review scores
Source	Rating
AllMusic	2.5/5 stars
The Penguin Guide to Jazz Recordings	3/4 stars

== Track listing ==
1. "Tenderly" (Walter Gross, Jack Lawrence) - 6:40
2. "I'll Take Romance" (Oscar Hammerstein II, Ben Oakland) - 4:20
3. "Laura" (Johnny Mercer, David Raksin) - 7:12
4. "Blues No. 1" (Don Elliott, Bill Evans) - 5:08
5. "I'll Know" (Frank Loesser) - 4:11
6. "Like Someone in Love" (Johnny Burke, Jimmy van Heusen) - 1:39
7. "Love Letters" (Edward Heyman, Victor Young) - 0:56
8. "Thou Swell" (Lorenz Hart, Richard Rodgers) - 1:40
9. "Airegin" (Sonny Rollins) - 5:47
10. "Everything Happens to Me" (Tom Adair, Matt Dennis) - 5:24
11. "Blues No. 2" (Elliott, Evans) - 8:13
12. "Stella by Starlight" (Ned Washington, Victor Young) - 2:27
13. "Funkallero" (Evans) - 3:00

== Personnel ==
- Bill Evans - piano
- Don Elliott - vibraphone, vocal percussion
