= Trio '65 =

Studio album by The Bill Evans Trio
- Released: June 1965
- Recorded: February 3, 1965
- Studio: Van Gelder, Englewood Cliffs, New Jersey
- Genre: Jazz
- Length: 37:29
- Label: Verve
- Producer: Creed Taylor

The Bill Evans Trio chronology
Waltz for Debby (1964)	Trio '65 (1965)	Bill Evans Trio with Symphony Orchestra (1965)

Trio '65 is a studio album by the American jazz pianist Bill Evans and his trio, released by Verve in 1965.

== Background ==
After rebounding from the death of Scott LaFaro in 1961, Evans had reached a high point in his career at the time of this recording, having won critical accolades and a Grammy Award for the experimental overdubbed album Conversations with Myself (1963) and having finally out-polled Oscar Peterson in the 1964 DownBeat readers' poll. His success, however, was leading to some pushback by detractors such as DownBeat critic John S. Wilson and avant-garde pianist Cecil Taylor, and behind the scenes he was struggling with his heroin habit.

Pianist Clare Fischer had recommended Larry Bunker, an in-demand studio drummer and vibraphonist, as a replacement for the departed Paul Motian, and when Bunker had sat in with Evans and bassist Chuck Israels, "Bill grinned broadly ... and Larry was hired on the spot." Bunker was well prepared for this job, as he said he had been listening to "almost no one else" except Evans for "the last five years." However, his tenure with the trio turned out to be relatively brief—less than two years—and ended shortly after this album was recorded. Evans had to be hospitalized for drug abuse and malnutrition, leading to the cancellation of a two-week gig at the Plugged Nickel in Chicago, which prompted Bunker to quit the trio. Evans would struggle to retain a drummer until Marty Morell joined the trio in 1968.

== Repertoire ==
Evans had previously recorded seven of the eight selections on this album, which led to some disappointment in its reception. The one new number was the recent Leslie Bricusse/Anthony Newley hit, "Who Can I Turn To?", which became a permanent part of Evans' repertoire. Peter Pettinger notes: "This kind of showtune satisfied Evans's sense of form, its solid, thirty-two-bar construction harnessing melody and harmony toward a heart-filling climax."

== Reception ==
Professional ratings
Review scores
Source	Rating
AllMusic	4/5 stars
Down Beat	3/5 stars
The Penguin Guide to Jazz	3/4 stars

Writing for AllMusic, music critic Scott Yanow said of the album: "Although all eight of the selections heard on this Verve release have been recorded on other occasions by pianist Bill Evans, these renditions hold their own."

Keith Shadwick observes, "The trio works very closely together and shows all the attention to dynamics and overall coherence that one would expect from a group led by [Evans], but nothing remarkable happens. It is simply the now-familiar Evans treatment of a bunch of well-known tunes .... A possible exception to this well-worn air is Tadd Dameron's 'If You Could See Me Now', which receives a slow and rapturous treatment packed full of feeling."

== Track listing ==
1. "Israel" (John Carisi) – 4:49
2. "Elsa" (Earl Zindars) – 4:22
3. "'Round Midnight" (Thelonious Monk, Cootie Williams) – 6:42
4. "Our Love Is Here to Stay" (George Gershwin, Ira Gershwin) – 4:02
5. "How My Heart Sings" (Earl Zindars) – 2:49
6. "Who Can I Turn To?" (Leslie Bricusse, Anthony Newley) – 4:53
7. "Come Rain or Come Shine" (Harold Arlen, Johnny Mercer) – 5:26
8. "If You Could See Me Now" (Tadd Dameron, Carl Sigman) – 4:47

== Personnel ==
- Bill Evans – piano
- Larry Bunker – drums
- Chuck Israels – bass

== Charts ==
2022 chart performance for Trio '65
Chart (2022)	Peak position
Belgian Albums (Ultratop Flanders)	128
German Albums (Offizielle Top 100)	38
Swiss Albums (Schweizer Hitparade)	42
