= Overpass (album) =

Studio album by Marc Johnson
- Released: 27 August 2021
- Recorded: January–February 2018
- Studio: Nacena Studios in Säo Paulo, Brazil
- Genre: Post-bop, jazz
- Length: 43:23
- Label: ECM
- Producer: Marc Johnson, Eliane Elias

Marc Johnson chronology
Swept Away (2012)	Overpass (2021)

Overpass is a studio album by the jazz acoustic bassist Marc Johnson. ECM released the album on 27 August 2021.

== Background ==
Overpass was his first album in about 10 years. It is a rare bass-only album; it contains eight compositions recorded in Säo Paulo, Brazil during 2018. Five tracks are originals; three tracks are covers: Miles Davis’ "Nardis" and Alex North's "Love Theme from Spartacus" were staples of the Bill Evans’ repertoire. Johnson and his wife Eliane Elias produced the record.

Johnson said that several things led him to record this album, commenting, " I’ve been experimenting with different ways of playing alone with the bass to make music and came up with a couple of different meditative-type, pattern-oriented concepts. That started the idea of doing a whole record like that some time. I’ve been experimenting with that and throwing them on different album projects for different people, like with John Abercrombie. There are some moments in a track here or there, where I dive into something like that, but I had never tried to do a whole piece from start to finish with just that being the impetus of thing."

== Reception ==
Professional ratings
Review scores
Source	Rating
All About Jazz	4/5 stars
DownBeat	4.5/5 stars
Jazzwise	3/5 stars
Tom Hull	B+

Jeff Tamarkin writing for the JazzTimes stated, "Each bassist who’s taken the solo plunge has approached it with a different methodology, but one guiding principle behind most of their creations is the need to coax the listener’s brain into filling in the considerable spaces left by the absence of others, to give the illusion of fullness. Most of us simply aren’t accustomed to hearing an unaccompanied upright acoustic bass for a long stretch of time. Johnson is well aware of that, and he takes care to maintain continually involving conversations with himself throughout these eight pieces." Nigel Jarrett of the Jazz Journal wrote, "Overpass is so called to describe a mini-survey of charts with which Johnson has been associated in one way or another. It’s his first solo album, and it presents a jazz master on peak form and home alone." Karl Ackermann of All About Jazz added, "The virtuoso bassist Marc Johnson has kept a relatively low profile as a leader. Overpass marks Johnson's return to Manfred Eicher's label after ten years, and is his first solo album... The music of Marc Johnson, original and repurposed, mingles traditional jazz, vivid structures, and improvisation, and an intuitively unique style develops. It's quite a feat to generate so much appealing sound from a single, double bass, but Johnson is talented enough to make that kind of magic happen."

== Track listing ==
No.	Title	Writer(s)	Length
1.	"Freedom Jazz Dance"	Eddie Harris	6:47
2.	"Nardis"	Miles Davis	5:18
3.	"Samurai Fly"	Johnson	4:20
4.	"Love Theme From Spartacus"	Alex North	4:23
5.	"Life of Pai"	Johnson	4:25
6.	"And Strike Each Tuneful String"	Johnson	7:20
7.	"Yin and Yang"	Johnson	4:16
8.	"Whorled Whirled World"	Johnson	6:32
Total length:			43:23

== Personnel ==
- Marc Johnson – bass
