= Come Rain or Come Shine =

1946 popular music song

Single

from the album St. Louis Woman
- Released: 1946
- Composer: Harold Arlen
- Lyricist: Johnny Mercer

"Come Rain or Come Shine" is a popular music song and jazz standard with music by Harold Arlen and lyrics by Johnny Mercer. It was written for the Broadway musical St. Louis Woman, which opened on March 30, 1946, and closed after 113 performances. The show also produced another notable standard, "Any Place I Hang My Hat Is Home."

"Come Rain or Come Shine" is one in a series of enduring songs with meteorological themes that Arlen composed through the course of his career, including "Stormy Weather" (1933), "Ill Wind" (1934), "Over the Rainbow" (1939), "When the Sun Comes Out" (1941), and "I Never Has Seen Snow" (1954).

== Chart performance ==
The song "became a modest hit during the show's run, making the pop charts with a Margaret Whiting (Paul Weston and His Orchestra) recording rising to number seventeen, and, shortly after, a Helen Forrest and Dick Haymes recording rising to number twenty-three."

== Structure ==
"Come Rain or Come Shine" begins most unusually: As Ted Gioia notes, "Arlen delivers the same note—flogging an A natural until it is bloody—13 times in a row .... And, as if that isn't enough, he tosses out a half-dozen more of the same note in bar five, and another six over the next two bars. This isn't a melody; it's a musical starvation diet."

Nonetheless, as Alec Wilder observes, this "superb ballad ... could never be so great unless the device of those repeated notes were the principal single element in the melody. The second section is without them, providing an essential contrast. ... The whole last half of the song builds inexorably to the final f natural." He also notes that the song's harmony "is opulent throughout."

== Legacy ==
The song has gone on to become a major jazz standard, covered many hundreds of times. As Gioia notes, "Given the paucity of melodic material and the richness of the harmonic underpinnings, the composition tends to resist grandstanding, and instead appeals to the more introspective improviser. Recordings by Bill Evans, Stan Getz, and Ralph Towner testify to the pastoral qualities of Arlen's tune."

== Some notable recordings ==
- Tommy Dorsey (1946, first recording)
- Sarah Vaughan (C) (1950)
- Art Blakey and The Jazz Messengers (Moanin', 1958)
- Ray Charles (The Genius of Ray Charles, May 1959)
- Bill Evans (Portrait in Jazz, December 1959)
- Ella Fitzgerald (Ella Fitzgerald Sings the Harold Arlen Song Book (Bb), January 1961)
- Frank Sinatra (Sinatra and Strings (D), November 1961)
- Peggy Lee (I'm a Woman, 1963)
- Monica Zetterlund with the Bill Evans Trio (Waltz for Debby, 1964)
- James Brown (Cold Sweat, 1967)
- Stan Getz (Pure Getz, 1982)
