= New Jazz Conceptions =

Studio album by Bill Evans
- Released: End of February 1957
- Recorded: September 18 and 27, 1956
- Studio: Reeves Sound Studios, New York City
- Genre: Jazz
- Length: 41:18 (original LP); 49:56 (CD reissue)
- Label: Riverside; RLP 12-223
- Producer: Orrin Keepnews

Bill Evans chronology
| New Jazz Conceptions (1956) | Everybody Digs Bill Evans (1958) |

Alternative cover
- LP cover

New Jazz Conceptions is the debut album by jazz pianist Bill Evans, recorded in two sessions during September 1956 for Riverside Records.

== Background ==
Evans was playing a gig with his old friend, the guitarist Mundell Lowe, who had been recording for the newly emerging independent jazz label Riverside. Lowe played a demo tape featuring Evans over the phone to Riverside producer Orrin Keepnews and his partner, Bill Grauer, who were sufficiently impressed that they resolved to catch Evans playing live. After hearing him at the Village Vanguard several times, they offered him a recording contract at scale wages. Keepnews had some trouble persuading Evans to record—an ironic situation, as "usually, of course, it is the artist trying to persuade the producer."

The album was recorded in two sessions on September 18 and 27, 1956. Evans played three extremely brief solos: Duke Ellington's "I Got It Bad (and That Ain't Good)," Richard Rodgers's "My Romance," which would remain an integral part of Evans's repertoire and be recorded by him many times in trio settings, and the original version of his own most widely recognized and recorded composition, "Waltz for Debby."

On the album, these solos were interspersed among eight trio recordings featuring bassist Teddy Kotick and drummer Paul Motian, both of whom Evans had been playing with in Tony Scott's quartet. Motian would go on to become a member of Evans's classic 1959–1961 trio with Scott LaFaro. The trio recordings included three more originals by Evans: "Five," "Displacement," and "No Cover, No Minimum," the first of which would become a regular part of his repertoire for the rest of his career. Like many jazz tunes, "Five" is based on the chord changes of Gershwin's "I Got Rhythm" and, unusually for Evans, it has an angularity reminiscent of the compositions of Thelonious Monk; pianist Warren Bernhardt, a close friend of Evans, noted that it's extremely difficult to play.

New Jazz Conceptions was Evans's sixth recording project overall, and he wouldn't allow himself to be coaxed back into the studio as a leader for another 27 months, for the seminal follow-up Everybody Digs Bill Evans. In the meantime, he continued to develop his personal style as a sideman, recording with such important contemporaries as George Russell, Charles Mingus, Helen Merrill, Miles Davis, Michel Legrand, Cannonball Adderley, and Art Farmer.

== Reception ==
Professional ratings
Review scores
| Source | Rating |
|---|---|
| All About Jazz | (no rating) |
| AllMusic | 4/5 stars |
| The Penguin Guide to Jazz Recordings | 3/4 stars |
| The Rolling Stone Jazz Record Guide | 4/5 stars |

Although a critical success that gained positive reviews in DownBeat and Metronome magazines, New Jazz Conceptions was initially a financial failure, selling only 800 copies the first year.

Writing for AllMusic, music critic Scott Yanow said about the album: "Bill Evans' debut as a leader found the 27-year-old pianist already sounding much different than the usual Bud Powell-influenced keyboardists of the time. ... A strong start to a rather significant career." Conversely, David Rickert of All About Jazz noted the apparent influence of Powell and wrote, "Even at this stage he had the chops to make this a good piano jazz album, but in the end it's not a very good Bill Evans album. ... There are glimpses of the later trademarks of Evans' style."

Evans biographer Keith Shadwick comments that the album "conclusively demonstrated Evans to be a highly competent and sophisticated modern jazz pianist with a definite compositional gift, but also showed him to be considerably short of a unified musical personality. It would be no coincidence that he would not make another album as a leader for close on two-and-a-half years."

== Reissues ==
New Jazz Conceptions was digitally remastered and released on CD by Riverside/Original Jazz Classics in 1987 with an alternative version of "No Cover, No Minimum" as a bonus track. Riverside reissued it with 20-bit K2 super coding in 2004.

== Track listing ==
1. "I Love You" (Cole Porter) – 3:55
2. "Five" (Bill Evans) – 4:03
3. "I Got It Bad (and That Ain't Good)" (Duke Ellington, Paul Francis Webster) – 1:39
4. "Conception" (George Shearing) – 4:47
5. "Easy Living" (Leo Robin, Ralph Rainger) – 3:53
6. "Displacement" (Evans) – 2:36
7. "Speak Low" (Kurt Weill, Ogden Nash) – 5:10
8. "Waltz for Debby" (Evans, Gene Lees) – 1:20
9. "Our Delight" (Tadd Dameron) – 4:47
10. "My Romance" (Richard Rodgers, Lorenz Hart) – 2:01
11. "No Cover, No Minimum" [Take 1] (Evans) – 8:14 Not part of original LP
12. "No Cover, No Minimum" – 7:31

== Personnel ==
- Bill Evans - Piano
- Teddy Kotick - Bass (except 3, 8, & 10)
- Paul Motian - Drums (except 3, 8, & 10)

=== Production ===
- Orrin Keepnews - Producer
- Bill Grauer - Producer
- Jack Higgins - Engineer
- Tamaki Beck - Mastering
