= Joe LaBarbera =

American jazz drummer and composer (born 1948)

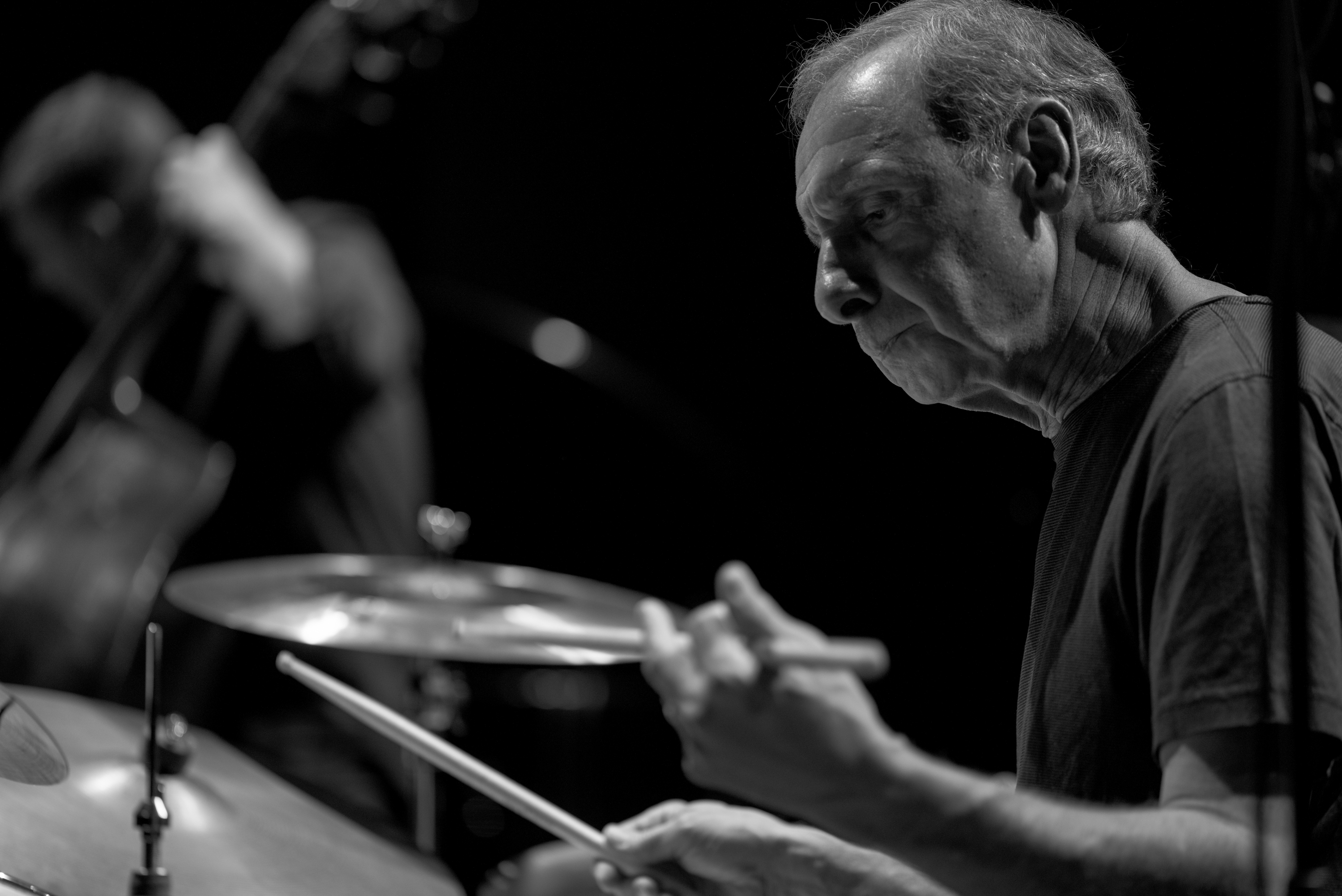
- LaBarbera performs at the International Jazz Festival of Punta del Este in 2015.

Background information
- Born: Joseph James LaBarbera; February 22, 1948 (age 78); Mount Morris, New York, U.S.
- Genres: Jazz
- Occupation: Musician
- Instrument: Drums
- Years active: 1970–present

Joseph James LaBarbera (born February 22, 1948) is an American jazz drummer and composer. He is best known for his recordings and live performances with the trio of pianist Bill Evans in the final years of Evans's career. His older brothers are saxophonist Pat LaBarbera and trumpeter John LaBarbera.

== Career ==
He grew up in Mount Morris, New York. His first drum teacher was his father. For two years in the late 1960s, he attended Berklee College of Music, then went on tour with singer Frankie Randall. After Berklee he spent two years with the US Army band at Fort Dix, New Jersey. He began his professional career playing with Woody Herman and the Thundering Herd.

His reputation grew in the 1970s when he spent four years recording and touring with Chuck Mangione. He also worked as a sideman for Bob Brookmeyer, Jim Hall, Art Farmer, Art Pepper, John Scofield, Toots Thielemans, and Phil Woods. In 1979 and 1980, he was a member of the Bill Evans Trio with bassist Marc Johnson, then spent much of the 1980s and early 1990s with Tony Bennett. He was in a quartet with his brother Pat and in a trio with Hein van de Geyn and John Abercrombie. He has taught at the California Institute of the Arts and the Bud Shank Jazz Workshop.

In 2021, LaBarbera, with writer and jazz critic Charles Levin, published a memoir about his time in the Bill Evans Trio, titled Times Remembered: The Final Years of the Bill Evans Trio (University of North Texas Press).

== Discography ==
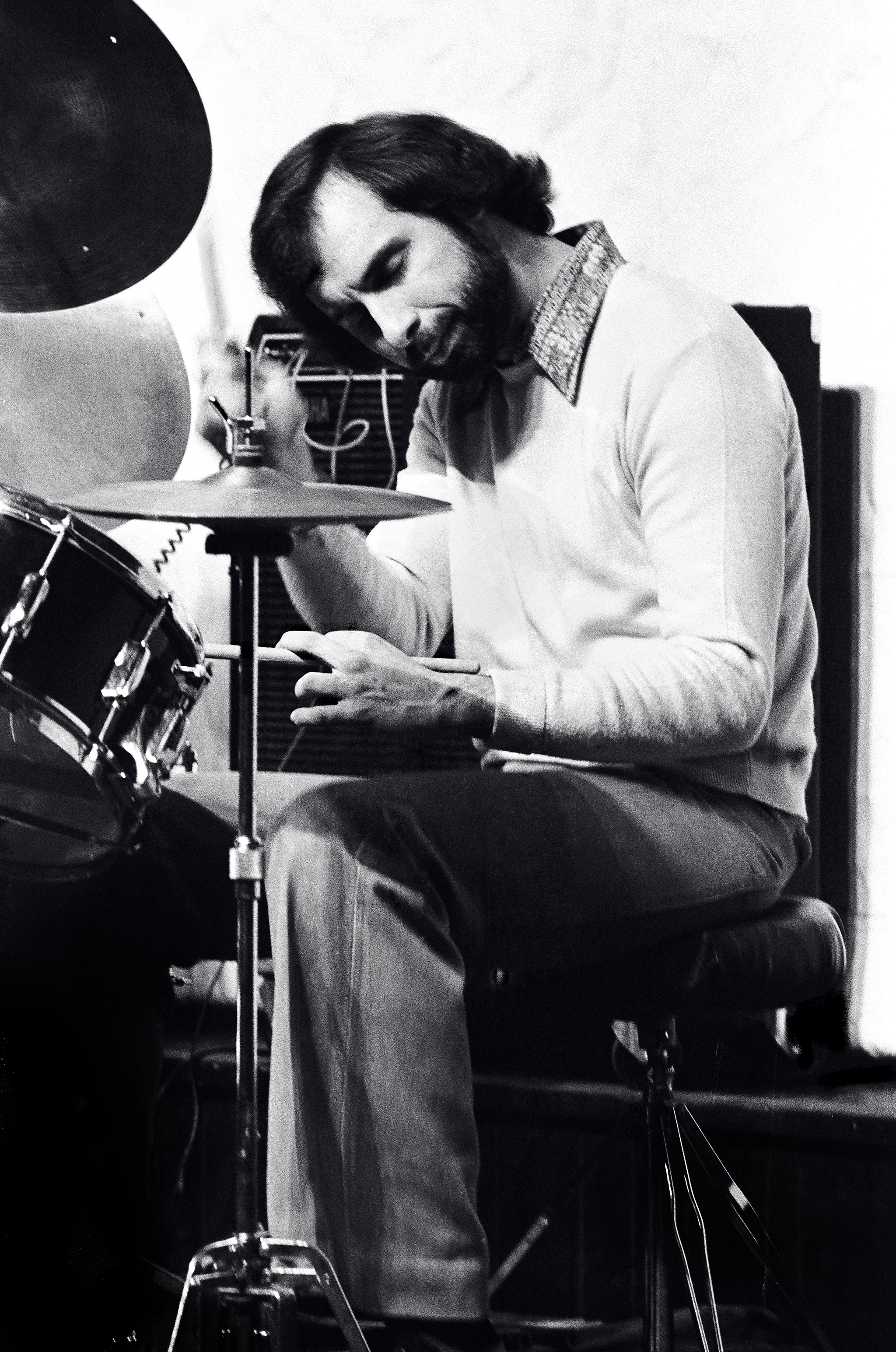
LaBarbera in 1978

=== As leader ===
- The Joe La Barbera Quintet Live (Jazz Compass, 2001)
- Mark Time (Jazz Compass, 2003)
- Love Locked Out (2003), with Patti Wicks and Keter Betts
- Native Land (Jazz Compass, 2006)
- Silver Streams (Jazz Compass, 2012)

=== As sideman ===
With Tony Bennett

- 1986 The Art of Excellence
- 1987 Bennett/Berlin
- 1990 Astoria: Portrait of the Artist
- 1992 Perfectly Frank
- 2007 Sings the Ultimate American Songbook Vol. 1

With Rosemary Clooney

- 1989 Rosemary Clooney Sings Rodgers, Hart & Hammerstein
- 1992 Girl Singer
- 1997 Mothers & Daughters
- 2000 The Songbook Collection
- 2001 Sentimental Journey: The Girl Singer and Her New Big Band

With Bill Cunliffe

- 1993 A Paul Simon Songbook
- 1995 Bill in Brazil
- 2001 Live at Bernie's
- 2002 Bill Cunliffe Sextet: Live at Rocco
- 2003 How My Heart Sings

With Bill Evans

- 1979 We Will Meet Again
- 1979 Live in Buenos Aires, 1979 (released 1990)
- 1979 Homecoming (released 1999)
- 1979 The Paris Concert: Edition One (released 1983)
- 1979 The Paris Concert: Edition Two (released 1984)
- 1979 Live at the Balboa Jazz Club, Vol. 1
- 1979 Live at the Balboa Jazz Club, Vol. 2
- 1979 Live at the Balboa Jazz Club, Vol. 3
- 1979 Live at the Balboa Jazz Club, Vol. 4
- 1979 Live at the Balboa Jazz Club, Vol. 5
- 1979 The Brilliant Bill Evans (released 1990)
- 1979 Live in Rome 1979 (released 2005)
- 1980 Turn Out the Stars: The Final Village Vanguard Recordings (6 CDs, released 1996)
- 1980 Letter to Evan (released 1994)
- 1980 His Last Concert in Germany (released 1996)
- 1980 The Last Waltz: The Final Recordings (8 CDs, released 2000)
- 1980 Consecration: The Final Recordings Part 2 (8 CDs, released 2002)

With John LaBarbera

- 2003 On the Wild Side (Jazz Compass)
- 2005 Fantazm (Jazz Compass)
- 2013 Caravan (Jazz Compass)

With Pat LaBarbera

- 1976 Pass It On
- 1993 JMOG (Jazz Men on the Go)
- 2003 Deep in a Dream
- 2005 Crossing the Line

With Chuck Mangione

- 1973 Land of Make Believe
- 1975 Bellavia
- 1975 Chase the Clouds Away

With Bud Shank

- 1996 Plays the Music of Bill Evans
- 1999 After You Jeru
- 2000 Silver Storm
- 2002 On the Trail
- 2009 Fascinating Rhythms

With Kim Richmond

- 1994 Range
- 1999 Look at the Time
- 2001 Ballads

With Terry Trotter and Trotter Trio

- 1993 It's About Time
- 1995 A Funny Thing Happened on the Way to the Forum...In Jazz
- 1995 Company...In
- 1995 Stephen Sondheim's Sweeney Todd in Jazz
- 1996 The Michel Legrand Album
- 1997 Sketches on Star Wars
- 1998 Follies
- 2001 The Fantasticks in Jazz

With others

- 1992 In Tribute, Diane Schuur
- 1997 " All the More", Kenny Wheeler
- 2003 As Time Goes By: The Great American Songbook, Volume II, Rod Stewart
- 2003 Michael Bublé, Michael Bublé
- 2004 Renee Olstead, Renee Olstead
- 2007 Call Me Irresponsible, Michael Bublé
- 2009 Skylark, Renee Olstead
- 2009 Crazy Love, Michael Bublé
- 2025 Seascape, Atlantic Jazz Collective, Alma Records
