= Waltz for Debby (1964 album) =

Studio album by Bill Evans, Monica Zetterlund
- Released: December 1964
- Recorded: August 29, 1964
- Studio: Stockholm, Sweden
- Genre: Vocal jazz
- Label: Verve

Bill Evans chronology
The Bill Evans Trio "Live" (1964)	Waltz for Debby (1964)	Trio '65 (1965)

Alternative Cover
- Cover of the 1997 West Wind reissue

Waltz for Debby is a 1964 album in English and Swedish by the Swedish singer Monica Zetterlund and an American jazz trio led by pianist Bill Evans. Evans met Zetterlund on a tour of Sweden and was "bowled over" by her EP recording of "Waltz for Debby" with a Swedish text titled "Monicas vals". Evans's manager, Helen Keane, set up a recording session for them at the end of the Swedish tour.

The album was re-released on CD by West Wind in 1997 and reissued by Verve Records in 2006.

== Reception ==
Professional ratings
Review scores
Source	Rating
AllMusic	3/5 stars

Writing for AllMusic, music critic Thom Jurek wrote of the album: "The match is seemingly perfect. Evans' lyricism is well suited to a breezy, sophisticated songstress like Monica Zetterlund. There is an iciness on this recording, but it is difficult to decipher if it is in the performance or in the engineering where she seems to be way out in front of the band, when she was really in the middle of all the musicians in the studio. ... The Swedish version of 'Waltz for Debby' is a true delight because Zetterlund's voice becomes another instrument, soloing over the top of Evans' stunning selection of comping chords. In all this is an odd but special item, one that is necessary—for at least one listen—by any serious fan of the pianist and composer."

== Track listing ==
1. "Come Rain or Come Shine" (Harold Arlen, Johnny Mercer) – 4:41
2. "A Beautiful Rose (Jag vet en dejlig rosa)" – 2:53
3. "Once Upon a Summertime" (Eddie Barclay, Michel Legrand, Johnny Mercer) – 3:03
4. "So Long Big Time" (Harold Arlen, Dory Previn) – 3:49
5. "Waltz for Debby (Monicas vals)" (Bill Evans, Beppe Wolgers) – 2:47
6. "Lucky to Be Me" (Leonard Bernstein) – 3:36
7. "Sorrow Wind (Vindarna Sucka)" – 3:03
8. "It Could Happen to You" (Johnny Burke, Jimmy Van Heusen) – 3:00
9. "Some Other Time" (Leonard Bernstein, Betty Comden, Adolph Green) – 5:35
10. "In the Night (Om Natten)" (Olle Adolphson) – 1:40

== Personnel ==
- Bill Evans – piano
- Monica Zetterlund – vocals
- Larry Bunker – drums
- Chuck Israels – bass
