= Blue in Green =

1959 composition by Bill Evans and Miles Davis

Composition by Bill Evans and Miles Davis

from the album Kind of Blue
- Released: August 17, 1959
- Recorded: March 2, 1959
- Genre: Modal jazz
- Length: 5:37
- Label: Columbia
- Composers: William Evans, Miles Davis
- Producer: Irving Townsend

"Blue in Green" is the third piece on Miles Davis' 1959 album Kind of Blue. One of two ballads on the recording (the other being "Flamenco Sketches"), it is the only piece on the album that does not feature alto saxophonist Cannonball Adderley.

In the original liner notes to the album, pianist Bill Evans describes the piece as "a 10-measure circular form following a 4-measure introduction and played by soloists in various augmentation and diminution of time values."

== Original recording ==
After four breakdowns, largely caused by bassist Paul Chambers, take 5 yielded the only complete original version of "Blue in Green". In Ashley Kahn's description, following a "light and airy" introduction by Evans, "creating a peaceful landscape for the group to enter into," an atypical "palindromic" sequence of solos follows: Davis then Evans then tenor saxophonist John Coltrane then Evans again and finally Davis again. Davis's "intensely languid" muted playing consists largely of long-held notes, while Evans "displays a daunting command of color and voicing in his chordal playing." Coltrane's "early love of Lester Young's light and airy feel is conjured to opportune effect in his brooding, fleeting statement." Evans restates the theme, and the piece fades away over bowed notes from Chambers. On the session tape, producer Irving Townsend commented: "Beautiful. ... Beautiful."

== Disputed authorship ==
It has long been speculated that Evans actually wrote "Blue in Green," even though the LP and some jazz fakebooks credit only Davis with its composition. In his autobiography, Davis maintains that he alone composed the pieces on Kind of Blue, but in 1986, he allegedly told Quincy Troupe that Evans and he wrote "Blue in Green" together. The version of the piece on Evans' trio album Portrait in Jazz, recorded in late 1959, credits it to "Davis-Evans". In a radio interview broadcast on May 27, 1979, Evans himself said that he had written the piece. On being asked about the issue by interviewer Marian McPartland, he said: "The truth is I did [write the music] ... I don't want to make a federal case out of it. The music exists, and Miles is getting the royalties." Evans also alleged that when he suggested that he was entitled to a share of the royalties, Davis wrote him a check for $25.

Drummer Jimmy Cobb said, "Actually, a lot of that stuff [for Kind of Blue] was composed in conjunction with Bill Evans." Likewise, Evans' friend the composer Earl Zindars, in an interview conducted by Win Hinkle in 1993, stated that "Blue in Green" was indeed "100-percent Bill's". He added, "I know that [one] is because he wrote it over at my pad where I was staying in East Harlem, 5th floor walkup, and he stayed until 3 o'clock in the morning playing these six bars over and over." As Peter Pettinger notes, Zindars also had "sketches to prove it".

In addition, in a recording made in December 1958 for Chet Baker's album Chet (several months prior to the Kind of Blue sessions), Evans' introduction to the jazz standard "Alone Together" consists of the same chords as the intro to "Blue in Green".

== Personnel ==
Kind of Blue recording (2 March 1959)

- Miles Davis – trumpet
- John Coltrane – tenor saxophone
- Bill Evans – piano
- Paul Chambers – double bass
- Jimmy Cobb – drums

Portrait in Jazz recording (28 December 1959)

- Bill Evans - piano
- Scott LaFaro - double bass
- Paul Motian - drums

== Legacy ==
Evans retained "Blue in Green" in his repertoire throughout the rest of his career. In addition to two alternate takes from the Portrait in Jazz session, at least nine later "unofficial" recordings by Evans made between 1960 and 1979 are currently in circulation. There is also the 1978 studio recording with Toots Thielemans on the album Affinity, where it is mislabeled "Blue And Green".

The piece has subsequently become a jazz standard and has been recorded by many artists, including Franco Ambrosetti (1965), John McLaughlin (1970), Kevin Eubanks (1982), Art Farmer (1983), Ralph Towner with Gary Burton (1985), Cassandra Wilson (1986, with her own lyrics), Fred Hersch (1986), Gonzalo Rubalcaba (1991), Tierney Sutton (2001, with lyrics by Meredith d'Ambrosio), Kenny Burrell (2003), Eliane Elias (2008), Marian McPartland (2008), Jacky Terrasson (2015), Jack DeJohnette with Ravi Coltrane (2016), and many others.

Vibraphonist Gary Burton observed:

If I was going to sit down and write a tune, it would have ten times more stuff going on than this. Yet [Evans] made a memorable tune out of just practically nothing. I'm always impressed by someone who can write a very minimal piece that sticks in your mind and that's still interesting to play over and over again.

And the jazz critic Ted Gioia notes:

I greatly admire this piece, but don't really consider it a song. It's more of a meditation .... The composition is ten bars long, which is quite unusual for jazz, an idiom that tends to thrive in 8-, 12-, or 16-bar increments. As a result, the ear is deceived when it reaches the end of the form of "Blue in Green." It is expecting another two or four bars, but instead the composition slides back to the start. ... Despite its popularity, musicians need to be brave to call [it] at a gig. "Blue in Green" has no catchy hooks or flamboyant interludes, and unless you have earned a chamber music reverence from the audience, you run the risk of losing their attention. ... [I]n the right setting with listeners who are willing to participate in a collective meditation, this work can be a springboard for an experience that almost transcends jazz.
