= Sunday at the Village Vanguard =

Live album by the Bill Evans Trio
- Released: October 1961
- Recorded: June 25, 1961
- Venue: Village Vanguard, New York City
- Genre: Jazz
- Length: 42:03
- Label: Riverside; RLP-376
- Producer: Orrin Keepnews

Bill Evans chronology
| Explorations (1961) | Sunday at the Village Vanguard (1961) | Waltz for Debby (1962) |

Sunday at the Village Vanguard is a live album by jazz pianist and composer Bill Evans and his Trio consisting of Evans, bassist Scott LaFaro, and drummer Paul Motian. Released in 1961, the album is routinely ranked as one of the best live jazz recordings of all time.

== History ==
Sunday at the Village Vanguard was drawn from material recorded on June 25, 1961, at the Village Vanguard in New York City. The trio played five sets—two in the afternoon and three in the evening—each one comprising four or five numbers and lasting about half an hour. This was the last performance by the Bill Evans Trio with bassist Scott LaFaro, who was killed in a car accident eleven days after the recording.

Riverside had been looking for only one album from this date, but LaFaro's death changed the economics. The album was subtitled "Featuring Scott LaFaro" and was rushed out for release three months after recording by September 1961. Evans and producer Orrin Keepnews reportedly selected the tracks for Sunday at the Village Vanguard to best feature LaFaro's masterly performance on bass, beginning and ending with two tracks ("Gloria's Step" and "Jade Visions") written by LaFaro himself, and with all the others featuring solos by him.

This memorable day's performance resulted in additional material released in a second album in 1962, Waltz for Debby, as well as a further selection of takes appearing posthumously in 1984 as another LP: Bill Evans — More From the Vanguard (Milestone M-9125).

In numerous interviews Evans has paid tribute to what he always considered to be his finest trio:

I am thankful that we recorded that day, because it was the last time I saw Scott and the last time we would play together. When you have evolved a concept of playing which depends on the specific personalities of outstanding players, how do you start again when they are gone?

After this recording at the Village Vanguard and the death of LaFaro, it became one of the extreme low periods in the life and career of Evans. He did not play for many months, not even at home.

== Reception ==
Professional ratings
Review scores
| Source | Rating |
|---|---|
| Down Beat (Original LP version) | 4/5 stars |
| AllMusic | 5/5 stars |
| Penguin Guide to Jazz | 👑 |
| All About Jazz | 5/5 stars |
| The Rolling Stone Jazz Record Guide | 5/5 stars |
| Encyclopedia of Popular Music | 5/5 stars |

Writing for AllMusic, music critic Thom Jurek wrote of the album: "This trio is still widely regarded as his finest, largely because of the symbiotic interplay between its members. This is a great place to begin with Evans." C. Michael Bailey of All About Jazz wrote: "Along with bassist wunderkind Scott LaFaro and drummer Paul Motian, Evans perfected his democratic vision of trio cooperation, where all members performed with perfect empathy and telepathy... It is these performances, currently available as Sunday at the Village Vanguard and Waltz for Debby that comprise the number one best jazz live recording in this present series."

Starting in 1992, both this album and its successor Waltz for Debby have been awarded a crown in all nine editions of The Penguin Guide to Jazz Recordings. In 2000, it was voted number 946 in Colin Larkin's All Time Top 1000 Albums. In 2005, the album was included in Robert Dimery's 1001 Albums You Must Hear Before You Die.

== Reissue ==
In 2005, Riverside issued The Complete Village Vanguard Recordings, 1961 a fully remastered three-CD box set containing virtually all the material from the entire day's recording at the Village Vanguard (one number has been lost) on that date of 25 June. While all of this music was already available on the 12-CD box-set released in 1984 Bill Evans - The Complete Riverside Recording, this re-issue has had the audience ambiance enhanced and includes introductions, on-stage discussions between the musicians, interaction with the audience, and a few bars of music that Evans improvised to fill out the tape at the end of the night.

== Track listing ==
Side one

1. "Gloria's Step" (take 2) (Scott LaFaro) – 6:09
2. "My Man's Gone Now" (George Gershwin) – 6:21
3. "Solar" (Miles Davis) – 8:52

Side two

1. "Alice in Wonderland" (take 2) (Sammy Fain) – 8:34
2. "All of You" (take 2) (Cole Porter) – 8:17
3. "Jade Visions" (take 2) (Scott LaFaro) – 3:44

Bonus tracks on CD

7. "Gloria's Step" (take 3) – 6:54
8. "Alice in Wonderland" (take 1) – 6:59
9. "All of You" (take 3) – 8:03
10. "Jade Visions" (take 1) – 4:16

== Personnel ==
- Bill Evans – piano
- Scott LaFaro – bass
- Paul Motian – drums

== Credits ==
- Orrin Keepnews – Producer
- Dave Jones – Recording engineer
- Ken Deardoff – Album design
- Donald Silverstein – Album cover photograph
- Steve Schapiro – Back liner photograph ("The trio, between sets, in the back room at the Vanguard")
- Ira Gitler and Orrin Keepnews – Liner notes
