= Affinity (Bill Evans album) =

Studio album by Bill Evans
- Released: April 11, 1979
- Recorded: October 30–November 2, 1978
- Genre: Jazz
- Length: 42:36
- Label: Warner Bros.
- Producer: Helen Keane

Bill Evans chronology
New Conversations (1978)	Affinity (1979)	We Will Meet Again (1979)

Affinity is an album by American jazz pianist Bill Evans released in 1979, featuring Belgian harmonica player Toots Thielemans. Evans plays a Rhodes piano on some of the tracks, and saxophonist and flutist Larry Schneider appears on some of them as well. The album represents the recording debut of bassist Marc Johnson, and drummer Eliot Zigmund, who had left the trio the previous year, puts in a guest appearance as a studio musician.

Evans said of Thielemans, "He is the only harmonica player in jazz. And I just love his whole feeling for music and melody. How he does it on a harmonica, nobody will ever know. I have stopped trying to figure it out." Thielemans had worked with singer-songwriter Paul Simon and introduced his ballad "I Do It for Your Love" (from the album Still Crazy After All These Years) to Evans, who reharmonized it, recorded it here as the opening track, and made it a prominent part of his repertoire during the last two years of his life. Affinity also features a new version of "Blue in Green" from Kind of Blue, although it is mislabeled as "Blue And Green" on the back cover.

In addition, the album includes the Henry Mancini song "Days of Wine and Roses," which Evans had previously recorded with Tony Bennett; "The Other Side of Midnight" (aka "Noelle's Theme") by Michel Legrand, whose works appear on many of the pianist's albums from this period; and Evans's only recording as a leader of the jazz standard "Body and Soul."

== Reception ==
DownBeat gave the album 4 stars. Reviewer Leslie Ladd wrote, "On Affinity Evans’ seriousness and Thielemans’ humor counterbalance . . . The over-all effect is like a candy sampler: lots to choose from, but all equally tasty".

Scott Yanow on AllMusic calls it "Excellent if not essential music that Evans generally uplifts."

Evans biographer Keith Shadwick says that "Thielmans's unabashedly emotional playing and his forthright approach spurs Evans into some of his most assertive piano playing on record. ... Thielemans is at his most persuasive on 'Body and Soul', using his full, lush tone, and Evans is strikingly imaginative in his accompaniment."

Professional ratings
Review scores
Source	Rating
Allmusic	3/5 stars
The Rolling Stone Jazz Record Guide	4/5 stars
The Penguin Guide to Jazz Recordings	3/4 stars
DownBeat	4/5 stars

== Track listing ==
1. "I Do It for Your Love" (Paul Simon) – 7:16
2. "Sno' Peas" (Phil Markowitz) – 5:51
3. "This Is All I Ask" (Gordon Jenkins) – 4:14
4. "Days of Wine and Roses" (Henry Mancini, Johnny Mercer) – 6:40
5. "Jesus' Last Ballad" (Gianni Bedori) – 5:52
6. "Tomato Kiss" (Larry Schneider) – 5:17
7. "The Other Side of Midnight (Noelle's Theme)" (Michel Legrand) – 3:17
8. "Blue And Green" (aka "Blue in Green") (Miles Davis, Bill Evans) – 4:09
9. "Body & Soul" (Edward Heyman, Robert Sour, Frank Eyton, Johnny Green) – 6:16

== Personnel ==
- Bill Evans – keyboards
- Toots Thielemans – harmonica
- Marc Johnson – bass
- Eliot Zigmund – drums
- Larry Schneider – flute, soprano saxophone, & tenor saxophone

Production notes

- Helen Keane – producer
- Frank Laico – engineer

== Chart positions ==
Year	Chart	Position
1979	Billboard Jazz Albums	18
