= Waltz for Debby (song) =

Song by Bill Evans

from the album New Jazz Conceptions
- Released: 1956
- Genre: Jazz
- Length: 1:20
- Composer: Bill Evans
- Lyricist: Gene Lees

"Waltz for Debby" is a jazz standard composed by pianist Bill Evans, which became "his most famous tune". He first recorded it as a brief solo piano piece on his debut album, New Jazz Conceptions (1956). "Debby" in the composition's title refers to Evans's then 3-year-old niece, Debby Evans, whom he often took to the beach.

The "definitive performance" of the piece is usually considered to be the live recording from the third set on 25 June 1961 at the Village Vanguard by the classic Bill Evans Trio featuring bassist Scott LaFaro and drummer Paul Motian. (It was also recorded as part of the second set, and that less famous version, take 1, has been made available on various releases as a bonus track.)

Beginning of Waltz for Debby

In October 1963, Swedish poet Beppe Wolgers gave the song Swedish lyrics for jazz singer Monica Zetterlund, who in November 1963 released the song under the title "Monicas vals" on her EP Visa från Utanmyra. During a tour of Sweden with his trio in 1964, Evans heard the EP and was so impressed by Zetterlund's treatment of his waltz that a recording session was set up in Stockholm at the end of the tour in August 1964, in which his trio, then including Chuck Israels on bass and Larry Bunker on drums, accompanied her when she performed that version for the album Waltz for Debby: Monica Zetterlund, Bill Evans, which was released in December 1964 and contained nine additional English and Swedish songs.

In September 1964, a month after Evans's recording in Sweden, Evans's friend Gene Lees gave the waltz English lyrics for Tony Bennett's album Who Can I Turn To, released in November 1964. In June 1975, Evans eventually accompanied Bennett when he sang the English version (the only time Evans made a recording with the Gene Lees lyrics) for The Tony Bennett/Bill Evans Album, which was released in July 1975.

Including many posthumous releases, several dozen recordings of the waltz by Evans are now in circulation. His final recording of it dates from 7 September 1980, live at the Keystone Korner, just eight days before he died.

The waltz has been widely covered and recorded more than 300 times. Ted Gioia notes that in about 20% of cover versions, "Debby" is misspelled as "Debbie". "Waltz for Debby" is known in Finnish by the name "Ankin Valssi", with lyrics written by Jukka Kuoppamäki.

Evans had a particular fondness for the waltz form: Of his 50+ original compositions, at least 10 are waltzes, including "Very Early" (1949), "G Waltz" (1967), "B Minor Waltz" (1977), and "We Will Meet Again" (1977), and he frequently performed waltzes by others, such as Earl Zindars's "Elsa" and Gary McFarland's "Gary's Theme".

== Personnel ==
On New Jazz Conceptions (1956):

- Bill Evans – piano

On Waltz for Debby (1961):

- Bill Evans – piano
- Scott LaFaro – bass
- Paul Motian – drums

== Renditions ==
=== Some Notable Recordings by Evans ===
- New Jazz Conceptions (1956)
- Know What I Mean? (March 1961, Cannonball Adderley with Bill Evans)
- Waltz for Debby (June 1961) (The track also appears on The Complete Village Vanguard Recordings, 1961, along with an alternate take)
- Waltz for Debby (1964, with Monica Zetterlund)
- You're Gonna Hear From Me (recorded 1969, released 1988)
- The Bill Evans Album (1971)
- The Tony Bennett/Bill Evans Album (1975)
- Bill Evans: Marian McPartland's Piano Jazz (1978, released 1989)
- His Last Concert in Germany (recorded 1980, released 1989)

=== Some Notable Recordings by Others ===
- Oscar Peterson – Affinity (1962)
- Johnny Hartman – The Voice That Is! (1964)
- Earl Klugh – Earl Klugh (album) (1976)
- Ahmad Jamal – Live at Bubba's (1980)
- George Shearing – Bill Evans: A Tribute by various pianists (1982)
- David Benoit – This Side Up (1985), Standards (2006) and Heroes (2008)
- the Kronos Quartet with Eddie Gómez – Music of Bill Evans (1986)
- Ellyn Rucker – This Heart of Mine (1989)
- Ralph Towner – Open Letter (1991)
- John McLaughlin – Time Remembered: John McLaughlin Plays Bill Evans (1993)
- Jean-Yves Thibaudet – Conversations with Bill Evans (1997, transcribed by Jed Distler from Evans's 1978 performance on McPartland's show)
- Don Sebesky – I Remember Bill: A Tribute to Bill Evans (1998)
- Tierney Sutton – Blue in Green (2001, medley with "Tiffany")
- Chick Corea and Gary Burton – The New Crystal Silence (2008)
- Eliane Elias – Something for You: Eliane Elias Sings & Plays Bill Evans (2008)
- The Four Freshmen – The Four Freshmen: Featuring Emmet Cohen, Russell Hall, & Kyle Poole (Four Freshmen Society, 2022)
- Allen Toussaint – American Tunes (2016)

== Awards ==
- Don Sebesky: Grammy Award for Best Instrumental Arrangement (from I Remember Bill: A Tribute to Bill Evans, 1999)
- Gary Burton and Chick Corea: Grammy Award for Best Jazz Instrumental Solo (from The New Crystal Silence, 2008)
