= Turn Out the Stars: The Final Village Vanguard Recordings =

Live album by Bill Evans
- Released: 1996
- Recorded: June 4, 5, 6 & 8, 1980
- Genre: Jazz
- Length: 397:38
- Label: Warner Bros.
- Producer: Jeff Levinson and Bill Kirchner

Turn Out the Stars: The Final Village Vanguard Recordings is a six-CD box set live album by jazz pianist Bill Evans with Marc Johnson and Joe LaBarbera recorded over four nights at the Village Vanguard in New York City in 1980 and released on CD on the Warner Bros. label in 1996. A concurrent LP release was made on Mosaic.

== Reception ==
The Allmusic review by Scott Yanow awarded the album 4 stars and stated: "Evans sounded quite energized during his last year, Johnson was developing quickly as both an accompanist and a soloist, and the interplay by the trio members (with subtle support from LaBarbera) sometimes bordered on the telepathic. The playing throughout these consistently inventive performances ranks up there with the Evans-Scott LaFaro-Paul Motian trio of 20 years earlier".

Professional ratings
Review scores
| Source | Rating |
|---|---|
| Allmusic | 4/5 stars |
| The Penguin Guide to Jazz Recordings | 3.5/4 stars |

== Track listing ==
All compositions by Bill Evans except as indicated

Disc One

1. "Bill's Hit Tune" - 7:47
2. "Nardis" (Miles Davis) - 15:37
3. "If You Could See Me Now" (Tadd Dameron, Carl Sigman) - 5:42
4. "The Two Lonely People" (Evans, Carol Hall) - 7:10
5. "Laurie" - 6:32
6. "My Romance" (Lorenz Hart, Richard Rodgers) - 7:47
7. "Tiffany" - 5:41
8. "Like Someone in Love" (Johnny Burke, Jimmy Van Heusen) - 7:34
9. "Letter to Evan" - 5:22

Disc Two

1. "Days of Wine and Roses " (Henry Mancini, Johnny Mercer) - 8:59
2. "Emily" (Johnny Mandel, Johnny Mercer) - 4:09
3. "My Foolish Heart" (Ned Washington, Victor Young) - 4:10
4. "Nardis" (Davis) - 16:17
5. "Yet Ne'er Broken" - 6:36
6. "Quiet Now" (Denny Zeitlin) - 5:11
7. "But Not for Me" (George Gershwin, Ira Gershwin) - 7:55
8. "Spring Is Here" (Hart, Rodgers) - 4:21
9. "Autumn Leaves" (Joseph Kosma, Jacques Prévert, Johnny Mercer) - 5:05

Disc Three

1. "Your Story" - 3:58
2. "Re: Person I Knew" - 4:32
3. "Polka Dots and Moonbeams (Burke, Van Heusen) - 6:24
4. "The Two Lonely People" (Evans, Hall) - 7:08
5. "Theme from M*A*S*H" (Mike Altman, Johnny Mandel) - 4:07
6. "Tiffany" - 5:25
7. "Turn Out the Stars" - 6:21
8. "Laurie"- 6:23
9. "My Romance" (Hart, Rodgers) - 8:19
10. "Knit for Mary F." - 6:13
11. " Midnight Mood" (Ben Raleigh, Joe Zawinul) - 5:50
12. "Time Remembered" - 5:37

Disc Four

1. "Days of Wine and Roses" (Mancini, Mercer) - 8:49
2. "Up With the Lark" (Jerome Kern, Leo Robin) - 5:13
3. "Nardis" (Davis) - 15:02
4. "Your Story" - 3:54
5. "Yet Ne'er Broken" - 6:48
6. "If You Could See Me Now" (Dameron, Sigman) - 6:18
7. "Bill's Hit Tune"- 7:49
8. "Tiffany" - 4:56
9. "In Your Own Sweet Way" (Dave Brubeck) - 9:57

Disc Five

1. "I Do It for Your Love" (Paul Simon) - 5:16
2. "Five" - 4:07
3. "Polka Dots and Moonbeams" (Burke, Van Heusen) - 5:58
4. "Bill's Hit Tune" - 8:53
5. "Turn Out the Stars" - 5:53
6. "Days of Wine and Roses" (Mancini, Mercer) - 7:33
7. "But Not for Me" (Gershwin, Gershwin) - 6:57
8. "Knit for Mary F." - 6:25
9. "Like Someone in Love" (Burke, Van Heusen) - 7:33
10. "Quiet Now" (Zeitlin) - 5:13

Disc Six

1. "Emily" (Mandel, Mercer) - 4:16
2. "I Do It for Your Love"(Simon) - 5:36
3. "Nardis" (Davis) - 15:54
4. "Knit for Mary F." - 6:01
5. "Like Someone in Love" (Burke, Van Heusen) - 6:21
6. "Letter to Evan" - 6:55
7. "Minha (All Mine)" (Francis Hime, Ruy Guerra) - 3:17
8. "A Sleepin' Bee" (Harold Arlen, Truman Capote) - 4:23
9. "My Romance/Five" (Hart, Rodgers/Evans) - 10:09

- Recorded at the Village Vanguard in New York on June 4 (Disc One tracks 1–3), June 5 (Disc One tracks 4–9 & Disc Two), June 6 (Disc Three, Disc Four & Disc Five tracks 1–2) and June 8 (Disc Five tracks 3–10 & Disc Six), 1980.

== Personnel ==
- Bill Evans - piano
- Marc Johnson - bass
- Joe LaBarbera - drums
