= Roy Eaton =

American pianist and advertising creative (born 1930)

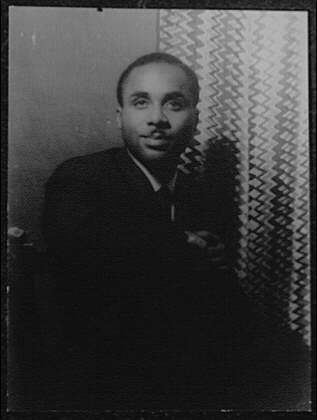

Background information
- Born: May 14, 1930 (age 96)
- Origin: United States
- Occupations: Pianist and advertising creative

Roy Eaton (born May 14, 1930) is an American pianist and advertising creative. He is cited as the first black American prominent in the field of advertising.

== Life ==
The son of Jamaican immigrants, Eaton grew up in Harlem, New York. His father was a mechanic and his mother a governess. He took up classical piano when he was six and shortly after, in 1937, played at Carnegie Hall, winning the gold medal in a Music Education League competition. In June 1950, he won the first Kosciuszko Foundation Chopin Award. He made his concert debut with the Chicago Symphony Orchestra performing Chopin’s F Minor Concerto under George Schick in 1951. He was reengaged to perform Beethoven’s 4th the following season, and also made his New York Town Hall debut in 1952.

His education included the City College of New York, the Manhattan School of Music, the University of Zurich, and Yale; he subsequently became a music instructor at the Manhattan School of Music.

He was drafted for two years into the U.S. Army at the time of the Korean War, serving all of that time in a hospital radio station, WFDH in Fort Dix, NJ, where he wrote and produced radio and TV programs.

In 1955, on leaving the Army, Eaton was taken on as a copywriter and composer at Young & Rubicam, and in his first two years created 75 percent of all the music produced there. In 1957, physicians gave him a 10 percent chance of surviving an automobile accident in Utah that left him comatose and killed his wife of under one year. He worked almost three decades in advertising, with Young & Rubicam, Benton & Bowles, and later his own company, Roy Eaton Music Inc.

In 1986, he returned to regular concert performance at Alice Tully Hall, in Lincoln Center, with a unique program format, "The Meditative Chopin", a subsequent "The Meditative Chopin II" in 1987 and a third recital in the same hall in 1992. Eaton is a long-time practitioner of Transcendental Meditation, having begun in 1968. He was inducted into the Advertising Hall of Fame in 2010. After suffering a stroke in 2017, Eaton has continued to perform.
