= Chuck Israels =

American jazz musician

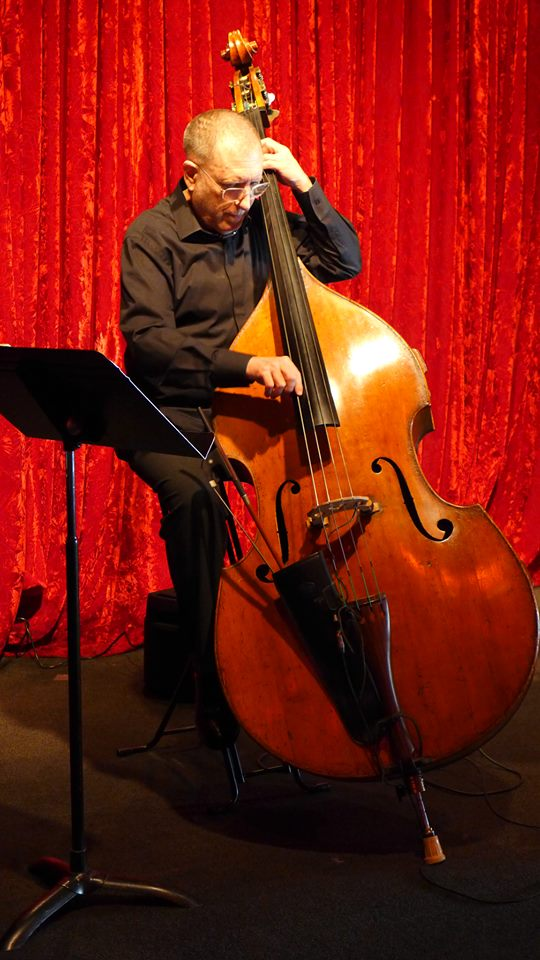
- Israels in 2014

Background information
- Born: Charles H. Israels; August 10, 1936 (age 90); New York City, U.S.
- Origin: New York City, New York, U.S
- Genres: Jazz, cool jazz
- Occupations: Musician, composer, arranger
- Instrument: Double bass
- Website: chuckisraelsjazz.com

The Public Domain Song Anthology with Modern and Traditional Harmonization, a 2020 book co-edited by Israels

Charles H. Israels (born August 10, 1936) is an American jazz composer, arranger, and bassist who is best known for his work with the Bill Evans Trio. He has also worked with Billie Holiday, Benny Goodman, Coleman Hawkins, Stan Getz, Herbie Hancock, J. J. Johnson, John Coltrane, and Judy Collins. He has won one Grammy Award in 2020 for his work on mezzo-soprano Joyce DiDonato's album Songplay.

== Biography ==
Born in New York City, Chuck Israels was raised in a musical family that moved to Cleveland, Ohio, when he was 10 years old. His stepfather Mordecai Bauman was a singer who performed extensively with composer Hanns Eisler. He, along with Israels's mother, Irma Commanday, created a home environment in which music was a part of normal daily activity. Paul Robeson, Pete Seeger, and The Weavers were visitors to the Bauman home. In 1948, the appearance of Louis Armstrong's All Stars in a concert series produced by his parents gave him his first opportunity to meet and hear jazz musicians.

In college, Israels had the opportunity to perform with Billie Holiday. His first professional job after college was working with pianist Bud Powell in Paris. His first professional recording was Stereo Drive (aka Coltrane Time) with John Coltrane, Cecil Taylor, Kenny Dorham, and Louis Hayes. The recording showcased Israels as a composer with his composition "Double Clutching". Israels is best known for his work with the Bill Evans Trio from 1961 through 1966, having replaced the deceased Scott LaFaro, and for the Jazz Repertory as Director of the National Jazz Ensemble from 1973 to 1981. He made recordings with Kronos Quartet and Rosemary Clooney in 1985. He was the Director of Jazz Studies at Western Washington University in Bellingham, Washington until 2010. In 2011, he created the Chuck Israels Jazz Orchestra and recorded Second Wind: A Tribute to the Music of Bill Evans in 2013. In 2020, Israels received a Grammy Award for his work on mezzo-soprano Joyce DiDonato's album Songplay.

Humphrey Lyttelton, presenting Jazz 625 in 1965, said that Israels was "a superb technician who handles the double bass as easily as if it were a guitar... Chuck Israels is one of the reasons why musicians have come reeling away from performances by the Bill Evans Trio in a mood poised between elation and utter despair."

In the 1970s, singer/songwriter Paul Simon studied harmony/music theory with Israels prior to recording his album Still Crazy After All These Years (1975), and Simon credits Israel with influencing him to write songs for the album that were more harmonically complex. Israels is thanked on the back cover of the album.

== Discography ==
=== As leader ===
Year	Album	Group
1976	National Jazz Ensemble Vol. 2	National Jazz Ensemble
1992	Meeting on Hvar	Chuck Israels International Trio
1998	The Eindhoven Concert	Chuck Israels and the Metropole Orchestra with Claudio Roditi
1999	The Bellingham Sessions	Chuck Israels Quartet
2013	Chaconne a Son Gout	Chuck Israels Quartet
2008	Convergence	Chuck Israels Trio
2012	It's Nice to Be with You	Chuck Israels Trio
2013	Second Wind: A Tribute to the Music of Bill Evans	Chuck Israels Jazz Orchestra
1975	National Jazz Ensemble	National Jazz Ensemble
2015	Joyful Noise: The Music of Horace Silver	Chuck Israels Jazz Orchestra
2016	Garden of Delights	Chuck Israels Jazz Orchestra

=== As sideman ===
Year	Album	Main Artist
1976	End of a Rainbow	Patti Austin
1963	Something's Coming!	Gary Burton
1959	Stereo Drive (aka Coltrane Time)	Cecil Taylor
1985	Rosemary Clooney Sings Ballads	Rosemary Clooney
1961	Eric Dolphy in Europe	Eric Dolphy
1962	Nirvana	Bill Evans and Herbie Mann
1962	Moon Beams	Bill Evans
1962	How My Heart Sings!	Bill Evans
1962	Time Remembered	Bill Evans
1964	The Bill Evans Trio "Live"	Bill Evans
1963	At Shelly's Manne-Hole	Bill Evans
1964	Waltz for Debby	Bill Evans, Monica Zetterlund
1964	The Judy Collins Concert	Judy Collins
1965	Trio '65	Bill Evans
1965	Bill Evans Trio with Symphony Orchestra	Bill Evans
1966	Bill Evans at Town Hall	Bill Evans
1961	A Day in the City	Don Friedman
1962	Circle Waltz	Don Friedman
1964	Getz Au Go Go	Stan Getz
1965	Here and Now	Hampton Hawes
1963	My Point of View	Herbie Hancock
1963	Impressions of Cleopatra	Paul Horn
1963	J. J.'s Broadway	J. J. Johnson
1963	New Jazz on Campus	Paul Winter
1960	George Russell Sextet at the Five Spot	George Russell
1960	Stratusphunk	George Russell
1961	George Russell Sextet in K.C.	George Russell
1963	Eddie Costa: Memorial Concert	Coleman Hawkins and Clark Terry
1966	The Doors of Perception	Dave Pike
1973	Mizrab	Gábor Szabó
1974	Phoebe Snow	Phoebe Snow
1985	Monk Suite: Kronos Quartet Plays Music of Thelonious Monk	Kronos Quartet
1978	Baltimore	Nina Simone
1998	An Evening With Herb Ellis	Herb Ellis
2010	Barry Harris in Spain	Barry Harris
2005	Strictly Confidential	Jon Mayer
1965	Fifth Album	Judy Collins
1966	No Dirty Names	Dave Van Ronk
