= My Romance (song) =

Song
- Published: 1935
- Composer: Richard Rodgers
- Lyricist: Lorenz Hart

"My Romance" is a popular jazz song, with music by Richard Rodgers and lyrics by Lorenz Hart, written for Billy Rose's musical, Jumbo (1935). Gloria Grafton and Donald Novis introduced the song in that musical.

In the 1962 movie version of Jumbo, Doris Day performed the song.

The song's lyrics describe a romantic attraction between two people, often by listing common romantic elements or backdrops that are not needed to make this attraction work. In turn, the singer states that the romance does not need a certain setting ("a moon in the sky"), location ("a blue lagoon"), or stereotypical musical accompaniment to a date ("soft guitars"), due to the strong attraction they feel to the person. Later in the song, the singer states that they do not need a castle in Spain or a dance to make the attraction work. Finally, the singer declares that their attraction has rendered them "wide awake", and they realize that the beloved can make all their dreams come true just with themselves.

== Other versions ==
- Dave Brubeck – The Dave Brubeck Quartet (1952)
- Bill Evans – The Complete Village Vanguard (1961)
- Doris Day – 1962
- Ben Webster with Hank Jones – Ben and Sweets (1962)
- Art Blakey with Keith Jarrett – Buttercorn Lady (1966)
- Hampton Hawes - 1968
- Chris Botti – When I Fall in Love (2004)
- Aaron Tveit – The Radio in My Head: Live at 54 Below (2013)

== See also ==
- List of 1930s jazz standards
