= Orrin Keepnews =

American record producer (1923–2015)

Background information
- Born: March 2, 1923; The Bronx, New York, U.S.
- Died: March 1, 2015 (aged 91) El Cerrito, California, U.S.
- Genre: Jazz
- Occupations: Record producer, writer
- Years active: 1952–2015
- Labels: Riverside, Milestone, Fantasy, Landmark Records
- Formerly of: Thelonious Monk, Bill Evans, Cannonball & Nat Adderley, Wes Montgomery, Johnny Griffin, Jimmy Heath, McCoy Tyner, Joe Henderson, Lee Konitz, Gary Bartz, Blue Mitchell

Orrin Keepnews (March 2, 1923 – March 1, 2015) was an American jazz writer and record producer known for founding Riverside Records and Milestone Records, for freelance work, and for his work at other labels.

== Biography ==
=== Early life ===
Keepnews was born to a Jewish family in The Bronx, New York, on March 2, 1923. His mother was a public school teacher and his father worked for the Department of Welfare. Keepnews graduated from Columbia University with a degree in English in 1943. At Columbia, Orrin Keepnews was a member of the Philolexian Society. Subsequently, he was involved in bombing raids over Japan in the final months of World War II, before returning for graduate studies at Columbia in 1946.

While working as an editor for the book publishers Simon & Schuster, Keepnews moonlighted as editor of The Record Changer, a small jazz magazine, after fellow Columbia graduate Bill Grauer became its owner in 1948. Keepnews wrote one of the earliest profiles of Thelonious Monk, then little known, for the publication.

In 1954 and 1955 Grauer and Keepnews produced a series of reissues on RCA Victor's X label.

=== Riverside Records ===
In 1953, Grauer and Keepnews founded Riverside Records, which was initially devoted to reissue projects in the traditional and swing jazz idioms. "It was an act of more than moderate lunacy, to start a business on nothing but enthusiasm", he once said years later. "We had the arrogance of ignorance."

Pianist Randy Weston was the first modern jazz artist signed by the label as a conscious move into the jazz scene of the day. According to Keepnews, Grauer heard him at the Music Inn in the Berkshires, Massachusetts, in 1953, and persuaded his partner to sign him after Keepnews had heard Weston for himself, after which Keepnews learned not to question Grauer's musical taste.

Their most significant early move came in 1955, when they were made aware of the availability of Thelonious Monk, who was able to terminate his contract with Prestige Records and sign with Riverside. Monk was not easy for Keepnews to work with: "He was as demanding of other people as he was of himself, but he was self-contained and also impatient. He knew what he wanted, but I didn't, so I had to catch on to this express train as it went roaring by,"

With Keepnews as producer, and adding such artists as Bill Evans, Cannonball and Nat Adderley, Wes Montgomery, Johnny Griffin and Jimmy Heath, the label soon rivaled Prestige and Blue Note Records as a leading New York-based independent jazz label. In 1961, Keepnews produced the highly regarded live jazz recordings of the first Bill Evans Trio, Sunday at the Village Vanguard and Waltz for Debby.

During this period, Grauer concentrated on business affairs, which ultimately proved to be marred by "creative accounting". In mid-December 1963, Grauer died following a sudden heart attack, and Keepnews was unable to save the company from the bankruptcy that followed in mid-1964.

=== Milestone and Fantasy Records ===
After a period of freelance activity, Keepnews started Milestone Records in 1966 with a new business partner, pianist Dick Katz. Among their most significant artists over the next few years were McCoy Tyner, Joe Henderson, Lee Konitz, and Gary Bartz.

Late in 1972, Keepnews relocated to San Francisco as director of jazz A&R at Fantasy Records, which had just acquired the bulk of Riverside's masters. Milestone was bought by Fantasy in the same year, and signed Sonny Rollins, whom Keepnews had worked with at Riverside. At Fantasy, Keepnews oversaw the repackaging of the company's holdings in the idiom as "twofer"s, including many albums he had produced at Riverside. Bill Evans, whose 1962 song "Re: Person I Knew" is a tribute to Keepnews (the title is an anagram of his name), joined Fantasy at this time, reuniting their previous partnership; however his manager, Helen Keane, later a successful producer in her own right, took charge of Evans's recording projects. After resigning as Vice-President of Fantasy in 1980 because, as he said, "even under the best of circumstances, I can't be happy working for someone else," Keepnews returned to freelancing.

=== Later career ===
In 1985, Keepnews founded Landmark Records, whose catalog included albums recorded by the Kronos Quartet of music by Bill Evans and Monk, as well as straight jazz albums. For Landmark, Bobby Hutcherson recorded his most extensive sequence of latter-day albums. Landmark passed to Muse Records in 1993.

Orrin Keepnews won several Recording Academy Grammy Awards in the 1980s: Best Album Notes for The "Interplay" Sessions performed by Bill Evans in 1984 and Best Historical Album and Best Album Notes for Thelonious Monk: The Complete Riverside Recordings in 1988. A collection of his writings, The View from Within, was published in 1988.

In the CD era Keepnews continued to be responsible for extensive reissue compilations, including the Duke Ellington 24-CD RCA Centennial set in 1999 and Riverside's Keepnews Editions series.

In 2004, Keepnews was given a Trustees Award for Lifetime Achievement by the National Academy of Recording Arts and Sciences. In June 2010, Keepnews received a 2011 NEA Jazz Masters lifetime achievement award from the National Endowment for the Arts in the field of jazz, including a stipend of $25,000.

=== Personal life ===
Keepnews died at the age of 91 on March 1, 2015, a day before his 92nd birthday, at his home in El Cerrito, California. He was married to the former Lucile Kaufman from 1948 until her death in 1989. He was survived by his second wife, a clothing designer, Martha Egan, and by his two sons, Peter Keepnews, an editor at The New York Times and a writer on jazz subjects; and David Keepnews, a retired nurse, attorney, professor, and policy analyst who is the former Executive Director of the Washington State Nurses Association.

== Bibliography ==
- Keepnews, Orrin; Grauer, Bill Jr. (1961). A Pictorial History Of Jazz: People and Places from New Orleans to Modern Jazz (4th ed.). Crown Publishing Group. ASIN B0019N6JA2.
- Keepnews, Orrin (1988). The View from Within: Jazz Writings, 1948–1987. Oxford University Press. ISBN 978-0195052848.

== See also ==
- Category:Albums produced by Orrin Keepnews
