= Brazil: Once Again =

Studio album by Herbie Mann
- Released: 1978
- Recorded: June 15, 1977; NYC
- Genre: Latin jazz, Crossover jazz, World fusion
- Length: 32:59
- Label: Atlantic; SD 19169
- Producer: Herbie Mann

Herbie Mann chronology
Herbie Mann & Fire Island (1977)	Brazil: Once Again (1978)	Super Mann (1978)

Brazil: Once Again is an album by jazz flautist Herbie Mann which was recorded in 1977 and released on the Atlantic label. The album marks Mann's return to the Brazilian influences that first emerged on his early 1960s albums like Right Now, Brazil, Bossa Nova & Blues, Do the Bossa Nova with Herbie Mann and Herbie Mann Live at Newport.

== Reception ==
Professional ratings
Review scores
Source	Rating
AllMusic	2/5 stars

Allmusic awarded the album 2 stars with its review by Scott Yanow stating: "the music is listenable but somewhat forgettable".

== Track listing ==
All compositions by Herbie Mann except as indicated

1. "Pele" - 6:32
2. "Oh How I Want to Love You" - 9:31
3. "Dingui Li Bangui" (J. D. San, MacDonys) - 4:35
4. "Lugar Comun (Common Place)" (João Donato, Gilberto Gil) - 4:45
5. "O Meu Amor Chorou (Cry of Love)" (Luis Marcal Neto) - 7:36

== Personnel ==
- Herbie Mann - flute
- Pat Rebillot - keyboards, arranger
- Jeff Mironov - guitar
- Amaury Tristão - acoustic guitar, percussion
- Tony Levin - bass
- Rick Marotta - drums
- Rubens Bassini, Reggie Ferguson, Armen Halburian, Ralph MacDonald, Dom Um Romão - percussion
- Alan Rubin, Lew Soloff - trumpet (track 3)
- Barry Rogers, Dave Taylor - trombone (track 3)
- Lew Del Gatto - baritone saxophone (track 3)
