= Our Mann Flute =

Studio album by Herbie Mann
- Released: 1966
- Recorded: August 3, 1960, February 13, May 7 and October 29, 1964, March 10 and May 26, 1966, NYC
- Genre: Jazz
- Label: Atlantic; SD 1464
- Producer: Nesuhi Ertegun

Herbie Mann chronology
Today! (1966)	Our Mann Flute (1966)	Impressions of the Middle East (1966)

Our Mann Flute is an album by American jazz flautist Herbie Mann released on the Atlantic label in 1966. The album features tracks from sessions that produced the albums The Common Ground (1960), My Kinda Groove (1964) along with more recent recordings.

== Reception ==
Professional ratings
Review scores
Source	Rating
Allmusic	3/5 stars

Allmusic awarded the album 3 stars.

== Track listing ==
1. "Scratch" (Wayne Henderson) – 2:32
2. "Philly Dog" (Rufus Thomas) – 2:26
3. "Happy Brass" (Herbie Mann) – 2:09
4. "Good Lovin'" (Rudy Clark, Arthur Resnick) – 2:54
5. "Theme from "This Is My Beloved"" (Mann) – 5:07
6. "Frère Jacques" (Traditional) – 2:14
7. "Our Man Flint" (Jerry Goldsmith) – 2:40
8. "Fiddler on the Roof" (Jerry Bock, Sheldon Harnick) – 2:21
9. "Theme from "Malamondo" (Funny World)" (Ennio Morricone) – 2:16
10. "Down by the Riverside" (Traditional) – 2:34
11. "Monday, Monday" (John Phillips) – 2:57
12. "Skip to My Lou" (Traditional) – 2:20
- Recorded in New York City on August 3, 1960 (track 3), February 13, 1964 (track 10), May 7, 1964 (track 5), October 29, 1964 (tracks 6, 8, 9 & 12), March 10, 1966 (track 7) and May 26, 1966 (tracks 1, 2, 4 & 11)

== Personnel ==
- Herbie Mann – flute – with multiple ensembles including:
- Leo Ball, Doc Cheatham, Al DeRisi, Jerome Kail, Marky Markowitz, Joe Newman, Jimmy Owens, Ernie Royal, Ziggy Schatz, Clark Terry, Snooky Young – trumpet
- Bob Alexander, Quentin Jackson, Jimmy Knepper, Joe Orange, Santo Russo, Chauncey Welsch – trombone
- Tony Studd – bass trombone
- Jerry Dodgion – flute, clarinet, alto saxophone
- Richie Kamuca – clarinet, tenor saxophone
- King Curtis – tenor saxophone, baritone saxophone
- Pepper Adams – baritone saxophone
- Dave Pike, Johnny Rae – vibraphone
- Don Friedman, Jimmy Wisner – piano
- Al Gorgoni, Mundell Lowe, Charles Macey, Attila Zoller – guitar
- Milt Hinton, Jack Six, Knobby Totah, Reggie Workman – bass
- Joe Mack – electric bass
- Bruno Carr, Rudy Collins, Bernard Purdie, Bobby Thomas – drums
- Willie Bobo, Gary Chester – timbales, percussion
- Ray Barretto, Warren Smith, Carlos "Patato" Valdes – congas
- Ray Mantilla – bongos
- Michael Olatunji – percussion, vocals
- George Devens – percussion
- Maya Angelou, Dolores Parker – vocals
- Anthony Bambino, Hinda Barnett, Emanuel Green, Harry Katzman, Leo Kruczek, Gene Orloff, Paul Winter – violin
- Charles McCracken, Kermit Moore – cello
- Herbie Mann (tracks 3, 10), Arif Mardin (track 7), Oliver Nelson (track 5), Richard Wess (tracks 6, 8, 9, 12), Jimmy Wisner (tracks 1, 2, 10, 11) – arranger, conductor
