= Monday Night at the Village Gate =

Live album by Herbie Mann
- Released: 1966
- Recorded: May 24, 1965
- Venue: The Village Gate, New York City
- Genre: Jazz
- Length: 32:36
- Label: Atlantic; SD 1462
- Producer: Nesuhi Ertegun

Herbie Mann chronology
Herbie Mann Plays The Roar of the Greasepaint – The Smell of the Crowd (1965)	Monday Night at the Village Gate (1966)	Latin Mann (1965)

Monday Night at the Village Gate is a live album by American jazz flutist Herbie Mann recorded at The Village Gate in 1965 and released on the Atlantic label the following year. The album follows Mann's two previously released recordings from the venue five years earlier Herbie Mann at the Village Gate and Herbie Mann Returns to the Village Gate. An additional track from the concert was released on Standing Ovation at Newport.

== Reception ==
Professional ratings
Review scores
Source	Rating
AllMusic	4/5 stars

AllMusic awarded the album 4 stars with its review noting "Mann's music was still based on the Latin jazz that he had spent years exploring, but rather than the frenetic beats of Afro-Cuban music or samba, the rhythmic pulse of these five tracks is decidedly more laid-back".

== Track listing ==
1. "Away from the Crowd" (Attila Zoller) - 6:41
2. "Motherless Child" (Traditional) - 8:04
3. "In Escambrun" (Zoller) - 5:40
4. "The Young Turks" (Arif Mardin) - 5:24
5. "You're Gonna Make It With Me" (Jack Hitchcock) - 6:47

== Personnel ==
- Herbie Mann - flute
- Jack Hitchcock, Mark Weinstein - trombone
- Dave Pike - vibraphone
- Chick Corea - piano
- Earl May - bass
- Bruno Carr - drums
- Carlos "Patato" Valdes - congas
