= Carlos "Patato" Valdes =

Cuban conga player (1926–2007)

Carlos "Patato" Valdés
- Also known as: Patato
- Born: Carlos Valdés Galán; November 4, 1926; Los Sitios, La Habana, Cuba
- Died: December 4, 2007 (aged 81) Cleveland, Ohio, US
- Genres: Cuban rumba, son cubano, big band, Afro-Cuban jazz
- Occupations: Musician, bandleader, composer, percussionist
- Instruments: Congas, percussion
- Years active: 1944–2007
- Labels: Panart, Blue Note, Verve, Latin Percussion
- Website: http://pmrecords.com/Patato.shtml

Carlos Valdés Galán (November 4, 1926 – December 4, 2007), better known as Patato, was a Cuban conga player. In 1954, he emigrated from La Habana to New York City where he continued his prolific career as a sideman for several jazz and Latin music ensembles, and occasionally as a bandleader. He contributed to the development of the tunable conga drum which revolutionized the use of the instrument in the US. His experimental descarga albums recorded for Latin Percussion are considered the counterpart to the commercial salsa boom of the 1970s. Tito Puente once called him "the greatest conguero alive today".

== Nicknames ==
Like most Cuban musicians, Carlos Valdés had several nicknames throughout his artistic career. Early on he was known as "El Toro" (The Bull) as a young dancer and boxer. In school he was known as "Patato" (Small) due to his short stature; more disrespectfully he was known as "Remache" and "Tampón de bañera" around his neighbourhood. While playing alongside Armando Peraza in Havana's Zombie Club, he was known as "El Zombie", "Zombito" or "Pequeño Zombie" (Little Zombie). Due to his dancing style he was known as "Pingüino" (Penguin). Nonetheless, "Patato" was the name that stuck and he carried this pseudonym to the US, where he was often miscredited as "Potato Valdez".

== Life ==
=== Early life and career ===
Carlos Valdés Galán was born in the neighbourhood of Los Sitios in La Habana on November 4, 1926. His father, Carlos Valdés Brito, was a tres player who was part of the seminal coro de clave Los Apaches, and author of the son "Maldita timidez" recorded by Sexteto Habanero. The rest of his family included many other musicians and santeros; his cousin was the singer Francisco Fellove aka "El Gran Fellove". Carlos soon followed his father footsteps, learning to play the tres and a wide variety of percussion instruments, including the marímbula, the botija, the shekere, the tambourine, the cajón and the double bass. He became a member of the comparsa Las sultanas in which he played the congas (tumbadoras). He became a master of the instrument at a young age, playing alongside other greats such as Mongo Santamaría, Cándido Camero, Julito Collazo and Armando Peraza. The latter was his neighbour and partner in the Conjunto Kubavana led by Alberto Ruiz. He was only 18 years old when he joined this band in 1944. He left the group in 1947 to join the well-known Sonora Matancera, where he stayed for a year. From 1949 to 1954 he played for the Conjunto Casino, one of the most popular bands in La Habana at the time. In 1952, they toured New York City, where fellow drummer Cándido Camero decided to stay. Patato would make the same decision two years later.

=== Exile ===
Attracted by New York's thriving jazz scene, Patato left Cuba indefinitely on October 5, 1954. His first full-length recording as a sideman was the notorious LP Afro-Cuban by Kenny Dorham. He went on to perform live alongside Mongo Santamaría and Tito Puente in Harlem. He then joined several ensembles, including those led by Willie Bobo, Machito and Charlie Palmieri. He recorded with jazz drummers Art Blakey, Art Taylor and Max Roach. By the early 1960s, Patato was amongst the most sought-after conga drummers in New York. His association with flautist and bandleader Herbie Mann would last over fifteen years. In 1959, the United States Department of State funded a trip for bandleader Herbie Mann to visit Africa, after they heard his version of "African Suite." The grueling 14-week tour took place between 12/31/1959 to 4/5/1960 featuring Mann (bandleader, flute and saxophone), Johnny Rae (vibraphone and arrangements), Don Payne (bass), Doc Cheatham (trumpet), Jimmy Knepper (trombone), Carlos "Patato" Valdés (congas) and José Mangual, Sr. (bongos). They toured Sierra Leone, Liberia, Nigeria, Mozambique, Rhodesia, Tanganyika, Kenya, Ethiopia, Sudan, Morocco and Tunisia.

Patato accompanied Dizzy Gillespie and Quincy Jones on extended tours throughout Europe. He acted in and composed the title song of The Bill Cosby Show. In 1977 he took part in the recording of Cachao's comeback albums. In 1991, he contributed to the movie soundtrack for The Mambo Kings Play Songs of Love. Patato was the leader of his own band, Afrojazzia, which toured Europe in the spring of 1994. In 1995 he recorded the album "Ritmo y candela" with fellow percussionists Changuito and Orestes Vilató. Similarly, together with Giovanni Hidalgo and Candido Camero he released an album in 2000 entitled The Conga Kings. That year he appeared in the documentary Calle 54. In 2001, Patato was inducted into the International Latin Music Hall of Fame.

=== Death ===
A lifetime smoker, Patato had emphysema and died of respiratory failure in Cleveland, Ohio on December 4, 2007.

== Style and craft ==
For over 60 years Carlos "Patato" Valdés demonstrated how a musician could combine technical skill with superb showmanship. His conga playing demonstrated the fusion of melody and rhythm. It also reflected his keen understanding of rhythm as a biological constant that is rooted, quite literally, in the human heartbeat. During his performances, Patato even mastered the art of playing his congas while dancing on top of them, to the delight of the audience.

Valdés dazzled audiences well into his seventies with his rumba moves. He is also the man who gave Brigitte Bardot a mambo lesson in the film And God Created Woman. Valdés also expressed his understanding of melody through bass and tres.

Together with Armando Peraza, Valdés would sometimes play a multi-conga and drum setup dubbed the "bongófono" at the Zombie Club in Havana. During the late 1940s, he helped develop the first tunable congas, as earlier models were tuned by the unwieldy method of heating them with a sterno can. His interest in design, as well as his friendship with LP Founder Martin Cohen, led to the development of the LP Patato Model Congas, one of the top-selling conga drums of all time.

== Personal life ==
Valdés was the father of Carlos Hernández, better known as Chick Hernández, a sports anchor/reporter for WUSA9/CBS Sports. .

== Discography ==
=== As leader ===
- 1967: Patato & Totico (Verve) (also reissued as Nuestro barrio) - with Eugenio "Totico" Arango
- 1976: Authority (Latin Percussion Ventures)
- 1976: Ready for Freddy (Latin Percussion Ventures)
- 1980: Batá y rumba (Latin Percussion Ventures)
- 1993: Masterpiece (Messidor)
- 1995: Ritmo y candela (Tonga) - with Changuito and Orestes Vilató
- 1996: Ritmo y candela II (Round World)
- 1997: Único y diferente (Connector Music)
- 2000: The Conga Kings (Chesky) - with Giovanni Hidalgo and Cándido Camero
- 2001: Jazz descargas (Chesky) - with Giovanni Hidalgo and Cándido Camero
- 2004: El hombre (Mambo Maniacs)
- 2006: Live at the Canal Room (USA Records)

=== As sideman ===
With Art Blakey

- Orgy in Rhythm (Blue Note, 1957)

With Willie Bobo

- Uno Dos Tres 1•2•3 (Verve, 1966)

With Alberto Beltrán & Conjunto Casino

- El negrito del batey (Panart, 1955)

With Cachao

- Descarga '77 (Salsoul, 1977)
- Dos (Salsoul, 1977)

With Rafael Cortijo

- Patato y Cortijo – Guaguancó (Teca, c. 1970)

With Antonio "Chocolate" Díaz Mena

- Eso es Latin Jazz ...Man! (Audio Fidelity, 1963)

With Dizzy Gillespie

- The Ebullient Mr. Gillespie (Verve, 1959)
- Have Trumpet, Will Excite! (Verve, 1959)
- Portrait of Jenny (Perception, 1970)

With Benny Golson

- Remembering Clifford (Milestone, 1998)

With Johnny Griffin & Matthew Gee

- Soul Groove (Atlantic, 1963)

With Quincy Jones

- Quincy Plays for Pussycats (Mercury, 1959-65 [1965])

With the Latin Percussion Jazz Ensemble

- Just Like Magic (Latin Percussion Ventures, 1979)
- Live at Montreux (Latin Percussion Ventures, 1980)

With Johnny Lytle

- Swingin' at the Gate (Pacific Jazz, 1967)

With Machito

- Kenya (Roulette, 1958)

With Herbie Mann

- Flautista! (Verve, 1959)
- Herbie Mann's African Suite (United Artists, 1959)
- Right Now (Atlantic, 1962)
- Brazil, Bossa Nova & Blues (UA Jazz, 1962)
- Herbie Mann Live at Newport (Atlantic, 1963)
- My Kinda Groove (Atlantic, 1965)
- Herbie Mann Plays The Roar of the Greasepaint – The Smell of the Crowd (Atlantic, 1965)
- Monday Night at the Village Gate (Atlantic, 1965 [1966])
- Latin Mann (Columbia, 1965)
- Standing Ovation at Newport (Atlantic, 1965)
- Today! (Atlantic, 1966)
- Our Mann Flute (Atlantic, 1966)
- New Mann at Newport (Atlantic, 1967)
- Impressions of the Middle East (Atlantic, 1967)
- A Mann & A Woman (Atlantic, 1966) with Tamiko Jones
- The Beat Goes On (Atlantic, 1967)
- The Herbie Mann String Album (Atlantic, 1967)
- Mississippi Gambler (Atlantic, 1972)
- First Light (Atlantic, 1974)
- Reggae II (Atlantic, 1973 [1976])

With Johnny Pacheco

- His Flute and Latin Jam (Fania, 1965)

With Charlie Palmieri and His Charanga "La Duboney"

- Pachanga at the Caravana Club (Alegre, 1961)

With Duke Pearson

- The Phantom (Blue Note, 1969)

With Dave Pike

- Manhattan Latin (Decca, 1964)

With Tito Puente

- Puente in Percussion (Tico, 1956)
- Top Percussion (RCA Victor, 1958)
- Tambó (RCA Victor, 1960)

With Kenny Dorham

- Afro-Cuban (Blue Note, 1955)

With Don Ellis

- Shock Treatment (Columbia, 1968)

With Stan Free

- Piano a la Percussion (Old Town, 1961)

With Mike Longo

- Matrix (Mainstream, 1972)
- Funkia (Groove Merchant, 1974)

With Johnny Richards

- The Rites of Diablo (Roulette, 1958)

With Al Jazzbo Collins

- Presents Swinging At The Opera (Everest, 1960)

With Grant Green

- The Latin Bit (Blue Note, 1963)

With Charlie Rouse

- Bossa Nova Bacchanal (Blue Note, 1963)

With Max Roach

- Percussion Bitter Sweet (Impulse!, 1961)

With Jorge Dalto

- Rendez-Vous (Eastworld, 1983)
- Urban Oasis (Concord Jazz Picante, 1985)

With Orchestre Keur Samba

- Une soirée a Keur Samba (BAM, 1961)

With Elvin Jones

- Mr. Jones (Blue Note, 1973)

With Ben Tucker

- Baby, You Should Know It (Ava, 1963)

With José Mangual, Sr.

- Buyú (Turnstyle, 1977)
- Authority (LP Records, 1977)

With Alfredo Rodríguez

- Alfredo Rodríguez (Espérance, 1983)

With Onelio Scull

- Santería cubana (Santero)
- Fiesta santera (Santero, 1983)

With Sonny Stitt

- Stitt Goes Latin (Roost, 1963)

With Art Taylor

- A.T.'s Delight (Blue Note, 1961)

With Cal Tjader

- Soul Burst (Verve, 1966)

With Bebo Valdés

- Bebo Rides Again (Messidor, 1995)
- El arte del sabor (Blue Note, 2001)

=== Compilations ===
- The Legend of Cuban Percussion (Six Degrees, 2000)

==== Contributing artist ====
- Afro-Cuba: The Jazz Roots of Cuban Rhythm (Nascente, 1995)
- Nu Yorica 2! (Soul Jazz, 1997)
- The Rough Guide to Salsa (World Music Network, 1997)
- Diggin' the Crates for Afro-Cuban Funk (Empire Musicwerks, 2001)
