= At the Village Gate =

At the Village Gate could refer to several albums recorded at The Village Gate nightclub in New York City, including:

- Herbie Mann at the Village Gate, 1961
- Larry Coryell at the Village Gate, 1971
- Milt Jackson Quintet Live at the Village Gate, 1963
- Nina at the Village Gate by Nina Simone, 1962

See also:

- Byrd at the Gate by Charlie Byrd, 1963
- Herbie Mann Returns to the Village Gate, 1961
- Havin' a Ball at the Village Gate by Lambert, Hendricks & Bavan, 1963
- Swingin' at the Gate by Johnny Lytle, 1967
- Toshiko at Top of the Gate by Toshiko Akiyoshi, 1963
