= The Family of Mann =

Studio album by Herbie Mann
- Released: 1961
- Recorded: April 24–26, 1961; NYC
- Genre: Jazz
- Label: Atlantic; SD 1371
- Producer: Nesuhi Ertegun

Herbie Mann chronology
| The Common Ground (1960) | The Family of Mann (1961) | Herbie Mann at the Village Gate (1961) |

The Family of Mann (subtitled The Music of Herbie Mann) is an album by American jazz flautist Herbie Mann recorded in 1961 for the Atlantic label.

== Reception ==
Professional ratings
Review scores
| Source | Rating |
|---|---|
| Allmusic | 3/5 stars |

Allmusic awarded the album 3 stars stating "Herbie Mann's second in a long string of albums for Atlantic resulted in some slightly commercial but mostly enjoyable music".

== Track listing ==
All compositions by Herbie Mann except as indicated

1. "Why Don't You Do Right?" (Joe McCoy) - 2:29
2. "Guinean" - 4:55
3. "The Puppet" - 4:30
4. "Shein vi di Levone" (Joseph Rumshinsky) - 7:01
5. "Moanin'" (Bobby Timmons) - 6:46
6. "This Little Girl of Mine" (Ray Charles) - 2:27
7. "The Song of Delilah" (Victor Young, Jay Livingston, Ray Evans) - 6:10
8. "Au Privave" (Charlie Parker) - 6:33

== Personnel ==
- Herbie Mann - flute, arranger
- Knobby Totah - bass
- Rudy Collins - drums
- Ray Mantilla, Ray Barretto - percussion
- Dave Pike - vibraphone (tracks 2–5, 7 & 8)
- Leo Ball, Johnny Bello, Jerome Kail, Ziggy Schatz - trumpet (tracks 3 & 5)
- Jose Andreu, Daniel Gonzales, Joe Silva - violin (tracks 1 & 6)
- Charlie Palmieri - piano (tracks 1 & 6)
- Juan Garcia - bass (tracks 1 & 6)
- Willie Rodriguez - percussion (tracks 1 & 6)
