= Herbie Mann Plays The Roar of the Greasepaint – The Smell of the Crowd =

Studio album by Herbie Mann
- Released: 1965
- Recorded: March 3–5, 1965; New York City
- Genre: Jazz
- Length: 28:47
- Label: Atlantic; SD 1437
- Producer: Nesuhi Ertegun

Herbie Mann chronology
My Kinda Groove (1965)	Herbie Mann Plays The Roar of the Greasepaint – The Smell of the Crowd (1965)	Monday Night at the Village Gate (1965)

Herbie Mann Plays The Roar of the Greasepaint – The Smell of the Crowd is an album by American jazz flautist Herbie Mann featuring tunes from the Broadway musical by Leslie Bricusse and Anthony Newley, The Roar of the Greasepaint – The Smell of the Crowd, recorded for the Atlantic label and released in 1965. Chick Corea is on piano on four of the pieces of that album.

== Reception ==
Professional ratings
Review scores
Source	Rating
AllMusic	3/5 stars
Record Mirror	4/5 stars

AllMusic awarded the album 3 stars calling it "One of Mann's less significant projects of the '60s".

== Track listing ==
All compositions by Leslie Bricusse and Anthony Newley

1. "The Joker" - 2:39
2. "Feeling Good" - 3:30
3. "Where Would You Be Without Me?" - 2:26
4. "It Isn't Enough" - 2:26
5. "Look at That Face" - 2:25
6. "This Dream" - 2:01
7. "Who Can I Turn To (When Nobody Needs Me)" - 2:17
8. "The Beautiful Land" - 2:12
9. "My First Love Song" - 4:18
10. "Sweet Beginning" - 2:00
11. "A Wonderful Day Like Today" - 2:30
- Recorded in New York City on March 3 (tracks 1, 2, 5 & 7), March 4 (tracks 3, 6, 8 & 10) and March 5 (tracks 4, 9 & 11), 1965

== Personnel ==
- Herbie Mann - flute
- John Hitchcock, Mark Weinstein - trombone
- Dave Pike - vibraphone
- Chick Corea (tracks 1, 2, 5 & 7), Roger Kellaway (tracks 3, 4, 6 & 8–11) - piano
- Gene Bertoncini (tracks 3, 4, 6 & 8–11), Mundell Lowe (tracks 1, 2, 5 & 7), Turk Van Lake (tracks 4, 9 & 11) - guitar
- Earl May - bass
- Bruno Carr - drums
- Carlos "Patato" Valdes - congas
- Unidentified string section arranged and conducted by Ray Ellis (tracks 1, 2, 5 & 7)
