= Rudy Collins =

American jazz drummer

James Moody, Kenny Baron, Dizzy Gillespie, Rudy Collins, and Chris White in 1965

Rudy Collins (July 24, 1934 – August 15, 1988) was an American jazz drummer born in New York City.

Collins played trombone in high school and started on drums at that time as well. He studied with Sam Ulano during 1953–1957 and began gigging in New York City, playing with Hot Lips Page, Cootie Williams, Eddie Bonnemere, Dizzy Gillespie, Johnny Smith, Carmen McRae, Cab Calloway, and Roy Eldridge. He played with J.J. Johnson and Kai Winding at the Newport Jazz Festival.

Later in the 1950s Collins became increasingly interested in the nascent free jazz scene, in addition to playing with more traditional ensembles. He worked with Herbie Mann from 1959 and later with Cecil Taylor, Quincy Jones, Dave Pike, and Lalo Schifrin.

His last recordings were in 1981.

== Discography ==
With Ahmed Abdul-Malik

- Sounds of Africa (New Jazz, 1962)

With Gene Ammons

- Night Lights (Prestige, 1970 [1985])

With Ray Bryant

- The Ray Bryant Touch (Cadet, 1967)

With Billy Butler

- This Is Billy Butler! (Prestige, 1968)

With Dizzy Gillespie

- The New Continent (Limelight, 1962)
- New Wave (Phillips, 1963)
- Dizzy Gillespie and the Double Six of Paris (Phillips, 1963)
- Something Old, Something New (Phillips, 1964)
- Jambo Caribe (Limelight, 1964)
- I/We Had a Ball (Limelight, 1965) - 1 track
- Paris Jazz Concert Olympia Nov 24th 1965 (Laserlight (2002)

With J. J. Johnson and Kai Winding

- Dave Brubeck and Jay & Kai at Newport (Columbia, 1956)

With Junior Mance

- Live at the Top (Atlantic, 1968)

With Herbie Mann

- Flute, Brass, Vibes and Percussion (Verve, 1959)
- The Common Ground (Atlantic, 1960)
- The Family of Mann (Atlantic, 1961)
- Herbie Mann at the Village Gate (Atlantic, 1961)
- Herbie Mann Returns to the Village Gate (Atlantic, 1961 [1963])
- Our Mann Flute (Atlantic, 1966)

With James Moody

- Comin' On Strong (Argo, 1963)

With the Jimmy Owens-Kenny Barron Quintet

- You Had Better Listen (Atlantic, 1967)

With Dave Pike

- Bossa Nova Carnival (New Jazz, 1962)

With Lalo Schifrin

- Lalo = Brilliance (Roulette, 1962)
- Bossa Nova: New Brazilian Jazz (Audio Fidelity, 1962)
- Piano, Strings and Bossa Nova (MGM, 1962)

With Randy Weston

- Tanjah (Polydor, 1973)

With Leo Wright

- Suddenly the Blues (Atlantic, 1962)

With Quincy Jones

- Big Band Bossa Nova (Mercury, 1962)

== General references ==
- Rudy Collins at Allmusic
