= Latin Fever =

Studio album by Herbie Mann
- Released: 1964
- Recorded: October 15–17 & 19, 1962, October 8, 1963, and January 29, 1964; Rio de Janeiro, Brazil and New York City
- Genre: Latin Jazz, Bossa Nova
- Length: 33:39
- Label: Atlantic; SD 1422
- Producer: Nesuhi Ertegun

Herbie Mann chronology
Herbie Mann Live at Newport (1963)	Latin Fever (1964)	My Kinda Groove (1965)

Latin Fever is an album by American jazz flautist Herbie Mann recorded for the Atlantic label and released in 1964. The album features tracks from the 1962 sessions that produced Do the Bossa Nova with Herbie Mann with more recent recordings.

== Reception ==
Professional ratings
Review scores
Source	Rating
AllMusic	3/5 stars

AllMusic awarded the album 3 stars.

== Track listing ==
1. "Harlem Nocturne" (Earle Hagen, Dick Rogers) – 2:15
2. "Fever" (Eddie Cooley, John Davenport) – 1:52
3. "Not Now – Later On" (Garry Sherman, Norman Meade) – 1:51
4. "The Golden Striker" (John Lewis) – 2:14
5. "How Insensitive" (Antônio Carlos Jobim) – 3:04
6. "You Came a Long Way from St. Louis" (John Benson Brooks, Bob Russell) – 2:28
7. "Batida Differente" (Maurício Einhorn, Durval Lelys) – 5:12
8. "Nana" (Baden Powell) – 3:59
9. "Groovy Samba" (Sérgio Mendes) – 5:06
10. "Influenza de Jazz" (Carlos Lyra) – 5:38
- Recorded in Rio de Janeiro, Brazil on October 15, 1962 (track 8), October 16, 1962 (tracks 7 & 10), October 17, 1962 (track 5) & October 19, 1962 (track 9) and in New York City on October 8, 1963 (tracks 1–3 & 6) and January 29, 1964 (track 4)

== Personnel ==
- Herbie Mann – flute
- Durval Ferreira (tracks 7 & 10), Baden Powell (track 8), Bill Suyker (tracks 1–3 & 6) – guitar
- Clark Terry (tracks 1–3 & 6), Pedro Paulo (tracks 7 & 10), Ernie Royal (tracks 1–3 & 6) – trumpet
- Paulo Moura – alto saxophone (tracks 7 & 10)
- Antônio Carlos Jobim – piano, vocals, arranger (tracks 5 & 9)
- Sérgio Mendes – piano (tracks 7 & 10)
- Paul Griffin – piano, organ (tracks 1–3 & 6)
- Gabriel (track 8), Otavio Bailly Jr. (tracks 7 & 10) – bass
- Juquinha (track 8), Dom Um Romão (tracks 7 & 10), Bobby Thomas (tracks 1–3 & 6) – drums
- George Devens – vibraphone, percussion (tracks 1–3 & 6)
- Other unidentified musicians
