= Almost Everything =

Studio album by Don Friedman
- Released: 1995
- Recorded: April 1995
- Studios: SteepleChase Digital Studio, Copenhagen, Denmark
- Genre: Jazz
- Length: 64:24
- Labels: SteepleChase; SCCD 31368
- Producer: Nils Winther

Don Friedman chronology
Don Friedman at Maybeck (1994)	Almost Everything (1995)	The Days of Wine and Roses (1996)

Almost Everything is an album by American jazz pianist Don Friedman recorded in Denmark in 1995 and released on the Danish SteepleChase label.

== Critical reception ==
Professional ratings
Review scores
Source	Rating
AllMusic	4/5 stars
The Penguin Guide to Jazz Recordings	3.5/4 stars

Ken Dryden, writing for AllMusic, described the album as "one of his finest studio sessions... Highly recommended" and stated "Don Friedman may be one of the best-kept secrets in jazz, in spite of a lengthy career and numerous recordings as a leader".

== Track listing ==
All compositions by Don Friedman, except where indicated.

1. "On Green Dolphin Street" (Bronisław Kaper) – 6:28
2. "Flamands" – 6:38
3. "Waltz for Marilyn" – 11:03
4. "Before the Rain" – 5:38
5. "Emily" (Johnny Mandel) – 6:58
6. "Twigs and Branches" (Matt Wilson) – 5:39
7. "El Niño" (Ron McClure) – 8:13
8. "Darn That Dream" (Jimmy Van Heusen) – 8:24
9. "Almost Everything" – 6:55

== Personnel ==
- Don Friedman – piano
- Ron McClure – bass
- Matt Wilson – drums
