= Flute, Brass, Vibes and Percussion =

Studio album by The Herbie Mann Nonet
- Released: 1961
- Recorded: May 5 and July 26, 1960; NYC
- Genre: Jazz
- Label: Verve; MGV 8392

Herbie Mann chronology
Herbie Mann's African Suite (1959)	Flute, Brass, Vibes and Percussion (1961)	The Common Ground (1960)

Flute, Brass, Vibes and Percussion is an album by American jazz flautist Herbie Mann recorded in 1960 for the Verve label.

== Reception ==
Professional ratings
Review scores
Source	Rating
Allmusic	4.5/5 stars

Allmusic awarded the album 4½ stars stating "In 1960, flutist Herbie Mann put together a very interesting band that was in its brief existence (before Mann's interests shifted elsewhere) one of the top in Afro-Cuban jazz" and called the album "quite underrated and is one of the finest of Mann's long career".

== Track listing ==
All compositions by Herbie Mann except as indicated

1. "Dearly Beloved" (Jerome Kern, Johnny Mercer) - 4:39
2. "You Stepped Out of a Dream" (Nacio Herb Brown, Gus Kahn) - 6:36
3. "I'll Remember April" (Gene de Paul, Patricia Johnston, Don Raye) - 8:32
4. "A Ritual" - 7:30
5. "Fife 'n Tambourine Corps" - 2:02
6. "Autumn Leaves" (Joseph Kosma, Jacques Prévert, Johnny Mercer) - 9:51

== Personnel ==
- Herbie Mann - flute
- Doc Cheatham, Leo Ball, Jerome Kail, Ziggy Schatz - trumpet
- Johnny Rae - vibraphone
- Knobby Totah - bass
- Rudy Collins - drums
- Ray Barretto - congas
- Ray Mantilla - bongos
