= Take Love Easy (song) =

Single by Lena Horne
- B-side: "I Feel So Smoochie"
- Released: 1948
- Label: MGM
- Songwriters: Duke Ellington; John Latouche

Audio
- "Take Love Easy" on YouTube

"Take Love Easy" is a song written by Duke Ellington and John Latouche for their 1946 musical Beggar's Holiday.

It has become a jazz standard, notably recorded by Lena Horne (MGM 10108, 1948), by Duke Ellington himself with his orchestra (Columbia 38519, 1949; vocals by Dolores Parker), by Ella Fitzgerald (Take Love Easy, 1974), Shirley Horn (May the Music Never End, 2003), Bobby Short, Nancy Wilson, Sophie Milman (Take Love Easy, 2009).

== Critical reception ==
=== Beggar's Holiday ===
Reviewing the 1946 Broadway production of the musical, New York Theatre Critics' Reviews noted this song, calling it an "insinuating item", "which, if one is not entirely mistaken, weaves a sinuous course of sous-entendre" and commented Bernice Parks (who played "Jenny the voluptuous Madame") for "[doing] quite well with [it]".

=== Lena Horne version ===
Lena Horne version
Review scores
Source	Rating
Metronome	B

Lena Horne's recording (MGM 10108,c/w "I Feel So Smoochie") was reviewed in 1948 in Metronome, that commended her for handling the "superb tune" in "sexy good taste".

=== Duke Ellington and his orchestra version ===
Duke Ellington and his orchestra version
Review scores
Source	Rating
Billboard	73/100
The New Yorker	favorable

Billboard reviewed Duke Ellington's recording (Columbia 38519, coupled with "I Could Get a Man") in its issue from 9 July 1949, writing: "It's a fine song and is handed excellent treatment by the band, Johnny Hodges' alto and Dolores Parker's vocal." The New Yorker published a favorable review of that single as well, noting: "Miss Parker sings [both songs] engagingly."
