= Limbo Carnival =

Studio album by Dave Pike
- Released: February 1963
- Recorded: December 12, 1962
- Studio: Van Gelder Studio, Englewood Cliffs, NJ
- Genre: Jazz
- Length: 38:14
- Label: New Jazz; NJ 8284
- Producer: Elliot Mazer

Dave Pike chronology
Bossa Nova Carnival (1962)	Limbo Carnival (1963)	Dave Pike Plays the Jazz Version of Oliver! (1962)

Limbo Carnival is an album by American jazz vibraphonist Dave Pike which was recorded in 1962 for the New Jazz label.

== Reception ==
Professional ratings
Review scores
Source	Rating
AllMusic	4/5 stars

AllMusic awarded the album 4 stars stating "Three months after recording the excellent Bossa Nova Carnival, Dave Pike returned to the studio in December 1962 and recorded another fine LP that underscored his interest in world music. But instead of providing another Brazilian-oriented album, the vibist/marimba player opted to explore Caribbean rhythms and melodies".

== Track listing ==
1. "La Bamba" (Ritchie Valens) - 7:36
2. "My Little Suede Shoes" (Charlie Parker) - 3:55
3. "Matilda" (Norman Span) - 3:50
4. "Mambo Bounce" (Sonny Rollins) - 3:10
5. "Limbo Rock" (Jon Sheldon, Billy Strange) - 2:28
6. "Calypso Blues" (Nat King Cole, Don George) - 3:45
7. "Catin' Latin'" (Pony Poindexter) - 4:45
8. "St. Thomas" (Rollins) - 3:45
9. "Jamaica Farewell" (Lord Burgess) - 5:00

== Personnel ==
- Dave Pike - vibraphone, marimba
- Leo Wright - alto saxophone, flute (tracks 1, 3, 5 & 9)
- Jimmy Raney - guitar (tracks 1, 3, 5 & 9)
- Tommy Flanagan - piano (tracks 2, 4 & 6–8)
- Ahmed Abdul-Malik (tracks 2, 4 & 6–8), George Duvivier (tracks 1, 3, 5 & 9) - bass
- Willie Bobo - drums
- Ray Barretto - congas
