= The Doors of Perception (album) =

Live album by Dave Pike
- Released: 1970
- Recorded: September 28, 1966
- Venue: The Village Gate, New York City
- Genre: Jazz
- Length: 27:11
- Label: Vortex; 2007
- Producer: Herbie Mann

Dave Pike chronology
Jazz for the Jet Set (1965)	The Doors of Perception (1970)	Got the Feelin' (1969)

The Doors of Perception is a live album by American jazz vibraphonist Dave Pike which was recorded in 1966 and released on the Vortex label in 1970.

== Critical reception ==
Professional ratings
Review scores
Source	Rating
Allmusic	3.5/5 stars

The Allmusic site awarded the album 3½ stars stating "this is the Pike version of an acid experiment....Though only 27 minutes long, the impression of this disc will stay with listeners long after the record ends. ...While The Doors of Perception may not be every Pike fan's cup of what have you, it will certainly appeal to those who dug his sides for the German MPS label in the early '70s".

== Track listing ==
All compositions by Dave Pike

1. "Free Improvisation" – 3:06
2. "The Drifter" – 7:09
3. "The Doors of Perception" – 3:29
4. "Ballad" – 5:30
5. "Anticipation" – 8:05

== Personnel ==
- Dave Pike – vibraphone, marimba
- Lee Konitz – alto saxophone
- Eddie Daniels – tenor saxophone, clarinet
- Don Friedman – piano
- Chuck Israels – bass, electric bass
- Arnie Wise – drums
