= Jazz for the Jet Set =

Album by Dave Pike

Studio album by Dave Pike
- Released: 1966
- Recorded: October 26 and November 2, 1965; New York City
- Genre: Jazz
- Length: 38:02
- Label: Atlantic; SD 1457
- Producer: Herbie Mann

Dave Pike chronology
Manhattan Latin (1964)	Jazz for the Jet Set (1966)	The Doors of Perception (1966)

Jazz for the Jet Set is an album by American jazz vibraphonist Dave Pike which was recorded in 1965 for the Atlantic label.

== Reception ==
Professional ratings
Review scores
Source	Rating
Allmusic	3/5 stars
The Penguin Guide to Jazz Recordings	3/4 stars

The Allmusic site awarded the album 3 stars stating "This disc is a bit unusual in a few ways. Vibraphonist Dave Pike sticks here exclusively to the marimba, while pianist Herbie Hancock is heard throughout on organ, an instrument he rarely played again... Most of the music consists of obscurities and is open to the influences of the boogaloo and pop rhythms of the era... An interesting effort".

== Track listing ==
All compositions by Dave Pike except as indicated

1. "Blind Man, Blind Man" (Herbie Hancock) - 6:52
2. "Jet Set" - 5:49
3. "Sunny" (Bobby Hebb) - 3:20
4. "When I'm Gone" - 2:59
5. "You've Got Your Troubles" (Roger Cook, Roger Greenaway) - 4:09
6. "Sweet 'Tater Pie" (Rodgers Grant) - 3:50
7. "Just Say Goodbye" (Rodgers Grant, Ruth Grant) - 4:36
8. "Devilette" (Hettye Taylor, Ben Tucker) - 6:04
- Recorded in New York City on October 26 (tracks 1, 5, 7 & 8) and November 2 (tracks 2–4 & 6), 1965

== Personnel ==
- Dave Pike - marimba
- Melvin Lastie (tracks 2–4 & 6), Marty Sheller (tracks 1, 5, 7 & 8), Clark Terry - trumpet
- Herbie Hancock - organ
- Billy Butler - guitar
- Bob Cranshaw - bass (tracks 1, 5, 7 & 8)
- Jimmy Lewis - electric bass (tracks 2–4 & 6)
- Bruno Carr (tracks 1, 5, 7 & 8), Grady Tate (tracks 2–4 & 6) - drums
