= The Homecoming (album) =

Studio album by Hagood Hardy
- Released: 1975
- Genre: Jazz
- Length: 38:25
- Label: Duke Street Records

The Homecoming is a 1975 album by Canadian composer, pianist, and vibraphonist Hagood Hardy. Six of the tracks were composed by Hardy. The album also contained fellow Canadian musician Gordon Lightfoot's song "Cold on the Shoulder" and five songs by other songwriters. It reached #21 on the RPM Magazine Top Albums chart in October, 1975.

In 1976, based on the music in this collection, Hardy was named Composer of the Year at the annual Juno Awards.

== Title track ==
The title track, "The Homecoming", started out as music to a 1972 TV commercial for Salada tea. After being included in this album, it was released as a single in 1975 on the Isis label through the Toronto company, Hagood Hardy Productions. It rose to #14 on the Canadian charts, and to #41 on the pop and #6 on the easy listening US charts. It was certified Gold in Canada.

== Track listing ==
All tracks are written by Hagood Hardy, except where noted.

No.	Title	Writer(s)	Length
1.	"The Homecoming"		2:29
2.	"I Won't Last a Day Without You"	Roger Nichols / Paul Williams	3:52
3.	"My Elusive Dreams"	Curly Putman / Billy Sherrill	2:43
4.	"Jennifer's Song"		2:43
5.	"You and Me Against the World"	Kenny Ascher / Paul Williams	3:27
6.	"Travellin' On"		2:59
7.	"Balloons"		2:53
8.	"Clouds"	David Gates	3:35
9.	"Cold on the Shoulder"	Gordon Lightfoot	3:29
10.	"Wintertime"		2:15
11.	"Quorum"		4:12
12.	"The Trouble With Hello is Goodbye"	Dave Grusin / Alan and Marilyn Bergman	3:48
Total length:			38:25

== Charts ==
Chart (1976)	Peak position
Australian (Kent Music Report)	57
