= A New Dimension =

Studio album by Willie Bobo
- Released: 1969
- Recorded: December 23, 1968; New York City
- Genre: Jazz
- Length: 38:44
- Label: Verve; V6 8772
- Producer: Esmond Edwards

Willie Bobo chronology
Spanish Blues Band (1968)	A New Dimension (1969)	Do What You Want to Do (1971)

A New Dimension is an album by jazz percussionist Willie Bobo recorded in 1968 and released on the Verve label.

== Reception ==
Professional ratings
Review scores
Source	Rating
AllMusic	4.5/5 stars

AllMusic awarded the album 4½ stars.

== Track listing ==
1. "Psychedelic Blues" (Clarence "Sonny" Henry) - 6:15
2. "The Look of Love" (Burt Bacharach, Hal David) - 4:18
3. "Grazing in the Grass" (Philemon Hou) - 5:27
4. "Quieres Volver" (José Feliciano, Nick Jiménez) - 3:54
5. "Yellow Days" (Alan Bernstein, Álvaro Carrillo) - 3:50
6. "Lisa" (Henry) - 6:14
7. "This Guy's in Love with You" (Bacharach, David) - 2:58
8. "Sham Time" (Eddie Harris) - 5:48

== Personnel ==
- Willie Bobo - timbales
- Jimmy Owens - trumpet
- Felix Wilkins, Stan Webb - flute
- Phil Bodner - flute, alto saxophone
- Kenny Rogers - alto saxophone, tenor saxophone
- Clarence "Sonny" Henry - guitar, arranger
- Chuck Rainey - electric bass
- Freddie Waits - drums
- Jack Jennings, Osvaldo Martinez, Victor Pantoja, John Rodriguez - percussion
- Unidentified string section arranged and conducted by Don Sebesky (tracks 2, 4, 5 & 7)
