= Ray Mantilla =

American jazz drummer (1934–2020)

- Born: June 22, 1934; South Bronx, New York City, U.S.
- Died: March 21, 2020 (aged 85) Manhattan, New York City, U.S.
- Genres: Jazz, Latin jazz
- Occupation: Musician
- Instrument: Drums
- Years active: 1950s–2020
- Labels: Inner City, Red, Savant
- Formerly of: M'Boom, Max Roach, Art Blakey, Jazz Tribe

Raymond Mantilla (June 22, 1934 – March 21, 2020) was an American percussionist.

== Discography ==
=== As leader ===
- Mantilla (Inner City, 1978)
- Hands of Fire (Red, 1984)
- Synergy (Red, 1986)
- Dark Powers (Red, 1988)
- The Jazz Tribe (Red, 1992)
- The Next Step (Red, 1999)
- Man-Ti-Ya (Savant, 2004)
- Good Vibrations (Savant, 2006)
- Everlasting (Red, 2009)
- The Connection (Savant, 2013)
- High Voltage (Savant, 2017)
- Rebirth (Savant, 2020)

=== As sideman ===
With Mose Allison

- 1994 The Earth Wants You
- 1997 Jazz Profile

With Gato Barbieri

- Chapter Three: Viva Emiliano Zapata (Impulse!, 1974)
- Yesterdays (Flying Dutchman, 1974)

With Ray Barretto

- 1961 Barretto Para Bailar
- 1963 Latino! & Afro-Jaws
- 1973 Carnaval: Latino!/Pachanga with Barretto

With Joe Beck

- Beck & Sanborn (Columbia, 1975)
- Beck (Kudu, 1975)

With Walter Bishop Jr.

- Cubicle (Muse, 1978)

With Art Blakey

- Child's Dance (Prestige, 1972)
- In My Prime Vol. 1 (Timeless, 1977)
- In My Prime Vol. 2 (Timeless, 1977)

With Teresa Brewer

- 1982 Midnight Cafe (A Few More for the Road)
- 1984 Live at Carnegie Hall & Montreaux, Switzerland
- 1983 I Dig Big Band Singers

With Kenny Burrell

- 1991 Sunup to Sundown
- 1998 Kenny Burrell and the Jazz Giants

With Joe Chambers

- The Almoravid (Muse, 1973)
- New World (Finite, 1976)

With Richie Cole

- New York Afternoon (Muse, 1977)
- 1977 Alto Madness
- 1986 Pure Imagination
- 1996 West Side Story
- 1998 Richie & Phil & Richie
- 2006 Rises's Rose Garden

With Larry Coryell

- 1975 Basics (1968–1969)
- 1979 Return
- 2002 Birdfingers

With Joe Farrell

- Canned Funk (CTI, 1975)

With John Hicks

- Sweet Love of Mine (HighNote, 2006)

With Morgana King

- 1998 Looking Through the Eyes of Love
- 2000 Tender Moments

With Herbie Mann

- Flute, Brass, Vibes and Percussion (Verve, 1959)
- The Common Ground (Atlantic, 1961)
- The Family of Mann (Atlantic, 1961)
- Herbie Mann at the Village Gate (Atlantic, 1962)
- Herbie Mann Returns to the Village Gate (Atlantic, 1963)
- Our Mann Flute (Atlantic, 1966)
- Discothèque (Atlantic, 1975)
- Waterbed (Atlantic, 1975)

With M'Boom

- Collage (Soul Note, 1984)
- To the Max! (Enja, 1990–91)
- Live at S.O.B.'s New York (1992)

With Jack McDuff

- Magnetic Feel (Cadet, 1975)

With Jimmy McGriff

- The Groover (JAM, 1982)

With Bob McHugh

- 1994 Manhattan Sunrise
- 2003 Another Sunrise

With Charles Mingus

- 1978 Cumbia & Jazz Fusion
- 1979 Me, Myself an Eye
- 1981 Something Like a Bird

With Diedre Murray and Fred Hopkins

- Stringology (Black Saint, 1994)

With Mark Murphy

- Satisfaction Guaranteed (Muse, 1980)

With James Spaulding

- Gotstabe a Better Way! (Muse, 1988 [1990])

With Jeremy Steig

- Monium (Columbia, 1974)
- Temple of Birth (Columbia, 1975)
- Firefly (CTI, 1977)

With The Players Association

- 1980 We Got the Groove
- 1998 The Players Association/Turn the Music Up!

With Mickey Tucker

- Mister Mysterious (Muse, 1978)

With Cedar Walton

- Mobius (RCA, 1975)
- The Pentagon (East Wind, 1976)
- Soundscapes (Columbia, 1980)
- Roots (1997)
- Latin Tinge (HighNote, 2002)
- The Bouncer (HighNote, 2011)
