= Dave Pike Plays the Jazz Version of Oliver! =

Studio album by Dave Pike
- Released: 1963
- Recorded: December 28, 1962; Van Gelder Studio, Englewood Cliffs, New Jersey
- Genre: Jazz
- Length: 31:41
- Label: Moodsville; MVLP 36
- Producer: Don Schlitten

Dave Pike chronology
Limbo Carnival (1962)	Dave Pike Plays the Jazz Version of Oliver! (1963)	Manhattan Latin (1964)

Dave Pike Plays the Jazz Version of Oliver! is an album by American jazz vibraphonist Dave Pike performing compositions by Lionel Bart from the musical Oliver! which was recorded in 1962 for the Moodsville label.

== Reception ==
Professional ratings
Review scores
Source	Rating
AllMusic	2/5 stars

AllMusic awarded the album 2 stars.

== Track listing ==
All compositions by Lionel Bart

1. "I'd Do Anything" - 4:45
2. "As Long as He Needs Me" - 5:37
3. "Who Will Buy" - 6:09
4. "Food, Glorious Food" - 3:18
5. "Boy for Sale" - 1:18
6. "Where Is Love?" - 5:48
7. "It's a Fine Life" - 4:46

== Personnel ==
- Dave Pike - vibraphone
- Tommy Flanagan - piano
- Jimmy Raney - guitar
- George Tucker - bass
- Walter Perkins - drums
