= Vera Auer =

Austrian jazz musician (1919–1996)

Vera Auer (later Vera Auer-Boucher) (April 20, 1919, Vienna – August 2, 1996, New York City) was an Austrian jazz accordionist and vibraphonist. She was the niece of Leopold Auer.

Auer learned classical piano but turned to jazz after beginning to play with Attila Zoller in the late 1940s. She formed her own band with Zoller which performed regularly on the Austrian radio station Österreichische Radioverkehrs AG in the early 1950s, then moved to Frankfurt in 1954. In Germany she played jazz festivals and accompanied Donald Byrd and Art Taylor. After relocating to the United States in 1960, she worked with Dave Burns, Ted Curson, J. J. Johnson, Cal Massey, Sonny Red, and Zoot Sims in the 1960s. In the 1970s and 1980s she played with Richard Williams, both as a side performer and with her own ensemble.
