= Magnetic Feel =

Studio album by Jack McDuff
- Released: 1975
- Recorded: 1975
- Genre: Jazz
- Label: Cadet; CA 60039
- Producer: Esmond Edwards

Jack McDuff chronology
The Fourth Dimension (1973-74)	Magnetic Feel (1975)	Sophisticated Funk (1976)

Professional ratings
Review scores
Source	Rating
The Rolling Stone Jazz Record Guide	1/5 stars

Magnetic Feel is an album by organist Jack McDuff recorded in 1975 and released on the Cadet label.

== Track listing ==
All compositions by Jack McDuff except as indicated

1. "Blue Monsoon" (Esmond Edwards) - 6:05
2. "Don't Mess With Mr. T" (Marvin Gaye) - 6:30
3. "A Long Goodie" - 5:05
4. "Won't You Try My Love" - 4:36
5. "Black Jack" - 8:20
6. "Magnetic Feel" - 6:29

== Personnel ==
- Jack McDuff - organ, electric piano, synthesizer, piano
- Pee Wee Ellis - alto saxophone, tenor saxophone
- Phil Upchurch - guitar
- George Benson - guitar, drums
- Cornell Dupree - rhythm guitar
- Bob Cranshaw - electric bass
- Grady Tate - drums
- Ray Mantilla - congas, percussion
