= A Day in the City =

Studio album by Don Friedman
- Released: 1961
- Recorded: June 12, 1961; New York City
- Genre: Jazz
- Length: 36:16
- Label: Riverside; RLP 384

Don Friedman chronology
A Day in the City (1961)	Circle Waltz (1962)

A Day in the City (subtitled Six Jazz Variations on a Theme) is the debut album by pianist Don Friedman recorded in 1961 and released on the Riverside label.

== Reception ==
Professional ratings
Review scores
Source	Rating
AllMusic	4.5/5 stars
DownBeat	4/5 stars
The Penguin Guide to Jazz Recordings	3/4 stars

The AllMusic review by Scott Yanow stated: "Friedman's playing (which shows the strong influence of modern classical music, particularly in its chords) rewards repeated listenings".

DownBeat critic Pete Welding had this to say about A Day in the City in his April 26, 1962, review: "Friedman is a pianist of extraordinary ingenuity and originality. Friedman will strike most listeners as a spiritual cohort of Bill Evans, for their approaches are markedly similar."

== Track listing ==
All compositions by Don Friedman

No.	Title	Length
1.	"Dawn"	6:01
2.	"Midday"	5:45
3.	"Rush Hour"	6:41
4.	"Sunset"	5:44
5.	"Early Evening"	4:09
6.	"Night"	7:56

== Personnel ==
- Don Friedman – piano
- Chuck Israels – bass
- Joe Hunt – drums
