= Attila Zoller =

Hungarian jazz guitarist (1927–1998)

- Birth name: Attila Cornelius Zoller
- Born: June 13, 1927; Visegrád, Hungary
- Died: January 25, 1998 (aged 70); Townshend, Vermont, U.S.
- Genres: Jazz, free jazz
- Occupation(s): Musician, inventor, educator
- Instrument: Guitar
- Years active: 1960–1998
- Labels: Enja

Attila Cornelius Zoller (June 13, 1927 – January 25, 1998) was a Hungarian jazz guitarist. After World War II, he escaped the Soviet takeover of Hungary by fleeing through the mountains on foot into Austria. In 1959, he moved to the United States, where he spent the rest of his life as a musician and teacher.

== Music career ==
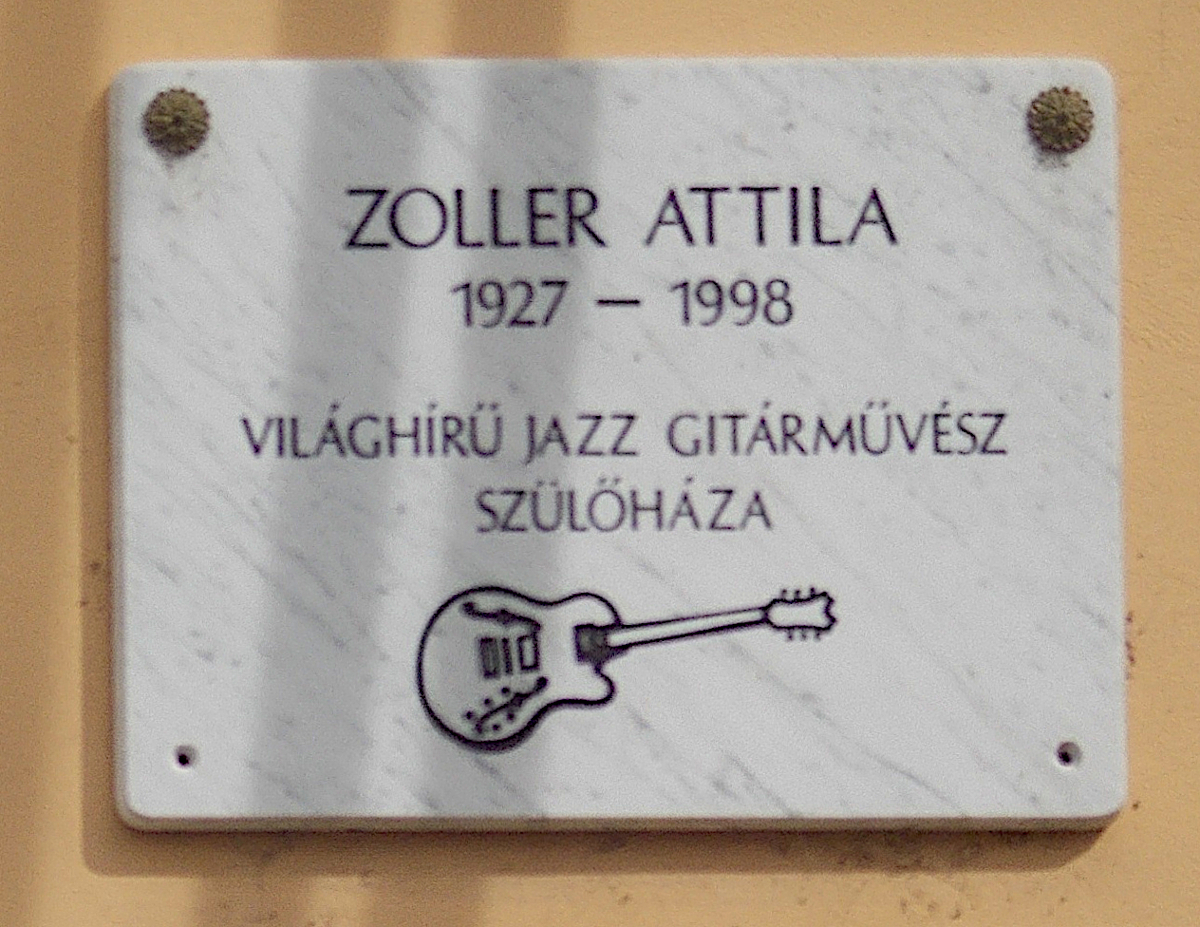
Plaque at Zoller's birthplace in Visegrád, Hungary

Zoller was born in Visegrád, Hungary. As a child, he learned violin from his father, a professional violinist. While in school, he played flugelhorn and bass before choosing guitar. He dropped out of school and played in jazz clubs in Budapest while Russia occupied Hungary. He fled Hungary in 1948 as the Soviet Union was establishing communist military rule. He escaped on foot, carrying his guitar through the mountains into Austria. He settled in Vienna, became an Austrian citizen, and started a jazz group with accordionist Vera Auer.

In the mid-1950s, Zoller moved to Germany and played with German musicians Jutta Hipp and Hans Koller. When American jazz musicians passed through, such as Oscar Pettiford and Lee Konitz, they persuaded him to move to the United States. He moved to the U.S. after receiving a scholarship to the Lenox School of Jazz. One of his teachers was guitarist Jim Hall and his roommate was Ornette Coleman, who got him interested in free jazz.

From 1962 to 1965, Zoller performed in a group with flautist Herbie Mann, then Lee Konitz and Albert Mangelsdorff. Over the years, he played and recorded with Benny Goodman, Stan Getz, Red Norvo, Jimmy Raney, Herbie Hancock, Ron Carter, Shirley Scott, Cal Tjader, Jimi Hendrix, and in New York City jazz clubs in the 1960s with pianist Don Friedman

In 1974, he started the Attila Zoller Jazz Clinics in Vermont, later named the Vermont Jazz Center, where he taught until 1998. He invented a bi-directional pickup, designed strings and a signature guitar series. Between the years 1989 and 1998, he played more and more with the German vibraphonist Wolfgang Lackerschmid. They also did recordings together. He performed with Tommy Flanagan and George Mraz in New York City three weeks before his death in 1998 in Townshend, Vermont.

== Awards and honors ==
- Lifetime Achievement Award, New England Foundation for the Arts
- Message to Attila, tribute album, coordinated and produced by guitarist David Becker, featuring Zoller's compositions performed by guitarists John Abercrombie, Gene Bertoncini, Peter Bernstein, Pat Metheny, and Mike Stern

== Discography ==
=== As leader/co-leader ===
- The Horizon Beyond (Emarcy, 1965)
- Zoller Koller Solal with Hans Koller & Martial Solal (SABA, 1966) – rec. 1965
- Katz & Maus (SABA, 1967) – rec. 1966
- Zo-Ko-Ma with Lee Konitz & Albert Mangelsdorff (MPS, 1968)
- Gypsy Cry (Embryo, 1970)
- Dream Bells (Enja, 1976)
- Common Cause (Enja, 1979)
- Jim & I with Jimmy Raney (L+R, 1980) – rec. 1979
- The K & K 3 in New York with Hans Koller & George Mraz (L+R, 1980) – rec. 1979
- Conjunction (Inner City, 1981) – rec. 1979
- Jim & I Live with Jimmy Raney (L+R, 1981)
- Memories of Pannonia (Enja, 1986)
- Overcome (Enja, 1988) – live rec. 1979 & 1986
- Live Highlights '92 (Bhakti, 1992) – live
- When It's Time (Enja, 1995) – rec. 1994
- Lasting Love (Acoustic Music, 1997)
- The Last Recordings (Enja, 2000) – rec. 1997–1998
- Common Language with Helmut Kagerer (Acoustic Music, 2002) – rec. 1995 and live rec. 1997–1998
- Jazz Soundtracks (Sonorama, 2013) – rec. 1962–1967

=== As sideman ===
With Klaus Doldinger

- Doldinger in Sud Amerika (Philips, 1965)
- Jubilee (Atlantic, 1973)

With Don Friedman

- Dreams and Explorations (Riverside, 1965)
- Metamorphosis (Prestige, 1966)

With Hans Koller

- Exclusiv (SABA, 1963)
- Trinity (L+R, 1979)

With Albert Mangelsdorff

- Albert Mangelsdorff and His Friends (MPS, 1977)
- Mainhattan Modern Lost Jazz Files (Sonorama, 2015)
- The Jazz Sextet (Moosicus, 2017)

With Herbie Mann

- Herbie Mann Live at Newport (Atlantic, 1963)
- My Kinda Groove (Atlantic, 1965)
- Our Mann Flute (Atlantic, 1966)
- Impressions of the Middle East (Atlantic, 1967)
- The Beat Goes On (Atlantic, 1967)

With Oscar Pettiford

- The Oscar Pettiford Quartet (Ex Libris, 1958)
- The Legendary Oscar Pettiford (Black Lion, 1975)

With others

- Gary Crosby, Gary Crosby (World Pacific, 1957)
- Lajos Dudas, Monte Carlo (Rayna, 1981)
- Lee Konitz & Don Friedman & Attila Zoller, Thingin (hat ART, 1996)
- Emil Mangelsdorff, Meditation (L+R, 1994)
- Dave Pike, Manhattan Latin (Decca, 1964)
- Shirley Scott, Roll 'Em: Shirley Scott Plays the Big Bands (Impulse!, 1966)
- Tony Scott, Tony Scott (Verve, 1968)
- Cal Tjader, Soul Burst (Verve, 1966)
- Michal Urbaniak, We'll Remember Komeda (MPS/BASF, 1973)

== Bibliography ==
- Simon Géza Gábor: Mindhalálig gitár - Zoller Attila élete és művészete. Budapest, 2002. ISBN 963-204-716-8
- Simon Géza Gábor: Immens gut, Attila Zoller. Sein Leben und seine Kunst. Budapest, 2003. ISBN 963-206-928-5
- Heinz Protzer: Attila Zoller. Sein Leben, seine Zeit, seine Musik. Erftstadt, 2009. ISBN 978-3-00-026568-6
- Simon Géza Gábor: Guitar Forever - Attila Zoller Discography, Budapest, 2011
