= Circle Waltz =

Studio album by Don Friedman
- Released: 1962
- Recorded: May 14, 1962; Plaza Sound Studios, New York City
- Genre: Jazz
- Length: 36:16
- Label: Riverside; RLP 431
- Producer: Orrin Keepnews

Don Friedman chronology
A Day in the City (1961)	Circle Waltz (1962)	Flashback (1963)

Circle Waltz is the second album by pianist Don Friedman which was recorded in 1962 and released on the Riverside label.

== Reception ==
Professional ratings
Review scores
Source	Rating
DownBeat	4/5 stars
AllMusic	4/5 stars
The Penguin Guide to Jazz Recordings	3.5/4 stars

Jazz writer Leonard Feather's review was published in the Down Beat edition of January 17, 1963. Feather wrote: "Friedman is a rare pianist. He thinks before he plays... the album is in a class with some of the best work of Bill Evans, with whom Friedman can be related in terms of general direction rather than emulation."

The AllMusic review by Scott Yanow stated: "Even ignoring that bassist Chuck Israels is on this set and the similarity of some of the repertoire, it is difficult to overlook the fact that pianist Don Friedman sounds very similar to Bill Evans... Friedman uses chord voicings similar to Evans and engages in the same type of close interplay with his sidemen. However, since the music is of high quality and few other keyboardists sounded like Evans this early, Circle Waltz is worth hearing by post-bop fans."

== Track listing ==
All compositions by Don Friedman, except as indicated

1. "Circle Waltz" – 5:59
2. "Sea's Breeze" – 6:05
3. "I Hear a Rhapsody" (Jack Baker, George Fragos, Dick Gasparre) – 7:32
4. "In Your Own Sweet Way" (Dave Brubeck) – 5:20
5. "Loves Parting" – 5:45
6. "So in Love" (Cole Porter) – 3:25
7. "Modes Pivoting" – 6:44

== Personnel ==
- Don Friedman – piano
- Chuck Israels – bass (tracks 1–5 & 7)
- Pete LaRoca – drums (tracks 1–5 & 7)
