= It's Time for Dave Pike =

Studio album by Dave Pike
- Released: 1961
- Recorded: January 30 and February 9, 1961
- Studio: Plaza Sound Studios, New York City
- Genre: Jazz
- Length: 37:49
- Label: Riverside; RLP 360
- Producer: Orrin Keepnews

Dave Pike chronology
It's Time for Dave Pike (1961)	Pike's Peak (1962)

It's Time for Dave Pike is the debut album led by American jazz vibraphonist Dave Pike which was recorded in 1961 for the Riverside label.

== Reception ==
Professional ratings
Review scores
Source	Rating
AllMusic	3/5 stars
DownBeat	3.5/5 stars
The Penguin Guide to Jazz Recordings	3/4 stars

The contemporaneous DownBeat reviewer praised the spirit of Pike's playing, while identifying reservations: "he doesn't always follow through on ideas, cramming too much into one solo. He has a little trouble bringing his solos to a conclusion". The AllMusic site awarded the album 3 stars stating "By 1961 standards, this album isn't experimental or forward-thinking – certainly not compared to some of the adventurous, challenging sounds that were coming from modal and avant-garde improvisers in the early '60s. But it's easy to enjoy if you appreciate swinging, inspired bop along the lines of Milt Jackson, who is one of Pike's primary influences".

== Track listing ==
All compositions by Dave Pike except as indicated

1. "Cheryl" (Charlie Parker) - 5:02
2. "On Green Dolphin Street" (Bronisław Kaper, Ned Washington) - 5:34
3. "It's Time" - 5:40
4. "Hot House" (Tadd Dameron) - 4:08
5. "Forward" - 5:12
6. "Solar" (Miles Davis) - 3:14
7. "Little Girl Blue" (Lorenz Hart, Richard Rodgers) - 3:55
8. "Tendin' to Business" (Don Cherry) - 5:04

== Personnel ==
- Dave Pike - vibraphone
- Barry Harris - piano (tracks 1–6 & 8)
- Reggie Workman - bass (tracks 1–6 & 8)
- Billy Higgins - drums (tracks 1–6 & 8)
