= Willie Bobo =

American jazz percussionist (1934–1983)

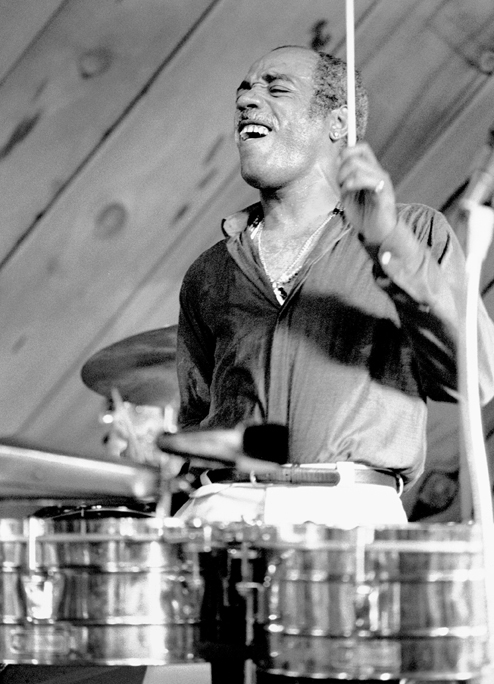
- Bobo at Bach Dancing & Dynamite Society in Half Moon Bay, California in 1979

Background information
- Born: William Correa; February 28, 1934; East Harlem, New York, U.S.
- Died: September 15, 1983 (aged 49)
- Genres: Latin jazz, Afro-Cuban jazz, Boogaloo
- Occupation: Musician
- Instruments: Timbales, Drumset, Congas, various percussion instruments

William Correa (February 28, 1934 – September 15, 1983), better known by his stage name Willie Bobo, was an American Latin jazz percussionist and jazz drummer of Puerto Rican descent. Bobo rejected the stereotypical expectations of Latino music and was noted for his versatility as an authentic Latin percussionist as well as a jazz drummer easily moving stylistically from jazz, Latin, and rhythm and blues music.

== Early life ==
Born William Correa to a Puerto Rican family, Bobo grew up in Spanish Harlem, New York City, United States. His father played the cuatro, a ten stringed guitar-like instrument. As a teenager, Bobo taught himself the bongos and later the congas, timbales, and drums. In 1947, Bobo started working as a band boy for Machito in order to gain entrance to the band's concerts, sometimes filling in on percussion.

At age 12, he began his professional career as a dancer and two years later made his recording debut as a bongo player.

== Career ==
He met Mongo Santamaría shortly after his arrival in New York and studied with him while acting as his translator. In the early 1950s, Bobo recorded with Mary Lou Williams. She is said to have first given the nickname Bobo.

From 1954 until 1957, Bobo played with Tito Puente's band as part of the percussion section alongside Santamaria. Bobo joined George Shearing's band on the album The Shearing Spell.

After leaving Shearing, Cal Tjader asked Bobo and Santamaría to become part of the Cal Tjader Modern Mambo Quintet, who released several albums as the mambo craze reached fever pitch in the late 1950s. Reuniting with his mentor Santamaría in 1960, the pair released the album Sabroso! for the Fantasy label. Bobo later formed his own group, releasing Do That Thing/Guajira with Tico and Bobo's Beat and Let's Go Bobo for Roulette, without achieving huge market penetration.

After the success of Tjader's Soul Sauce, in which he was heavily involved, Bobo formed a new band with the backing of Verve Records, releasing Spanish Grease, the title track being perhaps his most well known tune. Highly successful at this attempt, Bobo released a further six albums with Verve.

In 1969, he moved to Los Angeles. He again met up with his longtime friend Richard Sanchez Sr. and his son Richard Jr. and began recording in the studio. Bobo then worked as a session musician for Carlos Santana among others, as well as being a regular in the band for Bill Cosby's variety show Cos. Santana covered Willie Bobo's Latin song "Evil Ways" (written by Clarence "Sonny" Henry) in 1969 on their debut album. In the late 1970s, Bobo recorded albums for Blue Note and Columbia Records.

== Personal life ==
Bobo's youngest son, Eric Bobo (Eric Correa), is a percussionist with crew Cypress Hill. He also performed on the Beastie Boys' 1994 album Ill Communication. His grandson, William Valen Correa, is co-founder of the music-based non-profit organization HNDP Los Angeles.

== Death ==
After a period of ill health, Bobo died at the age of 49, succumbing to cancer.

== Discography ==
=== As leader ===
- Do That Thing/Guajira (Tico, 1963)
- Bobo's Beat (Roulette, 1964)
- Let's Go Bobo! (Roulette, 1964)
- Spanish Grease (Verve, 1965)
- Uno Dos Tres 1•2•3 (Verve, 1966)
- Feelin' So Good (Verve, 1966)
- Juicy (Verve, 1967)
- Bobo Motion (Verve, 1967)
- Spanish Blues Band (Verve, 1968)
- A New Dimension (Verve, 1968)
- Do What You Want to Do (Sussex, 1971)
- The Drum Session (Philips, 1975) with Louie Bellson, Shelly Manne, Paul Humphrey
- Tomorrow Is Here (Blue Note, 1977)
- Hell of an Act to Follow (Columbia, 1978)
- Bobo (Columbia, 1979)
- Lost & Found (Concord Picante, 2006)
- Dig My Feeling (Nacional Records, 2016)

=== As sideman ===
With Nat Adderley

- Autobiography (Atlantic, 1965)

With Dorothy Ashby

- The Fantastic Jazz Harp of Dorothy Ashby (Atlantic, 1965)

With Bob Brookmeyer

- Trombone Jazz Samba (Verve, 1962)

With Dave Burns

- Warming Up! (Vanguard, 1964)

With Eddie "Lockjaw" Davis

- Goin' to the Meeting (Prestige, 1962)

With Miles Davis

- Quiet Nights (Columbia, 1964)
- Sorcerer (Columbia, 1967)

With Victor Feldman

- Latinsville! (Contemporary, 1960)

With José Feliciano

- Angela (Private Stock, 1976)

With Benny Golson

- Killer Joe (Columbia, 1977)

With Dexter Gordon

- Landslide (Blue Note, 1962 [1980])

With Grant Green

- The Latin Bit (Blue Note, 1962)

With Chico Hamilton

- Chic Chic Chico (Impulse!, 1965)
- El Chico (Impulse!, 1965)
- The Further Adventures of El Chico (Impulse!, 1966)

With Slide Hampton

- Explosion! The Sound of Slide Hampton (Atlantic, 1962)

With Herbie Hancock

- Inventions and Dimensions (Blue Note, 1964)

With Eddie Harris

- Bad Luck Is All I Have (Atlantic, 1975)

With Bobby Hutcherson

- Montara (Blue Note, 1975)

With Herbie Mann

- Right Now (Atlantic, 1962)
- Brazil, Bossa Nova & Blues (United Artists, 1962)
- Herbie Mann Live at Newport (Atlantic, 1963)
- My Kinda Groove (Atlantic, 1965)
- Latin Mann (Columbia, 1965)
- Our Mann Flute (Atlantic, 1966)
- The Beat Goes On (Atlantic, 1967)

With Les McCann

- McCanna (Pacific Jazz, 1964)
- Much Les (Atlantic, 1968)

With Gary McFarland

- Soft Samba (Verve, 1963)

With Buddy Miles

- Chapter VII (Columbia, 1973)

With Wes Montgomery

- Movin' Wes (Verve, 1964)

With Oliver Nelson

- Skull Session (Flying Dutchman, 1975)

With Dave Pike

- Limbo Carnival (New Jazz, 1962)
- Manhattan Latin (Decca, 1964)

With Tito Puente

- Cuban Carnival (RCA Victor, 1956)

With Ike Quebec

- Soul Samba (Blue Note, 1962)

With Terry Reid

- River (Atlantic, 1973)

With Dannie Richmond

- "In" Jazz for the Culture Set (Impulse!, 1965)

With Charlie Rouse

- Bossa Nova Bacchanal (Blue Note, 1963)

With A. K. Salim

- Afro-Soul/Drum Orgy (Prestige, 1965)

With Mongo Santamaria

- Mighty Mongo (Fantasy, 1962)
- Viva Mongo! (Fantasy, 1962)

With Doc Severinsen

- Rhapsody For Now! (RCA, 1973)

With Sonny Stitt

- Stitt Goes Latin (Roost, 1963)

With Gábor Szabó

- Spellbinder (Impulse!, 1966)

With Clark Terry

- Mumbles (Mainstream, 1966)

With Cal Tjader

- Latino (Fantasy, 1958)
- Cal Tjader's Concert by the Sea (Fantasy, 1959)
- Cal Tjader's Latin Concert (Fantasy, 1959)
- West Side Story (Fantasy, 1960)
- Plays Harold Arlen (Fantasy, 1961)
- Live and Direct (Fantasy, 1962)
- Breeze from the East (Verve, 1964)
- Soul Sauce (Verve, 1965)

With Don Wilkerson

- Elder Don (Blue Note, 1962)

== Filmography ==
- 2008 Willie Bobo: King Conga

== Popular culture ==
- Bobo's song Fried Neck Bones and Some Homefries (from the 1966 album Uno Dos Tres 1•2•3) is featured in the 2006 video game Scarface: The World Is Yours.
