= Today! (Herbie Mann album) =

Studio album by Herbie Mann
- Released: 1966
- Recorded: November 18–19, 1965
- Genre: Jazz
- Label: Atlantic
- Producer: Nesuhi Ertegun

Herbie Mann chronology
Standing Ovation at Newport (1965)	Today! (1966)	Our Mann Flute (1966)

Today! is an album by jazz flautist Herbie Mann released on the Atlantic label featuring performances recorded in 1966.

== Reception ==
The Allmusic review by Scott Yanow states "Flutist Herbie Mann has always had wide interests in music. For this...LP he is joined by three brass, vibraphonist Dave Pike, bassist Earl May, drummer Bruno Carr and percussionist Patato Valdes (with arrangements by Oliver Nelson) for a wide-ranging program that includes two Beatles songs, a selection from Burt Bacharach and two ancient pieces by Duke Ellington ("Creole Love Call" and "The Mooche"). In general Mann plays quite well but there is little memorable about this generally commercial effort."

Professional ratings
Review scores
Source	Rating
Allmusic	3/5 stars

== Track listing ==
1. "Today" (Herbie Mann, Oliver Nelson) 3:45
2. "The Creole Love Call" (Duke Ellington) 3:46
3. "Don't Say I Didn't Tell You So" (Burt Bacharach, Hal David) 4:15
4. "Arrastao" (Norman Gimbel, Edu Lobo) 3:52
5. "The Mooch" (Duke Ellington, Irving Mills) 3:40
6. "If You Gotta Make a Fool of Somebody" (Rudy Clark) 4:58
7. "Yesterday" (John Lennon, Paul McCartney) 5:00
8. "The Night Before" (John Lennon, Paul McCartney) 3:48

- Recorded in New York City on December 18, 1965 (tracks 1–4) and December 19, 1965 (tracks 5–8)

== Personnel ==
- Herbie Mann - flute
- Dave Pike - vibes
- Earl May - bass
- Bruno Carr - drums
- Carlos "Patato" Valdes - conga
- Jimmy Owens - trumpet
- John Hitchcock - trombone
- Joe Orange - trombone
- Oliver Nelson - arranger & conductor
- Tom Dowd - recording engineer

== Samples ==
- "Today"
  - "Otha Fish"" by The Pharcyde on their Bizarre Ride II the Pharcyde album
