= Hagood Hardy =

American-born Canadian musician (1937–1997)

- Gordon F. Henderson (left) presents Hardy the Harold Moon award (from RPM magazine)

Background information
- Born: Hugh Hagood Hardy; February 26, 1937; Angola, Indiana, U.S.
- Died: January 1, 1997 (aged 59) Hamilton, Ontario, Canada
- Occupations: Composer, arranger, musician
- Instruments: Piano, vibraphone, percussions

Hugh Hagood Hardy, CM (February 26, 1937 – January 1, 1997) was a Canadian composer, pianist, and vibraphonist. He played mainly jazz and easy listening music. He is best known for the 1975 single, "The Homecoming" from his album of the same name, and for his soundtrack to the Anne of Green Gables and Anne of Avonlea films.

== Early life ==
Hardy was born in Angola, Indiana. His mother was an American citizen. Hardy came to Canada as an infant settling in Brantford and grew up in Oakville, Ontario. He received a Bachelor of Arts degree from Trinity College, Toronto, and studied music privately in Toronto with Gordon Delamont. As a young man he participated in bebop jam sessions on Gerrard Street in Toronto. In the 1960s he played vibraphone in the bands of Martin Denny, Gigi Gryce, Herbie Mann, and George Shearing.

== Career ==
Hardy performed with Herbie Mann on the latter's 1961 recording Herbie Mann at the Village Gate. The session includes the jazz standard "Comin' Home Baby" and the Gershwin classic, "Summertime". This version of "Summertime" was later "covered" by the 1990s rock group Sublime in their hit song "Doin' Time."

Hardy released a number of singles in the early 1970s. His single "Just a Little Lovin'" appeared on the RPM Adult Contemporary chart in 1971, and "The Garden Path" was on the chart in 1972. Hardy's tune "The Homecoming" was used 1972 as music to a TV commercial for Salada tea. It was later included on an album of the same name.

Hardy set up an independent record label, Isis, through his Toronto company, Hagood Hardy Productions, and released "The Homecoming" as a single in 1975. It climbed the charts, rising to 14 in Canada, and in the US number 41 on the pop and number 6 on the easy listening charts, and was certified Gold in Canada, where it reached number one on the Canadian Adult Contemporary chart.

Hardy won Juno Awards in 1976 and 1977 as instrumentalist of the year, and in 1976 as composer of the year. He was named instrumental artist of the year by Billboard magazine.

Hardy wrote the scores for the 1982 film Mazes and Monsters, the 1985 film Anne of Green Gables and the sequel, Anne of Avonlea.

In 1992, he was made a Member of the Order of Canada.

In the 1995 provincial election he was the candidate for the Ontario Liberal Party in the riding of York South and faced local MPP and Premier of Ontario Bob Rae. The Ontario Liberals faltered in the election, and Hardy lost to Rae.

== Personal life and death ==
His great-uncle was Arthur Sturgis Hardy, a Liberal politician who served as Ontario's fourth premier from 1896 to 1899.

Hardy died from lymphoma on January 1, 1997, at the age of 59. He was survived by four children.

== Selected discography ==
with Herbie Mann

- Herbie Mann at the Village Gate (Atlantic, 1961)
- Herbie Mann Returns to the Village Gate (Atlantic, 1961 [1963])
- Right Now (Atlantic, 1962)
- Brazil, Bossa Nova & Blues (United Artists, 1962)

Solo albums

- Stop 33 (RCA Victor, 1967)
- Montage (GRT, 1972)
- The Homecoming (Attic, 1975)
- Maybe Tomorrow (Attic, 1976)
- Tell Me My Name (Attic, 1977)
- Reflections (Attic, 1978)
- As Time Goes By (Attic 1980)
- The Christmas Album (Attic, 1980)
- Love Me Closer (Attic, 1982)
- Chasing a Dream (Duke Street, 1983)
- Night Magic (Duke Street, 1985)
- Hagood Hardy (Duke Street, 1986)
- In My Heart (Duke Street, 1992)
- Morocco (Sackville, 1989)
- After Hours (Isis, 1995)
- Alone (Isis, 1995)
- Between Friends (Isis, 1996)
- My Song (Channel, 1996)
