= Spanish Blues Band =

Studio album by Willie Bobo
- Released: 1968
- Recorded: February 9, 12 16 & 19 and March 4 & 12, 1968; New York City
- Genre: Jazz
- Label: Verve; V/V6 8736
- Producer: Pete Spargo, Teddy Reig

Willie Bobo chronology
Bobo Motion (1967)	Spanish Blues Band (1968)	A New Dimension (1968)

Spanish Blues Band is an album by American jazz percussionist Willie Bobo recorded in 1968 and released on the Verve label.

== Reception ==
Professional ratings
Review scores
Source	Rating
Allmusic	3/5 stars

Allmusic awarded the album three stars out of five.

== Track listing ==
1. "Tweedlee Dee" (Winfield Scott) - 2:22
2. "I Heard It Through the Grapevine" (Norman Whitfield, Barrett Strong) - 3:05
3. "I Wish It Would Rain" (Whitfield, Strong, Roger Penzabene) - 4:42
4. "Bad, Bad Whiskey" (Amos Milburn) - 2:30
5. "I Want To Walk You Home" (Fats Domino) - 2:29
6. "Walk Away Renée" (Michael Brown, Bob Calilli, Tony Sansone) - 3:02
7. "Move On Over" (Bert Keyes, Willie Bob) - 2:59
8. "Stuff" (Clarence "Sonny" Henry) - 2:41
9. "(Sittin' On) The Dock of the Bay" (Otis Redding, Steve Cropper) - 2:42
10. "Many Tears Ago" (Scott) - 3:10
11. "Soul Cookin'" (Dave Clowney) - 2:21
- Recorded in New York City on February 9 (tracks 4 & 8), February 12 (tracks 1, 2 & 5), February 16 (track 11), February 19 (track 9), March 4 (tracks 3, 6 & 10) and March 12 (track 7), 1968

== Personnel ==
- Willie Bobo - timbales, percussion
- Unidentified musicians
- Bert DeCoteaux (tracks: 3, 6 & 10), Bert Keyes (tracks: 1, 2, 4, 5, 7, 9 & 11), Clarence "Sonny" Henry (track 8) - arranger
