= Latin Mann =

Studio album by Herbie Mann
- Released: 1965
- Recorded: June 1–2, 1965; New York City
- Genre: Latin Jazz
- Length: 42:10
- Label: Columbia; CL 2388
- Producer: Tom Wilson

Herbie Mann chronology
Monday Night at the Village Gate (1965)	Latin Mann (1965)	Standing Ovation at Newport (1965)

Latin Mann (subtitled Afro to Bossa to Blues) is an album by American jazz flautist Herbie Mann recorded for the Columbia label and released in 1965. Mann's contract with Atlantic Records allowed him to record the album for another label.

== Reception ==
Professional ratings
Review scores
Source	Rating
AllMusic	3/5 stars

AllMusic awarded the album 3 stars.

== Track listing ==
1. "Let's Boom Chitty Boom" (Herbie Mann) - 3:23
2. "What'd I Say" (Ray Charles) - 4:59
3. "Señor Blues" (Horace Silver) - 3:52
4. "Bijou" (Ralph Burns) - 3:25
5. "Jungle Fantasy" (Esy Morales) - 3:54
6. "Watermelon Man" (Herbie Hancock) - 4:09
7. "Interlude" (Pete Rugolo) - 4:14
8. "The Jive Samba" (Nat Adderley) - 5:03
9. "Ave Maria Morena" (Fausto Curbelo) - 4:36
10. "Manteca" (Dizzy Gillespie, Chano Pozo, Gil Fuller) - 4:35
- Recorded in New York City on June 1, 1965 (tracks 2, 4, 7 & 10), June 2, 1965 (tracks 1, 3, 6 & 8) and June 24, 1965 (tracks 5 & 9)

== Personnel ==
- Herbie Mann - flute
- Carmell Jones, Jerry Kail, Joe Newman, Ernie Royal - trumpet
- John Hitchcock, Mark Weinstein - trombone
- Quentin Jackson, Tony Studd - bass trombone
- Danny Bank - bass clarinet
- Jimmy Heath - tenor saxophone
- Dave Pike - vibraphone
- Chick Corea, Charlie Palmieri - piano
- Earl May, Bobby Rodriguez - bass
- Bruno Carr - drums
- Carlos "Patato" Valdes - congas
- José Mangual - bongos
- Willie Bobo, Tommy Lopez, Willie Rodriguez, Carlos Diaz, Rafael De Vila, Raymond Sardinis - percussion
- Oliver Nelson - arranger, conductor
