= Bobo Motion =

Studio album by Willie Bobo
- Released: 1967
- Recorded: July 20 & 27, 1967
- Studio: New York City and Van Gelder Studio, Englewood Cliffs, NJ
- Genre: Jazz
- Length: 26:23
- Label: Verve; V6-8699
- Producer: Pete Spargo, Teddy Reig

Willie Bobo chronology
Juicy (1967)	Bobo Motion (1967)	Spanish Blues Band (1968)

Bobo Motion is an album by jazz percussionist Willie Bobo recorded in 1967 and released on the Verve label.

== Reception ==
Professional ratings
Review scores
Source	Rating
AllMusic	4/5 stars

The AllMusic review by Thom Jurek states "Bobo Motion is one of percussionist Willie Bobo's best-known recordings of the 1960s... the grooves are tighter and more sophisticated, and the drumming is mixed way up above an uncredited smaller combo... The tune selection is also weirder and reflects the range of Bobo' eclectic tastes, and turns more firmly toward jazz... Recommended".

== Track listing ==
1. "Up, Up & Away" (Jimmy Webb) - 1:57
2. "Ain't That Right" (Arthur Sterling) - 2:37
3. "Midnight Sun" (Lionel Hampton, Johnny Mercer) - 2:09
4. "Cute" (Neal Hefti) - 1:53
5. "I Don't Know" (Clarence "Sonny" Henry) - 2:34
6. "Tuxedo Junction" (Julian Dash, Buddy Feyne, Erskine Hawkins) - 2:17
7. "Evil Ways" (Henry) - 2:41
8. "Show Me" (Joe Tex) - 2:16
9. "Black Coffee" (Sonny Burke, Paul Francis Webster) - 2:44
10. "Night Walk" (Steve Huffsteter) - 3:07
11. "La Bamba" (Traditional) - 2:08
- Recorded in New York City on July 20 (tracks 4, 6 & 9–11) at Van Gelder Studio in Englewood Cliffs, NJ on July 27 (tracks 1–3, 5, 7 & 8), 1967

== Personnel ==
- Willie Bobo - timbales
- Clarence "Sonny" Henry - guitar, arranger
- Bert Keys - arranger
- Uncredited musicians
