= Pike's Peak (album) =

Studio album by Dave Pike Quartet
- Released: 1962
- Recorded: November 1961; New York City
- Genre: Jazz
- Length: 36:00
- Label: Epic; LA 16025
- Producer: Mike Berniker

Dave Pike chronology
It's Time for Dave Pike (1961)	Pike's Peak (1962)	Bossa Nova Carnival (1962)

Pike's Peak is the second album by American jazz vibraphonist Dave Pike which was recorded in 1961 for the Epic label.

== Reception ==
Professional ratings
Review scores
Source	Rating
Allmusic	4/5 stars

The Allmusic review called it: "An excellent if generally overlooked straight-ahead set".

== Track listing ==
1. "Why Not" (Dave Pike) - 6:51
2. "In a Sentimental Mood" (Duke Ellington) - 6:37
3. "Vierd Blues" (Miles Davis) - 6:02
4. "Bésame Mucho" (Consuelo Velázquez) - 6:57
5. "Wild Is the Wind" (Dimitri Tiomkin, Ned Washington) - 9:33

== Personnel ==
- Dave Pike - vibraphone
- Bill Evans - piano
- Herbie Lewis - bass
- Walter Perkins - drums
