= Don Friedman =

American jazz pianist

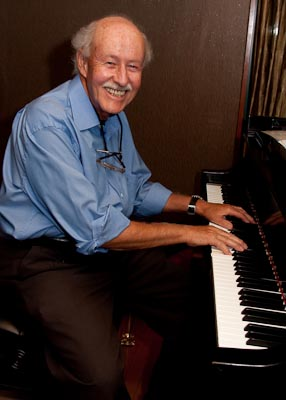
- Don Friedman at the Kitano Jazz Lounge, September 2009

Background information
- Born: Donald Ernest Friedman; May 4, 1935; San Francisco, California, U.S.
- Died: June 30, 2016 (aged 81) The Bronx, New York
- Genres: Jazz
- Occupations: Musician, composer, bandleader
- Instrument: Piano
- Website: www.donfriedman.net

Donald Ernest Friedman (May 4, 1935 – June 30, 2016) was an American jazz pianist. He began playing in Los Angeles and moved to New York in 1958. In the 1960s, he played with both modern stylists and more traditional musicians.

== Early life ==
Friedman was born on May 4, 1935, in San Francisco. Both of his parents immigrated to the United States: his father, Edward Friedman, was from Lithuania, and his mother, Alma Loew, was from Germany. He began playing the piano at the age of four, switching from classical music to jazz after his family moved to Los Angeles when he was fifteen. His early jazz piano influence was Bud Powell. Friedman briefly studied composition at Los Angeles City College.

== Later life and career ==
On the West Coast, Friedman performed with Dexter Gordon, Chet Baker, Buddy DeFranco, and Ornette Coleman. He was also a member of Clark Terry's big band.

Friedman moved to New York permanently in 1958. In the 1960s, Friedman played with both modern jazz and more traditionally orientated musicians. The former included Coleman, Eric Dolphy, Jimmy Giuffre, Booker Little, and Attila Zoller; the latter included Bobby Hackett and Herbie Mann. Friedman's first album as a leader was A Day in the City, in 1961. Some of his early albums received top ratings from DownBeat, which also gave him its critics' poll New Star award. He was also an educator in New York. He had many fans in Japan.

Friedman married three times; the first two ended in divorce. He died of pancreatic cancer, at home in the Bronx on June 30, 2016. Survivors were one daughter, actress and writer Lynn Adrianna Friedman, and a granddaughter.

== Discography ==
=== As leader/co-leader ===
| Recording date | Title | Label | Year released | Personnel |
|---|---|---|---|---|
| 1961-06-12 | A Day in the City | Riverside | 1961 | Trio, with Chuck Israels (bass), Joe Hunt (drums) |
| 1962-05-14 | Circle Waltz | Riverside | 1962 | One track solo piano; other tracks trio, with Chuck Israels (bass), Pete LaRoca (drums) |
| 1963-05-16 | Flashback | Riverside | 1963 | Trio, with Dick Kniss (bass), Dick Berk (drums) |
| 1964 | Dreams and Explorations | Riverside | 1964 | Quartet, with Attila Zoller (guitar), Dick Kniss (bass), Dick Berk (drums) |
| 1966-02-22 | Metamorphosis | Prestige | 1966 | Quartet, with Attila Zoller (guitar), Richard Davis (bass), Joe Chambers (drums) |
| 1975-07-08, -09 | Hope for Tomorrow | East Wind | 1975 | Trio, with Lyn Christie (bass, electric bass), Bill Goodwin (drums) |
| 1977-09-17 | Jazz Dancing | Progressive | 2015 | Trio, with Frank Luther (bass), Ronnie Bedford (drums) |
| 1978-02-26, -27 | Later Circle | RCA | 1978 | Trio, with George Mraz (bass), Ronnie Bedford (drums) |
| 1978-03-21 | The Progressive | Progressive | 1978 | Trio, with Frank Luther (bass), Billy Hart (drums) |
| 1978-06-26 | Hot Knepper and Pepper | Progressive | 1994 | Co-leader with Pepper Adams (baritone sax); with Jimmy Knepper (trombone), George Mraz (bass), Billy Hart (drums) |
| 1978-08-30 | Invitation | Progressive | 1993 | Trio, with George Mraz (bass), Ronnie Bedford (drums) |
| 1978-09 | The Way We Were | Progressive | 1981 | Trio 1, with George Mraz (bass), Ronnie Bedford (drums). Trio 2, with Frank Luther (bass), Billy Hart (drums). |
| 1978-09-09 | The Don Friedman Trio also released as Love Music (2018) | Progressive | 1979 | Trio, with Frank Luther (bass), Billy Hart (drums) |
| 1979-05-20 | Themes and Variations | EGO | 1979 | Solo piano |
| 1979-07-22 | Don Friedman | Swedisc | 1980 | Trio, Marc Johnson (bass), Heinz Lied (drums) |
| 1979-11-08 | Half & Half | Insights | 1997 | Duo, with Red Mitchell (bass) |
| 1979-11-12 | Avenue of The Americas | Owl | 1980 | Solo piano |
| 1984-09-22 | I Hear a Rhapsody | Stash | 1985 | Solo piano |
| 1961, 1985-10-31 | Memories for Scotty | Insights | 1988 | Trio 1, with Scott LaFaro (bass), Pete LaRoca (drums). Trio 2, with Chuck Israels (bass), Joe Hunt (drums). Solo piano in 1985. Trio 1 tracks were reissued by Resonance Records in 2009 on Pieces of Jade. |
| 1985-10-31 | Stella by Starlight | Insights | 1994 | Solo piano; recorded Kukisaki Kenmin Center in Ibaraki Prefecture |
| 1987-04-16 | Sweet View: Live in Japan | Apollon | 1988 | Co-leader duo, with Eiji Nakayama (bass); in concert |
| 1987-04-21 | Far Away Land | Break Time | 1987 | Co-leader duo, with Eiji Nakayama (bass) |
| 1992-04-12, -13 | Opus D'Amour | Sackville | 1992 | Co-leader duo, with Don Thompson (bass) |
| 1993-09-05 | Don Friedman at Maybeck | Concord | 1994 | Solo piano; in concert |
| 1995-03-13 | The Days of Wine and Roses | Soul Note | 1996 | Trio, with Marco Ricci (bass), Giampiero Prina (drums) |
| 1995-03-30 | Thingin' | HatART | 1996 | Trio, with Lee Konitz (alto sax), Attila Zoller (guitar); in concert |
| 1995-04 | Almost Everything | SteepleChase | 1995 | Trio, with Ron McClure (bass), Matt Wilson (drums) |
| 1996-10-03, -04 | Red Sky Waltz | Alfa | 1996 | Trio, with Santi Debriano (bass), Akira Tana (drums) |
| 1996-11-09 | My Romance: Solo Piano | SteepleChase | 1997 | Solo piano |
| 1997-07 | Prism | Abeat | 1997 | Trio, with Marco Ricci (bass), Stefano Bagnoli (drums) |
| 1998 | Match Point | TBR | 2000 | Most tracks quartet, with Tom Butts (tenor sax), Gary Mazzaroppi (bass), Frank Ferreri (drums); two tracks quintet, with Alyse Levy (vocals) added |
| 1999-01-29 | Attila's Dreams | Ephemeris Jazz | 2001 | Quartet, with Andrew Cheshire (guitar), Ron McClure (bass), Joey Baron (drums) |
| 1999-10-15 | Standards in Cagliari | Soul Note | 2003 | Trio, with Jeff Fuller (bass), Tommy Bradascio (drums); in concert |
| 2000-04 | My Foolish Heart | SteepleChase | 2003 | Quartet, with Jed Levy (tenor sax), Tim Ferguson (bass), Tony Jefferso (drums) |
| 2002-05-28 | Waltz for Debby | Eighty-Eight's | 2003 | One track solo piano; other tracks trio, with George Mraz (bass), Lewis Nash (drums) |
| 2003-05-14, 2003-07-07 | Hot House | Chiaroscuro | 2004 | Quartet, with Tim Armacost (tenor sax), Ron McClure (bass), Tony Jefferson (drums) |
| 2003-10-13 | My Favorite Things | Eighty-Eight's | 2004 | One track solo piano; other tracks trio, with George Mraz (bass), Lewis Nash (drums) |
| 2003-10-14 | Timeless | Eighty-Eight's | 2004 | VIP Trio, with John Patitucci (bass), Omar Hakim (drums) |
| 2004-07-03 | Salzau Trio Live at Jazz Baltica | Skip | 2005 | Trio, with Martin Wind (bass), Terri Lyne Carrington (drums); in concert at Jazz Baltica |
| 2005-03-07 | Scarborough Fair | Eighty-Eight's | 2005 | VIP Trio, with Ron Carter (bass), Omar Hakim (drums) |
| 2005-11 | Piano Works VI: From A To Z | ACT | 2006 | Solo piano |
| 2006-09-08 | Moon River: New York Monologue | Eighty-Eight's | 2007 | Solo piano |
| 2007-03-03, -04 | Waltz for Marilyn | Jazz Excursion | 2007 | Quartet, with Peter Bernstein (guitar), Martin Wind (bass), Tony Jefferson (drums) |
| 2007-07-26 | Straight Ahead | No Coast Jazz | 2008 | Trio, with Chuck Israels (bass), Joe Hunt (drums) |
| 2008-07-06 | Alone Together | Edition Longplay | 2013 | Co-leader piano duet with Hank Jones, plus Martin Wind (bass), Matt Wilson (drums) |
| 2008-11-15, -16 | I'd Like to Tell You | Music Center | 2009 | Trio, with Attilio Zanchi (bass), Tommy Bradascio (drums) |
| 2009-07-04 | The Composer Live At Jazz Baltica Salzau | Enja | 2009 | With Gary Smulyan (baritone sax), Martin Wind (bass), Joe LaBarbera (drums), Gerður Gunnarsdóttir and Elfa Run Kristinsdóttir (violin), Martin Stupka (viola), Stephan Braun (cello); in concert |
| 2010-03-31 | Circle Waltz 21C | Eighty-Eight's | 2010 | Trio, with George Mraz (bass), Lewis Nash (drums) |
| 2011-07-02 | Don Friedman Plays Don Friedman | Edition Longplay | 2012 | Solo piano |
| 2015-04-10 | Nite Lites | Fresh Sound | 2015 | Trio, with Harvie S (bass), Klemens Marktl (drums) |

=== As a member ===
Reuben Hoch and Time
(with Reuben Hoch and Ed Schuller)

- Of Recent Time (Naim, 2006)

=== As sideman ===
With Booker Little

- Out Front (Candid, 1961)
- Booker Little and Friend (Bethlehem, 1961)

With Herbie Mann

- 1963: Herbie Mann Live at Newport (Atlantic, 1963)
- 1964: My Kinda Groove (Atlantic, 1965)
- 1960-1966: Our Mann Flute (Atlantic, 1966)
- 1964-1967 The Beat Goes On (Atlantic, 1967)

With Eiji Nakayama

- Conversation (Art Union, 1986)
- Sweet View: Eiji Nakayama Don Friedman Live in Japan (Jazz Road, 1987)
- Legend of the Lake (Jazz Road, 1988)

With Dave Pike

- Manhattan Latin (Decca, 1964)
- The Doors of Perception (Vortex, 1970) – rec. 1966

With Yuko Shigeno

- Shiny Stockings (Space Shower Music, 2011)
- Circle Waltz with Don Friedman (24 Jazz Japan, 2013)

With Hiromi Shimizu

- Waltz Tenderly (Jazz on Top, 2008)
- Live at Jazz on Top (Jazz on Top, 2010) – live

With Clark Terry

- It's What's Happenin' (Impulse!, 1967)
- In Concert: Live (Etoile, 1973) – live rec. 1970
- Portraits (Chesky, 1989) – rec. 1988
- Live on QE2 (Chiaroscuro, 2001) – live rec. 1999
- Friendship (Eighty-Eight's, 2002) – also with Max Roach

With others

- Buddy Collette, Nice Day with Buddy Collette (Contemporary, 1957)
- Shauli Einav, "Generations" (Posi-Tone, 2013)
- Bruno De Filippi, In New York With Don Friedman Trio (Carosello, 1992)
- Herb Geller, At The Movies (Hep Jazz, 2007)
- Lee Konitz, Lee Konitz Meets Don Friedman (Insights, 1994)
- Hank De Mano, Listen to The Hank De Mano Quartet (Freeway Jazz, 1956)
- John Handy, No Coast Jazz (Roulette, 1960)
- Joe Henderson, Tetragon (Milestone, 1968)
- Elvin Jones, And Then Again (Atlantic, 1965)
- Don Lanphere, Into Somewhere (Hep, 1983)
- Charles Lloyd, Discovery! (Columbia, 1964)
- Nicole Pasternak, In A Word (Garagista Music, 2005)
- Sal Salvador Quintet, In Our Own Sweet Way (Stash, 1983)
- Grady Tate, She Is My Lady (Janus, 1972)
- Attila Zoller, The Horizon Beyond (EmArcy, 1965)
