= Bossa Nova Carnival =

Studio album by Dave Pike
- Released: November 1962
- Recorded: September 6–7, 1962
- Studio: Van Gelder Studio, Englewood Cliffs
- Genre: Jazz
- Length: 39:18
- Label: New Jazz; NJ 8281
- Producer: Elliot Mazer

Dave Pike chronology
Pike's Peak (1961)	Bossa Nova Carnival (1962)	Limbo Carnival (1962)

Bossa Nova Carnival is an album by American jazz vibraphonist Dave Pike performing compositions by João Donato which was recorded in 1962 for the New Jazz label.

== Reception ==
Professional ratings
Review scores
Source	Rating
AllMusic	4.5/5 stars

AllMusic awarded the album 4½ stars and in the review by Alex Henderson, he states, "Bossa Nova Carnival wasn't an exercise in knee-jerk, insincere bandwagon jumping. Pike wanted to make a meaningful, individualistic contribution to Brazilian jazz. So instead of doing exactly what Getz, Gilberto, and Charlie Byrd were doing and performing a lot of Jobim songs, he enlisted Brazilian composer João Donato. Everything on this excellent vinyl LP was written by Donato, who provides sensuous, caressing melodies that Pike and his sidemen (who include Kenny Burrell on guitar and Clark Terry on flügelhorn) bring a lot of warmth and sensitivity to. The music swings, but it does so in a subtle, mellow, consistently melodic fashion. Undeniably one of Pike's most essential albums".

== Track listing ==
All compositions by João Donato

1. "Samba Lero" – 4:41
2. "Sono" – 5:36
3. "Serenidade" – 5:14
4. "Carnival Samba" – 4:27
5. "Philumba" – 5:18
6. "Melvalita" – 4:02
7. "Ginha" – 3:56
8. "Sausalito" – 6:04

Note

- Recorded at Van Gelder Studio in Englewood Cliffs, New Jersey on September 6, 1962 (tracks 2, 4, 5 & 7) and September 7, 1962 (tracks 1, 3, 6 & 8)

== Personnel ==
- Dave Pike – vibraphone, marimba
- Clark Terry – flugelhorn (tracks 2, 4, 5 & 7)
- Kenny Burrell – guitar
- Chris White – bass
- Rudy Collins – drums
- Jose Paulo – cabasa, bandero
