= Let's Go Bobo! =

Studio album by Willie Bobo
- Released: 1964
- Recorded: 1964
- Genre: Latin jazz
- Label: Roulette; SR 25272
- Producer: Teddy Reig

Willie Bobo chronology
| Bobo's Beat (1963) | Let's Go Bobo! (1964) | Spanish Grease (1965) |

Let's Go Bobo! is an album by jazz percussionist Willie Bobo released in 1964 and his last on the Roulette label.

== Reception ==
Professional ratings
Review scores
| Source | Rating |
|---|---|
| Allmusic | 4/5 stars |

Allmusic awarded the album 4 stars.

== Track listing ==
All compositions by Teacho Wiltshire except as indicated

1. "Let's Go Bobo" (Gus Tillman, Joe James) - 2:47
2. "Caribe" (Willie "Bobo" Correa) - 2:45
3. "Twist The Monkey's Tail" (David Burns) - 2:45
4. "Tell It Like It Is" (Burns) - 2:45
5. "Get Crackin'" - 2:45
6. "Wild Rice" - 2:30
7. "The Hip Monkey" - 3:31
8. "Trinidad" - 2:55
9. "Timbale Groove" - 2:45
10. "Go Go Go" - 2:37
11. "Be's The Other Way" (Burns) - 2:22
12. "A La Bobo" (Burns, Correa) - 2:52

== Personnel ==
- Willie Bobo - drums, timbales, percussion
- Unidentified Orchestra
