= Flashback (Don Friedman album) =

Studio album by Don Friedman
- Released: 1963
- Recorded: May 16, 1963
- Studio: Plaza Sound Studios, New York City
- Genre: Jazz
- Length: 40:50
- Label: Riverside; RLP 463

Don Friedman chronology
Circle Waltz (1962)	Flashback (1963)	Dreams and Explorations (1964)

Flashback is the third album by pianist Don Friedman which was recorded in 1963 and released on the Riverside label.

== Reception ==
Professional ratings
Review scores
Source	Rating
AllMusic	4/5 stars
The Penguin Guide to Jazz Recordings	3/4 stars

The AllMusic review by Scott Yanow stated: "The pianist shows that he was developing an original voice and was familiar with the avant-garde of the period... A fine, well-rounded set from the underrated pianist".

== Track listing ==
All compositions by Don Friedman, except as indicated

1. "Alone Together" (Howard Dietz, Arthur Schwartz) – 4:38
2. "Ballade in C-Sharp Minor" – 6:25
3. "Wait 'Til You See Her" (Lorenz Hart, Richard Rodgers) – 4:18
4. "News Blues" – 4:59
5. "Ochre (Theme-Solo-Duet-Theme)" – 7:45
6. "How Deep Is the Ocean?" (Irving Berlin) – 5:49
7. "Flashback" – 6:56

== Personnel ==
- Don Friedman – piano
- Dick Kniss – bass
- Dick Berk – drums
