= Juicy (album) =

Studio album by Willie Bobo
- Released: 1967
- Recorded: January 12 & 31 and February 1 & 4, 1967; New York City
- Genre: Jazz
- Length: 47:41
- Label: Verve; V6-8685
- Producer: Pete Spargo, Teddy Reig

Willie Bobo chronology
Feelin' So Good (1966)	Juicy (1967)	Bobo Motion (1967)

Juicy is an album by jazz percussionist Willie Bobo recorded in 1967 and released on the Verve label.

== Reception ==
Professional ratings
Review scores
Source	Rating
Allmusic	3.5/5 stars

The Allmusic review by Stewart Mason awarded the album 3½ stars, stating, "From the lubricious title and cover photo on down, there's a certain 'swingin' at Hef's pad' vibe to the proceedings that makes this album of particular interest to latter-day hipsters. Most of the song selection consists of soul-jazz covers of popular hits of the day, but the real standouts are the small handful of band originals, particularly the fiery groove of the title track".

== Track listing ==
1. "Knock on Wood" (Steve Cropper, Eddie Floyd) - 2:40
2. "Mating Call" (Bert Keyes) - 3:03
3. "Mercy, Mercy, Mercy" (Joe Zawinul) - 2:33
4. "Felicidad" (Clarence "Sonny" Henry) - 3:17
5. "La Descarga del Bobo" (Willie Bobo) - 5:38
6. "Juicy" (Mike Stoller) - 3:26
7. "Ain't Too Proud to Beg" (Norman Whitfield, Edward Holland, Jr.) - 2:42
8. "Music to Watch Girls By" (Sid Ramin) - 2:18
9. "Dreams" (Val Valentín) - 3:24
10. "Dis-Advantages" (Mitch Leigh) - 2:01
11. "Roots" (Henry) - 3:13
12. "Shing-a-Ling Baby" (Val Valentín, Willie Bobo) - 3:04
13. "Juicy" [alternate take] (Stoller) - 2:19 Bonus track on CD reissue
14. "Music to Watch Girls By" [alternate take] (Ramin) - 2:26 Bonus track on CD reissue
15. "Dis-Advantages" [alternate take] (Leigh) - 2:01 Bonus track on CD reissue
16. "Shing-a-Ling Baby" [alternate take] (Valentín, Bobo) - 3:36 Bonus track on CD reissue
- Recorded in New York City January 12 (tracks 6, 12, 13 & 16), January 31 (tracks 3, 4, 9 & 11), February 1 (tracks 1, 7, 8, 10, 14 & 15) and February 4 (tracks 2 & 5), 1967.

== Personnel ==
- Willie Bobo - timbales
- Melvin Lastie - cornet
- Bobby Brown - alto saxophone, tenor saxophone
- Clarence "Sonny" Henry - guitar
- Unknown - bass
- Unknown - percussion
