= Sophisticated Funk =

Studio album by Jack McDuff
- Released: 1976
- Recorded: 1976; All Platinum Studios, Englewood, New Jersey
- Genre: Jazz
- Label: Chess; ACH-19004
- Producer: Billy Jones

Jack McDuff chronology
Magnetic Feel (1975)	Sophisticated Funk (1976)	Kisses (1980)

Professional ratings
Review scores
Source	Rating
Allmusic	2/5 stars

Sophisticated Funk is an album by organist Jack McDuff recorded in 1976 and released on the Chess label.

== Reception ==
The Allmusic site awarded the album 2 stars stating "This forgettable effort from Jack McDuff veers far too close to smooth jazz territory for comfort -- swapping his signature Hammond B-3 for keyboards, McDuff settles for a fusion sound suggesting a particularly tepid CTI session, with none of the swagger and groove of his most memorable records".

== Track listing ==
All compositions by Jack McDuff and Billy Jones except as indicated

1. "Dit Da Dit" - 6:00
2. "Ju Ju" (Billy Jones) - 6:49
3. "To Be Named Later" - 4:50
4. "Summer Dream" - 4:50
5. "Jack's Boogie" - 3:32
6. "Mini Pads" - 5:50
7. "Electric Surf Board" (Jack McDuff) - 5:17
8. "Mannix Theme" (Lalo Schifrin) - 3:26

== Personnel ==
- Jack McDuff - organ, piano, electric piano
- Joe Farrell - saxophones, flute
- Brian Cuomo - piano
- Robert Banks, Walter Morris - guitar
- Billy Jones - guitar, percussion
- Frank Prescod - electric bass
- Joe Corsello, Ted McKinsey, Clarence Oliver, Arnold Ramsey, Scott Schoer - drums
- Craig Derry, Scott Saunders - congas, percussion
