= Manhattan Latin =

Studio album by Dave Pike and His Orchestra
- Released: 1964
- Recorded: February 11, March 21 and April, 1964; New York City
- Genre: Jazz, Latin jazz
- Length: 39:38
- Label: Decca; DL 4568

Dave Pike chronology
Dave Pike Plays the Jazz Version of Oliver! (1962)	Manhattan Latin (1964)	Jazz for the Jet Set (1965)

Manhattan Latin (subtitled The Sensuous Rhythms of Spanish Harlem) is an album by American jazz vibraphonist Dave Pike which was recorded in 1964 for the Decca label. The album is among Chick Corea's earliest recordings

== Reception ==
Professional ratings
Review scores
Source	Rating
Allmusic	4/5 stars
The Penguin Guide to Jazz Recordings	3/4 stars

The Allmusic site awarded the album 4 stars stating "Manhattan Latin captures Dave Pike in flux between the straight-ahead approach of his earlier sessions and the psychedelic pop-jazz of his efforts for MPS: a playful yet methodical immersion into pure, sunkissed groove, its artful assimilation of global rhythms and textures anticipates the direction of Pike's most memorable work".

== Track listing ==
All compositions by Dave Pike except as indicated

1. "Baby" - 2:49
2. "Que Mal Es Querer" (Arsenio Rodríguez) - 3:18
3. "Not a Tear" (Rudy Stevenson) - 4:01
4. "Mambo Dinero" - 2:39
5. "Montuno Orita" - 3:23
6. "Aphrodite" - 3:16
7. "La Playa" - 3:06
8. "Latin Blues" - 2:56
9. "South Sea" (Stevenson) - 2:38
10. "Sandunga" - 2:41
11. "Dream Garden" - 3:25
12. "Vikki" - 5:26

== Personnel ==
- Dave Pike - vibraphone
- Dave Burns - trumpet
- Ray Copeland - flugelhorn
- Hubert Laws - piccolo, tenor saxophone (tracks 2, 3, 5 & 7)
- Joseph Grimaldi - flute (tracks 4, 6, 8 & 9)
- Chick Corea (tracks 1–3, 5, 7 & 10), Don Friedman (tracks 4, 6, 8 & 9) - piano
- Attila Zoller - guitar (tracks 4, 6, 8 & 9)
- Israel "Cachao" Lopez (tracks 1–3, 5, 7 & 10), Jack Six (tracks 4, 6, 8 & 9) - bass
- Carlos "Patato" Valdes - congas
- Bobby Thomas - percussion (tracks 2, 3, 5 & 7)
- Willie Bobo - drums
