= Bobo's Beat =

Studio album by Willie Bobo
- Released: 1963
- Recorded: October 11, 1962, in New York City
- Genre: Jazz
- Length: 39:24
- Label: Roulette; SR 52097
- Producer: Teddy Reig

Willie Bobo chronology
Do That Thing/Guajira (1963)	Bobo's Beat (1963)	Let's Go Bobo! (1964)

Bobo's Beat is an album by jazz percussionist Willie Bobo recorded in late 1962 and released on the Roulette label.

== Reception ==
Professional ratings
Review scores
Source	Rating
AllMusic	4/5 stars

The AllMusic review by John Bush states "Bobo's Beat is a jazz fan's delight: great work from all the principles, and a steady sense of inter-relational talents sounding off in close harmony with each other".

== Track listing ==
1. "Bon Sueno" (Frank Colon) – 2:30
2. "Naked City Theme" (Billy May) – 2:17
3. "Felicidade" (Antonio Carlos Jobim, Vinícius de Moraes) – 3:28
4. "Bossa Nova in Blue" (Frank Anderson) – 2:44
5. "Boroquinho" (Roberto Menescal, Christopher Boscole) – 4:30
6. "Crisis" (Freddie Hubbard) – 5:15
7. "Mi Fas y Recordar" (Bill Salter) – 3:56
8. "Capers" (Tom McIntosh) – 3:47
9. "Let Your Hair Down Blues" (Frank Anderson) – 5:13

== Personnel ==
- Willie Bobo – vocals, percussion, timbales
- Clark Terry – trumpet
- Joe Farrell – tenor saxophone
- Frank Anderson – organ, piano
