= Metamorphosis (Don Friedman album) =

Studio album by Don Friedman
- Released: 1966
- Recorded: February 22, 1966
- Studio: Van Gelder Studio, Englewood Cliffs, New Jersey
- Genre: Jazz
- Length: 44:49
- Label: Prestige; PR 7488
- Producer: Cal Lampley

Don Friedman chronology
Dreams and Explorations (1964)	Metamorphosis (1966)	Hope for Tomorrow (1975)

Metamorphosis is the fifth album by pianist Don Friedman which was recorded in 1966 and released on the Prestige label.

== Reception ==
Professional ratings
Review scores
Source	Rating
AllMusic	4.5/5 stars
The Penguin Guide to Jazz Recordings	3.5/4 stars

The AllMusic review by Michael G. Nastos stated: "For Friedman's fifth recording, he is definitely exploring the progressive edges of modern mainstream post-bop... Certainly Friedman challenges listeners with this music, but he also challenges his own abilities and concepts. For the time period, it is one of the most vital, original, progressive statements, and one that, after all these years, retains a timeless freshness that bears not only a second listening, but consideration as a creative music hallmark.".

== Track listing ==
All compositions by Don Friedman, except as indicated

1. "Wakin' Up" – 4:53
2. "Spring Sign" – 11:38
3. "Drive" (Jimmy Giuffre) – 4:47
4. "Extension" (Attila Zoller) – 9:17
5. "Troubadours Groovedour" (Zoller) – 6:44
6. "Dream Bells" (Zoller) – 7:30

== Personnel ==
- Don Friedman – piano
- Attila Zoller – guitar
- Richard Davis – bass
- Joe Chambers – drums
