= My Foolish Heart (Don Friedman album) =

Studio album by Don Friedman
- Released: 2003
- Recorded: April 2000
- Genre: Jazz
- Length: 57:30
- Labels: SteepleChase; SCCD 31534
- Producer: Nils Winther

Don Friedman chronology
Standards in Cagliari (2003)	My Foolish Heart (2003)	Waltz for Debby (2003)

My Foolish Heart is an album by American jazz pianist Don Friedman recorded in 2000 and released on the Danish SteepleChase label in 2003.

== Critical reception ==
Professional ratings
Review scores
Source	Rating
AllMusic	4/5 stars
All About Jazz	4/5 stars
The Penguin Guide to Jazz Recordings	3/4 stars

Chris Kelsey of AllMusic stated: "while Friedman has in the past recorded with more fire, this is a well-executed and rewarding set by a musician who embraces (and exemplifies) the best jazz has to offer". On All About Jazz, Derek Taylor observed: "Sweeping accolades and fame may not be in the cards for Friedman, but based on the strengths of this session the situation doesn’t seem to matter much. He’ll keep doing what he does best, whether there’s a widespread audience or not. For that, listeners in the know should be grateful".

== Track listing ==
All compositions by Don Friedman, except where indicated.

1. "Positivity" (Jed Levy) – 7:46
2. "My Foolish Heart" (Victor Young) – 8:04
3. "Desafinado" (Antônio Carlos Jobim) – 6:45
4. "Memory of Scotty" – 8:39
5. "Bye Bye Blackbird" (Ray Henderson, Mort Dixon) – 7:28
6. "Petite Fleur" (Sidney Bechet) – 6:26
7. "Swans" (Tim Ferguson) – 6:35
8. "Almost Everything" – 5:41

== Personnel ==
- Don Friedman – piano
- Jed Levy – tenor saxophone
- Tim Ferguson – bass
- Tony Jefferson – drums
