= Dreams and Explorations =

Studio album by Don Friedman
- Released: 1964
- Recorded: 1964; New York City
- Genre: Jazz
- Length: 41:37
- Label: Riverside; RLP 485

Don Friedman chronology
Flashback (1963)	Dreams and Explorations (1964)	Metamorphosis (1966)

Dreams and Explorations is the fourth album by pianist Don Friedman which was recorded in 1964 and released on the Riverside label.

== Reception ==
Professional ratings
Review scores
Source	Rating
AllMusic	4/5 stars
The Penguin Guide to Jazz Recordings	3.5/4 stars

AllMusic reviewer Scott Yanow stated: "Overall, this is a fine effort that features the two sides of early Don Friedman."

== Track listing ==
All compositions by Don Friedman, except as indicated

1. "Episodes" – 5:36
2. "Exploration" (Attila Zoller) – 6:21
3. "Park Row" – 5:30
4. "Blizzard" (Zoller) – 5:22
5. "Israel" (John Carisi) – 6:46
6. "Darn That Dream" (Eddie DeLange, Jimmy Van Heusen) – 5:37
7. "You Stepped Out of a Dream" (Nacio Herb Brown, Gus Kahn) – 6:25

== Personnel ==
- Don Friedman – piano
- Attila Zoller – guitar
- Dick Kniss – bass
- Dick Berk – drums
