= Nirvana (Herbie Mann and the Bill Evans Trio album) =

Studio album by Herbie Mann & The Bill Evans Trio
- Released: Early October 1964
- Recorded: December 8, 1961 & May 4, 1962
- Studio: Atlantic, New York City
- Genre: Jazz
- Length: 33:12
- Label: Atlantic; SD 1426
- Producer: Nesuhi Ertegun

Herbie Mann chronology
Brazil, Bossa Nova & Blues (1962)	Nirvana (1964)	Do the Bossa Nova with Herbie Mann (1962)

Bill Evans chronology
Trio 64 (1964)	Nirvana (1964)	Waltz for Debby (1964)

Nirvana is an album by jazz flautist Herbie Mann with Bill Evans's Trio featuring Chuck Israels and Paul Motian, released in 1964 on the Atlantic label and featuring performances recorded in 1961 and 1962.

== Reception ==
The Allmusic review by Ken Dryden states "Mann, who has changed his style numerous times throughout his long career, is heard exclusively in a straight-ahead and bop context on this pair of studio dates. Evans, who studied flute through his college years, rarely recorded with a flutist... though he was fond of the instrument... fans of either Herbie Mann or Bill Evans will want to acquire this enjoyable set."

Professional ratings
Review scores
Source	Rating
Allmusic	3/5 stars
The Penguin Guide to Jazz Recordings	3/4 stars

== Track listing ==
1. "Nirvana" (Herbie Mann) - 5:48
2. "Gymnopedie" (Erik Satie) - 3:16
3. "I Love You" (Cole Porter) - 7:03
4. "Willow Weep for Me" (Ann Ronell) - 5:31
5. "Lover Man" (Jimmy Davis, Ram Ramirez, James Sherman) - 4:49
6. "Cashmere" (Herbie Mann) - 6:45

Recorded on December 8, 1961 (tracks 1 & 3-5) and May 4, 1962 (tracks 2 & 6).

== Personnel ==
- Bill Evans - piano
- Herbie Mann - flute
- Chuck Israels - bass
- Paul Motian - drums
