= My Kinda Groove =

Studio album by Herbie Mann
- Released: 1965
- Recorded: April 6 and May 6–8, 1964; New York City
- Genre: Jazz
- Label: Atlantic; SD 1433
- Producer: Nesuhi Ertegun

Herbie Mann chronology
| Latin Fever (1964) | My Kinda Groove (1965) | Herbie Mann Plays The Roar of the Greasepaint – The Smell of the Crowd (1965) |

My Kinda Groove is an album by American jazz flautist Herbie Mann recorded for the Atlantic label and released in 1965.

== Reception ==
Professional ratings
Review scores
| Source | Rating |
|---|---|
| AllMusic | 3/5 stars |

AllMusic awarded the album 3 stars stating "Although the results are not all that essential, the music is pleasing and typically rhythmic; a good groove".

== Track listing ==
All compositions by Herbie Mann except as indicated

1. "Blues in the Closet" (Oscar Pettiford) - 5:09
2. "Morning After Carnival" - 5:24
3. "Vikki" (Dave Pike) - 7:02
4. "Mushi Mushi" - 3:26
5. "Soul Guajira" (William Correa) - 2:49
6. "Spanish Grits" (René Hernández) - 2:29
7. "Saudade de Bahia" (Dorival Caymmi) - 6:35
- Recorded in New York City on April 6 (tracks 1 & 2), May 6 (tracks 3 & 5), May 7 (tracks 6 & 7) and May 8 (track 4), 1964

== Personnel ==
- Herbie Mann - flute
- Marky Markowitz, Ernie Royal, Clark Terry, Snooky Young - trumpet
- Jimmy Knepper - trombone
- Jerry Dodgion - flute, clarinet, alto saxophone
- Richie Kamuca - clarinet, tenor saxophone
- Charles McCracken, Kermit Moore - cello
- Dave Pike - vibraphone
- Don Friedman - piano
- Attila Zoller - guitar
- Jack Six - bass
- Bobby Thomas - drums
- Willie Bobo - timbales, percussion
- Carlos "Patato" Valdes - congas
- Unidentified string section (tracks 3–7)
- Rene Hernandez (tracks 4–6), Oliver Nelson (tracks 3 & 7) - arranger, conductor
