= The Common Ground =

Studio album by The Herbie Mann Afro-Jazz Sextet + Four Trumpets
- Released: 1960
- Recorded: August 2–3, 1960; NYC
- Genre: Jazz
- Length: 33:55
- Label: Atlantic; SD 1343
- Producer: Nesuhi Ertegun

Herbie Mann chronology
Flute, Brass, Vibes and Percussion (1959)	The Common Ground (1960)	The Family of Mann (1961)

The Common Ground is an album by American jazz flautist Herbie Mann recorded in 1960 for the Atlantic label.

== Reception ==
Professional ratings
Review scores
Source	Rating
Allmusic	3.5/5 stars
The Penguin Guide to Jazz Recordings	3/4 stars

Allmusic awarded the album 3½ stars stating "Most of the instrumental dexterity on the album is supplied by Mann's flute, which perfectly matches the mood of material. For the faithful, The Common Ground delivers an enjoyable (if short) set at the beginning of Mann's long, successful career as a popular artist on Atlantic Records".

== Track listing ==
All compositions by Herbie Mann except as indicated

1. "Baghdad/Asia Minor" (Herbie Mann/Roger Mozian) – 5:09
2. "Walkin'" (Richard Carpenter) – 5:23
3. "Sawa Sawa De'" – 3:05
4. "St. Thomas" (Sonny Rollins) – 3:24
5. "High Life" – 2:11
6. "Uhuru" (Herbie Mann, Michael Olatunji) – 4:55
7. "A Night in Tunisia" (Dizzy Gillespie, Frank Paparelli) – 6:00
8. "The Common Ground" – 3:48

== Personnel ==
- Herbie Mann – flute
- Doc Cheatham, Leo Ball, Jerome Kail, Ziggy Schatz – trumpet
- Johnny Rae – vibraphone
- Knobby Totah – bass
- Rudy Collins – drums
- Ray Barretto – congas
- Ray Mantilla – bongos
- Michael Olatunji – percussion, vocals
- Maya Angelou, Dolores Parker – vocals
