= Dolores Parker =

American jazz singer (1919–2018)

- Born: October 25, 1919; Illinois or New Orleans, Louisiana
- Died: December 17, 2018 (aged 99)
- Genre: Jazz
- Occupation: Singer
- Formerly of: Earl Hines; Duke Ellington; Benny Carter

Dolores Parker (October 25, 1919 – December 17, 2018) was an American jazz singer.

== Career ==
Dolores Parker was born on October 25, 1919, in Illinois or in New Orleans, Louisiana, and started her singing career after winning an amateur contest in Chicago.

She performed with the orchestras of Earl Hines, Duke Ellington, and Benny Carter and appeared in a number of movies, including House of Strangers (1949).

With Ellington, she notably recorded the song "Take Love Easy". "Miss Parker sings [both songs] engagingly," wrote The New Yorker in 1949, reviewing that single (Columbia 38519; backed with "I Could Get a Man").

She was a protégé of the boxer Joe Louis who signed her to a "personal management contract" in 1952. Louis was credited for "boost[ing] [her] singing career" and was quoted to say, "She is the greatest singer since the sewing machine".

In 1955, she starred in a "revitalized edition" of the Broadway musical titled Sugar Hill.

Later, she married a surgeon named E. Gates Morgan from Akron, Ohio, and in 1959 was claimed to be the "first Negro performer on Akron TV", being a regular on the television station's five-nights-a-week variety show Akron Today.

She recorded with Herbie Mann for Atlantic Records, together with Maya Angelou being credited for vocals on his 1960 album The Common Ground.

According to AllMusic, in 1993 she was honored by the Smithsonian Museum as one of the "five surviving vocalists of the Duke Ellington Orchestra" and later recorded, as a featured soloist on a Duke Ellington medley, with the Cleveland Jazz Orchestra for their 1999 album titled Traditions.

Parker died on December 17, 2018, aged 99.
