= Standing Ovation at Newport =

Live album by Herbie Mann
- Released: 1965
- Recorded: May 24 and July 3, 1965
- Venue: The Village Gate, New York City and Newport Jazz Festival, Newport, Rhode Island
- Genre: Jazz
- Length: 34:49
- Label: Atlantic; SD 1445

Herbie Mann chronology
Latin Mann (1965)	Standing Ovation at Newport (1965)	Today! (1966)

Standing Ovation at Newport is a live album by American jazz flautist Herbie Mann recorded at the Newport Jazz Festival in 1965 (with one track from an earlier performance at The Village Gate) for the Atlantic label.

== Reception ==
Professional ratings
Review scores
Source	Rating
AllMusic	4/5 stars
The Penguin Guide to Jazz Recordings	3/4 stars

AllMusic awarded the album 4 stars with its review by Scott Yanow noting "The performance by Herbie Mann's group was one of the high points of the 1965 Newport Jazz Festival".

== Track listing ==
1. "Patato" (Dave Pike) - 8:21
2. "Stolen Moments" (Oliver Nelson) - 9:35
3. "Mushi Mushi" (Herbie Mann) - 6:02
4. "Comin' Home Baby" (Ben Tucker, Bob Dorough) - 10:51

== Personnel ==
- Herbie Mann - flute
- John Hitchcock, Mark Weinstein - trombone
- Dave Pike - vibraphone
- Chick Corea - piano
- Earl May (tracks 1–3), Ben Tucker (track 4) - bass
- Bruno Carr - drums
- Carlos "Patato" Valdes - congas
