= Don Friedman at Maybeck =

Live album by Don Friedman
- Released: 1994
- Recorded: September 5, 1993
- Venues: Maybeck Recital Hall, Berkeley, California
- Genre: Jazz
- Label: Concord

Don Friedman chronology
| Stella by Starlight (1994) | Don Friedman at Maybeck (1994) | Almost Everything (1995) |

Don Friedman at Maybeck: Maybeck Recital Hall Series Volume Thirty-Three is an album of solo performances by jazz pianist Don Friedman.

== Music and recording ==
The album was recorded at the Maybeck Recital Hall in Berkeley, California, in 1993. The material includes "Memories for Scotty", a Friedman original, written as a tribute to bassist Scott LaFaro.

== Release and reception ==
Professional ratings
Review scores
| Source | Rating |
|---|---|
| AllMusic | 4.5/5 stars |
| The Penguin Guide to Jazz | 3.5/4 stars |

The AllMusic reviewer Ken Dryden concluded: "For those unfamiliar with Don Friedman's extensive recordings under his own name, this is a great CD to start with."

== Track listing ==
1. "In Your Own Sweet Way"
2. "Alone Together"
3. "Prelude to a Kiss"
4. "I Hear a Rhapsody"
5. "Invitation"
6. "Memories for Scotty"
7. "I Concentrate on You"
8. "How Deep Is the Ocean?"
9. "Sea's Breeze"

== Personnel ==
- Don Friedman – piano
