= Herbie Mann Live at Newport =

Live album by Herbie Mann
- Released: 1963
- Recorded: July 7, 1963
- Venue: Newport Jazz Festival, Newport, Rhode Island
- Genre: Latin Jazz
- Length: 40:22
- Label: Atlantic; SD 1413
- Producer: Nesuhi Ertegun

Herbie Mann chronology
Do the Bossa Nova with Herbie Mann (1962)	Herbie Mann Live at Newport (1963)	Latin Fever (1964)

Herbie Mann Live at Newport is a live album by American jazz flautist Herbie Mann recorded at the Newport Jazz Festival in 1963 for the Atlantic label.

== Reception ==
Professional ratings
Review scores
Source	Rating
AllMusic	4/5 stars
The Penguin Guide to Jazz Recordings	3/4 stars

AllMusic awarded the album 4 stars with its review by Scott Yanow calling it a "well-played program".

== Track listing ==
1. "Soft Winds" (Benny Goodman, Fred Royal) - 7:40
2. "Desafinado" (Antônio Carlos Jobim, Newton Mendonça) - 7:39
3. "Samba de Orfeu" (Luiz Bonfá) - 6:09
4. "Don't You Know" (Ben Tucker) - 10:49
5. "Garota de Ipanema" (Jobim, Vinicius de Moraes) - 8:05

== Personnel ==
- Herbie Mann - flute
- Dave Pike - vibraphone
- Don Friedman - piano
- Attila Zoller - guitar
- Ben Tucker - bass
- Bobby Thomas - drums
- Willie Bobo, Carlos "Patato" Valdes - percussion (tracks 1, 3 & 4)
