= Right Now (Herbie Mann album) =

Studio album by Herbie Mann
- Released: 1962
- Recorded: March 12 & 28 and April 19, 1962; NYC
- Genre: Latin Jazz
- Length: 32:10
- Label: Atlantic; SD 1384
- Producer: Nesuhi Ertegun

Herbie Mann chronology
Herbie Mann Returns to the Village Gate (1961)	Right Now (1962)	Brazil, Bossa Nova & Blues (1962)

Right Now is an album by American jazz flautist Herbie Mann recorded in 1962 for the Atlantic label.

== Reception ==
Professional ratings
Review scores
Source	Rating
Allmusic	3/5 stars

Allmusic awarded the album 3 stars stating "The flutist provided a very wide variety of music during his long stay at Atlantic; this rewarding 1962 LP found him combining bop with various forms of world music".

== Track listing ==
All compositions by Herbie Mann except as indicated

1. "Right Now" - 3:11
2. "Desafinado" (Antônio Carlos Jobim, Newton Mendonça) - 4:21
3. "Challil" - 4:36
4. "Jumpin' With Symphony Sid" (Lester Young) - 2:56
5. "Borquinho" (Roberto Menescal, Renaldo Boscoli) - 3:38
6. "Cool Heat" - 5:11
7. "Manhã de Carnaval" (Luiz Bonfá) - 2:55
8. "Meditation" (Jobim, Mendonça) - 5:52
9. "Free for All" - 2:19
- recorded in New York City on March 12, 1962 (tracks 5 & 7), March 28, 1962 (track 8), and April 19, 1962 (tracks 1–4, 6 & 9)

== Personnel ==
- Herbie Mann - flute
- Hagood Hardy - vibraphone
- Billy Bean - guitar
- Don Payne (tracks 5, 7 & 8), Bill Salter (tracks 1–4, 6 & 9) - bass
- Willie Bobo - drums
- Carlos "Patato" Valdes - congas
- Johnny Pacheco (tracks 5 & 7), Willie Rodriguez (tracks 5, 7 & 8) - percussion
