= Herbie Mann Returns to the Village Gate =

Live album by Herbie Mann
- Released: 1963
- Recorded: April 26 and November 17, 1961
- Venue: The Village Gate, New York City
- Genre: Jazz
- Length: 36:28
- Label: Atlantic; SD 1407
- Producer: Nesuhi Ertegun

Herbie Mann chronology
Herbie Mann at the Village Gate (1961)	Herbie Mann Returns to the Village Gate (1963)	Right Now (1962)

Herbie Mann Returns to the Village Gate is a live album by American jazz flautist Herbie Mann recorded in 1961 for the Atlantic label but not released until 1963.

The flute theme of the song "Candle Dance" was adopted by Santana for the song "Mother Africa" on their album "Welcome" (1973).

== Reception ==
Professional ratings
Review scores
Source	Rating
AllMusic	3/5 stars
The Penguin Guide to Jazz Recordings	3/4 stars

AllMusic awarded the album 3 stars with its review by Scott Yanow stating "This release, a follow-up to his hit At the Village Gate (two songs are from the same gig while three others actually date from seven months earlier), features Mann in an ideal group ...blending in the influence of African, Afro-Cuban and even Brazilian jazz. Worth searching for".

== Track listing ==
All compositions by Herbie Mann except as indicated

1. "Bags' Groove" (Milt Jackson) - 8:34
2. "New York Is a Jungle Festival" - 9:53
3. "Candle Dance" - 5:30
4. "Bedouin" - 7:48
5. "Ekunda" - 4:43
- Recorded at the Village Gate in NYC on April 26 (tracks 3–5) and November 17 (tracks 1 & 2), 1961

== Personnel ==
- Herbie Mann - flute
- Dave Pike - vibraphone, marimba (tracks 3–5)
- Hagood Hardy - vibraphone (tracks 1 & 2)
- Ahmed Abdul-Malik (tracks 1 & 2), Knobby Totah (tracks 3–5) - bass
- Rudy Collins - drums
- Chief Bey (tracks 1 & 2), Ray Mantilla, Ray Barretto (tracks 3–5) - percussion
