= Brazil, Bossa Nova & Blues =

Studio album by Herbie Mann
- Released: 1962
- Recorded: 1962; NYC
- Genre: Latin Jazz, Bossa Nova
- Label: United Artists; UAJ 14009
- Producer: Alan Douglas

Herbie Mann chronology
Right Now (1962)	Brazil, Bossa Nova & Blues (1962)	Nirvana (1962)

Brazil, Bossa Nova & Blues (also released as Brazil Blues and Jazz Impressions of Brazil) is an album by American jazz flautist Herbie Mann recorded in 1962 for the United Artists label.

== Reception ==
Professional ratings
Review scores
Source	Rating
Allmusic	4/5 stars

Allmusic awarded the album 4 stars stating "A slightly expanded version of flutist Herbie Mann's 1961-62 group performs African-, Cuban- and Brazilian-influenced jazz on this appealing LP".

== Track listing ==
All compositions by Herbie Mann except as indicated

1. "Brazil" (Ary Barroso) - 4:40
2. "Copacabana" - 6:55
3. "Minha Saudade" (João Gilberto, João Donato) - 5:12
4. "B. N. Blues" - 2:50
5. "One Note Samba" (Antônio Carlos Jobim, Newton Mendonça) - 4:26
6. "Me Faz Recordar" (Bill Salter) - 7:55

== Personnel ==
- Herbie Mann - flute
- Hagood Hardy - vibraphone
- Billy Bean - guitar
- Bill Salter - bass
- Willie Bobo - drums
- Carlos "Patato" Valdes - congas
- Carmen Costa - maracas
- José de Paula - tambourine
