= Herbie Mann at the Village Gate =

Live album by Herbie Mann
- Released: 1961
- Recorded: November 17, 1961
- Venue: The Village Gate, New York City
- Genre: Jazz
- Label: Atlantic
- Producer: Nesuhi Ertegun

Herbie Mann chronology
| The Family of Mann (1961) | Herbie Mann at the Village Gate (1961) | Herbie Mann Returns to the Village Gate (1961) |

Herbie Mann at the Village Gate is a 1961 live album by jazz flutist Herbie Mann which was his third album for Atlantic Records, the main label for much of his career. The album was recorded at legendary club The Village Gate.

Professional ratings
Review scores
| Source | Rating |
|---|---|
| Down Beat | 2.5/5 stars |
| The Rolling Stone Jazz Record Guide | 4/5 stars |
| AllMusic | 4.5/5 stars |
| The Penguin Guide to Jazz Recordings | 3.5/4 stars |

== Reception ==
AllMusic awarded the album 4½ stars with its review stating "At the Village Gate is the album that first brought Herbie Mann to widespread popular attention, thanks to the inclusion of "Comin' Home Baby," which soon became one of the flautist's signature songs. By the time of the record's release in 1962, however, Mann had already been a bandleader for years, honing his pioneering blend of Afro-Cuban and Brazilian music with hard bop's funky structures just under the public radar. As a result, At the Village Gate sounds more like a summation than a beginning".

== Track listing ==
=== Side One ===
1. "Comin' Home, Baby" (Ben Tucker) (8:37)
2. "Summertime" (DuBose Heyward, Ira Gershwin, and George Gershwin) (10:18)

=== Side Two ===
1. "It Ain't Necessarily So" (George and Ira Gershwin) (19:55)

== Personnel ==
- Herbie Mann - flute
- Hagood Hardy - vibraharp
- Ahmed Abdul-Malik - bass
- Rudy Collins - drums
- Ray Mantilla - conga and percussion
- Chief Bey - African drum and percussion
- Ben Tucker - additional bass (and solo) on "Comin' Home, Baby"
- Willis Conover - liner notes

== Charting ==
The album peaked at 30 on The Billboard 200.
