= Do the Bossa Nova with Herbie Mann =

Studio album by Herbie Mann
- Released: 1963
- Recorded: October 15–17 & 19, 1962; Rio de Janeiro, Brazil
- Genre: Latin jazz, bossa nova
- Label: Atlantic; SD 1397
- Producer: Nesuhi Ertegun

Herbie Mann chronology
Nirvana (1962)	Do the Bossa Nova with Herbie Mann (1963)	Herbie Mann Live at Newport (1963)

Do the Bossa Nova with Herbie Mann (subtitled Recorded in Rio de Janeiro with the Greatest Bossa Nova Players) is an album by American jazz flautist Herbie Mann recorded in 1962 for the Atlantic label. All of the tracks are instrumentals, except for "One Note Samba" which is sung by its composer, Antonio Carlos Jobim.

== Reception ==
Professional ratings
Review scores
Source	Rating
AllMusic	4/5 stars

AllMusic awarded the album 4 stars with its review by Scott Yanow stating "Rather than play a watered-down version of bossa nova in New York studios (which was becoming quite common as the bossa nova fad hit its peak in 1962), flutist Herbie Mann went down to Brazil and recorded with some of the top players of the style. ...the music is as much Brazilian as it is jazz. This 'fusion' works quite well".

== Track listing ==
1. "Deve Ser Amor (It Must Be Love)" (Vinícius de Moraes, Baden Powell) – 4:19
2. "Menina Feia (Ugly Girl)" (Oscar Castro-Neves) – 5:30
3. "Amor Em Paz (Love in Peace)" (Antônio Carlos Jobim, de Moraes) – 2:36
4. "Voce e Eu" (Carlos Lyra, de Moraes) – 4:21
5. "One Note Samba" (Antônio Carlos Jobim, Newton Mendonça) – 3:30
6. "The Blues Walk" (Clifford Brown) – 4:06
7. "Consolação (Consolation)" (Powell, de Moraes) – 4:26
8. "Bossa Velha (Old Bossa)" (Herbie Mann) – 4:23

== Personnel ==
- Herbie Mann – flute
- Durval Ferreira (tracks 2 & 6), Baden Powell (tracks 1 & 7) – guitar
- Pedro Paulo – trumpet (tracks 2 & 6)
- Paulo Moura – alto saxophone (tracks 2 & 6)
- Antônio Carlos Jobim – piano, vocals, arranger (tracks 3 & 5)
- Luis Carlos Vinhas (track 4), Sergio Mendes (tracks 2 & 6) – piano
- Gabriel (tracks 1 & 7), Papao (track 1), Otavio Bailly Jr. (tracks 2 & 6) – bass
- Juquinha (track 7), Dom Um Romão (tracks 2 & 6), – drums
- Zezinho e Sua Escola de Samba – percussion (track 8)
- Other unidentified musicians
