= Dave Pike =

American jazz vibraphone and marimba player (1938–2015)

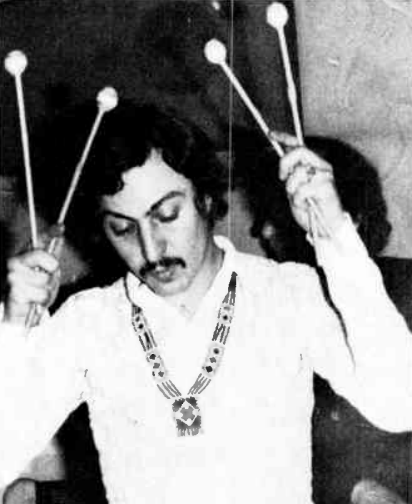
- Pike in a 1970 DownBeat advertisement

Background information
- Born: David Samuel Pike; March 23, 1938; Detroit, Michigan, U.S.
- Died: October 3, 2015 (aged 77) Del Mar, California, U.S.
- Genres: Brazilian jazz, Latin jazz, world
- Occupation(s): Musician, songwriter
- Instrument(s): Vibraphone, marimba
- Labels: Timeless, Criss Cross, Atlantic, MPS

David Samuel Pike (March 23, 1938 – October 3, 2015) was an American jazz vibraphone and marimba player. He appeared on many albums by Nick Brignola, Paul Bley and Kenny Clarke, Bill Evans, and Herbie Mann. He also recorded extensively as leader, including a number of albums on MPS Records.

== Biography ==
Pike learned drums at the age of eight and was self-taught on vibraphone. He made his recording debut with the Paul Bley Quartet in 1958. He began putting an amplifier on his vibes, when working with flautist Herbie Mann in the early 1960s. By the late 1960s, Pike's music had become more exploratory, contributing a unique voice and new contexts that pushed the envelope in times remembered for their exploratory nature. The Doors of Perception, recorded in 1966 (released in 1970 for the Atlantic Records subsidiary Vortex Records) and produced by former boss Herbie Mann, explored ballads, modal territory, musique concrète, with free and lyrical improvisation, and featured musicians including alto saxophonist Lee Konitz, bassist Chuck Israels and pianist Don Friedman.

Pike moved to Europe and signed with MPS Records. With the collaboration of Volker Kriegel (guitar), J. A. Rettenbacher (acoustic and electric bass), and Peter Baumeister (drums), he formed the Dave Pike Set. The group recorded six records from 1969 to 1972 that ran the gamut from funky grooves to free, textural territory. Though short-lived, the group created a unique identity and textural palette. Kriegel's compositional and instrumental (playing acoustic, classical and electric guitar as well as sitar) contributions to the group helped set the Dave Pike Set's sound apart, organically incorporating influences from jazz, soul jazz, psychedelia, avant-garde music and world music.

Dave Pike died in Del Mar, California of emphysema, aged 77.

== Discography ==
=== As leader ===
- The Jazz Couriers, Gene Norman Presents the Jazz Couriers (Whippet, 1957)
- It's Time for Dave Pike (Riverside, 1961)
- Pike's Peak (Epic, 1962) – rec. 1961
- Bossa Nova Carnival (New Jazz, 1962)
- Limbo Carnival (New Jazz, 1962)
- Dave Pike Plays the Jazz Version of Oliver! (Moodsville, 1963) – rec. 1962
- Manhattan Latin (Decca, 1964)
- Jazz for the Jet Set (Atlantic, 1966) – rec. 1965
- Got the Feelin (Relax, 1969)
- Four Reasons (MPS, 1969)
- Noisy Silence/Gentle Noise (MPS, 1969)
- Live at the Philharmonie (MPS, 1970)
- Infra-Red (MPS, 1970)
- The Doors of Perception (Vortex, 1970) – live rec. 1966
- Album (MPS/BASF, 1971)
- Salomao (MPS/BASF, 1972)
- Times Out of Mind (Muse, 1976)
- On a Gentle Note (Muse, 1978)
- Let the Minstrels Play On (Muse, 1980)
- Moon Bird (Muse, 1983)
- Pike's Groove (Criss Cross, 1986)
- Bluebird (Timeless, 1989)
- Bophead (Ubiquity, 1998)
- Peligroso (CuBop, 2000)
- At Studio 2 (B.Free, 2016)

=== As sideman ===
With Herbie Mann

- Brazil, Bossa Nova & Blues (United Artists, 1962)
- Herbie Mann Returns to the Village Gate (Atlantic, 1963)
- Herbie Mann Live at Newport (Atlantic, 1963) – live
- My Kinda Groove (Atlantic, 1965) – rec. 1964
- Latin Mann (Columbia, 1965)
- Standing Ovation at Newport (Atlantic, 1965) – live
- The Roar of the Greasepaint the Smell of the Crowd (Atlantic, 1965)
- Monday Night at the Village Gate (Atlantic, 1966) – rec. 1965
- Today! (Atlantic, 1966) – rec. 1965
- The Evolution of Mann (Atlantic, 1972)[2LP] – compilations

With others

- Paul Bley, Solemn Meditation (GNP, 1957)
- Nick Brignola, All Business (Reservoir, 1999)
- Kenny Clarke/Francy Boland Big Band, All Smiles (MPS, 1968)
- Slide Hampton, Mellow-dy (LRC, 1992)
- Babatunde Olatunji, High Life! (Columbia, 1963)
- Clark Terry, At the Montreux Jazz Festival (Polydor, 1970)
