= Herbie Mann discography =

Jazz musician discography

This is a Herbie Mann discography. Mann spent his early years recording for a number of jazz oriented record labels, and signed with Atlantic Records in 1961. He recorded with them through the 1960s and 1970s, including their subsidiary Cotillion Records, where he ran his own imprint, Embryo Records, in the 1970s, for his records as well as other musicians. Mann also ran two independent record labels, Herbie Mann Music in the 1980s, and during the 1990s, Kokopelli Records. Minor reissues are not noted.

== Discography ==
=== As leader/co-leader ===
- 1954: East Coast Jazz Series No.4 (Bethlehem, 1955) [7" EP] – also released as Herbie Mann (Bethlehem, 1955) [10" LP]
- 1955: Flamingo (Bethlehem, 1955)
- 1955: The Herbie Mann-Sam Most Quintet with Sam Most (Bethlehem, 1956)
- 1954-56: Herbie Mann Plays (Bethlehem, 1956) – this is a reissue of Herbie Mann (1955) with 4 tracks added on.
- 1956: Love and the Weather (Bethlehem, 1956)
- 1956: Mann in the Morning (Prestige, 1958) – also released as Herbie Mann in Sweden
- 1956: Herbie Mann with the Wessel Ilcken Trio (Epic, 1958) – also released as Salute to the Flute
- 1957: Flute Flight with Bobby Jaspar (Prestige, 1957)
- 1957: Flute Soufflé with Bobby Jaspar (Prestige, 1957)
- 1957: Sultry Serenade (Riverside, 1957)
- 1957: Salute to the Flute (Epic, 1957)
- 1957: The Jazz We Heard Last Summer (Savoy, 1957) - split album shared with Sahib Shihab
- 1957: Mann Alone (Savoy, 1957)
- 1957: Yardbird Suite (Savoy, 1957)
- 1957: Great Ideas of Western Mann (Riverside, 1957)
- 1957: Flute Fraternity with Buddy Collette (Mode, 1957)
- 1957: The Magic Flute of Herbie Mann (Verve, 1957)
- 1958: Just Wailin' with Charlie Rouse, Kenny Burrell, Mal Waldron (New Jazz, 1958)
- 1959: Herbie Mann's African Suite (United Artists, 1959) – also released as St. Thomas
- 1959: Flautista! (Verve, 1960)
- 1960: Flute, Brass, Vibes and Percussion (Verve, 1961)
- 1960: The Common Ground (Atlantic, 1960)
- 1960: This Is My Beloved with Laurence Harvey (Atlantic, 1962) – Walter Benton's poem This Is My Beloved
- 1961: The Family of Mann (Atlantic, 1961)
- 1961: Herbie Mann at the Village Gate (Atlantic, 1961) – live
- 1961: Herbie Mann Returns to the Village Gate (Atlantic, 1963) – live
- 1961–62: Nirvana with Bill Evans (Atlantic, 1964)
- 1962: Right Now (Atlantic, 1962)
- 1962: Brazil, Bossa Nova & Blues (United Artists, 1962) – also released as Brazil Blues
- 1962: Do the Bossa Nova with Herbie Mann (Atlantic, 1963)
- 1963: Herbie Mann Live at Newport (Atlantic, 1963) – live
- 1962–64: Latin Fever (Atlantic, 1964)
- 1964: My Kinda Groove (Atlantic, 1965)
- 1965: Herbie Mann Plays The Roar of the Greasepaint – The Smell of the Crowd (Atlantic, 1965)
- 1965: Standing Ovation at Newport (Atlantic, 1965)
- 1965: Latin Mann (Columbia, 1965) – also released as Big Boss Mann
- 1965: Monday Night at the Village Gate (Atlantic, 1966)
- 1965: Today! (Atlantic, 1966)
- 1960–66: Our Mann Flute (Atlantic, 1966)
- 1966: New Mann at Newport (Atlantic, 1967)
- 1966: Impressions of the Middle East (Atlantic, 1967)
- 1966: A Mann & A Woman with Tamiko Jones (Atlantic, 1967)
- 1964–67: The Beat Goes On (Atlantic, 1967)
- 1966–67: The Herbie Mann String Album (Atlantic, 1967)
- 1967: Glory of Love (A&M/CTI, 1968)
- 1967: The Wailing Dervishes (Atlantic, 1968)
- 1968: Windows Opened (Atlantic, 1968)
- 1968: The Inspiration I Feel (Atlantic, 1968)
- 1969: Memphis Underground (Atlantic, 1969)
- 1968: Concerto Grosso in D Blues (Atlantic, 1969)
- 1969: Live at the Whisky a Go Go (Atlantic, 1969) – live
- 1969: Live at the Whisky 1969: The Unreleased Masters (Real Gone Music, 2016) [2CD] – live
- 1969: Stone Flute (Embryo, 1970)
- 1969: Muscle Shoals Nitty Gritty (Embryo, 1970)
- 1970: Memphis Two-Step (Embryo, 1971)
- 1971: Push Push (Embryo, 1971)
- 1972: Mississippi Gambler (Atlantic, 1972)
- 1972: Hold On, I'm Comin' (Atlantic, 1973) – live
- 1971–73: Turtle Bay (Atlantic, 1973)
- 1973: Reggae (Atlantic, 1973)
- 1973: First Light (Atlantic, 1974) – as by 'The Family of Mann'
- 1973: London Underground (Atlantic, 1974)
- 1973: Reggae II (Atlantic, 1976)
- 1974: Gagaku & Beyond (Finnadar/Atlantic, 1976)
- 1975: Discothèque (Atlantic, 1975)
- 1975: Waterbed (Atlantic, 1975)
- 1973–76: Surprises (Atlantic, 1976)
- 1976: Bird in a Silver Cage (Atlantic, 1976)
- 1977?: Herbie Mann & Fire Island (Atlantic, 1977)
- 1977: Brazil: Once Again (Atlantic, 1978)
- 1978: Super Mann (Atlantic, 1978)
- 1978?: Yellow Fever (Atlantic, 1979)
- 1979: Sunbelt (Atlantic, 1979)
- 1980: All Blues/Forest Rain (Herbie Mann Music, 1981) – live
- 1981?: Mellow (Atlantic, 1981)
- 1983?: Astral Island (Atlantic, 1983)
- 1985?: See Through Spirits (Atlantic, 1985)
- 1987?: Jasil Brazz (RBI, 1987)
- 1989?: Opalescence (Gaia, 1989) – reissued from Kokopelli
- 1990?: Caminho De Casa (Chesky, 1990)
- 1992: Deep Pocket (Kokopelli, 1994)
- 1995?: Peace Pieces: The Music of Bill Evans (Kokopelli, 1995) – reissued from Lightyear
- 1995: 65th Birthday Celebration: Live at the Blue Note in New York City (Lightyear, 1997) – live
- 1997?: America/Brasil (Lightyear, 1997)
- 1998?: African Mann: Herbie Mann Live in Africa (Giraffe Music, 1998) – live
- 2000?: Eastern European Roots with Sona Terra (Lightyear, 2000)
- 2003: Beyond Brooklyn with Phil Woods (MCG Jazz, 2004)

=== Compilations ===
- The Epitome of Jazz (Bethlehem, 1962)
- Sound of Mann (Verve, 1963)
- The Best of Herbie Mann (Prestige, 1965)
- The Best of Herbie Mann (Atlantic, 1970)
- The Evolution of Mann (Atlantic, 1972)[2LP]
- Swinging Shepherd Blues (Midi, 1972)
- Let Me Tell You (Milestone, 1973)[2LP]
- Early Mann: The Bethlehem Years, Volume 1 (Bethlehem, 1975)
- Early Mann: The Bethlehem Years, Volume 2 (Bethlehem, 1976)
- The Evolution of Mann: The Herbie Mann Anthology (Rhino1994)[2CD] – Atlantic material
- Samba & Bossa Nova: Copacabana (Saludos Amigos [UK], 1994)
- Jazz Masters #56: Herbie Mann (Verve, 1996)
- The Best of the Atlantic Years (Collectables, 2002)[14CD]
- Introducing Herbie Mann (Warner Jazz/Rhino [UK], 2006)
- Herbie Mann: Original Album Series (Rhino [UPC: 081227977115], 2011)[5CD] – reissues Herbie Mann At The Village Gate, Do The Bossa Nova With Herbie Mann, Nirvana (with Bill Evans' Trio), Muscle Shoals Nitty Gritty, and the live Hold On, I'm Comin' .
- It's a Funky Thing: The Very Best of Herbie Mann (Varèse Sarabande, 2017) – Atlantic material originally edited and released as singles.

=== As sideman ===
With Chet Baker

- Chet Baker Introduces Johnny Pace (Riverside, 1958) - with Johnny Pace
- Chet (Riverside, 1958)
- Chet Baker Plays the Best of Lerner and Loewe (Riverside, 1959)

With Mat Mathews and The New York Quartet

- Accordion Solos (Brunswick, 1956)– recorded 1953-1954
- By Special Request (Decca, 1956)
- Gentle Art Of Love (Dawn, 1956)
- The Modern Art Of Jazz (Dawn, 1956)
- New York Jazz Quartet (Elektra, 1957)
- New York Jazz Quartet Goes Native (Elektra, 1957)
- Music For Suburban Living (Coral, 1958)

With Michel Legrand

- Legrand Jazz (Columbia 1959)
- Scarlet Ribbons (Columbia 1959)

With Pete Rugolo

- Rugolomania (Columbia, 1955)
- New Sounds by Pete Rugolo (Harmony, 1957) – rec. 1954–55

With others

- Air, Air (Embryo, 1971)
- The Atlantic Family, The Atlantic Family Live at Montreux (Atlantic, 1977)
- Count Basie, String Along with Basie (Roulette, 1960)
- Art Blakey, Orgy in Rhythm (Blue Note, 1957)
- Sarah Vaughan & Clifford Brown, Sarah Vaughan with Clifford Brown (EmArcy, 1954)
- Ralph Burns and Leonard Feather, Winter Sequence (MGM, 1954)
- Hank Jones, Bluebird (Savoy, 1955)
- Philly Joe Jones, Drums Around the World (Riverside, 1959)
- Machito and His Afro Cuban Jazz Ensemble, Machito with Flute to Boot (Roulette, 1959)
- Mundell Lowe, TV Action Jazz! (RCA Camden, 1959)
- Howard McGhee, Life Is Just a Bowl of Cherries (Bethlehem, 1956)
- Carmen McRae, Carmen McRae (Bethlehem, 1955)
- Jay McShann, The Big Apple Bash (Atlantic, 1979)
- Paul Quinichette, Moods (EmArcy, 1954)
- A. K. Salim, Flute Suite (Savoy, 1957) - with Frank Wess
- Billy Taylor, Billy Taylor with Four Flutes (Riverside, 1959)
- Joe Wilder, The Pretty Sound (Columbia, 1959)
