= Roy Ayers discography =

- Studio albums: 33
- EPs: 1
- Soundtrack albums: 1
- Compilation albums: 26
- Video albums: 1

This is the discography of American vibraphonist and record producer Roy Ayers.

== Studio albums ==
List of albums with selected chart positions
Title	Album details	Peak chart positions			
Title	Album details	US	US R&B	US Jazz	UK
West Coast Vibes	Released: 1963; Label: United Artists	—	—	—	—
Virgo Vibes	Released: 1967; Label: Atlantic	—	—	—	—
Stoned Soul Picnic	Released: 1968; Label: Atlantic	—	—	—	—
Daddy Bug	Released: 1969; Label: Atlantic	—	—	—	—
Ubiquity	Released: 1970; Label: Polydor	—	—	—	—
Let's Do It	Released: 1978; Label: Polydor	33	15	—	—
You Send Me	Released: 1978; Label: Polydor	48	16	—	—
Fever	Released: 1979; Label: Polydor	67	25	—	—
No Stranger to Love	Released: 1979; Label: Polydor	82	22	—	—
Love Fantasy	Released: 1980; Label: Polydor	157	47	—	—
Africa, Center of the World	Released: 1981; Label: Polydor	197	43	—	—
Feeling Good	Released: 1982; Label: Polydor	160	45	—	—
Silver Vibrations (Note: "Silver Vibrations" and "Drivin' On Up" were recorded at the same session and released separately in 1983 via Uno Melodic Records. "Lots of Love" was also released in 1983 via Uno Melodic, and consist of three songs from "Silver Vibrations" and all songs from "Drivin' On Up" located in different sequences. In 1988, "Lots of Love" was re-released via Ichiban Records titled as "Drive". In 2005, "Lots of Love" was reissued under the title "My Vibes" by Snapper Music along with eight unreleased cuts Ayers recorded in 1999.)	Released: 1983; Label: Uno Melodic Records	—	—	—	—
Drivin' On Up	Released: 1983; Label: Uno Melodic Records	—	—	—	—
In the Dark	Released: 1984; Label: Columbia	—	50	—	—
You Might Be Surprised	Released: 1985; Label: Columbia	—	31	—	91
I'm the One (For Your Love Tonight)	Released: 1987; Label: Columbia	—	—	—	—
Wake Up	Released: 1989; Label: Ichiban	—	60	—	—
Nasté	Released: 1995; Label: Groovetown, RCA	—	71	18	—
Perfection	Released: 2000; Label: AFI	—	—	—	—
"—" denotes a recording that did not chart or was not released in that territory.

=== Roy Ayers Ubiquity ===
List of albums with selected chart positions
Title	Album details	Peak chart positions	
Title	Album details	US	US R&B
He's Coming	Released: 1972; Label: Polydor	—	—
Red, Black & Green	Released: 1973; Label: Polydor	—	—
Virgo Red	Released: 1973; Label: Polydor	—	—
Change Up the Groove	Released: 1974; Label: Polydor	156	—
A Tear to a Smile	Released: 1975; Label: Polydor	—	—
Mystic Voyage	Released: 1975; Label: Polydor	90	13
Everybody Loves the Sunshine	Released: 1976; Label: Polydor	51	10
Vibrations	Released: 1976; Label: Polydor	74	11
Lifeline	Released: 1977; Label: Polydor	72	9
Starbooty	Released: 1978; Label: Elektra	146	—
"—" denotes a recording that did not chart or was not released in that territory.

=== Soundtrack albums ===
Title	Album details
Coffy (Note: Also a studio album.)	Released: 1973; Label: Polydor

== Live albums ==
Title	Album details
Live at the Montreux Jazz Festival	Released: 1972; Label: Polydor
Fast Money (Note: "Fast Money" was re-released via Castle Music titled "Live at Ronnie Scott's" in 2001. In 2002, Sanctuary Visual Entertainment re-released "Live at Ronnie Scott's" as a video album titled "Live at Ronnie Scott's - London 1988".)	Released: 1990; Label: Essential
Searchin'	Released: 1991; Label: Ronnie Scott's Jazz House
Hot	Released: 1992; Label: Ronnie Scott's Jazz House
Good Vibrations	Released: 1993; Label: Ronnie Scott's Jazz House
Live from West Port Jazzfestival Hamburg (with Ray Gaskins Band and Jocelyn Brown)	Released: 1999; Label: Henry Records

== Compilations, bootlegs, remix and demo albums ==
Title	Album details
Daddy Bug & Friends	Released: 1976; Label: Atlantic
The Best of Roy Ayers	Released: 1979; Label: Polydor (UK)
Lots of Love Drive My Vibes	Released: 1983, 1988, 2005; Label: Uno Melodic; Ichiban; Snapper
Double Trouble (with Rick James)	Released: 1992; Label: Uno Melodic
Good Vibrations	Released: 1993; Label: Ronnie Scott's Jazz House
Vibrant	Released: 1993; Label: Connoisseur Collection
A Shining Symbol: The Ultimate Collection	Released: 1993; Label: Polydor (UK)
King of Vibes (Roy Ayers Super Collection)	Released: 1993; Label: Polydor (JP)
Evolution – The Polydor Anthology (2-CD)	Released: 1995; Label: Chronicles/Polydor
Vibesman (Live at Ronnie Scott's)	Released: 1995; Label: Music Club
Searchin' (Live) / Hot	Released: 1996; Label: Ronnie Scott's Jazz House
Good Vibrations / The Essential Groove (Live)	Released: 1996; Label: Ronnie Scott's Jazz House
The Best of Roy Ayers (1972-1981)	Released: 1997; Label: Polydor
In the Dark / You Might Be Surprised	Released: 1998; Label: Columbia
The Collection	Released: 1998; Label: Connoisseur Collection
Juice	Released: 1999; Label: Charly
Smooth Jazz	Released: 1999; Label: AFI
Daddy Bug / Virgo Vibes	Released: 1999; Label: Collectables
The Best of Roy Ayers: 20th Century Masters/The Millennium Collection	Released: 2000; Label: Polydor
Essential Vibes	Released: 2002; Label: Metro
For Café Après-Midi	Released: 2002; Label: Universal
Destination Motherland: The Roy Ayers Anthology (2-CD)	Released: 2003; Label: Universal/Polydor
Snoop	Released: 2003; Label: AFI, Chrysalis Music
Virgin Ubiquity (Unreleased Recordings 1976-1981)	Released: 2003; Label: Rapster
Mahogany Vibe	Released: 2004; Label: Rapster
Virgin Ubiquity II (Unreleased Recordings 1976-1981)	Released: 2005; Label: Rapster
Virgin Ubiquity Remixed	Released: 2006; Label: Rapster
Step in to Our Life / Prime Time (with Wayne Henderson)	Released: 2011; Label: Cherry Red
Searching for Sunshine (1973-1980)	Released: 2015; Label: Raven
Roy Ayers Ubiquity: 5 Classic Albums (3-CD)	Released: 2024; Label: Robinsongs

== Singles ==
Year	Single	Peak chart positions		
Year	Single	US R&B	US Dance	UK
1976	"The Golden Rod"	70	―	―
1976	"Mystic Voyage"	70	―	―
1977	"Running Away"	19	14	―
1978	"Freaky Deaky"	29	―	―
1978	"Get On Up, Get On Down"	56	―	41
1978	"Heat of the Beat" (with Wayne Henderson)	59	―	43
1979	"Love Will Bring Us Back Together"	41	―	―
1979	"What You Won't Do for Love"	73	―	―
1979	"Don't Stop the Feeling"	32	35	56
1984	"In the Dark"	35	45	83
1984	"Poo Poo La La"	89	—	―
1985	"Slip 'N' Slide"	49	—	―
1985	"Programmed for Love"	62	—	―
1985	"Hot"	20	12	―
1987	"Can't You See Me"	―	―	96
1987	"Let's Start Love Over" (with Miles Jaye)	5	―	77
1998	"Expansions" (with Scott Grooves)	―	―	68
"—" denotes releases that did not chart or were not released in that territory.

== As sideman ==
With Curtis Amy

- Way Down (Pacific Jazz, 1962)
- Tippin' on Through (Pacific Jazz, 1962)
- Katanga! (Pacific Jazz, 1998)

With Herbie Mann

- A Mann & a Woman (Atlantic, 1966)
- The Wailing Dervishes (Atlantic, 1967)
- The Beat Goes On (Atlantic, 1967)
- Impressions of the Middle East (Atlantic, 1967)
- Glory of Love (A&M, 1967)
- Windows Opened (Atlantic, 1968)
- Concerto Grosso in D Blues (Atlantic, 1969)
- Live at the Whisky a Go Go (Atlantic, 1969)
- Memphis Underground (Atlantic, 1969)
- Stone Flute (Embryo, 1970)
- Muscle Shoals Nitty Gritty (Embryo, 1970)
- Memphis Two-Step (Embryo, 1971)
- The Evolution of Mann (Atlantic, 1972)
- Sunbelt (Atlantic, 1978)
- Deep Pocket (Kokopelli, 1992)

With Jack Wilson

- The Jack Wilson Quartet (Atlantic, 1963)
- Plays Brazilian Mancini (Vault, 1965)
- Ramblin' (Vault, 1966)
- Something Personal (Blue Note, 1967)
- Call Me: Jazz from the Penthouse (Century, 2018)

With others

- 4Hero, Creating Patterns (Talkin' Loud, 2001)
- Amerie, Touch (Columbia/Sony, 2005)
- Erykah Badu, Mama's Gun (Motown, 2000)
- Christophe Beck, Ant-Man (Hollywood, 2015)
- Eric Benet, A Day in the Life (Warner Bros., 1999)
- Mary J. Blige, Share My World (MCA, 1997)
- Zachary Breaux, Groovin (NYC 1992)
- Brooklyn Funk Essentials, Stay Good (Dorado, 2019)
- Jean Carn, Trust Me (Motown, 1982)
- Coolio, It Takes a Thief (Tommy Boy 1994)
- Cookie Crew, Fade to Black (1991)
- Digable Planets, Blowout (EMI, 1994)
- Doldinger, Doldinger in New York (WEA, 1994)
- Will Downing, After Tonight (Peak, 2007)
- Ronnie Foster, Love Satellite (CBS, 1978)
- Funkdoobiest, Brothas Doobie (Music On Vinyl, 2016)
- Stu Gardner, Music from the Bill Cosby Show Vol II (Columbia, 1987)
- Ghostface Killah, Apollo Kids (Def Jam, 2010)
- Wolfgang Haffner, Urban Life (Skip, 2001)
- Whitney Houston, Whitney (Arista, 1987)
- Rick James, Throwin' Down (Gordy, 1982)
- Mark James, Mark James (Bell, 1973)
- Miles Jaye, Miles (Island, 1987)
- Miles Jaye, Let's Start Over (4th & Broadway, 1987)
- Jazz Crusaders, Happy Again (Sin-Drome, 1995)
- Jazz Crusaders, Soul Axess (True Life, 2004)
- DJ Jazzy Jeff & The Fresh Prince, Code Red (Jive, 1993)
- Jellybean, Spillin' the Beans (Atlantic, 1991)
- Jeru the Damaja, The Sun Rises in the East (Payday, 1994)
- Ronny Jordan, A Brighter Day (Blue Note, 2000)
- Alicia Keys, Here (RCA, 2016)
- Fela Kuti & Roy Ayers, Music of Many Colours (Phonodisk, 1980)
- Talib Kweli, Eardrum (Warner Bros., 2007)
- Gerald Levert, The G Spot (Elektra, 2002)
- David Linx, Hungry Voices (Miracle, 1989)
- Marley Marl, Re-Entry (BBE 2001)
- James Moody, Moody's Party Live at the Blue Note (Telarc, 1995)
- Mos Def, Black On Both Sides (Rawkus1999)
- Najee, Embrace (N-Coded, 2003)
- David "Fathead" Newman, Lonely Avenue (Atlantic, 1972)
- David "Fathead" Newman, Newmanism (Atlantic, 1974)
- Vi Redd, Birdcall (United Artists, 1962)
- Pete Rock & C.L. Smooth, The Main Ingredient (Traffic 2011)
- Jill Scott, Who Is Jill Scott? (Hidden Beach 2000)
- Sandra St. Victor, Gemini: Both Sides (Expansion, 2001)
- Joseph Tawadros, Chameleons of the White Shadow (ABC Music, 2013)
- James Taylor Quartet, Room at the Top (Sanctuary, 2002)
- Tony Touch, The Piece Maker 2 (Koch, 2004)
- A Tribe Called Quest, People's Instinctive Travels and the Paths of Rhythm (Sony, 2015)
- Tyler, the Creator, Cherry Bomb (Odd Future, 2015)
- Leroy Vinnegar, Leroy Walks Again!! (Contemporary, 1963)
- Buster Williams, Crystal Reflections (Muse, 1976)
- Vanessa Williams, The Sweetest Days (Mercury, 1994)
- Gerald Wilson, On Stage (Pacific Jazz, 1965)
- Gerald Wilson, The Golden Sword (Pacific Jazz, 1966)
- Jody Watley, I Love to Love (MAW, 2000)
- Jody Watley, Midnight Lounge (Shanachie, 2003)
- Jazz Crusaders, Soul Axess, (True Life Jazz, 2004)
- 3D, Soulride, (215 Records, 2004)
- Cafe Soul All Stars, Love Pages, (You Entertainment, 2005)
- Postmodern Jazz, Love Not Truth, (Postmodern Jazz, 2005)
- Down to the Bone, Supercharged, (Narada Jazz, 2007)
- Souleymane Diamanka, L’Hiver Peul, (Universal, 2007)
- Talib Kweli, Eardrum, (Warner Bros., 2007)
- Will Downing, After Tonight, (Peak Records, 2007)
- Down to the Bone, Future Boogie, (Shanachie, 2009)
- Ray Gaskins, A Night in the Life, (Expansion, 2009)
- Cro-Magnon, 4U, (Lastrum, 2009)
- Tyler, the Creator, Cherry Bomb (Odd Future, 2015)
- Alicia Keys, Here (RCA, 2015)
- Kobi Arad, Superflow (Greenpath Musical Productions, 2015)
