= Groove (music) =

Music term

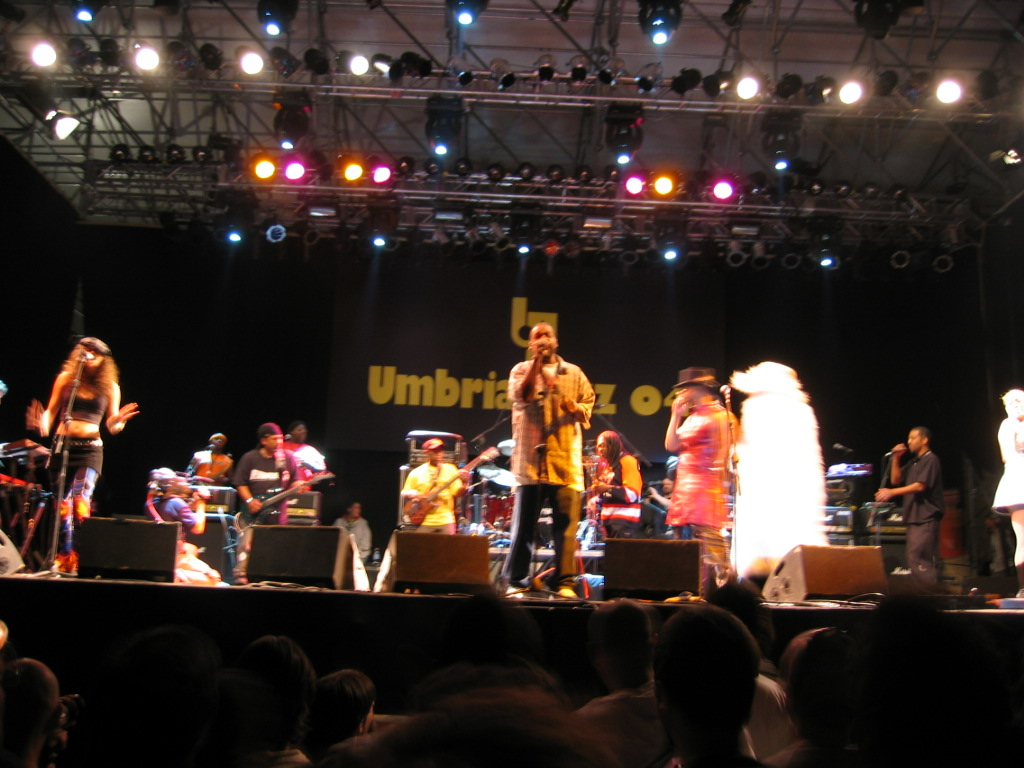
Funk music, as performed by groups such as Parliament-Funkadelic, uses catchy electric basslines and drum patterns to create a propulsive, emphatic rhythmic "feel" that is often referred to as a "groove".

In music, groove is the sense of an effect ("feel") of changing pattern in a propulsive rhythm or sense of "swing". In jazz, it can be felt as a quality of persistently repeated rhythmic units, created by the interaction of the music played by a band's rhythm section (e.g. drums, electric bass or double bass, guitar, and keyboards). Groove is a significant feature of popular music, and can be found in many genres, including salsa, rock, soul, funk, and fusion.

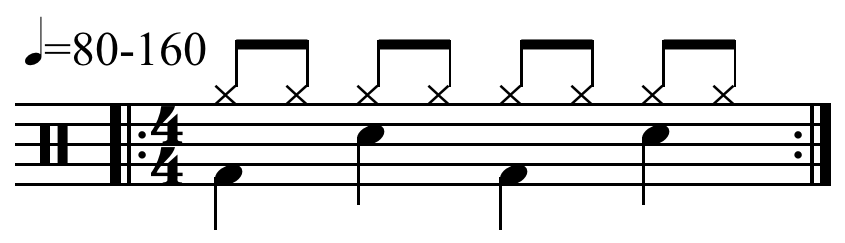
Characteristic rock groove: "bass drum on beats 1 and 3 and snare drum on beats 2 and 4 of the measure ... add eighth notes on the hi-hat"

From a broader ethnomusicological perspective, groove has been described as "an unspecifiable but ordered sense of something that is sustained in a distinctive, regular and attractive way, working to draw the listener in." Musicologists and other scholars have analyzed the concept of "groove" since around the 1990s. They have argued that a "groove" is an "understanding of rhythmic patterning" or "feel" and "an intuitive sense" of "a cycle in motion" that emerges from "carefully aligned concurrent rhythmic patterns" that stimulates dancing or foot-tapping on the part of listeners. The concept can be linked to the sorts of ostinatos that generally accompany fusions and dance musics of African derivation (e.g. African-American, Afro-Cuban, Afro-Brazilian, etc.).

The term is often applied to musical performances that make one want to move or dance, and enjoyably "groove" (a word that also has sexual connotations). The expression "in the groove" (as in the jazz standard) was widely used from around 1936 to 1945, at the height of the swing era, to describe top-notch jazz performances. In the 1940s and 1950s, groove commonly came to denote musical "routine, preference, style, [or] source of pleasure."

== Description ==
=== Musicians' perspectives ===
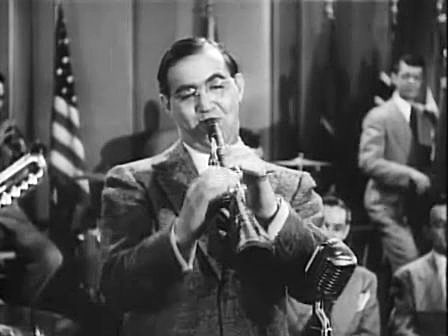
Benny Goodman, one of the first swing bandleaders to achieve widespread fame

Like the term "swing", which is used to describe a cohesive rhythmic "feel" in a jazz context, the concept of "groove" can be hard to define. Marc Sabatella's article Establishing The Groove argues that "groove is a completely subjective thing." He claims that "one person may think a given drummer has a great feel, while another person may think the same drummer sounds too stiff, and another may think he is too loose." Similarly, a bass educator states that while "groove is an elusive thing" it can be defined as "what makes the music breathe" and the "sense of motion in the context of a song".

In a musical context, general dictionaries define a groove as "a pronounced, enjoyable rhythm" or the act of "creat[ing], danc[ing] to, or enjoy[ing] rhythmic music". Steve Van Telejuice explains the "groove" as the point in this sense when he defines it as a point in a song or performance when "even the people who can't dance wanna feel like dancing..." due to the effect of the music.

The composer Bernard Coquelet argues that the "groove is the way an experienced musician will play a rhythm compared with the way it is written (or would be written)" by playing slightly "before or after the beat". Coquelet claims that the "notion of groove actually has to do with aesthetics and style"; "groove is an artistic element, that is to say human,...and "it will evolve depending on the harmonic context, the place in the song, the sound of the musician's instrument, and, in interaction with the groove of the other musicians", which he calls "collective" groove". Minute rhythmic variations by the rhythm section members such as the bass player can dramatically change the feel as a band plays a song, even for a simple singer-songwriter groove.

=== Theoretical analysis ===
UK musicologist Richard Middleton (1999) notes that while "the concept of groove" has "long [been] familiar in musicians' own usage", musicologists and theorists have only more recently begun to analyze this concept. Middleton states that a groove "... marks an understanding of rhythmic patterning that underlies its role in producing the characteristic rhythmic 'feel' of a piece". He notes that the "feel created by a repeating framework" is also modified with variations. "Groove", in terms of pattern-sequencing, is also known as "shuffle note"—where there is deviation from exact step positions.

When the musical slang phrase "Being in the groove" is applied to a group of improvisers, this has been called "an advanced level of development for any improvisational music group", which is "equivalent to Bohm and Jaworski's descriptions of an evoked field", which systems dynamics scholars claim are "forces of unseen connection that directly influence our experience and behaviour". Peter Forrester and John Bailey argue that the "chances of achieving this higher level of playing" (i.e., attain a "groove") are improved when the musicians are "open to other's musical ideas", "finding ways of complementing other participant's [sic] musical ideas", and "taking risks with the music".

Turry and Aigen cite Feld's definition of groove as "an intuitive sense of style as process, a perception of a cycle in motion, a form or organizing pattern being revealed, a recurrent clustering of elements through time". Aigen states that "when [a] groove is established among players, the musical whole becomes greater than the sum of its parts, enabling a person [...] to experience something beyond himself which he[/she] cannot create alone (Aigen 2002, p.34)".

Jeff Pressing's 2002 article claimed that a "groove or feel" is "a cognitive temporal phenomenon emerging from one or more carefully aligned concurrent rhythmic patterns, characterized by...perception of recurring pulses, and subdivision of structure in such pulses,...perception of a cycle of time, of length 2 or more pulses, enabling identification of cycle locations, and...effectiveness of engaging synchronizing body responses (e.g. dance, foot-tapping)".

=== Neuroscientific perspectives ===
The "groove" has been cited as an example of sensory-motor coupling between neural systems. Sensory-motor coupling is the coupling or integration of the sensory system and motor system. Sensorimotor integration is not a static process. For a given stimulus, there is no one single motor command. "Neural responses at almost every stage of a sensorimotor pathway are modified at short and long timescales by biophysical and synaptic processes, recurrent and feedback connections, and learning, as well as many other internal and external variables". Recent research has shown that at least some styles of modern groove-oriented rock music are characterized by an "aesthetics of exactitude" and the strongest groove stimulation could be observed for drum patterns without microtiming deviations.

== Use in different genres ==
=== Jazz ===
In some more traditional styles of jazz, the musicians often use the word "swing" to describe the sense of rhythmic cohesion of a skilled group. However, since the 1950s, musicians from the organ trio and latin jazz subgenres have also used the term "groove". Jazz flute player Herbie Mann talks a lot about "the groove." In the 1950s, Mann "locked into a Brazilian groove in the early '60s, then moved into a funky, soulful groove in the late '60s and early '70s. By the mid-'70s he was making hit disco records, still cooking in a rhythmic groove." He describes his approach to finding the groove as follows: "All you have to do is find the waves that are comfortable to float on top of." Mann argues that the "epitome of a groove record" is "Memphis Underground or Push Push", because the "rhythm section [is] locked all in one perception."

=== Reggae ===
In Jamaican reggae, dancehall, and dub music, the creole term "riddim" is used to describe the rhythm patterns created by the drum pattern or a prominent bassline. In other musical contexts a "riddim" would be called a "groove" or beat. One of the widely copied "riddims", Real Rock, was recorded in 1967 by Sound Dimension. "It was built around a single, emphatic bass note followed by a rapid succession of lighter notes. The pattern repeated over and over hypnotically. The sound was so powerful that it gave birth to an entire style of reggae meant for slow dancing called rub a dub."

=== R&B ===
The "groove" is also associated with funk performers, such as James Brown's drummers Clyde Stubblefield and Jabo Starks, and with soul music. "In the 1950s, when 'funk' and 'funky' were used increasingly as adjectives in the context of soul music—the meaning being transformed from the original one of a pungent odor to a re-defined meaning of a strong, distinctive groove." As "[t]he soul dance music of its day, the basic idea of funk was to create as intense a groove as possible." When a drummer plays a groove that "is very solid and with a great feel...", this is referred to informally as being "in the pocket"; when a drummer "maintains this feel for an extended period of time, never wavering, this is often referred to as a deep pocket."

=== Hip hop ===
A concept similar to "groove" or "swing" is also used in other African-American genres such as hip hop. The rhythmic groove that jazz artists call a sense of “swing” is sometimes referred to as having "flow" in the hip hop scene. "Flow is as elemental to hip hop as the concept of swing is to jazz". Just as the jazz concept of "swing" involves performers deliberately playing behind or ahead of the beat, the hip-hop concept of flow is about "funking with one's expectations of time"—that is, the rhythm and pulse of the music. "Flow is not about what is being said so much as how one is saying it".

=== Groove metal ===
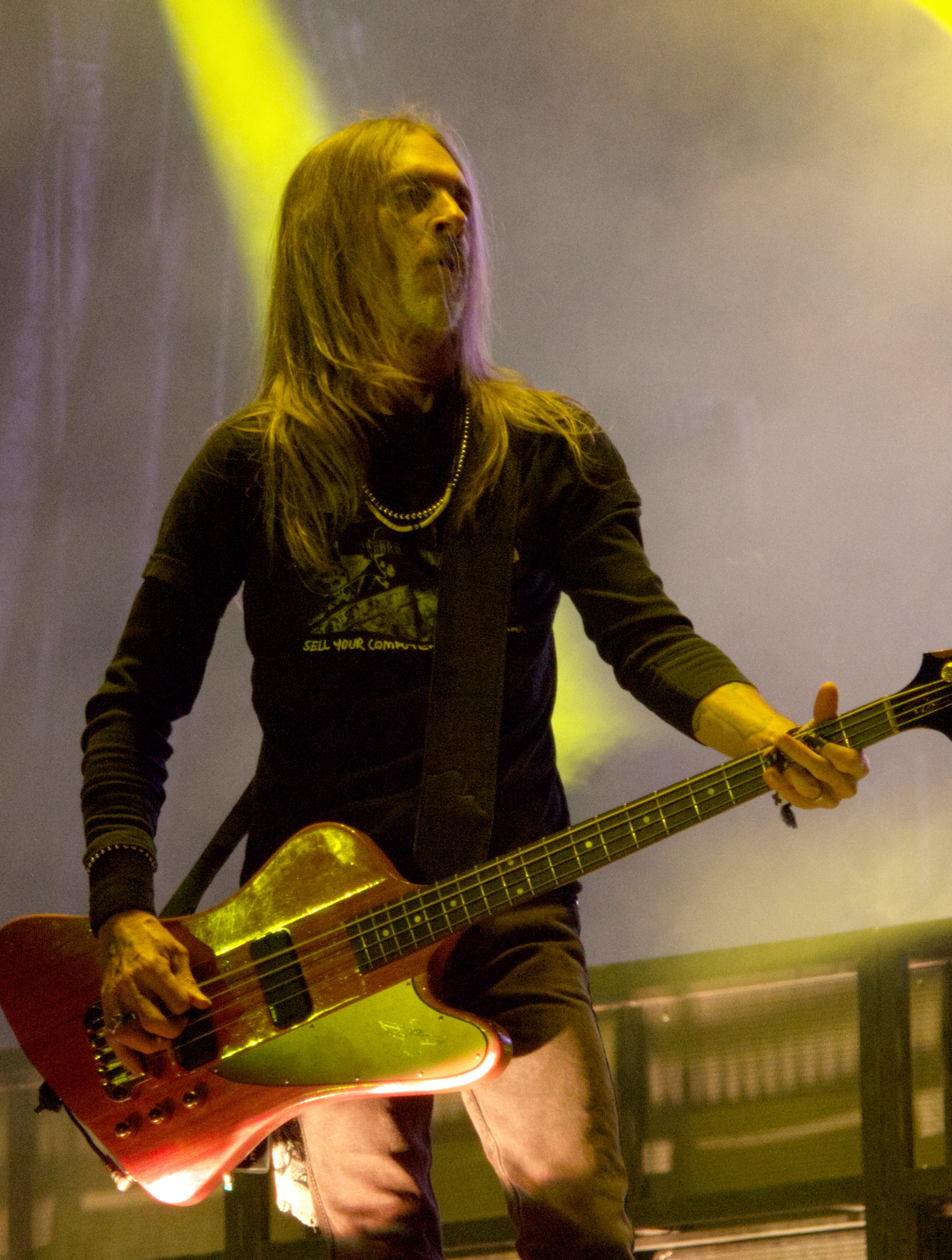
Bassist Rex Brown of Pantera, a band associated with the "groove metal" scene.

In the 1990s the term "groove" was used to describe a form of thrash metal called groove metal, which is based around the use of mid-tempo thrash riffs and detuned power chords played with heavy syncopation. "Speed wasn’t the main point anymore, it was what Pantera singer Phil Anselmo called the 'power groove.' Riffs became unusually heavy without the need of growling or the extremely distorted guitars of death metal, rhythms depended more on a heavy groove."

With heavy metal, the term "groove" can also be associated with stoner metal, sludge metal, doom metal and death metal genres as well as djent.

== See also ==
- Groove (drumming)
- Rare groove
- Tempo rubato
