= Googie Coppola =

American singer-songwriter (1950–2008)

- Born: Carolyn Brooks Gottlieb; January 2, 1950; Tallahassee, Florida, US
- Died: October 24, 2008 (aged 58)
- Other name: Googie
- Occupation: Singer-songwriter
- Years active: c. 1968–2008
- Spouses: Thomas Coppola (divorced)
- Musical career
- Genres: Jazz; Jazz rock; pop
- Labels: Embryo; Atlantic; Columbia

Carolyn Coppola, known as Googie (January 2, 1950 – October 24, 2008), was an American jazz and pop singer-songwriter. She is best known as the lead singer and songwriter of the jazz rock band Air, her collaborations with Flora Purim, Hermeto Pascoal, David Matthews, Jeremy Steig, Lenny White, and her partner Tom Coppola, together with whom she released the album "Shine The Light Of Love".

== Early life ==
Carolyn Brooks Gottlieb was born January 2, 1950, in Tallahassee, Florida to Carrie Beckham. Her mother was from Kentucky, played piano and sang. Her father played piano, accordion and also sang. In 1951, they moved to Greenpoint, Brooklyn and after two years to Little Neck, Long Island. At age seven, Googie began playing piano. She began singing in a high school trio called the "Barry Hopefuls" during her junior and senior years of high school.

== Background ==
At 16, Googie's trio performed at Manhattan College where Tom Coppola was a student and heard her. They met at a benefit gig a year later in the Maritime Academy in Greenwich Village and started rehearsing together. They were signed by Scepter Records and performed as the opening act for the Young Rascals, The Turtles and The Beach Boys, among others.

Answering an advertisement in The Village Voice, Googie met Moogy Klingman from Great Neck, New York, who introduced her to John Siegler, bass player, and Mark Rosengarden, drummer. They formed the band Air. Performing a gig at the Village Gate, Herbie Mann heard the band and signed them to his label, Embryo Records, producing and releasing their debut self-titled album Air. The band toured with Mann as his backup band in concerts including a State Department tour of the Middle East and the Montreux Jazz Festival. The release of their album with Googie as lead singer and songwriter was met with critical praise.

While signed to Herbie Mann's Embryo label and living in New York City, Googie met Luther Vandross, David Lasley and Arnold McCuller, singing backgrounds on the Morrissey-Mullen debut album Up. She collaborated with Hermeto Pascoal as a writer and vocalist, worked with Todd Rundgren and Bette Midler, and was a feature vocalist on recordings by Flora Purim, Hermeto Pascoal, Jeremy Steig, Lenny White and David Matthews cover of David Bowie's Space Oddity, among others.

== Personal life ==
Googie and Tom were married on January 7, 1968. They had their first child, Eva, that year. Googie Coppola died in 2008.
