= Bruno Carr =

American drummer

- Born: Edward Carr; February 9, 1928; The Bronx, New York, U.S.
- Died: October 25, 1993 (aged 65) Denver, Colorado, U.S.
- Genre: Jazz
- Occupation: Musician
- Instrument: Drums

Edward "Bruno" Carr (February 9, 1928 – October 25, 1993) was an American jazz drummer. Carr was a frequent collaborator with Ray Charles, and he recorded with Aretha Franklin. He was Herbie Mann's drummer from 1965 through 1969.

Carr died of lung cancer in Denver, Colorado, at the age of 65.

== Early life ==
Carr was born Edward Carr on February 9, 1928, in New York City, the son of George Carr and Florence Brown. He grew up in ethnically diverse neighbourhoods, surrounded by German and Italian communities, and developed an eclectic musical ear from an early age by listening to the radio. He began his career as a timbale player in Latin bands, an influence that remained evident throughout his career in the way he played his small tom-toms. He registered for military service in 1948.

== Career ==
Carr was one of the most in-demand session and touring drummers of his era, performing and recording with Billie Holiday, Ray Charles, John Coltrane, Charlie Parker, Aretha Franklin, Stanley Turrentine, Roy Ayers, King Curtis, Freddie Hubbard, Betty Carter, Hank Crawford, and Chic Corea, among others. He played on more than 24 albums with Herbie Mann, serving as Mann's principal drummer from 1965 through 1969. He also recorded with Lou Donaldson, Walter Davis Jr., Curtis Amy, Eddie "Cleanhead" Vinson, Bobby Short, Little Jimmy Scott, Big Joe Turner, Junior Mance, and Fred Wesley.

Despite his prolific output, Carr was famously reluctant to be recorded, and in many cases requested that his name not appear on album credits. He told Modern Drummer magazine in 1993: "I don't feel that I've ever been recorded well and anything that I'm asked to do, any drummer could do." He appeared in the concert film Ray Charles Live in Antibes, France 1961, released in 2011.

== Playing style ==
Carr's drumming was characterised by fire, conviction, and adaptability — equally capable of subtlety and restraint or intense, energised playing. He cited Elvin Jones as a model for the kind of instantly recognisable personal drumming style he aspired to develop. His Latin background gave his playing a distinctive touch on smaller tom-toms that set him apart from most jazz drummers of his generation.

== Discography ==
With Roy Ayers

- Virgo Vibes (Atlantic, 1967)

With Curtis Amy

- Mustang (Verve, 1967)

With Ray Charles

- Modern Sounds in Country and Western Music (ABC, 1962)
- Modern Sounds in Country and Western Music Volume Two (ABC, 1962)

With Walter Davis Jr.

- Illumination (Denon, 1989)

With Lou Donaldson

- Cole Slaw (Argo, 1964)

With Jean DuShon

- Make Way for Jean DuShon (Argo, 1964)

With Aretha Franklin

- Soul '69 (Atlantic, 1969)

With Herbie Mann

- Herbie Mann Plays The Roar of the Greasepaint – The Smell of the Crowd (Atlantic, 1964)
- Monday Night at the Village Gate (Atlantic, 1965)
- Latin Mann (Columbia, 1965)
- Standing Ovation at Newport (Atlantic, 1965)
- Today! (Atlantic, 1965)
- Our Mann Flute (Atlantic, 1966)
- Impressions of the Middle East (Atlantic, 1966)
- A Mann & a Woman (Atlantic, 1966) with Tamiko Jones
- The Beat Goes On (Atlantic, 1967)
- The Herbie Mann String Album (Atlantic, 1967)
- The Wailing Dervishes (Atlantic, 1967)
- Windows Opened (Atlantic, 1968)
- The Inspiration I Feel (Atlantic, 1968)
- Concerto Grosso in D Blues (Atlantic, 1968)
- Live at the Whisky a Go Go (Atlantic, 1969)
- Stone Flute (Atlantic, 1969)
- Muscle Shoals Nitty Gritty (Embryo, 1969)
- Memphis Two-Step (Embryo, 1970)

With Eddie "Cleanhead" Vinson

- The "Clean" Machine (Muse, 1978)

With Big Joe Turner

- Things That I Used to Do (Pablo, 1977)

With Joe Lee Wilson

- The Shadow (Cheetah, 1990)
