= New Mann at Newport =

Live album by Herbie Mann
- Released: 1967
- Recorded: July 4, 1966
- Venue: Newport Jazz Festival, Newport, Rhode Island
- Genre: Jazz
- Label: Atlantic
- Producer: Nesuhi Ertegun

Herbie Mann chronology
A Mann & A Woman (1967)	New Mann at Newport (1967)	Impressions of the Middle East (1967)

New Mann at Newport is a 1967 album by jazz flutist Herbie Mann. The full title on the cover is New Mann at Newport: Herbie Mann Returns to the Newport Jazz Festival & Plays She's a Carioca/All Blues/Project S/Scratch/Summertime. All but one track were recorded at the Newport Jazz Festival.

== Track listing ==
=== Side one ===
1. "Project S" (Jimmy Heath) (9:07)
2. "Scratch" (Wayne Henderson) (10:09)

=== Side two ===
1. "She's a Carioca" (Antônio Carlos Jobim, Ray Gilbert) (8:38)
2. "All Blues" (Miles Davis) (7:32)
3. "Summertime" (DuBose Heyward, George Gershwin) (6:20)

== Personnel ==
- Herbie Mann - flute
- Jimmy Owens - trumpet, flugelhorn
- Joseph Orange, Jack Hitchcock - trombones
- Reggie Workman - bass
- Carlos "Patato" Valdes - percussion
- Bruno Carr- drums

Technical

- Bill Hanley, Phil Iehle - recording engineer
- Marvin Israel - album design
- Joe Alper - cover photography
- Leonard Feather - liner notes

== Charting ==
The album peaked at 14 on the Billboard Jazz Album chart.
