= Mississippi Gambler (album) =

Studio album by Herbie Mann
- Released: 1972
- Recorded: February 11, 1972
- Studio: American Sound, Memphis
- Genre: Soul jazz Crossover jazz
- Length: 39:16
- Label: Atlantic
- Producer: Arif Mardin

Herbie Mann chronology
| Push Push (1971) | Mississippi Gambler (1972) | Hold On, I'm Comin' (1972) |

Mississippi Gambler is an album by jazz flautist Herbie Mann, released in 1972 on the Atlantic Records label. The album features saxophonist David Newman.

== Track listing ==
=== Side one ===
1. "Swing Low, Sweet Chariot" (Traditional, arranged by Mann) (5:27)
2. "Mississippi Gambler" (Mann) (6:30)
3. "Dippermouth" (Mann) (8:50)

=== Side two ===
1. "Respect Yourself" (Mack Rice, Luther Ingram) (5:28)
2. "I've Been Loving You Too Long" (Otis Redding, Jerry Butler) (5:47)
3. "(I Can't Get No) Satisfaction" (Mick Jagger, Keith Richards) (6:49)

== Personnel ==
- Herbie Mann – flute (including all flute solos)
- David Newman – tenor saxophone and flute
- Reggie Young – guitar (including all guitar solos)
- Johnny Christopher – guitar
- Bobby Wood – electric piano
- Bobby Emmons – organ
- Mike Leech – Fender bass
- Gene Chrisman – drums
- Carlos "Patato" Valdes – conga drums

Technical

- Jim Manos - cover artwork
- Joel Brodsky – inside photo
- Arif Mardin – producer
- Stan Kesler - recording engineer
- Jimmy Douglass - remix engineer

== Charting ==
The album reached #6 on Billboard magazine's Jazz Album chart.
