= Charles Ganimian =

Armenian–American musician and singer

- Born: 1926
- Origin: Armenia
- Died: 1988 (aged 61–62)
- Occupations: Musician and singer

Charles 'Chick' Ganimian (1926–1988), was an Armenian–American professional musician and singer known for his virtuosity on the oud. Ganimian played the music of Anatolia, Turkey, and Armenia.

== Early life ==
Ganimian was born in 1926 in Troy, New York, to Armenian parents who had emigrated from Marash, Turkey in 1922. In his home, he heard the music of the "old country" performed by his father, Nishan, an amateur oud player and singer. Since the family spoke both Armenian and Turkish at home, Chick became fluent in both languages. The basic repertoire he used throughout his career was molded by the music he heard and learned in his youth. Major influences were his father, Oudi Hrant Kenkuloglu, and Oudi Yorgo Bacanos. When he was ten, he studied the violin, attaining some skill on the instrument. When he was seventeen, the family moved to Washington Heights, N.Y..

== Music career ==
Chick served in the Army during World War II from 1944 to 1946. In a HOLIDAY Magazine profile from 1963, senior editor Arno Karlen quotes Chick as follows: "When I was seventeen we moved to New York City, and the next year I went into the Army and served two years. When I got out, I didn't know what to do with myself. I was playing the oud a lot, learning from my father, but there wasn't any way for someone like me to work full time as a musician-except on Eighth Avenue, and in those days it was a much smaller scene and almost entirely Greek. So I made my living butchering. On the side I formed an Armenian band, I called it the Nor-Ikes. In Armenian "nor" means new, and "ike" means sunrise. We were all young American-born Armenians, and I wanted the name to show that the traditional music was having a rebirth here. Soon more bands formed, but we were one of the first. We stuck together for fourteen years, until the end of 1961. We played Armenian weddings and parties and church affairs".

Ganimian formed the Nor-Ikes Band in 1948 with Steve Boghossian, Eddie Malkasian, Aram Davidian, and Souren Baronian. The band's name was suggested by Souren Baronian's father and means "new dawn" in Armenian. The band traveled throughout the eastern United States, developing a strong following, and, for Chick, acknowledgement as a singer and a virtuoso on the oud. Although trained as a butcher, Chick earned his living exclusively as a musician. His regular appearances at Asbury Park's Fennimore Hotel, the Catskill's Shady Hill Lodge, Waverly Hotel, Providence's Seventh Veil, Boston's Club Zahra, Atlantic City's Jockey Club, Philadelphia's Middle East Restaurant and the Yaas, New York's Pasha's, Arabian Nights, Grecian Palace, Britania, Darvish, Fez, Port Said, Cafe Feenjon, the Casbah and the Roundtable. Chick headlined and managed the entertainment at the Roundtable from 1960 to 1969. Considered the premier Middle Eastern night club in the country, it bore little resemblance to the Eighth Avenue clubs. Once a high-society, posh Upper East Side night-club, by the late 1950s its popularity had declined. At the same time, the popularity of Middle Eastern music and dance was booming. Management decided to pounce on the new craze. By this time Chick had built up a name for himself and was given a four-week contract to try out. Quoted in HOLIDAY Magazine by a senior editor, Arno Karlen (circa 1963), "I went to work in the Grecian Palace, because then it had some of the best musicians. I spent a year at the Britania. I learned Greek stuff, and then the Arabic music and language. The Roundtable decided to try belly dancing, and they needed a leader for the Oriental show. I'd been building a name, and they gave me a four-week contract to try it out. The second night they extended my contract to six months. That was two and a half years ago. I've been there ever since." He has played with Rufus Harley, and had two hit singles in the late 1950s, Daddy Lolo and Hedy Lou.

Chick Ganimian is very poorly represented on recordings. There are a few Nor-Ikes 78's, and the great "Come with me to the Casbah" album; portions of these recordings were reissued on both CD and LP in 2021 by Modern Harmonic on a Souren Baronian reissue called "The Middle Eastern Soul of Carlee Records". Other recordings include the two albums he recorded as a "side man" with jazz flutist Herbie Mann, and a few privately produced independent recordings. One of these independent recordings, from the Armenian Kef Weekend at Cape Cod, July 4 weekend 1978, was transferred to compact disk ten years later, by record producer and musician, Ara Topouzian. It was released by him under the title "Chick Ganimian Live". Ganimian only made one album, "Come with me to the Casbah"(Atco,1960). It showcases his performance and arranging skills, and his soul. His music rises off the traditional, or strict orthodox style, ascending into a tastefully progressive arrangement that retains its soul.

== Health ==
Ganimian's dependence on alcohol had a debilitating effect on his career and led to divorce with wife Jeanne, with whom he had two sons, Christopher and Mark. He continued with his music and to play the oud. In the end, he resided at the Armenian Home in Emerson, New Jersey. Charles Chick Ganimian died alone in the Veterans Hospital of South Orange, New Jersey in December 1988. To quote his friend and fellow musician, Robert Marashlian, "Chick Ganimian, and there shall be no other".

== Discography ==
With Herbie Mann

- Impressions of the Middle East (Atlantic, 1966)
- The Wailing Dervishes (Atlantic, 1967)
