= Kokopelli Records =

American record label

- Founded: 1994
- Founder: Herbie Mann; Jim Geisler
- Status: Inactive
- Genre: Jazz
- Country of origin: U.S.
- Location: Santa Fe, New Mexico

Kokopelli Records was a record label established by jazz flautist Herbie Mann and Jim Geisler in 1994. Other than Mann's recordings, Kokopelli releases included David "Fathead" Newman, Jimmy Rowles, and April Barrows. Mann had previously established Embryo Records while working for Atlantic Records.

== Discography ==
- 1994: Deep Pocket – Herbie Mann
- 1994: Opalescence – Herbie Mann
- 1994: Lilac Time – Jimmy Rowles
- 1994: Mr. Gentle Mr. Cool: A Tribute to Duke Ellington – David "Fathead" Newman, Ron Carter, Lewis Nash
- 1994: I'll Be Seeing You – Bobby Myhre
- 1995: Peace Pieces – Herbie Mann
- 1995: Black Orpheus – Trio da Paz
- 1995: Blue River – Steve Barta
- 1996: Edward Simon – Edward Simon
- 1996: Under Woodstock Moon – David "Fathead" Newman
- 1995: The Planet Is Alive...Let it Live! – Sarah Vaughan
- 1995: Urban Renewel – Bobby Watson
- 1996: Dark Hero – Sam Riney
- 1995: Storyteller – Ricardo Silveira
- 1996: Bop N Blues – Cornell Dupree
- 1995: River Wide – Brasilia
- 1996: Facing Wes – Ronald Muldrow
- 1996: Portrait of Silk Thread by Dutch Jazz Orchestra
- 1997: Nic Nacs – Nicolas Bearde
- 1998: Steppin Out – The Braxton Brothers
- 1998: Sliding In – Pete McGuinness
- 1998: Best Kept Secret by Positive ID

== See also ==
- Herbie Mann discography
