= Joe Puma =

American jazz guitarist

- Born: August 13, 1927; New York
- Died: May 31, 2000 (aged 72) New York
- Genres: Jazz
- Occupation: Musician
- Instrument: Guitar
- Years active: 1949–2000

Joe Puma (August 13, 1927 – May 31, 2000) was an American jazz guitarist.

Puma was born in the Bronx, New York. His first professional experience came with Joe Roland in 1949–50. He played in the band led by Cy Coleman. He acted as a session musician for many jazz musicians during the 1950s, including Louie Bellson, Artie Shaw's Gramercy Five, Eddie Bert, Herbie Mann, Mat Mathews, Chris Connor, and Paul Quinichette, Lee Konitz, and Dick Hyman; he also recorded extensively as a leader at this time. In the 1960s, he worked with Morgana King, Bobby Hackett, Gary Burton, and Carmen McRae, and between 1972 and 1977 he and Chuck Wayne led an ensemble. He continued to perform and teach into the late 1990s.

== Honors ==
In 1957 he won the New Star Award for Guitar from Metronome Magazine.

== Discography ==
=== As leader ===
- Joe Puma (Bethlehem, 1954)
- Wild Kitten (Dawn, 1957)
- The Fourmost Guitars with Jimmy Raney, Chuck Wayne, Dick Garcia (ABC-Paramount, 1957)
- Jazz (Jubilee, 1958)
- Like Tweet: Jazz Versions of Authentic Bird Calls (Columbia, 1961)
- Interactions with Chuck Wayne (Choice, 1974)
- Shining Hour with Hod O'Brien, Red Mitchell (Reservoir, 1987)
- It's a Blue World with Murray Wall, bass; Eddie Locke, drums (Euphoria, 1999)

=== As sideman ===
With Louis Bellson

- The Amazing Artistry of Louis Bellson (Norgran, 1954)
- The Exciting Mr. Bellson (Norgran, 1954)
- Skin Deep (Norgran, 1955)

With Chris Connor

- This Is Chris (Bethlehem, 1955)
- Chris (Bethlehem, 1956)
- Chris Connor Sings the George Gershwin Almanac of Song (Atlantic, 1957)
- A Jazz Date with Chris Connor (Atlantic, 1958)

With Morgana King

- Stretchin' Out (Muse, 1978)
- Looking Through the Eyes of Love (Muse, 1981)
- Portraits (Muse, 1984)
- This is Always (Muse, 1994)

With Herbie Mann

- Flamingo (Bethlehem, 1955)
- Herbie Mann Plays (Bethlehem, 1956)
- Love and the Weather (Bethlehem, 1956)
- The Herbie Mann-Sam Most Quintet (Bethlehem, 1956)
- Flute Soufflé (Prestige, 1957)
- Flute Flight (Prestige, 1957)
- Salute to the Flute (Epic, 1957)
- Yardbird Suite (Savoy, 1957)
- The Jazz We Heard Last Summer (Savoy, 1957)
- Sultry Serenade (Riverside, 1958)
- Gone Native (Savoy, 1961)
- When Lights Are Low (Portrait Masters, 1988)

With Artie Shaw

- Artie Shaw and His Gramercy Five Album #3 (Clef, 1954)
- Artie Shaw and His Gramercy Five Album #4 (Clef, 1955)
- The Last Recordings Rare & Unreleased (MusicMasters, 1991)
- More Last Recordings: The Final Sessions (MusicMasters, 1993)

With others

- Eddie Bert, Encore (Savoy, 1955)
- Vinnie Burke, The Vinnie Burke All-Stars (ABC-Paramount, 1956)
- Gary Burton, The Groovy Sound of Music (RCA, 1964)
- Cándido Camero, Candido (ABC-Paramount, 1956)
- Cándido Camero, In Indigo (ABC-Paramount, 1958)
- King Curtis, Have Tenor Sax, Will Blow (ATCO, 1959)
- Don Elliott, The Don Elliott Quintet (RCA Victor, 1954)
- Bob Gibson - Ski Songs (Elektra, 1959)
- Wycliffe Gordon, Blues of Summer
- Dick Hyman, Swings Music from Whoop-Up (MGM, 1959)
- Dick Hyman, Strictly Organ-ic! (MGM, 1960)
- Peter Ind, Looking Out (Esquire, 1960)
- Steve Lacy, The Complete Whitey Mitchell Sessions
- Mat Mathews, The Modern Art of Jazz by Mat Mathews (Dawn, 1956)
- Carmen McRae, Woman Talk (Mainstream, 1966)
- Helen Merrill, Chasin' the Bird (Inner City, 1980)
- Whitey Mitchell, Whitey Mitchell Sextette (ABC-Paramount, 1956)
- Marty Napoleon, Marty Napoleon and His Music (Stere-o-Craft 1958)
- Bernard Peiffer, Bernie's Tunes (EmArcy, 1956)
- Joe Roland, Joltin' Joe Roland (Savoy, 1955)
- Ralph Sharon, Easy Jazz Ralph Sharon's All-Star Sextet (London, 1955)
- Sue & Ralph Sharon, Mr & Mrs Jazz (Bethlehem, 1957)
- Roy Smeck, The Magic Ukulele of Roy Smeck, Wizard of the Strings (ABC-Paramount, 1959)
- Kirby Stone Four, Frank Loesser's Broadway Hit Guys & Dolls (Columbia, 1962)
- Sir Charles Thompson, Rockin' Rhythm (Columbia, 1961)
- Warren Vaché Jr., Horn of Plenty (Muse, 1993)
- Mal Waldron, Soul Eyes: The Mal Waldron Memorial Album
- Webster Young, For Lady (Prestige, 1957)
