= Whitey Mitchell =

American jazz bassist and TV writer/producer

- Born: George Mitchell; February 22, 1932; Hackensack, New Jersey, U.S.
- Died: January 16, 2009 (aged 76) Palm Springs, California
- Genres: Jazz
- Occupations: Musician, TV producer, screenwriter
- Instrument: Bass
- Years active: 1966–1994

Gordon "Whitey" Mitchell (February 22, 1932 – January 16, 2009) was an American jazz bassist and television writer/producer. He was born in Hackensack, New Jersey.

== Life and career ==
Mitchell was the brother of bassist Red Mitchell. He began on clarinet and tuba as a youngster before choosing bass as his primary instrument. He studied radio & television at Syracuse University and then plunged into the New York jazz scene, becoming a regular at the famed nightspots Birdland and Basin Street East. He led his own groups at The Village Vanguard and The Embers and later toured with big band greats Benny Goodman and Pete Rugolo, played Carnegie Hall with Gene Krupa, appeared with Buddy Rich, Ella Fitzgerald, Dizzy Gillespie and Lester Young on Jazz At The Philharmonic. He played with Elinor Sherry and Shep Fields in the early 1950s before serving in the Army during the Korean War. From 1954 he worked freelance in New York City, playing with Gene Krupa (1955), Mel Tormé, Jack Jones, J.J. Johnson, Kai Winding, Pete Rugolo, Lester Young, Charlie Ventura, Herbie Mann, Betty Roche, Oscar Pettiford (1956–1957), Gene Quill, Joe Puma, Johnny Richards, Peter Appleyard, André Previn, and Benny Goodman (1963–1964). He performed on hundreds of recording sessions, television and film scores but only released one album under his own leadership on ABC-Paramount in 1956, and one with Red and Blue Mitchell in 1958 as "The Mitchells: Red, Whitey & Blue," released on MetroJazz Records. Mitchell recorded with Anita O'Day, Barbra Streisand, Anthony Newley, and played the bass solo introduction on Ben E. King's hit record "Stand by Me". He often placed in the Metronome and Downbeat jazz polls.

After 1965 he largely ceased playing jazz and moved to Hollywood on advice from Lenny Bruce and André Previn to pursue a career as a television writer. He worked on shows such as Get Smart, All in the Family, The Jeffersons, Good Times, The Mary Tyler Moore Show, The Odd Couple, Mork and Mindy, and several Bob Hope television specials. He wrote the feature film Private Resort starring Johnny Depp.

Mitchell taught screenwriting at UCLA and UC Riverside. In 1995 he, and his wife Marilyn, moved to Palm Desert, California, where he had his own radio show, The Power Lunch and wrote a golf column for a local magazine. He recorded his CD Just In Time and played jazz in all the nightclub venues. He was the author of two books, Hackensack to Hollywood: My Two Show Business Careers and Star Walk: A Guide to the Palm Springs Walk of Stars.

Mitchell was a board member of the Palm Springs Walk of Stars and was honored with his own Golden Palm Star in tribute to his two show business careers in 2006. He's been inducted into his New Jersey high school's Distinguished Alumni Hall of Fame.

== Discography ==
=== As leader/co-leader ===
- Whitey Mitchell Sextette (ABC Paramount, 1956)
- Get Those Elephants Out'a Here (MetroJazz, 1958) with Red Mitchell, Blue Mitchell and André Previn
- Just in Time (2004)

=== As sideman ===
With Buck Clayton and Tommy Gwaltney's Kansas City 9

- Goin' to Kansas City (Riverside, 1960)

With Herbie Mann

- Herbie Mann Plays (Bethlehem, 1956)
- Love and the Weather (Bethlehem, 1956)

With Oscar Pettiford

- The Oscar Pettiford Orchestra in Hi-Fi (ABC-Paramount, 1956)

With Betty Roché

- Take the "A" Train (Bethlehem, 1956)

With Pete Rugolo

- Rugolomania (Columbia, 1955)
- New Sounds by Pete Rugolo (Harmony, 1954–55, [1957])
