= Tom Coppola =

- Born: Thomas Wilkinson Coppola; June 6, 1945
- Died: December 29, 2023 (aged 78)
- Genres: Pop; jazz
- Occupations: Pianist; Composer; Arranger
- Instrument: Piano
- Label: Columbia
- Formerly of: Air

Thomas Wilkinson Coppola (June 6, 1945 - December 29, 2023) was a pianist, composer and arranger, known for being a principal member of the group Air. He also formed Evans and Coppola with vocalist Lucianne Evans and performed with the Tom Coppola Trio.

Tom Coppola began working as a musician in Manhattan in the 1960s, where he met Carolyn Brooks (soon to become Googie Coppola) and Air was formed. Air's self-titled first album was released in 1971. The band's best known album, Shine the Light of Love was released in 1980. Subsequently, the group went on permanent hiatus.

He worked for NBC as a music producer on Saturday Night Live from 1984 to 1990. In 1991 Coppola went to the University of Southern California to study jazz. He later moved to Asheville, North Carolina, where he performed in several groups, including Evans & Coppola and the Tom Coppola Trio, and taught in the music department at the University of North Carolina at Asheville.

Coppola was also associated with musicians Herbie Mann. Lenny White, Bobby Matos, and Chick Corea.

He died on December 29, 2023.

== Publications ==
- Jazz Standards for Piano, Hal Leonard Publishing Corporation, January 1, 1998
