= The Jazz We Heard Last Summer =

Studio album by Sahib Shihab/Herbie Mann
- Released: 1957
- Recorded: May 2 and June 7, 1957
- Studio: Van Gelder, Hackensack
- Genre: Jazz
- Length: 34:13
- Label: Savoy; MG 12112
- Producer: Ozzie Cadena

Sahib Shihab chronology
| The Jazz We Heard Last Summer (1957) | Jazz Sahib (1957) |

Herbie Mann chronology
| Salute to the Flute (1957) | The Jazz We Heard Last Summer (1957) | Mann Alone (1957) |

The Jazz We Heard Last Summer is a split album featuring saxophonist Sahib Shihab and flautist Herbie Mann's groups recorded in 1957 for the Savoy label.

== Reception ==
Professional ratings
Review scores
| Source | Rating |
|---|---|
| Allmusic | 3/5 stars |

Allmusic awarded the album 3 stars stating "Generally speaking, the Shihab tracks are a bit meatier, causing the momentum to taper off toward the end of the disc. This should not, however, sway fans of late-'50s bop, as a number of the scene's top players are featured on this admittedly short set".

== Track listing ==
Side One:

1. "S.M.T.W.T.F.S.S. Blues" (Sahib Shihab) - 6:36
2. "Rockaway" (John Jenkins) - 6:43
3. "The Things We Did Last Summer" (Jule Styne, Sammy Cahn) - 7:03

Side Two:

1. "Green Stamp Monsta" (Herbie Mann) - 7:58
2. "World Wide Boots" (Phil Woods) - 8:22

== Personnel ==
=== Side One ===
- John Jenkins - alto saxophone - lead melody track 3
- Clifford Jordan - tenor saxophone
- Sahib Shihab - baritone saxophone
- Hank Jones - piano
- Addison Farmer - bass
- Dannie Richmond - drums

=== Side Two ===
- Herbie Mann - flute, tenor saxophone
- Phil Woods - alto saxophone
- Eddie Costa - piano, vibraphone
- Joe Puma - guitar
- Wilbur Ware - bass
- Jerry Segal - drums
