= Memphis Two-Step =

Studio album by Herbie Mann
- Released: 1971
- Recorded: September – November 1970
- Genre: Soul jazz
- Label: Embryo Records
- Producer: Herbie Mann

Herbie Mann chronology
Muscle Shoals Nitty Gritty (1970)	Memphis Two-Step (1971)	Push Push (1971)

Memphis Two-Step is a 1971 album by jazz flutist Herbie Mann. It was released on Mann's Embryo Records label, and distributed by Cotillion Records, a division of Atlantic Records.

== Track listing ==
- Side A (tracks 1–4)/Side One (sic) (tracks 5–7)
1. "Soul Man" (Isaac Hayes, David Porter) (4:49)
2. "The Night They Drove Old Dixie Down" (J. R. Robertson )(5:25)
3. "Memphis Two-Step" (Don Sebesky) (6:27)
4. "Down on the Corner" (John Fogerty) (5:50)
5. "Guinnevere" (David Crosby) (8:00)
6. "Acapulco Rain" (Mann) (7:54)
7. "Kabuki Rock" (William S. Fischer) (5:30)

== Personnel ==
- Herbie Mann - flute, producer
  - Tracks 1, 2:
- Melvin Lastie and Ike Williams - flugelhorns and trumpets (#1,2)
- George Bohanon - trombone and baritone horn
- Albert Vescovo - guitar
- John Barnes - drums
- Darrell Clayborn - bass
- Richard Waters - drums
  - Track 3:
- Roy Ayers - vibes
- Larry Coryell and Reggie Young - guitars
- Bobby Emmons - organ
- Bobby Wood - electric piano
- Mike Leech - Fender bass
- Gene Chrisman - drums
  - Remaining tracks:
- Eric Weissberg, Sonny Sharrock and Charlie Brown - guitars
- Miroslav Vitouš - bass
- Bruno Carr - drums
- Carlos "Patato" Valdes - conga (track 4)
- Richard Resnicoff - guitar (replacing Charlie Brown on tracks 6, 7)
- Ron Carter - bass (tracks 6, 7)
- Eddie Simon - rainmaker (track 6)

Technical

- Tom Dowd, David Green - recording engineer
- Katsuji Abe - photography
- Haig Adishian - album design

== Production ==
- Tracks 1, 2 recorded at United Recording Studios, Los Angeles, California
- Track 3 recorded at American Sound Studios, Memphis, Tennessee, engineered by Tom Dowd
- All other selections recorded at A&R Studios, New York City

== Charting ==
Embryo Records logo, from the 45 single

The album peaked at #3 on the Billboard Jazz Album chart, #41 on the Billboard R&B Album chart, and #137 on the Billboard 200. "Memphis Two-Step" and "Soul Man" were released as a single.

== See also ==
- Herbie Mann discography
