= Muscle Shoals Nitty Gritty =

Studio album by Herbie Mann
- Released: 1970
- Recorded: December 9–11, 1969
- Studio: Muscle Shoals, Sheffield
- Genre: Crossover jazz, Soul jazz
- Label: Embryo
- Producer: Tom Dowd

Herbie Mann chronology
Stone Flute (1970)	Muscle Shoals Nitty Gritty (1970)	Memphis Two-Step (1970)

Muscle Shoals Nitty Gritty is a 1970 album by jazz flutist Herbie Mann. It was released on Mann's Embryo Records label, and distributed by Cotillion Records, a division of Atlantic Records.

== Track listing ==
Side One

1. "Muscle Shoals Nitty Gritty" (Mann) (6:47)
2. "Claudia Pie" (Mann) (4:38)
3. "Can You Dig It" (Ed Birdsong) (5:51)

Side Two

1. "Blind Willy" (Sonny Sharrock) (4:47)
2. "Come Together" (John Lennon, Paul McCartney) (10:00)
3. "Panama Red's Panama Hat" (Mann) (5:11)

== Personnel ==
=== "Come Together" ===
- Herbie Mann - flute
- Roy Ayers - vibes
- Eddie Hinton - guitar
- Barry Beckett - piano
- David Hood & Miroslav Vitouš - bass
- Roger Hawkins & Bruno Carr - drums

=== "Panama Red's Panama Hat” ===
- As above, with Eddie Hinton - bottleneck guitar, Jimmy Johnson (also engineer) added on guitar

=== Other selections ===
- Herbie Mann - flute
- Richard Waters - drums
- Andrew Love & Ed Logan - tenor saxophone
- James Mitchell - baritone saxophone
- Wayne Jackson - trumpet
- Roy Ayers - vibes
- Eddie Hinton - guitar
- Barry Beckett - piano
- David Hood - bass
- Roger Hawkins - drums

==== "Can You Dig It" ====
- As above, with Jimmy Johnson - guitar

==== "Blind Willy" ====
- As above, with Roger Hawkins on Jews harp, replaced by Bruno Carr on drums
- Album photography - Joel Brodsky
- Album design - Haig Adishian

record logo

== Production ==
- Recorded at Muscle Shoals Sound Studios, Muscle Shoals, Alabama
- Jimmy Johnson & Marlin Green - Recording engineers
- Tom Dowd - Producer

== Charting ==
The album peaked at #9 on the Billboard Jazz Album chart.

== See also ==
- Herbie Mann discography
