= Mann Alone =

Studio album by Herbie Mann
- Released: 1957
- Recorded: May 9, 1957; New York City
- Genre: Jazz
- Label: Savoy; MG 12107

Herbie Mann chronology
The Jazz We Heard Last Summer (1957)	Mann Alone (1957)	Yardbird Suite (1957)

Mann Alone is solo album by American jazz flautist Herbie Mann featuring tracks recorded in 1957 for the Savoy label.

== Reception ==
Professional ratings
Review scores
Source	Rating
Allmusic	3/5 stars

Allmusic awarded the album 3 stars In the Honolulu Star-Bulletin, Seth Markow called it "an audacious album of solo flute".

== Track listing ==
1. "Happy Happy" - 3:30
2. "Looking Thru the Window" - 4:00
3. "Like, You Know, Baby" - 5:50
4. "Love" - 5:15
5. "All Day Monday" - 6:20
6. "From Midnight On" - 3:25
7. "For the Love of Kali" - 4:20
8. "Ruth, Ruth" - 3:40

== Personnel ==
- Herbie Mann - flute, alto flute
