= Salute to the Flute =

Studio album by Herbie Mann
- Released: 1957
- Recorded: April 18 & 29, 1957
- Genre: Jazz
- Label: Epic; LN 3395

Herbie Mann chronology
Sultry Serenade (1957)	Salute to the Flute (1957)	The Jazz We Heard Last Summer (1957)

Salute to the Flute (reissued as When Lights Are Low) is an album by American jazz flautist Herbie Mann featuring tracks recorded in 1957 for the Epic label.

== Reception ==
Professional ratings
Review scores
Source	Rating
AllMusic	4/5 stars

AllMusic awarded the album 4 stars and in its review by Scott Yanow, he states: "Mann proves to be an excellent bop soloist".

== Track listing ==
1. "When Lights Are Low" (A. K. Salim) - 6:02
2. "Little Niles" (Randy Weston) - 6:10
3. "Old Honky Tonk Piano Roll Blues" (Herbie Mann) - 4:42
4. "Pretty Baby" (Salim) - 4:57
5. "Beautiful Love" (Wayne King, Victor Young, Egbert Van Alstyne) - 6:30
6. "Hip Scotch" (Joe Puma) - 3:40
7. "Song for Ruth" (Mann) - 4:22
8. "Noga's Nuggets" (Oscar Pettiford) - 4:04
9. "A Ritual" (Mann) - 3:47

== Personnel ==
- Herbie Mann - flute, alto flute
- Bernie Glow, Don Stratton, Joe Wilder - trumpet (tracks 1, 5 & 9)
- Urbie Green, Chauncey Welsch - trombone (tracks 1, 5 & 9)
- Anthony Ortega - alto saxophone (tracks 1, 2, 4, 5, 7 & 9)
- Dick Hafer alto saxophone, tenor saxophone (tracks 1, 2, 4, 5, 7 & 9)
- Dave Kurtzer - tenor saxophone (tracks 2, 4 & 7)
- Sol Schlinger - baritone saxophone (tracks 1, 5 & 9)
- Joe Puma - guitar, arranger
- Hank Jones - piano (tracks 1, 2, 4, 5, 7 & 9)
- Oscar Pettiford - bass, arranger
- Gus Johnson (tracks 1, 3, 5, 6, 8 & 9), Philly Joe Jones (tracks 2, 4 & 7) - drums
- Gigi Gryce (tracks 2 & 3), A. K. Salim (tracks 1, 4, 5 & 9) - arranger
