= Herbie Mann with the Wessel Ilcken Trio =

Album by Herbie Mann

Studio album by Herbie Mann with the Wessel Ilcken Trio
- Released: 1958
- Recorded: November 8, 1956; Hilversum, Holland
- Genre: Jazz
- Label: Epic; LN 3499

Herbie Mann chronology
| Mann in the Morning (1956) | Herbie Mann with the Wessel Ilcken Trio (1958) | Flute Flight (1957) |

Herbie Mann with the Wessel Ilcken Trio (also released as Salute to the Flute) is an album by American jazz flautist Herbie Mann featuring tracks recorded in Holland in 1956 for the Epic label.

== Reception ==
Professional ratings
Review scores
| Source | Rating |
|---|---|
| Allmusic | 2/5 stars |

Allmusic awarded the album 2 stars.

== Track listing ==
All compositions by Herbie Mann except as indicated

1. "Lady Bach" - 2:16
2. "Little Girl" (Madeline Hyde, Francis Henry) - 2:53
3. "Imagination" (Jimmy Van Heusen, Johnny Burke) - 2:49
4. "Love Is Here to Stay" (George Gershwin, Ira Gershwin) - 2:34
5. "The Lady Is a Tramp" (Richard Rodgers, Lorenz Hart) - 2:59
6. "Dear Old Stockholm" (Traditional) - 2:47
7. "Falling in Love with Love" (Rodgers, Hart) - 2:48
8. "Summertime" (George Gershwin, DuBose Heyward) - 4:23
9. "Blues for Leila" - 6:13
10. "Lover Come Back to Me" (Sigmund Romberg, Oscar Hammerstein II) - 3:29
11. "Try a Little Tenderness" (Jimmy Campbell, Reg Connelly, Harry M. Woods) - 2:39
12. "Afro Blues" - 2:14

== Personnel ==
- Herbie Mann - flute, tenor saxophone
- Ado Broodboom - trumpet (tracks 2, 4, 5 & 7)
- Pim Jacobs - piano
- Ruud Jacobs - bass
- Wessel Ilcken - drums
