= Illumination (Walter Davis Jr. album) =

Studio album by Walter Davis Jr.
- Recorded: February–December 1977
- Studio: A&R Studios, New York City; Sound Ideas Studios, NYC
- Genre: Avant-garde jazz, modal jazz, post-bop
- Length: 69:49
- Label: Denon Records; Pony Canyon Records

Original issue
Review scores
Source	Rating
Allmusic	3/5 stars

Illumination is an album by the jazz pianist Walter Davis Jr. Davis uses an out-of-tune piano and the cover shows Davis at a toy piano.

== Track listing ==
All tracks composed by Walter Davis Jr. unless otherwise indicated.

1. "Scorpio Rising"
2. "Illumination"
3. "Ronnie's a Dynamite Lady"
4. "Backgammon"
5. "Abide with Me" (Henry Francis Lyte)
6. "Crowded Elevator"
7. "Theme from 'La Strada'" (Nino Rota)
8. "Biribinya Nos States"
9. "Just One of Those Things" (Cole Porter)
10. "Pranayama"
11. "I'll Keep Loving You" (Bud Powell)

== Personnel ==
- Walter Davis Jr. – piano
- Carter Jefferson – tenor saxophone
- Charles Sullivan – trumpet
- Jeremy Steig – flute
- Buster Williams – bass
- Bruno Carr – drums
- Art Blakey – drums
- Tony Williams – drums
- Naná Vasconcelos – percussion (8)
- Milton Frustino – guitar (8)
