= Flamingo (Herbie Mann album) =

Studio album by The Herbie Mann Quartet
- Released: 1955
- Recorded: June 1955; New York City
- Genre: Jazz
- Labels: Bethlehem; BCP 24

Herbie Mann chronology
| Flamingo (1955) | The Herbie Mann-Sam Most Quintet (1955) |

Flamingo is an album by flautist Herbie Mann on the Bethlehem label which was recorded in 1955. The album opens with Mann playing four flutes via the use of overdubbing.

== Reception ==
Professional ratings
Review scores
| Source | Rating |
|---|---|
| Allmusic | 3/5 stars |

Allmusic awarded the album 3 stars.

== Track listing ==
All compositions by Herbie Mann except where noted.

1. "I've Told Ev'ry Little Star" (Jerome Kern, Oscar Hammerstein II) – 4:40
2. "Love Is a Simple Thing" (Arthur Siegel, June Carroll) – 2:00
3. "There's No You" (Hal Hopper, Tom Adair) – 4:12
4. "Sorimaό" – 3:25
5. "The Influential Mr. Cohn" – 2:33
6. "A One Way Love" – 3:16
7. "The Surrey with the Fringe on Top" (Richard Rodgers, Hammerstein) – 2:39
8. "Flamingo" (Ted Grouya, Edmund Anderson) – 2:43
9. "Little Orphan Annie" (Gus Kahn, Joe Sanders) – 3:28
10. "Jasmin" (Quincy Jones) – 3:00
11. "Beverly" – 2:04
12. "Woodchuck" (Joe Puma) – 2:54

== Personnel ==
- Herbie Mann – flute, tenor saxophone
- Joe Puma – guitar
- Chuck Andrus – bass
- Harold Granowsky – drums
