= Love and the Weather =

Studio album by Herbie Mann and Orchestra
- Released: 1956
- Recorded: March 1956; New York City
- Genre: Jazz
- Length: 41:08
- Label: Bethlehem; BCP 63

Herbie Mann chronology
Herbie Mann Plays (1956)	Love and the Weather (1956)	Mann in the Morning (1956)

Love and the Weather is an album by flautist Herbie Mann and Orchestra released under the Bethlehem label in 1956.

== Track listing ==
1. "Love and the Weather" (Irving Berlin) - 3:50
2. "But Beautiful" (Jimmy Van Heusen, Johnny Burke) - 2:56
3. "Spring Can Really Hang You Up the Most" (Tommy Wolf, Fran Landesman) - 3:31
4. "I'm Glad There Is You" (Jimmy Dorsey, Paul Madeira) - 3:22
5. "A Sinner Kissed an Angel" (Mack David, Richard M. Jones, Ray Joseph) - 3:13
6. "High on a Windy Hill" (Alex Kramer, Joan Whitney) - 3:35
7. "Ill Wind" (Harold Arlen, Ted Koehler) - 3:47
8. "For Heaven's Sake" (Elise Bretton, Sherman Edwards, Donald Meyer) - 3:21
9. "Autumn Nocturne" (Kim Gannon, Josef Myrow) - 4:21
10. "Moon Love" (Mack David, Mack Davis, Andre Kostelanetz) - 2:43
11. "Morning Side of the Mountain" (Larry Lawrence Stock, Dick Manning) - 3:24
12. "Like Someone in Love" (Van Heusen, Burke) - 2:59

== Personnel ==
- Herbie Mann - flute
- Joe Puma - guitar
- Milt Hinton (tracks 1–6), Whitey Mitchell (tracks 7–12) - bass
- Don Lamond (tracks 1–6), Herb Wasserman (track 7–12) - drums
- Unidentified orchestra arranged and conducted by Ralph Burns (tracks 1–6) and Frank Hunter (tracks 7–12)
