= The Inspiration I Feel =

Studio album by Herbie Mann
- Released: 1968
- Recorded: May 6–7, 1968; New York City
- Genre: Jazz
- Length: 34:28
- Label: Atlantic; SD 1513
- Producer: Nesuhi Ertegun, Joel Dorn

Herbie Mann chronology
Windows Opened (1968)	The Inspiration I Feel (1968)	Memphis Underground (1968)

The Inspiration I Feel is an album by flautist Herbie Mann featuring tunes associated with Ray Charles recorded in 1968 and released on the Atlantic label.

== Reception ==
Professional ratings
Review scores
Source	Rating
AllMusic	2.5/5 stars

AllMusic awarded the album 2½ stars and its review by Scott Yanow states, "The renditions on this out-of-print LP will not make anyone forget the influential singer, but they are reasonably enjoyable and respectful".

== Track listing ==
1. "Lonely Avenue" (Doc Pomus) - 6:22
2. "Drown in My Own Tears" (Henry Glover) - 5:05
3. "Sticks and Stones" (Titus Turner) - 5:40
4. "I Got a Woman" (Ray Charles, Renald Richard) - 7:53
5. "Come Rain or Come Shine" (Harold Arlen, Johnny Mercer) - 4:41
6. "Georgia on My Mind" (Hoagy Carmichael, Stuart Gorrell) - 4:47

== Personnel ==
- Herbie Mann - flute with unidentified large band with voices on some tracks featuring:
- David Newman - tenor saxophone
- Sonny Sharrock - guitar
- Miroslav Vitouš - bass
- Bruno Carr - drums
- William S. Fischer - arranger, conductor

Technical

- Adrian Barber - recording engineer
- Haig Adishian - album design
- Dimitrie Berea - cover portrait of Herbie Mann
