= Hold On, I'm Comin' (Herbie Mann album) =

Live album by Herbie Mann
- Released: 1973
- Recorded: June 25 and July 8, 1972; Montreux Jazz Festival in Montreux, Switzerland and Yankee Stadium, NYC
- Genre: Jazz
- Length: 38:10
- Label: Atlantic; SD 1632
- Producer: Andy Muson, David Newman, Herbie Mann, Pat Rebillot, Reggie Ferguson, Sonny Sharrock

Herbie Mann chronology
Mississippi Gambler (1972)	Hold On, I'm Comin' (1973)	Turtle Bay (1973)

Hold On, I'm Comin' is a live album by flautist Herbie Mann recorded in 1973 at the New York Jazz Festival, with one track from the Montreux Jazz Festival, and released on the Atlantic label.

== Reception ==
Professional ratings
Review scores
Source	Rating
Allmusic	4/5 stars

The Allmusic site awarded the album 4 stars stating: "This is one of the best Herbie Mann recordings and arguably his most rewarding of the 1970s. ...The high quality of the solos and the spirited ensembles (which were inspired by the audience at the 1972 New York Jazz Festival) make this a generally memorable session".

== Track listing ==
All compositions by Herbie Mann except as indicated

1. "(Gimme Some of That Good Old) Soul Beat Momma" - 7:34
2. "Never Can Say Goodbye" (Clifton Davis) - 4:34
3. "Respect Yourself" (Luther Ingram, Mack Rice) - 8:50
4. "Memphis Underground" - 13:04
5. "Hold On, I'm Comin'" (Isaac Hayes, David Porter) - 4:08
- Recorded at the Pavillon Montreux in Switzerland on June 25 (track 3) and Yankee Stadium, NYC on July 8 (tracks 1, 2, 4 & 5), 1972

== Personnel ==
- Herbie Mann - flute
- David Newman - tenor saxophone, flute
- Pat Rebillot - electric piano
- Sonny Sharrock - guitar
- Andy Muson - bass
- Reggie Ferguson - drums

Technical

- Michael DeLugg, Stephan Sulke - recording engineer
- Gene Paul - remix engineer
- Katsuji Abe - photography
