= Yardbird Suite (Herbie Mann album) =

Studio album by Herbie Mann
- Released: 1957
- Recorded: May 14, 1957
- Studio: Van Gelder, Hackensack
- Genre: Jazz
- Length: 34:13
- Label: Savoy; MG 12108
- Producer: Ozzie Cadena

Herbie Mann chronology
| Mann Alone (1957) | Yardbird Suite (1957) | Great Ideas of Western Mann (1957) |

Yardbird Suite is an album by American jazz flautist Herbie Mann featuring tracks recorded in 1957 for the Savoy label.

== Reception ==
Professional ratings
Review scores
| Source | Rating |
|---|---|
| Allmusic | 4/5 stars |
| The Penguin Guide to Jazz Recordings | 3/4 stars |

Allmusic awarded the album 4 stars stating "this is a solid document of all of the participants' burgeoning skills, and increasing cache as modern jazz masters".

== Track listing ==
1. "Yardbird Suite" (Charlie Parker) - 5:52
2. "Here's That Mann" (Eddie Costa) - 4:22
3. "One for Tubby" (Joe Puma) - 6:04
4. "Squire's Parlor" (Phil Woods) - 4:48
5. "Who Knew?" (Puma) - 7:08
6. "Opicana" (Puma) - 5:24

== Personnel ==
- Herbie Mann - flute, tenor saxophone
- Phil Woods - alto saxophone
- Eddie Costa - piano, vibraphone
- Joe Puma - guitar
- Wendell Marshall - bass
- Bobby Donaldson - drums
