= Concerto Grosso in D Blues =

Studio album by Herbie Mann
- Released: 1969
- Recorded: November 11–12, 1968
- Studio: Teldec Studios, Berlin, West Germany
- Genre: Third stream
- Length: 50:23
- Label: Atlantic; SD 1540
- Producer: Nesuhi Ertegun

Herbie Mann chronology
Memphis Underground (1968)	Concerto Grosso in D Blues (1969)	Live at the Whisky a Go Go (1969)

Concerto Grosso in D Blues is an album by flautist Herbie Mann, an example of third stream, the genre merging jazz with classical music. It was recorded in 1968 and released on the Atlantic label.

== Reception ==
Professional ratings
Review scores
Source	Rating
AllMusic	5/5 stars

AllMusic awarded the album 5 stars and its review by Richard Ginell states, "Not only is this rare LP one of Herbie Mann's own favorites, it is one of the most moving classical/jazz fusions ever recorded".

== Track listing ==
1. "Concerto Grosso in D Blues" (Herbie Mann, William S. Fischer) - 28:12
2. "Sense of No Return" (William S. Fischer) - 5:10
3. "Wailing Wall" (Mann) - 9:42
4. "My Little Ones" (Mann) - 7:08
- Recorded at Teldec Studios in Berlin, West Germany on November 11, 1968 (track 1) and November 12, 1968 (tracks 2–4)

== Personnel ==
- Herbie Mann - flute, arranger
- Roy Ayers - vibraphone
- Sonny Sharrock - guitar
- Ron Carter - bass
- Bruno Carr - drums
- Symphonic Orchestra with concertmaster Hans Georg Arlt (track 1)
- Brass Ensemble (track 2)
- Double String Quartet (tracks 3 & 4)
- William S. Fischer - arranger, conductor

Technical

- Gerhard Neumann - recording
- Joel Brodsky - photography
