= The Herbie Mann String Album =

Studio album by Herbie Mann
- Released: 1967
- Recorded: April 5–7, 1966 and September 21, 1967; New York City
- Genre: Jazz
- Length: 38:32
- Label: Atlantic; SD 1490
- Producer: Nesuhi Ertegun

Herbie Mann chronology
The Wailing Dervishes (1967)	The Herbie Mann String Album (1967)	Glory of Love (1967)

The Herbie Mann String Album is an album by American jazz flautist Herbie Mann recorded for the Atlantic label and released in 1967.

== Reception ==
Professional ratings
Review scores
Source	Rating
AllMusic	3/5 stars

AllMusic awarded the album 3 stars.

== Track listing ==
All compositions by Herbie Mann except as indicated

1. "To Sir, With Love" (Mark London, Don Black) - 2:33
2. "Hold Back (Just a Little)" - 3:00
3. "Sports Car" - 3:32
4. "I Get Along Without You Very Well" (Hoagy Carmichael) - 4:01
5. "There Is a Mountain" (Donovan Leitch) - 2:02
6. "Flight of the Bluebird" (Torrie Zito) - 4:18
7. "Yesterday's Kisses" - 4:19
8. "Please Send Me Someone to Love" (Percy Mayfield) - 6:06
9. "It Was a Very Good Year" (Ervin Drake) - 4:34
10. "Gloomy Sunday" (Rezső Seress, Sam M. Lewis) - 4:22
- Recorded in New York City on April 5, 1966 (tracks 3, 4 & 10), April 6, 1966 (tracks 2 & 6), April 7, 1966 (tracks 7–9) and September 21, 1967 (tracks 1 & 5)

== Personnel ==
- Herbie Mann - flute
- Jimmy Owens (tracks 2–4 & 6–10), Clark Terry (tracks 1 & 5) - trumpet, flugelhorn
- Dave Ecker - trombone (tracks 1 & 5)
- Ray Alonge, Julius Watkins - French horn (tracks 1 & 5)
- Gloria Agostini - harp (tracks 2–4, 6 & 10)
- Gene Bertoncini (tracks 2–4, 6 & 10), Bucky Pizzarelli (tracks 1 & 5), Wally Richardson (tracks 1 & 5) - guitar
- Richard Davis - bass (tracks 2–4 & 6–10)
- Bruno Carr (tracks 2 & 6), Mel Lewis (tracks 3, 4 & 7–10), Herbie Lovelle (tracks 1 & 5), Don McDonald (tracks 7–9) - drums
- Ray Barretto (tracks 1 & 5), Carlos "Patato" Valdes (tracks 2–4 & 6–10), Phil Kraus (Tracks 2–4 & 6–10), Ted Sommer (tracks 1 & 5), Orestes Vilato (tracks 1 & 5) - percussion
- Anahid Ajemian, Alfred Brown, Bernard Eichen, Leo Kahn, Leo Kruczek, Charles Libove, Dave Markowitz, Charles McCracken, Marvin Morgenstern, David Nadien, George Ockner, Raoul Poliakin, Max Pollikoff, George Ricci, Aaron Rosand, Alan Shulman, Sylvan Shulman, Tosha Tamaroff, Karen Tuttle, Emanuel Vardi, Jack Zayde - string section
- Arif Mardin (tracks 1 & 5), Torrie Zito (tracks 2–4, 6–10) - arranger, conductor

Technical

- Tom Dowd - engineer
- Haig Adishian - design
- Jerry Schatzberg - photography
