= Flute Soufflé =

Studio album by Herbie Mann and Bobby Jaspar
- Released: 1957
- Recorded: March 21, 1957
- Studio: Van Gelder, Hackensack
- Genre: Jazz
- Length: 36:07
- Label: Prestige; PRLP 7101
- Producer: Ozzie Cadena

Herbie Mann chronology
| Flute Flight (1957) | Flute Soufflé (1957) | Sultry Serenade (1957) |

Flute Soufflé is an album by jazz flautists Herbie Mann and Bobby Jaspar featuring tracks recorded in 1957 for the Prestige label.

== Reception ==
Professional ratings
Review scores
| Source | Rating |
|---|---|
| Allmusic | 4.5/5 stars |
| Disc | 3.5/5 stars |
| The Penguin Guide to Jazz Recordings | 3/4 stars |

Allmusic reviewer Scott Yanow stated: "Herbie Mann was a flutist who occasionally played tenor and Bobby Jaspar a tenor-saxophonist who doubled on flute. They play their normal instruments on the first song. The second song finds them switching back and forth, while the other two are strictly flute features... Several times the two lead voices interact and trade off during this enjoyable performance".

== Track listing ==
All compositions by Herbie Mann, except as indicated.

1. "Tel Aviv" - 14:38
2. "Somewhere Else" (Joe Puma) - 5:55
3. "Let's March" - 7:21
4. "Chasin' the Bird" (Charlie Parker) - 8:13

- Recorded March 21, 1957 at the Van Gelder Studio, Hackensack, New Jersey

== Personnel ==
- Herbie Mann, Bobby Jaspar - flute, tenor saxophone
- Tommy Flanagan - piano
- Joe Puma - guitar
- Wendell Marshall - bass
- Bobby Donaldson - drums
