= Sultry Serenade =

Studio album by Herbie Mann
- Released: 1957
- Recorded: April 1 & 8, 1957
- Studio: Reeves Sound Studios, New York City
- Genre: Jazz
- Length: 39:11
- Label: Riverside; RLP 12-234
- Producer: Orrin Keepnews

Herbie Mann chronology
Flute Soufflé (1957)	Sultry Serenade (1957)	Salute to the Flute (1957)

Sultry Serenade is an album by American jazz flautist Herbie Mann featuring tracks recorded in 1957 for the Riverside label.

== Reception ==
Professional ratings
Review scores
Source	Rating
AllMusic	3/5 stars
The Penguin Guide to Jazz Recordings	3.5/4 stars

Allmusic awarded the album 3 stars, stating: "This is most definitely very fine post-bop modern jazz, with a harmonic twist or turn here and there... This date should not be forgotten as one of Herbie Mann's best."

== Track listing ==
1. "Let Me Tell You" (Herbie Mann) - 4:25
2. "When the Sun Comes Out" (Harold Arlen, Ted Koehler) - 4:55
3. "Professor" (Joe Puma) - 3:43
4. "Lazy Bones" (Hoagy Carmichael, Johnny Mercer) - 7:02
5. "Sultry Serenade" (Tyree Glenn) - 5:01
6. "Little Man, You've Had a Busy Day" (Al Hoffman, Maurice Sigler, Mabel Wayne) - 5:10
7. "One Morning in May" (Carmichael) - 4:03
8. "Swing Till the Girls Come Home" (Oscar Pettiford) - 4:52
- Recorded at Reeves Sound Studios in New York City on April 1, 1957 (tracks 1, 2, 4, 5 & 7) and April 8, 1957 (tracks 3, 6 & 8)

== Personnel ==
- Herbie Mann - flute (tracks 1, 3, 8), alto flute (tracks 2, 5, 6, 7), bass clarinet (track 4)
- Jack Nimitz - baritone saxophone (tracks 1, 4), bass clarinet (tracks 2, 5, 7)
- Urbie Green - trombone (tracks 1, 2, 4, 5 & 7)
- Joe Puma - guitar
- Oscar Pettiford - bass
- Charlie Smith - drums
