= Mann in the Morning =

Studio album by Herbie Mann
- Released: 1958
- Recorded: October 10, 12 & 16, 1956; Stockholm, Sweden
- Genre: Jazz
- Label: Prestige; PRLP 7136

Herbie Mann chronology
Love and the Weather (1956)	Mann in the Morning (1958)	Herbie Mann with the Wessel Ilcken Trio (1956)

Mann in the Morning (also released as Herbie Mann in Sweden) is an album by American jazz flautist Herbie Mann featuring tracks recorded in Stockholm in 1956 and released by the Prestige label.

== Reception ==
Professional ratings
Review scores
Source	Rating
AllMusic	3/5 stars

AllMusic awarded the album 3 stars.

== Track listing ==
All compositions by Herbie Mann except as indicated

1. "Cherry Point" (Neal Hefti) - 6:15
2. "Hurry Burry" - 3:24
3. "Serenata" (Leroy Anderson) - 3:01
4. "Adam's Theme" - 3:29
5. "Early Morning Blues" - 3:17
6. "Nature Boy" (eden ahbez) - 3:24
7. "Ow!" (Henry Glover, Lucky Millinder) - 6:14
8. "Polka Dots and Moonbeams" (Jimmy Van Heusen, Johnny Burke) - 3:48
9. "I Can't Believe That You're in Love with Me" (Jimmy McHugh, Clarence Gaskill) - 3:18
10. "Song for Ruth" - 4:35
- Recorded in Stockholm, Sweden on October 10, 1956 (tracks 2–5 & 8), October 12, 1956 (tracks 1, 9 & 10) and October 16, 1956 (tracks 6 & 7)

== Personnel ==
- Herbie Mann - flute, tenor saxophone
- Bengt-Arne Wallin - trumpet (tracks 1, 6, 7, 9 & 10)
- Åke Persson - trombone (tracks 2–5 & 8)
- Arne Domnérus - alto saxophone (tracks 1, 9 & 10)
- Rolf Blomquist - tenor saxophone (tracks 1, 9 & 10)
- Lennart Jansson - baritone saxophone (tracks 1, 9 & 10)
- Knud Jorgenson (tracks 2–5 & 8), Rune Ofwerman (tracks 6 & 7), Gunnar Svensson (tracks 1, 9 & 10) - piano
- George Riedel - bass
- Joe Harris (tracks 2–5 & 8), Egil Johansen (tracks 1, 6, 7, 9 & 10) - drums
