= Flute Flight =

Studio album by Herbie Mann and Bobby Jaspar
- Released: 1957
- Recorded: March 12 & 21, 1957
- Studio: Van Gelder, Hackensack
- Genre: Jazz
- Length: 36:21
- Label: Prestige; PRLP 7124
- Producer: Ozzie Cadena

Herbie Mann chronology
Herbie Mann with the Wessel Ilcken Trio (1956)	Flute Flight (1957)	Flute Soufflé (1957)

Flute Flight is an album by American and Belgian jazz flautists Herbie Mann and Bobby Jaspar featuring tracks recorded in 1957 for the Prestige label.

== Reception ==
Professional ratings
Review scores
Source	Rating
Allmusic	3/5 stars
The Penguin Guide to Jazz Recordings	4/4 stars

Allmusic reviewer Alex Henderson stated: "Anyone who complains that jazz hasn't had enough flute playing over the years will want to add Flute Flight to his/her collection". The Penguin Guide to Jazz Recordings describes the album as making “a substantial contribution to the evolution of jazz flute.”

== Track listing ==
1. "Tutti Flutie" (Herbie Mann) - 10:10
2. "Bo-Do" (Joe Puma) - 5:54
3. "Flute Bass Blues" (Doug Watkins) - 7:23
4. "Flute Bob" (Bobby Jaspar) - 7:03
5. "Solacium" (Tommy Flanagan) - 5:51
- Recorded at Van Gelder Studio in Hackensack, New Jersey on March 12 (tracks 3–5) and March 21 (tracks 1 & 2), 1957

== Personnel ==
- Herbie Mann - flute (tracks 1 & 2), Bobby Jaspar - flute (tracks 1–5)
- Tommy Flanagan - piano (tracks 1–5)
- Eddie Costa - vibraphone (tracks 3–5)
- Joe Puma - guitar (tracks 1 & 2)
- Wendell Marshall (tracks 1 & 2), Doug Watkins (tracks 3–5),- bass
- Bobby Donaldson - drums
