= Herbie Mann Plays =

Studio album by Herbie Mann
- Released: 1956
- Recorded: December, 1954 and unknown date in 1956; New York City
- Genre: Jazz
- Length: 31:39
- Label: Bethlehem; BCP 58

Herbie Mann chronology
The Herbie Mann-Sam Most Quintet (1955)	Herbie Mann Plays (1956)	Love and the Weather (1956)

Herbie Mann Plays is an album by flautist Herbie Mann on the Bethlehem label featuring seven tracks originally released on the 10 inch LP East Coast Jazz/4 (1954) along with four tracks which were recorded in 1956. The CD reissue added three alternate takes.

== Reception ==
Professional ratings
Review scores
Source	Rating
Allmusic	4/5 stars

Allmusic awarded the album 4 stars noting "This set is a good example of Herbie Mann's early style before he started exploring various types of world musics".

== Track listing ==
All compositions by Herbie Mann except as indicated

1. "Chicken Little" - 3:00
2. "Cuban Love Song" (Dorothy Fields, Jimmy McHugh Herbert Stothart) - 3:16
3. "The Things We Did Last Summer" (Sammy Cahn, Jule Styne) - 4:15
4. "Deep Night" (Charles E. Henderson, Rudy Vallée) - 3:40
5. "Between the Devil and the Deep Blue Sea" (Harold Arlen, Ted Koehler) - 4:05
6. "After Work" - 4:07
7. "Moon Dreams" (Chummy MacGregor, Johnny Mercer) - 3:29
8. "A Spring Morning" - 2:45
9. "Scuffles" - 2:57
10. "The Purple Grotto" - 2:44
11. "My Little Suede Shoes" (Charlie Parker) - 2:43
12. "A Spring Morning" [alternate take] - 2:50 Bonus track on CD reissue
13. "The Purple Grotto" [alternate take] - 2:57 Bonus track on CD reissue
14. "Chicken Little" [alternate take] - 3:11 Bonus track on CD reissue

== Personnel ==
- Herbie Mann - flute
- Joe Puma (tracks 2, 4, 7, 9), Benny Weeks (tracks 1, 3, 5, 6, 8 & 10–14) - guitar
- Keith Hodgson (tracks 1, 3, 5, 6, 8 & 10–14), Whitey Mitchell (tracks 2, 4, 7, 9) - bass
- Lee Rockey (tracks 1, 3, 5, 6, 8 & 10–14), Herb Wasserman (tracks 2, 4, 7, 9) - drums
