= The Herbie Mann–Sam Most Quintet =

The Herbie Mann-Sam Most Quintet

Studio album by Herbie Mann and Sam Most
- Released: 1956
- Recorded: October 12 & 17, 1955; New York City
- Genre: Jazz
- Length: 31:39
- Label: Bethlehem; BCP 40

Herbie Mann chronology
Flamingo (1955)	The Herbie Mann-Sam Most Quintet (1956)	Herbie Mann Plays (1956)

The Herbie Mann–Sam Most Quintet (later reissued as The Mann with the Most) is an album by flautists Herbie Mann and Sam Most on the Bethlehem label which was recorded in 1955.

== Reception ==
Professional ratings
Review scores
Source	Rating
Allmusic	4/5 stars

Allmusic awarded the album 4 stars noting "Most was actually the better known of the two flutists at the time but, while he ended up in the Los Angeles studios, Mann's constant musical curiosity would result in him gaining worldwide fame. Their enjoyable music finds the flutists battling it out to a draw". On All About Jazz Robert Spencer stated "The Herbie Mann-Sam Most Quintet is a 1956 album of eleven genial, high-spirited tracks featuring Mann and Most trading bright, up-tempo, virtually saxophonic flute solos".

== Track listing ==
1. "Fascinating Rhythm" (George Gershwin, Ira Gershwin) - 3:49
2. "Why Do I Love You?" (Oscar Hammerstein II, Jerome Kern) - 3:49
3. "It's Only Sunshine" (Joe Puma) - 2:42
4. "Love Letters" (Edward Heyman, Victor Young) - 2:11
5. "Let's Get Away from It All" (Tom Adair, Matt Dennis) - 3:22
6. "Flying Home" (Benny Goodman, Lionel Hampton) - 3:21
7. "I'll Remember April" (Gene de Paul, Patricia Johnston, Don Raye) - 4:59
8. "Empathy" (Sam Most) - 3:19
9. "It Might as Well Be Spring" (Hammerstein, Richard Rodgers) - 3:13
10. "Just One of Those Things" (Cole Porter) - 3:56
11. "Seven Come Eleven" (Charlie Christian, Goodman) - 4:54

== Personnel ==
- Herbie Mann, Sam Most - flute
- Joe Puma - guitar
- Jimmy Gannon - bass
- Lee Kleinman - drums
