= Joel Brodsky =

American photographer (1939–2007)

- Born: Joel Lee Brodsky; October 7, 1939; Brooklyn, New York
- Died: March 1, 2007 (aged 67); Stamford, Connecticut
- Education: Syracuse University
- Occupation: Photographer

Joel Lee Brodsky (October 7, 1939 – March 1, 2007) was an American photographer, best known for his photography of musicians, particularly his iconic "Young Lion" photographs of Jim Morrison. In his lifetime, he is credited with photographing over 400 album covers.

Brodsky was born in Brooklyn, New York and graduated from Syracuse University in 1960. While working at a camera store in Brooklyn, he began a side career of photography and opened his own studio in 1964.

Later Brodsky left the rock 'n' roll photography and focused on commercial work, shooting advertising campaigns for Revlon, Avon, DuPont and other companies. Since the beginning of the new century, there has been a worldwide revival of interest in Brodsky's rock 'n' roll pictures, with several exhibitions across the USA and in Europe. His artwork has been shown by the Govinda Gallery in Washington, DC, the Morrison Hotel Gallery, the Stax Museum in Memphis, San Francisco Art Exchange, and the Snap Galleries in London, UK.

== Partial discography ==
- The Doors, The Doors (1967)
- Strange Days, The Doors (1967)
- Astral Weeks, Van Morrison (1968)
- David Ackles, David Ackles (1968)
- Doc Watson in Nashville: Good Deal!, Doc Watson (1968)
- Nazz, Nazz (1968)
- The Clown Died in Marvin Gardens, Beacon Street Union (1968)
- The Soft Parade, The Doors (1969)
- Kick Out the Jams, MC5 (1969)
- The Stooges, The Stooges (1969)
- Mr. Blues Plays Lady Soul, Hank Crawford (1969)
- Memphis Underground, Herbie Mann (1969)
- Muscle Shoals Nitty Gritty, Herbie Mann (1970)
- McLemore Avenue, Booker T and the MG's (1970)
- In the Beginning (Circa 1960), The Beatles featuring Tony Sheridan (1970)
- The Isaac Hayes Movement, Isaac Hayes (1970)
- ...To Be Continued, Isaac Hayes (1970)
- Free Your Mind... and Your Ass Will Follow, Funkadelic (1970)
- Air, Air (1971)
- Black Moses, Isaac Hayes (1971)
- Push Push, Herbie Mann (1971)
- Carly Simon, Carly Simon (1971)
- Maggot Brain, Funkadelic (1971)
- What Color Is Love, Terry Callier (1972)
- Pleasure, Ohio Players (1972)
- Pain, Ohio Players (1972)
- Tell Me This Is a Dream, The Delfonics (1972)
- Ecstasy, Ohio Players (1973)
- Kiss, Kiss (1974)
- Small Change, Tom Waits (1976)
- Phyllis Hyman, Phyllis Hyman (1977)
- Greatest Hits, The Doors (1980)
