= Push Push (Herbie Mann album) =

Studio album by Herbie Mann
- Released: July 1, 1971
- Genres: Crossover jazz, jazz fusion, soul jazz, jazz-funk, rhythm and blues
- Length: 43:22
- Label: Atlantic/Cotillion/Embryo
- Producer: Arif Mardin

Herbie Mann chronology
Memphis Two-Step (1971)	Push Push (1971)	Mississippi Gambler (1972)

Professional ratings
Review scores
Source	Rating
AllMusic	4/5 stars
Billboard	positive
The Rolling Stone Jazz Record Guide	4/5 stars

Push Push is a 1971 instrumental album by jazz flutist Herbie Mann, on his Embryo Records label with Atlantic, which features rock guitarist Duane Allman. The record explored a range of popular genres, such as R&B, rock and funk music to create what AllMusic calls a "generally appealing, melodic and danceable" album with an "impressive crew of musicians".

== Background and recording ==
In 1969, Mann received permission from Atlantic, the label to which he was then signed, to form his own label, which he called Embryo. Push Push was among his first albums to be released on his label.

== Chart performance ==
On the Billboard Top LPs chart dated October 30, 1971, Push Push debuted at number 178. It was deemed a "Star Performer" by the magazine, meaning it had one of the greatest increases in sales over the preceding week. On the chart dated December 4, it attained its peak of 119. It also charted on the Billboard Top R&B Albums chart, where it peaked at number 21 on the same date.

== Track listing ==
1. "Push Push" (Herbie Mann) — 9:55
2. "What's Going On" (Renaldo Benson, Alfred Cleveland, Marvin Gaye) — 4:12
3. "Spirit in the Dark" (Aretha Franklin) — 9:25
4. "Man's Hope" (Traditional, arrangement by Herbie Mann, based on "Hatikvah") — 6:54
5. "If" (David Gates) — 4:29
6. "Never Can Say Goodbye" (Clifton Davis) — 3:32
7. "What'd I Say" (Ray Charles) — 4:55
8. "Funky Nassau" (Ray Munnings, Tyrone Fitzgerald) (CD bonus track) — 4:55

== Jacket design and notes ==
gatefold image

The original cover, designed by Paula Bisacca with photography by Joel Brodsky, features an apparently nude Mann from the waist up, holding a flute resting on his shoulder. The album had the second "PUSH" die cut out, with the gatefold featuring a textured (flocked) duotone orange and black print of two torsos engaged in missionary style intercourse (no explicit content). The die cut reveals a small, unrecognizable portion of the print. The album's images generated controversy at the time. Later printings excluded the gatefold print, or eliminated the gatefold format entirely. Liner notes by Mann include: "P.S., Marvin Gaye's album What's Going On is the best album of the year!"

== Personnel ==
Adapted from AllMusic

- Duane Allman - guitar, solos
- Cornell Dupree - guitar (1, 2, 6)
- David Spinozza - guitar (incorrectly credited as David Spinoza) (3–5, 7), solo on "Man's Hope"
- Gene Bianco - harp (1, 4)
- Richard Tee - electric piano, piano (1, 2, 4, 6), organ (1, 2, 4)
- Chuck Rainey - bass (1, 2, 4)
- Jerry Jemmott - bass (3, 7)
- Donald "Duck" Dunn - bass (4, 5)
- Bernard Purdie - drums (1–3, 6, 7)
- Al Jackson, Jr. - drums (4, 5)
- Ralph MacDonald - percussion
- Arif Mardin - producer
- Jimmy Douglass - engineer

== Charts ==
Chart (1971)	Peak position
US Billboard 200	119
US Top R&B/Hip-Hop Albums (Billboard)	21

== See also ==
- Herbie Mann discography
