= Windows Opened =

Studio album by Herbie Mann
- Released: 1968
- Recorded: February 8 and April 2, 1968; New York City
- Genre: Jazz
- Length: 36:55
- Label: Atlantic; SD 1507
- Producer: Joel Dorn, Arif Mardin

Herbie Mann chronology
Glory of Love (1967)	Windows Opened (1968)	The Inspiration I Feel (1968)

Windows Opened is an album by flautist Herbie Mann recorded in 1968 and released on the Atlantic label.

== Reception ==
Professional ratings
Review scores
Source	Rating
Allmusic	4/5 stars

The Allmusic site awarded the album 4 stars stating "Recorded with Herbie Mann's working band at the time, Windows Opened captures the quintet tackling a mixed set of contemporary jazz and pop tunes. ...Although this is not one of the essential recordings in Mann's catalog, it features excellent playing throughout, with an amazing collection of talent".

== Track listing ==
1. "There Is a Mountain" (Donovan Leitch) - 6:08
2. "If I Were a Carpenter" (Tim Hardin) - 5:41
3. "Paper Man" (Charles Tolliver) - 6:47
4. "Footprints" (Wayne Shorter) - 8:27
5. "By the Time I Get to Phoenix" (Jimmy Webb) - 2:22
6. "Windows Opened" (Roy Ayers) - 7:30
- Recorded in New York City on February 8, 1968 (tracks 1 & 3–5) and April 2, 1968 (tracks 2 & 3)

== Personnel ==
- Herbie Mann - flute
- Roy Ayers - vibraphone
- Sonny Sharrock - guitar
- Miroslav Vitouš - bass
- Bruno Carr - drums

Technical

- Adrian Barber - engineer
- Talât Sait Halman - poetry consultant
- Stanislaw Zagórski - sculpture and album design
- Chuck Stewart - photography
