= Impressions of the Middle East =

Studio album by Herbie Mann
- Released: 1967
- Recorded: March 7 & 22, April 5 and November 9, 1966
- Genre: Ethno jazz, crossover jazz
- Length: 44:11
- Label: Atlantic; SD 1475
- Producer: Nesuhi Ertegun and Arif Mardin

Herbie Mann chronology
New Mann at Newport (1966)	Impressions of the Middle East (1967)	A Mann & A Woman (1967)

Impressions of the Middle East is an album by American jazz flautist Herbie Mann recorded for the Atlantic label and released in 1967.

== Reception ==
Professional ratings
Review scores
Source	Rating
AllMusic	4.5/5 stars

AllMusic awarded the album 4½ stars.

== Track listing ==
All compositions by Herbie Mann except as indicated

1. "Turkish Coffee" - 5:00
2. "Incense" - 7:18
3. "Odalisque" (Arif Mardin) - 7:40
4. "Do Wah Diddy Diddy" (Ellie Greenwich, Jeff Barry) - 2:36
5. "Uskudar" (Traditional; arranged by Arif Mardin) - 3:37
6. "The Oud and the Pussycat" - 5:03
7. "Yavuz" (Traditional; arranged by Arif Mardin) - 4:36
8. "Dance of the Semites" - 4:27
9. "Eli Eli" (Traditional; arranged by Torrie Zito) - 3:56
- Recorded in New York City on March 7, 1966 (tracks 5, 7 & 8), March 22, 1966 (tracks 4 & 6), April 5, 1966 (track 9) and November 9, 1966 (tracks 1–3)

== Personnel ==
- Herbie Mann - flutes
- Jimmy Owens - trumpet, flugelhorn (tracks 4–9)
- Joseph Orange, Julian Priester - trombone (tracks 4 & 6)
- Hachig Thomas Kazarian - clarinet (tracks 4–8)
- Mohammed Elakkad - zither (tracks 4–8)
- Chick Ganimian - oud (tracks 1–8)
- Gloria Agostini - harp (track 9)
- Roy Ayers - vibraphone (tracks 1–3)
- Attila Zoller - guitar (tracks 4 & 6)
- Richard Davis (track 9), Reggie Workman (tracks 4–8) - bass
- Bruno Carr (tracks 1–8), Mel Lewis (track 9) - drums
- Moulay "Ali" Hafid (tracks 5, 7 & 8), Robert Marashlian (tracks 5, 7 & 8), Carlos "Patato" Valdes (tracks 1–4, 6 & 9), Phil Kraus (track 9), Hachig Thomas Kazarian (tracks 1–3), Geraldine Swee (tracks 1–3) - percussion
- Aaron Rosand, Alan Shulman, Alfred Brown, Anahid Ajemian, Bernard Eichen, Charles Libove, Charles McCracken, David Mankowitz, David Nadien, Emanuel Vardi, George Ockner, George Ricci, Jack Zayde, Karen Tuttle, Leo Kahn, Leo Kruczek, Marvin Morgenstern, Max Pollikoff, Raoul Poliakin, Sylvan Shulman, Tosha Samaroff - strings (track 9)
- Arif Mardin, Torrie Zito - arranger, conductor

Technical

- Bruce Tergesen, Phil Iehle, Tom Dowd - engineer
- Marvin Israel - design
