= Live at the Whisky a Go Go (Herbie Mann album) =

Live album by Herbie Mann
- Released: 1969
- Recorded: June 7, 1969
- Venue: Whisky a Go Go, West Hollywood, CA
- Genre: Jazz
- Length: 29:13
- Label: Atlantic; SD 1536
- Producer: Nesuhi Ertegun

Herbie Mann chronology
Concerto Grosso in D Blues (1968)	Live at the Whisky a Go Go (1969)	Stone Flute (1970)

Live at the Whisky a Go Go is a live album by flautist Herbie Mann recorded in 1969 and released on the Atlantic label.

== Reception ==
Professional ratings
Review scores
Source	Rating
Allmusic	4/5 stars

The Allmusic site awarded the album 4 stars calling it "one of Herbie Mann's better sets of the era".

== Track listing ==
1. "Ooh Baby" (Chris Hills, Columbus Baker) - 15:05
2. "Philly Dog" (Rufus Thomas) - 14:04

== Personnel ==
- Herbie Mann - flute
- Steve Marcus - tenor saxophone
- Roy Ayers - vibraphone
- Sonny Sharrock - guitar
- Miroslav Vitouš - bass
- Bruno Carr - drums

Technical

- Bill Halverson - recording engineer
- Larry Browne - photography
