= Timbale =

Timbale may refer to:

- Timpani, kettledrums, spelled "timbale" in some languages
- Timbale (food), a kind of dish of various ingredients baked in a round mold

== See also ==
- Timbales or timbal, a Cuban and Latin American percussion instrument
- Timbau or timbal, a Brazilian drum
