= Stone Flute =

Studio album by Herbie Mann
- Released: 1970
- Recorded: March 18 & 20 and August 8, 1969
- Studios: Atlantic, New York City; A & R, New York City
- Genre: Crossover Jazz
- Length: 40:33
- Labels: Embryo; SD 520
- Producer: Herbie Mann

Herbie Mann chronology
Live at the Whisky a Go Go (1969)	Stone Flute (1970)	Muscle Shoals Nitty Gritty (1969)

Stone Flute is an album by flautist Herbie Mann recorded in 1969 and becoming the first release on Mann's Embryo label.

== Reception ==
Professional ratings
Review scores
Source	Rating
Allmusic	4/5 stars
The Penguin Guide to Jazz Recordings	1.5/4 stars

The Allmusic site awarded the album 4 stars stating "This is a totally atypical Herbie Mann recording, but one which rewards repeated listening".

== Track listing ==
All compositions by Herbie Mann except as indicated

1. "In Tangier/Paradise Beach" (David Mills/Herbie Mann) - 10:35
2. "Flying" (George Harrison, John Lennon, Paul McCartney, Ringo Starr) - 5:21
3. "Don't You Know The Way (How I Feel About You)" - 5:17
4. "Miss Free Spirit" - 12:40
5. "Waltz for My Son" - 4:23
6. "Pendulum" (William Fischer) - 2:35
- Recorded in New York City at Atlantic Recording Studios on March 18 (track 2) and March 20 (tracks 1 & 6) and at A&R Recording Studios on August 8 (tracks 3–5), 1969

== Personnel ==
- Herbie Mann - flute
- Roy Ayers - vibraphone
- Sonny Sharrock - guitar
- Ron Carter (tracks 1, 2 & 6), Miroslav Vitouš (tracks 3–5) - bass
- Bruno Carr (tracks 1, 2 & 6), Mickey Roker (tracks 3–5) - drums
- Peter Dimitriades (tracks 3–5), Emanuel Green (tracks 1, 2 & 6), Gene Orloff (tracks 1, 2 & 6) - violin
- Selwart Clarke - violin, viola
- Al Brown - viola (tracks 3–5)
- Kermit Moore (tracks 3–5), George Ricci (tracks 1, 2 & 6) - cello
- William Fischer - arranger
