= Air (jazz rock band) =

American jazz rock band

- Genres: Jazz rock
- Years active: 1968–1983
- Labels: Embryo
- Members: Tom Coppola; Googie Coppola; John Siegler; Mark Rosengarden

Air was an American jazz rock band mainly active in the late 1960s and early 1970s.

== History ==
The band's self-titled debut album was released in 1971 by Embryo Records, which had been founded by Herbie Mann in 1969. The four core band members were Tom Coppola (Hammond organ, Allen organ, piano), John Siegler (bass), Mark Rosengarden (drums), and Googie Coppola (piano, vocals). The album also featured Randy Brecker on trumpet, Michael Brecker on saxophone, Barry Rogers on trombone, David Earle Johnson on congas and timbales, Robert Kogel on guitar, Bob Rosengarden on vibes, plus Jan Hammer and Herbie Mann on percussion. Herbie Mann was also the producer.

Tom and Googie Coppola were both influenced by jazz and fusion, including time signature changes. They answered an advert in The Village Voice placed by Moogy Klingman, who introduced them to Siegler and Rosengarden. The group rehearsed in Great Neck, Long Island, working on songs written by Googie. The group was spotted by Mann at a gig in the Village Gate, who wanted them to be his backing band. By the time their debut album was released in 1971, family commitments led to the group splitting up. Thereafter Tom and Googie Coppola played a few times at the Montreux Jazz Festival with the Atlantic All-Stars.

According to its writer, Moogy Klingman, the song "Sister Bessie" is about "...a nun, who took LSD after falling in love with a hippie, and then made love to him, deciding she would leave the church and the convent. Apparently, the hippie had different ideas and left town quickly. This song is about what he might say to her about his hasty exit, if he said anything at all.”

A limited edition album was released by the Be With label in 2016.

== Air (album) ==
Air track listing
No.	Title	Length
1.	"Realize"	3:48
2.	"Mr. Man"	3:13
3.	"Baby I Don't Know Where Love"	4:32
4.	"Martin"	2:38
5.	"In Our Time"	5:10
6.	"Man Is Free"	4:26
7.	"Sister Bessie"	2:34
8.	"Lipstick"	4:38
9.	"Man's Got Style"	2:56
10.	"Jail Cell"	5:12
11.	"I Wish I Knew How It Would Feel to Be Free"	3:35
Total length:		42:48
