= The Beat Goes On (Herbie Mann album) =

Studio album by Herbie Mann
- Released: 1967
- Recorded: April 6, May 6 & 8, 1964, September 29, December 15–16, 1966 and March 16, 1967; NYC
- Genre: Soul jazz Crossover jazz Latin jazz
- Length: 31:19
- Label: Atlantic; SD 1483
- Producer: Nesuhi Ertegun and Arif Mardin

Herbie Mann chronology
A Mann & A Woman (1966)	The Beat Goes On (1967)	The Wailing Dervishes (1967)

The Beat Goes On is an album by American jazz flautist Herbie Mann released on the Atlantic label in 1967. The album features tracks from seven separate sessions recorded in 1964, 1966 and 1967.

== Reception ==
Professional ratings
Review scores
Source	Rating
Allmusic	2/5 stars

Allmusic noted "The Beat Goes On is a generally funky, groove-oriented soul-jazz effort with strong Latin leanings. ...Jazz purists hated this release, but let them say what they will – this LP is full of highly infectious grooves and makes a great party album".

== Track listing ==
1. "No Matter What Shape" (Granville "Sascha" Burland) – 3:25
2. "More Rice Than Peas, Please" (Herbie Mann) – 3:30
3. "Hey Ho" (Herbie Hancock) – 2:45
4. "The Honeydripper" (Joe Liggins) – 2:45
5. "The Beat Goes On" (Sonny Bono) – 2:50
6. "Swingin' Shepherd Blues" (Kenny Jacobson, Moe Koffman, Rhoda Roberts) – 3:05
7. "West African High Life" (Mann) – 2:40
8. "Dream Garden" (Dave Pike) – 4:37
9. "Soul Montuno" (René Hernández) – 2:58
10. "Is Paris Burning?" (Maurice Jarre) – 2:37
- Recorded in New York City on April 6, 1964 (track 8), May 6, 1964 (track 9), May 8, 1964 (track 7), September 29, 1966 (tracks 6 & 10), December 15, 1966 (track 4), December 16, 1966 (tracks 1–3) and March 16, 1967 (track 5)

== Personnel ==
Musicians

- Herbie Mann – flute. alto flute on "Dream Garden" – with various ensembles including:
- Clark Terry – trumpet
- King Curtis – tenor saxophone
- Roy Ayers, Dave Pike – vibraphone
- Don Friedman, Jimmy Wisner, Joe Zawinul – piano
- Attila Zoller – guitar
- Jack Six, Reggie Workman – bass
- Bruno Carr, Bobby Thomas – drums
- Willie Bobo – timbales
- Carlos "Patato" Valdes – congas, percussion
- Tamiko Jones – vocals
- Gene Orloff, Jimmy Wisner – arranger, conductor

Production

- Nesuhi Ertegun – supervisor
- Arif Mardin – supervisor
- Adrian Barber – recording engineer
- Phil Iehle – recording engineer
- Tom Dowd – recording engineer
- Dick Luppi – cover illustration
