= Embryo Records =

American jazz and rock record label (1969–1977)

- Parent company: Atlantic Records
- Founded: 1969
- Founder: Herbie Mann
- Defunct: 1977
- Status: Defunct
- Genre: Jazz, rock
- Country of origin: U.S.

Embryo Record label from Push Push

Embryo Records was a jazz and rock record label founded by Herbie Mann as a division of Atlantic Records, itself distributed by the Atlantic subsidiary Cotillion Records. The label released albums in the years 1969 through 1977.

== Discography ==
Catalog #	Album	Artist	Year
SD520	Stone Flute	Herbie Mann	1970
SD521	Uptown Conversation	Ron Carter	1970
SD522	Brute Force	Brute Force	1970
SD523	Gypsy Cry	Attila Zoller	1970
SD524	Infinite Search	Miroslav Vitous	1969
SD525	Inside an Hour Glass	Arnie Lawrence and Children of All Ages	1970
SD526	Muscle Shoals Nitty Gritty	Herbie Mann	1970
SD527	The Fifth Word	Jerry Novac (A/K/A Novac Noury)	1970
SD528	Just Guitar	Sandy Nassan	1970
SD529	Circles	William S. Fischer	1971
SD530	Live at the Frankfurt Jazz Festival	Phil Woods and his European Rhythm Machine	1971
SD531	Memphis Two-Step	Herbie Mann	1971
SD532	Push Push	Herbie Mann	1971
SD533	'71 (Unreleased)	Herbie Mann	1971
SD535	First Serve	Danny Toan	1977
SD536	Up	Morrissey–Mullen	1977
SD730	The Floating Opera	The Floating Opera	1971
SD731	Pepper's Pow Wow	Jim Pepper	1971
SD732	Zero Time	Tonto's Expanding Head Band	1971
SD733	Air	Air	1971
SD734	Comin' Outta the Ghetto	Chris Hills & Everything Is Everything	1971

== See also ==
- Herbie Mann discography
