= The Wailing Dervishes =

Live album by Herbie Mann
- Released: March 1968
- Recorded: June 3, 1967
- Venue: Village Theatre, New York City
- Genre: Crossover jazz, ethno jazz
- Length: 41:35
- Label: Atlantic; SD 1497
- Producer: Nesuhi Ertegun

Herbie Mann chronology
The Beat Goes On (1967)	The Wailing Dervishes (1968)	The Herbie Mann String Album (1967)

The Wailing Dervishes is a live album by American jazz flautist Herbie Mann recorded at the Village Theatre in New York City for the Atlantic label and released in 1967.

== Reception ==
Professional ratings
Review scores
Source	Rating
AllMusic	4.5/5 stars

AllMusic awarded the album 4½ stars stating "The Wailing Dervishes chases after a fusion that is extremely rare even today - jazz and the Middle East. Believe it or not, it works -- and there are no commercial or ethnic compromises. ...Recorded live, this LP is definitely worth hunting for if you want to hear something really different.

== Track listing ==
All compositions by Herbie Mann except as indicated

1. "The Wailing Dervishes" - 8:30
2. "Norwegian Wood" (John Lennon, Paul McCartney) - 10:38
3. "Flute Bag" (Rufus Harley) - 3:55
4. "In the Medina" - 9:30
5. "Armenian Lullaby" (Chick Ganimian) - 7:35

== Personnel ==
- Herbie Mann - flute
- Hachig Thomas Kazarian - clarinet (tracks 2 & 5)
- Rufus Harley - bagpipes (track 3)
- Roy Ayers - vibraphone (tracks 1–4)
- Esber Köprücü - zither (tracks 2 & 5)
- Chick Ganimian - oud (tracks 1, 2, 4 & 5)
- Oliver Collins - piano (track 3)
- James Glenn (track 3), Reggie Workman (tracks 1, 2 & 4) - bass
- Steve Knight - electric bass (tracks 2 & 5)
- Billy Abner (track 3), Bruno Carr (tracks 1, 2 & 4) - drums
- Moulay "Ali" Hafid - dümbek (tracks 1, 2, 4 & 5)

Technical

- Bruce Tergesen, Phil Iehle - engineer
- Marvin Israel - design
