= Memphis Underground =

Studio album by Herbie Mann
- Released: April 1969
- Studio: American Sound, Memphis
- Genre: Crossover jazz, soul jazz
- Label: Atlantic
- Producer: Tom Dowd

Herbie Mann chronology
The Inspiration I Feel (1968)	Memphis Underground (1969)	Concerto Grosso in D Blues (1969)

Professional ratings
Review scores
Source	Rating
Allmusic	3/5 stars
Rolling Stone	favorable
The Rolling Stone Jazz Record Guide	4/5 stars
The Penguin Guide to Jazz Recordings	3/4 stars

Memphis Underground is a 1969 album by jazz flutist Herbie Mann, that fuses the genres of jazz and rhythm and blues (R&B). While Mann and the other principal soloists (Roy Ayers, Larry Coryell and Sonny Sharrock) were leading jazz musicians, the album was recorded in Chips Moman's American Sound Studio in Memphis, a studio used by many well-known R&B and pop artists. The rhythm section was the house band at American Studios. The recording was engineered and produced by Tom Dowd.

Three of the five songs on the album were covers of songs originally released by soul artists. "Hold On, I'm Comin'" (by Sam & Dave), who recorded at Stax records (with the Stax rhythm section), and "Chain of Fools" (by Aretha Franklin) who recorded that song with the classic Muscle Shoals Rhythm Section at FAME Studios in Muscle Shoals, Alabama.

Two members of the rhythm section on Franklin's recording (Gene Chrisman and Tommy Cogbill) perform on Memphis Underground.

A third song, "New Orleans", was also released by R&B artist (Gary U.S. Bonds), who recorded in Virginia.

So though the only one song was certifiably of Memphis vintage, the conglomeration of young New York jazz musicians with one of the most storied Southern rhythm sections proved to be the catalyst for creating strong, fresh music that sounds like neither Memphis soul nor New York jazz. This unique sound appealed to a large audience.

== Reception ==
The record is one of the best-selling Jazz albums of all time. Rolling Stone said "Memphis Underground is a piece of musical alchemy, a marvelously intricate combination of the "Memphis sound" and jazz lyricism".

Memphis Underground was a favorite album of writer Hunter S. Thompson, who mentions it positively in several chapters of his book Fear and Loathing on the Campaign Trail. In the article The Battle of Aspen, Thompson states that his "Freak Power" campaign used Mann's recording of "Battle Hymn of the Republic" as the background music for their commercials.

Another writer, the British author Stewart Home, as a tribute to this Mann album, titled his 2007 novel (some call it an antinovel) Memphis Underground. In the novel, Home makes multiple references to soul, northern soul and jazz soul music.

== Track listing ==
1. "Memphis Underground" (Herbie Mann) — 7:07
2. "New Orleans" (Frank Guida, Joseph Royster) — 2:07
3. "Hold On, I'm Comin'" (Isaac Hayes, David Porter) — 8:52
4. "Chain of Fools" (Don Covay) — 10:42
5. "Battle Hymn of the Republic" (Traditional, arranged by Herbie Mann) — 7:12

== Personnel ==
- Herbie Mann – flute
- Reggie Young – guitar
- Bobby Emmons – organ
- Bobby Wood – electric and acoustic piano
- Gene Chrisman – drums
- Tommy Cogbill or Mike Leech - Fender bass (individual tracks not specified)

Also appearing on selected tracks:

- Roy Ayers – vibes, conga on "Battle Hymn of the Republic" and “Memphis Underground.”
- Larry Coryell – guitar
- Sonny Sharrock – guitar
- Miroslav Vitouš - Fender bass on "Hold On, I'm Comin'"

Technical

- Tom Dowd – producer and engineer
- Joel Brodsky – cover photograph
- William Albert Allard – back liner photograph

== Renditions ==
In 1993, flutist Alexander Zonjic covered the title track on his album Passion.

== See also ==
- 1969 in music
- Herbie Mann discography
