= A Mann & a Woman =

Studio album by Herbie Mann and Tamiko Jones
- Released: 1967
- Recorded: September 27, November 23 and December 28, 1966; NYC
- Genre: Jazz
- Length: 28:12
- Label: Atlantic; SD 8141
- Producer: Ahmet Ertegun

Herbie Mann chronology
Impressions of the Middle East (1967)	A Mann & a Woman (1967)	The Beat Goes On (1967)

A Mann & a Woman is an album by American jazz flautist Herbie Mann and vocalist Tamiko Jones released on the Atlantic label in 1967.

== Reception ==
Professional ratings
Review scores
Source	Rating
AllMusic	4/5 stars

AllMusic rated the album 4 stars.

== Track listing ==
1. "A Man and a Woman" (Francis Lai, Pierre Barouh, Jerry Keller) – 2:32
2. "Day Tripper" (John Lennon, Paul McCartney) – 2:37
3. "Come Back to Me" (Burton Lane, Alan Jay Lerner) – 2:48
4. "Little Boat" (Roberto Menescal, Rolando Boscoli, Buddy Kaye) – 2:36
5. "It's Time That You Settled Down" (Neil Sheppard, Ray Fox) – 2:13
6. "A Good Thing (Is Hard to Come By)" (Tamiko Jones) – 2:17
7. "1-2-3" (Len Barry, John Madara, Dave White) – 2:17
8. "Only Yesterday" (Jimmy Wisner) – 2:36
9. "Sunny" (Bobby Hebb) – 2:27
10. "How Insensitive" (Antônio Carlos Jobim, Vinicius de Moraes, Norman Gimbel) – 2:44
11. "Sidewinder" (Lee Morgan) – 3:05
- Recorded in New York City on September 27 (tracks 1, 5, 7 & 11), November 23 (tracks 2, 3 & 6) and December 28 (tracks 4 & 8–10), 1966

== Personnel ==
- Herbie Mann – flute
- Tamiko Jones – vocals – with various ensembles including:
- Roy Ayers, Gary Burton – vibraphone
- Joe Zawinul – piano
- Victor Gaskin, Reggie Workman – bass
- Everett Barksdale – electric bass
- Bruno Carr, Roy McCurdy – drums
- Carlos "Patato" Valdes – congas, percussion
- Tamiko Jones – vocals
- Melba Liston (tracks 9 & 10), Jimmy Wisner (tracks 1, 4, 5, 7, 8 & 11), Joe Zawinul (tracks 2, 3 & 6) – arranger

Technical

- Tom Dowd – recording engineer
- Haig Adishian – cover design
- Jerry Czember – cover illustration
