= Herbie Mann =

American jazz flutist (1930–2003)

- Mann c. 1980

Background information
- Born: Herbert Jay Solomon; April 16, 1930; Brooklyn, New York City, U.S.
- Died: July 1, 2003 (aged 73) Pecos, New Mexico, U.S.
- Genres: Jazz; bossa nova; disco; world music
- Occupations: Musician; record label executive
- Instruments: Flute; saxophone; bass clarinet
- Works: Herbie Mann discography
- Years active: 1953–2003
- Labels: Atlantic; Cotillion; Embryo; Kokopelli
- Website: www.herbiemannmusic.com (inactive)

Herbert Jay Solomon (April 16, 1930 – July 1, 2003), known by his stage name Herbie Mann, was an American jazz flute player and important early practitioner of world music. Early in his career, he also played tenor saxophone and clarinet (including bass clarinet), but Mann was among the first jazz musicians to specialize on the flute. His most popular single was "Hi-Jack", which was a Billboard No. 1 dance hit for three weeks in 1975.

Mann emphasized the groove approach in his music. Mann felt that from his repertoire, the "epitome of a groove record" was Memphis Underground or Push Push, because the "rhythm section locked all in one perception."

== Early life, family and education ==
Herbie Mann was born in Brooklyn, New York, New York, to Jewish parents Harry C. Solomon (May 30, 1902 – May 31, 1980), who was of Russian descent, and Ruth Rose Solomon (née Brecher) (July 4, 1905 – November 11, 2004), of Romanian descent who was born in Bukovina, Austria-Hungary but immigrated to the United States with her family at the age of 6. Both of his parents were dancers and singers, as well as dance instructors later in life.

Mann started studying the clarinet when he was in grade school. He attended Lincoln High School in Brighton Beach, Brooklyn. By the time he graduated, he had begun to take saxophone and flute lessons.

== Career ==
His first professional performance was playing the Catskills resorts at age 15. Following high school graduation, he served four years in the U.S. Army and for most of his tour was stationed in Italy with the 98th Army Band. After discharge, Mann worked with accordianist Mat Mathews and then joined Pete Rugolo's band. After Rugolo disbanded, Mann formed a quartet with guitarist Benny Weeks, bassist Keith Hodgson and drummer Lee Rockey and recorded his first album for Bethlehem Records in December of 1954. In the 1950s Mann was primarily a bop flutist, playing in combos with artists such as Phil Woods, Sam Most, Bobby Jaspar and Buddy Collette, occasionally playing bass clarinet, tenor saxophone and solo flute. In 1957, he won the Down Beat jazz magazine poll for best flutist, winning again in 1958, 1959 and 1960.

Mann was an early pioneer of the fusion of jazz and world music. In 1959, following a US State Department-sponsored tour of Africa, he recorded Flautista!, an album of Afro-Cuban jazz. In 1961, Mann toured Brazil, returning to the US to record with Brazilian musicians, including Antonio Carlos Jobim and guitarist Baden Powell. These albums helped popularize bossa nova in the US and Europe. He often worked with Brazilian themes. In the mid-1960s Mann hired a young Chick Corea to play in some of his bands. In the late 1970s and early 1980s Mann played duets at New York City's The Bottom Line and Village Gate clubs, with Sarod virtuoso Vasant Rai.

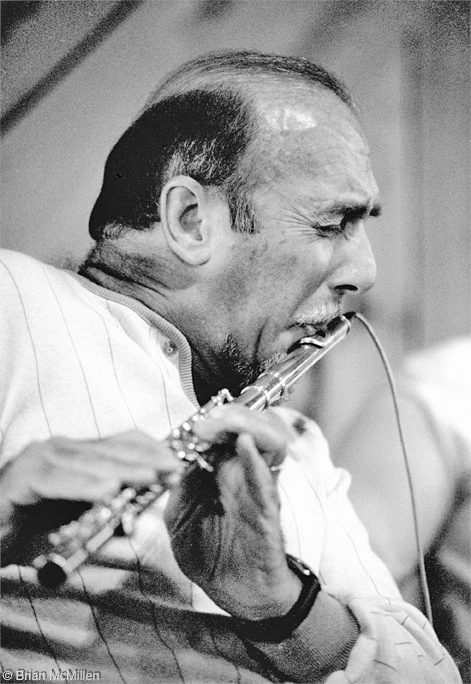
Herbie Mann at Bach Dancing & Dynamite Society, Half Moon Bay CA 9/5/82

Following the 1969 hit album Memphis Underground, a number of smooth jazz records influenced by Southern soul, blues rock, reggae, funk and disco elicited criticism from jazz purists but allowed Mann to remain active during a period of declining interest in jazz. The musicians on these recordings are some of the best-known session players in soul and jazz, including singer Cissy Houston, guitarists Duane Allman, Larry Coryell, and Sonny Sharrock, bassists Donald "Duck" Dunn, Chuck Rainey, and Miroslav Vitous, and drummers Al Jackson, Jr. and Bernard Purdie. In this period Mann had a number of pop hits — rare for a jazz musician. According to a 1998 interview Mann had made at least 25 albums that were on the Billboard 200 pop charts, success denied most of his jazz peers."

Mann provided the music for the 1978 National Film Board of Canada animated short Afterlife, by Ishu Patel.

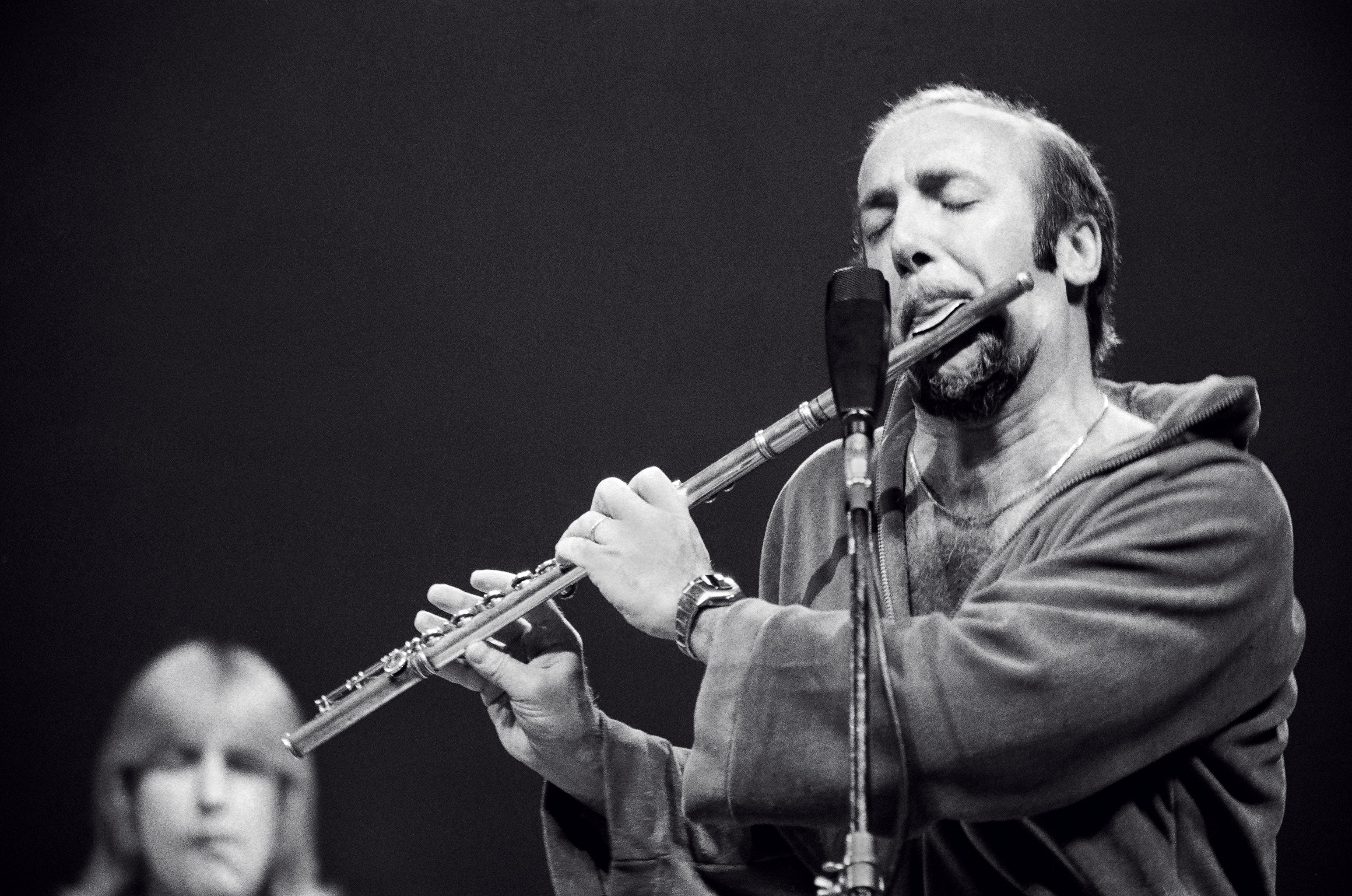
Herbie Mann and Will Lee (1975)

In the early 1970s, he founded his own label, Embryo Records, distributed by Cotillion Records, a division of Atlantic Records. Embryo produced jazz albums, such as Ron Carter's Uptown Conversation (1970); Miroslav Vitous' first solo album, Infinite Search (1969); Phil Woods and his European Rhythm Machine at the Frankfurt Jazz Festival (1971); and Dick Morrissey and Jim Mullen's Up (1976), which featured the Average White Band as a rhythm section; and the 730 Series, with a more rock-oriented style, including Zero Time (1971) by TONTO's Expanding Head Band. He later set up Kokopelli Records after difficulty with established labels. In 1996, Mann collaborated with Stereolab on the song "One Note Samba/Surfboard" for the AIDS-Benefit album Red Hot + Rio produced by the Red Hot Organization. Mann also played flutes on the Bee Gees' album Spirits Having Flown.

His last appearance was on May 3, 2003, at the New Orleans Jazz and Heritage Festival.

In a review of Mann's Beyond Brooklyn (2004), his final recording (co-led with Phil Woods), critic George Kanzler proposed that Mann's status as an innovator had been overlooked:

...Mann's career, in both its questing nature and embrace of various musical styles, parallels that of Miles Davis. Mann championed Brazilian music even before Stan Getz. When Miles was fusing jazz with rock, Mann was fusing it with Memphis soul and Southern rock. He also was an early exponent of world music. But while Miles was usually hailed as a visionary, Mann was dismissed as just a popularizer selling out. It was a bum rap.

== Personal life and death ==
Mann was married to Susan Janeal Arison. His four children are: Paul Mann, Claudia Mann, Laura Mann-Lepik and Geoffrey Mann. Geoff is a multi-instrumentalist who plays drums for Los Angeles-based metal/afrobeat group Here Lies Man.

Mann died from prostate cancer on July 1, 2003, at his home in Pecos, New Mexico.
