= Eddie Costa discography =

This is the discography for American jazz musician Eddie Costa.

== As leader ==
Year recorded	Title	Label	Notes
1956	Eddie Costa/Vinnie Burke Trio	Josie	Trio, with Vinnie Burke (bass), Nick Stabulas (drums)
1957	Eddie Costa, Mat Mathews & Don Elliott at Newport	Verve	Trio, with Ernie Furtado (bass), Al Beldini (drums); quintet also with Rolf Kühn (clarinet), Dick Johnson (alto sax); in concert; shared with other bands
1957	Eddie Costa Quintet	Interlude	Quintet, with Phil Woods (alto sax), Art Farmer (trumpet), Teddy Kotick (bass), Paul Motian (drums)
1958	Guys and Dolls Like Vibes	Coral/Verve	Quartet, with Bill Evans (piano), Wendell Marshall (bass), Paul Motian (drums); Costa plays only vibes
1959	The House of Blue Lights	Dot	Trio, with Wendell Marshall (bass), Paul Motian (drums)

== As sideman ==
Costa played piano, vibes, or both on the albums listed in the table below. Other recordings, where his presence is disputed or the music is classical, are not listed.

Year recorded	Leader	Title	Label
1958	Harry Edison and Buck Clayton	Harry Edison Swings Buck Clayton	Verve
1960	Coleman Hawkins	Coleman Hawkins and His Orchestra	Crown
1960	Coleman Hawkins	The Hawk Swings	Crown
1962	Al Cohn	Jazz Mission to Moscow	Colpix
1962	Clark Terry	Clark Terry Plays the Jazz Version of All American	Moodsville
1957	Oscar Pettiford	Discoveries	Savoy
1961	George Barnes	Guitars Galore	Mercury
1961	Clark Terry and Bob Brookmeyer	Previously Unreleased Recordings	Verve
1962	Curtis Fuller	Cabin in the Sky	Impulse!
1962	Shelly Manne	2-3-4	Impulse!
1960	Gunther Schuller	Jazz Abstractions	Atlantic
1961	Tubby Hayes	The New York Sessions	Columbia
1961	Gil Evans	Into the Hot	Impulse!
1961	Bob Brookmeyer	Gloomy Sunday and Other Bright Moments	Verve
1960	Gigi Gryce	Reminiscin'	Mercury
1960	Jackie Paris	Jackie Paris Sings the Lyrics of Ira Gershwin	Time
1959	Mundell Lowe	TV Action Jazz!	RCA Camden
1960	Mundell Lowe	Themes from Mr. Lucky, the Untouchables and Other TV Action Jazz	RCA Camden
1961	Mundell Lowe	Satan in High Heels [soundtrack]	Charlie Parker
1959	Astor Piazzolla	Take Me Dancing! The Latin Rhythms of Astor Piazzolla	Tico
1959	Woody Herman	The Fourth Herd	Jazzland
1959	Woody Herman	Wild Root	
1959	Woody Herman	At the Round Table	Forum
1959	Donald Byrd	Bamba-Samba Bossa Nova	Everest
1958	Gloria Lynne	Miss Gloria Lynne	Everest
1958	Michel Legrand	Legrand Jazz	Columbia / Philips (in Europe)
1958	Denise Jannah	Steve Allen's Songs	Dot
1957	Frank Wess	Jazz Is Busting Out All Over	Savoy
1957	Billy VerPlanck	Dancing Jazz	Savoy
1957	Billy VerPlanck	Jazz for Playgirls	Savoy
1957	Herbie Mann	The Jazz We Heard Last Summer	Savoy
1957	Hal McKusick	Triple Exposure	Prestige
1957	Hal McKusick	Now's the Time	Fresh Sound
1957	Herbie Mann	Flute Flight	Prestige
1957	Herbie Mann	Yardbird Suite	Savoy
1960	Sid Cooper	Percussive Jazz Vol. 2	Audio Fidelity
1957	André Hodeir	Essais	Savoy
1956–57	Phil Woods	Young Woods	Fresh Sound
1957	Phil Woods	Bird Feathers	Prestige
1956	Sal Salvador	Frivolous Sal	Bethlehem
1956–57	Sal Salvador	Shades of Sal Salvador	Bethlehem
1954	Sal Salvador	Kenton Presents Jazz – Sal Salvador	Capitol
1956	Betty Roché	Take the "A" Train	Bethlehem
1956	Tal Farlow	Fuerst Set	Xanadu
1956	Tal Farlow	Second Set	Xanadu
1956	Tal Farlow	Tal	Norgran
1956	Tal Farlow	The Swinging Guitar of Tal Farlow	Verve
1957	Chris Connor	Chris Connor Sings the George Gershwin Almanac of Song	Atlantic
1956	Chris Connor	A Jazz Date with Chris Connor	Atlantic
1957	Tony Bennett	The Beat of My Heart	Columbia
1962	Tony Bennett	Tony Bennett at Carnegie Hall	Columbia
1957	Don Bagley	Jazz on the Rocks	Regent
1955	Mike Cuozzo	Mighty Mike Cuozzo	Savoy
1956	Mike Cuozzo	Mike Cuozzo with the Costa-Burke Trio	Jubilee
1956	Manny Albam	The Drum Suite	RCA
1957	Manny Albam	The Blues Is Everybody's Business	Coral
1957	Manny Albam	West Side Story	Coral
1958	Manny Albam	Jazz New York	Dot
1959	Manny Albam	Something New, Something Blue	Columbia
1962	Manny Albam	Jazz Goes to the Movies	Impulse!
1959	Manny Albam	A Gallery of Gershwin	Coral
1955	John Mehegan	A Pair of Pianos	Savoy
1956	Bobby Jaspar	Bobby Jaspar Quintet	Columbia
1958	Barry Galbraith	Guitar and the Wind	Decca
1958	Frank Wess	The Spirit of Charlie Parker	World Wide
1956	Frank Socolow	Sounds by Socolow	Bethlehem
1958	A. K. Salim	Blues Suite	Savoy
1956	Betty Glamann	Swingin' on a Harp	Mercury
1956	Johnny Mathis	A New Sound in Popular Song	Columbia
1956	Lenny Hambro	The Nature of Things	Epic
1956	Manhattan Jazz Septette	Manhattan Jazz Septette	Coral
1956	Vinnie Burke	The Vinnie Burke All Stars	ABC-Paramount
1956	Sue Sharon and Ralph Sharon	Mr & Mrs Jazz	Bethlehem
1957	Joe Puma	Joe Puma Jazz	Jubilee
1957	Ralph Sharon	Around the World in Jazz	Columbia
1957	Hal McKusick	Hal McKusick Quintet	Coral
1957	Sal Salvador	A Tribute to the Greats	Bethlehem
1957	Chuck Wayne	String Fever	Euphoria
1957	(Various)	Winner's Circle	Bethlehem
1957	(Various)	Tribute to Woody Herman	Crown
1958	Dori Howard	Dori Howard Sings	Dot
1958	Ralph Burns	Very Warm for Jazz	Decca
1958	Tal Farlow	This Is Tal Farlow	Verve
1958	(Various)	Flutin' the Bird	Savoy
1958	Jackie Davis	Most Happy Hammond	Capitol
1958	Billy VerPlanck	The Soul of Jazz	World Wide
1958	Luis Barreiro	Swinging Latin Nights	Blue Moon
1958	Manny Albam	Steve's Songs	Cot
1959	Aaron Bell	Music From "Peter Gunn"	Lion
1959	Dave Appell	Alone Together	Cameo
1959	Morgana King	The Greatest Songs Ever Swung	Camden
1959	Aaron Bell	Music from 77 Sunset Strip	Lion
1959	Aaron Bell	Victory at Sea in Jazz	Lion
1959	Coleman Hawkins	Bean and the Boys	Phoenix
1959	Ernie Wilkins	Here Comes the Swingin' Mr. Wilkins	Everest
1959	Roger King Mozian	Spectacular Percussion	MGM
1960	Ernie Wilkins	Big New Band of the '60s	Everest
1960	Ted Auletta	Exotica	Cameo
1961	Hal Mooney	Woodwinds and Percussion	Mercury
1961	Benny Goodman	Yale Archives Vol. 8	Musicmasters
1961	Raymond Scott	Raymond Scott & the Secret 7: The Unexpected	Top Rank
1961	Tony Bennett	My Heart Sings	Columbia
1961	Urbie Green	The Persuasive Trombone of Urbie Green Vol.2	Command
1962	Julius Watkins	French Horns for My Lady	Philips
1962	Kevin Gavin	Hey! This Is Kevin Gavin	Charlie Parker
1962	Eric Dolphy	Vintage Dolphy	GM
1962	Jerri Winters	Winters Again	Charlie Parker
