= Jazz Guitar (album) =

Studio album by Jim Hall
- Released: 1957
- Recorded: January 10 & 24, 1957
- Studio: Los Angeles, California
- Genre: Jazz
- Length: 47:15
- Label: Pacific Jazz
- Producer: Richard Bock

Jim Hall chronology
Jazz Guitar (1957)	The Street Swingers (1957)

Jazz Guitar is the debut album by jazz guitarist Jim Hall, recorded in early 1957 for the Pacific Jazz label. It is composed mostly of standards. Hall's group for the original recording sessions was a guitar/piano/bass trio, an instrumental combination popularized by Nat King Cole in the 1940s, and previously used by the poll-winning guitarist Tal Farlow on two notable albums recorded in 1956 for Norgran and Verve.

== Release history ==
Jazz Guitar was released as a mono LP by Pacific Jazz Records in 1957 (PJ-1227) with 10 tracks. Hall at the time was a member of the Chico Hamilton Quintet, which was also recording for Pacific Jazz during the mid-1950s. Jazz Guitar did not sell enough for Pacific Jazz to record a follow-up LP, and Hall continued to work as a backing musician and session musician for more than a decade. He was not given another opportunity to record again under his own name until 1969, when MPS Records released It's Nice to Be With You, though he was a co-leader on several albums released between 1957 and 1966.

In 1963, during a period when jazz guitar albums by Wes Montgomery and Kenny Burrell were selling well, Pacific Jazz decided to re-release Jazz Guitar, but with significant alterations. Most noticeably, the label hired drummer Larry Bunker to overdub drum parts on the album. Additionally, half of the tracks were also edited to be shorter, with solo sections featuring pianist Carl Perkins and bassist Red Mitchell removed. These edits were made to the master tapes, and no backup copies of the original-length performances were retained by Pacific Jazz Records, with the exception of one title, "Things Ain't What They Used to Be". Pacific Jazz released the revised version of Jazz Guitar in stereo (ST-79), with a different track order from the original LP release and without the song "This Is Always".

In 1988, EMI, which had acquired Pacific Jazz in 1979 as part of their purchase of United Artists Records, released the album on compact disc under the Capitol Records imprint (CDP 7 46851 2). For the CD release, EMI producer Michael Cuscuna used the edited master tapes that were retained from the 1963 LP reissue, but without the overdubbed drum parts. An additional track from the recording sessions, "Too Close For Comfort", was added to the 1988 CD release, and the song "This Is Always" was left off the CD because the master tape no longer existed in any version. The 1988 CD included both the 1963 edit of "Things Ain't What They Used to Be" and the full-length 1957 version of the same performance that had survived. On the CD, the full-length version of "Things Ain't What They Used to Be" was mistakenly identified as an alternate take.

In 2011, the Essential Jazz Classics label released a CD edition of the album (EJC 55494) that used a copy of the 1957 LP release as source material for the tracks that had been edited in 1963. This release was titled The Complete "Jazz Guitar", and it included all the tracks from the 1957 LP release in their original unedited versions, plus the bonus track "Too Close for Comfort" from the original recording sessions, and five bonus tracks featuring Hall with pianist John Lewis and other musicians. The tracks with Lewis were recorded between 1956 and 1960, and were not part of the sessions for Jazz Guitar.

== Reception ==
Professional ratings
Review scores
Source	Rating
AllMusic	4/5 stars
Disc	3/5 stars

The AllMusic review by Ken Dryden stated: "A valuable introduction to the long, successful career of Jim Hall. The music sticks to familiar standards from the swing era and is often low key, much like the man himself."

== Track listing (1957 LP release) ==
No.	Title	Length
1.	"Stompin' at the Savoy" (Benny Goodman/Chick Webb/Edgar Sampson)	4:35
2.	"Things Ain't What They Used to Be" (Mercer Ellington)	5:44
3.	"This Is Always" (Harry Warren/Mack Gordon)	2:46
4.	"Thanks for the Memory" (Ralph Rainger/Leo Robin)	5:15
5.	"Tangerine" (Johnny Mercer/Victor Schertzinger)	4:25
6.	"Stella by Starlight" (Victor Young/Ned Washington)	5:54
7.	"9:20 Special" (Earle Warren/Jack Palmer/William Engvick)	5:42
8.	"Deep in a Dream" (Jimmy Van Heusen/Eddie DeLange)	4:31
9.	"Look for the Silver Lining" (Jerome Kern/Buddy DeSylva)	5:01
10.	"Seven Come Eleven" (Goodman/Charlie Christian)	4:25

== Track listing (1988 CD Release) ==
No.	Title	Length
1.	"Stompin' at the Savoy" (edited version)	4:04
2.	"Things Ain't What They Used to Be" (edited version of master take)	4:41
3.	"Things Ain't What They Used to Be" (full length version of master take, identified as "alternate take")	5:44
4.	"Thanks for the Memory"	5:15
5.	"Tangerine" (edited version)	3:53
6.	"Stella by Starlight" (edited version)	3:07
7.	"9:20 Special"	5:42
8.	"Deep in a Dream"	4:31
9.	"Look for the Silver Lining" (edited version)	3:14
10.	"Seven Come Eleven" (edited version)	3:50
11.	"Too Close for Comfort" (bonus track from original recording sessions)	4:23

== Personnel ==
- Jim Hall – guitar
- Carl Perkins – piano
- Red Mitchell – double bass
- Larry Bunker - overdubbed drums, 1963 Pacific Jazz LP release only
