= Art Vincent =

- Art Vincent, The Art of Jazz
- Born: December 30, 1926; New Jersey
- Died: October 27, 1993 (aged 66); California
- Presenting career
- Show: The Art of Jazz
- Stations: WFHA, WJLK, WRLB, WBGO
- Network: Backstage America
- Style: Jazz, interviews, talk

Art Vincent (December 30, 1926 - October 27, 1993) was an American jazz disc jockey, concert producer and MC.

Vincent's broadcasting career spanned almost 30 years, from about 1960 through 1989. For much of that time, his program, "The Art of Jazz," aired on FM radio stations in New Jersey and throughout the New York metropolitan area. Vincent was known for his smooth voice and wide knowledge of jazz. He helped popularize jazz as a unique American art form on a par with western classical music.

A popular part of Vincent's radio broadcasts were his interviews with popular jazz artists, including Louis Armstrong, Count Basie, Dave Brubeck, Ray Charles, Roy Eldridge, Duke Ellington, Tal Farlow, Art Farmer, Dizzie Gillespie, Jimmy Hamilton, Woody Herman, Richard "Groove" Holmes, Kenyon Hopkins, Stan Kenton, Gerry Mulligan, Peter Nero, Anita O'Day, Houston Person, Arthur Prysock, Lou Rawls, Don Sebesky, Jimmy Smith, Maxine Sullivan, Dr. Billy Taylor, Cal Tjader, and Dinah Washington.

== Career ==
=== Radio and concert work ===
In 1956, Art Vincent developed the engineering plans for radio station WFHA. He and the station manager built WFHA from the ground up, completing it in 1959. Vincent became the station's chief engineer. Around 1960, Vincent hosted his first broadcast on WFHA, a short-lived country music show. In 1961 he debuted his show, "The Art of Jazz."

Vincent broadcast a wide range of jazz recordings, from obscure to popular, including many subgenres such as Blues, Dixieland, Manouche, Bebop, contemporary, and Avant-Garde. His shows often included contests and call-in segments. Jazz musicians were frequent in-studio guests, and Vincent would often play interviews he had recorded on-location.

Vincent was a maverick, choosing not to follow some of the commercial broadcasting conventions of his day. He wouldn't speak over the beginning or end of a track, as was the norm for most DJs of the time. He would play several tracks in sequence, talk-free and without commercials. He declined to use management-endorsed playlists, instead developing playlists for each broadcast based on his personal taste and feedback from listeners and musicians.

In 1967, Vincent moved his show to WJLK and then to WRLB in 1969. He was popular in the NY area jazz community and developed close relationships with fans and musicians alike. In 1972, he was a guest on the WOR television program, "The Joe Franklin Show," along with flutist Bobbi Humphrey. Vincent also appeared on the Franklin show in the late 1960s or early 1970s, with his longtime friend and guitarist Tal Farlow. Additionally, Farlow composed theme music for the "Art of Jazz," writing two iterations of the theme: "Blue Art" and "Blue Art, Too." Farlow released the latter version on LP in 1981.

Throughout his career, Vincent served as master of ceremonies for jazz concerts in New Jersey and elsewhere. In 1972, he helped in the formation of a long-running jazz performance series at the Monmouth County Library in New Jersey. Vincent proposed the idea, and worked with library management to plan the first jazz concerts held in a U.S. public library reading room. He served as MC for the initial three years of the series. Vincent also produced dozens of jazz concerts, at various venues, featuring performers such as Ruth Brown, Tal Farlow, Jimmy Heath, Etta Jones, Hank Jones, Wynton Marsalis, Ray Nance, Zoot Sims, Grady Tate, and Teddy Wilson. Vincent can also be heard as MC on the final track of guitarist Eddie Hazel's 1976 album "Take Your Shoes Off, Baby." In the mid-1970s, with friends and colleagues, he started the AOJ & Company, a non-profit organization devoted to the promotion of jazz through live concerts, lectures and member networking.

In 1979, the "Art of Jazz" show moved to NPR affiliate WBGO. That same year, Vincent was heard on NPR hosting the EBU's French Jazz Festival (and again in 1981). In 1980, Vincent co-hosted the "Kool Jazz Festival" on NPR, live from Gracie Mansion in New York City. For the 1980-1981 Golden Apple Awards, NYC Jazz Magazine readers nominated Vincent as the best DJ in the local jazz community. Vincent left WBGO in 1981, but continued to be active in the New York area jazz scene. In the mid-1980s, he was heard on WBJB.

In the late 1980s, Vincent recorded a series of jazz musician interviews for Florida-based "Backstage America," a nationally syndicated program of arts-related news and commentary. Vincent's 15 minute "Jazzcast" segments were heard on radio stations in 17 states. He interviewed over 75 musicians for this series, including Toshiko Akiyoshi, Betty Carter, Buck Clayton, Panama Francis, Chico Hamilton, Milt Hinton, Clifford Jordan, Branford Marsalis, David "Fathead" Newman, and Sun Ra.

Vincent's radio show received a mention in Batt Johnson's book, "What is This Thing Called Jazz?" (iUniverse, 2000). Part of Vincent's 1973 interview with bassist Gene Ramey is quoted in Richard Lawn's textbook, "Experiencing Jazz" (McGraw-Hill, 2006; Routledge, 2nd ed. 2012).

=== Writing ===
Art Vincent wrote the liner notes for several jazz albums, including:

Houston Person, "Soul Dance!" Prestige Records, original release 1969 (reissued on CD as part of the two disc set "Truth!")
Boogaloo Joe Jones, "Right On Brother" Prestige Records, original release 1970 (reissued on CD)
Ray Rivera, "Big City Blues" Zanzee Records, 1972
Tal Farlow, "Chromatic Palette" Concord Jazz, original release 1981 (reissued on CD; includes the theme music "Blue Art, Too")
