= The Jazz Guitarist =

Studio album by Chuck Wayne
- Released: 1956
- Recorded: April 13, 1953 & June 10, 1954
- Studio: Van Gelder Studio, Hackensack, NJ
- Genre: Jazz
- Length: 34:48
- Label: Savoy; MG 12077
- Producer: Gus Grant/Ozzie Cadena

Chuck Wayne chronology
The Jazz Guitarist (1956)	The Four Most Guitars (1956)

Chuck Wayne Quintet Cover

The Jazz Guitarist is an album by jazz guitarist Chuck Wayne which was released on the Savoy label in 1956. The album comprised two recording sessions, one recorded in 1953 (originally released as Chuck Wayne Quintet on a 10-inch LP on Progressive) and the other from 1954,

== Reception ==
Professional ratings
Review scores
Source	Rating
Allmusic	2/5 stars

Allmusic awarded the album 2 stars and the review by Dave Nathan stated: "These arrangements could be heard in a hundred lounges and small clubs throughout the country during the years when this album was made. While there is virtually no inventiveness going on, the playing is entertaining. One quality that comes through with the Wayne guitar is its hornlike sound, which adds a dimension to his playing and is especially complementary when either Sims or Moore is soloing ... Several of the players at these sessions were from the upper echelons of jazz; it's regrettable they were not offered more interesting or challenging music to perform".

== Track listing ==
All compositions by Chuck Wayne except where noted

1. "You Brought a New Kind of Love to Me" (Sammy Fain, Irving Kahal, Pierre Norman) – 3:03
2. "S.S. Cool" – 2:44
3. "Mary Ann" – 2:31
4. "Butterfingers" – 3:29
5. "Taking a Chance on Love" (Vernon Duke, Ted Fetter, John La Touche) – 2:47
6. "Sirod" (John Mehegan) – 3:00
7. "While My Lady Sleeps" (Bronisław Kaper, Gus Kahn) – 2:34
8. "Tasty Pudding" (Al Cohn) – 3:22
9. "Prospecting" – 2:33
10. "Sidewalks of Cuba" – 2:56
11. "Uncus" (Mehegan) – 2:21
12. "Stella by Starlight" (Victor Young, Ned Washington) – 3:28
- Recorded on April 13, 1953 (tracks 1–4 & 7–10) and June 10, 1954 (tracks 5, 6, 11 & 12)

== Personnel ==
- Chuck Wayne – guitar
- Brew Moore (tracks 1–3), Zoot Sims (tracks 4 & 7–10) – tenor saxophone
- Harvey Leonard (tracks 1–4 & 7–10), John Mehegan (tracks 5, 6, 11 & 12) – piano
- George Duvivier (tracks 1–4 & 7–10), Vinnie Burke (tracks 5, 6, 11 & 12) – bass
- Joe Morello (tracks 5, 6, 11 & 12), Ed Shaughnessy (tracks 1–4 & 7–10) – drums
