= Cuozzo =

Cuozzo is a surname, and may refer to:

- Gary Cuozzo (born 1941), American football player
- Mike Cuozzo (1925–2006), American jazz saxophonist
- Steve Cuozzo (born 1950), American writer and editor

== See also ==
- Cuozzo Speed Technologies, LLC v. Lee, a 2015 term United States Supreme Court patent law opinion by Samuel Alito, usually referred to as Cuozzo
