= While My Lady Sleeps (song) =

1941 jazz song

Song by Nelson Eddy
- Published: January 21, 1941
- Genre: Traditional Pop; Jazz
- Composer: Bronisław Kaper
- Lyricist: Gus Kahn

"While My Lady Sleeps" is a 1941 jazz standard composed by Bronisław Kaper with lyrics by Gus Kahn. The song was written for the Metro-Goldwyn-Mayer film The Chocolate Soldier, where it was sung by Nelson Eddy.

The song's main key is C major and its chorus has an unusual 40-bar AABC form.

== Notable renditions ==
- Ray Noble and His Orchestra with Roy Lanson (1941)
- Chuck Wayne – The Jazz Guitarist (1953)
- Al Cohn – The Sax Section (1956)
- Phineas Newborn Jr. – While My Lady Sleeps (1957)
- John Coltrane – Coltrane (1957)
- Chet Baker – 1987 CD reissue of It Could Happen to You (1958)
- Nelson Eddy – Favorites in Stereo (1958)
- Mike Taylor – Trio (1967)
- Harold Mabern and Geoff Keezer – For Phineas (1995)
- Jan Lundgren – A Touch Of You (1998)
- Michael Feinstein – Fly Me to the Moon (2010)
