= The Swinging Guitar of Tal Farlow =

Studio album by Tal Farlow
- Released: 1957
- Recorded: May 1956
- Genre: Jazz, bebop
- Length: 62:29 (Reissue)
- Label: Verve
- Producer: Norman Granz

Tal Farlow chronology
Tal (1956)	The Swinging Guitar of Tal Farlow (1957)	This is Tal Farlow (1958)

Professional ratings
Review scores
Source	Rating
Allmusic	4.5/5 stars
The Penguin Guide to Jazz Recordings	4/4 stars

The Swinging Guitar of Tal Farlow is an album by American jazz guitarist Tal Farlow, released in 1957.

== Track listing ==
1. "Taking a Chance on Love" (Vernon Duke, John Latouche, Ted Fetter) – 4:43
2. "Yardbird Suite" (Charlie Parker) – 5:15
3. "You Stepped Out of a Dream" (Nacio Herb Brown, Gus Kahn) – 5:39
4. "They Can't Take That Away from Me" (George Gershwin, Ira Gershwin) – 5:42
5. "Like Someone in Love" (Johnny Burke, Jimmy Van Heusen) – 6:38
6. "Meteor" (Tal Farlow) – 6:35
7. "I Love You" (Cole Porter) – 5:30
  1999 reissue bonus tracks & alternate takes:
8. "Gone with the Wind" (Allie Wrubel, Herb Magidson) – 5:26
9. "Taking a Chance on Love" – 6:12
10. "Yardbird Suite" – 5:12
11. "Gone with the Wind" – 5:37

== Personnel ==
- Tal Farlow – guitar
- Eddie Costa – piano
- Vinnie Burke – bass

Production notes:

- Norman Granz – producer
