= Warren Chiasson =

Canadian jazz vibraphonist

- Born: April 17, 1934 (age 92); Chéticamp, Nova Scotia, Canada
- Genres: Jazz
- Occupation: Musician
- Instrument: Vibraphone
- Years active: 1959–present
- Website: warrenchiasson.com

Warren Chiasson (born April 17, 1934) is a Canadian jazz vibraphonist who is a pioneer of the four-mallet vibraphone technique.

== Career ==
Chiasson was born in Nova Scotia and moved to New York City in 1959. He played with George Shearing from 1959 to 1961 and then split off to form his own group, though he did also play with Chet Baker and Tal Farlow. He played vibes in New York through the 1960s and spent four years playing percussion for the Broadway musical Hair. In 1972 he played with Shearing again and also released a record under his own name. In the mid-1970s he toured with Roberta Flack. He had a long-running duo with Chuck Wayne.

Chiasson played on the B.B. King album Blues 'n Jazz, which won a Grammy Award in 1984. Other work as a session musician includes recordings with Hank Crawford, Les McCann, Helen Ward, and Chuck Wayne. He played at the 1988 50th anniversary of From Spirituals to Swing at Carnegie Hall; when Lionel Hampton was unable to perform, Chiasson filled in opposite Benny Goodman.

== Discography ==
=== As leader ===
- Good Vibes for Kurt Weill (Monmouth Evergreen, 1978)
- Point/Counterpoint (Empathy, 1988)
- Quartessence (Progressive, 2007)

=== As sideman ===
With Cynthia Crane

- Smoky Bar Songs for the No Smoking Section (Lookoutjazz, 1994)
- Blue Rendezvous (Lookoutjazz, 1995)
- Cynthia's in Love (Lookoutjazz, 1997)

With George Shearing

- Latin Affair (Capitol, 1960)
- Mood Latino (Capitol, 1961)
- Satin Affair (Capitol, 1961)
- San Francisco Scene (Capitol, 1962)

With others

- Hank Crawford, Centerpiece (Buddah, 1980)
- Eric Dolphy, Vintage Dolphy (Enja, 1987)
- Roberta Flack, Roberta Flack (Atlantic, 1978)
- B.B. King, Blues 'n' Jazz (MCA, 1983)
- B.B. King, King of the Blues (MCA, 1992)
- Peggy Lee, Beauty and the Beat! (Axis, 1987)
- Will Lee, Birdhouse (Lee Way, 2001)
- Galt MacDermot, Hair (Duchesse, 1968)
- Galt MacDermot, Galt MacDermot's First Natural Hair Band (United Artists, 1970)
- Les McCann, Les McCann Plays the Hits (Limelight, 1966)
- Stephanie Nakasian, Comin' Alive (V.S.O.P., 1989)
- Sir Douglas Band, Texas Tornado (Atlantic, 1973)
- Frank Strozier, Dance Dance (Trident, 1976)
- Harold Vick, Straight Up (RCA Victor, 1967)
- Chuck Wayne, Traveling (Progressive, 1980)
