= New York Journeyman – Complete Recordings =

New York Journeyman - Complete Recordings

Compilation album by Frank Socolow
- Released: 2005
- Recorded: May 2, 1945, November 1956
- Genre: Jazz
- Length: 41:01
- Label: Fresh Sound
- Producer: Jodi Pujol

Professional ratings
Review scores
Source	Rating
The Penguin Guide to Jazz Recordings	3/4 stars

New York Journeyman – Complete Recordings is a compilation album of the two sessions that jazz saxophonist Frank Socolow recorded as leader, released on Fresh Sound Records in 2005.

== History ==
The first session, produced by Bob Shad, was recorded on May 2, 1945, for Duke Records under the name Frank Socolow's Duke Quintet. Four tracks were recorded, but one of them, "Blue Fantasy", was never released and has been lost, so only three tracks are available.

Two things are of particular note about this session. One is a 20-year-old Bud Powell making only his third appearance in a recording studio (having recorded two sessions the previous year with Cootie Williams) – according to Mark Gardner, who wrote the liner notes for the Xanadu Records re-release, Socolow and drummer Irv Kluger went to see Powell playing in a club in Greenwich Village and "The pair flipped when they heard Bud's dynamic and totally new style of piano playing, and needed no further convincing". The second is the capturing of Freddie Webster, whose recorded legacy is very sparse, at the height of his powers, and playing one of his own compositions, "Reverse the Charges", two years before his early death.

The second session was recorded in November 1956 and released as Sounds by Socolow by Bethlehem Records. Socolow invited Manny Albam, Bill Holman, and Sal Salvador, three band leaders he had worked with many times, to arrange material for a sextet featuring himself, Eddie Bert on trombone, the aforementioned Salvador on guitar, and Eddie Costa on piano. Socolow switches to alto for two tracks: "Farfel" (named after his nickname for his son), and "I Cried for You".

== Release history ==
The 1945 session was first released as 78 rpm singles in 1945 by Duke Records: "The Man I Love c/w Reverse the Changes" (Duke 112), and "September in the Rain" (Duke 115), and then re-released on a Xanadu Records compilation in 1987, Bebop Revisited, Vol. 6. The 1956 session was released as a 12" LP by Bethlehem Records in 1956, and previously re-issued by Fresh Sound on CD in 1985.

== Track listing ==
Except where otherwise noted, all songs composed by Frank Socolow.

1. "Reverse the Charges" (Freddie Webster) – 2:54
2. "The Man I Love" (George Gershwin, Ira Gershwin) – 3:16
3. "September in the Rain" (Al Dubin, Harry Warren) – 2:46
4. "Miss Finegold" – 2:57
5. "But Not for Me" (Gershwin, Gershwin) – 3:07
6. "Swing Low Sweet Socolow" (Sal Salvador) – 2:52
7. "How About You?" (Burton Lane, Ralph Freed) – 3:51
8. "My Heart Stood Still" (Richard Rodgers, Lorenz Hart) – 3:11
9. "Little Joe" – 4:11
10. "Farfel" – 3:30
11. "I'll Take Romance" (Ben Oakland, Oscar Hammerstein II) – 4:05
12. "I Love You" (Cole Porter) – 4:12
13. "I Cried for You" (Abe Lyman, Gus Arnheim, Arthur Freed) – 4:09

== Personnel ==
May 2, 1945 session: tracks 1–3

- Frank Socolow – tenor sax
- Freddie Webster – trumpet
- Bud Powell – piano
- Leonard Gaskin – bass
- Irv Kluger – drums

November, 1956 session: tracks 4–13

- Frank Socolow – tenor sax, alto sax (tracks 10, 13)
- Eddie Bert – trombone
- Sal Salvador – guitar
- Eddie Costa – piano
- Bill Takus – bass
- Jimmy Campbell – drums
- Manny Albam – arrangements (tracks 4–5, 7, 13)
- Sal Salvador – arrangements (tracks 6, 10, 12)
- Bill Holman – arrangements (tracks 8–9, 11)
