= The Chocolate Soldier (film) =

1941 film

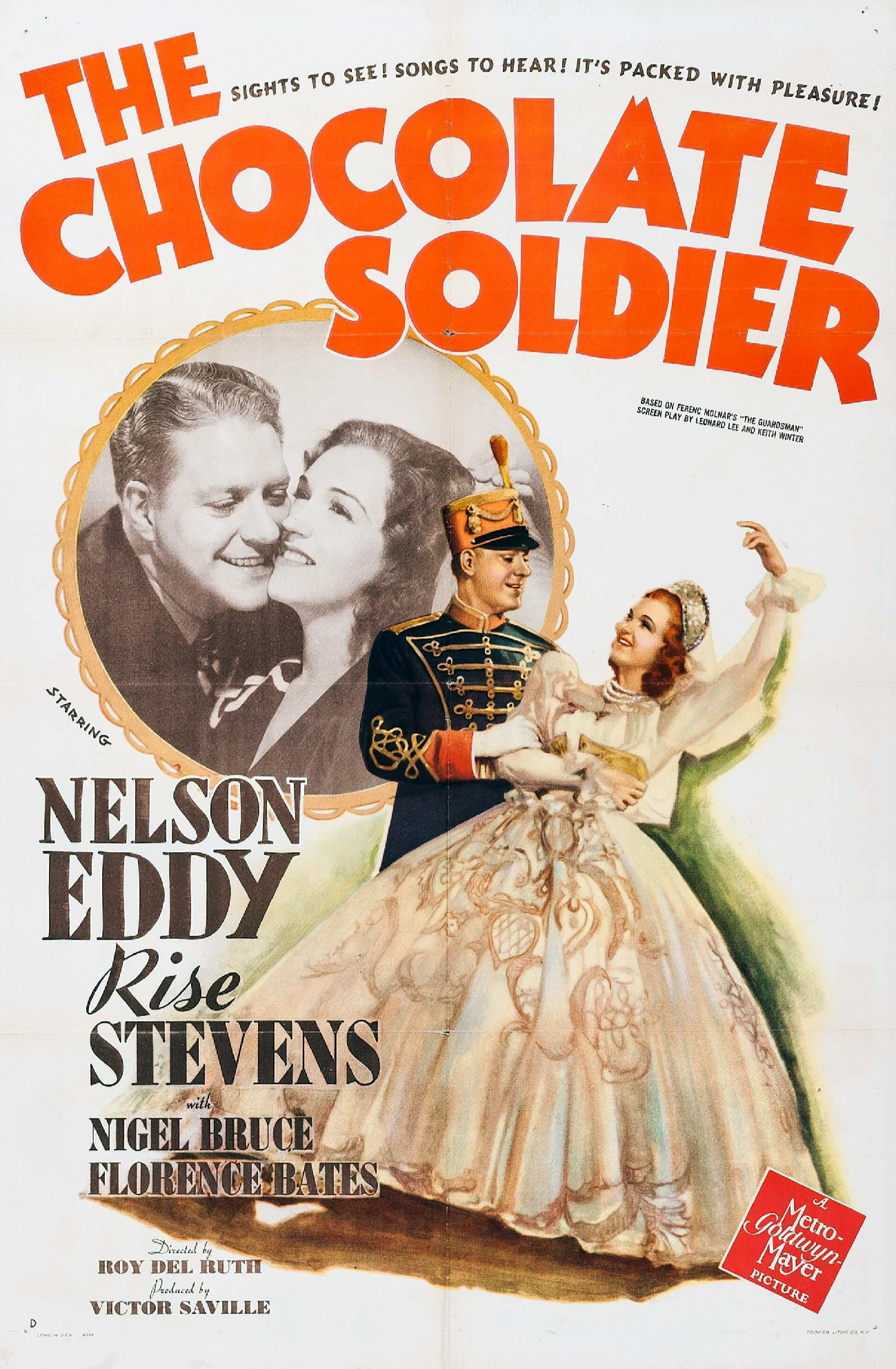
- Film poster
- Directed by: Roy Del Ruth
- Written by: Leonard Lee; Keith Winter
- Based on: Testőr by Ferenc Molnár
- Produced by: Victor Saville
- Starring: Nelson Eddy; Risë Stevens; Nigel Bruce
- Cinematography: Karl Freund
- Edited by: James E. Newcom
- Music by: Herbert Stothart; Bronislau Kaper
- Production company: Metro-Goldwyn-Mayer
- Distributed by: Loew's Inc.
- Release date: October 31, 1941 (New York City)
- Running time: 102 minutes
- Country: United States
- Language: English

The Chocolate Soldier is a 1941 American musical film directed by Roy Del Ruth. It uses original music from the Oscar Straus 1908 operetta of the same name, which was based on George Bernard Shaw’s 1894 play Arms and the Man. Unable to come to terms with Shaw, the studio used a story to which it already had rights: the Ferenc Molnár play The Guardsman (originally Testőr). The plot centers on the romantic misunderstandings and professional conflicts between two recently married opera singers, played by Metropolitan Opera star Risë Stevens (in her film debut) and Nelson Eddy, who perform excerpts from the operetta during the film. This screenplay was written by Leonard Lee and Keith Winter. The Guardsman—a huge hit on Broadway in 1924— was brought to the screen in 1931, with Alfred Lunt and Lynn Fontanne reprising their stage roles as married actors.

== Plot ==
The opening panel reads: "This story takes place in Balkany. The time we cannot fix it. When Russians Prussians Turks and Czechs were reticent to mix it."

Karl Lang and Maria Lanyi are not only successful opera stars, they have also recently been married. However, both suffer pangs of jealousy where the other is concerned, since both receive quite a bit of attention from members of the opposite sex. Karl's jealousy is heightened, however, when Maria tells him that she intends to leave their current musical comedy career and seek a career in opera. Karl sees it as a pretext to spend more time away from him.

In order to test his jealous suspicions, Karl hatches a plan to impersonate a Russian singer, Vassily Vassilievitch, and romance Maria in that guise. The plan goes awry, however, when Maria seemingly begins to respond to Vassily's advances. Unknown to Karl, Maria has seen through his impersonation and is thrilled that her husband would go to such lengths for her attention. Even the couple's dog sees through Karl's disguise. When events come to a head with an on-stage confrontation between a disguised Karl and Maria, she reveals her knowledge all along that Vassily was really Karl, and the two live happily ever after, except, of course, for Maria's continued flirtations.

== Cast ==
- Nelson Eddy as Karl Lang, aka Vassily Vassilievitch
- Risë Stevens as Maria Lanyi, Karl's Wife
- Nigel Bruce as Bernard Fischer, Critic
- Florence Bates as Madame 'Pugsie' Helene
- Dorothy Raye as Magda (as Dorothy Gilmore)
- Nydia Westman as Liesel, Maria's Maid
- Max Barwyn as Anton, Karl's Valet
- Charles Judels as Klementor, Double Eagle Manager

== Reception ==
In his November 1, 1941, review in The New York Times, Bosley Crowther told readers,

"Once you are properly acquainted with the contradictory fact that Metro's 'The Chocolate Soldier' [...] is not Oscar Straus's 'Chocolate Soldier' [...] but is Ferenc Molnar's 'The Guardsman' in a versatile disguise, then we can safely commend it as a tidy and tuneful musical film. [...] 'The Guardsman,' by previous demonstration, is a story that's hard to beat; the score from the Straus operetta, on which the present title is based, is packed with melodious songs [...] Miss Stevens and Mr. Eddy are not only able to sing at proper intervals the score of 'The Chocolate Soldier,' in which they are presumably playing—such old favorites as 'My Hero' [...] and the title song—but they are also able to wrestle amusingly off stage with the complications of 'The Guardsman.' And they can likewise slip in a couple of extra numbers on reasonable excuse—most charming of which, incidentally, are 'My Heart at Thy Sweet Voice' from 'Samson and Delilah,' sung by Miss Stevens, and 'The Song of the Flea,' by Mr. Eddy, plus a new number, 'While My Lady Sleeps.'

Regarding the performances, Crowther praised Stevens as "a charming and talented singer with a surprising ability to act [...] nicely suited for the role of the wife to a man who is so jealous that he assumes the disguise of another in order to test her." On the other hand, Crowther observed of her co-star that "Mr. Eddy is an utter revelation in the character and costume of a mad Cossack, which is what he temporarily pretends to be. As a matter of fact, he manages to alter his style so much that we have a generous suggestion: why not stick to the Russian...?"

On TCM.com, Leonard Maltin gives the film 2 out of 4 stars, commenting: "Much too talky and not enough music."

== Award nominations ==
Academy Award nominations:

- Cinematography: Karl Freund
- Music, Scoring of a Musical Picture: Herbert Stothart (scoring of a musical film) and Bronislau Kaper (musical adaptation and direction)
- Sound Recording: Douglas Shearer
