= Frank Socolow =

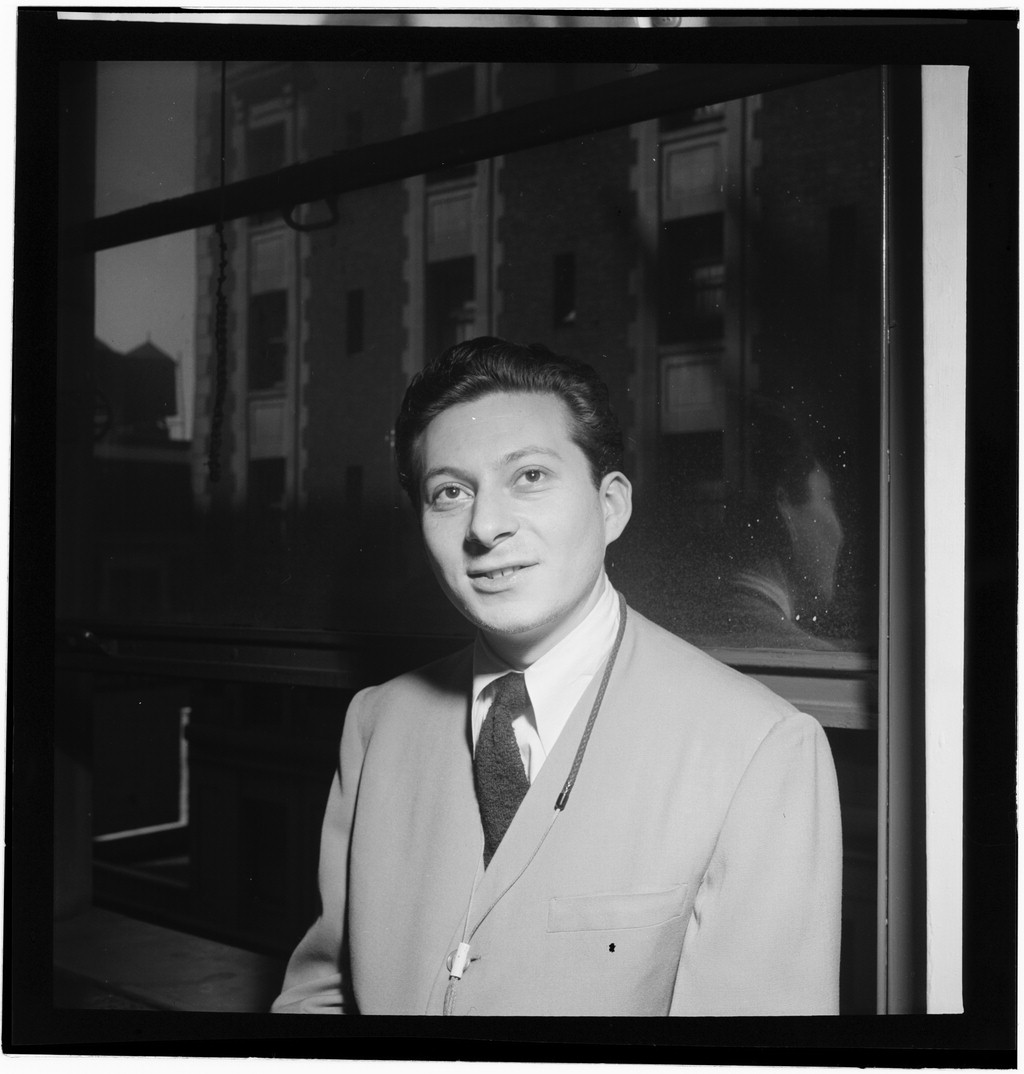
- Frank Socolow ca. June 1947 (by photographer William P. Gottlieb)

Background information
- Born: Frank Socolow; September 18, 1923
- Origin: New York City, United States
- Died: April 30, 1981 (aged 57)
- Genres: Jazz
- Instruments: tenor saxophone, alto saxophone, oboe
- Years active: 1941–1981
- Labels: Duke Records, Bethlehem Records

Frank Socolow (September 18, 1923 – April 30, 1981), born in New York City, was a jazz saxophonist and oboist, noted for his tenor playing.

Socolow began his career in the early 1940s playing in swing bands led by Jack Nelson, Georgie Auld, Ted Fio Rito, Roy Stevens, Van Alexander and Shep Fields. In 1944 he landed the first of three stints (the others being in 1948 and 1956–57) with Boyd Raeburn's Orchestra, recording a number of records. In 1945 he recorded a session as leader (the first of only two) with Freddie Webster and a young Bud Powell for Duke Records.

He was a member of Buddy Rich's short-lived big band, toured Scandinavia 1947-48 with Chubby Jackson, joined Artie Shaw's big band 1949-50, and throughout the late 40s and the 50s recorded with a wide variety of artists including the aforementioned, Johnny Bothwell, Charlie Ventura, Gene Krupa, Sal Salvador, Maynard Ferguson, Terry Gibbs, Phil Woods, Cecil Payne, Manny Albam, Hal McKusick, Johnny Richards, Bill Russo, Joe Morello, and Bobby Scott. His second record session as leader, and only full album release, Sounds by Socolow, came in 1956 for Bethlehem Records, with arrangements by Bill Holman, Manny Albam, and Sal Salvador, the latter also contributing guitar. Socolow died in New York in 1981.

With Bobby Scott, Red Kelly, and Kenny Hume, Socolow was part of a jazz quartet that played at the side of the stage during the Broadway performances of "A Taste of Honey," at the Lyceum Theatre, October 3, 1960, through September 9 1961.

== Discography ==
- Frank Socolow's Duke Quintet - "The Man I Love c/w Reverse the Changes" (Duke 112, 1945)
- Frank Socolow's Duke Quintet - "September in the Rain" (Duke 115, 1945)
- The Frank Socolow Sextet - Sounds by Socolow (Bethlehem BCP 70, 1956)
- Various Artists - Bebop Revisited, Vol. 6 (Xanadu 208, 1987) (Contains the three Duke tracks)
- Frank Socolow - New York Journeyman - Complete Recordings (Fresh Sound, 2005) (Contains all the above material)

=== As sideman ===
With Manny Albam

- Jazz Goes to the Movies (Impulse!, 1962)

With Terry Gibbs

- Vibes on Velvet (Emarcy 1955)
- Swingin' (with Terry Gibbs and His Orchestra) (Emarcy 1956)

With Gene Krupa

- Plays Gerry Mulligan Arrangements (Verve, 1959)

With Phil Woods and Cecil Payne

- Bird's Night - (Live at the Five Spot) (Signal 1957, Savoy 1958, Savoy Jazz 2 LPs 1985, Vogue 2 CDs 1990)
