= The Return of Tal Farlow =

Studio album by Tal Farlow
- Released: 1969
- Recorded: September 23, 1969
- Genre: Jazz
- Length: 41:25 (Reissue)
- Label: Prestige
- Producer: Don Schlitten

Tal Farlow chronology
Tal Farlow Plays the Music of Harold Arlen (1960)	The Return of Tal Farlow (1969)	Trinity (1976)

Professional ratings
Review scores
Source	Rating
Allmusic	3/5 stars
The Penguin Guide to Jazz Recordings	3.5/4 stars

The Return of Tal Farlow is an album by American jazz guitarist Tal Farlow, released in 1969.

== Track listing ==
1. "Straight, No Chaser" (Thelonious Monk) – 6:24
2. "Darn That Dream" (Eddie DeLange, Jimmy Van Heusen) – 4:25
3. "Summertime" (George Gershwin, Ira Gershwin, DuBose Heyward) – 5:38
4. "Sometime Ago" (Sergio Mihanovich) – 4:01
5. "I'll Remember April" (Gene de Paul, Patricia Johnston, Don Raye) – 7:32
6. "My Romance" (Richard Rodgers, Lorenz Hart) – 6:00
7. "Crazy She Calls Me" (Bob Russell, Carl Sigman) – 7:43

== Personnel ==
- Tal Farlow – guitar
- John Scully – piano
- Jack Six – bass
- Alan Dawson – drums

Production notes:

- Don Schlitten – producer
- Danfort Griffith– engineer
