= WBGO =

Jazz music public radio station in Newark, New Jersey

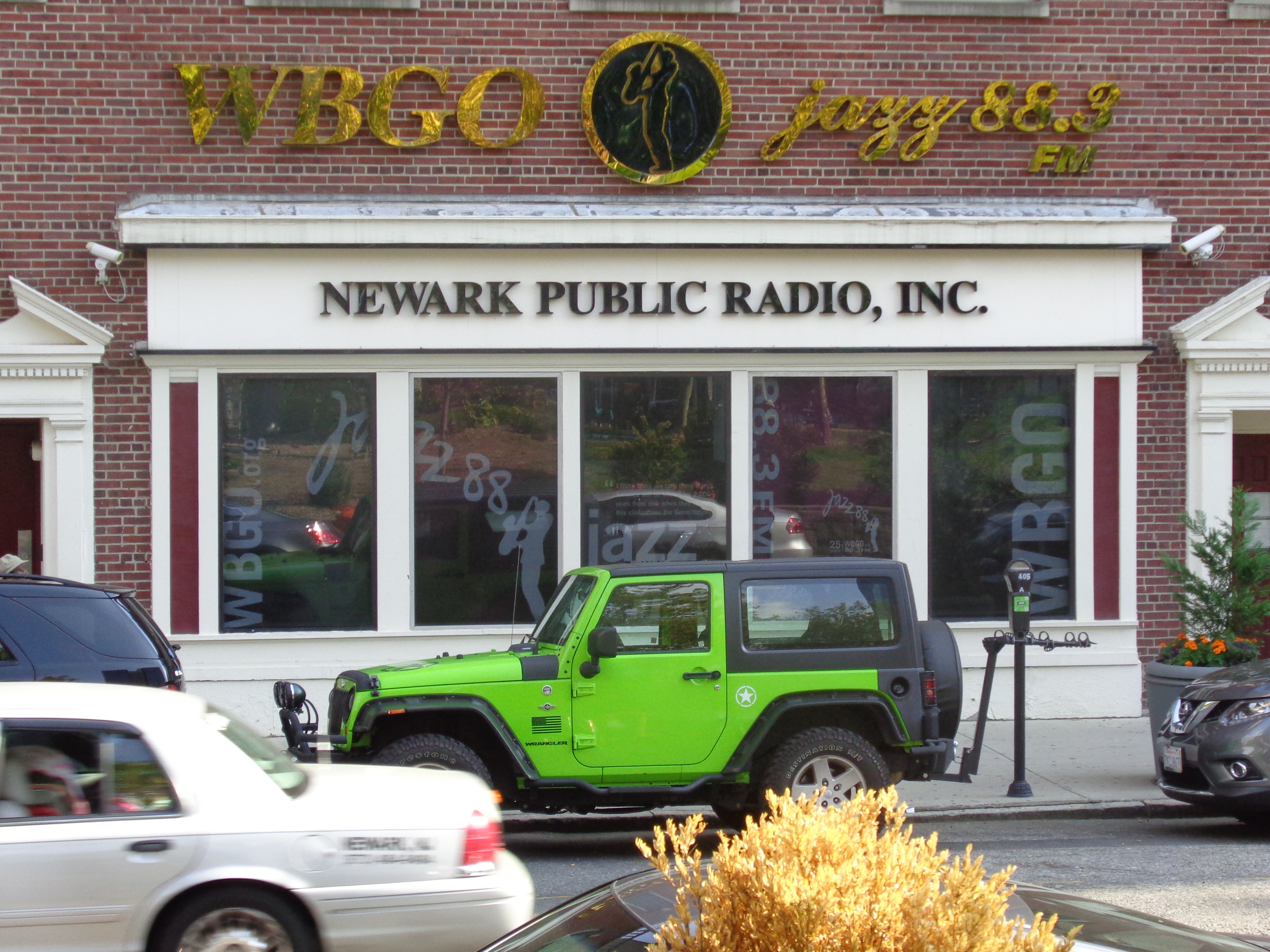
- Newark, New Jersey; United States
- Broadcast area: North Jersey; New York City
- Frequency: 88.3 MHz (HD Radio)
- Branding: WBGO Jazz 88

Programming
- Format: Jazz
- Subchannels: HD2: "The Jazz Bee" (jazz)
- Affiliations: NPR

Ownership
- Owner: Newark Public Radio

History
- First air date: 1948
- Call sign meaning: Bob G. Ottenhoff

Technical information
- Licensing authority: FCC
- Facility ID: 48699
- Class: B1
- ERP: 2,500 watts
- HAAT: 269.2 meters (883 ft)
- Transmitter coordinates: 40.756°N 73.986°W

Links
- Public license information: Public file; LMS
- Webcast: Listen live
- Website: www.wbgo.org

WBGO (88.3 FM, "Jazz 88") is a public radio station licensed to serve Newark, New Jersey. Its studios and offices are located on Park Place (AKA "Wayne Shorter Way" as of April 2022) in downtown Newark, and its transmitter is located at 4 Times Square in Manhattan. The station primarily plays jazz music. In addition the station airs public affairs programming, locally produced newscasts, and NPR-produced newscasts and programming.

== History ==
WBGO's first license was granted on January 26, 1947. Originally owned by the Newark Board of Education with studios in Central High School, it was established as the first public radio station in New Jersey when in 1979 the broadcast license was transferred to Newark Public Radio in cooperation with the Corporation for Public Broadcasting. WBGO then became affiliated with NPR and went to a 24-hour broadcast format in 1980.

While WBGO's base of operations remain in Newark, the station's broadcast antenna and transmission system moved to Midtown Manhattan on December 30, 2011.

WBGO was one of two major FM jazz stations in the New York City metropolitan area, along with smooth jazz station WQCD until 2008, when that station flipped to a rock format, leaving WBGO as the New York area's only jazz station.

== See also ==
- List of jazz radio stations in the United States
- Institute of Jazz Studies
- Art Vincent, host of The Art of Jazz
