= Cookin' on all Burners =

Studio album by Tal Farlow
- Released: 1983
- Recorded: August 1982
- Studio: Sound Makers Studios, New York City
- Genre: Jazz
- Length: 41:12
- Label: Concord Jazz
- Producer: Carl Jefferson

Tal Farlow chronology
Chromatic Palette (1981)	Cookin' on all Burners (1983)	Standards Recital (1993)

Professional ratings
Review scores
Source	Rating
Allmusic	4.5/5 stars
The Penguin Guide to Jazz Recordings	3/4 stars

Cookin' on all Burners is an album by American jazz guitarist Tal Farlow, released in 1983. The album featured a rhythm section including former Jazz Messenger pianist James Williams, and drummer Vinnie Johnson, who had played in the 1970s with T-Bone Walker and would later join Lester Bowie's Brass Fantasy.

== Track listing ==
1. "You'd Be So Nice to Come Home To" (Cole Porter) – 3:29
2. "If I Should Lose You" (Ralph Rainger, Leo Robin) – 5:00
3. "I Wished on the Moon" (Rainger, Dorothy Parker) – 5:23
4. "I've Got the World on a String" (Harold Arlen, Ted Koehler) – 6:23
5. "Love Letters" (Victor Young, Edward Heyman) – 3:58
6. "Why Shouldn't I?" (Porter) – 3:09
7. "Lullaby of the Leaves" (Bernice Petkere, Joe Young) – 5:40
8. "Just Friends" (John Klenner, Sam M. Lewis) – 3:49
9. "I Thought About You" (Jimmy Van Heusen, Johnny Mercer) – 4:21

== Personnel ==
- Tal Farlow – guitar
- James Williams – piano
- Gary Mazzaroppi – bass
- Vinnie Johnson – drums

Production notes:

- Carl Jefferson – producer
- Ed Trabanco – engineer
- Marie Ostrosky – assistant engineer
- Phil Edwards – engineer
- George Horn – remastering
- Kent Judkins – art direction
- Bruce Burr – photography
- Gordon Raddue – liner notes
- Kathleen Vance – production coordination
- Robert Walston – art direction
