= Autumn in New York (Tal Farlow album) =

Studio album by Tal Farlow
- Released: 1954
- Recorded: November 15, 1954
- Genre: Jazz
- Length: 34:39
- Label: Verve

Professional ratings
Review scores
Source	Rating
AllMusic	4/5 stars

Autumn in New York is an album recorded in 1954 by jazz guitarist Tal Farlow.

== Track listing ==
No.	Title	Length
1.	"I Like to Recognize the Tune" (Richard Rodgers, Lorenz Hart)	3:12
2.	"Strike Up the Band" (George Gershwin, Ira Gershwin)	3:29
3.	"Autumn in New York" (Vernon Duke)	5:06
4.	"And She Remembers Me" (Farlow)	4:25
5.	"Little Girl Blue" (Rodgers, Hart)	3:25
6.	"Have You Met Miss Jones?" (Rodgers, Hart)	4:59
7.	"Tal's Blues" (Farlow)	5:13
8.	"Cherokee" (Ray Noble)	4:51

== Personnel ==
- Tal Farlow – guitar
- Gerald Wiggins – piano
- Ray Brown – double bass
- Chico Hamilton – drums
