= Mat Mathews =

Dutch jazz accordionist (1924–2009)

- Born: Mathieu Hubert Wijnandts Schwarts; June 18, 1924; The Hague, Netherlands
- Died: February 12, 2009 (aged 84) Rotterdam, Netherlands
- Genres: Jazz
- Occupations: Musician, arranger, record producer
- Instrument: Accordion
- Years active: 1947 – 1993
- Labels: Brunswick, Dawn
- Website: www.matmathews.com

Mat Mathews, born Mathieu Hubert Wijnandts Schwarts (June 18, 1924 – February 12, 2009), was a Dutch jazz accordionist.

== Early life ==
Mathews was born in The Hague and learned to play accordion while the Netherlands was still under the Nazi rule during World War II. He originally took up music to avoid forced labor as those engaged in cultural endeavors were pardoned during the initial stages of the occupation. During the war he escaped from a Germany-bound prisoner train and hid for three years in the attic of his mother's house. After hearing Joe Mooney on an AFN radio broadcast after the war, he decided to play jazz.

== Later life and career ==
Mathews moved to New York in 1952 and formed a quartet which included Herbie Mann. He also worked with Kenny Clarke, Art Farmer, Percy Heath, Carmen McRae, Oscar Pettiford, Joe Puma, Milt Jackson and Julius Watkins. During the 1950s, he was consistently rated among the top three accordionists by the annual Down Beat readers poll, usually coming second to Art Van Damme. He worked mainly as a session musician in the late 1950s, and returned to the Netherlands in 1964, where he worked as an arranger, session musician, and record producer. In the 1970s, he worked in the US with Charlie Byrd, Doug Duke, Marian McPartland, and Clark Terry.

== Discography ==
- Jazz For G.I's (Brunswick 1954) -shared album with Tony Scott Quartet
- Accordion Solos (Brunswick, 1956) -recorded from 1953-54
- The Modern Art of Jazz (Dawn, 1956)
- The Gentle Art of Love (Dawn, 1956)
- 4 French Horns Plus Rhythm (Elektra, 1957)
- Eddie Costa, Mat Mathews & Don Elliott at Newport (Verve, 1957)
- Swingin' Pretty and All That Jazz (1959)
- Meditation (Jazz World, 1995)
- Live at Music Room (1996)

With New York Quartet

- New York Jazz Quartet (Elektra, 1957)
- New York Jazz Quartet Goes Native (Elektra, 1957)
- Music For Suburban Living (Coral, 1958)

=== As sideman ===
With Bob Stewart

- Let`s Talk About Love (London Dawn, 1956)

With Carmen McRae

- Carmen McRae (Bethlehem, 1955)
- By Special Request (Decca, 1956)

With Joe Puma

- Wild Kitten (Dawn, 1958)

With Rita Reys, Sylvia Pierce & Peggy Serra

- New Voices (Dawn, 1957)
