= For Phineas =

Piano album

Philadelphia Bound

Live album by Harold Mabern, Geoff Keezer
- Released: 1996
- Recorded: January 1995
- Venues: Montréal Bistro, Toronto
- Genre: Jazz
- Length: 1:03:13
- Label: Sackville

For Phineas is an album by pianists Harold Mabern and Geoff Keezer. It was recorded in 1995 and released by Sackville Records.

== Recording and music ==
The music was recorded in January 1995, in concert at the Montréal Bistro, Toronto. The two musicians are pianists Harold Mabern and Geoff Keezer. The album is dedicated to another piano player – Phineas Newborn Jr.

== Release and reception ==
Professional ratings
Review scores
Source	Rating
AllMusic	4/5 stars
The Penguin Guide to Jazz	3/4 stars

The album was released by Sackville Records. The AllMusic reviewer described it as "A swinging high-quality set within the modern mainstream." The Penguin Guide to Jazz commented that, "The pianos don't always chime comfortably, unless it's a recording artefact. Otherwise delightful."

== Track listing ==
1. "For Carl" – 8:49
2. "Jeannine" – 10:06
3. "I Get a Kick Out of You" – 4:42
4. "Jate" – 7:75
5. "While My Lady Sleeps" – 12:01
6. "Consummation" – 5:49
7. "Rakin' & Scrapin'" – 9:07
8. "Straighten Up & Fly Right" – 6:20

== Personnel ==
- Harold Mabern – piano
- Geoff Keezer – piano
