= The Street Swingers =

Studio album by Bob Brookmeyer, Jim Hall and Jimmy Raney
- Released: 1958
- Recorded: December 13 & 16, 1957; Coastal Studios, New York City
- Genre: Jazz
- Label: World Pacific; PJ 1239
- Producer: Richard Bock

Bob Brookmeyer chronology
Jazz Concerto Grosso (1957)	The Street Swingers (1958)	Kansas City Revisited (1958)

Jim Hall chronology
Jazz Guitar (1957)	The Street Swingers (1958)	A Girl & a Guitar (1958)

Jimmy Raney chronology
2 Guitars (1957)	The Street Swingers (1957)	Two Jims and Zoot (1964)

The Street Swingers is an album by jazz trombonist and pianist Bob Brookmeyer with guitarists Jim Hall and Jimmy Raney, recorded in late 1957 for the World Pacific label.

== Reception ==
Professional ratings
Review scores
Source	Rating
AllMusic	3/5 stars

The AllMusic review by Scott Yanow stated that "the tunes are fairly basic and all of the cool-toned musicians are up-to-par on the lightly swinging material."

== Track listing ==
1. "Arrowhead" (Jim Hall) - 8:59
2. "Street Swingers" (Bob Brookmeyer) - 6:20
3. "Hot Buttered Noodling" (Jimmy Raney) - 6:01
4. "Musicale du Jour" (Brookmeyer) - 8:49
5. "Raney Day" (Hall) - 5:24
6. "Jupiter" (Raney) - 5:06

== Personnel ==
- Bob Brookmeyer - valve trombone, piano
- Jim Hall, Jimmy Raney - guitar
- Bill Crow - bass
- Osie Johnson - drums
