= John Mehegan =

American jazz pianist, lecturer and critic (1916–1984)

- Born: June 6, 1916 Hartford, Connecticut, U.S.
- Died: April 3, 1984 (aged 67) New Canaan, Connecticut
- Genres: Jazz
- Occupation(s): Musician, lecturer, critic
- Instrument: Piano

John Francis Mehegan (June 6, 1916 – April 3, 1984) was an American jazz pianist, lecturer and critic.

== Early life ==
Mehegan was born in Hartford, Connecticut, on June 6, 1916, although he sometimes gave the year as 1920. He began playing the violin in 1926 and played for seven years without enjoying it. He initially taught himself to play the piano by matching his fingers to the notes played on a player piano. He went on to study at the Hartt School of Music in Hartford. He had gigs in the Massachusetts area, and then moved to New York in 1941.

== Later life and career ==
In New York, Mehegan played in clubs. He recorded four quartet tracks as a leader for Savoy Records in 1945. In the same year, he became teaching assistant to pianist Teddy Wilson in the jazz department at the Metropolitan Music School, and became the head of its jazz department in 1946; a position he held for around a decade. In the early 1950s, his From Barrelhouse to Bop album was the first release by Perspective Records; it consisted of spoken introductions followed by performances in the style of other jazz pianists. He also taught at the Juilliard School of Music (1947–64), Columbia University Teachers College (1958 to 1961 or 1962), the University of Bridgeport (1968–77) and Yale University (1974–83).

He wrote the incidental music for A Streetcar Named Desire which he performed on Broadway for two years. Mehegan was questioned by the House Un-American Activities Committee, where he was an uncooperative witness. He was the jazz critic for the New York Herald Tribune from 1957 to 1960. "A summer concert, lecture, and research tour of South Africa in 1959 was cut short because he encouraged black musicians, but while there he recorded with the group which was about to become the Jazz Epistles". His final recordings, as a trio, were made in 1960.

He wrote numerous books on jazz, including the Jazz Improvisation series, which sets out the basic principles of jazz, and was published between 1959 and 1965.

The American composer Leonard Bernstein dedicated a piano composition to Mehegan in his 1948 collection Four Anniversaries. Mehegan died in New Canaan, Connecticut, on April 3, 1984.

== Discography ==
- 1952 From Barrelhouse to Bop (Perspective)
- 1954 The First Mehegan (Savoy)
- 1955 The John Mehegan Trio/Quartet (Savoy) - with Charles Mingus & Kenny Clarke
- 1955 A Pair of Pianos (Savoy)- with Eddie Costa & Vinnie Burke
- 1956 How I Play Jazz Piano (Savoy)
- 1959 Casual Affair (T.J. Records)
- 1960 The Act of Jazz (Epic) - a lecture on various aspects of jazz improvisation, using "I Got Rhythm" to illustrate the aspects discussed.

With Chuck Wayne

- The Jazz Guitarist (Savoy, 1954 [1956])

== Techniques, studies & etudes for piano ==
- Contemporary Styles for the Jazz Pianist, in 3 books (1964–70)
- Famous Jazz Style Piano Folio - with instruction on how to play jazz piano (1958)
- Jazz Improvisation (1959-65)
    - Vol. 1: Tonal and rhythmic principles (1959)
    - Vol. 2: Jazz rhythm and the improvised line (1962)
    - Vol. 3: Swing and early progressive piano styles (1964)
    - Vol. 4: Contemporary piano styles (1965)
- The Jazz Pianist, in 3 books: Studies in the art and practice of jazz improvisation (1960–61)
- Styles for the Jazz Pianist, in 3 books (1962–63)
- Studies in Jazz Harmony (1962)
- Improvising Jazz Piano (1985, posthumous)

== Original compositions for piano ==
- Jazz Bourree (1960)
- Jazz Preludes (1962)
- Vienna Woodshed, a jazz waltz for piano 4-hands (1965)
- Jazz Caper, jazz originals for piano 4-hands (1965)
