= Eddie Costa, Mat Mathews & Don Elliott at Newport =

Live album by Eddie Costa / Mat Mathews / Don Elliott
- Released: 1957
- Recorded: July 5 & 6, 1957; Newport Jazz Festival, RI
- Genre: Jazz
- Label: Verve; MGV 8237
- Producer: Norman Granz

Eddie Costa chronology
The Eddie Costa - Vinnie Burke Trio (1956)	Eddie Costa, Mat Mathews & Don Elliott at Newport (1957)	Eddie Costa Quintet (1957)

Don Elliott chronology
Don Elliott at the Modern Jazz Room (1957)	Eddie Costa, Mat Mathews & Don Elliott at Newport (1957)	The Voices of Don Elliott (1957)

Professional ratings
Review scores
Source	Rating
Disc	2.5/5 stars

Eddie Costa, Mat Mathews & Don Elliott at Newport is a live album featuring performances by Eddie Costa's Trio/Quintet, Mat Mathews' Quartet and Don Elliott's Quartet recorded at the Newport Jazz Festival in 1957 and released on the Verve label.

== Track listing ==
1. "Taking a Chance on Love" (Vernon Duke, John La Touche, Ted Fetter)
2. "There'll Never Be Another You" (Harry Warren, Mack Gordon)
3. "I'll Remember April" (Gene de Paul, Patricia Johnston, Don Raye)
4. "I Never Knew" (Ted Fio Rito, Gus Kahn)
5. "Flamingo" (Ted Grouya, Edmund Anderson)
6. "Windmill Blues" (Mat Mathews)
7. "Dancing in the Dark" (Howard Dietz, Arthur Schwartz)
8. "I Love You" (Cole Porter)
9. "'S Wonderful" (George Gershwin, Ira Gershwin)
- Recorded at the Newport Jazz Festival, Newport, RI on July 5, 1957 (tracks 4–6) and July 6, 1957 (tracks 1–3 & 7–9)

== Personnel ==
=== Tracks 1–3 ===
- Eddie Costa – piano
- Rolf Kühn – clarinet (tracks 2 & 3)
- Dick Johnson – alto saxophone (tracks 2 & 3)
- Ernie Furtado – bass
- Al Beldini – drums

=== Tracks 4–6 ===
- Mat Mathews – accordion
- Hank Jones – piano
- Ernie Furtado – bass
- Johnny Cresci – drums

=== Tracks 7–9 ===
- Don Elliott – mellophone, vibraphone, bongos
- Bill Evans – piano
- Ernie Furtado – bass
- Al Beldini – drums
