= Mike Cuozzo =

American jazz saxophonist

- Also known as: Mighty Mike Cuozzo
- Born: Michael Antonio Cuozzo; June 12, 1925; Newark, New Jersey, U.S.
- Died: April 2, 2006 (aged 80) North Caldwell, New Jersey, U.S.
- Genre: Jazz
- Instruments: Tenor saxophone

Michael Antonio Cuozzo (June 12, 1925 – April 2, 2006) was an American jazz saxophonist and businessman.

== Early life ==
Cuozzo was born in Newark, New Jersey. He left high school to tour with Shep Fields and His Rippling Rhythm in the 1940s.

== Career ==
Cuozzo began his professional career as a tenor saxophonist in Joe Marsala's band. He played for the United Service Organizations in World War II, and was part of Elliot Lawrence's band in the early-1950s.

In November 1955, he led his own session, recording the album Mighty Mike Cuozzo for Savoy Records. Other personnel on the album were Eddie Costa (vibraphone), Ronnie Ball (piano), Vinnie Burke (bass) and Kenny Clarke (drums). Reviewer Marc Myers commented that Cuozzo had a "Ben Webster sound, and his smooth, inventive improvisational style on modernist tracks, blues and ballads was superb." He recorded again in March 1956, on bassist Mort Herbert's album Night People on Savoy. His final recording, again in 1956, was the album Mike Cuozzo with the Costa-Burke Trio, for Jubilee Records, on which he performed with Eddie Costa, Vinnie Burke, and drummer Nick Stabulas. Although Myers describes Cuozzo as "a strong, smart player", Cuozzo did not record again.

In 1957, Cuozzo set up a small housing development company in New Jersey with his brother. In 1970, he acquired and started managing an auto dealership franchise. His two albums, Mighty Mike Cuozzo and ...with the Costa-Burke Trio, were reissued on CD in the 1980s, and he continued to play saxophone in local clubs in Cedar Grove and West Orange, New Jersey, until the 1990s.

== Personal life ==
Cuozzo married in 1958 and thereafter declined invitations to join touring bands. He died in North Caldwell, New Jersey, in 2006, aged 80.
