= Guys and Dolls Like Vibes =

Studio album by Eddie Costa
- Released: 1958
- Recorded: January 15–17, 1958
- Genre: Jazz
- Label: Coral, Verve (reissue)
- Producer: Bryan Koniarz

Eddie Costa chronology
The Eddie Costa Quintet (1957)	Guys and Dolls Like Vibes (1958)	The House of Blue Lights (1959)

Professional ratings
Review scores
Source	Rating
AllMusic	4/5 stars
The Penguin Guide to Jazz	3/4 stars

Guys and Dolls Like Vibes is an album by Eddie Costa and his quartet, featuring pianist Bill Evans. It was recorded in 1958 and contains pieces from the 1950 musical Guys and Dolls.

== Music and recording ==
The album was recorded in January 1958. The quartet was led by Eddie Costa on vibraphone. He and the other musicians – pianist Bill Evans, bassist Wendell Marshall, and drummer Paul Motian – were not well known at the time, but went on to earn much greater attention. The material is from the musical Guys and Dolls. This was the first jazz album to use pieces from Frank Loesser's score. Peter Pettinger, in his biography of Evans, wrote that the solo space was shared equally between the two men, as was responsibility for arranging the tunes.

== Releases and reception ==
Guys and Dolls Like Vibes was released by Coral Records. Billboard in 1958 listed it as one of their "jazz special merit albums", describing is as "a swingin' set that could also draw pop buys. Costa continues to develop and expand. This is one of his best to date." Critic John S. Wilson, in another contemporaneous review, wrote that "the work of both Evans and Costa is diluted [...] by selections that are too long to be sustained by only two soloists."

The album was reissued on CD by Verve Records. Gary Giddins, in 2004, wrote that the reissued recording is "easily overlooked yet worthy of its second chance at life". The group, Giddins wrote, turn their version of "Adelaide" into a "near blues". The Penguin Guide to Jazz wrote: "Evans is still in his tough, boppish salad days, and when paired with Costa's equally brisk and searching solos the six Guys and Dolls themes come in for productive scrutiny." The AllMusic reviewer commented that "Costa and Evans mesh beautifully throughout, and Costa's solos are well crafted".

== Track listing ==
1. "Guys and Dolls" – 6:46
2. "Adelaide" – 8:29
3. "If I Were a Bell" – 5:10
4. "Luck Be a Lady" – 6:23
5. "I've Never Been in Love Before" – 7:00
6. "I'll Know" – 6:04

All music composed by Frank Loesser.

== Personnel ==
- Eddie Costa – vibraphone
- Bill Evans – piano
- Wendell Marshall – double bass
- Paul Motian – drums
