= Tal (album) =

Studio album by Tal Farlow
- Released: 1956
- Recorded: June, 1956
- Genre: Jazz
- Length: 46:58 (Reissue)
- Label: Norgran
- Producer: Norman Granz

Tal Farlow chronology
Guitar Player (1955)	Tal (1956)	Feurst Set (1956)

Professional ratings
Review scores
Source	Rating
Allmusic	4.5/5 stars
Disc	4/5 stars

Tal is an album by American jazz guitarist Tal Farlow, released in 1956.

Originally released on Norman Granz's Norgran label, it was subsequently released by Verve. It has been reissued by Verve again in 2001 and also on Universal Japan.

== Track listing ==
1. "Isn't It Romantic?" (Richard Rodgers, Lorenz Hart) – 10:15
2. "There Is No Greater Love" (Isham Jones, Marty Symes) – 4:00
3. "How About You?" (Burton Lane, Ralph Freed) – 6:06
4. "Anything Goes" (Cole Porter) – 5:12
5. "Yesterdays" (Jerome Kern, Otto Harbach) – 5:56
6. "You Don't Know What Love Is" (Gene de Paul, Don Raye) – 4:24
7. "Chuckles" (Clark Terry) – 5:00
8. "Broadway" (Billy Bird, Teddy McRae, Henri Woode) – 6:19

== Personnel ==
- Tal Farlow – guitar
- Eddie Costa – piano
- Vinnie Burke – bass

Production notes:

- Norman Granz – producer
- Hiroshi Itsuno – reissue preparation
- Herman Leonard – cover photo
- Kikuo Niikura – mastering
