= Chromatic Palette =

Studio album by Tal Farlow
- Released: 1981
- Recorded: January 1981
- Genre: Jazz
- Length: 37:34
- Label: Concord Jazz

Tal Farlow chronology
On Stage (1981)	Chromatic Palette (1981)	Cookin' on all Burners (1983)

Professional ratings
Review scores
Source	Rating
Allmusic	4/5 stars
The Penguin Guide to Jazz Recordings	3.5/4 stars

Chromatic Palette is an album by American jazz guitarist Tal Farlow, released in 1981.

== Track listing ==
1. "All Alone" (Irving Berlin) – 4:09
2. "Nuages" (Django Reinhardt) – 5:53
3. "I Hear a Rhapsody" (George Fragos, Jack Baker, Dick Gasparre) – 3:19
4. "If I Were a Bell" (Frank Loesser) – 4:48
5. "St. Thomas" (Sonny Rollins) – 4:14
6. "Blue Art, Too" (Tal Farlow) – 5:16
7. "Stella by Starlight" (Victor Young, Ned Washington) – 4:27
8. "One for My Baby (and One More for the Road)" (Harold Arlen, Johnny Mercer) – 5:28

== Personnel ==
- Tal Farlow – guitar
- Tommy Flanagan – piano
- Gary Mazzaroppi – bass
