= Dick Johnson (clarinetist) =

American big band clarinetist

- Born: Richard Brown Johnson; December 1, 1925; Brockton, Massachusetts
- Died: January 10, 2010 (aged 84) Boston, Massachusetts
- Genres: Modern jazz
- Occupation: Jazz musician
- Instruments: Clarinet, alto saxophone, flute

Richard Brown Johnson (December 1, 1925 – January 10, 2010) was an American big band clarinetist, best known for his work with the Artie Shaw Band. From 1983 until his death he was the leader of the Artie Shaw Orchestra.

Born in Brockton, Massachusetts, he also played the alto saxophone and flute. Johnson worked with Frank Sinatra, the Swing Shift Orchestra, Dizzy Gillespie and Tony Bennett.

Johnson died in Boston, Massachusetts after a short illness, aged 84.

== Discography ==
- 1956: Music for Swinging Moderns (EmArcy)
- 1957: Most Likely (Riverside) with Dave McKenna, Wilbur Ware, Philly Joe Jones
- 1957: At Newport (Verve) with Eddie Costa
- 1973: Cookin'At Michael's Pub (Prevue) with Dave McKenna
- 1979: Dick Johnson Plays Alto Sax & Flute & Soprano Sax & Clarinet (Concord) with Dave McKenna, Bob Maize, Jake Hanna
- 1980: Live at Bovi's (Argonne) with Duke Belaire Jazz Orchestra
- 1980: Spider's Blues (Concord) with Dave McKenna
- 1981: Swing Shift (Concord)
- 1982: Everybody Eats When They Come to My House (Soap) with Razmataz
- 2004: Artie's Choice! and the Naturals
- 2006: Star Dust & Beyond: A Tribute to Artie Shaw
