= Freddie Webster =

American jazz trumpeter (1917–1947)

- Born: Freddie Webster; September 3, 1917; Cleveland, Ohio, U.S.
- Died: April 1, 1947 (aged 29) Chicago, Illinois, U.S.
- Genres: Jazz
- Occupation: Musician
- Instrument: Trumpet

Freddie Webster (September 3, 1917 – April 1, 1947) was a jazz trumpeter who, Dizzy Gillespie once said, "had the best sound on trumpet since the trumpet was invented--just alive and full of life." He is perhaps best known for being cited by Miles Davis as an early influence. Bebop figure Babs Gonzales recalled that "Freddie [was] the best trumpet player I ever heard in my life. Until his death, Freddie was never understood; yet he was a great musician: Miles owes his sound to him."

Webster was born in Cleveland, Ohio. He led his own band, which toured Ohio, before moving to New York City in the late 1930s. In New York City he worked with Benny Carter, Cab Calloway, Earl Hines, Jimmie Lunceford, Billy Eckstine, and others. He also accompanied singer Sarah Vaughan and did two versions of his own song "Reverse the Charges".

He died of a heart attack in a room at Chicago's Strode Hotel; a heroin overdose was suspected in his death. In his autobiography, Miles, Davis stated his belief that Webster was the unwitting victim of a murder attempt on saxophonist Sonny Stitt. According to Davis, Stitt, who at that time was addicted to heroin, had "been beating everybody out of their money" [meaning cheating them, not physically assaulting them] in order to get money to support his habit. Davis believed that one of those people, out for revenge, had given Stitt heroin deliberately laced with something poisonous, possibly battery acid or strychnine, and then Stitt had unknowingly passed the poisoned heroin on to Webster.

== Tributes ==
- Sonny Rollins's 1956 album Saxophone Colossus includes a song titled "Strode Rode", which is a reference to the hotel where Freddie Webster died.
