= Vinnie Burke =

American jazz musician

Vinnie Burke (born Vincenzo Bucci) (March 15, 1921 – February 1, 2001) was an American jazz bassist born in Newark, New Jersey.

Burke played violin and guitar early in life, but he lost the use of his little finger in a munitions factory accident and switched to double bass. In the second half of the 1940s he played with Joe Mooney, Tony Scott, and Cy Coleman. Later, he played with the Sauter-Finegan Orchestra, Tal Farlow, Marian McPartland, Don Elliott, Vic Dickenson, Gil Mellé, Bucky Pizzarelli, John Mehegan, Chris Connor, Eddie Costa, and Bobby Hackett. He led his own band in 1956 and led small combos into the 1980s.

== Discography ==
=== As leader ===
- East Coast Jazz/2 (Bethlehem, 1955)
- The Vinnie Burke All-Stars (ABC-Paramount, 1956)
- Vinnie Burke's String Jazz Quartet (ABC-Paramount, 1957)
- Bass by Pettiford/Burke (Bethlehem, 1957)

=== As sideman ===
With Chris Connor

- Sings Lullabys for Lovers (Bethlehem, 1954)
- Sings Lullabys of Birdland (Bethlehem, 1956)
- Chris Connor Sings the George Gershwin Almanac of Song (Atlantic, 1957)

With Tal Farlow

- Tal (Verve, 1956)
- The Swinging Guitar of Tal Farlow (Verve, 1957)
- Fuerst Set (Xanadu, 1975)
- Second Set (Xanadu, 1977)

With others

- Manny Albam, The Blues Is Everybody's Business (Coral, 1958)
- Eddie Costa, Eddie Costa/Vinnie Burke Trio (Jubilee, 1956)
- Bill Cullen, Bill Cullen's Minstrel Spectacular (ABC-Paramount, 1959)
- Mike Cuozzo, Mighty Mike Cuozzo (Savoy, 1955)
- Mike Cuozzo, Mike Cuozzo with the Costa Burke Trio (Jubilee, 1956)
- Don Elliott, A Musical Offering by Don Elliott (ABC-Paramount, 1956)
- Urbie Green, All About Urbie Green and His Big Band (ABC-Paramount, 1955)
- George Handy, Handyland U.S.A. ("X", 1954)
- Coleman Hawkins, Bean and the Boys (HighNote, 2001)
- Marian McPartland, In Concert (Jazz Heritage, 1993)
- Marian McPartland, On 52nd Street (Savoy, 2000)
- John Mehegan & Eddie Costa, A Pair of Pianos (Savoy, 1955)
- Gil Melle, Gil's Guests (Prestige, 1956)
- Bucky Pizzarelli, Music Minus Many Men (Savoy, 1960)
- Joe Puma, Joe Puma (Bethlehem, 1955)
- Eddie Shu, I Only Have Eyes for Shu (Bethlehem, 1955)
- Eddie Shu, Jazz Practitioners (Bethlehem, 1957)
- Carol Sloane, Hush-a-Bye (SSJ, 2009)
- Lennie Tristano & Marian McPartland, The Jazz Keyboards (Savoy, 1955)
- Chuck Wayne, The Jazz Guitarist (Savoy, 1956)
