= Tal Farlow =

American jazz guitarist (1921–1998)

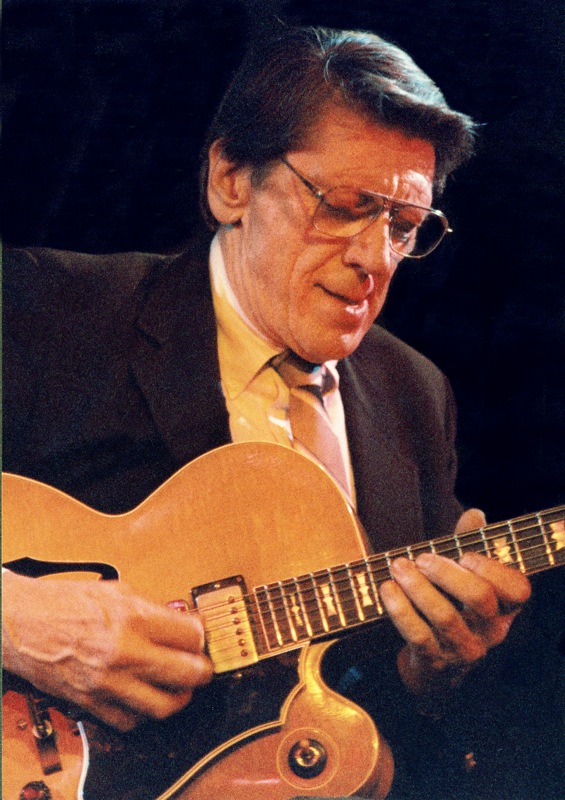

Background information
- Born: Talmage Holt Farlow; June 7, 1921; Greensboro, North Carolina, U.S.
- Origin: New York City
- Died: July 25, 1998 (aged 77) New York City, U.S.
- Genre: Jazz
- Occupation: Musician
- Instrument: Guitar
- Years active: Late 1940s–1998
- Labels: Norgran, Verve, Xanadu, Prestige, Blue Note, Concord
- Formerly of: Red Norvo, Artie Shaw, Great Guitars

Talmage Holt Farlow (June 7, 1921 – July 25, 1998) was an American jazz guitarist. He was nicknamed "Octopus" because of how his large, quick hands spread over the fretboard.

== Early life and education ==
Talmage Holt Farlow was born in Greensboro, North Carolina. He taught himself how to play guitar, which he started when he was 22 years old. He learned chord melodies by playing a mandolin tuned like a ukulele. He said playing the ukulele was the reason he used the higher four strings on the guitar for the melody and chord structure, with the two bottom strings for bass counterpoint, which he played with his thumb. His only professional training was as an apprentice sign painter. He requested the night shift so he could listen to big band standards on the shop radio. He listened to Bix Beiderbecke, Louis Armstrong, and Eddie Lang.

== Career ==
=== Music ===
Farlow's career was inspired by hearing Charlie Christian playing electric guitar with the Benny Goodman band. He stated he made his own electric guitar because he could not afford to purchase one.

Farlow employed artificial harmonics and tapped his guitar for percussion, creating a flat, snare drum sound or a hollow backbeat like the bongos. His large, quick hands earned him the nickname "The Octopus".

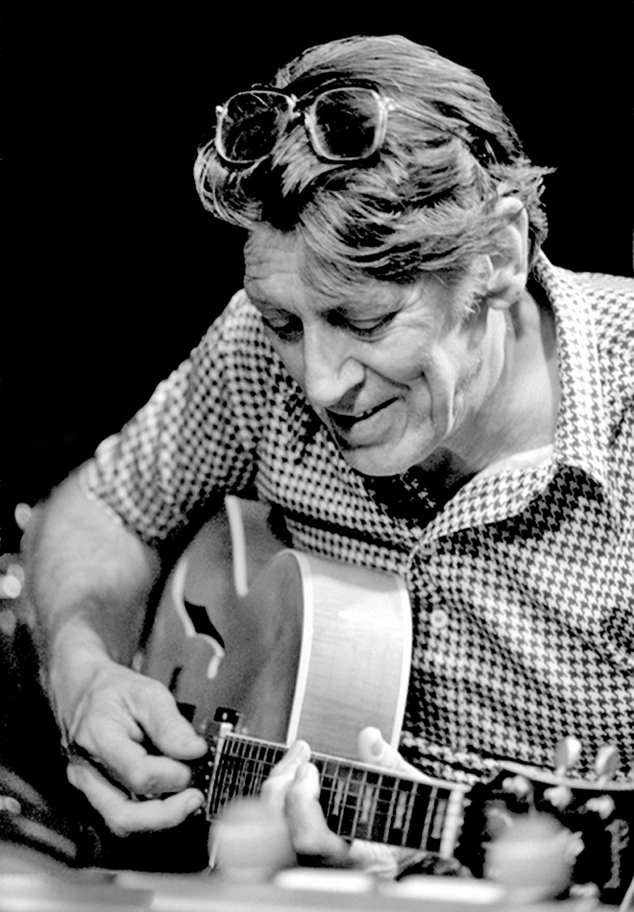
Tal Farlow at Keystone Korner, San Francisco, playing with Red Norvo, July 28, 1981

He caught the public's attention in 1949 when he was in a trio with Red Norvo and Charles Mingus. In 1953, he was a member of the Gramercy Five led by Artie Shaw, and two years later he led his own trio with Vinnie Burke and Eddie Costa in New York City. After getting married in 1958, he partially retired and settled in Sea Bright, New Jersey, returning to a career as a sign painter. He continued to play occasional dates in local clubs. In 1962 the Gibson Guitar Corporation, with Farlow's participation, produced the "Tal Farlow" model. In 1976, Farlow started recording again. A documentary about him was released in 1981.

=== Later career and death ===
Later in his career, Farlow performed as a member of Great Guitars with a DVD released in 2005 after his death.

Farlow died of esophageal cancer at Memorial Sloan-Kettering Cancer Center in New York City on July 25, 1998, at the age of 77.

== Style and influence ==
Steve Rochinski notes: "Of all the guitarists to emerge in the first generation after Charlie Christian, Tal Farlow, more than any other, has been able to move beyond the rhythmic, melodic, and harmonic vocabulary associated with the early electric guitar master. Tal's incredible speed, long, weaving lines, rhythmic excitement, highly developed harmonic sense, and enormous reach (both physical and musical) have enabled him to create a style that clearly stands apart from the rest." Where guitarists of his day combined rhythmic chords with linear melodies, Farlow placed single notes together in clusters, varying between harmonically enriched tones. The music historian Stuart Nicholson stated that "In terms of guitar prowess, it was the equivalent of Roger Bannister breaking the four-minute mile."

== Discography ==
=== As leader ===
- Autumn in New York (Verve, 1954)
- Tal Farlow Quartet (Blue Note, 1954)
- The Tal Farlow Album (Norgran, 1954)
- The Artistry of Tal Farlow (Norgran, 1954)
- The Interpretations of Tal Farlow (Norgran, 1955)
- A Recital by Tal Farlow (Norgran, 1955)
- Tal (Norgran, 1956)
- The Swinging Guitar of Tal Farlow (Verve, 1957)
- This Is Tal Farlow (Verve, 1958)
- The Guitar Artistry of Tal Farlow (Verve, 1959)
- Tal Farlow Plays the Music of Harold Arlen (Verve, 1960)
- The Return of Tal Farlow (Prestige, 1969)
- Guitar Player (Prestige, 1974)
- Fuerst Set (Xanadu, 1975)
- Trinity (CBS/Sony, 1977)
- A Sign of the Times (Concord Jazz, 1977)
- Second Set (Xanadu, 1977)
- Tal Farlow '78 (Concord Jazz, 1978)
- Chromatic Palette (Concord Jazz, 1981)
- On Stage with Hank Jones, Red Norvo (Concord Jazz, 1981)
- Cookin' on all Burners (Concord Jazz, 1983)
- The Legendary Tal Farlow (Concord Jazz, 1985)
- All Strings Attached with John Abercrombie, Larry Carlton, Larry Coryell (Verve, 1987)
- At Ed Fuerst's (Xanadu, 1988) (Note: Ed Fuerst (aka Ed Furst; né Edward Louis Fuerst; 1912–1994) was a second generation insurance broker – born and raised in Manhattan and educated at Cornell – and a jazz lover who promoted and invested in jazz musicians, including Gene Williams. He also had managed George Shearing. The above two recordings were at his apartment in Manhattan.)
- Standards Recital with Philippe Petit (FD Music, 1991)
- Chance Meeting with Lenny Breau (Guitarchives, 1997)
- Complete 1956 Private Recordings (Definitive, 2002)

=== As sideman ===
With Buddy DeFranco

- Sweet and Lovely (Verve, 1956)
- Cooking the Blues (Verve, 1958)
- The Great Encounter (Progressive, 1977)
- Like Someone in Love (Progressive, 1980)

With Red Norvo

- Red Norvo Trio Vol. 1 (Discovery, 1951)
- Red Norvo Trio Vol. 2 (Discovery, 1953)
- Move! (Savoy, 1956)
- Red Norvo with Strings (Fantasy, 1956)

With others

- Cephas & Wiggins, Flip, Flop, & Fly (Flying Fish, 1992)
- Cephas & Wiggins, Somebody Told the Truth (Alligator, 2002)
- Sonny Criss, Up, Up and Away (Prestige, 1967)
- Howard McGhee, Howard McGhee Vol. 2 (Blue Note, 1953)
- Gil Melle, New Faces, New Sounds (Blue Note, 1953)
- Gil Melle, Vol. 2 (Blue Note, 1953)
- Metronome All-Stars, Metronome All-Stars 1956 (Clef, 1956)
- Sam Most, Mostly Flute (Xanadu, 1976)
- Anita O'Day, An Evening with Anita O'Day (Norgran, 1955)
- Anita O'Day, Anita O'Day Swings Cole Porter with Billy May (Verve, 1991)
- Oscar Pettiford, Oscar Pettiford Sextet (BMG, 1964)
- Artie Shaw, I Can't Get Started (Verve, 1956)
- George Shearing & Red Norvo, Midnight On Cloud 69 (Savoy, 1956)
- Clark Terry, Clark Terry (Verve, 1997)
- George Wein, George Wein's Newport All-Stars (Atlantic, 1969)
- Mary Lou Williams, The London Sessions Original Vogue Masters (BMG, 1997)
