= Eddie Costa =

American jazz musician (1930–1962)

- Born: Edwin James Costa; August 14, 1930; Atlas, Pennsylvania, U.S.
- Died: July 28, 1962 (aged 31) New York City, New York, U.S.
- Genre: Jazz
- Occupations: Musician, composer, arranger
- Instruments: Piano; vibraphone
- Years active: Late 1940s–1962
- Labels: Coral; Dot; Josie; Verve

Edwin James Costa (August 14, 1930 – July 28, 1962) was an American jazz pianist, vibraphonist, composer and arranger. In 1957, he was chosen as DownBeat jazz critics' new star on piano and vibes – the first time that one artist won two categories in the same year. He became known for his percussive, driving piano style that concentrated on the lower octaves of the keyboard.

Costa had an eight-year recording career, during which he appeared on more than 100 albums; five of these were under his own leadership. As a sideman, he appeared in orchestras led by Manny Albam, Gil Evans, Woody Herman and others; played in smaller groups led by musicians including Tal Farlow, Coleman Hawkins, Gunther Schuller, and Phil Woods; and accompanied vocalists including Tony Bennett and Chris Connor. Costa died, aged 31, in a car accident in New York City.

== Early life ==
Eddie Costa was born in Atlas, Pennsylvania, near Mount Carmel, in Northumberland County. He was taught and influenced on piano by his older, musically trained brother, Bill, and a local piano teacher. Eddie took paid jobs as a pianist from the age of 15. In contrast to his piano training, he was self-taught on vibes. In 1949, Costa played and toured for a few months with violinist Joe Venuti. He then worked for his brother in New York until, in 1951, Costa was drafted into the army. During his time in the armed forces, Costa performed in Japan and Korea. Upon release after two years, Costa again worked around the New York area, including for bands led by Kai Winding, Johnny Smith, and Don Elliott.

== Playing and recording career ==
=== 1954–1957 ===
In 1954, Costa made his first recordings, with guitarist Sal Salvador, to whom he had been recommended by trombonist Winding. The first of these sessions, in July, featured one of Costa's compositions, "Round Trip". The following year, Costa recorded a series of piano duets with John Mehegan; differences in playing style meant that several rehearsals were required to organize which pianist would be responsible for what aspects of the performances.

Costa's first recording as leader was in 1956, with his trio featuring bassist Vinnie Burke and drummer Nick Stabulas. This was released under slightly differing titles by Josie Records and Jubilee Records, and was well received: critic John S. Wilson, for instance, commented on the "roaring, spitting piano solos by Eddie Costa". Around this time, Costa was nicknamed "The Bear" by Burke for his powerful playing. Also in 1956, Costa and Burke joined guitarist Tal Farlow, forming a resident trio to play at the Composer, a club on West 58th Street in New York. Farlow's comment on the absence of a drummer from the trio was that "Eddie's feeding, comping or whatever you want to call it was so fierce that there was no doubt at all where the time was, so I didn't miss the drums at all". The trio stayed together, recording several albums under Farlow's name, until, in 1958, the Composer closed. Costa was often in recording studios as a sideman around this time: he appeared on approximately 20 albums in both 1956 and 1957. These included small group settings with Herbie Mann, Oscar Pettiford, and Phil Woods, and accompanying vocalists such as Tony Bennett and Chris Connor.

In 1957, Costa was again leader, recording Eddie Costa Quintet with Woods, Art Farmer, Teddy Kotick, and Paul Motian. Their repertoire featured interpretations of "I Didn't Know What Time It Was" and Dave Brubeck's recent composition "In Your Own Sweet Way"; the latter focused on Costa's vibes and Farmer's muted trumpet, with Woods switching from his usual alto saxophone to the piano. The Billboard review was positive, calling it "a first rate jazz set" on which "Costa swings as ever on piano". A trio appearance at the 1957 Newport Jazz Festival also brought Costa greater attention. Some of his playing at the festival – as a trio with Ernie Furtado (bass) and Al Beldini (drums), and as a quintet with the addition of Rolf Kühn and Dick Johnson – was released later in 1957 as part of a Verve album. Billboard commented that "Costa [...] will attract many new endorsers with the musicianship displayed".

=== 1958–1962 ===
Costa's next recording as leader, this time exclusively on vibes, was 1958's Guys and Dolls Like Vibes, recorded over three sessions in January, with Bill Evans, Wendell Marshall and Motian. This album contained six songs from the show Guys and Dolls, which was familiar to listeners from the musical and film versions that had opened a few years earlier. From 1958 to 1959, Costa was with Woody Herman's band on and off, including as part of a sextet. Over these two years, Costa continued recording prolifically, including in orchestras led by Herman, Manny Albam (one album, A Gallery of Gershwin, included a piano quartet of Costa, the unrelated Johnny Costa, Hank Jones, and Dick Marx), Michel Legrand, and Ernie Wilkins. Costa's final recording as leader was The House of Blue Lights, a piano trio album with Marshall and Motian, in 1959. Billboard was again positive, highlighting Costa's "highly inventive and imaginative piano stylings". After this, although he continued to play in clubs such as the Half Note on Hudson Street, Costa concentrated mainly on studio work, on both piano and vibes, for other leaders. He was much in demand for recording sessions because of the excellence of his sight-reading and playing on both of his instruments.

The quantity of studio work created a conflict between Costa's need and desire to support his family, sometimes achieved through working day and night in studios, and his belief in developing his jazz talents, which would have required playing more in clubs and dealing with the people – agents, club owners, artists and repertoire men, and so on – whose goals seldom matched those of creative musicians. Examples of Costa's studio work from this period are being part of Gigi Gryce's final recordings as leader, appearances on Gunther Schuller's Third Stream album Jazz Abstractions, a series of small-group recordings with saxophonist Coleman Hawkins, and two tracks of Shelly Manne's 2-3-4, with Costa featured on piano for one track and vibes on the other, both with just George Duvivier and Manne. Costa also contributed on vibes to Gryce's music for Fred Baker's short dance film On the Sound. A long association with pianist and arranger Ralph Sharon meant that Costa was the vibraphonist in the Sharon orchestra on June 9, 1962, when it played with Bennett at Carnegie Hall. Costa's final recording session was on July 12, 1962, as part of a group assembled by saxophonist Al Cohn mainly from the Benny Goodman band that had toured the Soviet Union earlier that year.

Late at night on July 28, 1962, Costa was killed in a car crash, involving no other vehicles, on New York's Westside Highway at 72nd Street. He was survived by his wife and four children. This loss to music was summarized years later in the liner notes to one of his recordings: "No pianist with his combination of strength, humor, and drive has developed in the sixties or seventies, and as the years go by it becomes more apparent that we lost a unique creative musician". In his eight-year recording career, Costa appeared on more than 100 albums. He never recorded a solo album.

== Playing style ==
Costa's overall style allowed him to play in a great variety of settings. According to critic Alun Morgan, "his mind was never cluttered up with thoughts of stylistic divisions. He was at home with any jazz group, provided it swung and generated a feeling of happiness". On piano, his "trademark sound", remarked Ken Dryden, "was the emphasis of the middle and lower registers while nearly ignoring the top two octaves". Some of Costa's more linear, right-hand playing was influenced by his listening to Bud Powell records while in the army. Costa's playing was more than just one-handed lines: during a period when the typical approach to jazz piano was to concentrate on right-hand solos while adding only basic left-hand support, Costa used both hands in creating his own vigorous sound. His piano playing on the informally recorded album Fuerst Set is typical of his style; it was later described by critic Whitney Balliett:

Each improvisation resembled an excellent drum solo in its rhythmic intensity, pattern of beats, and elements of surprise. Costa liked to use octave chords in the left hand and single-note lines in the right, and he liked to thunder endlessly down in the lower registers of the piano. At such times, he played chords in both hands and with stunning effect. He would let loose a staccato passage and then an impossible two-handed arpeggio, or he would deliver on-the-beat or offbeat chords – seesawing them, making them into sixty-fourth notes, somehow slurring them, and developing great drive and momentum.

On vibes, Costa's style was somewhat different. John S. Wilson commented in 1959 that "In contrast to the stirring forays into the lower register that he is fond of making on piano, Costa's vibraphone style is light and dancing, closer to the Red Norvo manner than most current vibists." After Costa's death, Alun Morgan also compared his playing on the two instruments: "As a vibraphonist Eddie carried over the pulsating elements of his piano style but also continued to employ a sensitive gradation of touch where necessary".

== Recognition ==
Costa was chosen as DownBeat jazz critics' new star on piano and vibes for 1957; this was the first time that one artist had won two categories in the same year. In 1962, he was invited to play at the first International Jazz Festival in Washington, D.C. by the President's Music Committee of the People to People program. An indication of the esteem in which Costa was held by musicians is the caliber of those who performed at his memorial concert at The Village Gate on October 8, 1962: Charlie Byrd, Al Cohn, Art Farmer, Benny Golson, Jim Hall, Coleman Hawkins, Mundell Lowe, Zoot Sims and Clark Terry were among those who played. The playing of the bands led by Hawkins and Terry was recorded and released as an LP. Hawkins did not usually play at benefit concerts, but his feelings for Costa meant that he did what he could to make the seven-hour event a success.

== Discography ==
=== As leader ===
Year recorded	Title	Label	Notes
1956	Eddie Costa/Vinnie Burke Trio	Josie	Trio, with Vinnie Burke (bass), Nick Stabulas (drums)
1957	Eddie Costa, Mat Mathews & Don Elliott at Newport	Verve	Trio, with Ernie Furtado (bass), Al Beldini (drums); quintet also with Rolf Kühn (clarinet), Dick Johnson (alto sax); in concert; shared with other bands
1957	Eddie Costa Quintet	Interlude	Quintet, with Phil Woods (alto sax), Art Farmer (trumpet), Teddy Kotick (bass), Paul Motian (drums)
1958	Guys and Dolls Like Vibes	Coral/Verve	Quartet, with Bill Evans (piano), Wendell Marshall (bass), Paul Motian (drums); Costa plays only vibes
1959	The House of Blue Lights	Dot	Trio, with Wendell Marshall (bass), Paul Motian (drums)
