= Ale Möller =

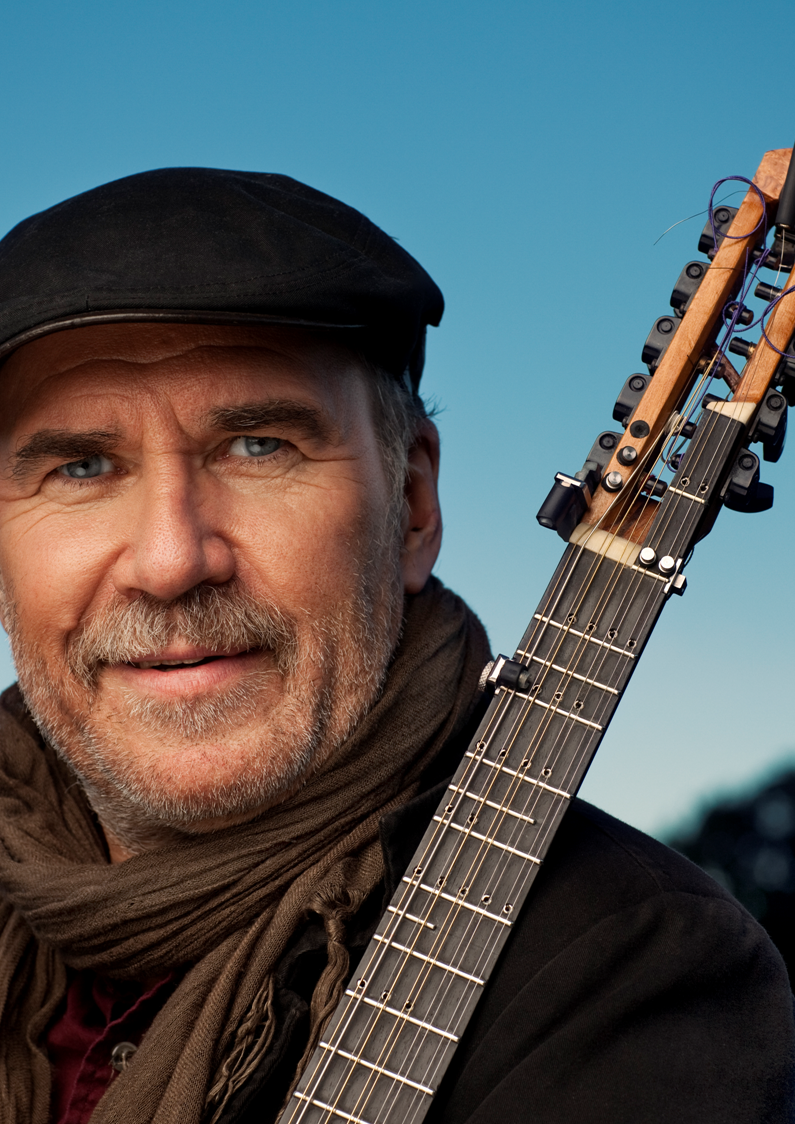
- Ale Möller

Background information
- Born: Arild Staffan Möller; 26 March 1955 (age 70); Scania, Sweden
- Genres: World music, Folk music, Jazz
- Occupations: Musician, composer
- Instruments: Mandola, Trumpet, Flutes, Accordion, keyboards
- Years active: 1977–present
- Labels: Supertraditional Records
- Website: alemoller.com

Arild Staffan Möller (born 26 March 1955), known professionally as Ale Möller, is a Swedish musician and composer.

He was born and grew up in Scania in southern Sweden and started in music as a jazz trumpeter. He lived for a while in Greece where he learned to play the bouzouki and played with composer Mikis Theodorakis. Möller has been a member of Frifot, Stockholm Folk Big Band, Enteli, Filarfolket, Ale Möller's Lyckliga Enmansorkester, and Neo Minore. He has worked with Aly Bain, Bruce Molsky, Robin Williamson, Gunnar Stubseid, Lena Willemark, Per Gudmundson, Jonas Knutsson, Sten Källman, and Thomas Ringdahl.

He plays traditional Scandinavian music. He is also a notable proponent of world music, combining Swedish folk traditions with those of Shetland, Greece, India, and West Africa. He plays bouzouki, mandola, accordion, flute, shawm, dulcimer, harp, and harmonica. His mandola is adapted to include extra frets.

== Discography ==
- 1980 – Filarfolket – Birfilarmusik från Malmö (Amalthea)
- 1981 – Neo Minore – Grekisk – svensk musik (Greek–Swedish Music) (Amalthea)
- 1982 – Filarfolket – Utan tvekan (Amalthea)
- 1983 – Filarfolket – Hönsafötter och Gulerötter (Amalthea)
- 1984 – Ale Möllers Lyckliga Enmansorkester – Dragspelsmusik från Uppsalaslätten (Urspår)
- 1985 – Filarfolket – Live (Amalthea)
- 1986 – Ale Möller – Bouzoukispelman (Giga)
- 1987 – Ale Möller/Gunnar Stubseid – Rammeslåtten (Sir Music)
- 1988 – Filarfolket – Smuggel (Amalthea,)
- 1988 – Ale Möllers Lyckliga Emmansorkester – Kompassmusik Vol. 1 (Ding–Dong)
- 1990 – Möller, Berglund, Brändström, Sörlin – Härjedalspipan (NAD)
- 1991 – Möller, Willemark, Gudmundson – Frifot (Caprice)
- 1993 – Frifot – Musique des vallées Scandinaves (Music of Scandinavian Valleys) (OCORA)
- 1993 – Filarfolket – Vintervals (Resource)
- 1994 – Enteli – Enteli (Phono Suecia)
- 1994 – Ale Möller/Lena Willemark – Nordan (ECM)
- 1994 – Möller, Källman & Ringdahl – Vind (Xource)
- 1995 – Enteli – Sagan om Ringen (SR)
- 1996 – Ale Möller – Hästen och Tranan (The Horse and the Crane) (Amigo; ACT Music; Northside)
- 1996 – Ale Möller/Lena Willemark – Agram (ECM)
- 1996 – Frifot – Järven (Caprice)
- 1997 – Enteli – Live (Amigo)
- 1997 – Ale Möller/Gunnar Stubseid – Reisaren (Heilo)
- 1999 – Stockholm Folk Big Band – Latitudes Crossing (Atrium/Warner2)
- 1999 – Frifot – Frifot – (ECM)
- 2000 – Stockholm Folk Big Band – Krokodilfiolen (Alfabeta)
- 2001 – Ale Möller/Aly Bain – Fully Rigged (Whirlie)
- 2003 – Frifot – Sluring (Amigo)
- 2004 – Ale Möller Band – Bodjal (Amigo)
- 2005 – Ale Möller/Louise Hoffsten – Jul i Folkton (Amigo)
- 2007 – Ale Möller/Aly Bain – Beyond The Stacks (Whirlie)
- 2007 – Ale Möller Band – Djef Djel (Amigo)
- 2007 – Frifot – Flyt (Amigo)
- 2012 – Ale Möller Band – Argai (Playground Music)
- 2013 – Ale Möller / Bohuslan Big Band – Pegasus (Prophone)
- 2024 – Ale Möller med Mats Öberg & Olle Linder – Andras (Supertraditional)

=== As guest ===
- 1977 - Mikael Wiehe & Kabaréorkestern - Sjömansvisor (MNW/Amalthea, MNW 82)
- 1978 - Thomas Wiehe - Två Vindar (Silence, SRS 4650)
- 1979 - Mikis Theodorakis & Collegium Musicum - To Axion Esti (Folksång, FRS 1004)
- 1979 - Mikael Wiehe & Kabaréorkestern - Elden är lös (Amalthea AM 10)
- 1989 - Simon Simonssons Kvartett - Längs gamla stigar (Giga, GLP 15)
- 1989 - Lena Willemark - När som gräset det vajar (Amigo, AMLP722)
- 1990 - Mari Boine-Persen - Gula Gula (Real World, CD RW 13)
- 1991 - Kalle Moraeus - Kalle Moraeus (Mono Music, MMCD 007)
- 1992 - Ted Ström - 1000 & Ett Liv (MNW, MNWCD 226)
- 1992 - Gina Jacobi - Det här är bara början (EMI 1364732)
- 1994 - Hector Zazou - Chansons de mers froides (Columbia, COL 477585 2)
- 1997 - Jonas Knutsson - Malgomaj (Atrium/Warner, 0630-17710-2)
- 1998 - Johan Hedin - Angel archipelago (Atrium/Warner 3984-22107-2)
- 1999 - Bengt Berger Old School - All Time High (Amigo, AMCD 885)
- 2000 - Ulf Lundell - I ett vinterlandskap (EMI 7243 53027772 8)
- 2001 - E-Type - Euro IV ever (Stockholm Records, 016 355-2)
- 2002 - Robin Williamson - Skirting The River Road (ECM, ECM 1785 016 372-2)
- 2002 - Harv - Tröst (Drone, DROCD 028)
- 2003 - Jeanette Lindström - Walk (Amigo AMCD 895)
- 2004 - Kato Kanako - Kato Kanako (Stubborn Records, STBR 3002)
- 2005 - Sofia Karlsson - Svarta Ballader (Amigo, AMCD 756)
- 2005 - Haugaard & Højrup - Gæstebud (Go Denmark, GO 0705)
