= Xieyi =

Xieyi, an atonal pinyin romanization of various Chinese words, may refer to:

- Xièyī (clothing) (t 褻衣, s 亵衣), a form of lingerie in ancient China, related to the dudou
- Xiěyì (painting) (t 寫意, s 写意), or freehand brush work, a form of traditional Chinese painting
- Xieyi (album), a 2001 album by Anders Jormin
