= Branislav Lala Kovačev =

Yugoslavian-Serbian jazz musician

- Kovačev in 1980, photo by Dorman Laszlo

Background information
- Birth name: Branislav Kovačev
- Also known as: Lala Kovačev, Lala Kovacev
- Born: November 19, 1939; Kikinda, Serbia
- Died: September 2, 2012 (aged 72); Hvar, Croatia
- Genres: Jazz, modal jazz, fusion, ethno jazz
- Occupation(s): Musician (drummer, bandleader, composer).
- Instrument: Drums
- Years active: 1956-2009
- Formerly of: Horst Jankowski, Chick Corea, Hans Koller, Albert Mangelsdorff, Wolfgang Dauner, Alan Skidmore, Michal Urbaniak, Benny Bailey, Duško Gojković, European Jazz Consensus, International Jazz Consensus, Lala Kovacev Group
- Website: http://www.lalakovacev.com

Branislav Lala Kovačev (Serbian Cyrillic: Бранислав „Лала" Ковачев; November 19, 1939 in Kikinda, Serbia – September 2, 2012 in Hvar, Croatia) was a Yugoslavian-Serbian jazz musician, drummer, bandleader and composer. Widely considered a key figure in the history of Balkan Ethno jazz. As a leader of European Jazz Consensus, International Jazz Consensus and Lala Kovacev Group, he developed a distinguished fusion style by integrating complex rhythmic structures from Balkan folk music into jazz.

== Biography ==
He showed interest in music at a young age, playing trumpet first and soon turning to drums. Largely self-taught, Lala Kovačev began his professional career as a member of the Dixieland Ensemble Dinamo when he was 17, and within two years he became the youngest member of the Radio Belgrade Jazz Orchestra led by Vojislav Simić. He moved to Germany in the mid-1960s and spent six years performing with Horst Jankowski internationally. From 1974 to 1975 he played with Max Greger in Munich and with the North German Radio Orchestra in Hanover. During this period he was collaborating with Chick Corea, Hans Koller, Janusz Muniak, Zbigniew Seifert, Albert Mangelsdorff, Wolfgang Dauner, Alan Skidmore, Boško Petrović, Michal Urbaniak, Duško Gojković and Benny Bailey.

In the early-1970s Kovačev formed European Jazz Consensus with Alan Skidmore, Gerd Dudek and Adelhard Roidinger. This avant-garde jazz group released two albums: Four for Slavia (1977) and Morning Rise (1977). International Jazz Consensus came as continuation of the first quartet and released one album Beak To Beak (1981) featuring Allan Praskin, Adelhard Roidinger and John Thomas. Lala Kovacev Group was created following year and released three albums: Balkan Impressions (1982), Balkan Impressions Vol.2 (1983) and Izvorni Folklor i Jazz (1985).

== Discography ==
=== As leader ===
- 1977: Four for Slavia - European Jazz Consensus (Electrola)
- 1977: Morning Rise - European Jazz Consensus (EGO Records)
- 1981: Beak To Beak - International Jazz Consensus (Nimbus)
- 1982: Balkan Impressions - Lala Kovacev Group (RTB 21220992)
- 1983: Balkan Impressions Vol.2 - Lala Kovacev Group (RTB 2121921)
- 1985: Izvorni Folklor i Jazz - Lala Kovačev (RTB 2122189)

=== As sideman ===
- 1958: Jazz - Diksilend Ansambl Dinamo (RTB LP 506)
- 1959 Ansamble Metronom (Qualiton, Budapest LPX 7157)
- 1962: Bled '62 (RTB LV 4901)
- 1964: Pozdrav Countu Basieu - Jazz Orkestar RTB (RTB 4200)
- 1967: Spectacular South African Tour - Encores - Horst Jankowski Quartet (Mercury Records SR 9003)
- 1967: Jankowkinetik - Horst Jankowski Quartet (BASF / MPS)
- 1967: Piano On The Rocks - Horst Jankowski (Mercury Records 138 110 MCY)
- 1969: Live - Catarina Valente / musical director Horst Jankowski (Decca SLK 16625 - P)
- 1970: Jankowskyline - Horst Jankowski (BASF / MPS CRA 864)
- 1971: Jankowskingsize - For Night People Only - Horst Jankowski (BASF / MPS CRA 822)
- 1972: Rockin' Bach Dimensions - Bobby Gutesha (BASF / MPS)
- 1972: Follow Me - Horst Jankowski (Intercord 28 503 - 1 U)
- 1972: ...Und.../ Tribute To Martin Luther King (ECM C 063 - 29070)
- 1972: God Means Joy - Roland Kovac New Set (Selected Sound 9022)
- 1973: Flight To Frisco - Bobby Gutesha Orchestra (Selected Sound 9039)
- 1973: Et Cetera Live - Wolfgang Dauner (BASF / MPS)
- 1973: Squeezing Art & Tender Flutes - Art Van Damme (BASF / MPS 21 217558)
- 1973: Jankowskeytones - Horst Jankowski (MPS 14 269)
- 1973: Ack Van Rooyen Meets Jerry Van Rooyen - Didn't We (RCA LSP 10299)
- 1974: Tanz Party Mit Max Greger (Polydor 3 271 495)
- 1975: 15. International Jazz Festival Ljubljana '74 (Jugoton LSY 65007/8)
- 1975: Inactin' - Michal Urbaniak Group (Intercord)
- 1975: Parathyphus B - Michal Urbaniak Group (Intercord)
- 1976: Islands - Benny Bailey (Enja Records 2082)
- 1976: NDR Workshop 1976 (NDR)
- 1977: In Pain I Was Born - Boško Petrović (Jugoton LSY 68035)
- 1977: Catch Up 2 : The Birth Of The Second Life - Milan Pilar (Calig)
- 1978: Wide And Blue - Chris Hinze (EMI - Electrola LC 5527)
- 1978: Jazz Orkestar Radio-Televizije Beograd (1948-1978) - Jazz Orkestar RTB sa gostima (RTB 21211719)
- 1979: Jazz Na Koncertnom Podiju Vol.4 (Jugoton LSY 61536)
- 1979: Trumpet & Rhythm Unit - Gojković-Kovačev (RTB 4206)
- 1982: Some Kind Of Changes - Charlie Mariano (Callig)
- 1982: The Horn Is Back - Gunter Klatt (JG Records)
- 1991: Meeting On Hvar - Chuck Israels International Trio (Anima)
- 1998: V.A. Bravissimo II - 50 Years NDR Big Band (ACT)
- 2001: V.A. Nek' Jazz Poteče - 17th Yu Jazz Fest, Valjevo 2001 (Jazz Festival Valjevo)
