= Cantando =

Studio album by Bobo Stenson Trio
- Released: 2008
- Recorded: December 2007
- Studio: RTSI; Lugano, Switzerland
- Genre: Jazz
- Length: 78:05
- Label: ECM; ECM 2023
- Producer: Manfred Eicher

Bobo Stenson chronology
Goodbye (2002)	Cantando (2008)	Indicum (2012)

Cantando is an album by the Bobo Stenson Trio, recorded in December 2007 and released on ECM the following year. The trio features rhythm section Anders Jormin and Jon Fält.

== Reception ==
The AllMusic review by Thom Jurek states, "This is a stellar effort that announces—hopefully—an extended run for this trio."

Professional ratings
Review scores
Source	Rating
AllMusic	4/5 stars

== Track listing ==
No.	Title	Writer(s)	Length
1.	"Olivia"	Silvio Rodríguez	6:38
2.	"Song of Ruth"	Petr Eben	6:42
3.	"Wooden Church"	Jormin	7:01
4.	"M"	Jormin	7:59
5.	"Chiquilín de Bachín"	Horacio Ferrer; Astor Piazzolla	8:04
6.	"Pages"	Fält; Jormin; Stenson	13:40
7.	"Don's Kora Song"	Don Cherry	5:08
8.	"A Fixed Goal"	Ornette Coleman	4:12
9.	"Love, I've Found You"	Connie Moore; Danny Small	3:12
10.	"Liebesode"	Alban Berg	8:36
11.	"Song of Ruth, var."	Eben	6:47

== Personnel ==
=== Bobo Stenson Trio ===
- Bobo Stenson – piano
- Anders Jormin – bass
- Jon Fält – drums
