= Jon Fält =

Swedish jazz drummer

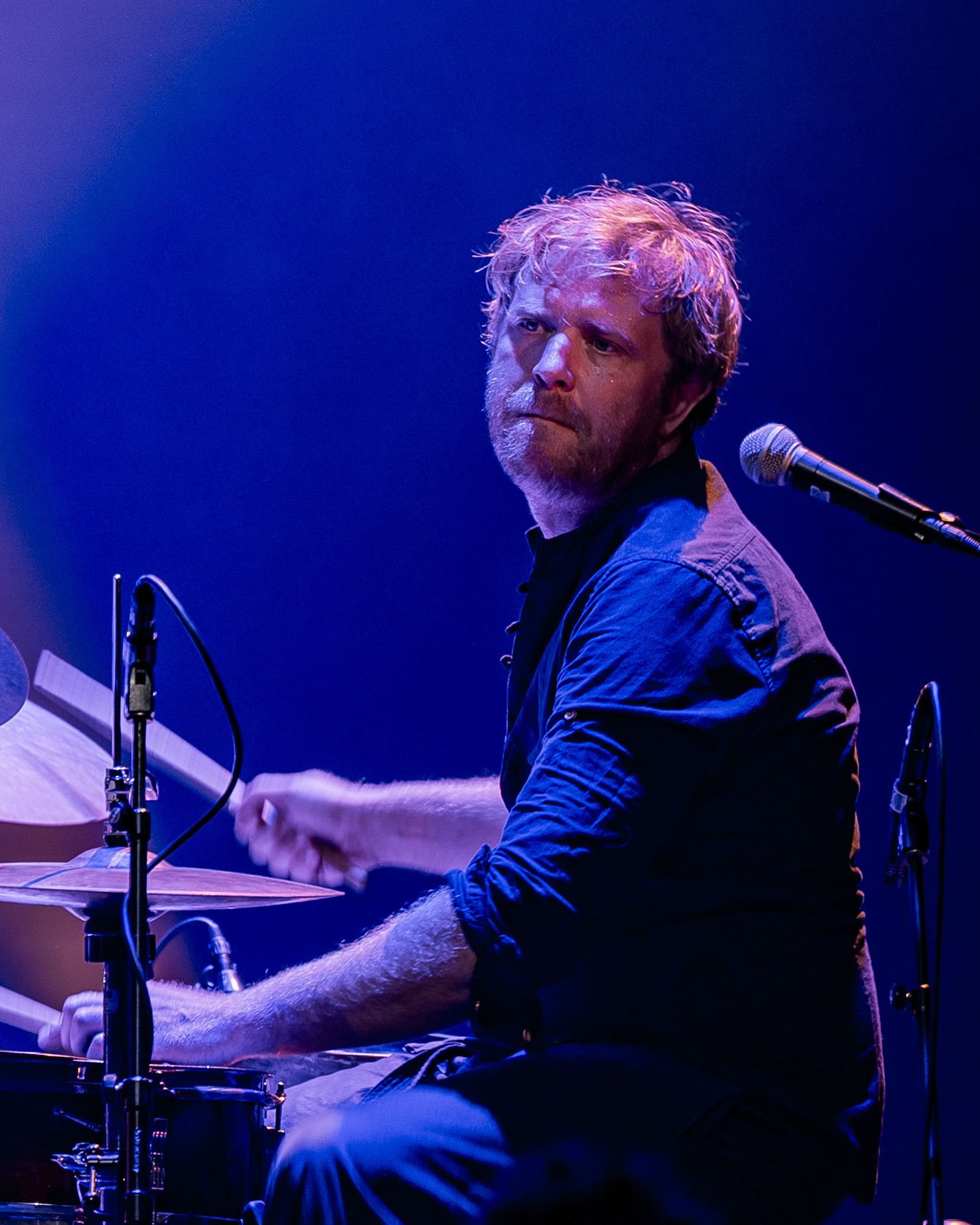
Jon Fält (2025)

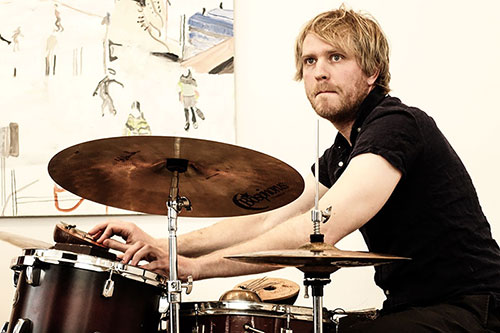
Jon Fält (2016)

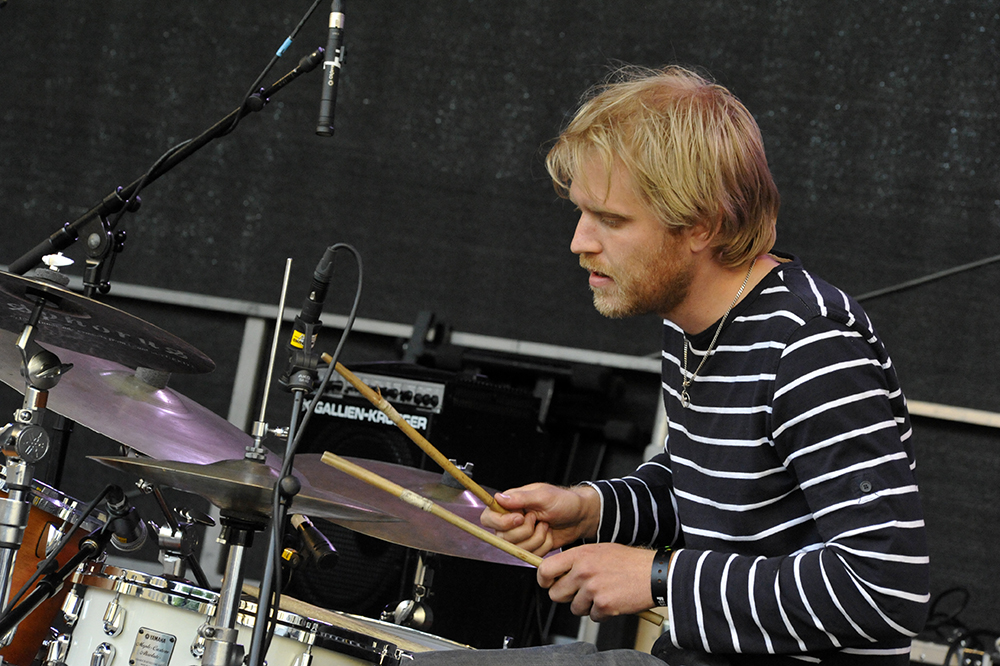
Jon Fält on stage with Bobo Stenson at the Stockholm Jazz Festival 2010.

Jon Fält (born 28 August 1979 in Gävle, Sweden) is a Swedish drummer in modern jazz.

== Biography ==
Fält was raised in Sandviken and had first music lessons with Stefan Bergkvist at the Kulturskolan. From 1990 he played in the Sandvik Small Band at the school with which he first recorded in 1994. He attended the Jazzgymnasium in Gävle and the Kungliga Musikhögskolan in Stockholm. In the following years he worked with Alberto Pinton, Bobo Stenson (to be heard on his ECM albums Cantando, 2007 and Indicum, 2011), with Lina Nyberg (Tellus, 2006) and Jon Vanderlander, in the ensemble The Stoner led by the saxophonist Nils Berg, further in the bands The Deciders, Splint!, Yun Kan 5 (with Fredrik Ljungkvist) and in Trondheim Jazz Orchestra. In 2007, Fält received the Alice Babs Jazzstipend. He was involved in 20 jazz recording sessions between 1994 and 2012, including with Palle Danielsson, Fredrick Nordstrom and Anders Jormin. In a review on Nordic Music on the Jormin album Ad Lucem states: "Jon Fält is not a drummer in the traditional sense, he creates sounds and fills, creates space by not playing, grooving but still - factually cool, of course. “ Since 2019, he has been working with Norwegian double bassist & vocalist Ellen Andrea Wang and guitarist Rob Luft in a trio formation. They have released one record together as a group, entitled Closeness. This was described by London Jazz News as a spine-chillingly beautiful album.

== Discography ==
- Nils Olmedal/Jon Falt/Mats Äleklint/Joakim Milder: Silent Room (2002)
- Dog Out: Dog Out (Moserobie 2003), with Fredrik Nordstrom, Alberto Pinton, Mattias Welin
- Fredrik Ljungkvist: Yun Kan 12345 (Caprice, 2003), with Fredrik Ljungkvist, Klas Nevrin, Mattias Welin, Per Åke Holmlander
- Alberto Pinton: The Visible (Moserobie, 2004), with Mats Äleklint, Alberto Pinton, Mattias Ståhl, Torbjörn Zetterberg
- Fredrik Ljungkvist & Yun Kan 5: Badaling (Moserobie, 2005), with Klas Nevrin, Per Åke Holmlander, Mattias Welin
- Fredrik Nordstrom: Blue (Moserobie, 2007), with Bobo Stenson, Mattias Welin
- Palle Danielsson/Jon Fält/Mathias Landæus: Opening (2009)
- Anders Jormin: Ad Lucem (ECM, 2011), with Fredrik Ljungkvist, Mariam Wallentin, Erika Angell
- Maciej Garbowski: Elements (IMP, 2012), with Maciej Garbowski, Piotr Damasiewicz
- Fredrik Ljungkvist Yun Kan 10: Ten (Hoop, 2012), with Mats Aleklint, Per-Ake Holmlander, Fredrik Ljungkvist, Klas Nevrin, Mattias Risberg, Katt Hernandez, Mattias Welin, Raymond Strid, Sofia Jernberg
- Susana Santos Silva, Lotte Anker, Sten Sandell, Torbjörn Zetterberg and Jon Fält: Life and Other Transient Storms (Clean Feed Records, 2016)
- Bobo Stenson Trio: Indicum (ECM, 2011), Contra la Indecisión (ECM, 2018)
