= Janusz Muniak =

Polish jazz saxophonist (1941–2016)

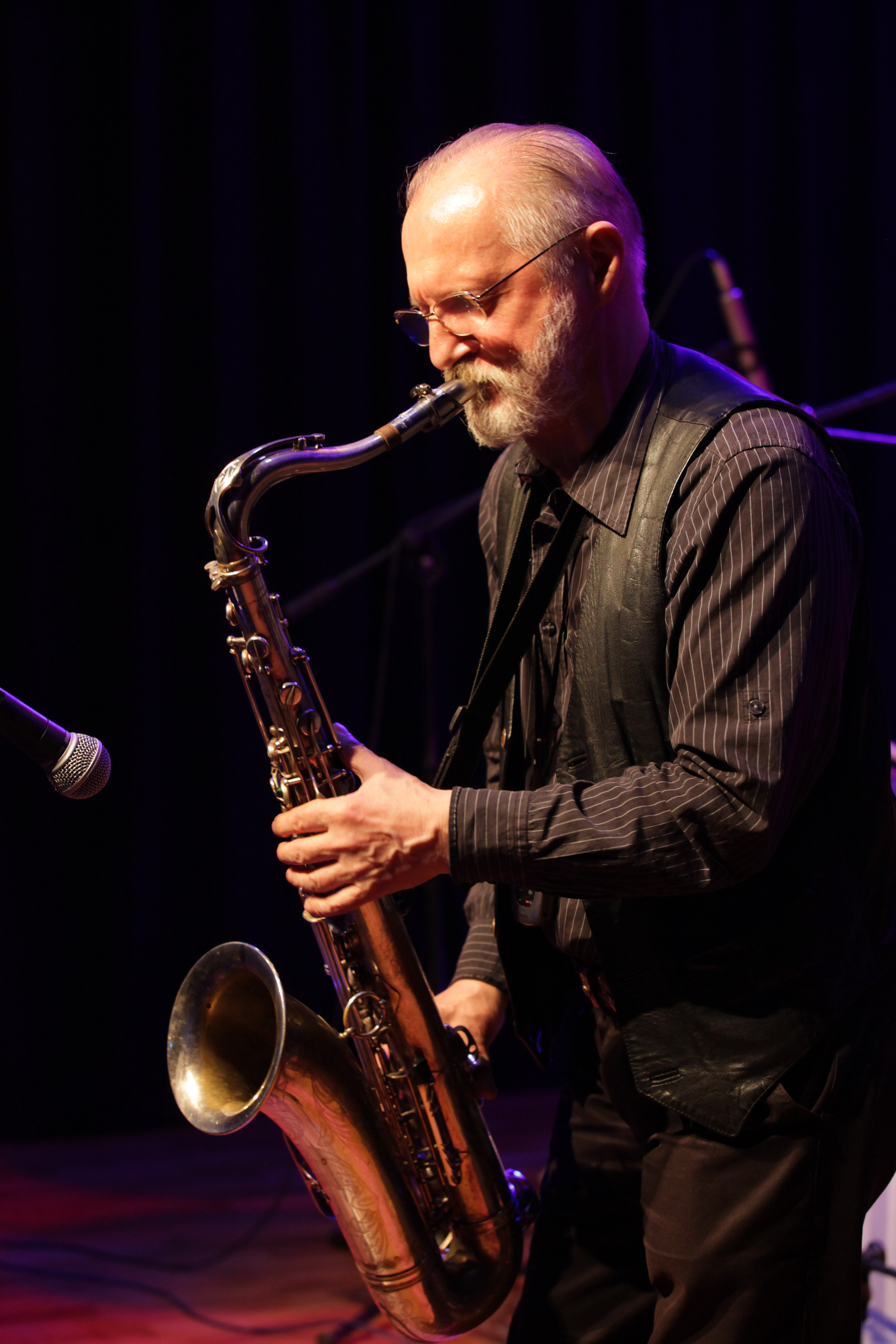
Janusz Muniak

Janusz Józef Muniak (3 June 1941 – 31 January 2016) was a Polish jazz musician, saxophonist, flutist, arranger, and composer. He was one of the pioneers of free jazz in Europe, although later in life tended towards the mainstream style.

He debuted in Lublin in 1960. From the 60s to the 90s, he worked with, among others, Ronnie Burrage, George Cables, James Cammack, Don Cherry, Ted Curson, Art Farmer, Eddie Gladden, Dexter Gordon, Eddie Henderson, Freddie Hubbard, Hank Jones, Rusty Jones, Nigel Kennedy, Branislav Lala Kovačev, Joe Lovano, Wynton Marsalis, Lyle Mays, Pat Metheny, Hank Mobley, Takeo Moriyama, Joe Newman, Sal Nistico, Jasper van 't Hof, Aladár Pege, Rufus Reid, Akira Sakata, Archie Shepp, Charlie Ventura, Yōsuke Yamashita and Polish musicians such as Vladyslav Sendecki, Tomasz Stańko, Zbigniew Namysłowski, Zbigniew Seifert, Adam Makowicz, Wojciech Karolak, Krzysztof Komeda, Andrzej Kurylewicz, Andrzej Trzaskowski, Jan Ptaszyn Wróblewski, Jarek Śmietana, Jan Jarczyk, Włodek Pawlik, Leszek Możdżer and Michał Urbaniak. He was one of the first jazz musiciansd who performed who cooperated with rock musicians like Dżamble and Czesław Niemen.

After 1976, he was the leader of several ensembles, and since 1991 he has been running the Jazz Club "U Muniaka" at Florianska 3 in Krakow, which, under his artistic management, became an important incubator of new talents.

In the poll of Jazz Top 2011 of the monthly Jazz Forum, Janusz Muniak was voted the best saxophonist in Poland.

He is buried at Rakowicki Cemetery in Krakow.

== Orders and decorations ==
- 1962 Złoty Helikon awarded by Krakow Jazz Club
- 2015: Złoty Fryderyk for outstanding artistic achievement awarded by Phonographic Academy
- 2016: Knight's Cross of the Order of Polonia Restituta awarded posthumously for outstanding achievements in promoting jazz music in Poland.

== Discography ==
=== As leader ===
- 1965: Andrzej Trzaskowski Quintet (CD reissue: Polish Jazz vol. 4, Polskie Nagrania Muza)
- 1966/2004: Seant (CD reissue: Polish Jazz vol. 11, Polskie Nagrania Muza)
- 1978: Question Mark (Polskie Nagrania Muza)
- 1983: Placebo (PolJazz)
- 1986: Crazy Girl (PolJazz)
- 1994: You Know These Songs? (GOWI Records)
- 1995: Not So Fast (GOWI Records)
- 1997: One And Four (GOWI Records)
- 1998: Spotkanie (Cracovia Music) – with Wojciech Karolak and Kazimierz Jonkisz
- 2000: Just Friends (Not Two Records)
- 2002: Annie (Not Two Records)
- 2015: Contemplation (Inspiration) – with Joachim Mencel, Willem Von Hombrecht, Harry Tanschek

=== Sideman ===
- 1964: Various artists Jazz Jamboree 1964, vol. 2 (two tracks only with the Andrzej Trzaskowski Quintet; Polskie Nagrania Muza)
- 1969: Jazz Studio Orchestra of Polish Radio (Polish Jazz vol. 19, Polskie Nagrania Muza)
- 1970: Krzysztof Sadowski Krzysztof Sadowski and His Hammond Organ (Polish Jazz vol. 21, Polskie Nagrania Muza)
- 1970/1999/2004: Tomasz Stańko Music for K (Polish Jazz vol. 22, Polskie Nagrania Muza)
- 1971: Piotr Figiel Piotr (Pronit)
- 1971/1987/1993: Dżamble Wołanie o słońce nad światem (Polskie Nagrania Muza)
- 1972: Tomasz Stańko Jazzmessage from Poland (JG Records)
- 1973: All Stars After Hours Night Jam Session In Warsaw 1973 (Polish Jazz vol 37, Polskie Nagrania Muza)
- 1973: Polish Radio Jazz Band Koncert podwójny na pięciu solistów i orkiestrę (PolJazz)
- 1973: Tomasz Stańko Purple Sun (Calig)
- 1973: Tomasz Stańko W Pałacu Prymasowskim (released 1983, Pronit)
- 1975: Stowarzyszenie Popierania Prawdziwej Twórczości Chałturnik, Andrzej Rosiewicz SPPT Chałturnik, Andrzej Rosiewicz (co-led album, PolJazz)
- 1976: SPPT Chałturnik Kto tak pięknie gra (Polskie Nagrania Muza)
- 1982: Grand Standard Orchestra Grand Standard Orchestra (conducted by Jan "Ptaszyn" Wróblewski; PolJazz)
- 1995: Andrzej Dąbrowski A Time For Love (Polonia)
- 1998: Krzysztof Komeda Vol. 4 - Moja Ballada (three tracks only, recorded 1966–1967, PolJazz; previously reissued as Muzyka Krzysztofa Komedy 4 in 1989)
- 2003: Piotr Lemańczyk Follow the Soul (Two tracks only; Allegro)

=== Compilations and collections ===
- 1967/2000: Novi Singers Torpedo / Rien Ne Va Plus (JVR)
- 1999: Novi Singers Vocal Jazz From Poland 1965-75 (Jazzanova Compost Records (JCR))
- 1999: Various artists Polish Jazz: Modern Jazz From Poland 1963-75 (Jazzanova Compost Records (JCR))
- 2002: Various artists Antologia jazzu (6CD box-set, two tracks only; Polskie Radio)
- 2015: Various artists The Best of Cracow Jazz – Traditional (Kurant)
