= Alexi Tuomarila =

Finnish jazz pianist and composer (born 1974)

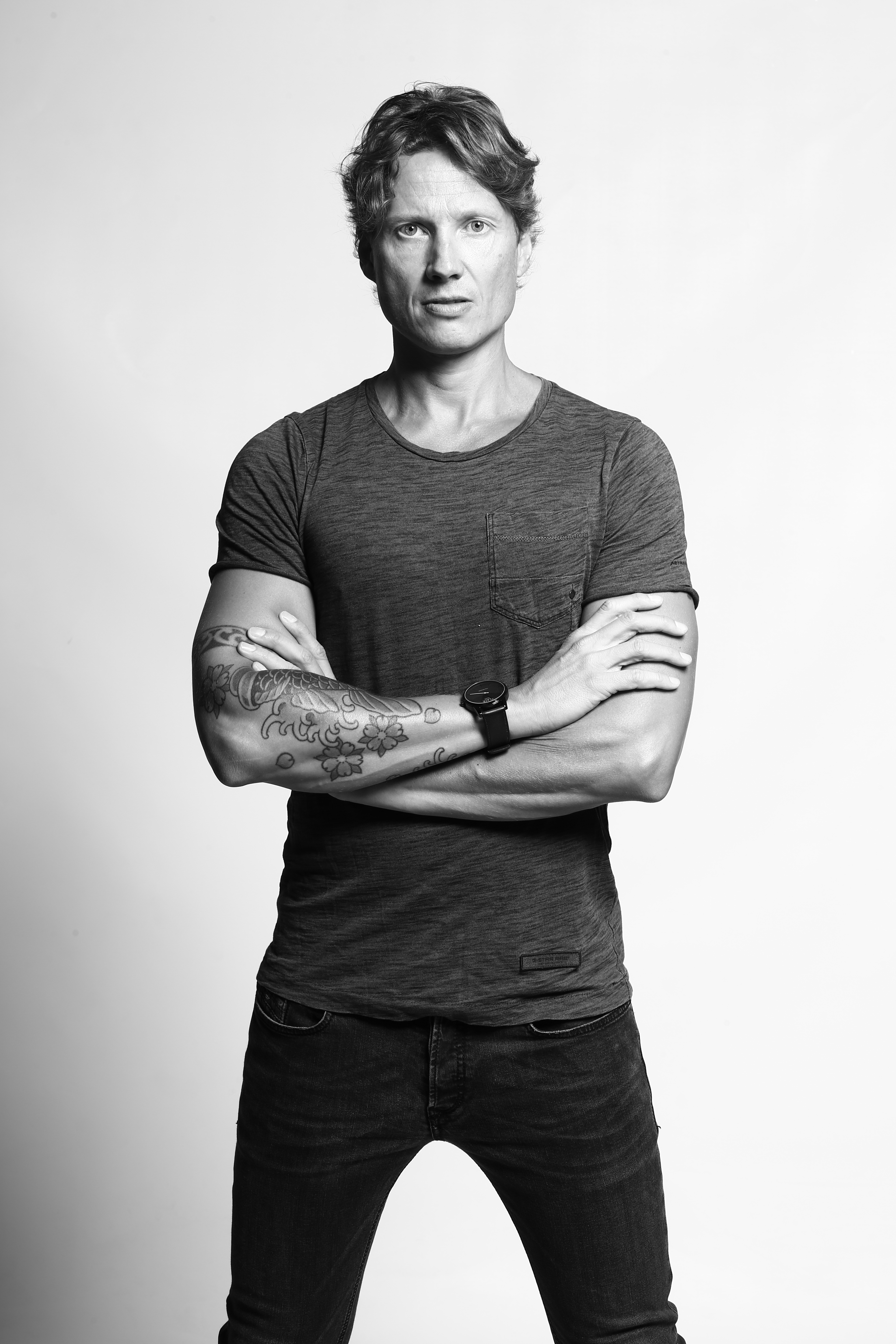
- Alexi Tuomarila, Finnish jazz pianist and composer

Background information
- Born: 27 February 1974 (age 51); Pori, Finland
- Origin: Finland
- Genres: Jazz
- Occupations: Musician, composer
- Instrument: Piano
- Labels: Edition Records, Svart Records, Igloo Records, Warner Music, Jazzaway Records
- Website: www.alexituomarila.com

Alexi Tuomarila (born 27 February 1974) is a Finnish jazz pianist and composer.

== Biography ==
Born in Pori, Finland, Alexi Tuomarila started studying classical piano at the age of six at the Espoo Music Academy, Finland. As a teenager he was enthusiastic about rock and grunge music before digging deeper into jazz through his father's record collection. In 1993 Tuomarila was accepted to Oulunkylä pop/jazz Conservatory in Helsinki, Finland. Next year, in 1994 he continued his studies under Diederik Wissels and Nathalie Loriers at the Royal Conservatory of Brussels and earned his Master of Music degree in 1999. Currently Tuomarila is working on his doctoral research at the University of Arts, Sibelius Academy, Helsinki.

During his studies he formed his Quartet with Nicolas Kummert, Christophe Devisscher, and Teun Verbruggen. In 1999 his quartet won the award for best band and Tuomarila won the prize for best soloist at the "21st Hoeilaart International Jazz Competition" Belgium. In 2001, he received the first prize at the "3rd International Jazz Soloist Competition" in Monaco, and he won the "10th International Tremplin Jazz Competition" in Avignon with his quartet.

The Alexi Tuomarila Quartet also won the first prize at the "5th International Granada Jazz Competition" in Spain 2005.

The quartet recorded and released three albums Voices of Pohjola for Igloo Records (Benelux) 2001, the Emma Award (Finnish Grammy) nominee 02 for Finlandia Records - Warner Music Group 2003, and Runo X for Edita Cambeya (Spain) 2007.

Alexi Tuomarila Quartet changed the name of the group into Drifter and welcomed Axel Gilain as a bass player/vocalist. Drifter recorded and released the critically acclaimed Flow album for Edition Records, UK in 2015.

In 2005 Tuomarila formed his renowned trio, with Norwegian bassist Mats Eilertsen and Finnish drummer Olavi Louhivuori. The trio has released four critically acclaimed albums: Constellation for Jazzaway Records (Norway, 2006), Seven Hills (2013), Kingdom (2017) and Sphere (2019) for distinguished British Edition Records.

The latest album Sphere earned Tuomarila the prestigious Emma award (Finnish Grammy) for "Jazz album of the year".

British BBC Music Magazine gave the album five stars and selected it as the "Jazz album of the month" (07/2019).

Tuomarila played a decade, from 2007 until 2017, with the Polish trumpet player Tomasz Stańko in different band combinations. Their first concert together was at the 750th anniversary of the city of Kraków.

During 2009–2014 Tuomarila played with Tomasz Stanko Quintet (Jakob Bro, Anders Christensen, Olavi Louhivuori) toured around the world and also recorded the Dark Eyes for ECM Records, 2010, which reached number five in the Polish pop charts.

Between 2015 and 2017 Tuomarila performed and toured with the Tomasz Stanko NY Quartet in Europe, China and Australia with Gerald Cleaver and Reuben Rogers

In 2023, the Tapiola Sinfonietta and the Alexi Tuomarila Trio, featuring Sami Rahola on electronics, premiered Tuomarila's concerto "Between Dark and Light" for symphony orchestra at the April Jazz Festival in Tapiolasali, Espoo Cultural Centre. The concerto was conducted by Jukka Iisakkila.

Tuomarila has also shared the stage with i.a. Eric Revis, Thomas Morgan (bassist), Reggie Washington, Joey Baron, Kenny Wheeler, Anders Jormin, Kush Abadey, Jim Black, Nelson Veras, Perico Sambeat, UMO Jazz Orchestra, Eero Koivistoinen, Peter Erskine, Bill Evans (saxophonist) Anders Bergcrantz, Rick Margitza, Maciej Obara.

== Awards ==
- Emma award category Jazz Album of the year, Alexi Tuomarila Trio Sphere Edition Records, UK
- Emma award Nomination, Alexi Tuomarila Quartet 02 Finlandia Records - Warner Music Group
- 1st Prize at "3rd International Monaco Jazz soloist Competition"
- 1st Prize at "10th Tremplin International Jazz Competition" Avignon, France, with Alexi Tuomarila Quartet
- 1st Prize at the "5th International Granada Jazz Competition", Spain, with Alexi Tuomarila Quartet
- 1st Prize at the "21st Hoeilaart International Jazz Competition" Brussels, Belgium

== Discography ==
=== Solo albums ===
Alexi Tuomarila

- 2024: Departing the Wasteland (Edition Records)

Alexi Tuomarila Trio (Mats Eilertsen, Olavi Louhivuori)

- 2006: Constellation (Jazzaway Records)
- 2013: Seven Hills (Edition Records)
- 2017: Kingdom (Edition Records)
- 2019: Sphere (Edition Records)

Alexi Tuomarila Quartet (Nicolas Kummert, Teun Verbruggen, Christophe Devisscher, Antti Lötjönen)

- 2001: Voices of Pohjola (Igloo Records)
- 2003: 02 (Warner Jazz - Finlandia Records)
- 2007: Runo X (Edita Cambeya)

Drifter (Axel Gilain, Nicolas Kummert, Teun Verberuggen)

- 2015: Flow (Edition Records)

Alvarado/Koivistoinen/Tuomarila (Eero Koivistoinen, Martin Alvarado)

- 2019: Alma (Svart Records)

D.O.P.A. (Timo Kämäräinen, Tuomas Timonen)

- 2024: Vivid Dreams (Soit Se Silti)

=== Collaborations ===
Tomasz Stańko Quintet (Anders Christensen, Jakob Bro, Olavi Louhivuori)

- 2010: Dark Eyes (ECM Records - ECM 2115)

Lithium (André Fernandes, Joonas Tuuri, Jonne Taavitsainen)

- 2018: Red (Challenge Records)
- 2021: To the Stars (Eclipse Records)

Eero Koivistoinen Quartet (Jussi Lehtonen, Jori Huhtala)

- 2014: Hati Hati (Svart Records)
- 2016: Illusions (Svart Records)
- 2022: Diversity (Svart Records)

Manuel Dunkel Quartet (Teppo Mäkynen, Ville Huolman, Jaska Lukkarinen, Eero Seppä)

- 2010: A Step Forward (Texicalli Records)
- 2019: Discoveries (Eclipse Music)
- 2021: Northern Journey (Eclipse Music)

Lionel Beuvens MOTU (Kalevi Louhivuori, Brice Soniano, Franck Vaganee Natashia Kelly, Guilhem Verger, Ewout Pierreux)

- 2013: Trinite (Igloo Records)
- 2017: Earthsong (Igloo Records)
- 2022: 49 Steps to Heaven (Hypnote Records)

André Fernandes Dream Keeper (Perico Sambeat, Demian Cabaud, Iago Fernandes)

- 2016: Dream Keeper (Edition Records)

Mats Eilertsen SkyDive Quintet (Tore Brunborg, Thomas T. Dahl, Olavi Louhivuori)

- 2014: SkyDive (Hubro Music)

Nicolas Kummert Voices (Herve Samb, Jens Maurits Bouttery, Nicolas Thys)

- 2014: Liberte (Prova Records)

Andre Sumelius Quartet (Ernesto Aurignac, Marko Lohikari)

- 2010: Victory Songs (Abovoice)

Tolonen (Timo Kämäräinen, Teemu Viinikainen, Risto Toppola, Joonatan Rautio, Manuel Dunkel, Juho Kivivuori, Sampo Tiittanen, Ville Pynssi)

- 2013: Tolonen (Gateway Films/Vision Video)
