= Matka Joanna =

Studio album by the Tomasz Stańko Quartet
- Released: 1995
- Recorded: May 1994
- Studio: Rainbow Studio; Oslo, Norway
- Genre: Jazz
- Length: 68:04
- Label: ECM; ECM 1544
- Producer: Manfred Eicher

Tomasz Stańko chronology
Bossonossa and Other Ballads (1993)	Matka Joanna (1995)	Litania: Music of Krzysztof Komeda (1997)

Matka Joanna is an album by the Tomasz Stańko Quartet recorded in May 1994 and released on ECM the following year. The quartet features rhythm section Bobo Stenson, Anders Jormin and Tony Oxley.

The music was inspired by Jerzy Kawalerowicz's 1961 movie Matka Joanna od Aniołów.

== Reception ==
The AllMusic review awarded the album 4 stars.

Professional ratings
Review scores
Source	Rating
AllMusic	4/5 stars
The Penguin Guide to Jazz Recordings	3/4 stars

== Track listing ==
All compositions by Tomasz Stańko except as indicated.

1. "Monastery in the Dark" (Anders Jormin, Tony Oxley, Tomasz Stańko, Bobo Stenson) – 5:53
2. "Green Sky" – 9:37
3. "Maldoror's War Song" – 8:15
4. "Tales for a Girl, 12" – 9:09
5. "Matka Joanna from the Angels" (Jormin, Oxley, Stańko, Stenson) – 10:47
6. "Cain's Brand" – 8:38
7. "Nun's Mood" (Jormin, Oxley, Stańko, Stenson) – 3:03
8. "Celina" – 6:45
9. "Two Preludes for Tales" (Stańko, Stenson) – 1:35
10. "Klostergeist" (Oxley) – 4:22

== Personnel ==
=== Tomasz Stańko Quartet ===
- Tomasz Stańko – trumpet
- Bobo Stenson – piano
- Anders Jormin – bass
- Tony Oxley – drums
