= Goodbye (Bobo Stenson album) =

Album by Bobo Stenson

Studio album by Bobo Stenson
- Released: September 12, 2005
- Recorded: April 2004
- Studio: Avatar (New York, New York)
- Genre: Jazz
- Length: 70:07
- Label: ECM; ECM 1904
- Producer: Manfred Eicher

Bobo Stenson chronology
Serenity (1999)	Goodbye (2005)	Cantando (2007)

Goodbye is an album by jazz pianist Bobo Stenson recorded for ECM in April 2004 and released on September 12, 2005. Stenson's trio features rhythm section Anders Jormin and Paul Motian.

== Reception ==
The AllMusic review by Thom Jurek states, "Goodbye is one of, if not the most expansive and diverse collections pianist Bobo Stenson has ever released ... Goodbye is more a recording of songs than jazz pieces—at least in a traditional sense. This trio doesn't swing, they play, they slowly dance through the lyric pieces found here."

Professional ratings
Review scores
Source	Rating
AllMusic	3.5/5 stars
The Penguin Guide to Jazz Recordings	4/4 stars

== Track listing ==
All compositions by Anders Jormin except as indicated.

1. "Send in the Clowns" (Stephen Sondheim) – 4:16
2. "Rowan" – 6:05
3. "Alfonsina" (Ariel Ramírez) – 5:11
4. "There Comes a Time" (Tony Williams) – 6:42
5. "Song About Earth" (Vladimir Vysotsky) – 7:16
6. "Seli" – 8:49
7. "Goodbye" (Gordon Jenkins) – 6:39
8. "Music for a While" (Henry Purcell) – 5:20
9. "Allegretto Rubato" – 5:27
10. "Jack of Clubs" (Paul Motian) – 2:57
11. "Sudan" (Motian) – 2:36
12. "Queer Street" (Stenson) – 2:09
13. "Triple Play" – 2:01
14. "Race Face" (Ornette Coleman) – 4:39

== Personnel ==
=== Musicians ===
- Bobo Stenson – piano
- Anders Jormin – bass
- Paul Motian – drums

=== Technical personnel ===
- Manfred Eicher – producer
- James A. Farber – recording engineer
  - Aya Takemura – assistant engineer
- Sascha Kleis – design
- Robert Lewis – liner photography
- Ioannis Voulgarakis – cover photography
