= Ad Lucem =

Studio album by Anders Jormin
- Released: March 16, 2012
- Recorded: January 2011
- Studios: Studio Epidemin; Göteborg, Sweden
- Genre: Jazz
- Length: 52:07
- Labels: ECM; ECM 2232
- Producers: Anders Jormin; Johannes Lundberg

Anders Jormin chronology
Songs in Meantone (2011)	Ad Lucem (2012)	Provenance (2012)

Ad Lucem is an album by Swedish bassist and composer Anders Jormin recorded in January 2011 and released on ECM the following year.

== Reception ==
The JazzTimes review by LLoyd Sachs observed "With its utterly distinctive chamber sound, Anders Jormin’s Ad Lucem is a certain winner this year in the Latin jazz category—no, not the Latin jazz played by Eddie Palmieri, but the considerably rarer kind featuring lyrics in the language of Caesar."

All About Jazz stated "any new recording from Jormin proves well worth the wait and Ad Lucem is no exception."

== Track listing ==
All tracks are written by Anders Jormin except as indicated.

No.	Title	Writer(s)	Length
1.	"hic et nunc"		6:55
2.	"quibus"		6:05
3.	"clamor"		5:39
4.	"vigor"	Anders Jormin; Erika Angell; Fredrik Ljungkvist; Jon Fält; Mariam Wallentin	2:50
5.	"inter semper et numquam"		3:58
6.	"lignum"	Jon Fält	0:34
7.	"matutinum"		4:20
8.	"vox animæ"		5:04
9.	"vesper est"		4:08
10.	"lux"		6:22
11.	"cæruleus"		5:10
12.	"matutinum – clausula"		1:02
Total length:			52:07

== Personnel ==
- Anders Jormin – bass
- Fredrik Ljungkvist – clarinet, bass clarinet, tenor saxophone
- Jon Fält – drums
- Erika Angell, Mariam Wallentin – voice
