= Soul of Things =

Studio album by the Tomasz Stańko Quartet
- Released: March 11, 2002
- Recorded: August 2001
- Studio: Rainbow Studio; Oslo, Norway
- Genre: Jazz
- Length: 74:51
- Label: ECM; ECM 1788
- Producer: Manfred Eicher

Tomasz Stańko chronology
From the Green Hill (1998)	Soul of Things (2002)	Suspended Night (2002)

Soul of Things is an album by the Tomasz Stańko Quartet recorded in August 2001 and released on ECM March the following year. The quartet features rhythm section Marcin Wasilewski, Slawomir Kurkiewicz and Michal Miskiewicz.

== Reception ==
The album ranked number 97 in Jazzwise's "The 100 Jazz Albums That Shook the World" list on December 7, 2021.

Professional ratings
Review scores
Source	Rating
AllMusic	4/5 stars
The Penguin Guide to Jazz Recordings	3.5/4 stars

== Track listing ==
All compositions by Tomasz Stańko.

1. "Soul of Things I" – 5:41
2. "Soul of Things II" – 8:00
3. "Soul of Things III" – 4:23
4. "Soul of Things IV" – 5:12
5. "Soul of Things V" – 5:44
6. "Soul of Things VI" – 5:02
7. "Soul of Things VII" – 5:48
8. "Soul of Things VIII" – 3:23
9. "Soul of Things IX" – 8:08
10. "Soul of Things X" – 6:15
11. "Soul of Things XI" – 6:56
12. "Soul of Things XII" – 5:08
13. "Soul of Things XIII" – 5:11

== Personnel ==
=== Tomasz Stańko Quartet ===
- Tomasz Stańko – trumpet
- Marcin Wasilewski – piano
- Slawomir Kurkiewicz – bass
- Michal Miskiewicz – drums
