= Serenity (Bobo Stenson album) =

Studio album by the Bobo Stenson Trio
- Released: 2000
- Recorded: April 1999
- Studio: Rainbow Studio; Oslo, Norway
- Genre: Jazz
- Length: 90:33
- Label: ECM; ECM 1740/41
- Producer: Manfred Eicher

Bobo Stenson chronology
War Orphans (1997)	Serenity (2000)	Goodbye (2002)

Serenity is a double album by the Bobo Stenson Trio recorded in April 1999 and released on ECM the following year. The trio features rhythm section Anders Jormin and Jon Christensen.

== Reception ==
The contemporary JazzTimes review by Stuart Nicholson stated "Here, Stenson emerges as an original voice within jazz, which in these renascent times is cause enough for celebration."

The Penguin Guide to Jazz selected this album as part of its suggested “Core Collection,” describing it as “a towering achievement.”

The AllMusic review by Thom Jurek awarded the album 4½ stars stating "Simply put, there are no records like the Stenson Trio's Serenity. The band has outdone themselves by their slow, careful development over three records and has become one of the premier rhythm trios on the planet. Serenity is not only the group's coup de grace, but also a jazz masterpiece of the highest order."

Professional ratings
Review scores
Source	Rating
Penguin Guide to Jazz	4/4 stars
AllMusic	4.5/5 stars

== Track listing ==
All compositions by Bobo Stenson except as indicated

Disc one

1. "T." (Anders Jormin) - 6:46
2. "West Print" - 2:24
3. "North Print" (Jormin) - 2:04
4. "East Print" (Jon Christensen) - 2:42
5. "South Print" - 2:32
6. "Polska of Despair (II)" (Lorens Brolin) - 4:41
7. "Golden Rain" - 5:16
8. "Swee Pea" (Wayne Shorter) - 6:55
9. "Simple & Sweet" (Jormin) - 8:17
10. "Der Pflaumenbaum" (Hanns Eisler) - 4:31

Disc two

1. "El mayor" (Silvio Rodríguez) - 5:29
2. "Fader V (Father World)" - 7:23
3. "More Cymbals" (Christensen, Jormin, Stenson) - 4:18
4. "Extra Low" (Christensen, Jormin, Stenson) - 0:41
5. "Die Nachtigall" (Alban Berg) - 4:51
6. "Rimbaud Gedicht" (Eisler) - 3:15
7. "Polska of Despair (I)" (Brolin) - 6:55
8. "Serenity" (Charles Ives) - 5:20
9. "Tonus" - 6:13

== Personnel ==
=== Bobo Stenson Trio ===
- Bobo Stenson – piano
- Anders Jormin – double bass
- Jon Christensen – drums
