= Tomasz Stańko =

Polish trumpeter and composer (1942–2018)

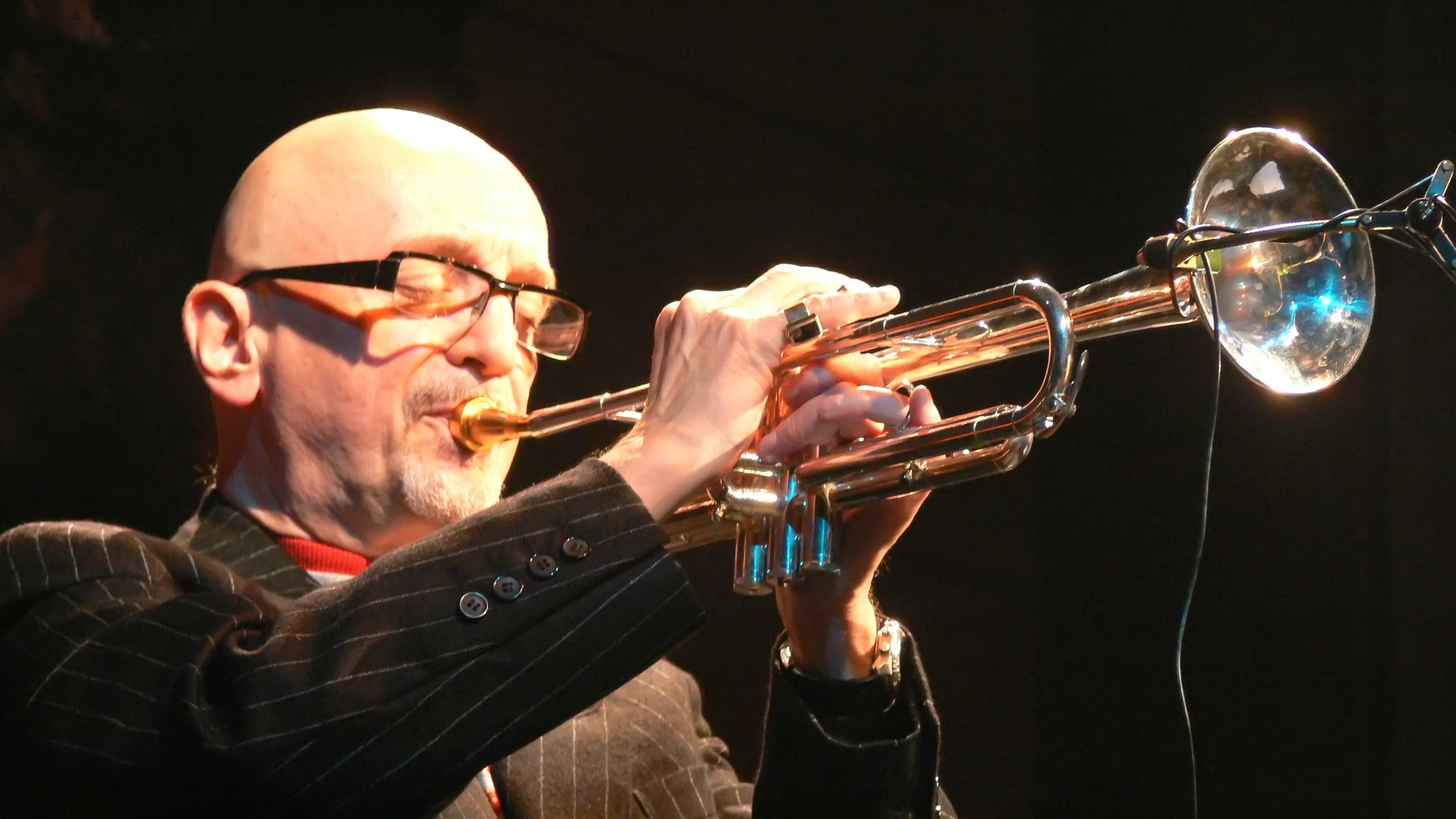
- Stańko in 2007

Background information
- Born: Tomasz Ludwik Stańko; 11 July 1942; Rzeszów, Poland
- Died: 29 July 2018 (aged 76) Warsaw, Poland
- Genres: Jazz
- Occupation: Musician
- Instrument: Trumpet
- Years active: 1960s–2018
- Labels: ECM, PolJazz, PN Muza
- Website: www.tomaszstanko.com

Tomasz Ludwik Stańko (Polish: [ˈtɔmaʂ ˈstaj̃kɔ]; 11 July 1942 – 29 July 2018) was a Polish trumpeter and composer associated with free jazz and the avant-garde.

In 1962, Tomasz Stańko formed his first band, the Jazz Darings, with saxophonist Janusz Muniak, pianist Adam Makowicz, bassist Jacek Ostaszewski, drummer Wiktor Perelmuter. Inspired by Ornette Coleman and the innovations of John Coltrane, Miles Davis and George Russell, the group is often cited by music historians as the first European group to play free jazz. In his later years, he collaborated with pianist Krzysztof Komeda on Komeda's album Astigmatic, recorded in late 1965. In 1968, Stańko formed a quintet whose members were Janusz Muniak (tenor and soprano saxophones, flute), Zbigniew Seifert (alto sax and violin), Bronisław Suchanek (bass), Janusz Stefański (drums, percussion). In 1975, he formed the Tomasz Stańko-Adam Makowicz Unit.

Stańko established a reputation as a leading figure not only in Polish jazz, but internationally as well, working with musicians including Jack DeJohnette, Dave Holland, Reggie Workman, Rufus Reid, Lester Bowie, David Murray, Manu Katché and Chico Freeman. From 1984, he was a member of Cecil Taylor's big band.

== Biography ==
=== Early years ===
I don't go out much. I don't drive a car. I don't have a hobby, like golf. Only music. I stopped drinking and I stopped doping. I stopped for financial reasons, to be independent, not for health. I am a strong guy.

— Tomasz Stańko (1997)

Tomasz Stańko was born in Rzeszów, Poland, on 11 July 1942. His first encounters with jazz were through Voice of America radio programs and tours initiated by the U.S. State Department. Coming of age in Communist Poland, Stańko was impressed by the correlation jazz had with a message of freedom. In 1958 he saw his first jazz concert given by Dave Brubeck. Along with the pianist Adam Makowicz and with the saxophonist Janusz Muniak, the group took inspiration from the music of musicians such as Ornette Coleman, George Russell and Miles Davis and was considered by many critics to be the first group in Europe to perform in the free jazz idiom.

In 1963 Stańko joined the Krzysztof Komeda quintet, where he learned much about harmony, musical structure and asymmetry. During his career with Komeda, which concluded in 1967, Stańko did five tours with the pianist and recorded eleven albums with him. In 1968 Stańko formed a quintet that met critical acclaim—one that included Zbigniew Seifert on violin and alto saxophone. In 1970, he joined the Globe Unity Orchestra, and in 1971 he collaborated with Krzysztof Penderecki and Don Cherry. Not long after he formed a quartet that included himself, saxophonist Tomasz Szukalski and Finnish drummer Edward Vesala. His performances with Vesala are often considered to be some of his most important work. In 1975, he formed the Tomasz Stańko-Adam Makowicz Unit.

=== 1980s and 1990s ===
During the 1980s, he traveled to India and recorded solo work in the Taj Mahal, and also worked with Chico Freeman and Howard Johnson in Vesala's solo album Heavy Life. He was featured in a profile on composer Graham Collier in the 1985 Channel 4 documentary Hoarded Dreams. In the mid-1980s, he began doing extensive work with Cecil Taylor, performing in his big bands and also led various groups of his own, including COCX (with Vitold Rek and Apostolis Anthimos). Then, before returning to ECM Records, Stańko also worked in a trio that included himself, Arild Andersen and Jon Christensen. In 1993, Stańko formed a new quartet composed of the then 16-year-old drummer Michał Miśkiewicz, along with Miśkiewicz's two friends, pianist Marcin Wasilewski and bassist Sławomir Kurkiewicz. That same year he also formed an international quartet that included Bobo Stenson, Tony Oxley and Anders Jormin. in 1994 the quartet released their first ECM recording titled Matka Joanna. In 1997, Stańko formed a group which performed the songs of pianist Krzysztof Komeda, touring London, Copenhagen, Stockholm and appearing at jazz festivals like those in Nancy and Berlin. The idea for the project came from ECM president Manfred Eicher.

Stańko lost his natural teeth in the 1990s, although over time he developed a new embouchure with the help of a skilled dentist and monotonous practice. He would spend long hours playing what he deemed to be "boring" long tones which helped to strengthen his lip, in spite of playing with the disadvantage of dentures.

=== 2000s ===
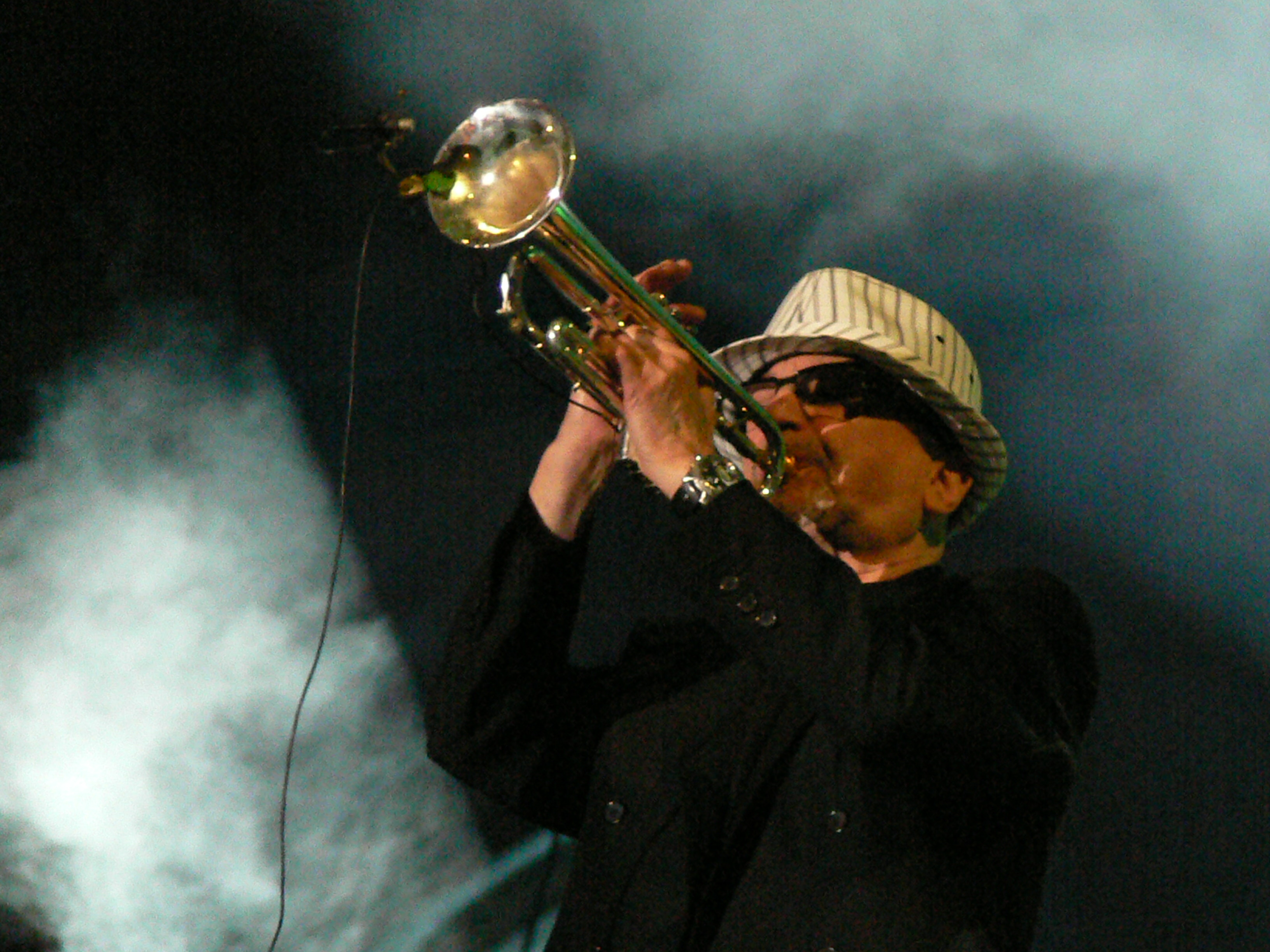
Stańko performing in Kraków 2007

The early 2000s was a time of extensive international touring. This experience led to a second album of Stańko's Polish quartet Suspended Night. Billboard magazine noted that this album was one of the bestselling jazz albums of 2004 in the United States. Together with Suspended Night ECM released a collection of Stańko's recording in its Rarum/ Selected Recordings series.

In 2005 the quartet recorded the last joint album Lontano, again for ECM. Having an established position on the world jazz stage, each album of the quartet as celebrated across Europe and the United States. In 2005 the band also made its first tour around Asia and Australia. In 2005 Stańko also created music for the Warsaw Uprising Museum titled Freedom in August.

The second half of the first decade 2000 saw a new resurgence in Stańko's career: a chapter of experiments, creating projects, searching for new sounds. As a result of these experiences, in 2007 a new band, a Scandinavian quintet composed of Alexi Tuomarila, Jakob Bro, Anders Christensen and Olavi Louhivuori, was formed, with which Stańko recorded the 2009 album Dark Eyes for ECM.

=== Later years ===
The end of the first decade of the 21st century marked the beginning of the New York period in Stańko's life. His move to Manhattan saw him give regular concerts in New York venues and clubs, such as Birdland, Jazz Standard and Merkin Hall. Stańko used the opportunity to meet with local musicians and absorbed new ideas and richness of sounds. New projects were spontaneously created, including those with Lee Konitz, Craig Taborn, Thomas Morgan, Gerald Cleaver, Chris Potter and others. The idea of the New York Quartet was forming which, after various combinations, eventually formed in 2012.

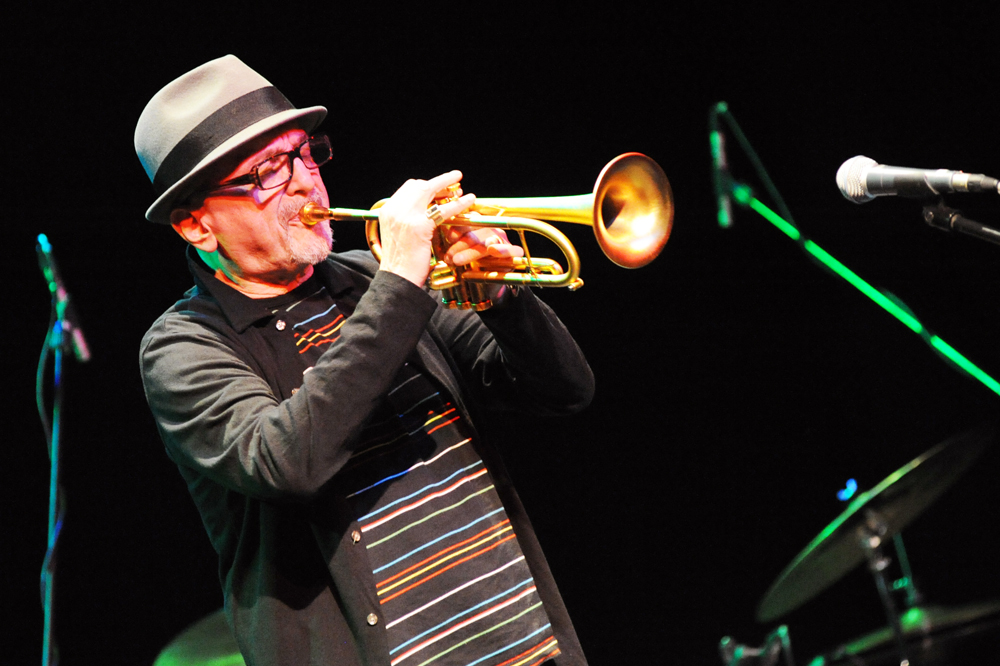
Performing at the "Szakala Day" charity concert in Warsaw, November 2010

Stańko's autobiography Desperado was published in Poland in 2010, a multi-part interview conducted by Rafał Księżyk. In November 2010 he took part in the "Dzień Szakala" (The Day of the Jackal) charity concert, in Warsaw, in aid of saxophonist Tomasz Szukalski. In 2011 the Smithsonian Institution, the world's largest museum and education and research complex, published the six-disc compilation Jazz: The Smithsonian Anthology, which closes with "Suspended Night Variation VIII" by Stańko.

The second decade of the 21st century saw the emergence of Stańko's new poetry-based project. Its beginnings date back to 2009 when Jerzy Ilg, editor-in-chief of Znak Publishing House, invited the trumpeter to one of the last poetry nights of Wisława Szymborska. During the meeting at the Kraków Opera, the poet read her poems, with Stańko accompanying her on the trumpet. The CD recording from this concert was incorporated with Here, the next volume of poems published by Szymborska. Meeting the poet became the key to a new stage in Stańko's career and some of her poems provided the inspiration for new compositions and titles. He dedicated to her his album Wisława, recorded with a new New York quartet featuring Thomas Morgan, Gerald Cleaver and David Virelles, and released by ECM in 2013.

in 2014 Stańko was invited to compose a suite on the occasion of the opening of the core exhibition of the POLIN Museum of the History of Polish Jews. It was released as the album POLIN, recorded in New York with Ravi Coltrane, David Virelles, Dezron Douglas and Kush Abadey.

Stańko last studio album December Avenue was released on 31 March 2017. Reviewing the album The Guardian jazz critic John Fordham wrote: "Nobody holds a single, long-blown trumpet note like the Polish pioneer Tomasz Stańko – a wearily exhaled, soberly ironic, yet oddly awestruck sound that is unique in jazz."

On 14 January 2014, Stańko received the "Polityka Passport" for his work as a cultural leader. On the same day, in Paris, the l'Académie du jazz, under the leadership of François Lacharme, awarded him the Prix du Musicien Européen – the European Music Award of the Year – for his current achievements and his lifetime achievement.

On 15 January 2014, he received one of the three honorary Preis der deutschen Schallplattenkritik (PdSK) awards, granted by an independent association of over 140 music journalists from Germany, Austria and Switzerland.

Stańko was the organizer and director of the Jazzowa Jesień festival in Bielsko-Biała, Poland. He also became a member of the honorary committee supporting Bronisław Komorowski before the presidential elections in Poland in 2015.

In March 2018, due to suspected pneumonia, his April concerts were cancelled. Stańko died of lung cancer, in the oncological hospital in Warsaw on 29 July 2018. The following day ECM Records published a video tribute to Stańko, on its YouTube channel, entitled "Remembering Tomasz Stanko". Fellow musician Dave Holland praised him as "a unique musician with deep feelings and a gentle soul".

== Critical appreciation ==
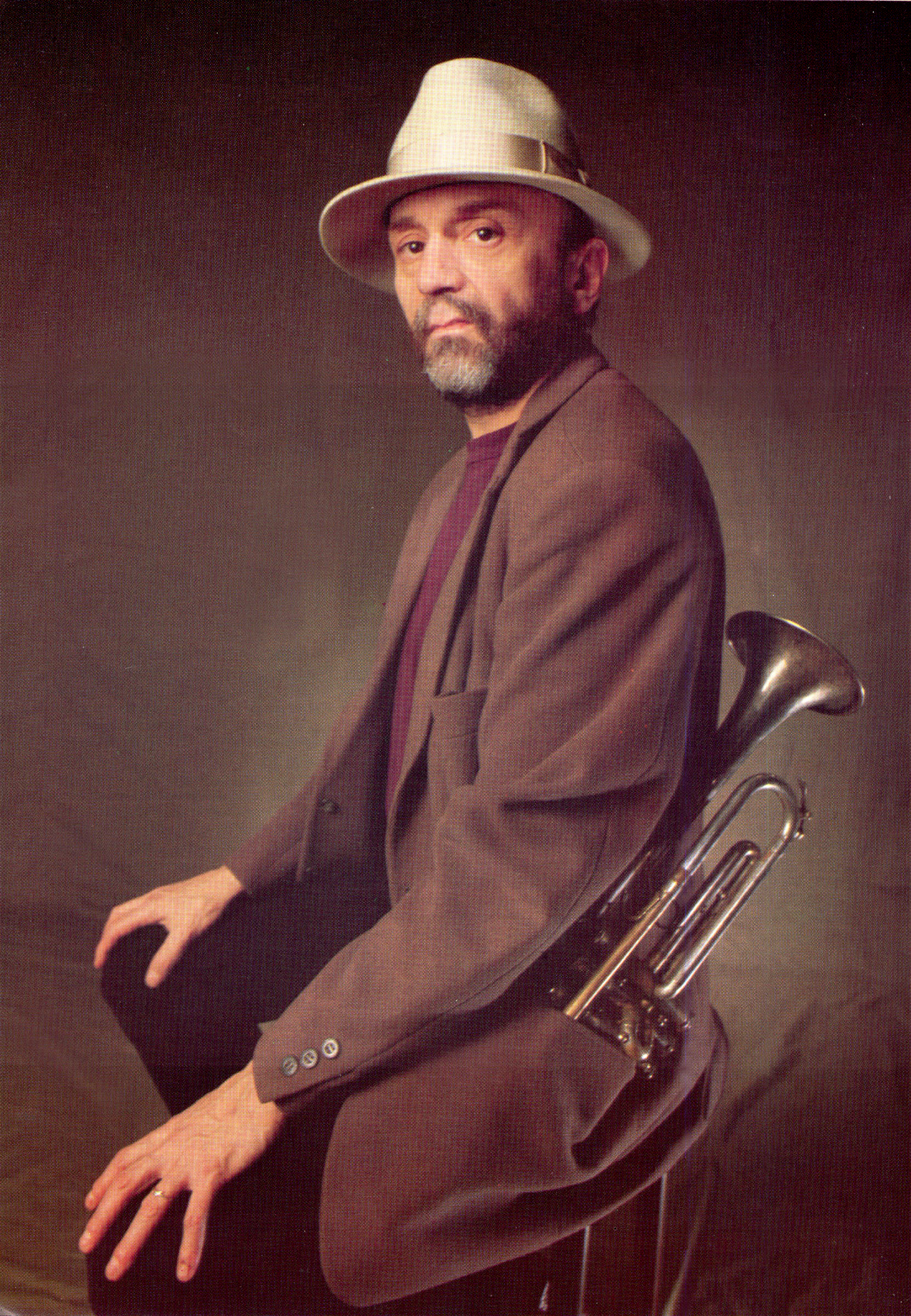
Stańko in 1993

Derek Richardson, writing for the San Francisco Chronicle said, "Tomasz Stanko is not the first jazz musician to negotiate a rapprochement between gorgeous melodies and free improvisation. But he is one of the most eloquent proponents of extemporaneous lyricism working today." Author Brian Morton compared Stanko's lyricism to that of Miles Davis, calling it a "direct but individual offshoot."

== Discography ==
=== As leader ===
Year	Title	Label
1974	Fish Face	Poljazz
1974	TWET with Tomasz Szukalski, Edward Vesala, Peter Warren	PN Muza
1975	Tomasz Stańko & Adam Makowicz Unit (pl) with Adam Makowicz and Czesław Bartkowski	JG Records
1976	Unit (pl) with Adam Makowicz, Paweł Jarzębski and Czesław Bartkowski	PSJ
1976	Balladyna	ECM
1976	Live at Remont with Edward Vesala Quartet	Helicon
1979	Almost Green	Leo Records
1980	Music from Taj Mahal and Karla Caves	Leo Records
1983	Stańko (W Pałacu Prymasowskim) ("At the Primate's Palace")	Poljazz
1984	Music 81	PN Muza
1985	A i J	Poljazz
1985	C.O.C.X.	Pronit
1986	Korozje with Andrzej Kurylewicz	Poljazz
1986	Lady Go...	PN Muza
1988	Witkacy Peyotl / Freelectronic	Poljazz
1988	The Montreux Performance a.k.a. Switzerland; Tomasz Stańko Freelectronic	PN Muza / ITM Germany
1989	Chameleon	Utopia
1989	Polish Jazz Vol. 8 (compilation of PN Muza releases)	PN Muza
1991	Tales for a Girl, 12, and a Shaky Chica	JAM
1992	Bluish	Power Bros
1993	Bosonossa and Other Ballads	GOWI
1994	Balladyna – Theatre Play Compositions	GOWI
1996	Roberto Zucco	Polonia
1997	Leosia	ECM
1999	From the Green Hill	ECM
2004	Selected Recordings – Rarum XVII	ECM
2005	Wolność w sierpniu ("Freedom in August")	FIRe
2008	Freelectronic in Montreux	NewEdition
2014	Polin	Polin

=== Tomasz Stańko Quintet ===
Title	Album details	Peak chart positions		Sales	Certifications
Title	Album details	POL	US Jazz	Sales	Certifications
Music For K	Released: 1970; Label: Polskie Nagrania Muza; Formats: LP, CD	—	—		
Jazzmessage from Poland	Released: 1972; Label: JG Records; Formats: LP, CD	—	—		
Purple Sun	Released: 1973; Label: Calig Records; Formats: LP, CD	—	—		
Dark Eyes	Released: 19 October 2009; Label: ECM Records; Formats: CD, digital download	5	16	POL: 10,000+	POL: Platinum
"—" denotes a recording that did not chart or was not released in that territory.

=== Tomasz Stańko Quartet ===
Title	Album details	Peak chart positions		Sales	Certifications
Title	Album details	POL	US Top Jazz	Sales	Certifications
Matka Joanna	Released: 4 September 1995; Label: ECM Records; Formats: CD, digital download	—	—		
Soul of Things	Released: 14 January 2002; Label: ECM Records; Formats: CD, digital download	20	—	POL: 10,000+	POL: Gold
Suspended Night	Released: 16 March 2004; Label: ECM Records; Formats: CD, digital download	10	20	POL: 10,000+	POL: Gold
Lontano	Released: 29 August 2006; Label: ECM Records; Formats: CD, digital download	16	14	POL: 5,000+	POL: Gold
"—" denotes a recording that did not chart or was not released in that territory.

=== Tomasz Stańko New York Quartet ===
Title	Album details	Peak chart positions
Title	Album details	POL
Wisława	Released: 12 February 2013; Label: ECM Records; Formats: CD, digital download	10
December Avenue	Released: 31 March 2017; Label: ECM Records; Formats: CD, digital download	–
"—" denotes a recording that did not chart or was not released in that territory.

=== Tomasz Stańko Septet ===
Title	Album details	Sales	Certifications
Litania: Music of Krzysztof Komeda	Released: 23 September 1997; Label: ECM Records; Formats: CD, digital download	POL: 10,000+	POL: Gold

=== Video albums ===
Title	Video details	Notes
Sounds Like Christmas	Released: 16 November 2004; Label: Euroarts; Formats: DVD	with Angelika Kirchschlager, Gottfried von der Goltz and the Freiburg Baroque Orchestra

=== Soundtracks ===
Title	Album details
A Farewell to Maria	Released: 1994; Label: GOWI Records; Formats: CD
Reich	Released: 13 February 2001; Label: Universal Music Poland; Formats: CD
Egzekutor	Released: 4 September 2001; Label: Universal Music Poland; Formats: CD
Homeland Netflix series music of end 4th season	

=== Scandinavian Art Ensemble With Tomasz Stańko ===
- The Copenhagen Session Vol. 1, April Records 2025
- The Copenhagen Session Vol. 2, April Records 2025

=== Appearances ===
Album	Year
Krzysztof Komeda – Astigmatic	1966
Globe Unity Orchestra – Globe Unity 67 & 70	1970
Dżamble – Wołanie O Słońce Nad Światem	1971
Piotr Figiel – Piotr	1971
Tadeusz Prejzner – Spacer Brzegiem Morza	1972
Maryla Rodowicz – Wyznanie	1972
Novi Singers – Rien Ne Va Plus	1973
Jan "Ptaszyn" Wróblewski – Sprzedawcy Glonów	1973
Edward Vesala – Satu	1977
Edward Vesala – Heavylife	1980
Gary Peacock – Voice from the Past – Paradigm	1981
Graham Collier – Hoarded Dreams	1983
Cecil Taylor – Winged Serpent (Sliding Quadrants)	1985
Nicolas Simion – Dinner for Don Carlos	1991
Leszek Możdżer – Chopin – Impresje	1994
Mark O'Leary and Billy Hart – Levitation	2005

== Books ==
- Stanko, Tomasz (2010). Desperado!. Krakow: Wydawnictwo Literackie. ISBN 978-8308053263.
