= Nicolas Kummert =

Belgian musician

Nicolas Kummert (born March 12, 1979) is a Belgian jazz singer and tenor saxophonist.

== Biography ==
In 2001 Kummert graduated at the Brussels conservatory with teachers Jeroen Van Herzeele and John Ruocco. He was also taught by Fabrizio Cassol. Kummert already won several prizes, e.g. the Golden Django for best young talent in 2003.

He has played and recorded with musicians like the Alexi Tuomarila quartet, the group of Karl Jannuska, Jef Neve's 'Groove Thing', Yves Peeters, Qu4tre and Pierre Van Dormael. He also worked with African singers like Manu Dibango and DJ's. In 2010 he released the first album with his group 'Nicolas Kummert Voices', together with Herve Samb and Nicolas Thys. They sing more poetic lyrics and recite in a setting of jazz improvisation and African grooves, funk and dubs. Among the songs are some covers, for example, of "Close to You" (the Carpenters) and "Monk's Dream" (Thelonious Monk).

== Bands ==
- Alchimie
- Alex Tuomarila Quartet
- Namur Sax Quartet

== Discography ==
=== Solo albums ===
- 2017: La diversité (Edition Records)

With 'Nicolas Kummert Voices'

- 2010: One (Prova Records)
- 2014: Liberté (Prova Records)

=== Collaborations ===
With 'Alexi Tuomarila Quartet'

- 2001: Voices Of Pohjola (Igloo)
- 2003: 02 (Finlandia Records, Warner Jazz)
- 2008: Runo X (Edita Cambayá)

With Alchimie

- 2001: Alchimie (Igloo)

With 'Jef Neve Trio'

- 2003: Nobody Is Illegal (Universal Music Belgium)

With 'Yves Peeters Group'

- 2010: Sound Tracks (W.E.R.F.)
- 2013: All You See (W.E.R.F.)

With 'Matthieu Marthouret Organ Quartet'

- 2012: Upbeats (Double Moon Records)

With 'Matthieu Marthouret Organ Quartet'

- 2012: Upbeats (Double Moon Records)

With Viktor Lazlo

- 2012: My Name Is Billie Holiday (amc)

With 'Gyle Waddy

- 2012: Since I Fell For Youææ (The Eclectic Album, Vol. II) (Elyts Records)

With Drifter

- 2015: Flow (Edition Records)
