= Wisława (album) =

Studio album by Tomasz Stańko's New York Quartet
- Released: March 19, 2013
- Recorded: June 2012
- Studio: Avatar (New York, New York)
- Genre: Jazz
- Length: 100:24
- Label: ECM; ECM 2304/05
- Producer: Manfred Eicher

Tomasz Stańko chronology
Dark Eyes (2009)	Wisława (2013)	December Avenue (2016)

Wisława is an album by Polish jazz trumpeter and composer Tomasz Stańko's New York Quartet. Dedicated to poet and Nobel Prize-winner Wisława Szymborska, the album was recorded in 2012 and released on the ECM label the following year.

== Reception ==
Professional ratings
Review scores
Source	Rating
Allmusic	4/5 stars
The Guardian	4/5 stars

The Allmusic review by Thom Jurek awarded the album 4 stars stating "Throughout this set, Stańko leads this band as he has many others: by example. His democratic sensibilities allow his players to be fully themselves through his compositions, in turn adding depth and heft to them. Wisława deftly celebrates in a deliberate way, not only the memory of an honored person in Stańko's life, but also the profound inspiration of her life's work upon his own".

Writing in The Guardian, John Fordham observed "Wisława is a dream-ticket jazz meeting between a cutting-edge European legend, and an equally honed triumvirate of pioneering New York-based youth".

The JazzTimes review by Lloyd Sachs said "What makes Wisława (pronounced vees-WAH-vah) striking is Stanko’s ability to push into a more assertive, wide-awake style, rhythmically as well as melodically, without sacrificing the dark-glowing, middle-of-the-night emotion for which he’s known".

The All About Jazz review by John Kelman said that "With Wisława, Stańko has it all, with a group whose possibilities already seem limitless. With an unmistakable allegiance to the tradition, even as it twists, turns and occasionally collapses its supporting structures and introduces incidental contextual ideas from beyond, Stańko's New York Quartet feels like the group he's been searching for all along"

== Track listing ==
All compositions by Tomasz Stańko except as indicated

Disc One:

1. "Wisława" - 10:19
2. "Assassins" - 7:45
3. "Metafizyka" - 7:36
4. "Dernier Cri" - 10:16
5. "Mikrokosmos" - 8:20
6. "Song for H" - 4:38

Disc Two:

1. "Oni" - 6:30
2. "April Story" - 7:06
3. "Tutaj – Here" - 8:29
4. "Faces" - 8:04
5. "A Shaggy Vandal" - 7:31
6. "Wisława, Var." - 13:13

== Personnel ==
- Tomasz Stańko - trumpet
- David Virelles - piano
- Thomas Morgan - bass
- Gerald Cleaver - drums
