= War Orphans =

Studio album by the Bobo Stenson Trio
- Released: 1998
- Recorded: May 1997
- Studio: Rainbow Studio; Oslo, Norway
- Genre: Jazz
- Length: 54:36
- Label: ECM; ECM 1604
- Producer: Manfred Eicher

Bobo Stenson chronology
Reflections (1993)	War Orphans (1998)	Serenity (1999)

War Orphans is an album by the Bobo Stenson Trio, recorded in May 1997 and released on ECM the following year. The trio features rhythm section Anders Jormin and Jon Christensen.

== Reception ==
Professional ratings
Review scores
Source	Rating
AllMusic	4/5 stars
The Penguin Guide to Jazz Recordings	4/4 stars

The AllMusic review by Thom Jurek stated: "While the last Bobo Stenson Trio offering found the band cohesively searching for a new harmonic language together and separately as composers, on War Orphans they seem to have found it."

== Track listing ==
All compositions by Anders Jormin, except as noted.

1. "Oleo de mujer con sombrero" (Silvio Rodríguez) - 8:32
2. "Natt" - 8:10
3. "All My Life" (Ornette Coleman) - 6:25
4. "Eleventh of January" - 5:58
5. "War Orphans" (Coleman) - 6:17
6. "Sediment" (Jormin) - 5:22
7. "Bengali Blue" (Bobo Stenson) - 8:18
8. "Melancholia" (Duke Ellington) - 5:28

== Personnel ==
=== Bobo Stenson Trio ===
- Bobo Stenson – piano
- Anders Jormin – bass
- Jon Christensen – drums

== See also ==
- Robinson Crusoes of Warsaw
- Wolf children
