= Leosia (album) =

Studio album by Tomasz Stańko
- Released: 1997
- Recorded: January 1996
- Studios: Rainbow Studio; Oslo, Norway
- Genre: Jazz
- Length: 62:28
- Labels: ECM; ECM 1603
- Producer: Manfred Eicher

Tomasz Stańko chronology
Roberto Zucco (1995)	Leosia (1997)	Litania – Music of Krzysztof Komeda (1997)

Leosia is an album by Polish jazz trumpeter and composer Tomasz Stańko recorded in January 1996 and released on ECM the following year. The quartet features rhythm section Bobo Stenson, Anders Jormin and Tony Oxley.

== Reception ==
The AllMusic review by Michael G. Nastos awarded the album 3½ stars stating "As ECM recordings go, Leosia is one of the label's, and certainly trumpeter Tomasz Stanko's, definitive introspective and sedate musical statements. Not that in either instance these qualities have been in short supply, but here those themes of lush romanticism, thinly veiled mysticism, and pure ethereal thought could not be more concentrated or emphasized... Clearly a project moved by the death of a friend, it is a reminder of how life is fleeting, and words unspoken until it is too late can muster these feelings of abject regret."

The Penguin Guide to Jazz selected this album as part of its suggested Core Collection and awarded it a "Crown."

Professional ratings
Review scores
Source	Rating
Penguin Guide to Jazz	+ "Crown"
Allmusic	3.5/5 stars

== Track listing ==
All compositions by Tomasz Stańko except as indicated.

1. "Morning Heavy Song" – 6:45
2. "Die Weisheit von le Comte Lautréamont" – 6:11
3. "A Farewell to Maria" – 7:42
4. "Brace" (Anders Jormin, Tony Oxley) – 4:10
5. "Trinity" (Jormin, Oxley, Bobo Stenson) – 5:05
6. "Forlorn Walk" (Jormin, Oxley, Stańko) – 2:12
7. "Hungry Howl" – 9:53
8. "No Bass Trio" (Oxley, Stańko, Stenson) – 6:02
9. "Euforila" – 5:06
10. "Leosia" – 9:22

== Personnel ==
- Tomasz Stańko – trumpet
- Bobo Stenson – piano
- Anders Jormin – bass
- Tony Oxley – drums
