= Trees of Light =

Studio album by Anders Jormin / Lena Willemark / Karin Nakagawa
- Released: 6 March 2015
- Recorded: May 2013
- Studio: Studio Epidemin; Göteborg, Sweden
- Genre: Jazz
- Length: 56:34
- Label: ECM; ECM 2406
- Producer: Anders Jormin and Johannes Lundberg

Anders Jormin albums chronology
Years (2014)	Trees of Light (2015)

Lena Willemark chronology
The Nordan Suite (2014)	Trees of Light (2015)	Blåferdį (2016)

Professional ratings
Review scores
Source	Rating
All About Jazz	4.5/5 stars

Trees of Light is an album by Swedish bassist and composer Anders Jormin recorded in May 2013 and released on ECM in March 2015. The trio features Swedish fiddler and singer Lena Willemark and Japanese koto player Karin Nakagawa.

== Reception ==
John Kelman in All About Jazz gave a four and a half stars to this album saying, "While there are moments of frenetic activity, the overall aesthetic of the album is one of space and the allowance for every instrument to occupy its own layer without ever getting in the way of the others."

In The Jazz Breakfast, Peter Bacon says that Trees of Light is "a gorgeous album" and that "The trio ebbs and flows, breathes and sighs, weaves in and out with a grace and energy as natural as the sea on the shore or the wind in the trees."

== Track listing ==
All tracks are written by Lena Willemark except as noted.

No.	Title	Writer(s)	Length
1.	"Krippainggler"	Karin Nakagawa	8:43
2.	"Dröm"	Anders Jormin	3:55
3.	"Jag Starkvar"	Jormin	3:19
4.	"Urbanus"		4:02
5.	"Hirajochi"	Jormin	5:58
6.	"Minni"		2:03
7.	"Ogadh Dett"	Jormin	5:39
8.	"Lyöstraini"		5:14
9.	"Slingerpolska"		2:28
10.	"Uoruo"		5:59
11.	"Lyösfridhn"	Nakagawa	4:48
12.	"Vilda Vindar"		4:26
Total length:			56:34

== Personnel ==
- Anders Jormin – double bass
- Lena Willemark – voice, fiddle, viola
- Karin Nakagawa – 25-string koto
