= Suspended Night =

Studio album by Tomasz Stańko
- Released: February 9, 2004
- Recorded: July 2003
- Studio: Rainbow Studio; Oslo, Norway
- Genre: Jazz
- Length: 69:01
- Label: ECM; ECM 1868
- Producer: Manfred Eicher

Tomasz Stańko chronology
Soul of Things (2001)	Suspended Night (2004)	Lontano (2005)

Suspended Night is an album by the Tomasz Stańko Quartet recorded in July 2003 and released on ECM February the following year. The quartet features rhythm section Marcin Wasilewski, Slawomir Kurkiewicz and Michal Miskiewicz.

== Reception ==
Professional ratings
Review scores
Source	Rating
Allmusic	4/5 stars
The Penguin Guide to Jazz Recordings	4/4 stars
The Village Voice	A−

Reviewing for The Village Voice in July 2004, Tom Hull said, "this is built from series of non-obvious variations, and takes a while to come into focus. Think of them as settings for the gemlike clarity of Stanko's trumpet."

The AllMusic review by Thom Jurek awarded the album 4 stars stating

"Suspended Night, on ECM, follows the hugely successful Soul of Things on the same label. It is only the second international offering from this group, but the flowering and maturation of this creative relationship are nothing if not utterly stunning. This ensemble has developed its own bravely compelling yet tonally accessible voice in articulating Stanko's unique compositional language; it is one that opens up the jazz tradition from the inside in startling and wonderful new directions... This a major new lyric statement that actually looks at jazz as a future music of unfolding investigation rather than as merely a historic tradition celebrating itself. Suspended Night is essential for any serious jazz fan and a wonderful introduction to Stanko's music as well."

In the feature "1000 albums to hear before you die", the album was described by The Guardian as a "near-perfect jazz album, in which Polish trumpet maestro Stanko, abetted by a dazzling young trio, says something new and beautiful with the styles and syntax of an earlier time. Each detail sounds fresh and joyous, while Stanko's inspired and emotional themes and solos fly high above."

== Track listing ==
All compositions by Tomasz Stańko except as indicated.

1. "Song for Sarah" – 5:33
2. "Suspended Variations I" – 8:53
3. "Suspended Variations II" – 8:24
4. "Suspended Variations III" – 7:13
5. "Suspended Variations IV" – 7:04
6. "Suspended Variations V" – 4:23
7. "Suspended Variations VI" – 8:58
8. "Suspended Variations VII" – 3:26
9. "Suspended Variations VIII" (Stańko, Wasilewski, Kurkiewicz, Miskiewicz) – 4:24
10. "Suspended Variations IX" – 5:56
11. "Suspended Variations X" (Stańko, Wasilewski, Kurkiewicz, Miskiewicz) – 4:47

== Personnel ==
- Tomasz Stańko – trumpet
- Marcin Wasilewski – piano
- Slawomir Kurkiewicz – bass
- Michal Miskiewicz – drums
