= Reflections (Bobo Stenson album) =

Studio album by the Bobo Stenson Trio
- Released: 1996
- Recorded: May 1993
- Studio: Rainbow Studio; Oslo, Norway
- Genre: Jazz
- Length: 50:10
- Label: ECM; ECM 1516
- Producer: Manfred Eicher

Bobo Stenson chronology
Very Early (1986)	Reflections (1996)	War Orphans (1997)

Reflections is an album by the Bobo Stenson Trio recorded in May 1993 and released on ECM in 1996. The trio features rhythm section Anders Jormin and Jon Christensen.

== Reception ==
The AllMusic review by Scott Yanow awarded the album 3 stars stating "Stenson shows more energy than one might expect to hear on an ECM date, although he also has several introspective explorations."

Professional ratings
Review scores
Source	Rating
AllMusic	3/5 stars
The Penguin Guide to Jazz Recordings	4/4 stars

== Track listing ==
All compositions by Bobo Stenson except as indicated

1. "The Enlightener" - 6:55
2. "My Man's Gone Now" (George Gershwin, Ira Gershwin, Dubose Heyward) - 6:15
3. "Not" (Anders Jormin) - 4:49
4. "Dorrmattan" - 5:48
5. "Q" (Jormin) - 5:50
6. "Reflections in D" (Duke Ellington) - 5:25
7. "12 Tones Old" - 4:47
8. "Mindiatyr" - 10:21

== Personnel ==
=== Bobo Stenson Trio ===
- Bobo Stenson – piano
- Anders Jormin – double bass
- Jon Christensen – drums
