= Frifot =

Swedish folk music trio

- Origin: Sweden
- Genres: Folk
- Years active: 1987–present
- Members: Ale Möller, Per Gudmundson, Lena Willemark

Frifot is a Swedish folk music trio which was formed in 1987. Its members are Lena Willemark, Per Gudmundson and Ale Möller. When it was first formed, the group called themselves Möller, Willemark & Gudmundson; the name Frifot, literally footloose, comes from the lyrics of one of the songs they play. Over the years, the trio's members have also had solo careers and performed with other groups, but Frifot has never ceased to exist as a group. Their fifth full-length CD was released in October 2007.

The trio has toured in a number of countries including Poland, Great Britain, Germany, France, Italy, Japan, the United States and India, as well as the Nordic countries. Their third tour of the United States, in 2000, included a performance on the radio show A Prairie Home Companion. Their CD Sluring received the Grammis award for the best folk music album of 2003.

== Members ==
- Lena Willemark, vocals, violin, wooden flute
- Per Gudmundson, violin, Swedish bagpipes, vocals
- Ale Möller, mandola, droneflute, wooden flute, shawm, harmonic, low whistle, willow flute, hammered dulcimer, folkharp, vocals

== Discography ==
- Frifot, 1991 (as Möller, Willemark & Gudmundson)
- Järven, 1996
- Frifot, 1999
- Summer Song, 1999 (compilation album)
- Sluring, 2003
- Flyt, 2007
