= December Avenue (Tomasz Stańko album) =

Studio album by the Tomasz Stańko New York Quartet
- Released: March 31, 2017
- Recorded: June 2016
- Studios: Studios la Buissonne; Pernes-les-Fontaines
- Genre: Jazz
- Length: 64:09
- Labels: ECM; ECM 2532
- Producer: Manfred Eicher

Tomasz Stańko chronology
Wisława (2013)	December Avenue (2017)

December Avenue is an album by Tomasz Stańko's New York Quartet recorded in June 2016 and released on ECM March the following year. The album is dedicated to Polish writer Bruno Schulz.

== Reception ==
Professional ratings
Review scores
Source	Rating
Allmusic	3.5/5 stars
The Guardian	4/5 stars
All About Jazz	3.5/5 stars

The AllMusic review by Thom Jurek said "December Avenue is a more deliberate outing than its predecessor, but it's also more intuitive ... As individuals and as a collective, these musicians stay focused on whatever the tune is trying to say. What's more, each player is careful to leave space for his bandmates, not only in solos, but in fills and harmonic feints and shifts. Assembled, this not only makes for a compelling listen, but also reveals the maturity and confidence this quartet has developed since the release of Wisława."

Writing in The Guardian, John Fordham observed "A terrific successor to 2013’s Wislawa, this is just as exquisite an exercise in haunting tone-poetry, occasionally pierced by urgent avant-swing."

The All About Jazz review by Karl Ackermann said that "December Avenue is strikingly balanced and tastefully performed by this well synergized quartet."

The JazzTimes review by Thomas Conrad states "It is not wise to designate one Stanko album as more beautiful than the others. But December Avenue reaches layers within modern consciousness where even Stanko has not been."

== Track listing ==
All compositions by Tomasz Stańko except where noted

1. "Cloud" – 4:13
2. "Conclusion" (Stańko, David Virelles, Gerald Cleaver, Reuben Rogers) – 2:01
3. "Blue Cloud" – 8:52
4. "Bright Moon" – 7:19
5. "Burning Hot" – 5:05
6. "David and Reuben" (Stańko, Virelles, Cleaver, Rogers) – 1:30
7. "Ballad for Bruno Schulz" – 6:26
8. "Sound Space" (Stańko, Virelles, Cleaver, Rogers) – 4:04
9. "December Avenue" – 6:33
10. "The Street of Crocodiles" – 6:08
11. "Yankiels Lid" – 6:07
12. "Young Girl in Flower" – 5:57

== Personnel ==
=== New York Quartet ===
- Tomasz Stańko – trumpet
- David Virelles – piano
- Reuben Rogers – bass
- Gerald Cleaver – drums
