= Lontano (album) =

Recording by Tomasz Stanko

Studio album by the Tomasz Stańko Quartet
- Released: 2006
- Recorded: November 2005
- Studio: Studios la Buissonne; Pernes-les-Fontaines
- Genre: Jazz
- Length: 76:52
- Label: ECM; ECM 1980
- Producer: Manfred Eicher

Tomasz Stańko chronology
Suspended Night (2003)	Lontano (2006)	Dark Eyes (2009)

Lontano is an album by the Tomasz Stańko Quartet, recorded in November 2005 and released on ECM the following year. The quartet features rhythm section Marcin Wasilewski, Slawomir Kurkiewicz and Michal Miskiewicz.

== Reception ==
The AllMusic review by Thom Jurek awarded the album 4 stars stating "Lontano showcases a band confident enough after playing for five years to find real space for free improvisation... Lontano is at once the distillation of 40 years of European vanguard jazz history, and at once the key in the door of the lock where it enters the world not as a music categorized by its instrumentation or personnel, but as music itself; where harmonics, space, and the improvisational language expressed in it transcends genre and classification. This band is simply astonishing, and Lontano is their most adventurous and cohesive recording yet."

Professional ratings
Review scores
Source	Rating
Allmusic	4/5 stars
The Penguin Guide to Jazz Recordings	4/4 stars

== Track listing ==
All compositions by Tomasz Stańko except as indicated

1. "Lontano I" (Tomasz Stańko, Marcin Wasilewski, Slawomir Kurkiewicz, Michal Miskiewicz) – 12:53
2. "Cyrhla" – 7:07
3. "Song for Ania" – 7:44
4. "Kattorna" (Krzysztof Komeda) – 6:32
5. "Lontano II" (Stańko, Wasilewski, Kurkiewicz, Miskiewicz) – 15:04
6. "Sweet Thing" – 6:50
7. "Trista" – 4:44
8. "Lontano III" (Stańko, Wasilewski, Kurkiewicz, Miskiewicz) – 12:03
9. "Tale" – 3:55

== Personnel ==
=== Tomasz Stańko Quartet ===
- Tomasz Stańko – trumpet
- Marcin Wasilewski – piano
- Slawomir Kurkiewicz – bass
- Michal Miskiewicz – drums
