= Dark Eyes (Tomasz Stańko album) =

Studio album by Tomasz Stańko
- Released: October 9, 2009
- Recorded: April 2009
- Studio: Studios la Buissonne; Pernes-les-Fontaines
- Genre: Jazz
- Length: 61:38
- Label: ECM; ECM 2115
- Producer: Manfred Eicher

Tomasz Stańko chronology
Lontano (2005)	Dark Eyes (2009)	Wisława (2013)

Dark Eyes is an album by the Tomasz Stańko Quintet recorded in April 2009 and released on ECM later that same year. The quintet features Stańko on trumpet, Jakob Bro on guitar, Alexi Tuomarila on piano, Anders Christensen on bass guitar, and Olavi Louhivuori on drums.

== Reception ==
The AllMusic review by Michael G. Nastos awarded the album 3½ stars stating "With the late-night aspect emphasized and the ECM precept fully realized, Dark Eyes represents yet another triumph for this extraordinary artist, who always pulls back and digs deep into the wellspring of emotion with every passing moment."

Professional ratings
Review scores
Source	Rating
Allmusic	3.5/5 stars

== Track listing ==
All compositions by Tomasz Stańko except as indicated.

1. "So Nice" – 5:55
2. "Terminal 7" – 5:30
3. "The Dark Eyes of Martha Hirsch" – 10:05
4. "Grand Central" – 6:27
5. "Amsterdam Avenue" – 6:13
6. "Samba Nova" – 9:23
7. "Dirge for Europe" (Krzysztof Komeda) – 5:29
8. "May Sun" – 2:47
9. "Last Song" – 4:00
10. "Etiuda Baletowa No.3" (Komeda) – 5:49

== Personnel ==
- Tomasz Stańko – trumpet
- Jakob Bro – guitar
- Alexi Tuomarila – piano
- Anders Christensen – bass guitar
- Olavi Louhivuori – drums
