= Contra la Indecisión =

Studio album by the Bobo Stenson Trio
- Released: January 19, 2018
- Recorded: May 2017
- Studio: Auditorio Stelio Molo RSI Studio; Lugano, Switzerland
- Genre: Jazz
- Length: 1:04:41
- Label: ECM; ECM 2582
- Producer: Manfred Eicher

The Bobo Stenson Trio chronology
Indicum (2011)	Contra la Indecisión (2018)

Contra la indecisión is a studio album by the Bobo Stenson Trio recorded in May 2017 and released on ECM in January the following year. The trio features rhythm section Anders Jormin and Jon Fält.

== Reception ==
Professional ratings
Review scores
Source	Rating
Allmusic	4/5 stars
All About Jazz	4/5 stars
JazzTrail	A−
Tom Hull	B+

AllMusic awarded the album 4 stars with the review by Thom Jurek stating "Contra la Indecision is the first recording by Bobo Stenson's trio in six years ... The trio has matured greatly and they are more flexible, confident, and speculative ... As a whole, Contra la Indecision is more colorful, more varied, and brighter than anything the pianist has released this century, making it a welcome return."

All About Jazz reviewer Karl Ackermann said, "Stenson's own style is easily recognizable and is especially well-served in the company of Jormin and Fält. Not all of Stenson's work has the bursts of color that we hear in Contra La Indecision and that makes it one of his most interesting albums to date."

JazzTrail called it "another poetic work comprising ravishing originals", noting that by "Avoiding standards in his repertoire, Stenson displays the highly developed language that has been characterizing his cultivated playing throughout all these years. He also evinces a distinctive complicity with his trio mates, which obviously has positive repercussions in their sound. And how they seemed to have fun riding these sonic waves!"

In JazzTimes, Michael J. West wrote "Contra la Indecisión is scintillating, soothing … and soporific. It is not to be attempted without a cup of coffee. Its sleep charm overcome, however, pianist Bobo Stenson and his longtime trio (bassist Anders Jormin, drummer Jon Fält) offer soundscapes of atmospheric beauty and stunning interplay in its melodies and texture."

== Track listing ==
All tracks are written by Anders Jormin except as noted

No.	Title	Writer(s)	Length
1.	"Canción contra la indecisión"	Silvio Rodríguez	4:12
2.	"Doubt Thou the Stars"		7:57
3.	"Wedding Song from Poniky"	Béla Bartók	7:26
4.	"Three Shades of a House"		7:11
5.	"Elégie"	Erik Satie	6:11
6.	"Canción y danza VI"	Federico Mompou	5:14
7.	"Alice"	Stenson	6:19
8.	"Oktoberhavet"		5:52
9.	"Kalimba Impressions"	Fält; Jormin; Stenson	3:12
10.	"Stilla"		4:27
11.	"Hemingway Intonations"		6:40

== Personnel ==
=== Bobo Stenson Trio ===
- Bobo Stenson – piano
- Anders Jormin – bass
- Jon Fält – drums
