= Lena Willemark =

Swedish musician

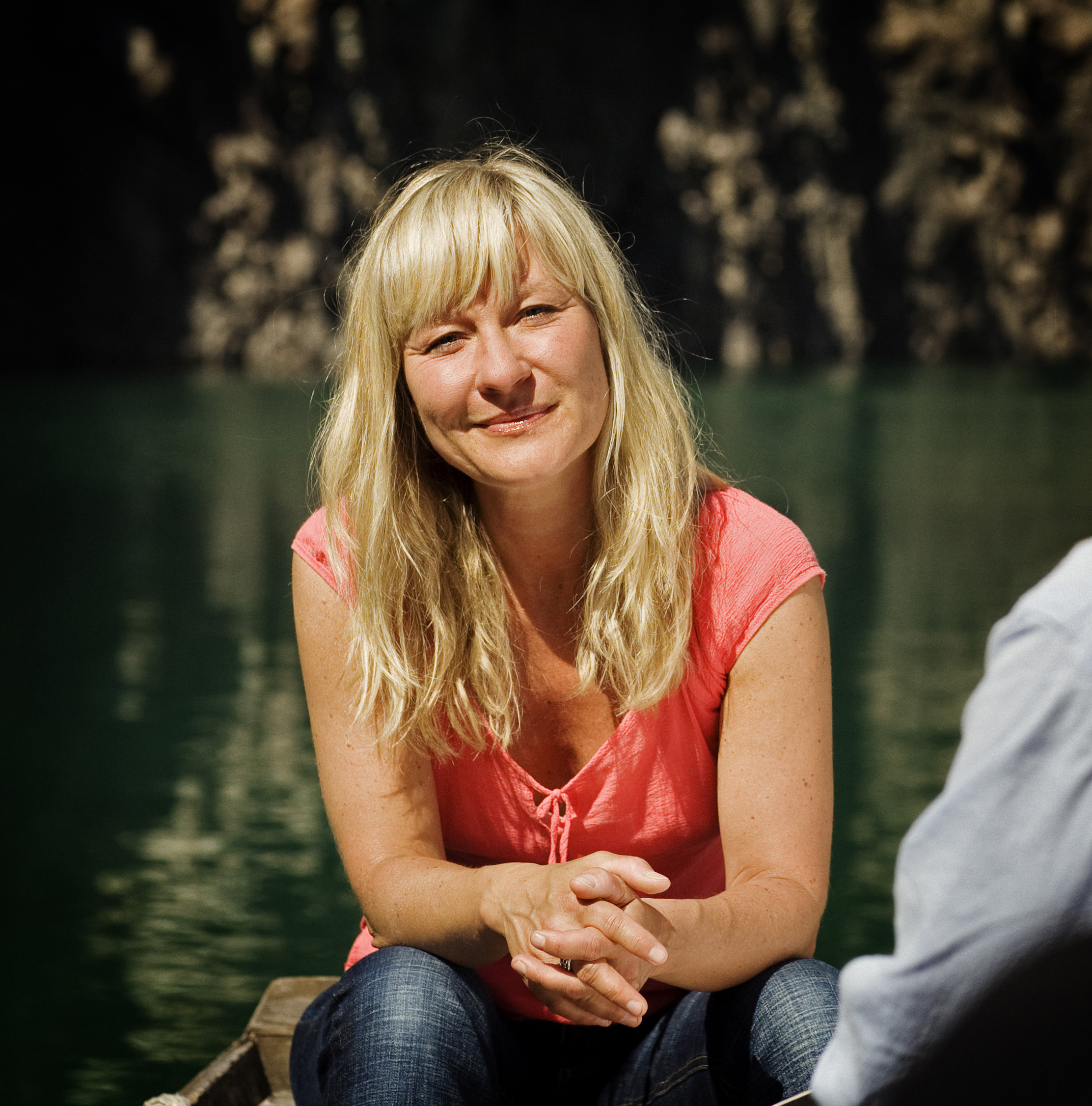
Lena Willemark in 2013

Lena Willemark (born 12 May 1960) is a Swedish traditional music fiddler, singer, and composer, who combines elements of folk and jazz.

Born in Älvdalen, Dalarna, Willemark grew up with the region's folk music. In Stockholm in the 1970s, she also had contact with jazz. She has collaborated with groups such as Frifot, Enteli, Elise Einarsdotter, and composer Karin Rehnqvist. She recorded Nordan with Ale Möller, winning in 1994 both a Grammis and the Preis der Deutschen Schallplattenkritik. Commissioned by Stockholm, Cultural Capital of Europe in 1998, she composed and performed Windogur.

For several decades Willemark has broadened her scope through collaborations with jazz musicians and other artists. She is also a member of the Royal Swedish Academy of Music and is often seen on stage across Sweden and abroad.

== Discography ==
- Lena Willemark När som gräset det vajar, 1989
- Lena Willemark/Ale Möller/Per Gudmundsson Frifot, 1991
- Frifot with Kirsten Bråten-Berg, Musique des vallées scandinaves (Suède - Norvège), 1993
- Lena Willemark/Ale Möller Nordan, 1994 (ECM)
- Enteli Enteli, 1994
- Elise Einardotter Ensemble Senses, 1995
- Ale Möller Hästen och Tranan, 1996
- Lena Willemark/Ale Möller Agram, 1996 (ECM)
- Frifot Järven, 1996
- Enteli Live, 1997
- Frifot Frifot, 1999 (ECM)
- Lena Willemark Windogur, 2000
- Frifot Sluring, 2003
- Lena Willemark Älvdalens Elektriska, 2006
- Frifot Flyt, 2007
- Trees of Light, 2015 - with Anders Jormin and Karin Nakagawa

Willemark also appears on a number of other recordings and compilations, including:

- Hector Zazou Songs from the Cold Seas, 1994
- Johan Hedin Angel Archipelago, 1998
- Groupa Månskratt, 1990
- Rita Marcotulli, Koinè, 2002
- Anders Jormin In Winds, In Light (ECM), 2003 (ECM)
- Kirsten Bråten Berg Stemmenes skygge (Heilo), with Marilyn Mazur, 2005
- Various artists Finlir och Gold (compilation)
- Various artists Varjehanda folkmusik (Musica Sveciae 3)
- Various artists Lockrop & vallåtar (Musica Sveciae 8)
- Various artists Blod, lik & tårar (Musica Sveciae 19)
- Various artists Folkmusik i förvandling (Musica Sveciae 25)
- Various artists Visfolk och tralltokar
- Various artists Carl Michael Bellman
- Various artists Folksamling
