= In Winds, In Light =

Studio album by Anders Jormin
- Released: 2004
- Recorded: May 2003
- Studio: Organ Hall, Musikhögskolan Gothenburg, Sweden
- Genre: Jazz
- Length: 61:23
- Label: ECM; ECM 1866
- Producer: Anders Jormin

Anders Jormin chronology
Xieyi (2001)	In Winds, In Light (2004)	Aviaja (2005)

In Winds, In Light is an album by Swedish bassist and composer Anders Jormin recorded in May 2003 and released on ECM the following year.

== Reception ==
The AllMusic review by Thom Jurek awarded the album 4 stars stating "This is a startling record, literally unlike anything ever heard before. These players make wonderful use of space and dynamic, and the manner in which they interact is as one... This record may not be for everyone, but it is surprisingly accessible and has literally no new age connotations. This is music that may approximate the harmony of the spheres, but it does so from the ground—from the heart of the heart of the matter—up."

Professional ratings
Review scores
Source	Rating
Allmusic	4/5 stars
The Penguin Guide to Jazz Recordings	3/4 stars

== Track listing ==
All compositions by Anders Jormin except as indicated

1. "Vårstäv (Spring Saying)" - 1:09
2. "Introitus" - 1:36
3. "Sång 80 (Song 80)" (Anders Jormin, Harry Martinson) - 6:08
4. "Choral" - 8:27
5. "In Winds" - 3:01
6. "Sandstone" - 2:01
7. "Allt" (Lotta Olsson-Anderberg, Jormin) - 6:36
8. "Soapstone" - 2:09
9. "Gryning (Dawn)" - 3:30
10. "Each Man" (William Blake, Jormin) - 0:53
11. "Transition" - 1:08
12. "Flying" - 3:09
13. "Sommarorgel (Summer Organ)" (Johannes Edfelt, Jormin) - 4:48
14. "Love Song" - 6:33
15. "Limestone" - 1:26
16. "En Gång (Some Day)" (Jormin, Pär Lagerkvist) - 8:49

== Personnel ==
- Anders Jormin – bass
- Lena Willemark – voice
- Marilyn Crispell – piano
- Karin Nelson church organ
- Raymond Strid – percussion
- recorded by Johannes Lundberg
