= Nordan =

Studio album by Ale Möller and Lena Willemark
- Released: 1994
- Genre: Nordic folk music
- Label: ECM
- Producer: Hugo & Luigi

Nordan is a collaborative album by Swedish musicians Ale Möller and Lena Willemark released in 1994 by ECM Records.

It was produced by then-president of ECM, Manfred Eicher, who met the duo while attending the premiere of a Arvo Pärt composition in 1992.

== Critical reception ==
Upon the album's release, Billboard called it "heartfelt, transporting music" that could be written yesterday, praising the incorporation of jazz musicians and noting that it could become a success with college radio and "world music devotees". Richard Gehr, reviewing for SPIN, called the album "ambitious", hailing it as "the brilliantly uncategorizable epitome of new Swedish folk alchemy" and stating that the album "transforms nearly forgotten medieval balladry into living tradition". The Advocate called it "an inspired contemporary take" on Swedish folk music and praised Willemark's vocals.

During the 1994 Grammis, the album won the "folkmusik" (folk music) award.

== Track listing ==
No.	Title	Length
1.	"Trilo"	1:16
2.	"KOM Helge Ande"	3:07
3.	"Gullharpan"	6:34
4.	"Mannelig"	4:39
5.	"Polska Efter Roligs Per"	3:01
6.	"Hornlat"	2:12
7.	"Sven I Rosengard"	5:42
8.	"S:T Goran och Draken"	6:19
9.	"Medley"	4:08
10.	"Knut Hauling"	5:52
11.	"Polska Efter Jones Olle"	3:04
12.	"Medley"	6:52
13.	"Jemsken"	1:53
14.	"Medley"	3:29
15.	"Vallsvit"	4:59
16.	"Dromspar-Efterspel"	1:51

== Charts ==
Chart performance for Nordan
Chart (1994)	Peak position
Swedish Albums (Sverigetopplistan)	25
