= From the Green Hill =

Studio album by Tomasz Stańko
- Released: 1998
- Recorded: August 1998
- Studio: Rainbow Studio; Oslo, Norway
- Genre: Jazz
- Length: 73:33
- Label: ECM; ECM 1680
- Producer: Manfred Eicher

Tomasz Stańko chronology
Litania – Music of Krzysztof Komeda (1997)	From the Green Hill (1998)	Soul of Things (2002)

From the Green Hill is an album by Polish jazz trumpeter and composer Tomasz Stańko recorded in August 1998 and released on ECM later that year. The sextet features reed player John Surman, bandoneonist Dino Saluzzi, violinist Michelle Makarski, and rhythm section Anders Jormin and Jon Christensen.

== Reception ==
Professional ratings
Review scores
Source	Rating
AllMusic	4/5 stars
The Penguin Guide to Jazz Recordings	4/4 stars

The AllMusic review by Thom Jurek awarded the album 4 stars stating:

Over 14 tunes, Tomasz Stanko reveals once again why he is a bandleader of great authority and integrity. This is an ensemble of powerful individuals and no less than three composers among them. Stanko's arrangements are carried out with equanimity and grace as well as precision and musicality. The result is an album that, while not as attention grabbing as Litania, is as musically inventive and challenging as its predecessor, and wholly more satisfying than most of what comes from Eastern Europe in the name of jazz at the end of the 20th century.

== Track listing ==
All compositions by Tomasz Stańko except as indicated

1. "Domino" (John Surman) – 8:06
2. "Litania (Part One) (Krzysztof Komeda) – 2:41
3. "Stone Ridge" (Surman) – 8:00
4. "...y despues de todo" – 3:59
5. "Litania (Part Two)" (Komeda) – 2:06
6. "Quintet's Time" – 6:48
7. "Pantronic" – 3:07
8. "The Lark in the Dark" – 6:41
9. "Love Theme from Farewell to Maria" – 6:21
10. "...from the Green Hill" – 7:46
11. "Buschka" – 7:10
12. "Roberto Zucco" – 2:57
13. "Domino's Intro" (Surman) – 1:03
14. "Argentyna" – 6:48

== Personnel ==
- Tomasz Stańko – trumpet
- John Surman – baritone saxophone, bass clarinet
- Dino Saluzzi – bandoneon
- Michelle Makarski – violin
- Anders Jormin – bass
- Jon Christensen – drums
