= Indicum (album) =

Studio album by Bobo Stenson Trio
- Released: 22 October 2012
- Recorded: November & December 2011
- Studio: Auditorium Radio Svizzera; Lugano, Switzerland
- Genre: Jazz
- Length: 78:05
- Label: ECM; ECM 2233
- Producer: Manfred Eicher

Bobo Stenson chronology
| Catando (2007) | Indicum (2012) | Contra la Indecisión (2018) |

Indicum is an album by Swedish pianist Bobo Stenson recorded in late 2011 and released on ECM in October the following year.

== Reception ==
The AllMusic review by Thom Jurek awarded the album 4 stars, stating:

"The Stenson Trio is the rarest of bands, one that approaches its material as a series of queries to be summarily explored, rather than statements to be made. As such, Indicum succeeds in spades."

Professional ratings
Review scores
| Source | Rating |
|---|---|
| Allmusic | 4/5 stars |

== Track listing ==
All compositions by Jon Fält, Anders Jormin and Bobo Stenson except as indicated

1. "Your Story" (Bill Evans) - 2:52
2. "Indikon" - 6:03
3. "Indicum" - 3:10
4. "Ermutigung" (Wolf Biermann) - 5:09
5. "Indigo" - 4:20
6. "December" (Jormin) - 4:55
7. "La Peregrinacion" (Ariel Ramírez) - 8:26
8. "Event VI" (George Russell) - 3:11
9. "Ave Maria" (Traditional) - 7:48
10. "Tit Er Jeg Glad" (Carl Nielsen) - 6:42
11. "Sol" (Jormin) - 9:11
12. "Ubi Caritas" (Ola Gjeilo) - 6:41

== Personnel ==
- Bobo Stenson – piano
- Anders Jormin – bass
- Jon Fält – drums
