= Litania – Music of Krzysztof Komeda =

Studio album by the Tomasz Stańko Septet
- Released: 1997
- Recorded: February 1997
- Studio: Rainbow Studio; Oslo, Norway
- Genre: Jazz
- Length: 65:22
- Label: ECM; ECM 1636
- Producer: Manfred Eicher

Tomasz Stańko chronology
Leosia (1996)	Litania – Music of Krzysztof Komeda (1997)	From the Green Hill (1998)

Litania – Music of Krzysztof Komeda is an album by the Tomasz Stańko Septet recorded in February 1997 and released on ECM later that year, featuring compositions by Krzysztof Komeda. The septet features saxophonists Bernt Rosengren and Joakim Milder and rhythm section Terje Rypdal, Bobo Stenson, Palle Danielsson and Jon Christensen.

== Reception ==
The AllMusic review by Scott Yanow stated: "Depending on one's musical tastes, the results are either dull or intriguing, but definitely picturesque and cinematic."

Professional ratings
Review scores
Source	Rating
AllMusic	4.5/5 stars
The Penguin Guide to Jazz Recordings	4/4 stars

== Track listing ==
All compositions by Krzysztof Komeda

1. "Svantetic" – 11:01
2. "Sleep Safe and Warm (Version 1)" – 3:07
3. "Night-Time, Daytime Requiem" – 21:47
4. "Ballada" – 4:17
5. "Litania" – 6:52
6. "Sleep Safe and Warm (Version 2)" – 2:42
7. "Repetition" – 3:54
8. "Ballad for Bernt" – 3:43
9. "The Witch" – 5:28
10. "Sleep Safe and Warm (Version 3)" – 2:06

== Personnel ==
=== Tomasz Stańko Septet ===
- Tomasz Stańko – trumpet
- Bernt Rosengren – tenor saxophone
- Joakim Milder – tenor and soprano saxophones
- Terje Rypdal – electric guitar
- Bobo Stenson – piano
- Palle Danielsson – bass
- Jon Christensen – drums
