= Bobo Stenson =

Swedish jazz pianist

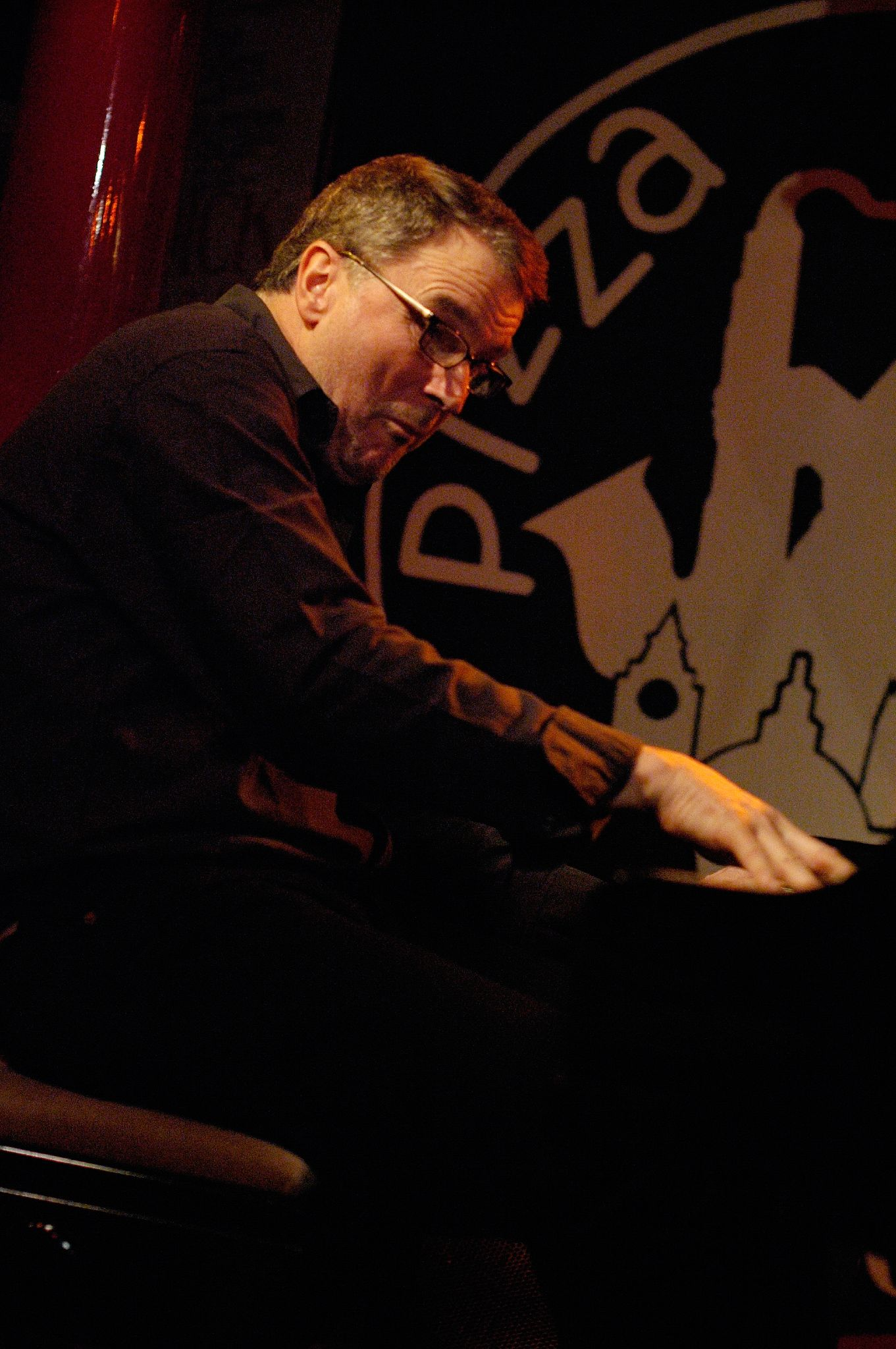
- Stenson in 2006

Background information
- Born: Bo Gustav Stenson; 4 August 1944 (age 82); Västerås, Sweden
- Genres: Jazz; classical; avant-garde
- Occupation: Musician
- Instrument: Piano
- Years active: 1960s–present
- Label: ECM
- Website: bobostenson.com

Bobo Stenson (born Bo Gustav Stenson; 4 August 1944) is a Swedish jazz pianist. The Bobo Stenson Trio, formed in collaboration with Anders Jormin (bass) and Jon Fält (drums), has been in existence for over five decades.

Bobo Stenson on stage at Stockholm Jazz Festival 2009

== Career ==
For 15 years, starting at the age of eight, Stenson studied with pianist and professor Werner Wolf Glaser, a Jewish refugee from Cologne.

In 1963, Stenson emerged from the local scene in Västerås and began playing frequently in Stockholm, where he accompanied a long line of visiting American players, including Sonny Rollins, Stan Getz and Gary Burton. He also worked closely with Don Cherry from the beginning of the trumpeter's residency in Scandinavia.

The 1970s was an intensive period for Stenson, who played in many groups, including the long-standing band Rena Rama with Palle Danielsson, and a trio with Arild Andersen and Jon Christensen. Later he played with Jan Garbarek. In 1988, Stenson joined the Charles Lloyd quartet. Since 1996 Stenson has appeared at major jazz festivals with Tomasz Stańko's septet and sextet.

== Discography ==
=== As leader ===
- Underwear (ECM, 1971)
- Witchi-Tai-To (ECM, 1973) – co-led with Jan Garbarek
- Dansere (ECM, 1975) – co-led with Jan Garbarek
- The Sounds Around the House (Caprice, 1983)
- Very Early (Dragon, 1986)
- Reflections (ECM, 1993)
- War Orphans (ECM, 1997)
- Serenity (ECM, 1999)
- Goodbye (ECM, 2005)
- Cantando (ECM, 2007)
- Indicum (ECM, 2012)
- Contra la Indecisión (ECM, 2018)
- Sphere (ECM, 2023)

=== As sideman ===
With Don Cherry

- Dona Nostra (ECM, 1993)

With Jan Garbarek

- Sart (ECM, 1971)

With Charles Lloyd

- Fish Out of Water (ECM, 1989)
- Notes from Big Sur (ECM, 1991)
- The Call (ECM, 1993)
- All My Relations (ECM, 1994)
- Canto (ECM, 1996)

With Red Mitchell

- One Long String (Mercury, 1969)

With Rena Rama

- Jazz I Sverige (Caprice, 1973)
- Landscapes (JAPO, 1977)
- Inside – Outside (Caprice, 1979)
- Live (Organic, 1983)
- New Album (Dragon, 1986)
- Rena Rama with Marilyn Mazur (Dragon, 1989)
- The Lost Tapes (Amigo, 1998) with Kenny Wheeler & Billy Hart

With George Russell

- Listen to the Silence (Soul Note, 1971)

With Terje Rypdal

- Terje Rypdal (ECM, 1971)

With Tomasz Stanko

- Bossanova and Other Ballads (Gowi, 1993)
- Matka Joanna (ECM, 1994)
- Leosia (ECM, 1996)
- Litania: Music of Krzysztof Komeda (ECM, 1997)

With Thomas Strønen

- Rica (Challenge, 2004)
- Parish (ECM, 2005)

With Others

- Agram (Moller/Willemark)
- Xieyi (Jormin)
- Change of Heart (Speake)
- Parish (Stronen)
- La Nuit de Wounded Knee (Doudou Gouirand)
