= Gina Jacobi =

Swedish singer, songwriter, and producer (born 1962)

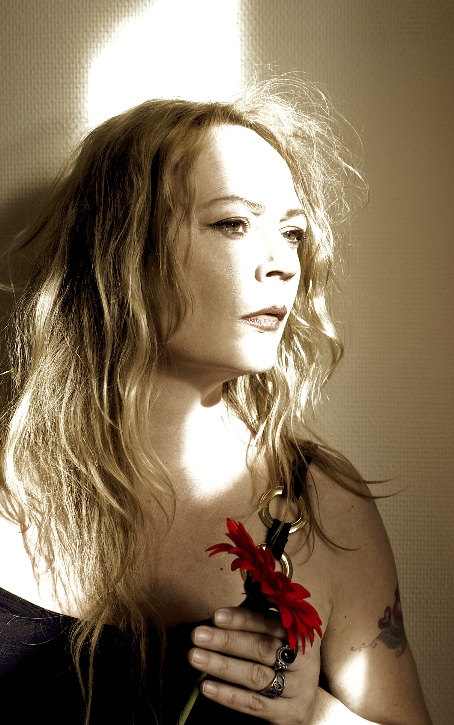
- Jacobi in 2009

Background information
- Born: Catarina Göransson; 12 December 1962 (age 63); Hammerdal, Jämtland County, Sweden
- Genres: Pop
- Occupations: Singer; songwriter; record producer
- Instruments: Vocals; keyboard; piano
- Years active: 1984-present
- Website: www.ginajacobi.se

Catarina Göransson (born 12 December 1962), known professionally as Gina Jacobi, is a Swedish singer, songwriter, and record producer. Since the mid-1980s, she has released productions on her own and other record companies, and her pop music has often been characterized by keyboard instruments, experimental songs and a huge measure of drastic humor.

In recent years, Jacobi has also served as a producer for other artists. The last album in her name was released in 2009.

== Biography ==
=== Pop career ===
Jacobi's musical career began in 1984 with the group Rummet, which released the album Bagateller on the small record company Massproduktion in the home town of Sundsvall. Then she continued in her own name, and the first solo album Tid & Rum was released in 1986.

The popularity was probably greatest in the 1990s when Jacobi in the press came to compare with music colleagues like Eva Dahlgren and Kate Bush. During these years Jacobi had a contract with Silence, Swedish Wea Metronome (Warner), Polygram and later EMI, who also released a number of her songs as singles. In connection with the album På jakt efter solen, she was nominated for a Grammis as the best female artist of the year.

=== Multicultural projects ===
Beside the music, Jacobi has run a number of different cultural projects in Västernorrland County, with or without immigrant reliance, and she also engages in painting.

In the mid-1990s, she was involved in several music projects with immigrant reliance and multilingual character. In November 1995, she was presented to an international audience, via a live recording on Kurdish satellite television, made in Brussels. Although Jacobi's knowledge of Central Kurdish was very limited, she managed to handle the chats between the songs using written pieces. In connection with this, the Sorani-language cassette edition Carê seretaye, primarily releases Jacobi's own songs, was translated to Sorani by Hassan Ghazi and S. Herish. In 1998, a new cassette edition called Jacobi's World was released in Swahili, Persian, Kurdish, Kikuyu, Swedish and Azerbaijani.

=== In English and back in Swedish ===
In the coming years, Jacobi tried to develop her writing in English, and she started several new music collaborations. This experiment eventually resulted in the two CDs Like Me (2005) and Unlike Me (2007). On both discs, Johan Wallner contributes with guitar and songwriting on a number of tracks. October 2009 came Ömtåligt gods, the first album with Swedish lyrics since 1995's "Alla är". This new record was recorded in Gina's home studio in Medjugorje Stöde and was part-financed by a number of her fans. In 2011, the single "Allt det ljus" (All the Light) was released, with the subtitle "Kim och Tomas bröllopslåt" (Kim and Tomas's wedding song). In 2012, it was reported that Jacobi worked on a new music album. Then she also worked as a teacher.

=== Jacobi as a producer ===
In her home studio, Jacobi has worked with external work for other artists, like John Daniel. From 2007 to 2010, she had a collaboration with Skåne guitarist Peter Abrahamsson, dubbed the Double Nature.

In 2008, she produced her youngest daughter Thyra Jacobi's first album. Thyra was three years old at the release of the record and the sessions were mostly performed between 2004 and 2006. Jacobi is on the album both for songwriting, trimming Thyra's joles and arrangements.

== Personal life ==
Since October 2015, Jacobi and her youngest daughter Thyra reside in Väddö, where she works as a middle school teacher. The three older daughters Millan, Elvira and Olivia Jacobi live in Stockholm and Gothenburg.

== Discography ==
=== Albums ===
- 1986 – Tid & rum
- 1988 – På jakt efter solen
- 1989 – Gå som på nålar
- 1992 – Det här är bara början
- 1995 – Alla är
- 1995 – Carê seretaye (Cassette; CD 2007)
- 1998 – Jacobi's World (Cassette)
- 2006 – Baby Star Music (Gina & Thyra Jacobi)
- 2005 – Like Me
- 2007 – Unlike Me
- 2009 – Ömtåligt gods
- 2010 – Double Nature (Duo with Peter Abrahamsson)

=== Singles ===
- Fåglar / Pandoras ask (1987)
- Svart ljus / Tid till liv (1988)
- Jag undrar / Förvirrelser (1988)
- Upp igen / Dum (1988)
- Tyst gråt / Ska jag någonsin (1989)
- Händerna på täcket / Hur kan hon (1989)
- Det faller ljus / Status noll (1989)
- Jag kommer hem / Allt du ser (1989)
- Det Svarta Ljuset / Mellan olja och blod / Mitt land (1992)
- Jag ser inte gud / Jag ser dig blunda (1995)
- Vem kan lova / Alla är II (compressed version) (1996)
- Tusen frågor (2009)
- Allt det ljus (2011)
- Mellan himmel och hemlighet (2019)
