= Xieyi (album) =

Studio album by Anders Jormin
- Released: 2001
- Recorded: December 17, 1999; October 2, 2000
- Studio: Artisten, Göteborg; Studio Bohus, Kungälv
- Genre: Jazz
- Length: 68:21
- Label: ECM; ECM 1762
- Producer: Manfred Eicher

Anders Jormin chronology
Silvae (1999)	Xieyi (2001)	In Winds, In Light (2003)

Xieyi is a solo album by Swedish jazz bassist and composer Anders Jormin recorded primarily on December 17, 1999 and released on ECM in 2001. Jormin is backed by an over-dubbed brass quartet on six tracks, recorded on October 2, 2000.

== Reception ==
Professional ratings
Review scores
Source	Rating
The Penguin Guide to Jazz Recordings	3.5/4 stars

The BBC Music review by Peter Marsh called it an "impressive and rewarding release."

== Track listing ==
All compositions by Anders Jormin except as indicated

1. "Choral" - 1:45
2. "Giv nig ej glans - Hymn 433" (Jean Sibelius) - 6:03
3. "I denna ljuva sommartid - Hymn 200" (Nathan Söderblom) - 4:51
4. "Gracias a la vida" (Violeta Parra) - 2:57
5. "Idas sommarvisa" (Georg Riedel) - 6:04
6. "Xieyi" - 0:52
7. "Decimas" - 5:34
8. "Och kanske är det natt" (Stefan Forssén) - 4:10
9. "Sul Tasto" - 1:14
10. "Tenk" - 8:43
11. "Sonett till Cornelis" (Forssén) - 5:28
12. "Romance-Distance" - 1:08
13. "Scents" - 3:02
14. "Fragancia" (Evert Taube) - 4:10
15. "Q" - 2:12
16. "War Orphans" (Ornette Coleman) - 7:51
17. "Choral" - 1:47

== Personnel ==
- Anders Jormin – bass
  - Recorded December 17, 1999 at the Artisten in Göteborg, Sweden

=== Brass quartet (tracks 1, 6, 9, 12, 15 & 17) ===
- Robin Rydqvist – trumpet, flugelhorn
- Lars-Goran Carlsson – trombone
- Nicolas Rydh – bass trombone
- Krister Petersson – French horn
  - Recorded October 2, 2000 at Studio Bohus in Kungälv, Sweden

=== Technical personnel ===
- Manfred Eicher – producer
- Johannes Lundberg – engineer
  - Mixed and edited at Studio Bunkern, Gothenburg
- Åke Linton (tracks: 1, 6, 9, 12, 15, 17) – recording engineer (brass quartet)
- Sascha Kleis – design
- Vladimir Jedlička – cover photo
- Rolf Ohlson – liner photo
- Anders Jormin – liner notes
