= Zbigniew Seifert =

Polish jazz violinist

- Born: 7 June 1946
- Origin: Kraków, Poland
- Died: 15 February 1979 (aged 32)
- Genres: Jazz
- Years active: 1970–1979
- Labels: MPS, EMI, Capitol, Mood
- Formerly of: Oregon

Zbigniew Seifert (7 June 1946 – 15 February 1979) was a Polish jazz violinist.

Seifert was born in Kraków, Poland. He played alto saxophone early in his career and was influenced by John Coltrane. He devoted himself to jazz violin when he began performing with the Tomasz Stańko Quintet in 1970, and became one of the leading modern jazz violinists. Seifert relocated to Germany in 1973, and worked with Hans Koller's Free Sound between 1974 and 1975. The following year, he performed alongside John Lewis at the Montreux Jazz Festival. Seifert later recorded with Oregon.

He died of cancer at the age of 32, and is buried at Rakowicki Cemetery in Krakow.

== Discography ==
=== Leader ===
- 1969/1970 – Nora – GAD Records (2010) (Zbigniew Seifert Quartet)
- 1976.01 – Live in Solothurn – Zbigniew Seifert Foundation (2017) (Variospheres)
- 1976.05 – Solo Violin – EMI Electrola (1978) (2017 – Zbigniew Seifert Foundation)
- 1976.09 – Man of the Light – MPS (1977) (2007 – Polonia Records)
- 1977.03 – Zbigniew Seifert – Capitol Records (1977)
- 1978.11 – Kilimanjaro – PolJazz (1979) (2006 – Anex)
- 1978.11 – Passion – Capitol Records (1979)
- 1978 – Live in Hamburg 1978 – Milo Records (2006)
- 1979 – We'll Remember Zbiggy – Mood Records (1979) (posthumos anthology with recordings from 1974 to 1978)

=== Sideman ===
- 1970.01 Tomasz Stańko, Music for K – Polskie Nagrania Muza (1970) (Tomasz Stańko Quintet)
- 1972.05 Tomasz Stańko, Jazzmessage from Poland – B.Free (1972) (Tomasz Stańko Quintet)
- 1972.06 Tomasz Stańko / Zbigniew Seifert / Michał Urbaniak / Urszula Dudziak / Roman Dyląg, We'll Remember Komeda – MPS Records / BASF (1973) (1998 – Polonia Records)
- 1972 Jiří Stivín, 5 Ran Do Cepice – Supraphon (1972)
- 1973.02 Jan "Ptaszyn" Wróblewski, Sprzedawcy Glonów – Polskie Nagrania Muza (1973)
- 1973.03 Tomasz Stańko, Purple Sun – Calig (1973) (2006 – Milo Records) (Tomasz Stańko Quintet)
- 1973.08 Volker Kriegel, Lift! – MPS / BASF (1973)
- 1973.10 Tomasz Stańko, W Pałacu Prymasowskim – PolJazz (1983) (quintet live recordings at Jazz Jamboree '73, side A )
- 1974.03 Joachim Kühn, Cinemascope – MPS / BASF (1974)
- 1974.05 Hans Koller, Kunstkopfindianer – MPS / BASF (1974) (Hans Koller Free Sound)
- 1974.05 Hans Koller, Nome – B.Free (2017) (Hans Koller Free Sound)
- 1974 Jasper van 't Hof, Eye Ball – Keytone (1974)
- 1976 Joachim Kühn, Springfever – Atlantic (1976)
- 1976 Charlie Mariano, Helen 12 Trees – MPS / BASF (1976)
- 1978 Oregon, Violin – Vanguard (1978)
- 1979 Glen Moore, Introducing – Elektra (1979)
