= Anders Jormin =

Swedish bassist and composer (born 1957)

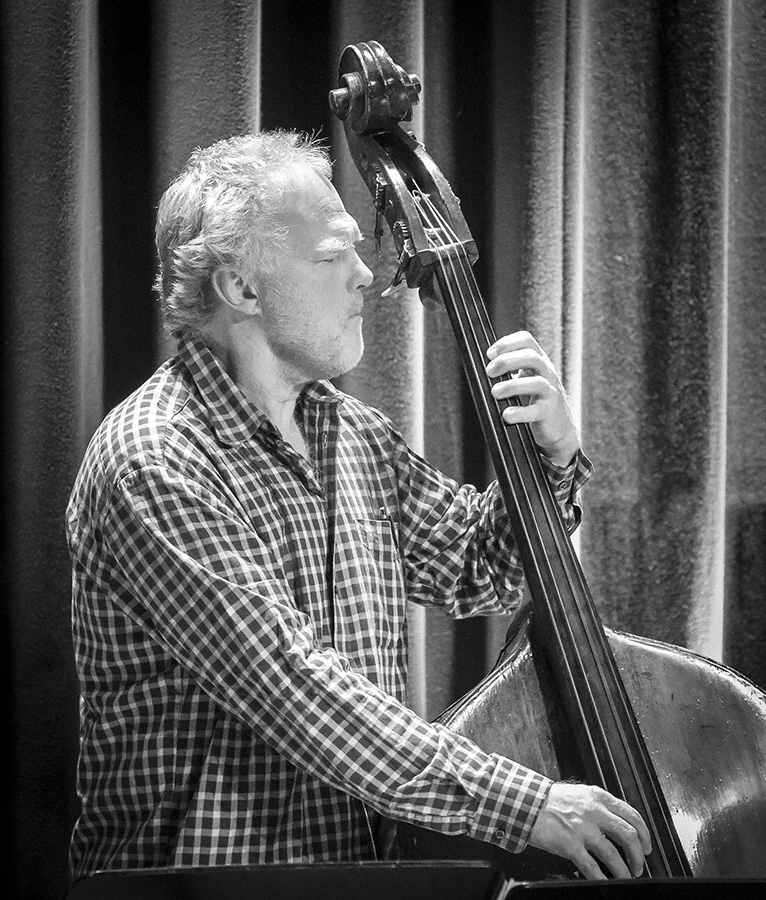
- Jormin with Sinikka Langeland at Cosmopolite, Oslo 2016

Background information
- Born: Anders Bertil Michael Jormin; 7 September 1957 (age 69); Jönköping, Sweden
- Genre: Jazz
- Occupation: Musician
- Instrument: Double bass

Anders Bertil Michael Jormin (born 7 September 1957) is a Swedish bassist and composer.

Jormin established a musical partnership with Bobo Stenson in the mid-1980s which led to international recognition playing with Charles Lloyd, in the early 1990s. In the late 1990s he also performed regularly with Polish trumpeter Tomasz Stańko.

Jorman has played and toured internationally with many musicians including Elvin Jones, Don Cherry, Lee Konitz, Joe Henderson, Paul Motian, Rita Marcotulli, Norma Winstone, Mike Mainieri, Mats Gustafsson, Albert Mangelsdorff, Dino Saluzzi, Marilyn Crispell, and Kenny Wheeler.

Anders Jormin also teaches double bass and improvisation and holds a Professorial post at the Academy of Music and Drama at University of Gothenburg since 2002. In 1995 he undertook a visiting professorship at the Sibelius Academy in Helsinki. The same appointed him Doctor honores causa (honorary doctorate) in 2003.

== Background ==
Anders Jormin grew up in a musical family with a father who was a professional pop musician and learned to perform jazz standards at an early age, he studied classical music on piano and bass at the University of Gothenburg and has a long-standing appreciation of folk music and combines classical music with folk and jazz in his compositional approach. Anders Jormin’s brother is the percussionist and pianist Christian Jormin.

== Awards and honors ==
Jormin has received the Jan Johansson Scholarship (1992), Jazz Kannan (1994), and a Swedish Grammy for Best Jazz Album with the Bobo Stenson Trio, Reflections (1996). In November 2010 he was awarded the Swedish Royal Music Academy Jazz Prize.

Anders Jormin and Job Fält - the rhythm section of the Bobo Stenson Trio on stage in Warsaw, Poland (2009).

== Discography ==
=== As leader ===
- Nordic Lights (Dragon, 1984)
- Eight Pieces (Dragon)
- Alone (Dragon, 1991)
- Jord (Dragon, 1995)
- Once (Dragon, 1997)
- Silvae (Dragon, 1998)
- Xieyi (ECM, 2001)
- In Winds, In Light (ECM, 2003)
- Aviaja (Footprint, 2005)
- Songs in Meantone (Footprint, 2011)
- Ad Lucem (ECM, 2012)
- Provenance (Footprint, 2013)
- Between Always and Never (Swedish Society Discofil, 2014)
- Trees of Light with Lena Willemark and Karin Nakagawa (ECM, 2015)

=== As sideman ===
With Don Cherry

- Dona Nostra (ECM, 1994)

With Marilyn Crispell

- Spring Tour (Alice Musik Produktion, 1995)

With Mark Feldman

- What Exit (ECM, 2006)

With Charles Lloyd

- Notes from Big Sur (ECM, 1992)
- The Call (ECM, 1993)
- All My Relations (ECM, 1994)
- Canto (ECM, 1996)

With Tomasz Stańko

- Matka Joanna (ECM, 1994)
- Leosia (ECM, 1996)
- From the Green Hill (ECM, 1998)

With Bobo Stenson

- Very Early (Dragon)
- Reflections (ECM, 1993)
- War Orphans (ECM, 1997)
- Serenity (ECM, 1999)
- Goodbye (ECM, 2004)
- Cantando (ECM, 2007)
- Indicum (ECM, 2011)
- Contra la Indecisión (ECM, 2018)

With Kenny Wheeler

- It Takes Two ! (C.A.M. Jazz – CAMJ 7786-2, 2006)
