= Electronic Sonata for Souls Loved by Nature =

Studio album by George Russell
- Released: 1971; 1980
- Recorded: April 29, 1969 (1968 Version); June 9 & 10 1980 (1980 Version)
- Genre: Avant-garde jazz
- Length: 51:49 (1968 Version); 48:13 (1980 Version)
- Label: Flying Dutchman Records; Strata-East Records; Soul Note

George Russell chronology
George Russell Sextet at Beethoven Hall (1965); New York Big Band (1982)	Electronic Sonata for Souls Loved by Nature (1971)	Trip to Prillarguri (1970); Live in an American Time Spiral (1983)

1970 Sonet Recording

1980 Soul Note Recording

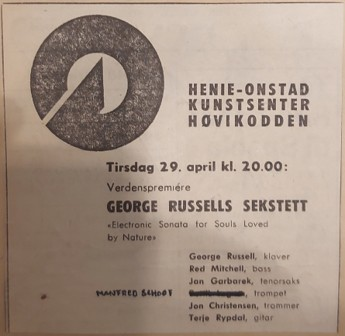
Henie Onstad Art Center April 1969 advertisement for the original concert: Tuesday April 29, 1969 / World premiere. Swedish trumpeter Bertil Lövgren was replaced on short notice by Manfred Schoof.

Professional ratings
Review scores
Source	Rating
Allmusic	5/5 stars
The Rolling Stone Jazz Record Guide	4/5 stars
The Penguin Guide to Jazz Recordings	3/4 stars

Electronic Sonata for Souls Loved by Nature is a composed work, originally in fourteen movements—or events as they are denoted by the composer—written by jazz arranger George Russell in the 1960 decade, using new compositional techniques associated at the time with contemporary music. It was performed April 29, 1969 during a concert at the Henie Onstad Kunstsenter, a recording of which was released in 1971. The composition is "... meant to suggest that man, in the face of encroaching technology, must confront technology and attempt to humanize it, using it to enrich his collective soul…not only his purse… to explore inner, as well as outer space".

The earliest version of the suite is from the year 1966, consisting of three parts, and was issued in 1971 under The Essence of George Russell album. Later on 2010, it was included in the cd box "The Complete Remastered Recordings On Black Saint & Soul Note" disc number 8.

The music is structured around a panstylistic tape of "fragments of many different styles of, avantgarde jazz music, ragas, blues, rock, serial music etc. treated electronically, ... a palate upon which non-electronical musical statements of a panstylistic nature could be projected". Musicologist and jazz critic Max Harrison writes, "it is no mere coincidence that one is reminded of Stockhausen's Telemusik of 1966". The tape had been recorded at EMS (Elektronmusikstudion) in Stockholm and consisted of a collage of sound fragments obtained from various types of music and from various places in the world. He mixed music that was seemingly incompatible both in terms of sound and context. A kind of world music with styles that rub up against each other.

The work was commissioned by Sveriges Radio and first performed with a sextet in a concert at the Henie Onstad Kunstsenter, outside Oslo, on April 29, 1969. A recording of this performance was released in 1971 on the Flying Dutchman label with the year of composition, 1968, in the title. This release featured Russell with Jan Garbarek, Manfred Schoof, Terje Rypdal, Jon Christensen, and Red Mitchell and was subsequently re-released on Strata-East Records on LP in 1976, and again on the Italian Soul Note label in 1985 (LP and CD).

Russell has revisited the piece twice on record. For a performance of the work in 1970 he added one more event to a total of fifteen. This time he rearranged and recorded the composition with a large orchestra in Stockholm. It was recorded on October 6, 1970. The 1970-recording was released on the Sonet label as part of the album "The Essence of George Russell" in 1971, and rereleased in 1983 on the Black Lion label. In 1980 George Russell rerecorded the sextet version with Jean-François Jenny-Clark, Victor Comer, Keith Copeland, Robert Moore and Lew Soloff. This time the original 1968 in the title was evidently interpreted as the performance year, and the title of the 1980-recording was extended with its recording year. It was released on Soul Note as an LP in 1980 and CD in 1985.

== Track listing ==
1969 version

1. "Events 1-2-3-4-5-6-7" - 25:36
2. "Events 8-9-10-11-12-13-14" - 26:13

1966 version

1. "Part I" - 19:51
2. "Part II" - 19:42
3. "Part III" - 20:53

1980 version

1. "Events 1-2-3-4-5-6-7" - 23:45
2. "Events 8-9-10-11-12-13-14" - 24:28

== Personnel ==
=== 1966 recording ===
- Jan Allan, Maffy Falay, Bertil Lövgren, Lars Samuelsson: trumpet
- Arne Domnérus: alto saxophone
- Claes Rosendahl: soprano, alto and tenor saxophone, flute
- Lennart Åberg: soprano and tenor saxophone, flute
- Erik Nilsson: baritone saxophone, bass clarinet
- Olle Lind: bass trombone
- Berndt Egerbladh: vibraphone, xylophone
- Bengt Hallberg: piano
- Rune Gustafsson: guitar
- Georg Riedel: bass
- Egil Johansen: drums
- Sabu Martinez: congas
- George Russell: piano, conductor
- Stanton Davis: trumpet, flugelhorn
- Jan Garbarek: tenor saxophone
- Terje Rypdal: electric guitar
- Arild Andersen: bass
- Jon Christensen: drums

Recorded in Stockholm, 1966

=== 1969 recording ===
- Jan Garbarek: tenor saxophone
- Manfred Schoof: trumpet
- Terje Rypdal: electric guitar
- Jon Christensen: drums
- Red Mitchell: bass
- George Russell: piano

Recorded live at the Sonja Henie/Niels Onstad Kunstsenter Oslo, April 29, 1969

=== 1980 recording ===
- Jean-François Jenny-Clark: bass
- Victor Comer: guitar
- Keith Copeland: percussion
- Robert Moore: saxophones
- Lew Soloff: trumpet
- George Russell: piano, organ

Recorded June 9 & 10, 1980 at Barigozzi Studio, Milan
