= George Russell Sextet Live in Breman and Paris 1964 =

George Russell Sextet Live in Bremen and Paris 1964

Live album by George Russell & The Living Time Orchestra
- Released: 2008
- Genre: Jazz
- Label: Gambit Spain
- Producer: George Russell

George Russell chronology
The Outer View (1962)	George Russell Sextet Live in Bremen and Paris 1964 (2008)	George Russell Sextet at Beethoven Hall (1965)

George Russell Sextet Live in Bremen and Paris 1964 is an album featuring the George Russell sextet recorded "live" at concerts in Salle Pleyel in Paris, France, and in Bremen, Germany, in 1964. The record comprises eight extended pieces, of which four are Russell originals. The remaining songs are composed by Miles Davis and Thelonious Monk. The CD also contains two interesting versions of Russell's '"D.C. Divertimento'". Trumpeter Thad Jones is also featured on the album. The album was recorded under the label Gambit Spain.

== Tracks ==
1. "Round Midnight" (Thelonious Monk)
2. "You Are My Sunshine"
3. "D.C. Divertimento"
4. "Sippin' at Bells"
5. "The Outer View"
6. "Volupté"
7. "You Are My Sunshine"
8. "D.C. Divertimento"
