= Dave Bargeron =

American trombonist and tuba player (1942–2025)

- Born: September 6, 1942; Athol, Massachusetts, U.S.
- Died: January 18, 2025 (aged 82)
- Genres: Jazz, jazz rock
- Instruments: Trombone, tuba

David Wayne Bargeron (September 6, 1942 – January 18, 2025) was an American trombonist and tuba player who was a member of the jazz-rock group Blood, Sweat & Tears.

== Life and career ==
Bargeron was born on September 6, 1942. He was lead trombonist with Clark Terry's Big Band and played bass trombone and tuba with Doc Severinsen's Band between 1968 and 1970. He joined Blood, Sweat, and Tears in 1970 after Jerry Hyman departed and first appeared on the album B, S & T; 4. With this group, he recorded the jazz-rock solo on the tuba in "And When I Die/One Room Country Shack" on the album Live and Improvised. His recording credits with BS&T include eleven albums. A break in their schedule allowed him to join the Gil Evans Orchestra in 1972.

He became a freelance musician after leaving Blood, Sweat & Tears. He recorded with Billy Joel, Paul Simon, Mick Jagger, James Taylor, Eric Clapton, David Sanborn, Carla Bley, and Pat Metheny. He performed with the George Gruntz Concert Jazz Band from Switzerland, the George Russell Living Time Orchestra, and was a long-time member of Jaco Pastorius's Word of Mouth Band. He recorded and toured with Tuba Tuba, a jazz tuba band which includes Michel Godard, Luciano Biondini, and Kenwood Dennard. He was a member of Howard Johnson's Gravity, a six-tuba group that has been together since 1968. Bargeron released several albums as a soloist and in collaboration.

Bargeron died on January 18, 2025, at the age of 82. He was survived by his wife of 39 years, Holly, and their child Augusta; Three children he had with his late first wife Sandra: Julianna, David, and Sojourner; His siblings, Richard Bargeron and Deborah Kuzmeskas; and his beloved grandchildren. David was predeceased by his son Jeremiah Howard Bargeron, who died in 1977 at the age of 5.

== Discography ==
=== As leader ===
- Barge Burns...Slide Flies (Mapleshade, 1995)
- Tuba Tuba (Enja, 2001)

=== As sideman ===
With Blood, Sweat & Tears

- B, S & T; 4 (Columbia, 1971)
- New Blood (Columbia, 1972)
- No Sweat (Columbia, 1973)
- Mirror Image (Columbia, 1974)
- New City (Columbia, 1975)
- In Concert (CBS, 1976)
- More Than Ever (Columbia, 1976)
- Brand New Day (ABC, 1977)

With Gil Evans

- Live at the Public Theater (New York 1980) (Trio, 1981)
- Bud and Bird (Electric Bird, 1987)
- Farewell (Electric Bird, 1988)

With George Gruntz

- Theatre (ECM, 1984)
- First Prize (Enja, 1989)
- Blues 'N Dues Et Cetera (Enja, 1991)
- Beyond Another Wall (TCB, 1994)
- Liebermann Live at Jazz Fest Berlin (TCB, 1999)
- Merryteria (TCB, 1999)
- Expo Triangle (MGB, 2000)
- Global Excellence (TCB, 2001)
- Tiger by the Tail (TCB, 2006)
- Pourquoi Pas? Why Not? (TCB, 2008)
- Matterhorn Matters (MGB, 2010)
- News Reel Matters (MGB, 2013)

With Howard Johnson

- Gravity!!! (Verve/Motor Music, 1996)
- Right Now! (Verve/Motor Music, 1997)
- Testimony (Tuscarora, 2017)

With Bob Mintzer

- Papa Lips (CBS/Sony, 1983)
- Incredible Journey (DMP, 1985)
- Spectrum (DMP, 1988)
- Urban Contours (DMP, 1989)
- Art of the Big Band (DMP, 1991)
- Departure (DMP, 1993)
- Live at the Berlin Jazz Festival (Basic, 1996)

With Jaco Pastorius

- Word of Mouth (Warner Bros., 1981)
- Twins I Aurex Jazz Festival '82 (Warner Bros., 1982)
- Twins II Aurex Jazz Festival '82 (Warner Bros., 1982)
- Invitation (Warner Bros., 1983)
- The Birthday Concert (Warner Bros., 1995)
- Twins I & II: Live in Japan 1982 (Warner Bros., 1999)
- Then & Now (Rhino/Warner, 2016)
- Truth, Liberty & Soul (Resonance, 2017)

With Steve Tyrell

- This Guy's in Love (Columbia, 2003)
- The Disney Standards (Walt Disney, 2006)
- Back to Bacharach (Koch, 2008)

With others

- Rabih Abou-Khalil, The Cactus of Knowledge (Enja, 2001)
- Ray Anderson, Big Band Record (Gramavision, 1994)
- Ashford & Simpson, A Musical Affair (Warner Bros., 1980)
- B. B. & Q. Band, All Night Long (Capitol, 1982)
- Bananarama, Please Yourself (London, 1993)
- Carla Bley, Looking for America (WATT Works/ECM, 2003)
- Randy Brecker, Into the Sun (Sweeca, 1996)
- Jonatha Brooke, My Mother Has 4 Noses (Bad Dog, 2014)
- Hiram Bullock, Give It What U Got (1987)
- Michel Camilo, One More Once (Columbia, 1994)
- Michel Camilo, Caribe (Calle 54, 2009)
- Tom Chapin, Zag Zig (Sony Wonder 1994)
- Kristin Chenoweth, Let Yourself Go (Sony Classical, 2001)
- Eric Clapton, August (Warner Bros., 1986)
- David Clayton-Thomas, David Clayton-Thomas (Columbia, 1972)
- Joe Cocker, Civilized Man (Capitol, 1984)
- Miles Davis & Quincy Jones, Live at Montreux (Warner Bros., 1993)
- Charles Earland, Coming to You Live (Columbia, 1980)
- Charles Earland, Earland's Street Themes (Columbia, 2012)
- Peter Erskine, Motion Poet (Denon, 1988)
- Aydin Esen, Anadolu (Columbia, 1992)
- Bill Evans-George Russell Orchestra, Living Time (Columbia, 1972)
- Donald Fagen, The Nightfly (Warner Bros., 1982)
- Thomas Fersen, Le Jour Du Poisson (Tot Ou Tard 1997)
- Michael Franks, Skin Dive (Warner Bros, 1985)
- Michael Gibbs, Big Music (Venture, 1988)
- Michael Gibbs, Nonsequence (Provocateur, 2001)
- Johnny Griffin, Dance of Passion (Antilles, 1993)
- Carol Hall, If I Be Your Lady (Elektra, 1971)
- Terumasa Hino, City Connection (Flying Disk 1979)
- James Ingram, Never Felt So Good (Qwest, 1986)
- Paul Jabara, De La Noche: The True Story (Warner Bros., 1986)
- Bob James, Three (CTI, 1976)
- Bob James, Touchdown (Tappan Zee/Columbia, 1978)
- Billy Joel, The Bridge (Columbia, 1986)
- Chaka Khan, Naughty (Warner Bros., 1980)
- Toshinobu Kubota, Neptune (Sony 1992)
- Pete Levin, Party in the Basement (Gramavision, 1990)
- Lyle Mays, Street Dreams (Geffen, 1988)
- Susan McKeown, Bushes & Briars (Alula 1998)
- Pat Metheny, Secret Story (Geffen, 1992)
- Othello Molineaux, It's About Time (Big World Music, 1993)
- Michael Bolton, All That Matters (1997)
- James Moody, Young at Heart (Warner Bros., 1996)
- Max Morath, A Tribute to Bert Williams (Vanguard, 1976)
- Gerry Mulligan, Re-birth of the Cool (GRP, 1992)
- Aaron Neville, Nature Boy: The Standards Album (Verve, 2003)
- Claude Nougaro, Nougayork (WEA, 1987)
- Robert Palmer, Ridin' High (EMI 1992)
- Lenny Pickett, Lenny Pickett with the Borneo Horns (Carthage, 1987)
- Natalie Cole, Snowfall on the Sahara (1999)
- Sheryl Lee Ralph, In the Evening (New York Music Co., 1984)
- Raw Stylus, Pushing Against the Flow (Geffen, Giant Step 1995)
- The Roches, A Dove (MCA, 1992)
- George Russell, It's About Time 1996 (Label Bleu, 2016)
- George Russell, The 80th Birthday Concert (Concept Publishing, 2005)
- Philippe Saisse, Halfway 'Til Dawn (GRP, 1999)
- Henri Salvador, Monsieur Henri (TriStar Music 1994)
- Mark Sholtez, Real Street (Universal/Verve, 2006)
- Paul Simon, Graceland (Warner Bros, 1986)
- Paul Simon, The Rhythm of the Saints (Warner Bros., 1990)
- Phoebe Snow, Something Real (Elektra, 1989)
- Livingston Taylor, Bicycle (1996)
- Spyro Gyra, City Kids (MCA, 1983)
- Candi Staton, Candi Staton (Warner Bros., 1980)
- James Taylor, New Moon Shine (Columbia, 1991)
- B. J. Thomas, Longhorns & Londonbridges (Paramount, 1974)
- Teri Thornton, I'll Be Easy to Find (Verve, 1999)
- Luther Vandross, Forever, for Always, for Love (Epic, 1982)
- Paul Whiteman, Maurice Peress, Ivan Davis, Dick Hyman, The Birth of Rhapsody in Blue (Musical Heritage Society, 1987)
- Ernie Wilkins, Hard Mother Blues (Mainstream, 1970)
- Ernie Wilkins, Screaming Mothers (Mainstream, 1974)
- Larry Willis, Inner Crisis (Groove Merchant, 1973)
