= So What (George Russell album) =

Live album by George Russell & The Living Time Orchestra
- Released: 1987
- Recorded: June 18, 1983
- Genre: Jazz
- Length: 38:49
- Label: Blue Note
- Producer: George Russell

George Russell chronology
| The African Game (1984) | So What (1987) | New York (1988) |

Professional ratings
Review scores
| Source | Rating |
|---|---|
| Allmusic | 3/5 stars |

So What is a live album by George Russell released on the Blue Note label in 1987, featuring performances by Russell with his Living Time Orchestra recorded in 1983 in Boston.

== Reception ==
The Allmusic review by Richard S. Ginell awarded the album 3 stars and states "These tracks were recorded at the same Boston church concert that yielded The African Game, and Russell's Living Time Orchestra responds with the same kick and enthusiasm, although the musicians' individual solo turns aren't terribly startling... further evidence of Russell's (mixed?) desire to come to terms with the idioms of his time".

== Track listing ==
All compositions by George Russell except as indicated

1. "So What" (Miles Davis) - 7:57
2. "Rhymes" (Carla Bley) - 6:27
3. "War Gewesen" (David Baker) - 5:13
4. "Time Spiral" - 19:23

- Recorded live at Emmanuel Church, Boston, Massachusetts, June 18, 1983.

== Personnel ==
- George Russell - conductor, arranger
- Marc Rossi - keyboards
- Gary Joynes - tenor saxophone, soprano saxophone, flute
- Janis Steprans - alto saxophone, soprano saxophone, flute
- Mark Hervey - trumpet
- Chip Kaner - trombone
- Mark White - guitar
- Bill Urmson - fender bass
- Keith Copeland - drums
- Bruce Barth - keyboards (tracks 1 & 2)
- George Garzone - tenor saxophone, soprano saxophone (tracks 1 & 2)
- Dave Mann - alto saxophone, soprano saxophone, flute (tracks 1 & 2)
- Brad Jones - baritone saxophone, bass clarinet, flute (tracks 1 & 2)
- Mike Peipman, Chris Passin, Roy Okutani - trumpet (tracks 1 & 2)
- Peter Cirelli - trombone (tracks 1 & 2)
- Jeff Marsanskas - bass trombone (tracks 1 & 2)
- Marshall Sealy - french horn (tracks 1 & 2)
- Bob Nieske - acoustic bass (tracks 1 & 2)
- Dave Hagedorn - percussion (tracks 1 & 2)
- Joe Galeota - congas (tracks 1 & 2)
