= Serious Fun =

Serious Fun may refer to:

- Serious Fun, a 1987 album by The Firm
- Serious Fun (Lester Bowie album), 1989
- Serious Fun (George Gruntz album), 1990
- Serious Fun (The Knack album), 1991
- SeriousFun Children's Network, a global network of children's camps and programs
