= Markus Hauser =

Swiss music educator

Markus Hauser (born November 30, 1971, Näfels) is a Swiss musician (alto, soprano, tenor, baritone saxophonist, clarinet, transverse flute), band leader, composer and music teacher.

== Life and works ==
Originally from Glarus, Hauser embarked on his musical career at the age of 15 as a saxophonist. After two years at the St. Gallen jazz school, he studied at Berklee College of Music in Boston and graduated in 1993 with a major in performance. He spent further years studying with Kenny Garrett, Joe Viola, Hal Crook, George Garzone and Jerry Bergonzi. Furnished with a scholarship, he continued training at New York's Manhattan School of Music, where he refined his repertoire and became a professional musician. In 2011 he once again spent time studying abroad, in Brazilian Salvador da Bahia. His dealings with South American idioms and jazz improvisations influence his earliest compositions.

As a band leader, Hauser not only realised his own projects, he was also the "side man" in a variety of formations and ensembles. As such he toured with the Swiss big band leader Pepe Lienhard, with Udo Jürgens, with Brand New Rhythm in Mexico and Europe, and with the Phil Dankner Seat Music Session in Switzerland. Of his projects as band leader, both Vol. I and II of "Boleros y Tangos", "There’s a Way out", "No Joke", "NuTube" and "A Tribute to Art Pepper" count among his most outstanding creations. Art Pepper, the American alto saxophonist, is one of his idols. Pepper's ability to recount fascinating stories with simple melodies impressed him. Hauser transcribed and arranged compositions of the alto saxophonist. "A Tribute to Art Pepper" is both an impression of his intellectual creativity as well as his musical brilliance.

A further project is "NuTube", presented by Hauser and Loris and Paolo Peloso. NuTube is a form of Nu Jazz, which came into being in the mid-1990s in countries including the US, Mexico, France and Brazil. Hauser takes social trends of this style – as are expressed for example in Herbie Hancock’s Future Shock or by France's St. Germain – and develops his own musical concept from these. NuTube combines electronic music such as chill out and house with live instrumental music and is characterised by its polyvalent style, rhythm and formations.

In addition to his work as a freelance musician, he is also a lecturer and examiner at universities and provides private tuition.

== Style ==
Shaped by jazz from the 1940s and 50s (incl. Charlie Parker, John Coltrane, Art Pepper) as well as his time spent studying with Kenny Garrett, George Garzone and Jerry Bergonzi, one of his strong stylistic anchors is embedded in hard bop jazz. His own compositions and solos have gained stylistic expansion through his time spent studying and on concert tours in Europe and South America. The incorporation and modulation of South American styles is apparent in compositions and arrangements such as both Vol. "Boleros y Tangos".

"Hauser's pieces are sensitively and finely composed and arranged". The artistic identity of Hauser (in addition to his native German, he also speaks English, Spanish and Portuguese) can be described as polystylistic and cosmopolitan. He moves between jazz (swing, be bop, hard bop), South American music and funk, pop and rock. His music is on the one hand lively and full of energy, whilst also being sensitive, charged with emotion and an expression of a true passion for the transcendent.

== «hausertone» ==
Hauser developed new mouthpieces for saxophones. During his time spent studying in the US, the trained toolmaker embarked on research and literature studies in order to develop his own mouthpieces. Together with his brother he has been producing individual pieces aimed at the requirements of saxophonists since 2004. Since 2007, in addition to saxophonists in Europe, musicians such as Kenny Garrett and Chico Freeman have also been playing with "hausertone" mouthpieces.

== Prizes, accolades and endorsements ==
Accolades and prizes

- 1993 Scholarship from the canton of Glarus
- 1999 Cultural award from the canton of Solothurn
- 2006 Cultural award from Mexico
- 2011 Cultural award from the canton of Aargau

Endorsements

- 2003, 2010-2014 endorsed by Selmer Saxophone, Switzerland
- 2008 endorsed by Yamaha Saxophones
- 2010 endorsed by Ford Automobile
- 2012-2014 endorsed by AMAG VW Automobile, Switzerland
- 2013/2014 endorsed by Poloshirts AD.M., Switzerland

== Discography ==
- There is a Way out. 1994. Mit Franco Ambrosetti (tb), Fritz Renold (sax), Pat Tucker (ts), Mark Soskin (p), Harvie Swartz (b), Adam Nussbaum (dr).
- No Joke. 1997. Mit Michel Kunz (g), Richard Hammond (b), Ethan Eubanks (dr),
- Tango y Bolero 2000 Vol. 1 2000 mit Heriberto „Heri“ Paredes (p), Loris Peloso (g), Markus Fischer (b), Andi Lüscher (dr)
- Very simple 2001 mit Christian Baader,
- Milonga del Angel. Vol. 2, 2002. Mit Heriberto „Heri“ Paredes (p), Loris Peloso (g), Markus Fischer (b), Georgios Mikirozis (perc), Andi Lüscher (dr),
- World. 2005.
- NuTube. 2006. Loris Peloso und Paolo Peloso.
- A Tribute to Art Pepper. Live, 2006. Mit Christian Lohr (p), Loris Peloso (g), Fabian Gisler (b) und Pius Baschnagel (dr).

== Bibliography ==
- Limmattalerzeitung (23. Dezember 2012)
- Eine Detonation aus Energie und Dynamik – Die New Yorker Deepfunkband «Brand New Rhythm» gastiert auf dem Schloss. In: Aargauer Zeitung vom 6. Juni 2005.
- The Return of Mark Hauser. In: Jazz’n’More, 05/2004
- Programm Oltner Jazztage. Markus Hauser – «Tribute to Art Pepper». (19. September 2004) (PDF; 34 kB)
- Neue CD mit zügigem Drive, Funkology gastierte in Olten. In: Solothurner Zeitung (April 1997)
