= New York Big Band =

Live album by George Russell
- Released: 1982
- Recorded: March 10, 1977 & August 16, 1978
- Genre: Jazz
- Length: 50:24
- Label: Soul Note
- Producer: George Russell

George Russell chronology
Vertical Form VI (1981)	New York Big Band (1982)	Electronic Sonata for Souls Loved by Nature - 1980 (1980)

Professional ratings
Review scores
Source	Rating
Allmusic	4.5/5 stars
The Rolling Stone Jazz Record Guide	4/5 stars
The Penguin Guide to Jazz Recordings	3.5/4 stars

New York Big Band is a live album by George Russell released on the Italian Soul Note label in 1982, featuring performances by Russell with his New York Big Band recorded in 1978 and one track with The Swedish Radio Jazz Orchestra recorded in 1977 at the same concert that produced Vertical Form VI.

== Reception ==
The Allmusic review awarded the album 4½ stars.

== Track listing ==
All compositions by George Russell except as indicated

1. "Living Time: Event V" – 10:47
2. "Big City Blues" – 9:22
3. "Listen to the Silence Part 1" – 4:32
4. "Cubano Be, Cubano Bop" (Dizzy Gillespie, Russell) – 10:25
5. "Mystic Voices" (Stanton Davis) – 5:56
6. "God Bless the Child" (Arthur Herzog Jr., Billie Holiday) – 5:25
7. "Listen to the Silence Part 2" – 3:57

- Recorded in Estrad, Sodertalje, Sweden on March 10, 1977 (track 4) and New York City on August 16, 1978 (tracks 1–3 & 5–7).

== Personnel ==
- George Russell – conductor, arranger
- Stanley Cowell – piano (track 1)
- Goetz Tangerding – piano (tracks 2–3 & 5–7)
- Ricky Martinez – electric piano, organ
- Warren Smith – drums (tracks 1–3 & 5–7)
- Cameron Brown – bass (tracks 1–3 & 5–7)
- Mark Slifstein – guitar (tracks 1–3 & 5–7)
- Babafumi Akunyon – congas (tracks 1–3 & 5–7)
- Stanton Davis, Terumasa Hino – trumpet (tracks 1–3 & 5–7)
- Lew Soloff – trumpet, flugelhorn (tracks 1–3 & 5–7)
- John Clark – French horn (tracks 1–3 & 5–7)
- Gary Valente – trombone (tracks 1–3 & 5–7)
- Dave Taylor – bass trombone (tracks 1–3 & 5–7)
- Ricky Ford, Roger Rosenberg – tenor saxophone (tracks 1–3 & 5–7)
- Marty Ehrlich – alto saxophone (tracks 1–3 & 5–7)
- Carl Atkins – baritone saxophone, bass clarinet (tracks 1–3 & 5–7)
- Lee Genesis – vocals (track 2)
- Vlodek Gulgowski – piano, electric piano (track 4)
- Lars Beijbon – drums (track 4)
- Sabu Martinez – congas, vocals (track 4)
- Lars-Urban Helje – bass (track 4)
- Rune Gustafsson – guitar (track 4)
- Americo Bellotto, Bertil Lövgren, Håken Nyquist, Jan Allan – trumpet (track 4)
- Lars Olofsson, Bengt Edvarsson, Jörgen Johansson – trombone (track 4)
- Sven Larsson – bass trombone (track 4)
- Arne Domnerus, Ian Uling – alto saxophone (track 4)
- Lennart Åberg, Bernt Rosengren – tenor saxophone (track 4)
- Erik Nilsson – baritone saxophone
