= Vertical Form VI =

Live album by George Russell
- Released: 1981
- Recorded: March 10, 1977
- Genre: Jazz
- Length: 40:44
- Label: Soul Note
- Producer: George Russell

George Russell chronology
Living Time (1972)	Vertical Form VI (1981)	New York Big Band (1982)

Professional ratings
Review scores
Source	Rating
Allmusic	4/5 stars
The Rolling Stone Jazz Record Guide	5/5 stars

Vertical Form VI is a live album by George Russell recorded in 1977 and released on the Italian Soul Note label in 1981, featuring a performance by the Swedish Radio Jazz Orchestra.

== Reception ==
The Allmusic review by Ron Wynn awarded the album four stars and states "This is a magnificent and critically acclaimed large band recording with the Swedish Radio Jazz Orchestra playing compositions and arrangements by George Russell, who also conducted. His music, with its intricate, unpredictable, and keenly structured pace, textures, and layers, are expertly played". The Rolling Stone Jazz Record Guide gave it five stars and called it "a live orchestral recording that captures Russell's innovative orchestration techniques in a stunning extended work".

== Track listing ==
All compositions by George Russell

1. "Event I" - 9:07
2. "Event II" - 15:03
3. "Event III" - 4:36
4. "Event IV" - 9:24
5. "Event V" - 1:59

- Recorded in Estrad, Sodertalje, Sweden.

== Personnel ==
- Carl Atkins - Principal Conductor
- George Russell - Composer, Assistant Conductor
- Arne Domnérus - soprano saxophone, alto saxophone, clarinet
- Ian Uling - tenor saxophone, alto saxophone, flute
- Lennart Åberg, Bernet Rosengren - tenor saxophone, alto saxophone, soprano saxophone, flute
- Erik Nilsson - baritone saxophone, bass clarinet, flute
- Americo Bellotto, Bertil Lövgren - trumpet, flugelhorn
- Håken Nyquist - trumpet, flugelhorn, french horn
- Jan Allan - trumpet, french horn
- Ivar Olsen - french horn
- Lars Olofsson, Bengt Edvarsson, Jörgen Johansson - trombone
- Sven Larsson - bass trombone, tuba
- Rune Gustafsson - guitar
- Stefan Brolund - electric bass
- Bronislav Suchanek, Lars-Urban Helje - acoustic bass
- Björn Lind - electric piano
- Vlodek Gulgowski - synthesizer, electric piano
- Monica Dominique - celeste, organ, electric piano, clavinet
- Lars Beijbon, Leroy Lowe - drums
- Sabu Martinez - congas
