= The Essence of George Russell =

Studio album by George Russell
- Released: 1971
- Recorded: 1966–1967
- Genre: Jazz
- Length: 85:03
- Label: Sonet, Black Saint
- Producer: George Russell

George Russell chronology
Othello Ballet Suite/Electronic Organ Sonata No. 1 (1970)	The Essence of George Russell (1971)	Electronic Sonata for Souls Loved by Nature (1971)

Professional ratings
Review scores
Source	Rating
Allmusic	3.5/5 stars
The Rolling Stone Jazz Record Guide	5/5 stars
The Penguin Guide to Jazz Recordings	3.5/4 stars

The Essence of George Russell is an album by American jazz composer and pianist George Russell originally released on the Swedish Sonet label in 1971, and subsequently reissued on the Italian Black Saint label in 1983. The album featuring performances by Russell with a large ensemble, mostly Nordic musicians, including Stanton Davis, Jan Garbarek, Terje Rypdal, Arild Andersen, Jon Christensen and orchestra.

== Reception ==
The Allmusic review by Brian Olewnick states: "The Essence Of... contained George Russell's first large-scale work to incorporate electronic elements from contemporary classical music as well as an emerging influence of modern rock. "Electronic Sonata for Souls Loved by Nature" is a massive work... the composition progresses from theme to theme, many of them propulsive and groove-oriented, serving as platforms for improvisations from the featured players... "Now and Then," recorded a couple of years prior to the other pieces, is more along the lines of Russell's previous work, especially as heard on his At Beethoven Hall recording: good, rambunctious big band jazz. On the whole, highly recommended".

== Track listing ==
All compositions by George Russell

1. "Electric Sonata for Souls Loved by Nature - Part I" - 19:45
2. "Electric Sonata for Souls Loved by Nature - Part II" - 19:51
3. "Electric Sonata for Souls Loved by Nature - Part III" - 20:53
4. "Concerto For Self-Accompanied Guitar" - 9:25
5. "Now and Then" - 14:07

- Recorded in Stockholm, Sweden 1966 & 1967.

== Personnel ==
- George Russell - piano, conductor
- Jan Garbarek - tenor saxophone
- Jon Christensen - drums
- Jan Allan, Maffy Falay, Bertil Lövgren - trumpet
- Erik Nilsson - baritone saxophone, bass clarinet, flute
- Rune Gustafsson - guitar
- Stanton Davis - trumpet, flugelhorn (tracks 1–3)
- Terje Rypdal - electric guitar (tracks 1–3)
- Arild Andersen - bass (tracks 1–3)
- Lars Samuelsson - trumpet (tracks 1–3)
- Arne Domnerus - alto saxophone, clarinet (tracks 1–3)
- Claes Rosendahl - tenor saxophone, alto saxophone, soprano saxophone, flute (tracks 1–3)
- Lennart Åberg - tenor saxophone, soprano saxophone, flute (tracks 1–3)
- Olle Lind - bass trombone (tracks 1–3)
- Berndt Egerbladh - vibraphone, xylophone (tracks 1–3)
- Bengt Hallberg - piano (tracks 1–3)
- Georg Riedel - bass (tracks 1–3)
- Egil Johansen - drums (tracks 1–3)
- Sabu Martinez - congas (tracks 1–3)
- Georg Vernon, Gunnar Medberg - trombone (track 4)
- Runo Ericksson - bass trombone (track 4)
- Christer Boustedt, Claes Rosendahl - alto saxophone (track 4)
- Bernt Rosengren - tenor saxophone (track 4)
- Roman Dylag - bass (track 4)
- Rupert Clemendore - congas (track 4)
