= Bengt Berger =

Swedish jazz musician (1942–2026)

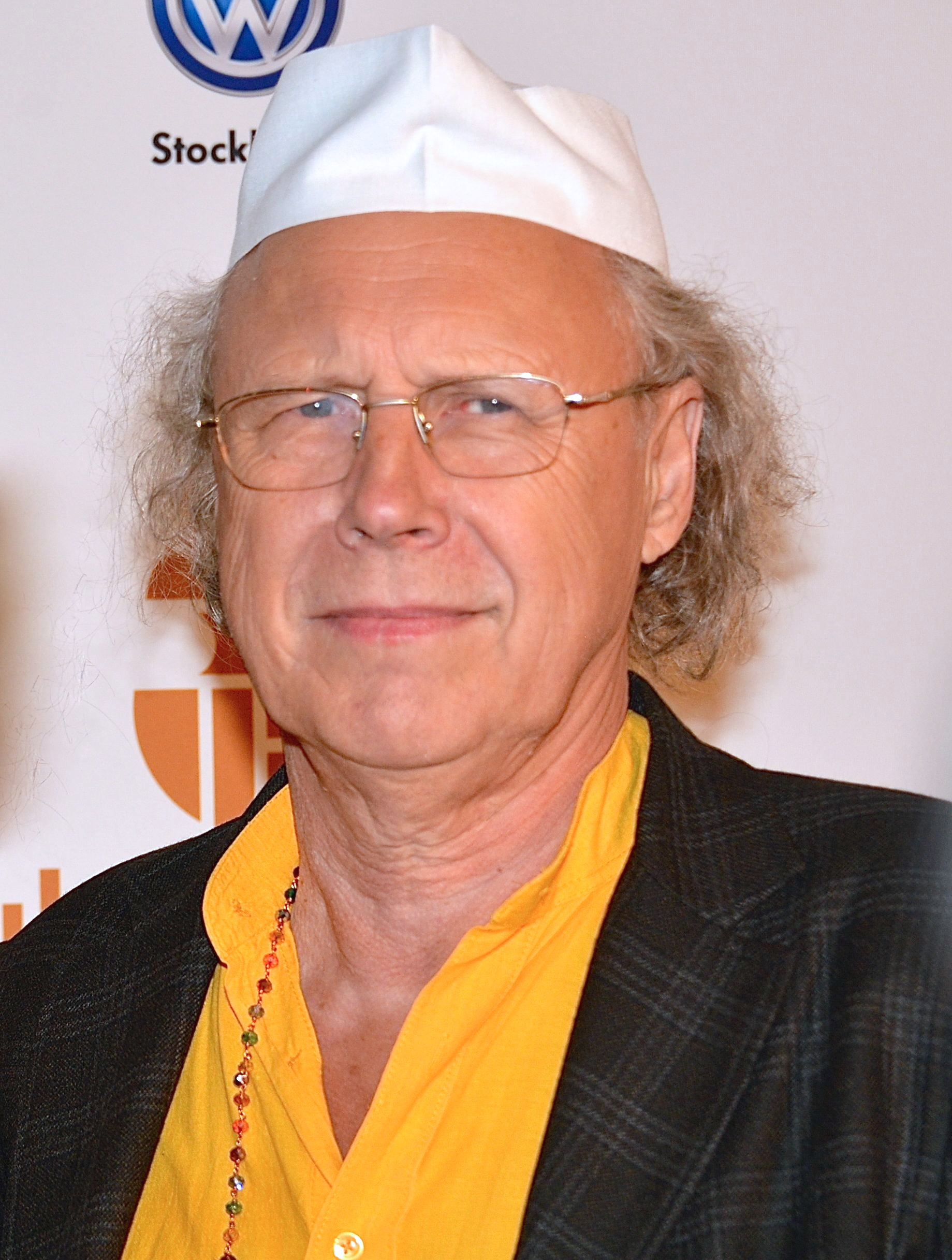
- Berger in 2013

Background information
- Born: 31 August 1942; Stockholm, Sweden
- Died: 15 May 2026 (aged 83)
- Genres: Jazz
- Occupations: Drummer; composer; producer
- Instrument: Drums

Bengt Berger (31 August 1942 – 15 May 2026) was a Swedish jazz drummer, composer and producer.

Berger studied north and south Indian music since the 1960s with Pandit Taranath Rama Rao and Mridangam Vidwan P.S. Devarajan and played the tabla and mridangam. He died on 15 May 2026, at the age of 83.

== Discography ==
- Spelar (1978)
- Bitter Funeral Beer (ECM, 1981)
- Praise Drumming (Dragon, 1987)
- Tarang (Rub-a-Dub, 1995)
- All Time High (Amigo, 1999)
- Live in Frankfurt 82 (Country & Eastern, 2007)
- Beches Brew (Country & Eastern, 2009)
- Blues for E.D. (Gazell, 2012)
- The Vedbod Tapes (Country & Eastern, 2012)
- Beches Brew Big (Country & Eastern, 2013)
- Blue Blue With Knutsson, Spering, Schultz (2015)
- Gothenburg (Country & Eastern, 2018)

=== As sideman ===
- Lennart Aberg, Green Prints (Caprice, 1986)
- Don Cherry, Organic Music Society (Carpice, 1973)
- Don Cherry, Eternal Now (Sonet, 1974)
- Dag Vag, Almanacka (Silence, 1983)
- Zia Mohiuddin Dagar & Pandit Taranath, Live In Stockholm 1969 (Country & Eastern, 2015)
- Eagle-Eye Cherry, Desireless (Polydor, 1998)
- Mecki Mark Men, Mecki Mark Men (Universal, 2008)
- Mynta, Short Conversation (Fat & Tapes, 1985)
- Rena Rama, Jazz I Sverige 73 (Caprice, 1973)
- Bernt Rosengren, Notes from Underground (Harvest, 1974)
