= Jazz in the Space Age =

Studio album by George Russell
- Released: 1960
- Recorded: May, 1960 & August, 1960
- Genre: Jazz
- Length: 42:29
- Label: Decca DL 9219

George Russell chronology
New York, N.Y. (1959)	Jazz in the Space Age (1960)	George Russell Sextet at the Five Spot (1960)

Professional ratings
Review scores
Source	Rating
Allmusic	4.5/5 stars
The Rolling Stone Jazz Record Guide	5/5 stars
The Penguin Guide to Jazz Recordings	4/4 stars

Jazz in the Space Age is an album by George Russell originally released on Decca in 1960. The album contains tracks conducted and arranged by Russell performed by Ernie Royal, Bob Brookmeyer, Frank Rehak, Al Kiger, Marky Markowitz, David Baker, Jimmy Buffington, Hal McKusick, Dave Young, Sol Schlinger, Bill Evans, Paul Bley, Barry Galbraith, Howard Collins, Milt Hinton, Don Lamond and Charlie Persip.

== Reception ==
The Allmusic review by Ken Dryden states that "The three-part suite "Chromatic Universe" is an ambitious work which mixes free improvisation with written passages that have not only stood the test of time but still sound very fresh. "The Lydiot" focuses on the soloists, while incorporating elements from "Chromatic Universe" and other Russell compositions... the slow, somewhat mysterious "Waltz From Outer Space", which incorporates an Oriental-sounding theme, and "Dimensions", described by its composer as "a sequence of freely associated moods indigenous to jazz... represents some of George Russell's greatest achievements".

== Track listing ==
All compositions by George Russell

1. "Chromatic Universe, Part 1" - 3:33
2. "Dimensions" - 13:11
3. "Chromatic Universe, Part 2" - 3:47
4. "The Lydiot" - 10:04
5. "Waltz from Outer Space" - 6:59
6. "Chromatic Universe, Part 3" - 4:55

- Recorded May–August 1, 1960 in NYC

== Personnel ==
- George Russell: arranger, conductor
- Ernie Royal: trumpet
- Al Kiger: trumpet
- Marky Markowitz: trumpet
- Frank Rehak: trombone
- David Baker: trombone
- Bob Brookmeyer: valve trombone
- Jimmy Buffington: french horn
- Hal McKusick: alto saxophone
- Dave Young: tenor saxophone
- Sol Schlinger: baritone saxophone
- Bill Evans: piano
- Paul Bley: piano
- Barry Galbraith: guitar
- Howard Collins: guitar
- Milt Hinton: bass
- Don Lamond: drums
- Charlie Persip: drums
