= The African Game =

Live album by George Russell & The Living Time Orchestra
- Released: 1984
- Recorded: June 18, 1983
- Genre: Jazz
- Length: 45:20
- Label: Blue Note
- Producer: George Russell

George Russell chronology
| Live in an American Time Spiral (1983) | The African Game (1984) | So What (1987) |

Professional ratings
Review scores
| Source | Rating |
|---|---|
| Allmusic | 3/5 stars |

The African Game is a live album by George Russell released on the Blue Note label in 1984, featuring performances by Russell with his Living Time Orchestra recorded in 1983 in Boston. The Allmusic review by Richard S. Ginell awarded the album 3 stars and states "The African Game is a major statement, a highly eclectic, nine-part, 45-minute suite for augmented big band that attempts to depict no less than the evolution of the species from the beginning of time to the present from an African perspective. Well, yes, this theme has been taken on by many an ambitious artist in every field, but Russell's work is remarkably successful because it tries to embrace a massive world of sound in open, colorful, young-thinking terms, with degrees of timbral unity and emotion to keep the idioms from flying out of control".

== Track listing ==
All compositions by George Russell

1. "Event I: Organic Life on Earth Begins" - 6:38
2. "Event II: The Paleolithic Game" - 4:32
3. "Event III: Consciousness" - 2:22
4. "Event IV: The Survival Game" - 7:45
5. "Event V: The Human Sensing of Unity with Nature" - 0:50
6. "Event VI: African Empires" - 8:23
7. "Event VII: Cartesian Man" - 3:28
8. "Event VIII: The Mega-Minimalist Age" - 4:04
9. "Event IX: The Future?" - 7:18

- Recorded live at Emmanuel Church, Boston, Massachusetts, June 18, 1983.

== Personnel ==
- George Russell - conductor, arranger
- Marc Rossi, Bruce Barth - keyboards
- George Garzone - tenor saxophone, soprano saxophone
- Gary Joynes - tenor saxophone, soprano saxophone, flute
- Dave Mann - alto saxophone, soprano saxophone, flute
- Janis Steprans - alto saxophone, soprano saxophone, flute
- Brad Jones - baritone saxophone, bass clarinet, flute
- Mike Peipman, Chris Passin, Roy Okutani, Mark Harvey - trumpet
- Peter Cirelli, Chip Kaner - trombone
- Jeff Marsanskas - bass trombone
- Marshall Sealy - french horn
- Mark White - guitar
- Bob Nieske - acoustic bass
- Bill Urmson - fender bass
- Keith Copeland - drums
- Dave Hagedorn - percussion
- Olu Bata: Joe Galeota, Lazaro Perez, Kuto Perez, Amaro Laria, Enrique Cardenas - African drums
