= Othello Ballet Suite/Electronic Organ Sonata No. 1 =

Studio album by George Russell
- Released: 1970
- Recorded: November 3 & 4, 1967 and October 1, 1968
- Studios: Radio Sweden, Stockholm, Sweden and Grorud Church, Oslo, Norway
- Genre: Jazz
- Length: 43:15
- Labels: Sonet (SLP 1409) (Sweden); Flying Dutchman (FDS 122) (US)
- Producer: George Russell

George Russell chronology
George Russell Sextet at Beethoven Hall (1965)	Othello Ballet Suite/Electronic Organ Sonata No. 1 (1970)	The Essence of George Russell (1971)

Othello Ballet Suite/Electronic Organ Sonata No. 1 is an album by composer George Russell which was recorded in Europe and released by the Swedish Sonet Records and by the Flying Dutchman label in the US in 1970. The album was reissued in 1981 on the Italian Soul Note label

== Recording ==
Othello was recorded November 3, 1967, at the studios of Radio Sweden in Stockholm. The basic material for Electronic Organ Sonata was recorded October 1, 1968 on the grand church organ of Grorud Church, Oslo. Technical work and final assemblage was performed in the electronic music studios of Radio Sweden.

== Reception ==
Professional ratings
Review scores
Source	Rating
AllMusic	3/5 stars
The Rolling Stone Jazz Record Guide	4/5 stars
The Penguin Guide to Jazz Recordings	2.5/4 stars

AllMusic reviewer Ron Wynn stated: "An uneven but compelling work by George Russell that combines jazz, classical, and Shakespeare. The results range from magnificent to chaotic; there's a large band that includes mostly obscure foreign musicians. It was one of the first times that Norway's Jan Garbarek appeared playing tenor sax on a major label".

== Tracks ==
1. Othello Ballet Suite (Part I)

- Alto Saxophone – Arne Domnerus
- Drums – Jon Christensen
- Orchestra – Swedish Radio Symphony Orchestra, The
- Tenor Saxophone – Bernt Rosengren, Jan Garbarek
- Trumpet – Rolf Eriksson

2. Othello Ballet Suite (Part II)

- Alto Saxophone – Arne Domnerus
- Drums – Jon Christensen
- Orchestra – Swedish Radio Symphony Orchestra, The
- Tenor Saxophone – Bernt Rosengren, Jan Garbarek
- Trumpet – Rolf Eriksson (

3. Electronic Organ Sonata No. 1

- Engineer [Recording] – Bjornar Andresen, Kåre Kolberg
- Organ [Church Organ] – George Russell

== Credits ==
- Mixed by, Engineer – Gote Nilsson
- Producer, composed by – George Russell
