= Frank Tiberi =

American saxophonist

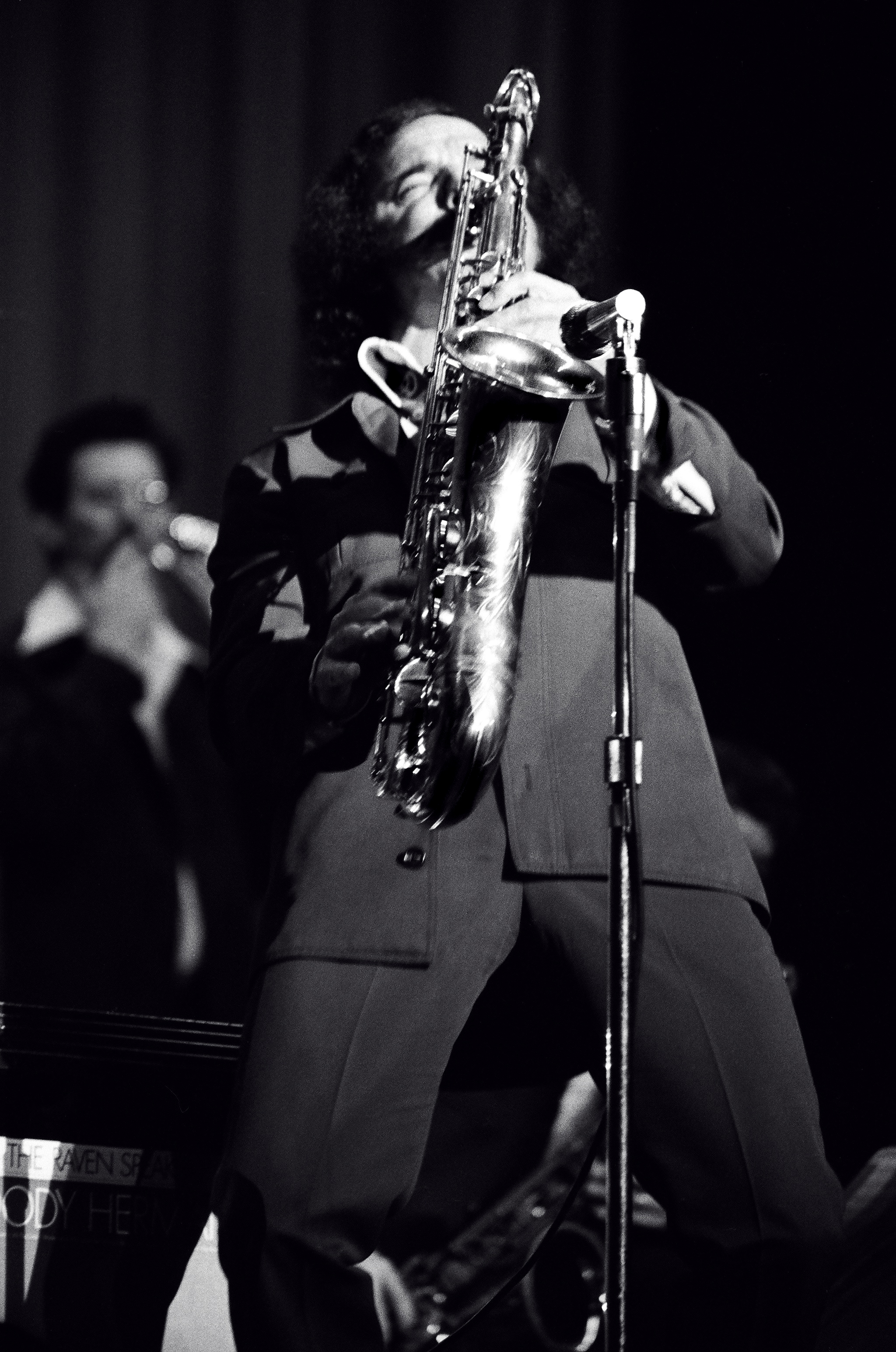
- Frank Tiberi playing tenor saxophone in 1976

Background information
- Born: December 4, 1928 (age 97); Camden, New Jersey, U.S.
- Genre: Jazz
- Occupation: Musician
- Instrument: Saxophone
- Years active: 1930s–present
- Website: www.franktiberi.com

Frank Tiberi (born December 4, 1928) is an American saxophonist and the leader of the Woody Herman Orchestra. He was born in Camden, New Jersey, United States. He was named successor by Woody Herman shortly before Herman's death, and Tiberi has led the band since 1987.

He plays the alto and tenor saxophone, bassoon, clarinet, and flute. He has been performing and recording since age 13. Tiberi toured with Benny Goodman and Urbie Green, and he played with Dizzy Gillespie. He had a period in the late-1960s when he was a studio musician, although by 1969 he was hired as Herman's lead saxophone soloist. He remained in that role until Herman's death, sometimes taking over his duties when ill-health affected Herman in his later years.

Tiberi is a professor at Berklee College of Music, where he teaches improvisational techniques and pedagogy. He served as director for the Camden Jazz Festival in New Jersey. He specializes in modern and contemporary jazz techniques and has released eponymous albums and with fellow Berklee instructor, George Garzone.

During the early-1960s, Tiberi became interested in John Coltrane and his developing style of playing, investing in a portable reel-to-reel tape recorder to capture Coltrane's performances at venues across Philadelphia and New York City. He used these recordings to transcribe Coltrane's solos, study his playing, and teach his students. The tapes amounted to around 26 hours of music, and their existence had remained largely elusive for decades; however, a selection of material from the tapes was released in various box set formats via Impulse! Records in November 2026 for Coltrane's centennial. The curated content, an album titled The Tiberi Tapes, includes tracks such as two live recordings of Giant Steps, and a thirty-minute version of Resolution, a song from Coltrane's A Love Supreme. A wider collector's edition of Tiberi's complete archive is expected to be released in 2027 as The Tiberi Tapes: The Complete Recordings, featuring the full 26 hours of over 100 Coltrane performances. In April 2026, a single LP preview titled The Tiberi Tapes: A Preview of the Mythic Recordings was released for Record Store Day.

== Discography ==
- Tiberian Mode (1999)
- 4 Brothers 7 (2007)
- Audacity (2012)
