= Live in an American Time Spiral =

Live album by George Russell
- Released: 1983
- Recorded: July 30 & 31 1982
- Genre: Jazz
- Length: 49:12
- Label: Soul Note
- Producer: George Russell

George Russell chronology
Electronic Sonata for Souls Loved by Nature - 1980 (1980)	Live in an American Time Spiral (1983)	The African Game (1984)

Professional ratings
Review scores
Source	Rating
Allmusic	3/5 stars
The Rolling Stone Jazz Record Guide	3/5 stars
The Penguin Guide to Jazz Recordings	3.5/4 stars

Live in an American Time Spiral is a live album by George Russell released on the Italian Soul Note label in 1983, featuring performances by Russell with his New York Band recorded in 1982.

== Reception ==
The Allmusic review awarded the album 3 stars.

== Track listing ==
All compositions by George Russell

1. "Time Spiral" - 22:25
2. "Ezz-Thetic" - 16:30
3. "D.C. Divertimento" - 10:17

- Recorded in New York City on July 30 & 31, 1982.

== Personnel ==
- George Russell - conductor, arranger
- Ron Tooley, Stanton Davis, Brian Leach, Tom Harrell - trumpet
- Ray Anderson, Earl McIntyre - trombone
- Marty Ehrlich - alto saxophone, flute
- Doug Miller - tenor saxophone, flute
- Bob Hanlon - baritone saxophone
- Jerome Harris - guitar
- Ron McClure - bass
- Jack Reilly, Mark Soskin - keyboards
- Victor Lewis - drums
