= Bitter Funeral Beer =

Studio album by the Bengt Berger Bitter Funeral Beer Band with Don Cherry
- Released: 1982
- Recorded: January 1981
- Studios: Decibel Studios; Stockholm, Sweden
- Genre: Jazz
- Length: 43:02
- Label: ECM 1179
- Producer: Manfred Eicher

Bengt Berger chronology
Spelar (1977)	Bitter Funeral Beer (1982)	Praise Drumming (1987)

Bitter Funeral Beer is an album by the Bengt Berger Bitter Funeral Beer Band with Don Cherry recorded in January 1981 and released on ECM the following year.

== Reception ==
The AllMusic review by Brian Olewnick awarded the album 4½ stars stating "the combination of stunningly gorgeous repeating themes and inspired improvising make one wish the music would never stop. This recording, though little known, is one of the very finest items ever released by ECM. While wonderful in and of itself, it might also serve as a fine introduction to West African music, albeit via a circuitous route through Stockholm."

Professional ratings
Review scores
Source	Rating
Allmusic	4.5/5 stars

== Track listing ==
All traditional compositions arranged by Bengt Berger

1. "Bitter Funeral Beer" – 9:18
2. "Blekete" – 3:05
3. "Chetu" – 3:20
4. "Tongsi" – 5:03
5. "Darafo/Funeral Dance (Dar Kpee)" – 22:16

== Personnel ==
=== Bengt Berger Bitter Funeral Beer Band ===
- Bengt Berger – xylophone (ko-gyil – Lo Birifor funeral xylophone)
- Don Cherry – pocket trumpet
- Tord Bengtsson – violin, electric guitar
- Jörgen Adolfsson – violin, sopranino saxophone, soprano saxophone, alto saxophone
- Tommy Adolfsson – trumpet
- Christer Bothen – bass clarinet, tenor saxophone
- Thomas Mera Gartz – violin, tenor saxophone, drums
- Matthias Hellden – cello
- Ulf Wallander – soprano saxophone, tenor saxophone;
- Kjell Westling – sopranino saxophone, bass clarinet
- Sigge Krantz – electric guitar, bass
- Bosse Skoglund – drums
- Anita Livstrand – voice, bells, axatse (rattle)
