= Living Time =

Studio album by Bill Evans George Russell Orchestra
- Released: 1972
- Recorded: May 12–14, 1972 in New York City
- Genre: Jazz
- Length: 44:19
- Label: Columbia
- Producer: Helen Keane

Bill Evans chronology
The Bill Evans Album (1971)	Living Time (1972)	The Tokyo Concert (1973)

George Russell chronology
Listen to the Silence (1983)	Living Time (1972)	Vertical Form VI (1977)

Professional ratings
Review scores
Source	Rating
Allmusic	2/5 stars
The Rolling Stone Jazz Record Guide	4/5 stars

Living Time is an album by the Bill Evans George Russell Orchestra recorded in 1972 and released on the Columbia label, featuring performances by Evans with an orchestra conducted by Russell.

== Reception ==
The Allmusic review by Scott Yanow awarded the album 2 stars and stated "The music on this set unfortunately is not all that interesting. Russell's lengthy and episodic work "Living Time" (which has eight "events") features crowded ensembles as played by Evans' trio plus 19 musicians (including two additional keyboardists). Despite the major names in the "backup group" the focus throughout is on Evans' acoustic and electric keyboards. The problem is that the music is rather dull and surprisingly forgettable."

== Track listing ==
All compositions by George Russell

1. "Living Time: Event I" – 3:50
2. "Living Time: Event II" – 8:22
3. "Living Time: Event III" – 2:47
4. "Living Time: Event IV" – 5:30
5. "Living Time: Event V" – 11:52
6. "Living Time: Event VI" – 4:13
7. "Living Time: Event VII" – 2:07
8. "Living Time: Event VIII" – 5:38

== Personnel ==
- George Russell – arranger, conductor
- Bill Evans – piano, Fender Rhodes piano
- Snooky Young, Ernie Royal, Richard Williams – trumpet, flugelhorn
- Stanton Davis – trumpet
- Howard Johnson – flugelhorn, tuba, bass clarinet
- John Clark – french horn
- Dave Bargeron – tuba
- Jimmy Giuffre – tenor saxophone, flute
- Joe Henderson - tenor saxophone
- Sam Rivers – tenor saxophone, flute, oboe
- Sam Brown – bass guitar, electric guitar
- Ted "Theo" Saunders – electric piano, clavinet
- Webster Lewis – organ, electric piano
- Eddie Gómez – acoustic bass
- Ron Carter (on 5,7), Stanley Clarke (on 1,2,3), Herb Bushler (on 4,6,8) – Fender bass
- Tony Williams, Marty Morell – drums
- Marc Belair – percussion
- Edd Kolakowski - Steinway piano technician
