= Triple Exposure =

Studio album by Hal McKusick
- Released: 1957
- Recorded: December 27, 1957; Van Gelder Studio, Hackensack, New Jersey
- Genre: Jazz
- Length: 58:40 CD reissue with bonus tracks
- Label: Prestige; PRLP 7135
- Producer: Bob Weinstock

Hal McKusick chronology
Hal McKusick Quintet (1957)	Triple Exposure (1957)	Cross Section-Saxes (1958)

Triple Exposure is an album by saxophonist Hal McKusick which was recorded in 1957 and released on the Prestige label.

== Reception ==
Professional ratings
Review scores
Source	Rating
Allmusic	3/5 stars

Scott Yanow of Allmusic stated, "Two talented but forgotten bop-based improvisers are featured on this quintet set: Hal McKusick (who switches between his Paul Desmond-inspired alto, tenor and cool-toned clarinet) and trombonist Billy Byers".

== Track listing ==
All compositions by Hal McKusick except as indicated

1. "Interim" - 5:51 Bonus track on CD reissue
2. "Saturday Night (Is the Loneliest Night of the Week)" (Jule Styne, Sammy Cahn) - 7:13
3. "Don't Worry 'bout Me" (Rube Bloom, Ted Koehler) - 8:09 Bonus track on CD reissue
4. "Con Alma" (Dizzy Gillespie) - 7:43 Bonus track on CD reissue
5. "Something New" (Albert Gamse, Ricardo López Méndez) - 5:11
6. "Blues Half-Smiling" - 5:33
7. "A Touch of Spring" - 6:00
8. "The Settlers and the Indians" (Robert Scott) - 9:10
9. "I'm Glad There Is You" (Jimmy Dorsey, Paul Madeira) - 3:50

== Personnel ==
- Hal McKusick - alto saxophone, tenor saxophone, clarinet
- Billy Byers - trombone
- Eddie Costa - piano
- Paul Chambers - bass
- Charlie Persip - drums
