= Ezz-thetics =

Studio album by George Russell Sextet
- Released: June or July 1961
- Recorded: May 1961
- Genre: Avant-garde jazz, post-bop
- Length: 42:29
- Label: Riverside
- Producer: Orrin Keepnews

George Russell Sextet chronology
George Russell Sextet in K.C. (1961)	Ezz-thetics (1961)	The Stratus Seekers (1962)

Ezz-thetics is a studio album by the George Russell sextet, released on Riverside Records in mid-1961.

== Recording and music ==
The album was recorded in May 1961. In addition to himself on piano, Russell's sextet contained trumpeter Don Ellis, trombonist Dave Baker, Eric Dolphy on alto sax and bass clarinet, Steve Swallow on bass, and Joe Hunt on drums. Three of the tracks were written by Russell. It features a radical reworking of Thelonious Monk's standard "Round Midnight" with an extended solo by Eric Dolphy.

== Reception ==
Professional ratings
Review scores
Source	Rating
AllMusic	5/5 stars
The Rolling Stone Jazz Record Guide	5/5 stars
The Penguin Guide to Jazz	4/4 stars

The AllMusic reviewer described the album as "a true classic", and added that, "although using ideas from avant-garde jazz, it does not fall into any simple category". The Penguin Guide to Jazz suggested that it was a good place in Russell's discography for a listener to start.

== Track listing ==
1. "Ezz-thetic" (Russell) – 8:57
2. "Nardis" (Miles Davis) – 4:34
3. "Lydiot" (Russell) – 8:06
4. "Thoughts" (Russell) – 5:26
5. "Honesty" (David Baker) – 8:55
6. "Round Midnight" (Thelonious Monk) – 6:29
7. "Kige's Tune" (Al Kiger) (take 2) *
8. "Kige's Tune" (Al Kiger) (take 5) *

* Bonus tracks, issued for the first time on 2007 CD remaster:

== Personnel ==
- George Russell - piano, arranger
- Don Ellis - trumpet
- Dave Baker - trombone
- Eric Dolphy - alto sax, bass clarinet
- Steve Swallow - bass
- Joe Hunt - drums
