= Smithsonian Jazz Masterworks Orchestra =

American jazz orchestra

- Jazz orchestra
- Short name: SJMO
- Founded: 1990
- Location: Washington, D.C,
- Concert hall: National Museum of American History Auditorium
- Music director: Charlie Young

The Smithsonian Jazz Masterworks Orchestra (SJMO) is the national jazz orchestra of the United States. It is based at the National Museum of American History in Washington, D.C., where it is the orchestra-in-residence. The SJMO was founded in 1990 with the dual mission of performing and preserving American jazz masterworks and raising public awareness and understanding of the genre.

== History ==
An Act of Congress established the orchestra in 1990 with an appropriation to the Smithsonian Institution of $242,000. In 1991 Gunther Schuller and David Baker became the original artistic and musical directors of the orchestra, which began performing in 1991. Five years later Baker became its sole artistic and musical director.

The inaugural season, jointly conducted by Schuller and Baker, consisted of six weekends of free concerts for which the conductors collected or commissioned transcriptions of the original arrangements of the works to be presented and provided the orchestra's members with tapes of the original performances.

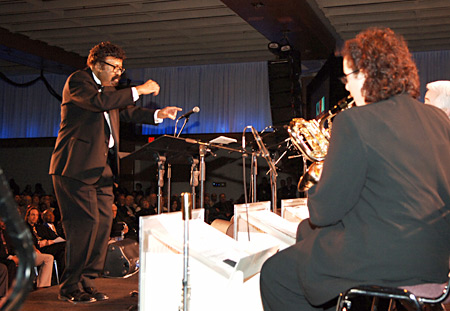
David Baker leading the Smithsonian Jazz Masterworks Orchestra during the NEA Jazz Masters awards ceremony and concert in 2008

Since 1991 the SJMO has performed in nine foreign countries and twenty-six U.S. states, in addition to numerous free concerts in Washington, D.C. Appearances outside their base at the National Museum of American History have included a performance at the White House in 1993 to celebrate the 40th anniversary of the Newport Jazz Festival; the Cultural Olympiad at the 1996 Summer Olympics in Atlanta, Georgia; and a 1999 tour of the United States to present concerts in tribute to the 100th anniversary of Duke Ellington's birth that included a concert performance at the Monterey Jazz Festival featuring Ellington's Suite Thursday, which was commissioned for the festival. Among the orchestra's notable performances under Baker's leadership outside the United States was a concert in Egypt in 2008, when it played at the Cairo Opera House, the Alexandra Opera House, and at the Pyramids.

In 2012, at the age of 80, Baker concluded his tenure as the SJMO's artistic director, and was named maestro emeritus in December 2012. The occasion was marked by a special concert consisting entirely of Baker's compositions. Charlie Young, a jazz saxophonist and educator at Howard University, became artistic director after Baker's retirement.

== Members ==
As of 2015, the orchestra's principal members were:

Artistic and Musical Director

Reeds

- Steve Williams
- Bill Mulligan
- Scott Silbert
- Luis Hernandez
- Leigh Pilzer

Trumpets

- Joshua Kauffman
- Tom Williams
- Kenny Rittenhouse

Trombones

- Jennifer Krupa
- Matt Niess
- Bill Holmes
- Jeff Cortazzo

Piano

- Tony Nalker

Bass

- Amy Shook

Drums

- Steve Fidyk

== Discography ==
The orchestra's recordings include:

- Bernstein Reimagined
- Tribute to a Generation: A Salute to the Big Bands
- Tri-C Jazzfest 2001
- Piano Grand! A Smithsonian Celebration
- Big Band Treasures Live
- Live at MCG
