= Listen to the Silence =

Live album by George Russell
- Released: 1973
- Recorded: June 26, 1971
- Genre: Jazz
- Length: 45:04
- Label: Concept Records
- Producer: George Russell

George Russell chronology
Trip to Prillarguri (1970)	Listen to the Silence (1973)	Living Time (1972)

Listen to the Silence is a live album by George Russell originally recorded in 1971 and released on the Concept label in 1973, featuring a performance by Russell with Stanton Davis, Jan Garbarek, Terje Rypdal, Arild Andersen, and Jon Christensen with vocal chorus.

== Reception ==
The Allmusic review awarded the album 3 stars.

Professional ratings
Review scores
Source	Rating
Allmusic	3/5 stars
The Rolling Stone Jazz Record Guide	4/5 stars
The Penguin Guide to Jazz Recordings	3/4 stars

== Track listing ==
All compositions by George Russell - Text Credits: "Bury My Heart at Wounded Knee" by Dee Brown, "The Mark" by Maurice Nicoll, "Duino Elegies" by Rainer Maria Rilke

1. "Event I" - 6:31
2. "Event II" - 8:19
3. "Event III" - 16:18
4. "Event IV" - 13:56

- Recorded the Kongsberg Church in Kongsberg, Norway on June 26, 1971.

== Personnel ==
- George Russell - timpani, arranger
- Stanton Davis - trumpet
- Jan Garbarek - tenor saxophone
- Terje Rypdal - electric guitar
- Webster Lewis - organ
- Bobo Stenson - electric piano
- Bjørnar Andresen - fender bass
- Arild Andersen - acoustic bass
- Jon Christensen - percussion
- Chorus of the Conservatory of Music in Oslo, Norway - Arnulv Hegstad, conductor
- Supplementally Chorus from the New England Conservatory
- Sue Auclair, Gailanne Cummings - soprano voice
- Joyce Gippo, Kay Dunlap - alto voice
- David Dusing, Ray Hardin - tenor voice
- Don Kendrick, Don Hovey, Dan Windham - bass voice
