= New York, N.Y. (album) =

Studio album by George Russell
- Released: July or August 1959
- Recorded: 1958–1959
- Genre: Jazz
- Length: 45:28
- Label: Decca

George Russell chronology
The Jazz Workshop (1957)	New York, N.Y. (1959)	Jazz in the Space Age (1960)

CD reissue cover

Professional ratings
Review scores
Source	Rating
AllMusic	4.5/5 stars
The Penguin Guide to Jazz	3/4 stars
The Rolling Stone Jazz Record Guide	5/5 stars
Down Beat	5/5 stars

New York, N.Y. is an album by George Russell, originally released on Decca in either July or August 1959.

== Recording and music ==
The album was recorded in 1958 and 1959. Vocalist Jon Hendricks links some of the orchestral performances.

== Release and reception ==
New York, N.Y. was released by Decca Records in July or August 1959. The AllMusic review by Ken Dryden states that "George Russell was one of the most forward-thinking composers and arrangers on the jazz scene during the 1950s, but his work was generally more appreciated by musicians than the jazz-buying public. New York, New York [sic] represents one of many high points in his career... In Rodgers & Hart's "Manhattan", Russell has the soloists playing over the orchestra's vamp, while he also creates an imaginative "East Side Medley" combining the standards "Autumn in New York" and "How About You." His original material is just as striking as his arrangements".

== Track listing ==
All compositions by George Russell except as indicated

1. "Manhattan" (Lorenz Hart, Richard Rodgers) - 10:34
2. "Big City Blues" - 11:40
3. Manhattan: "Rico" - 10:12
4. East Side Medley: "Autumn in New York"/"How About You?" (Vernon Duke, Ira Gershwin)/(Ralph Freed, Burton Lane) - 8:01
5. "A Helluva Town" - 5:01

== Personnel ==
- George Russell – arranger, conductor
- Art Farmer – trumpet
- Doc Severinsen – trumpet
- Ernie Royal – trumpet
- Joe Wilder – trumpet
- Joe Ferrante – trumpet
- Bob Brookmeyer - valve trombone
- Frank Rehak – trombone
- Tom Mitchell – trombone
- Jimmy Cleveland – trombone
- Hal McKusick – alto saxophone
- Phil Woods – alto saxophone
- John Coltrane – tenor saxophone
- Al Cohn – tenor saxophone
- Benny Golson – tenor saxophone
- Sol Schlinger – baritone saxophone
- Gene Allen – baritone saxophone
- Bill Evans – piano
- Barry Galbraith – guitar
- George Duvivier – bass
- Milt Hinton – bass
- Charlie Persip – drums
- Max Roach – drums
- Don Lamond – drums
- Al Epstein – percussion
- Jon Hendricks – vocals
