= Trip to Prillarguri =

Live album by George Russell
- Released: 1982
- Recorded: March 1970
- Genre: Jazz
- Length: 47:53
- Label: Soul Note
- Producer: George Russell

George Russell chronology
Electronic Sonata for Souls Loved by Nature (1971)	Trip to Prillarguri (1982)	Listen to the Silence (1971)

Professional ratings
Review scores
Source	Rating
Allmusic	3/5 stars
The Rolling Stone Jazz Record Guide	4/5 stars
The Penguin Guide to Jazz Recordings	2.5/4 stars

Trip to Prillarguri is a live album by George Russell originally recorded in 1970 and subsequently released on the Italian Soul Note label in 1982, featuring a performance by Russell with Stanton Davis, Jan Garbarek, Terje Rypdal, Arild Andersen, and Jon Christensen. The Allmusic review awarded the album 3 stars, although, as no review text appears to date, this can be considered the default rating for those albums awaiting a review.

== Track listing ==
All compositions by George Russell except as indicated

1. "Theme (Jan Garbarek) – 7:11
2. "Souls" – 8:41
3. "Event III" – 3:03
4. "Vips" (Garbarek) – 4:22
5. "Stratusphunk" – 8:40
6. "Esoteric Circle" (Garbarek) – 4:56
7. "Man On The Moon" (Ornette Coleman) – 11:00

- Recorded live at Estrad, Sodertalje, Sweden, March 1970.

== Personnel ==
- George Russell – piano
- Jan Garbarek – tenor saxophone
- Stanton Davis – trumpet
- Terje Rypdal – electric guitar
- Arild Andersen – bass
- Jon Christensen – drums
