= Rena Rama =

Swedish jazz band

Rena Rama was a Swedish jazz band formed in 1971, noted for mixing jazz, unusual time signatures, and African and Asian folk themes.

Its original personnel included Lennart Åberg (saxophone, flute), Bobo Stenson (piano), Palle Danielsson (bass), and Bengt Berger (drums). Both Stenson and Åberg previously had worked with Red Mitchell, and Danielsson with Steve Kuhn. Berger had previously studied percussion in India. Stenson had already recorded his first trio LP titled Underwear (ECM).

Recordings with the original lineup include the LP Rena Rama on the Caprice label, recorded in Stockholm in 1973. In 1977, Rena Rama released the LP Landscapes (JAPO), recorded in Oslo. Personnel was the same except for the addition of American drummer Leroy Lowe. In 1989 they recorded with Marilyn Mazur, released on the Dragon of Sweden label, with Anders Jormin on bass and Anders Kjellberg on drums.
