= 4 Brothers 7 =

Studio album by Frank Tiberi
- Released: April 10, 2007
- Genre: Jazz
- Length: 56:40
- Label: Jazzed Media

Frank Tiberi chronology
Tiberian Mode (1999)	4 Brothers 7 (2007)	Audacity (2012)

4 Brothers 7 is a 2007 album by American saxophonist Frank Tiberi and The Four Brothers Band, led by Tiberi since Woody Herman's death in 1989. It was released through Jazzed Media.

Tiberi was joined on the saxophone section by Mike Brignola, Larry McKenna, and John Nugent, while the rhythm section consisted of pianist David Berkman, bassist Lynn Seaton, and drummer Matt Wilson.

== Critical reception ==
4 Brothers 7
Review scores
Source	Rating
All About Jazz (Note: Reviewer: Jack Bowers)	3.5/5 stars
All About Jazz (Note: Reviewer: Gaylord Smith)	4/5 stars
AllMusic	4/5 stars
Audiophile Audition	3.5/5 stars
The News & Observer	3/5 stars

Ken Dryden of AllMusic deemed the album a "fun-filled session" which was "highly recommended". In a review for JazzTimes, Chris Kelsey wrote: "The group plays down arrangements of bop-era tunes... with loose precision, high spirits and good humor," adding that "Tiberi’s Coltrane-inspired, inside-out approach no longer seems as radical as it did in Herman’s ’70s and ’80s groups, yet he maintains a spontaneous edge and is the most interesting soloist."

The News & Observer's Owen Cordle praised the saxophone section work, which he described as "warm, mellow, ever-swinging and supple", adding that Tiberi's relatively light tone "gives a certain beauty and sometimes an ethereal quality to his lines." He concluded: "The saxophone harmonies and the drive of the rhythm section evoke Herman throughout the ages, and the solos reflect the modernity he always espoused."

Jack Bowers, writing for All About Jazz, stated: "Those who weren't there when the four brothers were born—and even those who were—should warm quickly to this earnest and entertaining cruise down memory lane." In a different review for All About Jazz, Gaylord Smith commented: "This is a CD that proves nostalgia has value beyond just remembering the good old days." Jeff Krow of Audiophile Audition opined that the ensemble "[brought] back the Four Brothers sound with a seamless blend."

== Track listing ==
4 Brothers 7
No.	Title	Length
1.	"Four Brothers"	3:51
2.	"Just You, Just Me"	5:33
3.	"Central Park West"	4:05
4.	"The Goof and I"	5:21
5.	"Woody's Whistle"	5:52
6.	"Buzzogle Boggled"	4:26
7.	"Woody 'N You"	5:03
8.	"Four of a Kind"	4:00
9.	"Woody's Lament"	4:22
10.	"The Garz and I"	5:52
11.	"Tenor Conclave"	8:10
Total length:		56:40

== Personnel ==
Credits via AllMusic

Main personnel

- Frank Tiberi – Arranger, Audio Production, Composer, Primary Artist, Producer, Sax (Soprano), Sax (Tenor), Soloist
- David Berkman – Piano, Soloist
- Michael Brignola – Adaptation, Arranger, Audio Production, Producer, Sax (Baritone), Soloist
- Larry McKenna – Arranger, Sax (Tenor), Soloist
- John Nugent – Arranger, Composer, Sax (Tenor), Soloist
- Lynn Seaton – Bass, Bass Instrument, Soloist
- Matt Wilson – Drums, Soloist
