= The London Concert (George Russell album) =

Live album by George Russell & The Living Time Orchestra
- Released: 1990
- Recorded: August 28–31, 1989
- Venue: Ronnie Scott's Jazz Club, London, England
- Genre: Jazz
- Length: 90:28
- Label: Label Bleu
- Producer: George Russell

George Russell chronology
New York (1988)	The London Concert (1990)	It's About Time (1996)

Professional ratings
Review scores
Source	Rating
Allmusic	3/5 stars
The Penguin Guide to Jazz Recordings	3/4 stars

The London Concert is a live album by George Russell released on the French Label Bleu label in 1990, featuring performances by Russell with his Living Time Orchestra recorded at Ronnie Scott's Jazz Club in 1989. The Allmusic review by awarded the album 3 stars.

== Track listing ==
All compositions by George Russell except where noted

- Disc One:
1. "La Folia: The Roccella Variations" (Russell, Ben Schwendener) - 10:21
2. "Uncommon Ground" - 21:35
3. "Electronic Sonata for Souls Loved by Nature [Events XI-XV]" (Jan Garbarek, Russell) - 19:38
4. "Listen to the Silence: Acknowledgements" - 2:12
- Disc Two:
1. "Struggle of the Magicians" (Mark White) - 6:52
2. "Six Aesthetic Gravities" - 19:35
3. "So What" (Miles Davis) - 10:15

- Recorded live at Ronnie Scott's Club, London, August 28–31, 1989.

== Personnel ==
- George Russell - conductor, arranger
- Stuart Brooks, Ian Carr, Mark Chandler - trumpet
- Pete Beachill - trombone
- Ashley Slater - bass trombone
- Andy Sheppard - tenor saxophone, soprano saxophone
- Chris Biscoe - alto saxophone, soprano saxophone, clarinet
- Pete Hurt - baritone saxophone, tenor saxophone, bass clarinet, flute
- Brad Hatfield, Steve Lodder - keyboards
- Bill Urmson - Fender bass
- David Fiuczynski - guitar
- Steve Johns - drums
- Dave Adams - percussion
