= Stanton Davis =

American jazz musician (1945–2026)

Stanton Davis Jr. (November 10, 1945 – April 18, 2026) was an American jazz trumpeter and educator.

== Life and career ==
Davis was born in New Orleans on November 10, 1945.

He studied at the Berklee College of Music (1967–69) and the New England Conservatory (1969–73), and served as program director for MIT's radio station from 1968 to 1974. He received his master's in ethnomusicology from Wesleyan University in 1983.

He initially played locally in the Boston area, and then with George Russell, Mercer Ellington, Lester Bowie, Charlie Haden, George Gruntz, Jim Pepper, Bob Stewart, Muhal Richard Abrams, Sam Rivers, Gil Evans, Webster Lewis, Jaki Byard, Max Roach, and James Moody.

He taught at Southeast Massachusetts University (1976–78), Wellesley College (1981–84), Bennington College (1980–82), and the New England Conservatory of Music (1980–82), and also worked with the Jazzmobile (1980–88).

His only major release as a bandleader is 1988's Manhattan Melody, released on Enja Records. There was an earlier LP from his Boston period called Brighter Days released in 1977 on Outrageous Records by his group named "Stanton Davis' Ghetto/Mysticism".

Davis died on April 18, 2026, at the age of 80.

== Discography ==
As leader

- Brighter Days (Outrageous Records Incorporated, 1977)
- Manhattan Melodies (Enja, 1988)

With Muhal Richard Abrams

- View from Within (Soul Note, 1984)

With Ray Anderson

- It Just So Happens (Enja, 1987)

With Lester Bowie

- I Only Have Eyes for You (ECM, 1985)
- Avant Pop (ECM, 1986)
- Twilight Dreams (Venture, 1987)
- Serious Fun (DIW, 1989)
- My Way (DIW, 1990)
- Live at the 6th Tokyo Music Joy (DIW, 1991)

With George Gruntz

- First Prize (Enja, 1989)

With Charlie Haden

- The Montreal Tapes: Liberation Music Orchestra (Verve, 1989 [1999])

With Jimmy McGriff

- You Ought to Think About Me (Headfirst, 1990)

With George Russell

- The Essence of George Russell (Sonet, 1969)
- Trip to Prillarguri (Soul Note, 1970)
- Listen to the Silence (Soul Note, 1971)
- Living Time (Columbia, 1974) with Bill Evans
- New York Big Band (Soul Note, 1978)
- Live in an American Time Spiral (Soul Note, 1982)
- The 80th Birthday Concert (Concept, 2003)

With Bob Stewart

- First Line (JMT, 1988)

== Sources ==
- Leonard Feather and Ira Gitler, The Biographical Encyclopedia of Music. Oxford, 1999, pp. 170–171.
