= George Garzone =

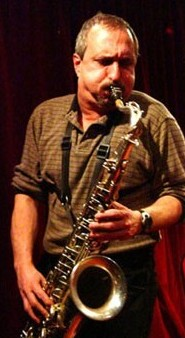
- Garzone in 2007

Background information
- Born: September 23, 1950 (age 76); Boston, Massachusetts, U.S.
- Genres: Jazz, free jazz
- Occupations: Musician, educator
- Instrument: Saxophone
- Years active: 1959–present
- Labels: Resolution, Northeastern, NYC
- Website: georgegarzone.com

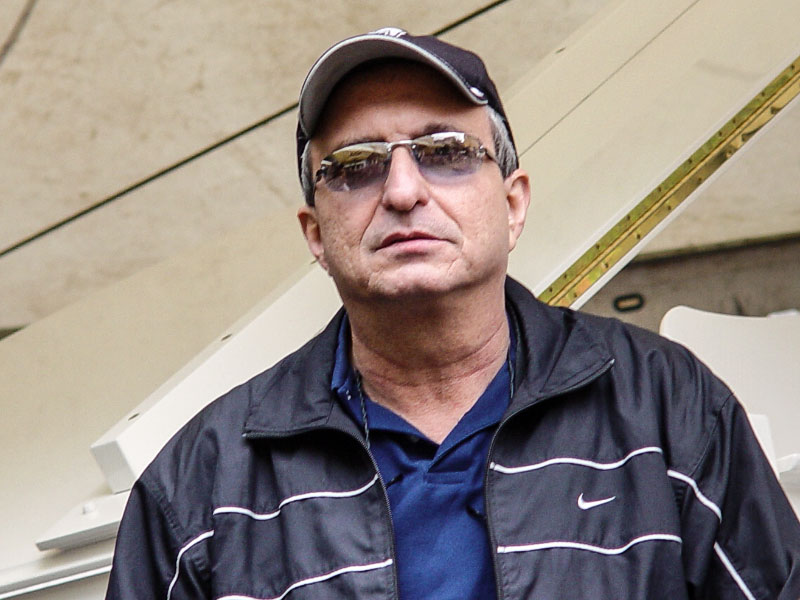
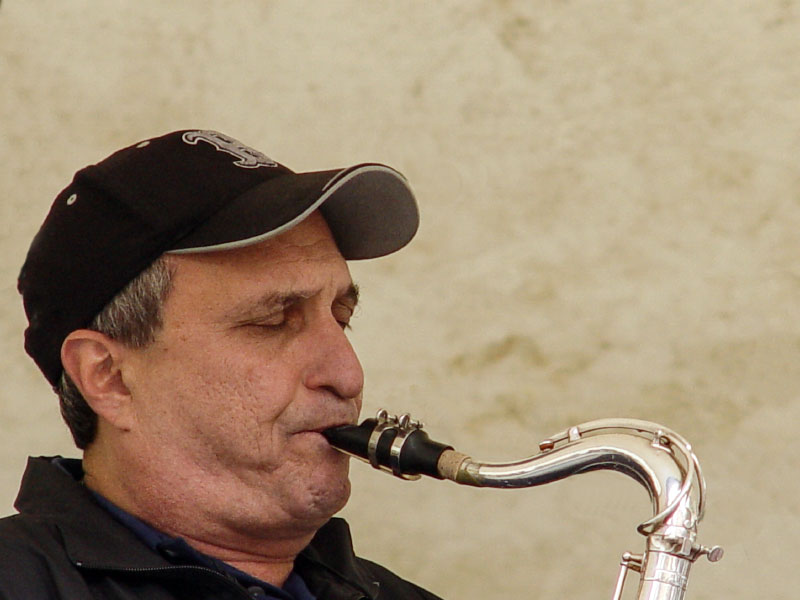
Garzone at the Copenhagen Jazz Festival, 2007

George Garzone (born September 23, 1950) is a saxophonist and jazz educator from Boston, Massachusetts.

== Biography ==
Garzone was born in on September 23, 1950, in Boston, Massachusetts, U.S.

He is a member of the Fringe, a jazz trio founded in 1972 that includes bassist John Lockwood and drummer Francisco Mela, who fills the drum chair occupied for over 50 years by the late Bob Gullotti. The group has released several albums. Garzone has appeared on over 20 recordings. He began on tenor saxophone when he was six, played in a family band, and attended music school in Boston. He toured Europe with Jamaaladeen Tacuma and performed with Jack DeJohnette, Joe Lovano, John Patitucci, Danilo Pérez, Rachel Z, and Bob Weir and Ratdog.

Garzone is also a jazz educator, teaching at the Berklee College of Music, New England Conservatory, Longy School of Music, New York University, and the New School for Jazz and Contemporary Music. He pioneered the triadic chromatic approach. His students include Mindi Abair, Branford Marsalis, Donny McCaslin, Danilo Pérez, Joshua Redman, Luciana Souza, and Mark Turner.

In 1995 he recorded a tribute to Stan Getz on NYC Records called Alone. Four's and Two's followed a year later with Joe Lovano, and in 1999 Garzone returned with Moodiology. Fringe in New York was released in summer 2000. With the Joe Lovano Nonet he recorded at the Village Vanguard in September 2002.

He has also performed with Don Alias, Kenny Barron, Paul Feeley, Dennis Chambers, Stanley Cowell, Anton Fig, Dan Gottlieb, Tom Harrell, Dave Holland, Dave Liebman, Cecil McBee, Bob Moses, Gary Peacock, Marvin Smith, Bill Stewart, Harvie Swartz, and Lenny White.

== Triadic chromatic approach ==
The triadic chromatic approach is an improvisatory method created by Garzone while teaching at colleges in Boston and New York City. The method was developed to allow the improviser to be able to improvise freely without having to concern themselves with what is going on harmonically.

This approach is applied by selecting one the four standard triads (major, minor, augmented, and diminished) and moving by a half step into another inversion of the same type of triad. This is a broad definition and there are many ways to be able to manipulate and change this approach.

== Educational Activities and Workshop ==
In 2008 and 2009, George Garzone taught jazz saxophone courses as part of the Jazz in Laurino summer seminar, an annual event held in Campania, Italy, dedicated to jazz education and promotion. On this occasion, he conducted training activities aimed at young musicians from across Italy, contributing to the dissemination of contemporary jazz language in both academic and workshop settings. During the seminar, he also performed in a concert alongside the other faculty members, as part of the event’s official program.

== Discography ==
=== As leader ===
- Alone (NYC, 1995)
- Four's and Two's (NYC, 1996)
- Demetrio's Dream (Nel Jazz, 1996)
- Moodiology (NYC, 1999)
- The Fringe in New York (NYC, 2000)
- Onetwothreefour (Stunt, 2006)
- Night of My Beloved (Venus, 2008)
- Among Friends (Stunt, 2009)
- Filing the Profile (Intuition, 2011)
- Audacity (Challenge, 2012)
- Quintonic (Stunt, 2014)
- 3 Nights in L.A. (Fuzzy Music, 2019) – live
- Themes for Good Friends (JoJo, 2026)

As leader of The Fringe

- The Fringe (Ap-Gu-Ga, 1978)
- Live ! (Ap-Gu-Ga, 1980) – live
- Hey, Open Up! (Ap-Gu-Ga, 1982)
- The Raging Bulls (Ap-Gu-Ga, 1986)
- The Return of the Neanderthal Man (Northeastern, 1990)
- It's Time for the Fringe (Soul Note, 1993)
- Live in Israel (Soul Note, 1997) – live
- Live in Iseo (Soul Note, 2001) – live

=== As sideman ===
With Ben Besiakov

- Aviation (Stunt, 2000)
- Hey Why Don't We Play (Stunt, 2002)

With Joe Lovano

- 52nd Street Themes (Blue Note, 2000)
- On This Day ... Live at The Vanguard (Blue Note, 2003)
- Streams of Expression (Blue Note, 2006)

With George Russell

- The African Game (Blue Note, 1985)
- So What (Blue Note, 1986)

With George Schuller

- Lookin' Up from Down Below (GM, 1989)
- Tenor Tantrums (New World, 1999)

With others

- Steve Smith, Time Flies (Drum Legacy, 2023)
- Jeff Rupert, The Ripple (Rupe Media, 2020)
- Magnus Bakken, Cycles (AMP, 2015)
- Norman David and The Eleventet, At This Time (CoolCraft, 2011)
- Randy Brecker, The Avatar Sessions (Fuzzy Music, 2009)
- Claire Daly, Swing Low (Koch, 1999)
- Aydin Esen, Pictures (Bellaphon, 1989)
- Diego Figueiredo, Broken Bossa (Stunt, 2015)
- Leo Genovese, Seeds (Palmetto, 2013)
- Daniel Humair, Quatre Fois Trois (Label Bleu, 1997)
- Ingrid Jensen, Vernal Fields (Enja, 1995)
- Tom Kennedy, Just Play! (Capri, 2013)
- Brian Landrus, Forward (Cadence, 2009)
- Matthias Lupri, Shadow of the Vibe (Chartmaker, 1999)
- Mike Mainieri, An American Diary (NYC, 1997)
- Bob Moses, Love Everlasting (Amulet, 1999)
- Dejan Terzic, Four For One (Naxos Jazz, 1999)
- Wolfgang Muthspiel, Black & Blue (Amadeo, 1992)
- Jorn Oien, Short Stories (Resonant Music, 2004)
- Orange Then Blue, Live: Where Were You? (GM, 1989)
- Rachel Z, Room of One's Own (NYC, 1996)
- Pete Robbins, Centric (Telepathy, 2001)
- Gunther Schuller, Jumpin' in the Future (GM, 1988)
- Judi Silvano, Cleome Live Takes (JSL, 2008)
- Luciana Souza, An Answer to Your Silence (NYC, 1998)
- Martin Taylor, Kiss and Tell (Columbia, 1999)
- Frank Tiberi, Tiberian Mode (NY Jam, 1999)
