= First Prize (album) =

Studio album by George Gruntz Concert Jazz Band
- Released: 1989
- Recorded: May 7 & 8, 1989
- Studio: Radio DRS Studio 7, Zurich, Switzerland
- Genre: Jazz
- Length: 51:02
- Label: Enja; ENJ 6004
- Producer: Matthias Winckelmann

George Gruntz chronology
Happening Now! (1988)	First Prize (1989)	Serious Fun (1990)

First Prize is an album by pianist and composer George Gruntz's Concert Jazz Band, which was recorded in Switzerland in 1989 and released on Enja Records.

== Reception ==
Professional ratings
Review scores
Source	Rating
Allmusic	4/5 stars

The Allmusic review by Scott Yanow stated "This is a particularly fun outing ... both complex and full of wit and color. ... there is plenty of variety and many brilliant moments. George Gruntz's 18-piece group was one of the finest of the period, and this sometimes-eccentric CD is a perfect introduction to his music".

== Track listing ==
All compositions by George Gruntz except where noted

1. "So Easy" (Larry Schneider) – 8:09
2. "Gorby-Chief" – 11:25
3. "Speaking of Love" – 7:47
4. "Trance-Figurations" (Franco Ambrosetti) – 5:42
5. "Amnesty" – 8:08
6. "E.B.S.B.M.O." (Kenny Wheeler) – 9:18
7. "Band Switch" – 7:18
8. "Fishin' With Gramps" (Ray Anderson) – 5:16

== Personnel ==
- George Gruntz – piano, arranger
- Franco Ambrosetti – trumpet, flugelhorn
- Stanton Davis – trumpet, flugelhorn
- Mike Mossman – trumpet, flugelhorn
- Manfred Schoof – trumpet, flugelhorn
- Marvin Stamm – trumpet, flugelhorn
- Sharon Freeman – French horn
- Tom Varner – French horn
- David Bargeron – euphonium
- Joe Daley – euphonium
- Howard Johnson – tuba, bass clarinet
- Chris Hunter – flute, soprano saxophone, alto saxophone
- Ernst-Ludwig Petrowski – flute, clarinet, soprano saxophone, alto saxophone
- Bob Malach – flute, soprano saxophone, tenor saxophone
- Larry Schneider – soprano saxophone, tenor saxophone
- Vinny Golia – baritone saxophone, bass flute
- Mike Richmond – bass
- Adam Nussbaum – drums
