= The 80th Birthday Concert =

Live album by George Russell & The Living Time Orchestra
- Released: 2005
- Recorded: June 2003
- Genre: Jazz
- Label: Concept
- Producer: George Russell

George Russell chronology
It's About Time (1996)	The 80th Birthday Concert (2005)	Things New (2007)

The 80th Birthday Concert is a two-CD live album by George Russell released on the Concept label in 2005, featuring a performance by Russell with his Living Time Orchestra recorded in 2003.

Despite having been named an NEA Jazz Master, and receiving MacArthur and Guggenheim fellowships, Russell was unable to arrange a United States tour for his ensemble on the occasion of his 80th birthday, and instead presented his celebratory concerts in Europe.

== Reception ==
Professional ratings
Review scores
Source	Rating
AllMusic	3.5/5 stars
The Penguin Guide to Jazz	4/4 stars
The Guardian	4/5 stars
All About Jazz	4/5 stars

In a review for AllMusic, Scott Yanow wrote: "The 80th Birthday Concert... stands as one of [Russell's] finest recordings and sums up much of his career... it is the sound of the passionate ensembles, the very original writing, and the spirit of the musicians and the ageless Russell that makes this a highly recommended set".

The authors of the Penguin Guide to Jazz Recordings awarded the album 4 stars, calling it "an unashamed celebration of some of Russell's greatest works, but also a valuable introduction to one of the most important bodies of work in modern jazz composition."

The Guardian's John Fordham called the album "exuberant", and noted that the music "brought a Barbican crowd to their feet."

Aaron Steinberg, writing for Jazz Times, praised the "strong solos from tenor saxophonist Andy Sheppard, guitarist Mike Walker and electrified trumpeter Palle Mikkelborg" on "Electronic Sonata" and "The African Game", but stated that the two closing works are "more charming."

In a review for All About Jazz, Robert R. Calder awarded the album 4 stars, and commented: "Russell has never been interested in writing music for any specific audience. He's an intellectual and has feelings about all manner of serious issues. He doesn't compartmentalise, because he understands that metaphysics, ecology, boogaloo and technical analysis move together. Imagine a dancing philosopher."

== Track listing ==
All tracks are written by George Russell except as indicated

No.	Title	Writer(s)	Length
1.	"Listen to the Silence"		6:09
2.	"Announcement"		0:27
3.	"Electronic Sonata for Souls Loved by Nature"		28:52
4.	"The African Game"		40:45
5.	"It's About Time"		12:22
6.	"So What"	Miles Davis	17:36

== Personnel ==
- George Russell – conductor, arranger
- Stuart Brooks, Stanton Davis, Palle Mikkelborg – trumpet
- Dave Bargeron – trombone
- Richard Henry – bass trombone
- Chris Biscoe – alto saxophone
- Andy Sheppard – tenor saxophone
- Pete Hurt – baritone saxophone, bass clarinet
- Hiro Honshuku – flute, electronics
- Brad Hatfield, Steve Lodder – keyboards
- Bill Urmson – Fender bass
- Mike Walker – guitar
- Richie Morales – drums
- Pat Hollenbeck – percussion
