= The Stratus Seekers =

Studio album by George Russell
- Released: May or June 1962
- Recorded: January 31, 1962
- Genre: Jazz
- Length: 45:12
- Label: Riverside
- Producer: Orrin Keepnews

George Russell chronology
Ezz-thetics (1961)	The Stratus Seekers (1962)	The Outer View (1962)

Professional ratings
Review scores
Source	Rating
Allmusic	4.5/5 stars
Down Beat	4/5 stars
The Penguin Guide to Jazz Recordings	3.5/4 stars

The Stratus Seekers is an album by George Russell released in May or June 1962 on Riverside Records. The album contains performances by Russell with John Pierce, David Baker, Paul Plummer, Don Ellis, Steve Swallow and Joe Hunt.

== Reception ==
In his review in the August 16, 1962 of Down Beat magazine Harvey Pekar says this of Russell: "His work abounds with such devices as polyphony, polytonality, and changing tempos and time signatures. He is also a brilliant orchestrator... producing constantly varying sonorities and textures." A retrospective Allmusic review by Scott Yanow states that "The music has its own logic, is somewhat difficult to classify, yet deserves further attention by jazz historians and analysts".

== Track listing ==
All compositions by George Russell except where noted.

1. "Pan-Daddy" - 4:57
2. "The Stratus Seekers" - 6:52
3. "The Stratus Seekers" [alternate take] - 7:44 Bonus track on CD reissue
4. "Kige's Tune" (Al Kiger) - 5:46
5. "Blues in Orbit" - 7:24
6. "A Lonely Place" - 7:18
7. "Stereophrenic" (David Baker) - 5:11

- Recorded January 31, 1962 in NYC

== Personnel ==
- George Russell: piano, arranger, conductor
- Don Ellis: trumpet
- David Baker: trombone
- Paul Plummer: tenor saxophone
- John Pierce: alto saxophone
- Steve Swallow: bass
- Joe Hunt: drums
