= The Jazz Workshop =

Studio album by George Russell
- Released: 1957
- Recorded: March 31, October 17 & December 21, 1956
- Genre: Cool jazz, modal jazz, post-bop
- Length: 42:29
- Label: RCA Victor

George Russell chronology
The Jazz Workshop (1957)	New York, N.Y. (1959)

Professional ratings
Review scores
Source	Rating
Allmusic	4.5/5 stars
The Penguin Guide to Jazz	4/4 stars

The Jazz Workshop is the debut album by jazz composer George Russell, featuring his "Smalltet", which included Art Farmer, Hal McKusick, Barry Galbraith, and Bill Evans.

== Music ==
"Concerto for Billy the Kid" is a feature for pianist Evans, who starts with two-handed octaves that follow the score, before improvising on the changes of "I'll Remember April". "Ezz-Thetic" is a bop theme using the changes of "Love for Sale".

== Reception ==
The Allmusic review by Scott Yanow awarded the album 4½ stars and asserted: "Listening to the music, it is hard to believe that Russell only utilized a sextet... The ensembles are frequently dense, the harmonies quite original and there are often several events occurring at the same time; one would swear there were at least four or five horns being heard in spots... Russell was able to utilize some of the more versatile and technically skilled players of the era, several of whom worked regularly in the studios. Recommended". The Penguin Guide to Jazz gave it a maximum four-star rating and included it in the recommended Core Collection of jazz albums, describing it as "an astonishing collection, including several pieces that stand as almost unique avenues of thought in the jazz language".

== Track listing ==
All compositions by George Russell

1. "Ye Hypocrite, Ye Beelzebub" – 3:53
2. "Jack's Blues" – 3:47
3. "Livingstone I Presume" – 3:28
4. "Ezz-Thetic" – 5:16
5. "Night Sound" – 3:58
6. "Round Johnny Rondo" – 3:31
7. "Fellow Delegates" – 5:42
8. "Witch Hunt" – 3:50
9. "The Sad Sergeant" – 3:27
10. "Knights of the Steamtable" – 2:36
11. "Ballad of Hix Blewitt" – 3:18
12. "Concerto for Billy the Kid" – 4:44
13. "Ballad of Hix Blewitt" [alternative take] – 3:45 Bonus track on CD
14. "Concerto for Billy the Kid" [alternative take] – 4:46 Bonus track on CD

== Personnel ==
- George Russell – chromatic drums, arranger
- Art Farmer – trumpet
- Barry Galbraith – guitar
- Hal McKusick – alto saxophone and flute
- Milt Hinton – bass (tracks 1–6, 8, 12, 14)
- Teddy Kotick – bass (tracks 7, 9–11, 13)
- Bill Evans – piano
- Joe Harris – drums (tracks 1–4)
- Paul Motian – drums (tracks 5, 6, 8, 12, 14)
- Osie Johnson – drums (tracks 7, 9–11, 13)
