= Serious Fun (George Gruntz album) =

Live album by George Gruntz Trio
- Released: 1990
- Recorded: September 21–23, 1989
- Venue: Café Atlantis, Basel, Switzerland
- Genre: Jazz
- Length: 51:02
- Label: Enja; ENJ 6038
- Producer: Euromusic Association

George Gruntz chronology
| First Prize (1989) | Serious Fun (1990) | Blues 'n Dues Et Cetera (1992) |

Serious Fun is a live album by pianist and composer George Gruntz which was recorded in Switzerland in 1989 and released on the Enja label the following year.

== Reception ==
Professional ratings
Review scores
| Source | Rating |
|---|---|
| Allmusic | 4/5 stars |

The Allmusic review by Scott Yanow stated "George Gruntz is best known as the leader and arranger of his Concert Jazz Band so this trio date is a real rarity. Gruntz's piano playing, although very much in the tradition, features his own individual voice. ... Gruntz is in excellent form throughout this enjoyable live set".

== Track listing ==
All compositions by George Gruntz except where noted

1. "Capricci Cavallereschi" – 8:31
2. "Autumn Again!" (Joseph Kosma/George Gruntz, Franco Ambrosetti) – 8:49
3. "Death March" – 4:08
4. "Cat-a-Dam" – 11:08
5. "All-Erigic Blues" (Miles Davis/Gruntz) – 9:39
6. "Mike-a-Mouse" – 6:49
7. "Fransco's Delight" – 7:07
8. "So: What Fun???" (Davis/Gruntz) – 8:38

== Personnel ==
- George Gruntz – piano
- Mike Richmond – bass
- Adam Nussbaum – drums
- Franco Ambrosetti – flugelhorn (track 2)
