= David Baker (composer) =

American jazz musician (1931–2016)

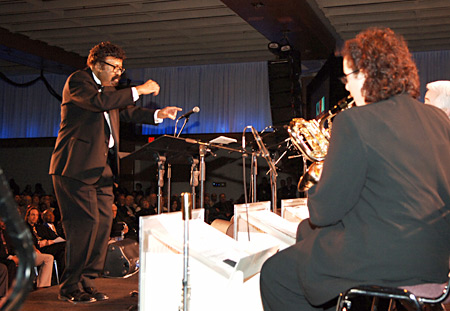
- David Baker (far left) leads the Smithsonian Jazz Masterworks Orchestra during the NEA Jazz Masters awards ceremony and concert in 2008.

Background information
- Born: December 21, 1931; Indianapolis, Indiana, U.S.
- Died: March 26, 2016 (aged 84) Bloomington, Indiana
- Genres: Jazz, classical
- Occupations: Musician, composer, educator, author
- Instruments: Trombone, cello
- Years active: 1950s–2016

David Nathaniel Baker Jr. (December 21, 1931 – March 26, 2016) was an American jazz composer, conductor, and musician from Indianapolis, as well as a professor of jazz studies at the Indiana University Jacobs School of Music. Baker is best known as an educator and founder of the jazz studies program. From 1991 to 2012, he was conductor and musical and artistic director for the Smithsonian Jazz Masterworks Orchestra. He has more than 65 recordings, 70 books, and 400 articles to his credit.

He received the James Smithson Medal from the Smithsonian Institution, an American Jazz Masters Award, a National Association of Jazz Educators Hall of Fame Award, a Sagamore of the Wabash award, and a Governor's Arts Award from the State of Indiana. Baker also held leadership positions in several arts and music associations. The Indiana Historical Society named Baker an Indiana Living Legend in 2001. The John F. Kennedy Center for the Performing Arts named him a Living Jazz Legend in 2007.

== Early life and education ==
David Nathaniel Baker Jr. was born in Indianapolis, Indiana, on December 21, 1931, to Patress Lasley Baker and David N. Baker Sr., a postal carrier. His siblings included two sisters, Shirley and Clela, and a brother, Archie.

Baker attended Indianapolis Public Schools and graduated from Crispus Attucks High School, a segregated public school for African American students. He continued his education at Indiana University in Bloomington, Indiana, where he earned a bachelor's degree in music education in 1953 and a master's degree in music education in 1954. Baker also studied with J. J. Johnson, János Starker, and George Russell and attended the Lenox School of Jazz in Lenox, Massachusetts, from 1959 to 1960 on a scholarship.

== Marriage and family ==
Baker eloped from Missouri, where he began working as a university professor in 1955, to Chicago, Illinois, to marry Eugenia ("Jeanne") Marie Jones. Baker and his first wife, Jeanne, were the parents of a daughter, April. The marriage ended in divorce. Baker had a granddaughter, Kirsten, and a great-grandson, Dylan. Baker's second marriage was to flautist Lida Belt.

== Career ==
Trained as a music educator and trombonist, Baker spent the early part of his career in the 1940s and 1950s as a jazz musician, performing and recording in the United States and in Europe. A facial injury suffered in an automobile accident in 1953 ended his career as a trombonist, but Baker switched to cello and turned his attention to teaching and musical composition. In 1966 he joined the music faculty at Indiana University in Bloomington, where he established the school's jazz studies program. He was later named an IU distinguished professor and chair of the university's Jazz Studies department in the Jacobs School of Music. In addition, he became one of the co-musical directors of the Smithsonian Jazz Masterworks Orchestra in 1991. He composed music, mostly on commission, and wrote hundreds of scholarly works related to music. He was active in numerous musical arts organizations.

=== Early years ===
After earning his master's degree from Indiana in 1954, he began teaching at Lincoln University in Jefferson City, Missouri, in 1955. Lincoln, a historically black institution, had recently begun to admit white students to diversify its student body; however, Baker had to resign from his teaching position after he married Eugenia ("Jeanne") Marie Jones, a white opera singer, due to Missouri's anti-miscegenation laws. One of his students at Lincoln was the composer John Elwood Price. Baker returned to Indiana and taught private music lessons in Indianapolis and performed in local bands. He did not resume his academic teaching career until 1966.

=== Musical performer ===
Baker began performing as a trombonist in Indianapolis during high school and college. He played in clubs along Indiana Avenue, the heart of the city's jazz scene of the late 1940s and early 1950s, with Jimmy Coe, Slide Hampton, J. J. Johnson, and Wes Montgomery. He mentored Freddie Hubbard and Larry Ridley. He later credited the Hampton family, especially noted jazz trombonist Slide Hampton, for mentoring him in his early years. The Hamptons let him and other local musicians rehearse with their family's jazz band at their Indianapolis home.

During the 1950s Baker played in several big bands, including Lionel Hampton's orchestra. After moving to California in 1956, he played with the West Coast jazz orchestras of Stan Kenton and Maynard Ferguson before returning to Indianapolis to lead his jazz band for two years. He performed in clubs across the United States, including the Five Spot Café in New York City with George Russell in the late 1950s. In 1960 he toured Europe as a member of Quincy Jones's band. He also performed in Canada, Japan, Australia, and New Zealand during his more than sixty-year career.

Baker abandoned the trombone after a car accident in 1953 injured his jaw, but he began learning to play the cello in the early 1960s. Although he played trombone on the George Russell Sextet's album Ezz-thetics (1961), after sustaining the injury, Baker switched to cello for Charles Tyler's album, Eastern Man Alone (1967). Baker was also able to play trombone with Russell's orchestra on Living Time (1972), a collaboration with Bill Evans, before the jaw injury finally caused him to give up the trombone and focus on teaching and composition.

Baker is credited on sixty-five recordings, including performances on two of Russell's albums, Stratusphunk (1960) and The Stratus Seekers (1962). Beginning in the 1990s he performed with his second wife, Lida Belt Baker, a classically trained flautist.

=== Music educator and author ===
Although he began as a performer on trombone and cello, Baker is better known for his fifty-year career as a professor of jazz music and for his published works and musical compositions. Because his facial injury in 1953 largely ended the performing aspect of his career, he returned to his home state of Indiana and began a period of increased interest in musical composition and pedagogy.

In 1966 he began teaching at the Jacobs School of Music of Indiana University, where he established a jazz studies program. He was the music school's second African American faculty member and its sole jazz studies instructor for his first ten years at the school. The jazz studies curriculum was approved as a degree program in 1968, a time when only about a dozen American universities taught jazz as an academic discipline.

Baker eventually became an IU Distinguished Professor of Music, serving as chair of the Jazz Studies department from 1968 to 2013 and as an adjunct professor in the African American and African Diaspora Studies department. His work as an educator helped make IU a highly regarded school for students of jazz. His students included Michael Brecker, Randy Brecker, Pharez Whitted, Peter Erskine, Jim Beard, Chris Botti, Shawn Pelton, Jeff Hamilton, and Jamey Aebersold.

Baker was among the first to codify the largely aural tradition of jazz. He is credited with writing 70 books, including several on jazz, such as Jazz Styles & Analysis – Trombone: A History of the Jazz Trombone Via Recorded Solos (1973), Jazz Improvisation ( 1988), and David Baker's Jazz Pedagogy (1989). He is also credited with writing 400 articles.

=== Composer ===
Baker's compositions are often cited as examples of third stream jazz, although they included traditional jazz, chamber music, sonatas, film scores, and symphonic works. He is credited with writing more than 2,000 compositions, including his concerto "Levels" (1973) which received a Pulitzer Prize nomination, and the musical score for the PBS documentary film For Gold and Glory (2003), which won him an Emmy Award.

Baker's best-known composition, which also received significant media attention, was Concertino for Cell Phones and Orchestra, a commission from Chicago Sinfonetta. Baker's other compositions include a tribute to Martin Luther King Jr. in 1968, a violin concerto for Josef Gingold, a flute concerto for James Pellerite, as well as Cello Concerto (1975), which he dedicated to cellist János Starker, and "Ode to Starker" (1999).

He received over 500 commissions from individuals and ensembles, including compositions that he wrote for Gingold, Starker, Ruggiero Ricci, Harvey Phillips, trumpeter David Coleman, the New York Philharmonic, the Saint Paul Chamber Orchestra, the Beaux Arts Trio, the Fisk Jubilee Singers, and the Audubon Quartet, in addition to the Louisville Symphony, Ohio Chamber Orchestra, and the International Horn Society. Other musical groups have recorded his compositions. The Buselli–Wallarab Jazz Orchestra's album Basically Baker (2005) includes interpretations of his compositions, many of them written for big bands and ensembles.

== Later years ==
In 1991, in addition to his work at IU, Baker and Gunther Schuller became the artistic and musical directors of the Smithsonian Jazz Masterworks Orchestra, which was founded in 1990. Five years later Baker became its sole artistic and musical director. He concluded his time with the orchestra in 2012 as maestro emeritus. Among the orchestra's notable performances under Baker's leadership was a concert in Egypt in 2008 when it played at the Cairo Opera House, the Alexandra Opera House, and at the Pyramids.

== Death and legacy ==
Baker died on March 26, 2016, at the age of eighty-four in Bloomington from complications due to Parkinson's disease and Lewy body dementia.

In the 1960s he introduced jazz studies as academic discipline at Indiana University. It was accepted as an academic degree program in 1968, making it one of the earliest to be established in an American university. In addition to chairing IU's Jazz Studies department from 1968 to 2013, he served as musical and artistic director of the Smithsonian Jazz Masterworks Orchestra from 1991 to 2012. In these roles he became a leader and mentor to the next generation of jazz musicians. His range of interests is reflected in the dozens of books and hundreds of articles he wrote, as well as the hundreds of musical compositions, including many that George Russell called "21st-century soul music."

== Awards and honors ==
- Lifetime Achievement Award, Jazz Education Hall of Fame (1994), New Star Award for trombonists (1962), DownBeat magazine
- Emmy Award, score for PBS documentary film, For Gold and Glory (2003)
- Pulitzer Prize nomination, for "Levels" in 1973
- Grammy Award nomination, 1979
- National Association of Jazz Educators Hall of Fame Award (1981)
- Arts Midwest Jazz Masters Award (1990)
- American Jazz Masters Award, National Endowment for the Arts (2000)
- James Smithson Medal, Smithsonian Institution (2002)
- Satchmo Award, Louis Armstrong Educational Foundation (2014)
- Living Jazz Legend, John F. Kennedy Center for the Performing Arts (2007)
- Governor's Arts Award, State of Indiana (1991)
- Indiana Living Legend, Indiana Historical Society (2001)
- Sagamore of the Wabash, State of Indiana, (2011)
- President's Award for Distinguished Teaching (1986) and the President's Medal for Excellence (2102), Indiana University
- Black History Month Living Legend Award (2015), City of Bloomington, Indiana
- David N. Baker Jazz Composition Scholarship, Indiana University (2015)
- Honorary doctorate degrees from Wabash College, Oberlin College (2004), and New England Conservatory of Music (2006)

== Memberships ==
- Former Member, National Council on the Arts
- Former Board member, American Symphony Orchestra League
- Former Board member, Arts Midwest
- Former Board member, Afro-American Bicentennial Hall of Fame/Museum
- Past chairperson, Jazz Advisory Panel to the Kennedy Center
- Former chairperson, Jazz/Folk/Ethnic Panel of the National Endowment for the Arts
- Past president and vice president, International Association for Jazz Education
- Founding president, National Jazz Service Organization
- Senior music consultant for the Smithsonian Institution
- Conductor and musical and artistic director, Smithsonian Jazz Masterworks Orchestra, from 1991 to 2012

== Selected discography ==
- Steppin' Out (Liscio, 1998)
- How to Learn Tunes (2000)

With John Lewis

- The Golden Striker (Atlantic, 1960)

With George Russell

- Jazz in the Space Age (Decca, 1960)
- George Russell Sextet at the Five Spot (Decca, 1960)
- Stratusphunk (Riverside, 1960)
- George Russell Sextet in K.C. (Decca, 1961)
- Ezz-thetics (Riverside, 1961)
- The Stratus Seekers (Riverside, 1962)

== Selected published works ==
Baker wrote more than sixty books, including:

- Jazz Styles & Analysis – Trombone: A History of the Jazz Trombone via Recorded Solos (1973)
- Jazz Improvisation (1988)
- David Baker's Jazz Pedagogy (1989)

He is also credited with authoring 400 articles.

== Selected compositions ==
Orchestra

- Alabama Landscape (1990)
- Alto Saxophone Concerto (1989)
- Concert Piece for Trombone and String Orchestra (1991)
- Concertino for Cellular Phones (2006)
- Concerto for Trumpet, String Orchestra, and Jazz Band (1987)
- Concerto for Two Pianos, Jazz Band, Strings, and Percussion (1976)
- Concertpiece for Viola and Orchestra (1989)
- Homage: Bartok, Bird, Duke (1988)
- Images of Childhood (1990)
- Jazz Suite for Clarinet and Orchestra: Three Ethnic Dances (1993)
- Life Cycles (1988)
- Parallel Planes (1992)
- Piece for Brass Quintet and Orchestra (1988)
- Refractions (1998)
- Shades of Blue (1993)
- Suite from The Masque of the Red Death Ballet (2002)

Jazz Band

- An Evening Thought (1978)
- Concerto for Cello and Jazz Band (1987)
- Concerto for Violin and Jazz Band (1969)
- Honesty (1961)
- Soft Summer Rain (1977)

Vocal

- Give and Take for soprano and chamber ensemble (1975)
- Some Not So Plain Old Blues for Voice and Violin Soli with Mixed Sextet (1989)
- Through this Vale of Tears: In Memoriam: Martin Luther King, Jr. for Tenor or Soprano and Piano Quintet (1986)
- Witness: Six Original Compositions in Spiritual Style for Baritone and Double Bass (1990)

Solo/chamber

- Blues (Deliver My Soul) for violin and piano (1991)
- Clarinet Sonata (1990)
- Concertpiece for Viola, Piano (1989)
- Contrasts for Piano Trio (1976)
- Duo for Clarinet and Cello (1988)
- Ethnic Variations on a Theme of Paganini for Violin, Piano (1982)
- Faces of the Blues for solo alto sax and satb sax quartet (1988)
- Five Short Pieces for Solo Piano (1970)
- Flute Sonata (1989)
- Impressions for 2 Cello (1988)
- Inspiration for Flute, Piano (1987)
- Jazz Dance Suite for Solo Piano (1989)
- Jazz Suite for Violin, Piano (1979)
- Piano Sonata No. 1 (1968)
- Piece for Solo Tuba/ Tuba Quartet (1990)
- Reflections on a Summer's Day for 8 Celli (1986)
- Roots II for Violin, Cello, Piano (1992)
- Singers of Songs, Weavers of Dreams for Cello and Percussion (1981)
- Six Poemes Noir for Flute, Piano (1981)
- Sonata for Cello and Piano (1973)
- Sonata for Solo Cello (1990)
- Sonata for Tuba & String Quartet (unspec.)
- Suite for Unaccompanied Violin (1981)
- Summer Memories for string quartet (1988)
- Theme and Variations for Woodwind Quintet (1971)
- Violin Sonata (1991)
- Woodwind Quintet No. 1 (1971)
- Woodwind Quintet: From "The Black Frontier" (1971)
