= It's About Time (George Russell album) =

Studio album by George Russell
- Released: February 25, 1997
- Recorded: 1996
- Genre: Jazz
- Length: 74:00
- Label: Label Bleu
- Producer: George Russell

George Russell chronology
The London Concert (1989)	It's About Time (1997)	The 80th Birthday Concert (2003)

"It's About Time" is an album recorded under the label "Label Bleu" and features George Russell with his Living Time Orchestra. This album was released on February 25, 1997.

== Tracks ==
1. It's About Time Part I
2. It's About Time Part II
3. Event I See All 4
4. Event II See All 4
5. Event III See All 5
6. Event IV See All 4
7. Event V See All 3
8. Event VI
9. Event VII
10. Event VIII
