= The Outer View =

Album by George Russell

Studio album by George Russell
- Released: 1962
- Recorded: August 27, 1962
- Genre: Jazz
- Length: 50:58
- Label: Riverside
- Producer: Orrin Keepnews

George Russell chronology
The Stratus Seekers (1961)	The Outer View (1962)	George Russell Sextet at Beethoven Hall (1965)

Professional ratings
Review scores
Source	Rating
Allmusic	4.5/5 stars
The Penguin Guide to Jazz Recordings	3/4 stars

The Outer View is an album by George Russell originally released on Riverside in 1962. The album contains performances by Russell with Garnett Brown, Paul Plummer, Don Ellis, Steve Swallow, and Pete La Roca and features the recording debut of vocalist Sheila Jordan on one track. The Allmusic review by Scott Yanow states that "Composer George Russell's early-'60s Riverside recordings are among his most accessible. For this set Russell and his very impressive sextet are challenged by the complex material".

== Track listing ==
All compositions by George Russell except as indicated

1. "Au Privave" (Charlie Parker) – 6:21
2. "Zig-Zag" (Carla Bley) – 4:03
3. "The Outer View" – 10:03
4. "The Outer View" [alternate take] – 9:26 Bonus track on CD reissue
5. "You Are My Sunshine" (Jimmie Davis, Charles Mitchell) – 11:51
6. "D.C. Divertimento" – 9:14

- Recorded August 27, 1962 in NYC

== Personnel ==
- George Russell: piano, arranger, conductor
- Don Ellis: trumpet
- Garnett Brown: trombone
- Paul Plummer: tenor saxophone
- Steve Swallow: bass
- Pete La Roca: drums
- Sheila Jordan: vocals on "You Are My Sunshine"
