= Hal McKusick =

American jazz musician (1924–2012)

Hal McKusick (June 1, 1924 – April 11, 2012) was an American jazz alto saxophonist, clarinetist, and flutist who worked with Boyd Raeburn from 1944 to 1945 and Claude Thornhill from 1948 to 1949.

== Career ==
McKusick was born in Medford, Massachusetts. In the early 1950s he worked with Terry Gibbs and Don Elliott. He recorded albums as a leader, including Triple Exposure (Prestige, 1957). At that time he made many recordings with groups led by George Russell.

In 1958, Hal McKusick led a small group with Bill Evans that recorded Cross Section - Saxes which included contributions from Art Farmer, Paul Chambers, Connie Kay, and Barry Galbraith. For this album, McKusick commissioned arrangements from George Handy, Jimmy Giuffre, George Russell and Ernie Wilkins. He also worked on sessions with Lee Konitz and John Coltrane. In 1960, he starred in the Edward Albee one-act play The Sandbox. In his later years, he taught at the Ross School in East Hampton, New York.

On April 11, 2012, McKusick died of natural causes at the age of 87.

== Discography ==
=== As leader ===
- East Coast Jazz Series No. 8 (Bethlehem, 1955)
- In a Twentieth-Century Drawing Room (RCA Victor, 1956)
- Hal McKusick Quintet Featuring Art Farmer (Coral, 1957)
- Jazz at the Academy (Coral, 1957)
- The Jazz Workshop (RCA Victor, 1957)
- Triple Exposure (Prestige, 1957)
- Cross Section Saxes (Decca, 1958)
- Sax Duets (Music Minus One, 1977)
- 17 Jazz Duets for Two Flutes (Music Minus One, 1977)
- Hal McKusick Plays/Betty St. Claire Sings (Fresh Sound, 1989)

=== As sideman ===
With Don Elliott

- Don Elliott Sings (Bethlehem, 1955)
- Mellophone (Bethlehem, 1955)
- The Mello Sound (Decca, 1958)
- Music for the Sensational Sixties (Design, 1958)
- Love Is a Necessary Evil (Columbia, 1962)

With Elliot Lawrence

- Plays Gerry Mulligan Arrangements (Fantasy, 1956)
- Plays Tiny Kahn and Johnny Mandel Arrangements (Fantasy, 1956)
- Swinging at the Steel Pier (Vogue, 1956)
- Big Band Modern (Jazztone, 1957)

With George Russell

- The Jazz Workshop (RCA Victor, 1957)
- New York, N.Y. (Decca, 1959)
- Jazz in the Space Age (Decca, 1960)

With others

- Manny Albam, The Drum Suite (RCA Victor, 1956)
- Manny Albam, The Jazz Workshop (RCA Victor, 1956)
- Ralph Burns, Ralph Burns Among the JATPs (Norgran, 1955)
- Kenny Burrell, Earthy (Prestige, 1957)
- Al Cohn, Mr. Music (RCA Victor, 1955)
- Bob Dorough, I'll Never Fall in Love Again (Music Minus One, 1970)
- Bob Dorough, A Taste of Honey (Music Minus One, 1972)
- Erroll Garner, Play It Again, Erroll! (Columbia, 1975)
- Terry Gibbs, Swingin' with Terry Gibbs and His Orchestra (EmArcy, 1956)
- Terry Gibbs, Vibes On Velvet (EmArcy/Mercury, 1956)
- Benny Golson, Take a Number from 1 to 10 (Argo, 1961)
- Urbie Green, All About Urbie Green and His Big Band (ABC-Paramount, 1955)
- Urbie Green, The Persuasive Trombone of Urbie Green (Command, 1960)
- Bill Harris, Bill Harris Herd (Norgran, 1956)
- Coleman Hawkins, The Hawk in Hi-Fi (RCA Victor, 1956)
- Milt Hinton, Basses Loaded! (RCA Victor, 1955)
- Andre Hodeir, American Jazzmen Play Andre Hodeir's Essais (Savoy, 1957)
- Osie Johnson, A Bit of the Blues (RCA Victor, 1956)
- Teddi King, Bidin' My Time (RCA Victor, 1956)
- Lee Konitz, Lee Konitz Meets Jimmy Giuffre (Verve, 1959)
- Gene Krupa, Drummer Man (Verve, 1956)
- Gil Melle, Gil's Guests (Prestige, 1956)
- Helen Merrill, The Artistry of Helen Merrill (Mainstream, 1965)
- Jackie Paris, The Song Is Paris (Impulse!, 1962)
- Charlie Parker, The Magnificent Charlie Parker (Clef, 1955)
- Charlie Parker, Jazz Perennial (Verve, 1961)
- Tony Perkins, On a Rainy Afternoon (RCA Victor, 1958)
- Nat Pierce, Kansas City Memories (Coral, 1957)
- Boyd Raeburn, Boyd Meets Stravinski (Savoy, 1955)
- Alvino Rey, Uncollected 1946 (Hindsight, 1978)
- Bobby Scott, Bobby Scott Plays the Music of Leonard Bernstein (Verve, 1959)
- Jack Six, Bacharach Revisited (Music Minus One, 1969)
- Gunther Schuller, Modern Jazz Concert (Columbia, 1958)
- Tommy Shepard, Shepard's Flock (Coral, 1957)
- Dinah Washington, The Swingin' Miss "D" (EmArcy, 1957)
- Dinah Washington, Dinah Washington Sings Fats Waller (Mercury, 1959)
- Phil Woods, Bird Feathers (Prestige, 1957)
- Bob Wilber, Acapulco Princess (Music Minus One, 1972)
- Bob Wilber, No More Blues (MMO Studios, 1972)
