= Clinker (sound artist) =

Canadian sound artist, composer, and visual artist

Clinker (born Gary James Joynes) is a Canadian sound artist, composer, and visual artist from Edmonton, Alberta.

Joynes played as a bassist in prog rock bands before discovering an interest in ambient music. Brian Eno was an early influence. Recent work includes the live cinema piece On the Other Side... (for L. Cohen), commissioned by the 2008 Leonard Cohen International Festival in Edmonton, Alberta as well as the soundtrack for the documentary Dirt.

In 2011 he was a resident artist at Latitude 53 where his work Frequency Painting: 12 Tones was exhibited.
