= Olle Lind =

Swedish musician

Olle Lind is a Swedish jazz trombonist. In the 1970s and 1980s, Lind led such ensembles as Regionmusiken Gotland and Visby Big Band.
