= Lennart Åberg =

Swedish jazz musician and composer (1942–2021)

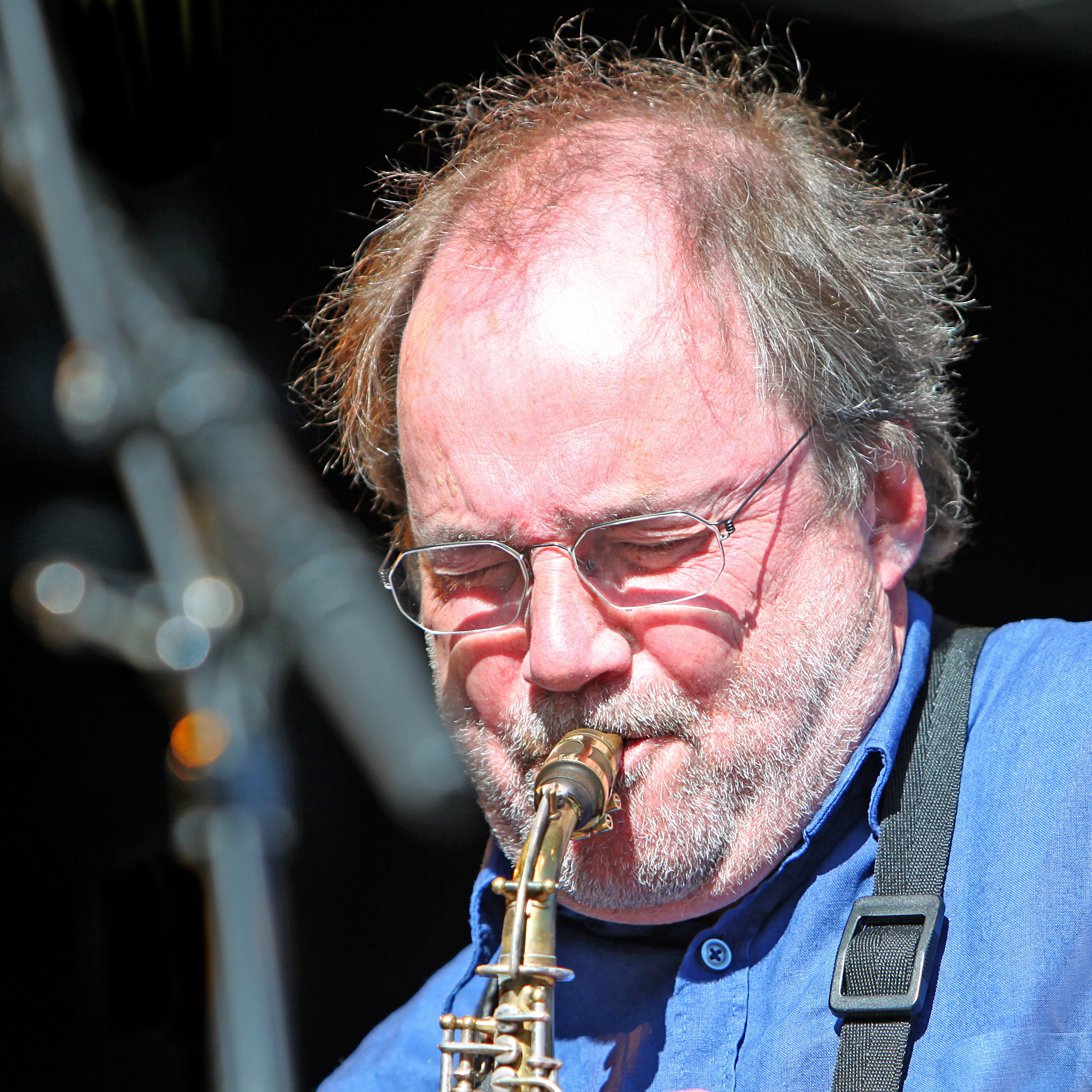
- Åberg in 2009

Background information
- Born: 26 February 1942
- Died: 30 September 2021 (aged 79); Helsingborg, Sweden
- Genres: Jazz
- Instrument: Saxophone
- Formerly of: Rena Rama

Lennart Åberg (26 February 1942 – 30 September 2021) was a Swedish jazz saxophonist and composer. In 1972, he founded Rena Rama, a Swedish jazz fusion group. He also taught jazz history at the Royal College of Music, Stockholm. He was a member of composer George Russell's ensemble in the 1980s along with Jon Christensen, Arild Andersen, and Jan Garbarek, appearing on The Essence of George Russell (Soul Note 1983). In 2002, he received the Djangodor in the Contemporary Star of Jazz category. In addition to jazz, Aberg also worked in musical styles from India, Africa, and Eastern Europe, as well as contemporary music.

== Discography ==
- Partial Solar Eclipse (Japo, 1977)
- Green Prints (Caprice, 1988)
- Seven Pieces (Phono Suecia, 2000)
- Bobo Stenson/Lennart Åberg (Amigo, 2003) – with Bobo Stenson
- Free Spirit with Peter Erskine (Amigo, 2006)
- Up North (Caprice, 2007)
