= George Russell Sextet at Beethoven Hall =

Live album by George Russell
- Released: 1965
- Recorded: August 31, 1965
- Genre: Jazz
- Length: 73:27
- Label: MPS
- Producer: Joachim-Ernst Berendt

George Russell chronology
| The Outer View (1962) | George Russell Sextet at Beethoven Hall (1965) | The Essence of George Russell (1966) |

Volume II cover

Professional ratings
Review scores
| Source | Rating |
|---|---|
| Allmusic | 4/5 stars |

George Russell Sextet at Beethoven Hall (also released as At Beethoven Hall - Complete Recordings) is a 1965 live album by George Russell originally released in two volumes on the MPS label and featuring a performance by Russell with Don Cherry, Bertil Lövgren, Brian Trentham, Ray Pitts, Cameron Brown, and Albert Heath.

== Reception ==
The Allmusic review by Scott Yanow states "This intriguing double LP was innovative composer George Russell's first recording after breaking up his young combo of the early '60s... Most unusual is a suite dedicated to Russell's Lydian concept that includes abstract versions of "Bags' Groove," "Confirmation" and "'Round Midnight".

== Track listing ==
All compositions by George Russell except as indicated

1. "Freein' Up" - 12:50
2. "Lydia and Her Friends" - 6:59
3. "Lydia in Bags Groove" (Milt Jackson) - 5:16
4. "Lydia's Confirmation" (Charlie Parker) - 7:17
5. "Lydia 'Round Midnight" (Thelonious Monk) - 3:42
6. "Takin' Lydia Home" - 2:30
7. "You Are My Sunshine" (Jimmie Davis, Charles Mitchell) - 10:56
8. "Oh Jazz, Po Jazz" - 5:36
9. "Oh Jazz, Po Jazz (continued)" - 5:54
10. "Volupte" - 12:12

- Recorded at the Beethoven Hall in Stuttgart, Germany, August 31, 1965.

== Personnel ==
- George Russell - piano
- Don Cherry - cornet
- Bertil Lövgren - trumpet
- Brian Trentham - trombone
- Ray Pitts - tenor saxophone
- Cameron Brown - bass
- Albert Heath - drums
