= George Russell (composer) =

American jazz pianist, composer, and theorist (1923–2009)

Background information
- Born: George Allen Russell; June 23, 1923; Cincinnati, Ohio, U.S.
- Died: July 27, 2009 (aged 86) Boston, Massachusetts, U.S.
- Genres: Jazz
- Occupations: Musician, composer, arranger
- Instruments: Piano, drums
- Years active: 1947–2009
- Website: www.georgerussell.com

George Allen Russell (June 23, 1923 – July 27, 2009) was an American jazz pianist, composer, arranger and theorist. He is considered one of the first jazz musicians to contribute to general music theory with a theory of harmony based on jazz rather than European music, in his book Lydian Chromatic Concept of Tonal Organization (1953).

== Early life ==
Russell was born in Cincinnati, Ohio, on June 23, 1923, to a white father and a black mother. He was adopted by a nurse and a chef on the B & O Railroad, Bessie and Joseph Russell. Young Russell sang in the choir of the African Methodist Episcopal Church and listened to the Kentucky Riverboat music of Fate Marable. He made his stage debut at age seven, singing "Moon Over Miami" with Fats Waller.

Surrounded by the music of the black church and the big bands which played on the Ohio Riverboats, and with a father who was a music educator at Oberlin College, he began playing drums with the Boy Scouts and Bugle Corps, receiving a scholarship to Wilberforce University, where he joined the Collegians, a band noted as a breeding ground for jazz musicians including Ben Webster, Coleman Hawkins, Charles Freeman Lee, Frank Foster, and Benny Carter. Russell served in that band at the same time as another noted jazz composer, Ernie Wilkins. When called up for the draft at the beginning of World War II, he was hospitalized with tuberculosis, during which he was taught the fundamentals of music theory by a fellow patient.

== Early career ==
After his release from the hospital, he played drums with Benny Carter's band, but decided to give up drumming as a vocation after hearing Max Roach, who replaced him in the orchestra. Inspired by hearing Thelonious Monk's "'Round Midnight", Russell moved to New York in the early 1940s, where he became a member of a coterie of young innovators who frequented the apartment of Gil Evans on 14 West 55th Street, a clique which included Miles Davis, Charlie Parker, Gerry Mulligan, and John Lewis, later the music director of the Modern Jazz Quartet.

In 1945–46, Russell was again hospitalized for tuberculosis for 16 months. Forced to turn down work as Charlie Parker's drummer, during that time he worked out the basic tenets of what was to become his Lydian Chromatic Concept of Tonal Organization, a theory encompassing all of equal-tempered music which has been influential well beyond the boundaries of jazz. During this period he also studied composition with Stefan Wolpe. The first edition of his book was self-published by Russell in 1953, while he worked as a sales clerk at Macy's. At that time, his modal ideas were a crucial influence on John Coltrane and Miles Davis on the classic recording Kind of Blue, and served as a beacon for other modernists such as Eric Dolphy and Art Farmer.

While working on the theory, Russell was also applying its principles to composition. His first famous composition was for the Dizzy Gillespie Orchestra, the two-part "Cubano Be, Cubano Bop" (1947), part of that band's pioneering experiments in fusing bebop and Cuban jazz elements. "A Bird in Igor's Yard" (a tribute to both Charlie Parker and Igor Stravinsky) was recorded in a session led by Buddy DeFranco the next year. Also, a lesser known but pivotal work arranged by Russell was recorded in January 1950 by Artie Shaw entitled "Similau" that employed techniques of both the works done for Gillespie and DeFranco.

Russell began playing piano, leading a series of groups which included Bill Evans, Art Farmer, Hal McKusick, Barry Galbraith, Milt Hinton, Paul Motian, and others. Jazz Workshop was his first album as leader, and one where he played relatively little, as opposed to masterminding the events (rather like his colleague Gil Evans).

In 1957, Russell was one of several composers commissioned by Brandeis University to write a piece for their jazz festival. He wrote a suite for orchestra, All About Rosie, which featured Bill Evans among other soloists, and has been cited as one of the few convincing examples of composed polyphony in jazz.

Members of the orchestra on his 1958 extended work, New York, N.Y., included Bill Evans, John Coltrane, Art Farmer, Milt Hinton, Bob Brookmeyer, and Max Roach, among others, and featured wrap-around raps by singer/lyricist Jon Hendricks. Jazz in the Space Age (1960) was an even more ambitious big band album, featuring the unusual dual piano voicings of Bill Evans and Paul Bley. Russell formed his own sextet in which he played piano. Between 1960 and 1963, the Russell Sextet featured musicians like Dave Baker and Steve Swallow and memorable sessions with Eric Dolphy (on Ezz-thetics) and singer Sheila Jordan (their bleak version of "You Are My Sunshine" on The Outer View (1962) is highly regarded).

== Europe ==
In 1964, Russell, who as a half black man was dismayed by race relations in the United States, moved to Scandinavia. He toured Europe with his sextet and lived in Scandinavia for five years, teaching at Lund University. In 1966, he was part of the first Pori Jazz festival. Through the early 1970s, Russell did most of his work in Norway and Sweden. He played there with young musicians who would go on to international fame: guitarist Terje Rypdal, saxophonist Jan Garbarek and drummer Jon Christensen.

This Scandinavian period also provided opportunities to write for larger groupings, and Russell's larger-scale compositions of this time pursue his idea of "vertical form", which he described as "layers or strata of divergent modes of rhythmic behaviour". The Electronic Sonata for Souls Loved by Nature, commissioned by Bosse Broberg of Swedish Radio for the Radio Orchestra, was first recorded in 1968, as an extended work recorded with electronic tape. It continued Russell's continuing exploration of new approaches and new instrumentation.

Russell returned to America in 1969, when Gunther Schuller assumed the presidency of the New England Conservatory of Music in Boston and appointed Russell to teach the Lydian Concept in the newly created jazz studies department, a position he held for many years. As Russell toured with his own groups, he continued to develop the Lydian Concept. He played the Bottom Line, Newport, Wolftrap, The Village Vanguard, Carnegie Hall, Sweet Basil and more with his 14-member orchestra.

== Later works ==
In the 1970s Russell was commissioned to write and record three major works: Listen to the Silence, a mass for orchestra and chorus for the Norwegian Cultural Fund; Living Time, commissioned by Bill Evans for Columbia Records; and Vertical Form VI for the Swedish Radio.

With Living Time (1972), Russell reunited with Bill Evans to offer a suite of compositions which represent the stages of human life. His Live in an American Time Spiral featured many young New York players who would go on to greatness, including Tom Harrell and Ray Anderson. When he was able to form an orchestra for his 1985 work The African Game, he dubbed it the Living Time Orchestra. This 14-member ensemble toured Europe and the U.S., doing frequent weeks at the Village Vanguard, and was praised by New York magazine as "the most exciting orchestra to hit the city in years."

The work The African Game, a 45-minute opus for 25 musicians, was described by Robert Palmer of The New York Times as "one of the most important new releases of the past several decades" and earned Russell two Grammy nominations in 1985.

Russell wrote 9 extended pieces after 1984, among them: Timeline for symphonic orchestra, jazz orchestra, chorus, klezmer band and soloists, composed for the New England Conservatory's 125th anniversary; a re-orchestration of Living Time for Russell's orchestra and additional musicians, commissioned by the Cité de la Musique in Paris in 1994; and It's About Time, co-commissioned by The Arts Council of England and the Swedish Concert Bureau in 1995.

In 1986, Russell toured with a group of American and British musicians, resulting in The International Living Time Orchestra. He played with Dave Bargeron, Steve Lodder, Tiger Okoshi, Mike Walker, Brad Hatfield, and Andy Sheppard.

== Music theory ==
Russell's Lydian Chromatic Concept of Tonal Organization re-conceptualized the matching of scales with chords. While the conventional approach to the diatonic major scale is founded on the tones of the Ionian major scale in accordance with classical theory (C, D, E, F, G, A, B for the C major scale, etc.) the LCC derives the scales based on the series of fifths stacked from the root tones of chords with a major third. In the key of C, the stacked fifth series includes C, G, D, A, E, B, and F♯, which provide an alternate seven tone division for the C major scale with a raised, or augmented, fourth tone. The resulting scale, with an augmented fourth (F♯) instead of a perfect fourth (F), has more consonance than the conventional Ionian diatonic major scale over chords, avoiding the dissonant half-step from the major third (E). With the conventional major scale, dissonance is avoided by omitting the perfect fourth; by using the Lydian mode with the more consonant augmented fourth, the player or composer gains the tonal freedom that facilitates modal playing over chords with a major third. Lydian major-third chords are specified with a ♯11, which is equivalent to the ♯4 in the scale.

Miles Davis reportedly summarized the LCC succinctly by saying, "F should be where middle C is on the piano" [white notes: F-F = Lydian major, rather than Ionian major = C-C].

The Lydian Chromatic Concept was the first codified original theory to come from jazz. Musicians who assimilated Russell's ideas expanded their harmonic language beyond that of bebop, into the realm of post-bop. Russell's ideas influenced the development of modal jazz, notably in the album Jazz Workshop (1957, with Bill Evans and featuring the "Concerto for Billy the Kid") as well as his writings. Miles Davis also pushed into modal playing with the composition Miles on his 1957 album Milestones. Davis and Evans later collaborated on the 1959 album Kind of Blue, which featured modal composition and playing. John Coltrane explored modal playing for several years after playing on Kind of Blue.

His Lydian Concept has been described as making available resources rather than imposing constraints on musicians. According to the influential 20th century composer Toru Takemitsu, "The Lydian Chromatic Concept is one of the two most splendid books about music; the other is My Musical Language by Messiaen. Though I'm considered a contemporary music composer, if I dare categorize myself as an artist, I've been strongly influenced by the Lydian Concept, which is not simply a musical method—we might call it a philosophy of music, or we might call it poetry."

The major scale probably emerged as the predominating scale of Western music, because within its seven tones lies the most fundamental harmonic progression of the classical era ... thus, the major scale resolves to its tonic major chord. The Lydian scale is the sound of its tonic major chord.

George Russell died of complications from Alzheimer's disease in Boston, Massachusetts, on July 27, 2009, according to his publicist.

== Awards ==
He received a MacArthur Foundation "genius" grant in 1989. In his career, Russell also received the 1990 National Endowment for the Arts American Jazz Master Award, two Guggenheim Fellowships, and the British Jazz Award, among others. He has been elected a Foreign Member of the Royal Swedish Academy of Music, won the Oscar du Disque de Jazz Award, the Guardian Award, the American Music Award, six NEA Music Fellowships and numerous others. He taught throughout the world, and was a guest conductor for German, Italian, Danish, Finnish, Norwegian, and Swedish radio groups.

== Discography ==
=== As leader ===
- The Jazz Workshop (RCA Victor, 1957)
- New York, N.Y. (Decca, 1959)
- George Russell Sextet at the Five Spot (Decca, 1960)
- Jazz in the Space Age (Decca, 1960)
- Stratusphunk (Riverside, 1960)
- Ezz-thetics (Riverside, 1961)
- George Russell Sextet in K.C. (Brunswick, 1961)
- The Outer View (Riverside, 1962)
- The Stratus Seekers (Riverside, 1962)
- George Russell Sextet at Beethoven Hall (SABA, 1965)
- Othello Ballet Suite/Electronic Organ Sonata No. 1 (Flying Dutchman, 1970)
- Electronic Sonata for Souls Loved by Nature (Flying Dutchman, 1971)
- The Esoteric Circle (Flying Dutchman, 1971)
- The Essence of George Russell (Sonet, 1971)
- Living Time (Columbia, 1972)
- Listen to the Silence (Concept, 1973)
- Outer Thoughts (Milestone, 1975)
- Electronic Sonata for Souls Loved By Nature – 1980 (Soul Note, 1980)
- New York Big Band (Soul Note, 1982)
- Trip to Prillarguri (Soul Note, 1982)
- Live in an American Time Spiral (Soul Note, 1983)
- The African Game (Blue Note, 1985)
- So What (Blue Note, 1986)
- New York (Electric Bird, 1988)
- The London Concert (Label Bleu, 1995)
- It's About Time (Label Bleu, 1996)
- The 80th Birthday Concert (Concept, 2005)
- Things New (RLR, 2007)
- George Russell Sextet Live in Breman and Paris 1964 (Gambit, 2008)

=== As sideman ===
- Gil Evans, Svengali (Atlantic, 1973)
- Sheila Jordan, Portrait of Sheila (Blue Note, 1962)
- Lucy Reed, This Is Lucy Reed (Fantasy, 1957)
