= Ketil Bjørnstad discography =

This is the discography of albums recorded by Norwegian pianist Ketil Bjørnstad.

== Studio albums ==
=== 1970s ===
Title	Details	Peak chart positions
Title	Details	NOR
Åpning	Release date: 1973; Label: Phillips	—
Berget det blå	Release date: 1974; Label: Phillips	—
Tredje dag	Release date: 1975; Label: Phillips	—
Lise Madsen, Moses og de andre with Ole Paus	Release date: 1975; Label: Phillips	—
Finnes du noensteds i kveld	Release date: 1976; Label: Phillips	9
Selena	Release date: 1977; Label: Phillips	16
Musikk for en lang natt with Sigmund Groven	Release date: 1977; Label: Phillips	19
Leve Patagonia!	Release date: 1978; Label: Phillips	13
Svart piano	Release date: 1979; Label: Phillips	—
"—" denotes releases that did not chart

=== 1980s ===
Title	Details	Peak chart positions
Title	Details	NOR
Tidevann	Release date: 1980; Label: Phillips	17
30-Årskrigen with Stavangerensemblet	Release date: 1981; Label: Phillips	14
Engler i Sneen	Release date: 1982; Label: Phillips	18
Bjørnstad/Paus/Hamsun with Ole Paus, lyrics by Knut Hamsun	Release date: 1983; Label: Hete Blikk/Slager	—
Aniara feat. Lill Lindfors	Release date: 1983; Label: Slagerfabrikken	—
Mine dager i Paris	Release date: 1984; Label: Hete Blikk/Slager	—
Preludes vol. 1	Release date: 1984; Label: Uniton	—
Preludes vol. 2	Release date: 1985; Label: Uniton, Hermitage (1993 re-release)	—
Natten with Sissel Ingri Andersen	Release date: 1985; Label: Hete Blikk	—
Pianology	Release date: 1987; Label: Hete Blikk/Hermitage	—
Karen Mowat-Suite	Release date: 1988; Label: Hot Club	—
"—" denotes releases that did not chart

=== 1990s ===
Title	Details	Peak chart positions
Title	Details	NOR
The Shadow feat. Randi Stene, poems by John Donne	Release date: 1990; Label: KKV	—
Odyssey	Release date: 1990; Label: KKV	—
Rift, En Rockopera	Release date: 1991; Label: Slager	—
Messe for en Saret Jord ("Mass for a Wounded Earth")	Release date: 1992; Label: KKV	—
Water Stories	Release date: 1993; Label: ECM	—
For den som elsker ("For Those Who Love") with Froydis Armand, lyrics by Stein Mehren	Release date: 1994; Label: KKV	—
The Sea with David Darling, Terje Rypdal, Jon Christensen	Release date: 1995; Label: ECM	32
Haugtussa with Lynni Treekrem, lyrics by Arne Garborg	Release date: 1995; Label: KKV	31
The River with David Darling	Release date: 1996; Label: ECM	—
Reisetid with Eldbjørg Raknes, Kjetil Saunes, Petronella Barker, Henrik Mestad	Release date: September, 1997; Label: Grappa	—
Ett liv with Lill Lindfors, lyrics by Edith Sodergran	Release date: 1998; Label: KKV	—
The Sea II with David Darling, Terje Rypdal, Jon Christensen	Release date: 1998; Label: Grappa/ECM	—
The Rosenborg Tapes, Volume I — New Life (Nytt liv)	Release date: September, 1998; Label: Tylden & Co./Philips	—
The Rosenborg Tapes, Volume II — 20 Variations on the Prelude and Fugue in C-sharp minor by J. S. Bach	Release date: September, 1999; Label: Tylden & Co.	—
Himmelrand \u2013 Tusenarsoratoriet text: Stein Mehrens	Release date: 1999; Label: BMG	—
"—" denotes releases that did not chart

=== 2000s ===
Title	Details	Peak chart positions
Title	Details	NOR
Epigraphs with David Darling	Release date: 2000; Label: ECM	—
Grace	Release date: 2001; Label: EmArcy	—
Old	Release date: 2001; Label: Universal	—
Before the Light	Release date: November, 2001; Label: Universal Music AS	
Kildens Bredd with Ole Paus	Release date: 2002; Label: Universal	31
The Nest feat. Anneli Drecker, lyrics by Harte Crane	Release date: 2003; Label: EmArcy	—
Profeten with Kahlil Gibran and Ole Paus	Release date: 2003; Label:ABC-Media	—
Seafarer's Song	Release date: 2004; Label: Universal Jazz	—
Solskinnsdypet with Kolbein Falkeid	Release date: 4 October 2004; Label: Kirkelig Kulturverksted	—
Floating	Release date: 2005; Label: EmArcy	35
Rainbow Sessions	Release date: 30 October 30, 2006; Label: Universal Jazz	—
Devotions	Release date: 2007; Label: Universal Jazz	—
The Light with Randi Stene and Lars Anders Tomter	Release date: 23 May 2008; Label: ECM	—
"—" denotes releases that did not chart

=== 2010s ===
Title	Details	Peak chart positions
Title	Details	NOR
Remembrance with Tore Brunborg & Jon Christensen	Release date: 12 April 2010; Label: ECM	32
Night Song with Svante Henryson	Release date: 21 January 2011; Label: ECM	—
Vinding's Music - Songs from the Alder Thicket with Norwegian Radio Orchestra, Christian Eggen, Gunilla Süssmann & Jie Zhang	Release date: 27 April 2012; Label: ECM	—
La Notte with Anja Lechner, Andy Sheppard, Eivind Aarset, Arild Andersen & Marilyn Mazur	Release date: 12 April 2013; Label: ECM	—
Sunrise (A Cantata on Texts by Edvard Munch) with Kari Bremnes)	Release date: 18 October 2013; Label: ECM	—
A Passion for John Donne	Release date: 27 October 2014; Label: ECM	—
Bartók/Debussy/Ravel	Release date: 28 August 2015; Label: Grappa	—
Images	Release date: 23 October 2015; Label: Grappa	—
Shimmering	Release date: 23 October 2015; Label: Grappa	—
Frolandia with Ole Paus	Release date: 8 May 2015; Label: Grappa	8
Sanger Om Tilhorighet	Release date: 5 February 2016; Label: Grappa	—
"—" denotes releases that did not chart

== Live albums ==
- Life in Leipzig with Terje Rypdal (ECM, 2008)
- Hvalenes Sang (Oratorium) (Grappa, 2010)

== Compilations/bundles ==
- Tredje dag/Svart piano (Philips, 2 CD re-release 1994)
- Ophelia's Arrival/Pianology/Minotauros, three ballets (Hermitage (1994 re-release) 3 × LPs
- Early Years (Universal, 2000)
- Early Piano Music (Hubro, 19 July 2011) Preludes and Pianology
- Images/ Shimmering (Grappa, 2015)

== Other albums ==
- Och människor ser igen, Lill Lindfors, written and arranged by Bjørnstad (Metronome, 1980)
- La elva leve! (Kolibri, 1980, contributed one track)
- Manniskors makt for Lill Lindfors, lyrics by Edith Sodergran (1985)
- Losrivelse Kari Bremnes, lyrics by Edvard Munch (KKV, 1993)
- Davidsalmer, Anders Wyller, lyrics from the bible (KKV, 1995)
- Sanger fra en Klode for Per Vollestad (Grappa, 1995)
- Salomos Hoysang written for Lill Lindfors & Tommy Nilsson, lyrics from the bible (KKV, 1995)
