= Bendik (disambiguation) =

Bendik (Armenian: Բենդիկ) is a village in the Lori Province of Armenia.

Bendik may also refer to:

- Bendik (given name), a Norwegian given name
- Bendik Singers, a four-member Norwegian vocal group
- Joe Bendik, American professional soccer player

== See also ==
- Bendick (disambiguation)
