= Afric Pepperbird =

Studio album by the Jan Garbarek Quartet
- Released: 1971
- Recorded: 22–23 September 1970
- Studio: Bendiksen Studio; Oslo, Norway
- Genre: Jazz, post-bop, free jazz, progressive jazz
- Length: 40:51
- Label: ECM; ECM 1007 ST
- Producer: Manfred Eicher

Jan Garbarek chronology
Esoteric Circle (1971)	Afric Pepperbird (1971)	Sart (1971)

Professional ratings
Review scores
Source	Rating
AllMusic	4.5/5 stars
The Rolling Stone Jazz Record Guide	3/5 stars
The Penguin Guide to Jazz Recordings	3.5/4 stars

Afric Pepperbird is an album by the Jan Garbarek Quartet, recorded over two days in September 1970 and released on ECM the following year—Garbarek's second album overall, and his first released for the label. The quartet features rhythm section Terje Rypdal, Arild Andersen and Jon Christensen.

== Background ==
Regarding the album's title, author Jan Omdahl reports that Garbarek told Arild Andersen about a reading about a bird in a book "or something", speculating about which "pepperbird" was the inspiration for the title of the song and album.

== Reception ==
The AllMusic review by Brian Olewnick states, "Together with Sart, Tryptikon, and Witchi-Tai-To (as well as a prior recording on Flying Dutchman), this album represents the strongest, most aggressive portion of Garbarek's career, before he succumbed to what became known as the ECM aesthetic. Very highly recommended".

== Track listing ==
All tracks are written by Jan Garbarek, except as noted.

Side I
No.	Title	Writer(s)	Length
1.	"Skarabée"		6:16
2.	"Mah-Jong"	Andersen	1:52
3.	"Beast of Kommodo"		12:23

Side II
No.	Title	Writer(s)	Length
1.	"Blow Away Zone"		8:37
2.	"MYB"	Andersen	1:50
3.	"Concentus"	Andersen	0:50
4.	"Afric Pepperbird"		7:58
5.	"Blupp"	Christensen	1:05
Total length:			40:51

== Personnel ==
=== Jan Garbarek Quartet ===
- Jan Garbarek – tenor and bass saxophones, clarinet, flute, percussion
- Terje Rypdal – guitar, bugle
- Arild Andersen – bass, thumb piano, xylophone
- Jon Christensen – percussion

=== Technical personnel ===
- Manfred Eicher – producer
- Jan Erik Kongshaug – engineer
- B & B Wojirsch – artwork
- Terje Engh – photography
