= Underwear (disambiguation) =

Underwear is the clothes worn next to the skin, usually under other clothes.

Underwear may also refer to:

- "Underwear", a song by JID from his 2017 album The Never Story
- "Underwear", a song by The Magnetic Fields from their 1999 album 69 Love Songs
- "Underwear", a song by Pulp from their 1995 album Different Class
- Underwear (album), by Bobo Stenson, 1971
