= Arild Andersen =

Norwegian jazz bassist (born 1945)

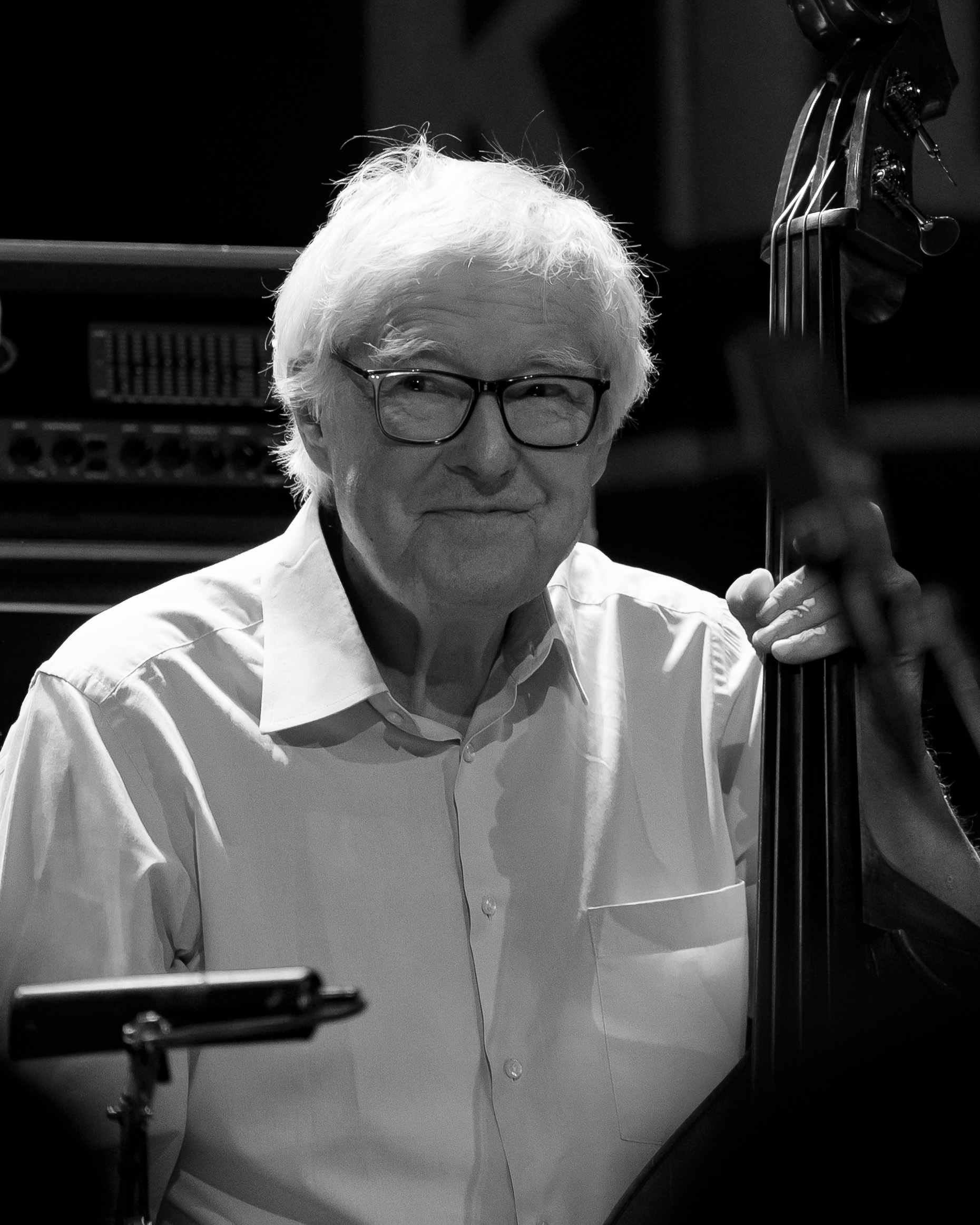
- Andersen in 2025

Background information
- Born: 27 October 1945 (age 80); Strømmen, Akershus, Norway
- Genre: Jazz
- Occupations: Musician, composer
- Instruments: Upright bass, bass guitar
- Years active: 1960s–present
- Label: ECM
- Website: www.arildandersen.com

Arild Andersen (born 27 October 1945) is a Norwegian jazz musician bassist, known as the most famous Norwegian bass player in the international jazz scene.

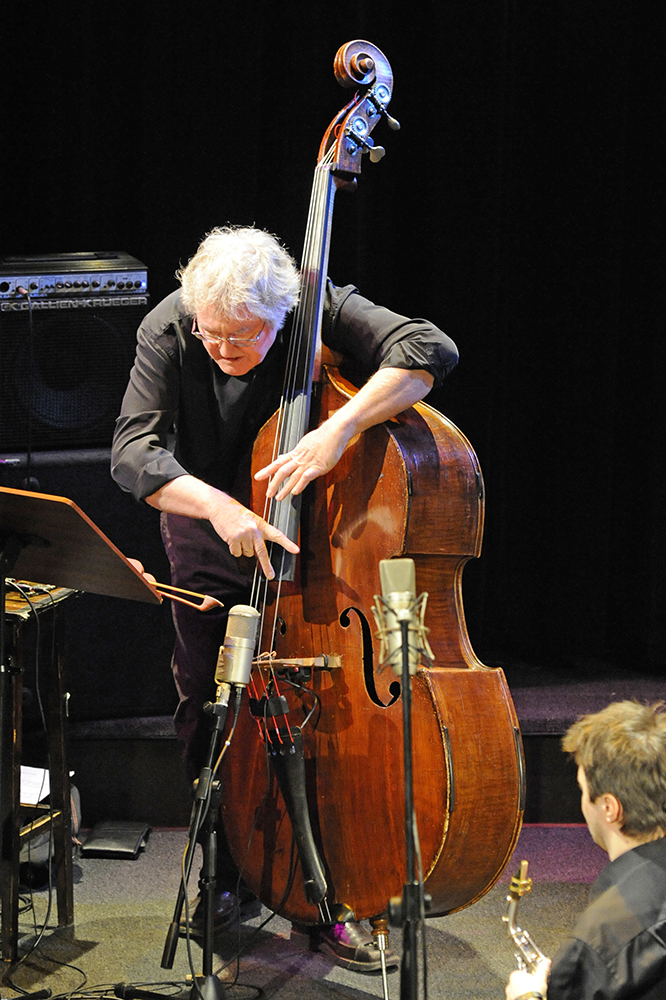
Nor Pol project, concert in Warsaw, Poland - January 2011.

== Career ==
Andersen was born at Strømmen, Norway. He started his musical career as jazz guitarist in the Riverside Swing Group in Lillestrøm (1961–63), started playing double bass in 1964, and soon became part of the core jazz bands in Oslo. He was a member of Roy Hellvin Trio, was in the backing band at Kongsberg Jazz Festival in 1967 and 1968, was elected Best Bassist by Jazznytt in 1967, and started as bass player in the Jan Garbarek Quartet (1967–1973), including Terje Rypdal and Jon Christensen. After completing his technical education in 1968, he became a professional musician and collaborated with Karin Krog, George Russell, and Don Cherry (Berlin 1968), and with visiting American musicians Phil Woods, Dexter Gordon, Bill Frisell, Hampton Hawes, Johnny Griffin, Sonny Rollins, Sheila Jordan, and Chick Corea. During the same period he worked with Ferenc Snétberger and Tomasz Stańko.

In the early 1970s, Andersen collaborated with Norwegian musicians Magni Wentzel, Jon Eberson, Ketil Bjørnstad, and Terje Rypdal, before leaving for an eventful visit to the U.S. in the winter of 1973–1974, and has since 1974 led his own bands, at first a quartet (1974–79). He worked with the Radka Toneff Quintet (1975–81) and has recorded more than a dozen albums as band leader for ECM Records, founded the critically acclaimed band Masqualero, and appeared as side man on a series of recordings. In January 2009, he was named "Musicien Europeen 2008" by the French Academie du Jazz, In 2010, Andersen received the Ella Award at the Oslo Jazzfestival.

In 2022, he recorded a trio album with the American drummer Bob Moses and Slovenian guitarist Samo Salamon entitled Pure and Simple.

== Reception ==
In a review, All About Jazz critic John Kelman said, "Live at Belleville is Andersen's most exciting release to date. Even more, balanced with its lyrical and, at times, near-orchestral tendencies, it's the best disc of Andersen's long and varied career."

== Honors ==
- 1969: Buddyprisen
- 1975: "Bassist of the Year" voted by the European Jazz Federation
- 1983: Spellemannprisen for Masqualero, within the band "Masqualero"
- 1984: Gammleng Award in the class Jazz
- 1986: Spellemannprisen for Bande a Part, within the band "Masqualero"
- 1991: Spellemannprisen for Re-Enter, within the band "Masqualero"
- 2008: "Musicien Europeen 2008" by the French "Academie du Jazz"
- 2010: "Ella Award" at the Oslo Jazzfestival

== Discography ==
=== As leader/co-leader ===
- 1975.02 – Clouds in My Head – ECM Records (1975) Knut Riisnæs, Jon Balke, Pål Thowsen) (2001 – ECM Records)
- 1976.10 – Shimri – ECM Records (1977) (Juhani Aaltonen, Lars Jansson, Pål Thowsen)
- 1978.04 – Green Shading into Blue – ECM Records (1978) (Juhani Aaltonen, Lars Jansson, Pål Thowsen)
- 1980.12 – Lifelines – ECM Records (1981) (Kenny Wheeler, Steve Dobrogosz, Paul Motian)
- 1981.08 – Molde Concert – ECM Records (1982) (John Taylor, Bill Frisell, Alphonse Mouzon)
- 1990 – Sagn – Kirkelig Kulturverksted (1990) (Kirsten Bråten Berg, Bendik Hofseth, Bugge Wesseltoft, Frode Alnæs, Nana Vasconcelos) (2014 – Kirkelig Kulturverksted)
- 1990.10 – Secret Obsession – Nabel (1991) (Uli Beckerhoff, John Abercrombie, John Marshall)
- 1991.03 – If You Look Far Enough – ECM Records (1992) (Ralph Towner, Nana Vasconcelos)
- 1993 – Arv – Kirkelig Kulturverksted (1993) (Kirsten Bråten Berg, Bendik Hofseth, Bugge Wesseltoft, Frode Alnæs, Nana Vasconcelos)
- 1995 – Kristin Lavransdatter – Kirkelig Kulturverksted (1995) (Tore Brunborg, Reidar Skår)
- 1996.12 – Hyperborean – ECM Records (1997) (:Tore Brunborg, Bendik Hofseth, Vassilis Tsabropoulos, John Marshall, Cikada String Quartet)
- 1998 – Sommerbrisen – Kirkelig Kulturverksted (1998) (Frode Alnæs, Stian Carstensen: Frode Alnæs, Stian Carstensen)
- 2003 – Julegløggen – Kirkelig Kulturverksted (2003) (Frode Alnæs, Stian Carstensen: Frode Alnæs, Stian Carstensen)
- 2003.11 – The Triangle – ECM Records (2004) (Vassilis Tsabropoulos, John Marshall)
- 2004.04 – Live at Belleville – ECM Records (2008) (Paolo Vinaccia, Tommy Smith)
- 2005 – Electra – ECM Records (2005) ( Arve Henriksen, Eivind Aarset, Paolo Vinaccia, Patrice Héral, Nils Petter Molvær, Savina Yannatou, Chrysanthi Douzi)
- 2006 – Høstsløv – Kirkelig Kulturverksted (2006) (Frode Alnæs, Stian Carstensen)
- 2006.09 – In House – Dyad Records (2007) (John Etheridge, John Marshall)
- 2011.10 – Celebration – ECM Records (2012) (Scottish National Jazz Orchestra: Tommy Smith)
- 2013.12 – Mira – ECM Records (2014) (Paolo Vinaccia, Tommy Smith)
- 2015.05 – The Rose Window – Deutsche Media Productions (2016) (Helge Lien, Gard Nilssen)
- 2016.09 – In-House Science – ECM Records (2018) (Paolo Vinaccia, Tommy Smith)
- 2021.01 – Affirmation – ECM Records (2022) (Helge Lien, Marius Neset, Håkon Mjåset Johansen)
- 2022 – Across Mountains – O-tone Music (2022) (Markus Stockhausen, Vangelis Katsoulis)

=== As sideman ===
With Don Cherry

- 1968: Eternal Rhythm (MPS)

With Terje Rypdal

- 1971: Terje Rypdal (ECM)

With Bobo Stenson

- 1971: Underwear (ECM)

With Jan Garbarek

- 1969: Esoteric Circle (Flying Dutchman)
- 1970: Afric Pepperbird (ECM)
- 1971: Sart (ECM)
- 1972: Triptykon (ECM)

With Roswell Rudd

- 1974: Flexible Flyer (Arista Freedom)

With George Russell

- 1971: The Essence of George Russell (Sonet)
- 1982: Trip to Prillarguri (Soul Note)
- 1983: Listen to the Silence (Soul Note)

With Pål Thowsen, Jon Christensen & Terje Rypdal

- 1977: No Time for Time (Zarepta)

With Sheila Jordan

- 1977.08 – Sheila – SteepleChase (1978) (Sheila Jordan) (1988, 2021 – SteepleChase)

With David Darling

- 1981: Cycles (ECM)

With Bill Frisell

- 1982: In Line (ECM)

Within Masqualero

- 1983: Masqualero (Odin)
- 1986: Bande a Part (ECM)
- 1988: Aero (ECM)
- 1991: Re-Enter (ECM)

With Vassilis Tsabropoulos

- 1999: Achirana (ECM)

With Markus Stockhausen

- 2000: Kartā (ECM)
- 2002: Joyosa (Enja)
- 2008: Electric Treasures (Aktivraum)

With Carsten Dahl

- 2002: The Sign (Stunt)
- 2003: Moon Water (Stunt)
- 2006: Short Fairytales (EmArcy)
- 2012: Space Is the Place (Storyville)
- 2013: Under the Rainbow (Storyville)

With Ferenc Snétberger & Paolo Vinaccia

- 2004: Nomad (Enja)

With Andy Sheppard

- 2008: Movements in Colour (ECM)

With Chris Dundas

- 2014: Oslo Odyssey (BLM)

With Ketil Bjørnstad

- 1973: Åpning (Philips)
- 1976: Finnes Du Noensteds Ikveld (Kirkelig Kulturverksted)
- 1990: The Shadow (Kirkelig Kulturverksted), feat. Randi Stene, poems by John Donne (1562–1626)
- 1990: Odyssey (Kirkelig Kulturverksted)
- 2004: Grace (Universal), feat. Anneli Drecker
- 2007: Devotions (Universal)
- 2013: La Notte (ECM)

With Yelena Eckemoff

- 2013: Glass Song (L&H Production)
- 2015: Lions (L&H Production)
- 2015: Everblue (L&H Production)
- 2018: Desert (L&H Production)
- 2020: Nocturnal Animals (L&H Production)

With Samo Salamon & Bob Moses

- 2022: Pure and Simple (Samo Records)

== See also ==
- List of jazz bassists

Awards
Preceded by Jan Garbarek	Recipient of the Buddyprisen; 1969	Succeeded by Frode Thingnæs
Preceded by Karin Krog	Recipient of the Jazz Gammleng-prisen; 1984	Succeeded by Egil Kapstad
