= Odyssey (Ketil Bjørnstad album) =

Studio album by Ketil Bjørnstad
- Released: 1990
- Recorded: August 1990
- Genre: Jazz
- Length: 62:58
- Label: Kirkelig Kulturverksted
- Producer: Ketil Bjørnstad

Ketil Bjørnstad chronology
The Shadow; Poems by John Donne (1562–1626) (1990)	Odyssey (1990)	Rift (1994)

Odyssey (released 1990 in Oslo, Norway on the KKV label - FXCD101) is an album by Norwegian pianist Ketil Bjørnstad.

== Reception ==
The Emusic review awarded the album 4 stars.

Professional ratings
Review scores
Source	Rating
Emusic	4/5 stars

== Track listing ==
1. «Land» (5:20)
  Wedding March After Myllarguten
2. «Riva» (4:45)
3. «Odyssey» (13:30)
  Terje Vigen-Suite
4. «Vind» (3:25)
  Sally Garden - Traditional
5. «Molo» (5:25)
6. «Sang» (2:53)
7. «Laguna» (5:07)
8. «Rav» (5:02)
9. «Campo» (3:40)
10. «Akt» (6:05)
11. «1814» (7:08)
  Fugue and Homecoming

== Personnel ==
- Ketil Bjørnstad - piano
- Frode Alnæs - guitar
- Alfred Janson - accordion
- Arild Andersen - bass
- Pål Thowsen - drums

== Credits ==
- All compositions by Ketil Bjørnstad, except «Land» by Ketil Bjørnstad/Myllarguten, and «Vind» by Ketil Bjørnstad/Trad
- Produced by Ketil Bjørnstad
- Recorded & mixed by Jan Erik Kongshaug at Rainbow Studio, Oslo, Norway, August 1990
- Engineer - Jan Erik Kongshaug
- Mastering - The Cutting Room, Stockholm, Sweden
- Photo and Cover Design - Per Fronth
