= Normal cone (convex analysis) =

Cone of outward normals to a convex set at a point

In convex analysis and optimization, the normal cone to a set at a point is a convex cone consisting of vectors that make a non-acute angle with every feasible direction from the point. For a convex set, it is the polar cone of the tangent cone and gives a geometric form of first-order optimality conditions.

== Definition ==
Let $C$ be a convex subset of a finite-dimensional real inner product space $V$, and let $x\in C$. The normal cone to $C$ at $x$ is

$$N_C(x)=\{v\in V:\langle v,y-x\rangle\leq 0\text{ for all }y\in C\}.$$

If $x\notin C$, the normal cone is often defined to be empty. The elements of $N_C(x)$ are called normal vectors to $C$ at $x$. The sign convention above gives outward normals.

If $x$ is an interior point of $C$, then $N_C(x)=\{0\}$. If $C$ is a smooth full-dimensional convex body and $x$ is a boundary point, then $N_C(x)$ is the ray generated by the outward normal vector at $x$.

== Subgradients ==
Normal cones are closely related to subgradients. If $f:V\to\mathbb R\cup\{+\infty\}$ is a proper convex function, then its epigraph
$$\operatorname{epi} f=\{(x,t):t\geq f(x)\}$$
is a convex set. A vector $p\in V$ is a subgradient of $f$ at $x$ if and only if
$$(p,-1)\in N_{\operatorname{epi} f}(x,f(x)).$$

Equivalently,
$$f(y)\geq f(x)+\langle p,y-x\rangle\quad\text{for all }y.$$

=== Sublevel sets ===
Still with $f$ a proper convex function, consider the sublevel set through a point $x$:
$$C=\{y:f(y)\leq f(x)\}.$$
Every subgradient of $f$ at $x$ determines a normal vector to $C$ at $x$. Indeed, if $p\in\partial f(x)$ and $y\in C$, then
$$\langle p,y-x\rangle\leq f(y)-f(x)\leq 0.$$

Under standard regularity hypotheses, for example when $x\in\operatorname{core}(\operatorname{dom} f)$ and $x$ is not a minimizer of $f$, the converse also holds:
$$N_C(x)=\mathbb R_+\,\partial f(x),$$
or equivalently the normal cone to the sublevel set is the closed convex cone generated by the subdifferential.
