= Bendick =

Bendick may refer to:

== People ==
- Marc Bendick Jr. (born 1946), American economist
- Robert Bendick (1917–2008), American television producer

== Places ==
- Bendick Murrell, town in New South Wales, Australia
