= Epigraph =

Epigraph may refer to:

- An inscription, as studied in the archeological sub-discipline of epigraphy
- Epigraph (literature), a phrase, quotation, or poem that is set at the beginning of a document or component
- Epigraph (mathematics), the set of points lying on or above the graph of a function
- Epigraphs (album), an album by Ketil Bjørnstad and David Darling

== See also ==
- Epigram (disambiguation)
