= Life in Leipzig =

Live album by Ketil Bjørnstad & Terje Rypdal
- Released: April 15, 2008
- Recorded: October 14, 2005
- Venue: Leipziger Jazztage
- Genre: Chamber jazz
- Length: 53:53
- Label: ECM; ECM 2052
- Producer: Manfred Eicher

Ketil Bjørnstad chronology
Devotions (2007)	Life in Leipzig (2008)	The Light (2008)

Life in Leipzig is a live album by Norwegian pianist Ketil Bjørnstad and guitarist Terje Rypdal recorded on October 14, 2005 and released on ECM in 2008.

== Reception ==
The AllMusic review by Thom Jurek awarded the album 4½ stars stating "What a contender this record is for one of 2008's finest recordings, and what a solid entry it is in the catalogs of both men."

Professional ratings
Review scores
Source	Rating
AllMusic	4.5/5 stars

== Track listing ==
All compositions by Ketil Bjørnstad except as indicated

1. "The Sea V" (8:01)
2. "The Pleasure Is Mine, I'm Sure" (Terje Rypdal) (5:28)
3. "The Sea II" (7:29)
4. "Flotation and Surroundings" (6:42)
5. "Easy Now" (Terje Rypdal) (4:35)
6. "Notturno (Fragment)" (Edvard Grieg) (1:01)
7. "Alai's Room" (1:38)
8. "By the Fjord" (3:06)
9. "The Sea IX" (5:23)
10. "Le Manfred/Foran Peisen" (Terje Rypdal) (5:10)
11. "The Return Of Per Ulv" (Terje Rypdal) (5:20)

== Personnel ==
- Ketil Bjørnstad – piano
- Terje Rypdal – guitar
  - Recorded live by MDR
