= Remembrance (Ketil Bjørnstad album) =

Studio album by Ketil Bjørnstad
- Released: April 23, 2010
- Recorded: September 2009
- Studio: Rainbow Studio; Oslo, Norway
- Genre: Jazz
- Length: 51:08
- Label: ECM; ECM 2149
- Producer: Manfred Eicher

Ketil Bjørnstad chronology
Life in Leipzig (2009)	Remembrance (2010)	Night Song (2011)

Remembrance is an album by Norwegian pianist and composer Ketil Bjørnstad featuring saxophonist Tore Brunborg and drummer Jon Christensen recorded in September 2009 and released on ECM in April the following year.

== Reception ==
The AllMusic review by Michael G. Nastos awarded the album 3½ stars stating "Remembrance certainly is a reflective, introspective recording, well suited for those times when pause for concern and a look at one's inner self is necessary."

Professional ratings
Review scores
Source	Rating
Allmusic	3.5/5 stars

== Track listing ==
All compositions by Ketil Bjørnstad.

1. "Remembrance I" – 4:56
2. "Remembrance II" – 3:44
3. "Remembrance III" – 5:00
4. "Remembrance IV" – 4:17
5. "Remembrance V" – 4:35
6. "Remembrance VI" – 6:12
7. "Remembrance VII" – 3:54
8. "Remembrance VIII" – 4:58
9. "Remembrance IX" – 4:14
10. "Remembrance X" – 4:45
11. "Remembrance XI" – 4:33

== Personnel ==
- Ketil Bjørnstad – piano
- Tore Brunborg – tenor saxophone
- Jon Christensen – drums
