= Bendik (given name) =

Bendik is a Norwegian masculine given name. Notable people with this name include:

- Bendik Baksaas, Norwegian jazz and electronica musician
- Bendik Brænne, Norwegian producer, artist, and songwriter
- Bendik Bye, Norwegian football player
- Bendik Giske, Norwegian saxophonist and performance artist
- Bendik Hofseth, Norwegian jazz musician
- Bendik Ramsfjell, Norwegian curler
- Bendik Riis, Norwegian artist
- Bendik Rugaas, Norwegian librarian and politician
