= Dansere =

Studio album by the Jan Garbarek–Bobo Stenson Quartet
- Released: 1976
- Recorded: November 1975
- Studio: Talent Studios; Oslo, Norway
- Genre: Jazz
- Length: 38:35
- Label: ECM 1075 ST
- Producer: Manfred Eicher

Jan Garbarek–Bobo Stenson Quartet chronology
Witchi-Tai-To (1974)	Dansere (1976)

Jan Garbarek chronology
Witchi-Tai-To (1974)	Dansere (1976)	Dis (1977)

Bobo Stenson chronology
Witchi-Tai-To (1974)	Dansere (1976)	The Sounds Around the House (1983)

Professional ratings
Review scores
Source	Rating
The Penguin Guide to Jazz Recordings	3.5/4 stars
The Rolling Stone Jazz Record Guide	3/5 stars

Dansere (Norwegian: "Dancers") is the second album credited to the Jan Garbarek–Bobo Stenson Quartet, recorded in November 1975 and released on ECM the following year. The quartet features rhythm section Palle Danielsson and Jon Christensen.

== Track listing ==
All tracks are written by Jan Garbarek unless otherwise noted.

Side I
No.	Title	Length
1.	"Dansere"	15:08
2.	"Svevende"	5:03
Total length:		20:11

Side II
No.	Title	Writer(s)	Length
1.	"Bris"		6:18
2.	"Skrik & Hyl"		1:35
3.	"Lokk"		5:44
4.	"Til Vennene"	Traditional; Garbarek (arr.)	4:47
Total length:			18:24 38:35

== Personnel ==
=== Jan Garbarek–Bobo Stenson Quartet ===
- Jan Garbarek – saxophones
- Bobo Stenson – piano
- Palle Danielsson – bass
- Jon Christensen – drums
