= Seafarer's Song =

Studio album by Ketil Bjørnstad
- Released: 2004
- Recorded: Live at Harstad Kulturhus, Norway, 21 June 2003
- Genre: Jazz
- Length: 79:42
- Label: Emarcy; Universal Music, Norway
- Producer: Ketil Bjørnstad

Ketil Bjørnstad chronology
The Nest (2003)	Seafarer's Song (2004)	Floating (2005)

Seafarer's Song (released 2004 in Oslo, Norway on the label EmArcy – 0602498657775) is an album by the Norwegian pianist Ketil Bjørnstad.

== Reception ==
The Allmusic review awarded the album 4 stars.

Professional ratings
Review scores
Source	Rating
Allmusic	4/5 stars

== Track listing ==
1. «Seafarer's Song» (2:30)
2. «He Struggled to the Surface» (6:27)
3. «Dying To Get To Europe» (3:58)
4. «Orion» (4:48)
5. «Tidal Waves» (6:08)
6. «How Sweet The Moonlight Sleeps Upon This Bank» (3:44)
7. «Navigator» (5:18)
8. «Ung Forelsket Kvinne» (5:41)
9. «The Beach» (3:40)
10. «Her Voice» (5:04)
11. «Dreaming of the North» (5:41)
12. «I Had Been Hungry, All The Years» (2:42)
13. «The Exile's Line» (3:47)
14. «When Police Came They Also Hit Me» (4:13)
15. «Refugees at the Rich Man's Gate» (6:22)
16. «I Many Times Thought Peace Had Come» (3:46)
17. «The Night Is Darkening Round Me» (5:53)

== Personnel ==
- Ketil Bjørnstad – piano & keyboards
- Kristin Asbjørnsen – vocals
- Svante Henryson – cello
- Nils Petter Molvær – trumpet
- Eivind Aarset – guitar
- Bjørn Kjellemyr – double bass
- Per Lindvall – drums

== Notes ==
Recorded live at Harstad Kulturhus, Norway, Saturday 21, June 2003, during the festival «Festspillene i Nord-Norge»
