= Esoteric Circle =

Studio album by Jan Garbarek
- Released: 1971
- Recorded: October 1969
- Studio: Henie-Onstad Kunstsenter, Bærum
- Genre: Jazz
- Length: 45:08
- Label: Flying Dutchman
- Producer: George Russell

Jan Garbarek chronology
Til Vigdis (1967)	Esoteric Circle (1971)	Afric Pepperbird (1971)

Professional ratings
Review scores
Source	Rating
Allmusic	4/5 stars
The Rolling Stone Jazz Record Guide	4/5 stars
The Penguin Guide to Jazz Recordings	3/4 stars

Esoteric Circle is the second album by Norwegian saxophonist Jan Garbarek, originally released under the band name "The Esoteric Circle" on Bob Thiele's Flying Dutchman label but re-issued under his name on the Freedom imprint, performed by Garbarek with Terje Rypdal, Arild Andersen and Jon Christensen.

== Reception ==
The Allmusic review by Brian Olewnick awards the album 4 stars and states, "a highly successful and enjoyable effort, one that can stand comfortably with work being done at that time by Tony Williams or John McLaughlin... Garbarek's own playing, here entirely on tenor, come largely out of Albert Ayler as well as Coltrane, and his general attack is much more raw and aggressive than the style for which he would eventually become more widely known through his recordings for ECM".

== Track listing ==
All compositions by Jan Garbarek.

1. "Traneflight" – 2:51
2. "Ralbalder" – 8:15
3. "Esoteric Circle" – 5:22
4. "Vips" – 5:40
5. "Sas 644" – 8:49
6. "Nefertite" – 2:05
7. "Gee" – 1:10
8. "Karin's Mode" – 7:30
9. "Breeze Ending" – 3:39

== Personnel ==
- Jan Garbarek – tenor saxophone
- Terje Rypdal – guitar
- Arild Andersen – bass
- Jon Christensen – percussion
