= Ferenc Snétberger =

Hungarian jazz guitarist

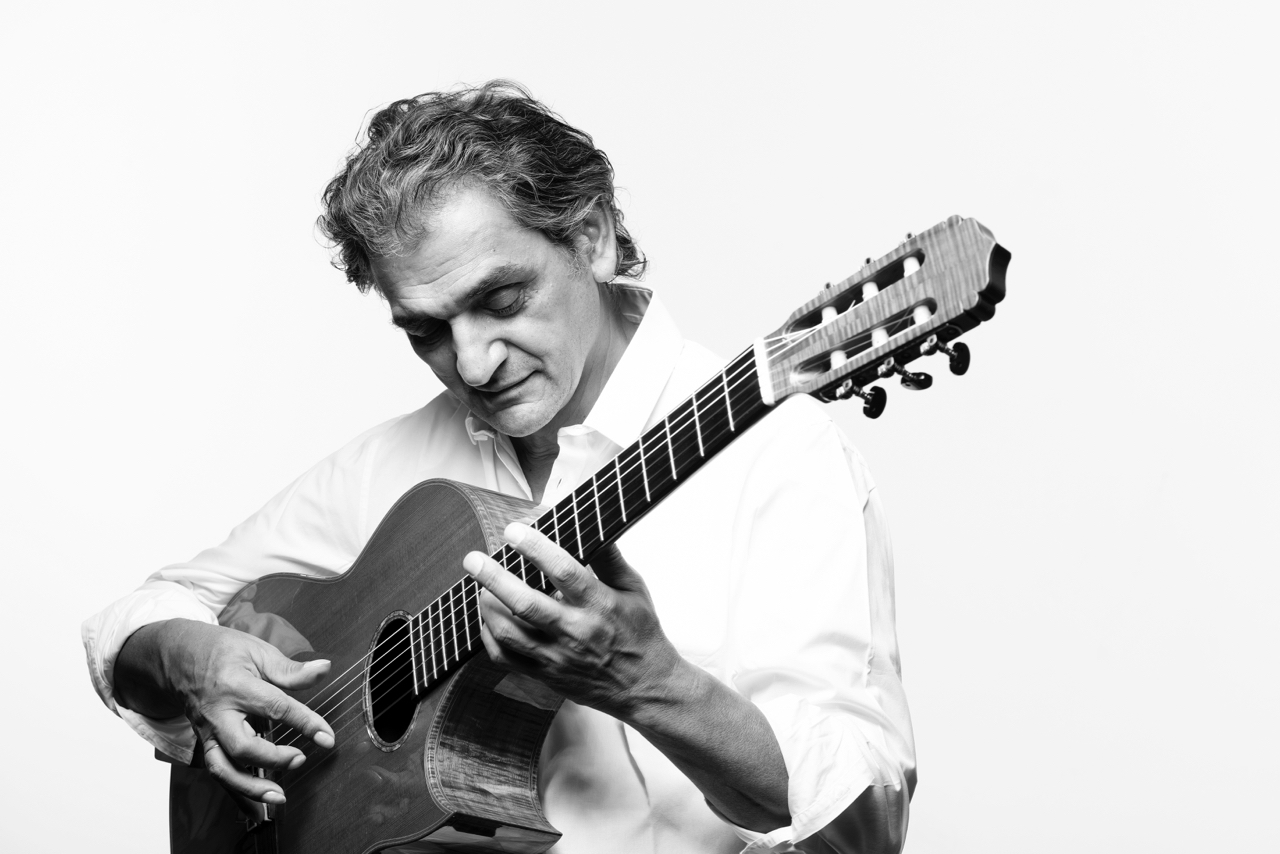

Background information
- Born: February 6, 1957 (age 68); Salgótarján, Hungary
- Genres: Jazz
- Occupation: Musician
- Instrument: Guitar
- Years active: 1980s–present
- Labels: Enja, ECM
- Website: snetberger.com

Ferenc Snétberger (born 6 February 1957) is a Hungarian jazz guitarist.

== Biography ==
Snétberger was born into a Romani family. At the age of thirteen, he attended music school and studied classical guitar. From 1977 to 1981 he studied at Bela Bartók Jazz Conservatory in Budapest.

In 1987, he formed the Stendahl Trio with László Dés and Kornél Horváth, and in 2005 a trio with Arild Andersen and Italian drummer Paolo Vinaccia. He appeared in Joyosa-Kvartetten with German trumpeter Markus Stockhausen, Norwegian bassist Arild Andersen, and Swiss drummer Samuel Rohrer. He has also worked with Joey Baron, Charlie Byrd, Herb Ellis, Richard Bona, Bobby McFerrin, David Friedman, Michel Godard, Anders Jormin, Didier Lockwood, James Moody, and Ernie Wilkins. He has composed film music and "For My People" for guitar and orchestra. His son, Toni Snétberger, is an actor.

On the German Holocaust Remembrance Day (27 January 2011) concluded Snétberger celebration in plenary by the German Bundestag, with a Sinto when Zoni Weisz first held eulogy.

He founded the Snétberger Music Talent Center, an international music school for disadvantaged children and young people, mainly minority of Sinti and Romani origin. The school opened in 2011.

== Honours and awards ==
Ribbon	Name	Year	Notes
-	German Jazz Prize (Deutscher Jazzpreis)	2022	In the category of guitar.
	Cross of the Order of Merit of the Federal Republic of Germany	2020	-
-	Hungarian Heritage Award	2019	-
-	JTI Trier Jazz Award	2018	-
-	Kossuth Prize	2014	Awarded in recognition of his outstanding career as an international musician and composer, for his unique individuality in combining classical and Roma music, flamenco and jazz, and for his dedication to the care of young talent.
	MOB Fair Play Award	2014	-
-	Prima Award	2013	-
	Commander's Cross of the Hungarian Order of Merit	2012	Awarded in recognition of his internationally acclaimed performing arts, his fostering of Roma culture and his multifaceted work in supporting and educating talented Roma youth from disadvantaged backgrounds.
-	Honorary Citizen of Budapest	2010	-
-	Liszt Ferenc Award	2005	
	Knight's Cross of the Order of Merit of the Republic of Hungary	2004 (Returned in 2016)	Awarded for his internationally acclaimed virtuoso performances and his work as a composer expressing the plight of the Roma people.
-	Honorary Citizen of Salgotarján	2002	

== Discography ==
=== As leader ===
- Signature (Enja, 1995)
- Samboa (Sentemo, 1991)
- Bajotambo (Sentemo, 1992)
- The Budapest Concert (Enja, 1996)
- Obsession (Tiptoe, 1998)
- For My People with the Franz Liszt Chamber Orchestra, Budapest (Enja, 2000)
- Balance (Enja, 2002)
- Joyosa with Markus Stockhausen, Arild Andersen, Patrice Heral (Enja, 2004)
- Nomad with Arild Andersen, Paolo Vinaccia (Enja, 2005)
- Streams with Markus Stockhausen (Enja, 2007)
- In Concert (ECM, 2016)
- Titok (ECM, 2017)
- Hallgató (ECM, 2021)
