= Sart (album) =

Studio album by Jan Garbarek
- Released: 1971
- Recorded: 14–15 April 1971
- Studio: Arne Bendiksen Studio; Oslo, Norway
- Genre: Jazz
- Length: 41:52
- Label: ECM 1015 ST
- Producer: Manfred Eicher

Jan Garbarek chronology
| Afric Pepperbird (1970) | Sart (1971) | Triptykon (1973) |

Sart is the third album by Norwegian saxophonist Jan Garbarek, recorded over two days in April 1971 and released on ECM later that year—his second release for the label. The quintet features pianist Bobo Stenson, guitarist Terje Rypdal, and Afric Pepperbird rhythm section Arild Andersen and Jon Christensen.

== Reception ==
Professional ratings
Review scores
| Source | Rating |
|---|---|
| AllMusic | 4/5 stars |
| The Rolling Stone Jazz Record Guide | 3/5 stars |
| The Penguin Guide to Jazz Recordings | 3/4 stars |

The AllMusic review by Brian Olewnick awards the album 4 stars and states, "A strong recording and, along with all of the other early ECM Garbarek releases, recommended for fans who came upon him much later in his career."

== Track listing ==
All tracks are written by Jan Garbarek except where noted.

Side I
| No. | Title | Length |
|---|---|---|
| 1. | "Sart" | 14:45 |
| 2. | "Fountain of Tears, Parts I & II" | 6:04 |
| Total length: | | 20:49 |

Side II
| No. | Title | Writer(s) | Length |
|---|---|---|---|
| 1. | "Song of Space" | | 9:39 |
| 2. | "Close Enough for Jazz" | Andersen | 1:59 |
| 3. | "Irr" | | 7:15 |
| 4. | "Lontano" | Rypdal | 2:10 |
| Total length: | | | 21:03 41:52 |

== Personnel ==
- Jan Garbarek – tenor saxophone, bass saxophone, flute
- Bobo Stenson – piano, electric piano
- Terje Rypdal – guitar
- Arild Andersen – bass
- Jon Christensen – percussion
