= The Sea II =

Studio album by Ketil Bjørnstad / Terje Rypdal / David Darling / Jon Christensen
- Released: February 23, 1998
- Recorded: December 1996
- Studio: Rainbow Studio; Oslo, Norway
- Genre: Chamber jazz; contemporary jazz
- Length: 47:55
- Label: ECM; ECM 1633
- Producer: Manfred Eicher

Ketil Bjørnstad / Terje Rypdal / David Darling / Jon Christensen chronology
The River (1996)	The Sea II (1998)	Ett Liv (1997)

The Sea II is an album by Norwegian pianist Ketil Bjørnstad recorded in December 1996 and released on ECM in February 1998. The quartet, featuring guitarist Terje Rypdal, cellist David Darling and drummer Jon Christensen, previously released The Sea (1995).

== Reception ==
The AllMusic review by Scott Yanow awarded the album 4 stars stating "The general mood is a bit sleepy and the development from song to song is quite slow, although there are a few fiery and rockish solos from guitarist Rypdal. But overall, there is little on this well-played set that rises above the level of stimulating background music."

Professional ratings
Review scores
Source	Rating
AllMusic	4/5 stars

== Track listing ==
All tracks are written by Ketil Bjørnstad except as noted

No.	Title	Writer(s)	Length
1.	"Laila"		5:26
2.	"Outward Bound"		4:52
3.	"Brand"		5:46
4.	"The Mother"		4:24
5.	"Song for a Planet"		4:04
6.	"Consequences"	Christensen; Darling; Bjørnstad; Rypdal	6:28
7.	"Agnes"		4:26
8.	"Mime"		4:22
9.	"December"		3:18
10.	"South"		4:49
Total length:			47:55

== Personnel ==
- Ketil Bjørnstad – piano
- Terje Rypdal – guitar
- David Darling – cello
- Jon Christensen – drums
