= Jon Christensen (musician) =

Norwegian jazz drummer (1943–2020)

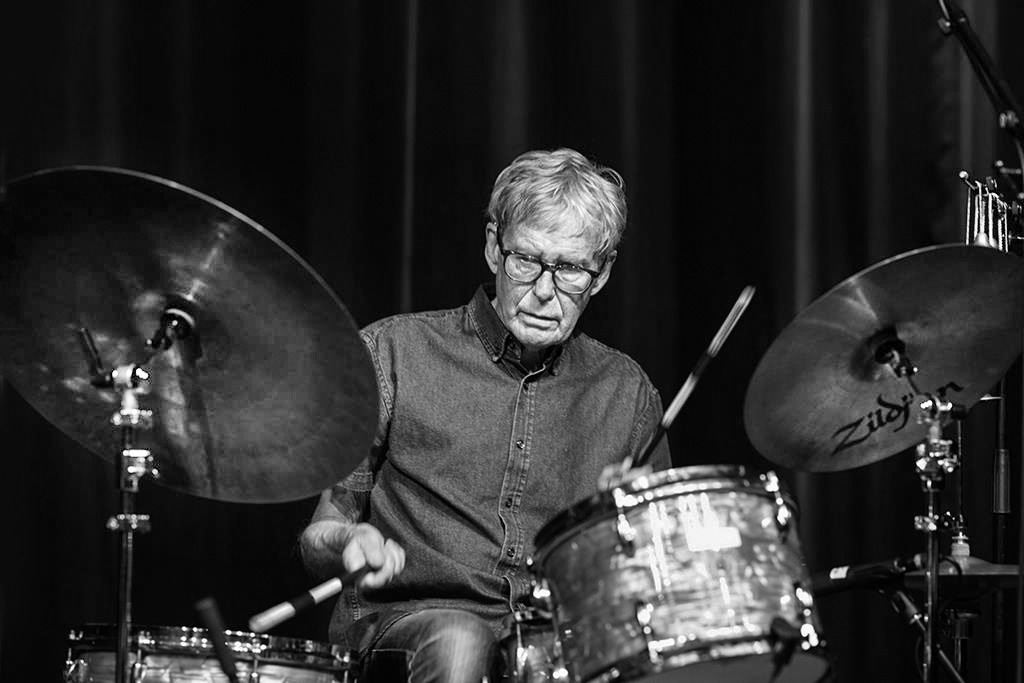
- Playing with Thomas Morgan (b), Jakob Bro (g) and Palle Mikkelborg 2018

Background information
- Born: Jon Ivar Christensen; 20 March 1943; Oslo, Norway
- Died: 17 February 2020 (aged 76) Oslo, Norway
- Genres: Jazz
- Occupations: Musician, composer
- Instrument: Drums

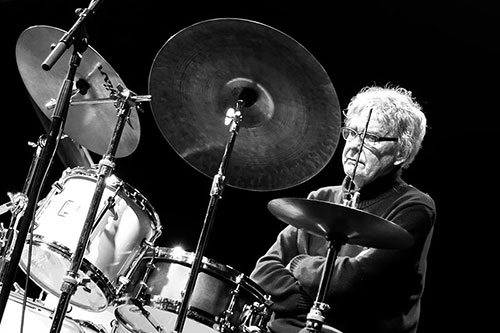
Jon Christensen in Aarhus, Denmark, 2015

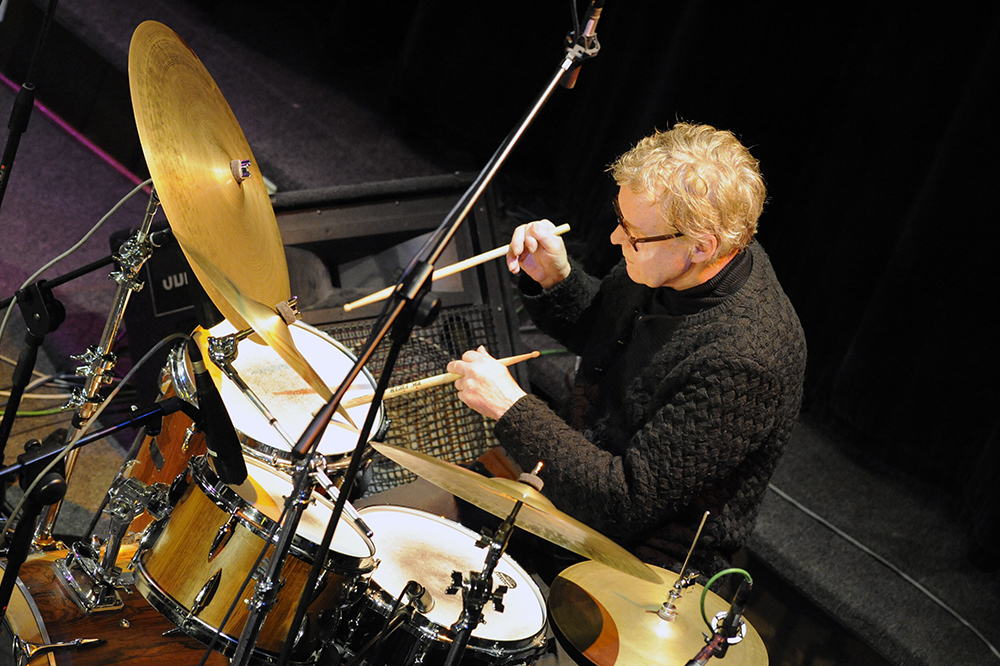
Norwegian-Polish project Nor Pol Bridge in concert at the Polish Radio studio in Warsaw, Poland - January 2011.

Jon Ivar Christensen (20 March 1943 – 18 February 2020) was a Norwegian jazz drummer. He was married to actress, minister, and theater director Ellen Horn, and was the father of singer and actress Emilie Stoesen Christensen.

== Career ==
In the late 1960s, Christensen played alongside Jan Garbarek on several recordings by the composer George Russell. He also was a central participant in the jazz band Masqualero, with Arild Andersen, and they reappeared in 2003 for his 60th anniversary. He appears on many recordings on the ECM label with such artists as Keith Jarrett, Jan Garbarek, Terje Rypdal, Bobo Stenson, Eberhard Weber, Ralph Towner, including the seminal 1975 Solstice, Barre Phillips, Arild Andersen, Enrico Rava, John Abercrombie, Michael Mantler, Miroslav Vitous, Rainer Brüninghaus, Charles Lloyd, Dino Saluzzi Jakob Bro, and Tomasz Stanko. Christensen was a member of the Keith Jarrett "European Quartet" of the 1970s, along with Jan Garbarek and Palle Danielsson, which produced five jazz recordings on ECM Records.

Christensen died on 18 February 2020, at the age of 76.

== Honors ==
- Jazznytt musician poll, 1967
- Buddyprisen, Norwegian Jazz Forum, 1967
- Drummer of the Year, European Jazz Federation, 1975
- Spellemannprisen, 1977
- Spellemannprisen, three times with Masqualero, 1983, 1986 and 1991

== Discography (in selection) ==
=== As leader ===
- 1976: No Time for Time (Pan)

=== As sideman ===
With Yelena Eckemoff

- 2015: Everblue (L&H Production)
- 2020: Nocturnal Animals (L&H Production)

With George Russell

- 1967: The Essence of George Russell (Soul Note)
- 1969: Electronic Sonata for Souls Loved by Nature (Flying Dutchman)
- 1970: Trip to Prillarguri (Soul Note)
- 1971: Listen to the Silence (Soul Note)

With Lee Konitz, Pony Poindexter, Phil Woods and Leo Wright

- 1968: Alto Summit (MPS)

With Steve Kuhn

- 1968: Watch What Happens! (MPS)

With Jan Garbarek

- 1969: Esoteric Circle (Flying Dutchman)
- 1970: Afric Pepperbird (ECM)
- 1971: Sart (ECM)
- 1973: Witchi-Tai-To (ECM)
- 1975: Dansere (ECM)
- 1975: Ingentings Bjeller (Polydor)
- 1978: Photo with Blue Sky, White Cloud, Wires, Windows and a Red Roof (ECM)
- 1980: Paths, Prints (ECM)

With Jakob Bro

- 2015: Gefion (ECM)
- 2018: Returnings (ECM)

With Bobo Stenson

- 1971: Underwear (ECM)
- 1996: Reflections (ECM)
- 1997: War Orphans (ECM)
- 1999: Serenity (ECM)

With Terje Rypdal

- 1971: Terje Rypdal (ECM)
- 1973: What Comes After (ECM)
- 1974: Whenever I Seem to Be Far Away (ECM)
- 1995: Skywards (ECM)
- 2003: Vossabrygg (ECM)

With Ketil Bjørnstad

- 1973: Åpning (Philips)
- 1990: The Shadow (Kirkelig Kulturverksted)
- 1993: Water Stories (ECM)
- 1994: The Sea (ECM)
- 1996: The Sea II (ECM)
- 2009: Remembrance (ECM)

With Keith Jarrett

- 1974: Belonging (ECM)
- 1977: My Song (ECM)
- 1979: Personal Mountains (ECM)
- 1979: Nude Ants (ECM)
- 1979: Sleeper (ECM)

With Ralph Towner

- 1974: Solstice (ECM)
- 1977: Solstice/Sound and Shadows (ECM)
- 1995: Lost and Found (ECM)

With Karin Krog, Steve Kuhn and Steve Swallow

- 1975: We Could Be Flying (Polydor, 1975)

With Eberhard Weber

- 1975: Yellow Fields (ECM, 1975)

With Enrico Rava

- 1975: The Pilgrim and the Stars (ECM, 1975)
- 1976: The Plot (ECM, 1976)

With Radka Toneff Quintet

- 1977: Winter Poem (Zarepta)

With Terje Rypdal and Palle Mikkelborg

- 1977: Waves (ECM)
- 1979: Descendre (ECM)

With Masqualero (Arild Andersen)

- 1983: Masqualero (Odin)
- 1986: Bande a Part (ECM)
- 1988: Aero (ECM)
- 1989: Re-Enter (ECM)

With Blow Out

- 1977: Blow Out (Compendium)

With Miroslav Vitous

- 1979: First Meeting (ECM)
- 1980: Miroslav Vitous Group (ECM)
- 1982: Journey's End (ECM)

With Rainer Brüninghaus

- 1980: Freigeweht (ECM)

With Mike Nock

- 1981: Ondas (ECM)

With John Clark, David Friedman and David Darling

- 1981: Faces (ECM)

With Harry Pepl and Herbert Joos

- 1988: Cracked Mirrors (ECM)

With Lillebjørn Nilsen, Arild Andersen, Eivind Aarset, Jan Erik Kongshaug

- 1988: Sanger (Grappa)

With John Abercrombie

- 1989: Animato (ECM)

With Charles Lloyd

- 1989: Fish Out of Water (ECM)

With L. Shankar

- 1989: M.R.C.S. (ECM)

With Sidsel Endresen

- 1990: So I Write (ECM)

With Knut Riisnæs

- 1992: Knut Riisnæs - Jon Christensen Featuring John Scofield - Palle Danielsson (Odin)

With Anouar Brahem

- 1994: Khomsa (ECM)

With Misha Alperin

- 1996: North Story (ECM)

With Lars Danielsson, David Liebman and Bobo Stenson

- 1997: Live at Visiones (Dragon)

With Tomasz Stańko

- 1997: Litania: Music of Krzysztof Komeda (ECM)
- 1998: From the Green Hill (ECM)

With Dino Saluzzi

- 2002: Senderos (ECM)

With Jacob Young

- Evening Falls (ECM, 2004)
- Sideways (ECM, 2008)

With Carsten Dahl and Arild Andersen

- 2006: Short Fairytales (EmArcy)
- 2012: Space Is the Place (Storyville)

With Carl Petter Opsahl and Tord Gustavsen

- 2008: Love, the Blues (Park Grammofon)

With Ingebrigt Håker Flaten and Håkon Kornstad

- 2011: Mitt Hjerte Altid Vanker – I Live at Oslo Jazzfestival (Compunctio)
- 2011: Mitt Hjerte Altid Vanker – II Live at Uppsala Sacred Music Festival (Compunctio)

Awards
| Preceded by No award in 1966 | Recipient of the Buddyprisen; 1967 | Succeeded by Jan Garbarek |
| Preceded by Bjarne Nerem | Recipient of the Jazz Spellemannprisen; 1977 | Succeeded by Laila Dalseth |
| Preceded by Frode Thingnæs, Henryk Lysiak, Sveinung Hovensjø | Recipient of the Studio Gammleng-prisen; 1984 | Succeeded by Marius Müller, Nils Petter Nyrén, Svein Dag Hauge |
| Preceded by Masqualero | Recipient of the Jazz Spellemannprisen; 1992 | Succeeded by Radka Toneff |
