= Underwear (album) =

Studio album by Bobo Stenson
- Released: 1971
- Recorded: May 18–19, 1971
- Studio: Arne Bendiksen Studio; Vålerengen, Oslo
- Genre: Jazz
- Length: 39:40
- Label: ECM; ECM 1012 ST
- Producer: Manfred Eicher

Bobo Stenson chronology
Underwear (1971)	Witchi-Tai-To (1974)

Underwear is the debut album by Swedish jazz pianist Bobo Stenson, recorded over two days in May 1971 and released on ECM later that year. Stenson's trio features rhythm section Arild Andersen and Jon Christensen.

== Reception ==
Professional ratings
Review scores
Source	Rating
AllMusic	2.5/5 stars

The AllMusic review by Jim Todd states, "This LP from ECM's early days finds Swedish pianist Bobo Stenson leading bassist Arild Andersen and drummer Jon Christensen in a program of uncompromising, collectively improvised post-bop... Although structured as a piano trio, this set's main attraction is the opportunity to hear, up close, the enormous talents of Christensen and Andersen. That, in turn, though, says something about the egalitarian spirit of Stenson."

== Track listing ==
All tracks are written by Bobo Stenson except as indicated

Side I
No.	Title	Length
1.	"Underwear"	7:45
2.	"Luberon"	9:20
3.	"Test"	3:30

Side II
No.	Title	Writer(s)	Length
1.	"Tant W"		8:50
2.	"Untitled"	Ornette Coleman	3:55
3.	"Rudolf"	Andersen	6:10

== Personnel ==
=== Musicians ===
- Bobo Stenson – piano
- Arild Andersen – bass
- Jon Christensen – percussion

=== Technical personnel ===
- Manfred Eicher – producer
- Jan Erik Kongshaug – engineer
- Leena Westerlund – design
