= Ketil Bjørnstad =

Norwegian musician and author

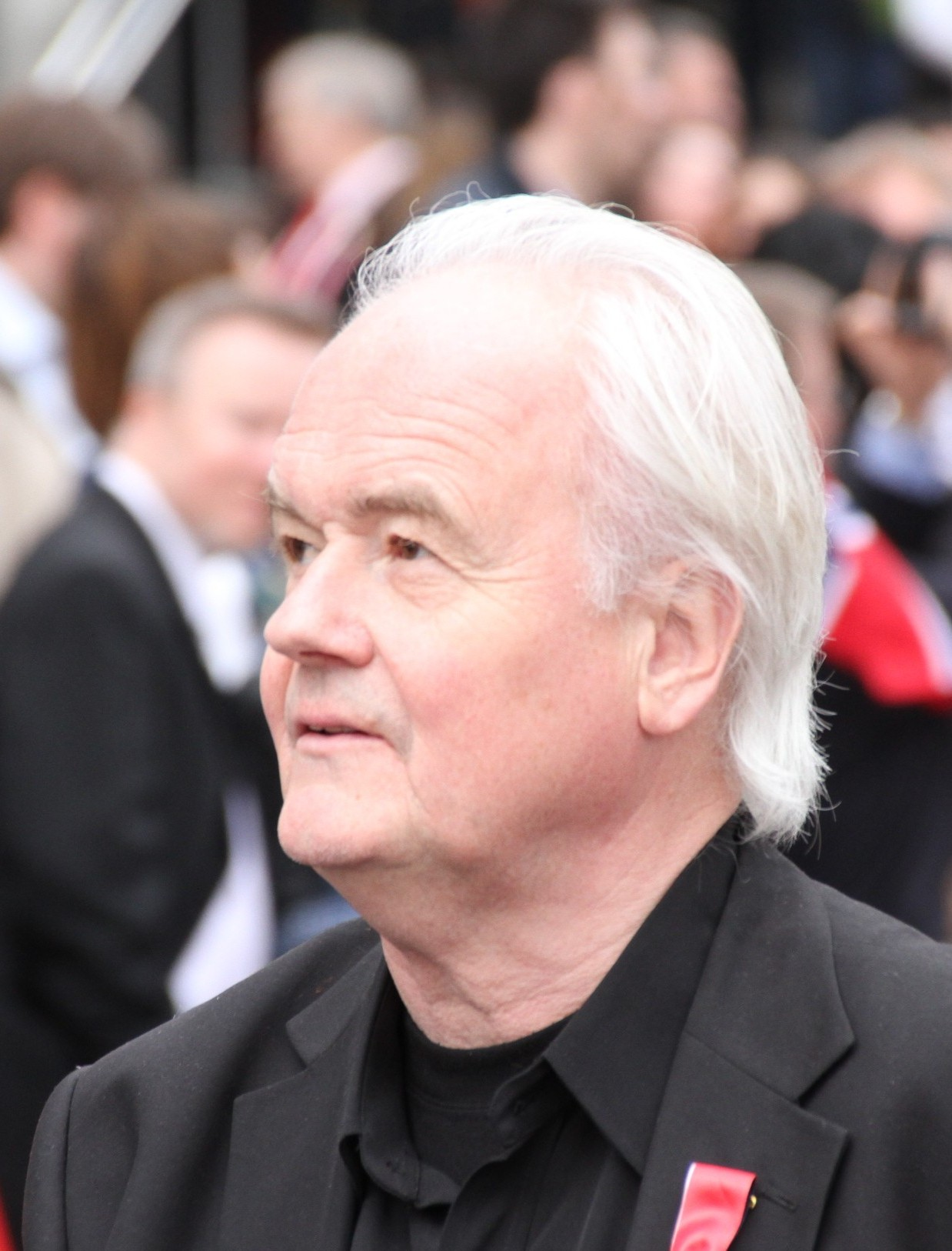
- Ketil Bjørnstad in 2013.

Background information
- Born: Ketil Bjørnstad; 25 April 1952 (age 74); Oslo, Norway
- Genres: Classical, chamber jazz, third stream, folk jazz, new-age
- Occupations: Musician, composer, author
- Instruments: Piano, keyboards
- Labels: ECM, Kirkelig Kulturverksted, Hubro
- Website: ketilbjornstad.com

Ketil Bjørnstad (born 25 April 1952) is a Norwegian pianist, composer and author. Initially trained as a classical pianist, Bjørnstad discovered jazz at an early age and has embraced the emergence of "European jazz".

He is an artist on the ECM record label, but has also published some twenty books, including novels, poetry, and essay collections.

He has collaborated with other ECM artists, including cellists Svante Henryson and David Darling, drummer Jon Christensen, and guitarist Terje Rypdal.

== Biography ==
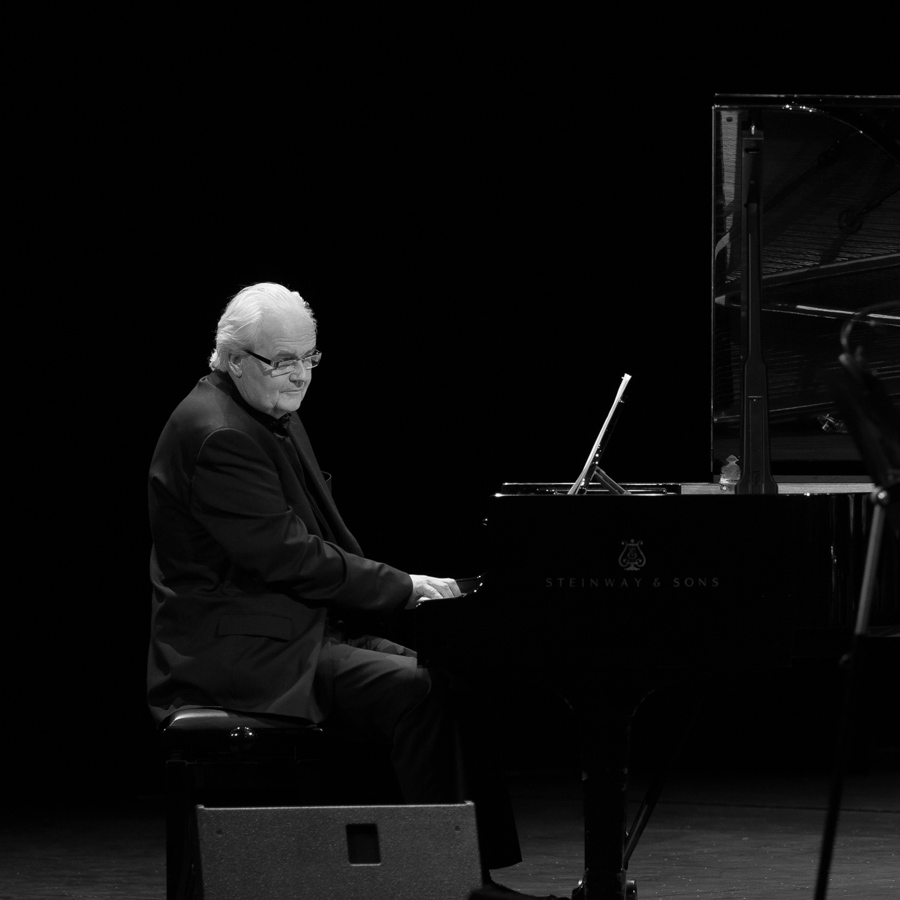
Bjørnstad with Ole Paus at Oslo Jazzfestival (2015).

Ketil Bjørnstad was born in Oslo. He trained as a classical pianist and studied with Amalie Christie and Robert Riefling, and also in London and Paris. He showed great talent at a young age, and won the title of "Youth Piano Master" in 1966 and 1968. When he was 16, he made his debut as a concert pianist with Béla Bartók's third piano concerto.

Bjørnstad subsequently turned towards jazz and rock, in close cooperation with the guitarist Terje Rypdal, bassist Arild Andersen, drummer Jon Christensen and the American cellist David Darling. He has recorded more than 50 albums, for labels which include Universal, Kirkelig Kulturverksted and ECM. He is particularly famous for the work Leve Patagonia (1978), which features Cornelis Vreeswijk and Lill Lindfors. His most famous song is "Sommernatt ved fjorden", sung by Ellen Westberg Andersen. Bjørnstad has released discs with a range of artists including Anneli Drecker, Kristin Asbjørnsen, Kari Bremnes, Lill Lindfors, Randi Stene, Lynni Treekrem, Frøydis Armand, the Stavangerensemblet, Anders Wyller, Per Vollestad and Ole Paus. He is internationally known for his Universal and ECM recordings, including The Sea, duo recordings with David Darling and Terje Rypdal, Grace, with Anneli Drecker, Bendik Hofseth and Trilok Gurtu, Floating with bassist Palle Danielsson and percussionist Marilyn Mazur, which went to the top of the jazz charts in Germany, solo triple album Rainbow Sessions and The Light, with Randi Stene and Lars Anders Land. Gramophone magazine has compared Bjørnstad's songs to those of Leonard Cohen. His ECM-album, Remembrance (2010), adds to his catalogue of his serene, meditative work.

Bjørnstad has worked in recent years with the Swedish cellist Svante Henryson. In 2000 he wrote the millennium oratorio Himmelrand (The edge of the sky), based on texts of the poet Stein Mehren. He wrote commissions for the Molde International Jazz Festival in 2007 and for the Bjørnson Festival in 2008. He also wrote "Coast Lines" for the Canal Street Festival in Arendal in 2007 and "Hvalenes Song" for Vestfold International Festival in 2009. His music has often been used by film directors, including Ken Loach and Jean-Luc Godard. As a pianist he has toured all over the world, and visited jazz festivals including those in Montreal, Shanghai, Taipei, Rome, Nancy, Frankfurt, Leipzig, London, Molde and Kongsberg.

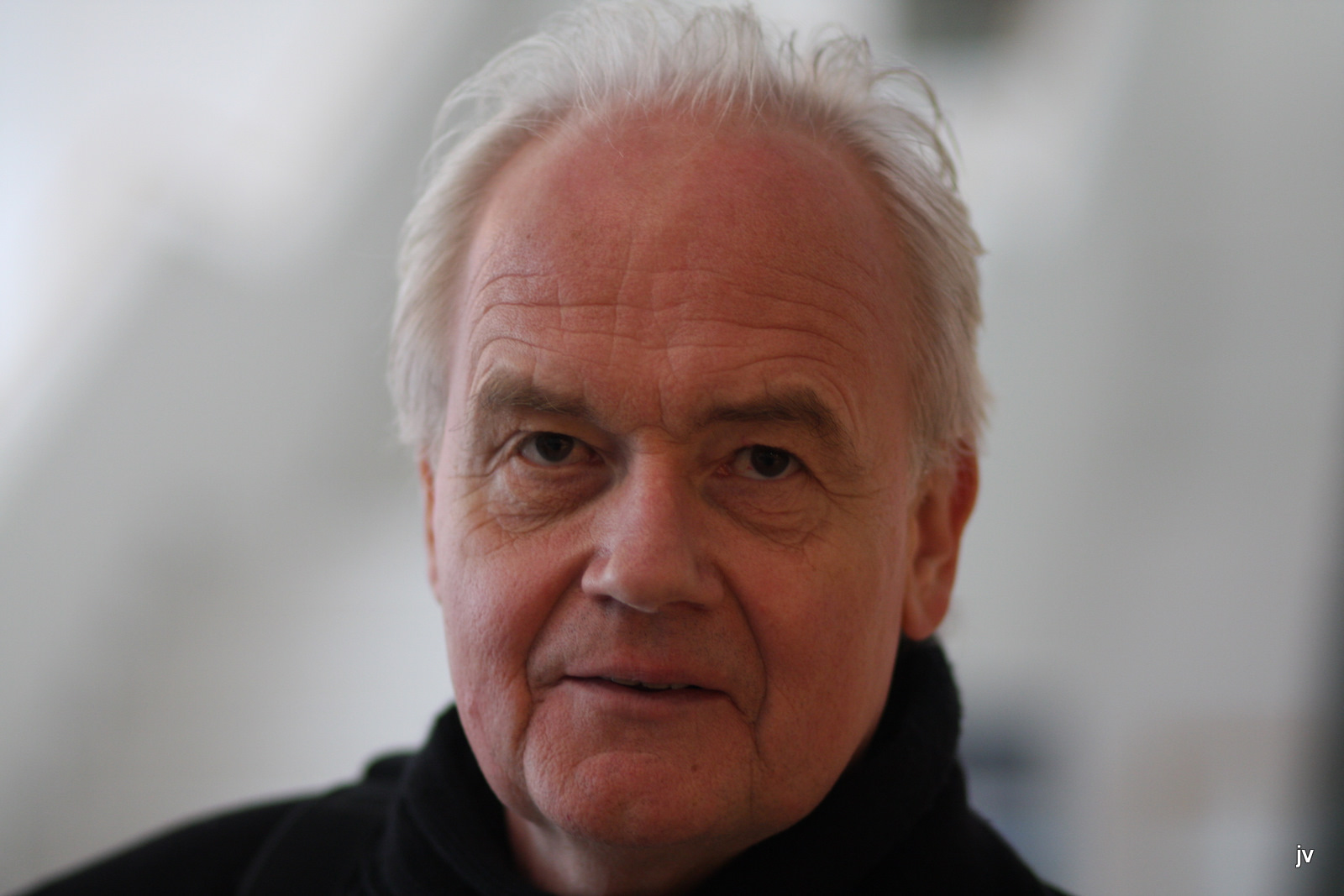
Ketil Bjørnstad in Stavanger, March 2009

Bjørnstad first appeared as an author in 1972 with the poetry collection Alone. He has published about 30 books in all, including poems, novels and biography. Among his earliest novels are Pavane and Bingo – a virtue of Essentials. His novel Oda!, which is based on the life of Oda Krohg is regarded as a reference work on the bohemian scene in Kristiania (Oslo before 1924), and sits alongside his biography of Hans Jæger. A translation of his biographical work The story of Edvard Munch was published in English to coincide with a Munch retrospective exhibition. Among his other literary works are the critically acclaimed Villa Europa and the Victor-Alveberg trilogy, which consists of the novels Drift, Dream of the Sea and Road to Dhaka . Bjørnstad won the Riksmål prize in 1998 with Spiritual. The same year he wrote a satirical book about football, The journey to Gaul with Ole Paus. Mention must also be made of the millennium trilogy which comprises Fall, Ludvig Hassel's Tusenårsskiftet (Ludwig Hassel's Millennium) and Tesman.

Bjørnstad wrote the psychological thrillers The Custom Themes and Twilight. The events of the latter take place in the archipelago of Tvedestrand Municipality, where Bjørnstad lived in the 1970s and 80s. More recently, Bjørnstad wrote an award-winning trilogy about the young pianist Aksel Vinding. It consists of the novels The music, The River and Damen i Dalen (The Lady in the Valley).

Bjørnstad's literary breakthrough in Germany came in 2006 with Vindings Spiel (To the music) published by Suhrkamp / Insel. The influential critic Elke Heidenreich described the novel as "a perfect book" in her Lesen! program for ZDF, and it went straight into the bestseller list of Der Spiegel. The book was also Bjørnstad's literary breakthrough in France, and was awarded the Prix des lecteurs for 2008. To Music was published in English in 2009. In 2010, the novel was longlisted for The Independent Foreign Fiction Prize.

The three novels The Immortals/De Udødelige, End of the World/Verdens Ende and Loneliness/Ensomheten, are comparable to Bjørnstads Millennium-trilogy, where the author discusses the modern mans possibilities in a contemporary setting. In Frankfurter Allgemeine Zeitung, the critic Klaus Birnstiel wrote that The Immortals was "a great novel, not easy to forget".

Master of dreams/Drømmemesteren is a biography about the Norwegian painter Bendik Riis who lived much of his life in different institutions. The Road to Mozart/Veien til Mozart is both a Mozart-biography and a story about the authors childhood in Oslo in the Sixties and Seventies. The book received unison praise by Norwegian critics, and is sold to Suhrkamp/Insel in Germany

On ECM, Bjørnstad has released the albums Life in Leipzig, Remembrance, Night Song, Vindings Music and La Notte. The albums Soloppgang/Sunrise (text by Edvard Munch) and A Passion for John Donne are written for choir and soloists, as well as Sanger om tilhørighet, where Bjørnstad continue his collaboration with the Norwegian singer and saxophone player Håkon Kornstad.

On 3 October 2014. Bjørnstad played for more than 50,000 people, outdoor at the Jarasum International Jazz Festival in Korea, together with Terje Rypdal.

In 2015, Bjørnstad recorded a new album with Ole Paus, called Frolandia. He also launched a new novel, called The Sixties/Sekstitallet, the first of six novels about the decades from the sixties to today. The Seventies/Syttitallet, and then, annually: The Eighties/Åttitallet, The Nineties/Nittitallet, 2000/Tyvetallet and, released in August 2020: The Last Decade/Siste Tiåret. The series has so far sold in total more than 175,000 copies (Aschehoug Forlag). The first books have also been translated into German. In ZDF Matthias Heineman writes that Bjørnstad is "a solid storyteller". In Jyllandsposten Lars-Ole Knippel chose The Nineties/Nittitallet as one of the best book of the year(2018). Verdens Gang writes about The Seventies/Syttitallet (2016):This is truly an adventurous journey. (Guri Hjeltnes)

In recent years, as a musician, Bjørnstad has released a number of solo piano albums, Shimmering and Images from 2015, but also The World I Used To Know (Grappa 2019), recorded in Abbey Road's famous Studio 2 in London. The album was launched at the same time as two sold-out concerts in The Norwegian Opera, which marked Bjørnstad's fiftieth anniversary as a musician. The first concert was also filmed and shown on NRK. Bjørnstad's latest ECM-release is A Suite of Poems with Anneli Drecker and Lars Saabye Christensen. The same year, Grappa released Hun som kjenner tristheten ved ting with Eva Bjerga Haugen, based on lyrics by Kjersti Annesdatter Skomsvold.

In April 2020, Grappa launched The Personal Gallery with violinist Guro Kleven Hagen. Three months later, Lawo launched Lofotoratoriet with Marianne Beate Kielland, and in March 2021, Simax will release a dress rehearsal-recording and DVD of his new opera Flagstad-an Opera, a live performance from The Norwegian Opera in Oslo, November 2020.

== Bibliography ==
- Alene Out (poems, 1972)
- Closer (poems, 1973)
- Nattsvermere (novel, 1974)
- Kråker og krigere (novel, 1975)
- Pavane (novel, 1976)
- Winter Town (novel, 1977)
- The Country on the Other Side (novel, 1979)
- Bingo! or: A Virtue of Necessity (novel, 1983)
- Oda! (documentary novel, 1983)
- The Personal Motive (novel, 1985)
- We Accuse! Treholtsaken and Legal Protection (revised edition, 1986)
- G-moll-balladen (documentary novel, 1986)
- Conversations with Lill (portrait interview, 1986)
- Oppstigning from the Invisible (novel, 1988)
- Storm (novel, 1989)
- Twilight Possibilities (novel, 1990)
- Villa Europa (novel, 1992)
- The Story about Edvard Munch (documentary novel, 1993)
- Euro (novel, 1994)
- Game! Ole Bull and Myllarguten (play in five acts, 1995)
- Blåmann: Music and Lyrics by 20 years (1995)
- Drift (novel, 1996)
- Dream of the Sea (novel, 1996)
- The Road to Dhaka (novel, 1997)
- Spiritual (novel, 1998)
- Fall (novel, 1999)
- Ludvig Hassels Tusenårsskifte (novel, 2000)
- Jæger (biography, 2001)
- The Man Who Walked on Earth (2002)
- Tesmann (2003)
- Days and Nights in Paris (2003)
- To Music (2004)
- Flammeslukeren; Ole Bull – A Life. (2005)
- Liv Ullmann – Life Lines (2005)
- Stories of Vulnerability (with Catharina Jacobsen) (2007)
- The River (2007)
- Kolbein Falkeid – A Close-up (2008)
- Damen i Dalen (novel, 2009)
- De udødelige/The Immortals (novel, 2011)
- Drømmemesteren – Bendik Riis (2011)
- Belonging (2011)
- Verdens Ende/End of the World (novel, 2012)
- Ensomheten/Loneliness (novel, 2013)
- Veien til Mozart/The Road to Mozart (2014)
- The Sixties/Sekstitallet (2015)
- The Seventies/Syttitallet (2016)
- The Eighties/Åttitallet (2017)
- The Nienties/Nittitallet (2018)
- 2000/Tyvetallet (2019)
- The Last Decade/Siste Tiåret (2020)

== Discography ==
- 1973 Apning (Philips)
- 1974 Berget Det Bla (Philips)
- 1975 Tredje Dag (Philips)
- 1976 Finnes Du Noensteds Ikveld (Philips)
- 1977 Selena (Philips)
- 1978 Leve Patagonia (Philips)
- 1979 Svart Piano (Philips)
- 1980 Tidevann (Philips)
- 1982 Engler I Sneen
- 1983 Aniara
- 1984 Preludes Vol. 1 (Uniton)
- 1985 Preludes Vol. 2 (Uniton)
- 1987 Pianology
- 1988 Karen MowatSuite
- 1990 The Shadow (KKV), poems by John Donne, (1562–1626)
- 1993 Water Stories (ECM)
- 1995 The Sea (ECM)
- 1996 The River (ECM)
- 1998 The Sea II (Grappa/ECM)
- 2000 Epigraphs (ECM)
- 2001 Grace (EmArcy), poems by John Donne, 1562–1626
- 2003 The Nest (EmArcy), poems by Hart Crane, 1899–1932
- 2004 Seafarer's Song (Universal Jazz)
- 2006 Floating (EmArcy)
- 2008 Life in Leipzig (ECM)
- 2009 Remembrance (ECM)
- 2011 Night Song (ECM)
- 2013 La Notte (ECM)
- 2013 Sunrise – A Cantata on Texts by Edvard Munch (ECM)
- 2014 A Passion for John Donne (ECM)
- 2015 Images (Grappa)
- 2015 Shimmering (Grappa)
- 2015 Frolandia (Grappa), with Ole Paus
- 2016 Sanger Om Tilhorighet (Grappa)
- 2018 A Suite of Poems (ECM) featuring Anneli Drecker
- 2018 Hun som kjenner tristheten ved ting (Grappa) with Eva Bjerga Haugen
- 2019 Rainbow Sessions/New Edition (Grappa)
- 2019 The World I Used To Know (Grappa) (Also as a 50th Anniversary box-set)
- 2019 The Beginning – And The End (Grappa)
- 2020 The Personal Gallery, with Guro Kleven Hagen
- 2020 Lofotoratoriet, with Marianne Beate Kielland
- 2022 Between Hotels And Time (Grappa), with Anneli Drecker and Lars Saabye Christensen
- 2023 Songs At The Edge Of The Ocean (Grappa), Live at Festiviteten, Haugesund April 27th 2022

== Books ==
- Ketil Bjørnstad. The Story of Edvard Munch, London, UK: Arcadia, 2001. ISBN 1-900850-44-3
- Ketil Bjørnstad. Villa Europa, Oslo, Norway: Aschehoug, 1992 (Norwegian). ISBN 82-03-16872-8

== Awards ==
- Spellemannprisen 1974 in the open class for Berget det blå
- Sarpsborg Prize 1978
- Riksmål Society Literature Prize 1988
- Mads Wiel Nygaard's Endowment 1989
- Gammleng Prize in the open class in 2001
- The French reader prize Le prix des lecteurs for his novel To Music in 2008

Awards
Preceded by Susanne Lundeng	Recipient of the Open class Gammleng-prisen; 2001	Succeeded by Hallvard T. Bjørgum
