= Triptykon (album) =

Studio album by Jan Garbarek
- Released: 1973
- Recorded: 8 November 1972
- Studio: Arne Bendiksen Studio; Oslo, Norway
- Genre: Jazz
- Length: 42:19
- Label: ECM 1029 ST
- Producer: Manfred Eicher

Jan Garbarek chronology
| Sart (1971) | Triptykon (1973) | Red Lanta (1974) |

Professional ratings
Review scores
| Source | Rating |
|---|---|
| AllMusic | 4.5/5 stars |
| The Rolling Stone Jazz Record Guide | 3/5 stars |
| The Penguin Guide to Jazz Recordings | 3.5/4 stars |

Triptykon is the fourth album by Norwegian saxophonist Jan Garbarek, recorded on 8 November 1972 and released on ECM the following year—his third for the label. The trio features rhythm section Arild Andersen and Edward Vesala.

== Reception ==
Jazz historian and Jazzwise journalist Stuart Nicholson selected Triptykon as one of Garbarek's five essential recordings, noting that it presented a "radical twist" in his musical style.

In a similar vein, the AllMusic review by Brian Olewnick stated, "Norwegian saxophonist Jan Garbarek took several intriguing stylistic turns early in his career, none more extreme than that shown on Triptykon... an expressionist trio drawing on both free improvisation and Scandinavian folk tunes, roaring, stumbling, and reeling, evoking an aural equivalent of Edvard Munch. Garbarek's work on all his reeds is assured and imaginative, even as the context is often dark and bleak.... Highly recommended."

== Track listing ==
All compositions by Jan Garbarek, Arild Anderson & Edward Vesala except where noted.

1. "Rim" – 10:33
2. "Selje" – 2:16
3. "J.E.V." – 7:28
4. "Sang" – 2:45
5. "Triptykon" – 12:46
6. "Etu Hei!" (Garbarek, Vesala) – 2:20
7. "Bruremarsj" (Traditional) – 4:13

== Personnel ==
- Jan Garbarek – soprano saxophone, tenor saxophone, bass saxophone, flute
- Arild Andersen – bass
- Edward Vesala – percussion
