= Epigram (disambiguation) =

An epigram is a short poem with a clever twist, or a concise and witty statement.

Epigram may also refer to:

- Epigram (programming language), a functional programming language with dependent types
- Epigram (newspaper), the independent student newspaper of the University of Bristol
- Epigram (horse), Canadian racehorse
- Epigrams (books), a collection of books by Martial in the 1st century
- Epigram (inscription), an inscription in stone (obsolete)
- Fraszki, a 1584 Polish-language poem collection, sometimes referred to in English as Epigrams
