= Witchi-Tai-To (album) =

Studio album by the Jan Garbarek–Bobo Stenson Quartet
- Released: 1974
- Recorded: 27–28 November 1973
- Studio: Arne Bendiksen Studio; Oslo, Norway
- Genre: Jazz
- Length: 45:46
- Label: ECM 1041 ST
- Producer: Manfred Eicher

Jan Garbarek–Bobo Stenson Quartet chronology
Witchi-Tai-To (1974)	Dansere (1975)

Jan Garbarek chronology
Red Lanta (1974)	Witchi-Tai-To (1974)	Dansere (1976)

Bobo Stenson chronology
Underwear (1971)	Witchi-Tai-To (1974)	Dansere (1976)

Professional ratings
Review scores
Source	Rating
AllMusic	4.5/5 stars
The Rolling Stone Jazz Record Guide	4/5 stars
The Penguin Guide to Jazz Recordings	3.5/4 stars
VG (2014)	6/6 stars

Witchi-Tai-To is an album by the Jan Garbarek–Bobo Stenson Quartet recorded over two days in November 1973 and released on ECM the following year. The quartet features rhythm section Palle Danielsson and Jon Christensen.

== Reception ==
The AllMusic review by Brian Olewnick awards the album 4½ stars and states, "Long before he became the standard-bearer for the 'ECM sound,' churning out discs with a mildly medieval or Scandinavian flavor spiced with enough new age fluff to guarantee sales, Jan Garbarek produced a string of superb albums, culminating in Witchi-Tai-To, his masterpiece... He might never have reached similar heights since, but Witchi-Tai-To, along with Dave Holland's Conference of the Birds, is one of the two finest jazz albums that ECM ever released, and simply one of the very top jazz albums of the '70s."

== Track listing ==
1. "A.I.R." (Carla Bley) – 8:15
2. "Kukka" (Palle Danielsson) – 4:32
3. "Hasta Siempre" (Carlos Puebla) – 8:10
4. "Witchi-Tai-To" (Jim Pepper) – 4:24
5. "Desireless" (Don Cherry) – 20:25

== Personnel ==
=== Jan Garbarek–Bobo Stenson Quartet ===
- Jan Garbarek – tenor saxophone, soprano saxophone
- Bobo Stenson – piano
- Palle Danielsson – bass
- Jon Christensen – drums
