= Floating (Ketil Bjørnstad album) =

Studio album by Ketil Bjørnstad
- Released: September 12, 2005
- Recorded: Rainbow Studio, Oslo, Norway, May/June 2005
- Genre: Jazz
- Length: 67:44
- Label: Emarcy; Universal Music, Norway
- Producer: Ketil Bjørnstad

Ketil Bjørnstad chronology
Seafarer's Song (2003)	Floating (2005)	Rainbow Sessions (2006)

Floating (released October 3, 2005 in Oslo, Norway on the label EmArcy - 0602498728840) is an album by the Norwegian pianist Ketil Bjørnstad.

Professional ratings
Review scores
Source	Rating
Gemm	4/5 stars

== Review ==
For the first time in his rich and multifaceted career, Bjørnstad gives us an album with a trio constellation. He has a strong relationship to the melody and the melody to him. We have through some 30 years had the pleasure to witness this mutual love affair, and it has in no way diminished. Here we encounter melody and Bjørnstad in a new constellation and both thrive. Even though this is the first meeting between the three, there are large doses of empathy present and they have a lot to talk about.

== Reception ==
The Gemm review awarded the album 4 stars.

== Track listing ==
1. «Floating» (6:43)
2. «The Sorrow In Her Eyes» (5:01)
3. «Memory» (3:03)
4. «Ray Of Light» (6:52)
5. «Looking Back» (2:25)
6. «Caravan Moving» (2:55)
7. «Thought» (2:23)
8. «The Woman On The Pier» (5:06)
9. «Undercurrent» (3:54)
10. «The Rainbow» (4:06)
11. «The Course» (6:39)
12. «Her Singing» (3:41)
13. «The Face» (5:13)
14. «As You Always Said (To Rolf)» (3:58)
15. «The Waiting Room» (3:02)
16. «Floating (Epilogue)» (2:43)

== Personnel ==
- Ketil Bjørnstad - piano
- Palle Danielsson - double bass
- Marilyn Mazur - drums

== Credits ==
- Composer & producer – Ketil Bjørnstad
- Liner notes – Ketil Bjørnstad
- Recorded and mastered in Rainbow Studio, Oslo, Norway, May/June 2005

== Notes ==
℗ & © 2005 Universal Music AS, Norway
