= Grace (Ketil Bjørnstad album) =

Studio album by Ketil Bjørnstad
- Released: 2001
- Recorded: Live at Vossajazz, March 2000
- Genre: Jazz
- Length: 66:35
- Label: EmArcy; Universal Music
- Producer: Ketil Bjørnstad and the band

Ketil Bjørnstad chronology
Epigraphs (2000)	Grace (2001)	Before the Light (2001)

Grace (released 2001 by EmArcy, international release by Universal Music) is an album by the Norwegian pianist Ketil Bjørnstad.

Professional ratings
Review scores
Source	Rating
Panorama	4/6 stars
Amazon.com	4.5/5 stars

== Reception ==
The Panorama review by Harald Christian Langaas (15.2.2001, © Panorama Media) awarded the album four stars, stating:

... The lyrics of Grace is from the old English poet, John Donne, and it is truly beautiful and wise words for thought, which certainly deserves to be brought to light. Still, I might mention the embossed instrumental improvisation parties as the most successful. This is where the band's best qualities come into their own...

The Amazon.com readers review awarded the album 4½ stars.

== Track listing ==
All compositions by Ketil Bjørnstad.

1. «No Man Is An Iland...» (3:53)
2. «Lovers' Infiniteness» (6:44)
3. «The Bait» (2:41)
4. «White» (1:33)
5. «The Anniversary» (5:24)
6. «Love's Growth» (5:56)
7. «Song» (5:13)
8. «Love's Usury» (6:13)
9. «Naked» (2:51)
10. «Grace» (4:35)
11. «The Indifferent» (4:06)
12. «Mystery» (3:25)
13. «The Canonization» (5:50)
14. «Take A Flat Map...» (4:32)
15. «No Man Is An Iland... (Finale)» (3:39)

== Personnel ==
- Ketil Bjørnstad - piano
- Anneli Drecker - vocals
- Bendik Hofseth - saxophones & vocals
- Arild Andersen - double bass
- Trilok Gurtu - percussion
- Eivind Aarset - guitar & electronics
- Jan Bang - samplings & electronics
