= Bendik =

Bendik Բենդիկ
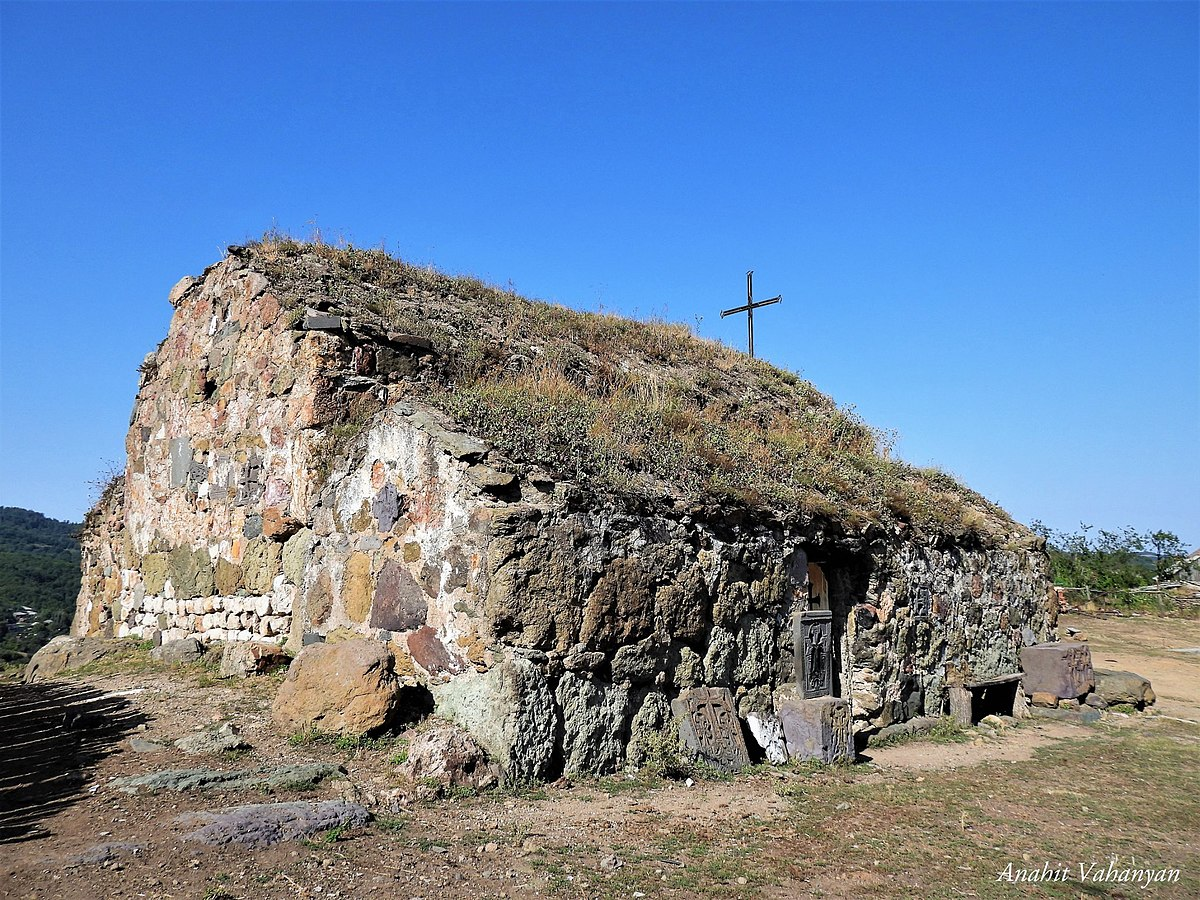
- Bendik St. Gevorg Church

- Location within Armenia
- Coordinates: 41°09′27″N 44°42′31″E
- Country: Armenia
- Province: Lori
- Elevation: 1,100 m (3,600 ft)

Population (2011)
  - Total: 101
- Time zone: UTC+4 (AMT)

Bendik (Armenian: Բենդիկ) is a village in the Lori Province of Armenia.
