= The River (Ketil Bjørnstad & David Darling album) =

Studio album by Ketil Bjørnstad / David Darling
- Released: 1997
- Recorded: June 1996
- Studio: Rainbow Studio; Oslo, Norway
- Genre: Jazz
- Length: 55:01
- Label: ECM; ECM 1593
- Producer: Manfred Eicher

Ketil Bjørnstad chronology
Haugtussa (1995)	The River (1997)	The Sea II (1996)

Professional ratings
Review scores
Source	Rating
AllMusic	3/5 stars

The River is an album by Norwegian pianist Ketil Bjørnstad and American cellist David Darling recorded in June 1996 and released on ECM the following year.

== Reception ==
The AllMusic review awarded the album 3 stars.

== Track listing ==
All music is composed by Ketil Bjørnstad & David Darling, except as noted.

No.	Title	Writer(s)	Length
1.	"I"	William Byrd	3:11
2.	"II"		5:46
3.	"III"	Byrd	2:30
4.	"IV"		5:19
5.	"V"		5:38
6.	"VI"		5:18
7.	"VII"		7:37
8.	"VIII"		4:57
9.	"IX"		6:26
10.	"X"		3:23
11.	"XI"		3:14
12.	"XII"	Orlando Gibbons	1:42
Total length:			55:01

== Personnel ==
=== Musicians ===
- Ketil Bjørnstad – piano
- David Darling – cello

=== Technical personnel ===
- Manfred Eicher – producer
- Jan Erik Kongshaug – engineer
- Mayo Bucher – cover
- Detlev Riller – layout
- Pål Hoff – photography
- Ketil Bjørnstad – liner notes
