= Sommernatt ved fjorden =

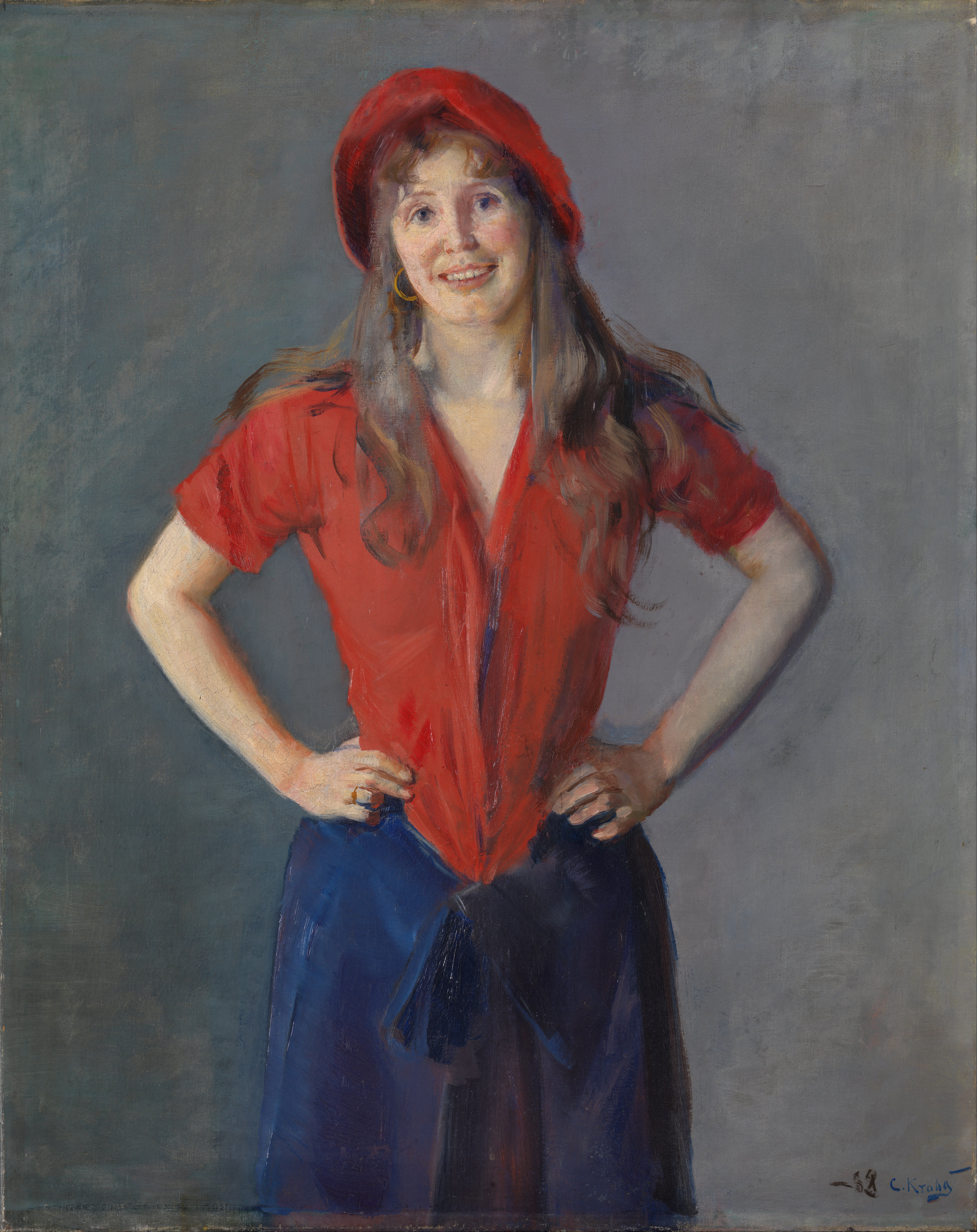
Portrait of the Painter Oda Krohg painted by Christian Krohg

Sommernatt ved fjorden (in English: Summernight by the Fjord) is a Norwegian song written by Ketil Bjørnstad and sung by the opera singer Ellen Westberg Andersen. This song is the most famous on the album Leve Patagonia that was released on LP in 1978, later re-released on CD. The work is written as a modern suite, and tells the story of the Kristiania Bohemians Hans Jaeger and Oda Krohg. Sommernatt ved fjorden has since been sung by artists like Sissel Kyrkjebø, Christine Gulbrandsen and Rein Alexander.

Sommernatt ved fjorden is about Hans Jaeger and Oda Lasson in a small boat out on the fjord on a summer night, as described by the sister of Oda who watches the pair out on the fjord from her window at their holiday home in Hvitsten.

The romantic song has become part of the Norwegian lexicon and is regularly played on radio and in cafes.
