= Water Stories (Ketil Bjørnstad album) =

Studio album by Ketil Bjørnstad
- Released: 1993
- Recorded: January 1993
- Studio: Rainbow Studio; Oslo, Norway
- Genre: Jazz
- Length: 57:42
- Label: ECM; ECM 1503
- Producer: Manfred Eicher

Ketil Bjørnstad chronology
Løsrivelse (1993)	Water Stories (1993)	For Den Som Elsker (1994)

Water Stories is an album by Norwegian pianist Ketil Bjørnstad recorded in January 1993 and released on ECM later that year. The quartet features rhythm section Terje Rypdal, Bjørn Kjellemyr and Jon Christensen, with drummer Per Hillestad substituting Christensen on part two.

== Reception ==
The AllMusic review awarded the album 3 stars.

Professional ratings
Review scores
Source	Rating
AllMusic	3/5 stars

== Track listing ==
All compositions by Ketil Bjørnstad.

1. "Glacial Reconstruction" – 6:56
2. "Levels and Degrees" – 7:16
3. "Surface Movements" – 4:24
4. "The View I" – 5:17
5. "Between Memory and Presentiment" – 4:00
6. "Ten Thousand Years Later" – 7:08
7. "Waterfall" – 2:10
8. "Flotation and Surroundings" – 5:17
9. "Riverscape" – 2:11
10. "Approaching the Sea" – 4:48
11. "The View II" – 4:28
12. "History" – 3:47

== Personnel ==
=== Part one: Blue Ice (The Glacier) (tracks 1–5) ===
- Ketil Bjørnstad – piano
- Terje Rypdal – guitar
- Bjørn Kjellemyr – bass
- Jon Christensen – drums

=== Part two: Approaching the Sea (tracks 6–12) ===
- Ketil Bjørnstad – piano
- Terje Rypdal – guitar
- Bjørn Kjellemyr – bass
- Per Hillestad – drums
