= Robert Bendick =

- Born: February 8, 1917
- Died: June 22, 2008 (aged 91)
- Occupation: Television producer

Robert Bendick (February 8, 1917 - June 22, 2008) was an American cameraman turned television producer, best known as the producer of Today between the years of 1953-1955, and 1958-1960.

== Biography ==
Robert Bendick attended New York University, and the C.H. White school of Photography. Learning to use a camera, Bendick worked for National Geographic and Time magazines.

Eventually hired onto CBS in 1941 and one of the original three cameramen. Ultimately working his way up to producer, he produced Today, and other major televised shows for both NBC and CBS during what is coined the golden years of television.

One of Bendick's most famous productions come from a series called Wide Wide World, a documentary series that aired on NBC Sunday afternoons at 4 pm. Wide Wide World was a documentary series that aired for one hour, and was filmed in different parts of the world. This was the only show of its kind at the time. His production consisted of "Sunday Driver," "Land of Plenty," "and "Two Ways to Winter."

Bendick's works also consist of the produced coverage for both film and television of the 1962 America's Cup sailing races, opening night at the New York World's Fair (1962), The 17th annual Emmy Awards show (1965), and the 1964 Republican Convention.
