= The Nest (album) =

Studio album by Ketil Bjørnstad
- Released: 2003
- Recorded: August–December 2002
- Genre: Jazz
- Length: 62:45
- Label: Emarcy
- Producer: Ketil Bjørnstad

Ketil Bjørnstad chronology
Old (2001)	The Nest (2003)	Seafarer's Song (2004)

The Nest (released 2003 in Oslo, Norway on the Emarcy (067 153-2) label) is an album by Norwegian pianist Ketil Bjørnstad, with special guest artist Anneli Drecker, presenting lyrics by the poet Hart Crane (1899–1932).

Professional ratings
Review scores
Source	Rating
Dagbladet	4/5 stars
Amazon.de	4.5/5 stars

== Reception ==
The Dagbladet review awarded the album 4 stars, and Amazon.de review 4.5 stars.

== Track listing ==
1. «The Nest» (2:40)
  - Preludium
2. «In Shadow» (4:20)
3. «The Window» (3:07)
4. «The Bridge I» (5:07)
5. «The Bathers» (4:06)
6. «The Hope I» (1:36)
7. «Exile» (3:14)
8. «The Circle» (4:34)
9. «Darkland» (2:37)
10. «Forgetfulness» (4:00)
11. «The Joy» (3:41)
12. «The Bridge II» (5:04)
13. «Old Song» (3:48)
14. «The Hope II» (5:04)
15. «The Memory» (4:30)
16. «Fear» (3:28)
17. «The Nest» (4:01)
  - Postludium

== Personnel ==
- Ketil Bjørnstad – piano & synthesizers
- Anneli Drecker – vocals
- Nora Taksdal – viola
- Eivind Aarset – guitars
- Kjetil Bjerkestrand – synthesizers, samples & percussion

== Credits ==
- All compositions by Ketil Bjørnstad
- Words from the poetry of Hart Crane (1899–1932)
- Produced by Ketil Bjørnstad
- Recorded at Rainbow Studio, Oslo, Norway, August–December 2002
- Engineer – Jan Erik Kongshaug
- Additional recordings by Kjetil Bjerkestrand and Peer Espen Ursfjord
- Mixed by Jan Erik Konshaug and Ketil Bjørnstad
- Mastering by Bjørn Engelmann, Cutting Room, Stockholm, Sweden
- Cover Photo – «The Nest», from the series «In the Feminine» by Eva-Maria Riegler
- Artist photos – Stian Andersen
- Cover design – Deville
- Anneli Drecker appears courtesy of EMI Records, Norway
