= Night Song (Ketil Bjørnstad and Svante Henryson album) =

Studio album by Ketil Bjørnstad and Svante Henryson
- Released: January 21, 2011
- Recorded: January 2009
- Studio: Rainbow Studio; Oslo Norway
- Genre: Jazz
- Length: 76:58
- Label: ECM; ECM 2108
- Producer: Manfred Eicher

Ketil Bjørnstad chronology
Remembrance (2010)	Night Song (2011)	Vinding's Music - Songs from the Alder Thicket (2012)

Night Song is an album by Norwegian pianist Ketil Bjørnstad and Swedish cellist Svante Henryson recorded in Norway in January 2009 and released on ECM two years later in 2011.

== Reception ==
The All About Jazz review by John Kelman said that "Defined by stark simplicity and a quiet majesty powered more by calm than energy, both Bjørnstad and Henryson value the purity of every note, and the resultant overtones when permitted decay to their inevitable conclusion. Neither seems compelled to speak more than is absolutely necessary, their discretion and unfailing choices defining qualities that allow Night Song's 16 original compositions (all but four by Bjørnstad) no shortage of interpretive unpredictability, despite never losing sight of—or respect for—the essence of each piece."

== Track listing ==
All compositions by Ketil Bjørnstad except as indicated

1. "Night Song (Evening Version)" - 4:31
2. "Visitor" - 5:11
3. "Fall" (Svante Henryson) - 3:29
4. "Edge" - 5:39
5. "Reticence" (Henryson) - 5:44
6. "Schubert Said" - 4:36
7. "Adoro" - 6:26
8. "Share" - 4:26
9. "Melting Ice" (Henryson) - 3:25
10. "Serene" - 6:02
11. "The Other" - 4:08
12. "Own" - 3:15
13. "Sheen" - 5:45
14. "Chain" - 6:19
15. "Tar" (Henryson) - 3:02
16. "Night Song (Morning Version)" - 5:00

== Personnel ==
- Ketil Bjørnstad – piano
- Svante Henryson – cello
