= Marc Bendick Jr. =

United States economist

Marc Bendick Jr
- Education: University of California, Berkeley; University of Wisconsin-Madison

Marc Bendick Jr. (born August 20, 1946) is a United States economist and interdisciplinary social scientist who conducts and applies research concerning public policy issues of employment, discrimination, poverty, and social and economic inequality.

== Early life and education ==
Bendick was born in Bridgeport, Connecticut. He graduated as a Regents' Scholar from the University of California, Berkeley in 1968, where he studied economics and social psychology. He received his Ph.D. in economics from the University of Wisconsin-Madison in 1975, where he was affiliated with the Institute for Research on Poverty.

== Career ==
His work also reflects the systems analysis approach developed in the U.S. Defense Department under Robert McNamara, to which he was exposed as an operations research analyst in the aerospace industry from 1968 to 1970. His thinking has been further influenced by long-time collaboration with Mary Lou Egan, Ph.D., a business school professor, researcher and consultant on business strategy, international business, and economic development.

From 1975 to 1984, Bendick was a senior researcher and program manager at the non-profit Urban Institute. From 1984 to 2023, he was a co-principal in Bendick and Egan Economic Consultants, Inc.

== Research and its impact ==
Bendick's more than 140 research publications have been cited in other scholarly work, both in the US and internationally, more than 5,000 times. Primarily, it concerns "mid-level theory," in which empirical findings are integrated with (and often motivate) academic theory and, within economics, on the concept of X-inefficiency rather than more mainstream micro-economic concerns. Accordingly, this work has been as frequently included in university syllabi in applied fields such as public policy, business, law, social work, education, and management as in academic fields such as economics, sociology, and psychology. As such, it has contributed to the growing movement for evidence-based policy in multiple social policy fields.

The majority of these publications concern improvement in employment opportunities for workers traditionally disfavored in the mainstream American labor market. This work often involves developing innovative quantitative measures of employment discrimination, including: applying situation testing (also called discrimination audit studies) to hiring; benchmarking firms' employment patterns against those of peer firms; distinguishing voluntary and involuntary occupational segregation; quantifying wage discrimination; and identifying conscious and unconscious bias in employers’ organizational culture.

This documentation of the continuing prevalence of employment discrimination in the American workplace in the 21st Century has been frequently cited as a factual predicate for research by others, including on emerging topics such as bias in algorithmic- and artificial intelligence-based screening of job applications. Equally, it has been widely cited by news media and policy advocates in debates on anti-discrimination strategies including government-mandated affirmative action and employers' initiatives to promote workforce diversity, equity, and inclusion. Because it linked organizational policies and practices and individual psychological processes directly to biased workplace outcomes, this research has illuminated processes that economic analyses of discrimination had traditionally left an unexamined "black box" and contributed to the emerging sub-discipline of behavioral economics.

In evaluating anti-poverty strategies in the United States, Bendick's research has emphasized the complementarities, rather than the substitutability, between public programs and private market-based alternatives. It thus defined common ground between policies advocated by political liberals (e.g., the War on Poverty) and private market-based alternatives championed by political conservatives (e.g., the Reagan Administration in the US in the 1980s and the Tea Party Movement in the US in the early 21st Century). This research typically identified best practices to enhance the efficiency and effectiveness of both approaches.

A related theme also sought common ground between liberal and conservative approaches. It identified opportunities to implement liberal proposals for expanding government's role in forms more acceptable to proponents of limited government. These approaches included providing income assistance to low-income families in "in-kind" form rather than cash; contracting out government operations; pairing income assistance to low income families with strong work requirements; and releasing government data to support private legal enforcement ("information regulation"). Reflecting this non-ideological mind set, Bendick has often helped to achieve consensus in government and non-profit advisory bodies.

Other research by Bendick has examined the experience of other industrialized nations to identify lessons relevant to United States. This work promoted attention to these perspectives when it was less common in U.S. public policy analysis.

== Applying research ==
Bendick has served as an expert witness in several dozen large class action lawsuits involving race, ethnicity, national origin, gender, age, disability, or sexual orientation/gender identity discrimination in employment. His litigation analyses have been cited in opinions by 44 Federal courts including the U.S. Supreme Court, and in 109 law review articles or legal treatises.

He has also been a consultant to major U.S. employers on best practices for increasing the diversity of their workforces and the inclusiveness of their workplaces.

Bendick's research has been recognized by awards from the Human Resource Planning Society, National Tax Association, and Women in International Trade. In 2022, he received the Impact for Equality Award of the Equal Rights Center, Washington DC.
