= Bendik Riis =

Norwegian painter

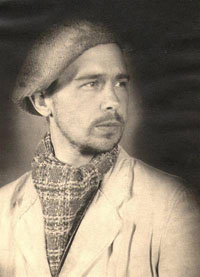

Bendik Arnold Riis Kristiansen (20 November 1911 – 20 January 1988) was a Norwegian artist whose works are on display at National Museum of Art, Architecture and Design.

He graduated from Norwegian National Academy of Craft and Art Industry.

Art created by Riis (while he was committed as a mental patient, against his own wishes) at Gaustad Sykehus, disappeared into the possession of employees of the hospital, against the wishes of the artist according to Ketil Bjørnstad's biography of the artist.

== Works ==
Aftenposten said that the painting Castraktion (castration) from 1957 is "counted among his most important". (A copy of the painting was printed in Aftenposten in 2011.)
