= La notte (album) =

Live album by Ketil Bjørnstad
- Released: April 12, 2013
- Recorded: July 21, 2010
- Venues: Moldejazz; Molde, Norway
- Genre: Jazz
- Length: 54:42
- Label: ECM 2300
- Producer: Manfred Eicher

Ketil Bjørnstad chronology
Vinding's Music - Songs from the Alder Thicket (2012)	La notte (2013)

La notte (Italian: The Night) is a live album by Norwegian pianist Ketil Bjørnstad recorded at the Molde International Jazz Festival in Norway on July 21, 2010 and released on ECM in April 2013.

== Reception ==
Professional ratings
Review scores
Source	Rating
Allmusic	4/5 stars
The Independent	3/5 stars

The AllMusic review by Thom Jurek awarded the album 4 stars stating "Bjørnstad has always valued subtlety and suggestion over frenetic engagement on his recordings. That is certainly true here, but he is also a wise bandleader: he chose these players for their myriad abilities to dialogue kinetically, listen deeply, and respond powerfully whenever the music dictated, and he was correct in doing so across the board. La Notte is rich, deep, and wonderful."

All About Jazz's Hrayr Attarian said, "Much like the works of the cineastes that have inspired Bjørnstad's stimulating and captivating composition, its intellectual and emotional impact lasts long after the disc has stopped spinning."

The Independent's Nick Coleman gave the album 3 stars saying, "Familiar Bjornstad characteristics prevail: romantic tone, sedate tempo, shallow trajectory, much thought over what often sounds like uncomplicated harmony."

== Track listing ==
All compositions by Ketil Bjørnstad

1. "I" – 6:53
2. "II" – 8:23
3. "III" – 4:36
4. "IV" – 5:27
5. "V" – 8:31
6. "VI" – 6:44
7. "VII" – 7:04
8. "VIII" – 7:00

== Personnel ==
- Ketil Bjørnstad – piano
- Andy Sheppard – tenor saxophone, soprano saxophone
- Eivind Aarset – guitars, electronics
- Anja Lechner – cello
- Arild Andersen – bass
- Marilyn Mazur – drums, percussion
