= Epigraphs (album) =

Studio album by Ketil Bjørnstad / David Darling
- Released: 2000
- Recorded: September 1998
- Studios: Rainbow Studio; Oslo, Norway
- Genre: Jazz
- Length: 56:51
- Labels: ECM; ECM 1684
- Producer: Manfred Eicher

Ketil Bjørnstad chronology
| Himmelrand (1999) | Epigraphs (2000) | Grace (2001) |

Epigraphs is an album by Norwegian pianist Ketil Bjørnstad with American cellist David Darling recorded in September 1998 and released on ECM in 2000.

== Background ==
Tracks from Epigraph were used as part of the soundtrack of Jean-Luc Godard's film In Praise of Love.

== Reception ==
Professional ratings
Review scores
| Source | Rating |
|---|---|
| All About Jazz | 3.5/5 stars |
| AllMusic | 4/5 stars |

The All About Jazz review by Glenn Astarita awarded the album 3.5 stars. The AllMusic review by Rick Anderson awarded the album 4 stars, stating:

To call this music "minimalist" wouldn't be entirely accurate, since there's quite a bit of harmonic movement and not much repetition, but because Bjornstad and Darling's playing is so consistently gentle and the music is so consistently quiet and pleasant, this album has a flavor that will be familiar to fans of Philip Glass and Arvo Pärt. Recommended.

== Track listing ==
All compositions by Ketil Bjørnstad, except as noted.

1. "Epigraph No. 1" – 3:04
2. "Upland" – 4:04
3. "Wakening" – 4:10
4. "Epigraph No. 1, Var. 1" – 1:39
5. "Pavane" (William Byrd) – 3:39
6. "Fantasia" (Orlando Gibbons) – 1:59
7. "Epigraph No. 1, Var. 2" – 2:20
8. "The Guest" – 2:41
9. "After Celan" – 3:46
10. "Song for TKJD" (David Darling) – 6:24
11. "Silent Dream" (Darling) – 4:41
12. "The Lake" – 4:11
13. "Gothic" – 4:07
14. "Epigraph No. 1, Var. 3" – 1:28
15. "Le jour s'endort" (Guillaume Dufay) – 3:44
16. "Factus est repente" (Gregor Aichinger) – 4:54

== Personnel ==
- Ketil Bjørnstad – piano
- David Darling – cello
