= Svante Henryson =

Swedish musician and composer

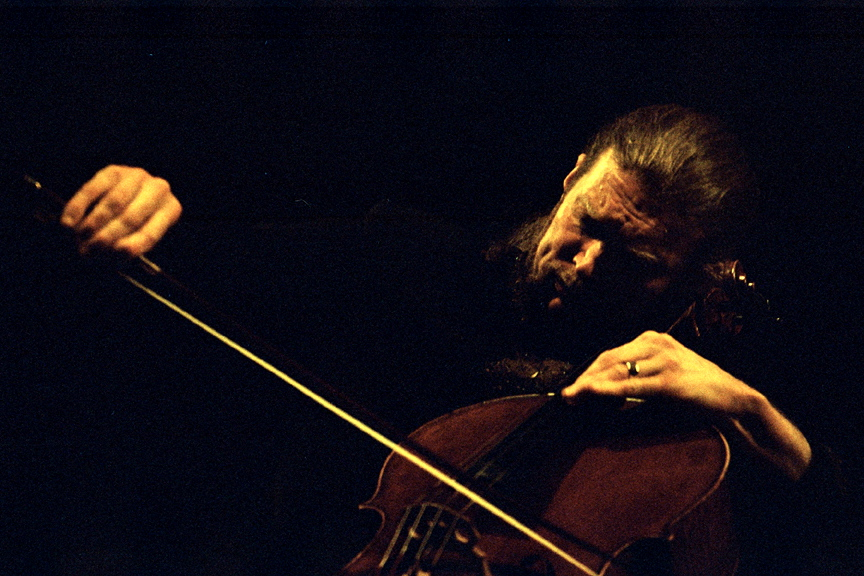
- Henryson performing in 2004

Background information
- Born: 22 October 1963 (age 62); Stockholm, Sweden
- Genres: Jazz, classical, hard rock, fusion
- Occupations: Composer, musician
- Instruments: Cello, bass guitar, double bass
- Years active: 1975–present
- Label: ECM

Svante Henryson (born 22 October 1963) is a Swedish composer, cellist, bass guitarist and double bassist, active within jazz, classical music, and hard rock.

== Biography ==
=== Childhood and studies ===
Svante Henryson was born in Stockholm and grew up in Umeå in northern Sweden. His father was a full professor of education, and his mother a director of studies in English at Umeå University.

At age 12, after falling in love-at-a-distance with a female bassist at a concert, Svante began playing bass guitar in a rock band. Two years later, he switched to jazz and double bass. A concert with Stan Getz at the Umeå Jazz Festival made up his mind about becoming a musician. Another life-changing experience was hearing the Royal Stockholm Philharmonic Orchestra in concert in Östersund.

He left his hometown already at age 14 to study music; two years in Härnösand, three years at Ingesund College of Music and (later) one year at the Academy of Performing Arts in Prague. He was Principal Double Bass of the World Youth Orchestra 1983 to 1984.

=== Early professional years ===
Still in his teens and halfway through music college, he became a member of the Oslo Philharmonic under Mariss Jansons 1983–1986. After making his solo debut with the Oslo Philharmonic in Wanhal's Bass Concerto, he became the orchestra's assistant principal bassist.

1987–1989 he was principal bassist of the Norwegian Chamber Orchestra led by Iona Brown.

After a drastic change in direction, he became bass guitarist of Yngwie Malmsteen's band 1989–1992. During this period he started playing cello, an instrument on which he is an autodidact.

Henrysons first solo album, Enkidu, was released in 1997. He has also been prominently featured on many other albums in a very wide musical area.

As a session player he has worked with Ryan Adams, Elvis Costello and Steve Gadd.

=== Today ===
Svante Henryson is a composer of orchestral music, as well as choral music and chamber music. His "Electric Bass Concerto", composed in 2007, introduces the bass guitar in a new role as a classical solo instrument.

Elvis Costello and Henryson collaborated as songwriters on the album "For the Stars".

Svante Henryson is an ECM recording artist, performing in various formations with Jon Balke, Ketil Bjørnstad, Wolfgang Muthspiel, Marilyn Mazur, Arve Henriksen, Trygve Seim, Anders Jormin, Terje Rypdal and Palle Mikkelborg.

He also performs in chamber music duos and trios with Roland Pöntinen, Martin Fröst, Anne Sofie von Otter and Bengt Forsberg. Svante has been the musical director of Asian, American and European tours with Anne Sofie von Otter.

Svante Henryson was Northern Norway's Landsdelsmusikernes Artist-in-Residence 2010–2012, composing and performing with the Sami community.

He is currently artistic director of the Umeå Chamber Music Festival.

Svante Henryson is a member of the Royal Swedish Academy of Music.

== Awards ==
- The Royal Swedish Academy of Music International Studies Scholarship 1983
- Spellemannprisen 1984 for Tchaikovsky Symphony No. 5 (with the Oslo Philharmonic)
- Spellemannprisen 1987 for Shostakovich Symphony No. 5 (with the Oslo Philharmonic)
- Spellemannprisen 1988 for Britten/Mozart/Tchaikovsky (with the Norwegian Chamber Orchestra)
- Spellemannprisen 1988 Spellemann of the Year (with the Norwegian Chamber Orchestra)
- Rikskonserter Sweden, the Lansering '90 Prize in 1990.
- The 1997 Nordkraft Prize for jazz soloists.
- Chamber Music Piece of the Year in 2010 for Sonata for Solo Violin awarded by the Swedish Music Publishers' Association.
- Jazz Musician of the Year ("Jazzkatten") by the Swedish Radio in 2014.
- Henryson was awarded the Nordic Council Music Prize in 2015.

== Works ==
(selected)

=== Orchestral ===
- Symphony no.1 for orchestra (1993)
- Legatissimo for cello and orchestra (first performance 1996)
- Songs from the Milky Way concerto for cello and orchestra (1997)
- Memento for cello and string orchestra (2003)
- Electric Bass Concerto no. 1 for bass guitar and orchestra (2007)
- Vinterfest concert overture for orchestra (2007)
- Symphony no.2 - Sinfonia Concertante for orchestra (2009)
- Cello Concerto nr. 2 for cello and orchestra (2010)
- Amorphicon for steel pans, electric cello and string orchestra (2011)
- Electric Bass Concerto no. 2 "Ghostnotes" for fretless bass guitar and symphonic wind ensemble (2015)
- I dreamt of a Bach Cello Concerto for cello, strings and basso continuo (2019)
- Five Timepieces for jazz cello and string orchestra (2019)
- From Nowhere for orchestra (2020)
- O du tysta bolero från Utanmyra for orchestra (2020)

=== Choral ===
- Eyes of a Child for five voices a cappella (1999)
- Himlar av Djupaste Glädje for soprano, mixed choir and piano (2007)
- Enfaldiga Ren for soprano, mezzo, alto, mixed choir, string octet, guitar and six-handed piano (2009)
- DoReMi SaReGa for cello, men's choir and jazz trio (2009)
- Lämmeln och vråken for female choir, accordion and cello (2010)
- Vidderna Inom Mig for cello, mixed choir, children's choir and chamber orchestra (2011)
- Sveriges Flagga (after Hugo Alfvén) for mixed choir (2022)
- Förlåtelse for mixed choir (2023)

=== Chamber music ===
- Vintermusik for soprano, tenor, narrator, clarinet, bassoon, violin, double bass and percussion (1980)
- Slussen (the Sluice) for cello and city sounds (1994)
- Suite Off Pist for soprano saxophone and cello (1996, 2019)
- Colors in D (Black Run-Green-Blues Chaconne) for solo cello (2001-1996-2008)
- π (pi) for violin, cello and drum set (2006)
- Sarabande Metamorphose for cello and piano (2007)
- Allegro Moderato for clarinet, cello and piano (2007)
- Quartet for Violin, Viola and Two Celli (2007)
- Eckency for cello and piano (2008)
- Sonata for Solo Violin (2009)
- Narvik 9 for flute, clarinet, bassoon, string quartet, hammerclavier and bass guitar (2012)
- 3X3 for violin, cello and guitar (2012)
- Rain for cello and piano (2013)
- Fragments for violin and cello (2013)
- Desperate Love Songs for mezzo, cello and guitar (2013)
- Mon Lean Duhat Jagi - music for a Sami theatre play for flute, clarinet, string quartet, piano and percussion (2014)
- Eurydice and Her Underground Dance Routines for soprano saxophone, violin, piano, electric bass and drum set (2014)
- Mastodonic Recital for narrator, tenor saxophone, piano, electric bass and drum set (2015)
- Mirrors of Absence 24 songs for mezzo and piano (2016)
- First Movement for piano trio (2017)
- String Quartet no. 1 (2018)
- Two Pieces for cello and guitar (2019)
- Rakesong for cello and piano (2019)
- Light Touches for cello and double bass (2020)
- Mattagit for yoik and four double basses (2021)
- Crux for soprano saxophone (2021)
- String Quartet no. 2 (2022)
- Dark Light for cello and brass quintet (2022)
- Saraband for cello and piano (2023)

== Discography ==
(selected)

- Norwegian Chamber Orchestra/Iona Brown – Mozart/Britten/Tchaikovsky (recorded in 1988) double bass
- Norwegian Chamber Orchestra/Iona Brown – Mozart (1988) double bass
- Yngwie Malmsteen – Eclipse (1990) bass guitar, double bass
- Yngwie Malmsteen – Fire & Ice (1992) bass guitar, double bass, cello
- Norwegian Chamber Orchestra/Iona Brown – Britten (1991) double bass, cello
- Glory – Crisis vs crisis (1994) bass guitar, double bass, cello
- Uno Svenningsson – Under ytan (1994) cello
- Thomas Jäderlund – Amazing Orchestra (1994) cello, composer
- Erik Weissglas – Stoneheater (1994) composer, bass guitar, double bass, cello
- Ted Gärdestad – Äntligen på väg (1994) bass guitar
- Kee Marcello – Shine on (1995) bass guitar, double bass
- Lion's Share – Fall From Grace (2000) cello
- Brazen Abbot – Live and learn (1995) bass guitar
- Joey Tempest – A place to call home (1995) bass guitar
- Mikael Samuelson – Midvinter (1996) composer, cello, celtar
- Svante Henryson – Enkidu (1997) composer, cello, celtar, double bass
- Anne Sofie von Otter – Home for Christmas (1999) arranger, cello, celtar, double bass
- Anne Sofie von Otter/Elvis Costello – For the Stars (2000) composer, cello, double bass, bass guitar
- Svante Henryson, Daniel Nelson, Fredrik Högberg – 21st Century Swedish Composers (2001) composer, cello
- Jon Balke's Magnetic North Orchestra – Kyanos (2001) cello, composer
- Ryan Adams – Demolition (2002) cello
- Ketil Bjørnstad – Seafarer's Song (2003) cello
- Morten Halle Trio – Ten Easy Pieces (2004) cello
- Krister Jonsson Trio + Svante Henryson – Waiting For Atonesjka (2004) cello, composer
- Musik för Trio – Music for Trio (2007) composer, double bass, cello
- Kristin Asbjørnsen – The Night Shines Like the Day (2008) cello, bass guitar
- Anders Wihk / Svante Henryson / Steve Gadd – Same Tree Different Fruit (2009) bass guitar, double bass
- Ketil Bjørnstad – Hvalenes sang (2009) cello
- Mats Bergström – Electric Counterpoint (2010) bass guitar
- Ketil Bjørnstad & Svante Henryson – Night Song (2011) cello, composer
- Arve Henriksen - The Nature Of Connections (2012) cello, composer
- Krister Jonsson Deluxe - Truckload (2013) cello
- Terje Isungset - Meditations (2013) ice cello
- Wolfgang Muthspiel – Vienna World (2013) cello
- The Real Group – Three Decades of Vocal Music (2013) composer
- Katarina & Svante Henryson - High, Low or In Between (2014) cello, composer
- Hélène Collerette – Norigine - works for Solo Violin (2015) composer
- Trygve Seim - Rumi Songs (2015) cello
- Weissglas-Henryson-Backenroth-Ekberg - Seven Songs from the 70s (2018) cello
- Svante Henryson – Frånvarons speglar/Mirrors of absence - 24 songs (2019) composer
- Luca Sellitto - The voice within (2019) bass guitar, cello
- Västerås Sinfonietta - Reflections (2020) composer
- Avatarium - Death, where is thy sting (2020) cello, composer
- Yelena Eckemoff - Rosendals Garden (2026) cello, bass guitar, double bass
