= The Sea (Ketil Bjørnstad album) =

Studio album by Ketil Bjørnstad
- Released: 1995
- Recorded: September 1994
- Studio: Rainbow Studio; Oslo, Norway
- Genre: Chamber jazz, folk jazz, new-age
- Length: 74:41
- Label: ECM; ECM 1545
- Producer: Manfred Eicher

Ketil Bjørnstad chronology
Salomos Høysang (1995)	The Sea (1995)	Haugtussa (1995)

The Sea is an album by Norwegian pianist Ketil Bjørnstad recorded in September 1994 and released on ECM the following year. The quartet features guitarist Terje Rypdal, cellist David Darling, and drummer Jon Christensen.

== Reception ==
Professional ratings
Review scores
Source	Rating
AllMusic	4.5/5 stars

AllMusic awarded the album 4½ out of 5 stars, with jazz critic Scott Yanow stating, "The music is generally mournful, full of space, floating and very much a soundtrack for one's thoughts... Some listeners may enjoy its introspective and peaceful nature of these performances but most will find this a bit of a bore."

== Track listing ==
All music is composed by Ketil Bjørnstad

No.	Title	Length
1.	"I"	7:56
2.	"II"	7:31
3.	"III"	4:42
4.	"IV"	8:50
5.	"V"	6:42
6.	"VI"	9:20
7.	"VII"	5:19
8.	"VIII"	2:43
9.	"IX"	5:51
10.	"X"	4:34
11.	"XI"	7:34
12.	"XII"	3:39

== Personnel ==
- Ketil Bjørnstad – piano
- Terje Rypdal – guitar
- David Darling – cello
- Jon Christensen – drums
