= Terje Rypdal discography =

Terje Rypdal discography

== As leader ==
- 1968: Bleak House (Polydor/Universal, Norway 547 885–2)
- 1971: Terje Rypdal (ECM 1016)
- 1973: What Comes After (ECM 1031)
- 1974: Whenever I Seem to Be Far Away (ECM 1045)
- 1975: Odyssey (ECM 1067/8)
- 1976: After the Rain (ECM 1083)
- 1977: Waves (ECM 1110) 1977
- 1979: Terje Rypdal / Miroslav Vitous / Jack DeJohnette (ECM 1125), with Miroslav Vitous & Jack DeJohnette
- 1980: Descendre (ECM 1144)
- 1981: To Be Continued (ECM 1192), with Miroslav Vitous & Jack DeJohnette
- 1984: Eos (ECM 1263), with David Darling
- 1985: Chaser (ECM 1303), with The Chasers
- 1987: Blue (ECM 1346), with The Chasers
- 1989: The Singles Collection (ECM 1383), with The Chasers
- 1990: Undisonus (ECM 1389)
- 1991: Q.E.D. (ECM 1474)
- 1995: If Mountains Could Sing (ECM 1554)
- 1997: Skywards (ECM 1608)
- 1997: Rypdal & Tekrø (RCA 74321 242962), with Ronni Le Tekrø
- 1997: Rypdal/Tekrø II, with Ronni Le Tekrø
- 2000: Double Concerto / 5th Symphony (ECM 1567)
- 2002: Lux Aeterna (ECM 1818)
- 2002: The Radiosong (BeatHeaven Records BH 006) with Ronni Le Tekrø
- 2002: Birgitte Stærnes Sonata Op.73 / Nimbus Op.76 (MTG Music MTG CD 70085)
- 2002: Selected Recordings (Volume VII of ECM's :rarum series) (rarum 8007)
- 2006: Vossabrygg (ECM 1984), commissioned work at Vossajazz 2003
- 2010: Crime Scene (ECM 2014), live recording
- 2012: Odyssey In Studio & In Concert (ECM 2136–38) 3xCD album
- 2013: Melodic Warrior (ECM 2006) with The Hilliard Ensemble
- 2020: Conspiracy (ECM 2658)

== As sideman ==
Within The Vanguards

- 1965: Hjemme Igjen
- 1966: Phnooole
- 1980: Norsk Rock's Gyldne År (Sonet SLP 1458)
- 1986: Comanchero (Polydor 831 208–1)
- 1990: Twang!!! (DLP 33043/Triola TRCD 06)
- 2003: Vanguards Special (Tylden & Co. GTACD8191/2), The Vanguards 1963-2003 collection

With Lester Bowie

- 1969: Gittin' to Know Y'All (MPS/BASF)

With Jan Garbarek

- 1969: Esoteric Circle (Freedom FCD 41031)
- 1970: Afric Pepperbird (ECM 1007)
- 1971: Sart (ECM 1015)

With George Russell

- 1969: Electronic Sonata for Souls Loved by Nature
- 1970: Trip to Prillarguri (Soul Note 121029–2)
- 1971: Listen to the Silence (Soul Note 121024–2)
- 1971: The Essence of George Russell (Sonet)

With Jan Erik Vold

- 1969: Briskeby Blues (Philips 834 711–2)
- 1971: Hav (Philips 6507 002)

With John Surman

- 1973: Morning Glory (Future Music FMRCD-13 L495)
- 1994: Nordic Quartet (ECM)

With Michael Mantler

- 1976: The Hapless Child (WATT/ECM)

With Edward Vesala

- 1977: Satu (ECM)

with Barre Phillips

- 1978: Three Day Moon (ECM)

With Ketil Bjørnstad

- 1993: Water Stories (ECM)
- 1995: The Sea (ECM)
- 1998: The Sea II (ECM)
- 2008: Life in Leipzig (ECM)

With Tomasz Stańko

- 1997: Litania: Music of Krzysztof Komeda (ECM)

With Michael Galasso

- 2005: High Lines (ECM)

With Paolo Vinaccia

- 2010: Very Much Alive (Jazzland), 6xCD album

With Elephant9

- 2024: Catching Fire (Rune Grammofon RCD2236)

With Others

- 1967: Get Dreamy (Polydor 842 972–2), within The Dream (including Hans Marius Stormoen, Tom Karlsen, Christian Reim)
- 1970: Min Bul (Polydor 2382003), within Min Bul
- 1971: Actions (Wergo SM 1010; Philips 6305153; on CD as Transparency TRANS00081971), with Krzystof Penderecki, Don Cherry & The New Eternal Rhythm Orchestra live in Donaueschingen
- 1971: New Violin Summit (MPS 3321285-8/MPS 88025-2/MPS2222720-0 - released on CD as Euro Series 468036 504), with Jean-Luc Ponty, Don "Sugarcane" Harris, Michał Urbaniak, Nipso Brantner, Wolfgang Dauner, Neville Whitehead, Robert Wyatt) 1971
- 1971: Popofoni (Sonet SLP 1421,2), with Karin Krog, Jan Garbarek, et al.
- 1973: Real Rock 'N' Roll (Philips 6317013), with Per "Elvis" Granberg and The New Jordal Swingers
- 1975: New Jazz Festival - Hamburg 1975, with various artists
- 1976: The Hapless Child (Watt/4), with Michael Mantler and Edward Gorey
- 1976: No Time for Time (Zarepta ZA 34005/Sonet SLP1437), with Pål Thowsen & Jon Christensen
- 1976: Samse Tak! (Egil "Bop" Johansen) (Four Leaf FLC 5013) 1976
- 1976: Dream (Karusell 2915 066), within The Dream (including Hans Marius Stormoen, Tom Karlsen & Christian Reim)
- 1977: Bruksdikt for Deg og Meg (Polydor 2920 172), with Carl Frederik Prytz
- 1978: Three Day Moon (ECM 1123), with Barre Phillips
- 1980: Apecalypso Nå (Polydor 2382 112), with Lars Mjøen and Knut Lystad
- 1985: Bratislava Jazz Days 1985 (Opus Czechoslovakia 9115 1810-11, two-LP set)
- 1987: Nice Guys (Norwegian label?), with Hungry John and The Blue Shadows
- 1988: Natt Jazz 20 År (Grappa Music GRCD 103), with various artists
- 1990: Contemporary Music for Big Band (SSCD 002), with Sandvika Storband
- 1990: Vegmerker (Pro Musica PP9022), with Trondhjems Studentersangforening
- 1991: Mnaomai, Mnomai (ECM 1378), with Heinz Reber
- 1993: Unplugged: Mozart and Rypdal (MTG-CD 21111), with Hans Petter Bonden
- 1994: Deep Harmony, with Tomra Brass Band
- 1995: Come Together: Guitar Tribute To The Beatles, Vol. 2, with various artists
- 1997: Bitt (Polygram 5365832), with Audun Kleive
- 1997: Meridians (ACT 9263-2), with Torbjørn Sunde
- 1997: Road Song (Villa Records AS VRCD 005), with Knut Mikalsen's Bopalong Quintet
- 1999: Dawn of a New Century (Mercury Records 538 838–2), with Secret Garden
- 1999: Snøfreser'n/FBI (Spinner Records GTIS 704 - CD single), with Øystein Sunde
- 2000: Kartā (ECM 1704), with Markus Stockhausen, with Arild Andersen & Patrice Héral
- 2000: Song....Tread Lightly (Sony Denmark CK 91439), with Palle Mikkelborg
- 2000: Navigations (Simax Classics PSC 1212), with Kyberia
- 2000: Open The Door Softly (ExLibris EXLCD 30079), with Helen Davis
- 2002: Sonata / Nimbus (MTG Record Company; A Corda), with Birgitte Stærnes
- 2002: Magica Lanterna, with Ronni Le Tekrø
- 2003: Kahlil Gibran's "The Prophet"
