= Bjørn Kjellemyr =

Norwegian double bassist (1950–2025)

- Born: 4 December 1950; Bamble Municipality, Norway
- Died: 9 August 2025 (aged 74)
- Genre: Jazz
- Occupation: Musician
- Instrument: Double bass
- Years active: 1974–2025
- Label: ECM
- Formerly of: Terje Rypdal & The Chasers

Bjørn Kjellemyr (4 December 1950 – 9 August 2025) was a Norwegian jazz double bassist, known from a variety of musical contexts like Terje Rypdal & The Chasers, Joe Henderson, Bob Berg, Chet Baker, Art Farmer, Pat Metheny, Mike Stern, Dag Arnesen, Knut Riisnæs, Jon Eberson, Bugge Wesseltoft, Audun Kleive, Jon Balke, Jan Gunnar Hoff and Ketil Bjørnstad.

== Life and career ==
Kjellemyr played bass in local rock bands in the Skien area, while he explored the jazz with pianist Rune Klakegg and joined in Guttorm Guttormsen's Big band and Quartet, with performances at the Norwegian Jazz Association's anniversary concerts in 1973 and Moldejazz Festival 1974. He moved to Oslo and studied at Norges Musikkhøgskole (1974–78).

Kjellemyr lived in Bergen from 1978 to 1980 and was employed at Musikkselskabet Philharmonic Orchestra, and was part of Dag Arnesen Trio and Sextet 1978–79, Søbstad/Arnesen Quartet 1979–80, and appeared at different festivals with such as Jon Balke, Jon Eberson and Erling Aksdal, and actually performed at every «Moldejazz» from 1974.

He participated in a number of different jazz groups including with Knut Riisnæs, Jon Eberson, Bugge Wesseltoft, Audun Kleive, Jon Balke, Jan Gunnar Hoff, Ketil Bjørnstad, and was particularly known for his long collaboration with guitarist Terje Rypdal. Kjellemyr played with a series of international jazz greats like Joe Henderson, Bob Berg, Chet Baker, Art Farmer, Pat Metheny and Mike Stern. The bassist contributed on a large number of recordings, among others on the ECM label. He also played with singers/songwriters Kari Bremnes, Jan Eggum, Anne Grete Preus and Karoline Krüger.

Kjellemyr received the "Jazz Musician of the Year" (1990) and "Buddy Prize" (1994). He was employed at the 2005 Norges Musikkhøgskole as associate professor at the department of jazz and improvised music.

With the orchestra Metropolitan he released two albums, Metropolitan (1999) and Love Is Blind (2004). "Metropolitan" is Beate S. Lech, Jon Eberson, Morten Halle, Pål Thowsen and Rob Waring in addition to Kjellemyr.

He was an improviser who was comfortable with different musical environments basis. From 1998 he appeared in concerts and recordings with lutenist Rolf Lislevand and his improv/baroque ensembles. Latest recording on ECM with this ensemble in 2008 "Diminuito".

Kjellemyr died on 9 August 2025, at the age of 74.

== Honors ==
- 1990: "Jazz Musician of the Year", by The Association of Norwegian jazz musicians
- 1994: Buddyprisen, by the Norwegian Jazz Forum

== Discography (in selection) ==
With Knut Riisnæs Quartet

- 1982: Flukt (Odin Records), with Dag Arnesen & Jon Christensen

With Chet Baker

- The Improviser (Cadence Jazz, 1983)

With Terje Rypdal

- 1985: Chaser (ECM Records), with Terje Rypdal & The Chasers
- 1987: Blue (ECM Records), with Terje Rypdal & The Chasers
- 1989: The Singles Collection (ECM Records), with Terje Rypdal & The Chasers
- 1993: Q.E.D. (ECM Records)
- 1995: If Mountains Could Sing (ECM Records)
- 2006: Vossabrygg (ECM Records), commissioned work at Vossajazz 2003

With Jon Eberson

- 1985: Stories (CBS Records), Jon Eberson Band
- 1987: Stash (Odin Records), Trio with Audun Kleive
- 1990: Blow! (Odin Records), with Morten Halle & Finn Sletten
- 1992: 2 (Curling Legs), with Morten Halle & Finn Sletten
- 1993: Live At Rockefeller (Odin Records), with Jazzpunkensemblet
- 1997: Thirteen Rounds (Curling Legs), with "Jazzpunkensemblet"

With Knut Kristiansen

- 1987: Monk Memorial

With Ab und Zu

- 1993: Den akustiske skygge

With Dag Arnesen

- 1989: Renascent (Odin Records), Trio with Svein Christiansen
- 1990: The day after (Taurus), Quintet with Wenche Gausdal, Odd Riisnæs and Svein Christiansen

With Jan Gunnar Hoff

- 1991: Syklus (Odin Records)
- 1995: Moving (Curling Legs)
- 1996: Crosslands (Curling Legs)

With Ketil Bjørnstad

- 1993: Water Stories (ECM Records)
- 2004: Seafarer's Song (Universal Music Norway, EmArcy)
- 2010: Hvalenes sang (Grappa Music)

With Berit Opheim

- 1998: Fryd (Curling Legs), with Einar Mjølsnes, Per Jørgensen & Sigbjørn Apeland
- 2005: Ein Song Frå Dei Utsunge Stunder (Vossajazz Records), with "BNB" (Nils Økland)

With Metropolitan

- 1999: Metropolitan (Columbia Records)
- 2004: Love Is Blind (Curling Legs), with strings

With Oslo 13

- 2001: Live In The North (Curling Legs)

With Kristin Skaare

- 2008: Var (Grammofon)

With Tore Johansen

- 2008: Giving (Inner Ear)
- 2009: Jazz Mass (Inner Ear)

With Geir Lysne Ensemble

- 2009: The Grieg Code (ACT)

With "Northern Arc"

- 2012: Northern Arc (Curling Legs)

With Chamber projects

- 1992: Borealis (Aurora), with "Borealis"
- 2006: Nuove musiche, with Rolf Lislevand
- 2009: Diminuito, with Rolf Lislevand

Awards
Preceded by Egil Johansen	Recipient of the Buddyprisen; 1994	Succeeded by Per Jørgensen
