= Chaser =

Chaser(s) or The Chaser(s) may refer to:

== Animals ==
- Chaser (dragonfly), a genus of dragonflies, Libellula
- Chaser (dog) (2004–2019), an American Border Collie dog
- Chaser, a horse trained for steeple-chasing

== Entertainment ==
=== Film ===
- The Chaser (1928 film), an American comedy film
- The Chaser (1938 film), an American comedy drama film
- The Chasers (1959 film), a Norwegian film
- The Chasers (1965 film), a Swedish film
- Chasers, a 1994 American comedy film
- The Chaser (2008 film), a South Korean action-thriller

=== Music ===
- Chaser (album), by Terje Rypdal, 1985
  - The Chasers, backing musicians for Rypdal; see Terje Rypdal discography
- Chaser, an EP by Femtanyl, 2023
- Chasers (soundtrack), from the 1995 film
- "The Chaser" (song), by Infinite, 2012

=== Television ===
- The Chaser (TV series), a 2012 South Korean drama series
- "The Chaser" (The Twilight Zone), a 1960 episode
- The Chasers, the resident experts on the British quiz show The Chase and international versions

=== Other entertainment ===
- Chaser (video game), a 2003 sci-fi first person shooter
- Chaser, or Smoker, a character in One Piece comic books
- The Chaser, an Australian satirical comedy group
  - The Chaser (newspaper), a 1999–2005 Australian satirical newspaper
- The Chaser, a character in the video game Slender: The Arrival
- Chasers (novel), a 2010 Being Human novel by Mark Michalowski

== Technology ==
- Chaser or Chase gun, a cannon mounted in the bow or stern of a sailing ship
- Chaser (1786 ship), a British ship
- HMS Chaser (D32), an aircraft carrier
- Toyota Chaser, an automobile
- Cosmik Chaser, a British ultralight trike design

== Fetishization ==
- Chubby chaser, a slang term for a person attracted to overweight or obese people
- Trans chaser, often shortened to chaser, a slang term for a person attracted to transgender people

== Other uses ==
- Chaser (bartending), a drink taken after a shot of hard liquor
- Chaser, a person who carries out the metalwork craft of repoussé and chasing

== See also ==
- Submarine chaser
- Chase (disambiguation)
- Pahonia (disambiguation)
