= Dark Wood =

Studio album by David Darling
- Released: 1995
- Recorded: July 1993
- Studio: Rainbow Studio; Oslo, Norway
- Genre: Jazz
- Length: 44:09
- Label: ECM; ECM 1519
- Producer: Manfred Eicher

David Darling chronology
Eight String Religion (1993)	Dark Wood (1995)	Window Steps (1996)

Dark Wood is a solo album by cellist David Darling recorded in July 1993 and released on ECM in 1995—Darling's third solo release for the label, following Journal October (1979) and Cello (1992).

== Reception ==
The AllMusic review by Rick Anderson awarded the album 3 stars stating "However mannered the presentation may be, though, this music is really stunning. All of it moves slowly, like a dark cloud formation, as spare lines pile up on one other and pizzicato sections nudge up against long, sustained tones... Highly recommended."

Professional ratings
Review scores
Source	Rating
AllMusic	3/5 stars

== Track listing ==
All compositions by David Darling

1. "Darkwood IV: Dawn" - 5:16
2. "Darkwood IV: In Motion" - 4:18
3. "Darkwood IV: Journey" - 5:13
4. "Darkwood V: Light" - 1:05
5. "Darkwood V: Earth" - 4:33
6. "Darkwood V: Passage" - 0:55
7. "Darkwood VI: Beginning" - 2:10
8. "Darkwood VI: Up Side Down" - 2:00
9. "Darkwood VI: Searching" - 2:53
10. "Darkwood VI: Medieval Dance" - 3:53
11. "Darkwood VII: The Picture" - 3:51
12. "Darkwood VII: Returning" - 3:12
13. "Darkwood VII: New Morning" - 5:09

== Personnel ==
- David Darling – cello
