= The Singles Collection (Terje Rypdal album) =

Studio album by Terje Rypdal
- Released: 1989
- Recorded: August 1988
- Studio: Rainbow Studio; Oslo, Norway
- Genre: Jazz fusion
- Length: 37:31
- Label: ECM; ECM 1383
- Producer: Manfred Eicher

Terje Rypdal chronology
Blue (1987)	The Singles Collection (1989)	Undisonus (1990)

The Singles Collection is an album by Norwegian jazz guitarist Terje Rypdal recorded in August 1988 and released on ECM the following year. The quartet features keyboardist Allan Dangerfield and Chasers rhythm section Bjørn Kjellemyr and Audun Kleive.

== Reception ==
Professional ratings
Review scores
Source	Rating
AllMusic	4/5 stars

The AllMusic review by Michael P. Dawson awarded the album 4 stars stating "The title is a joke: this is actually the third album by the Chasers."

== Track listing ==
All compositions by Terje Rypdal except as indicated

1. "There Is a Hot Lady in My Bedroom and I Need a Drink" - 4:27
2. "Sprøtt" - 4:37
3. "Mystery Man" - 4:42
4. "The Last Hero" (Allan Dangerfield) - 2:37
5. "Strange Behaviour" (Dangerfield) - 3:01
6. "U.'N.I." - 5:36
7. "Coyote" (Dangerfield) - 2:53
8. "Somehow, Somewhere" - 3:02
9. "Steady" - 4:09
10. "Crooner Song" - 2:51

== Personnel ==
- Terje Rypdal – electric guitar
- Allan Dangerfield – keyboards, synclavier
- Bjørn Kjellemyr – acoustic bass, electric bass
- Audun Kleive – drums
