= Iver Kleive =

Norwegian composer and organist (born 1949)

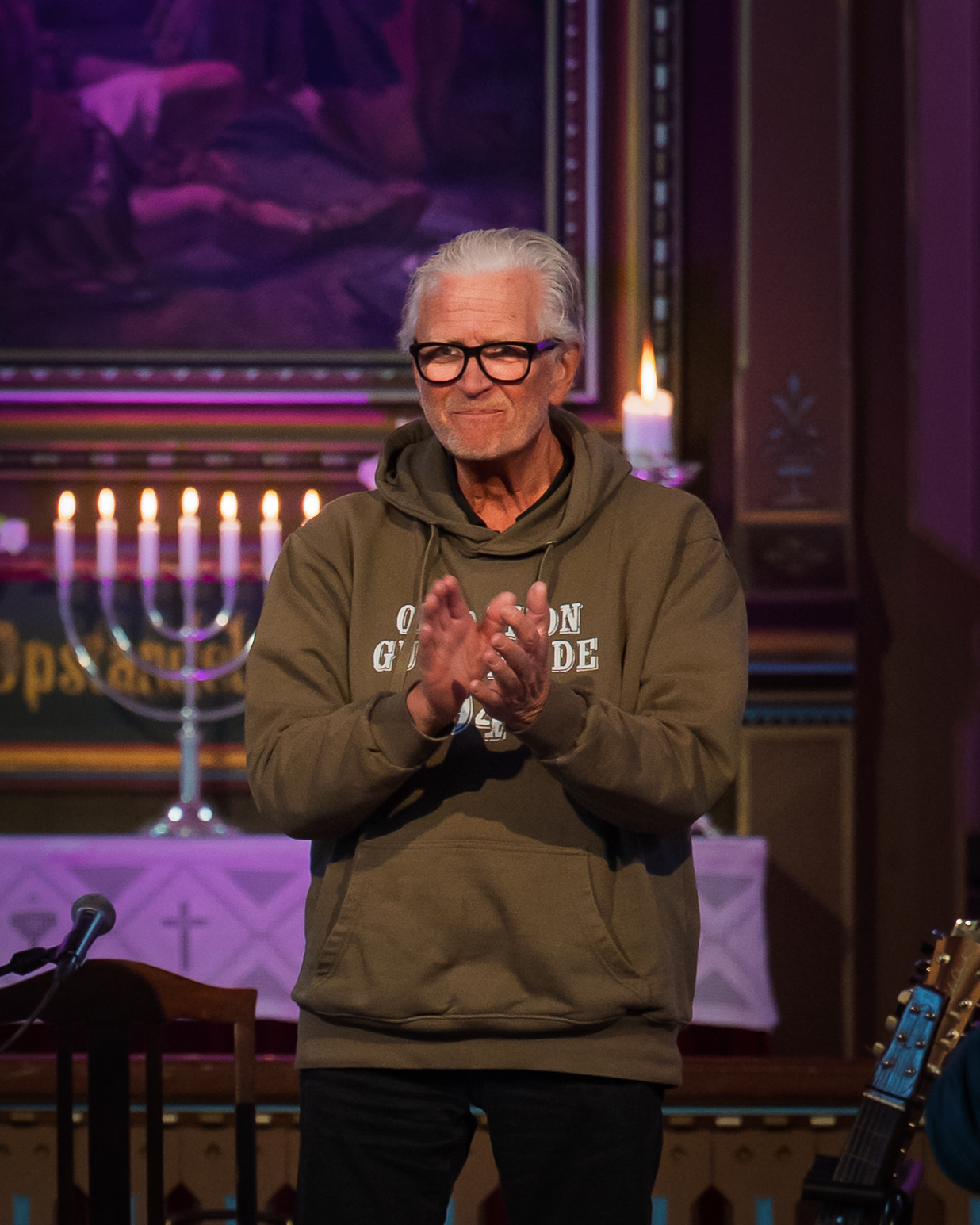
- Kleive after a church concert with Knut Reiersrud, June 2025

Background information
- Born: 25 May 1949 (age 76); Skien, Telemark
- Origin: Norway
- Genres: Jazz, church music
- Occupation(s): Musician, composer
- Instrument(s): Keyboards, church organ
- Website: www.kalleklev.no/artists/1-artists/1432-knut-reiersrud--iver-kleive.html

Iver Kleive (born 25 May 1949 in Skien, Norway) is a Norwegian composer and organist. He is known for his composing style which is a fusion of traditional church music with other musical idioms such as blues, jazz, and Norwegian folk music. He has appeared in nearly 200 recordings as a studio musician, composer and arranger.

== Biography ==
Kleive was born in Skien to a musical family. His father, Kristoffer Kleive, was also an organist and his brother, Audun Kleive, is a noted jazz percussionist. He studied church music and organ at the Norwegian Academy of Music in Oslo and then served as the organist at the Frogner Church from 1976 to 1981 and the Røyken Church from 1982 to 1985. Since 1987 he has been the musical director of the Helgerud Church in Bærum. He is also director of the Oslo Bach Choir which he founded in 1988. The recording of his Blå koral (Blue Chorale) won a Spellemannprisen in 1991.

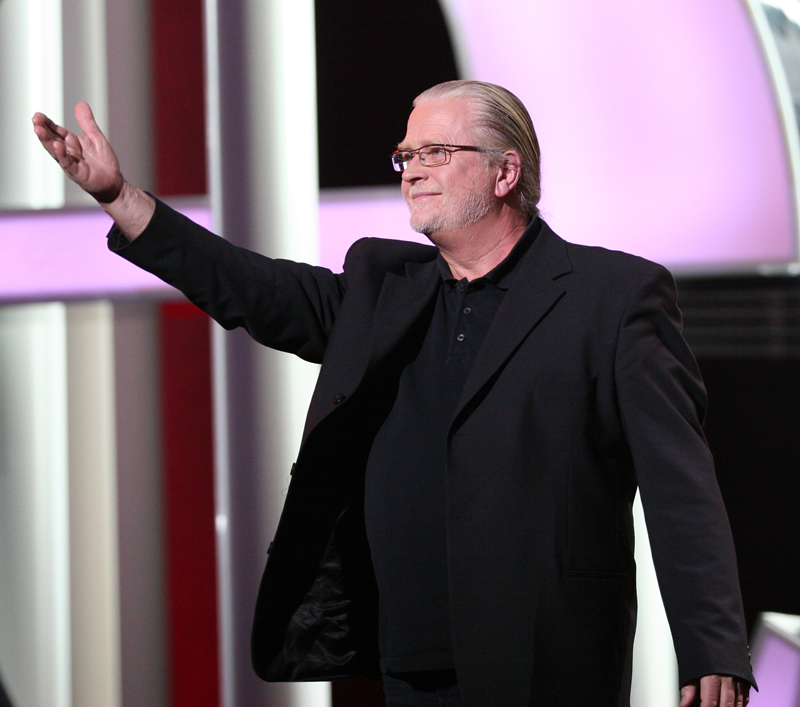
Iver Kleive performing at the Nobel Peace Prize Concert in Oslo 2008.

== Principal discography ==
Kleive records primarily on the Kirkelig Kulturverksted label (KKV). His principal recordings include:

=== Solo albums ===
- 1988: Max Reger – Inferno, Symphonic Fantasia and Fugue for organ, Op. 57 (KKV)
- 1993: Max Reger – Alle Menschen müssen sterben, Chorale fantasia, Op. 52/1 (KKV)
- 1994: Kyrie (KKV)
- 1998: Juleevangeliet / The Christmas Gospel (KKV)
- 2004: Hyrdenes Tilbedelse / Adoration of the Shepherds (KKV), meditations over famous Christmas songs
- 2007: Requiem (KKV)

=== Collaborative works ===
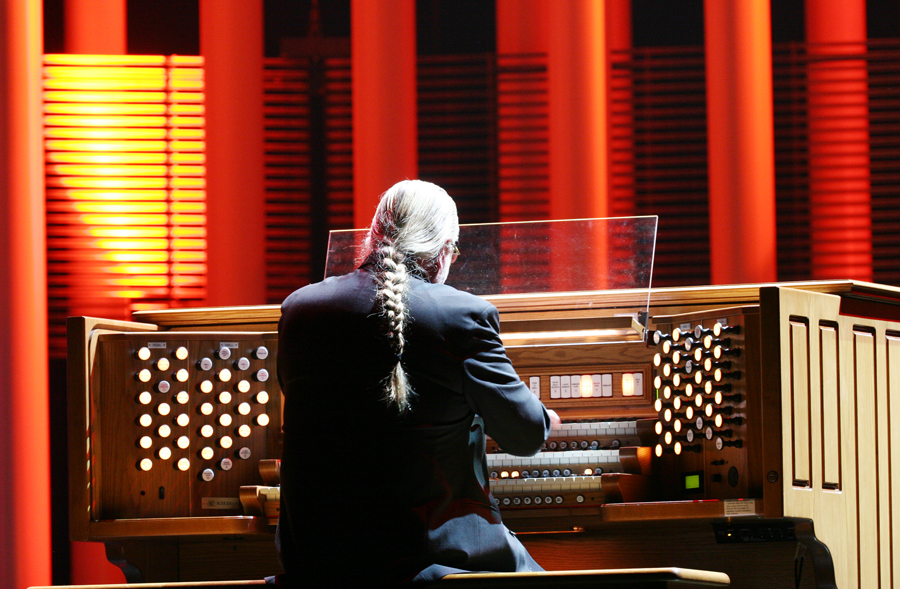
Kleive at the Nobel Peace Prize Concert 2008.

With Ingrid Elisabeth Johansen

- 1978: Ingrid Elisabeth (Sonet Records)

With Øystein Sunde

- 1979: Hærtata Hørt (Philips Records)

With Ole Paus

- 1981: Å, Sonja (Zarepta Records)

With Ove Røsbak and Sigmund Groven

- 1981: Lævandes Dikt (Viton)

With Per Egil Hovland

- 1983: Med Røtter I Himmelen (KKV)

With Roar Engelberg

- 1985: Alveland (KKV)

With Knut Reiersrud

- 1991: Blå Koral / Blue Chorale (KKV)
- 1996: Himmelskip / Ship of Heaven (KKV)
- 2000: Den Signede Dag / The Blessed Day (KKV), feat. folk singer Povl Dissing
- 2008: De Usynlige (2L), arranging and playing most of the soundtrack of the film "deUSYNLIGE" (N/SE/D)
- 2006: Nåde Over Nåde / Grace of Grace (KKV)

With Jonas Fjeld

- 1993: Texas Jensen (Stageway Records)

With Annbjørg Lien

- 1994: Felefeber (Grappa Music)

With Sigmund Groven

- 2001: Innunder Jul (Grappa Music)
- 2010: HarmOrgan (2L)

With Terje Rypdal

- 2002: Lux Aeterna (ECM Records), recorded in 2000

With Aage Kvalbein

- 2007: Julemeditasjoner / Christmas Meditations (KKV)
- 2008: Til Trøst / The Comforter (KKV)

With Sondre Bratland

- 1988: Inn i draumen
- 1992: Roså frå Betlehem

With Knut Reiersrud and Povl Dissing

- 2013: Som Den Gylne Sol (KKV)

== Sources ==
- Dalane, Anders, "Iver Kleive", Store norske leksikon
- Ellingham, Mark et al. (eds), World Music: Africa, Europe and the Middle East, Rough Guides, 1999. ISBN 1-85828-635-2
- Marcussen, Tor, "«Requiem» til gjensidig trøst", Aftenposten, 30 October 2007
