= Pogonia =

Pogonia may refer to:

- Pogonia (plant), a genus of orchids
- Pogonia, one of the names of the coat of arms of Lithuania since the early 15th century
- Pogonia coat of arms, a Polish coat of arms

== See also ==
- Pogoniani
- Pahonia (disambiguation)
- Pogoń Ruska
