= If Mountains Could Sing =

Studio album by Terje Rypdal
- Released: 1995
- Recorded: January and June 1994
- Genre: Jazz
- Length: 47:55
- Label: ECM; ECM 1554
- Producer: Manfred Eicher

Terje Rypdal chronology
Q.E.D. (1991)	If Mountains Could Sing (1995)	Skywards (1996)

If Mountains Could Sing is an album by Norwegian jazz guitarist Terje Rypdal, recorded in January and June 1994 and released on ECM the following year. The trio features rhythm section Bjørn Kjellemyr and Audun Kleive backed by a string trio conducted by Christian Eggen.

== Reception ==
The AllMusic review awarded the album 3 stars.

Professional ratings
Review scores
Source	Rating
AllMusic	3/5 stars

== Track listing ==
All compositions by Terje Rypdal

1. "The Return of Per Ulv" – 5:03
2. "It's in the Air" – 4:04
3. "But on the Other Hand" – 5:07
4. "If Mountains Could Sing" – 5:15
5. "Private Eye" – 5:47
6. "Foran Peisen" – 4:26
7. "Dancing Without Reindeers" – 3:27
8. "One for the Roadrunner" – 5:03
9. "Blue Angel" – 3:05
10. "Genie" – 3:47
11. "Lonesome Guitar" – 2:51

== Personnel ==
- Terje Rypdal – electric guitars
- Bjørn Kjellemyr – bass
- Audun Kleive – drums
- Christian Eggen – conductor
  - Terje Tønnesen – violin
  - Lars Anders Tomter – viola
  - Øystein Birkeland – cello
