= Dream Chasers =

Dream Chasers, Dream-chaser, or Dreamchasers may refer to:

== Meek Mill related ==
- Dream Chasers Records, record label founded by Meek Mill in 2012
- Dreamchasers series of mixtapes by Meek Mill
  - Dreamchasers 1, 2011 mixtape by Meek Mill
  - Dreamchasers 2, 2012 mixtape by Meek Mill
  - Dreamchasers 3, 2013 mixtape by Meek Mill
  - DC4, 2016 mixtape by Meek Mill

== Other ==
- Dreamchaser, 2013 album by Sarah Brightman
- Dream Chaser (album), 2026 album by Willie Nelson
- Dream Chaser, Sierra-Nevada Corporation spaceplane
- Dream-Chaser, a book by Sherrilyn Kenyon about the Dream-Hunters

== See also ==
- Dream (disambiguation)
- Chaser (disambiguation)
- Dreamchasing, a charity founded by Ron Dennis
- Dreamchase Farm, a pasturage operated by the non-profit Old Friends Equine
- Chasing Dreams (disambiguation)
- Chasing the Dream (disambiguation)
