= Music for People =

Music for People may refer to:

- Music for People (album), a 2000 album by the band VAST
- Music for People (organization), a non-profit organization dedicated to music-making and music improvisation as a means of self-expression

== See also ==
- Music for the People (disambiguation)
