= Skywards (album) =

Studio album by Terje Rypdal
- Released: 1997
- Recorded: February 1996
- Genre: Jazz, jazz fusion
- Length: 49:48
- Label: ECM; ECM 1608
- Producer: Manfred Eicher

Terje Rypdal chronology
If Mountains Could Sing (1994)	Skywards (1997)	Rypdal & Tekrø (1997)

Skywards is an album by guitarist Terje Rypdal recorded in February 1996 and released on ECM the following year. The septet features trumpeter Palle Mikkelborg, violinist Terje Tønnesen, cellist David Darling, pianist Christian Eggen, and drummers Paolo Vinaccia and Jon Christensen.

== Reception ==
The AllMusic review by Thom Jurek awarded the album 3 stars stating "Skywards is Rypdal's most openly schizophrenic yet satisfyingly ambitious work in many years."

Professional ratings
Review scores
Source	Rating
AllMusic	3/5 stars

== Track listing ==
All compositions by Terje Rypdal

1. "Skywards" - 4:03
2. "Into the Wilderness" - 7:35
3. "It's Not Over Until the Fat Lady Sings!" - 4:29
4. "The Pleasure Is Mine, I'm Sure" - 3:12
5. "Out of This World (Sinfonietta)" - 16:01
6. "Shining" - 5:42
7. "Remember to Remember" - 8:44

== Personnel ==
- Terje Rypdal – electric guitar
- Palle Mikkelborg – trumpet
- Terje Tønnesen – violin
- David Darling – cello
- Christian Eggen – piano, keyboards
- Paolo Vinaccia – drums, percussion
- Jon Christensen – drums
