= Descendre =

Studio album by Terje Rypdal
- Released: 1980
- Recorded: March 1979
- Studios: Talent Studio; Oslo, Norway
- Genre: Jazz
- Length: 44:48
- Label: ECM 1144
- Producer: Manfred Eicher

Terje Rypdal chronology
Terje Rypdal / Miroslav Vitous / Jack DeJohnette (1979)	Descendre (1980)	To Be Continued (1981)

Descendre is the ninth album by Norwegian jazz guitarist Terje Rypdal recorded in 1979 and released on the ECM label. The trio features trumpeter Palle Mikkelborg and drummer Jon Christensen.

== Reception ==
The AllMusic review by Michael P. Dawson awarded the album 4 stars stating "The unusual trio form of guitar, trumpet, and drums makes for some gorgeous floating sounds".

Professional ratings
Review scores
Source	Rating
Allmusic	4/5 stars
The Rolling Stone Jazz Record Guide	3/5 stars

== Track listing ==
All compositions by Terje Rypdal

1. "Avskjed" - 5:44
2. "Circles" - 11:15
3. "Descendre" - 3:11
4. "Innseiling" - 7:57
5. "Men of Mystery" - 8:25
6. "Speil" - 8:25

== Personnel ==
- Terje Rypdal – electric guitar, keyboards, flute
- Palle Mikkelborg – trumpet, flugelhorn, keyboards
- Jon Christensen – drums, percussion
