= Chasing the Dream =

Chasing the Dream may refer to:

- Chasing the Dream (album), 2014 album by Canadian heavy metal band Skull Fist
- The Cutting Edge: Chasing the Dream, 2008 romantic-comedy film
- Hank Aaron: Chasing the Dream, 1995 documentary film.
- F2: Chasing the Dream, a docuseries following the FIA Formula 2 Championship
- Chasing the Dream: A Midlife Quest for Fame and Fortune on the Pro Golf Circuit, 1997 book by Harry Hurt III
- Chasing the Dream, a series produced by WNET

== See also ==
- Chasing a Dream (Miles from Nowhere), 2009 telefilm
- Dream Chasing (book), a 2011 autobiography by Shiva Balak Misra
- Dreamchasing, a charity founded by Ron Dennis
- Chasing Dreams (disambiguation)
- Dream Chasers (disambiguation)
