= Lux Aeterna (Terje Rypdal album) =

Live album by Terje Rypdal
- Released: 2002
- Recorded: July 19, 2000
- Venue: Moldejazz; Molde Domirke
- Genre: Jazz
- Length: 60:43
- Label: ECM; ECM 1818
- Producer: Manfred Eicher

Terje Rypdal chronology
Double Concerto / 5th Symphony (1999)	Lux Aeterna (2002)	Vossabrygg (2005)

Lux Aeterna is a live album by Norwegian guitarist Terje Rypdal recorded at Moldejazz in Molde, Norway on July 19, 2000 and released on ECM in 2002. Rypdal is backed by trumpeter Palle Mikkelborg, organist Iver Kleive, singer Åshild Stubø Gundersen, and the Bergen Chamber Ensemble conducted by Kjell Seim.

== Reception ==
Professional ratings
Review scores
Source	Rating
AllMusic	4.5/5 stars

The AllMusic review by Thom Jurek awarded the album 4½ stars stating "There is nothing remotely cold about this work; it is warm and dark and stunning in its stark presentation that is so deceptively complex. By the time the fifth and title movement commences, the listener has been to many worlds within the sonorous terrains of the heart... Terje Rypdal is making the greatest music of his life."

== Track listing ==
All tracks are written by Terje Rypdal

No.	Title	Length
1.	"1st Movement: Luminous Galaxy"	15:51
2.	"2nd Movement: Orchestral Interlude"	11:28
3.	"3rd Movement: Fjelldåpen"	7:22
4.	"4th Movement: Organ Interlude"	10:44
5.	"5th Movement: Lux Aeterna"	15:20

== Personnel ==
- Terje Rypdal – electric guitar
- Palle Mikkelborg – trumpet
- Iver Kleive – church organ
- Åshild Stubø Gundersen – soprano
- Kjell Seim – conductor
  - Bergen Chamber Ensemble
    - Thorstein Tellnes – piano
    - Elise Båtnes (leader), Annar Follesø, Ellisiv Sollesnes, Harald Blø & Jon Flølo – first violin
    - Elisabeth Svanes, Elna Føleide Selle, Geir Atle Stangenes & Gunnvor Holtlien – second violin
    - Anders Rensvik, Hans Gunnar Hagen & Nils Olav Solberg – viola
    - Bodil Erdal & Gunn Berit Kleiveland – cello
    - Adam Kieszek – bass
    - Ellen Bredesen-Vestby, Ivar Kolve – percussion
