= To Be Continued (Terje Rypdal album) =

Studio album by Terje Rypdal
- Released: 1981
- Recorded: January 1981
- Studio: Talent Studio; Oslo, Norway
- Genre: Jazz
- Length: 42:59
- Label: ECM 1192
- Producer: Manfred Eicher

Terje Rypdal chronology
Descendre (1979)	To Be Continued (1981)	Eos (1984)

Terje Rypdal / Miroslav Vitous / Jack DeJohnette chronology
Terje Rypdal / Miroslav Vitous / Jack DeJohnette (1978)	To Be Continued (1981)

To Be Continued is an album by guitarist Terje Rypdal recorded in January 1981 and released on ECM later that same year. The trio features rhythm section Miroslav Vitous and Jack DeJohnette—the second album by the trio, following their 1978 self-titled album.

== Reception ==
The AllMusic review by Paul Collins awarded the album 4½ stars stating "Essentially a continuation of Rypdal Vitous DeJohnette, this album somewhat lacks the atmospheric keyboards of its predecessor. It is nonetheless quite compelling."

Professional ratings
Review scores
Source	Rating
AllMusic	4.5/5 stars
The Rolling Stone Jazz Record Guide	3/5 stars

== Track listing ==
All compositions by Terje Rypdal except as indicated

1. "Maya" - 10:18
2. "Mountain in the Clouds" (Miroslav Vitous) - 4:57
3. "Morning Lake" (Vitous) - 7:28
4. "To Be Continued" (Jack DeJohnette) - 9:12
5. "This Morning" (DeJohnette, Vitous, Rypdal) - 5:24
6. "Topplue, Votter & Skjerf" - 3:48
7. "Uncomposed Appendix" - 1:52

== Personnel ==
- Terje Rypdal – electric guitars, flute
- Miroslav Vitous – acoustic bass, electric bass, piano
- Jack DeJohnette – drums, voice
