= Undisonus =

Undisonus / Ineo

Studio album by Terje Rypdal
- Released: 1990
- Recorded: September 1986 and November 1987
- Genre: Contemporary classical music
- Length: 40:07
- Label: ECM; ECM 1389
- Producer: Manfred Eicher

Terje Rypdal chronology
The Singles Collection (1989)	Undisonus / Ineo (1990)	Q.E.D. (1991)

Undisonus for Violin and Orchestra / Ineo for Choir and Chamber Orchestra is an album of contemporary classical music composed by Norwegian guitarist and composer Terje Rypdal recorded in September 1986 and November 1987 respectively and released on ECM in 1990.

== Reception ==
The AllMusic review by Paul Collins awarded the album 4 stars stating "Those accustomed to Rypdal's jazz and jazz-rock albums may be startled when they discover his extensive work in orchestral composition, although in some ways Rypdal seems to take these pieces closest to heart."

Professional ratings
Review scores
Source	Rating
AllMusic	4/5 stars

== Track listing ==
All compositions by Terje Rypdal

1. "Undisonus Op. 23 for Violin and Orchestra" – 21:40
2. "Ineo Op. 29 for Choir and Chamber Orchestra" – 18:27

== Personnel ==
=== Undisonus ===
- Terje Tønnesen – violin
- Christian Eggen – conductor
  - Royal Philharmonic Orchestra
  - Recorded at St. Peter's Church in Morden, London in September 1986

=== Ineo ===
- Grex Vocalis – vocals
- Christian Eggen – conductor
  - The Rainbow Orchestra
  - Recorded at Rainbow Studio in Oslo, Norway in November 1987
