= Prayer for Compassion =

Studio album by David Darling
- Released: January 20, 2009
- Genre: New-age
- Length: 43:46
- Label: Curve Blue
- Producer: Mickey Houlihan, David Darling

Prayer for Compassion is an album by David Darling, released through the record label Wind Over the Earth in 2009. In 2010, the album won Darling a Grammy Award for Best New Age Album.

== Track listing ==
All songs by David Darling.

1. "Untold Stories", for cello and ambient sounds – 4:49
2. "Prayer for Compassion", for cello, chorus and ambient sounds – 4:18
3. "Stones Start Spinning", for cello and ambient sounds – 4:15
4. "As Long as Grasses Grow and Rivers Run", for cello, flute and ambient sound – 3:44
5. "Music of a Desire", for cello and ambient sounds – 2:48
6. "Remembering Our Mothers", for cello and ambient sounds – 3:19
7. "Beautiful Life", for cello, kalimba and ambient sounds – 2:36
8. "War Is Outdated", for cello and ambient sounds – 4:09
9. "September Morn", for cello, voice and ambient sounds – 4:35
10. "Shoe Strings", for cello and ambient sounds – 2:50
11. "Heaven Here on Earth", for cello and ambient sounds – 2:20
12. "When We Forgive", for cello and ambient sounds – 4:03

== Personnel ==
- Members of Ars Nova Choir – choir, chorus
- Tom Bates – arranger, editing, mixing, recording
- David Channing – arranger, editing, mixing, recording
- David Darling – cello, piano, voice, composer, liner notes, producer
- Joseph Fire Crow – flute
- Ben Harris – assistant engineer
- Mickey Houlihan – mixing, producer, recording
- Justin Konrad – assistant engineer
- Dominick Maita – mastering
- Samite Mulondo – kalimba
- Adam Olson – assistant engineer
- Tommy Skarupa – assistant engineer
- Michael Verdick – arranger, editing, mixing, recording
- Steve Vidaic – assistant engineer
- Susan Wasinger – art direction, design
- Mike Yach – assistant engineer
- Steve Van Zandt – assistant engineer
