= Blue (Terje Rypdal album) =

Studio album by Terje Rypdal & the Chasers
- Released: 1987
- Recorded: November 1986
- Studios: Rainbow Studio; Oslo, Norway
- Genres: Jazz fusion, space rock, ambient
- Length: 35:28
- Label: ECM 1346
- Producer: Manfred Eicher

Terje Rypdal chronology
| Chaser (1985) | Blue (1987) | The Singles Collection (1989) |

Blue is an album by Terje Rypdal and the Chasers, recorded in 1986 and released on the ECM label. Rypdal's Chasers Trio features rhythm section Bjørn Kjellemyr and Audun Kleive.

== Reception ==
Professional ratings
Review scores
| Source | Rating |
|---|---|
| AllMusic | 4.5/5 stars |

The AllMusic review by Thom Jurek awarded the album 4½ stars, stating:

One of the primary attributes of Blue is its sequencing; the entire recording seems to unfold endlessly and seamlessly. Nothing is rushed, and all parts and players contribute economically. The band establishes a textural point of view to improvise from in every selection, and doesn't seem to be hindered by the guitar-bass-drums limitation. Each track appears to reveal itself as a sound world, full of possibility and limitless space, giving the band a chance to offer itself to these compositions rather than just play them.

== Track listing ==
All compositions by Terje Rypdal except as indicated

1. "The Curse" - 1:26
2. Kompet går" (Bjørn Kjellemyr, Audun Kleive, Terje Rypdal) - 6:52
3. "I Disremember Quite Well" - 5:06
4. "Og hva synes vi om det" (Kjellemyr, Kleive, Rypdal) - 5:53
5. "Last Nite" - 3:30
6. "Blue" - 5:43
7. "Tanga" - 4:18
8. "Om bare" - 3:03

== Personnel ==
=== Terje Rypdal & the Chasers ===
- Terje Rypdal – electric guitar, keyboards
- Bjørn Kjellemyr – acoustic bass, electric bass
- Audun Kleive – drums, percussion
