= Jakob Terjesønn Rypdal =

- Born: 27 October 1989 (age 36); Oslo
- Origin: Norway
- Genres: Electronica
- Occupations: Musician, composer
- Instruments: Guitar, electronics

Jakob Terjesønn Rypdal (born 27 October 1989 in Oslo, Norway) is a Norwegian Electronica artist and guitarist.

== Career ==
Rypdal was raised in Tresfjord, Møre og Romsdal, where his musical education was well taken care of. He moved to Oslo, and in 2011 he is one of the guitarists in the specially written piece of music, composed for brass instruments, guitars and hundreds Harley Davidson engines, by his father Terje Rypdal. At the concert in Tønsberg in addition the TNT guitarist Ronni Le Tekrø joined in.

In 2015 he toured Norway with his half brother percussionist Marius Rypdal, backing the singer Sibeth Hoff. They create an exciting musical landscape by combining traditional craftsmanship musician with a playful electronic expression. He also released the album Maelstrom by his electronica project Manta Ray based in Oslo.

== Discography ==
Manta Ray

- 2015: Maelstrom (Single)
