= Humanitarian education =

Education

Humanitarian education teaches various social topics from a humanitarian perspective. A desire to reduce suffering, save lives and maintain human dignity is central to understanding humanitarian education. It is based on the assumption that people have an innate desire to help others, so is centrally concerned with our shared humanity.

== Definition and context ==
Humanitarian education is an area of learning that concentrates on the desire or impulse to save lives, protect human dignity and reduce suffering. It particularly relates to offering assistance to others in an emergency or crisis and is also used to refer to the skills, knowledge and attitudes needed for individuals and communities to help themselves. In the UK it may appear within curriculum subjects such as citizenship and personal, social, health and economic education. It began to be developed and encouraged in the UK by the British Red Cross during 2005.

== Goals and outcomes ==
The goal of humanitarian education is that communities increase their resilience and that individuals and groups are more confident, able and willing to help themselves and others when faced with a crisis.

== Curriculum content ==
By exploring crisis situations humanitarian education enables students to recognise that people can overcome adversity. It develops their understanding of humanitarian issues, the skills that build resilience and encourages them to intervene to support others in crisis.

The way in which educators explore with students any topic, issue or event must be within the framework of the principles of humanity and impartiality. It does not directly address causes and explicitly avoids exploring political, religious, social class, nationality, economic, environmental or other factors that might contribute to or create a crisis.

== Difference from other forms of education ==
Its origins in the International Red Cross and Red Crescent Movement mean that humanitarian education is sometimes confused with development education or global education, or simply teaching about the work of aid or development NGOs. Adherents also stress that humanitarian education is philosophically and practically distinct from human rights education, since the humanitarian impulse is founded on needs rather than rights or entitlement.

Humanitarian education is linked to, but distinct from, education about international humanitarian law, often referred to as the laws of war. Aspects of international humanitarian law are often topics within humanitarian education.

== See also ==
- Human rights education
- Humane education
- Humanistic education
- Vienna Declaration and Programme of Action
