= Chasers (soundtrack) =

Soundtrack album by various artists
- Released: August 29, 1995
- Length: 11 at 33:17
- Label: Morgan Creek

Chasers is the soundtrack from the film of the same name. It was released on August 29, 1995, by Morgan Creek. Dwight Yoakam and Pete Anderson were credited with music for the movie.

== Track listing ==
1. Dwight Yoakam - "Doin' What I Did" (Dwight Yoakam) - 3:28
2. Lonesome Strangers - "We Used to Fuss" (Jeff Rymes) - 2:13
3. Steve Pryor - "Atlas Blues" (The Steve Pryor Band) - 3:02
4. Dwight Yoakam - "Guitars, Cadillacs" (Dwight Yoakam) - 3:05
5. Bob Dorough & Victoria Duffy - "Right On My Way Home" (Bob Dorough/Lynn Gibson) - 3:48
6. Ralph Stanley - "Train 45" (T. LaRue) - 2:21
7. Meat Puppets - "Sam" (Curt Kirkwood) - 3:08
8. Buck Owens - "Cryin' Time" (Buck Owens) - 2:31
9. Tommy Conwell & The Young Rumblers - "Rock With You" (Tommy Conwell/
  The Young Rumblers) - 3:08
10. Lonesome Strangers - "Sharon" (Jeff Rymes) - 3:36
11. Jim Lauderdale - "Lucky 13" (Jim Lauderdale/John Messler) - 2:58
