= Music for the People =

Music for the People may refer to:

- Music for the People (The Enemy album), 2009
- Music for the People (Marky Mark and the Funky Bunch album), 1991
- Melbourne, Australia, live music program conducted by Hector Crawford

== See also ==
- Music for People (disambiguation)
