= Human rights education =

Education on the topic of human rights

Human rights education (HRE) is the learning process that seeks to build knowledge, values, and proficiency in the rights that each person is entitled to acquire. This education teaches students to examine their own experiences from a point of view that enables them to integrate these concepts into their values. Decision-making, and daily situations. According to Amnesty International, human rights education is a way to empower people by training them so that their skills and behaviors promote dignity and equality within their communities, societies, and throughout the world.

The "National Economics and Social Rights Initiative" stated the importance of nondiscrimination in human rights education. Governments must ensure that it is exercised without bias to race, gender, religion, language, national or social origin, political or personal opinion, birth, or any status. All students, parents and communities possess the right to take part in decisions affecting their respective schools and the right to education.

== History ==
The "Universal Declaration of Human Rights" states that basic human rights require protection and that every person is entitled to a certain base number of rights and freedoms through it.

The Asia-Pacific Center for Education for International Understanding (APCEIU) and the United Nations Academic Impact mutually organized the 2018 United Nations Global Citizenship Education Seminar at the UN Headquarters in New York City. These seminars help progress human rights education by bringing people together to form new ideas and concepts to improve the movement. Advocates for human rights education believe it is crucial because it imparts and spreads out the human rights vocabulary and provides students with the ability to take a critical approach towards human rights.

=== Progressing development ===
The Office of the High Commissioner for Human Rights (OHCHR) continues to promote human rights education by supporting national and local initiatives for human rights education within the context of its Technical Cooperation Programs and through the ACT Project which subsidizes the grassroots projects. The ACT or Assisting Communities Together Project is the collaboration between the OHCHR and the United Nations Development Program (UNDP) to support civil organizations that are implementing human rights activities in local communities. The OHCHR also takes care of coordinating the World Program for Human Rights Education. This is a more adaptable program, unlike the decade-long one. It focuses on a different issue every few years and tries to strengthen human rights education in a different way.

== Education ==
The OHCHR developed human rights education training materials and resource tools.

HRE has also started to be offered in the school curriculum. For example, linked subjects like History, Politics and Citizenship incorporated human rights training, as well as specialized courses offered as part of the International Baccalaureate Diploma program for high school students.

Some cities in the world have adopted legislation to stimulate successfully the human rights education in the public schools, as the example of the Municipal Plan of human rights education of the city of São Paulo (Decreto Nº 57.503, DE 6 DE Dezembro de 2016), in Brazil.

== Models ==
There are four models that emerged to help categorize human rights education in formal and informal education sectors: values and awareness, accountability, transformation, and socioecoethical. To help guide human rights education in the right direction, they set up "goals, target groups and other practical elements of educational programming, such as content and methodologies."

2. Accountability The Accountability Model is associated with the legal and political approach to human rights in which the learners that the model targets are already involved via professional roles. The model is incorporated by means of training and networking, covering topics such as court cases, codes of ethics, and how to deal with the media. This model is "linked with the individual and his or her professional role" and is, "oriented towards the infusion of human rights education within the training of government personnel so as to help ensure that they respect human rights in carrying out their responsibilities."

3. Transformational This model of education focuses on the psychological and sociological aspects of human rights. The topics towards which this model is effective are those including vulnerable populations and people with personal experiences affected by the topic, such as women and minorities. The model aims to empower the individual, such as those victims of abuse and trauma. The model is geared towards recognizing the abuse of human rights but is also committed to preventing these abuses. The transformational model, "highlights the empowerment of disadvantaged groups for organizing collectively, not only to carry out human rights activism but to carry forward social change more generally." It is, "more accurately described as promoting a goal of social change, incorporating both "activism" including collective action and community development as well as undertaking individual actions to reduce violations in one's personal life and immediate environment."

4. Socioecoethical Model of Human Rights Education Munir Moosa Sadruddin's developed a model to teach human rights. This tripartite model conjoins social, ecological, and ethrical (ethics and critical thinking) elements that interact dialectically for building resilience and supporting HRE practices. Recognizing the importance of sociocultural structures and self-actualization is crucial to embracing and practicing common rights. Similarly, developing an ecological identity through narratives offers insights into personal identity and relationships with social, cultural, political, and economic environments. Ethics, in this context, is an individual pursuit of critical selfdiscovery. While personal values evolve through experience and exposure, they are often rooted in social and relational identities. It requires individuals to take ownership and filter them through a multi-layered lens.

== United Nations ==
The United Nations High Commissioner for the Promotion and Protection of all Human Rights functions as coordinator of the UN Education and Public Information Programs in the area of human rights.

The United Nations General Assembly has proclaimed the Universal Declaration of Human Rights it as central to the achievement of the rights enshrined.

Article 26.2 of the Declaration identifies the role of educators in achieving the social order called for by the declaration as the promotion of positive social skills among societal and cultural groups.

Article 29 of the Convention on the Rights of the Child requires nation states to ensure that children are enabled to develop a respect for their own cultural identity, language and values and for the culture, language and values of others.

The United Nations' Vienna Declaration and Programme of Action of 1993 reaffirmed the importance of human rights, and, as a result. the decade from 1995 to 2004 was declared the UN Decade of Human Rights Education.

UNESCO accepts a responsibility to promote human rights education and was a key organizer of the UN's Decade for Human Rights Education. UNESCO attempts to promote human rights education through various means.

Following the Decade of Human Rights Education, on 10 December 2004, the General Assembly proclaimed the World Programme for Human Rights Education.

== Other organizations promoting human rights education ==
The Arab Organization for Human Rights is an independent Arab non-governmental organization based in Tunisia which aims to promote a culture of civil, political, economic, social and cultural human rights as enshrined in the Universal Declaration of Human Rights as well as international conventions, and to strengthen the values of democracy and citizenship. It was founded in 1989 and received the UNESCO International Award for Human Rights Education in 1992.

Organizations such as Indian Institute of Human Rights, Amnesty International and Human Rights Education Associates (HREA) promote human rights education with their programmes.

Human rights organizations aim to protect human rights on different levels some being more specific to geographical areas, others are based on governmental influences, others are nonprofit and education based, while others specifically aim to protect a certain group of individuals. The following are organizations with brief descriptions of their aims, targeted audiences, and affiliations.

According to the Office of the High Commissioner for Human Rights (OHCHR), each submission whether private or public, governmental or NGO is evaluated with regards to the following context: appropriateness, effectiveness, originality, ease of use, adaptability, sustainability, approach, and inclusiveness. Each characteristic of which is detailed in the article Human Rights Education in the School Systems of Europe, Central Asia, and North America: A Compendium of Good Practice.

African Centre on Democracy and Human Rights Studies

African Commission on Human and Peoples' Rights This commission is in charge of monitoring the protection of humans' rights and ensuring the protection and promotion of these rights. It also is charged with the responsibility of interpreting the African Charter on Human and Peoples' Rights. This commission is limited to the continent of Africa and the countries within it.

Amnesty International One of the largest human rights organizations, Amnesty International includes 2.2 million members from over 150 countries. The organization concerns research as well as action in order to prevent and end human rights abuses. They are also focused on seeking justice for the violations which have already been committed.

The Asian Human Rights Commission The goals of the AHRC are "to protect and promote human rights by monitoring, investigation, and advocating and taking solidarity actions". This commission is limited to the continent of Asia and the countries within it.

The Children's Defense Fund attempts to create policies and programs to ensure equality to all children. They work towards decreasing the child poverty rate as well as protecting children from abuse and neglect. The members of the CDF act as advocates for children to help ensure they are treated equally and have the right to care and education in the future.

Commissioner for Human Rights, Council of Europe The commission is an independent institution which promotes awareness of human rights in the forty-seven Council of Europe Member States. Since it has such a broad area of concern its purpose is more to encourage reform and it takes "wider initiates on the basis of reliable information regarding human rights violations" rather than acting on individual complaints.

European Union Ombudsman This organization exists to investigate grievances about the maladministration that occurs within the institutions and bodies of the European Union.

Facing History and Ourselves This US developed online module organization aims to provide information investigating "how societies attempt to rebuild, repair, and bring a sense of justice and security to their citizenry in the aftermath of conflict and genocide". As the topics about which this particular organization are concerned with are more mature and sensitive than others, this program is designed for students in middle, high school, and at the university level. The module has specifically designed its program based on four case studies: Germany, Rwanda, Northern Ireland, and South Africa. This resource has proven helpful in order to study how individuals, organizations, and governments have fostered "stability, security, reconciliation, coexistence and/or justice", all of which are explained in further detail on the organization's website, www.facinghistory.org.

United Nations Human Rights Council This council includes 47 states and is charged with the responsibility of promoting and protecting human rights on the international level. The council has a specific Advisory committee which assesses each situation as well as an outlined Complaint Procedure which must be followed in order for an individual or organization to bring a violation to the attention of the council.

Human Rights Watch Functioning as another global organization, the Human Rights Watch protects human rights by investigating claims, holding abusers accountable of their actions, and monitoring and challenging governments to make sure that they are using their power to end abusive practices efficiently and to the fullest.

John Humphrey Centre for Peace and Human Rights The John Humphrey Centre exists to promote the principles of the Universal Declaration of Peace and Human Rights through human rights education and learning. The organization develops curriculum, conducts training, works with children and youth, and fosters public discourse on matters of human rights.

National Association for the Advancement of Colored People (NAACP) "The mission of the NAACP is to ensure the political, educational, social, and economic quality of rights of all persons and to eliminate racial hatred and racial discrimination".

Inter-African Committee on Traditional Practices Affecting the Health of Women and Children

Namibian Legal Assistance Centre

People in Need People in Need developed a project called One World in Schools: Human Rights Documentary Films in which they provide teachers with films, over 260 of which are available, and other multimedia tools to assist in their education of human rights around the world. The purpose of the videos is to teach the students, specifically primary and secondary school aged students in the Czech Republic, the values of tolerance and respect by way of audio-visual stimulation.

Office of Democratic Institutions and Human Rights of the Organization for Security and Co-Operation in Europe (OSCE) The OSCE comprises 56 states from participating countries in Europe, Central Asia, and North America. The main focuses of the OSCE include the freedom of movement and religion. They specifically monitor torture prevention and human trafficking.

Office of the United Nations High Commissioner for Human Rights Unlike many other organizations this office is not limited to a specific geographic area, but instead works to protection all human rights for all peoples. This organization also states within its mission statement it aims to "help empower people to realize their rights" versus many organizations which state that they wish to promote knowledge etc.

Office of the United Nations High Commissioner for Refugees This organization has a specific target audience of refugees which it hopes to protect from violations of their rights. They aim to ensure that any person can seek a safe refuge in some place while remaining to have the option to return home, integrate at a new locale or resettle in a third location.

The Simon Wiesenthal Center is a human rights organization which focuses on the international Jewish community. The Center addresses anti-Semitism including the hate and terrorism associated with it. By teaming up with Israel and cooperating closely with the Jewish religious community, the Center defends the safety of Jews worldwide and serves to educate others about Jewish history including but limited to the Holocaust.

Tostan Tostan is an international non-profit organization headquartered in Dakar, Senegal, operating in six countries across West Africa. Tostan's mission is to empower African communities to bring about sustainable development and positive social transformation based on respect for human rights. At the core of Tostan's work is its 30-month Community Empowerment Program (CEP), which provides participatory human rights education in local languages to adults and adolescents who have not attended formal schools, primarily in remote regions.

United Nations Education, Scientific and Cultural Organization (UNESCO) "UNESCO's goal is to build peace in the minds of men". The organization hopes to act as a catalyst for "regional, national, and international action in human rights".

US State Department Bureau of Democracy, Human Rights and Labor Confined to the United States, the Department strives to take action against abuse of human rights. Although they are not particularly involved with the investigations, they are the enforcers and have partnered with many other organizations committed to protecting human rights.

== Uses in the 21st century ==
- As a strategy for development (Clarence Dias)
- As empowerment (Garth Meintjes)
- As a way of change for women's rights (Dorota Gierycz)
- As a legal prospective and for law enforcement (Edy Kaufman)

== See also ==
- Children's rights education
- Democratic education
- Humanitarian education
- Peace education
- Educational technology
- Education for justice
- Education for sustainable development
- Philosophy education
- Progressive education

== Sources ==
- Murphy, F.; Ruane, B. (2003). "Amnesty International and human rights education".
