= Terje Rypdal / Miroslav Vitous / Jack DeJohnette =

Studio album by Terje Rypdal
- Released: 1978
- Recorded: June 1978
- Studio: Talent Studio; Oslo, Norway
- Genre: Jazz
- Length: 42:12
- Label: ECM 1125
- Producer: Manfred Eicher

Terje Rypdal chronology
Waves (1977)	Terje Rypdal / Miroslav Vitous / Jack DeJohnette (1978)	Descendre (1980)

Terje Rypdal / Miroslav Vitous / Jack DeJohnette chronology
Terje Rypdal / Miroslav Vitous / Jack DeJohnette (1978)	To Be Continued (1981)

Jack DeJohnette chronology
New Directions (1978)	Terje Rypdal / Miroslav Vitous / Jack DeJohnette (1978)	Special Edition (1980)

Terje Rypdal / Miroslav Vitous / Jack DeJohnette is an album by Norwegian jazz guitarist Terje Rypdal recorded in June 1978 and released on ECM later that year. The trio features rhythm section Miroslav Vitous and Jack DeJohnette.

== Reception ==
The AllMusic review by Paul Collins awarded the album 4½ stars stating "An otherworldly soundscape of aching beauty, this album is a must-have for aficionados of any member of this trio."

Professional ratings
Review scores
Source	Rating
Allmusic	4.5/5 stars

== Track listing ==
All compositions by Terje Rypdal except as indicated

1. "Sunrise" - 8:30
2. "Den forste sne" - 6:39
3. "Will" (Miroslav Vitous) - 8:05
4. "Believer" (Vitous) - 6:27
5. "Flight" (Vitous, Rypdal, Jack DeJohnette) - 5:29
6. "Seasons" (Rypdal, Vitous, DeJohnette) - 7:22

== Personnel ==
- Terje Rypdal – guitar, guitar synthesizer, organ
- Miroslav Vitouš – double bass, electric piano
- Jack DeJohnette – drums
