= Chasing Dreams (disambiguation) =

Chasing Dreams is the debut album by English comedian, television presenter and actor Bradley Walsh.

Chasing Dreams may also refer to:

== Books ==
- Chasing Dreams, romantic novel by Susan Lewis
- Chasing Dreams: Kathmandu Odyssey, poetic play by Abhi Subedi
- Chasing Dreams, 2008 novel in the Chestnut Hill series created by Lauren Brooke

== Film ==
- Chasing Dreams (film), 1982 baseball film with early role by Kevin Kostner
- Chasing Dream (film), a 2019 Hongkong romcom film
- Meraih Mimpi (Indonesian: Chasing Dreams), the Indonesian adaptation of Gita Gutawa (Sing to the Dawn)

== Music ==
- Chasing Dreams, a band led by Bo Stief

=== Albums ===
- Chasing Dreams (Kelly Chen album) (微光), first Mandarin album by Kelly Chan, 2010
- Chasing Dreams, debut EP of Kalin and Myles, 2012
- Chasing Dreams EP, by Magnet, 2002

=== Songs ===
- "Chasing Dreams", song by Magnet from On Your Side
- "Chasing Dreams" (追梦), song by Baby Zhang
- "Chasing Dreams", song by Gina Kiss entered to represent Hungary in the Eurovision Song Contest 2012
- "Chasing Dreams", song by Coldrain from The Revelation
- "Chasing Dreams", D.O.D. with Sandro Silva 2014
- "Chasing Dreams", by Deadly Venoms

== See also ==
- Chasing the Dream (disambiguation)
- Chasing a Dream 2009 telefilm
- Dream Chasing, a 2011 autobiography by Shiva Balak Misra
- Dreamchasing, a charity founded by Ron Dennis
- Dream Chasers (disambiguation)
