= David Darling (musician) =

American cellist and composer (1941–2021)

- Born: March 4, 1941; Elkhart, Indiana, U.S.
- Died: January 8, 2021 (aged 79)
- Genres: Jazz; new-age
- Occupation: Musician
- Instrument: Cello
- Years active: 1980s–2021
- Labels: ECM; Universal Classics; Hearts of Space
- Formerly of: Gallery
- Website: daviddarling.com

David Darling (March 4, 1941 – January 8, 2021) was an American cellist and composer. In 2010, he won the Grammy Award for Best New Age Album. He performed and recorded with Bobby McFerrin, Paul Winter Consort, Ralph Towner and Spyro Gyra and released many solo albums. Among these were 15 recordings for ECM.

== Music career ==
Darling was born on March 4, 1941, in Elkhart, Indiana. He was interested in music from an early age, beginning piano when he was four, cello at ten, and string bass in high school. He studied classical cello at Indiana State University and after graduating remained there another four years as a teacher.

He worked as a studio musician in Nashville, Tennessee and was a member of the Paul Winter Consort until 1978. During the following year, he was part of the chamber jazz group Gallery with Ralph Towner and released his first solo album, Journal October.

Darling's performance and composition draw on a wide range of styles, including classical, jazz, Brazilian, African, and Indian music.

He wrote and performed music for more than a dozen major motion pictures, the horror film Child's Play (1988), Heat (1995), and Until the End of the World (1991). He contributed music to Nouvelle Vague (1990), Éloge de l'amour (2001), and Notre musique (2004).

In 2000, he recorded a collaboration with the Wulu Bunun, a group of Taiwanese aborigines.

In 2007 he recorded The Darling Conversations, with Julie Weber discussing his music philosophy. It was issued by Manifest Spirit Records. In January 2009, Darling released the Grammy-winning Prayer for Compassion, a follow-up of his earlier 8-String Religion, both on the Curve Blue label.

== Other activities ==
In 1986, Darling joined Young Audiences, an organization that seeks to educate children about music and the arts through school programs. In the same year, he founded Music for People, which seeks to encourage self-expression through musical improvisation. His teaching methods are the subject of a book, Return to Child (2008).

In May 2008, he became part of a collaboration of music teacher and performers offering a training program in holistic and intercultural approaches to healing with sound and music at the New York Open Center Sound and Music School. David Darling died in his sleep, January 8, 2021.

== Awards and honors ==
- Grammy Award, Best New Age Album, Prayer for Compassion, 2010

== Discography ==
=== As leader ===
- Journal October (ECM, 1979)
- Cycles (ECM, 1981)
- Cello (ECM, 1992)
- Dark Wood, (ECM, 1993)
- Eight String Religion, (Curve Blue,1993)
- The Tao of Cello (Relaxation, 1993)
- Musical Massage: Balance (Relaxation, 2000)
- Cello Blue, (Hearts of Space/Valley Entertainment, 2001)
- Musical Massage: In Tune (Relaxation, 2001)
- River Notes, (Curve Blue, 2002)
- Open Window (Relaxation, 2003)
- Mudanin (Kata World Music Network/Riverboat, 2004)
- Balance (Gaiam, 2006)
- Musical Massage: Blissful Relaxation (Relaxation, 2007)
- The Darling Conversations, Vol. 1 (Manifest Spirit, 2007)
- Prayer for Compassion (Curve Blue, 2009)
- Where Did the Time Go (CD Baby, 2013)
- Gratitude (Curve Blue, 2016)
- Homage to Kindness (2019)

=== As sideman ===
With Peter Kater

- Homage, 1989
- Migration, 1992

With Ketil Bjørnstad

- The Sea (ECM, 1994)
- The River (ECM, 1996)
- The Sea II (ECM, 2000)
- Epigraphs (ECM, 2000)

With Terje Rypdal

- Eos (ECM, 1984)
- Skywards (ECM, 1995)

With Jacqueline Tschabold Bhuyan

- Cello & Piano Meditations (Sounds True, 2012)
- Improvisations for Cello & Piano (CD Baby, 2012)

With others

- Introducing Glen Moore, Glen Moore (Elektra, 1979)
- Old Friends, New Friends, Ralph Towner (ECM, 1979)
- Amber, Michael Jones, 1987
- Until the End of the World 1991
- Window Steps, Pierre Favre, With Kenny Wheeler, and Steve Swallow (ECM, 1996)
- Pendulum, with Kevin Keller, 1999
- 96 Years, with Patrick Leonard, 2000
- Refuge, with Terry Tempest Williams, ( Curve Blue, 2002)
- Into the Deep: America, Whaling & the World, 2010)
- Return of DeSire: Improvisations, with Eve Kodiak (CD Baby, 2008)
- Tympanum, with Jane Buttars, 2013
- "Where Did The Time Go" with Neil Tatar 2013
- In Love and Longing, with Silvia Nakkach, (Sounds True, 2014)
- Ocean Dreaming Ocean, Posthumously with Hans Christian (Curve Blue, 2023)

== See also ==
- List of ambient music artists
