= Palle Mikkelborg =

Danish jazz trumpet player

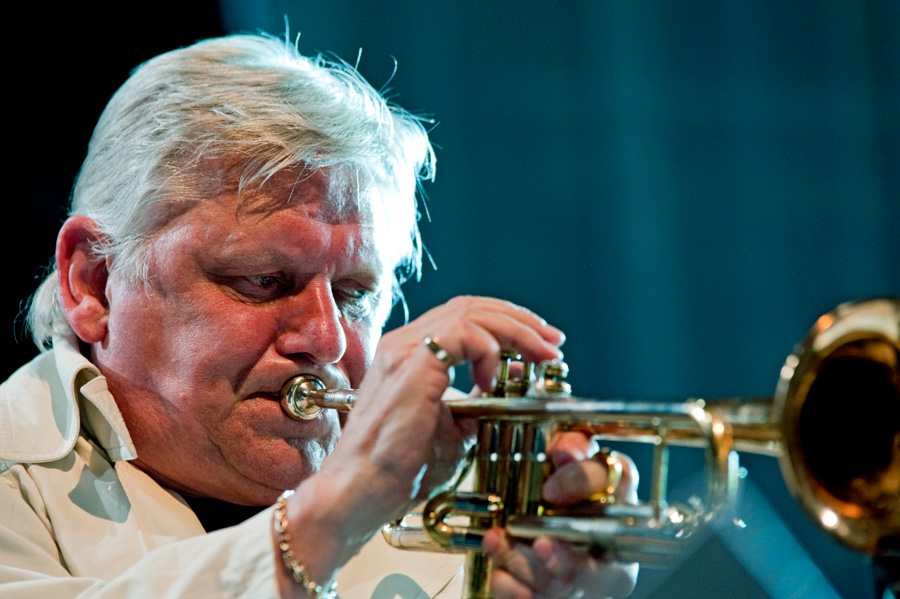
- Mikkelborg, performing at the Moers Festival, 2010

Background information
- Born: 6 March 1941 (age 85); Copenhagen, Denmark
- Genres: Jazz, jazz fusion
- Occupations: Musician, composer, arranger, record producer
- Instruments: Trumpet and flugelhorn
- Years active: 1960–present
- Label: ECM

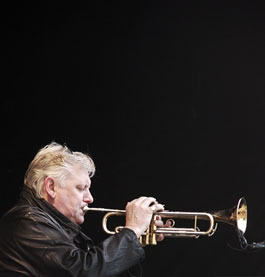
Palle Mikkelborg: Playing in Aarhus, Denmark.

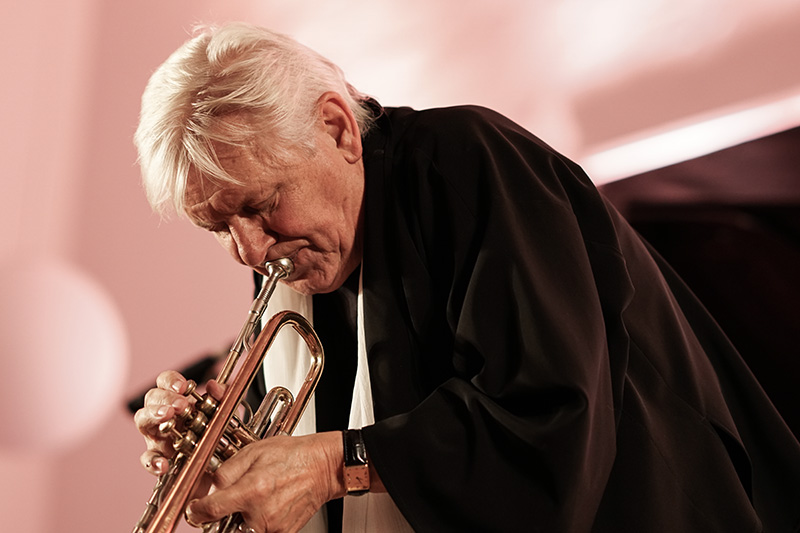
Palle Mikkelborg 2017.

Palle Mikkelborg (born 6 March 1941) is a Danish jazz trumpet player, composer, arranger and record producer.

He is self-taught on the trumpet, although he studied conducting at the Royal Music Conservatory in Copenhagen. He became a professional musician in 1960 and joined the Danish Radiojazzgruppen three years later. Mikkelborg became their leader in 1967 and retained that position until 1972. In addition, he was a member of the Radioens Big Band over a similar time frame. He played trumpet in both, but also wrote, arranged, and conducted both. Forming a jazz quintet with drummer, Alex Riel they performed at the Montreux Jazz Festival and Newport Jazz Festival (1968). He later led an octet, V8, in the 1970s, and another outfit, Entrance, from the mid-1970s until 1985. His compositions were made for various ensembles, including extended pieces for larger outfits.

In 1984, he composed Aura, a tribute to Miles Davis.

== Discography ==
As Leader

- The Mysterious Corona (Debut, 1967)
- Anything but Grey (Columbia, 1992)
- Futopia (Columbia, 1993)
- Song .... Tread Lightly (Columbia, 2000)
- Voice of Silence: Homage to the Louisiana Museum of Modern Art (Stunt, 2013)
- Strands Live with Jakob Bro and Marilyn Mazur (ECM, 2023)

With Danish Radio Big Band

- Brownsville Trolley Line (Sonet, 1970) as conductor – recorded in 1969

With Miles Davis

- Aura (Columbia, 1989)

With Bill Evans

- Treasures: Solo, Trio & Orchestra Recordings from Denmark (1965-69) (Elemental Music, 2023)

With Dexter Gordon

- More Than You Know (SteepleChase, 1975)
- The Other Side of Round Midnight (Blue Note, 1986)

With Philip Catherine

- September Man (Atlantic, 1974)

With George Gruntz

- Theatre (ECM, 1983)

With Gary Peacock

- Guamba (ECM, 1987)

With Terje Rypdal

- Waves (ECM, 1978)
- Descendre (ECM, 1979)
- Skywards (ECM, 1995)
- Lux Aeterna (ECM, 2000)
- Vossabrygg (ECM, 2003)

With Dino Saluzzi

- Once Upon a Time - Far Away in the South (ECM, 1985)

With Edward Vesala

- Satu (ECM, 1977)

With Thomas Clausen

- Even Closer (ARTS, 2011)

With Jakob Bro

- Returnings (ECM, 2018)

With L. Shankar

- Vision (ECM, 1984)
