= Vossabrygg =

Live album by Terje Rypdal
- Released: 03 February 2006
- Recorded: 12 April 2003
- Venues: Vossajazz, Norway
- Genre: Jazz
- Length: 68:05
- Labels: ECM; ECM 1984
- Producer: Manfred Eicher (ex.)

Terje Rypdal chronology
Lux Aeterna (2000)	Vossabrygg (2006)	Crime Scene (2008)

Vossabrygg is a live album by Norwegian jazz guitarist Terje Rypdal, recorded at Vossajazz in 2003 and released on ECM in 2006. Vossabrygg - translated to English as "Vossa brew" - was commissioned for Norway's 2003 Vossajazz festival and was conceived by Rypdal as a tribute to Miles Davis's classic album, Bitches Brew.

== Reception ==
The critical reception of Vossabrygg noted its ambitious scope, describing it as "a stunning, unraveling labyrinth, created by a master explorer." Writing for AllAboutJazz, John Kelman observed Rypdal's strong musical lineage to Miles Davis, from Rypdal's line-up and instrumentation choices on Vossabrygg, as well as its similarities to other progressive recordings in Davis's discography, notably In a Silent Way Despite the obvious musical influences, Rypdal's ability to deliver originality was a sentiment expressed in several reviews, with the performances from both Rypdal and trumpeter, Palle Mikkelborg, attracting praise. "The clear antecedents of Vossabrygg in the music of Miles don't obscure the fact that this is unequivocally a Rypdal record, transcending mere imitation and applying a distinctive filter."

Though the critical reception of Vossabrygg was generally positive, the inclusion of drum loops and sample interludes by Rypdal's son were frequently cited as detracting from the overall musical experience. Their inclusion was described as "tedious" and "a curate's egg" in a BBC Music review and "instantly dated" by PopMatters.

Professional ratings
Review scores
Source	Rating
AllAboutJazz	5/5 stars
AllMusic	4/5 stars
The Guardian	4/5 stars

== Track listing ==
All compositions by Terje Rypdal (uncredited)

1. Ghostdancing (18:31)
2. Hidden Chapter (5:39 )
3. Waltz for Broken Hearts/Makes You Wonder (10:06)
4. Incognito Traveller (4:04 )
5. Key Witness (1:36)
6. That's More Like It (10:07)
7. De Slagferdige (2:38)
8. Jungeltelegrafen (2:39)
9. You're Making It Personal (8:54)
10. A Quiet Word (3:46)

== Personnel ==
=== Musicians ===
- Terje Rypdal – electric guitar
- Palle Mikkelborg – trumpet, synthesizer
- Bugge Wesseltoft – electric piano, synthesizer
- Ståle Storløkken – Hammond organ, electric piano, synthesizer
- Marius Rypdal – electronics, samples, turntables
- Bjørn Kjellemyr – electric and acoustic bass
- Jon Christensen – drums
- Paolo Vinaccia – percussion

=== Technical personnel ===
- Per Ravnaas – engineer
- Manfred Eicher – executive producer
- Jan Erik Kongshaug, Terje Rypdal – editing, mixing
- Sascha Kleis – cover design
- Vidar Langeland – liner photography
