= Atle Bakken =

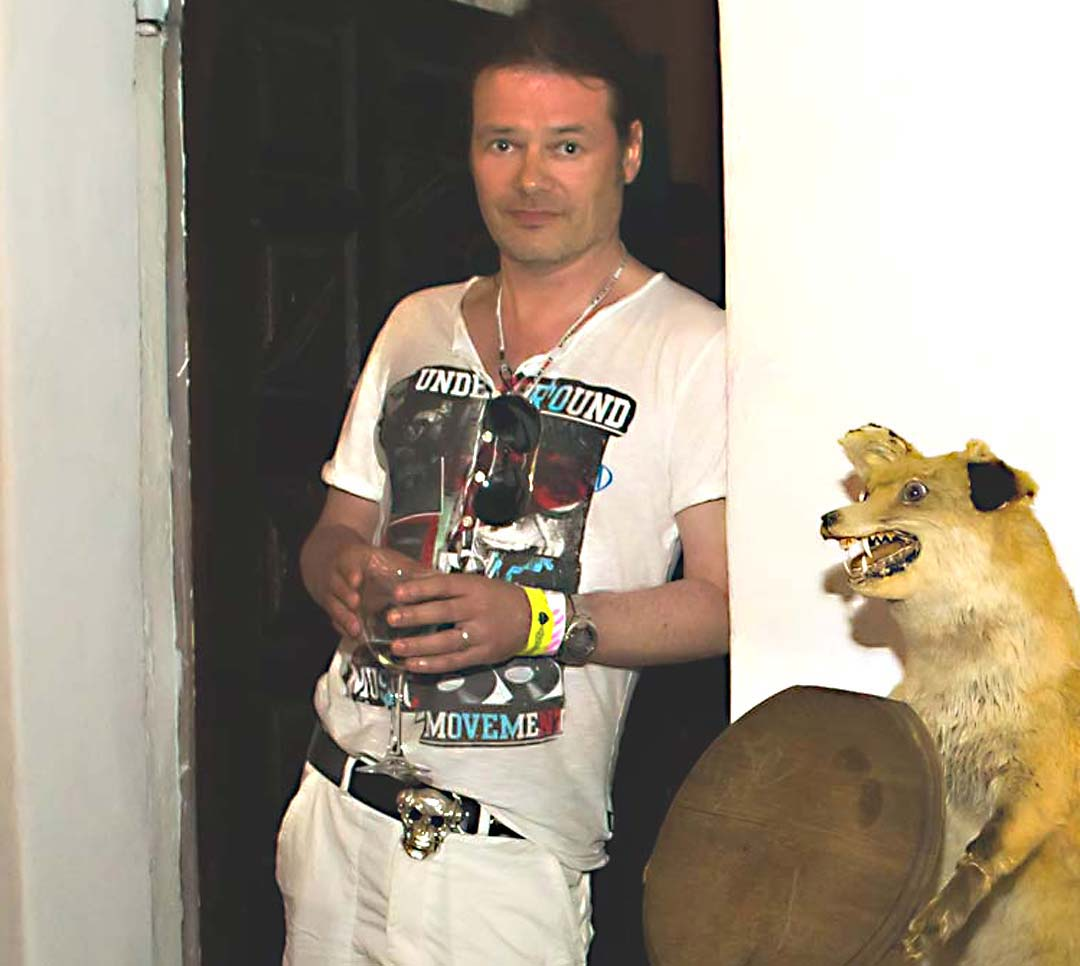
- Atle Bakken at Pikes ibiza, photo by Nelly Loriaux

Background information
- Born: Atle Bakken; Sandefjord, Vestfold, Norway
- Genres: Rock, pop, jazz, reggae
- Occupations: Composer, Musician, record producer, journalist
- Instruments: Organ, synthesizer, keyboards, piano
- Years active: 1982-present
- Website: atlebakken.com

Atle Bakken (born 1962 in Sandefjord, Norway), is a composer, performer and producer from Norway, known on both sides of the Atlantic, through his work with Stevie Wonder, Sting, Diana Ross, Andy Summers, Snoop Dogg, Andraé Crouch and scoring credits such as the Fox/HBO award-winning TV comedy series Martin, starring Martin Lawrence.

Bakken has since 1986 been a journalist for music magazines such as Keyboard magazine (US), Ballade (NO), Sonic Shocks (UK) and Musikkpraksis (NO).

== Life and career ==
Atle Bakken started his music involvement at 5 years of age by copying Glenn Miller's “Moonlight Serenade” on a Hohner melodica. He took up classical studies at 10 with Dr. Norbert Bojanowski, going through the repertoire of Grieg, Bach, Mozart and Liszt, and the likes. At 14 Bakken started his own organ jazz trio and started to perform concerts in the spirit of Larry Young and Jimmy Smith, and recorded his first radio show (at NRK). He also started performing R&B and soul with a band a la Tower of Power. At age 15, Bakken was discovered by Sony Music A&R, Kristian Lindeman by having recorded his own material for local talent scout & manager, Fredrik Friis.

Bakken was noted nationally in Norway at age 19, at the annual Jazz Symposium in Søgne, Norway in 1980. Jazz notables such as Radka Toneff, Arild Andersen and Jon Eberson heard his talent among other students such as Sidsel Endresen and Eivind Aarset. Eberson invited Atle to join his newly founded band, Jon Eberson Group, which through Kristian Lindeman went to break all records in terms of sales for a “jazz” group in Norway, and in general, selling more than 250,000 albums. Atle consequently joined Sony Music as a producer and arranger for their Norwegian roster.

From the beginning, Atle always made it a priority of utilizing electronic instruments and computers in a “human way” in his music. In the mid-seventies, Atle was the first artist in Norway to use the Oberheim Four Voice polyphonic synthesizer. Later, in the mid-80s, he was the first artist in Scandinavia to record with the Synclavier Digital Music System. (Benny Andersson of ABBA was a close second.)

Atle joined ECM Records and the group Terje Rypdal & The Chasers, recording and traveling all over Europe, playing symphonic music and jazz. At the same time Atle would produce music for Schlager Records in Oslo with various artists, as well as composing music for dancetheatre, video and multimedia projects.

He would also assist Terje Rypdal in his classical scorings and orchestrations for the concert stage and theatre. In 1991 Atle was invited to the US. by gospel legend Andraé Crouch to help him produce his album. He went on to work on multiple CDs and projects for Andrae Crouch, Helen Baylor, Phil Driscoll and others, winning a Grammy for Andraé Crouch's album and getting nominated for Baylor's. His longstanding collaboration with Crouch also resulted in the Gospel legends studio album Pray, which went to the top on the Billboard charts.

Atle went on to tour worldwide with Andy Summers for two years and teamed up with Sting, playing at the Montreux Jazz Festival. Stevie Wonder requested Atle for work on Jungle Fever and Diana Ross's The Force Behind the Power.

At the same time, Atle attended the prestigious Dick Grove School of music in Los Angeles, studying harmony and orchestration with Dr. Dick Grove and movie composer Thom Sharp.

In the mid-1990s, Atle was involved with projects for Sony Music's European division and Stateside, Atle composed for three seasons on the now syndicated TV series Martin. Through his association with TV- and filmwork in Hollywood, Atle also polished his skills, working with the orchestras at various scoring sessions.

Atle then formed ALEX MUSIC, and started finding new artists for recording. One of the projects, produced in association with EMI/Toshiba, was released in Japan and sold over 1 million units. Atle & Alex was recently been charted on the top of the Billboard and the European lists by producing LEANA, a Swedish artist.

In 2006 Atle was requested to start the online music company Castle Entertainment. The project, with bases in Zurich, Switzerland and Ibiza, Spain has industry endorsers such as Ramon Hervey III and Andy Summers.

Atle is annually and recently named in Who Is Who In Hollywood in the Hollywood Reporters Film & TV issue, mentioning the top composers in the world.

Currently, of Atle is concentrating on a new personal music album and project, Future Sound of Østerdalen with his deceased great-grandfather, Ingulf Bakken, a recording which also features Wyclef Jean, Andy Summers and others.

He is also involved with projects for Castle Entertainment in the US and Europe, Sony Music and EMI Music Japan (Asia).
