= Humanistic education =

Education based on humanistic psychology

Humanistic education (also called person-centered education) is an approach to education based on the work of humanistic psychologists, most notably Abraham Maslow and Carl Rogers. Rogers is regarded as the founder of humanistic psychology and devoted much of his efforts toward applying the results of his psychological research to person-centered teaching where empathy, caring about students, and genuineness on the part of the learning facilitator were found to be the key traits of the most effective teachers. He edited a series of books dealing with humanistic education in his "Studies of the Person Series," which included his book, Freedom to Learn and Learning to Feel – Feeling to Learn – Humanistic Education for the Whole Man, by Harold C. Lyon, Jr. In the 1970s the term humanistic education became less popular after conservative groups equated it with secular humanism and attacked the writings of Harold Lyon as being anti-Christian. That began a successful effort by Aspy, Lyon, Rogers, and others to re-label it "person-centered teaching", replacing the term humanistic education. In a more general sense, the term includes the work of other humanistic pedagogues, such as Rudolf Steiner, and Maria Montessori, whose method emphasised individual initiative and self-directed learning. All of these approaches seek to engage the "whole person":

== History ==
Humanistic education has its roots in Renaissance philosophers who emphasised the study of the humanities: grammar, rhetoric, history, poetry, and moral philosophy; these in turn built upon Classical models of education.

== Principles ==
=== Choice and control ===
The humanistic approach places a great deal of emphasis on students' choice and control over the course of their education. Students are encouraged to make choices ranging from day-to-day activities to setting future life goals. This allows students to focus on a specific subject of interest for as long as they choose, within reason. Humanistic teachers believe students must be motivated and engaged in the material they are learning, and this happens when the topic is something students need and want to know.

=== Felt concerns ===
Humanistic education tends to focus on students' felt concerns and interests, intertwining them with the intellect. It is believed that students' overall mood and feelings can either hinder or foster the learning process.

=== The whole person ===
Humanistic educators believe that both feelings and knowledge matter in the learning process. Unlike traditional educators, humanistic teachers do not separate the cognitive and affective domains. This aspect also relates to the curriculum in the sense that lessons and activities provide focus on various aspects of the student and not just rote memorization through note-taking and lecturing.

=== Self-evaluation ===
Humanistic educators believe that grades are irrelevant and that only self-evaluation is meaningful. Grading encourages students to work for a grade and not for intrinsic satisfaction. Humanistic educators disagree with routine testing because they believe it teaches students rote memorization as opposed to meaningful learning. They also believe testing does not provide teachers with sufficient educational feedback.

=== Teacher as a facilitator ===
"The tutor or lecturer tends to be more supportive than critical, more understanding than judgmental, more genuine than playing a role." Their job is to foster an engaging environment for the students and ask inquiry-based questions that promote meaningful learning.

=== Field studies on humanistic education ===
David Aspy and Flora Roebuck performed a large field study, in 42 states and 7 countries, in the 1970s and 1980s, funded by the National Institute of Mental Health over a 12-year period, focusing on what led to achievement, creativity, more student thinking and interactivity, less violence, and both teacher and student satisfaction. Their conclusions corroborated earlier findings by Carl Rogers that the most effective teachers were empathic, cared for or valued their students, and were authentic and genuine in their classroom presence. In 2010, Jeffrey Cornelius-White and Adam Harbaugh published a large meta-analysis on learner-centred instruction, including in their analysis the higher-quality studies on person-centred or humanistic education since 1948. In 2013, Rogers, Lyon, and Tausch published On Becoming an Effective Teacher -- Person-centered Teaching, Psychology, Philosophy, and Dialogues with Carl R. Rogers and Harold Lyon, which contained Rogers' unpublished work on teaching and documented the research results of four highly related, independent studies which comprise a collection of data to test a person-centered theory in the field of education.

=== In environment ===
The environment in a school that focuses on humanistic education tends to be very different from that of a traditional school. It includes both indoor and outdoor spaces, with most time spent outdoors. The indoor setting may include a few tables and chairs, bean bags for quiet reading and relaxation, bookshelves, hideaways, kitchens, lots of colour, and art posted on the walls. The outdoor environment is very engaging for students. Tree houses, outdoor kitchens, sand boxes, play sets, natural materials, or sporting activities may be available. A wide range of activities is offered, allowing students to choose based on their interests.

== Related movements ==
A number of contemporary school movements incorporate humanistic perspectives within a larger, holistic context: these include the Waldorf, Montessori, Reggio Emilia, and Neohumanist schools. These originated independently of the humanistic psychology movement and at least some of them incorporate spiritual perspectives absent from the traditional humanistic approach.

== See also ==
- Democratic school
- Forest kindergarten
- Forest school (learning style)
- Humane education
- Humanistic psychology
- Humanitarian education
- Learning theory
- Liberal education
- Music for People
- Progressive education
- Sudbury school
- Waldorf education
