= Cycles (David Darling album) =

Studio album by David Darling
- Released: 1982
- Recorded: November 1981
- Studio: Talent Studio; Oslo, Norway
- Genre: Jazz
- Length: 46:24
- Label: ECM; ECM 1219
- Producer: Manfred Eicher

David Darling chronology
Journal October (1979)	Cycles (1982)	Eos (1984)

Cycles is the second album by cellist David Darling, recorded in 1981 and released on ECM the following year.

== Reception ==
The AllMusic review by Scott Yanow awarded the album 4 stars stating "Darling and his sidemen give the music a wide variety of sounds. However, the sleepy mood is very much in the stereotypical ECM mold, making this set mostly of interest for selected tastes."

Professional ratings
Review scores
Source	Rating
AllMusic	4/5 stars

== Track listing ==
All tracks are written by David Darling, except as noted.

Side I
No.	Title	Writer(s)	Length
1.	"Cycle Song"		7:09
2.	"Cycle One: Namaste"	Darling; Jan Garbarek; Collin Walcott	4:11
3.	"Fly"		9:25

Side II
No.	Title	Writer(s)	Length
1.	"Ode"		6:55
2.	"Cycle Two: Trio"	Darling; Steve Kuhn; Walcott	5:30
3.	"Cycle Three: Quintet and Coda"	Arild Andersen; Oscar Castro-Neves; Darling; Kuhn; Walcott	7:52
4.	"Jessica's Sunwheel"	Castro-Neves; Darling	5:21

== Personnel ==
- David Darling – cello, 8-string electric cello
- Collin Walcott – sitar (1,4,7), tabla (2,5,6), percussion (2)
- Steve Kuhn – piano (except track 2 & 4)
- Jan Garbarek – tenor saxophone (3,4,7), soprano saxophone (2)
- Arild Andersen – bass (except tracks 2 & 5)
- Oscar Castro-Neves – guitar (except tracks 1, 3 & 5)
