= Eos (Terje Rypdal & David Darling album) =

Studio album by Terje Rypdal & David Darling
- Released: 30 January 1984
- Recorded: May 1983
- Studio: Talent Studio; Oslo, Norway
- Genre: Jazz
- Length: 45:55
- Label: ECM 1263
- Producer: Manfred Eicher

Terje Rypdal chronology
To Be Continued (1981)	Eos (1984)	Chaser (1985)

David Darling chronology
Cycles (1981)	Eos (1983)	Amber (1987)

Eos is an album by Norwegian jazz guitarist Terje Rypdal and American cellist David Darling recorded in May 1983 and released on ECM the following year.

== Reception ==
The AllMusic review by Michael P. Dawson awarded the album 2½ stars stating "Probably Rypdal's most experimental release, it's a set of heavily electronic duets with cellist David Darling."

Professional ratings
Review scores
Source	Rating
AllMusic	4/5 stars
The Rolling Stone Jazz Record Guide	3/5 stars

== Track listing ==
All compositions by Terje Rypdal except as indicated

1. "Laser" - 4:08
2. "Eos" - 14:35
3. "Bedtime Story" - 5:58
4. "Light Years" (David Darling) - 4:48
5. "Melody" - 2:17
6. "Mirage" - 9:13
7. "Adagietto" - 5:06

== Personnel ==
- Terje Rypdal – electric guitar, keyboards (specified on liner notes as Casio MT-30)
- David Darling – cello, 8 string electric cello
