= Audun Kleive =

Norwegian jazz drummer (born 1961)

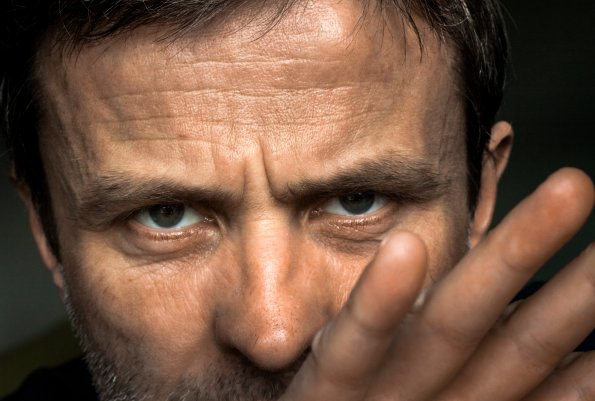

Background information
- Born: 20 October 1961 (age 64); Skien, Telemark, Norway
- Genres: Jazz
- Occupation: Musician
- Instrument: Drums
- Years active: 1982–present
- Website: audunkleive.com

Audun Kleive (born 20 October 1961) is a Norwegian jazz drummer. He was raised in Skien and is the son of organist Kristoffer Kleive and brother of organist Iver Kleive.

== Career ==
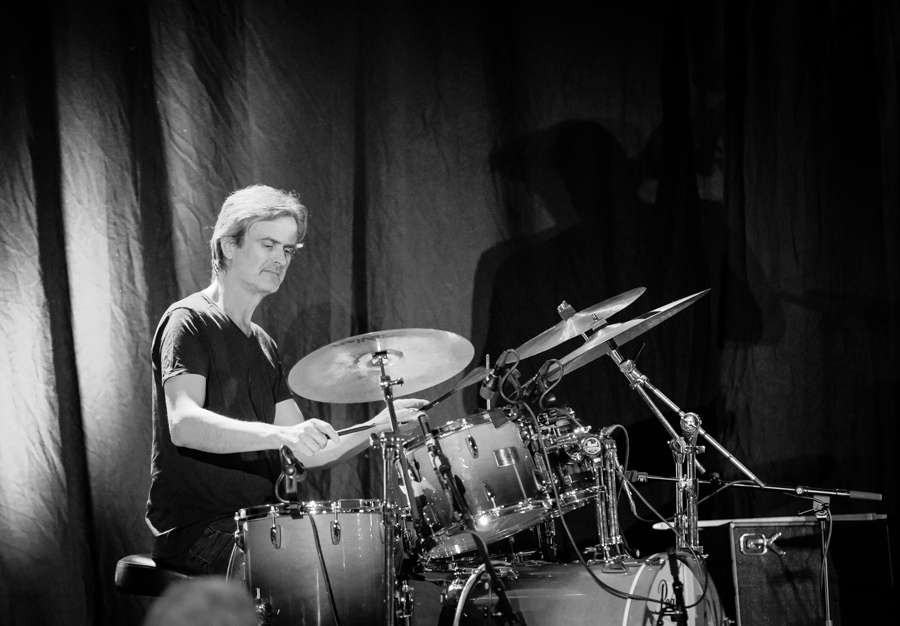
Kleive in 2017

Kleive began to play drums in a rock and dance band, and then went to Oslo, where he studied at the Norwegian Academy of Music. He joined the jazz-rock groups Lotus (1981–83) and Oslo 13 (1981–84), and made his recording debut with the album Anti-therapy in 1983. Described as one of the "leading lights in the Oslo Nu-jazz scene", he made his distinctive contribution to groups like Terje Rypdal's Chasers, Per Jørgensen's JøKleBa and Jon Balke's Magnetic North Orchestra as well as Marilyn Mazur & Future Song.

Kleive has released the albums, Bitt (1996–97), Generator X (2000) and Ohmagoddabl (2004) on Bugge Wesseltoft's label, Jazzland. In 2010 he gave a concert as a duet with the jazz tenorist Petter Wettre. The concert was recorded and released on the album The Only Way to Travel 2 (2011), as a follow-up of the 2000 volume 1 album. In 2013 he was engaged for a set on the Music Festival 'Punktfestivalen' in Kristiansand, where he also collaborated on recordings for the album Crime scenes (2006) with Jan Bang and Erik Honoré among others.

== Awards and honors ==
- 1999: Kongsberg Jazz Award

== Discography ==
=== As leader ===
- Music for Men and Machines (Curling Legs, 1993)
- Audun Kleive Generator X (Jazzland/EmArcy, 2000)
- Ohmagoddabl (Jazzland, 2004)
- Attack (POLselection, 2012)
- Release (POLselection, 2012)

With 1300 Oslo

- Anti-Therapy (Odin, 1983)
- Off Balance (Odin, 1988)
- Live (Curling Legs, 1993)
- Live in the North (Curling Legs, 2001)

With Entra

- Live Lights (Timeless, 1989)
- Ballet (LJ, 1992)
- In Concert (LJ, 1998)

With Jokleba

- Jokleba! (Norsk 1993)
- Live! (Curling Legs, 1996)
- Jokleba! & Nu Jok? (EmArcy/Universal 2011)
- Outland (ECM, 2014)

With Scheen Jazzorkester

- God Tro, Feil Frakk (Grong Music, 2013)
- Magne Rutle Blane (Grong Music, 2015)
- PoliturPassiarer (Losen, 2017)
- Tamanoar (Losen, 2017)
- Commuter Report (Losen, 2018)

=== As sideman ===
With Jon Balke

- On and On (Odin, 1991)
- Nonsentration (ECM, 1992)
- Further (ECM, 1994)
- Kyanos (ECM, 2002)

With Kari Bremnes

- Tid a Hausta Inn (Pa Norsk, 1983)
- Mitt Ville Hjerte (Kirkelig Kulturverksted, 1987)
- Bla Krukke (Kirkelig Kulturverksted, 1989)
- Losrivelse (Kirkelig Kulturverksted, 1993)

With Arve Henriksen

- Chiaroscuro (Rune Grammofon, 2004)
- Cartography (ECM, 2008)
- The Nature of Connections (Rune Grammofon, 2014)
- Composograph (Arve Music 2018)

With Jan Gunnar Hoff

- Syklus (Odin, 1993)
- Moving (Curling Legs, 1995)
- Crosslands (Curling Legs, 1998)
- In Town (Curling Legs, 2003)
- Magma (Grappa, 2008)
- Jan Gunnar Hoff Group Featuring Mike Stern (Losen, 2018)
- Polarity (2L, 2018)

With Marilyn Mazur

- Marilyn Mazur's Future Song (veraBra, 1992)
- Small Labyrinths (ECM, 1997)
- All the Birds Reflecting + Adventurous (Stunt, 2002)
- Daylight Stories (Stunt, 2004)

With Terje Rypdal

- Chaser (ECM, 1985)
- Blue (ECM, 1987)
- The Singles Collection (ECM, 1989)
- Rypdal & Tekro (RCA, 1994)
- If Mountains Could Sing (ECM, 1995)
- Rypdal & Tekro II (Grappa, 1997)
- The Radiosong (Beatheaven, 2002)

With others

- Eivind Aarset, Dream Logic (ECM, 2012)
- Ab und Zu, Spark of Life (Curling Legs, 2002)
- Arild Andersen, If You Look Far Enough (ECM, 1993)
- Stefano Bollani, Napoli Trip (Decca, 2016)
- Armen Donelian, Trio '87 (Odin, 1988)
- Pierre Dorge, The Jazzpar Prize (Enja, 1992)
- Jon Eberson, Stash (Odin, 1986)
- Jon Eberson, Pigs and Poetry (CBS, 1987)
- Mathias Eick, The Door (ECM, 2008)
- Jan Eggum, Dacapo (Sigma Music 1990)
- Jan Eggum, President (Grappa, 2002)
- Sidsel Endresen, Undertow (Jazzland/EmArcy, 2000)
- Extended Noise, Slow But Sudden Langsam, Aber Plotzlich (Odin, 1990)
- Anne-Marie Giortz, Breaking Out (Hot Club, 1983)
- Sigmund Groven & Arve Tellefsen, Musikken Inni Oss (Polydor, 1981)
- Thomas Gustafsson, T.G. Evil Orchestra (Dragon, 1999)
- Bendik Hofseth, Colours (Sonet/Verve 1997)
- Per Husby, Notes for Nature (Odin, 1990)
- Anders Jormin, Eight Pieces (Dragon, 1988)
- Rune Klakegg & Scheen Jazzorkester, Fjon (Losen, 2016)
- Olga Konkova & Carl Morten Iversen & Audun Kleive, Going with the Flow (Curling Legs, 1997)
- Fredrik Lundin, People, Places, Times and Faces (Storyville, 1993)
- Magnetic North Orchestra, Solarized (Emarcy, 1999)
- Rita Marcotulli, Koine (Storie Di Note 2002)
- Hans Mathisen, Moving Forward (Curling Legs, 2019)
- Nils Petter Molvaer, Hamada Sula, (EmArcy, 2009)
- Silje Nergaard, One of These Mornings & My Funny Valentine (Philips, 1984)
- Lina Nyberg, Brasilien (Prophone, 2001)
- Steinar Ofsdal, Vestenfor Mane (Slager, 1989)
- Punkt, Crime Scenes (Punkt 2006)
- Live Maria Roggen, Apokaluptein (Kirkelig Kulturverksted, 2016)
- David Sylvian, Sleepwalkers (Samadhisound, 2010)
- Hans Ulrik, Slow Procession (Stunt, 2009)
- Bugge Wesseltoft, New Conception of Jazz (Jazzland, 1997)

== Sources ==
- Deutsche Nationalbibliothek, Kleive, Audun (in German, accessed 12 April 2010)
- Mathieson, Kenny, "Dented instrument is no bar to lively performance from saxophone maestro", The Scotsman, 1 July 2008 (accessed 12 April 2010)
- Nicholson, Stuart, "The Oslo Underground and European Nu-Jazz", JazzTimes, Vol. 31, No. 4, May 2001, p. 69 (accessed 12 April 2010)
- Nicholson, Stuart, "Europeans Cut In With a New Jazz Sound And Beat", The New York Times, 3 June 2001 (accessed 12 April 2010)

Awards
| Preceded by Sidsel Endresen | Recipient of the Kongsberg Jazz Award; 1999 | Succeeded by Petter Wettre |
