= Røyken Church =

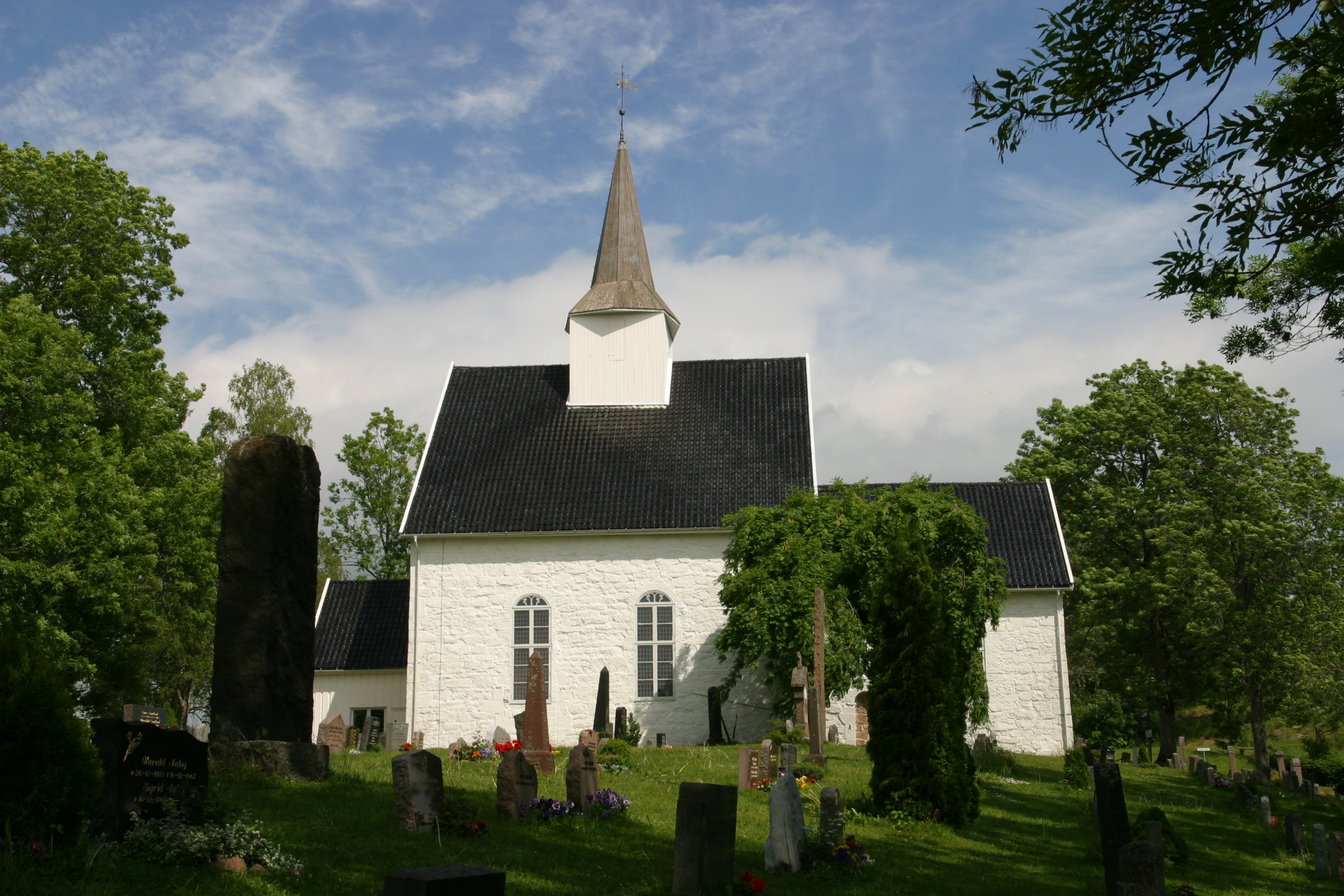
- Røyken Church

- Location of the church Røyken Church (Norway)
- 59.746°N 10.3867°E
- Location: Asker
- Country: Akershus

Architecture
- Style: Romanesque
- Completed: 1229

Røyken Church (Norwegian: Røyken kirke) is a church in the Asker municipality in Akershus county, Norway. Røyken Church serves Røyken parish in the Lier rural deanery of the Church of Norway.

== History ==
Røyken Church is a medieval nave stone church constructed of local red granite. It is believed to date from the 1220s. The first written record of the church appeared in Eysteinn Erlendsson's Røde Bok in 1392. The church displays the same strict simplicity that characterizes many churches from the same time.

The church has a rectangular nave with stone walls that are around 2 meters thick. Major repair of the church was made during 1859. The interior, which has been painted several times, was restored in the 1930s. An extensive restoration of the church was conducted between 1936 and 1939.

The church has a medieval baptismal font made from soapstone. The altarpiece dates from the 17th century.
