= Cello (album) =

Studio album by David Darling
- Released: 1992
- Recorded: November 1991; January 1992
- Studio: Rainbow Studio; Oslo, Norway
- Genre: Jazz
- Length: 44:09
- Label: ECM; ECM 1464
- Producer: Manfred Eicher

David Darling chronology
Homage (1989)	Cello (1992)	Migration (1992)

Cello is a solo album by cellist David Darling recorded over two sessions in November 1991 and January 1992 and released on ECM later that year.

== Reception ==
The AllMusic review by Ron Wynn awarded the album 3 stars stating "Superior cello playing by David Darling, a brilliant stylist who's not strictly, or even mainly, a jazz player. But he's an improviser, and his bowed and plucked solos are often astonishing in their clarity, depth, speed, and construction. He's also benefited by ECM's always-excellent production and mastering."

Professional ratings
Review scores
Source	Rating
AllMusic	3/5 stars

== Track listing ==
All compositions by David Darling except as indicated

1. "Darkwood I" - 2:21
2. "No Place Nowhere" (David Darling, Manfred Eicher) - 4:39
3. "Fables" - 5:04
4. "Darkwood II" - 1:19
5. "Lament" - 2:50
6. "Two or Three Things" (for Jean-Luc Godard) (Darling, Eicher) - 4:43
7. "Indiana Indian" - 3:24
8. "Totem" - 2:13
9. "Psalm" - 2:23
10. "Choral" - 4:05
11. "The Bell" - 2:39
12. "In November" - 4:28
13. "Darkwood III" - 3:19

== Personnel ==
- David Darling – cello, 8-string electric cello
