= Journal October =

Studio album by David Darling
- Released: 1980
- Recorded: October 1979
- Studio: Tonstudio Bauer; Ludwigsburg, West Germany
- Genre: Jazz
- Length: 52:45
- Label: ECM 1161
- Producer: Manfred Eicher

David Darling chronology
Journal October (1980)	Cycles (1981)

Journal October is the debut album by cellist David Darling, recorded in October 1979 and released on the ECM label.

== Reception ==
The AllMusic review by Ron Wynn awarded the album 4 stars stating "Although not strictly a jazz album, David Darling's 1979 solo release, Journal October, deserves attention. His technique is amazing, even if a lot of times he's more interested in colors and textures than in rhythms. He's certainly influenced by contemporary classical music, and at times things get so introspective he almost seems detached. But it's worth investigating, for Darling is capable of exciting statements."

Professional ratings
Review scores
Source	Rating
Allmusic	4/5 stars

== Track listing ==
All music by David Darling

1. "Slow Return" - 12:55
2. "Bells and Gongs" - 1:29
3. "Far Away Lights" - 3:41
4. "Solo Cello" - 5:46
5. "Minor Blue" - 3:23
6. "Clouds" - 6:17
7. "Solo Cello" - 6:26
8. "Solo Cello and Voice" - 2:59
9. "Journal October, Stuttgart" - 10:21

== Personnel ==
- David Darling – cello, bells, gong, timpani, voice
