= Steve Pryor =

American musician (1955 - 2016)

- Born: December 27, 1955; Tulsa, Oklahoma, US
- Died: May 6, 2016 (aged 60)
- Occupation: Musician

Steve Pryor (/ˈpraɪər/; December 27, 1955 – May 6, 2016) was an American musician. He is in the Oklahoma Blues Hall of Fame.

== Biography ==
Pryor started his first band in high school, Light Year, with Jimmy Strader on bass, Damon Daniel on drums and Mark Carpenter on guitar. In 1989, Pryor was offered a record deal and moved to Los Angeles. He had some years of success, touring with the Fabulous Thunderbirds and opening for Joe Cocker, he was also a member of The Old Dog Band.
