= Q.E.D. (Terje Rypdal album) =

Studio album by Terje Rypdal
- Released: 1993
- Recorded: August and December 1991
- Genre: Contemporary classical music
- Length: 52:11
- Label: ECM; ECM 1474
- Producer: Manfred Eicher

Terje Rypdal chronology
Undisonus (1990)	Q.E.D. (1993)	If Mountains Could Sing (1994)

Q.E.D. is a contemporary classical album by Norwegian jazz guitarist and composer Terje Rypdal recorded over two sessions in August and December 1991 and released on ECM in 1993. Rypdal is backed by the Borealis Ensemble conducted by Christian Eggen.

== Reception ==
The AllMusic review by Paul Collins awarded the album 3 stars stating "Rypdal often alternates sections of great dissonance with near silence, or lonely sustained notes by just one or two instruments. It can have the sweeping starkness of a tracking shot over a fjord, but there's a certain coldness to it as well, and even confirmed fans of his jazz work may take a while to warm up to it."

Professional ratings
Review scores
Source	Rating
AllMusic	3/5 stars

== Track listing ==
All compositions by Terje Rypdal

1. "Quod erat demonstrandum, Opus 52 – 1st movement" - 4:56
2. "Quod erat demonstrandum, Opus 52 – 2nd movement" - 2:20
3. "Quod erat demonstrandum, Opus 52 – 3rd movement" - 4:55
4. "Quod erat demonstrandum, Opus 52 – 4th movement" - 4:52
5. "Quod erat demonstrandum, Opus 52 – 5th movement" - 18:21
6. "Largo, Opus 55" - 16:47

== Personnel ==
- Terje Rypdal – electric guitar
- Christian Eggen – conductor
  - Borealis Ensemble
