= Music for People (organization) =

American non-profit organization

- Abbreviation: MfP
- Formation: 1986
- Type: Non-profit organization
- Headquarters: Goshen, Connecticut, USA
- Members: 453 (2011)
- President of the Board: James Oshinsky, Ph.D.
- Executive Director: Eric Miller, Ph.D.
- Staff: 6
- Volunteers: 11
- Website: http://www.MusicForPeople.org/

Music for People (MfP) is a non-profit organization dedicated to music-making and music improvisation as a means of self-expression. Their primary activities include organizing workshops for improvisational music, hosting a four-year Musicianship and Leadership Program that provides training in music facilitation, and publishing various resources related to improvisational music.

Music for People was founded in 1986 by cellist David Darling and flautist Bonnie Insull. The core of the teaching methods center on Humanistic education.

Graduates of the Musicianship and Leadership Program facilitate a wide range of music events and programs such as drum circles and flute circles.

== Philosophy ==
The philosophy of Music for People is encapsulated in a Bill of Musical Rights that centers on the need for musical self-expression, authenticity, and acceptance of the full range of music traditions and the musical contributions of all people, regardless of their level of experience.

The approach to music facilitation is generally unconventional, using a playful teaching style developed by David Darling beginning with his work leading workshops as part of the Paul Winter Consort beginning in 1980. The approach to tonal and rhythmic improvisation has been found to have positive social influences, both similar to and contrasting with clinical music therapy approaches.

One of the core techniques used is ensemble playing, where participants have varying levels of musical experience, come from different genres of music, and often include instruments that typically do not play together.

Darling's dedication to Arts-in-Education innovation and creativity earned him the 1995 Artist of the Year Award from Young Audiences, Inc.

Music for People has prompted many offshoots, such as the Improv Collective at Fredonia University and the classical music program at DePauw University that incorporates music improvisation.

== Resources ==
The techniques used in music education have been published in a handbook on musical forms and structures, as well as a set of three CDs of interviews with David Darling and Julie Weber.

There are also supplementary information relating to the Musicianship and Leadership program relating to the development of activities in music workshops.

== Music Programs, University Courses, and Workshops by Graduates ==
Here are links to some of the music workshops that have been organized and facilitated by graduates of the Musicianship and Leadership program:

- David Rudge. "The Improv Collective".
- James Oshinsky. "Improvisation Ensemble" (PDF). Undergraduate course at Adelphi University, Garden City, New York.
- Mary Knysh. "Rhythmic Connections".
- Ron Kravitz. "Music in the Moment".
- Clint Goss; Lynn Miller; Eric Miller; Ron Kravitz. "Flute Haven Native Flute School".
- Randy Brody. "Sound Directions".
- James Oshinsky. "Music From The Heart".
