= Chaser (album) =

Studio album by Terje Rypdal
- Released: December 1985
- Recorded: May 1985
- Studios: Rainbow Studio; Oslo, Norway
- Genre: Jazz fusion
- Length: 44:25
- Label: ECM 1303
- Producer: Manfred Eicher

Terje Rypdal chronology
Eos (1984)	Chaser (1985)	Blue (1987)

Chaser is an album by Norwegian jazz guitarist Terje Rypdal recorded in May 1985 and released on the ECM December that same year. The trio features rhythm section Bjørn Kjellemyr and Audun Kleive.

== Reception ==
The AllMusic review by Michael P. Dawson awarded the album 4 stars stating "This 1985 release finds Rypdal working in a hard-hitting power-trio format."

Professional ratings
Review scores
Source	Rating
AllMusic	4/5 stars

== Track listing ==
All compositions by Terje Rypdal except as indicated

1. "Ambiguity" – 8:45
2. "Once upon a Time" – 6:16
3. "Geysir" (Bjørn Kjellemyr, Audun Kleive, Terje Rypdal) – 6:01
4. "A Closer Look" – 5:04
5. "Ørnen" – 6:23
6. "Chaser" – 5:51
7. "Transition" – 1:38
8. "Imagi (Theme)" – 4:59

== Personnel ==
- Terje Rypdal – electric guitar, keyboards (track 3)
- Bjørn Kjellemyr – acoustic bass, electric bass
- Audun Kleive – drums, percussion

=== Technical personnel ===
- Manfred Eicher – producer
- Jan Erik Kongshaug – engineer
- Dieter Rehm – design, cover photo
- Gert Chesi – liner photo
