= Pahonia (disambiguation) =

Pahonia is the Belarusial-language term for the coat of arms of the Grand Duchy of Lithuania.

Pahonia may also refer to:

- Pahonia, a historical national emblem of Belarus
- "Pahonia", a 1916 poem by Maksim Bahdanovič
  - Pahonia (song), a Belarusian song based on Bahdanovič's poem
- Pahonia Detachment, a group of Belarusian opposition volunteers, which was formed to defend Ukraine during the war in Donbas
- Pahonia Regiment, a group of Belarusian opposition volunteers, which was formed to defend Ukraine against the 2022 Russian invasion
