= Christian Eggen =

Norwegian composer, pianist and conductor

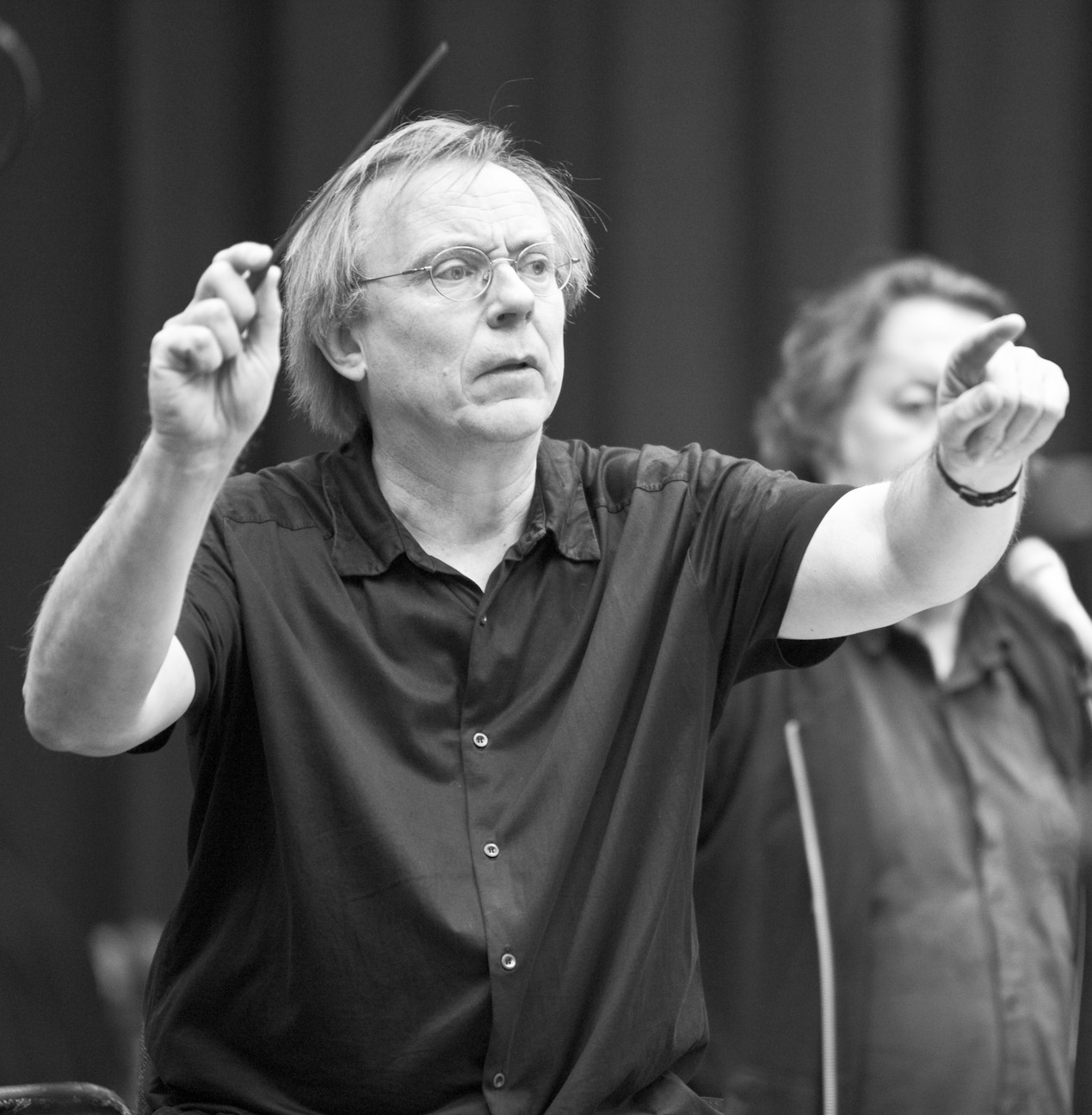
Christian Eggen

Christian Eggen (born 8 January 1957) is a Norwegian composer, pianist and conductor.
