= Terje Rypdal =

Norwegian jazz guitarist and composer (born 1947)

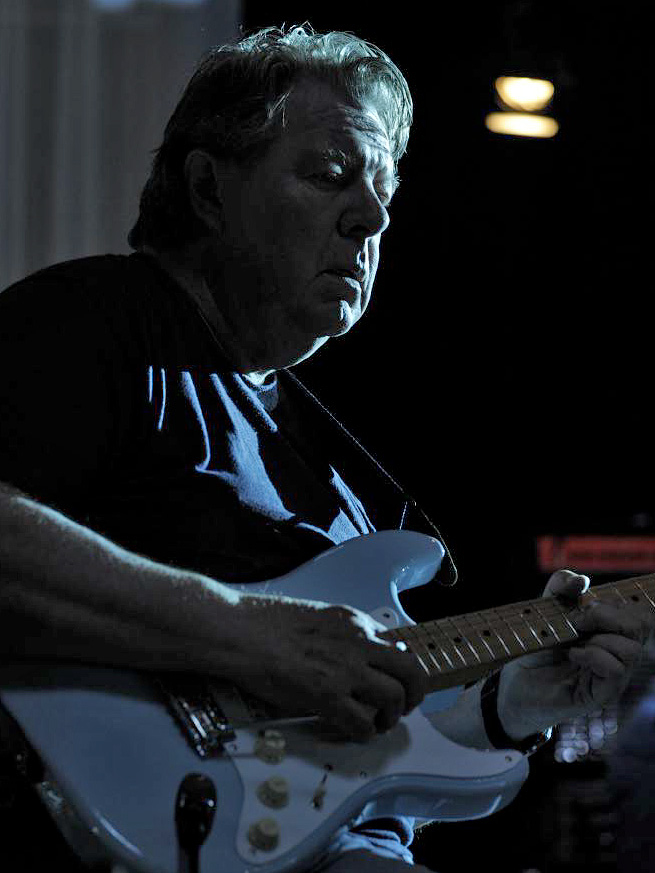
- Terje Rypdal, Moers Festival 2010

Background information
- Born: 23 August 1947 (age 78); Oslo, Norway
- Genres: Rock; jazz rock; surf rock; third stream; avant-garde rock; classical
- Occupations: Musician, composer
- Instrument: Guitar
- Years active: 1962–present
- Label: ECM

Terje Rypdal (born 23 August 1947) is a Norwegian guitarist and composer. He has been an important member in the Norwegian jazz community, and has also given show concerts with guitarists Ronni Le Tekrø and Mads Eriksen as "N3".

== Career ==
Rypdal was born in Oslo, Norway, the son of a composer and orchestra leader. He studied classical piano and trumpet as a child, and then taught himself to play guitar as he entered his teens. Starting out as a Hank Marvin-influenced rock guitarist with The Vanguards, Rypdal turned towards jazz in 1968 and joined Jan Garbarek's group and later George Russell's sextet and orchestra. An important step towards international attention was his participation in the free jazz festival in Baden-Baden, Germany, in 1969, where he was part of a band led by Lester Bowie. During his musical studies at Oslo university and conservatory, he led the orchestra of the Norwegian version of the musical Hair. He has often been recorded on the ECM record label, both jazz-oriented material and classical compositions (some of which do not feature Rypdal's guitar).

His compositions "Last Nite" and "Mystery Man" were featured in the Michael Mann film Heat, and included on the soundtrack of the same name.

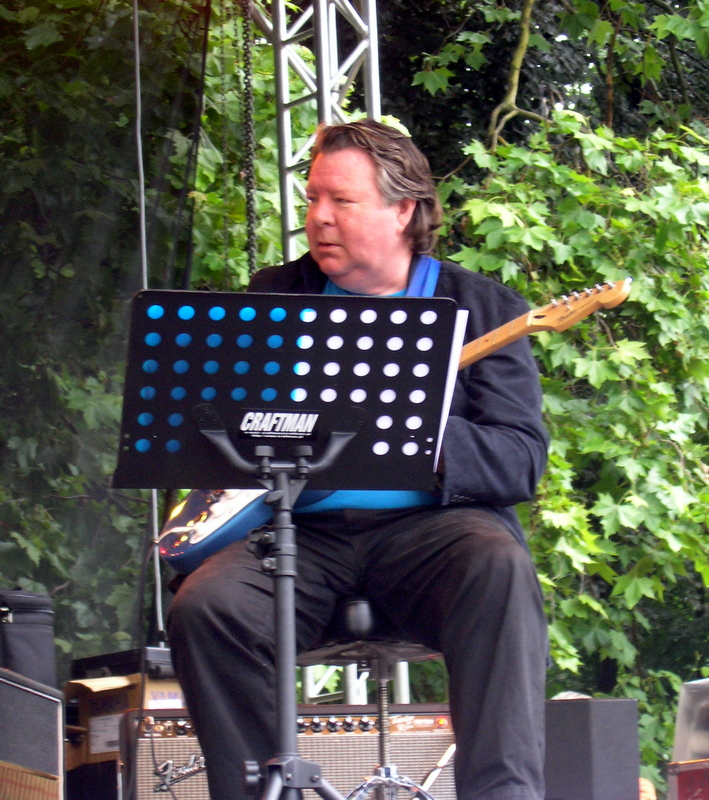
Terje Rypdal in Warsaw, 2005

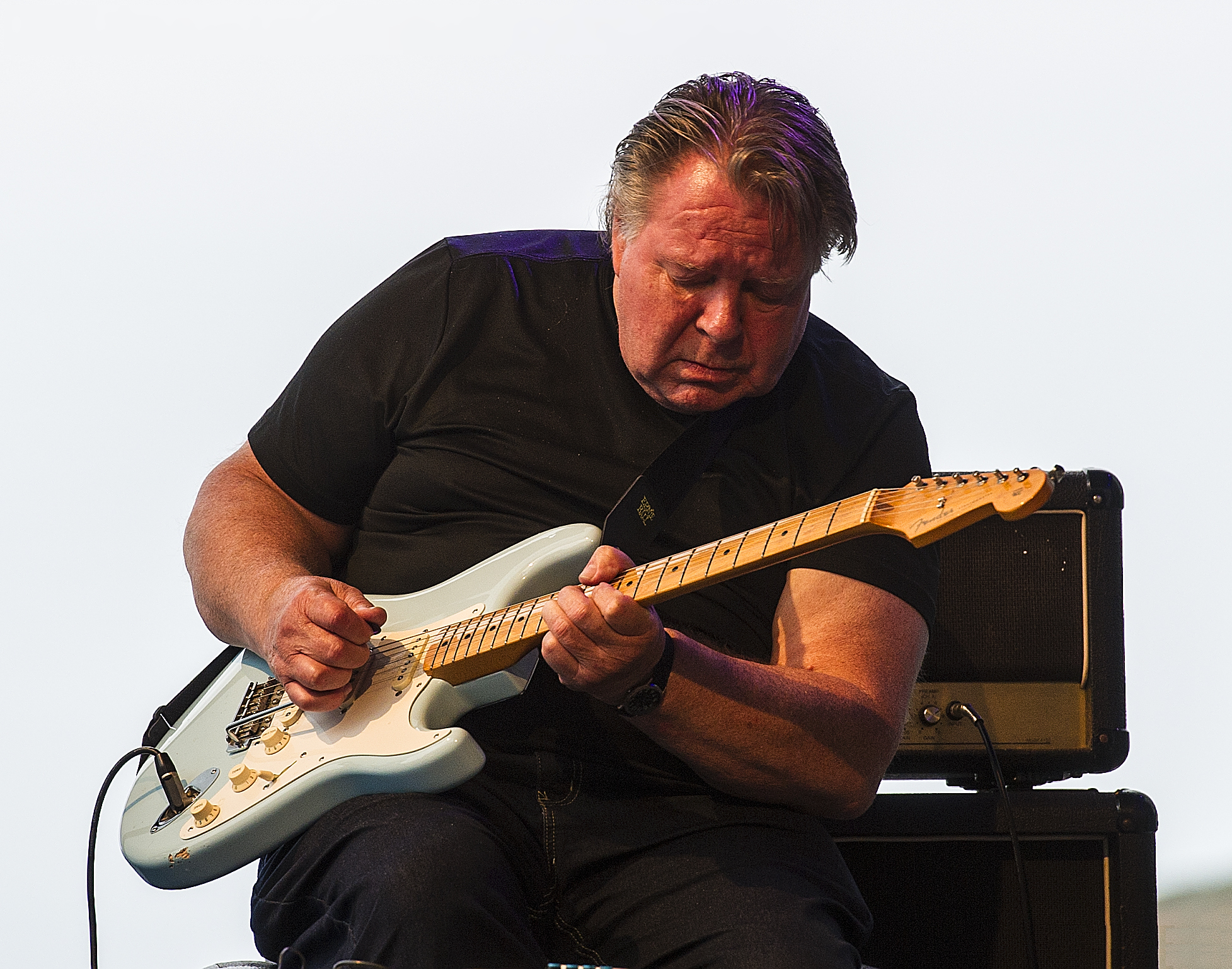
Rypdal in the Basque Country, 2016

== Personal life ==
Rypdal was married to the Norwegian singer Inger Lise Andersen/Rypdal from 1969 to 1985, and they had two children, the auditor Daniel (born 1970) and the electronica musician Marius (born 1977). Rypdal was married again in 1988 to Elin Kristin Bergei (born 28 May 1955). They have two children Ane Izabel (born 1988) and the guitarist Jakob Rypdal (born 1989). They (as of 2013) live in Tresfjord.

== Discography ==
Awards
Preceded by No Special award	Recipient of the Spellemannprisen Special award 1981	Succeeded by Jan Erik Kongshaug
Preceded by Jon Balke	Recipient of the Buddyprisen; 1985	Succeeded by Thorgeir Stubø
Preceded by Bjørn Alterhaug	Recipient of the Jazz Gammleng-prisen; 1990	Succeeded by Kristian Bergheim
Preceded by No Open class award	Recipient of the Spellemannprisen Open class 1995	Succeeded by Mari Boine
Preceded by No Open class award	Recipient of the Spellemannprisen Honorary award 2005	Succeeded by Åge Aleksandersen, Bjørn Eidsvåg & Sissel Kyrkjebø
