= Thirty-Two Aspects of Customs and Manners =

Series of ukiyo-e works by Tsukioka Yoshitoshi

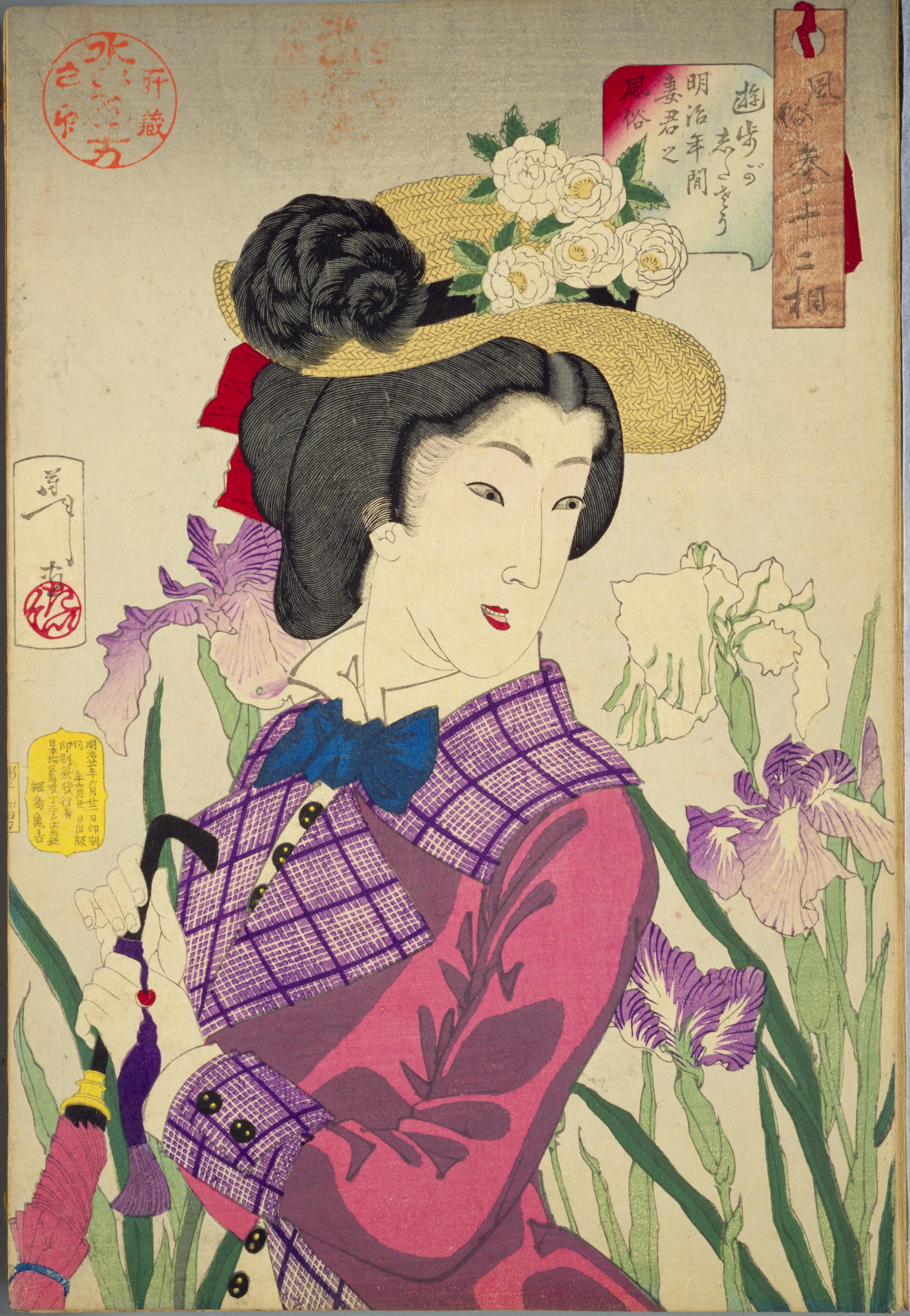
Strolling: Habits of the wife of a nobleman of the Meiji era, the last work in the series. It depicts an upper-class woman wearing a straw hat with styled hair, Western clothes and an umbrella. She is shown walking among irises, possibly in the Horikiri Iris Garden, a common motif in other similar prints during the Edo period.

Thirty-Two Aspects of Customs and Manners (Japanese: 風俗三十二相, Hepburn: Fūzoku Sanjūnisō), also known as Thirty-Two Aspects of Daily Life and Thirty-Two Aspects of Women, is a series of ukiyo-e woodblock prints by Tsukioka Yoshitoshi that was published in 1888 (Meiji 21).

The series consists of 32 large-format prints (33 including the title page) depicting beautiful women. The series depicts various social classes from the late Edo period Kansei era through to the Meiji era, and is highly regarded as a masterpiece and representative work of Yoshitoshi's bijin-ga prints. The series was published by Shimazendo Tsunashima Kamekichi of Nihonbashi Bakurochō.

Yoshitoshi, along with kabuki actor Ichikawa Danjūrō IX, was an advocate for the preservation of Edo period traditions during the influence of Western culture in Japan during the Meiji period, and this transition is visible in the series. The last print of the series, Strolling: Habits of the wife of a nobleman of the Meiji era, is a rare example of Yoshitoshi choosing to depict Western influences in his work.

== Background ==
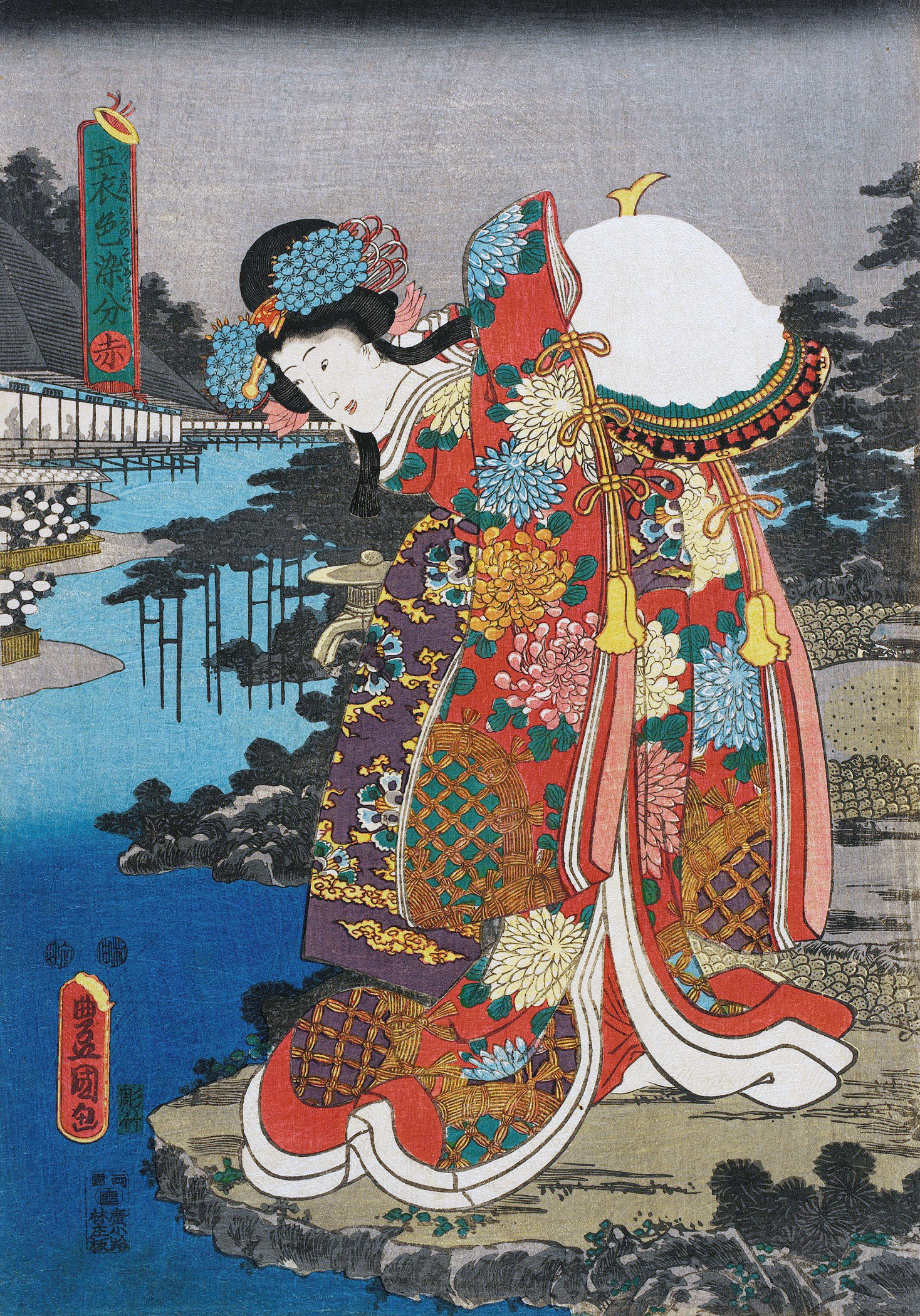
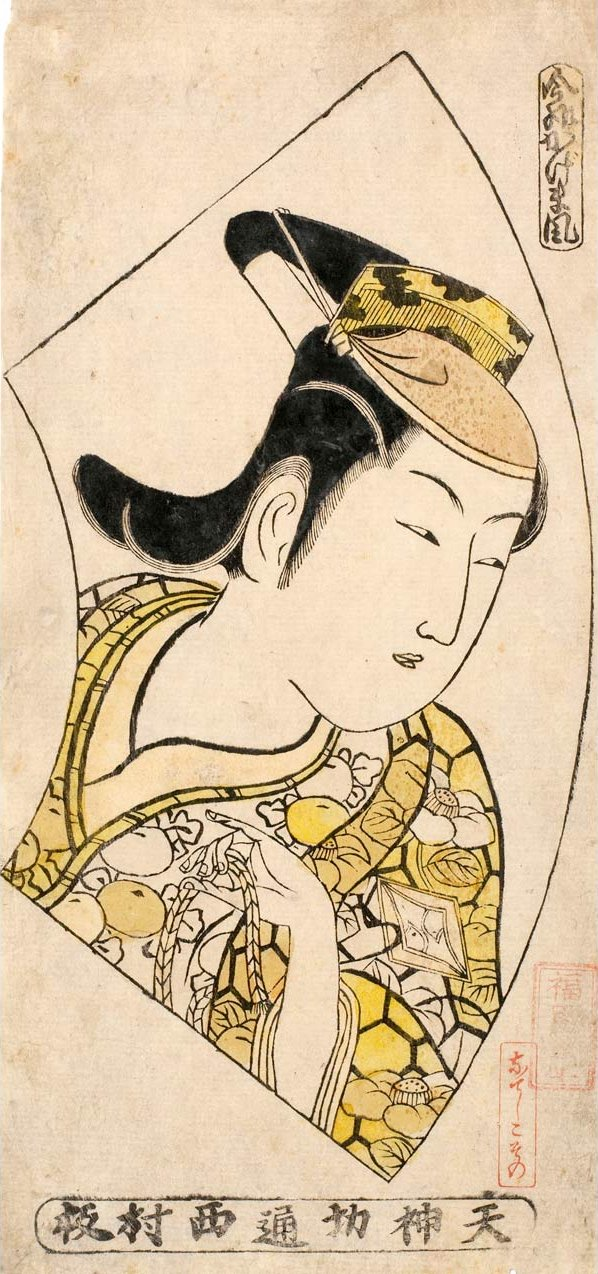
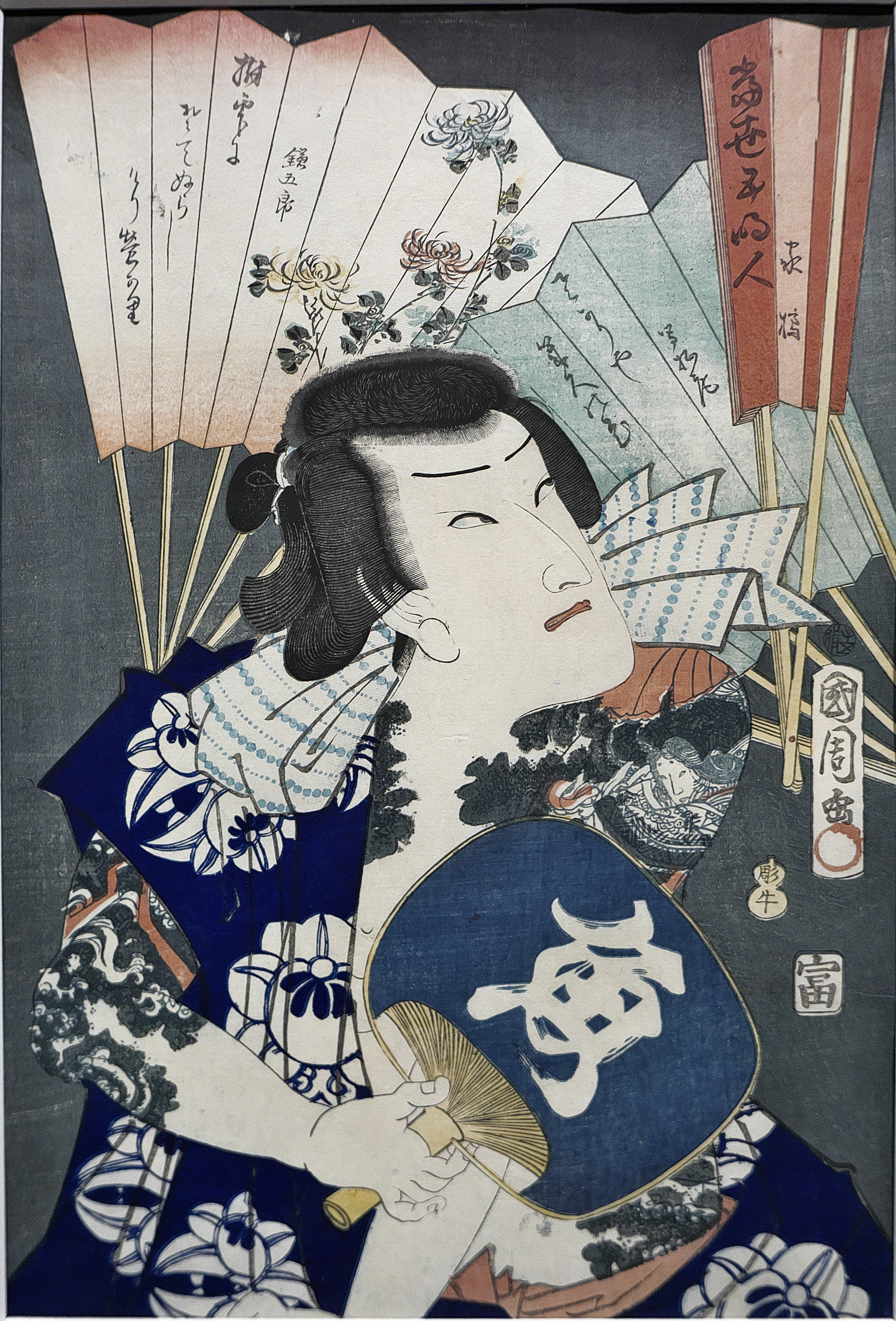
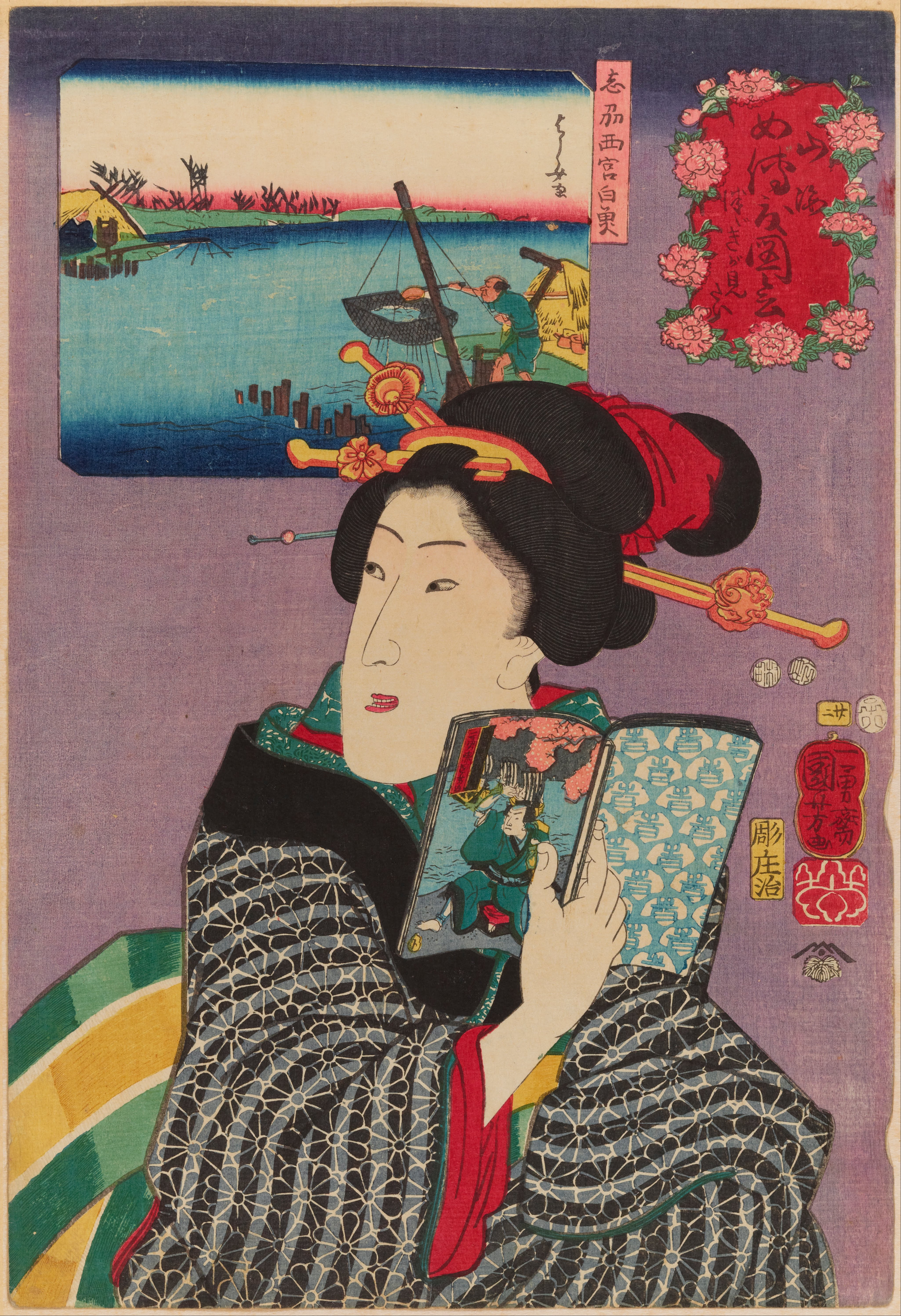
Yoshitoshi took inspiration from several other ukiyo-e artists for his series. Clockwise from the left: works by Utagawa Kunisada, Nishimura Shigenobu, Utagawa Kuniyoshi, and Toyohara Kunichika.

=== Title and inspiration ===
"Thirty-Two Marks" is originally a Buddhist term referring to the thirty-two excellent physical characteristics of a Buddha, such as the ushnisha and halo, that later came to be used to refer to the beauty of a woman's appearance and figure. The comparison of the thirty-two marks to female physical features can already be seen in ukiyo-e works such as Nishimura Shigenobu's "Thirty-Two Marks and Features" from the Kyōhō and Genbun eras. Examples from Yoshitoshi's time that are thought to have directly influenced him include Utagawa Kunisada's "Contemporary Thirty-Two Marks" and "Modern Thirty-Two Marks" and Toyohara Kunichika's "Current Thirty-Two Visions." Additionally, elements of the subjects and compositions from the series show learning from and imitation of his master Utagawa Kuniyoshi.

=== Composition ===
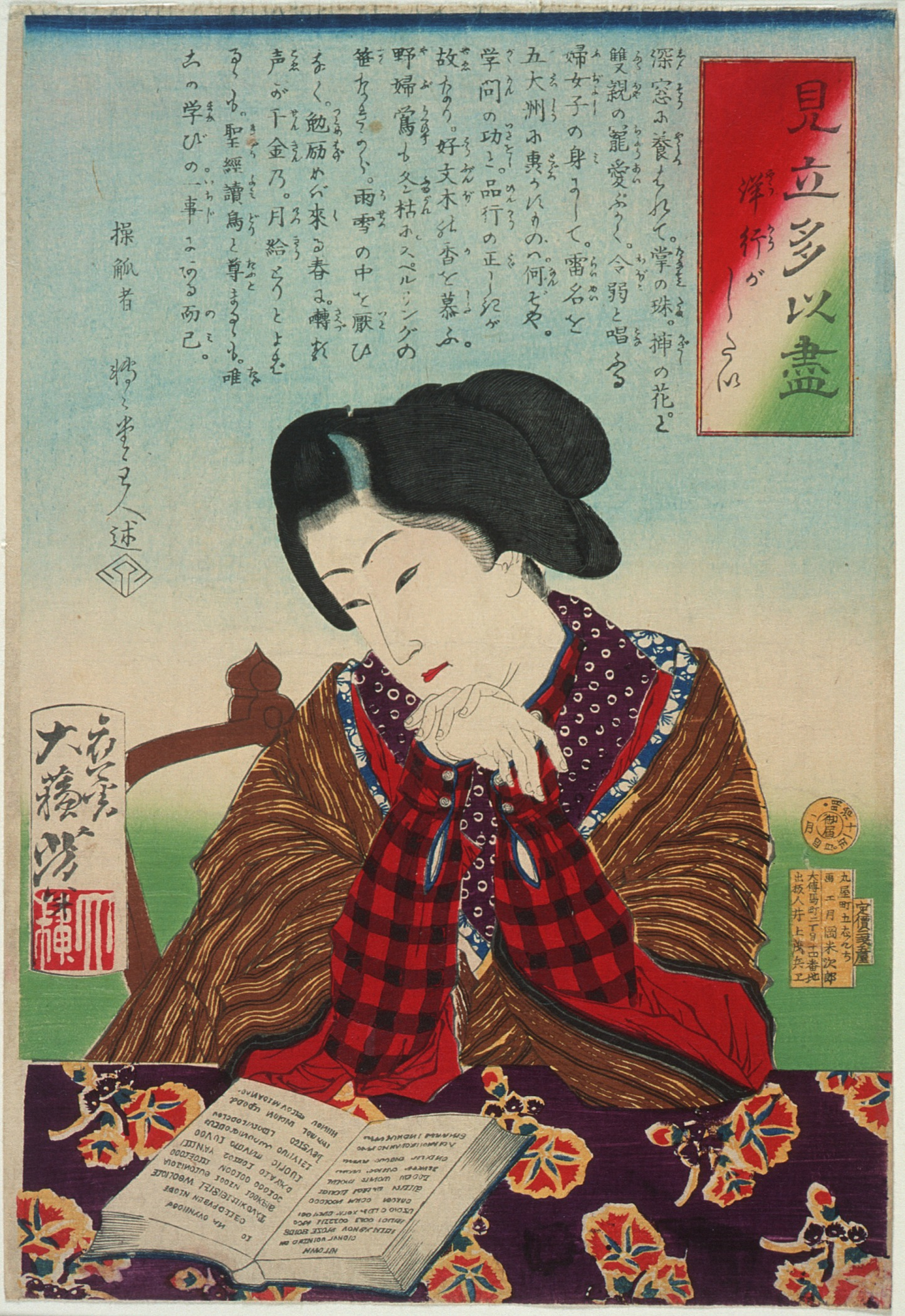
Yōkō gashitai (洋行 がしたい), generally translated into English as "I Want to Go Abroad", from Yoshitoshi's Collection of Desires series. In this series, the feelings of the subjects are revealed to the viewer through wordplay.

The titles of the 32 works all include the word "sō", which indicates a woman's demeanour, and are accompanied by subtitles that describe the era and social status of the women depicted, such as "Habits of a concubine of the Kaei era". The word sō had also been used by other ukiyo-e artists such as Kunisada and Utamaro, and before its usage in ukiyo-e, was used by physiognomists that studied a person's character based on their physical appearance.

Starting from the Kansei era, nearly a hundred years before Yoshitoshi's time, the series portrays each era through Kyōwa, Bunka, Bunsei, Tenpō, Kōka, Kaei, and Ansei, then skips the approximately eight years from the late Bakumatsu period of Bunkyū to Keiō, and continues into the Meiji era. It consists of 23 works depicting women of the Edo period and 9 works depicting women of the Meiji period, reflecting Yoshitoshi's nostalgia for bygone eras of Japanese history.

In terms of focusing on women's emotions, another of Yoshitoshi's series, Collection of Desires, a collection of mitate-e works, shares a common concept. In this series, the title of each work contains the phrase "I want to," and playful texts explaining the women's inner feelings are found in the margins. In contrast, Thirty-Two Aspects of Customs and Manners eliminates explanations outside of the title and attempts to depict the women's inner emotions solely through their facial expressions and body movements.

=== Carving and printing ===
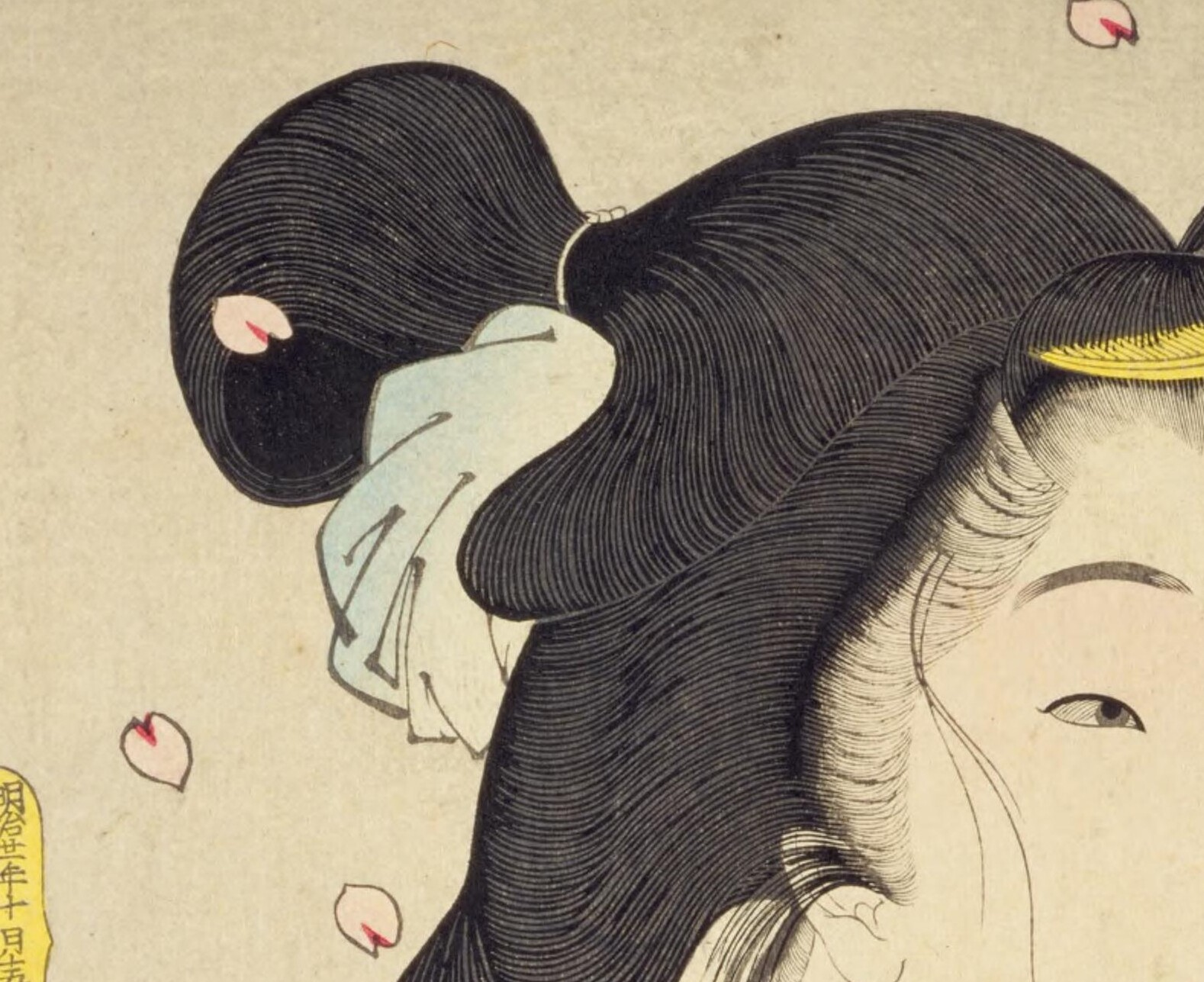
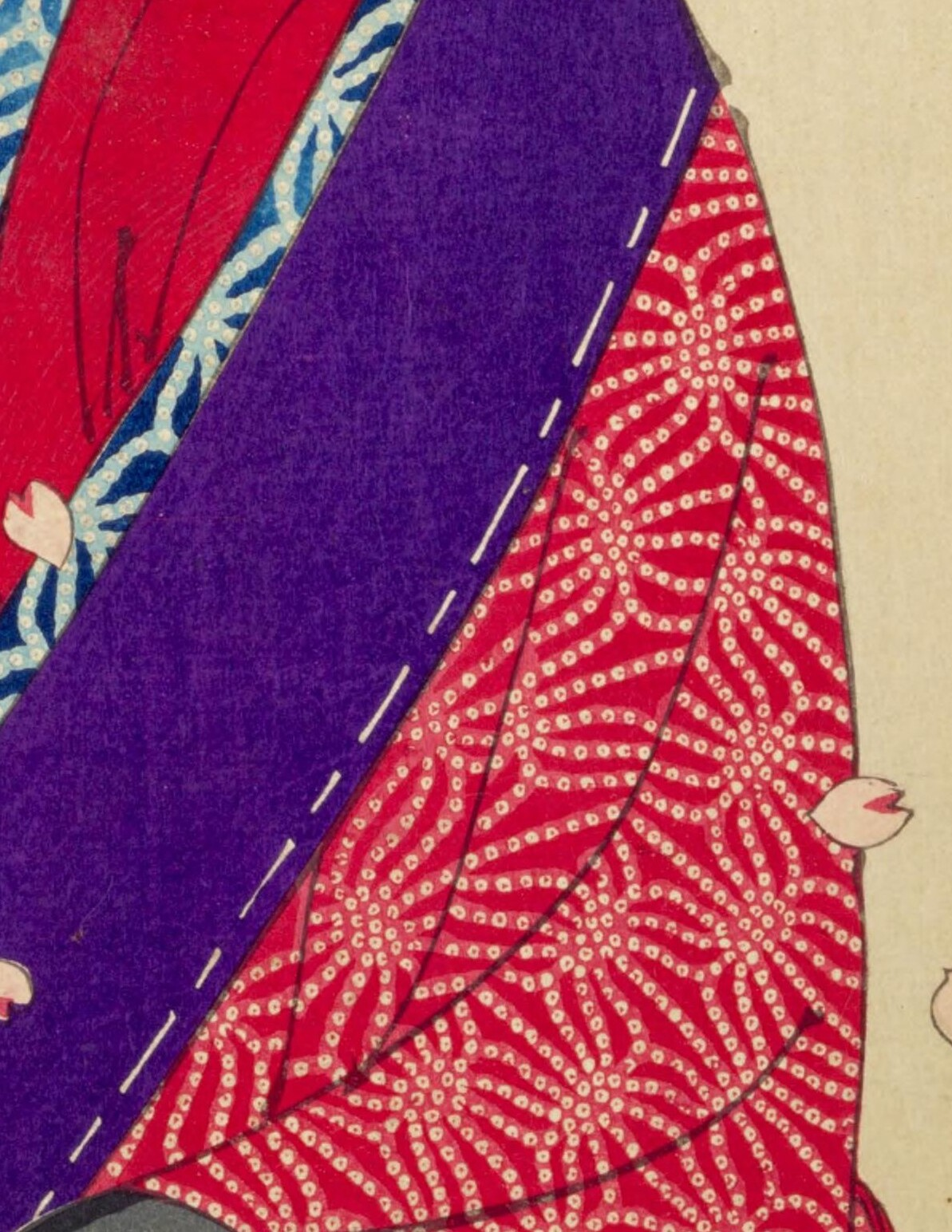
Detail of Eager: Habits of an oiran of the Kaei era. Yoshitoshi told the carvers who carved the works for the series to follow his original drawings exactly.

In this series, particular attention is paid to carving and printing to express feminine beauty. The technique of carving individual hairs along the hairline is an advanced method handled by master craftsmen. In this piece, multiple lines are carved within 1 millimetre intervals, and the same technique is applied to eyebrows and eyelashes. Regarding hair, Yoshitoshi is said to have specifically instructed the engraver to carve exactly as in his original drawings. The engraver's attention to detail is also evident in the intricate patterns on the women's kimonos.

In the sixth print of the series, "Smoky: Habits of a housewife of the Kyōwa era", shades of smoke are expressed by adding a light brown gradient to the grey smoke. One of Yoshitoshi's pupils, Toshiaki, was allowed to choose the colours of the woman's yukata and expressed the importance of it looking like a real yukata. Another of his pupils, Kodô, used the print as an example of the quality of work that could be produced if an artist and printer worked closely with each other.

All but four of the works were carved by Wada Hori Yū.

== Evaluation ==
In this work, the psychology of women from the Edo and Meiji periods is expressed in a way that is emotionally rich and easily understandable to modern viewers, and it is noteworthy that it goes beyond merely depicting beautiful portraits to explore inner character. Additionally, over a span of about one hundred years from the Kansei to the Meiji era, it depicts a wide range of women, including those in various occupations such as geisha, courtesans, court ladies, and young attendants, and women of different ages and social statuses such as wives, concubines, and daughters, as well as regional differences from areas such as Edo (now Tokyo), Kyoto and Nagoya. By distinguishing their hairstyles, clothing, accessories, and makeup, it holds significant value as historical material documenting customs and culture of Edo and Meiji period Japan.

== Gallery ==
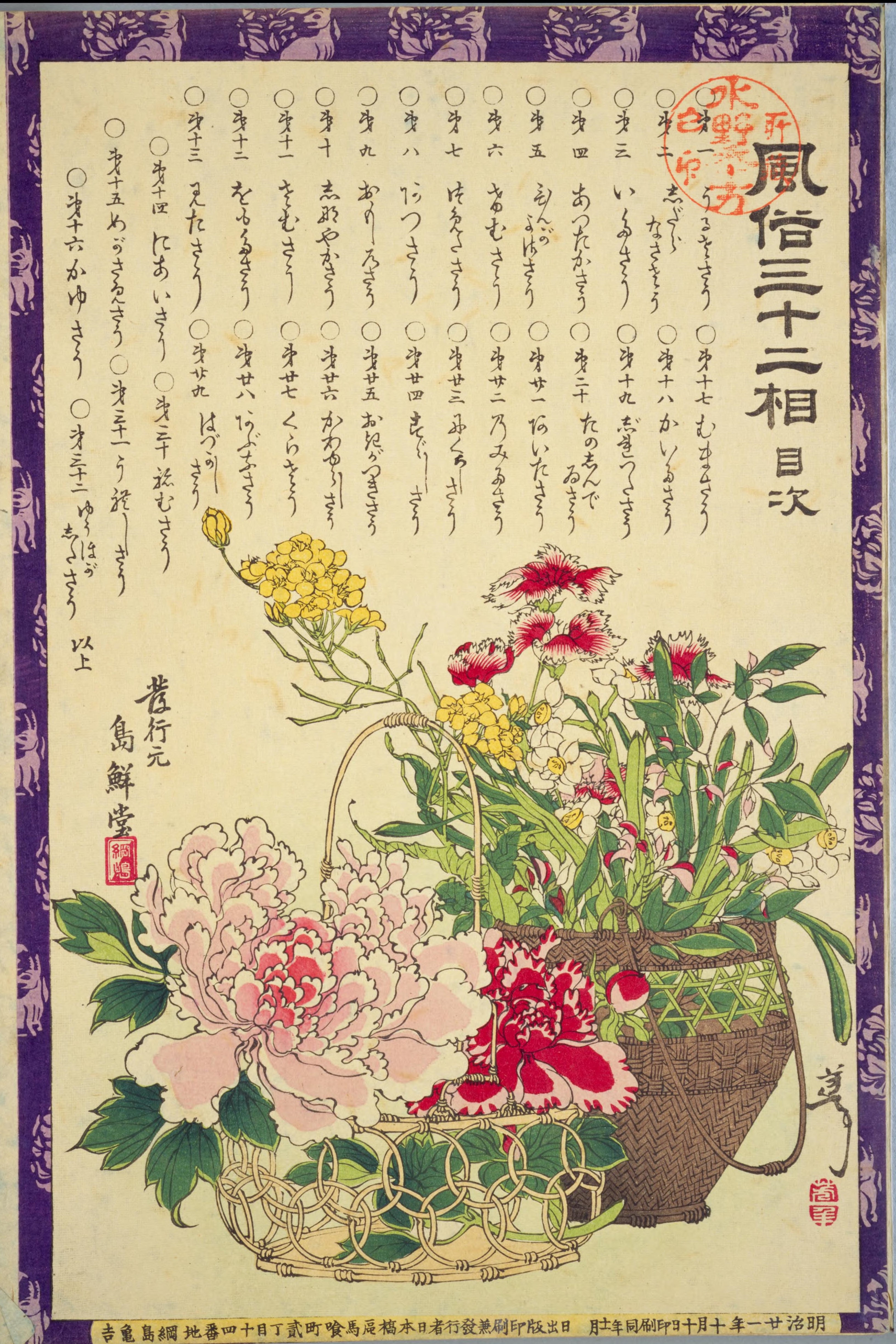
32 Aspects of Customs and Manners: Table of Contents

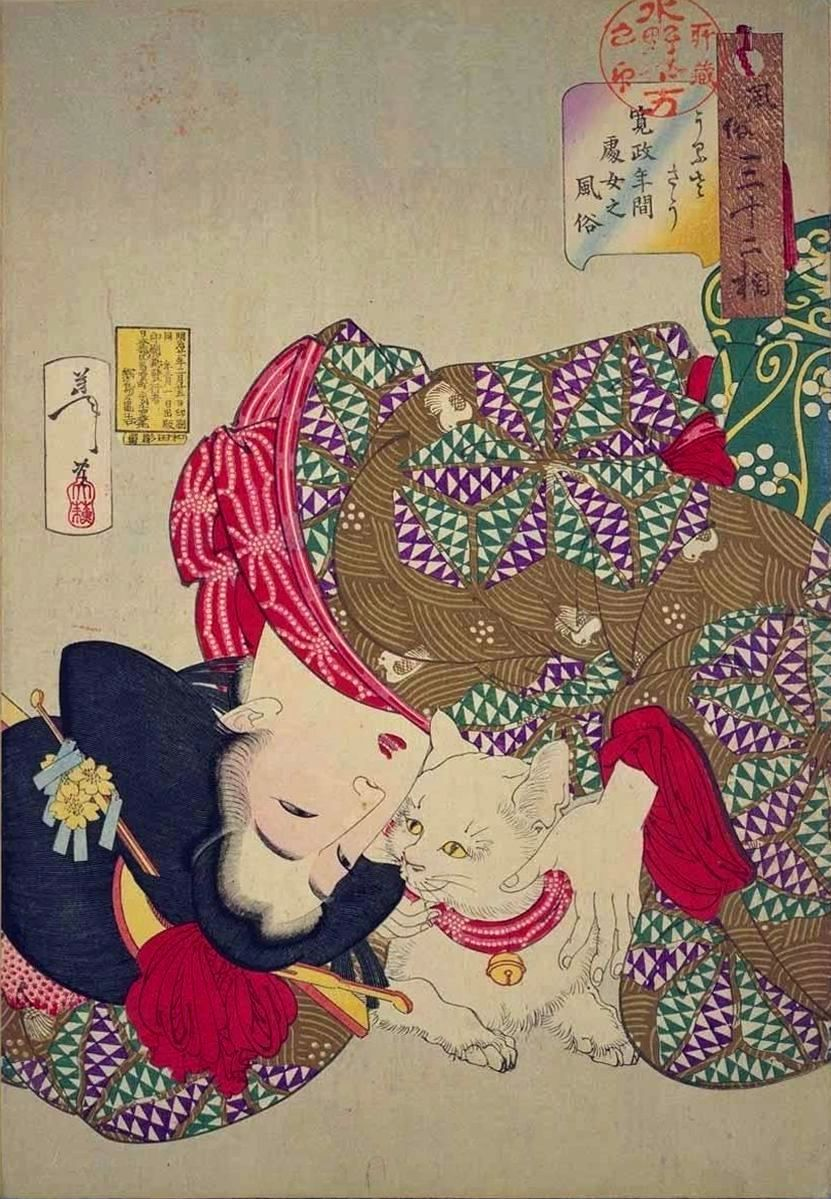
Tiresome/Noisy: Habits of a virgin of the Kansei era

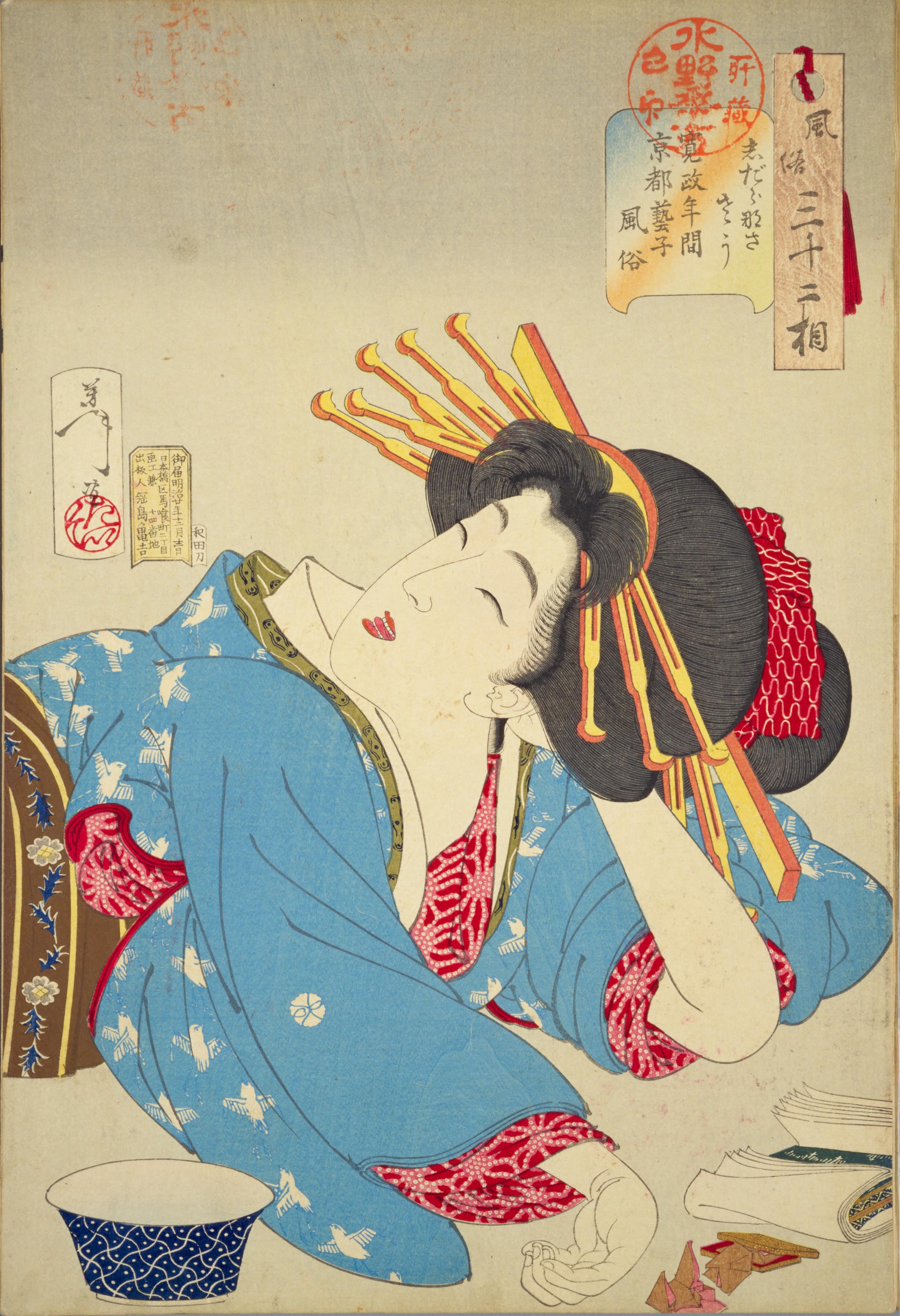
Loose: Habits of a geisha of Kyōto of the Kansei era

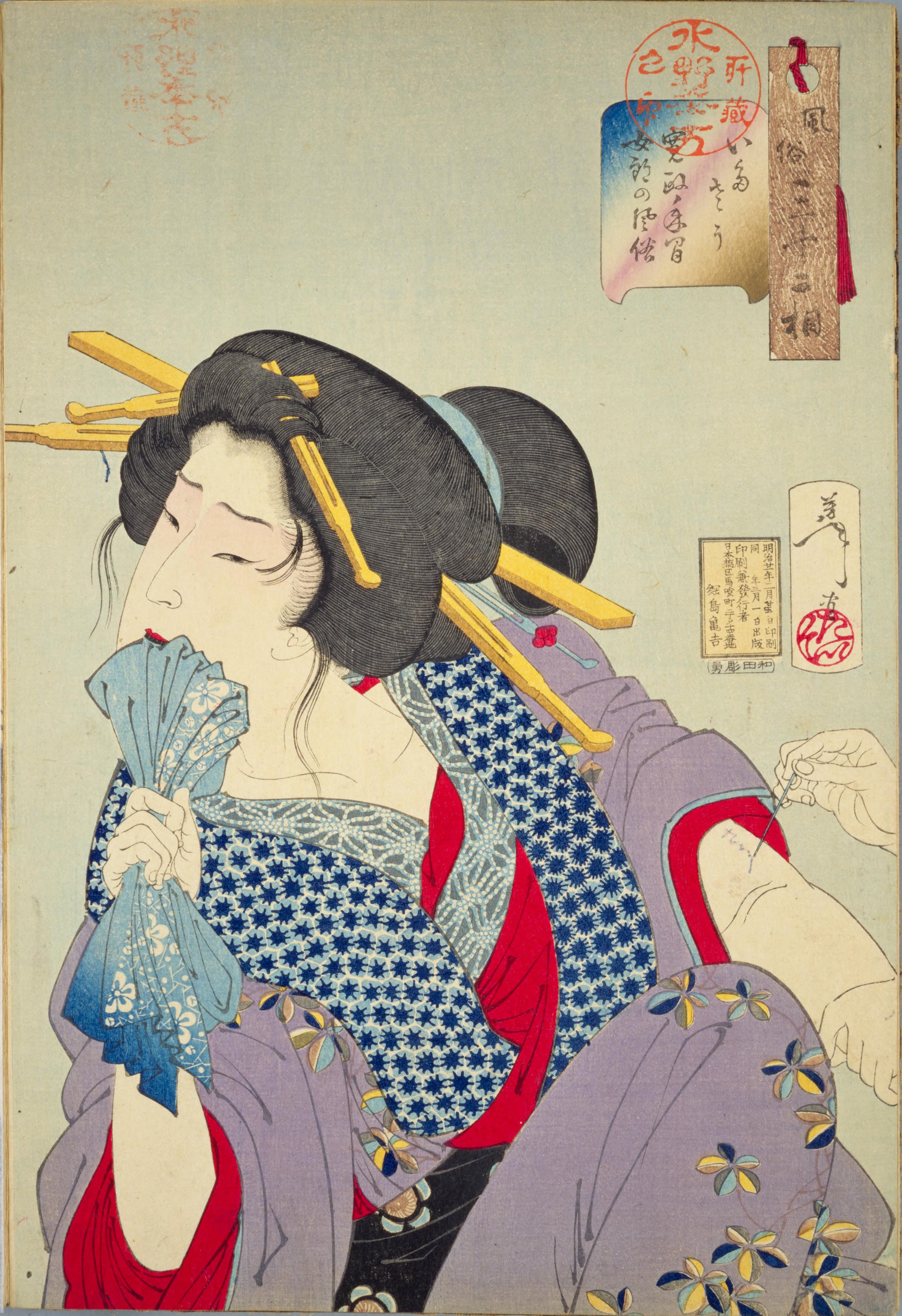
Painful: Habits of a prostitute of the Kansei era

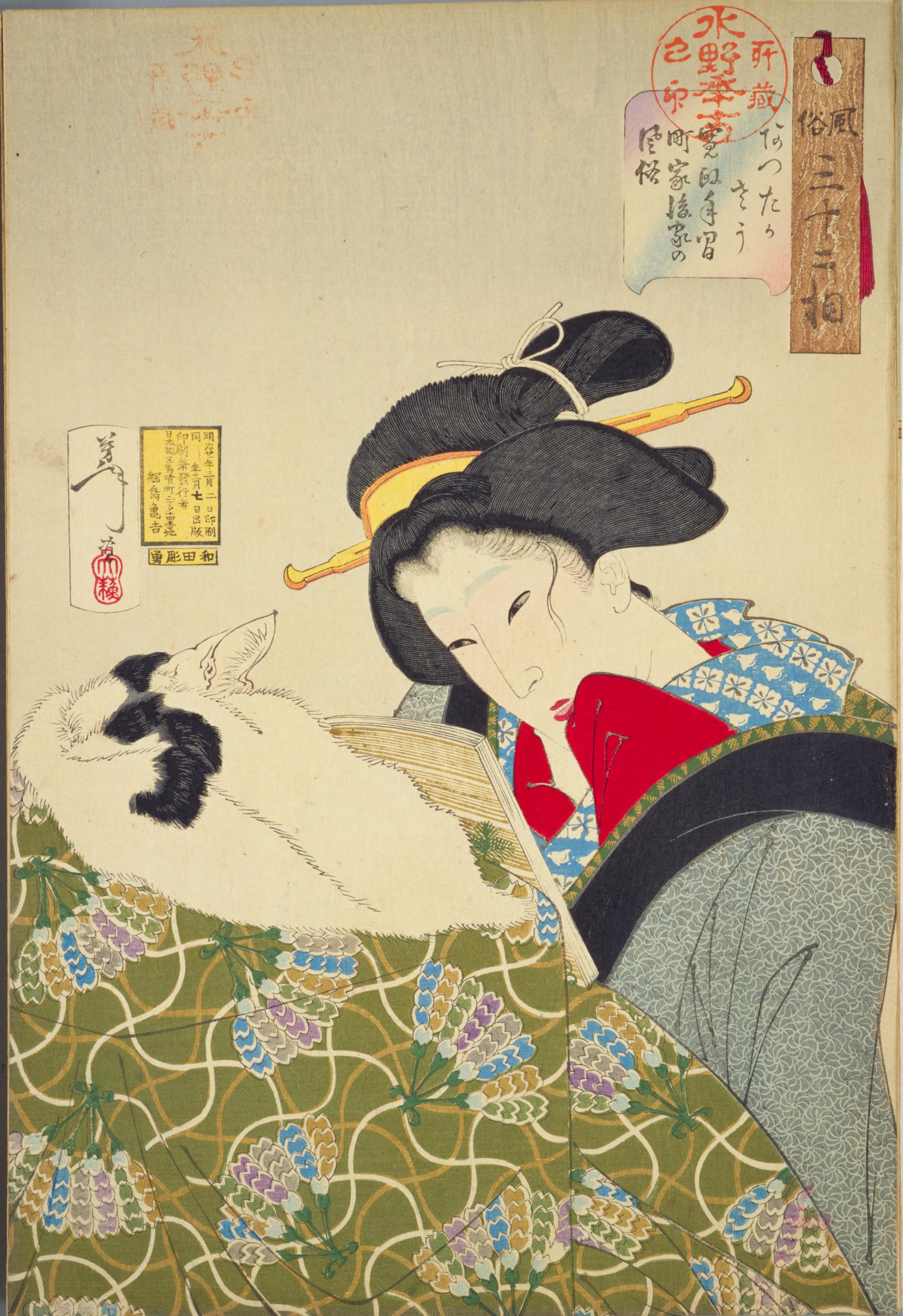
Warm: Habits of an urban widow of the Kansei era

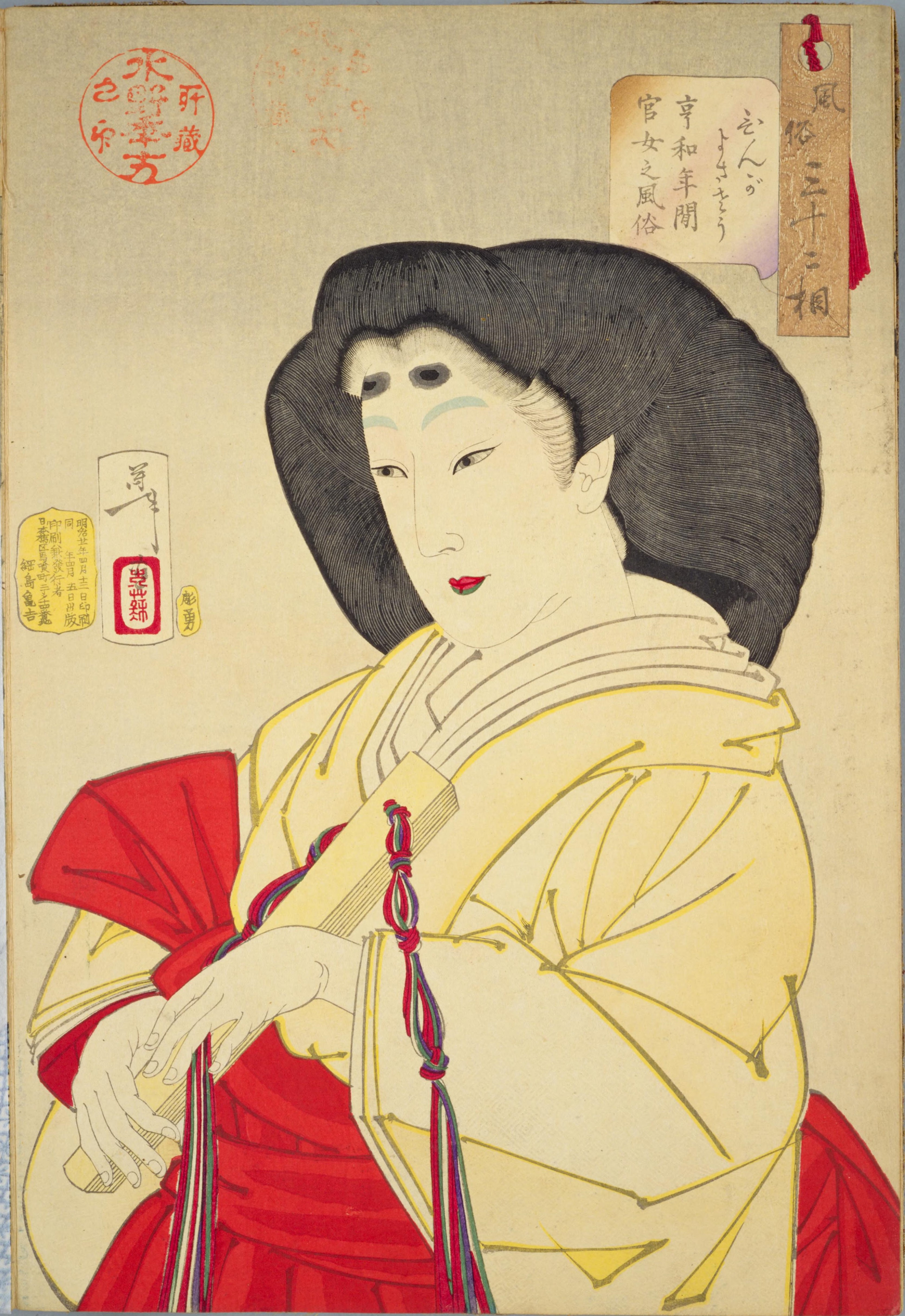
Elegant: Habits of a lady of the Imperial court in the Kyōwa era

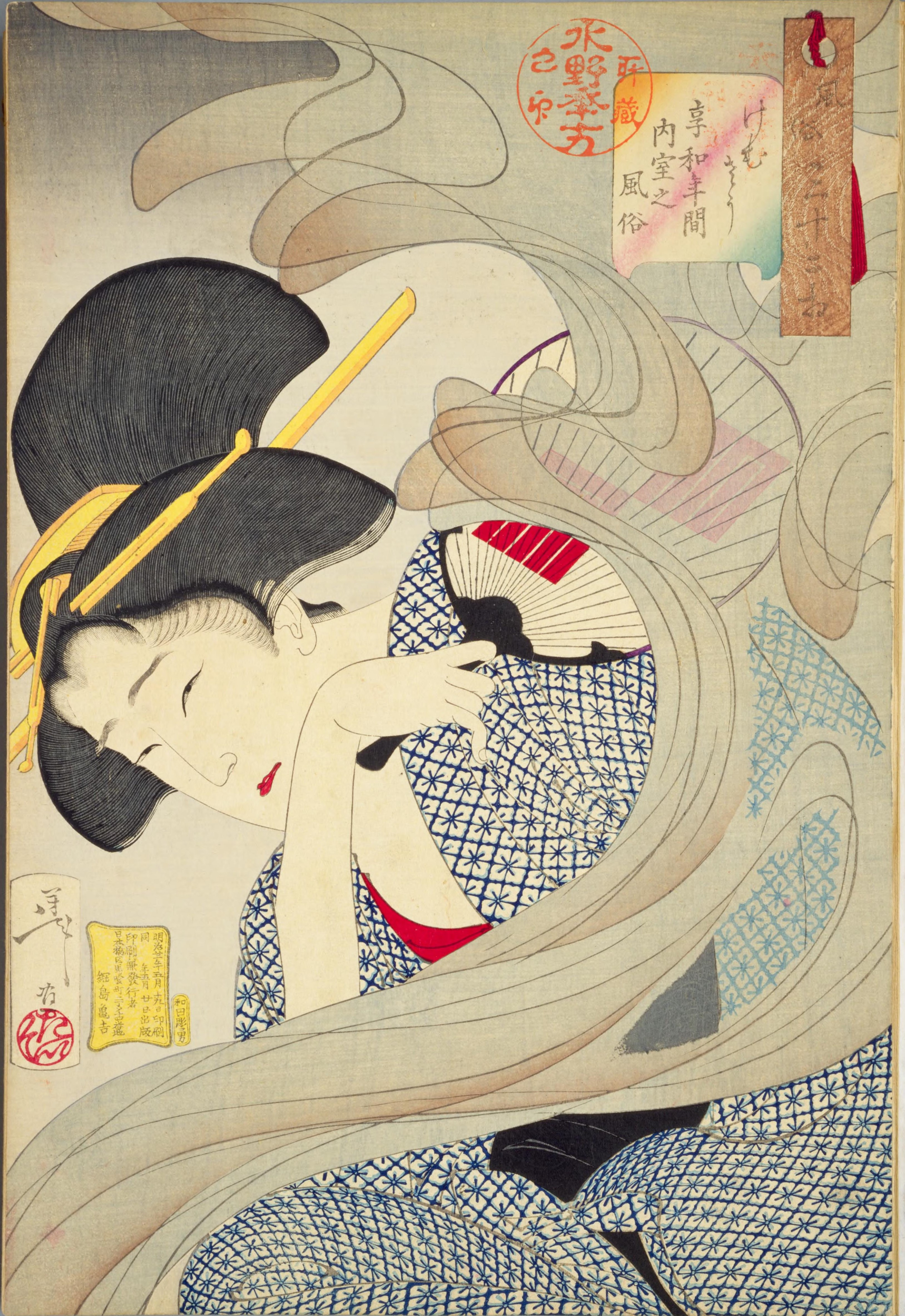
Smoky: Habits of a housewife of the Kyōwa era

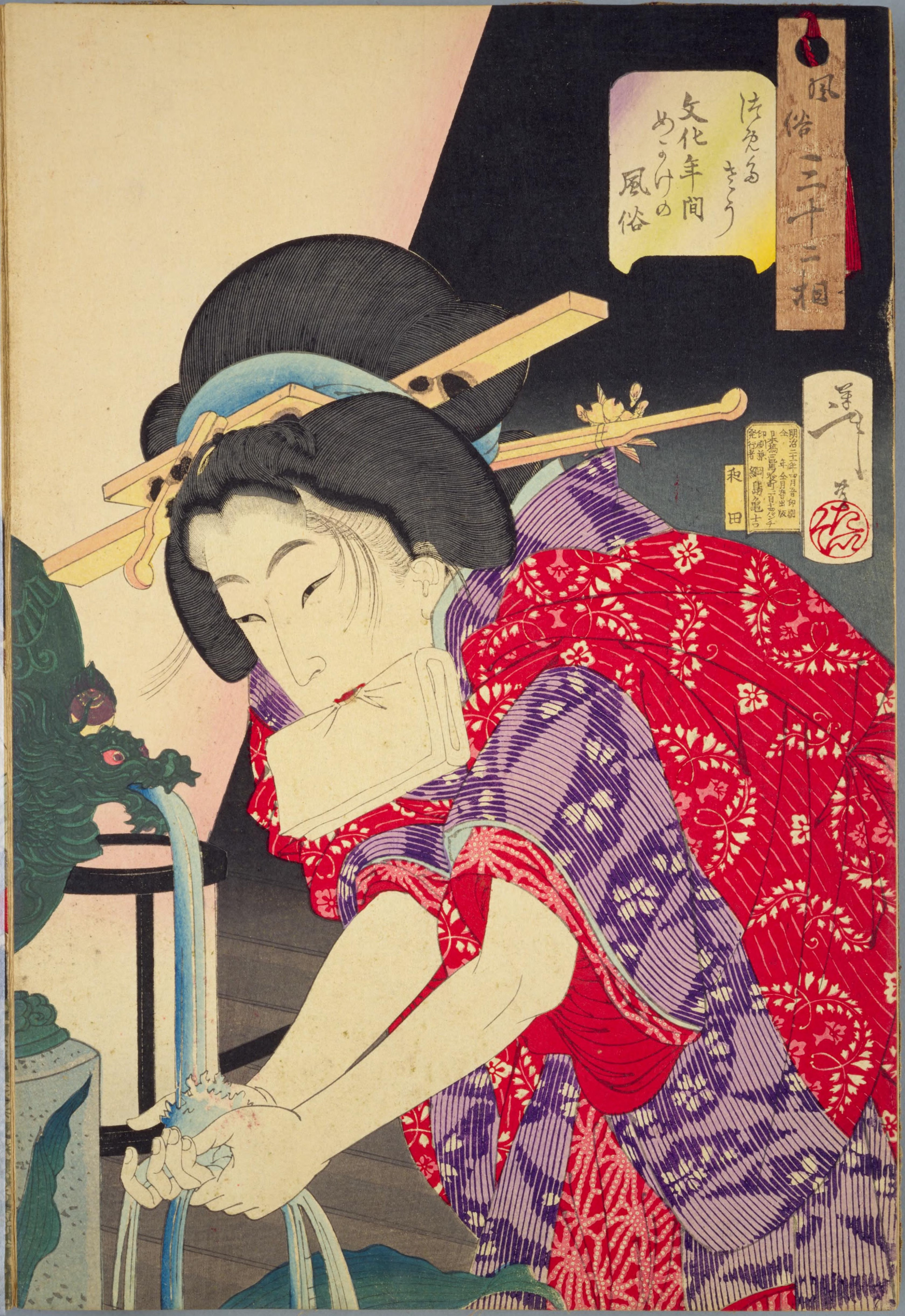
Chilly: Habits of a concubine of the Bunka era

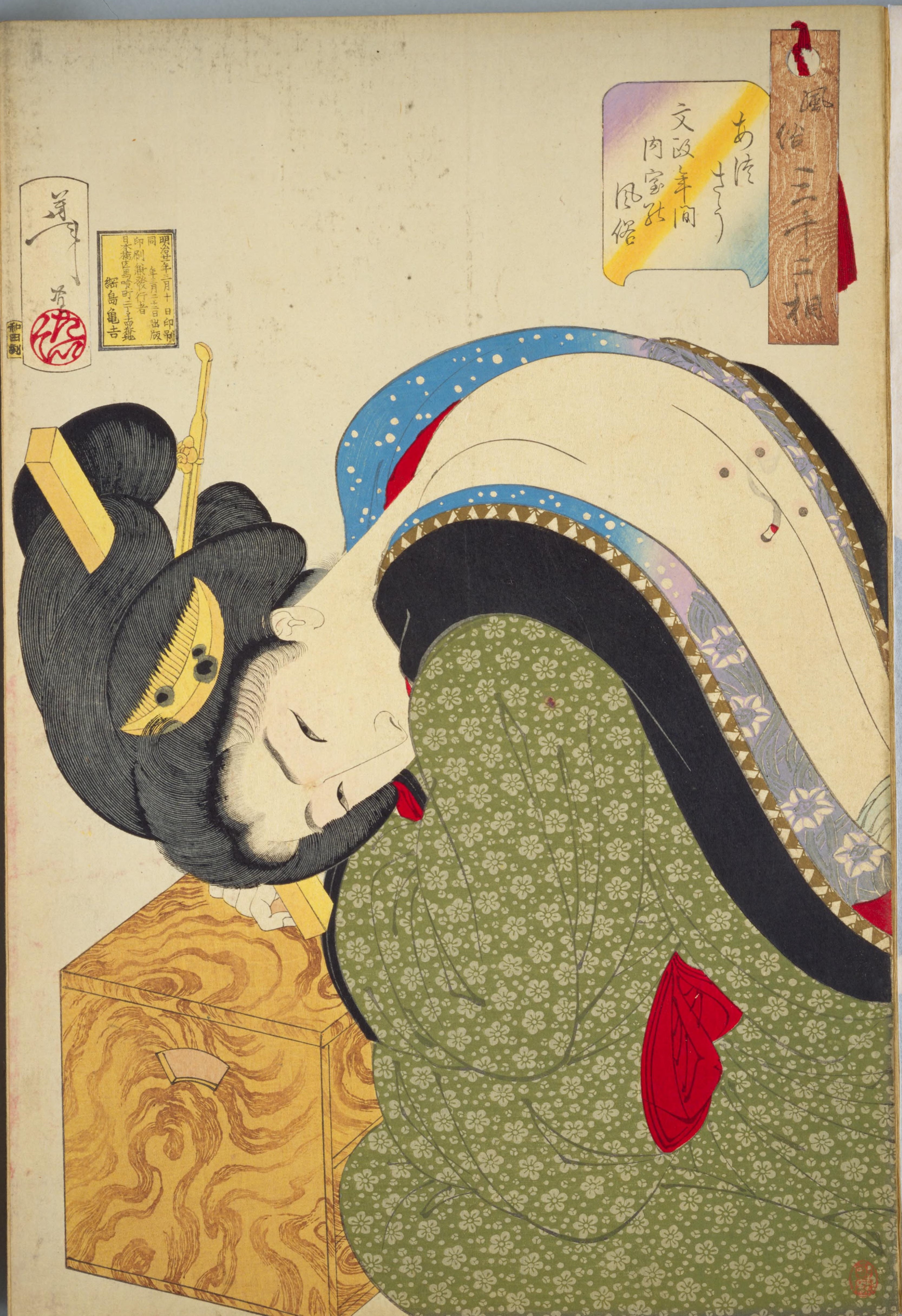
Hot: Habits of a wealthy housewife of the Bunsei era

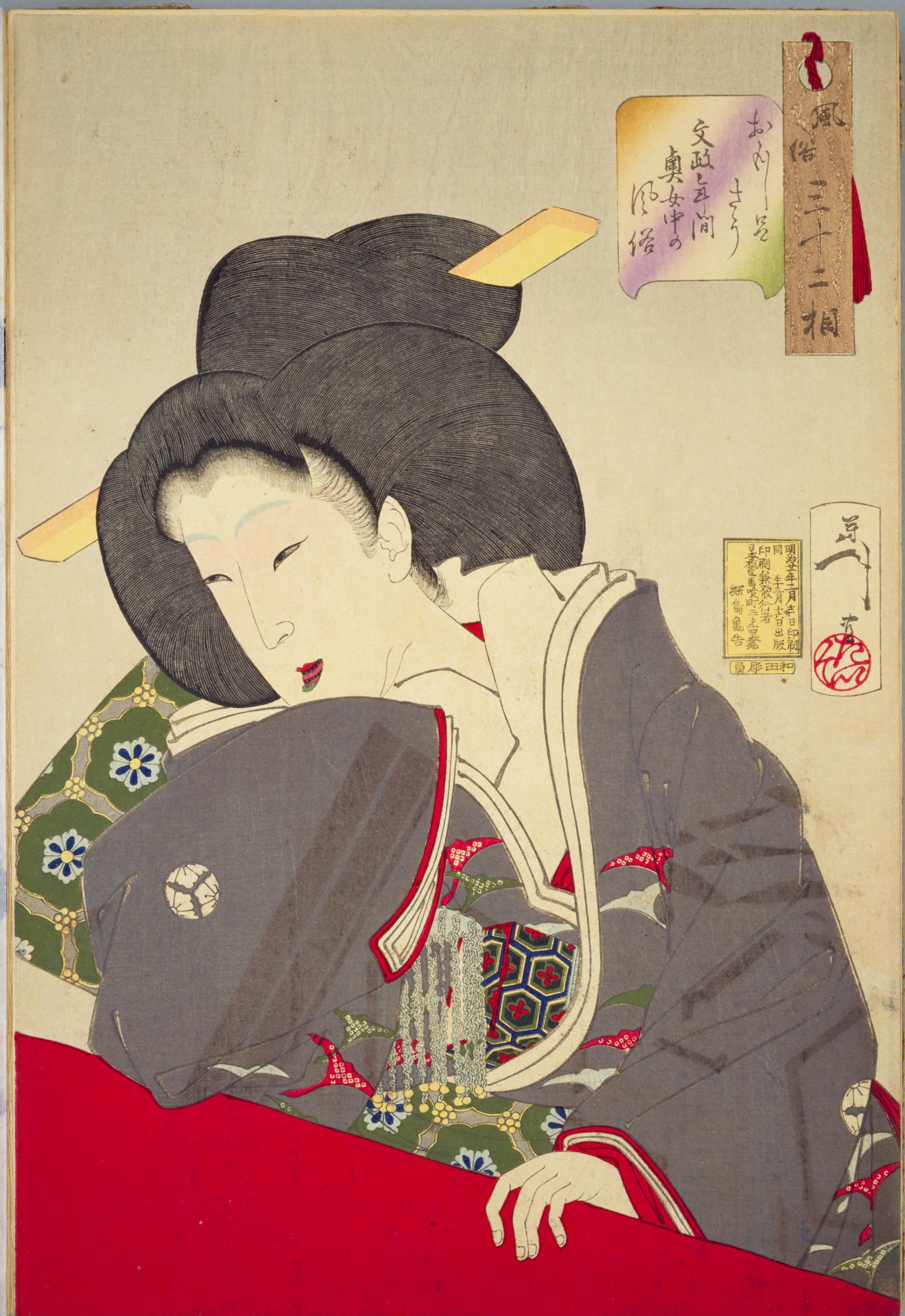
Amused: Habits of a high-ranking lady-in-waiting of the Bunsei era

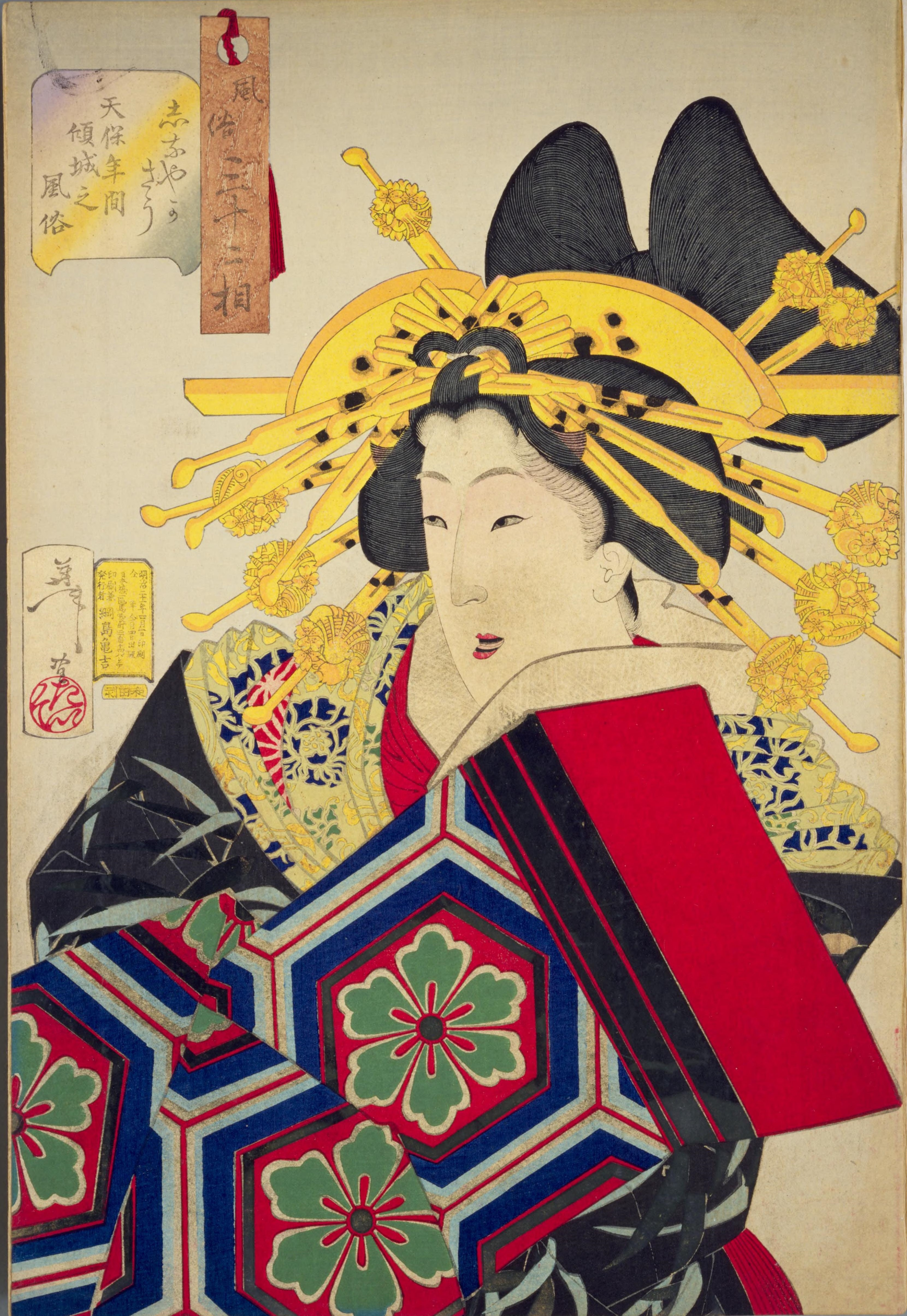
Feminine: Habits of a keisei (Note: Keisei were the highest-ranking courtesans in Japan.) of the Tempō era

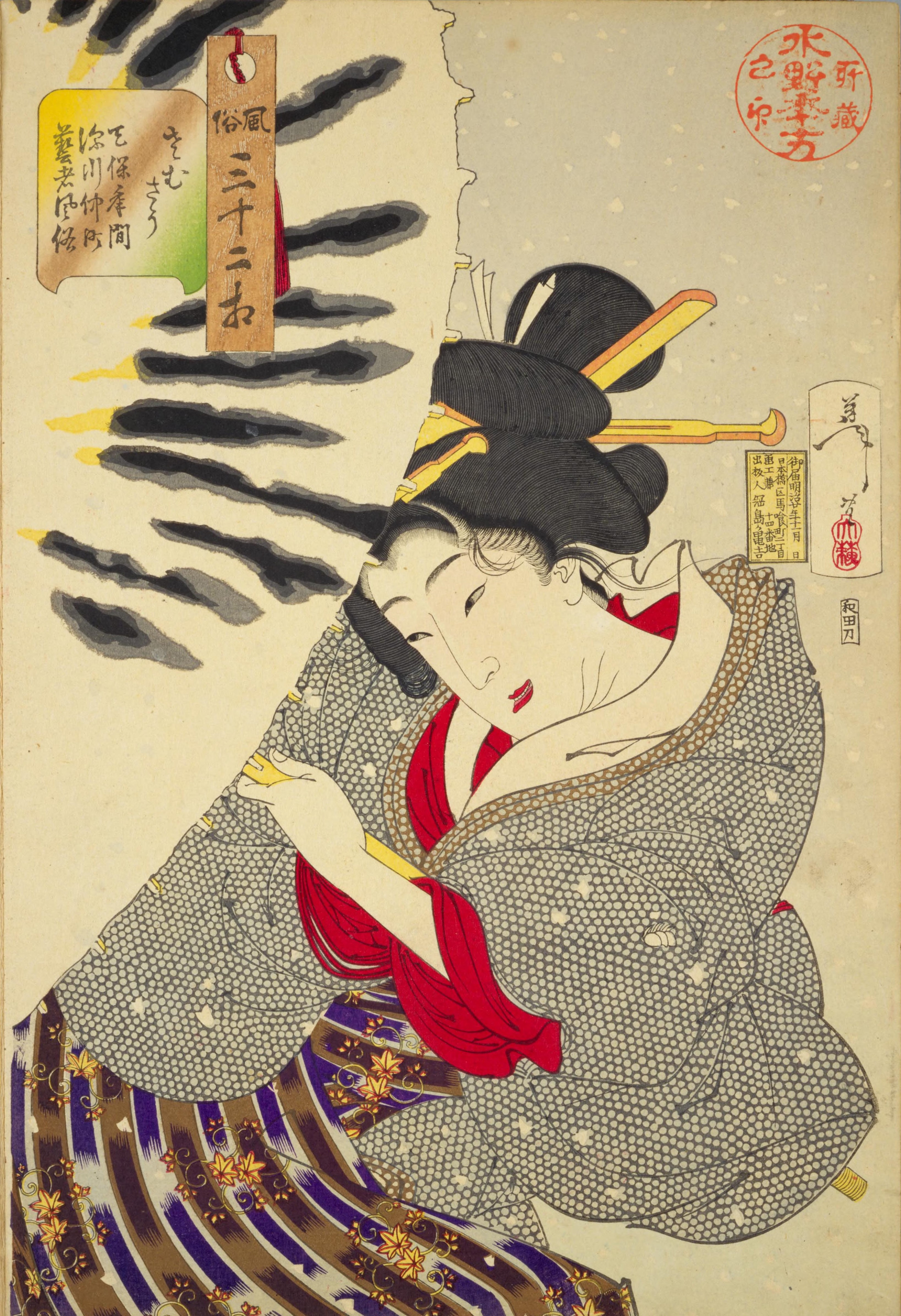
Frozen: Habits of a geisha of the Nakamachi district of Fukagawa in the Tempō era

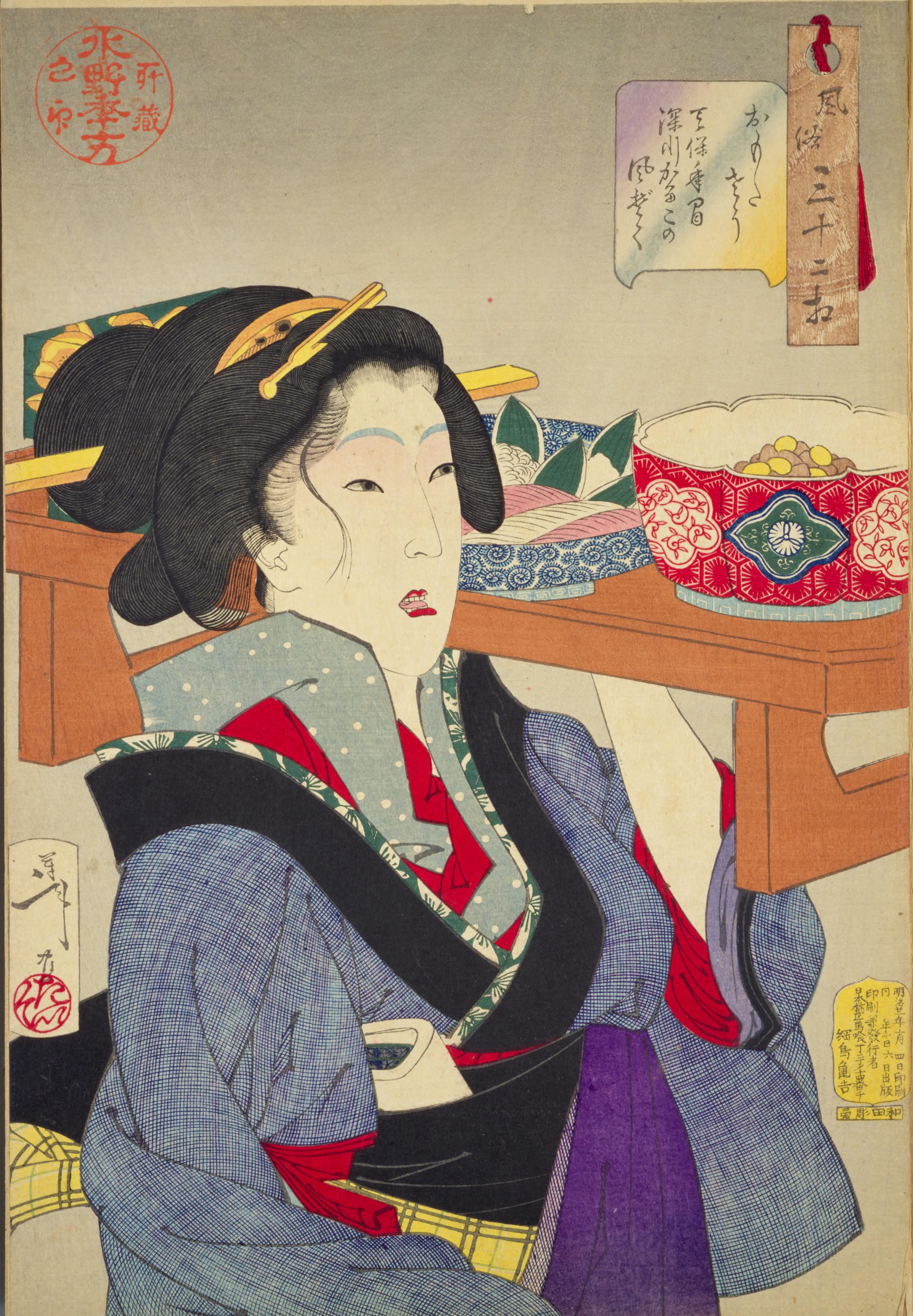
Heavy: Habits of a waitress in the licensed quarters at Fukagawa in the Tempō era

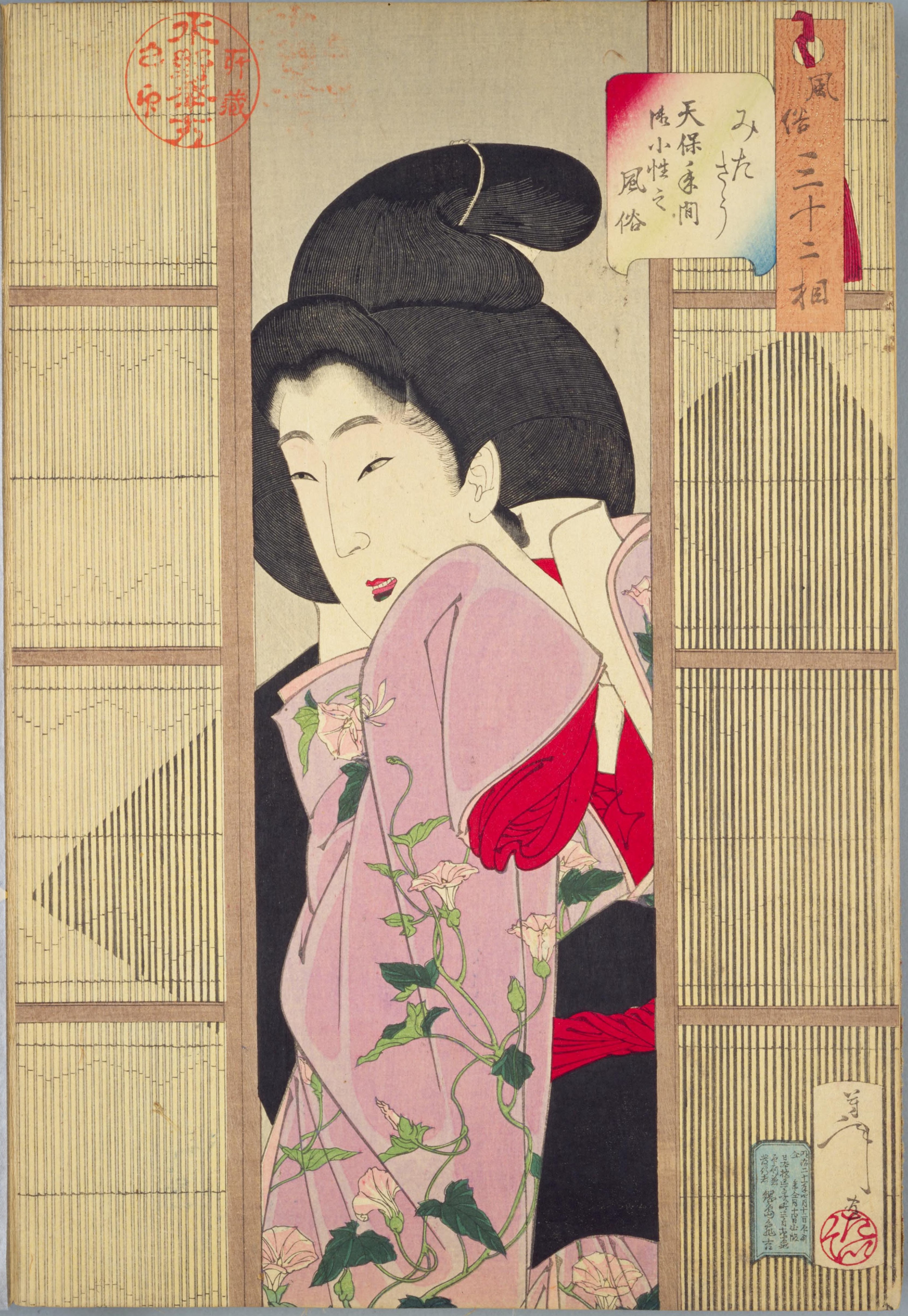
Curious: Habits of an okoshō (Note: Okoshō were maids typically from lower-class families who would live with samurai families to learn upper-class manners.) of the Tempō era

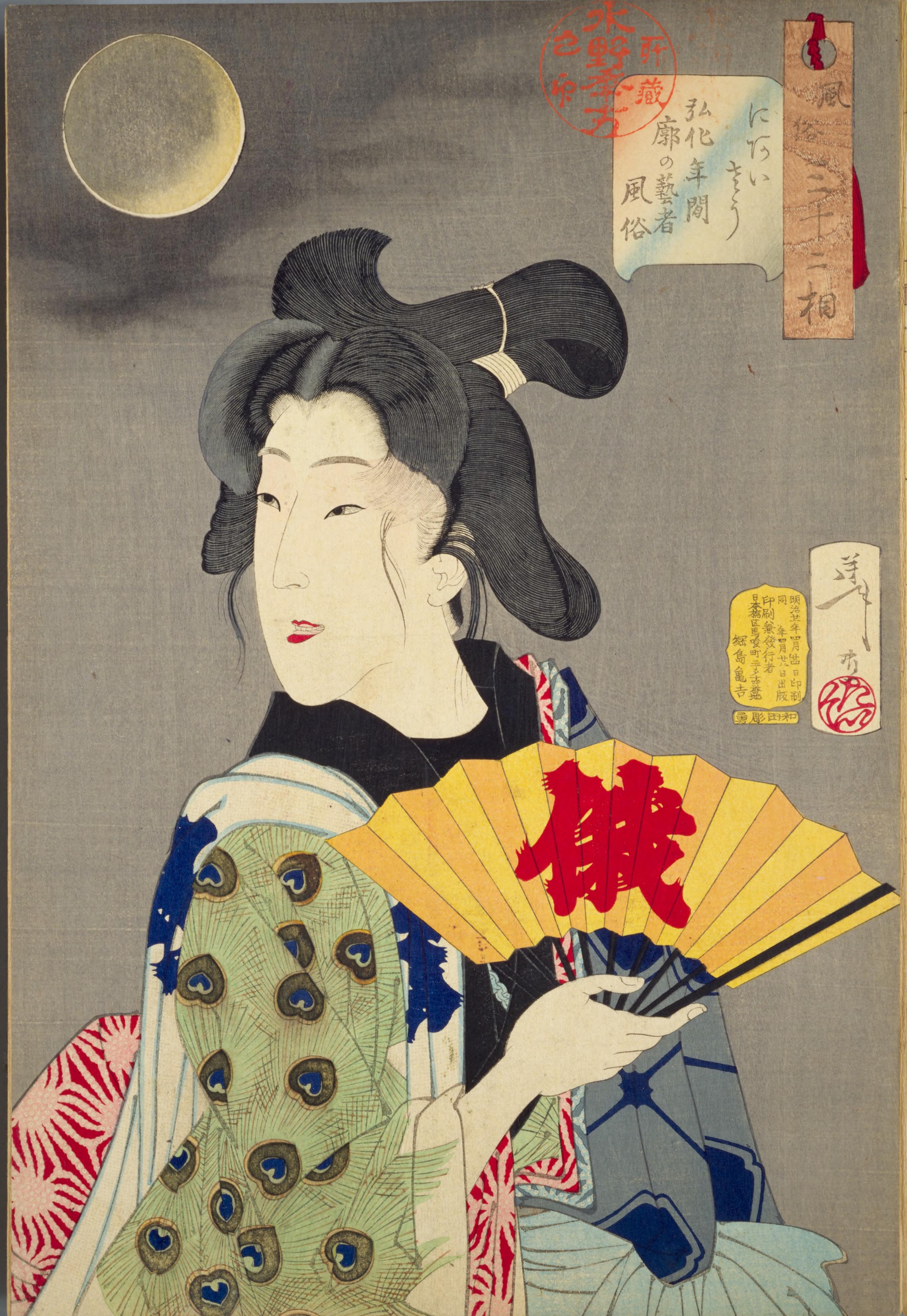
Suitable/Becoming: Habits of a geisha of the licensed quarters (Note: The "licensed quarters" likely refers to the Yoshiwara district of Tokyo, however many other cities at the time had similar districts.) in the Kōka era

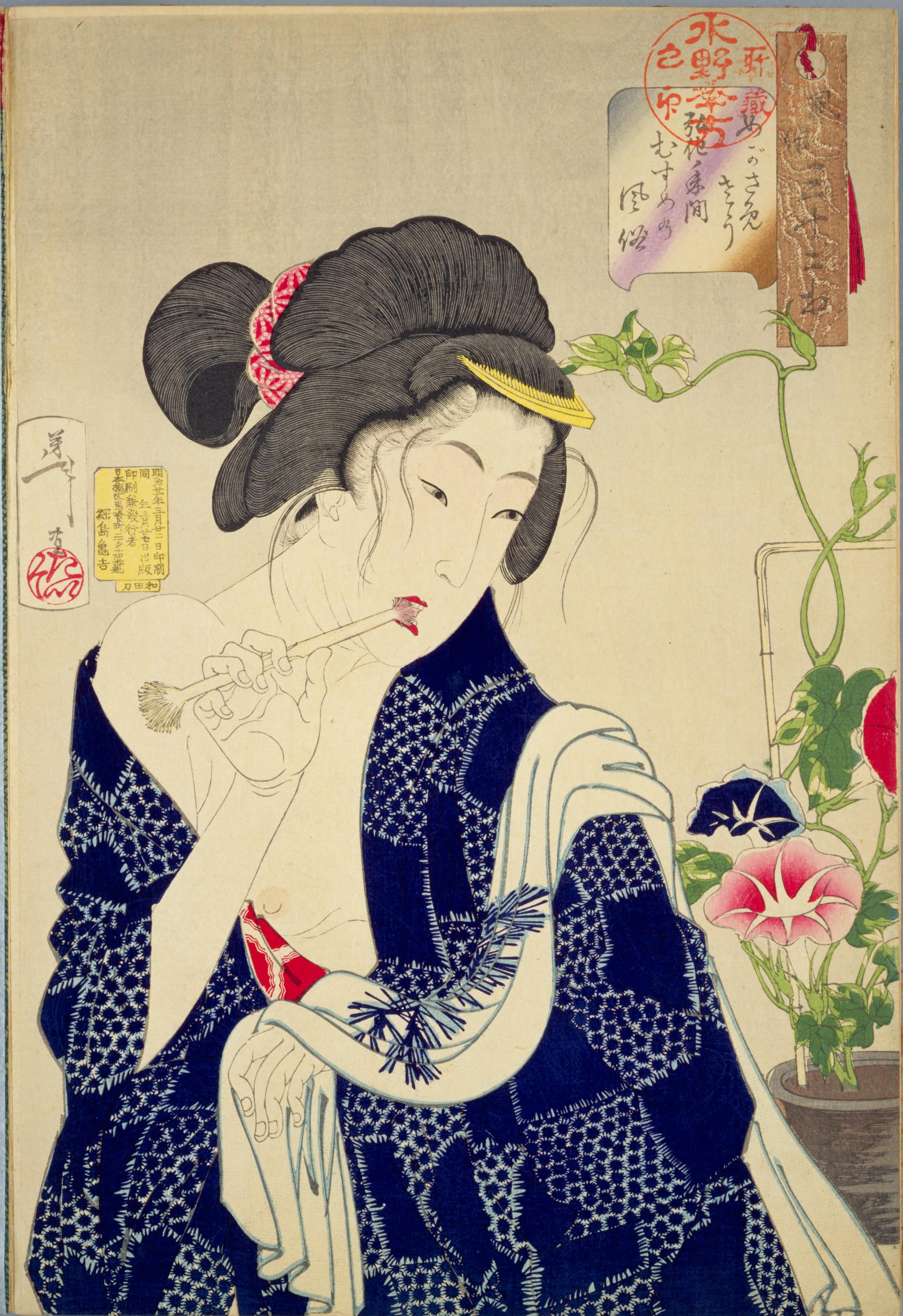
Awake: A young woman of the Kōka era

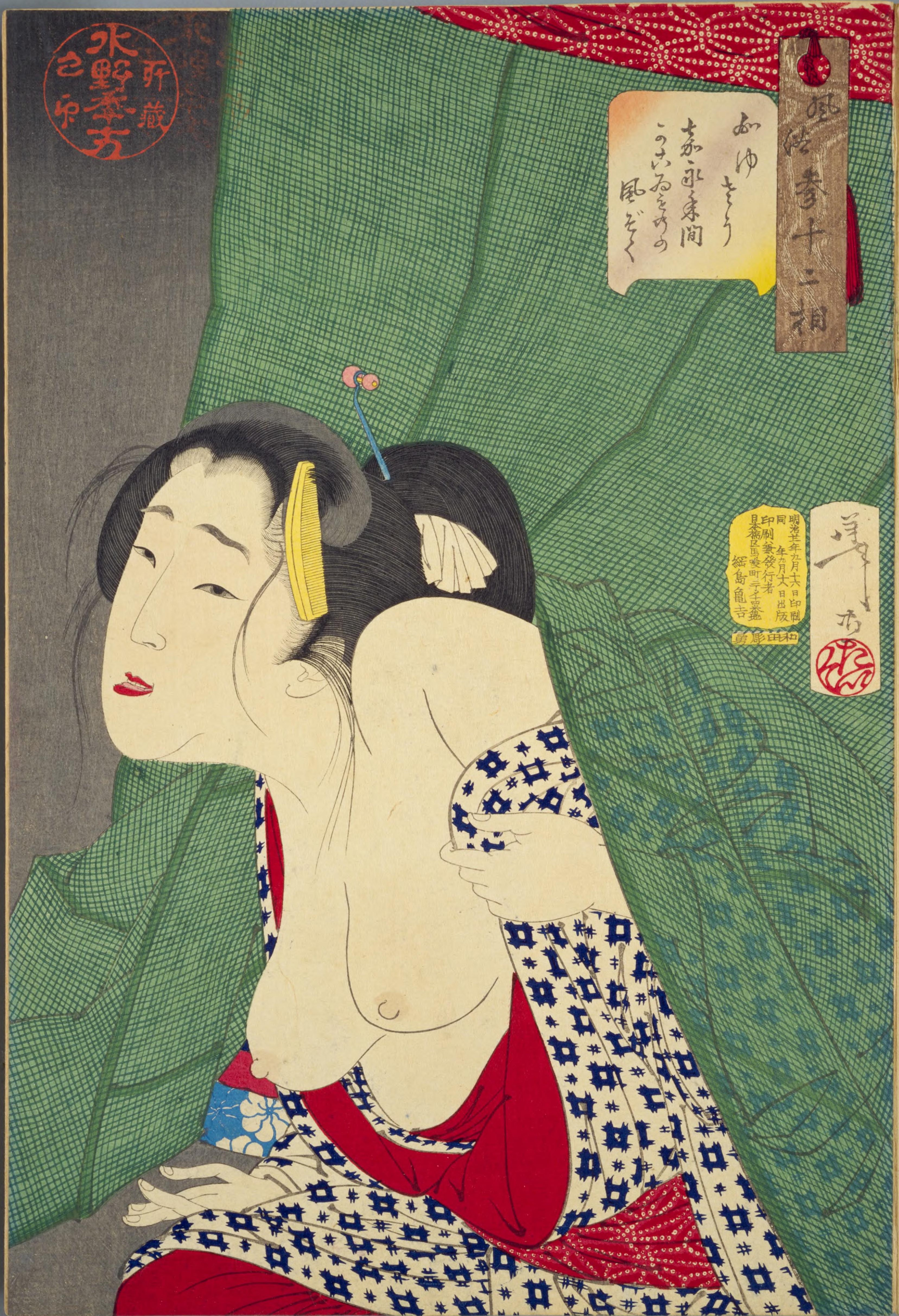
Itchy: Habits of a concubine of the Kaei era

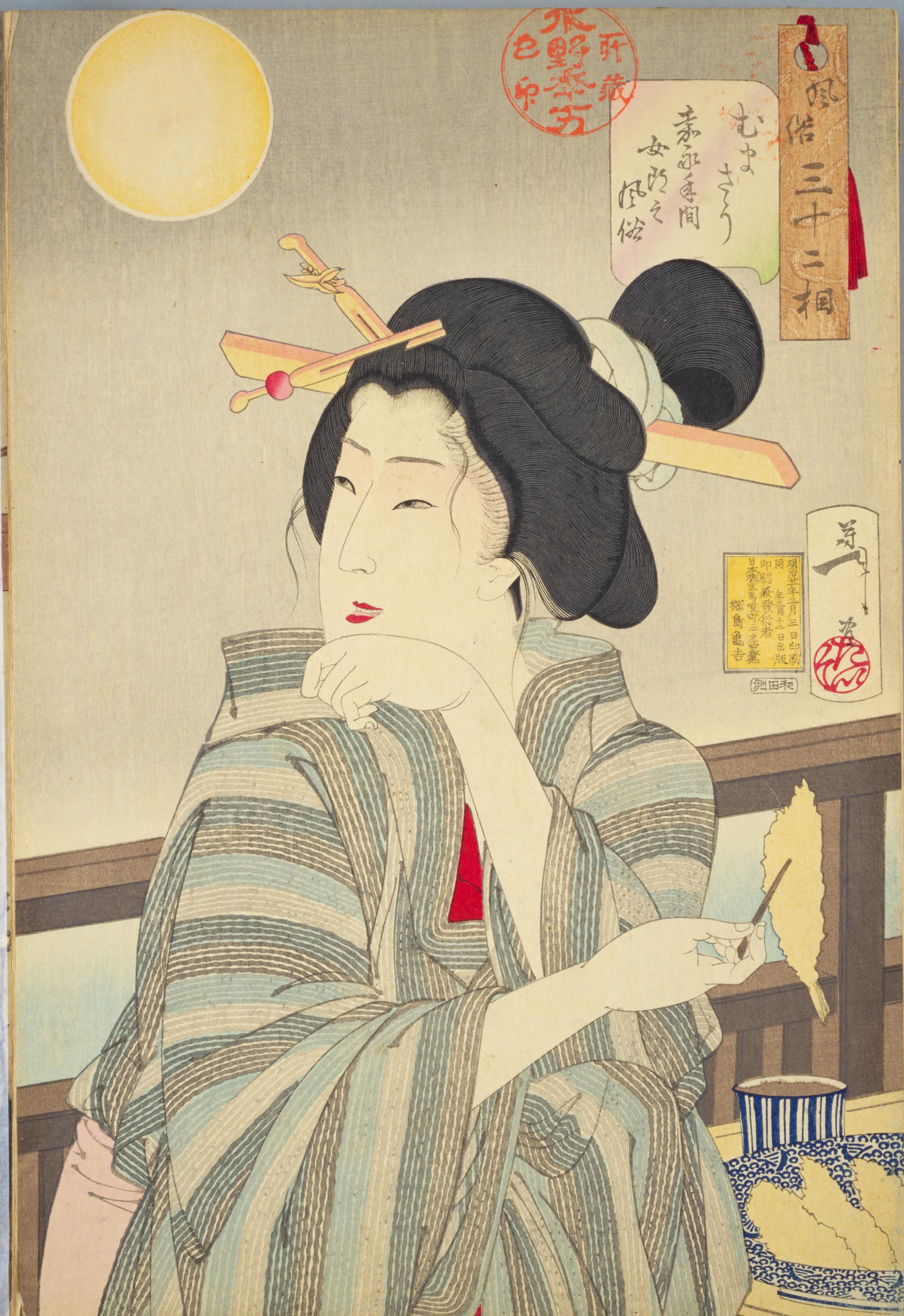
Delicious: Habits of a prostitute of the Kaei era.

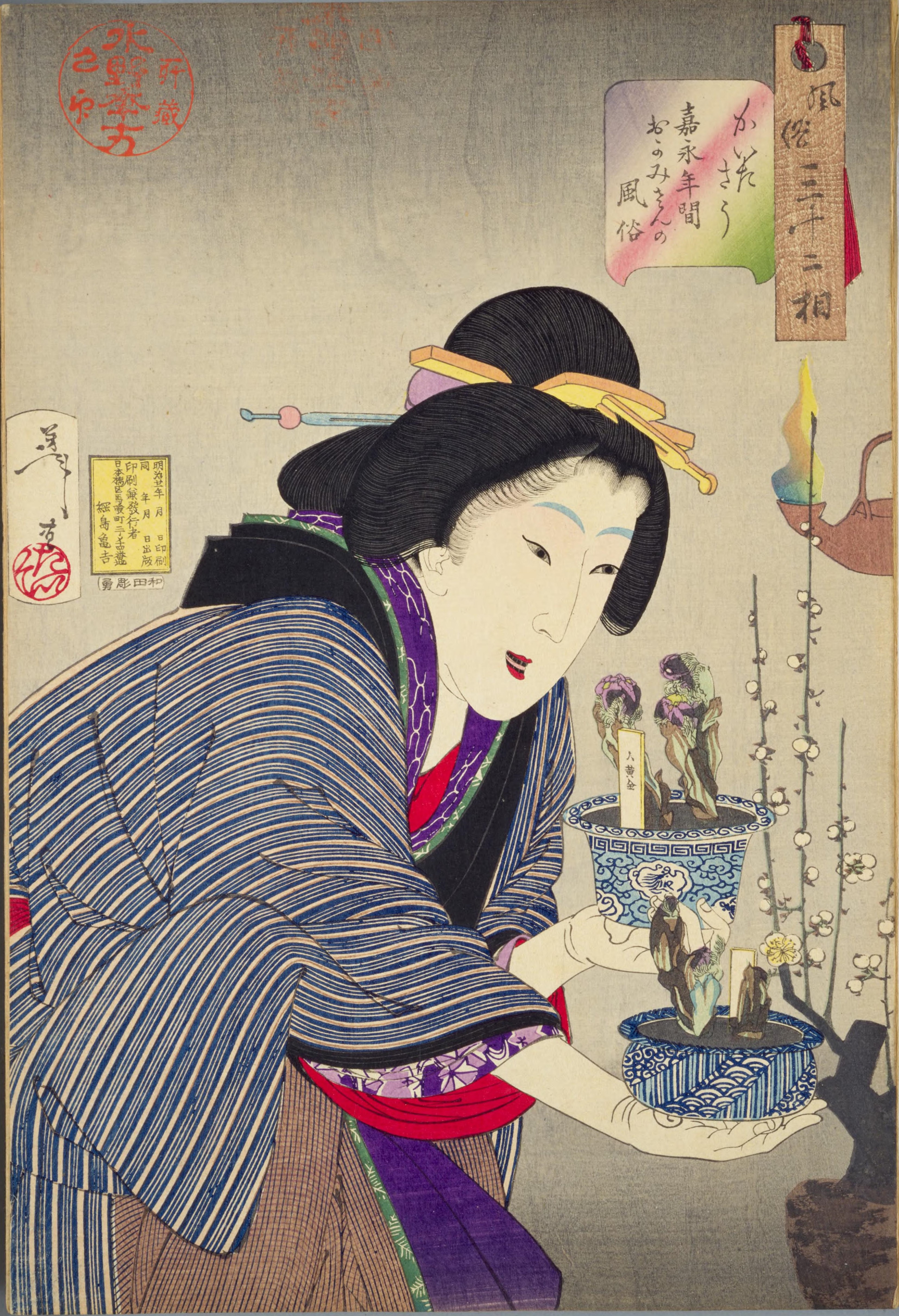
Undecided: Habits of a proprietress of the Kaei era

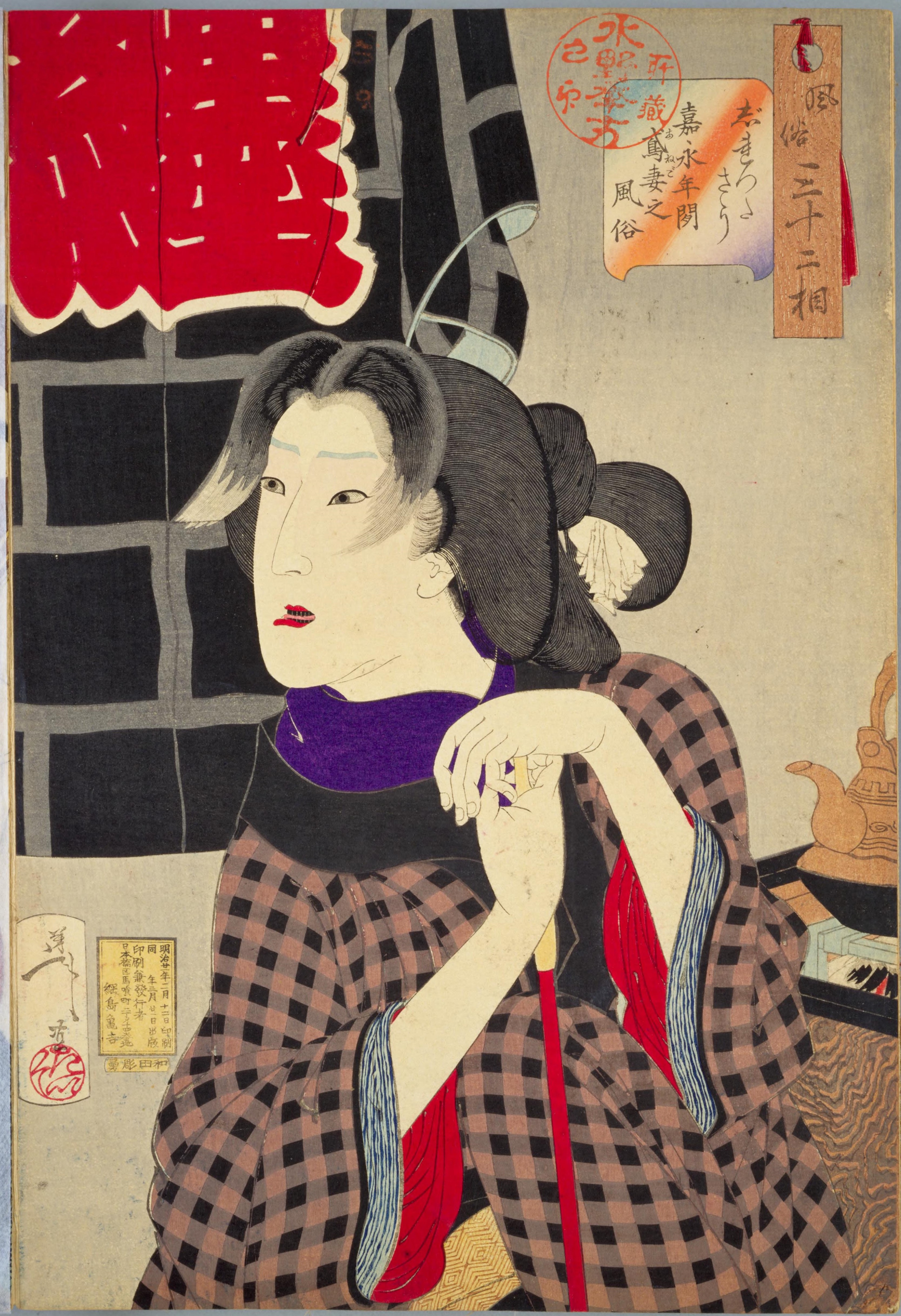
Expectant/Irritable: Habits of the wife of a fire chief in the Kaei era

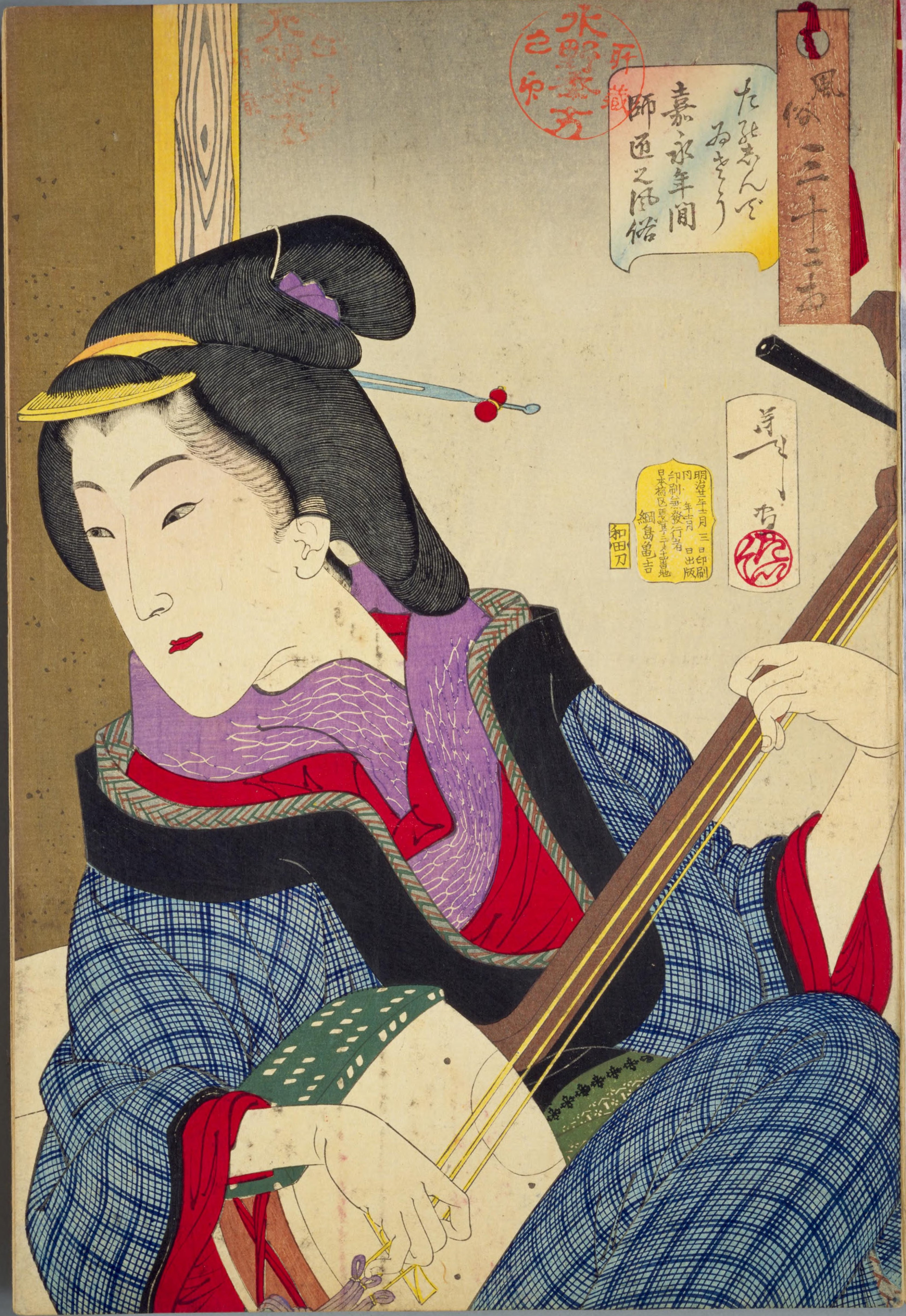
Enjoying: Habits of a teacher of the Kaei era

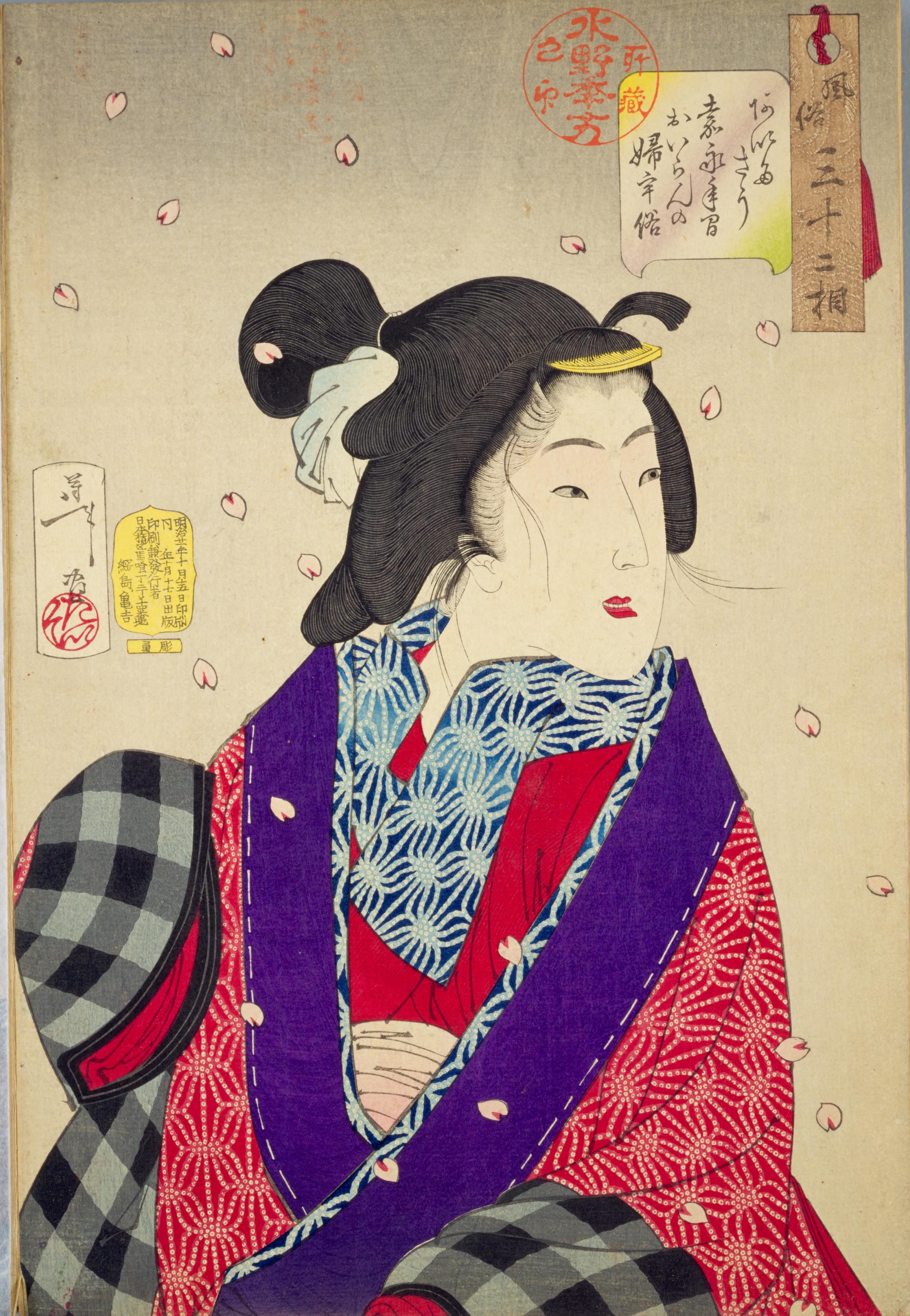
Eager: Habits of an oiran of the Kaei era

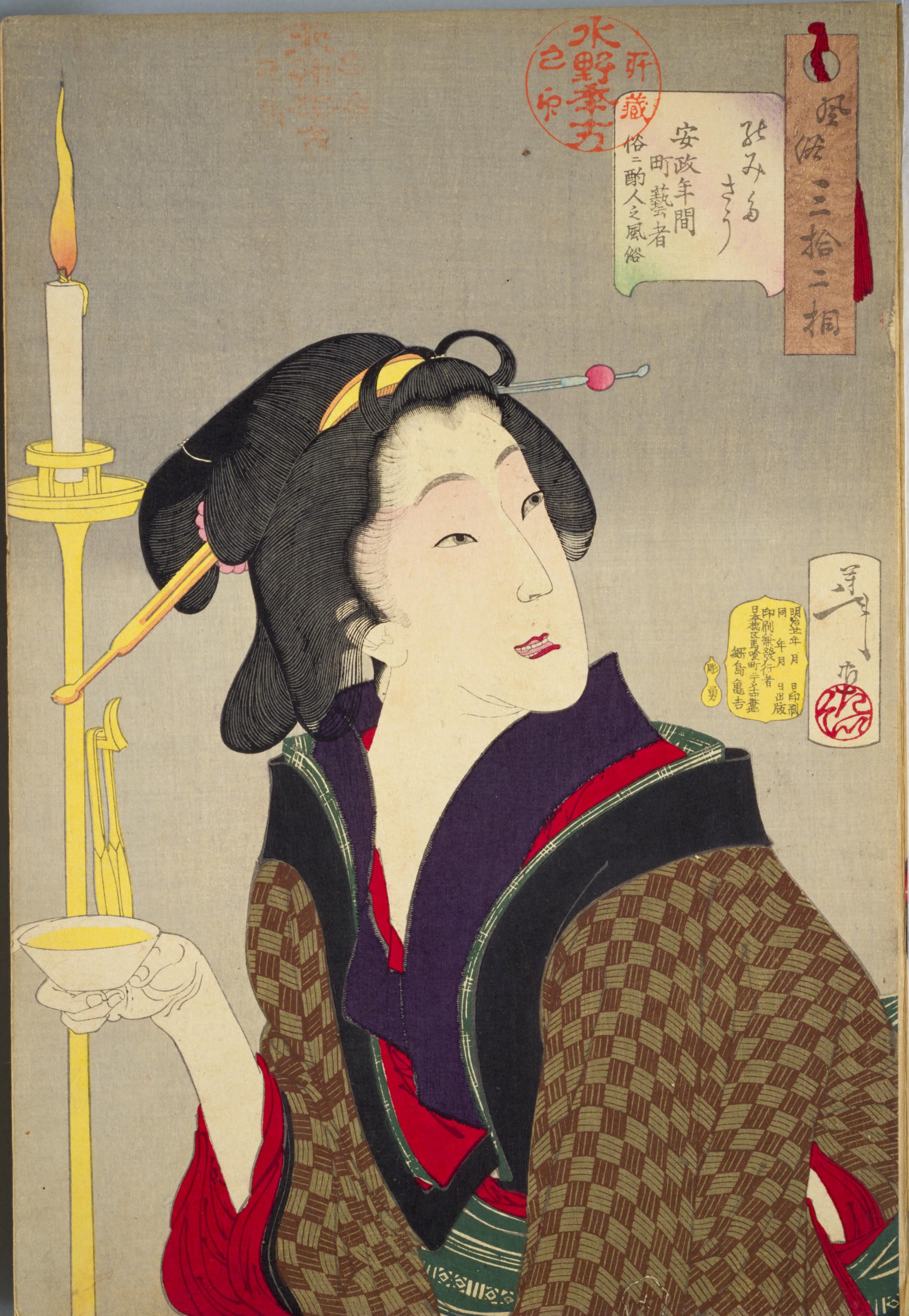
Thirsty: Habits of a street geisha, (Note: A machi geisha, literally translated as town geisha, worked outside of a yūkaku, areas of Japan where prostitution was legal.) a bar-girl, of the Ansei era

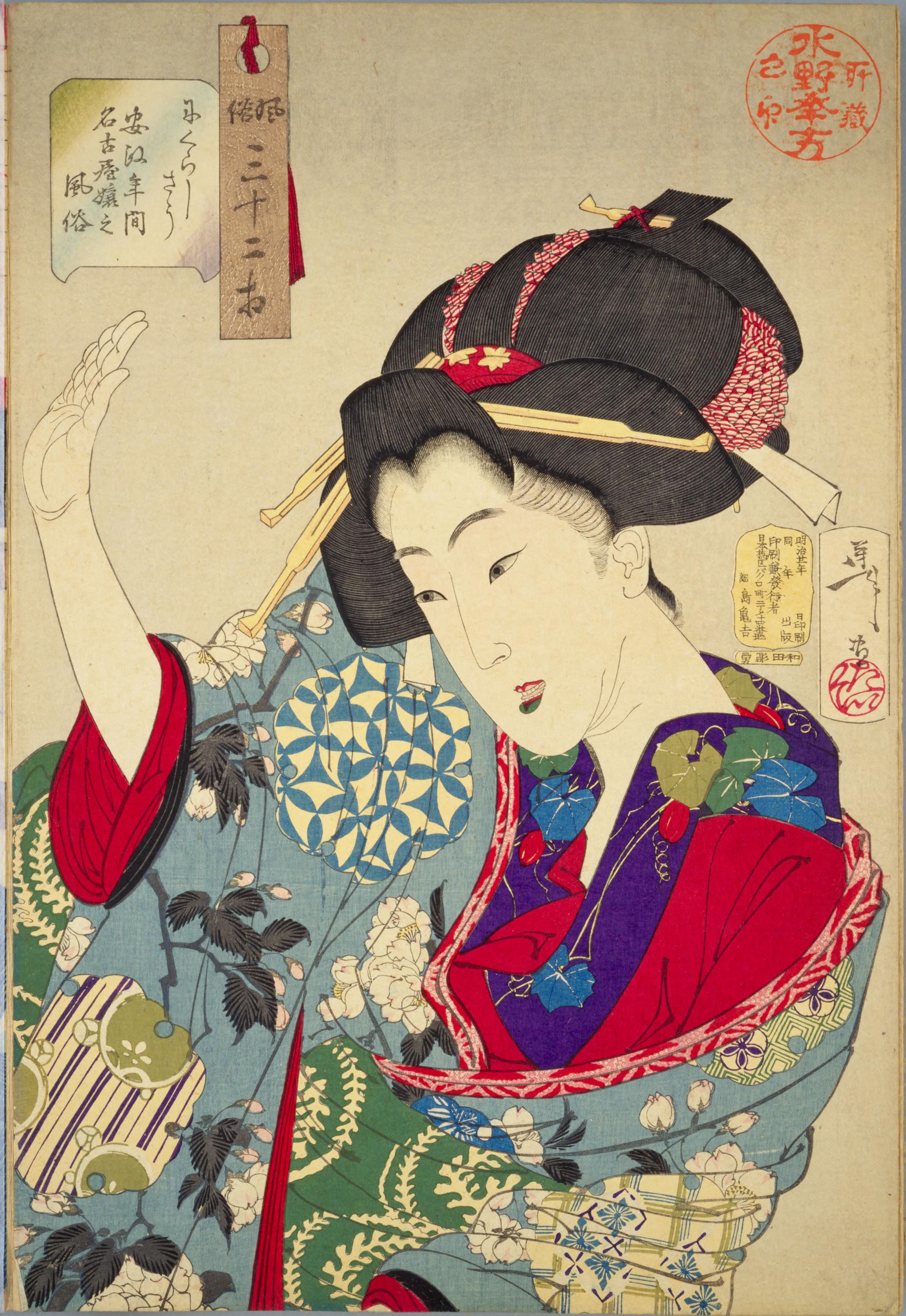
Disagreeable: Habits of a young woman of Nagoya in the Ansei era

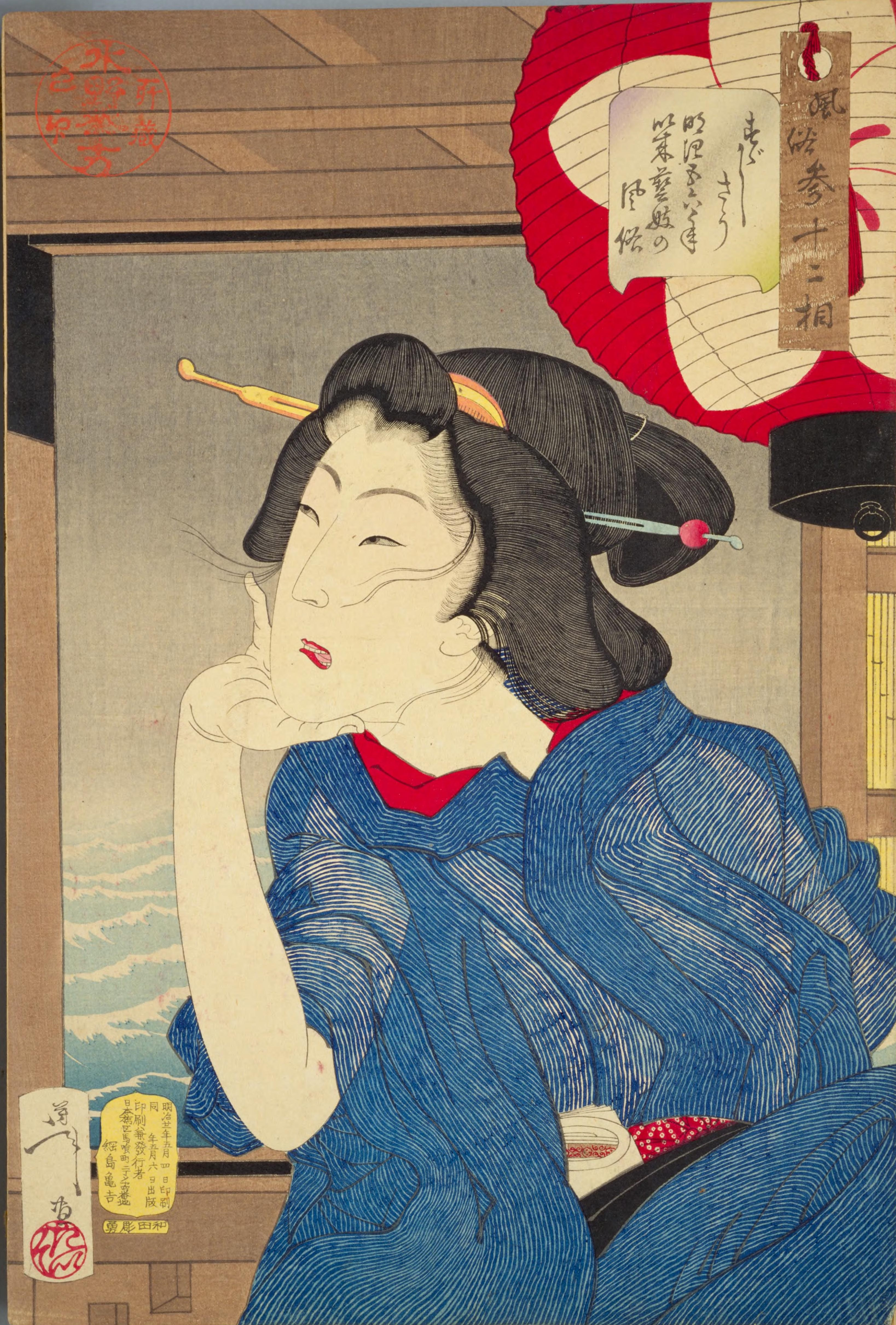
Cool: Habits of a geisha of the 5th or 6th year of the Meiji era

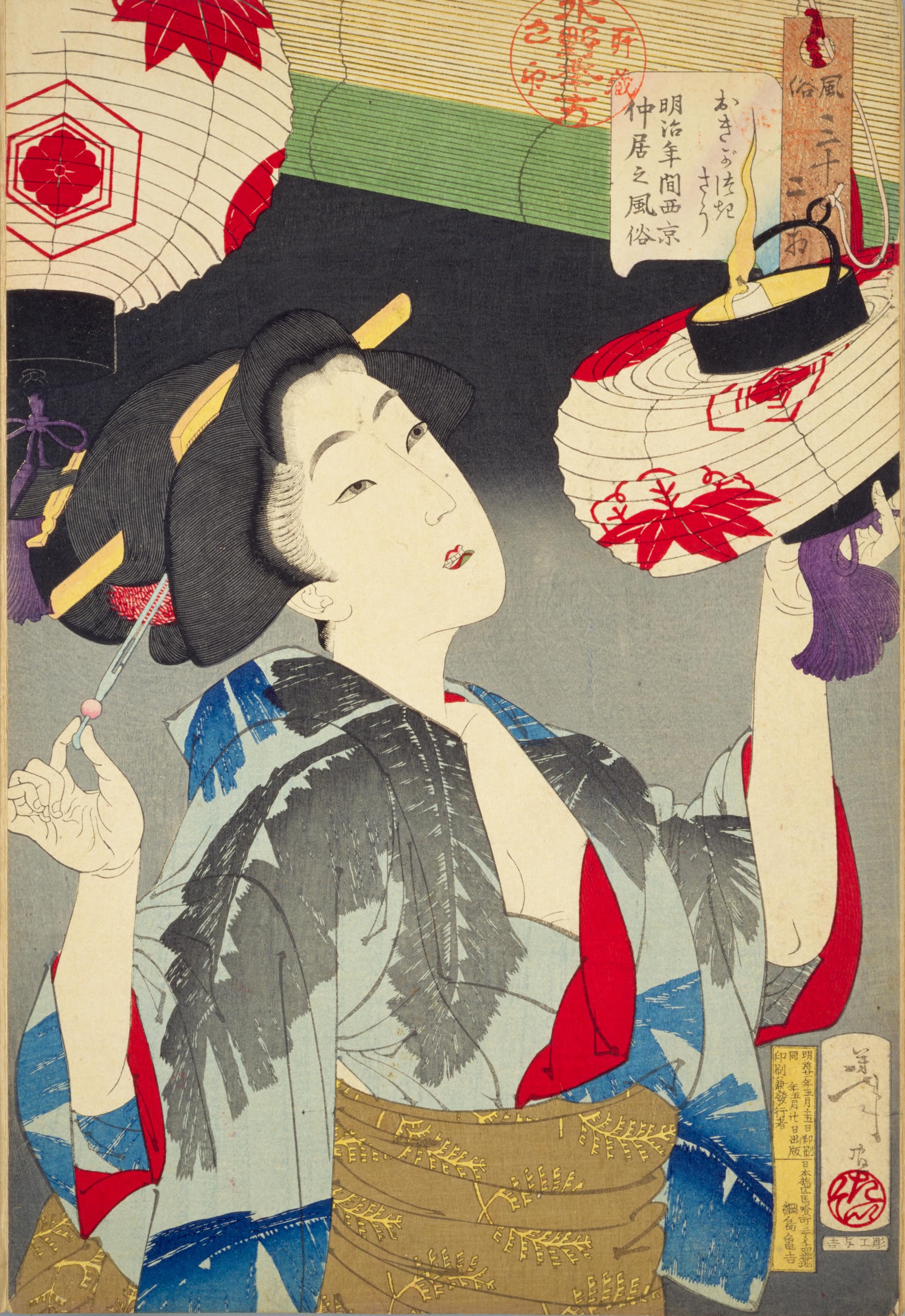
Observant: Habits of a waitress of Western Kyōto in the Meiji era

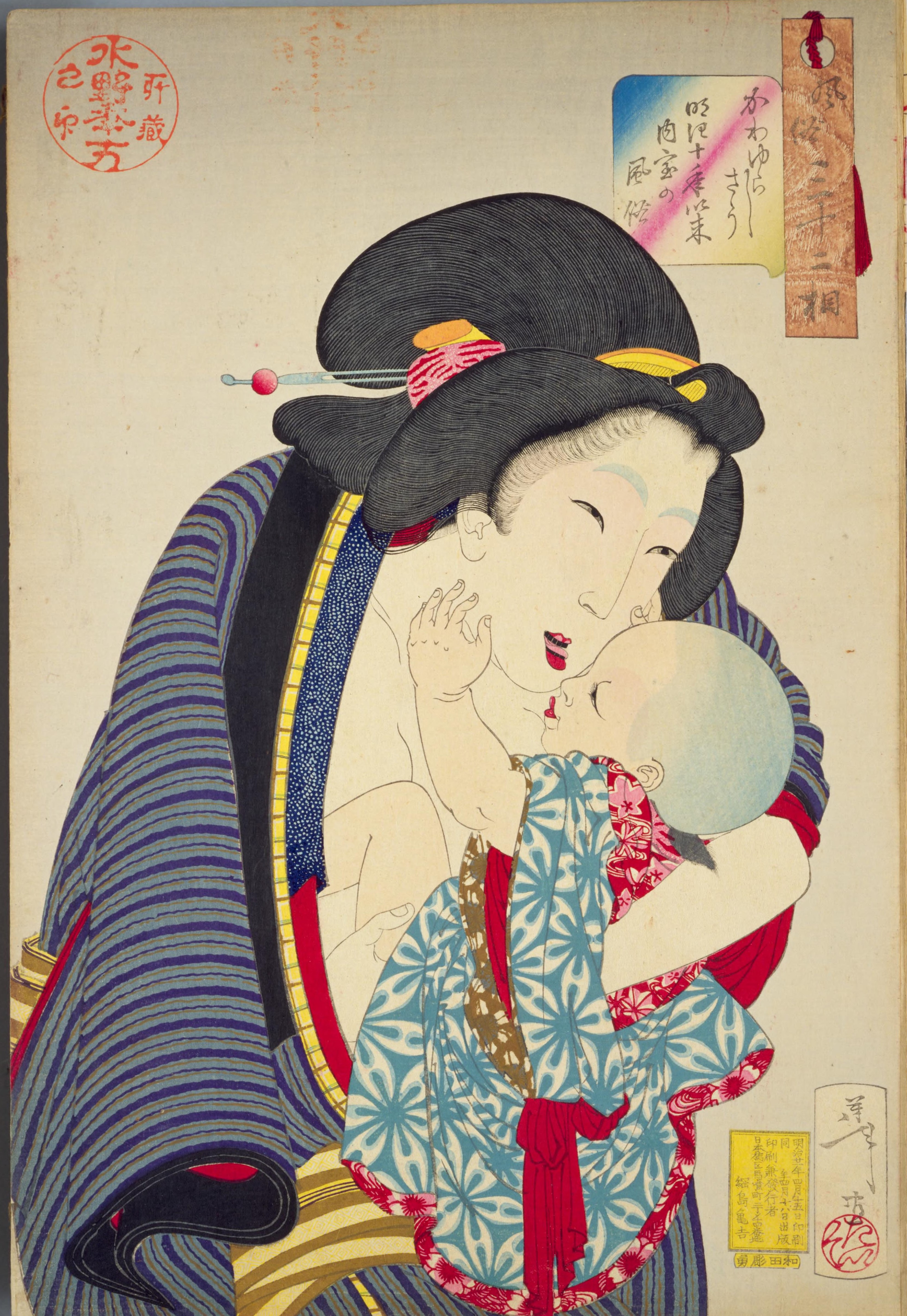
Cute: Habits of a housewife of the 10th year of the Meiji era

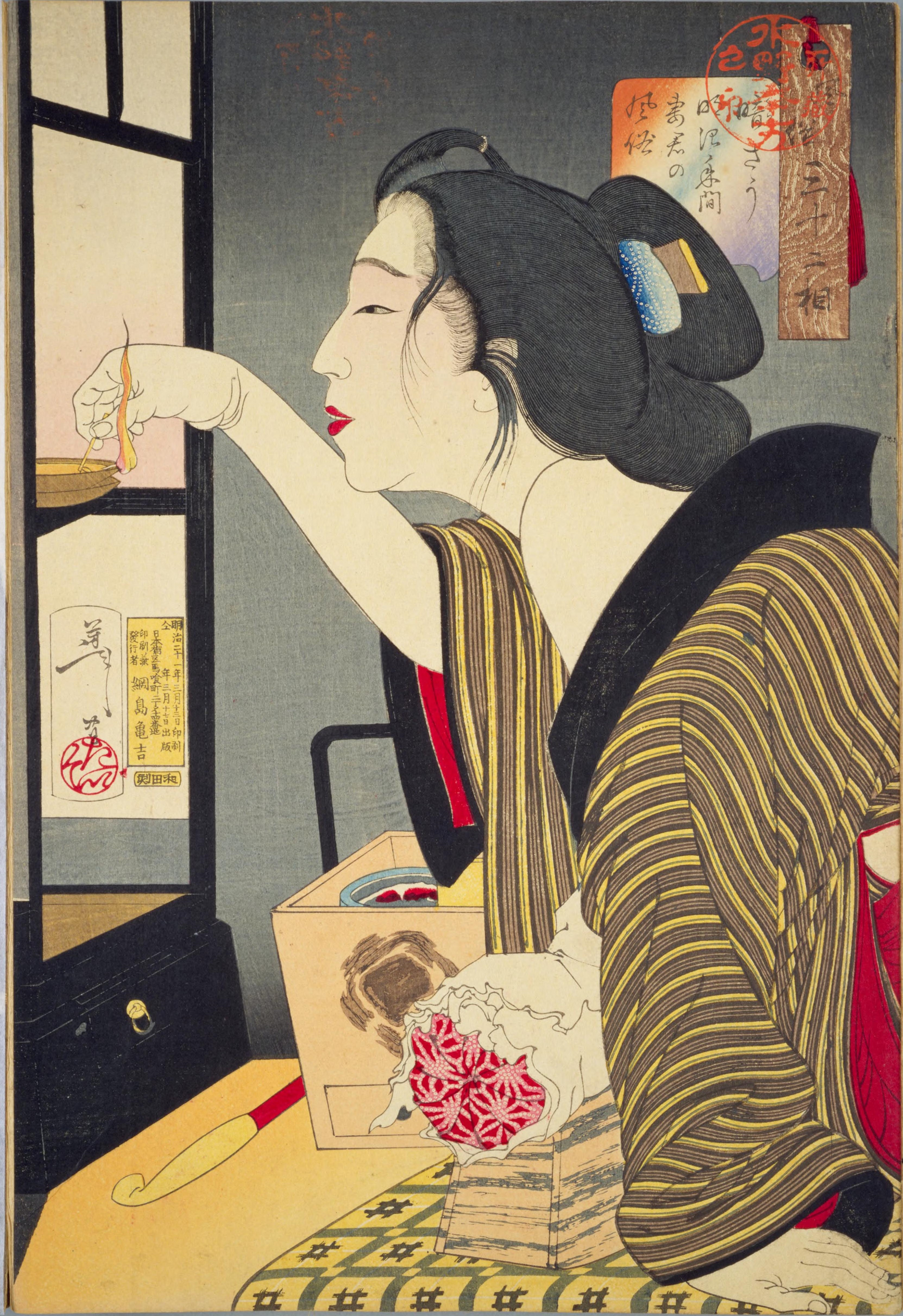
Dark: Habits of a housewife of the Meiji era

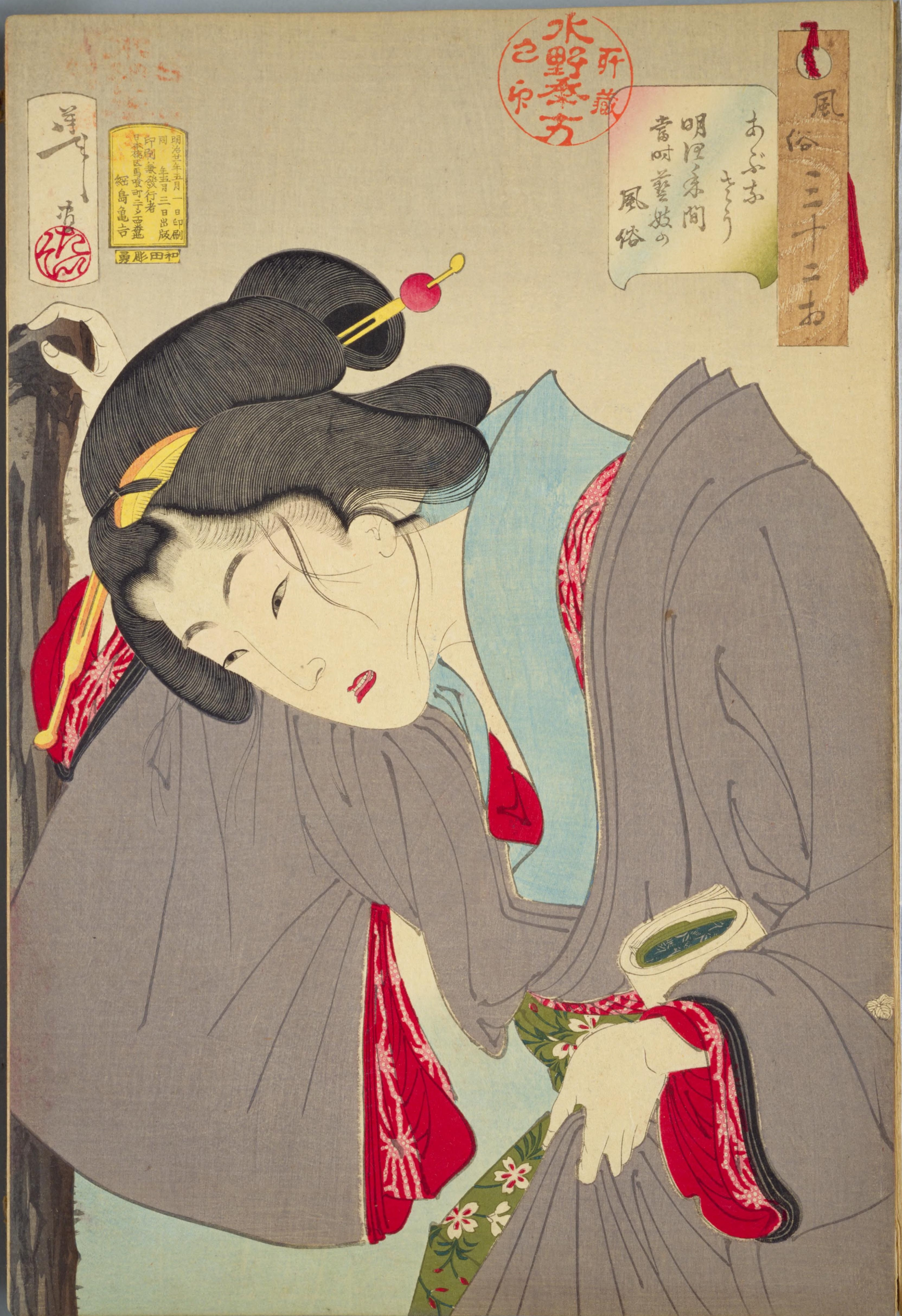
Dangerous: Habits of a modern geisha of the Meiji era

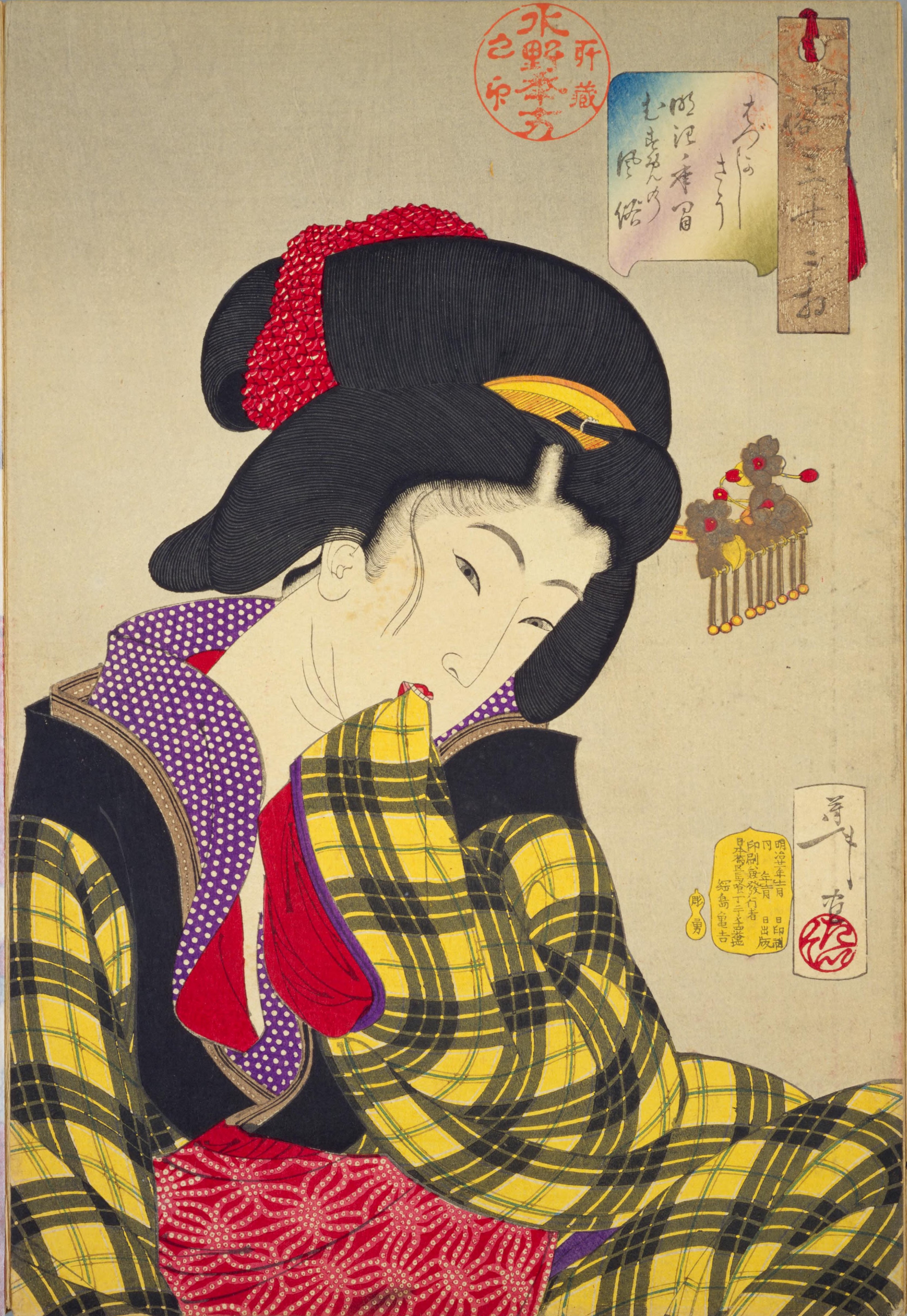
Embarrassed/Shy: Habits of a young woman of the Meiji era

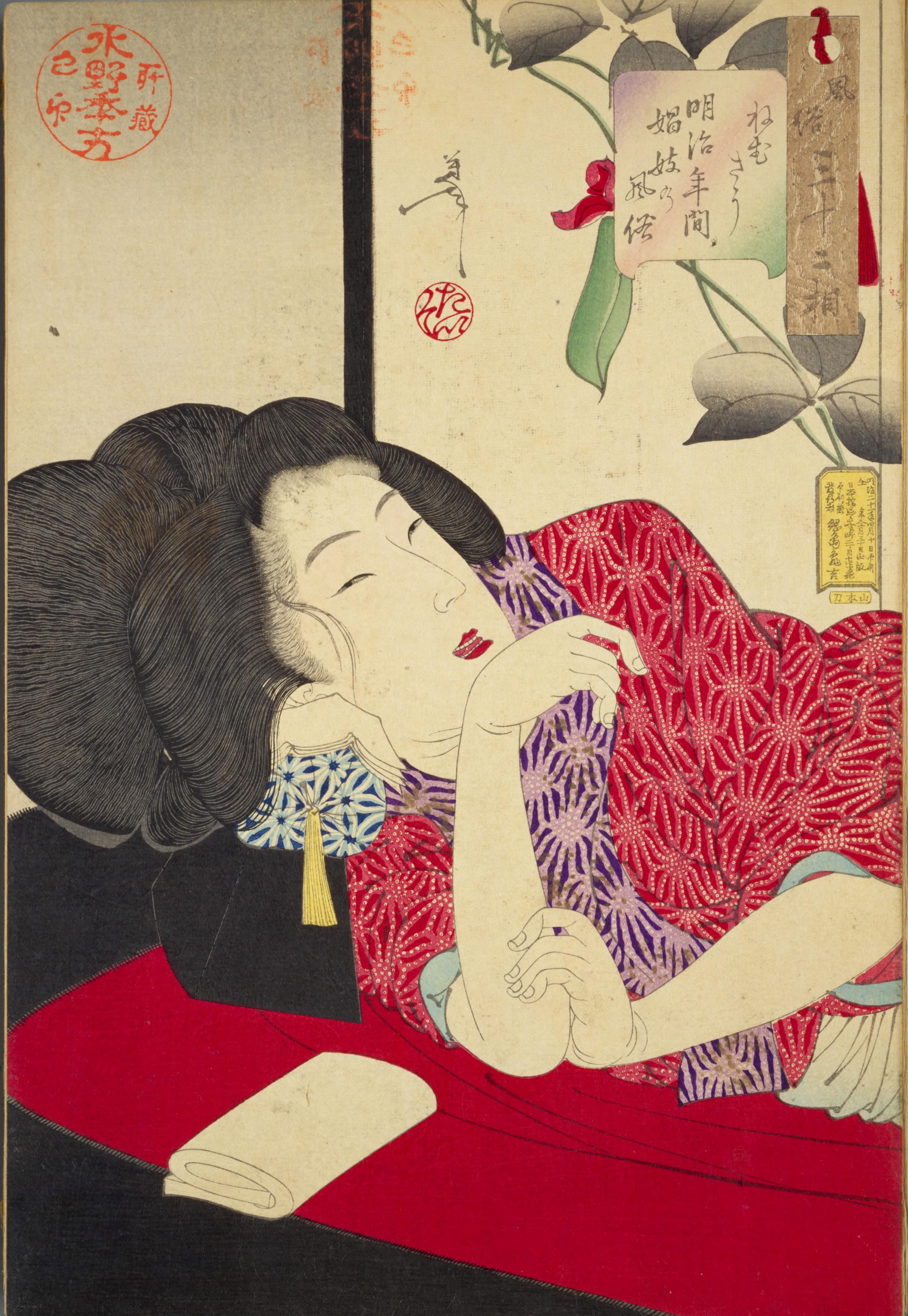
Sleepy: Habits of a prostitute of the Meiji era

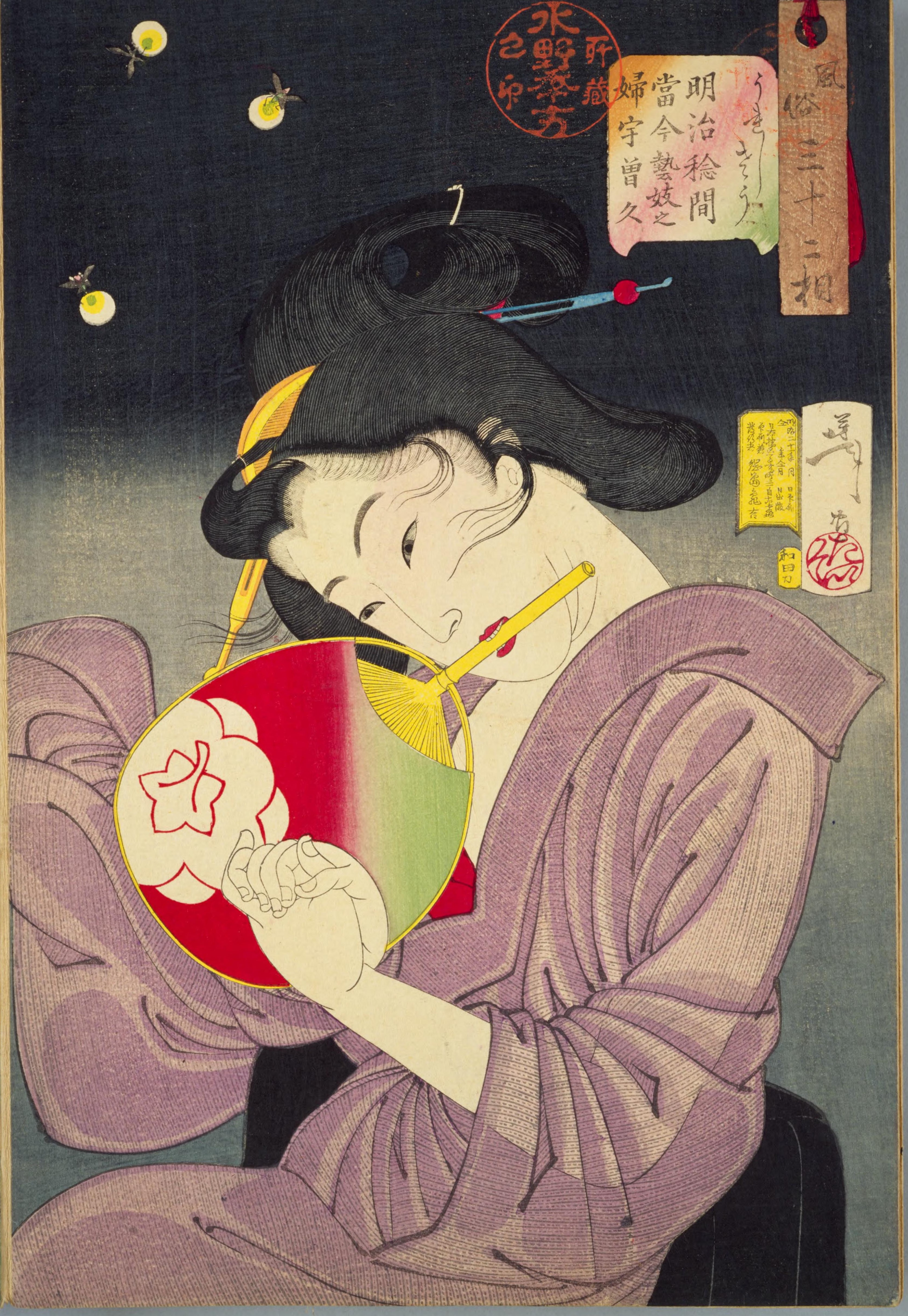
Happy: Habits of a modern geisha of the Meiji era

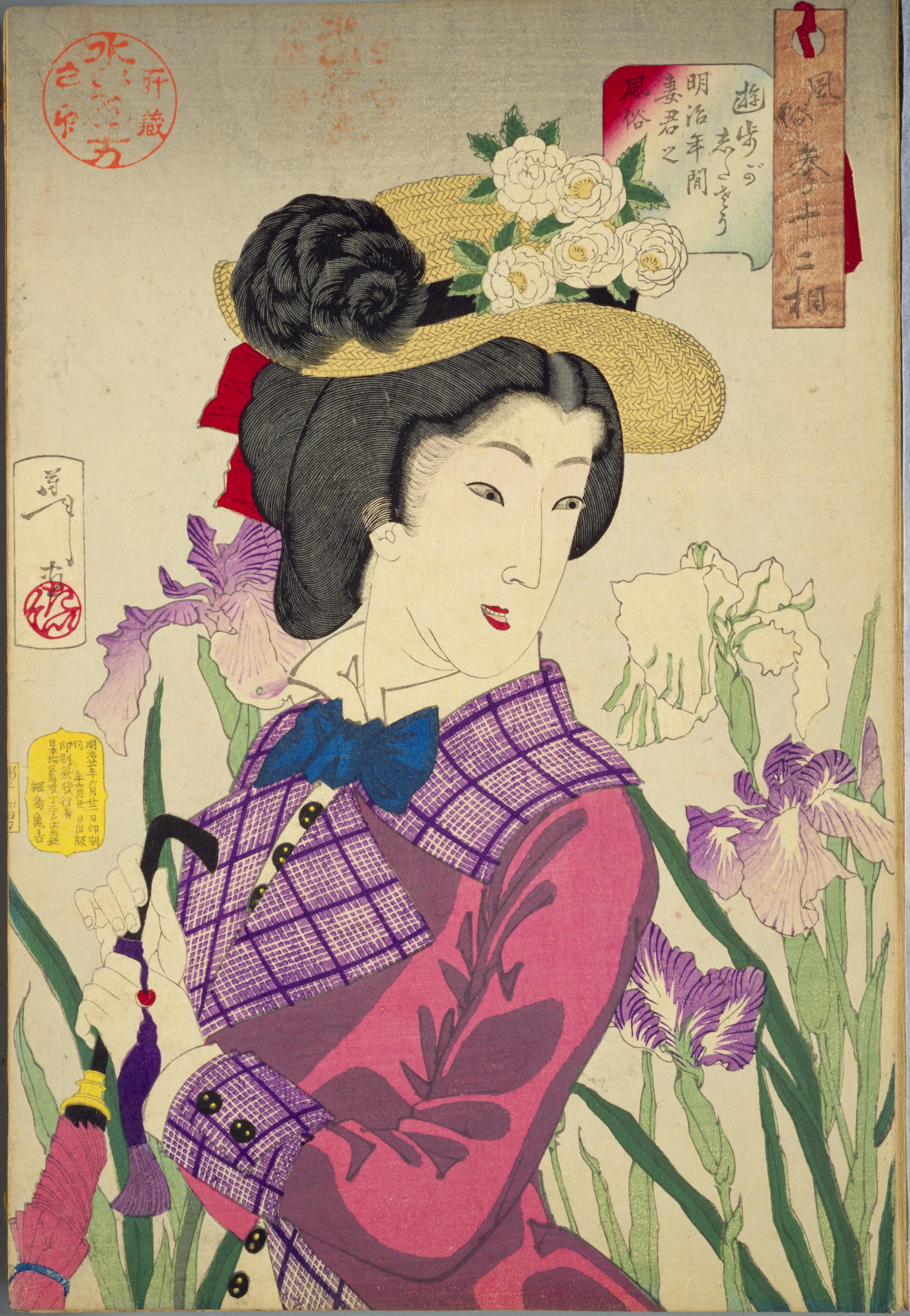
Strolling: Habits of the wife of a nobleman of the Meiji era
