= Charles Haynes =

Charles Haynes may refer to:

- Charles E. Haynes (1784–1841), American politician and physician
- Charles Lyman Haynes (1870–1947), American architect
- Charles Haynes (footballer) (1855–1935), British army officer and footballer
- Charles Haynes (mayor) (1838–1901), New Zealand local politician and mayor of Dunedin
- Charles Haynes (musician), American drummer, record producer, and musical director

== See also ==
- Charles Haines (disambiguation)
