= Lisa E. Harris =

American artist, opera singer, and composer

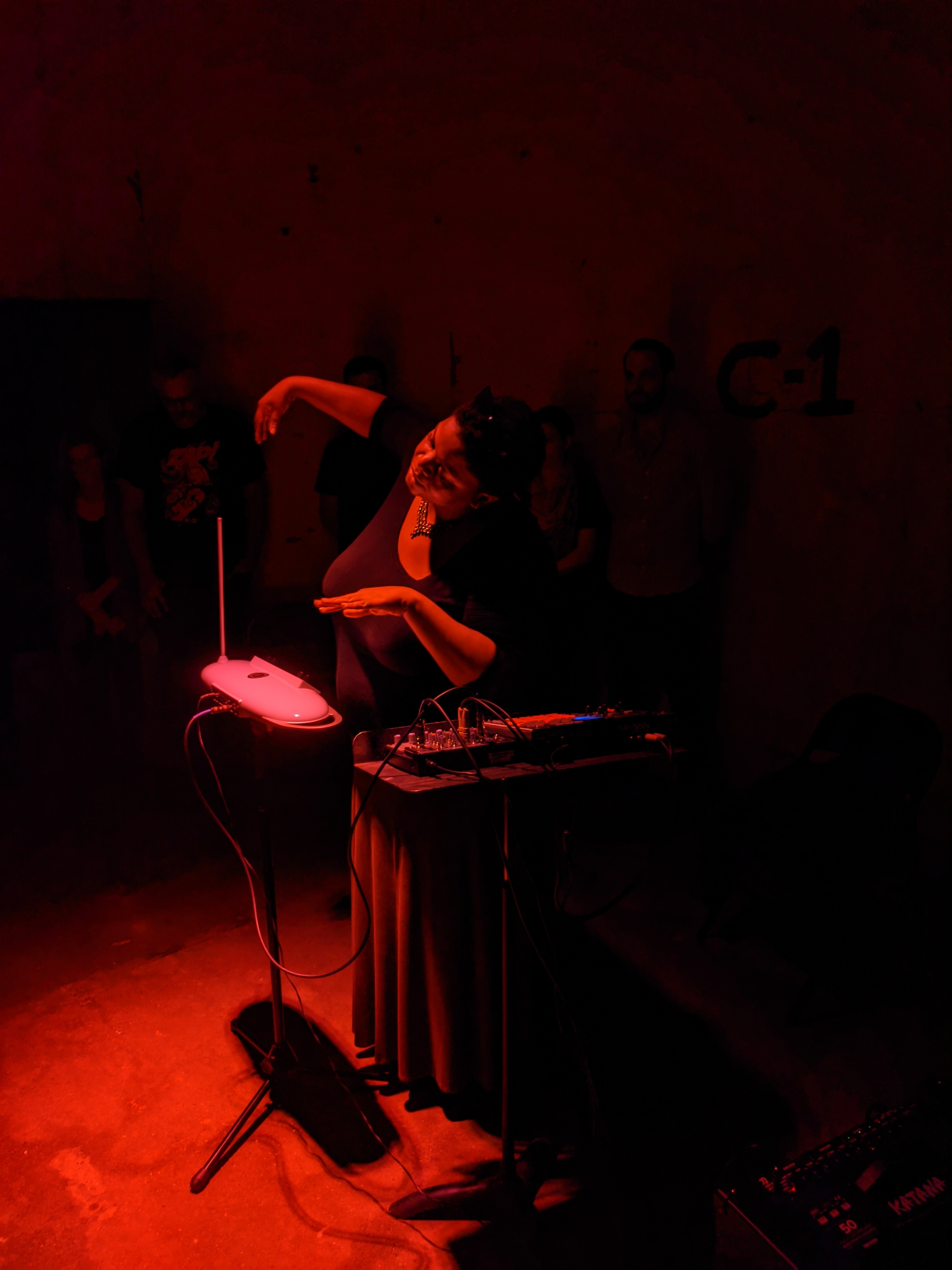
- Born: 1981 (age 44–45)
- Education: Kinder High School for the Performing and Visual Arts; Mannes College of Music; B.M. - Vocal Performance; Manhattan School of Music; M.M. - Vocal Performance
- Website: www.lisaeharris.com

Lisa E. Harris, (born 1981) also known as Li, is a multimedia artist, opera singer, and composer. She is renowned for her interdisciplinary work using voice, text, installation, movement, and new media.

== Early life and education ==
As a child, Harris participated in various performances at Epiphany Episcopal Church, as well as other regional theaters in the Houston area. She was part of a children's chorus with the Houston Grand Opera. She graduated from Houston’s Kinder High School for the Performing and Visual Arts in 1998 and went on to perform as a soloist at the Aspen Opera Theatre Center from 2001 to 2002. In 2002, she received her Bachelor of Music in Vocal Performance with a minor in Composition from the Mannes College of Music, and in 2004, received her Master of Music in Vocal Performance with a Minor in Piano from the Manhattan School of Music. Harris received her foundational classical vocal technique under the tutelage of Ruth Falcon at Mannes College of Music. Harris studied in the studio of Marlena Kleinman Malas from 2002-2004.

== Work ==
Trained as an opera singer, Harris is an interdisciplinary artist working in music, performance and installation and video. She was on the Humphrey's School of Musical Theatre's voice faculty. Harris’ work revolves around various themes such as African-American motherhood, gentrification and notions of abduction and survival. Genres that she pulls from in her work include science fiction and magical realism. She has also worked collaboratively most often working with other performance artists including Alisha Wormsley, Autumn Knight, Rashida Bumbray, Nicole Mitchell, and Abijan Johnson, on projects. Harris, along with Wormsley, is co-founder of Studio Enertia, an artist collective presenting works in sculpture, installations, film, photography, performance and new opera.

== Career ==
Harris is a filmmaker, librettist and composer who created Cry of the Third Eye - a new opera film in Three Acts. She has screened installations of this work and the completed work with Aurora Picture Show and the Houston Public Library. The world premiere of The Last Resort, act Three of Cry of the Third Eye- a new opera film in Three Acts by Harris, was premiered at Houston Cinema Arts Festival in 2019.

The Last Resort by Li Harris was on virtual exhibition at Washington Project for the Arts in 2020, as a part of the exhibition Black Women as/and the Living Archive, curated by Tsedaye Makonnen.

In 2018, Harris performed with her theremin at Red Bull Music Presents: Round Robin in Chicago alongside numerous classical, jazz, hip hop, and electronic musicians. In 2019, she performed live performance of voice and theremin at Moogfest and at Ballroom Marfa’s Festival, Marfa Myths in Marfa, Texas.

Harris has worked with filmmakers Ashley Hunt, Cauleen Smith, Alisha Wormsley, Raymond Pirtle, and Ennest Waddell.

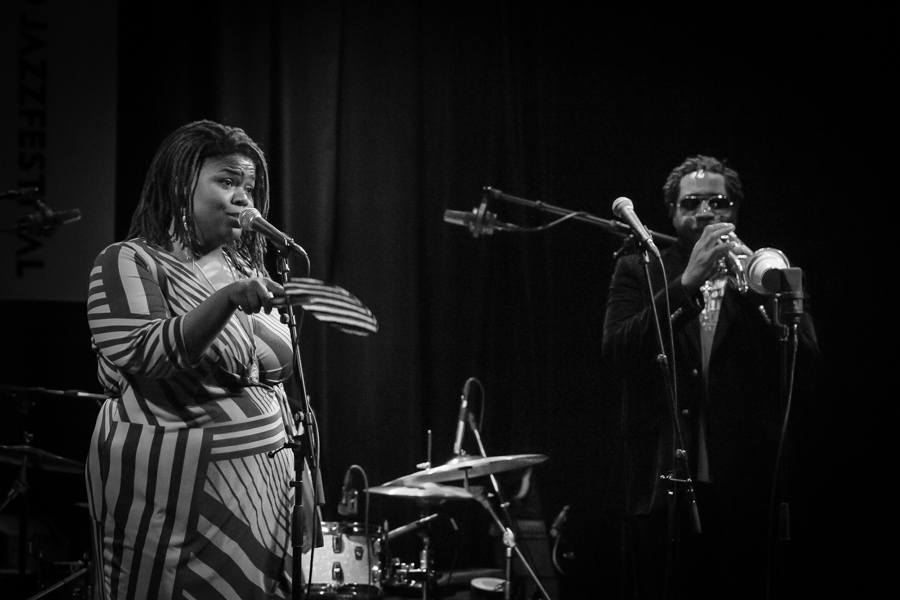
Lisa E. Harris and Leron Thomas with Jason Moran - Fats Waller Dance Party at Victoria Scene during the Oslo Jazzfestival 2015.

Harris can be seen as the lead singer of Jason Moran’s Fats Waller Dance Party. Notable live performances with the Fats Waller Dance party include the Newport Jazz Festival’s Fort Stage, Monterey Jazz Festival, Montreux Jazz Festival, Chicago Jazz Festival, Sarejevo Jazz Festival, Nice Jazz Festival, International Festival of Jazz Montreal, Spoleto Jazz Festival, and the Playboy Jazz Festival.

Harris is a featured vocalist on the album All Rise: A Joyful Elegy to Fats Waller by Jason Moran, produced by Meshell N’degeocello and Don Was, on Blue Note Records.

Harris performs as Orkney Woman and six other additional characters in the world premiere of The Nubian Word for Flowers- a phantom opera written by Pauline Oliveros and Ione. This world premiere took place at Roulette Intermedium in Brooklyn, New York and was produced by the International Contemporary Ensemble.

Harris and her production company Studio Enertia, petitioned for the City of Houston to proclaim May 30, 2019 as Pauline Oliveros Day. To commemorate the occasion, Harris produced the inaugural Pauline Oliveros Day on May 25, 2019 at Discovery Green, Houston.

== Fellowships and awards ==
- Guggenheim Fellowship, 2022
- Houston Regional Affiliated Fellowship - American Academy in Rome, 2021-2022
- Dorothea Tanning Award for Music/Sound - Foundation for Contemporary Arts, 2021
- Texas Vignette Artist Grant, 2021
- Monroe Fellowship Research Grant, New Orleans Center for the Gulf South at Tulane University
- ABGMA Contemporary 2022 Award

== Discography ==
- Jason Moran, All Rise: A Joyful Elegy for Fats Waller (Blue Note, 2014)
- Lisa E. Harris, Cry of the Third Eye - Original Soundtrack (Studio Enertia, 2015)
- Lisa E. Harris and Nicole Mitchell, EarthSeed (FPE, 2020)
- Lisa E. Harris, LIFE AND THAT (Studio Enertia, 2021)
