= Modernistic =

Modernistic may refer to:

- Modernistic (style), a British name of Art Deco
- Modernistic (album), an album by Jason Moran
