= Tarus Mateen =

American jazz musician

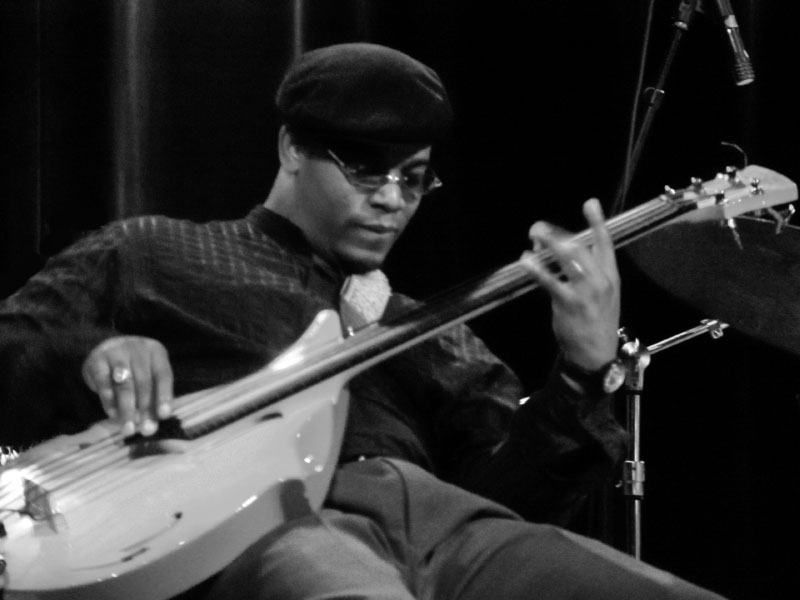
Tarus Mateen (Denmark 2015) Aarhus Jazz Festival

Tarus Mateen, also known as Taurus Mateen and Tarus Dorsey Kinch (born October 21, 1967, Bakersfield, California) is an American double-bass and electric bassist, who works in jazz, pop, and R&B idioms.

== Biography ==
Mateen was a child prodigy on bass and went on a tour of the Caribbean when he was twelve years old. He received his bachelor's degree from Morehouse College, where he also played on the side, then relocated to New York City in 1988. He worked with Betty Carter, Marlon Jordan, Roy Hargrove, Eddie Harris, Kenny Burrell, Milt Jackson, Mark Whitfield, Tim Warfield, Rodney Kendrick, and Terence Blanchard in the early 1990s. Later in the decade he worked with Kenny Barron, Bobbi Humphrey, Marc Cary, Stefon Harris, and Greg Osby. In the 2000s he worked with Bernard Purdie, Nasheet Waits, Stanley Cowell, Mark Shim, Jacky Terrasson, Michael Marcus, Logan Richardson, and Jason Moran among others.

Mateen has also worked as a session musician and touring bassist for pop, soul, and R&B artists, including Christina Aguilera, OutKast, Toni Braxton, Goodie Mob, Q-Tip, Lauryn Hill, Ghostface Killah, Ice Cube, and The Roots.

== Discography ==
With Jason Moran

- Facing Left (Blue Note, 2000)
- Black Stars (Blue Note, 2001)
- The Bandwagon (Blue Note, 2003)
- Same Mother (Blue Note, 2005)
- Artist in Residence (Blue Note, 2006)
- Ten (Blue Note, 2010)
- All Rise: A Joyful Elegy for Fats Waller (Blue Note, 2014)

With others

- Betty Carter, Droppin' Things (Verve, 1990)
- Terence Blanchard, The Malcolm X Jazz Suite (Columbia, 1993)
- Tim Warfield, A Cool Blue (Criss Cross Jazz, 1995)
- Tim Warfield, A Whisper In the Midnight (Criss Cross Jazz, 1996)
- Johnny O'Neal, On the Montreal Scene (Justin Time, 1996)
- Tim Warfield, Gentle Warrior (Criss Cross Jazz, 1998)
- Stanley Cowell, Dancers in Love (Venus, 2000)
- Marc Cary, Trillium (Jazzateria, 2000)
- Jacky Terrasson, Kindred (Blue Note, 2001)
- Tim Warfield, Jazz Is... (Criss Cross Jazz, 2002)
- Faye Carol, Forever Dynamic (Getdown Records, 2026)
- Faye Carol, Faye Sings The Blues (Getdown Records, 2026)
