= Into the Silence =

Into the Silence may refer to:

- Into the Silence (Sethian album), 2003
- Into the Silence (Avishai Cohen album), 2016
- "Into the Silence" (song), a 2012 song by Robbie Williams from the album Take the Crown
