= Tim Warfield =

American jazz saxophonist (born 1965)

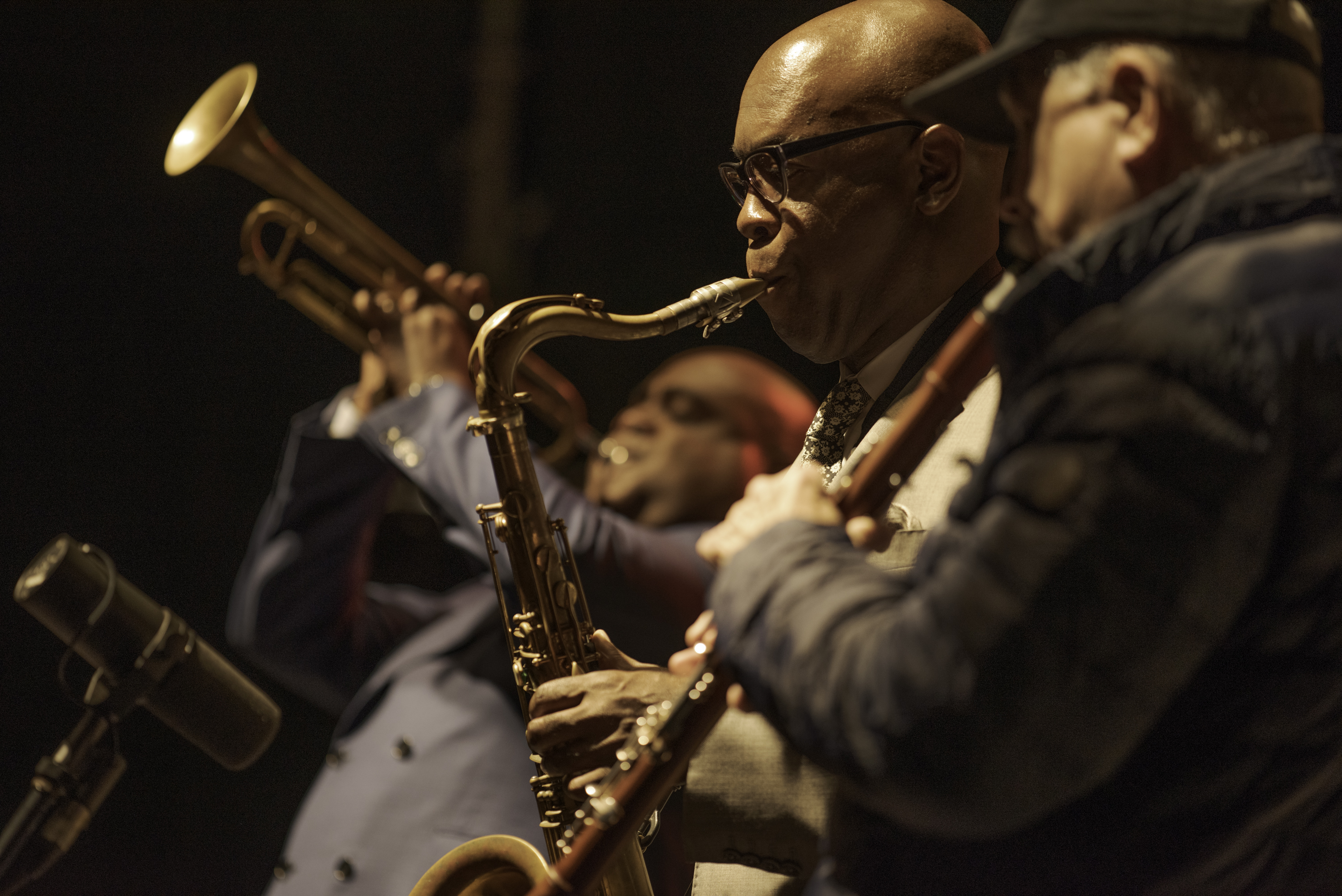
- Warfield in 2020

Background information
- Born: July 2, 1965 (age 61); York, Pennsylvania, U.S.
- Genres: Jazz
- Occupations: Musician, educator
- Instrument: Tenor saxophone
- Years active: 1990s–present
- Label: Criss Cross Jazz
- Website: timwarfieldmusic.com

Timothy Reginald Warfield Jr. (born July 2, 1965, in York, Pennsylvania) is an American jazz tenor saxophonist.

== Early life ==
Warfield picked up alto saxophone when he was nine years old, and switched to tenor when he was a teenager at William Penn Senior High School. After two years at Howard University he became a jazz musician full-time.

== Career ==
He worked with Marlon Jordan, the Tough Young Tenors, and Jazz Futures in the early 1990s, and played with Shirley Scott in the house band for Bill Cosby's show You Bet Your Life. Later in the 1990s he worked with Jimmy Smith, Christian McBride, and Nicholas Payton; other associations include work with Donald Byrd, Michele Rosewoman, Dizzy Gillespie, Isaac Hayes, Charles Fambrough, Orrin Evans, Joey Defrancesco, and Danilo Perez.

Warfield is a member of the Terell Stafford quintet. He is an assistant professor with the Boyer College of Music and Dance at Temple University in Philadelphia, as well as an artist in residence at Messiah University in Mechanicsburg, Pennsylvania. Warfield is a member of The Central Pennsylvania Friends of Jazz non-profit organization, and Governor Tom Wolf appointed him as a member of the Pennsylvania Council on the Arts in 2018.

== Discography ==
- A Cool Blue, (Criss Cross Jazz, 1995), with Terell Stafford, Cyrus Chestnut, Tarus Mateen, and Clarence Penn
- A Whisper in the Midnight (Criss Cross Jazz, 1996), with Stafford, Stefon Harris, Chestnut, Mateen, and Penn
- Gentle Warrior (Criss Cross Jazz, 1998), with Chestnut, Mateen, Penn, Stafford, and Nicholas Payton
- Jazz Is... (Criss Cross Jazz, 2002), with Penn, Chestnut, Payton, Harris, and Mateen
- One for Shirley (Criss Cross Jazz, 2008)
- A Sentimental Journey (Criss Cross Jazz, 2010)
- Tim Warfield's Jazzy Christmas (Undaunted Music, 2012)
- Eye of the Beholder (Criss Cross Jazz, 2013)
- Inspire Me (CD Baby, 2013)
- Spherical (Criss Cross Jazz, 2015), dedicated to Thelonious Sphere Monk
- Jazzland (Criss Cross Jazz, 2018)

=== As sideman ===
With Nicholas Payton

- Dear Louis (Verve, 2001)
- Sonic Trance (Warner Bros., 2003)

With Adonis Rose

- Song for Donise (Criss Cross, 1998)
- The Unity (Criss Cross, 1999)
- On the Verge (Criss Cross, 2007)

With Terell Stafford

- Taking Chances: Live at the Dakota (Maxjazz, 2005)
- This Side of Strayhorn (Maxjazz, 2011)

With others

- Stefon Harris, The Grand Unification Theory (Blue Note, 2003)
