= Jason Moran (musician) =

American jazz pianist, composer, educator (born 1975)

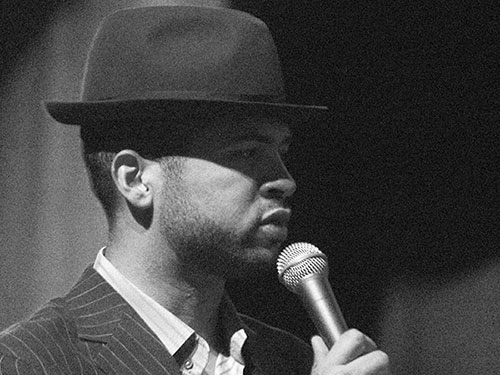

Background information
- Born: January 21, 1975 (age 51); Houston, Texas, U.S.
- Genre: Jazz
- Occupations: Musician, composer
- Instrument: Piano
- Website: jasonmoran.com

Jason Moran (born January 21, 1975) is an American jazz pianist, composer, and educator involved in multimedia art and theatrical installations.

Moran recorded first with Greg Osby and debuted as a band leader with the 1999 album Soundtrack to Human Motion. Since then, Moran has released albums with his trio The Bandwagon, solo, as a sideman, and with other bands. He combines post-bop and avant-garde jazz, blues, classical music, stride piano, and hip hop.

== Career ==
=== Early years ===
Moran was born in Houston, Texas, and grew up in the Pleasantville neighborhood of Houston. His parents, Andy, an investment banker, and Mary, a teacher, encouraged his musical and artistic sensibilities at the Houston Symphony, museums and galleries, and through a relationship with John T. Biggers and a collection of their own. Moran began training at classical piano playing, in Yelena Kurinets' Suzuki method music school, when he was six. However, his father's extensive record collection (around 10,000 in 2004), varied from Motown to classical to avant-garde jazz.

As a boy he developed a preference for hip hop music over the piano until, at the age of 13, he first heard the song "′Round Midnight" by Thelonious Monk at home, and switched his efforts to jazz. Monk's childlike melodies, with their many silent spaces, struck him as relatively easy to play and not overly ornate, while the rhythms were reminiscent of hip hop songs, and the harmonies unorthodox. Both jazz and hip hop were part of Houston's skateboarding scene in which he was involved.

He attended Houston's High School for the Performing and Visual Arts (HSPVA), graduating in 1993 from the jazz program headed by Robert Morgan. In his senior year, he was student director of the school's jazz combo and part of the Texas high school all-state jazz ensemble.

=== Late 1990s ===
He then enrolled at the Manhattan School of Music, from which he would graduate in 1997 with a BM degree, to study with pianist Jaki Byard. The next year he participated in Betty Carter's Jazz Ahead exclusive workshop, composing the piece "Make a Decision" for the final concert.

In 1997, when Moran was a senior at Manhattan School of Music, he was invited to join the band of saxophonist Greg Osby for a European tour, following a conversation that lingered mostly on older piano jazz, and no audition. Osby liked his playing, and Moran continued to play with Osby's group upon their return to the United States, making his first recorded appearance on Osby's 1997 Blue Note album Further Ado. He would subsequently appear on several other Osby albums, and Osby would introduce him to avant-garde pianists Muhal Richard Abrams and Andrew Hill.

His stint with Osby led Moran to sign a contract of his own with Blue Note. His debut Soundtrack to Human Motion was released in 1998. Moran was joined on the album by Osby, drummer Eric Harland (a classmate of Moran's at the Manhattan School, and the one who recommended him to Osby), vibraphonist Stefon Harris and acoustic bassist Lonnie Plaxico.

=== 2000s ===
Moran's next album, 2000's Facing Left (after a work by Egon Schiele), featured a trio that formed out of Osby's group, New Directions: Moran, bassist Tarus Mateen and drummer Nasheet Waits. Compositions were some of Moran's and some by Mateen, Duke Ellington, Björk and Byard. The trio, which came to be known as The Bandwagon, was joined by saxophonist and pianist Sam Rivers for their next album, Black Stars, which appeared in 2001. Black Stars was included in NPR's "The 50 Most Important Recordings of the Decade."

In 2002, Moran released a solo album, Modernistic, and followed it in 2003 with a live trio album, recorded at New York's Village Vanguard, called The Bandwagon.

That same summer he appeared in the Montreal International Jazz Festival, first partnering with Lee Konitz, and then with the trio. In 2004 he played on Don Byron's Ivey-Divey. The Ivey-Divey Trio (sometimes a quartet) toured for a number of years, from the Monterey Jazz Festival 2004 to Montreal's Jazz Festival in 2006 to WinterJazzFest in 2009.

Moran's 2005 album Same Mother, an exploration of the blues, brought guitarist Marvin Sewell into the Bandwagon mix.

Moran's 2006 release, Artist in Residence, included a number of selections from different works commissioned by museums, all of which premiered in 2005: "Milestone" is centered on a visual work by Adrian Piper from the Walker Art Center; "The Shape, the Scent, the Feel of Things" was incorporated into a preexisting installation of that name by artist Joan Jonas; and "RAIN", inspired by ring shouts from African American slaves, is a recording of The Bandwagon with guests Marvin Sewell, Ralph Alessi and Abdou Mboup. Critical reception to Artist in Residence has been arguably colder that to his other releases.

Moran's IN MY MIND, premiered in 2007, is a multimedia presentation inspired by Thelonious Monk's 1959 "large band" concert at The Town Hall in New York City. It utilises filmed and taped material of Monk's rehearsal, found in the archive of W. Eugene Smith, and video art by David Dempewolf. A text-laden painting from Glenn Ligon extracted the words "In My Mind" - which Monk says on one of Smith's tapes – as did Moran, incorporating the soundbite into the set. The program is played by The Big Bandwagon: the trio with a largely changeable five piece horn section. The New York Times wrote: "It had a magical balance of theory and intuition, and the crowd stayed fully with it." The February 2009 installation is the subject of a documentary film of the same name.

In April 2007, Moran took the piano in Charles Lloyd's New Quartet, succeeding Geri Allen. He was the last member to join the group, which keeps touring (as of 2014), having recorded one studio album and two live ones. Moran and Lloyd recorded a duo album, Hagar's Song, in 2013.

From September 2009 to about 2012, Moran toured with Dave Holland's Overtone Quartet.

"Live: Time" is a 2008 complement to the Philadelphia Museum of Art exhibition on The Quilts of Gee's Bend. Cane was written for classical wind quintet Imani Winds - among them Moran's college classmate Toyin Spellman. It premiered in October 2008, and appeared in their album Terra Incognita in 2010; it relates to Marie Thérèse Metoyer and Moran's family history in Natchitoches, Louisiana. "Refraction" is a ballet Moran scored and accompanied for Alonzo King LINES Ballet in 2009. Four independent short films and a feature documentary appeared in the 2000s with soundtracks by Moran (see below). In addition, he collaborated with Ligon on 2008's The Death of Tom: an abstract, conceptual, video artwork. Reflecting their shared historical interests, Moran contributed a score based on the song "Nobody" by Bert Williams. The work is in the MoMA collection, but he played to it again in a screening in 2011.

=== 2010s ===
The album Ten, released in 2010, marked a ten-year interval from the Bandwagon's debut, Facing Left. It features "Blue Blocks" off the Philadelphia Museum commission, "RFK in the Land of Apartheid", from an original score to a documentary film of the same name, and "Feedback Pt. 2", an homage to Jimi Hendrix's performance at the 1967 Monterey Pop Festival. Monk's "Crepuscule with Nellie" was recorded at the IN MY MIND tour. Ten also contains a composition by Moran and Andrew Hill, and others by Leonard Bernstein, Jaki Byard, Conlon Nancarrow and Bert Williams. The Downbeat 2010 critics' poll voted Ten "Jazz Album of the Year", while also voting Moran "Pianist of the Year" and "Jazz Artist of the Year". The New York Times chose Ten among 2010 top 10 pop and jazz albums.

Since 2011 Moran has been performing the show "Fats Waller dance party", originally commissioned by Harlem Stage. It became the basis of a 2014 release, All Rise: A Joyful Elegy for Fats Waller, dedicated to Fats Waller and the form of popular entertainment that jazz was in his days. Participants in the fluid roster have included singers Meshell Ndegeocello, in a co-leader position, and Lisa E. Harris, drummer Charles Haynes' ensemble with trumpeter Leron Thomas and trombonist Josh Roseman, saxophonist Steve Lehman and bassist Mark Kelly.

Moran's composition, "Slang", was commissioned for the 2011 Other Minds Festival in San Francisco. In the May 2012 Whitney Biennial, Alicia Hall Moran and Jason curated BLEED, a week-long event that involved many artists and artisans, and aimed to expose artistic processes to the point "it has to be scary". Later that year a new performance with Joan Jonas, Reanimation was first staged in dOCUMENTA (13). In the summer of 2013 and the next, Moran accompanied, with The Bandwagon and guest Jeff Parker, skateboarding shows in SFJAZZ Center.

In April 2014 Moran and Imani Winds premiered Jump Cut Rose, which he wrote for the quintet and a piano, In May, Looks of A Lot, a theatrical co-production with Theaster Gates on the theme of Chicago artistic history premiered in the city's Symphony Center; participants included The Bandwagon, the Kenwood Academy Jazz Band, Ken Vandermark and Katie Ernst, bassist and vocalist. The same month, the Bandwagon played their composition, "The Subtle One", to a ballet adaptation by Ronald K. Brown. In September he appeared twice in the Monterey Jazz Festival: Leading a Fats Waller Dance Party, in a one-piano duo with Robert Glasper, and with Charles Lloyd New Quartet. He was responsible for the music of the multi-nominated 2016 documentary 13th.

In 2017, Jason Moran collaborated with the visual artist Julie Mehretu creating MASS (HOWL, eon). Presented as part of the Performa 17 biennial, this work took the audience on an intensive tour of Mehretu's canvas while Moran played his composition accompanied by Graham Haynes on coronet and sound effects, and Jamire Williams on drums.

In addition to recordings under his own name, Moran has recorded with a range of other musicians including Greg Osby, Steve Coleman, Charles Lloyd, Cassandra Wilson, Joe Lovano, Christian McBride, Von Freeman, Francisco Mela, and Don Byron. He also performed with Marian McPartland, Lee Konitz, Wayne Shorter (as substitute), Robert Glasper, violinist Jenny Scheinman, The Bad Plus, guitarist Mary Halvorson and trumpeter Ron Miles, drummer Herlin Riley, Dave Holland (Overtone Quartet), and Bill Frisell.

== Teaching and organization ==
Moran has been on the faculty of the New England Conservatory of Music since 2010, where he coaches two ensembles, teaches lessons, and gives masterclasses. At the Kennedy Center he has been the musical adviser for jazz since 2011, and artistic director for jazz since 2014, occupying the position of Billy Taylor.

Apart from these positions, Moran has organized events such as "713-->212: Houstonians in NYC" in January 2011 and Very Very Threadgill, a two-day festival dedicated to Henry Threadgill, his "favorite composer", in September 2014.

Moran and his family manage the granting of "Moran Scholarship Award", first set in 1994 for jazz students at HSPVA. In 2005 they set in Houston The Mary Lou Chester Moran Foundation, for similar purposes.

In 2013 he expressed support for the Justice for Jazz Artists campaign of the American Federation of Musicians.

In 2015 Moran was appointed Honorary Professor at the Rhythmic Music Conservatory (RMC) in Copenhagen, Denmark, where he periodically conducts workshops and master classes.

In 2026 Moran received a honorary doctorate from Mahattan School of Music.

== Awards and honors ==
Closing 2010, Francis Davis wrote in Village Voice, "Moran's only competition in the Fifth Annual Village Voice Jazz Critics' Poll was Jason Moran. Ten, his first trio album in seven years, won Album of the Year in a landslide, but that's not all. The pianist figured prominently on the runner-up, Rudresh Mahanthappa and Bunky Green's Apex, and Charles Lloyd's Mirror, which finished fourth...Add Paul Motian's Lost in a Dream...that gives the 2010 MacArthur Fellow four appearances in the Top 10"

JazzTimes' 2011 Expanded Critics' Poll voted Moran second place "Artist of the Year" and first place "Pianist of the Year"; the Charles Lloyd New Quartet, "Acoustic Group of the Year" and The Bandwagon fifth place in that category. In 2013, the New Quartet was second place in its category and Moran second in pianists.

Moran won the Jazz Journalists Association's Up-n-Coming Jazz Musician award in 2003. The Down Beat critics' poll voted him Rising Star Jazz Artist, Rising Star Pianist, and Rising Star Composer for three years (2003–05). In 2005, he was named Playboy magazine's first Jazz Artist of the Year. In 2007, he was named a USA Prudential Fellow by United States Artists. In 2010, he was named a MacArthur Fellow.

In 2013, Moran held residencies in SFJAZZ, Juilliard, and Molde Jazz Festival.

Another full-length documentary, Grammar about "jazz through Jason Moran" and genre boundaries, is in the making, after first director Radiclani Clytus had found funding in a 2012 kickstarter campaign.

In 2018, Moran received his first museum survey at the Walker Art Center and was written up as an artist-to-watch by Cultured Magazine.

In 2018, Moran wrote the score for 'Between the World and Me' by Ta-Nehisi Coates which premiered at the Apollo Theater.

== Family ==
Moran married Alicia Hall, a mezzo-soprano and artistic collaborator, in 2003. They have worked on several projects together. They live in Harlem and have twins. He has an older and a younger brother. Two of his cousins, Tony and Michael Llorens, toured with Albert King playing piano and drums, and were recorded on In Session.

== Discography ==
=== As leader/co-leader ===
Recording date	Title	Label	Year released	Notes
1998–08	Soundtrack to Human Motion	Blue Note	1999	Quintet, with Greg Osby (alto sax, soprano sax), Stefon Harris (vibraphone), Lonnie Plaxico (bass), Eric Harland (drums)
2000–01	Facing Left	Blue Note	2000	Trio, with Tarus Mateen (bass), Nasheet Waits (drums)
2001–03	Black Stars	Blue Note	2001	Quartet, with Sam Rivers (tenor sax, soprano sax, flute, piano), Tarus Mateen (bass), Nasheet Waits (drums)
2002–09	Modernistic	Blue Note	2002	Solo piano
2002–11	The Bandwagon	Blue Note	2003	Trio, with Tarus Mateen (bass), Nasheet Waits (drums); in concert
2004–05	Same Mother	Blue Note	2005	Quartet, with Marvin Sewell (guitar), Tarus Mateen (bass), Nasheet Waits (drums)
2006–01, 2006–02	Artist in Residence	Blue Note	2006	Some tracks quartet, with Marvin Sewell (guitar), Tarus Mateen (bass), Nasheet Waits (drums); some tracks quintet, with Joan Jonas (percussion), Alicia Hall Moran (vocals), or Adrian Piper (sampled vocals) added; one track sextet, with Ralph Alessi (trumpet), Abdou M'Boup (percussion) added
2010?	Ten	Blue Note	2010	Most tracks trio, with Tarus Mateen (bass), Nasheet Waits (drums); one track quintet, with Jonas Moran, Malcolm Moran (vocals) added
2014?	All Rise: A Joyful Elegy for Fats Waller	Blue Note	2014	With Leron Thomas (trumpet, vocals), Josh Roseman (trombone), Steve Lehman (sax), Tarus Mateen (bass), Nasheet Waits (drums), Charles Haynes (drums, vocals), Meshell Ndegeocello and Lisa E. Harris (vocals)
2016–03	The Armory Concert	Yes	2016	Solo piano; in concert
2016–10	Bangs	Yes	2017	Trio, with Ron Miles (cornet), Mary Halvorson (guitar)
2016–11	Thanksgiving at The Vanguard	Yes	2017	Trio, with Tarus Mateen (bass), Nasheet Waits (drums); in concert
2017–06	Mass {Howl, Eon}	Yes	2017	With Graham Haynes (cornet, electronics), Jamire Williams (drums)
2017–06	Looks of a Lot	Yes	2018	With Tarus Mateen (bass), Nasheet Waits (drums), Ken Vandermark (tenor sax, clarinet), Katie Ernst (vocals, bass), Theaster Gates (vocals), Kenwood Academy Jazz Band
2017–12	Music for Joan Jonas	Yes	2018	[3CD] With Joan Jonas (spoken word, percussion), Jose Luis Blondet (spoken word), Ánde Somby (vocals)
2021–01	The Sound Will Tell You	Yes	2021	Solo piano
2018	Graves / Moran - Live at Big Ears	Yes	2021	Duo with Milford Graves
2022?	From the Dancehall to the Battlefield	Yes	2023	With Tarus Mateen (bass), Nasheet Waits (drums), David Adewumi (trumpet), Reginald Cyntje and Chris Bates (trombone), Brian Settles (tenor sax), Logan Richardson (alto sax), Darryl Harper (clarinet), Jose Davila (tuba, helicon)
2022–05	Refract	Red Hook	2023	Trio, co-led with BlankFor.Ms (electronics, tape loops, processing), Marcus Gilmore (drums)
2023	Go to Your North	Yes	2025	Jason Moran x Trondheim Jazz Orchestra & Ole Morten Vågan
2025?	Jason Moran Plays Duke Ellington	Yes	2026	Solo piano
2024	Shards	Red Hook	2026	Trio, co-led with BlankFor.Ms (electronics, tape loops, processing), Marcus Gilmore (drums)

=== Movie soundtracks and art video ===
- Two Three Time (2002)
- Five Deep Breaths (2003)
- All We Know of Heaven (2004)
- Stutter (2007)
- RFK in the Land of Apartheid: A Ripple of Hope (2009)
- Selma (2014)
- Luanda-Kinshasa (2015) – art video
- 13th (2016)
- Traveling While Black (2019)
- Aggie (2020)

=== As sideman ===
With Ralph Alessi

- Cognitive Dissonance (CAM Jazz, 2010)
- Baida (ECM, 2013) – rec. 2012

With Steve Coleman and Five Elements

- The Sonic Language of Myth – Believing, Learning, Knowing (RCA Victor, 1999)
- Weaving Symbolics (Label Bleu, 2006)[2CD]
- Another Place (Label Bleu, 2006) – rec. 2004

With Bunky Green

- Another Place (Label Bleu, 2006) – rec. 2004
- Apex (Pi Recordings, 2010)

With Stefon Harris

- A Cloud of Red Dust (Blue Note, 1998) – rec. 1997
- Black Action Figure (Blue Note, 1999)

With Charles Lloyd

- 2006: Rabo de Nube (ECM, 2007) – live
- 2009: Mirror (ECM, 2010)
- 2010: Athens Concert (ECM, 2011) – live
- 2012: Hagar's Song (ECM, 2013)
- 2016: Passin' Thru (Blue Note, 2017) – live
- 2024: The Sky Will Still Be There Tomorrow (Blue Note, 2024)

With Ron Miles

- 2016: I am a Man (Enja, 2017)
- 2019: Rainbow Sign (Blue Note, 2020)

With Greg Osby

- Further Ado (Blue Note, 1997)
- Banned in New York (Blue Note, 1998) – live rec. 1997
- Zero (Blue Note, 1998)
- Friendly Fire (Blue Note, 1998)
- New Directions (Blue Note, 2000) – live rec. 1999
- Symbols of Light (A Solution) (Blue Note, 2001)
- Inner Circle (Blue Note, 2002)

With Walter Smith III

- III (Criss Cross, 2010)
- Three of Us Are from Houston and Reuben Is Not (Blue Note, 2024)

With others

- Don Byron, Ivey-Divey (Blue Note, 2004)
- Scott Colley, Architect of the Silent Moment (CAM Jazz, 2007)
- Christian McBride, Live at Tonic (Ropeadope, 2006) – live
- Paul Motian, Lost in a Dream with Chris Potter (ECM, 2010) – live
- David Murray, Blues for Memo (Doublemoon, 2016)
- Eric Revis, Parallax (Clean Feed, 2013)
- Jenny Scheinman, Crossing the Field (Koch, 2008)
- Otis Taylor, Pentatonic Wars and Love Songs (Telarc, 2009)
- Henry Threadgill, Old Locks and Irregular Verbs (Pi Recordings, 2016)
- Trio 3, Refraction – Breakin' Glass (Intakt, 2013)
- Nasheet Waits, Equality (Fresh Sound New Talent, 2009)
- Cassandra Wilson, Loverly (Blue Note, 2008)
