= Nasheet Waits =

American jazz drummer (born 1971)

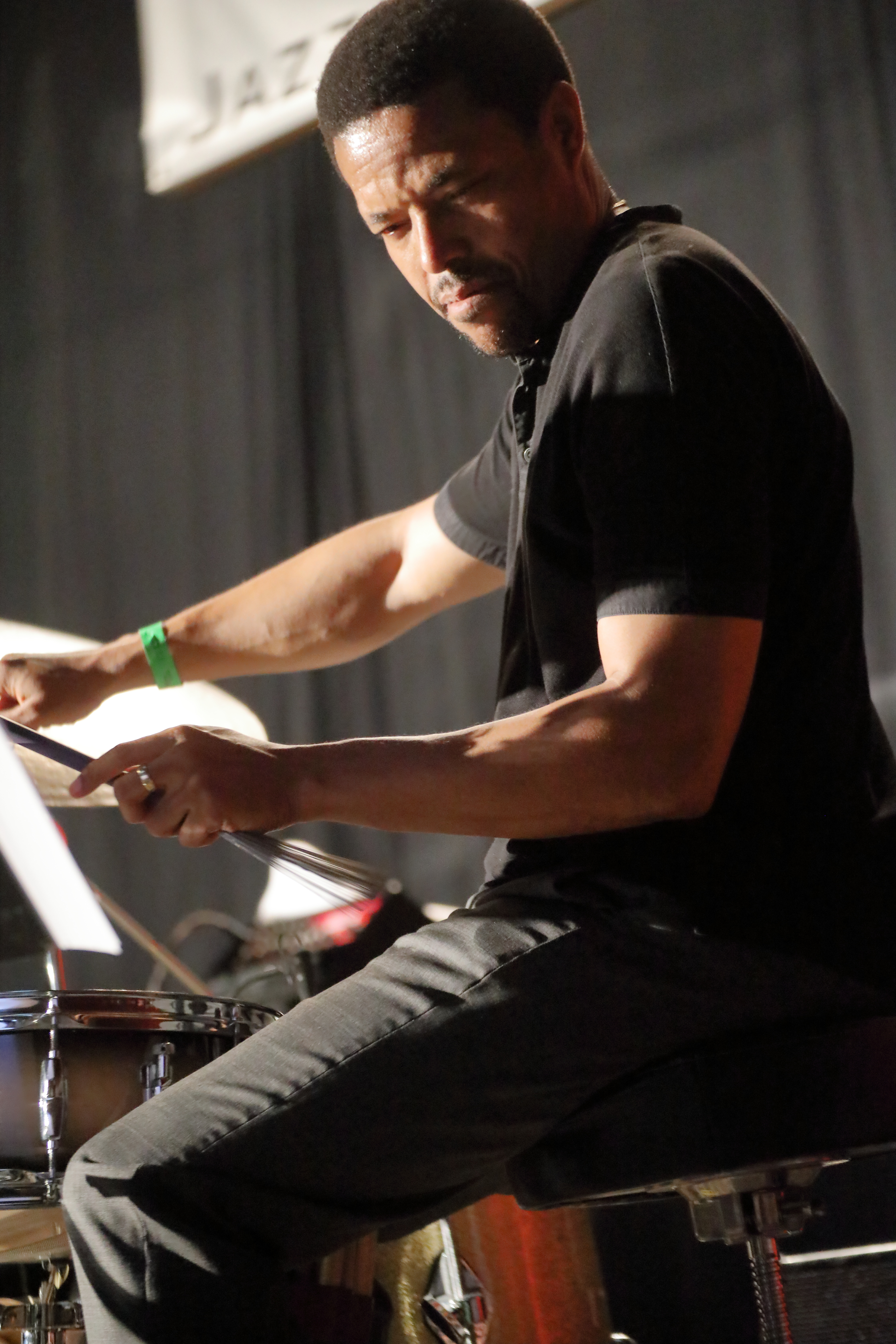

Background information
- Born: June 15, 1971 (age 55); New York City
- Genre: Jazz
- Occupation: Musician
- Instrument: Drums
- Years active: 1993–present
- Formerly of: The New Jazz Composers Octet
- Website: www.nasheetwaits.com

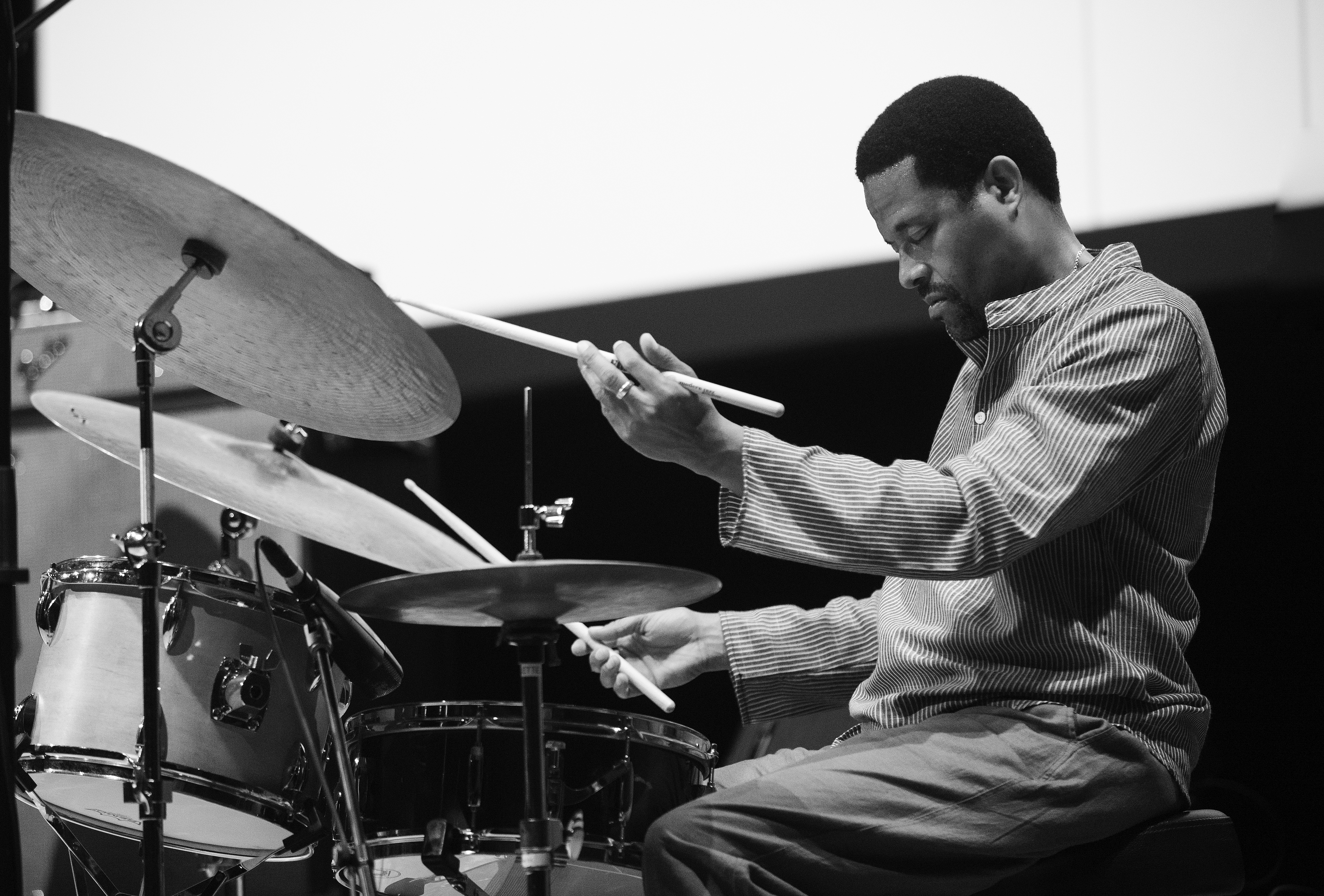
Nasheet Waits, Arts for Art - Vision Festival 2024. Photo by Marek Lazarski

Nasheet Waits is an American jazz drummer.

== Early life and career ==
Waits is a New York native who has been active on the jazz scene since early in his life. His father, percussionist Freddie Waits, died when Waits was 18.

Before pursuing a music career, Waits studied psychology and history at Morehouse College in Atlanta. He also holds a degree from Long Island University in music. While he was studying at L.I.U, instructor Michael Carvin secured Waits a spot in the percussion ensemble M'Boom, started by his father (Freddie Waits) and drummer Max Roach in 1970.

Waits's longstanding projects include Jason Moran & The Bandwagon, a trio with Moran, Waits, and Tarus Mateen; Tarbaby, a trio with Eric Revis and Orrin Evans; and his band Equality.

In 2012, Hurricane Sandy caused massive flooding in the basement Westbeth studio Waits had inherited from his father in 1989.

In 2020, his group Nasheet Waits By Sea, a quartet with Nduduzo Makhathini, Immanuel Wilkins, Rashaan Carter, opened the Winter Jazzfest’s Manhattan Marathon.

== Selected discography ==
=== As a leader ===
- Equality (Fresh Sound Records, 2008)
- Between Nothingness and Infinity (Laborie, 2016)
- New York Love Letter (Bitter Sweet) (Giant Step Arts, 2024)

With Tarbaby

- Tarbaby (Imani, 2009)
- The End of Fear (Posi-tone, 2010)
- Ballad of Sam Langford (Hipnotic, 2013)
- Fanon (RogueArt, 2013)
- Dance of the Evil Toys (Clean Feed, 2022)
- You Think This America (Giant Step Arts, 2024)

=== As sideman ===
With Ralph Alessi

- Baida (ECM, 2013)
- Quiver (ECM, 2016)

With Dave Douglas

- Spirit Moves (Greenleaf, 2009)
- United Front: Brass Ecstasy at Newport (Greenleaf, 2011)
- Rare Metal (Greenleaf, 2011)

With Antonio Hart

- For Cannonball and Woody (RCA/Novus, 1993)
- All We Need (Downtown, 2004)

With Tony Malaby

- Tamarindo (Clean Feed, 2007)
- Somos Agua (Clean Feed, 2014)
- Palomo Recio (Clean Feed, 2016)

With Jason Moran

- Facing Left (Blue Note, 2000)
- Black Stars (Blue Note, 2001)
- The Bandwagon (Blue Note, 2003)
- Same Mother (Blue Note, 2005)
- Artist in Residence (Blue Note, 2006)
- Ten (Blue Note, 2010)
- All Rise: A Joyful Elegy for Fats Waller (Blue Note, 2014)
- Thanksgiving at The Vanguard (Yes, 2017)
- Looks of a Lot (Yes, 2018)

With Armen Nalbandian

- Quiet As It's Kept (Blacksmith Brother Music, 2011)
- The Holy Ghost (Blacksmith Brother Music, 2018)
- Fire Sign (Blacksmith Brother Music, 2018)
- Live in Little Tokyo Vol. I (Blacksmith Brother Music, 2018)
- Live in Little Tokyo Vol. II (Blacksmith Brother Music, 2018)
- Ghosts (Blacksmith Brother Music, 2019)
- Live on Sunset (Blacksmith Brother Music, 2019)

With Tim Berne

- The Coandă Effect (Relative Pitch, 2020)
- Tangled (Screwgun, 2022)

With others

- Komeda Project, Requiem (WM, 2009)
- Steven Bernstein, ResoNation Trio / Ultra Resonance (Royal Potato Family, 2026)
- Rob Brown, Unknown Skies (RogueArt, 2011)
- Avishai Cohen, Into the Silence (ECM, 2016), Cross My Palm with Silver (ECM, 2017)
- Steve Davis, Meant to Be (Criss Cross, 2004)
- Yelena Eckemoff, I Am a Stranger in This World (L&H, 2022)
- Orrin Evans, Blessed Ones (Criss Cross, 2001)
- Eddie Gómez, Palermo (Jazzeyes, 2007)
- Bunky Green, Another Place (Label Bleu, 2004 [2006])
- Fred Hersch, Night and the Music (Palmetto, 2007)
- Andrew Hill, A Beautiful Day (Palmetto, 2002)
- Ethan Iverson, The Purity of the Turf (Criss Cross Jazz, 2016)
- Igor Lumpert, Innertextures live (Clean Feed, 2012)
- Christian McBride, Christian McBride's New Jawn (Mack Avenue, 2018),
- Christian McBride, Prime (Mack Avenue, 2023)
- David Murray, Be My Monster Love (Motéma, 2013)
- Émile Parisien Sextet, Louise (ACT, 2022)
- Luis Perdomo, Awareness (RKM, 2007)
- Mark Turner, Dharma Days (Warner Bros., 2001)
- Florian Weber, Lucent Waters (ECM 2018)
- Anthony Wonsey, Open the Gates (Criss Cross, 1999)
- Bojan Z, Transpacifik (Label Bleu, 2003)
- John Escreet, Exception To The Rule (Criss Cross, 2011)

== Sources ==
- Drummerworld
- Jazzpar
