= Rashida Bumbray =

Rashida Bumbray is an American curator, choreographer, author, visual and performing arts critic who lives and works in New York City. Bumbray's choreographic work Run Mary Run was included in The New York Times list of the Best Concerts of 2012. In 2014, she was nominated for the distinguished Bessie Award for “Outstanding Emerging Choreographer," and in the same year she was recipient of the Harlem Stage Fund for New Work. Bumbray is currently the Senior Program Manager of the Arts Exchange at The Open Society Foundations the Open Society Foundations.

== Education ==
Rashida Bumbray earned her Bachelor of Arts in African American Studies and Theater & Dance from Oberlin College in 2000, and completed her Master of Arts in Africana studies at New York University with a focus on Contemporary Art and Performance Studies in 2010.

== Work ==
Rashida Bumbray began her career as a curatorial assistant and exhibition coordinator at Studio Museum in Harlem (2001-2006), where she co-founded the ongoing lobby sound installation StudioSound and Hoofers’ House, a monthly jam session for tap dancers which is now called Shim Sham. She then went on to serve as the Associate Curator at The Kitchen in Chelsea, NY (2006-2012), where she organized several critically acclaimed projects and commissions, including solo exhibitions by Leslie Hewitt, Simone Leigh, Adam Pendleton, and Mai Thu Perret, as well as performances by Derrick Adams, Sanford Biggers, Kalup Linzy, and Mendi & Keith Obadike among others. She most recently served as the guest curator of Creative Time's public art exhibition Funk, God, Jazz, and Medicine: Black Radical Brooklyn (2014). Her work has been presented by Columbia University, Caribbean Cultural Center, Dancing While Black, Harlem Stage, Project Row Houses, and Weeksville Heritage Center. Additionally, she has published texts on various topics pertaining to contemporary art, Africana studies and comparative literature.

=== Run Mary Run ===
Rashida Bumbray's choreographed performance piece Run Mary Run was performed in collaboration with Dance Diaspora Collective at the Whitney Biennial as part of Jason Moran and Alicia Hall Moran’s BLEED in May 2012. It was also performed again at Queensbridge Park as part of City Parks Foundation's free outdoor performances in July 2015. The piece references African-American folk forms such as ring shouts and hoofing. The ring shout is a tradition that was developed during slavery in America as an attempt to blend African spirituality with Baptist and Methodist sects of Christianity who censured the Africana dance and drum rituals. In the dance, 12 dancers move in clockwise circles with steady rhythm, singing call-and-response patterns to chants and catchphrases in a manner that almost disguises the remnants of African traditions.

The dancers in Bumbray's piece displayed "variation in their movement," and walked about the stage as if they were just going about their daily rituals in a "dance that pretends to be just walking: people perambulating in a wide circle with a sinking, drumlike tread," as The New York Times critic Brian Seibert described it. Seibert characterized Bumbray as having a "strong grasp of the past and the past in the present". The New York Times critic, Ben Ratlif described the performance as, "motion and music and memory, entwined" in his 2012 review.

=== Funk, God, Jazz, and Medicine: Black Radical Brooklyn ===
Rashida Bumbray's guest curatorial work entitled, Funk, God, Jazz, and Medicine: Black Radical Brooklyn, was organized through Creative Time and Weeksville Heritage Center as a walkable month-long art exhibition. The exhibition launched from the Weeksville site, a Brooklyn community established by free and formerly enslaved Black citizens 11 years after abolition in New York State. The show displayed the work of four artists who through their installations engaged with the communities in and around the Weeksville Heritage Center. The installations focused on Funk by Xenobia Bailey, Medicine by Simone Leigh, Jazz by Otabenga Jones & Associates, and God by Bradford Young. The work drew from stories on how self-determination can be achieved through the claiming and holding of a neighborhood–but also from radical local battles for land and dignity from the 1960s to today. The exhibition explored the implications of gentrification, specifically in the neighborhood of Crown Heights' in Brooklyn which received a 25.2% rent rate increase in 2014. Each installation in the exhibition was located at sites throughout the neighborhood, significant of black radical self-determination, expression, and world building. The sites reflected a history of how Weeksville’s institutional lineage has traversed what Jonathan Tarleton describes in his article Black Radical Weeksville as, "challenges of historic preservation, the pressures of real estate speculation, the complexities of art and culture acting as community catalysts, and the hopes and fears surrounding shifting neighborhood dynamics." The exhibitions focus on local participation was intended to celebrate the neighborhood and its existing members rather than use art as a way to draw the general public toward a community, thus making it desirable to new residents, instead of addressing contemporary realities.
