= Tony Llorens =

- Born: Anthony Sylvan Llorens Jr. August 2, 1952 (age 73); Pineville, Louisiana, U.S.
- Occupations: Musician, composer
- Instruments: Piano, keyboards

Anthony Sylvan Llorens Jr. (born August 2, 1952) is an American musician, composer, pianist, and actor.

== Career ==
Llorens is known for the films A Wedding (1978), No God, No Master (2013) and Heavens Fall (2006). He has worked as music director for Chicago-based ETA Creative Arts Foundation theater. He also worked as keyboardist, bandleader, and producer for Albert King and worked with ZZ Top and Stevie Ray Vaughan.

== Personal life ==
Jason Moran is his second cousin.

== Filmography ==
As musician and composer:

Year	Films	Director
1978	A Wedding	Robert Altman
2006	Heavens Fall	Terry Green
2011	Imagining Mina	Alfredo Bejar
2013	No God, No Master	Terry Green
2013	Avenues	Aaref Rodriguez

As actor:

Year	Films	Director
1978	A Wedding	Robert Altman
1997	Dream Land	Robert Hein

== Discography ==
Year	Album	Artist	Instruments
1983	San Francisco '83 (reissued as Crosscut Saw: Albert King in San Francisco with two bonus tracks)	Albert King	keyboards
1984	I'm in a Phone Booth, Baby	Albert King	producer, keyboards
1991	Roadhouse Blues	Albert King	piano
1993	Delmark 40th Anniversary Blues	various artists	piano
1993	Lay It on 'em Girls	Big Time Sarah	piano, organ
1993	The Ultimate Collection	Albert King	piano
1996	Women of Blue Chicago	various artists	piano, organ
1999	In Session	Albert King, Stevie Ray Vaughan	piano, organ
2000	Blues at Sunrise	Stevie Ray Vaughan, Double Trouble	keyboards
2000	SRV	Stevie Ray Vaughan	piano
2001	Introducing Maia	Maia	piano, primary artist
2001	Less Sense Than Logic: It's Better to Have a One W	Less Sense Than Logic	keyboards, orchestration
2006	Stax Profiles	Albert King	organ
2009	Ultimate Blues [Decca]	various artists	organ, drums
2011	The Definitive Albert King on Stax	Albert King	piano

== See also ==
- "Give Me the Simple Life" from A Wedding (1978)
