= Soundtrack to Human Motion =

Studio album by Jason Moran
- Released: 1999
- Recorded: August 29–30, 1998
- Studio: Systems Two, Brooklyn, NY
- Genre: Jazz
- Length: 52:43
- Label: Blue Note
- Producer: Greg Osby for Oztone Productions

Jason Moran chronology
Soundtrack to Human Motion (1999)	Facing Left (2000)

Soundtrack to Human Motion is the debut album by American pianist and composer Jason Moran, recorded in 1998 and released on the Blue Note label the following year.

== Reception ==
Professional ratings
Review scores
Source	Rating
AllMusic	4/5 stars
DownBeat	4/5 stars
The Penguin Guide to Jazz Recordings	3.5/4 stars

The AllMusic retrospective review by Heather Phares called it an "impressive first album", stating: "Jazz pianist/composer Jason Moran's debut, Soundtrack to Human Motion, approaches his music with an abstract, impressionistic outlook".

All About Jazz reviewer David Adler said, "Can we all just agree that this is the debut of the year, if not the record of the year? Jazz has seen its share of excellent young players, but 24-year-old pianist Jason Moran really raises the bar with his superb Soundtrack to Human Motion... Watch this man closely and see what develops".

In JazzTimes, Duck Baker wrote that "Moran has plenty of pianistic ideas, and repeated listens reveal how he is moving into his own way of dealing... This is good music that can only get better if Moran stays his course".

DownBeat reviewer Aaron Cohen gave the album 4 stars. He wrote, "The group on Soundtrack To Human Motion creates an atmosphere where subtle interplay and an awareness of silence are emphasized. Their finesse and camaraderie are striking".

== Track listing ==
All compositions by Jason Moran except where noted

1. "Gangsterism on Canvas" – 4:37
2. "Snake Stance" – 4:41
3. "Le Tombeau de Couperin / States of Art" (Maurice Ravel, Jason Moran) – 5:23
4. "Still Moving" – 5:56
5. "JAMO Meets SAMO" – 5:35
6. "Kinesics" – 3:04
7. "Aquanaut" – 6:22
8. "Retrograde" – 6:25
9. "Release from Suffering" – 5:15
10. "Root Progression" – 5:22

== Personnel ==
- Jason Moran – piano
- Greg Osby – alto saxophone, soprano saxophone
- Stefon Harris – vibraphone
- Lonnie Plaxico – bass
- Eric Harland – drums
