= Same Mother =

Studio album by Jason Moran
- Released: February 1, 2005
- Recorded: May 15–16, 2004
- Studio: Systems Two, Brooklyn, NY
- Genre: Jazz
- Length: 48:48
- Label: Blue Note
- Producer: Jason Moran

Jason Moran chronology
The Bandwagon (2003)	Same Mother (2005)	Artist in Residence (2006)

Same Mother is the sixth album by American pianist and composer Jason Moran which was released on the Blue Note label in 2005.

== Reception ==
Professional ratings
Review scores
Source	Rating
Allmusic	4/5 stars
Allmusic	4.5/5 stars
The Guardian	4/5 stars
The Penguin Guide to Jazz Recordings	3/4 stars

The AllMusic review by Matt Collar said "Boundary-pushing pianist Jason Moran expands his sound yet again with a blend of modern electric and acoustic blues on Same Mother ... for fans of both forward-thinking jazz and roots music, Same Mother -- a conceptual nod to the unifying notion that we are all ultimately descended from one mother -- holds considerable surprises".

All About Jazz stated, "Same Mother is a re-examination of the blues, not so much of its formal or harmonic elements, but rather its emotional and aesthetic constituents ... Ever since his arrival on the scene in the mid-1990s, Jason Moran has been a unique voice. He brings a wide-ranging, very contemporary perspective to even the oldest materials, including the blues. Same Mother is a triumph".

In The Guardian, John Fordham wrote "This fierce but idiomatically familiar set augments the superb trio Moran has run since the late 1990s (bassist Tarus Mateen and drummer Nasheet Waits) with guitarist Marvin Sewell, on a repertoire that ransacks the retro and reforges it in the furnace of Moran's imagination".

In JazzTimes, Geoffrey Himes noted "Moran has once again demonstrated how jazz can reinvigorate itself by reaching beyond the usual show tunes and hard-bop rewrites to find new material for improvisation. Whether the material is classical music, hip-hop or blues, the trick, Moran implies, is to recognize the family resemblance between jazz and its musical relative without mistaking them for identical twins".

== Track listing ==
All compositions by Jason Moran except where noted

1. "Gangsterism On the Rise" – 2:54
2. "Jump Up" – 5:48
3. "Aubade" (Andrew Hill, Moran) – 4:29
4. "G Suit Saltation" – 6:01
5. "I'll Play the Blues for You" (Jerry Beach) – 7:41
6. "Fire Waltz" (Mal Waldron) – 4:36
7. "Field of the Dead" (Sergei Prokofiev) – 5:19
8. "Restin'" – 4:15
9. "The Field" (Alicia Hall Moran) – 4:06
10. "Gangsterism On the Set" – 3:39

== Personnel ==
- Jason Moran – piano
- Marvin Sewell – acoustic guitar, electric guitar
- Tarus Mateen – acoustic bass, acoustic-electric bass
- Nasheet Waits – drums
