= The Bandwagon (album) =

Live album by Jason Moran
- Released: 2003
- Recorded: November 29–30, 2002
- Venue: Village Vanguard, NYC
- Genre: Jazz
- Length: 58:29
- Label: Blue Note
- Producer: Jason Moran

Jason Moran chronology
Modernistic (2002)	The Bandwagon (2003)	Same Mother (2005)

The Bandwagon is a live album by pianist/composer Jason Moran recorded at the Village Vanguard in 2002 and released on the Blue Note label.

The album is notable for the variety of source material for its songs. In addition to covers of classical, jazz, and popular music, The Bandwagon includes original music built on several voice recordings, including a Turkish telephone conversation ("Straight Outta Istanbul") and Chinese stock reports ("Infospace").

== Reception ==
Professional ratings
Review scores
Source	Rating
Allmusic	4/5 stars
All About Jazz	3.5/5 stars
The Penguin Guide to Jazz Recordings	4/4 stars

The AllMusic review by Steve Loewy stated "You cannot help but look forward to each new release from Jason Moran, whose fertile imagination toys with established ways just enough to raise some eyebrows. He is more than an eyebrow-raiser, of course, and his prodigious technique coupled with a tendency to gently push the borders leads to sometimes riveting and almost always interesting results. These tracks are taken from a six-day live gig at New York's Village Vanguard ... Though still young when this was recorded, Moran enters and confronts a world that few have dared to challenge, yet he emerges as a stylist and technician with loads to say. Rather than resting on the laurels of the past, Moran stakes a future that incorporates a new jazz mainstream that is not afraid to challenge and define its own way: thankful, yet not beholden to the past, with one ear hooked to the future".

All About Jazz reviewer Mark F. Turner said, "Jason Moran's Bandwagon forges a path of individuality that is in stark contrast to typical jazz piano trios. The artist is well known for his prodigious talent and his much-earned respect for being both unconventional and progressive in his approach. The new release is not an exception. While the true essence of recorded live performances can be difficult to capture, Moran's concert at the Village Vanguard gives an aural picture of one of today's most dynamic musicians. The new live recording may seem somewhat unusual, but the essence of the talent and wonder of the Jason Moran are intact".

The PopMatters review by Scott Hreha observed "The Bandwagon isn't Moran's attempt to jump aboard the tried-and-true, but rather a document of his working trio's stay at New York's Village Vanguard during Thanksgiving week of 2002 ... The Bandwagon is still without question one of the year's best jazz records -- a thrilling ride for anyone adventurous enough to jump on".

== Track listing ==
All compositions by Jason Moran except where noted

1. Intro (ABR.) – 0:12
2. "Another One" (Tarus Mateen) – 8:13
3. "Intermezzo, Op. 118, No. 2" (Johannes Brahms) – 6:39
4. "Ringing My Phone (Straight Outta Istanbul)" – 8:15
5. "Out Front" (Jaki Byard) – 7:57
6. "Gentle Shifts South (My Folks' Folks)" – 4:41
7. "Gangsterism on Stages" – 5:10
8. "Body & Soul" (Johnny Green, Frank Eyton, Edward Heyman, Robert Sour) – 4:14
9. "Infospace" – 3:41
10. "Planet Rock" (Arthur Baker, John Robie, Afrika Bambaataa, Soulsonic Force) – 9:27

== Personnel ==
- Jason Moran – piano
- Tarus Mateen – bass, double bass
- Nasheet Waits – drums
