= Baida (Ralph Alessi album) =

Studio album by Ralph Alessi
- Released: September 10, 2013
- Recorded: October 2012
- Studio: Avatar (New York, New York)
- Genre: Jazz
- Length: 59:12
- Label: ECM 2321
- Producer: Manfred Eicher

Ralph Alessi chronology
Only Many (2013)	Baida (2013)

Baida is an album by trumpeter Ralph Alessi recorded in October 2012 and released on ECM September the following year. The quartet features rhythm section Jason Moran, Drew Gress and Nasheet Waits.

== Reception ==
Professional ratings
Review scores
Source	Rating
The Guardian	4/5 stars

John Fordham, writing for The Guardian, commented, "occasionally the whole set sounds eerily like the mid-60s Miles Davis quintet reinvented as a shyly slinky, contemporary-cool-jazz tribute."

All About Jazz correspondent John Kelman commented "More open, more translucent and somehow more intrinsically pure, Baida welcomes Alessi to a label whose instinctive ability to find and draw out good music where it lives remains both unparalleled and fundamental to its ongoing success and reputation."

== Track listing ==
All compositions by Ralph Alessi

1. "Baida" - 5:24
2. "Chuck Barris" - 7:36
3. "Gobble Goblins" - 4:04
4. "In-Flight Entertainment" - 4:35
5. "Sanity" - 4:46
6. "Maria Lydia" - 5:46
7. "Shank" - 4:44
8. "I Go, You Go" - 6:13
9. "Throwing Like a Girl" - 5:35
10. "11/1/10" - 6:08
11. "Baida (Reprise)" - 3:32

== Personnel ==
- Ralph Alessi – trumpet
- Jason Moran – piano
- Drew Gress – double bass
- Nasheet Waits – drums
