= Cross My Palm with Silver =

2017 studio album by trumpeter Avishai Cohen

Studio album by Avishai Cohen
- Released: May 5, 2017
- Recorded: September 2016
- Studios: Studios la Buissonne; Pernes-les-Fontaines
- Genre: Jazz
- Length: 38:39
- Labels: ECM; ECM 2548
- Producer: Manfred Eicher

Avishai Cohen chronology
Into the Silence (2016)	Cross My Palm with Silver (2017)

Cross My Palm with Silver is an album by Israeli trumpeter and composer Avishai Cohen recorded in France in September 2016 and released on ECM Maynthe following year. The quartet features rhythm section Yonathan Avishai, Barak Mori, and Nasheet Waits.

== Reception ==
Professional ratings
Review scores
Source	Rating
Allmusic	4/5 stars
The Guardian	4/5 stars
All About Jazz	4/5 stars

The AllMusic review by Matt Collar notes "the Israeli-born Cohen (who studied at Boston's Berklee College of Music) was known as a boundary-pushing maverick whose various projects found him moving from extroverted bop standards to groove-oriented klezmer jazz, avant-garde improvisation, and expansive, ambient soundscapes. Cross My Palm with Silver finds Cohen achieving a better balance between his exuberant post-bop inclinations and his more poetic, classical, avant-garde side ... it's Cohen and his bandmates' deft improvisational skill and wide artistic sensibility, straddling straight-ahead jazz, classical, and the avant-garde, that helps make Cross My Palm with Silver such a bright spot in his discography."

In The Guardian, John Fordham wrote, "often echoing the spaciousness and quiet melodic strength of last year's compositionally dominant Into the Silence. The sense of ensemble conversation is more urgent, however, befitting the leader's search for music that cherishes active empathy in a fractured world."

All About Jazz reviewer Karl Ackermann stated "There remains an otherworldliness in much of Cohen's music whether elevating or affecting and he importantly, avoids saccharine effects in conveying powerful emotions."

In JazzTimes, Britt Robson wrote "the iconic production of Manfred Eicher's label again seems perfectly suited to etching forth the nuances of Cohen's exquisite tone, which manages to sound sharp and buffered at the same time."

JazzIz's Matt Micucci noted "Trumpeter and composer Avishai Cohen's sophomore release on ECM is a reflective journey that grapples with the world's existential crises today. At barely 38 minutes, the album's five tracks present a delicate interplay between temporal precision and intuitive improvisation. Cohen deftly utilizes drummer Nasheet Waits, pianist Yonathan Avishai and bassist Barak Mori to communicate the raw emotions of his music. A somber vibe and universal consciousness are the common threads that tie each piece together."

== Track listing ==
All compositions by Avishai Cohen

1. ""Will I Die, Miss? Will I Die?"" – 10:20
2. "Theme for Jimmy Greene" – 5:24
3. "340 Down" – 3:51
4. "Shoot Me in the Leg" – 12:09
5. "50 Years and Counting" – 7:03

== Personnel ==
- Avishai Cohen – trumpet
- Yonathan Avishai – piano
- Barak Mori – double bass
- Nasheet Waits – drums
