= Charles Haines =

Charles Haines may refer to:

- Charles Delemere Haines (1856–1929), American businessman and congressman
- Charles G. Haines (1792–1825), American attorney and militia officer
- Charles Haines (priest), dean of Ardfert
- Charles William Haines (1900–1973), American actor and interior designer

== See also ==
- Charles Haynes (disambiguation)
