= Alisha Wormsley =

- Born: Sewickley, Pennsylvania
- Education: Milton Avery School of Fine Arts, Bard College
- Known for: interdisciplinary artist
- Patrons: Carnegie Mellon University

Alisha B. Wormsley is an interdisciplinary artist and cultural producer. Her work is about collective memory and the synchronicity of time, specifically through the stories of women of color. She states her work is "the future, and the past, and the present, simultaneously."

== Life ==
Wormsley was born in Sewickley, Pennsylvania and raised in the Pittsburgh area. She currently resides in Pittsburgh and is an adjunct professor of art at Carnegie Mellon University. She earned an MFA in film and video at Bard College in New York, she studied anthropology in undergrad and photography and digital media at the International Center of Photography in New York.

She has been a teaching artist at various cultural institutions, including The Studio Museum of Harlem, the Children's Aid Society, The Romare Bearden Foundation, the International Center of Photography, and the August Wilson Center for African American Culture. Wormsley is a recipient of a 2022 Guggenheim Fellowship in Fine Arts.

== Selected awards ==
- City of Pittsburgh's Mayor's Award for Public Art
- Homewood Artist Residency
- Flight School Fellowship

== Selected public art installations ==
- Larimer Well Project, Pittsburgh, PA
- The People are the Light, Carnegie Museum of Art, Pittsburgh, PA
- August Wilson Park, Stargazing, Hill District, Pittsburgh, PA
- Activist Print, We Live, Andy Warhol Museum, Pittsburgh, PA

== Selected exhibitions and screenings ==
- Afronaut(a) film series DVD Magazine, UNDERGROUND
- Children of NAN featured film, Charles H. Wright Museum, Detroit MI
- Performing Blackness :: Performing Whiteness, Allegheny College, Meadville, PA
- PROOF, with Lisa E. Harris, StudioXX, HTMLLES Festival, Montreal, Canada
- Transformation of Oshe, August Wilson Center, Pittsburgh, PA
- My Mythos, Fe Gallery, Pittsburgh, PA
