= Black Stars (album) =

Studio album by Jason Moran
- Released: August 2001
- Recorded: March 16–17, 2001
- Studio: Systems Two, Brooklyn, NY
- Genre: Jazz
- Length: 57:26
- Label: Blue Note
- Producer: Greg Osby for Oztone Productions

Jason Moran chronology
| Facing Left (2000) | Black Stars (2001) | Modernistic (2002) |

Black Stars is the third album led by American pianist and composer Jason Moran, recorded and released in 2001 on the Blue Note label. It features Moran with his regular trio (bassist Tarus Mateen and drummer Nasheet Waits) alongside veteran saxophonist Sam Rivers, who plays tenor, soprano, flute and piano.

== Reception ==
Professional ratings
Review scores
| Source | Rating |
|---|---|
| Allmusic | 4/5 stars |
| The Penguin Guide to Jazz Recordings | 4/4 stars |

The AllMusic review by Steve Loewy called it "arguably his best" stating "Moran evidences an affinity for complicated snakelike post-bop lines and solo improvisations that get to the heart of a melody. His style is never showy; he embraces simple, emotional statements sophisticated in their mystery. Rivers' presence is a clear asset, and threatens to overwhelm the pianist at times. In fact, on some of the pieces it might appear that Rivers is the leader and Moran an excellent accompanist, a not unenviable position in itself. But Moran holds his own, evidencing a deep understanding of the jazz tradition that belies his youth. Moran keeps one eye on his influences and another to the future, something that Rivers has always done so well".

The PopMatters review by James Beaudreau noted "It's a tantalizing lineup, and the album delivers on its promise, with a few caveats. The music is abstract and cerebral but is often possessed of a sinister groove, and many passages have a kind of crystalline beauty".

All About Jazz reviewer C. Andrew Hovan said, "At a time when it seems that much of the current crop of new releases will have limited shelf lives at best, Moran’s music strikes a more profound chord ... All in all, this sleeper may just turn out to be one of the strongest Blue Note releases to make the scene in quite some time".

In JazzTimes, Ron Wynn wrote "The 26-year-old Moran has resisted the easy lure of the young-lion mentality and concentrated on making highly personalized music. His teaming with Rivers on Black Stars ensures that it won’t be another trip down memory lane ... this is Moran’s album, even on those tunes where Rivers offers monster tenor or soprano solos. Moran’s never overwhelmed or undone by Rivers solos, and smoothly glides between being the session leader and retreating into the section".

== Track listing ==
All compositions by Jason Moran except where noted

1. "Foot Under Foot" – 5:28
2. "Kinda Dukish" (Duke Ellington, Irving Mills) – 5:26
3. "Gangsterism on a River" – 3:41
4. "Earth Song" (Sam Rivers) – 7:23
5. "Summit" – 7:06
6. "Say Peace" – 4:12
7. "Draw the Light Out" – 6:00
8. "Out Front" (Jaki Byard) – 4:02
9. "The Sun at Midnight" – 5:42
10. "Skitter In" – 4:38
11. "Sound It Out" – 3:44

== Personnel ==
- Jason Moran – piano
- Sam Rivers – tenor saxophone, soprano saxophone, flute, piano
- Tarus Mateen – bass
- Nasheet Waits – drums
