= Ten (Jason Moran album) =

Studio album by Jason Moran
- Released: June 22, 2010
- Studio: Avatar (New York, New York)
- Genre: Jazz
- Length: 64:20
- Label: Blue Note
- Producer: Jason Moran

Jason Moran chronology
Artist in Residence (2006)	Ten (2010)	All Rise: A Joyful Elegy for Fats Waller (2014)

Ten is the eighth album by pianist and composer Jason Moran, released on the Blue Note label in 2010. It was titled to celebrate the tenth year of Moran’s trio (The Bandwagon), and also refers to the year the album was released.

== Reception ==
Professional ratings
Review scores
Source	Rating
Allmusic	3.5/5 stars
All About Jazz	4.5/5 stars
The Guardian	4/5 stars
PopMatters	8/10 stars

The AllMusic review by Matt Collar said it "features more of the jazz pianist's smart and forward-thinking jazz" and that "Moran reveals himself once again to be a nimble improviser with an ear toward atmospheric and often fractured hypnotic post-bop jazz".

All About Jazz stated, "The piano trio is a mainstay in the jazz tradition, and here the Bandwagon does a characteristically great job of being firmly in that tradition while also blazing a new trail … A sense of joy is evident in every note the group plays. Let's hope we get another 10 years, and see where they take the Bandwagon next".

In The Guardian, John Fordham called it "a balanced, varied, and very rewarding set" and wrote "This album has no guiding concept beyond his long-acquainted virtuoso trio's powers to listen and play together. It's also about how traditionally bluesy or gospel-rooted themes can be led through a contemporary world of probing, busily improvised bass counterpoint, bumpy street-groove rhythms and the occasional sampled effect".

The PopMatters review by Justin Cober-Lake called it "one of the year’s best releases" and observed "the versatility wouldn’t be remarkable if the trio wasn’t so successful in every venture. Since they are, Ten coheres as a remarkable unit, embracing an array of styles and eras of influence into something uniquely compelling".

== Track listing ==
All compositions by Jason Moran except where noted

1. "Blue Blocks" – 4:36
2. "RFK in the Land of Apartheid" – 4:10
3. "Feedback Pt. 2" – 4:54
4. "Crespuscule with Nellie" (Thelonious Monk) – 5:58
5. "Study No. 6" (Conlon Nancarrow) – 3:17
6. "Pas De Deux - Lines Ballet" – 3:31
7. "Study No. 6" (Nancarrow) – 4:04
8. "Gangsterism Over 10 Years" – 6:56
9. "Big Stuff" (Leonard Bernstein) – 5:17
10. "Play to Live" (Andrew Hill, Jason Moran) – 4:21
11. "The Subtle One" (Tarus Mateen) – 5:35
12. "To Bob Vatel of Paris" (Jaki Byard) – 6:06
13. "Old Babies" – 5:56

== Personnel ==
Musicians

- Jason Moran – piano
- Tarus Mateen – bass
- Nasheet Waits – drums
- Jonas Moran – vocals (track 13)
- Malcolm Moran – vocals (track 13)

Production

- Jason Moran – producer
- Sascha Von Oertzen – mixing engineer
- Jonathan Altschuler – assistant mixing engineer
- Rick Kwan – assistant tracking engineer
- Gene Paul – mastering engineer
- Jamie – mastering engineer
- Eli Wolf – A&R
- Antwon Jackson – A&R administration
- Louise Holland – management
- Vision Arts Management Inc. – management
- Shanieka D. Brooks – product manager
- Burton Yount – art direction, design
- Gordon H Jee – creative direction
- Adam Pendleton – design (cover)
- Clay Patrick McBride – photography
