= Roy Vue =

Apartment building in Seattle, Washington, U.S.

Coordinates: 47°37′29.5″N 122°19′36.5″W

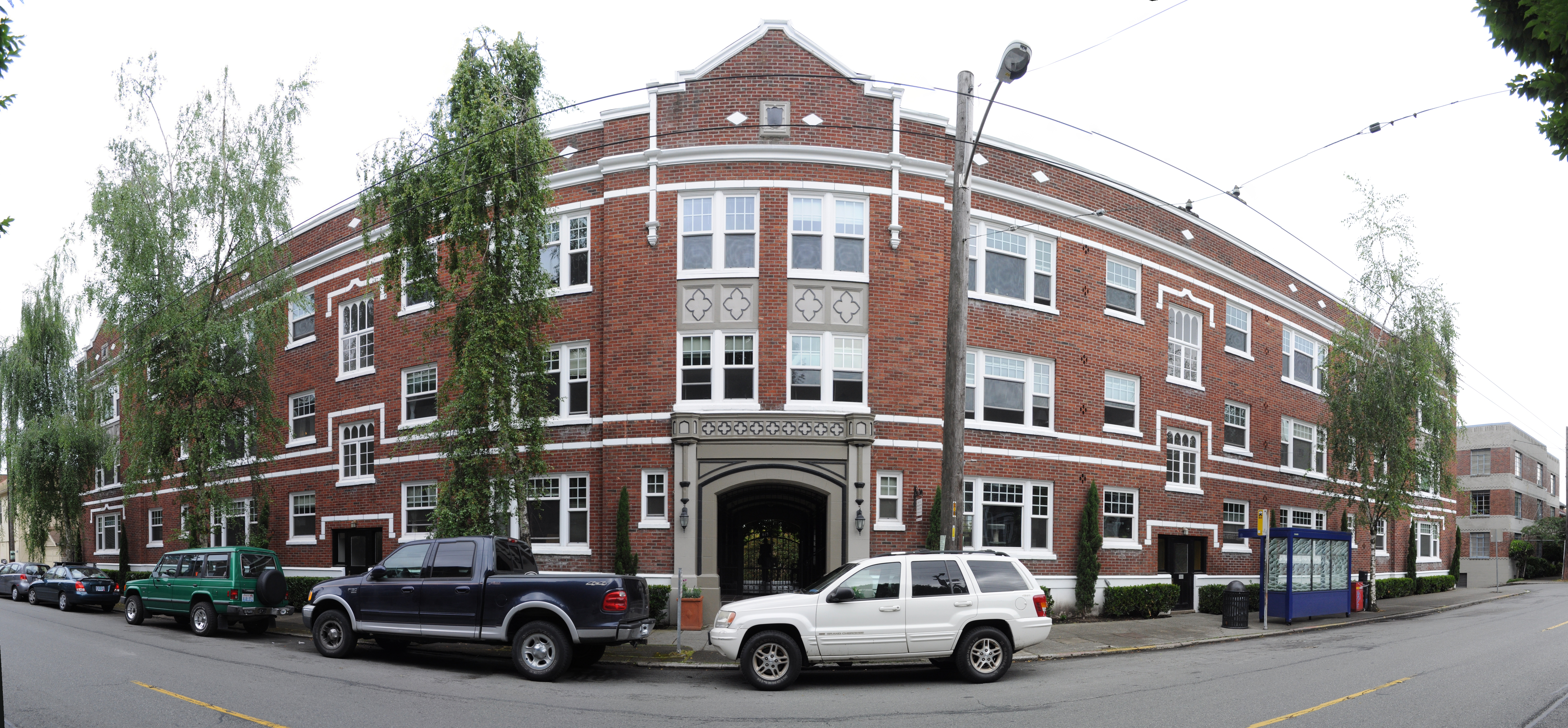
- Interactive map of the Roy Vue area

General information
- Type: Apartment
- Architectural style: semi-gothic
- Location: Seattle, Washington, U.S.
- Opened: 1924

Design and construction
- Architect: Charles Haynes

The Roy Vue is an apartment building in Seattle, United States. Constructed in 1924 on a design by Charles Haynes, the three-story structure is built in what has been described as a "semi-gothic" style, surrounding a large, landscaped courtyard of 5,000 square feet (460 m^{2}). Its red brick facade is ornamented by several typically Tudor elements such as parapeted gables.

In 2018 plans were announced to demolish the interior of the building and build-over the signature courtyard.
