= Facing Left =

Studio album by Jason Moran
- Released: June 27, 2000
- Recorded: January 15–16, 2000
- Studio: Systems Two, Brooklyn, NY
- Genre: Jazz
- Length: 56:49
- Label: Blue Note
- Producer: Greg Osby for Oztone Productions

Jason Moran chronology
Soundtrack to Human Motion (1999)	Facing Left (2000)	Black Stars (2001)

Facing Left is the second album led by American pianist and composer Jason Moran which was recorded in 2000 and released on the Blue Note label.

== Reception ==
Professional ratings
Review scores
Source	Rating
Allmusic	4/5 stars
The Penguin Guide to Jazz Recordings	3.5/4 stars

The AllMusic review by David R. Adler said "It's no easy task following up a brilliant debut like Soundtrack to Human Motion, but pianist Jason Moran does admirably well with this effort".

All About Jazz reviewer Jim Santella said, "Jason Moran has sidestepped the critics with his modern mainstream approach that blends in elements from all over the spectrum ... Moran’s second album ignores the critics. Rather than display lingering, romantic melodies on his sleeve, the pianist has chosen to continue with what he does best. Like his early influence Thelonious Monk and his teachers Jaki Byard & Richard Muhal Abrams, Jason Moran applies a considerable amount of energy to each piece. That force tends to weave several lines at once, while involving his bassist and drummer in every aspect. Together, they explore and come up with unpredictable displays every time".

In JazzTimes, Peter Margasak wrote "it’s impossible not to view him as one of the most striking originals to emerge in jazz in years. With rare technical assurance and a bold sense of vision, Moran has made a record for the ages".

== Track listing ==
All compositions by Jason Moran except where noted

1. "Later" (Duke Ellington) – 5:45
2. "Thief Without Loot" – 2:44
3. "Jóga" (Björk, Sjón) – 6:01
4. "Wig Wise" (Ellington) – 3:24
5. "Yojimbo" (Motaru Sato) – 3:15
6. "Another One" (Tarus Mateen) – 5:38
7. "Lies Are Sold" – 5:10
8. "Murder of Don Fanucci" (Carmine Coppola) – 4:04
9. "Twelve" (Jaki Byard) – 5:53
10. "Three of the Same from Two Different" – 1:47
11. "Fragment of a Necklace" – 5:41
12. "Battle of the Cattle Acts" – 3:03
13. "Gangsterism on Wood" – 4:24

== Personnel ==
- Jason Moran – piano, Hammond B3 organ, Fender Rhodes piano
- Tarus Mateen – bass
- Nasheet Waits – drums
