= All Rise: A Joyful Elegy for Fats Waller =

Studio album by Jason Moran
- Released: September 16, 2014
- Studio: Brooklyn Recording, Brooklyn, NY
- Genre: Jazz
- Length: 44:01
- Label: Blue Note
- Producer: Don Was, Meshell Ndegeocello

Jason Moran chronology
Ten (2010)	All Rise: A Joyful Elegy for Fats Waller (2014)	The Armory Concert (2016)

All Rise: A Joyful Elegy for Fats Waller is an album by Jason Moran paying tribute to pianist/composer Fats Waller which was released on the Blue Note label. And, All Rise is the studio culmination of a project that was born onstage. In 2011, Harlem Stage Gatehouse commissioned Moran to create a tribute to Fats Waller as part of its "Harlem Jazz Shrines" series.

== Reception ==
Professional ratings
Aggregate scores
Source	Rating
Metacritic	86/100
Review scores
Source	Rating
Allmusic	4.5/5 stars
All About Jazz	4.5/5 stars
The Arts Desk	5/5 stars
Chicago Tribune	3/4 stars
Financial Times	3/5 stars
The Guardian	5/5 stars
The Herald	4/5 stars
Los Angeles Times	3/4 stars
Mojo	4/5 stars
PopMatters	8/10 stars

Response was positive, with Metacritic assigning the album an aggregate score of 86 out of 100 based on 6 critical reviews indicating "Universal acclaim".

The AllMusic review by Steve Leggett called it "a marvelous tribute that still retains its own shape and coherency" and stated "it's not what one would expect. This album isn't full of stride piano, but it is full of Fats Waller's larger persona as a performer ... It's a stunning mix of piano jazz with moody, winsome late-night vocals, and it has plenty of get-up-and-go when it's time for it. If it doesn't sound much like Waller, one could imagine Waller would love it, and his signature songs are well represented".

All About Jazz reviewer Mark F. Turner said, "All Rise: A Joyful Elegy for Fats Waller re-envisions the music of the colorful pianist, singer, and entertainer who shook things up during the Harlem Renaissance in the 1920s and 1930s. Fats Waller's bright musical canvas is the perfect outlet for Moran's multicolored ideas; a boisterous amalgam of blues, jazz, and house music ... Regardless of the era in which created, music still has the ability to move listeners in varied ways whether to sing, dance, or simply listen in a new way".

The jazz critic John Fordham, writing for The Guardian, commented: "Some Waller devotees will recoil, but this is a respectful tribute from a remarkable modern-music mind".

The PopMatters review by Will Layman observed "All Rise, then, seeks to provide a contemporary vision of Waller's music. And the challenge in doing so is not one born of the music seeming so old. Waller's music has been so resilient and popular for so long ... The challenge for Moran and Ndegeocello is to refract the music in ways that make it sound more vibrant and alive than its modern jazz variants could ... All Rise proves yet again that the cultural divide, at least in "jazz", has crumbled and means little now—and that's something to get on your feet and cheer (or dance) about".

In JazzTimes, Brad Farberman noted "All Rise is a mischievous record, rearranging Waller’s tunes and then daring the listener to recognize them. Or not dance to them. All Rise benefits from a healthy dose of misbehavior".

== Track listing ==
All compositions by Jason Moran except where noted

1. "Put Your Hands on It" – 0:20
2. "Ain't Misbehavin'" (Fats Waller, Harry Brooks, Andy Razaf) – 3:42
3. "Yacht Club Swing" (Waller, Herman Autrey, J. C. Johnson) – 4:02
4. "Lulu's Back In Town" (Harry Warren, Al Dubin) – 2:38
5. "Two Sleepy People" (Hoagy Carmichael, Frank Loesser) – 4:07
6. "The Joint Is Jumpin'" (Waller, Johnson, Razaf) – 5:10
7. "Honeysuckle Rose" (Waller, Razaf) – 3:48
8. "Ain't Nobody's Business" (Porter Grainger, Everett Robbins) – 4:20
9. "Fats Elegy" – 1:46
10. "Handful of Keys" (Waller) – 2:55
11. "Jitterbug Waltz'" (Waller) – 6:13
12. "Sheik of Araby/I Found a New Baby" (Ted Snyder, Harry B. Smith, Francis Wheeler/Jack Palmer, Spencer Williams) – 5:00

== Personnel ==
Musicians

- Jason Moran – piano, Wurlitzer electric piano, Rhodes piano
- Leron Thomas – trumpet, vocals
- Josh Roseman – trombone
- Steve Lehman – saxophone
- Tarus Mateen – bass, double bass
- Nasheet Waits – drums
- Charles Haynes – drums, vocals
- Meshell Ndegeocello – vocals
- Lisa E. Harris – vocals

Production

- Don Was – producer, A&R
- Meshell Ndegeocello – producer
- Bob Power – engineer (recording tracks 1–3, 5–11 & mixing)
- Rick Kawn – engineer (2nd)
- Andy Taub – engineer (recording tracks 4 & 12)
- Pete Min – engineer (mastering)
- Ivy Skoff – production coordinator
- Steve Cook – A&R administrator
- Hayden Miller – art direction, design
