= Artist in Residence (album) =

Studio album by Jason Moran
- Released: 2006
- Recorded: January 5 & February 16, 2006
- Studio: Systems Two, Brooklyn, NY
- Genre: Jazz
- Length: 50:00
- Label: Blue Note
- Producer: Jason Moran

Jason Moran chronology
Same Mother (2005)	Artist in Residence (2006)	Ten (2010)

Artist in Residence is an album by pianist/composer Jason Moran recorded in 2006 and released on the Blue Note label. The album features compositions commissioned by the Walker Art Center, the Dia Art Foundation and Jazz at Lincoln Center.

== Reception ==
Professional ratings
Review scores
Source	Rating
Allmusic	3.5/5 stars
All About Jazz	4/5 stars
The Guardian	4/5 stars
PopMatters	8/10 stars
The Penguin Guide to Jazz Recordings	3.5/4 stars

The AllMusic review by Thom Jurek called it "a far-reaching jazz record combining elements of post-bop, New Orleans jazz, funk, blues and even post-20th century classical music to Moran's array of shades and colors to play with" and stated "People may initially have a hard time with Artist in Residence. But it moves so freely and yet so purposely that it draws the listener into its unique soundworld slowly but deliberately, and offers plenty for the effort".

All About Jazz reviewer Mark F. Turner said, "This music is art that can be interpreted on multiple levels, depending upon one's background. Compared to Moran's earlier works, Artist In Residence may be more or less accepted by the mainstream, but fans familiar with his prodigious exploits should find more than enough here to satisfy them until his next release".

In The Guardian, John Fordham wrote "Jason Moran is another contemporary African-American jazz pianist with broad tastes and a strong sense of cultural history. ... he is more inclined to use today's street rhythms, free jazz, and a cut-and-paste attitude to all kinds of material, his own included".

The PopMatters review by Will Layman observed "this, my friends, is what we need more of in jazz: a great diversity of style and reference coming together through the singular vision of a terrific artist: Jason Moran. And if Major US Arts Institutions are ready, willing, and able to fund this kind of thing, then all the better. It's the kind of thing that could give music in academia a good name".

Not all reviewers were united in praise. In JazzTimes, Steve Greenlee noted "during several listens to Artist in Residence, the same question kept nagging at me: With six four-star albums under his belt in six years, what convinced Moran that collecting this music was a good idea? It’s not only that the music doesn’t coalesce; it’s also that it’s full of gimmickry ... Moran, despite some underdeveloped compositions, lays down some beautiful passages on his solo tracks. But ultimately this music doesn’t belong together". In The Washington Post, Geoffrey Himes wrote "This disc doesn't match Moran's recent masterpieces, 2003's "The Bandwagon" and 2005's "Same Mother," but it confirms that Moran is still pushing jazz into new territory".

== Track listing ==
All compositions by Jason Moran except where noted

1. "Break Down" – 3:17
2. "Milestone" (Alicia Hall Moran, Jason Moran) – 3:34
3. "Refraction 2" – 3:52
4. "Cradle Song" – 4:27
5. "Artists Ought to Be Writing" – 3:49
6. "Refraction 1" – 6:16
7. "Arizona Landscape" – 3:07
8. "Rain" – 11:53
9. "Lift Ev'ry Voice and Sing" (John Rosamond Johnson) – 4:53
10. "He Puts on His Coat and Leaves" – 4:52

== Personnel ==
- Jason Moran – piano
- Marvin Sewell – guitar
- Tarus Mateen – bass, double bass
- Nasheet Waits – drums
- Ralph Alessi – trumpet (track 8)
- Abdou M'Boup – djembe, kora, talking drum (track 8)
- Joan Jonas – bells, shakers, toy car, claves (track 6)
- Alicia Hall Moran – soprano (track 2)
- Adrian Piper – sampled voice (tracks 1 & 5)
