= Leron Thomas =

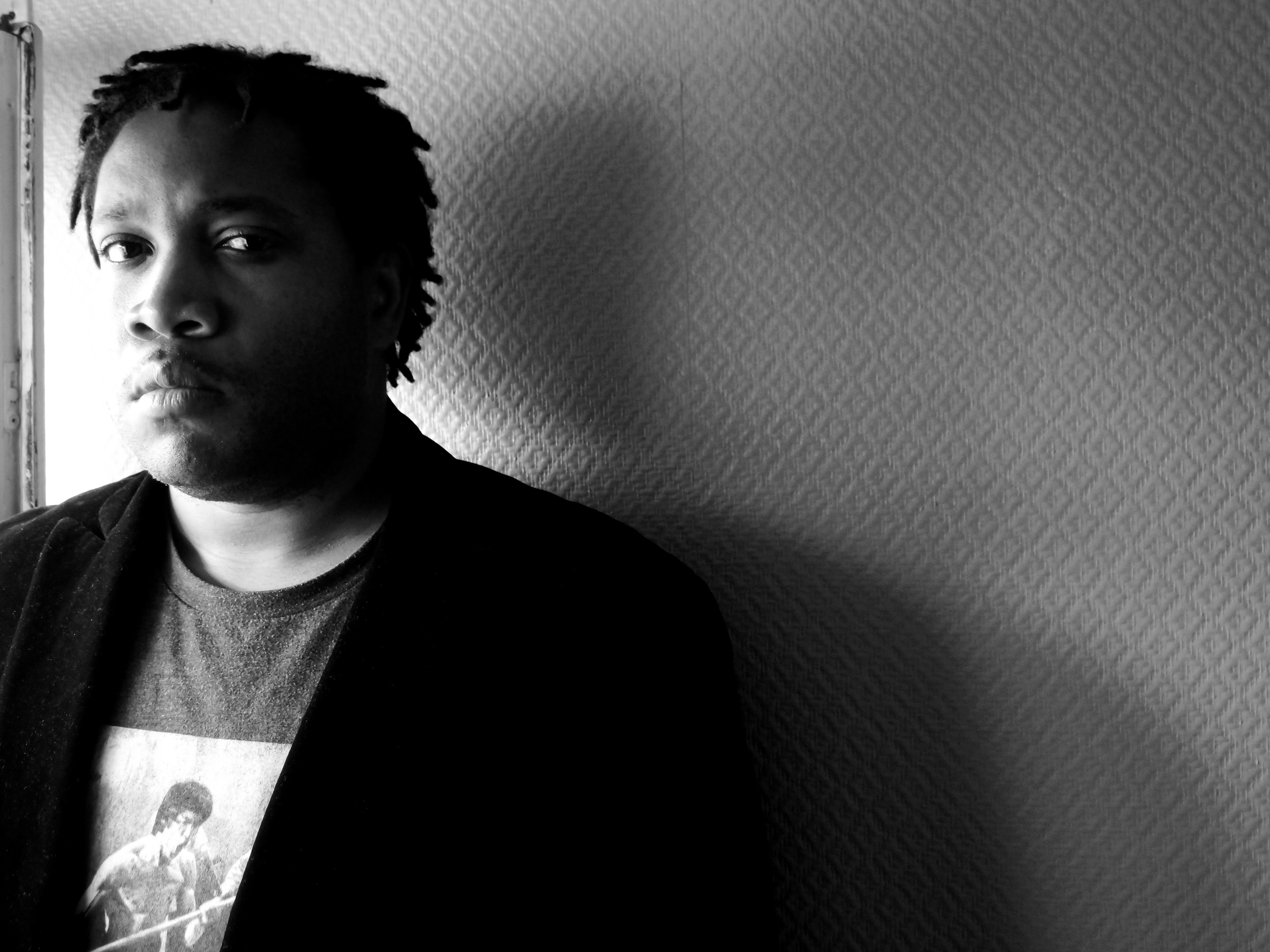
- Leron Thomas during his Parisian tour 2015

Background information
- Born: April 8, 1979 (age 47)
- Origin: Houston, Texas
- Genres: Jazz, electropop, funk, rock
- Occupations: Composer, Trumpeter, Singer-Songwriter, Producer
- Instrument: Trumpet
- Years active: 2000 – present
- Label: Heavenly Sweetness

Leron Thomas (born April 8, 1979) is an American jazz trumpeter, composer and vocalist noted for his musical style as a "masterful genre-bender". Born in Houston, Texas Thomas attended the High School for the Performing and Visual Arts. He moved to New York City to study Jazz and Contemporary Music at The New School university. There he studied alongside many notable contemporaries and began working professionally prior to his graduation in 2003. He went the 2019 Grammys awards ceremony and watched his fellow classmate win. Thomas is also a rapper under the alias Pan Amsterdam.

== Career ==
=== 2000-2005 ===
Performing live with Billy Harper, Thomas also recorded with Bilal. In 2001, upon the release of Bilal's 1st Born Second album Thomas toured as a member of Bilal's band on Erykah Badu's Mama's Gun World Tour, and the subsequent touring in the US, Europe and Asia. He recorded with Dennis Ferrer in 2002 and played live alongside Roy Hargrove at The Trumpet Shall Sound series at the Jazz Gallery in New York. Prior to graduation in 2003, he was recorded as a sideman for Seven Heads and Velour Recordings. Noted as a "promising new arrival" on the trumpet, Thomas played live as a band leader and within Charles Tolliver's big band.

Thomas began to stray from composing and playing specifically within the genre of jazz. In 2004 the New York Times described the beginning of his change in musical style; "he has rethought his music lately, changing his band and adding rhythmic and harmonic complexities" Thomas continued to work with Bilal, recording his Love for Sale album, and performed live as a member of the Lauryn Hill band. Thomas formally introduced his new music as 'other music' in a live performance at Joe's Pub yet he continued to also compose and perform straight-ahead jazz. Dave Douglas mentioned Thomas "has a huge sound and writes fantastic material. Sensitive and subtle, but also with the power to communicate great tenderness and loss" when promoting his live performance in the Festival of New Trumpet Music. Thomas recorded with guitarist Craig Magnano and released his first independent album, Dirty Draws Vol. 1 drawing the attention of the New York Times; "intelligent, casual, a little nuts and completely entertaining".

=== 2006-2010 ===
Thomas recorded his follow-up album with Magnano, Dirty Draws Vol. 2. Playing in a double bill, Thomas performed his multi-genre music alongside Christian Scott at Joe's Pub. Thomas regularly performed with his band at a variety of rock clubs, dive bars and jazz clubs in New York until 2009 when he grew tired of convincing booking agents that his diverse musical style was fitting for their venue. During 2007 Thomas featured as a special guest at the National Jazz Museum in Harlem where he worked with children alongside host, Loren Schoenberg. Recording as a sideman with Waajeed, Thomas then recorded with Bobby Watson, his release From The Heart features the track Marcus Vein composed by Thomas. As a member of Watson's touring band he received praise in Europe and the USA; "Thomas' trumpet solo is inspired and his duet work with Watson is in perfect sync". Thomas appeared on the 88-Keys album The Death of Adam alongside Kanye West and also on Ultimate Breaks & Beats - Instrumentals in 2008.

The album Improvsensation was released independently in 2009 by Thomas after recording with guitarist Michael Severson. A 3 track EP followed named The Dodenhoff Session and was released as a free download on Amie Street. Thomas' composition In The Silence appeared on the soundtrack of the independent short film Cherry Blossom Season produced by Jefferson Moneo. In 2010 Thomas performed live with Bilal in South Africa and released two new independent recordings of his own, Around You; a jazz instrumental project and Juxtaposed; an "utterly creative, if not partially bizarre, venture into the inventive mind of a masterful genre-bender". Moneo's next short film featured Thomas as a credited cast member as he plays “a down and out trumpet player in New York City that suffers numerous humiliations on the way to personal redemption.” Around this time he began receiving attention for his composition Strange As It May Seem, that appeared on Dirty Draws Vol. 1 and featured the vocals of Bilal and Tiombe Lockhart.

=== 2011-2016 ===
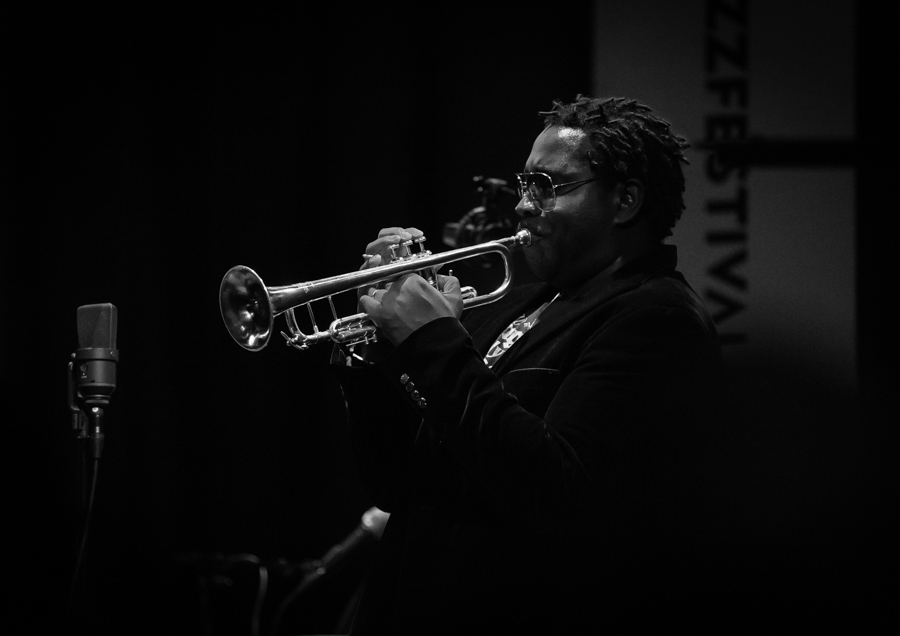
Thomas performing with Jason Moran at the 2015 Oslo Jazzfestival

Early 2011 Jason Moran invited Thomas to perform at 713 to 212: Houstonians in NYC, an event showcasing jazz musicians and singer-songwriters that originated from Houston, attended the High School for the Performing and Visual Arts and most of whom studied under the same teacher Robert Morgan. Thomas had previously paid homage to his teacher with his composition Doc Morgan and participated in the event, the New York Times reviewing his performance as "intermittently hilarious, his set fishtailed through jazz and rock and funk". Heroes of the Galleon Trade released Neptune's Last Stand on Golf Channel Recordings, the track Winter Island Romance co-written by Thomas, Chris Munoz and Michael Severson featured Thomas' vocals in a Barry White like delivery with subject matter that leaves listeners in disbelief. Mid-2011 Thomas performed with Moran and Meshell Ndegeocello in the “Fats Waller Dance Party: Small’s Paradise, paying tribute both to the spirit of Waller and to a club he played in Harlem. Following this, Thomas recorded with bassist Mark Kelley and independently released Dirty Draws Vol. 3, in his mixed genre style exhibited in the previous volumes.

Gaining attention on Australian radio station RRR, his ballad Love For Life featured on Triple R's Ennio Styles' compilation Stylin' 500 in 2011. DJ and musical tastemaker Gilles Peterson also began playing the track on BBC Radio. Contributing a composition, Thomas recorded his vocals alongside Gretchen Parlato in the ballad Leaves Rebirth that featured on the benefit album HOME, gift of music to aid in the Japan earthquake and tsunami relief, the track also gained radio play in the UK. Peterson also played Thomas' Mr. New York and later released the composition on his Brownswood Bubblers Eight in 2012. Thomas featured his live band (Taylor Eigsti, Ben Williams, Michael Veleanu, Dana Hawkins) at a Gilles Peterson event produced by Giant Step in New York.

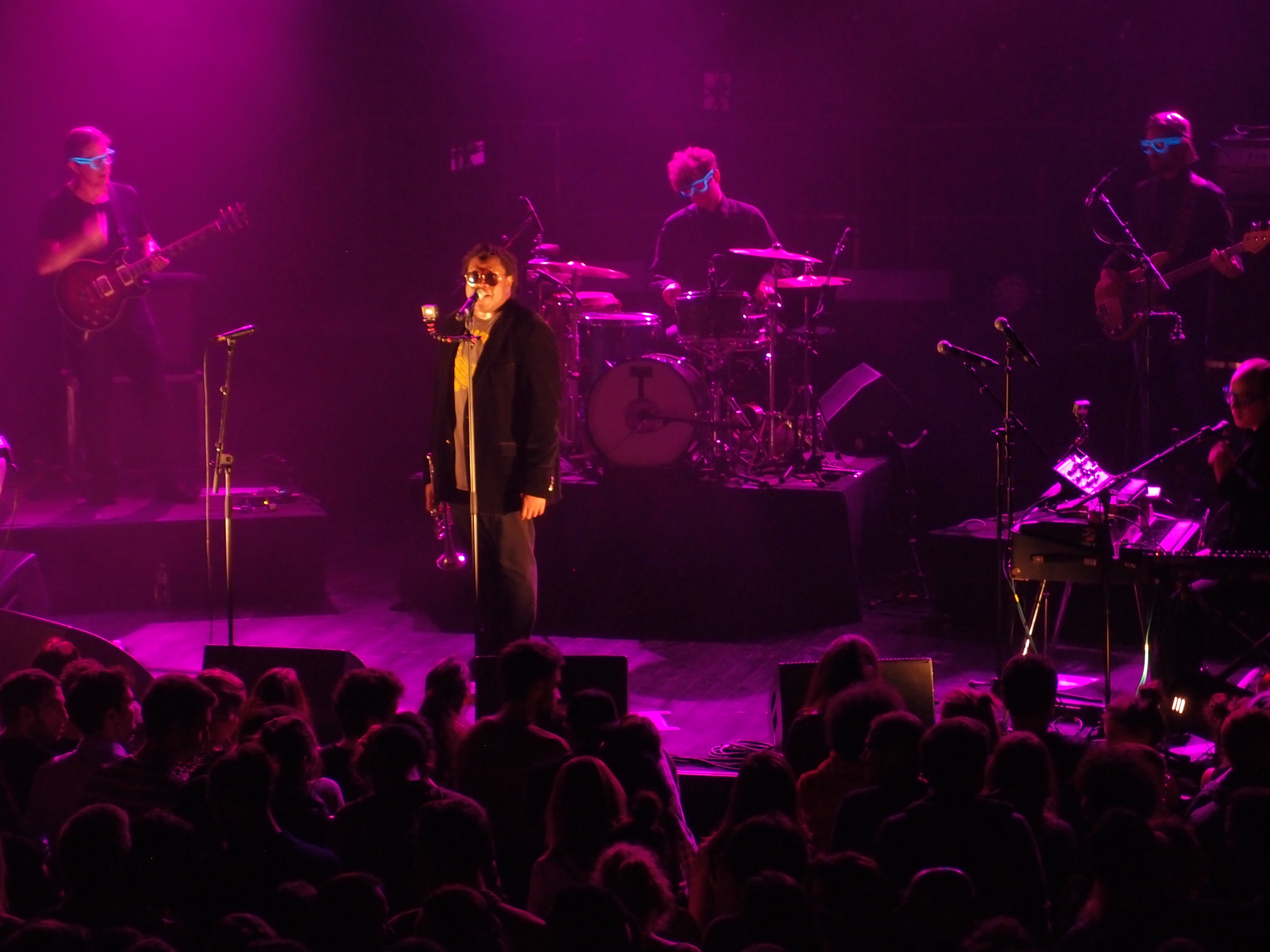
Thomas performing at Le Trianon, Paris 2015

Late 2012 Thomas began releasing mashup music videos that utilize found footage to promote new music from an upcoming release. After recording with Malik Ameer Crumpler, early 2013 Thomas released his eighth independent project titled ...Take It. He continued to create mash-up music video's and gained the attention of international blogs and magazines who favorably posted and reviewed his music videos. At the request of Gilles Peterson Leron Thomas recorded with Zara McFarlane and was well received live in London for the release of the first single 'Angie La La'. Thomas released his ninth independent project Whatever in September 2013, garnering much attention for his stellar line-up and straight ahead swing compositions and tone. Throughout 2013 Thomas also performed with Jason Moran's Fats Waller Dance Party in several states and at the Ottawa, Toronto and Montreal Jazz Festivals. Thomas contributed his "crowd-pleasing, elegantly delivered vocals" to Waller's Two Sleepy People. Thomas also appeared on Moran's Grammy nominated All Rise: A Joyful Elegy for Fats Waller album, released on Blue Note Records, well received as the "great crooner" with his "excellent vocals".

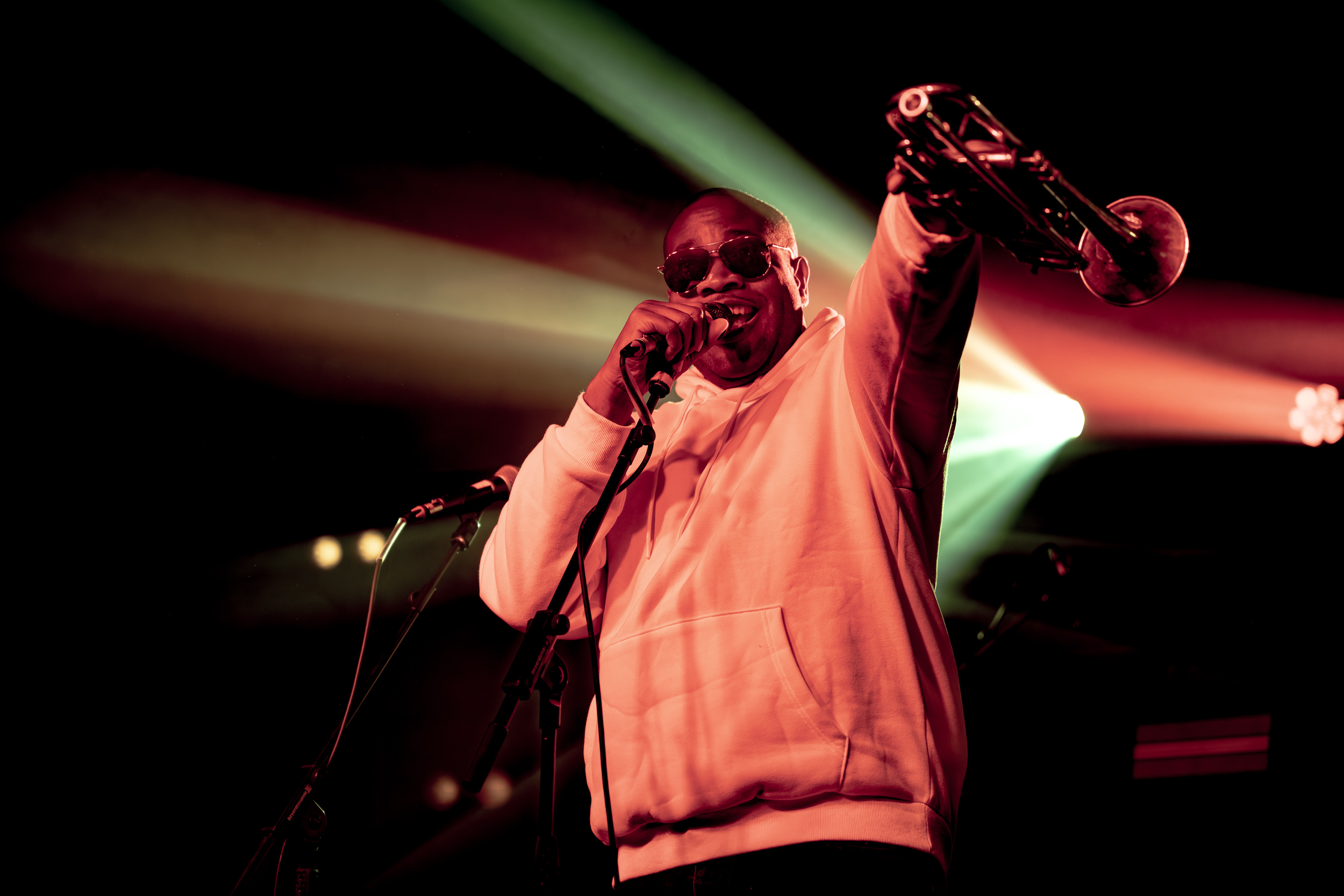
Thomas performing as Pan Amsterdam at The Great Escape Festival in 2025

Recording with French Producer GUTS on the Parisian Heavenly Sweetness label, Leron Thomas toured internationally with the GUTS live band, performing his hit song 'Man Funk'. The vinyl release of Thomas' experimental vocal/electronic ...Take It project through Belgium's On-Point Records was announced in September 2014. Thomas also continued to tour internationally with Jason Moran's Fats Waller Dance Party and Guts throughout 2015 while developing a new album of his own, to be released on the Heavenly Sweetness label. With a new version of Role Play recorded with Bilal on guest vocals, the track received global play by taste-maker DJ's prior to the single's release date. The full-length album titled Cliquish was released globally by Heavenly Sweetness October 2015 complete with a 2 LP vinyl release. Drawing attention for his eclectic style, this album was stylistically likened to George Clinton, TV On The Radio and N.E.R.D. Revered as Album Of The Week on BBC Radio 6, Gilles Peterson referred to Thomas as "a phenomenal talent" with a "brilliant album, really, really breaks the mold". Early 2016 Thomas touched on his Texan roots with the Joe Simon cover, The Chokin' Kind released on the Heavenly Sweetness Label. Leron Thomas tours with his live band throughout Europe promoting his new releases with his "alternative black music that sounds like no other".

== Style ==
The trumpet was Thomas' main instrument and his focus was composing jazz. As reported in an Australian radio interview, he became frustrated with the contemporary scene and began creating 'other' music, seemingly as "a hard left turn". The first song Thomas wrote lyrics to was Love for Life with the intention of having Bilal sing, however Bilal liked Thomas' vocals and said that he should sing it himself. Thomas' multi-genre writing style can be summarized as art rock, random, real, raw and honest while contributing to the jazz idiom with his "distinctive trumpet voice and compositional prowess", his jazz temperament evident throughout much of his music. Another significant element of Thomas' style is his humor and sometimes he leaves his listeners not knowing when he is joking. Thomas is known as a serious improviser, encompassing various styles of music including straight-ahead jazz, funk, singer-songwriter, R&B, indie-rock, country and rap. His tone on the trumpet has been referred to as pure, warm and broad, his vocals linked with raw emotion, at times with bedroom-eyed delivery in croons and yelps Thomas has mentioned many artists that offer him inspiration including Frank Zappa, David Bowie, George Clinton, James Brown, Wayne Shorter, Miles Davis, Herbie Nichols and Frankie Beverly.

== Recording ==
Thomas recorded with the following personnel:

- Dirty Draws Vol.1; Craig Magnano, Cris Conti, Bilal, Tiombe Lockhart, Derek Nievergelt, Harold O'Neal, Eric Harland, Marcus Strickland, Ryan Berg, Rashaan Carter.
- Dirty Draws Vol.2; Brandon Owens, Craig Magnano, Benji, Darren Beckett, Stacy Dillard, Emannuel Harold, Ryan Berg, Isaac Darsche, Jeremy 'Bean' Clemons,
- Improvsensation: Michael Severson, Craig Magnano, Jamire Williams
- The Dodenhoff Session: Michael Severson, Tom Deis, Erik Dodenhoff, Tom Roslak
- Around You: Frank LoCrasto, Jamire Williams, Burniss Earl Travis, Lage Lund
- Juxtaposed; Axel Tosca Laugart, Amaury Acosta, Chris Smith, Aaron Nevezie, Theo Hill, Burniss Earl Travis, Tom Roslak, Frederika Krier, Bridget Barkan
- Dirty Draws Vol.3; Mark Kelley, Michael Valeanu, Justin Tyson, Shimrit Shoshan, Carlo De Rosa, Theo Hill, Jean Christophe Maillard, Egardo Yayo Serka
- ...Take It; Malik Crumpler Whatever; Taylor Eigsti, Harish Raghavan, Justin Brown, Eric Harland, Michael Valeanu, Matthew Stevens
- Role Play EP; Bilal, Simon Mavin, Paul Bender, Michael Severson, Florian Pellissier, Greg F, Tim Becherand, Tibo Brandalise, Matthew Silberman, Malik Crumpler
- Cliquish; Bilal, Simon Mavin, Paul Bender, Michael Severson, Florian Pellissier, Greg F, Tim Becherand, Tibo Brandalise, Matthew Silberman, Malik Crumpler, Kenny Ruby
- The Chokin' Kind; Florian Pellissier
- Good Kung Fu EP; Mr. Cue, Harish Raghavan, Taylor Eigsti

== Discography ==
=== Leron Thomas Recordings ===
- More Elevator Music (2020) (Double vinyl released on Lewis Recordings label)
- 120 Bpm Af (2017))
- Good Kung Fu EP (2016)
- The Chokin' Kind (2016) (Single Released on the Heavenly Sweetness label)
- Cliquish LP (2015) (Released on the Heavenly Sweetness label)
- Role Play EP (2015) (Released on the Heavenly Sweetness label)
- Whatever (2013)
- ...Take It (2013) (Released on vinyl in 2014 by Belgium's On Point Records)
- Dirty Draws Vol. 3 (2011)
- Juxtaposed (2010)
- Around You (2010)
- The Dodenhoff Session EP (free download on Amie Street 2009)
- Improvsensation (2009)
- Dirty Draws Vol. 2 (2006)
- Dirty Draws Vol. 1 (2005)

=== Feature Recordings ===
- GUTS - Eternal (Heavenly Sweetness, 2016)
- Florian Pellissier Quintet (Heavenly Sweetness, 2016) What a Difference a Day Makes featuring vocals by Leron Thomas
- Asagaya - Light Of The Dawn (Jakarta Records, 2015) Mountain Of Bliss featuring lyrics/vocals by Leron Thomas (trumpet/vocals also on additional tracks)
- Jason Moran - All Rise: A Joyful Elegy for Fats Waller (Blue Note Records, 2014) trumpet/vocals by Leron Thomas
- GUTS - Hip Hop After All (Heavenly Sweetness, 2014) Man Funk & Roses featuring lyrics/vocals by Leron Thomas
- Zara McFarlane - Angie La La (Brownswood Recordings, 2013) featuring lyrics/vocals by Leron Thomas
- Gilles Peterson Presents Brownswood Bubblers Eight (Brownswood Recordings, 2012) Mr. New York by Leron Thomas
- Home – Gift of Music (Sunnyside Records, 2012) Leaves Rebirth by Leron Thomas (featuring Gretchen Parlato)
- Heroes of the Galleon Trade - Neptune's Last Stand (Golf Channel Recordings, 2011) Winter Island Romance co-written by Leron Thomas, Chris Munoz & Michael Severson
- Ennio Styles - Stylin' 500 - Part 1: The Soul (Heard And Felt, 2011) Love For Life by Leron Thomas
- Tiombe Lockhart - Tiombe Lockhart #1 (Octave, 2007) Strange by Leron Thomas (featuring Tiombe Lockhart & Bilal)

=== Recordings as a Sideman ===
- Jason Moran - All Rise: A Joyful Elegy for Fats Waller (Blue Note, 2014)
- Bobby Watson - From The Heart (Palmetto Records, 2008)
- 88-Keys - The Death of Adam (Decon, 2008)
- Ultimate Breaks & Beats - Instrumentals (Traffic Entertainment Group, 2008)
- Waajeed Production Mix CD: Re-Edits, Re-Fixes & Re-Mixes (Bling47 Recordings, 2007)
- Tiombe Lockhart (Giant Step Records, 2005) Mr. Johnnie Walker
- Bilal - Love for Sale (unreleased)
- Soulive (Velour Recordings, 2003) Doin Something (Remix)
- 7 Heads R Better Than 1: No Edge-Ups In South Africa Vol. 1 (Seven Heads, 2003) Bosoms
- Dennis Ferrer - Soul Collectives Vol. 3 (Large Records, 2002)
- Bilal - 1st Born Second (Interscope Records, 2001)
