= Into the Silence (Avishai Cohen album) =

2016 studio album by trumpeter Avishai Cohen

Studio album by Avishai Cohen
- Released: January 29, 2016
- Recorded: July 2015
- Studios: Studios La Buissonne, Pernes-les-Fontaines, France
- Genre: Jazz
- Length: 53:05
- Labels: ECM; ECM 2482
- Producer: Manfred Eicher

Avishai Cohen chronology
Dark Nights (2014)	Into the Silence (2016)	Cross My Palm with Silver (2017)

Into the Silence is an album by Israeli trumpeter and composer Avishai Cohen recorded in France in 2015 and released on the ECM label the following year.

== Reception ==
Professional ratings
Review scores
Source	Rating
Allmusic	4/5 stars
The Guardian	5/5 stars
All About Jazz	4/5 stars
DownBeat	4/5 stars

The AllMusic review by Matt Collar notes "In some ways, Cohen's move toward a more classical, ambient sound makes sense, as he is recording material specifically with the ECM stylistic tradition in mind. Sadly, Cohen also composed these songs in the wake of his father's death, and the trumpeter's grief seems to permeate everything on Into the Silence ... with Cohen leading his band through ambient soundscapes that, much like one's emotions after the death of a loved one, are supple and sad one minute, and sharp and tangled the next".

In The Guardian, John Fordham wrote "The breadth of jazz references will make this irresistible for fans, but it’s beautiful contemporary music for just about anyone". In JazzTimes, Bill Beuttler wrote "Cohen assembled a new quintet for the project, and the music is more composed and introspective-the title track, in particular ... the five of them sound like they’ve been playing together forever".

All About Jazz reviewer Mark Sullivan stated "I have to wonder whether knowing the background of the inspiration for this music colors the perception of it—it seems unlikely that a listener encountering these tracks blind would guess what they were "about." It's beautiful music regardless, and clearly has a unity earned by the consistent spirit in the composing as well as the spontaneous approach that the group took to this performance".

== Track listing ==
All compositions by Avishai Cohen

1. "Life and Death" – 9:18
2. "Dream Like a Child" – 15:30
3. "Into the Silence" – 12:12
4. "Quiescence" – 5:10
5. "Behind the Broken Glass" – 8:12
6. "Life and Death (Epilogue)" – 2:43

== Personnel ==
- Avishai Cohen – trumpet
- Bill McHenry – tenor saxophone
- Yonathan Avishai – piano
- Eric Revis – double bass
- Nasheet Waits – drums
