= Avishai Cohen (trumpeter) =

Israeli jazz musician and composer (born 1978)

Avishai Cohen אבישי כהן
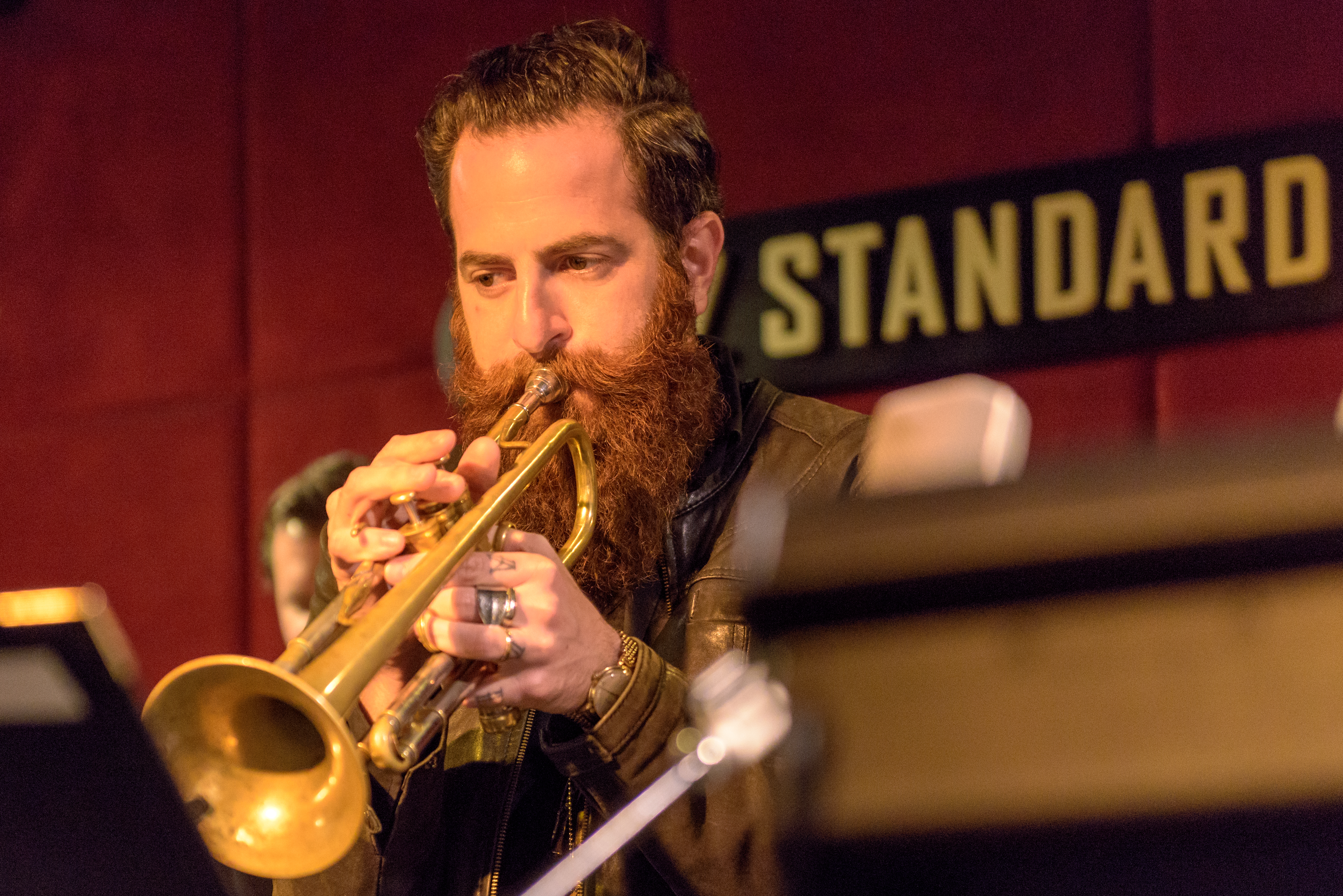
- Cohen with the SFJAZZ Collective in 2015

Background information
- Born: May 23, 1978 (age 47); Tel Aviv, Israel
- Genres: Jazz, post-bop, bebop
- Occupations: Musician, composer, bandleader
- Instrument: Trumpet
- Labels: ECM, Anzic, Fresh Sound
- Member of: SFJAZZ Collective, Lemon Juice Quartet, Third World Love, 3 Cohens, Triveni, Tea for 3
- Website: avishaicohenmusic.com
- Relatives: Anat Cohen, Yuval Cohen

Avishai Cohen (Hebrew: אבישי כהן; born May 23, 1978) is a New York City-based jazz musician and composer from Tel Aviv, Israel.

== Biography ==
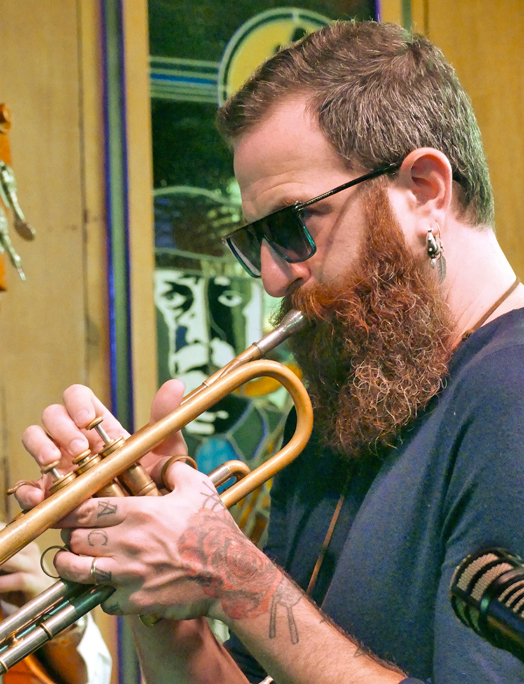
Avishai Cohen at Bach Dancing & Dynamite Society, Half Moon Bay, California, September 10, 2017

Cohen was born in Tel Aviv, Israel. He grew up in a musical family: his sister, Anat, played clarinet and his brother, Yuval, soprano saxophone. At the age of eight, Avishai asked his mother if he could begin taking trumpet lessons. At age ten, Avishai began playing with the Rimon School Big Band. He recalls, "I had a box I stood on." As a teenager Avishai toured with the Israeli Philharmonic Orchestra.

Avishai Cohen attended the Berklee College of Music in Boston, Massachusetts.

After graduating from Berklee, Cohen went on to win third place in the Thelonious Monk Institute of Jazz Trumpet Competition in 1997.

Cohen then moved to New York City, where he began developing his music alongside pianist Jason Lindner and bassist Omer Avital at Smalls Jazz Club.

Because he was frequently confused with named-alike bassist Avishai Cohen, he titled his 2003 debut album The Trumpet Player.

He has played with several jazz groups that include musicians from the SFJAZZ Collective. Cohen has stated that he was very heavily influenced by Miles Davis.

== Discography ==
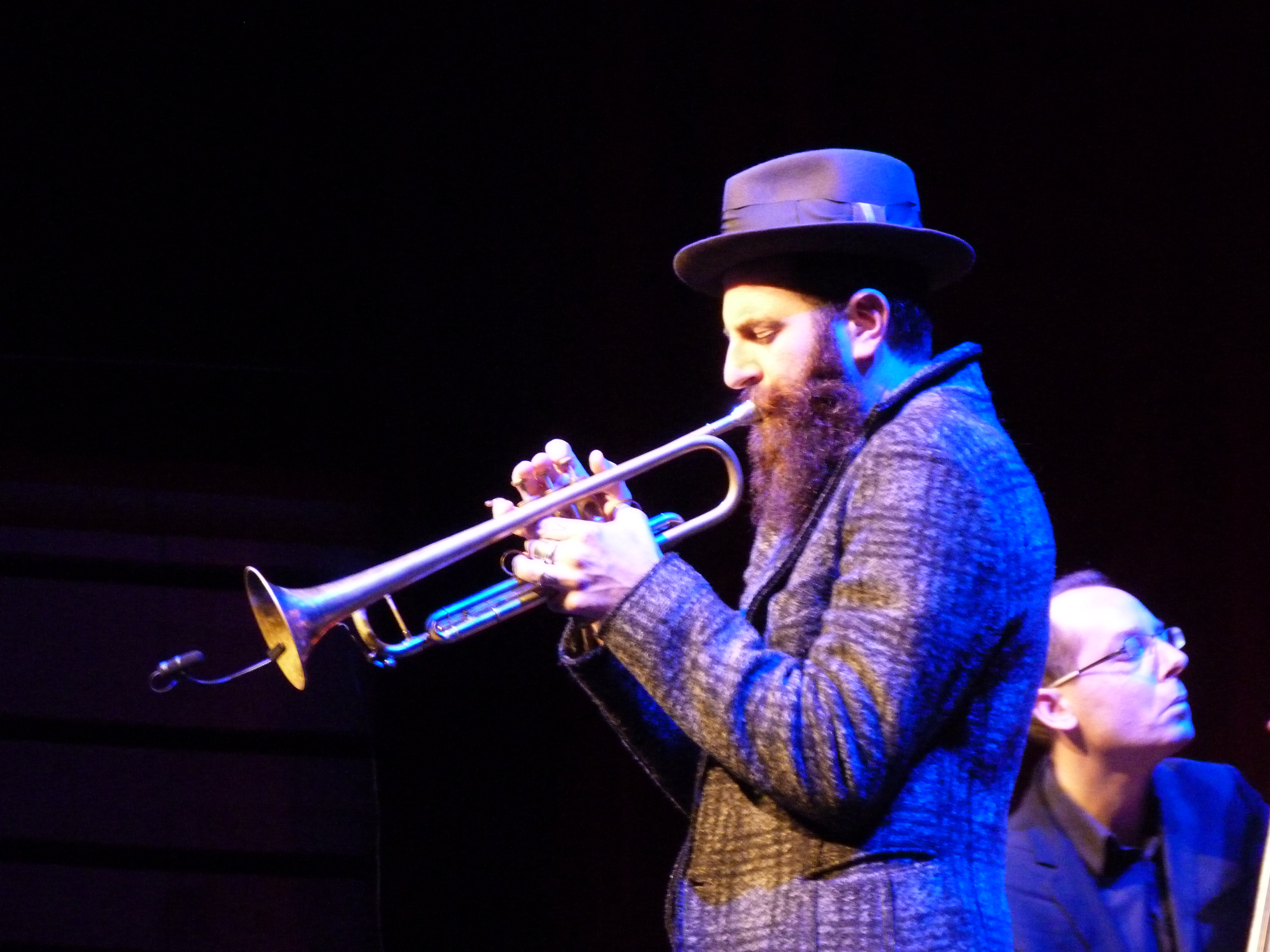
Avishai Cohen performing at WOMEX 15 in Budapest

=== As leader ===
- The Trumpet Player (Fresh Sound, 2003) – recorded in 2001
- After the Big Rain (Anzic, 2007) – recorded in 2006
- Flood (Anzic, 2008)
- Seven (Anzic, 2008)
- Introducing Triveni (Anzic, 2010)
- Triveni II (Anzic, 2012) – recorded in 2009
- Avishai Cohen's Triveni, Dark Nights (Anzic, 2014) – recorded in 2013
- Into the Silence (ECM, 2016) – recorded in 2015
- Cross My Palm with Silver (ECM, 2017) – recorded in 2016
- Playing the Room with Yonathan Avishai (ECM, 2019) – recorded in 2018
- Big Vicious (ECM, 2020) – recorded in 2019
- Naked Truth (ECM, 2022) – recorded in 2021
- Ashes to Gold (ECM, 2024) – recorded in 2023

=== As group ===
SFJAZZ Collective

- Live 2010: 7th Annual Concert Tour (SFJAZZ, 2010) [3CD]
- Live in New York 2011 - Season 8 - The Music of Stevie Wonder (SFJAZZ, 2011) [3CD]
- Live: SFJAZZ Center 2013 - The Music of Chick Corea (SFJAZZ, 2013) [2CD]
- Live: SFJAZZ Center 2014 - The Music of Joe Henderson (SFJAZZ, 2014) [2CD]
- 10th Anniversary: Best of - Live at the SFJAZZ Center 2013 (SFJAZZ, 2014)

Third World Love

- Third World Love Songs (Fresh Sound, 2002)
- Avanim (self-released, 2004) – also released from NMC Music
- Sketch of Tel Aviv (self-released, 2006) – also released from Smalls
- New Blues (Anzic, 2008)
- Songs and Portraits (Anzic, 2012)

3 Cohens
With Anat Cohen and Yuval Cohen

- One (Self, 2003)
- Braid (Anzic, 2007)
- Family (Anzic, 2011)
- Tightrope (Anzic, 2013)

With Omer Avital

- Marlon Browden Project (Fresh Sound, 2003)
- The Ancient Art of Giving (Smalls, 2006)
- Arrival (Fresh Sound, 2007)
- Free Forever (Smalls, 2011)
- Live at Smalls (SmallsLIVE, 2011)
- Suite of the East (Anzic, 2012)
- New Song (Motéma, 2014)

=== As sideman ===
With Keren Ann

- Nolita (Metro Blue/Blue Note, 2005)
- Keren Ann (EMI, 2007)

With Anat Cohen

- Place & Time (Anzic, 2005)
- Noir (Anzic, 2006)

With others

- Jason Lindner Big Band, Live at the Jazz Gallery (Anzic, 2007)
- Gregory Tardy, Monuments (SteepleChase, 2011)
- Mark Turner, Lathe of Heaven (ECM, 2014) – recorded in 2013
