= Charles Lyman Haynes =

American architect

Charles Lyman Haynes (1870–1947) was an American architect who designed a large number of buildings in Seattle during the early 20th century, including the Roy Vue. Born in Santa Cruz, California, Haynes arrived in Seattle in 1907.
