= Modernistic (album) =

Studio album by Jason Moran
- Released: September 10, 2002
- Recorded: April 12, 2002
- Studio: Systems Two, Brooklyn, NY
- Genre: Jazz
- Length: 42:35
- Label: Blue Note
- Producer: Jason Moran

Jason Moran chronology
Black Stars (2001)	Modernistic (2002)	The Bandwagon (2003)

Modernistic is the fourth album by Jason Moran and his first solo recording. It was released on the Blue Note label in 2002.

== Reception ==
Professional ratings
Review scores
Source	Rating
Allmusic	4/5 stars
The Penguin Guide to Jazz	3.5/4 stars

The AllMusic review by David R. Adler said "Jason Moran's fourth Blue Note album, a highly idiosyncratic solo piano venture, attempts to reconcile a staggeringly diverse set of influences into a cohesive artistic vision. ... Moran burns the rule book and presents something so thoroughly individual as to be practically without precedent. And still it comes across as a statement of love and respect for the jazz piano tradition".

All About Jazz reviewer Mark F. Turner stated, "Modernistic is Moran's first solo recording and it is truly dynamic. The talented pianist explores the unique intricacies of performing solo successfully ... Modernistic is an enjoyable and rewarding recording from one of today's brightest musicians".

The PopMatters review by Marshall Bowden noted "Moran has taken the thread of his own life as well as those of jazz music, African-Americans, and America itself and woven a remarkable and majestic tapestry that encompasses nearly every aspect of human emotion and aspiration".

== Track listing ==
All compositions by Jason Moran except where noted

1. "You've Got to Be Modernistic" (James P. Johnson) – 5:47
2. "Body and Soul" (Johnny Green, Frank Eyton, Edward Heyman, Robert Sour) – 3:46
3. "Planet Rock" (Arthur Baker, John Robie, Afrika Bambaataa, Soulsonic Force) – 5:46
4. "Planet Rock Postscript" – 2:01
5. "Time into Space into Time" (Muhal Richard Abrams) – 3:20
6. "Gangsterism on Irons" – 3:33
7. "Moran Tonk Circa 1936" – 4:15
8. "Passion" – 3:30
9. "Gangsterism on a Lunchtable" – 2:47
10. "Auf Einer Burg/In a Fortress" (Robert Schumann/Jason Moran) – 4:19
11. "Gentle Shifts South" – 3:31

== Personnel ==
- Jason Moran – piano, mini piano
