= In Session (Albert King and Stevie Ray Vaughan album) =

Live album by Albert King with Stevie Ray Vaughan
- Released: August 17, 1999
- Recorded: December 6, 1983
- Genre: Blues
- Length: 63:39
- Label: Stax
- Producer: Ian Anderson; Bill Belmont

Professional ratings
Review scores
Source	Rating
AllMusic	4.5/5 stars
The Penguin Guide to Blues Recordings	3/4 stars
USA Today	3/4 stars

In Session is a blues album by Albert King with Stevie Ray Vaughan recorded live for television on December 6, 1983, at CHCH-TV studios in Hamilton, Ontario, when Vaughan was 29 and King was 60. It was released as an album on August 17, 1999, and re-released with a supplemental video recording on DVD on September 28, 2010. It has also been released on CD and SACD.

It was the first of two collaborations captured for television, the second being as invited guests on a show led by B.B. King in 1987. It was recorded for one of a series of live television sessions recording the performances of various artists. The show was called In Session. The album includes a few short segments of the banter by King and Vaughan between songs.

Initially, King was not going to do the show as he did not know who Vaughan was. He did not realize that Vaughan was actually 'little Stevie', the 'skinny kid' that he let sit in when King played in Texas. King talks about this on one of the conversation tracks. When he realized who Vaughan was, he agreed to play.

The album's material is mostly King's concert line up, with one Vaughan cut, "Pride and Joy" on the audio CD (the DVD also features Vaughan's "Texas Flood"). King is 'driving' the session, but he features Vaughan's guitar extensively on most of the songs. According to the introductory credits on the DVD, a number of the tunes are included there for the first time, having been omitted from the original TV broadcast for reasons of time.

== Track listing ==
Audio CD:

1. "Call It Stormy Monday" (Aaron "T-Bone" Walker) - 8:59
2. "Old Times" [talk] - 1:15
3. "Pride and Joy" (Stevie Ray Vaughan) - 5:57
4. "Ask Me No Questions" (Albert King) - 5:02
5. "Pep Talk" [talk] - 0:51
6. "Blues at Sunrise" (Albert King) - 15:08
7. "Turn It Over" [talk] - 0:51
8. "Overall Junction" (Albert King) - 8:19
9. "Match Box Blues" (Blind Lemon Jefferson) - 7:38
10. "Who Is Stevie?" [talk] - 0:43
11. "Don't Lie to Me" (Hudson Whittaker) - 8:56

DVD:

1. [Introduction]
2. "Born Under a Bad Sign" *
3. "Texas Flood" (featuring Stevie Ray Vaughan on vocals) *
4. "Call It Stormy Monday"
5. "Old Times" [talk]
6. "Match Box Blues"
7. "Pep Talk" [talk]
8. "Don't Lie To Me"
9. "Who Is Stevie?" [talk]
10. "Pride and Joy" (featuring Stevie Ray Vaughan on vocals)
11. "I'm Gonna Move to the Outskirts of Town" *
12. [Outtro]

(* = not previously released/not on audio CD)

Based on the conversations, key changes and tempo count-offs, the tracks for the full performance were in the following order:

1. [Introduction]
2. "Born Under a Bad Sign"
3. "Texas Flood"
4. "Call It Stormy Monday"
5. "Old Times" [talk] [version from CD]
6. "Pride and Joy"
7. "Ask Me No Questions"
8. "Pep Talk" [talk]
9. "Blues at Sunrise"
10. "Turn It Over" [talk]
11. "Overall Junction"
12. "Match Box Blues"
13. "Who Is Stevie?" [talk]
14. "Don't Lie to Me"
15. "I'm Gonna Move to the Outskirts of Town"
16. [Outtro]

== Personnel ==
- Albert King - electric guitar, vocals
- Stevie Ray Vaughan - electric guitar, vocals on "Pride and Joy"
- Tony Llorens - piano, organ
- Gus Thornton - bass
- Michael Llorens - drums

Production

- Ian Anderson - original recordings
- Doug McClement - engineer
- Bill Belmont - producer
- Stephen Hart - remixing
- Chris Clough - reissue A&R
- Bill Belmont - reissue A&R
- George Horn - remastering

== Charts ==
Chart (1999)	Peak position
US Billboard 200	52
