= Charles Haynes (musician) =

- Also known as: Charles "Dogg" Haynes
- Born: Charles Haynes
- Origin: East St. Louis, Illinois, U.S.
- Education: Berklee College of Music (Class of 1999)
- Occupations: Drummer, record producer, musical director, percussionist
- Years active: 1990s–present

Charles Haynes (also known as Charles "Dogg" Haynes) is an American drummer, record producer, and musical director. He is recognized for his work as a percussionist and musical director for artists including Maxwell, Lady Gaga, and Ed Sheeran, and as the bandleader of the ensemble The Tabernacle.

== Early life and education ==
Haynes was raised in East St. Louis, Illinois, where he performed with the Lincoln High School Jazz Band. He graduated from Berklee College of Music in 1999. During his time in Boston, he became a frequent performer at Wally's Cafe and was a contemporary of notable musicians including trumpeter Roy Hargrove.

== Career ==
Haynes has worked extensively as a touring drummer and musical director. He was a member of Lady Gaga's band during The Monster Ball Tour and has toured or served as musical director for Ed Sheeran, Queen Latifah, and Kanye West.

In 2024, Haynes provided percussion for Maxwell's NPR Tiny Desk Concert, where his performance was noted for its "D.C. go-go flavor." As a bandleader, he directs The Tabernacle, an ensemble that debuted a series of "healing events" and Afrobeat-fusion performances in Boston in 2025.

In the jazz genre, Haynes has recorded and performed with Roy Hargrove, Marcus Strickland, Kenny Garrett, and Nicholas Payton. He is the proprietor of Herd Studios (Contrlroom) in Boston and contributed drums to Marcus Strickland's 2018 album People of the Sun released on Blue Note Records.
