= Marlon Jordan =

American jazz trumpeter (born 1970)

- Born: August 21, 1970 (age 55)
- Origin: New Orleans, Louisiana, U.S.
- Genres: Jazz; hard bop
- Occupations: Musician; composer; bandleader
- Instrument: Trumpet
- Years active: 1980s–present
- Label: Columbia
- Website: www.marlonjordanmusic.com
- Parent: Edward "Kidd" Jordan

Marlon Jordan (born August 21, 1970) is an American jazz trumpeter, composer, and bandleader.

== Early life ==
Marlon Jordan was born to a family of New Orleans musicians. He is the son of saxophonist Edward "Kidd" Jordan and classical pianist Edvidge Jordan and is brother to flutist Kent and sisters violinist Rachel and jazz singer Stephanie. While they have pursued separate careers, the family frequently collaborates. Marlon began playing trumpet in the fourth grade and graduated from the New Orleans Center for Creative Arts. He knew Wynton Marsalis (a major influence) and Terence Blanchard when he was a child. Marlon recorded as a sideman with his brother Kent (1987) and Dennis González (1988).

== Career ==
At age 18, Marlon recorded his debut album as a leader, For You Only (1988). On it, Branford Marsalis makes four appearances on tenor; Marlon's brother, flautist Kent Jordan, is heard on the opening "Jepetto's Despair", and there are two duets with bassist/pianist Elton Heron. Four standards, including "Cherokee" and "Stardust", are performed. Marlon took his quintet on the road, joined by Wynton Marsalis, Miles Davis, and George Benson as a headlining act in a series of JVC Jazz Festival dates. They also played in some of the country's top jazz clubs, including the Blue Note and the Ritz, as well as in concerts ranging from New York's Avery Fisher Hall to Binghamton University.

Marlon's fifth album, You Don’t Know What Love Is (2005), features his sister Stephanie Jordan (winner of the "Billie Holiday Competition" for Jazz vocalist) singing on five of the album's eight tracks. Marlon is also joined here by his father Edward Jordan, sister Rachel (violinist with the Louisiana Philharmonic Orchestra), and brother Kent Jordan on flute. His uncle, Alvin Batiste, clarinet; cousin Jonathan Bloom, percussion; uncle Maynard Chatters, trombone; and Chatters's son, Mark, trumpet. They all come together for interpretations of eight jazz standards, in a New Orleans vibe. Track listing: "My Favorite Things"; "All Blues"; "You Don’t Know What Love Is"; "Joey"; "Flamingo"; "Portrait"; "You Leave Me Breathless"; "Now Baby", and "Or Never".

Marlon and sister Stephanie during the fall of 2005 as Jazz Ambassadors on a European Tour as part of the Higher Ground Relief effort sponsored by the U.S. Department of State, and Jazz at Lincoln Center to thank the people of Europe for their support of New Orleans and the Gulf Region following Hurricane Katrina. The countries included Bucharest, Germany, Lithuania and Ukraine.

== Discography ==
Year	Title	Genre	Label	Billboard
1988	For You Only	Jazz, Hard Bop	Columbia	#7
1991	Learson's Return	Jazz, Hard Bop	Columbia	#9
1992	The Undaunted	Jazz, Hard Bop	Columbia	
1997	Marlon's Mode	Jazz, Hard Bop	Arabesque	
2005	You Don't Know What Love Is w/Stephanie Jordan	Jazz, Hard Bop	Louisiana Red Hot	
