= Vanished Gardens =

Vanished Garden

Studio album by Charles Lloyd, The Marvels, and Lucinda Williams
- Released: June 29, 2018
- Studio: EastWest (Hollywood, California)
- Genre: Jazz
- Length: 73:37
- Language: English
- Label: Blue Note
- Producer: Dorothy Darr; Charles Lloyd; Don Was; Lucinda Williams

Charles Lloyd chronology
Passin' Thru (2017)	Vanished Garden (2018)	8: Kindred Spirits (Live from the Lobero) (2020)

Lucinda Williams chronology
This Sweet Old World (2017)	Vanished Garden (2018)	Good Souls Better Angels (2020)

Vanished Gardens is a studio album made in collaboration between jazz saxophonist Charles Lloyd, the backing band The Marvels, and roots music singer-songwriter Lucinda Williams, released on June 29, 2018, by Blue Note Records. The album has received positive critical reception.

== Critical reception ==
Professional ratings
Aggregate scores
Source	Rating
Metacritic	80/100
Review scores
Source	Rating
AllMusic	3.5/5 stars
The Guardian	4/5 stars
PopMatters	8/10
Rolling Stone	3.5/5 stars

According to the review aggregator Metacritic, Vanished Gardens received "generally favorable reviews" based on a weighted average score of 80 out of 100 from eight critic scores. The editorial staff of AllMusic Guide gave the release 3.5 out of five stars, with reviewer Thom Jurek praising the performance: "they create a music that draws on the sum total of experience and shared emotion". In Rolling Stone, Hank Shteamer gave the same score, noting the "savvy stylistic blend", summing up, "As diverse as the material here is, there’s no sense that Lloyd is putting on different hats. Like his career as a whole, Vanished Gardens shows how the many currents of American music all flow into a single stream." NPR's Nate Chinen found emotional resonance in the collaboration, with Lloyd and Williams "open[ing] windows to each other's souls".

Will Layman of PopMatters situated the recording in Lloyd's musical evolution, as part of his exploration of Americana, with praise for the instrumentals but a special attention to the five vocals tracks where Williams appears. Writing for All About Jazz, Mike Jurkovic gave the album 4.5 out of five stars, with positive assessments of each track, noting the competing lyrical content of mortality and hope. Neil Spencer of The Guardian calls the collaboration an "odd couple" considering the musicians' distinct backgrounds but writes that "this unexpected collaboration doesn’t miss a trick"; he gave it four out of five stars. The Associated Press' Pablo Gorondi also noted the blending of styles, calling this "a dynamic ensemble’s testament to creativity, musicianship and independence" and in The Boston Globe, Jon Garelick emphasized the somber tone of the music and the uplifting benediction of the musicians' cover of "Angel".

=== Accolades ===
Accolades for Vanished Gardens
Publication	Accolade	Rank	Ref.
The Bitter Southerner	The Bitter Southerner's Top 30 Southern Albums of 2018	21	

== Track listing ==
Credits adapted from the album's liner notes.

No.	Title	Writer(s)	Length
1.	"Defiant"	Charles Lloyd	8:44
2.	"Dust"	Lucinda Williams	8:00
3.	"Vanished Gardens"	Lloyd	9:05
4.	"Ventura"	Williams	6:24
5.	"Ballad of the Sad Young Men"	Fran Landesman; Tommy Wolf	6:19
6.	"We've Come Too Far to Turn Around"	Williams	6:32
7.	"Blues for Langston and LaRue"	Lloyd	5:40
8.	"Unsuffer Me"	Williams	11:42
9.	"Monk's Mood"	Thelonious Monk	5:18
10.	"Angel"	Jimi Hendrix	5:53
Total length:			73:37

== Personnel ==
Charles Lloyd & The Marvels

- Charles Lloyd – alto flute, tenor saxophone, vocals, band leader, production
- Bill Frisell – guitar
- Eric Harland – drums
- Greg Leisz – dobro, pedal steel guitar
- Reuben Rogers – double bass
- Lucinda Williams – vocals

Additional personnel

- Dorothy Darr – art design, photography, production
- Will Delaney – assistant engineering
- Bernie Grundman – mastering
- Joe Harley – poetry
- Paul Moore – layout
- Michael C. Ross – engineering, mixing
- Tyler Shields – assistant engineering
- Don Was – production

== Charts ==
Chart (2018)	Peak position
US Jazz Albums (Billboard)	3
US Traditional Jazz Albums (Billboard)	2
US Tastemakers (Billboard)	18

== See also ==
- List of 2018 albums
