= Heinrich Schultz =

Estonian festival organizer

Heinrich Schultz (misspelled also Heinrich Schults; 23 September 1924 – 1 October 2012) was an Estonian cultural functionary, the organizer of international jazz festivals in Tallinn.

== Early life and war ==
Schultz was born in Valga, Estonia, the son of a Baltic German father and a Russian mother.

During World War II Heinrich Schultz served in the 8th Estonian Rifle Corps of the Red Army as a company clerk. He was awarded Order of Glory, 3rd class (1944), Order of the Patriotic War, 2nd class (1985) and several medals for his war efforts.

== Jazz festivals ==
From 1961 to 1967, as head of the Cultural Department at the Tallinn Executive Committee of the Council of Workers’ Deputies (now Cultural Heritage Department at the Tallinn City Government), he also organized international jazz festivals, dance competitions and other cultural events. The largest and most acclaimed of them, Tallinn International Jazz Festival "Tallinn '67" took place in May 1967, featuring the renowned Charles Lloyd Quartet from the United States. In addition, jazz groups from Estonia, Latvia, Lithuania, Russia, Ukraine, Azerbaijan, Georgia, Sweden (Arne Domnérus' Sextet with Jan Johansson at the piano), Finland and Poland participated.

The event received considerable international and domestic media attention and frightened the then Soviet authorities to the extent that jazz festivals were prohibited as a perceived threat to the existing communist ideology. The ruling Communist Party officials selected Heinrich Schultz as a scapegoat for organising the festival and he was subsequently dismissed from his position as head of the Cultural Department.

== Perestroika ==
In the decades to follow, Heinrich Schultz lived in anonymity, banned to take positions of authority. Since the time of perestroika and Estonia's regained independence 1991, many media references have been made about his contribution to jazz festivals as unique cultural encounters between Soviet Union/Estonia and West during the Cold War period.

== Death ==
Heinrich Schultz died in Tallinn, Estonia.

== LP album ==
- Charles Lloyd in the Soviet Union: Recorded at the Tallinn Jazz Festival. New York: Atlantic, 1970 (George Avakian in his cover text refers to Henry Schults (=Heinrich Schultz) as festival chairman).

== Documentary ==
- Eesti Kroonika [=Estonian Chronicle] No. 21, 1990 (a Tallinnfilm movie studio newsreel where Heinrich Schultz recollects the international jazz festival in Tallinn, 1967). (In Estonian)

== Books ==
- Heli Reimann. Tallinn '67 Jazz Festival: Myths and Memories. New York and London: Routledge, 2022. 194 pp.
- Valter Ojakäär. Sirp ja saksofon [=Sickle and Saxophone]. Tallinn: Ilo, 2008, pp. 348–369 (photo on p. 369: Charles Lloyd and Heinrich Schultz on stage during the 1967 jazz festival). (Book in Estonian)
