= Athens Concert =

Live album by Charles Lloyd and Maria Farantouri
- Released: 2011
- Recorded: June 2010
- Venues: Herod Atticus Odeon; Athens, Greece
- Genre: Jazz
- Length: 87:04
- Labels: ECM; ECM 2205/06
- Producers: Dorothy Darr, Manfred Eicher

Charles Lloyd chronology
Mirror (2010)	Athens Concert (2011)	Hagar's Song (2013)

Athens Concert is a live album by jazz saxophonist Charles Lloyd and his quartet with Greek singer Maria Farantouri, recorded in June 2010 and released on ECM the following year.

== Reception ==
The AllMusic review by Thom Jurek awarded the album 4 1/2 stars and states "The Athens Concert is truly inspirational and quite a watermark in a career full of them for Lloyd."

Professional ratings
Review scores
Source	Rating
Allmusic	4.5/5 stars
The Guardian	4/5 stars

== Track listing ==
All compositions by Charles Lloyd except as indicated

Disc One:

1. "Kratissa Ti Zoi Mou" (Mikis Theodorakis) - 5:59
2. "Dream Weaver" - 8:10
3. "Blow Wind" - 5:34
4. "Requiem" (Agathi Dimitrouka, Lloyd) - 5:57
5. "Greek Suite Part 1: Hymnos Stin Ayia Triada" - (Traditional) - 4:03
6. "Greek Suite Part 1: Epano Sto Xero Homa" (Theodorakis) - 2:52
7. "Greek Suite Part 1: Messa Stous Paradissious Kipous" (Theodorakis) - 4:49
8. "Taxidi Sta Kythera" (Eleni Karaindrou) - 4:35

Disc Two:

1. "Prayer" - 7:58
2. "Greek Suite Part 2: Vlefaro Mou" (Nikos Kypourgos, Lina Nikolakopoulou) - 3:32
3. "Greek Suite Part 2: Margaritarenia" (Traditional) - 1:29
4. "Greek Suite Part 2: Thalassaki Mou" (Traditional) - 2:57
5. "Greek Suite Part 3: Epirotiko Meroloi" (Traditional) - 6:28
6. "Greek Suite Part 3: Kægomæ Kæ Sigoliono" (Traditional) - 5:00
7. "Greek Suite Part 3: Mori Kontoula Lemonia" (Traditional) - 2:40
8. "Greek Suite Part 3: AlismonoKæ Hæromæ" (Traditional) - 3:06
9. "Greek Suite Part 3: Tou Hel'To Kastron" (Traditional) - 4:28
10. "Yanni Mou" (Traditional) - 7:27

== Personnel ==
- Charles Lloyd - tenor saxophone, alto flute, tarogato
- Maria Farantouri - voice
- Jason Moran - piano
- Reuben Rogers - bass
- Eric Harland - drums
- Socratis Sinopoulos - lyra
- Takis Farazis - piano
