= Tone Poems =

Tone Poems may refer to:

- Symphonic poem, a form of orchestral composition
- 3 Tondikter (3 Tone Poems), by Wilhelm Peterson-Berger
- Tone poems (Strauss), group of works by Richard Strauss
- Three Tone Poems, by Charles Tomlinson Griffes
- Tone Poems, by Michael Glenn Williams
- Tone Poems (album), by Dave Grisman and Tony Rice
- Tone Poem (album), a 2021 album by Charles Lloyd
