= Rabo de Nube =

Live album by the Charles Lloyd Quartet
- Released: March 11, 2008
- Recorded: April 27, 2007
- Venue: Basel, Switzerland
- Genre: Jazz
- Label: ECM; ECM 2053
- Producer: Charles Lloyd, Dorothy Darr

Charles Lloyd chronology
Sangam (2006)	Rabo de Nube (2008)	Mirror (2010)

Rabo de Nube is a live album by the Charles Lloyd Quartet recorded in Basel on April 27, 2007, and released on ECM the following year. The quartet also includes pianist Jason Moran, bassist Reuben Rogers and drummer Eric Harland.

== Reception ==
The AllMusic review by Thom Jurek awarded the album 4 stars and states "the band takes a very different approach to some familiar tunes ... Ultimately, Rabo de Nube is yet another essential Lloyd offering from ECM. His sense of adventure is greater than ever, and his embrace of the tradition is equaled by his willingness to stretch it, bend it, turn it every which way but break it ... Lloyd shows no signs of slowing down or simple contentment as he ages, and we are all the more fortunate for it."

Professional ratings
Review scores
Source	Rating
Allmusic	4/5 stars
The Penguin Guide to Jazz Recordings	4/4 stars

== Track listing ==
All compositions by Charles Lloyd except as indicated

1. "Prometheus" – 14:42
2. "Migration of Spirit" – 10:14
3. "Booker's Garden" – 14:32
4. "Ramanujan" – 11:38
5. "La Colline de Monk" – 4:01
6. "Sweet Georgia Bright" – 12:16
7. "Rabo de Nube" (Silvio Rodríguez) – 7:36

== Personnel ==
- Charles Lloyd – tenor saxophone, alto flute, tarogato
- Jason Moran – piano
- Reuben Rogers – bass
- Eric Harland – drums
- Manfred Eicher – executive producer
