= Lift Every Voice (Charles Lloyd album) =

Studio album by Charles Lloyd
- Released: October 21, 2002
- Recorded: February 2002
- Genre: Jazz
- Length: 130:46
- Label: ECM; ECM 1832/33
- Producer: Charles Lloyd, Dorothy Darr

Charles Lloyd chronology
Hyperion with Higgins (2001)	Lift Every Voice (2002)	Which Way is East (2004)

Lift Every Voice is an album by jazz saxophonist Charles Lloyd, recorded in February 2002 and released on ECM October that same year. The quintet features rhythm section Geri Allen, John Abercrombie, Marc Johnson & Larry Grenadier (alternately) and Billy Hart. The album represents Lloyd's response to the 9/11 terrorist attacks.

== Reception ==
Professional ratings
Review scores
Source	Rating
AllMusic	4.5/5 stars
The Penguin Guide to Jazz Recordings	3/4 stars
Tom Hull	B+

The album received wide critical acclaim. The AllMusic review by Richard S. Ginell awarded the album 4½ stars and states "The result is one of the most unusual and deeply spiritual recordings in Lloyd's always-unusual career, one that says more with fewer means."

The All About Jazz review by Mark Corroto stated "Lloyd’s belief in humanity and reliance on the healing and redemptive qualities of music propels this compassionate recording."

== Track listing ==
All compositions by Charles Lloyd except as indicated.

Disc one
No.	Title	Writer(s)	Length
1.	"Hymn to the Mother"		15:00
2.	"You Are So Beautiful"	Bruce Fisher, Billy Preston	4:05
3.	"Amazing Grace"	John Newton	4:46
4.	"East Virginia, West Memphis"		9:40
5.	"What's Going On"	Renaldo "Obie" Benson, Al Cleveland, Marvin Gaye	5:09
6.	"Angel Oak"		3:35
7.	"Te Amaré"	Silvio Rodríguez	6:49
8.	"I'm Afraid"	Duke Ellington	7:41
9.	"Hafez, Shattered Heart"		4:43

Disc two
No.	Title	Writer(s)	Length
1.	"Rabo de nube"	Rodríguez	7:07
2.	"Blood Count"	Billy Strayhorn	5:08
3.	"Go Down Moses"	Traditional	10:39
4.	"Beyond Darkness"		7:51
5.	"Nocturne"		6:13
6.	"Wayfaring Stranger"	Traditional	8:40
7.	"Deep River"	Traditional	6:27
8.	"Lift Every Voice and Sing"	James Weldon Johnson, John Rosamond Johnson	3:10
9.	"Prayer, the Crossing"		14:03

== Personnel ==
- Charles Lloyd – tenor saxophone, flute, tarogato
- Geri Allen – piano
- John Abercrombie – guitar
- Marc Johnson – double bass (CD1 #1, 3-7; CD2 #1, 3, 5, 9)
- Larry Grenadier – double bass (CD1 #2, 8; CD2 #2, 4-8)
- Billy Hart – drums
