= Autumn in New York =

Autumn in New York may refer to:

- "Autumn in New York" (song), a jazz standard composed by Vernon Duke in 1934
- Autumn in New York (film), a 2000 film directed by Joan Chen
- Autumn in New York (Kenny Barron album), 1986
- Autumn in New York (Tal Farlow album), 1954
- Autumn in New York (Charles Lloyd album), 1979
- Autumn in New York (Jo Stafford album), 1950
