= Which Way Is East =

Studio album by Charles Lloyd & Billy Higgins
- Released: March 30, 2004
- Recorded: January 2001
- Genre: Jazz
- Length: 150:49
- Label: ECM
- Producer: Charles Lloyd, Dorothy Darr

Charles Lloyd chronology
Lift Every Voice (2002)	Which Way Is East (2004)	Jumping the Creek (2005)

Which Way Is East is a double-album of duets by jazz saxophonist Charles Lloyd and percussionist Billy Higgins recorded in January 2001 and released on ECM in March 2004. The album contains the last recordings by Higgins before he died in May 2001.

== Reception ==
In his "Jazz Consumer Guide" for The Village Voice, Tom Hull summarized the album as "two old friends converse, contemplate, fart around." In another commentary published on his website, he said of the recording: "Similar types of things have been done elsewhere—Bill Cole and Kali Fasteau are two who regularly work along these lines, but their records feel more like work, this one feels more like play, and its homespun nature puts it over the top."

The AllMusic review by Thom Jurek awarded the album 4½ stars stating, "there is crackling energy, humor, warmth, and a complete commitment to expressing what may indeed be beyond real expression. Not since John Coltrane and Rashied Ali's Interstellar Space—though they sound nothing alike—has a duet recording of such unfettered communication. Highly recommended."

The All About Jazz review by John Kelman stated, "While Higgins' passing, at the relatively young age of sixty-five, was tragic, we should feel fortunate that Lloyd had the foresight to bring him to his home in January 2001, for this series of impromptu, intimate and ultimately revealing duets." Other professional reviews for the same website were also highly favourable with Mark F. Turner stating "the music is a wondrous journey on many levels. Fervently recommended." Mark Corroto stated, "The last recording by Higgins is worth savoring."

Professional ratings
Review scores
Source	Rating
AllMusic	4.5/5 stars
Tom Hull	A−
The Penguin Guide to Jazz Recordings	3/4 stars

== Track listing ==
All compositions by Charles Lloyd except as indicated

1. "What Is Man: The Forest" (Higgins, Lloyd) - 3:34
2. "What Is Man: Being and Becoming" - 4:45
3. "What Is Man: Civilization" - 4:35
4. "What Is Man: Sea of Tranquility" - 2:43
5. "Divans: Prayer, Sanctuary" - 4:12
6. "Divans: Supreme Love Dance" - 3:36
7. "Divans: A Wild and Holy Band" - 3:53
8. "Salaam: Oh, Karim" (Higgins) - 2:30
9. "Salaam: Akhi" - 5:59
10. "Salaam: Ya, Karim" (Higgins) - 5:54
11. "Salaam: Tagi" - 4:15
12. "All This Is That: Hanuman's Dance" - 13:06
13. "All This Is That: Sky Valley" - 5:59
14. "All This Is That: Blues Tinge" (Higgins) - 5:02
15. "All This Is That: Atman Alone Abides" - 2:56
16. "Desire: Wild Orchids Bloom" - 6:42
17. "Desire: Advaita" - 3:35
18. "Desire: Chomolungma" - 12:57
19. "Devotion: Sally Sunflower Whitecloud" - 3:06
20. "Devotion: My Lord, My Lord" (Higgins, Lloyd) - 6:11
21. "Devotion: Windy Mountain" - 5:36
22. "Devotion: Through Fields and Underground" - 3:48
23. "Light of Love: Mi Corazon" - 3:24
24. "Light of Love: Beloved, Chimes at Midnight" (Higgins, Lloyd) - 5:18
25. "Light of Love: Take a Chance" (Higgins) - 4:04
26. "Surrender: Perfume of the Desert" - 4:31
27. "Surrender: Benares" - 2:21
28. "Surrender: Amor" (Higgins) - 4:25
29. "Surrender: Forever Dance" (Higgins, Lloyd) - 1:53
30. "Surrender: Bis" (Higgins) - 3:44

- Recorded in January 2001

== Personnel ==
- Charles Lloyd - tenor saxophone, alto saxophone, bass flute, alto flute, C flute, piano, tárogató, Tibetan oboe, percussion, maracas, voice
- Billy Higgins - drums, percussion, guitar, guimbri, Syrian one string, various Senegalese and Guinean hand drums, Indian hand drum, Juno's wood box, voice
- Manfred Eicher - executive producer
