= Tone Poem (album) =

2021 jazz album by Charles Lloyd & The Marvels

Studio album by Charles Lloyd
- Released: March 12, 2021
- Genre: Jazz
- Length: 70:00
- Label: Blue Note

Tone Poem is the third full-length album by Charles Lloyd & the Marvels. The album was released on 12 March 2021 on Blue Note Records. The nine tracks include new Lloyd originals along with pieces by Ornette Coleman, Thelonious Monk, Leonard Cohen, Gabor Szabo, and Bola de Nieve.

== Reception ==
The Guardian's John Fordham rated Tone Poem four stars out of five, noting how the music "evokes the sounds of songs" despite the lack of singers in the tracks. Stuart Nicholson of Jazzwise provided the same writing and similar feedback, as well as praise for the album's "sheer emotional range".

== Track listing ==
Tone Poem track listing
No.	Title	Length
1.	"Peace"	3:12
2.	"Ramblin"	4:59
3.	"Anthem"	6:19
4.	"Dismal Swamp"	6:31
5.	"Tone Poem"	9:04
6.	"Monk's Mood"	10:26
7.	"Ay Amor (Live)"	10:05
8.	"Lady Gabor"	8:36
9.	"Prayer"	8:27
Total length:		70:00

Japanese edition bonus track
No.	Title	Length
10.	"In My Room"	8:27
Total length:		78:32

== Personnel ==
- Charles Lloyd – saxophone
- Reuben Rogers – bass
- Eric Harland – drums
- Bill Frisell – guitar
- Greg Leisz - pedal steel guitar
