= Jumping the Creek =

Studio album by Charles Lloyd
- Released: April 5, 2005
- Recorded: January 2004
- Studio: Cello Studios; Los Angeles
- Genre: Jazz
- Length: 73:44
- Label: ECM; ECM 1911
- Producer: Charles Lloyd, Dorothy Darr, Manfred Eicher

Charles Lloyd chronology
Which Way Is East (2004)	Jumping the Creek (2005)	Sangam (2006)

Jumping the Creek is an album by jazz saxophonist Charles Lloyd recorded in January 2004 and released on ECM April the following year. The quartet features rhythm section Geri Allen, Robert Hurst and Eric Harland.

== Reception ==
The AllMusic review by Thom Jurek awarded the album 4 stars and states "this, like Lloyd's other recordings on ECM is about emotion, feeling, and a sense of peace and serenity. Lloyd uses the rough places in his improvisations, to be sure, but it is only to make the rough places plain, limpid, utterly integrated in a serene whole. On Jumping the Creek he succeeds seamlessly and ups his own artistic ante."

The All About Jazz review by John Kelman states "Jumping the Creek represents a clear highlight in a career filled with memorable milestones."

Professional ratings
Review scores
Source	Rating
Allmusic	4/5 stars
The Penguin Guide to Jazz Recordings	3/4 stars

== Track listing ==
All compositions by Charles Lloyd except as indicated

1. "Ne me quitte pas (If You Go Away)" (Jacques Brel) – 13:29
2. "Ken katta ma om (Bright Sun Upon You)" – 5:45
3. "Angel Oak Revisited" – 3:34
4. "Canon Perdido" – 3:01
5. "Jumping the Creek" – 5:57
6. "The Sufi's Tears" – 3:06
7. "Georgia Bright Suite: Pythagoras at Jeckyll Island/Sweet Georgia Bright" – 13:34
8. "Come Sunday" (Duke Ellington) – 5:52
9. "Both Veils Must Go" – 3:00
10. "Song of the Inuit" – 11:26

== Personnel ==
- Charles Lloyd – tenor saxophone, alto saxophone, tarogato
- Geri Allen – piano
- Robert Hurst – double bass
- Eric Harland – drums
