= Back East =

Studio album by Joshua Redman Trio
- Released: April 24, 2007
- Recorded: May 19–20 and June 18, 2006
- Studio: Avatar (New York, New York)
- Genre: Jazz
- Length: 63:18
- Label: Nonesuch
- Producer: Joshua Redman

Joshua Redman Trio chronology
Momentum (2005)	Back East (2007)	Compass (2009)

Professional ratings
Review scores
Source	Rating
AllMusic	4/5 stars
The Buffalo News	4/4 stars
The Boston Globe	positive
BBC	positive
The Washington Post	positive
Tom Hull	A−
The Penguin Guide to Jazz Recordings	3/4 stars

Back East is a 2007 studio album by American jazz saxophonist Joshua Redman. This is his twelfth full-size album recorded under his leadership.

== Background ==
The album bears several similarities to Sonny Rollins' 1957 album Way Out West, with two songs that also appear on Rollins' album: "I'm an Old Cowhand" and "Wagon Wheels". The album also mimics the instrumentation of Way Out West in featuring a pianoless trio headed by tenor sax.

== Reception ==
Matt Collar of AllMusic stated, "Back East showcases saxophonist Joshua Redman as he leads a few different trios through a cerebral and muscular set of originals and standards. Redman has long evinced the influences of such similarly inclined legends as Sonny Rollins, Dexter Gordon, and John Coltrane, and Back East is no exception -- which isn't to say it's business as usual. Admittedly, while this is a straight-ahead acoustic jazz date, it is one ripe with creative energy that finds Redman's knack for deeply thoughtful improvisation and unexpected rhythmic interplay in full flower."

Siddhartha Mitter of The Boston Globe wrote "Back East... represents a return to a certain post-bop orthodoxy as well as to New York, where the three rhythm sections it features are based. The title also references the 1957 Rollins album "Way Out West," which supplies two compositions, "I'm An Old Cowhand" and "Wagon Wheels." And on tracks like Coltrane's "India" and Redman's own "Indonesia" and "Mantra #5," the saxman signs an entry into jazz's long-running conversation with Asian rhythms, harmonies, and cultural themes. It's a lot of creative directions for one album to contain, let alone develop; pairings like the jaunty " The Surrey With the Fringe on Top" that opens the recording, with the spare and hypnotic soprano sax line that anchors "Zarafah," make this something of a tapas plate for jazz omnivores. The fluctuating personnel—between the three combos and guests, this is a trio album with 10 musicians—also hampers the record's cohesion. That said, each piece is a lovely miniature in its own right, and Redman, whose tone is both fleshy and bright, inhabits each setting with respect and ease. He's particularly affecting when he switches to soprano sax, and the soprano duet with Chris Cheek on "Mantra #5" is a standout. The last tracks feature Redman's father, saxman Dewey Redman, who died a few weeks after the session. "India," on which they duet, and the abstract finale "GJ," in which Joshua sits out, honor the father-son connection aptly."

In 50th Annual Grammy Awards, this album was nominated for Best Jazz Instrumental Album, Individual or Group.

== Track listing ==
No.	Title	Writer(s)	Length
1.	"The Surrey with the Fringe on Top"	Richard Rodgers, Oscar Hammerstein II	5:12
2.	"East of the Sun (and West of the Moon)"	Brooks Bowman	5:35
3.	"Zarafah"	Redman	7:58
4.	"Indian Song"	Wayne Shorter	6:10
5.	"I'm an Old Cowhand"	Johnny Mercer	6:06
6.	"Wagon Wheels"	Peter DeRose, William J. Hill	5:58
7.	"Back East"	Redman	6:40
8.	"Mantra #5"	Redman	6:10
9.	"Indonesia"	Redman	4:41
10.	"India"	John Coltrane	4:55
11.	"GJ"	Dewey Redman	3:40
Total length:			63:18

== Personnel ==
Musicians

- Joshua Redman – tenor and soprano saxophones (track: 1–10)
- Joe Lovano – tenor saxophone (track: 4)
- Chris Cheek – soprano saxophone (track: 8)
- Dewey Redman – tenor and alto saxophones (track: 10, 11)
- Larry Grenadier – double bass (tracks: 1, 2, 8–11)
- Christian McBride – double bass (tracks: 3, 4)
- Reuben Rogers – double bass (tracks: 5–7)
- Ali Jackson – drums (tracks: 1, 2, 8–11)
- Brian Blade – drums (tracks: 3, 4)
- Eric Harland – drums (tracks: 5–7)

Production

- Joshua Redman – producer
- James A. Farber – engineer (recording, mixing)
- Greg Calbi – engineer (mastering)
- Anthony Ruotolo – assistant engineer
- Eddie Jackson – assistant engineer
- Brian Montgomery – assistant engineer
- John Gall – design
- Michael Wilson – photography
