= Sangam (Charles Lloyd album) =

Live album by Charles Lloyd
- Released: April 4, 2006
- Recorded: May 23, 2004
- Venue: Santa Barbara, California
- Genre: Jazz
- Length: 74:54
- Label: ECM; ECM 1976
- Producer: Manfred Eicher

Charles Lloyd chronology
Jumping the Creek (2005)	Sangam (2006)	Rabo de Nube (2008)

Sangam is a live album by jazz saxophonist Charles Lloyd recorded in Santa Barbara, California on May 23, 2004 and released on ECM in April 2006. The trio features percussion section Zakir Hussain and Eric Harland.

== Reception ==
The AllMusic review by Thom Jurek awarded the album 4 stars and states "This music, while rooted in the rhythms of the world, is jazz without a doubt... what's on offer here is something truly unexpected, something wildly original and essential to jazz-improvisatory communication."

The All About Jazz review by Matt Cibula states "this album captures the three grooviest motherfuckers in the world, all playing together perfectly, and it deserves some serious consideration as what ESPN would call 'an instant classic.'"

Professional ratings
Review scores
Source	Rating
Allmusic	4/5 stars
The Penguin Guide to Jazz Recordings	4/4 stars

== Track listing ==
All compositions by Charles Lloyd except as indicated

1. "Dancing on One Foot" – 9:04
2. "Tales of Rumi" – 11:58
3. "Sangam" – 9:20
4. "Nataraj" – 2:47
5. "Guman" (Zakir Hussain) – 11:40
6. "Tender Warriors" – 8:56
7. "Hymn to the Mother" – 11:49
8. "Lady in the Harbor" – 3:27
9. "Little Peace" – 5:53

== Personnel ==
- Charles Lloyd – tenor saxophone, alto saxophone, bass flute, alto flute, tarogato, piano, percussion
- Zakir Hussain – tabla, voice, percussion
- Eric Harland – drums, percussion, piano
