= The Sky Will Still Be There Tomorrow =

Studio album by Charles Lloyd
- Released: March 15, 2024
- Recorded: March 2023
- Studio: Lloyd's home studio (Santa Barbara)
- Genre: Jazz
- Length: 90:39
- Label: Blue Note
- Producer: Charles Lloyd; Dorothy Darr; Joe Harley

Charles Lloyd chronology
Trio: Sacred Thread (2022)	The Sky Will Still Be There Tomorrow (2024)	Figure in Blue (2025)

Singles from The Sky Will Still Be There Tomorrow
- 1. "Defiant, Tender Warrior" Released: January 12, 2024; 2. "Monk's Dance" Released: February 2, 2024; 3. "Booker's Garden" Released: February 23, 2024

The Sky Will Still Be There Tomorrow is the fifty-first album by jazz saxophonist Charles Lloyd.

== Background ==
The Sky Will Still Be There Tomorrow is Charles Lloyd's fifty-first album. On the inspiration behind the title, Lloyd said: "So the sky is always, like, the closer I get to it, the Creator says, 'Not yet, Charles.'"

The inspiration for the album's original compositions first came during COVID-19 lockdowns when Lloyd was walking around the garden of his manager and romantic partner Dorothy Darr; various melodies appeared in his head, so he went to a piano and wrote "Defiant, Tender Warrior" and "The Lonely One". The album was recorded with Brian Blade, Jason Moran, and Larry Grenadier at Lloyd's home studio in Santa Barbara, approximately "two or three days" before the four performed live at the Lobero Theatre on March 18, 2023. Lloyd had chosen the other three to be the band for his next album in 2020, but scheduling issues delayed the recording until 2023.

The album was preceded by three singles: "Defiant, Tender Warrior", "Monk's Dance", and "Booker's Garden".

== Critical reception ==
Professional ratings
Aggregate scores
Source	Rating
Metacritic	95/100
Review scores
Source	Rating
AllMusic	4.5/5 stars
The Guardian	5/5 stars
Jazzwise	4/5 stars
Mojo	4/5 stars
Spin	A
Uncut	4.5/5 stars

According to the review aggregator Metacritic, The Sky Will Still Be There Tomorrow received "universal acclaim" based on a weighted average score of 95 out of 100 from six critic scores.

== Track listing ==
All tracks are written by Charles Lloyd except where noted.

No.	Title	Writer(s)	Length
1.	"Defiant, Tender Warrior"	Lloyd; Jason Moran^{[a]}	4:16
2.	"The Lonely One"		5:45
3.	"Monk's Dance"		6:49
4.	"The Water Is Rising"		5:08
5.	"Late Bloom"		1:02
6.	"Booker's Garden"		8:07
7.	"The Ghost of Lady Day"		6:43
8.	"The Sky Will Still Be There Tomorrow"		7:14
9.	"Beyond Darkness"		7:19
10.	"Sky Valley, Spirit of the Forest"		15:04
11.	"Balm in Gilead"	Lloyd^{[a]}; Harry Burleigh^{[a]}	3:06
12.	"Lift Every Voice and Sing"	Lloyd^{[a]}; James Weldon Johnson; John Rosamond Johnson	2:50
13.	"When the Sun Comes Up, Darkness Is Gone"		3:41
14.	"Cape to Cairo"		9:15
15.	"Defiant, Reprise; Homeward Dove"		4:20
Total length:			90:39

- ^{^[a]}Arranger

== Personnel ==
These credits have been adapted from music streaming services.

- Charles Lloyd – tenor saxophone (1–4, 6–15); alto flute, bass flute (5); production
- Dorothy Darr – production
- Joe Harley – production, sound supervision
- Jason Moran – piano (1–4, 6–15)
- Brian Blade – drums, percussion (1–4, 6–15)
- Larry Grenadier – double bass (1–4, 6–15)
- Dom Camardella – recording, mixing
- Kevin Gray – mastering

== Charts ==
Chart performance for The Sky Will Still Be There Tomorrow
Chart (2024)	Peak position
Belgian Albums (Ultratop Wallonia)	200
Scottish Albums (OCC)	63
Swiss Albums (Schweizer Hitparade)	63
UK Album Downloads (OCC)	68
UK Jazz & Blues Albums (OCC)	2
