= Dream Weaver (album) =

Studio album by Charles Lloyd
- Released: 1966
- Recorded: March 20, 1966
- Genre: Jazz
- Label: Atlantic
- Producer: Arif Mardin, George Avakian

Charles Lloyd chronology
Of Course, Of Course (1965)	Dream Weaver (1966)	Forest Flower (1966)

Professional ratings
Review scores
Source	Rating
Allmusic	4.5/5 stars
The Penguin Guide to Jazz Recordings	3/4 stars

Dream Weaver is the third album by jazz saxophonist Charles Lloyd, his first released on the Atlantic label, and the first recordings by the Charles Lloyd Quartet featuring Keith Jarrett, Cecil McBee and Jack DeJohnette. The Allmusic review by Thom Jurek awarded the album 4½ stars and states "Dream Weaver is a fully realized project by a band — a real band — in which each member has a unique part of the whole to contribute... There were no records like this one by new groups in 1966".

== Track listing ==
All compositions by Charles Lloyd except as indicated

1. "Autumn Sequence: Autumn Prelude/Autumn Leaves/Autumn Echo" (Joseph Kosma, Johnny Mercer, Jacques Prévert, Lloyd) - 12:01
2. "Dream Weaver: Meditation/Dervish Dance" - 11:35
3. "Bird Flight" - 9:07
4. "Love Ship" - 5:54
5. "Sombrero Sam" - 5:12
  - Recorded on March 20, 1966

== Personnel ==
- Charles Lloyd - tenor saxophone, flute
- Keith Jarrett - piano
- Cecil McBee - bass
- Jack DeJohnette - drums

== Production ==
- Phil Iehle - engineer
- Marvin Israel - cover design
- Charles Stewart - cover photography
