= Love-In =

Live album by Charles Lloyd
- Released: End of July 1967
- Recorded: January 27, 1967
- Genre: Jazz
- Label: Atlantic
- Producer: George Avakian

Charles Lloyd chronology
Charles Lloyd in Europe (1966)	Love-In (1967)	Journey Within (1967)

Love-In is a live album by jazz saxophonist Charles Lloyd recorded at the Fillmore Auditorium in San Francisco by the Charles Lloyd Quartet featuring Keith Jarrett, Ron McClure and Jack DeJohnette. Selections from the same concert were also released as Journey Within.

== Reception ==
The Allmusic review by Thom Jurek awarded the album 4 stars and states: "On Love-In, everything was jazz for the Charles Lloyd Quartet, and what they made jazz from opened the music up to everybody who heard it. The album is a lasting testament to that cultural ecumenism".

Professional ratings
Review scores
Source	Rating
Allmusic	4/5 stars

== Track listing ==
All compositions by Charles Lloyd except as indicated

1. "Tribal Dance" - 10:20
2. "Temple Bells" - 2:58
3. "Is It Really the Same??" (Keith Jarrett) - 6:04
4. "Here, There and Everywhere" (John Lennon, Paul McCartney) - 3:52
5. "Love-In" - 4:57
6. "Sunday Morning" (Jarrett) - 8:11
7. "Memphis Blues Again/Island Blues" - 9:10

- Recorded on January 27, 1967 at the Fillmore Auditorium, San Francisco, California

== Personnel ==
- Charles Lloyd - tenor saxophone, flute
- Keith Jarrett - piano
- Ron McClure - bass
- Jack DeJohnette - drums

== Production ==
- Wally Heider - recording engineer
- Stanislaw Zagórski - cover design
- Jim Marshall - cover photography
