= Forest Flower =

Forest Flower: Charles Lloyd at Monterey

Live album by Charles Lloyd
- Released: February 21, 1967
- Recorded: September 8, 1966; New York City (#3–4); September 18, 1966; Monterey Jazz Festival, Monterey
- Genre: Jazz
- Length: 39:17
- Label: Atlantic; SD 1473
- Producer: George Avakian

Charles Lloyd chronology
Dream Weaver (1966)	Forest Flower: Charles Lloyd at Monterey (1967)	The Flowering (1966)

Forest Flower: Charles Lloyd at Monterey is a live album by jazz saxophonist Charles Lloyd, recorded at the Monterey Jazz Festival in 1966 by the Charles Lloyd Quartet featuring Keith Jarrett, Cecil McBee and Jack DeJohnette. The album was a crossover hit, becoming popular on FM rock radio, and becoming one of the first jazz albums to sell over one million copies.

== Reception ==
The AllMusic review by Thom Jurek stated: "It is difficult to believe that, with players so young (and having been together under a year), Lloyd was able to muster a progressive jazz that was so far-reaching and so undeniably sophisticated, yet so rich and accessible... By the time the band reaches its final number they have touched upon virtually the entire history of jazz and still pushed it forward with seamless aplomb. Forest Flower is a great live record".

Professional ratings
Review scores
Source	Rating
AllMusic	5/5 stars
The Rolling Stone Jazz Record Guide	5/5 stars

== Track listing ==
1. "Forest Flower: Sunrise" (Lloyd) - 7:18
2. "Forest Flower: Sunset" (Lloyd) - 10:37
3. "Sorcery" (Keith Jarrett) - 5:18
4. "Song of Her" (Cecil McBee) - 5:24
5. "East of the Sun" (Brooks Bowman) - 10:40

== Personnel ==
- Charles Lloyd - tenor saxophone, flute
- Keith Jarrett - piano
- Cecil McBee - bass
- Jack DeJohnette - drums

== Production ==
- Wally Heider - recording engineer
- Marvin Israel - album design
- Jim Marshall - cover photography
