= 8: Kindred Spirits (Live from the Lobero) =

Live album by Charles Lloyd
- Released: February 28, 2020
- Recorded: March 15, 2018
- Venue: Lobero Theatre, Santa Barbara
- Genre: Jazz
- Length: 59:49
- Label: Blue Note 00602508001567
- Producer: Dorothy Darr; Jeffery Morse

Charles Lloyd chronology
Vanished Gardens (2018)	8: Kindred Spirits (2020)

Professional ratings
Aggregate scores
Source	Rating
Metacritic	80/100
Review scores
Source	Rating
All About Jazz	5/5 stars
AllMusic	4/5 stars
Financial Times	4/5 stars
Jazz Journal	4/5 stars
The Times	4/5 stars

8: Kindred Spirits (Live from the Lobero) is a 2020 live album by American jazz saxophonist Charles Lloyd. The album was released on 28 February 2020 on Blue Note Records to positive critical reviews.

== Reception ==
At Metacritic, that assigns a normalized rating out of 100 to reviews from mainstream critics, the album received an average score of 80, based on four reviews, which indicates "generally favorable reviews".

David Whiteis of JazzTimes wrote, "at his best, Lloyd’s commitment to music as a vehicle of spiritual uplift places him in a pantheon that includes Coltrane, Ayler, Sanders, and their musical progeny—as well as, for better or worse, the jam bands that gestated in San Francisco during Lloyd’s early heyday and have since forged a musical genre (as well as an entire subculture) of their own." Thom Jurek of AllMusic stated, "Arguably, this edition of 8: Kindred Spirits, though only a first set, is one of Lloyd's strongest live offerings to date." Peter Gamble in his review for Jazz Journal commented, "It is encouraging to find Lloyd in such splendid form at this juncture in his life..." Rob Shepherd of PostGenre noted, "From his early sideman recordings with Chico Hamilton to his more recent Marvels group, [Lloyd] has refused to produce art that can be concisely boxed into any form. 8: Kindred Spirits (Live from the Lobero) perfectly surveys this nature of his work."

== Track listing ==
No.	Title	Writer(s)	Length
1.	"Dream Weaver"	Lloyd	21:05
2.	"Requiem"	Lloyd	11:32
3.	"La Llorona"	Traditional	9:03
4.	"Ruminations"	Lloyd	18:07
Total length:			59:49

== Personnel ==
- Charles Lloyd – saxophone
- Reuben Rogers – bass
- Eric Harland – drums
- Julian Lage – guitar
- Gerald Clayton – piano
