= The Call (Charles Lloyd album) =

Studio album by Charles Lloyd
- Released: November 8, 1993
- Recorded: July 1993
- Studio: Rainbow Studio; Oslo, Norway
- Genre: Jazz
- Length: 76:56
- Label: ECM; ECM 1522
- Producer: Manfred Eicher

Charles Lloyd chronology
Acoustic Masters I (1993)	The Call (1993)	All My Relations (1995)

The Call is an album by American jazz saxophonist Charles Lloyd recorded in July 1993 and released on ECM November later that year. The quartet features rhythm section Bobo Stenson, Anders Jormin, and Billy Hart.

== Reception ==
The AllMusic review by David R. Adler awarded the album 3 stars stating "While the record documents plenty of stirring musicianship, Lloyd the composer seems to be running low on fresh ideas and distinctive melodies."

Professional ratings
Review scores
Source	Rating
AllMusic	3/5 stars
The Penguin Guide to Jazz Recordings	3/4 stars
Tom Hull	B+

== Track listing ==
All compositions by Charles Lloyd.

1. "Nocturne" – 5:23
2. "Song" – 12:44
3. "Dwija" – 6:46
4. "Glimpse" – 8:33
5. "Imke" – 3:55
6. "Amarma" – 7:18
7. "Figure in Blue, Memories of Duke" – 9:25
8. "The Blessing" – 10:54
9. "Brother on the Rooftop" – 11:58

== Personnel ==
- Charles Lloyd – tenor saxophone
- Bobo Stenson – piano
- Anders Jormin – double bass
- Billy Hart – drums
