= Hagar's Song =

Studio album by Charles Lloyd and Jason Moran
- Released: February 26, 2013
- Recorded: April 2012
- Studio: Santa Barbara Sound Design; Santa Barbara, California
- Genre: Jazz
- Length: 68:58
- Label: ECM 2311
- Producer: Charles Lloyd and Dorothy Darr

Charles Lloyd chronology
Athens Concert (2011)	Hagar's Song (2013)	Wild Man Dance (2015)

Hagar's Song is an album by saxophonist Charles Lloyd and pianist Jason Moran recorded in April 2012 and released on ECM February the following year.

== Reception ==
Professional ratings
Aggregate scores
Source	Rating
Metacritic	79/100
Review scores
Source	Rating
Allmusic	4/5 stars
All About Jazz	5/5 stars
The Guardian	3/5 stars
PopMatters	7/10 stars

Response was positive, with Metacritic assigning the album an aggregate score of 79 out of 100 based on 6 critical reviews indicating "Generally favorable reviews".

The AllMusic review by Thom Jurek awarded the album 4 stars stating "Hagar's Song finds Lloyd and Moran at their most naturally curious and deeply attentive best, offering a conversation so intimate the listener may occasionally feel she is eavesdropping."

All About Jazz reviewer John Kelman said, "In a set that runs the gamut from well-known standards by George Gershwin, Billy Strayhorn and Duke Ellington to relatively more contemporary fare from Bob Dylan and Brian Wilson, Lloyd and Moran demonstrate the kind of empathy and trust that only comes from considerably time spent together ... There's little that's predictable about either player, but with Hagar's Song—imbued, as it is, with constants of surprise, simpatico and stellar performances—both Lloyd and Moran have made the leap to a new plateau."

In The Guardian, John Fordham wrote "Saxophonist Charles Lloyd, soon to be 75, here gives an intimate closeup of his warm relationship with brilliant pianist Jason Moran—and with his enslaved great-great-grandmother, who names the album through Lloyd's suite in her memory."

The PopMatters review by Will Layman observed "Hagar’s Song is nothing more and nothing less than a set of duets with Moran. And in many respects it is the most intimate—and best—work of Lloyd’s career ... Hagar’s Song is low on flash. And it rests with love against your ear."

== Track listing ==
All compositions by Charles Lloyd except as indicated

1. "Pretty Girl" (Billy Strayhorn) - 4:51
2. "Mood Indigo" (Duke Ellington) - 5:17
3. "Bess, You Is My Woman Now" (George Gershwin) - 3:39
4. "All About Ronnie" (Joe Greene) - 4:20
5. "Pictogram" - 3:59
6. "You've Changed" (Carl Fischer) - 4:51
7. "Hagar Suite: Journey Up River" - 6:20
8. "Hagar Suite: Dreams of White Bluff" - 9:46
9. "Hagar Suite: Alone" - 2:30
10. "Hagar Suite: Bolivar Blues" - 4:18
11. "Hagar Suite: Hagar's Lullaby" - 5:44
12. "Rosetta" (Earl Hines) - 4:41
13. "I Shall Be Released" (Bob Dylan) - 5:11
14. "God Only Knows" (Brian Wilson) - 3:31

== Personnel ==
- Charles Lloyd — tenor saxophone, alto saxophone, bass flute, alto flute
- Jason Moran — piano, tambourine
