= Discovery! =

1964 album by Charles Lloyd

Studio album by Charles Lloyd
- Released: November 1964
- Recorded: May 27, 1964 (#2–3, 6–7); May 29, 1964 (#1, 4–5, 8); New York City
- Genre: Jazz
- Length: 48:10
- Label: Columbia; CL 2267
- Producer: George Avakian

Charles Lloyd chronology
Discovery! (1964)	Of Course, Of Course (1965)

Professional ratings
Review scores
Source	Rating
Allmusic	4/5 stars

Discovery! is the debut album by jazz saxophonist Charles Lloyd released on the Columbia label featuring performances by Lloyd with Don Friedman, Eddie Khan, Roy Haynes, Richard Davis and J.C. Moses. The Allmusic review by Scott Yanow awarded the album 4 stars and states "Lloyd's Coltrane-inspired sound was already in place, and his flute playing was becoming distinctive. The music is essentially melodic but advanced hard bop, a strong start to an important career". The piece "Ol' Five Spot" is a homage to the legendary New York jazz club of the same name. The album was also released with the title Bizarre in the UK, at the time.

== Track listing ==
All compositions by Charles Lloyd except as indicated.

1. "Forest Flower" - 7:54
2. "How Can I Tell You" - 5:16
3. "Little Peace" - 6:32
4. "Bizarre" - 4:20
5. "Days of Wine and Roses" (Henry Mancini, Johnny Mercer) - 5:53
6. "Sweet Georgia Bright" - 5:45
7. "Love Song to a Baby" - 5:56
8. "Ol' Five Spot" - 6:34

== Personnel ==
Tracks 1, 4–5, 8

- Charles Lloyd - tenor saxophone, flute
- Don Friedman - piano
- Eddie Khan - bass
- Roy Haynes - drums

Tracks 2–3, 6–7

- Charles Lloyd - tenor saxophone, flute
- Don Friedman - piano
- Richard Davis - bass
- J. C. Moses - drums

== Production ==
- Henry Parker - photography
