= Of Course, of Course =

Of Course, Of Course

Studio album by Charles Lloyd
- Released: Mid November 1965
- Recorded: May 8, 1964, March 8, 1965 & October 15, 1965
- Studio: Columbia 7th Ave, New York City
- Genre: Jazz
- Label: Columbia
- Producer: George Avakian, John Simon

Charles Lloyd chronology
Discovery! (1964)	Of Course, Of Course (1965)	Dream Weaver (1966)

Professional ratings
Review scores
Source	Rating
Allmusic	4/5 stars

Of Course, Of Course is the second album by jazz saxophonist Charles Lloyd released on the Columbia label featuring performances by Lloyd with Gábor Szabó, Ron Carter, and Tony Williams. The Allmusic review by Scott Yanow and Thom Jurek awarded the album 4 stars and states "Whether on tenor or flute, Lloyd was quickly coming into his own as an original voice, and this underrated set is a minor classic".

== Track listing ==
All compositions by Charles Lloyd except as indicated

1. "Of Course, Of Course" – 4:45
2. "The Song My Lady Sings" – 2:28
3. "The Best Thing for You" (Irving Berlin) – 5:18
4. "The Things We Did Last Summer" (Sammy Cahn, Jule Styne) – 6:08
5. "Apex" – 3:59
6. "One for Joan" – 5:07
7. "Goin' to Memphis" – 3:38
8. "Voice in the Night" – 6:44
9. "Third Floor Richard" – 6:16
10. "East of the Sun (and West of the Moon)" (Brooks Bowman) – 4:54 (Bonus track on CD reissue)
11. "Island Blues" – 3:25 (Bonus track on CD reissue)
12. "Sun Dance" – 3:32 (Bonus track on CD reissue)

- Recorded at Columbia Studio A, New York City on May 8, 1964 (tracks 2–4, 6–7, 10), March 08, 1965 ( tracks 1, 5, 8–9) and October 15, 1965 (tracks 11–12)

== Personnel ==
- Charles Lloyd – tenor saxophone, flute
- Gábor Szabó – guitar
- Ron Carter – bass (tracks 1–3, 5–10)
- Tony Williams – drums (tracks 1–3, 5–10)
- Albert Stinson – bass (tracks 11–12)
- Pete LaRoca – drums (tracks 11–12)
- Robbie Robertson – guitar (track 12)

=== Production ===
- Roy Halee, Stan Tonkel – recording engineers
- Richard Mantel – art direction and design
- Bob Cato – cover photography
