= The Flowering =

Live album by Charles Lloyd
- Released: July 1971
- Recorded: July 23 & 24 and October 29, 1966
- Genre: Jazz
- Length: 42:39
- Label: Atlantic
- Producer: George Avakian

Charles Lloyd chronology
Forest Flower (1967)	The Flowering (1971)	Charles Lloyd in Europe (1966)

The Flowering is a live album by jazz saxophonist Charles Lloyd performed in France and Norway by the Charles Lloyd Quartet featuring Keith Jarrett, Cecil McBee and Jack DeJohnette.

== Reception ==
The Allmusic review by Scott Yanow awarded the album 4½ stars and states "This set is even a bit better than the In Europe album due to the stronger (if more familiar) material".

Professional ratings
Review scores
Source	Rating
Allmusic	4.5/5 stars

== Track listing ==
All compositions by Charles Lloyd except as indicated

1. "Speak Low" (Ogden Nash, Kurt Weill) - 8:26
2. "Love-In/Island Blues" - 6:19
3. "Wilpan's" (Cecil McBee) - 6:39
4. "Gypsy '66" (Gábor Szabó) - 14:11
5. "Goin' to Memphis/Island Blues" - 7:04

Liner Notes state that the entire album was recorded at Aulaen Hall, Oslo, Norway. JazzDisco.Org states that track 5 was recorded on July 23 or 24, 1966 at Juan-les-Pins Jazz Festival, Antibes, France and all other tracks on October 29, 1966 at Aulaen Hall, Oslo, Norway

== Personnel ==
- Charles Lloyd - tenor saxophone, flute
- Keith Jarrett - piano
- Cecil McBee - bass
- Jack DeJohnette - drums

== Production ==
- Meny Bloch - engineer
