= Sara Leib =

American jazz vocalist and educator (born 1981)

Sara Leib (born December 21, 1981) is an American composer, jazz vocalist, and educator.

== Biography ==
Leib was member of the Grammy High Schools National Jazz Ensemble. She studied at Berklee College of Music, New England Conservatory, and the Thornton School of Music at University of Southern California. Her teachers included Jerry Bergonzi, Dominique Eade, and Steve Lacy. While in school, she won a DownBeat magazine award for Outstanding Performance by a College Jazz Vocalist. She participated in the Jazz Aspen Snowmass Academy in Aspen, Colorado, where she worked with Christian McBride, Allan Harris, and Cyrus Chestnut. An active performer since graduating in 2003, Leib has performed and taught on five continents, at the Academy Awards, including as a guest soloist with the Blue Man Group at the Hollywood Bowl. She released her first album independently in 2003.

She composed the original song If I Could (Love Me Through), which appeared on Episode 5 of Season 1 the TV show, South of Nowhere, in 2005. Leib’s sophomore release, "Secret Love", was released by OA2 records in 2012 to critical acclaim. Pianists Taylor Eigsti and Aaron Parks share the piano chair, rounded out by bassist Harish Raghavan, drummer Eric Harland, with appearances by percussionist Richie Barshay and tenor saxophonist Dayna Stephens.

Today, Leib continues to sing, compose, and teach from her teaching studio in Los Angeles. In 2017, Leib released Voxercise, the vocal warmup app, and her teaching website, SingingTV.com maintains a substantial viewership on Youtube.

== Discography ==
=== As leader ===
- It's Not the Moon (Panfer, 2003)
- Secret Love (OA2, 2012)

=== As sideman ===
- Street Cries, Ariel Alexander & Jon Bremen (2014)
