= Passin' Thru (Charles Lloyd album) =

Live album by Charles Lloyd New Quartet
- Released: July 14, 2017
- Recorded: June 30 and July 29, 2016
- Venue: Montreux Jazz Festival, Montreux, Switzerland and The Lensic, Santa Fe, New Mexico
- Genre: Jazz
- Length: 74:47
- Label: Blue Note
- Producer: Dorothy Darr, Charles Lloyd

Charles Lloyd chronology
I Long to See You (2016)	Passin' Thru (2017)	Vanished Gardens (2018)

Passin' Thru is a live album by jazz saxophonist Charles Lloyd, recorded at the Montreux Jazz Festival and in Santa Fe in 2016 and released on the Blue Note label in 2017.

Professional ratings
Review scores
Source	Rating
AllMusic	4/5 stars
All About Jazz	4.5/5 stars
All About Jazz	4.5/5 stars
The Guardian	4/5 stars

== Reception ==
The AllMusic review by Thom Jurek stated: "Though the Charles Lloyd New Quartet has been together for a decade, they haven't recorded as a group since 2011 ... But not recording together doesn't mean the same thing as not playing, as amply evidenced here ... Passin' Thru finds the great saxophonist looking back through his catalog as well as offering new material. ... At 79, Lloyd shows no signs of slowing down. On Passin Thru', his quartet delivers a truckload of joy, grit, grace, and passion." On All About Jazz, Mark Sullivan commented: "Chemistry is an elusive thing, but this quartet has it in spades. Charles Lloyd draws from a seemingly inexhaustible well of creativity—he has never sounded better, and the quartet format has never sounded fresher." Dan Bilawsky said: "There's a reason that this band is one of the most celebrated ensembles of our time, and it's connected to its seemingly self-contradictory skill of knowing how to hold on and let go all at once. That gift is there to see and hear in every performance on this album. This band may just be passing through life like the rest of us, but it's most certainly made its mark in the process". In The Guardian, John Fordham commented: "There's a vivid live atmosphere, and this set will stir plenty of memories of Lloyd gigs for his many admirers". In JazzTimes, Michael J. West wrote: "Passin’ Thru might be this quartet's best recording—and is an easy candidate for the year's finest jazz album".

== Track listing ==
All compositions by Charles Lloyd

1. "Dream Weaver" – 17:45
2. "Part 5, Ruminations" – 11:54
3. "Nu Blues" – 11:51
4. "How Can I Tell You" – 9:46
5. "Tagore on the Delta" – 7:45
6. "Passin' Thru" – 7:22
7. "Shiva Prayer" – 8:24

== Personnel ==
- Charles Lloyd – tenor saxophone, flute
- Jason Moran – piano
- Reuben Rogers - bass
- Eric Harland - drums
