= I Long to See You =

Studio album by Charles Lloyd and The Marvels
- Released: February 5, 2016
- Recorded: April 27–28, 2015
- Venue: Lobero Theatre, Santa Barbara, CA
- Studio: Santa Barbara Sound Design, Santa Barbara, CA
- Genre: Jazz
- Length: 67:46
- Label: Blue Note
- Producer: Dorothy Darr, Charles Lloyd, Don Was

Charles Lloyd chronology
Wild Man Dance (2015)	I Long to See You (2016)	Passin' Thru (2017)

I Long to See You is an album by the jazz saxophonist Charles Lloyd, recorded in 2015 and released on the Blue Note Records label the following year.

Professional ratings
Aggregate scores
Source	Rating
Metacritic	74/100
Review scores
Source	Rating
AllMusic	3.5/5 stars
All About Jazz	4.5/5 stars
All About Jazz	4.5/5 stars
The Guardian	4/5 stars

== Reception ==
Metacritic assigned the album an aggregate score of 74 out of 100 based on five critical reviews. The AllMusic review by Thom Jurek stated, "I Long to See You is well worth investigating even if, at times, it is overly tentative." On All About Jazz, Ian Patterson wrote, "I Long To See You is a consistently beautiful offering—another sure arrow into infinity from Lloyd," while Dan Bilawsky commented, "I Long To See You is the first album collaboration between Lloyd and Frisell. It's an impressive mix of the familiar and foreign that manages to fall right into the wheelhouse of both artists. ... It may be Lloyd's name in lights, but the music speaks to the true partnership at play." In The Guardian, John Fordham thought that "Lloyd and Frisell sound like lifelong soulmates". In JazzTimes, Thomas Conrad wrote, "I Long to See You is mostly gorgeous ... This ensemble, even if it proves short-lived, sounds inevitable, preordained."

== Track listing ==
All compositions by Charles Lloyd except where noted

1. "Masters of War" (Bob Dylan) – 8:05
2. "Of Course, Of Course" – 6:03
3. "La Llorona" (Traditional) – 6:02
4. "Shenandoah" (Traditional) – 6:23
5. "Sombrero Sam" – 7:31
6. "All My Trials" (Traditional) – 5:02
7. "Last Night I Had the Strangest Dream" (Ed McCurdy) – 4:50
8. "Abide with Me" (Traditional) – 1:22
9. "You Are So Beautiful" (Billy Preston, Bruce Fisher) – 6:05
10. "Barche Lamsel" – 16:25

== Personnel ==
- Charles Lloyd – tenor saxophone, flute
- Bill Frisell – guitar
- Greg Leisz – pedal steel guitar
- Reuben Rogers – double bass
- Eric Harland – drums
- Norah Jones – vocals (track 9)
- Willie Nelson – vocals, guitar (track 7)
