= Fish Out of Water (Charles Lloyd album) =

Studio album by Charles Lloyd
- Released: 1990
- Recorded: July 1989
- Studios: Rainbow Studio; Oslo, Norway
- Genre: Jazz
- Length: 57:47
- Labels: ECM; ECM 1398
- Producer: Manfred Eicher

Charles Lloyd chronology
One Night with Blue Note Volume 4 (1985)	Fish Out of Water (1990)	Notes from Big Sur (1992)

Fish Out of Water is an album by jazz saxophonist Charles Lloyd recorded in July 1989 and released on ECM the following year. The quartet features rhythm section Bobo Stenson, Palle Danielsson and Jon Christensen.

== Reception ==
The AllMusic review by David R. Adler stated: "While some may find the disc a bit too placid overall, there's much to be said for Lloyd's unruffled, effortlessly bluesy playing".

Professional ratings
Review scores
Source	Rating
AllMusic	3/5 stars
Tom Hull	B+
The Penguin Guide to Jazz Recordings	3/4 stars

== Track listing ==
All compositions by Charles Lloyd

1. "Fish Out of Water" – 9:24
2. "Haghia Sophia" – 7:29
3. "The Dirge" – 10:14
4. "Bharati" – 8:28
5. "Eyes of Love" – 8:36
6. "Mirror" – 9:34
7. "Tellaro" – 4:02 Bonus track on CD reissue

== Personnel ==
- Charles Lloyd – tenor saxophone, flute
- Bobo Stenson – piano
- Palle Danielsson – bass
- Jon Christensen – drums
