= Acoustic Masters I =

Studio album by Charles Lloyd
- Released: 1994
- Recorded: July 1993
- Genre: Jazz
- Length: 59:14
- Label: Atlantic
- Producer: Lenny White

Charles Lloyd chronology
Notes from Big Sur (1992)	Acoustic Masters I (1994)	The Call (1993)

Acoustic Masters I is an album by jazz saxophonist Charles Lloyd recorded in July 1993 by Lloyd with Cedar Walton, Buster Williams and Billy Higgins.

== Reception ==
The Allmusic review awarded the album 4½ stars.

Professional ratings
Review scores
Source	Rating
Allmusic	4.5/5 stars

== Track listing ==
All compositions by Charles Lloyd except as indicated

1. "Blues for Bill" – 9:48
2. "Clandestine" (Cedar Walton) – 9:08
3. "Sweet Georgia Bright" – 5:52
4. "Lady Day" – 7:13
5. "Green Chimneys" (Thelonious Monk) – 5:50
6. "Strivers Jewels" (Buster Williams) – 5:23
7. "Hommage" – 10:04
8. "To C.L." (Billy Higgins) – 6:03

== Personnel ==
- Charles Lloyd – tenor saxophone
- Cedar Walton – piano
- Buster Williams – double bass
- Billy Higgins – drums
