= Canto (Charles Lloyd album) =

Studio album by Charles Lloyd
- Released: June 3, 1997
- Recorded: December 1996
- Studio: Rainbow Studio; Oslo, Norway
- Genre: Jazz; post-bop
- Length: 65:15
- Label: ECM; ECM 1635
- Producer: Manfred Eicher

Charles Lloyd chronology
All My Relations (1995)	Canto (1997)	Voice in the Night (1999)

Canto is an album by jazz saxophonist Charles Lloyd, recorded in December 1996 and released on ECM the following year. The quartet features rhythm section Bobo Stenson, Anders Jormin and Billy Hart.

== Reception ==
The AllMusic review by Thom Jurek stated that "Canto is the song of a master who employs all of his tools in the creation of a work of art".

The All About Jazz review by Alex Henderson stated: "Lloyd, like Trane, has always been very spiritual, and there's no way getting around the fact that spirituality is a crucial part of Canto. The rewarding post-bop session has a meditative quality, and Lloyd's modal improvisations draw heavily on Middle Eastern and Asian spiritual music... [a] strong addition to Lloyd's catalogue."

Professional ratings
Review scores
Source	Rating
AllMusic	4.5/5 stars
Tom Hull	B+
The Penguin Guide to Jazz Recordings	3.5/4 stars

== Track listing ==
All compositions by Charles Lloyd

1. "Tales of Rumi" – 16:41
2. "How Can I Tell You" – 6:18
3. "Desolation Sound" – 6:05
4. "Canto" – 13:20
5. "Nachiketa's Lament" – 6:18
6. "M" – 13:13
7. "Durga Durga" – 3:20

== Personnel ==
- Charles Lloyd – tenor saxophone, Tibetan oboe
- Bobo Stenson – piano
- Anders Jormin – double bass
- Billy Hart – drums
