= Journey Within =

Live album by Charles Lloyd
- Released: December 1967
- Recorded: January 27, 1967
- Genre: Jazz
- Length: 36:57
- Label: Atlantic
- Producer: George Avakian

Charles Lloyd chronology
Love-In (1967)	Journey Within (1967)	Charles Lloyd in the Soviet Union (1967)

Journey Within is a live album by jazz saxophonist Charles Lloyd recorded at the Fillmore Auditorium in San Francisco at the same concert that produced Love-In and performed by the Charles Lloyd Quartet featuring Keith Jarrett, Ron McClure and Jack DeJohnette.

== Reception ==
The Allmusic review awarded the album 3 stars.

Professional ratings
Review scores
Source	Rating
Allmusic	3/5 stars

== Track listing ==
All compositions by Charles Lloyd except as indicated

1. "Journey Within" - 11:29
2. "Love No. 3" (Keith Jarrett) - 5:37
3. "Memphis Green" - 9:15
4. "Lonesome Child: Song/Dance" - 10:36

- Recorded on January 27, 1967 at the Fillmore Auditorium, San Francisco, California

== Personnel ==
- Charles Lloyd - tenor saxophone, flute
- Keith Jarrett - piano, soprano saxophone on "Lonesome Child: Song/Dance"
- Ron McClure - double-bass
- Jack DeJohnette - drums

== Production ==
- Wally Heider - recording engineer
