= A Night in Copenhagen =

Live album by Charles Lloyd
- Released: 1985
- Recorded: July 11, 1983
- Venue: Copenhagen Jazz Festival, Copenhagen
- Genre: Jazz
- Length: 66:00
- Label: Blue Note
- Producer: Charles Lloyd, Dorothy Darr, Gabreal Franklin

Charles Lloyd chronology
Montreux 82 (1983)	A Night in Copenhagen (1985)	One Night with Blue Note Volume 4 (1985)

A Night in Copenhagen is a live album by jazz saxophonist Charles Lloyd featuring a performance recorded in Copenhagen in 1983 by Lloyd with Michel Petrucciani, Palle Danielsson and Woody Theus with guest vocalist Bobby McFerrin.

== Reception ==
The Allmusic review by Scott Yanow awarded the album 4 stars stating "Lloyd, coaxed out of retirement by Petrucciani, sounded virtually unchanged from his earlier days; the passion and enthusiasm were still there".

Professional ratings
Review scores
Source	Rating
Allmusic	4/5 stars

== Track listing ==
All compositions by Charles Lloyd

1. "Lotus Land (To Thakur and Trane)" 9:08
2. "Lady Day" 7:22
3. "El Encanto" 6:23
4. "Third Floor Richard" 8:14
5. "Night Blooming Jasmine" 14:23
6. "Of Course, Of Course" Bonus Track on CD 9:45
7. "Sweet Georgia Bright" Bonus Track on CD 11:45
  - Recorded at the Copenhagen Jazz Festival, Copenhagen, Denmark on July 11, 1983

== Personnel ==
- Charles Lloyd – tenor saxophone (2, 5, 7), flute (3, 4, 6), Chinese oboe (1)
- Michel Petrucciani – piano
- Palle Danielsson – double bass
- Woody Theus – drums
- Bobby McFerrin – vocals (tracks 4 & 6)
