= Montreux 82 =

Live album by Charles Lloyd Quartet
- Released: 1983
- Recorded: July 25, 1982
- Venue: Montreux Jazz Festival, Switzerland
- Genre: Jazz
- Length: 43:09
- Label: Elektra/Musician; 60161
- Producer: Gabreal Franklin, Charles Lloyd

Charles Lloyd chronology
| Autumn in New York (1979) | Montreux 82 (1983) | A Night in Copenhagen (1985) |

Montreux 82 is a live album by saxophonist Charles Lloyd recorded at the Montreux Jazz Festival in 1982 and released on the Elektra/Musician label the following year.

== Reception ==
Professional ratings
Review scores
| Source | Rating |
|---|---|
| Allmusic | 4/5 stars |

Allmusic's Scott Yanow said: "Charles Lloyd came out of isolation and retirement in 1982 due to the persuasion of the then-unknown pianist Michel Petrucciani. As can be heard on this concert LP from the 1982 Montreux Jazz Festival, Lloyd's styles and sounds on tenor and flute were unchanged from his glory days in the 1960s ... excellent music".

== Track listing ==
All compositions by Charles Lloyd except where noted

1. Introduction – 1:20
2. "The Call (Imke)" – 10:13
3. "Wind in the Trees" – 11:36
4. "Very Early" (Bill Evans) – 10:37
5. "Michel" – 1:13
6. "Forest Flower: 1. Sunrise 2. Sunset" – 11:45

== Personnel ==
- Charles Lloyd – tenor saxophone, flute
- Michel Petrucciani – piano
- Palle Danielsson – bass
- Son Ship Theus – drums
