= Compass (Joshua Redman album) =

Studio album by Joshua Redman Trio
- Released: January 13, 2009
- Recorded: March 24–26, 2008
- Studio: Avatar (New York, New York)
- Genre: Post-bop
- Length: 1:12:26
- Label: Nonesuch Records 7559-79923-0
- Producer: Joshua Redman, James Farber

Joshua Redman chronology
Back East (2007)	Compass (2009)	James Farm (2011)

Professional ratings
Aggregate scores
Source	Rating
Metacritic	83/100
Review scores
Source	Rating
AllMusic	4/5 stars
The Buffalo News	3/4 stars
Entertainment Weekly	B+
The Guardian	4/5 stars
Time Out Dubai	5/7
Tom Hull	B+

Compass is a studio album by jazz saxophonist Joshua Redman. It was released on January 13, 2009 via Nonesuch Records label to a critical success, scoring 83% on Metacritic.

== Reception ==
Thom Jurek of AllMusic wrote "Joshua Redman's 2007 album Back East rightfully drew critical comparisons to Sonny Rollins' legendary trio date Way Out West, given everything from the mirror image implication in the title to the manner in which Redman offered the material on the set. The presence of Rollins looms large over Compass as well... on Compass, Redman has finally learned the greatest trick from his mentor -- to walk out on the wire with his horn more, trust the fluid abilities of his incredible rhythm section(s), and let his inner sense of song and freedom take precedence over his already well-established sense of discipline."

Daryl Easlee of BBC added "Bleak, emotional and full of gravity, Compass is the sort of serious-minded album that gives jazz in 2009 a very good name".

== Track listing ==
No.	Title	Writer(s)	Length
1.	"Uncharted"	Larry Grenadier, Gregory Hutchinson, Joshua Redman, Reuben Rogers	2:05
2.	"Faraway"	Redman	6:43
3.	"Identity Thief"	Redman	6:39
4.	"Just Like You"	Redman	7:30
5.	"Hutchhiker's Guide"	Redman	5:47
6.	"Ghost"	Redman	3:38
7.	"Insomnomaniac"	Redman	8:39
8.	"Moonlight"	Ludwig van Beethoven	5:03
9.	"Un Peu Fou"	Redman	5:05
10.	"March"	Larry Grenadier	3:22
11.	"Round Reuben"	Redman	6:26
12.	"Little Ditty"	Redman	8:30
13.	"Through the Valley"	Brian Blade	2:59
Total length:			1:12:26

== Personnel ==
Musicians

- Joshua Redman – soprano saxophone, tenor saxophone
- Larry Grenadier – bass
- Reuben Rogers – bass
- Brian Blade – drums
- Gregory Hutchinson – drums

Production

- Joshua Redman – producer
- James Farber – producer, engineer (recording, mixing)
- Justin Gerrish – assistant engineer (recording)
- Rick Kwan – assistant engineer (mixing)
- Greg Calbi – engineer (mastering)
- Karina Benznicki – production supervisor
- Eli Cane – production coordination
- John Gall – design
- Ronen Givony – editorial coordinator
- Michael Wilson – photography

== Charts ==
Chart performance for Compass
Chart (2009)	Peak position
French Albums (SNEP)	158
US Top Jazz Albums (Billboard)	4
