= Charles Lloyd in the Soviet Union =

Live album by Charles Lloyd
- Released: November 1970
- Recorded: May 14, 1967
- Genre: Jazz
- Length: 47:54
- Label: Atlantic
- Producer: George Avakian

Charles Lloyd chronology
Journey Within (1967)	Charles Lloyd in the Soviet Union (1970)	Soundtrack (1969)

Charles Lloyd in the Soviet Union is a live album by jazz saxophonist Charles Lloyd recorded at the International Jazz Festival "Tallinn 1967", Kalev Sport Hall, Tallinn, Estonia (at that time part of the USSR) in 1967 by the Charles Lloyd Quartet featuring Keith Jarrett, Ron McClure and Jack DeJohnette.

== Reception ==
The Allmusic review by Scott Yanow awarded the album 4½ stars and states "A measure of the band's popularity is that Lloyd and his sidemen were able to have a very successful tour of the Soviet Union during a period when jazz was still being discouraged by the communists. This well-received festival appearance has four lengthy performances... and Lloyd (who has always had a soft-toned Coltrane influenced tenor style and a more distinctive voice on flute) is in top form".

Professional ratings
Review scores
Source	Rating
Allmusic	4.5/5 stars

== Track listing ==
All tracks are written by Charles Lloyd, except where noted.

No.	Title	Writer(s)	Length
1.	"Days and Nights Waiting"	Keith Jarrett	7:06
2.	"Sweet Georgia Bright"		17:54
3.	"Love Song to a Baby"		12:32
4.	"Tribal Dance"		10:22

- Recorded on May 14, 1967 at Kalev Sport Hall, Tallinn, Estonia, USSR

== Personnel ==
- Charles Lloyd - tenor saxophone, flute
- Keith Jarrett - piano
- Ron McClure - bass
- Jack DeJohnette - drums

== See also ==
- Heinrich Schultz
