= Wild Man Dance =

Live album by Charles Lloyd
- Released: April 14, 2015
- Recorded: November 24, 2013
- Venue: National Forum of Music, Wrocław, Poland
- Genre: Jazz
- Length: 1:14:25
- Label: Blue Note
- Producer: Dorothy Darr, Charles Lloyd

Charles Lloyd chronology
Hagar's Song (2013)	Wild Man Dance (2015)	I Long to See You (2016)

Wild Man Dance is a live album by jazz saxophonist Charles Lloyd, recorded in 2013 and released on the Blue Note label in April 2015.

== Reception ==
Professional ratings
Review scores
Source	Rating
AllMusic	4/5 stars
All About Jazz	4.5/5 stars
Los Angeles Times	3.5 stars

AllMusic said the album is "a success on virtually every level." All About Jazz noted that "While plenty of musicians tend to slow down as they get older, the opposite seems to be happening with this septuagenarian", and said it "is every bit as magical as the best of Lloyd's output." The Los Angeles Times stated: "Here the dulcimer-like Hungarian cimbalom and the bowed lyra color the open-ended framework of a six-part suite."

== Track listing ==
1. "Flying Over The Odra Valley" - 10:59
2. "Gardner" - 8:11
3. "Lark" - 13:20
4. "River" - 16:07
5. "Invitation" - 10:34
6. "Wild Man Dance - 15:14

== Personnel ==
- Charles Lloyd - tenor saxophone
- Gerald Clayton - piano
- Joe Sanders - bass
- Gerald Cleaver - drums
- Socratis Sinopoulos - Greek lyra
- Lukács Miklós - cimbalom
