= Mirror (Charles Lloyd album) =

Studio album by Charles Lloyd
- Released: September 14, 2010
- Recorded: December 2009
- Studio: Santa Barbara Sound Design; Santa Barbara, California
- Genre: Jazz
- Length: 72:54
- Label: ECM; ECM 2176
- Producer: Manfred Eicher

Charles Lloyd chronology
Rabo de Nube (2008)	Mirror (2010)	Athens Concert (2011)

Mirror is an album by jazz saxophonist Charles Lloyd recorded in December 2009 and released on ECM in September the following year.

== Reception ==
The AllMusic review by Thom Jurek awarded the album 4 stars and states "Ultimately, Mirror is another Lloyd triumph. It may not shake the rafters with its kinetics, but it does dazzle with the utterly symbiotic interplay between leader and sidemen."

Professional ratings
Review scores
Source	Rating
Allmusic	4/5 stars

== Track listing ==
All compositions by Charles Lloyd except as indicated

1. "I Fall in Love Too Easily" (Sammy Cahn, Jule Styne) – 5:00
2. "Go Down Moses" (Traditional) – 5:59
3. "Desolation Sound" – 7:03
4. "La Llorona" (Traditional) – 5:35
5. "Caroline, No" (Tony Asher, Brian Wilson) – 4:02
6. "Monk's Mood" (Thelonious Monk) – 5:01
7. "Mirror" – 6:42
8. "Ruby, My Dear" (Monk) – 5:25
9. "The Water is Wide" (Traditional) – 7:19
10. "Lift Every Voice and Sing" (James Weldon Johnson, John Rosamond Johnson) – 4:29
11. "Being and Becoming" – 7:02
12. "Tagi" – 9:17

== Personnel ==
- Charles Lloyd – tenor saxophone, alto saxophone, voice
- Jason Moran – piano
- Reuben Rogers – bass
- Eric Harland – drums, didgeridoo
