= The Water Is Wide (Charles Lloyd album) =

Studio album by Charles Lloyd
- Released: August 21, 2000
- Recorded: December 1999
- Studio: Cello Studios; Los Angeles
- Genre: Jazz
- Length: 68:21
- Label: ECM; ECM 1734
- Producer: Manfred Eicher

Charles Lloyd chronology
Voice in the Night (1999)	The Water Is Wide (2000)	Hyperion with Higgins (2001)

The Water Is Wide is an album by American jazz saxophonist Charles Lloyd recorded in December 1999 and released on ECM August the following year. The quintet features rhythm section John Abercrombie, Brad Mehldau, Larry Grenadier and Billy Higgins, with a guest appearance from bassist Darek Oles. The session, which also produced Hyperion with Higgins (2001), was one of Higgins' last before his death in 2001.

== Reception ==
Professional ratings
Review scores
Source	Rating
AllMusic	4/5 stars
The Penguin Guide to Jazz	3.5/4 stars
Tom Hull	B+

The AllMusic review by David R. Adler awarded the album 4 stars calling it "a glorious amalgam of sound."

The All About Jazz review by Glenn Astarita states, "Charles Lloyd has rarely sounded better as the musicians seemingly interrogate each other’s souls during these sixty-eight enlightening minutes. Without a doubt, The Water Is Wide should find its way into quite a few top ten lists for the year 2000. Highly recommended". In another review for the same website C. Andrew Hovan stated "the chemistry is solid throughout, making Lloyd’s seventh ECM album particularly special."

Willard Jenkins gave the album a positive review in JazzTimes. He wrote, "The Water Is Wide finds Lloyd applying his low-key tenor and lovely unassuming tonality to serene melody making for the most part . . . The warmth that permeates this disc is palpable and real".

== Track listing ==
All compositions by Charles Lloyd except as indicated

1. "Georgia" (Hoagy Carmichael, Stuart Gorrell) - 6:38
2. "The Water Is Wide" (Traditional) - 5:02
3. "Black Butterfly" (Duke Ellington, Irving Mills) - 4:36
4. "Ballade and Allegro" - 3:45
5. "Figure in Blue" - 5:13
6. "Lotus Blossom" (Billy Strayhorn) - 5:39
7. "The Monk and the Mermaid" - 8:35
8. "Song of Her" (Cecil McBee) - 7:37
9. "Lady Day" - 7:29
10. "Heaven" (Ellington) - 4:15
11. "There Is a Balm in Gilead" (Traditional) - 5:13
12. "Prayer" - 4:19

== Personnel ==
=== Musicians ===
- Charles Lloyd – tenor saxophone
- John Abercrombie – guitar
- Brad Mehldau – piano
- Larry Grenadier – double bass
- Billy Higgins – drums

=== Guest ===
- Darek Oles – bass (track 12)
