= All My Relations (album) =

Studio album by Charles Lloyd
- Released: 1995
- Recorded: July 1994
- Studio: Rainbow Studio; Oslo, Norway
- Genre: Jazz
- Length: 70:07
- Label: ECM; ECM 1557
- Producer: Manfred Eicher

Charles Lloyd chronology
The Call (1993)	All My Relations (1995)	Canto (1997)

All My Relations is an album by the jazz saxophonist Charles Lloyd recorded in July 1994 and released on ECM the following year. The quartet features rhythm section Bobo Stenson, Anders Jormin and Billy Hart.

== Reception ==
Professional ratings
Review scores
Source	Rating
AllMusic	4.5/5 stars
Tom Hull	B+
The Penguin Guide to Jazz Recordings	3/4 stars

The AllMusic review by Scott Yanow called the album "a strong effort".

== Track listing ==
All compositions by Charles Lloyd

1. "Piercing the Veil" – 8:31
2. "Little Peace" – 6:35
3. "Thelonious Theonlyus" – 7:48
4. "Cape to Cairo Suite (Hommage to Mandela)" – 15:26
5. "Evanstide, Where Lotus Bloom" – 10:56
6. "All My Relations" – 10:54
7. "Hymne to the Mother" – 8:38
8. "Milarepa" – 1:19

== Personnel ==
- Charles Lloyd – tenor saxophone, flute, Chinese oboe
- Bobo Stenson – piano
- Anders Jormin – double bass
- Billy Hart – drums
