= Notes from Big Sur =

Studio album by Charles Lloyd
- Released: 1992
- Recorded: November 1991
- Studio: Rainbow Studio; Oslo, Norway
- Genre: Jazz
- Length: 60:38
- Label: ECM; ECM 1465
- Producer: Manfred Eicher

Charles Lloyd chronology
Fish Out of Water (1991)	Notes from Big Sur (1992)	Acoustic Masters I (1993)

Notes from Big Sur is an album by American jazz saxophonist Charles Lloyd, recorded in November 1991 and released on ECM April the following year. The quartet feature rhythm section Bobo Stenson, Anders Jormin and Ralph Peterson.

== Reception ==
The AllMusic review by David R. Adler stated: "Notes from Big Sur successfully portrays the California coastline for which it is named—picturesque and soothing, although rugged and at times forbidding."

Professional ratings
Review scores
Source	Rating
AllMusic	3/5 stars
Tom Hull	B+
The Penguin Guide to Jazz Recordings	3.5/4 stars

== Track listing ==
All compositions by Charles Lloyd

1. "Requiem" - 8:00
2. "Sister" - 8:51
3. "Pilgrimage to the Mountain Part 1: Persevere" - 7:22
4. "Sam Song" - 7:54
5. "Takur" - 4:27
6. "Monk in Paris" - 9:38
7. "When Miss Jessye Sings" - 9:55
8. "Pilgrimage to the Mountain Part 2: Surrender" - 4:31

== Personnel ==
- Charles Lloyd – tenor saxophone
- Bobo Stenson – piano
- Anders Jormin – bass
- Ralph Peterson – drums
