= Voice in the Night (album) =

Studio album by Charles Lloyd
- Released: March 9, 1999
- Recorded: May 1998
- Studio: Avatar, New York City
- Genre: Jazz
- Length: 68:17
- Label: ECM; ECM 1674
- Producer: Manfred Eicher

Charles Lloyd chronology
Canto (1998)	Voice in the Night (1999)	The Water Is Wide (2000)

Professional ratings
Review scores
Source	Rating
AllMusic	4/5 stars
The Penguin Guide to Jazz Recordings	4/4 stars

Voice in the Night is an album by jazz saxophonist Charles Lloyd recorded in May 1998 and released on ECM March the following year. The quartet features rhythm section John Abercrombie, Dave Holland and Billy Higgins.

== Reception ==
The AllMusic review by Thom Jurek awarded the album 4 stars and states "Lloyd was going for more of a jazz sound, something more basic and lyrical as opposed to exotic and unusual."

The All About Jazz review by Larry Koenigsberg stated "the most notable feature of his new CD is his return to form, as opposed to merely a return to format. He sounds the best he has since he left his Big Sur retreat to perform and record for ECM." In another review for the same website Douglas Payne stated "Lloyd seems to sound warmer, somewhat romantic—and a touch more inspired than usual... This is a quartet that offers much to explore."

== Track listing ==
All compositions by Charles Lloyd except as indicated

1. "Voice in the Night" – 6:30
2. "God Give Me Strength" (Burt Bacharach, Elvis Costello) – 4:45
3. "Dorotea's Studio" – 7:47
4. "Requiem" – 5:57
5. "Pocket Full of Blues" – 11:41
6. "Homage" – 9:26
7. "Forest Flower: Sunrise/Sunset" – 15:22
8. "A Flower Is a Lovesome Thing" (Billy Strayhorn) – 6:49

== Personnel ==
- Charles Lloyd – tenor saxophone
- John Abercrombie – guitar
- Dave Holland – double bass
- Billy Higgins – drums, percussion
