= Hyperion with Higgins =

Studio album by Charles Lloyd
- Released: August 21, 2001
- Recorded: December 1999
- Studio: Cello Studios; Los Angeles, California
- Genre: Jazz
- Length: 70:21
- Label: ECM; ECM 1784
- Producer: Manfred Eicher

Charles Lloyd chronology
The Water Is Wide (2000)	Hyperion with Higgins (2001)	Lift Every Voice (2002)

Hyperion with Higgins is an album by American jazz saxophonist Charles Lloyd recorded in December 1999—concurrently with The Water Is Wide (2000)—and released by ECM in August the following year. The quintet features rhythm section John Abercrombie, Brad Mehldau, Larry Grenadier and Billy Higgins. The album is a dedication to Higgins, who died in May, three months previously.

== Reception ==
The AllMusic review by David R. Adler awarded the album 4 stars calling it an "exceptionally focused, all-original statement from Charles Lloyd."

The All About Jazz review by Nils Jacobson stated

"The tunes on Hyperion tend to reflect a warm, spiritual energy, though the pulse fairly leaps out in places... It's a beautifully spiritual record, led by a visionary who has cultivated and expanded his own voice for over two decades—and stitched together by a cast of extremely talented and sympathetic characters. Higgins's work here deserves special note; but then again, he always was head and shoulders above his peers. The high drama of Hyperion offers a wide range of emotional intensity. This disc is a must-listen if you liked Water Is Wide. Highly recommended!"

In another review for the same website Mark Corroto stated "Lloyd’s sound just seems to get better with each session. He neither strains nor sweats here laying down graceful passages... Like Coltrane, Lloyd utilizes passion within the confines of his own lyricism. This is a wondrous session."

Professional ratings
Review scores
Source	Rating
The Penguin Guide to Jazz	3.5/4 stars
AllMusic	4/5 stars
Tom Hull	A−

== Track listing ==
All compositions by Charles Lloyd

1. "Dancing Waters, Big Sur to Bahia" - 5:55
2. "Bharati" - 7:01
3. "Secret Life of the Forbidden City" - 10:05
4. "Miss Jessye" - 10:24
5. "Hyperion with Higgins" - 7:20
6. "Darkness on the Delta Suite: Mother Where Art Thou/Robert Johnson on the Banks of the Ganges/Perseverance/Till the River Runs Free/Peace in the Storm" - 12:40
7. "Dervish on the Glory B" - 8:24
8. "The Caravan Moves On" - 8:32

== Personnel ==
- Charles Lloyd – tenor saxophone
- John Abercrombie – guitar
- Brad Mehldau – piano
- Larry Grenadier – bass
- Billy Higgins – drums
