= Charles Lloyd in Europe =

Live album by Charles Lloyd
- Released: March 1968
- Recorded: October 29, 1966
- Genre: Jazz
- Length: 36:37
- Label: Atlantic
- Producer: George Avakian

Charles Lloyd chronology
The Flowering (1966)	Charles Lloyd in Europe (1968)	Love-In (1967)

Charles Lloyd in Europe is a live album by jazz saxophonist Charles Lloyd on the Atlantic label recorded in Norway by the Charles Lloyd Quartet featuring Keith Jarrett, Cecil McBee and Jack DeJohnette.

== Reception ==
The Allmusic review by Thom Jurek awarded the album 3 stars and states "Before his great quartet split at the end of 1968, Charles Lloyd took this band literally to the ends of the earth. As a quartet, they had grown immensely from that first astonishing spark when they toured the summer festivals in 1966. Here they are a seasoned unit, full of nuance, elegance, and many surprises, while having moved their entire musical center over to the pursuit of Lloyd's obsession — incorporating the music of the East into Western jazz".

Professional ratings
Review scores
Source	Rating
Allmusic	3/5 stars
The Penguin Guide to Jazz Recordings	3/4 stars

== Track listing ==
All tracks are written by Charles Lloyd.

No.	Title	Length
1.	"Tagore"	9:48
2.	"Karma"	3:44
3.	"Little Anahid's Day"	6:13
4.	"Manhattan Carousel"	8:40
5.	"European Fantasy"	5:26
6.	"Hej Da!"	2:46

- Recorded on October 29, 1966 in Norway

== Personnel ==
- Charles Lloyd - tenor saxophone, flute
- Keith Jarrett - piano
- Cecil McBee - bass
- Jack DeJohnette - drums

== Production ==
- Meny Bloch - recording engineer
- Stanislaw Zagórski - design
