= Groși =

- Commune
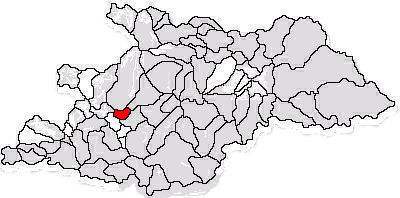
- Location in Maramureș County

- Location in Romania
- Coordinates: 47°37′N 23°37′E
- Country: Romania
- County: Maramureș

Government
  - Mayor (2024–2028): Florin-Daniel Boltea (PNL)
- Area: 23.53 km^{2} (9.08 sq mi)
- Elevation: 284 m (932 ft)
- Population (2021-12-01): 3,641
  - Density: 154.7/km^{2} (400.8/sq mi)
- Time zone: UTC+02:00 (EET)
  - Summer (DST): UTC+03:00 (EEST)
- Postal code: 437165
- Area code: +40 x59
- Vehicle reg.: MM
- Website: primariagrosi.ro

Groși (Hungarian: Tőkésbánya) is a commune in Maramureș County, Romania. It is composed of three villages: Groși, Ocoliș (Feketefalu), and Satu Nou de Jos (Alsóújfalu).

The commune lies on the banks of the Lăpuș River. It is located in the western part of the county, just south of the county seat, Baia Mare. Groși is crossed by national road DN18B, which runs from Cășeiu, 79 km (49 mi) to the south, to Baia Mare, 5 km (3.1 mi) to the north.

Historical population
Year	Pop.	±%
1880	1,782	—
1900	2,152	+20.8%
1910	2,362	+9.8%
1930	2,492	+5.5%
1956	2,870	+15.2%
1977	2,953	+2.9%
1992	2,479	−16.1%
2002	2,533	+2.2%
2011	2,857	+12.8%
2021	3,641	+27.4%
Source: Census data

At the 2011 census, the commune had a population of 2,857 people, of which 94.71% were Romanians and 1.51% Hungarians. At the 2021 census, Groși had a population of 3,641; of those, 90.74% were Romanians and 1.37% Hungarians.

== Natives ==
- Dumitru Fărcaș (1938–2018), tarogot player.
