= Charles Lloyd (jazz musician) =

American jazz musician (born 1938)

- Lloyd at the 2026 Montreux Jazz Festival

Background information
- Born: March 15, 1938 (age 88); Memphis, Tennessee, U.S.
- Genre: Jazz
- Occupations: Musician, composer
- Instruments: Tenor saxophone, flute
- Years active: 1959–present
- Labels: Atlantic, Blue Note, Columbia, ECM, Pacific Arts
- Formerly of: Celebration
- Website: www.charleslloyd.com

Charles Lloyd (born March 15, 1938) is an American jazz musician and composer. He primarily plays tenor saxophone and flute and occasionally other reed instruments, including alto saxophone and the Hungarian tárogató. Lloyd's primary band since 2007 has been a quartet including pianist Jason Moran, acoustic bassist Reuben Rogers, and drummer Eric Harland.

== Early life and education ==
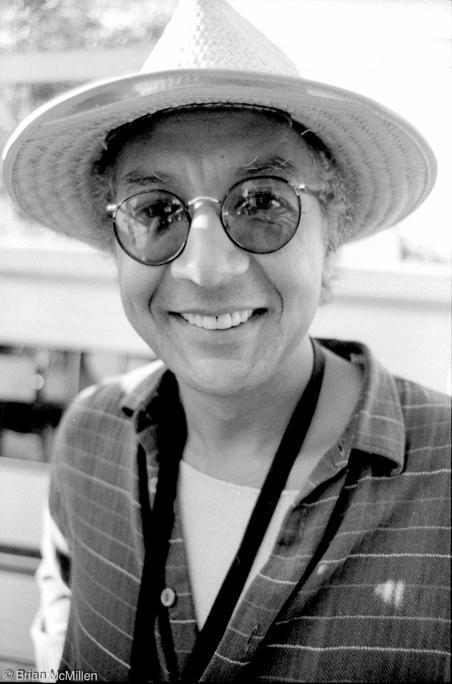
Lloyd at the Russian River Jazz Festival in Guerneville, California in 1981

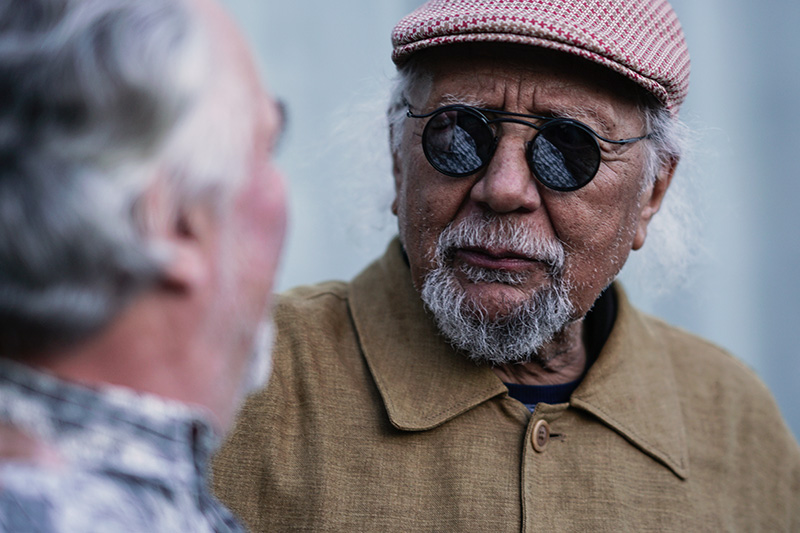
Lloyd at the Copenhagen Jazz Festival in 2018

Lloyd was born in Memphis, Tennessee on March 15, 1938. He grew up in Memphis, where he was exposed to blues, gospel, and jazz music. He is of African, Cherokee, Mongolian, and Irish ancestry. He was given his first saxophone at the age of nine and was riveted by 1940s radio broadcasts by Charlie Parker, Coleman Hawkins, Lester Young, Billie Holiday and Duke Ellington. His early teachers included pianist Phineas Newborn, Jr. and saxophonist Irvin Reason. His closest childhood friend was trumpeter Booker Little. As a teenager Lloyd played jazz with saxophonist George Coleman, Harold Mabern, and Frank Strozier, and was a sideman for blues artists Bobby "Blue" Bland, Howlin' Wolf and B.B. King, and R & B singer Johnny Ace.

In 1956, Lloyd left Memphis for Los Angeles to earn a degree in music at the University of Southern California, where he studied with Bartók specialist Halsey Stevens. At night, he played in jazz clubs with Ornette Coleman, Billy Higgins, Scott LaFaro, Don Cherry, Charlie Haden, Eric Dolphy, Bobby Hutcherson and other leading west coast jazz artists. He also was a member of Gerald Wilson's big band.

== Career ==
In 1960, Lloyd was invited to become music director of Chico Hamilton's group, when Eric Dolphy left to join Charles Mingus's band. The Hungarian guitarist Gábor Szabó, bassist Albert "Sparky" Stinson, and trombonist George Bohanon soon joined Lloyd in the band. Hamilton's albums on Impulse!, Passin' Thru and Man from Two Worlds, featured music arranged and written almost entirely by Lloyd. He collaborated with Nigerian drummer Babatunde Olatunji, with whom he played when he was not on the road with Hamilton. He joined the Cannonball Adderley Sextet in 1964, and performed with Nat Adderley, Joe Zawinul, Sam Jones and Louis Hayes. For two years he remained with Cannonball Adderley, whom he credits in his own development as a leader.

In 1964, Lloyd signed with CBS Records and began to record as a leader. His Columbia recordings, Discovery! (1964), and Of Course, Of Course (1965), led to his being voted DownBeat magazine's "New Star." He was also one of the well known and notable supporting musicians of The Beach Boys in their live performances. Of Course, Of Course was reissued by Mosaic Records in 2006.

=== Quartet ===
In New York in 1966, Lloyd formed his "classic quartet" with drummer Jack DeJohnette, pianist Keith Jarrett and bassist Cecil McBee (continued on by Ron McClure). The Quartet's 1966 live album, Forest Flower, recorded at the Monterey Jazz Festival, was one of the most successful jazz recordings of the mid-1960s, building a heterogeneous audience of rock as well as jazz fans in the prospering hippie counterculture. The Quartet toured across America and Europe. In 1967, Lloyd was voted "Jazz Artist of the Year" by DownBeat magazine. In 1967, Lloyd and the Quartet performed at the Tallinn Jazz Festival in Estonia, then part of the Soviet Union. On the same trip, they traveled to Leningrad and performed at two venues in Russia with the assistance of the Leningrad Jazz Club and the Moscow Jazz Club.

Lloyd is given credit for anticipating world music by incorporating music from other cultures into his compositions, as early as the late 1950s. He describes his music as having "danced on many shores". Peter Watrous stated, "Lloyd has come up with a strange and beautiful distillation of the American experience, part abandoned and wild, part immensely controlled and sophisticated."

Despite recording several albums during the 1970s and occasionally appearing as a sideman, he practically disappeared from the jazz scene. While practicing Transcendental Meditation in the 1970s, Lloyd played extensively with The Beach Boys, both on their studio recordings and as a member of their touring band; several members of the group shared his affinity for the technique. Lloyd recorded at Brian Wilson's home studio during this period and has recalled that Brian and several other members of The Beach Boys performed on these recordings, some of which (e.g. "All Life Is One") were included on Lloyd's 1971 LP 'Warm Waters', and which also featured Quicksilver Messenger Service lead guitarist John Cipollina. Lloyd also was a member of Celebration, a band consisting of members of the Beach Boys' touring band as well as Mike Love and Al Jardine. Celebration released two albums.

Lloyd returned to the jazz world in 1981 when he toured with Michel Petrucciani. British jazz critic Brian Case called Lloyd's return "one of the events of the 1980s." The group produced a special edition cassette, Night Blooming Jasmine, and two live records, Montreux 82 and A Night in Copenhagen, which also features Bobby McFerrin. After the tour, Lloyd again retreated to Big Sur.

In 1986, after being hospitalized with a nearly fatal medical condition, Lloyd rededicated himself to music. When he regained his strength in 1988, he formed a new quartet with Swedish pianist Bobo Stenson. When Lloyd returned to the Montreux Festival in 1988, Swiss critic Yvan Ischer wrote: "To see and hear Charles Lloyd in concert is always an event, not only because this saxophonist has been at quite a few crossroads, but also because he seems to hold an impalpable truth which makes him a thoroughly original musician...This is what we call grace."

=== Recording for ECM ===
In 1989, Lloyd made his first recording for ECM Records, Fish Out of Water. Manfred Eicher, ECM's founder and producer, compared the recording to a Giacometti painting, saying, "I really believe this is the refined essence of what music should be. All the meat is gone, only the bones remain." From 1989, Lloyd toured and recorded for ECM. His albums for the label include Canto, Voice in the Night, The Water Is Wide (featuring Brad Mehldau, John Abercrombie, Larry Grenadier and Billy Higgins), Lift Every Voice (featuring Geri Allen), and the live Rabo de Nube (with Jason Moran).

Lloyd's albums for ECM contain elements of world music and experimentation, as in the duets on Which Way Is East with his longtime friend, Billy Higgins.

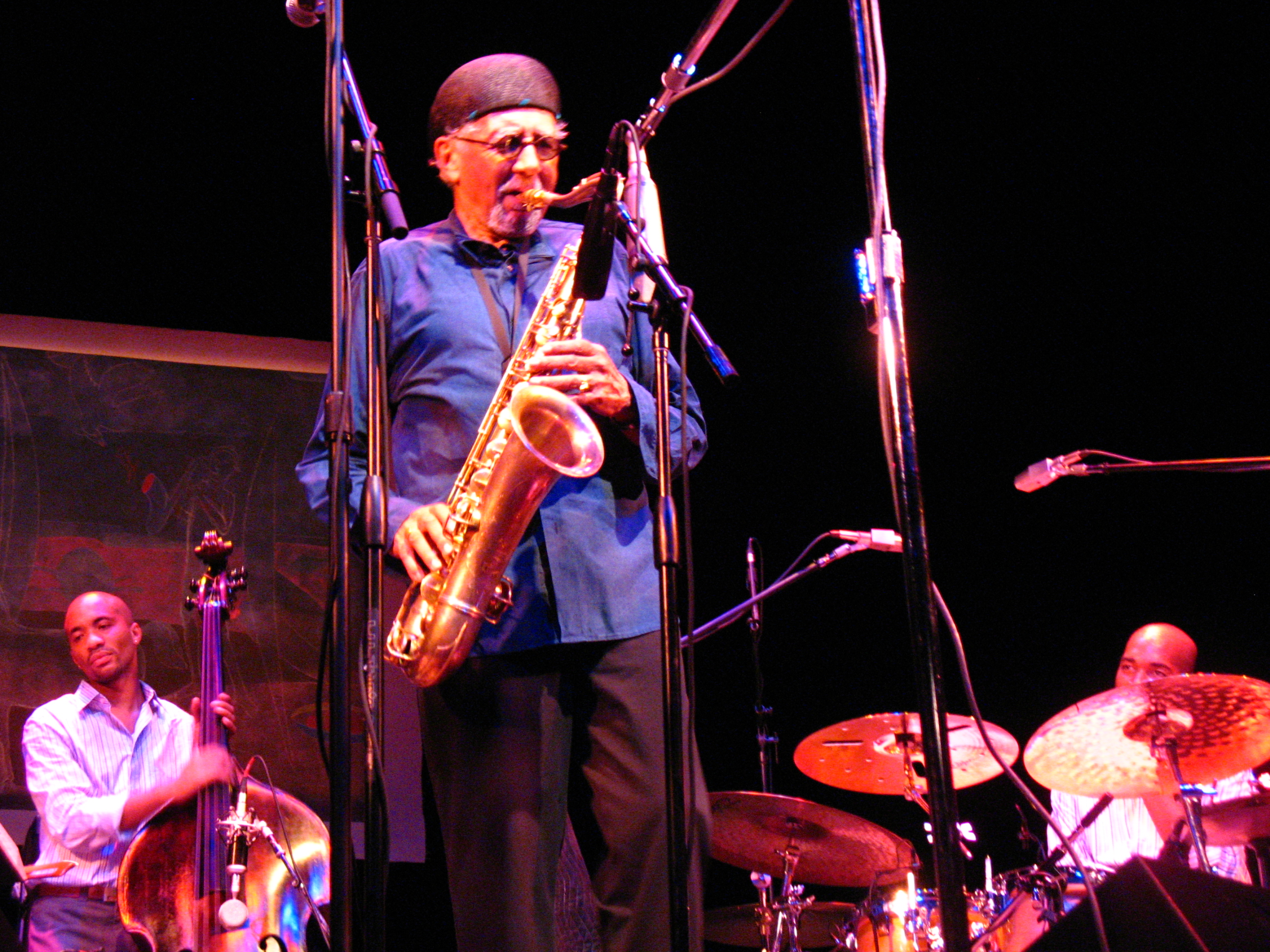
Lloyd with Reuben Rogers and Eric Harland in Santa Barbara, California in 2006

Mirror, his second recording with the New Quartet (2010), has been called a "Charles Lloyd classic." Rabo de Nube, also on ECM, captured the quartet "live" at its inception, and was voted No. 1 recording for the 2008 JazzTimes Reader's and Critic's Poll.

Lloyd collaborated with the classical Greek singer, Maria Farantouri, for a concert at the Herodion Theater at the Acropolis. Ta Nea. A newspaper in Athens, stated "Music has no borders...The audience was filled with a Dionysian ecstasy. While the music had reminiscences of a Hypiros fair, at the same time it took you to the heart of New York City." This concert was recorded and Athens Concert was released by ECM in 2011.

Lloyd celebrated his 75th birthday in 2013 with concerts in the Temple of Dendur at the Metropolitan Museum of Art in New York City and the Kennedy Center Concert Hall in Washington, D.C. On June 25, 2014, it was announced that Lloyd was to receive the NEA Jazz Masters Award 2015. Lloyd was the Honoree at the 2014 Monterey Jazz Festival Jazz Legends Gala, hosted by Herbie Hancock. Lloyd was the recipient of the 2014 Alfa Jazz Fest International Music Award.

=== Recording for Blue Note ===
In January 2015, it was announced that Lloyd had signed with Blue Note Records. Wild Man Dance, a live recording of a long-form suite commissioned by the Jazztopad Festival in Wroclaw, Poland, was released in April 2015. Lloyd was presented with an honorary Doctor of Music degree from the Berklee College of Music in a ceremony at the Umbria Jazz Festival in July 2015. In 2016, Lloyd was inducted into the Memphis Music Hall of Fame.

Since 2015, Lloyd has recorded ten albums for Blue Note, including 2024's The Sky Will Still Be There Tomorrow, which was selected by DownBeat critics as album of the year. Lloyd was also elected into the DownBeat Jazz Hall of Fame in 2024.

In March 2021, Blue Note released Tone Poem, the third album by Charles Lloyd & the Marvels. In addition to three new Lloyd originals, it features compositions by Leonard Cohen, Ornette Coleman, Thelonious Monk, Bola de Nieve, and Gábor Szabó.

== Personal life ==
Lloyd lives in Southern California with his wife, Dorothy Darr.

== Discography ==
=== As leader/co-leader ===
Recording date	Title	Label	Year released	Notes
1964-05-27, -29	Discovery!	Columbia	1964	
1962-02-19, 1964-05-08, 1965-03-08, 1965-10-15	Nirvana	Columbia	1968	
1964-05-08, 1965-03-08, 1965-10-15	Of Course, of Course	Columbia	1965	
1965-09-03, 1965-other date	Manhattan Stories	Resonance	2014	Live
1966-03-20	Dream Weaver	Atlantic	1966	
1966-09-08, -18	Forest Flower	Atlantic	1967	Live
1966-07-23, -24; 1966-10-29	The Flowering	Atlantic	1971	Live
1966-10-29	Charles Lloyd in Europe	Atlantic	1968	Live
1967-01-27	Love-In	Atlantic	1967	Live
1967-01-27	Journey Within	Atlantic	1967	Live
1967-03-14	Charles Lloyd in the Soviet Union	Atlantic	1970	Live
1967-06-18	Montreux Jazz Festival 1967	TCB	2017	[2CD] Live
1968-11-15	Soundtrack	Atlantic	1969	Live
1970-07-09	Moon Man	Kapp	1970	
1971	Warm Waters	Kapp	1971	
1972	Waves	A&M	1972	
1973	Geeta	A&M	1973	
1978	Weavings	Pacific Arts	1978?	
1979	Koto	ADC	1979	Also released by Unity as Pathless Path
1979	Big Sur Tapestry	Pacific Arts	1979	
1979	Autumn in New York	Destiny	1979	
1979	Morning Sunrise	ADC	1979	
1982-07-25	Montreux 82	Elektra/Musician	1983	Live
1983-07-11	A Night in Copenhagen	Blue Note	1985	Live
1989–07	Fish Out of Water	ECM	1990	
1991–11	Notes from Big Sur	ECM	1992	
1993–07	Acoustic Masters I	Atlantic	1994	
1993–07	The Call	ECM	1993	
1994–07	All My Relations	ECM	1995	
1996–12	Canto	ECM	1997	
1998–05	Voice in the Night	ECM	1999	
1999–12	The Water Is Wide	ECM	2000	
1999–12	Hyperion with Higgins	ECM	2001	
2001–01	Which Way Is East	ECM	2004	
2002–02	Lift Every Voice	ECM	2002	
2004–01	Jumping the Creek	ECM	2005	
2004-05-23	Sangam	ECM	2006	Live
2007-04-27	Rabo de Nube	ECM	2008	Live
2009–12	Mirror	ECM	2010	
2010–06	Athens Concert	ECM	2011	Co-led with Maria Farantouri. Live
2012–04	Hagar's Song	ECM	2013	Co-led duo with Jason Moran
2013-11-24	Wild Man Dance	Blue Note	2015	Live at Jazztopad Festival, Wrocław, Poland
2015-04-27, -28	I Long to See You	Blue Note	2016	with The Marvels
2016-06-30, 2016-07-29	Passin' Thru	Blue Note	2017	Live at Montreux Jazz Festival and The Lensic Theater, Santa Fe, New Mexico
2017-04-14, -15, 2017-09-09, -10	Vanished Gardens	Blue Note	2018	with The Marvels and Lucinda Williams
2018-03-15	8: Kindred Spirits (Live from the Lobero)	Blue Note	2020	Live at the Lobero Theatre, Santa Barbara
2020?	Tone Poem	Blue Note	2021	with The Marvels
2018-12-04	Trio: Chapel	Blue Note	2022	with Bill Frisell and Thomas Morgan
2020-09-09	Trio: Ocean	Blue Note	2022	with Gerald Clayton and Anthony Wilson
2020–09	Trio: Sacred Thread	Blue Note	2022	with Julian Lage and Zakir Hussain
2024–03	The Sky Will Still Be There Tomorrow	Blue Note	2024	with Jason Moran, Larry Grenadier and Brian Blade
2025–03	Figure in Blue	Blue Note	2025	with Jason Moran and Marvin Sewell

Main source:

=== As sideman ===
Release date	Title	Label	Notes
With Cannonball Adderley
1964	Cannonball Adderley Live!	Capitol	
1964	Cannonball Adderley's Fiddler on the Roof	Capitol	
1991	Radio Nights	Night/Virgin	
With Canned Heat
1971	Historical Figures and Ancient Heads	United Artists	Appears on two tracks
With Celebration
1978	Almost Summer: Music from the Original Motion Picture	MCA	
1979	Celebration	Pacific Arts	
1979	Disco Celebration	ADC	
With Chico Hamilton
1960	Bye Bye Birdie-Irma La Douce	Columbia	
1960	The Chico Hamilton Special	Columbia	
1962	Drumfusion	Columbia	
1962	Transfusion	Studio West	
1962	Passin' Thru	Impulse!	
1963	A Different Journey	Reprise	
1964	Man from Two Worlds	Impulse!	
1965	Chic Chic Chico	Impulse!	Appears on only one track
With Mark Isham
1998	Afterglow: Music from the Motion Picture	Columbia	
With Harvey Mandel
1972	The Snake	Janus	Appears on only one track
With Les McCann
1961	Les McCann Sings	Pacific Jazz	Appears on four tracks
With Roger McGuinn
1973	Roger McGuinn	Columbia	Appears on two tracks
With Joe Sample
1995	Old Places, Old Faces	Warner Bros.	Appears on three tracks
With Gábor Szabó
1973	Gábor Szabó Live	Blue Thumb	Appears on only one track
With The Beach Boys
1971	Surf's Up	Brother/Reprise	Appears on only one track
1973	Holland	Brother/Reprise	
1976	15 Big Ones	Brother/Reprise	Appears on only one track
1978	M.I.U. Album	Brother/Reprise	
With The Doors
1972	Full Circle	Elektra	Appears on "Verdilac" and "The Piano Bird"
With William Truckaway
1976	Breakaway	Reprise	

== Filmography ==
- The Monk and the Mermaid - A documentary film by Fara C & Giuseppe De Vecchi - Oleo films - Forest Farm + Art - Mezzo TV - 2008
- Arrows Into Infinity - A film by Dorothy Darr & Jeffery Morse - Forest Farm + Art - 2013
- LOVE LONGING LOSS: At Home with Charles Lloyd During a Year of the Plague - A film by Dorothy Darr - Pierre Boulez SAAL - 2021
