= Autumn in New York (Charles Lloyd album) =

Studio album by Charles Lloyd Quartet
- Released: 1979
- Recorded: 1979
- Studio: Santa Barbara Sounds Studios, Santa Barbara, CA
- Genre: Jazz
- Length: 33:28
- Label: Destiny; DLA-10003
- Producer: Charles Lloyd

Charles Lloyd chronology
Big Sur Tapestry (1979)	Autumn in New York (1979)	Montreux 82 (1983)

Autumn in New York (subtitled Volume One, but there never were any subsequent volumes) is an album by saxophonist Charles Lloyd recorded in 1979 and released on Mike Love's Destiny label.

== Reception ==
Professional ratings
Review scores
Source	Rating
Allmusic	3/5 stars

Allmusic's Scott Yanow said: "This little-known effort is better than some of Charles Lloyd's infrequent projects of the 1970s, for he sticks to tenor and interprets eight standards melodically and with taste".

== Track listing ==
1. "Autumn in New York" (Vernon Duke) – 3:05
2. "As Time Goes By" (Herman Hupfeld) – 4:20
3. "Wait till You See Her" (Richard Rodgers, Lorenz Hart) – 4:20
4. "Nancy (with the Laughing Face)" (Jimmy Van Heusen, Phil Silvers) – 5:17
5. "Naima" (John Coltrane) – 3:55
6. "Stella by Starlight" (Victor Young) – 4:22
7. "But Beautiful" (Van Heusen, Johnny Burke) – 4:21
8. "Pensativa" (Clare Fischer) – 4:08

== Personnel ==
- Charles Lloyd – tenor saxophone, arranger
- Tom Grant – piano
- Kevin Brandon – bass guitar
- Kim Calkins – percussion
- Suzanne Wallach – vocals
- String section arranged and conducted by Clare Fischer
