= Eric Harland =

American jazz drummer (born 1978)

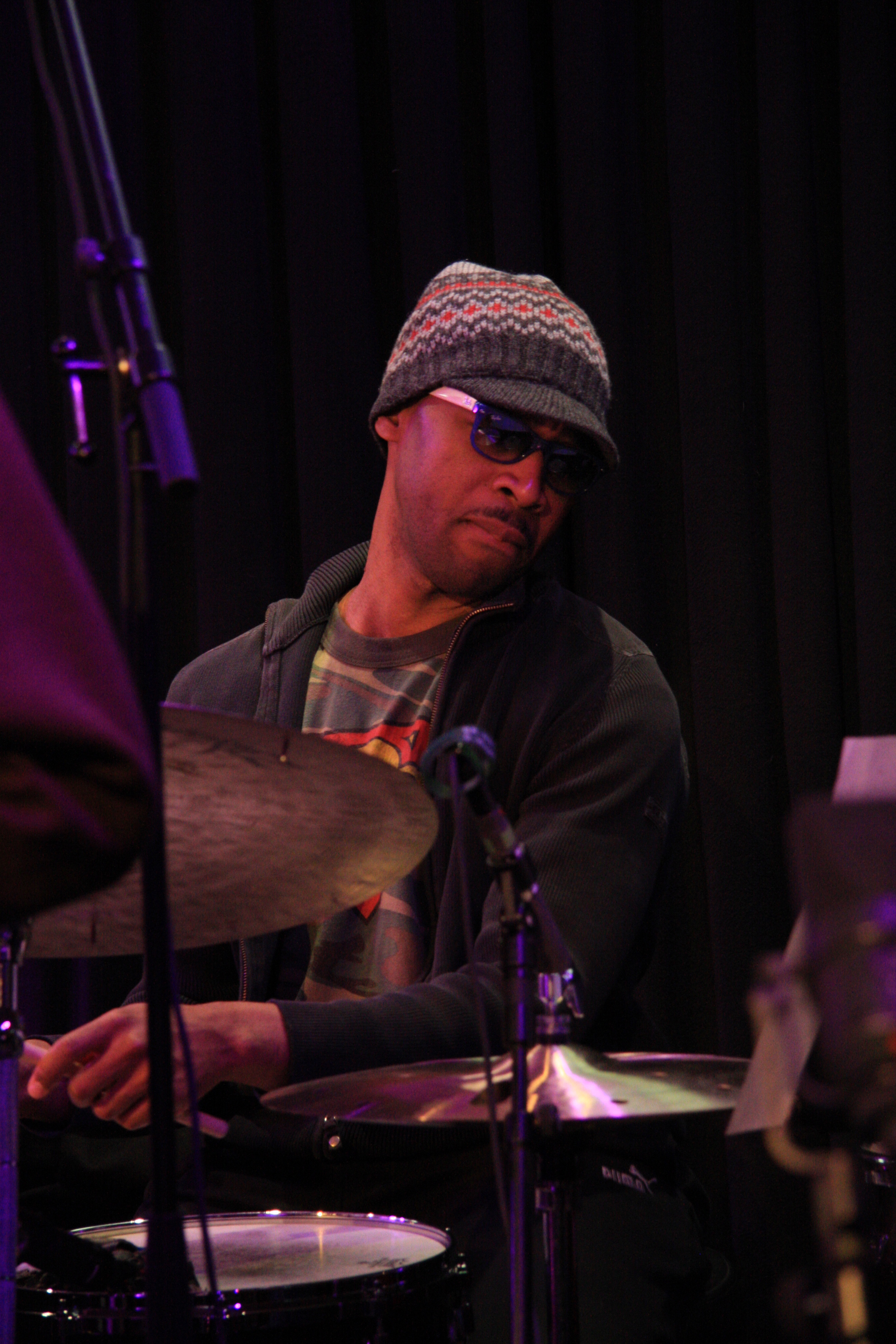
- Harland performing in Munich, Germany with the SFJAZZ Collective on March 10, 2010

Background information
- Born: Eric Dusean Harland; November 8, 1976 (age 49); Houston, Texas, U.S.
- Genres: Jazz
- Occupations: Musician, bandleader
- Instrument: Drums

Eric Harland (born November 8, 1976, in Houston, Texas) is an American jazz drummer.

In addition to leading his own group, he is a member of Charles Lloyd's Quartet, Dave Holland's Prism, James Farm with Joshua Redman, and Taylor Eigsti's Trio.

He has also been a member of McCoy Tyner's Quartet, Kurt Rosenwinkel's Standards Trio, Aaron Goldberg's Trio, Julian Lage's Trio, Chris Potter's Trio, and Terence Blanchard's Quintet, among other groups. He was a member of the SFJAZZ Collective from 2005 to 2012.

== Biography ==
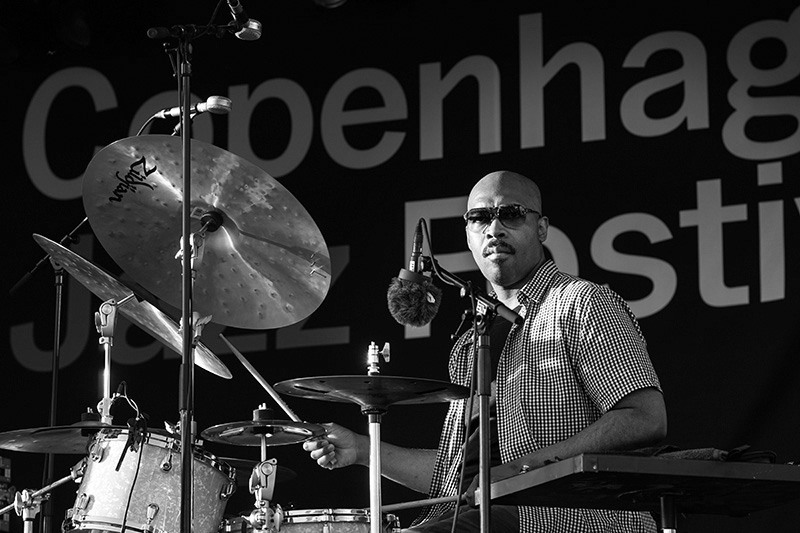
Harland at the Copenhagen Jazz Festival, 2018

Harland began his professional career in 1993, playing locally in Houston, Texas, as he finished high school at the High School for the Performing and Visual Arts, where many notable performers have studied. Harland won first chair in 1992–93 with the Regional and All-State Texas Jazz Band. He received a special Citation for Outstanding Musicianship in 1994 from the International Association for Jazz Education. During a workshop in high school, Wynton Marsalis encouraged Harland to study in New York City.

After graduation, Harland attended the Manhattan School of Music with a full scholarship in their music program. After music school, he went on to study theology at Houston Baptist University (College of Biblical Studies) and was subsequently ordained as a Minister.

Harland has been featured on over 80 recordings with various artists. Among these recordings, Let's Get Lost and Wandering Moon (Terence Blanchard), Back East (Joshua Redman), and Land of Giants (McCoy Tyner) were nominated for Grammy Awards. With Blanchard and Spike Lee, Harland has performed in 18 motion picture movie scores, including The Caveman's Valentine, Original Sin, People I Know, and Dark Blue.

Harland has toured and recorded with Mark Turner, Larry Grenadier, Ravi Coltrane, Wynton Marsalis, Betty Carter, Joe Henderson, Walter Smith III, Aaron Parks, John Patitucci, Zakir Hussain, and others.

In DownBeat's 65th Annual Readers Poll, Harland was included on the short list of the world's most recognized drummers, along with Elvin Jones and Roy Haynes. He also won the 2008 and 2009 Critics Polls for "Rising Star on the Drums". Harland was featured in the September 2002 and November 2009 issues of Modern Drummer.

Harland released his debut album, Voyager: Live by Night, in late 2010. It features Walter Smith III, Julian Lage, Taylor Eigsti, and Harish Raghavan.

Harland's second album, Vipassana, was released on August 11, 2014.

In April 2017, Harland opened a state-of-the-art recording studio in New York City called GSI Studios, with partners Daniel Rovin and Austin White.

== Discography ==
=== As leader ===
- Voyager: Live by Night (Space Time, 2011)
- Vipassana (GSI, 2014)
- 13th Floor (GSI, 2018)

=== As group ===
SFJAZZ Collective

- Live 2005: 2nd Annual Concert Tour – The Works of John Coltrane (SFJAZZ, 2005)[2CD]
- Live 2006: 3rd Annual Concert Tour – The Music of Herbie Hancock (SFJAZZ, 2006)[2CD]
- Live 2007: 4th Annual Concert Tour – The Works of Thelonious Monk (SFJAZZ, 2007)[2CD]
- Live 2008: 5th Annual Concert Tour – The Works of Wayne Shorter (SFJAZZ, 2008)[3CD]
- Wonder (SFJAZZ, 2012) – compilation

James Farm
With Joshua Redman, Aaron Parks, and Matt Penman

- James Farm (Nonesuch, 2011)
- City Folk (Nonesuch, 2014)

=== As sideman ===
With Terence Blanchard

- Wandering Moon (Sony, 2000) – recorded in 1999
- Let's Get Lost (Sony, 2001)
- Bounce (Blue Note, 2003)

With Ravi Coltrane

- From the Round Box (RCA Victor, 2000) – recorded in 1999
- Spirit Fiction (Blue Note, 2012)

With Taylor Eigsti

- Let It Come to You (Concord, 2008)
- Daylight at Midnight (Concord, 2010)
- Tree Falls (GSI, 2021)

With Aaron Goldberg

- Turning Point (J-Curve, 1999)
- Unfolding (J-Curve, 2001)
- Worlds (Sunnyside, 2006)
- Home (Sunnyside, 2010)
- Bienestan (Sunnyside, 2011)
- The Now (Sunnyside, 2014)

With Jimmy Greene

- True Life Stories (Criss Cross, 2006)
- Mission Statement (Sunnyside, 2009)

With Rigmor Gustafsson

- Close to You (ACT, 2004)
- Alone with You (ACT, 2007)

With Dave Holland

- 2007: Pass It On (Dare2, 2008)
- 2012: Prism (Dare2, 2013)
- 2015: Aziza (Dare2, 2016)

With Rodney Jones

- Right Now (Minor Music, 1996)
- The "X" Field (MusicMasters, 1996)
- The Undiscovered Few (Blue Note, 1999)

With Stephanie K.

- Subterranean Dream (Musicom, 2007)

With Kathy Kosins

- Vintage (Mahogany, 2005)
- Uncovered Soul (Maristar, 2018)

With Charles Lloyd

- Jumping the Creek (ECM, 2005) – recorded in 2004
- Sangam (ECM, 2006)
- Rabo de Nube (ECM, 2008)
- Mirror (ECM, 2010)
- Athens Concert (ECM, 2011)
- I Long to See You (Blue Note, 2016)
- Passin' Thru (Blue Note, 2017)
- Vanished Gardens (Blue Note, 2018)
- 8: Kindred Spirits (Live from the Lobero) (Blue Note, 2019)

With Greg Osby

- Further Ado (Blue Note, 1997)
- Inner Circle (Blue Note, 2002)

With Chris Potter

- The Sirens (ECM, 2013)
- Circuits (Edition, 2019)
- Sunrise Reprise (Edition, 2021)

With Kurt Rosenwinkel

- The Remedy (ArtistShare, 2008)[2CD] – live recorded in2006
- Reflections (Wommusic, 2009)

With Mark Shim

- Mind Over Matter (Blue Note, 1998)
- Turbulent Flow (Blue Note, 2000)

With Alex Sipiagin

- Destinations Unknown (Criss Cross, 2011)
- Overlooking Moments (Criss Cross, 2013)
- Balance 38-58 (Criss Cross, 2015)
- Moments Captured (Criss Cross, 2017)
- NoFo Skies (Blue Room Music, 2019)

With Walter Smith III

- Casually Introducing (Fresh Sound, 2006)
- III (Criss Cross, 2010)
- Twio (Whirlwind, 2018)

With Dayna Stephens

- The Timeless Now (CTA, 2007)
- Peace (Sunnyside, 2014)
- Liberty (Contagious Music, 2020)

With Baptiste Trotignon

- Share (Naive, 2008)
- Suite... (Naive, 2009)

With McCoy Tyner

- Land of Giants (Telarc, 2003) – recorded in 2002
- Afro Blue (Telarc, 2007) – compilation

With others

- Joey Alexander, Eclipse (Motema, 2018) – recorded in 2017
- Diego Barber, One Minute Later (Sunnyside, 2017)
- Steve Barry, In the Waves (Earshift Music, 2023)
- Monika Borzym, Girl Talk (Sony, 2011)
- Zach Brock, Almost Never Was (Criss Cross, 2012)
- Donald Brown, Fast Forward to the Past (Space Time, 2008)
- Billy Childs, Rebirth (Mack Avenue, 2017)
- Theo Croker, Star People Nation (Masterworks, 2019)
- Lars Danielsson, Tarantella (ACT, 2009) – recorded in 2008
- Stefano di Battista, Trouble Shootin (Blue Note, 2007)
- Liberty Ellman, Tactiles (Pi, 2003)
- John Escreet, Learn to Live (Blue Room Music, 2018)
- Kenny Garrett, Standard of Language (Warner Bros., 2003)
- Stefon Harris, Black Action Figure (Blue Note, 1999)
- Jose James, Yesterday I Had the Blues (Blue Note, 2015)
- Sara Leib, Secret Love (OA2, 2012)
- Michael Leonhart, Suite Extracts Vol. 1 (Sunnyside, 2019)
- Lionel Loueke, Close Your Eyes (Newvelle, 2018)
- Takashi Matsunaga, Today (Somethin' Else, 2004)
- Ross McHenry, Nothing Remains Unchanged (First Word, 2020)
- Bill Mobley, Moodscape (Space Time, 2007)
- Jason Moran, Soundtrack to Human Motion (Blue Note, 1999) – recorded in 1998
- Mike Moreno, Lotus (World Culture Music, 2015)
- Wolfgang Muthspiel, Where the River Goes (ECM, 2018)
- Aaron Parks, Invisible Cinema (Blue Note, 2008)
- Joshua Redman, Back East (Nonesuch, 2007)
- Bob Reynolds, Can't Wait for Perfect (Fresh Sound, 2006)
- Edward Simon, The Process (Criss Cross, 2002)
- Shayna Steele, Rise (Ropeadope, 2015)
- Helen Sung, Going Express (Sunnyside, 2011)
- John Swana, On Target (Criss Cross, 2003)
- Gregory Tardy, Serendipity (Impulse!, 1998)
- Jacky Terrasson, Smile (Blue Note, 2002)
- Myron Walden, Hypnosis (NYC 1996)
- Ben Wendel, The Seasons (Motema, 2018)
- Yelena Eckemoff, Lonely Man and His Fish (L & H Production, 2023)

== Filmography ==
- 2000: Bamboozled
- 2001: Bojangles
- 2001: Original Sin
- 2001: The Caveman's Valentine
- 2002: People I Know
- 2002: Dark Blue
- 2008: Pig Hunt
- 2022: Euphoria
