= Reuben Rogers =

Jazz bassist from the U.S. Virgin Islands

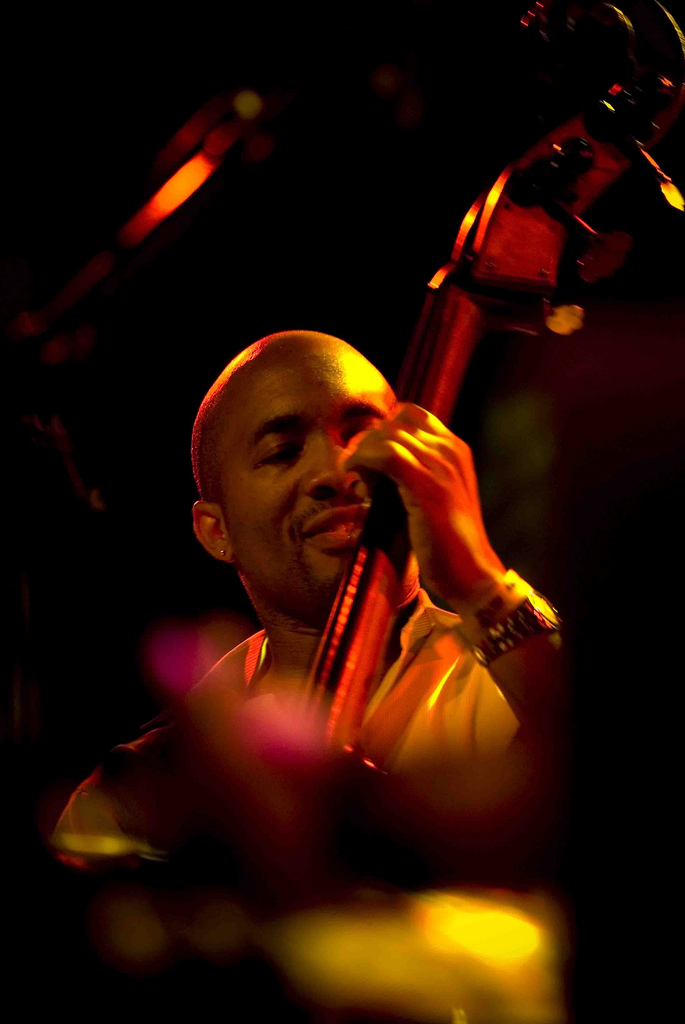
- Reuben Rogers 2008 at the Northsea Jazz Festival

Background information
- Born: Reuben Renwick Rogers; November 15, 1974 (age 51); St. Thomas, Virgin Islands, U.S.
- Genres: Jazz, reggae, world
- Occupations: Musician, educator
- Instruments: Double bass, electric bass guitar
- Years active: 1992–present
- Website: www.reubenrogers.com

Reuben Renwick Rogers (born 15th November 1974 in Saint Thomas on U.S. Virgin Islands) is an American jazz bassist, composer and educator.

== Biography ==
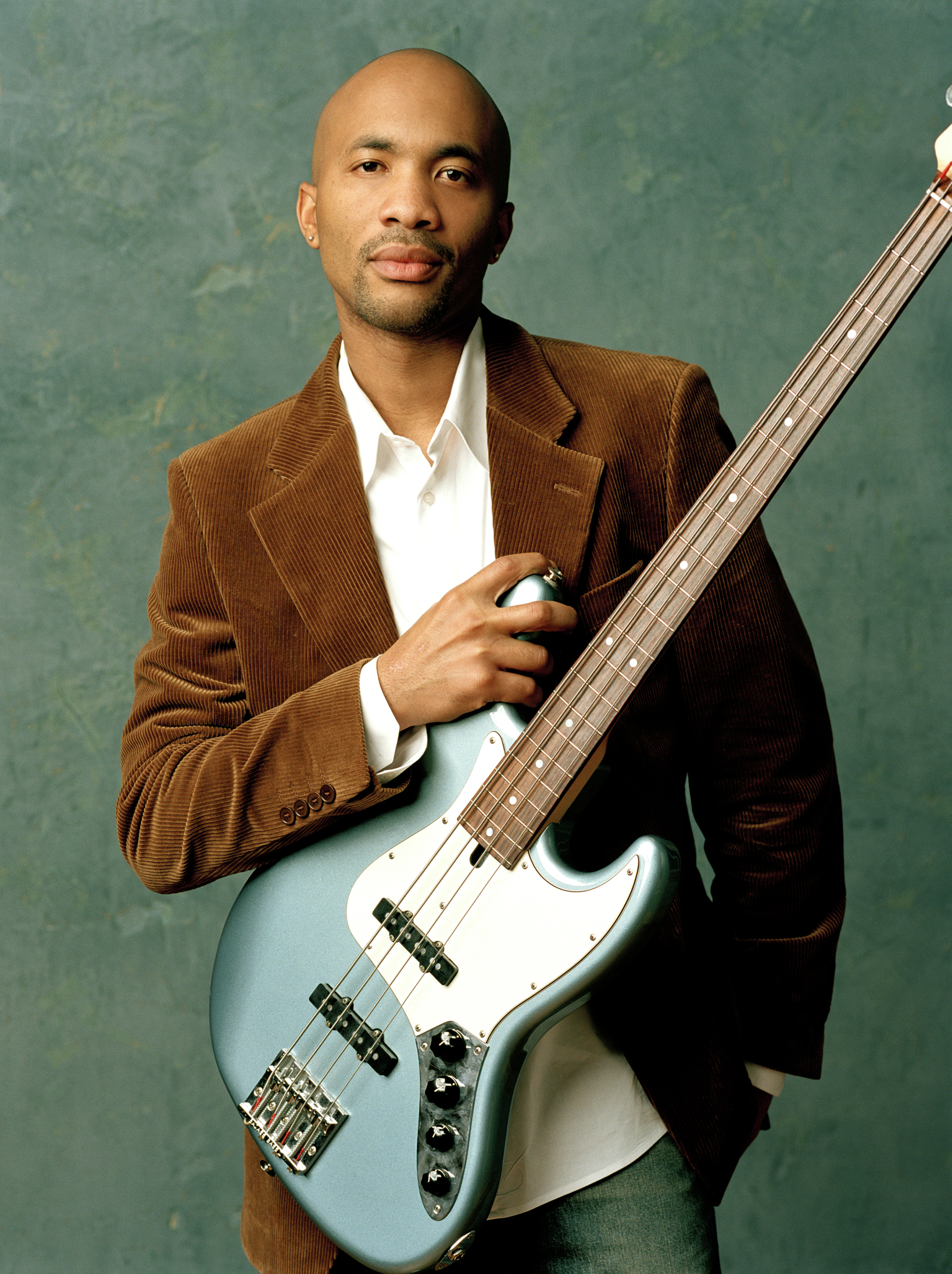
Reuben Rogers 2006

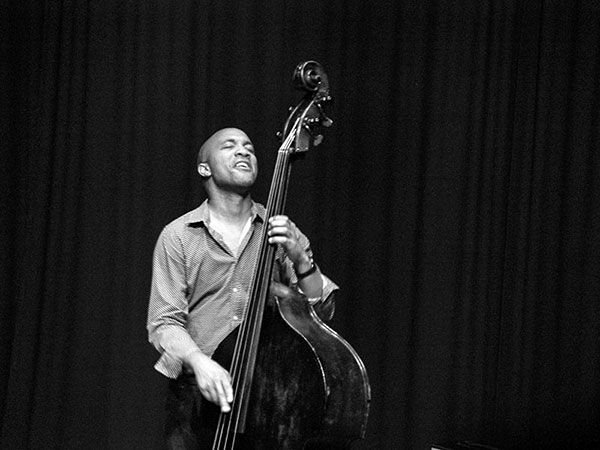
Reuben Rogers in Aarhus Denmark 2013

Born November 15, 1974, and raised in the Virgin Islands, Rogers was exposed to varieties of music that included calypso, reggae, gospel and jazz. In his formative years, Rogers received encouragement from his parents to explore his musical talent. He began with the clarinet, experimented with the piano, drums, and guitar, and at the age of 14 found his true passion in the bass.

Under the surveillance of his high school band teacher, Georgia Francis, Rogers studied jazz with fellow Virgin Islanders Ron Blake and Dion Parson. Rogers received awards, grants, and scholarships from the St. Thomas Arts Council and other local organizations. This opened the door for his summer studies at Interlochen Arts Camp in Michigan and at Berklee College of Music in Boston. After completing their five-week summer program, Rogers was given a scholarship toward his studies.

In high school, Rogers started a band with a few fellow jazz-minded friends. He began live performing around the Virgin Islands with a local pianist named Louis Taylor, an experience he says was invaluable to understanding the repertoire. “He did outline the chords of various jazz standards, play the bass-line and generally I did be able to figure it out,” he says. “That was a big, big part of my learning process, even though I didn’t realize it at the time.”

Rogers' musical education was punctuated by numerous awards, most notably a scholarship endowed by the Fish Middleton Jazz Society. He earned his Bachelor of Music in 1997 from Berklee.

He began touring professionally at the age of 17 with the Marcus Roberts trio. He has worked with Wynton Marsalis, Roy Hargrove, Joshua Redman, Tomasz Stanko, Nicholas Payton, Mulgrew Miller, Jackie McLean, Charles Lloyd and Dianne Reeves.

Rogers has toured extensively throughout the world. Over the last three decades, starting in 90ties, he’s been featured on more than 250 different recordings.

Committed to supporting the arts in the Virgin Islands, Rogers returns when his schedule permits to conduct music workshops in local schools. As well, he organize fundraising concerts that benefit the education of today's island youth peoples. His musical endeavors come full circle during performances with Ron Blake and Dion Parson in the Caribbean jazz group 21st Century.

Through the 62nd Annual GRAMMY Awards in 2019, the album “Come What May” was nominated for Best Jazz Instrumental Album. Reuben Rogers is the bassist on this album, performed by Joshua Redman’s Quartet.

== Discography ==
=== As leader ===
- The Things I Am – Reuben Rogers (Renwick Entertainment)

=== As sideman ===
With Jimmy Greene

- Gifts & Givers (Criss Cross, 2006)
- True Life Stories (Criss Cross, 2007)
- Mission Statement (Razjaz, 2009)

With Charles Lloyd

- Rabo de Nube (ECM, 2007)
- Mirror (ECM, 2010)
- Athens Concert (ECM, 2011)
- I Long to See You (Blue Note, 2016)
- Passin' Thru (Blue Note, 2016)
- 8: Kindred Spirits (Live from the Lobero) (Blue Note, 2020)

With Adonis Rose

- Song for Donise (Criss Cross, 1998)
- The Unity (Criss Cross, 1999)
- On the Verge (Criss Cross, 2007)

With Joshua Redman

- Beyond (Warner Bros.)
- Passage of Time (Warner Bros.)
- Compass (Nonesuch)
- Come What May (Nonesuch) – 2019 nominated for Best Jazz Instrumental Album at 62nd Annual Grammy Awards

With Others

- Keep the Change – Ralph Bowen (Criss Cross, 2004)
- Worlds – Aaron Goldberg (Sunnyside)
- Home – Aaron Goldberg (Sunnyside)
- Can't Wait for Perfect – Bob Reynolds (Fresh Sound)
- Testimonial – Carl Allen (Atlantic)
- Denzal Sinclaire – Denzal Sinclaire (Verve)
- A Little Moonlight – Dianne Reeves (Blue Note)
- Nouveau Swing – Donald Harrison (Impulse)
- If Less is More, Nothing is Everything – Kate McGarry (Palmetto)
- Dear Louis – Nicholas Payton (Verve)
- Sonic Tonic – Ron Blake (Mack Avenue)
- Alto Summit – Phil Woods
- What Lies Ahead – Peter Martin (Open Studio)
- December Avenue – Tomasz Stańko (ECM)
- Three of Us Are From Houston and Reuben Is Not – Walter Smith III
- Close Your Eyes – Lionel Loueke
- Corridors – Kendrick Scott (Blue Note, 2023)
