= Tárogató =

Woodwind instrument

- Modern tárogató made by Stowasser, c. 1920

Woodwind instrument
- Other names: Taragot; töröksíp; torogoata; Turkish pipe
- Classification: Wind; woodwind; aerophone
- Developed: First mentioned in the 15th century, developed from the zurna

Playing range
- Written range: B♭_{3} to C_{6} (scientific pitch notation)

Related instruments
- Zurna; shawm; clarinet; saxophone

Sound sample
- "Rákóczi March" "Rákóczi March" played on tárogató; Premier Records, Budapest, 1908

The tárogató (töröksíp, Turkish pipe; plural tárogatók or, anglicized, tárogatós; or torogoata) is a woodwind instrument commonly used in Hungarian folk music. The modern tárogató was intended to be a recreation of the original tárogató, which was historically a synonym for the toröksip (“Turkish pipe”) or zurna. However, the táragató and töroksip/zurna are today considered to be distinct instruments.

== History ==
=== Early use ===
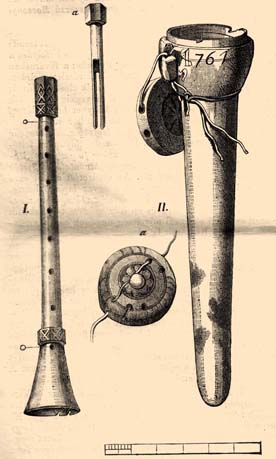
An 1859 depiction of the töröksíp (Hungarian zurna) for which tárogató was historically a synonym

Mention of the tárogató in Hungarian writings dates back to at least the 15th century. It originally referred to a variation of the zurna. The zurna was introduced to the Hungarians by the Turks during the Ottoman era, as evidenced by the synonym töröksip ("Turkish pipe"). Up to around the 18th century, the tárogató had a double reed, conical bore, and no keys.

Being a very loud and raucous instrument, the tárogató was also used as a signaling instrument in battle (like the bugle or bagpipes). However, depending on the type of reed used, it can also give off a very subtle, yet deep and mellow timbre when played at a relaxed, steady pace. Because the tárogató was representative of the Rákóczi's War of Independence (1703–1711), its use was suppressed in the 18th century by the Habsburg monarchy.

=== Modern usage ===
In the 1890s, a modern version was invented by Vencel József Schunda, a Budapest instrument maker. It uses a single reed, like a clarinet or saxophone, and has a conical bore, similar to the saxophone. It is made of wood, usually black grenadilla wood like a clarinet or oboe. The most common size, the soprano tárogató in B♭, is around 74 centimetres (29 in) in length and has a mournful sound similar to a cross between a cor anglais and a soprano saxophone. Other sizes exist: one maker, János Stowasser, advertised a family of seven sizes of which the largest was a contrabass tárogató in E♭.

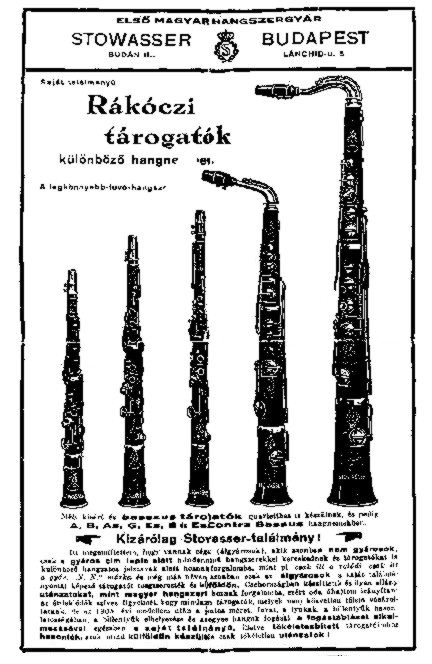
A Stowasser advertisement showing various sizes of tárogató, c. 1897–1923

The modern tárogató bears little resemblance to the historical tárogató and the two instruments should not be confused. It has been suggested that the name schundaphone would have been more accurate for the new instrument, but tárogató was used because of the nationalistic image that the original instrument had. In Hungarian, the name tárogató is now reserved for the modern tárogató, while töröksip or zurna refer to the original instrument.

The tárogató was a symbol of Hungarian aristocracy and the favorite woodwind instrument of Governor Miklós Horthy. Manufacturing of tárogatós in Hungary ceased after World War II, though they continued to be made in Romania and other countries. In the 1990s, several Hungarian makers began producing the instrument again.

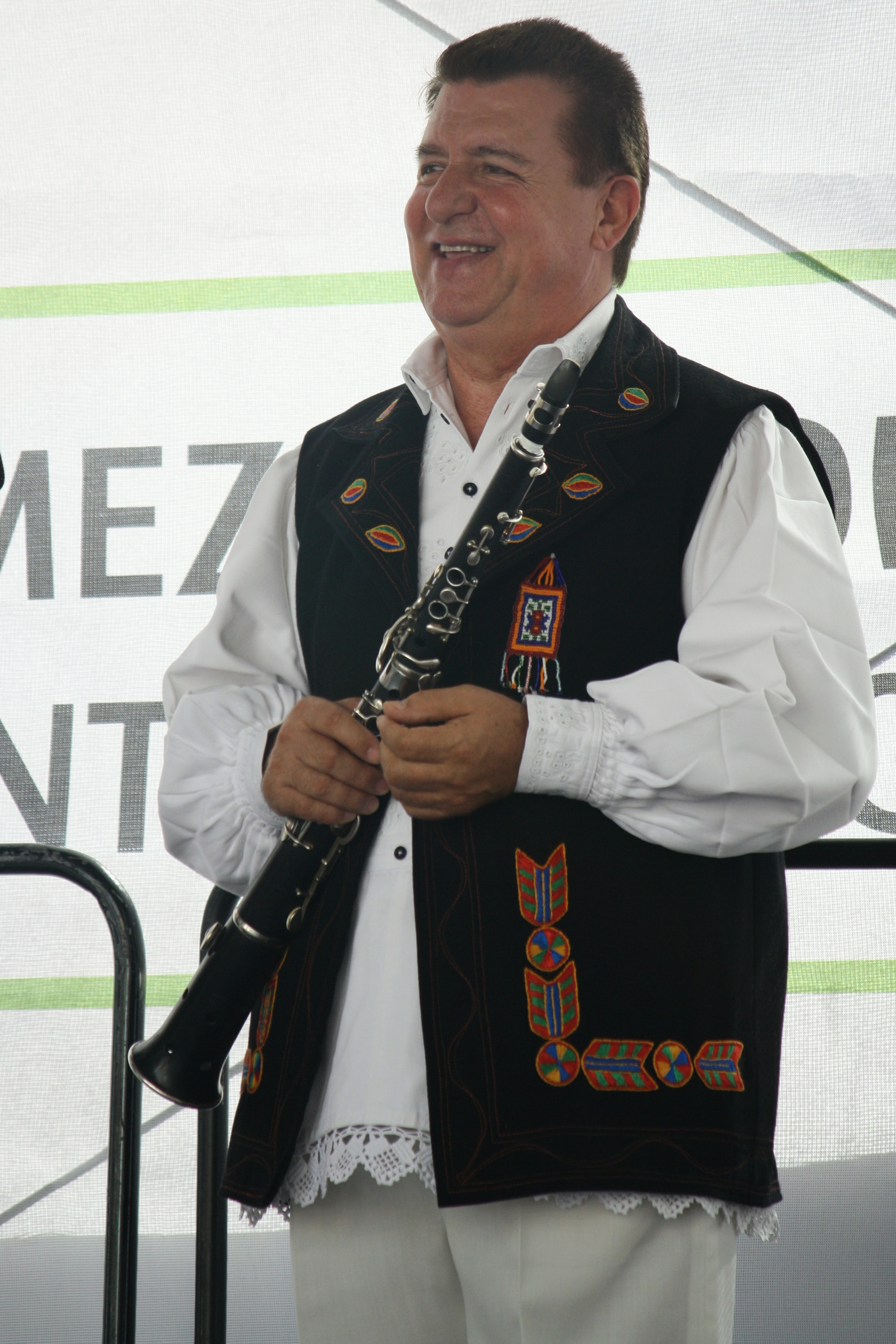
Dumitru Dobrican, a tárogató folk musician from Groși, Romania, in 2010

A modern tárogató may occasionally be heard in Act 3 of Tristan und Isolde by Richard Wagner, where it has become traditional in some opera houses (e.g. the Royal Opera House in London) to use it instead of the off-stage cor anglais for the last passage (bars 999–1149) of the Shepherd's air, but Wagner did not specify this, merely suggesting in the score "a specially built simple natural instrument".

In the 1920s, Luță Ioviță, who played the instrument in the army during World War I, brought it to Banat (Romania), where it became very popular under the name taragot. In 1928, the British music journal Melody Maker reported that the Oxford-based clarinettist Frank Dyer was using "a taragossa, a novelty Hungarian instrument which is a cross between a saxophone and a cor anglais" with his Symphonic Dance Orchestra. No such instrument as a "taragossa" exists: the rest of the journal's description fits that of the tárogató.

Dumitru Fărcaș, who was born in Maramureș, made the instrument known all over the world and was considered to be the most famous tárogató player. German saxophonist Peter Brötzmann has used the tárogató in free jazz and free improvisation. American reed players Charles Lloyd, Scott Robinson and Michael Marcus have occasionally used the tárogató. Joe Lovano has also displayed interest in the instrument, featuring it extensively in his episode of SOLOS: The Jazz Sessions, on Steve Kuhn's Mostly Coltrane, and on his own albums Trio Tapestry and Roma (both ECM Records). In 2015, Irina Ross, a Romanian singer, released her single "Taragot" which features the instrument in a dance-pop song.

== See also ==
- Music of Romania
- Music of Hungary
