= Moon Man (album) =

Studio album by Charles Lloyd
- Released: November 1970
- Recorded: July 9, 1970; Los Angeles, CA
- Genre: Jazz-funk, crossover jazz, folk rock
- Length: 41:06
- Label: Kapp (as part of MCA Records), BGO Records (CD reissue)
- Producer: Charles Lloyd

Charles Lloyd chronology
Soundtrack (1969)	Moon Man (1970)	Warm Waters (1971)

Moon Man is an album by jazz saxophonist Charles Lloyd recorded in 1970 and released on the Kapp label. It was his first album following the breakup of the Charles Lloyd Quartet and his move from Atlantic Records. This record is artistically significant because, following tremendous personal changes, Lloyd’s music developed in new directions.

== Context ==
In 1966 Lloyd founded his quartet with the young pianist Keith Jarrett, Cecil McBee (who was later replaced by Ron McClure) and Jack DeJohnette, and signed to the Atlantic label. They gained success by critics and listeners alike, toured internationally and released eight records (seven of them are live recordings). Their reputation was aided by the 1967 record Forest Flower, which sold over one million units, and made them not only the first jazz ensemble to play at The Fillmore but also the first to play in the Soviet Union. By the end of the '60s Lloyd's quartet became especially well known in the so-called "hippie movement", sharing bills with Grateful Dead, Janis Joplin, Jimi Hendrix, The Byrds or Jefferson Airplane. He struggled with health problems, the death of his mother, drug abuse, and depression.

In the documentary Arrows into Infinity (2014, ECM Records) Lloyd explains: "At a certain point I began to suffer musically and I began to suffer personally and I was off my spiritual campus and I could feel it and it disturbed me and I had to go away. […] I hit a wall and I couldn't really function in the music business, [it] was very disenchanting to me at that time." So in 1969 he disbanded the quartet and moved from New York to California, where he went to college – away from the temporary jazz scene to a jazz outback. At the age of 31 Lloyd decided to turn his back to the public and enter a detoxification center in Malibu. But he never stopped playing and continued to record. Matt Leskovic of All About Jazz sees retrospectively that "[d]rugs, depression, frustration with the recording industry, and increased interest in his developing spirituality inspired periods of reclusion."

== Music and production ==
Due to his disappearance Lloyd's fans lost track of him in the 1970s, as "he was channeling the majority of his musical energy outside of the normal jazz realm." In the liner notes of the reissue Tom Callaghan writes: "Like that other great recluse of the time, Miles Davis, Lloyd embarked on a long and solitary journey, but one of spiritual discovery and enlightenment. […] Occasional recordings would emerge, but concerts performances were few and far between." Moon Man marks his first studio recording since the 1966 Dream Weaver. In the meantime Lloyd change to Kapp Records, recruited former members of the sextet 'Listen' in San Francisco and added for the first time lyrics to his compositions. Besides tenor saxophone and flute he now can also be heard for the first time on vocals and theremin. While musically his style developed more psychedelic and folk rock elements, his interest in spirituality like Transcendental Meditation and Islam influenced some of the lyrical topics.

It was additionally the first production led by Lloyd, while Eric Sherman (who assisted the recordings of Waves in 1972) did the design concept. The LP cover shows an adaptation of the 1968 photograph Earthrise with a retouched silhouette of Lloyd playing flute on the moon. The record opens with the corresponding "Moonman I" and ends with "Moonman II" – though they are not written as two words.

From there on Lloyd worked as a session player and recorded as guest musician for The Beach Boys (many of them participated on the follow-up Warm Waters in 1971), Canned Heat, The Doors and Roger McGuinn (like Lloyd a friend of Bob Dylan).

== Reception and release ==
Professional ratings
Review scores
Source	Rating
Allmusic	2/5 stars
The Penguin Guide to Jazz Recordings	2/4 stars

At that time Lloyd's "music was warm, inviting, and peaceful, unlike the abrasive, aggressive protest statements made by many of his 1960s contemporaries. It provided a sonic backdrop and soothing soundtrack for a generation of alienated youth." Many of the temporary circumstances influenced Lloyd and his new project. "Moon Man was a recording born out of this period, a time of great uncertainty and darkness in the heart of America, when the hitherto unassailable ramparts of US capitalism and lifestyle had been shaken by the radical questioning of the Summer of Love and the horrors of the Vietnam War," as Tom Callaghan explains in the liner notes.

An album review in Billboard of September 12, 1970, categorized it as "Pop" saying "Lloyd has switched into the rock energy and came up with a rock album that contains his own music and lyrics. Good etherial product, part jazz, a lot of rock and much heavy." Generally the album receives still mixed reviews and has mostly been overlooked in Lloyd's catalogue. The Allmusic review awarded the album with only 2 stars. Josef Woodard of JazzTimes Magazine has even called it "quirky".

At the end of 1970 the recording was simultaneously released in the US, Canada, the UK, France and Italy; but the demand wasn't big enough to reprint it. As of 2016 there has only been one reissue so far: BGO Records rereleased it once on compact disc in 1997.

== Legacy ==
The track "I Don't Care What You Tell Me" has been recorded by boogie band Canned Heat in 1971 on their Historical Figures and Ancient Heads with Lloyd on flute.

== Track listing ==
All compositions and lyrics by Charles Lloyd except as indicated

1. "Moonman I" – 3:33
2. "I Don't Care What You Tell Me" – 2:58
3. "Sermon" (additional lyrics by Bob Jenkins) – 1:07
4. "Sweet Juvenia" – 6:12
5. "Heavy Karma" (James Zitro) – 9:32
6. "Hejira: Prayer/Exile/Journey/Hurrikit/Forever" – 6:58
7. "Ship" – 2:26
8. "Moonman II" – 8:20
9. "CrankDat" – 4:20

== Personnel ==
=== Music ===
- Charles Lloyd – tenor saxophone, flute, vocals, theremin
- Michael Cohen – keyboards
- Kenneth "Ken" Jenkins – bass
- James Zitro – drums
- Ned Doheny – vocals, guitar
- Bob Jenkins – vocals

=== Production ===
- Charles Lloyd – producer
- Henry Lewy – engineer
- Eric Sherman – design concept
- John C. LePrevost – art direction
