= Geeta (album) =

1973 album by Charles Lloyd

Studio album by Charles Lloyd
- Released: 1973
- Recorded: 1973
- Studio: Malibu Road and A&M Studios
- Genre: Jazz
- Length: 39:47
- Label: A&M
- Producer: Charles Lloyd

Charles Lloyd chronology
| Waves (1972) | Geeta (1973) | Weavings (1978) |

Professional ratings
Review scores
| Source | Rating |
|---|---|
| AllMusic | 3/5 stars |

Geeta is the fifteenth studio album by jazz saxophonist and flutist Charles Lloyd. It was released by A&M Records as album SP 3046.

== Reception ==
Billboard's 1973 review commented that "The fading Indian musical influence blending cogently with free flowing modern jazz is the end result here", and suggested that the second side was the more commercial.

== Track listing ==
All compositions by Charles Lloyd except as indicated

- Side A
1. "Geeta Suite" – 13:30
  1. "Arjuna (Tender Warrior)"
  2. "Song of Brindavan"
2. "Dance of the Gopis" – 6:25
- Side B
1. "Stones Medley" (Mick Jagger, Keith Richards) – 11:08
  1. "Backstreet Girl"
  2. "Lady Jane"
  3. "Mother's Little Helper"
2. "Maxfield" – 4:30
3. "Jungle Blues" – 2:12
4. "Berries" – 2:02

== Personnel ==
- Charles Lloyd – flute, tenor saxophone
- DeWayne "Blackbird" McKnight – guitar
- Baba Alade – bass
- Aashish Khan, Planish Khan – dholak

== Production ==
- Art direction – Roland Young
- Cover art – Masami Teraoka
- Album design – Chuck Beeson
