= Tsukioka Yoshitoshi =

Japanese artist and printmaker (1839–1892)

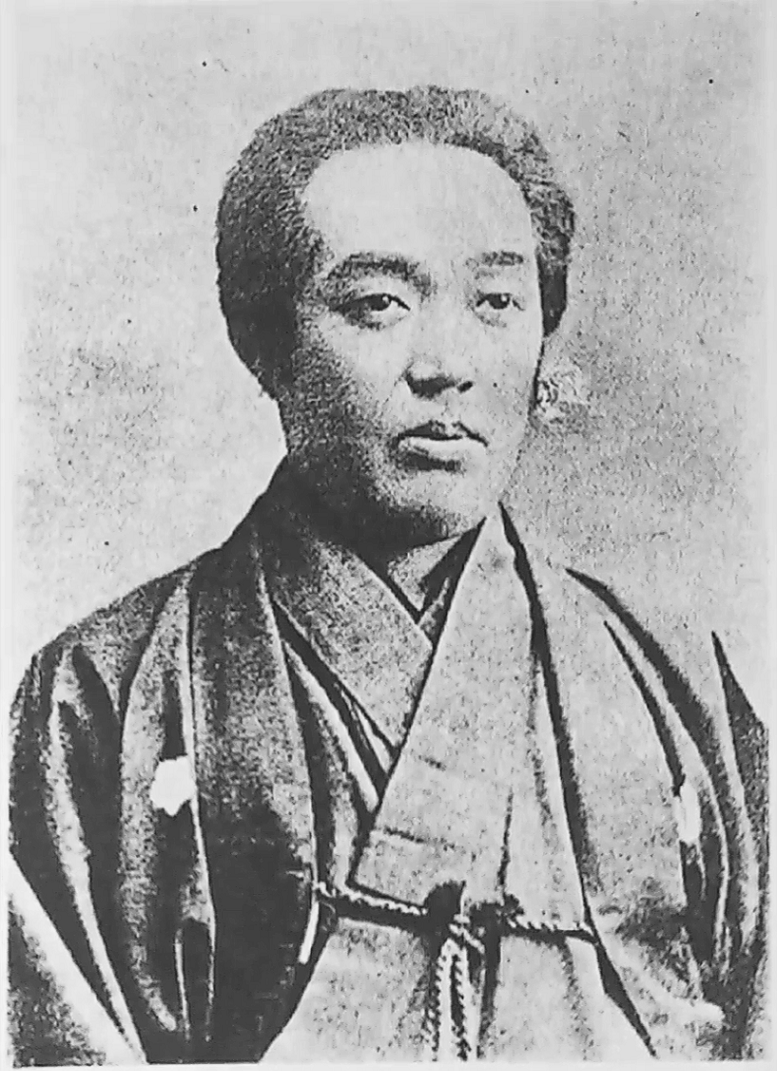
- Tsukioka c. 1882
- Born: April 30, 1839; Edo, Japan
- Died: June 9, 1892 (aged 53); Ryōgoku, Tokyo, Japan
- Known for: Ukiyo-e
- Spouse: Sakamaki Taiko (m. 1884)
- Children: 2

Tsukioka Yoshitoshi (Japanese: 月岡芳年; also named Taiso Yoshitoshi 大蘇芳年; 30 April 1839 – 9 June 1892) was a Japanese printmaker.

Yoshitoshi has widely been recognized as the last great master of the ukiyo-e genre of woodblock printing and painting. He is also regarded as one of the form's greatest innovators. His career spanned two eras – the last years of Edo period Japan, and the first years of modern Japan following the Meiji Restoration. Like many Japanese, Yoshitoshi was interested in new things from the rest of the world, but over time he became increasingly concerned with the loss of many aspects of traditional Japanese culture, among them traditional woodblock printing.

By the end of his career, Yoshitoshi was in an almost single-handed struggle against time and technology. As he worked on in the old manner, Japan was adopting European mass reproduction methods like photography and lithography. Nonetheless, in a Japan that was turning away from its own past, he almost singlehandedly managed to push the traditional Japanese woodblock print to a new level, before it effectively died with him.

His life was summed up by John Stevenson:

Yoshitoshi's courage, vision and force of character gave ukiyo-e another generation of life, and illuminated it with one last burst of glory.

— John Stevenson, Yoshitoshi's One Hundred Aspects of the Moon, 1992

== Biography: The early years ==
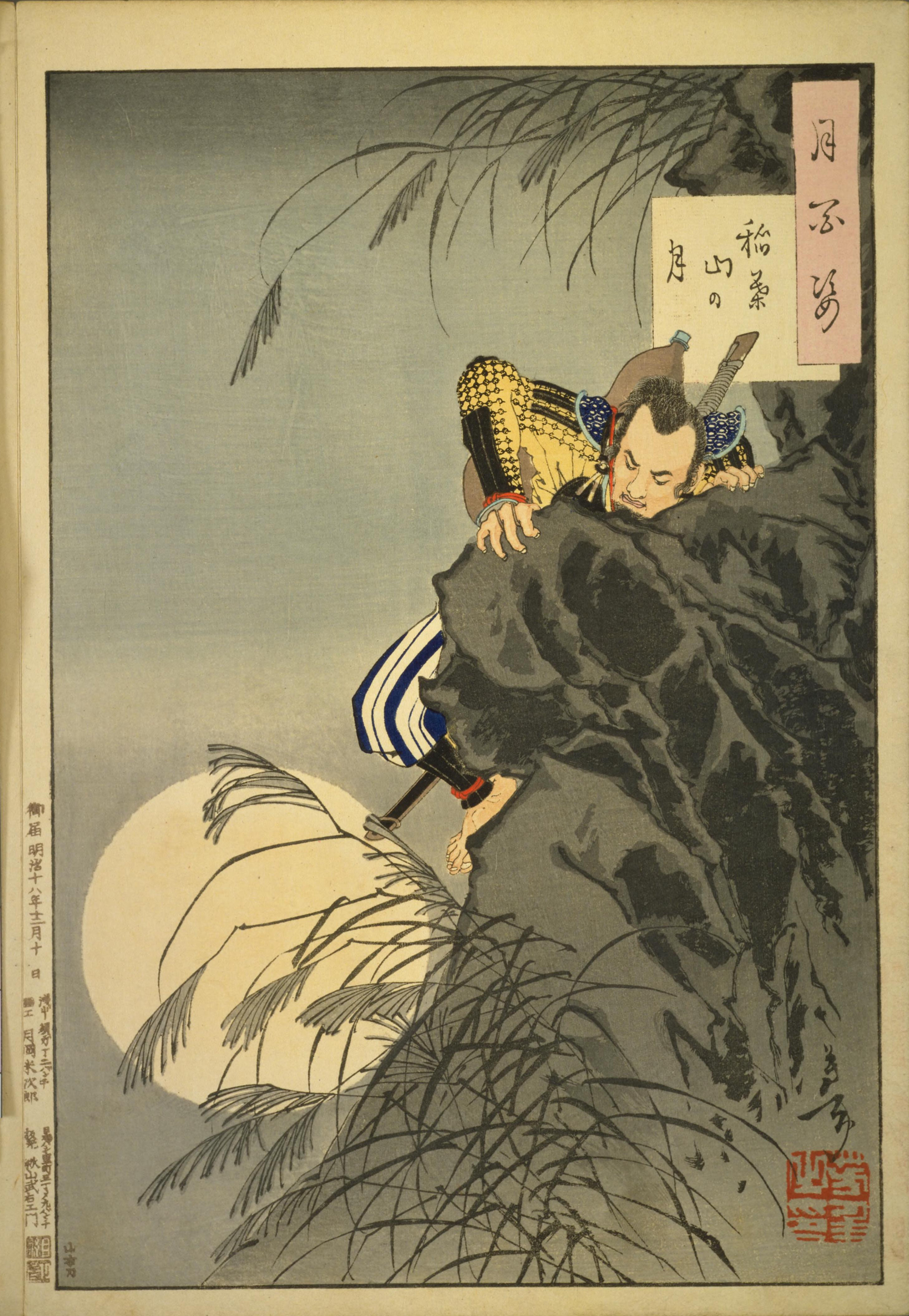
100 Aspects of the Moon No. 7, "Inaba Mountain Moon". The young Toyotomi Hideyoshi leads a small group assaulting the castle on Inaba Mountain (1885).

Yoshitoshi was born in the Shimbashi district of old Edo, in 1839. His original name was Owariya Yonejiro. His father was a wealthy merchant who had bought his way into samurai status. At the age of three years, Yoshitoshi left home to live with his uncle, a pharmacist with no son, who was very fond of his nephew. At the age of five, he became interested in art and started to take lessons from his uncle. In 1850, when he was 11 years old, Yoshitoshi was apprenticed to Kuniyoshi, one of the great masters of the Japanese woodblock print. Kuniyoshi gave his apprentice the new artist's name "Yoshitoshi", denoting lineage in the Utagawa School. Although he was not seen as Kuniyoshi's successor during his lifetime, he is now recognized as the most important pupil of Kuniyoshi.

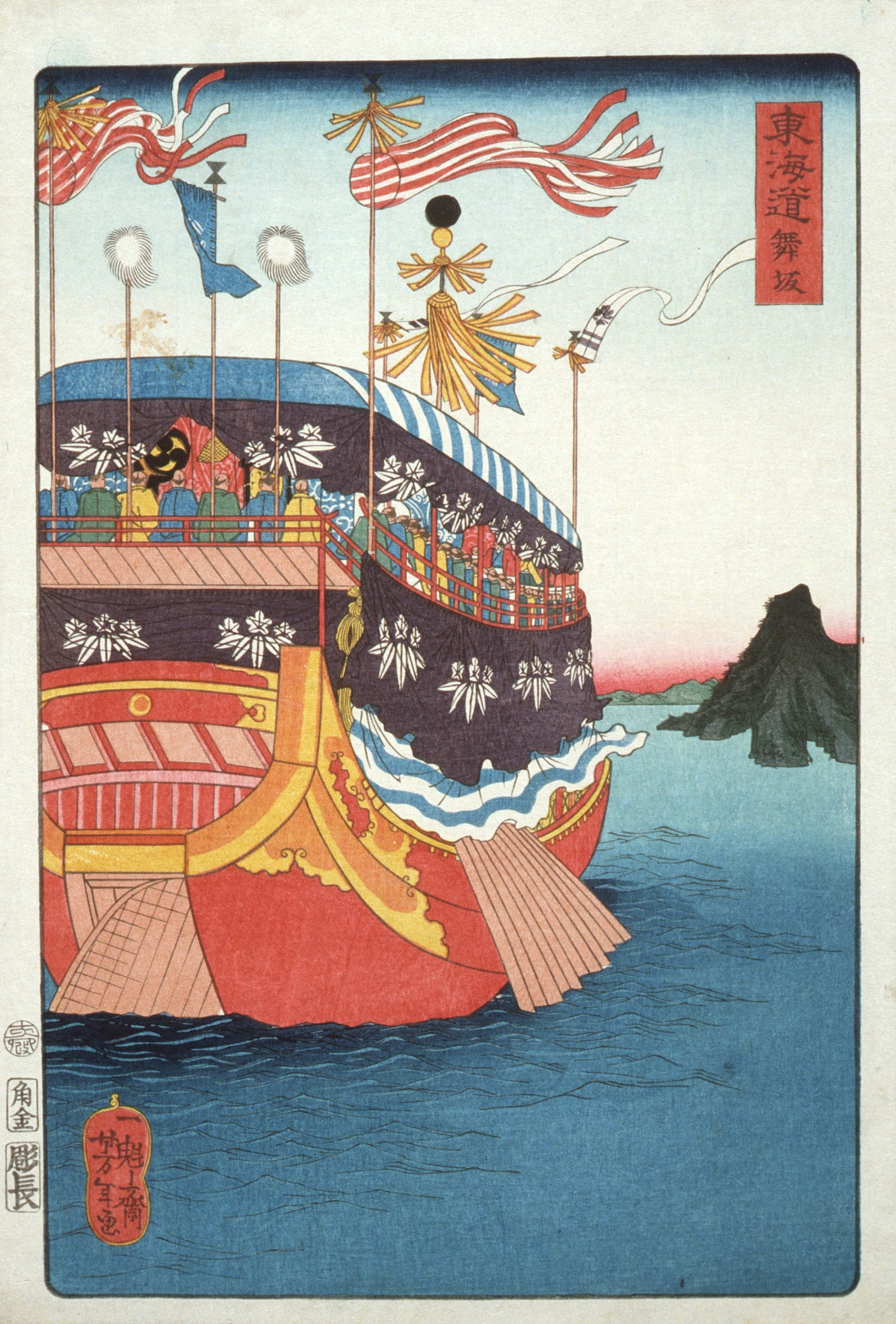
Tokaido Meisho no Uchi, "Maisaka", early Yoshitoshi seascape design from a collaborative series (1863)

During his training, Yoshitoshi concentrated on refining his draftsmanship skills and copying his mentor's sketches. Kuniyoshi emphasized drawing from real life, which was unusual in Japanese training because the artist's goal was to communicate the essence of the subject matter rather than to furnish a literal representation of it. Yoshitoshi also learned the elements of western drawing techniques and perspective through studying Kuniyoshi's collection of foreign prints and engravings.

Yoshitoshi's first print appeared in 1853, but nothing else appeared for many years, perhaps as a result of the illness of his master Kuniyoshi during his last years. This first print, an ōban triptych titled Bunji gannen Heike no ichimon horobi kaichū ochiiru zu and depicting the defeat of the Taira clan by the Minamoto at the Battle of Dan-no-ura, was signed "Ikkaisai Yoshitoshi". Because debut prints were typically much smaller in format, some scholars, including Segi Shin'ichi, have argued that this triptych was in fact created to mark Yoshitoshi's coming of age rather than being his true artistic debut, which they place instead in 1859. Although his life was hard after Kuniyoshi's death in 1861, he did manage to produce some work, 44 prints of his being known from 1862. In the next two years he had sixty-three of his designs, mostly kabuki prints, published. He also contributed designs to the 1863 Tokaido series by Utagawa School artists organized under the auspices of Kunisada.

== The "Bloody Prints": capturing the public imagination ==
Many of Yoshitoshi's prints of the 1860s are depictions of graphic violence and death. These themes were partly inspired by the death of Yoshitoshi's father in 1863 and by the lawlessness and violence of the Japan surrounding him, which was simultaneously experiencing the breakdown of the feudal system imposed by the Tokugawa shogunate, as well as the effect of contact with Westerners. In late 1863, Yoshitoshi began making violent sketches, eventually incorporated into battle prints designed in a bloody and extravagant style. The public enjoyed these prints and Yoshitoshi began to move up in the ranks of ukiyo-e artists in Edo. With the country at war, Yoshitoshi's images allowed those who were not directly involved in the fighting to experience it vicariously through his designs. The public was attracted to Yoshitoshi's work not only for his superior composition and draftsmanship, but also his passion and intense involvement with his subject matter. Besides the demands of woodblock print publishers and consumers, Yoshitoshi was also trying to exorcise the demons of horror that he and his fellow countrymen were experiencing.

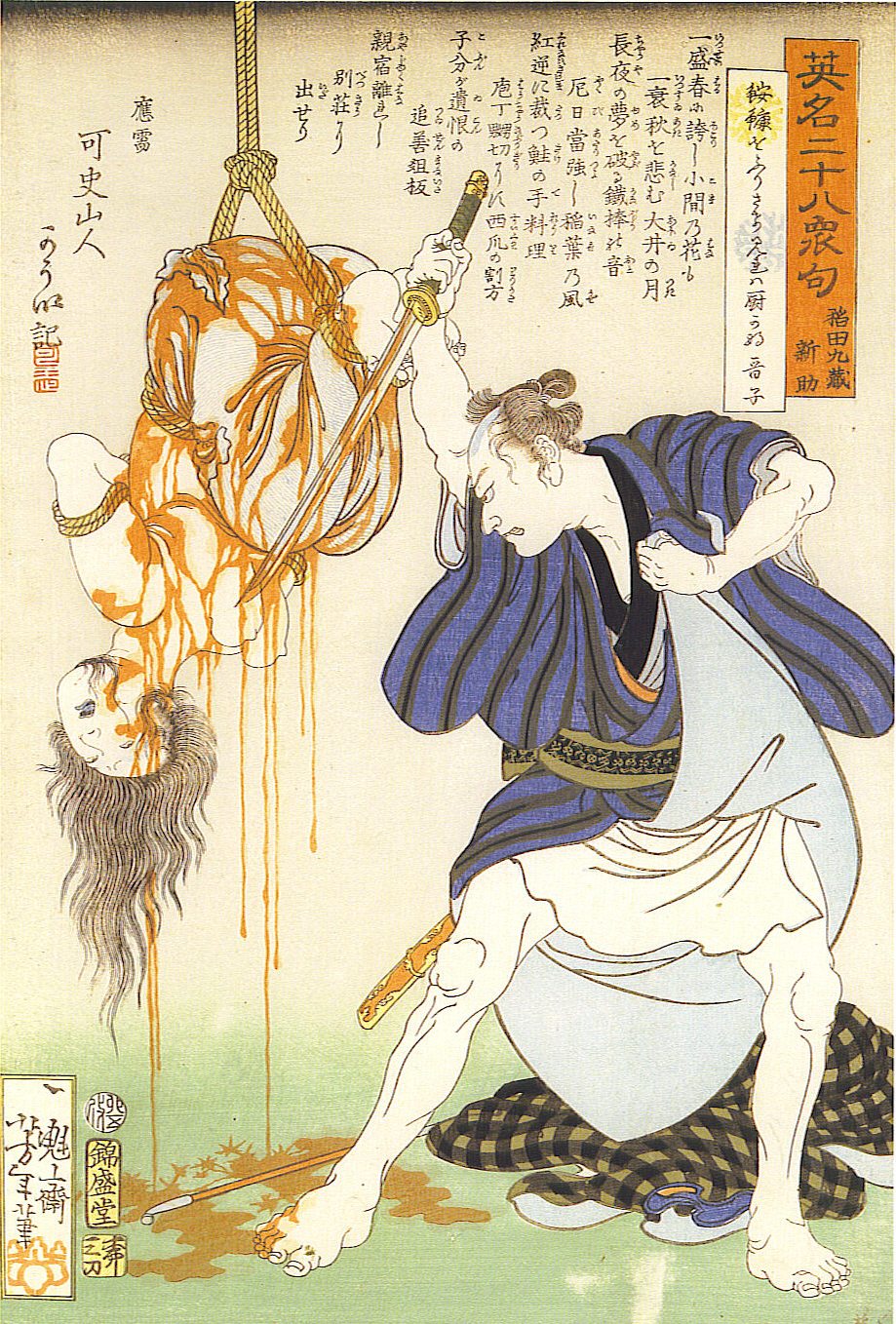
Eimei nijūhasshūku (Twenty-eight famous murders with verse, 1867)

As he gained notoriety, Yoshitoshi was able to have ninety-five more of his designs published in 1865, mostly on military and historical subjects. Among these, two series would reveal Yoshitoshi's creativity, originality, and imagination. The first series, Tsūzoku saiyūki ("A Modern Journey to the West"), is about a Chinese folk-hero. The second, Wakan hyaku monogatari ("One Hundred Stories of China and Japan"), illustrates traditional ghost stories.

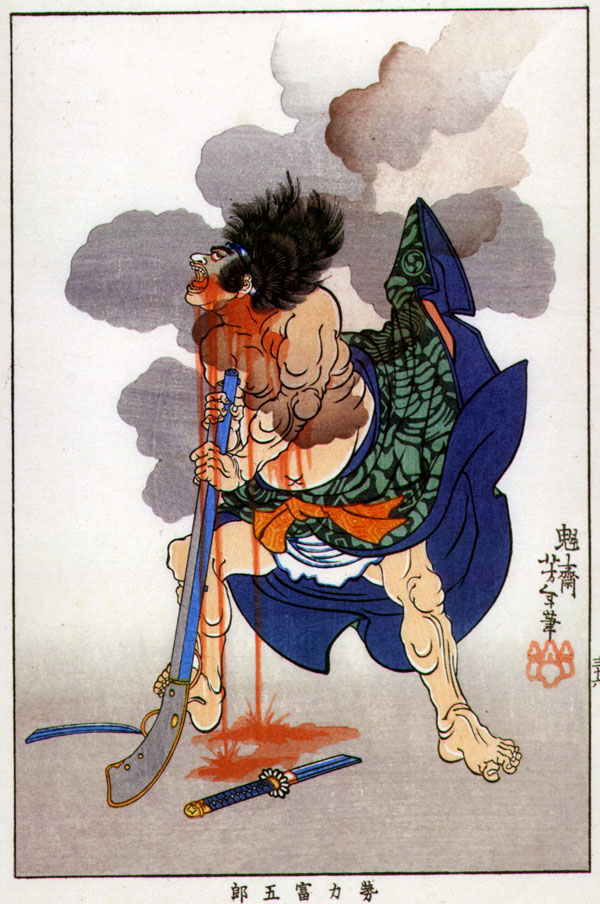
"Seiriki Tamigorō committing suicide" from Kinsei kyōgiden series (1865)

Between 1866 and 1868 Yoshitoshi created disturbing images, notably in the series Eimei nijūhasshūku ("Twenty-eight famous murders with verse"). These prints show killings in very graphic detail, such as decapitations of women with bloody handprints on their robes. Other examples can be found in the strange figures of the 1866 series Kinsei kyōgiden, ("Biographies of Modern Men"), which depicted the power struggle between two gambling rings, and the 1867 series Azuma no nishiki ukiyo kōdan. In 1868, following the Battle of Ueno, Yoshitoshi made the series Kaidai hyaku sensō in which he portrays contemporary soldiers as historical figures in a semi-western style, using close-up and unusual angles, often shown in the heat of battle with desperate expressions.

It is said that Yoshitoshi's work of the "bloody" period has influenced writers such as Jun'ichirō Tanizaki (1886–1965) as well as artists including Tadanori Yokoo and Masami Teraoka. Although Yoshitoshi made a name for himself in this manner, the "bloody" prints represent only a small portion of his work.

== The middle years: hard times and resurrection ==
From Yoshitoshi's series of beautiful women Shinryu nijushi toki (1880)

By 1869, Yoshitoshi was regarded as one of the best woodblock artists in Japan. However, shortly thereafter, he ceased to receive commissions, perhaps because the public were tired of scenes of violence. By 1871, Yoshitoshi became severely depressed, and his personal life became one of great turmoil, which was to continue sporadically until his death. He lived in appalling conditions with his devoted mistress, Okoto, who sold off her clothes and possessions to support him. At one point they were reduced to burning the floor-boards from the house for warmth. It is said that in 1872 he suffered a complete mental breakdown after being shocked by the lack of popularity of his recent designs.

In the following year his fortunes turned, when his mood improved, and he started to produce more prints. Prior to 1873, he had signed most of his prints as "Ikkaisai Yoshitoshi". However, as a form of self-affirmation, he at this time changed his artist name to "Taiso" (meaning "great resurrection"). Newspapers sprung up in the modernization drive, and Yoshitoshi was recruited to produce "news nishikie". These were woodblock prints designed as full-page illustrations to accompany articles, usually on lurid and sensationalized subjects such as "true crime" stories. Yoshitoshi's financial condition was still precarious, however, and in 1876, his mistress Okoto, in a gesture of devotion, sold herself to a brothel to help him.

With the Satsuma Rebellion of 1877, in which the old feudal order made one last attempt to stop the new Japan, newspaper circulation soared, and woodblock artists were in demand, with Yoshitoshi earning much attention. In late 1877, he took up with a new mistress, the geisha Oraku; like Okoto, she sold her clothes and possessions to support him, and when they separated after a year, she too hired herself out to a brothel. Yoshitoshi's works gave him more public recognition, and the money was a help, but it was not until 1882 that he was secure.

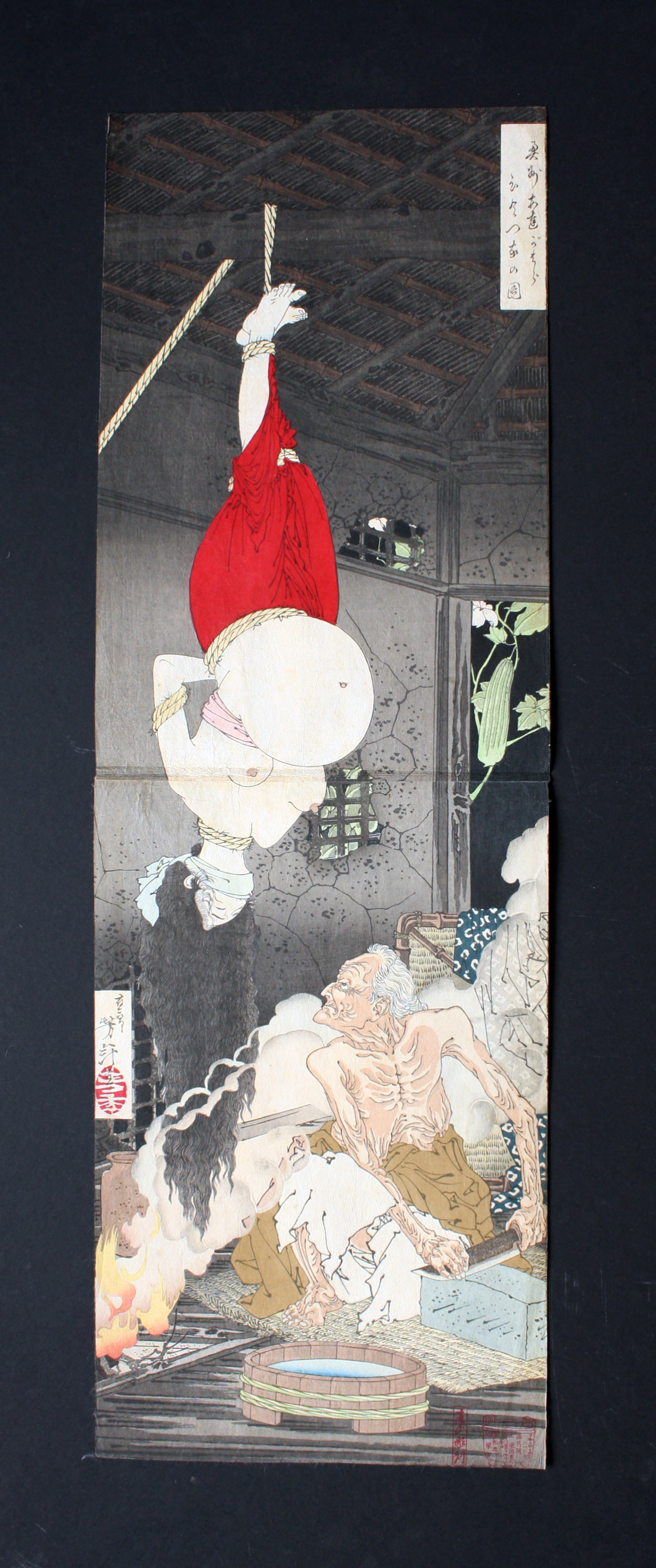
The Lonely House on Adachi Moor (1885)

A series of bijin-ga designed in 1878 entitled Bijin shichi yoka caused political trouble for Yoshitoshi because it depicted seven female attendants to the Imperial court and identified them by name. It may be that the Empress Meiji herself was displeased with this fact and with the style of her portrait in the series.

Yoshitoshi published "Mirror of Famous Generals of Great Japan", a series of 51 works that depicted great men from Japanese mythology to the Edo period, from 1877 to 1882, and he further increased his reputation.

In 1880, he met another woman, a former geisha with two children, Sakamaki Taiko. They were married in 1884, and while he continued to philander, her gentle and patient temperament seems to have helped stabilize his behavior. One of Taiko's children, adopted as a son, became Yoshitoshi's student, and was thence known as Tsukioka Kōgyo.

In 1883, Yoshitoshi published "Fujiwara no Yasumasa Gekka Roteki zu" (Fujiwara no Yasumasa Playing the Flute) an ukiyo-e, based on an original drawing which was exhibited at the previous year's exhibition of Japanese paintings. This work is based on setsuwa stories written in "Konjaku Monogatarishū" and "Uji Shūi Monogatari", which were compiled between the 12th and 13th centuries, and depicts a bandit, Hakamadare, trying to attack Fujiwara no Yasumasa, who is playing the flute, but being unable to move because of Yasumasa's silent pressure. This work is regarded as one of Yoshitoshi's best.

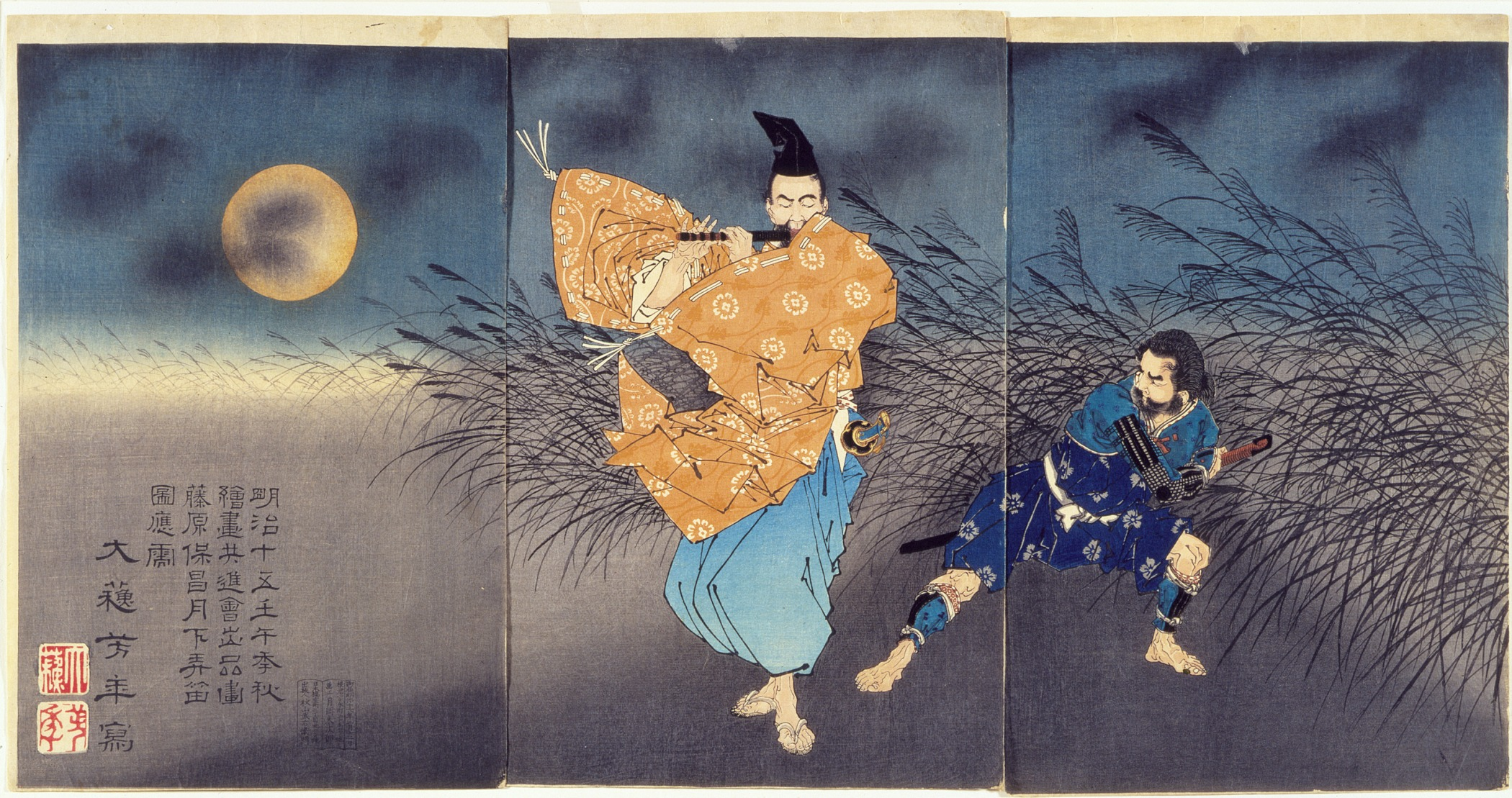
"Fujiwara no Yasumasa Gekka Roteki zu" (Fujiwara no Yasumasa Playing the Flute) (1883)

Yoshitoshi's notorious, yet compelling, "Oshu adachigahara hitotsuya no zu" (The Lonely House on Adachi Moor) appeared in 1885. This work depicts the legend of kijo in Kurozuka written in "Shūi Wakashū", which was compiled in the 11th century, and Kurozuka is also performed in noh, kabuki and jōruri. This macabre work is iconic in its own right and influential in the history of modern kinbaku, in that Itoh Seiu was fascinated by Yoshitoshi's accurate depiction of sakasa zuri (upside down suspension).

An 1885 issue of the art and fashion magazine "Tokyo Hayari Hosomiki" ranked Yoshitoshi as the number-one ukiyo-e artist, ahead of his Meiji contemporaries such as Utagawa Yoshiiku and Toyohara Kunichika. Thus he had achieved great popularity and critical acclaim.

By this point, the woodblock industry was in severe straits. All the great woodblock artists of the early part of the century—Hiroshige, Kunisada, and Kuniyoshi—had died decades earlier, and the woodblock print as an art form was dying in the confusion of modernizing Japan.

Yoshitoshi insisted on high standards of production and helped save it temporarily from degeneracy. He became a master teacher and had notable pupils such as Toshikata Mizuno, Toshihide Migita, and others.

== Later years: the eclipse of ukiyo-e ==
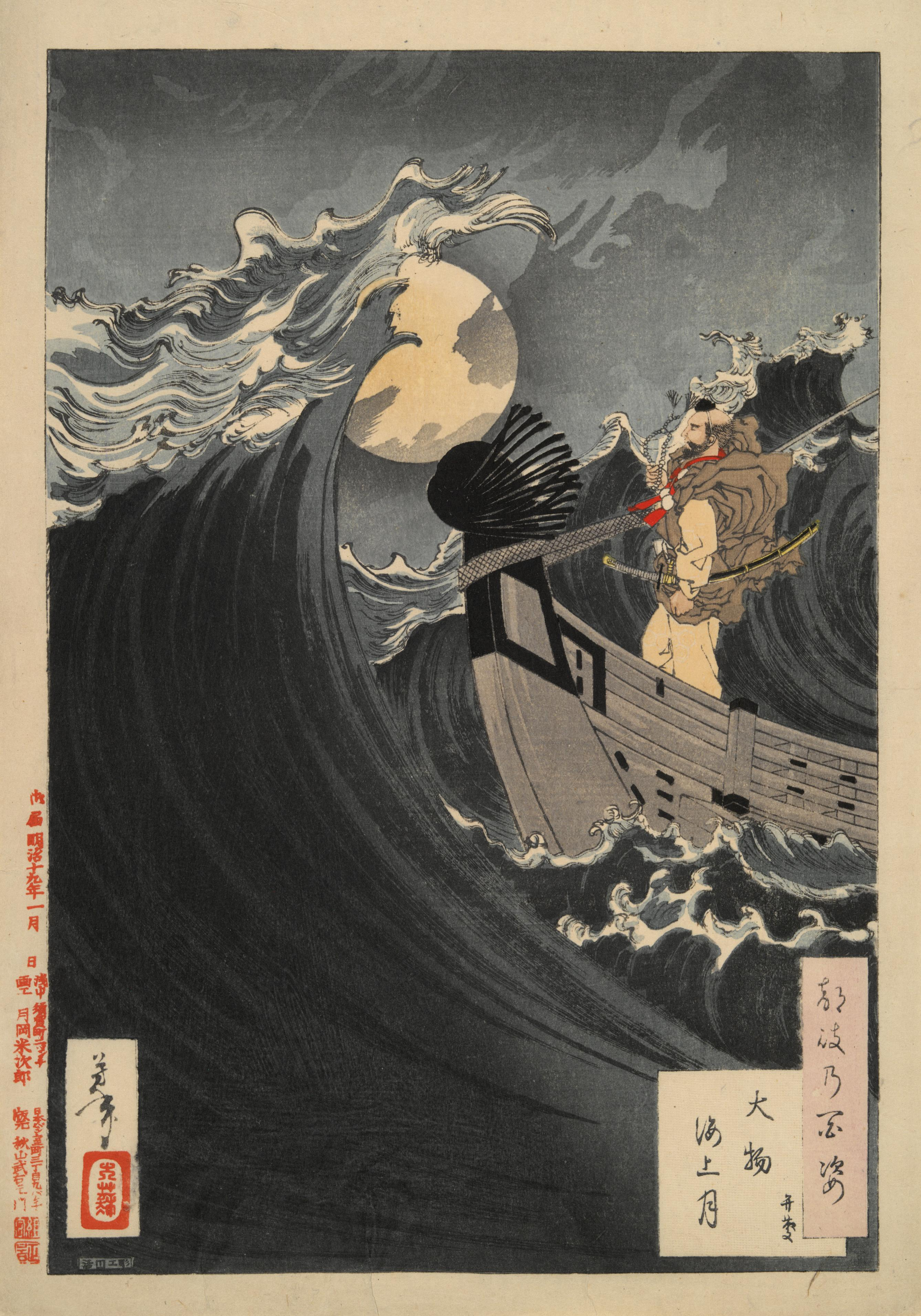
From Yoshitoshi's Tsuki hyakushi ("One hundred aspects of the moon")

His last years were among his most productive, with his great series One Hundred Aspects of the Moon (1885–1892), and New Forms of Thirty-Six Ghosts (1889–1892), as well as some masterful triptychs of kabuki theatre actors and scenes.

During this period he also cooperated with his friend, the actor Ichikawa Danjūrō, and others, in an attempt to preserve some of the traditional Japanese arts.

In his last years, his mental problems started to recur. In early 1891 he invited friends to a gathering of artists that did not actually exist, but rather turned out to be a delusion. His physical condition also deteriorated, and his misfortune was compounded when all of his money was stolen in a robbery of his home. After more symptoms, he was admitted to a mental hospital. He eventually left, in May 1892, but did not return home, instead renting rooms.

He died three weeks later in a rented room, on June 9, 1892, from a cerebral hemorrhage. He was 53 years old. A stone memorial monument to Yoshitoshi was built in Mukojima Hyakkaen garden, Tokyo, in 1898.

holding back the night
with its increasing brilliance
the summer moon

— Yoshitoshi's death poem

== Retrospective observations ==
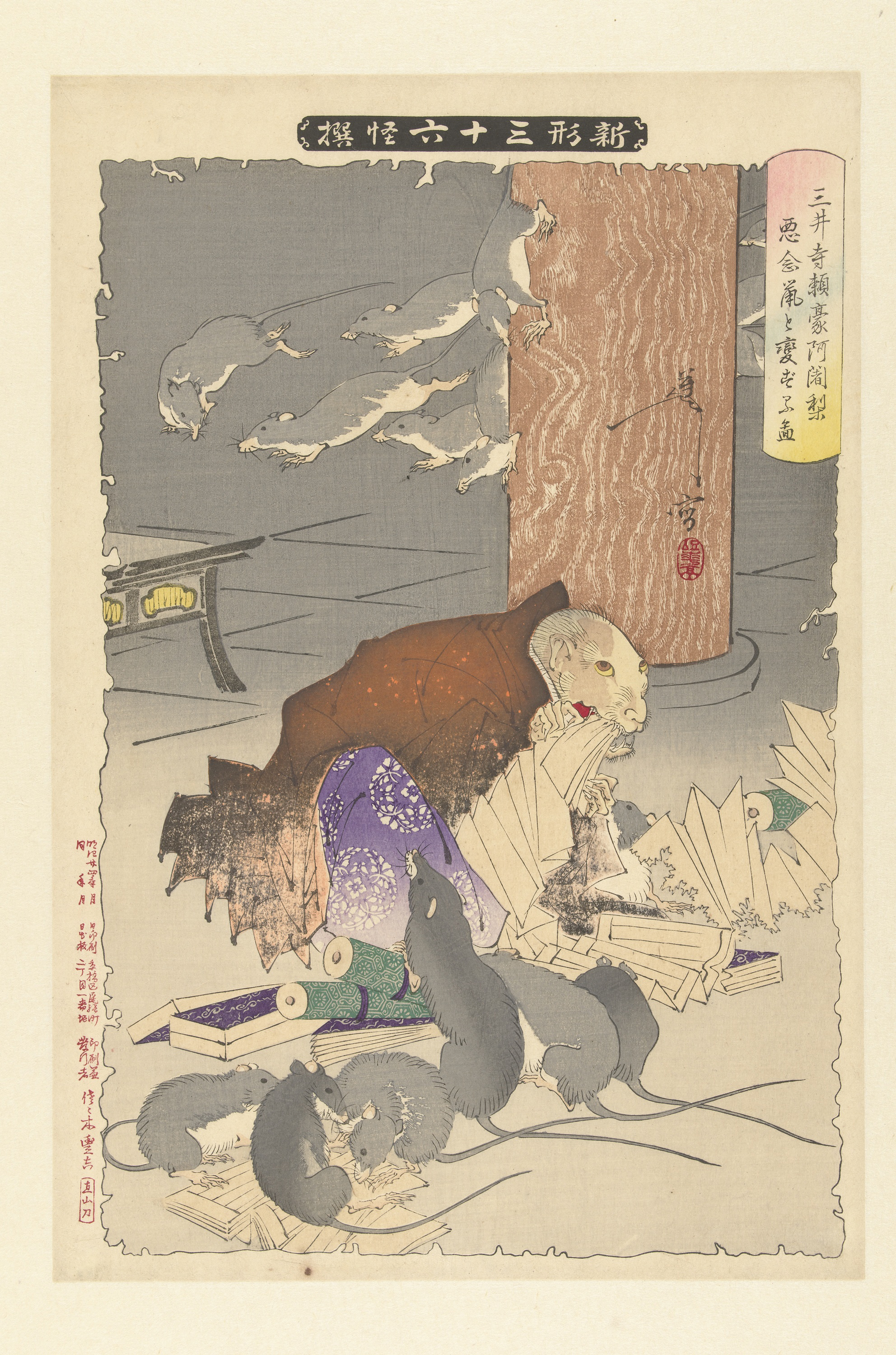
Design from Yoshitoshi's series Shinkei Sanjurokuten (36 Ghosts), "Priest Raigo of Mii Temple" (1891)

During his life he produced many series of prints, and a large number of triptychs, many of great merit. Two of his three best-known series, the One Hundred Aspects of the Moon and Thirty-Six Ghosts, contain numerous masterpieces. The third, Thirty-Two Aspects of Customs and Manners, was for many years the most highly regarded of his work, but does not now have that same status. Other less-common series also contain many fine prints, including Famous Generals of Japan, A Collection of Desires, New Selection of Eastern Brocade Pictures, and Lives of Modern People.

While demand for his prints continued for a few years, eventually interest in him waned, both in Japan, and around the world. The canonical view in this period was that the generation of Hiroshige was really the last of the great woodblock artists, and more traditional collectors stopped even earlier, at the generation of Utamaro and Toyokuni.

However, starting in the 1970s, interest in him resumed, and reappraisal of his work has shown the quality, originality and genius of the best of it, and the degree to which he succeeded in keeping the best of the old Japanese woodblock print, while pushing the field forward by incorporating both new ideas from the West, as well as his own innovations.

== Print series ==
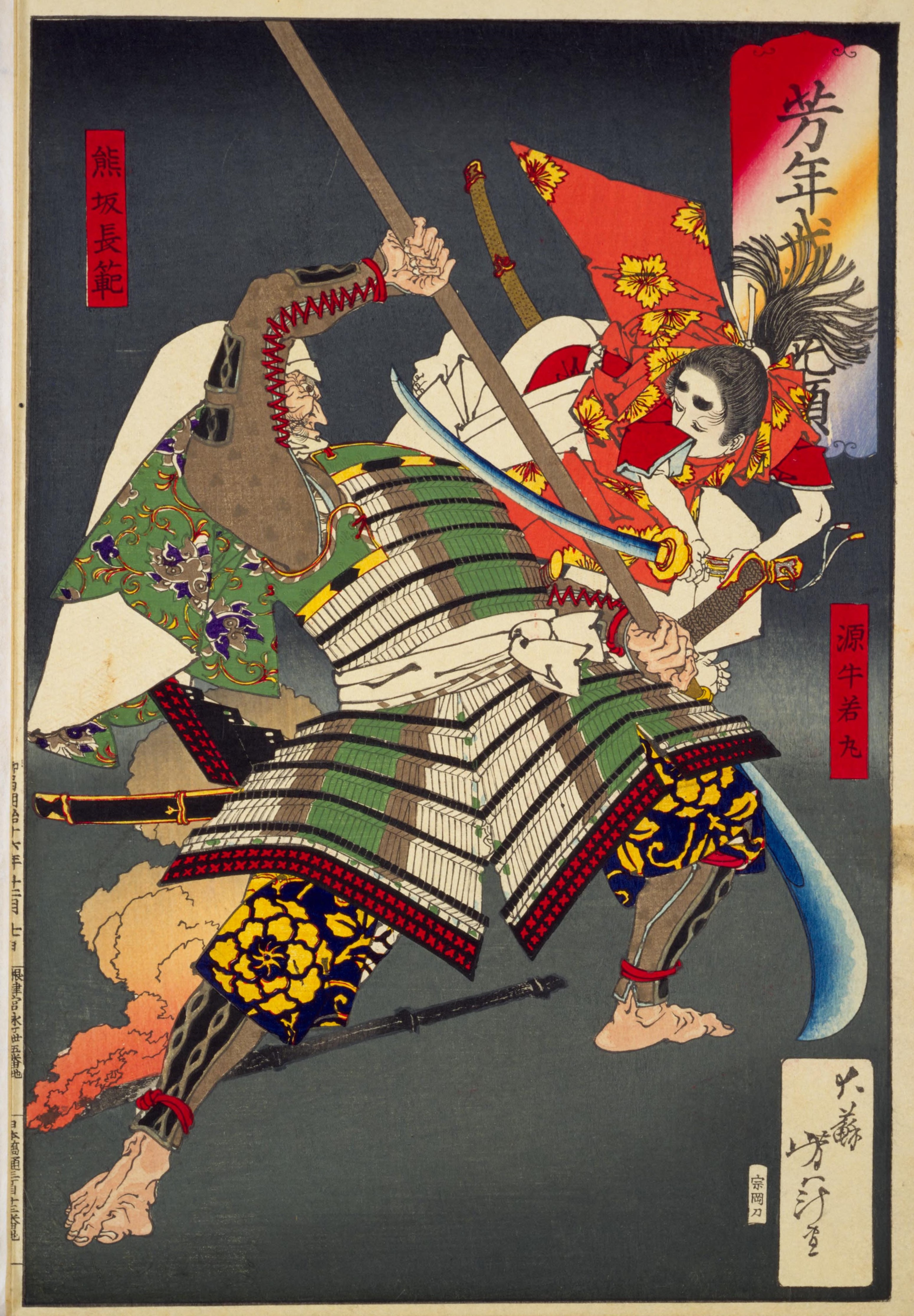
Warriors Trembling with Courage: The fight between Ushiwakamaru (Minamoto no Yoshitsune) and the bandit chief Kumasaka Chohan in 1174.

- One Hundred Stories of Japan and China (1865–1866)
- Biographies of Modern Men (1865–1866)
- Twenty-Eight Famous Murders with Verses (1866–1869)
- One Hundred Warriors (1868–1869)
- Biographies of Drunken Valiant Tigers (1874)
- Mirror of Beauties Past and Present (1876)
- Mirror of Famous Generals of Great Japan (1876–1882)
- A Collection of Desires (1877)
- Eight Elements of Honor (1878)
- Twenty-Four Hours with the Courtesans of Shimbashi and Yanagibashi (1880)
- Warriors Trembling with Courage (1883–1886)
- Yoshitoshi Manga (1885–1887)
- One Hundred Aspects of the Moon (1885–1892)
- Personalities of Recent Times (1886–1888)
- Thirty-Two Aspects of Customs and Manners (1888) "Fuzoku sanjuniso – Aitasou"
- New Forms of Thirty-Six Ghosts (1889–1892)

== One Hundred Aspects of the Moon ==
Yoshitoshi's series One Hundred Aspects of the Moon consists of one hundred woodblocks, published in his later years, between 1885 -1892. Although some prints do not depict the moon, it is a unifying motif for the whole series.

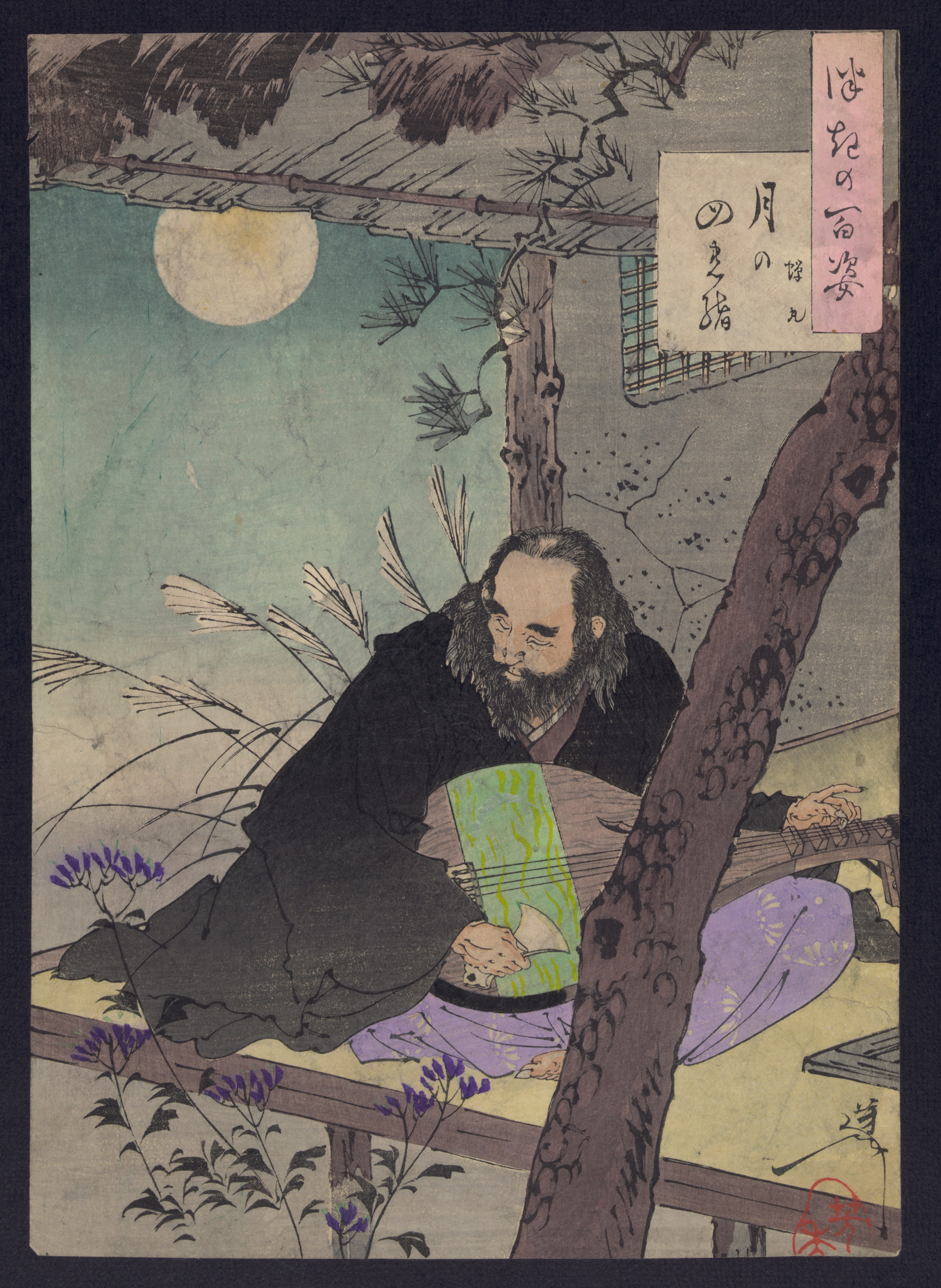

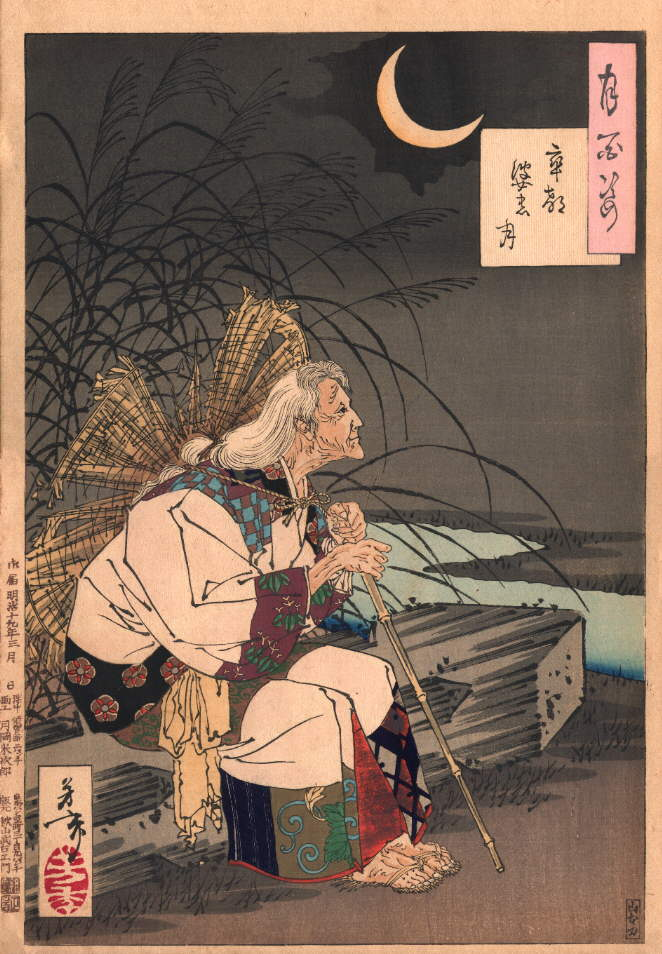

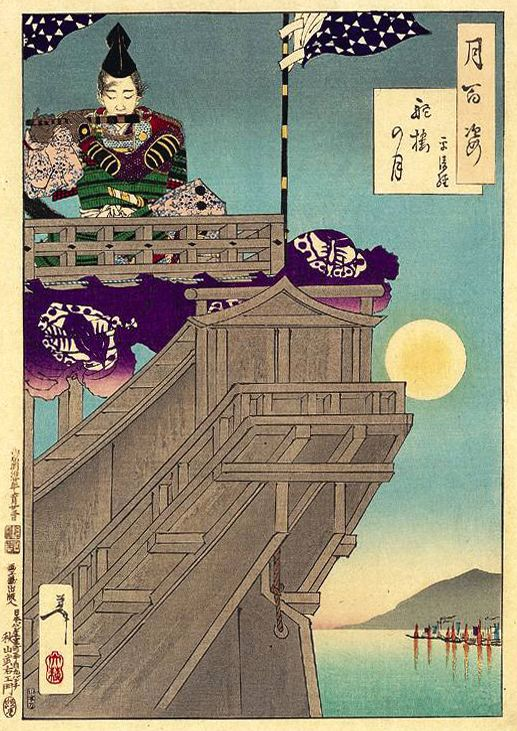

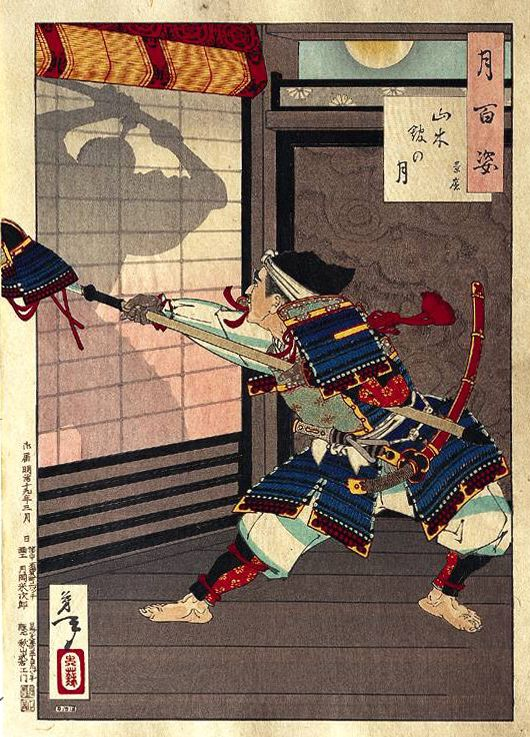

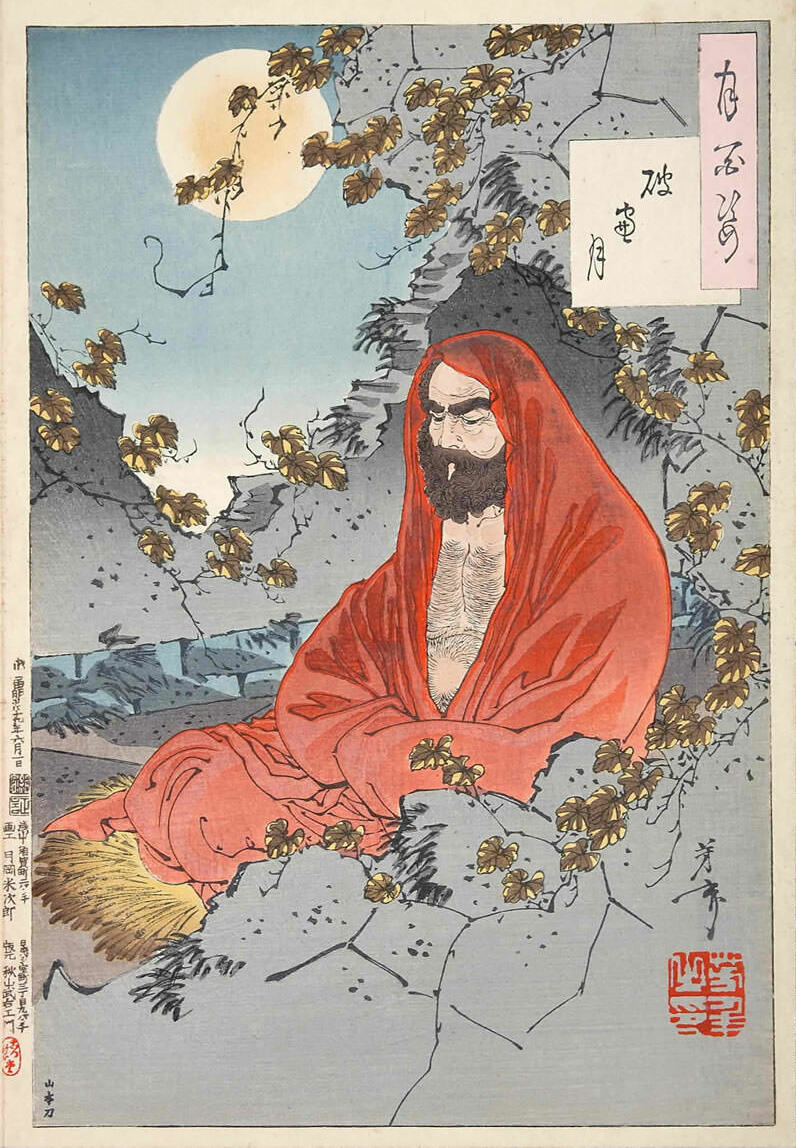

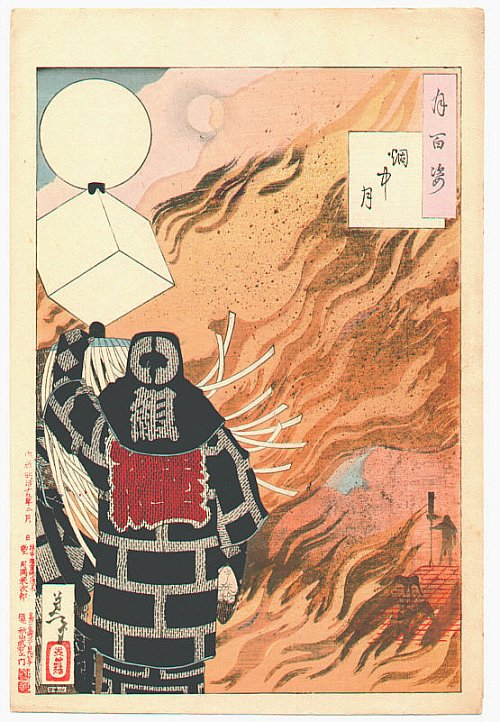

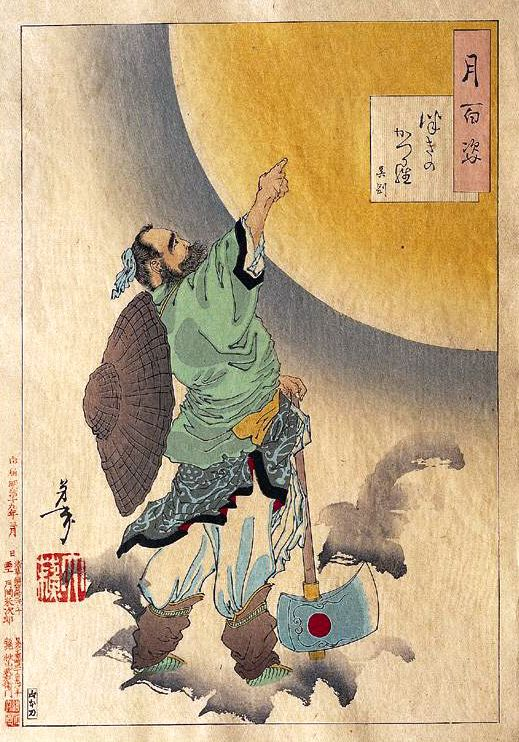

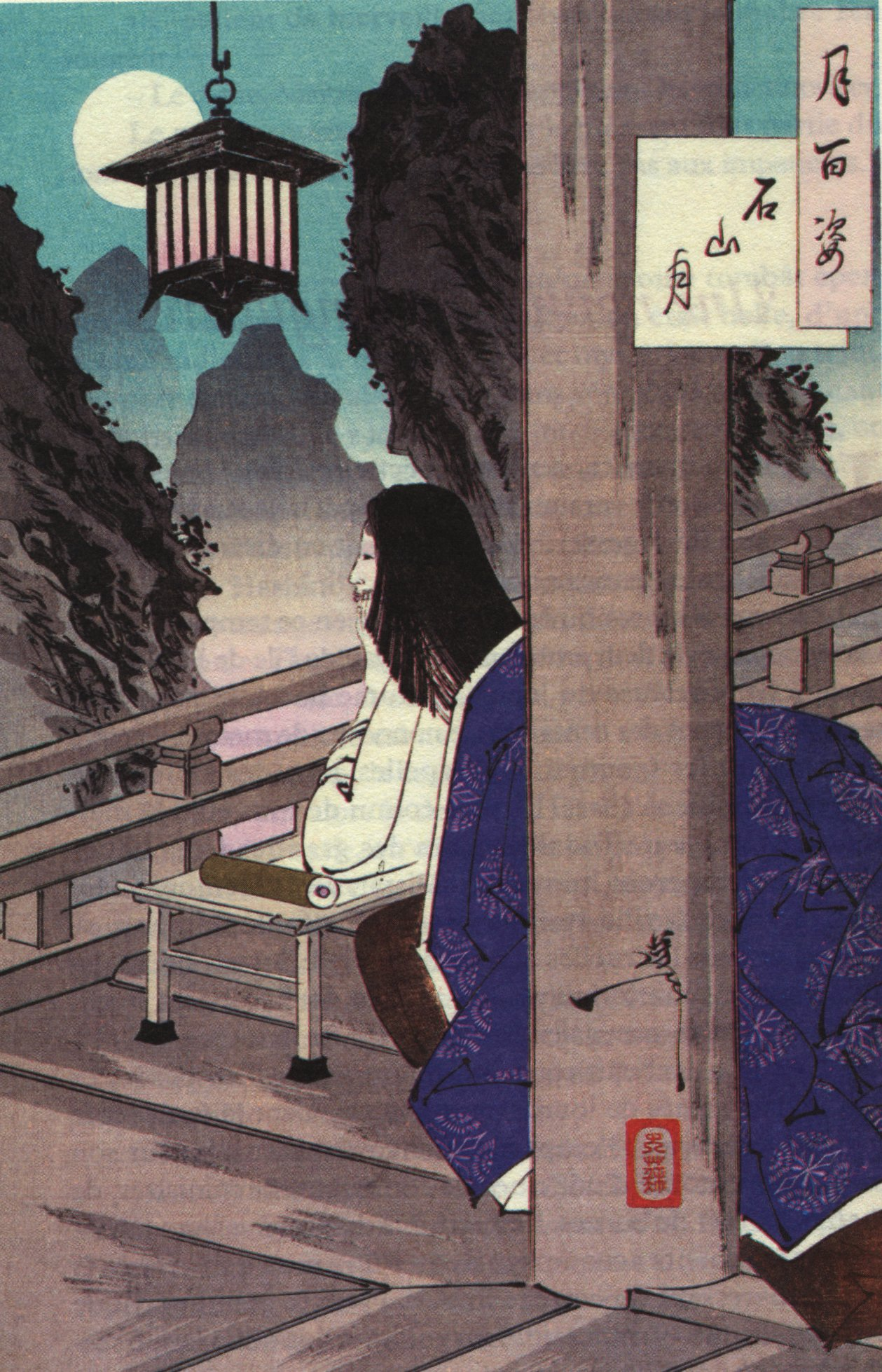

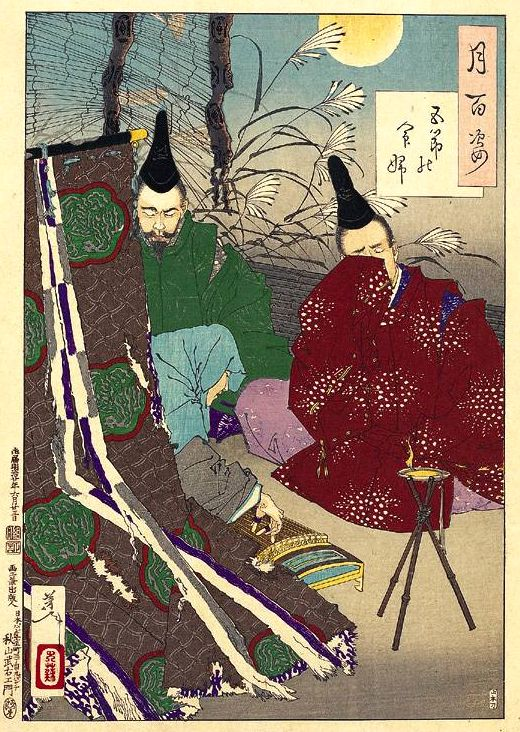

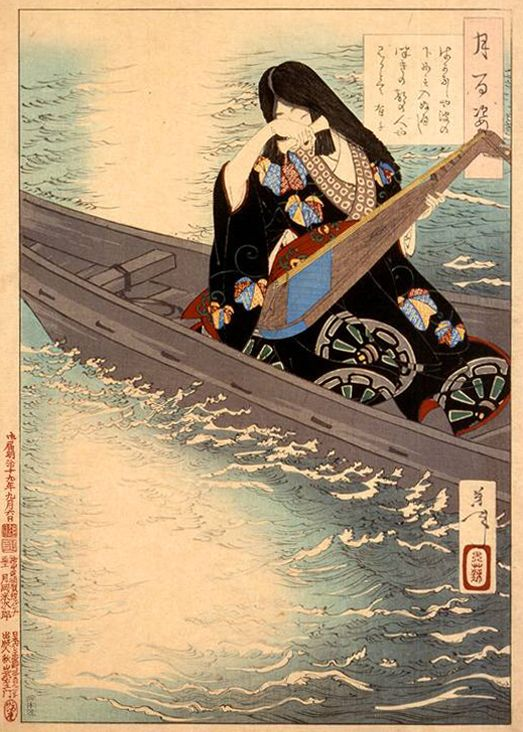

== Mirror of Famous Generals of Great Japan ==
Yoshitoshi's series Mirror of Famous Generals of Great Japan consists of fifty-one woodblocks, published in his middle years, between 1877 -1882.

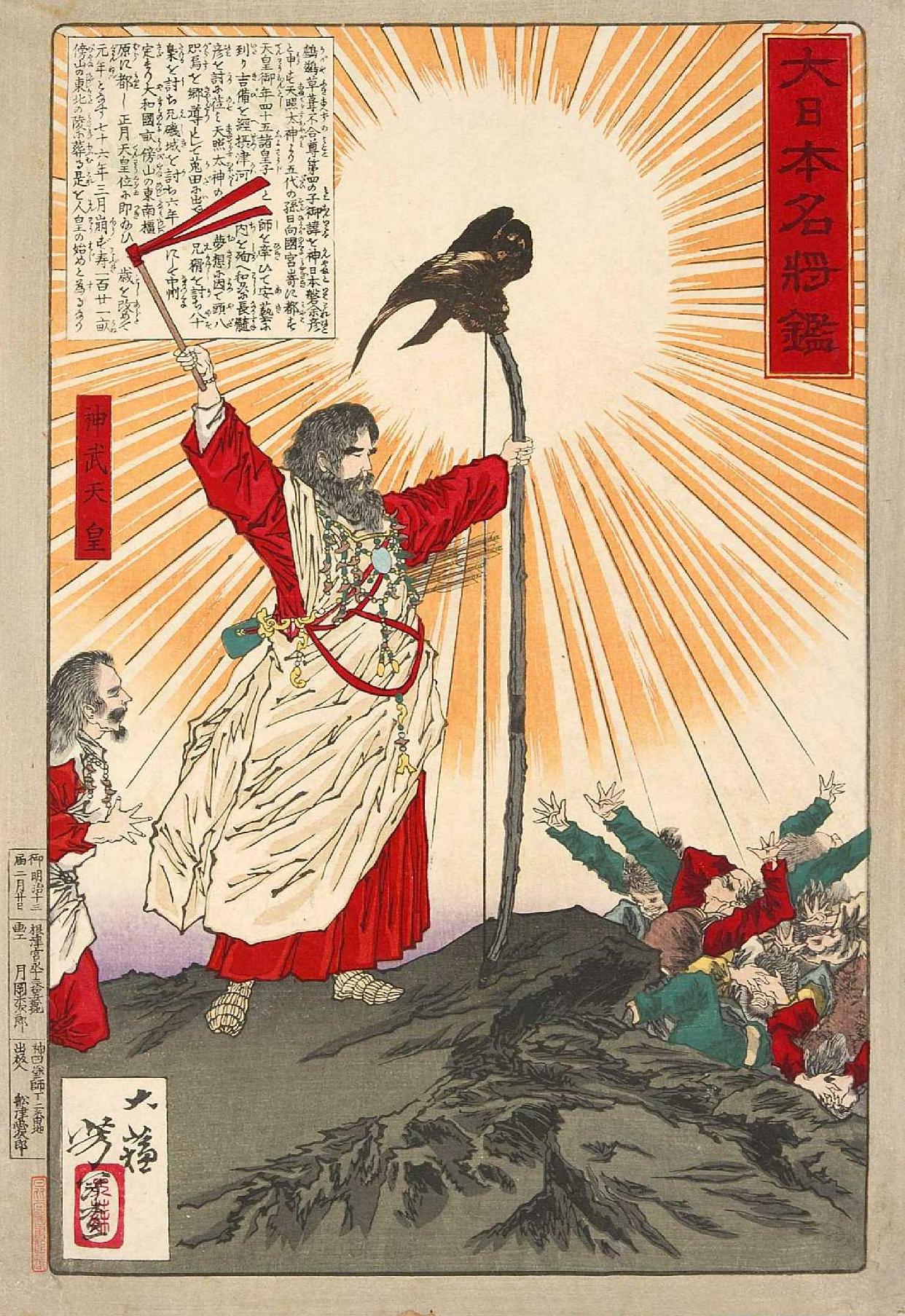
Depiction of a bearded Emperor Jimmu with his emblematic long bow and an accompanying three-legged crow

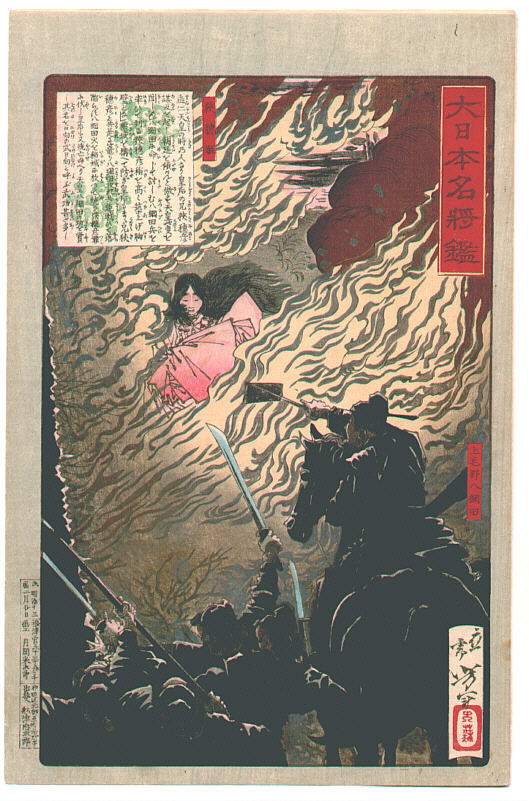
Kamitsuke no Yatsunada attacking Saohime's castle

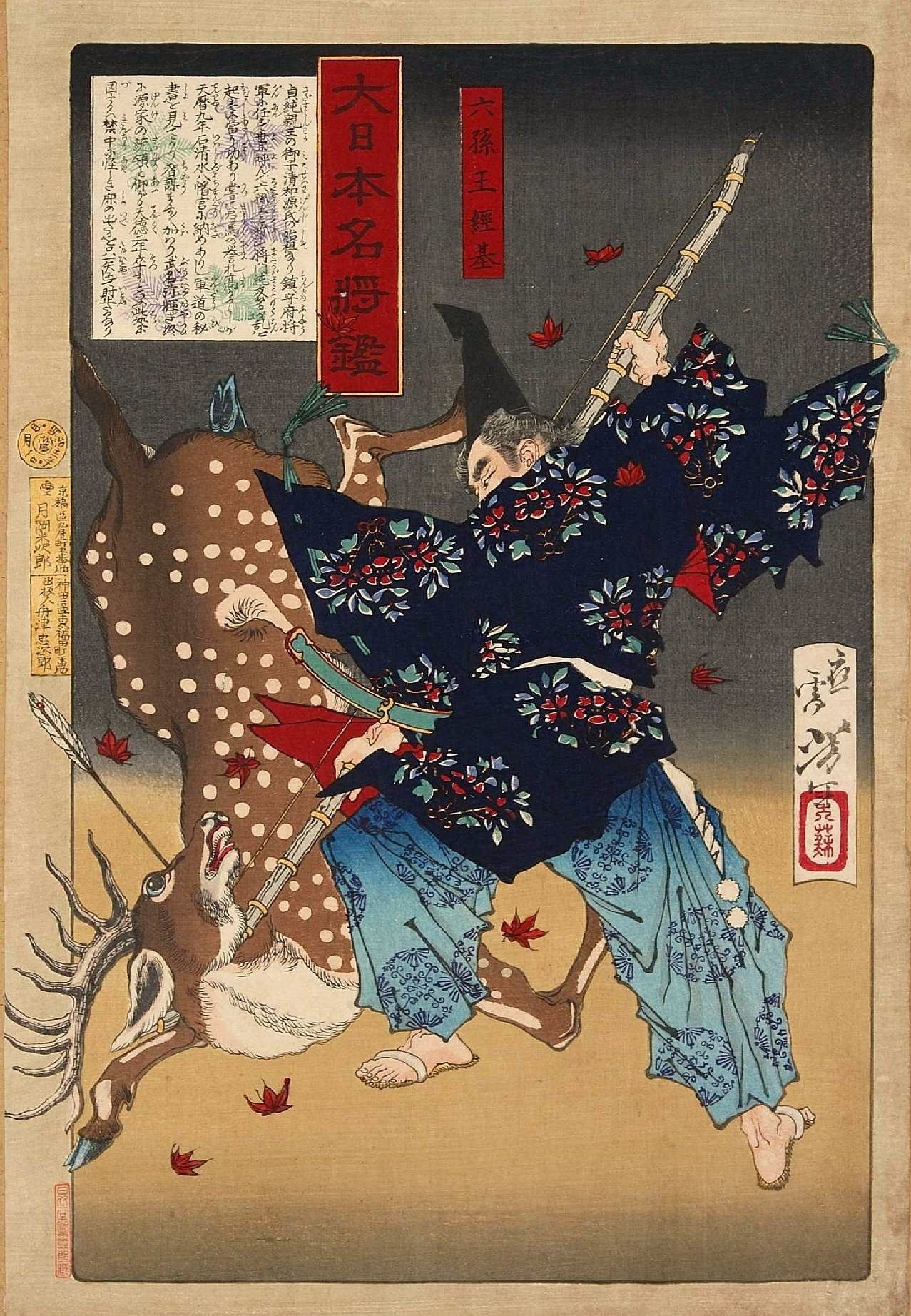
Roku Son'ō Tsunemoto (also known as Minamoto no Tsunemoto)

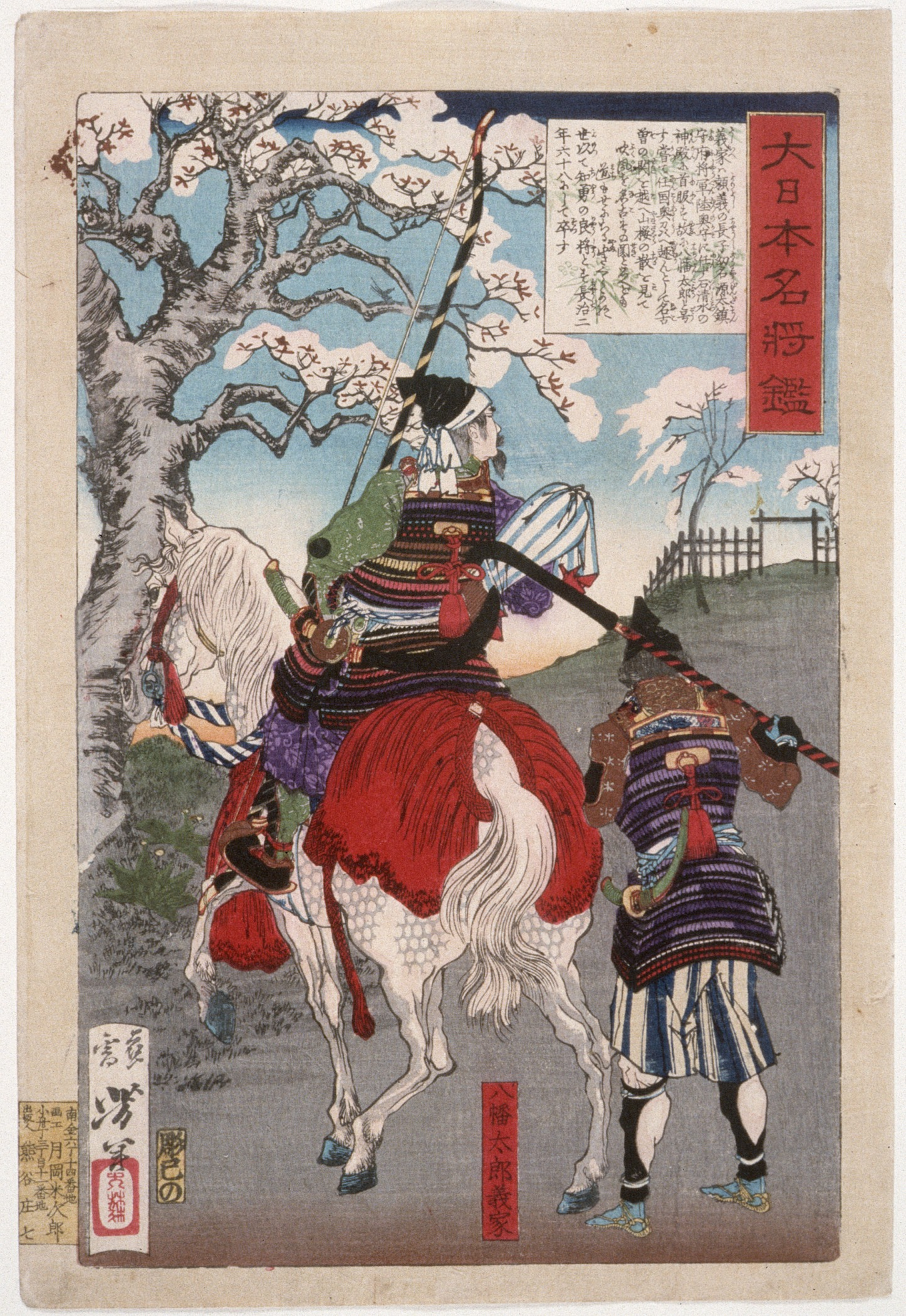
Minamoto no Yoshiie

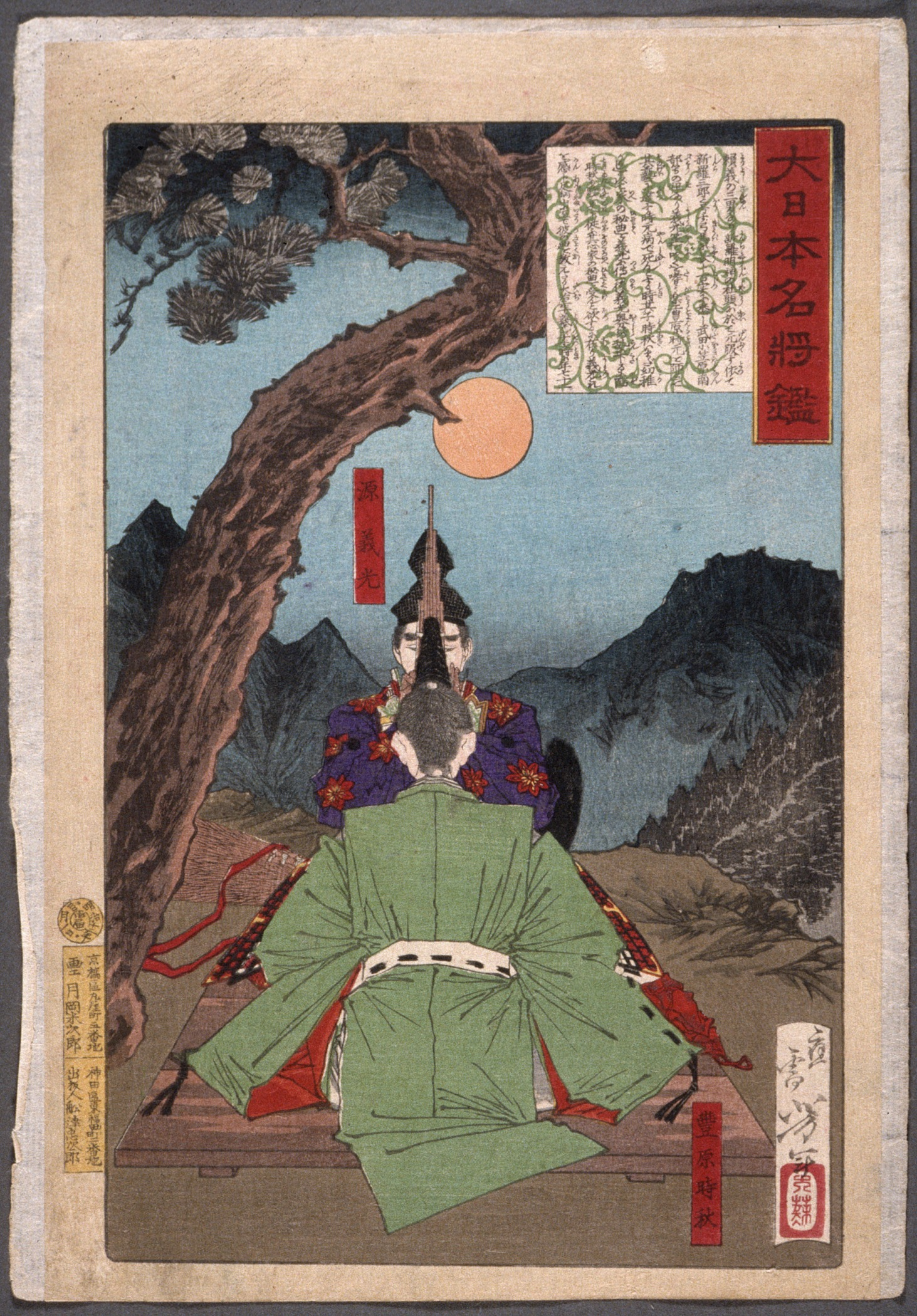
Minamoto no Yoshimitsu Instructing Toyohara no Tokiaki in Music

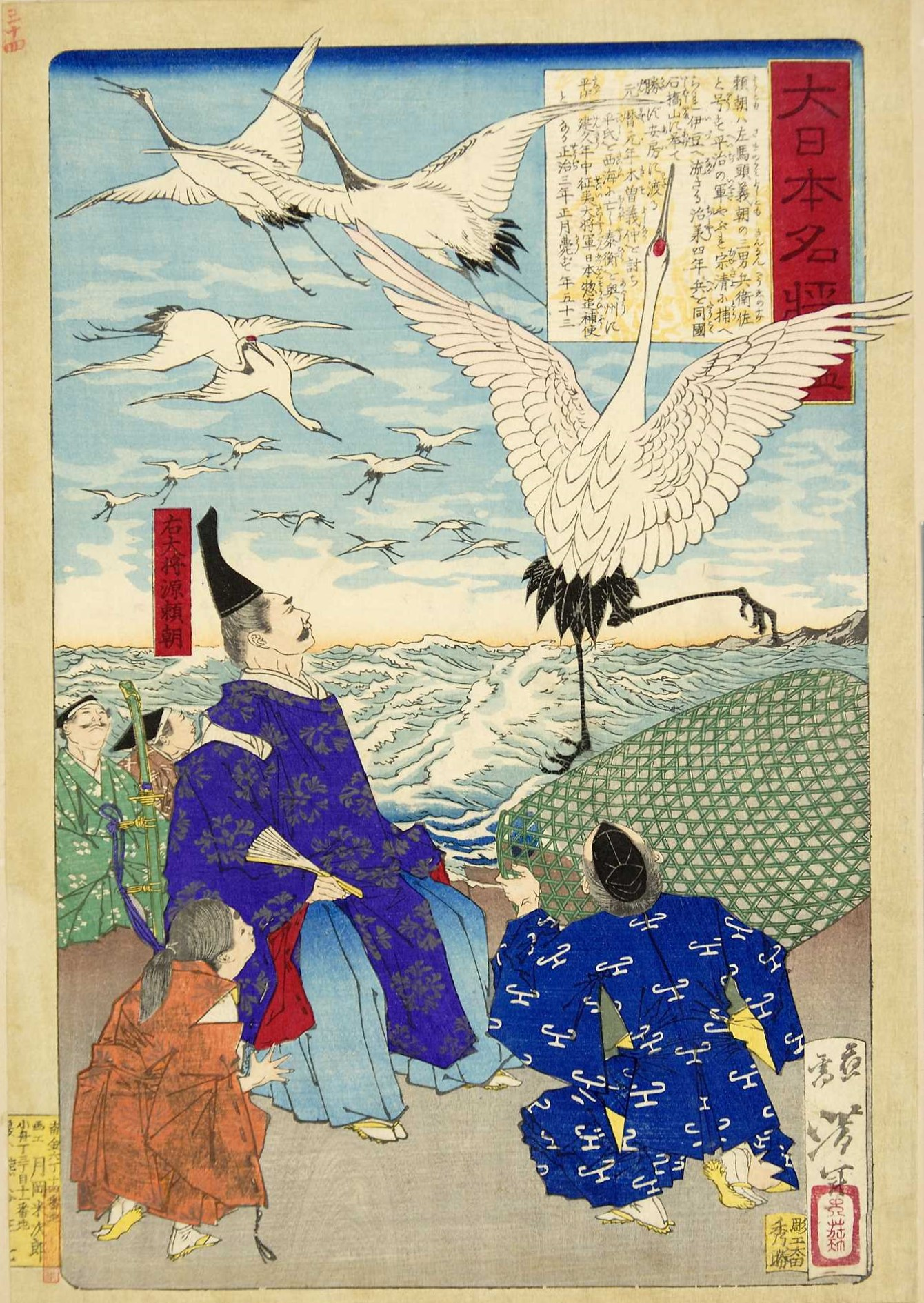
Minamoto no Yoritomo and his retainers releasing cranes to mourn for the war dead in the Mutsu and Dewa Conquest

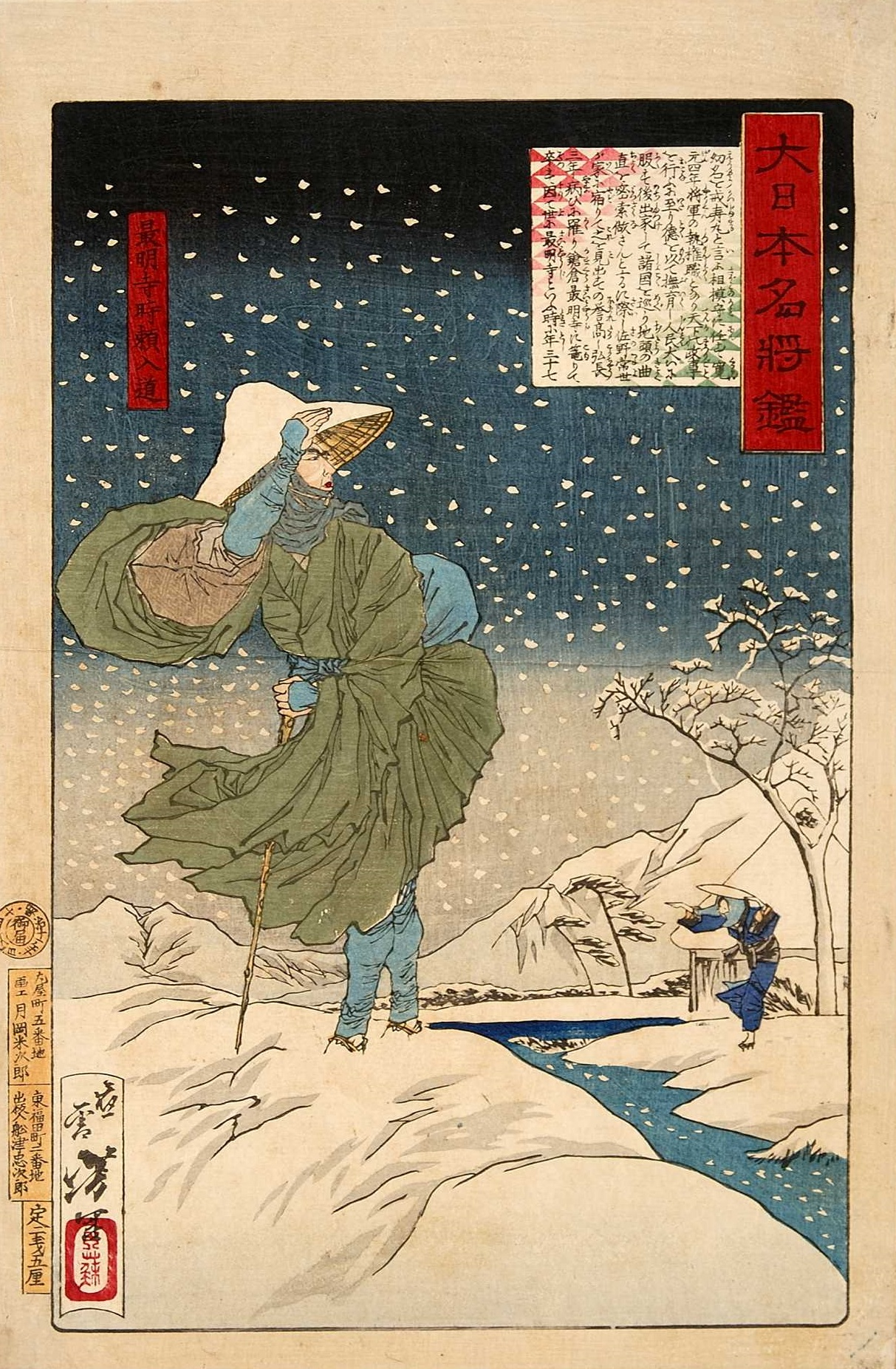
Saimyō-ji Tokiyori (also known as Hōjō Tokiyori)

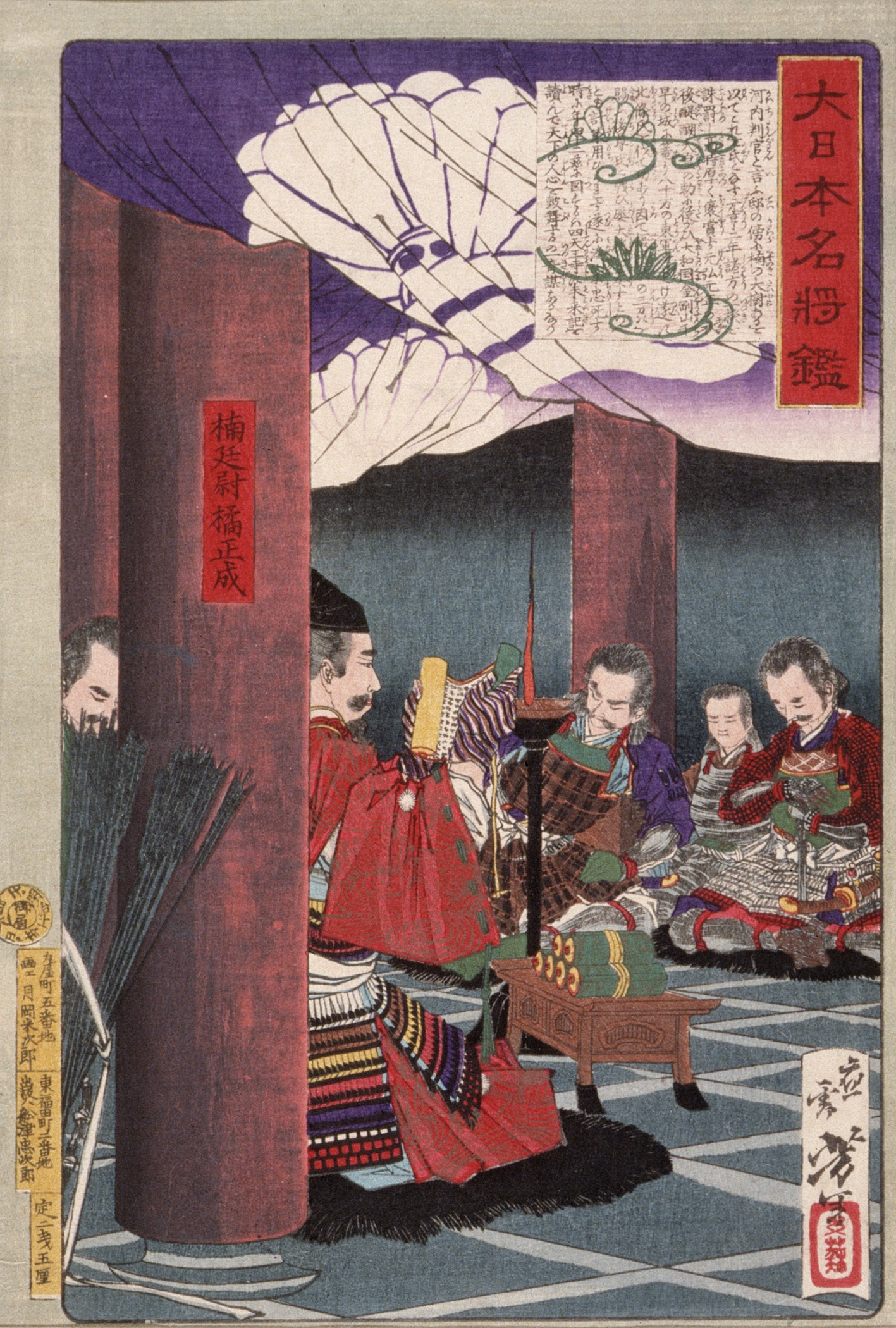
Kusunoki Masashige

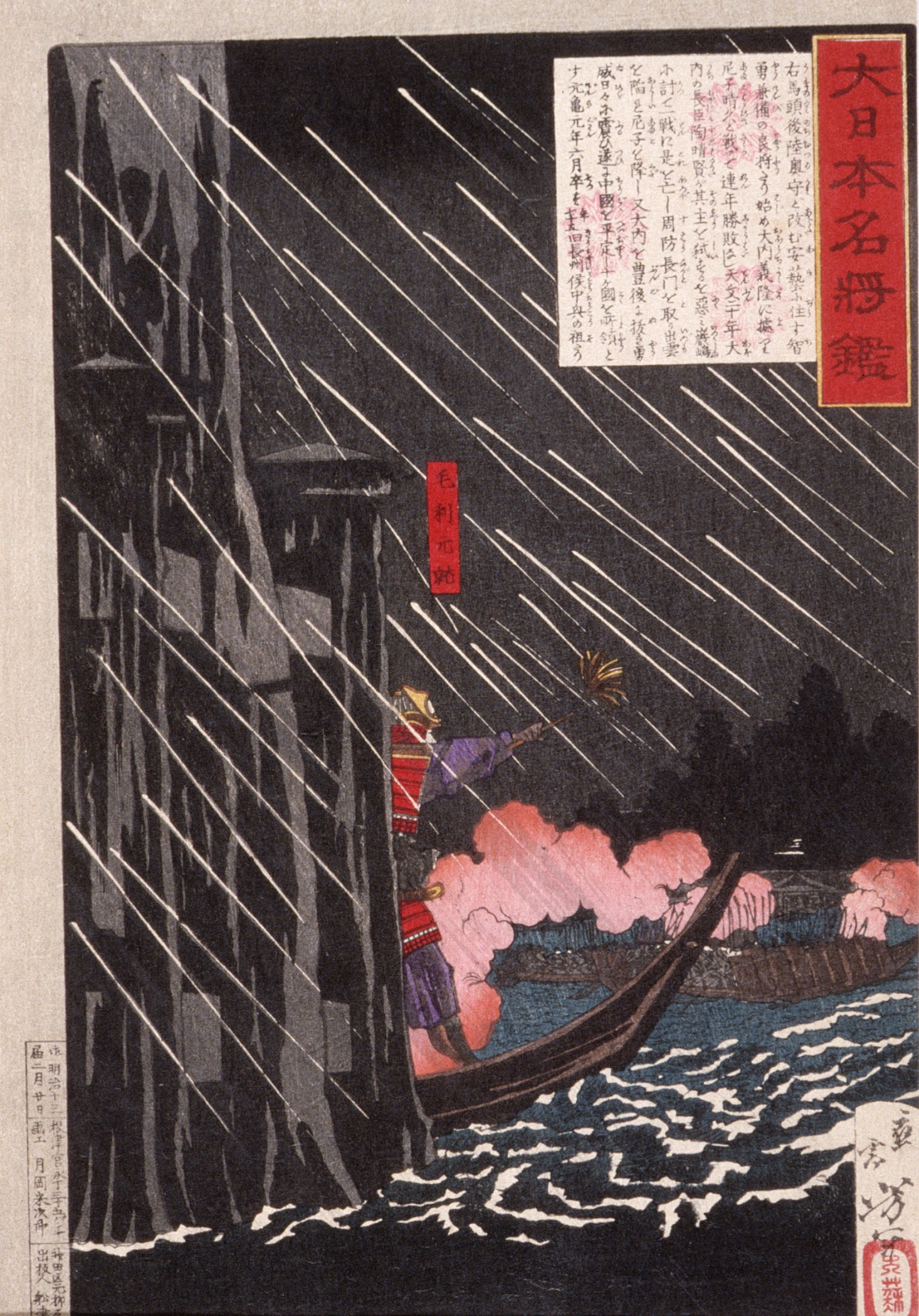
Mori Motonari

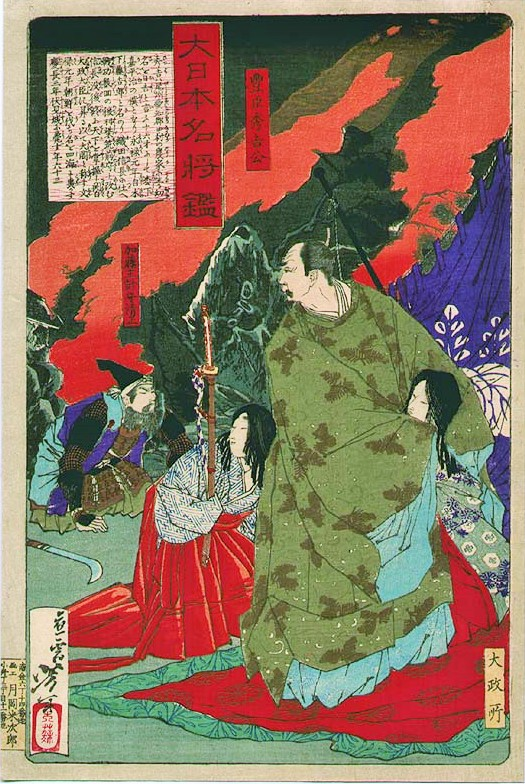
Toyotomi hideyoshi and Kato Kiyomasa

== Notable artwork ==
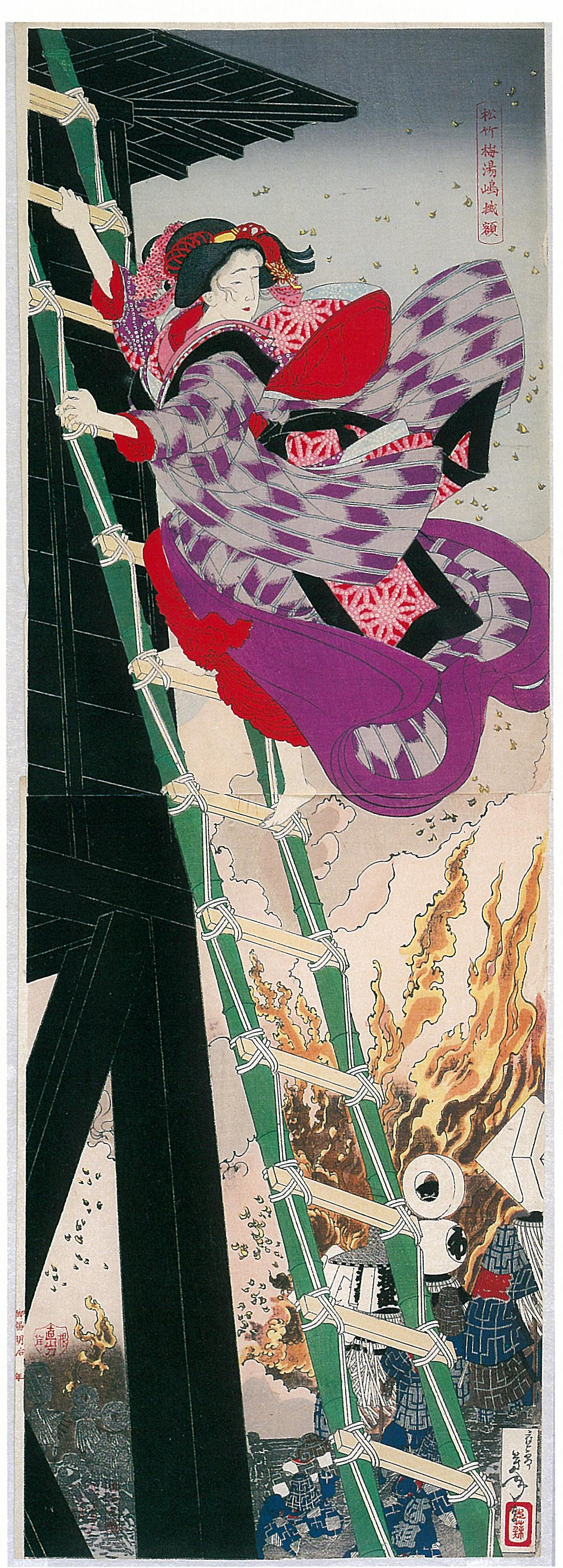
"Yaoya Oshichi"

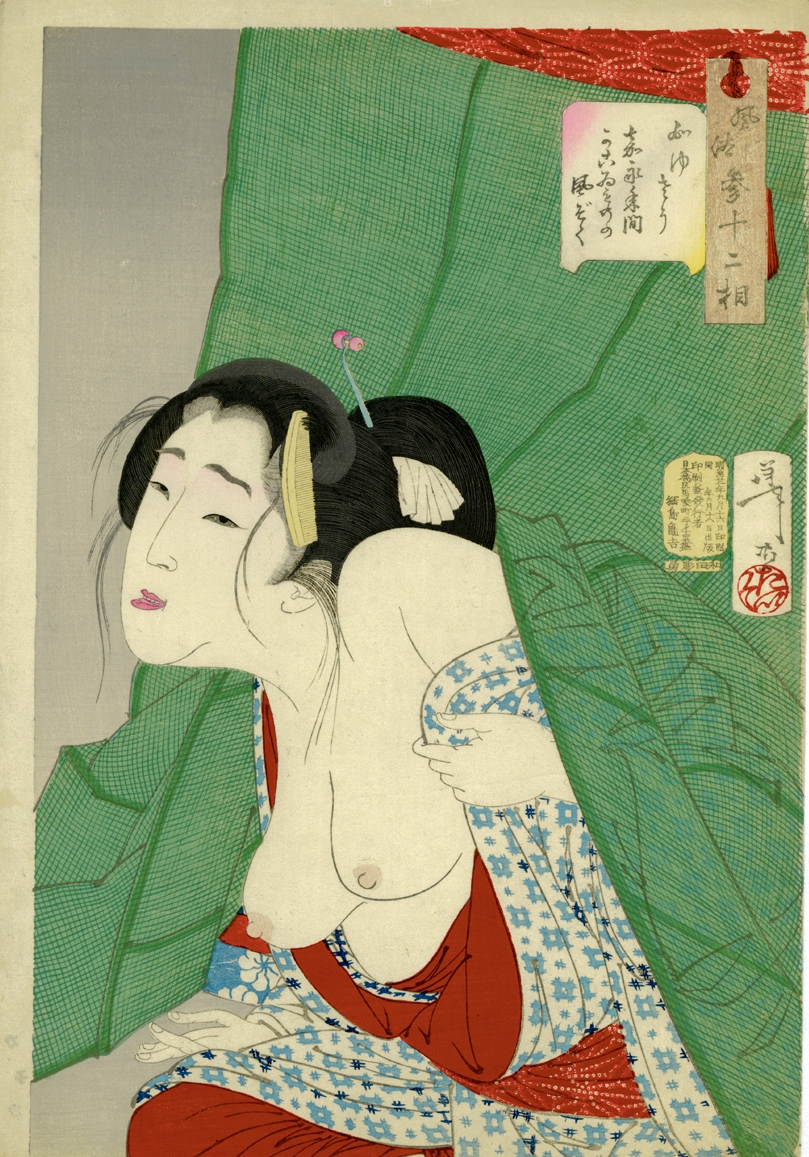
Design from Yoshitoshi's well-known series of beautiful women Fuzoku Sanjuniso (1888)

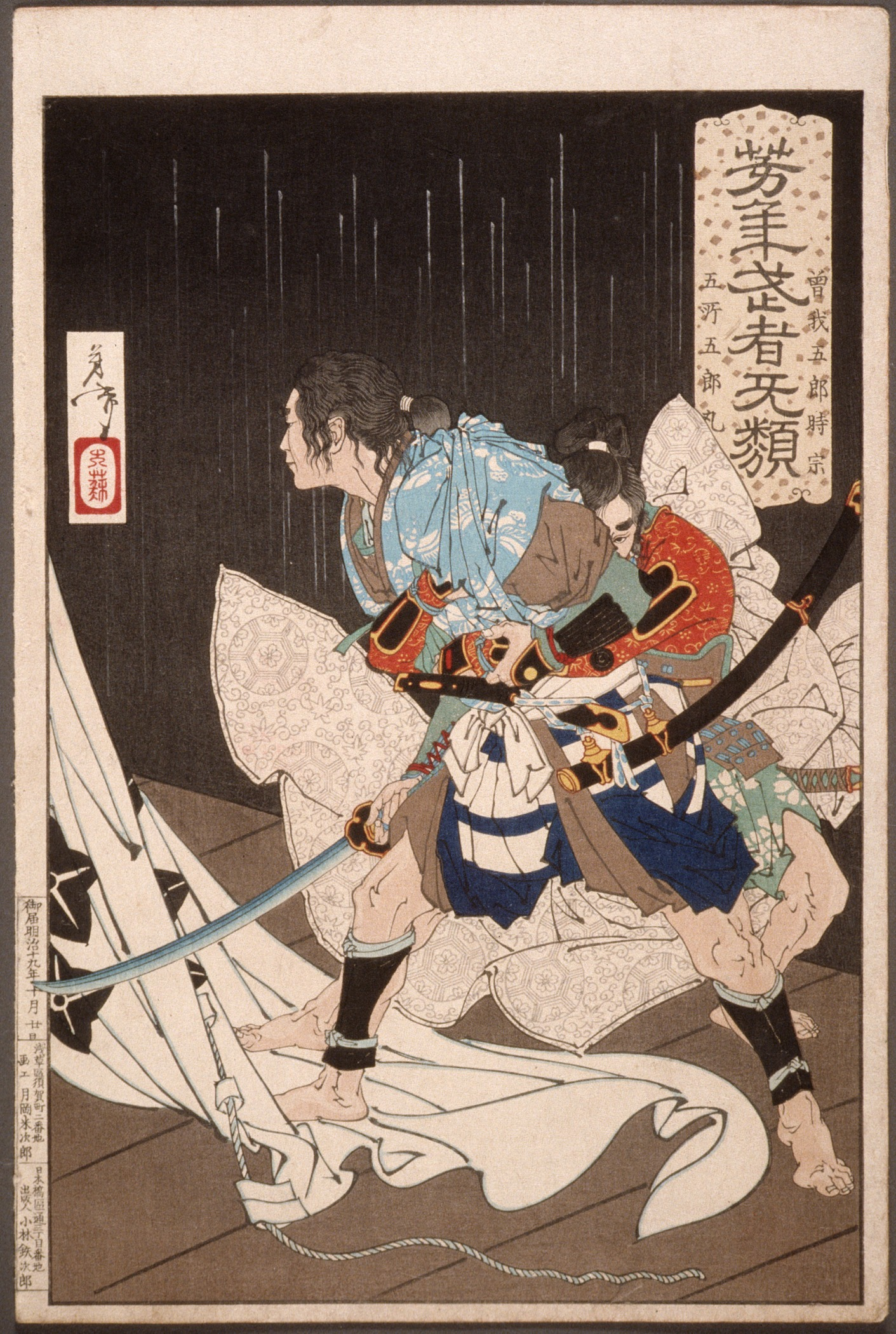
Warriors Trembling with Courage : Gosho no Gorōmaru captures Soga Tokimune. From Revenge of the Soga Brothers.

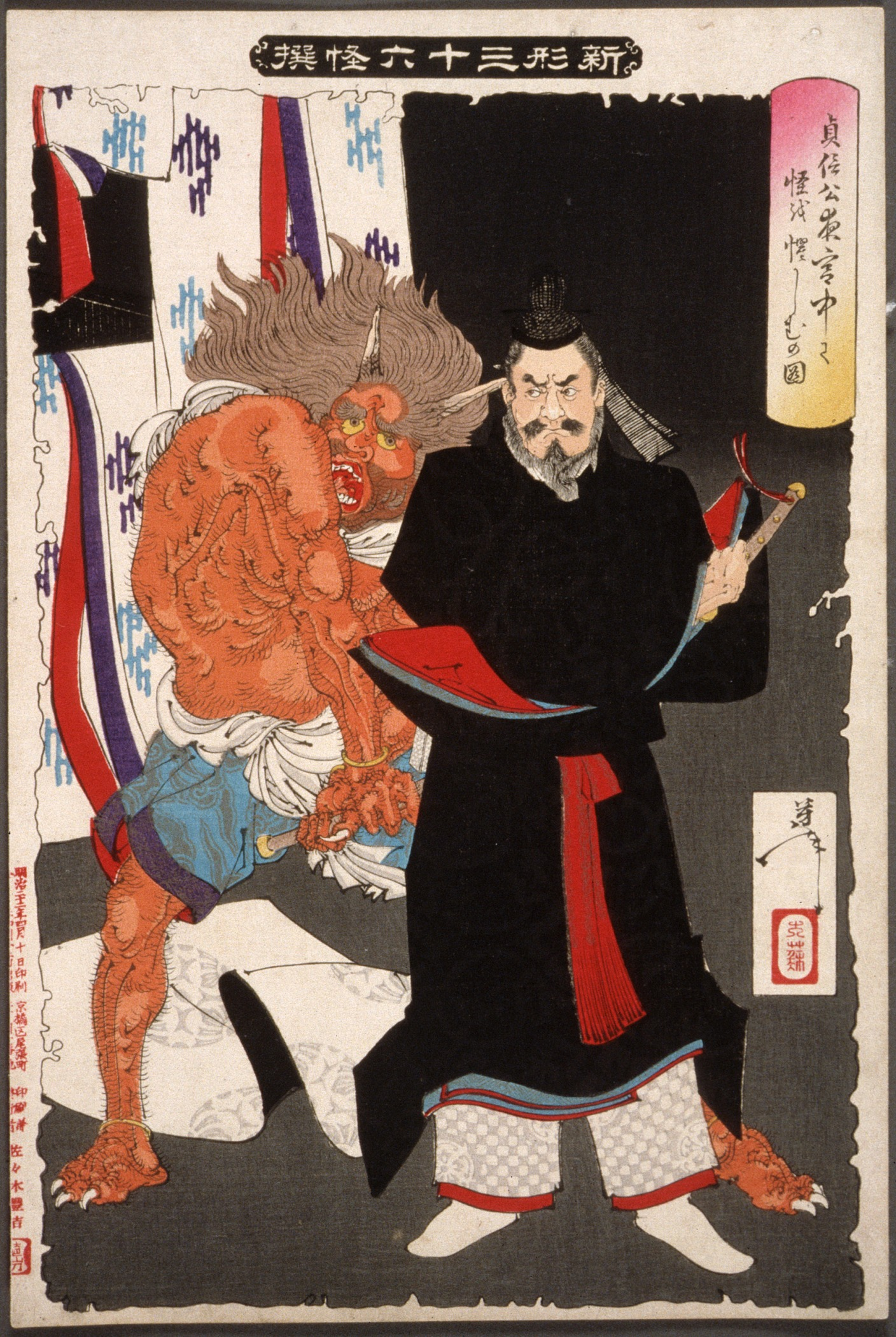
New Forms of Thirty-Six Ghosts: Lord Sadanobu (Fujiwara no Tadahira) Threatens a Demon in the Palace at Night.

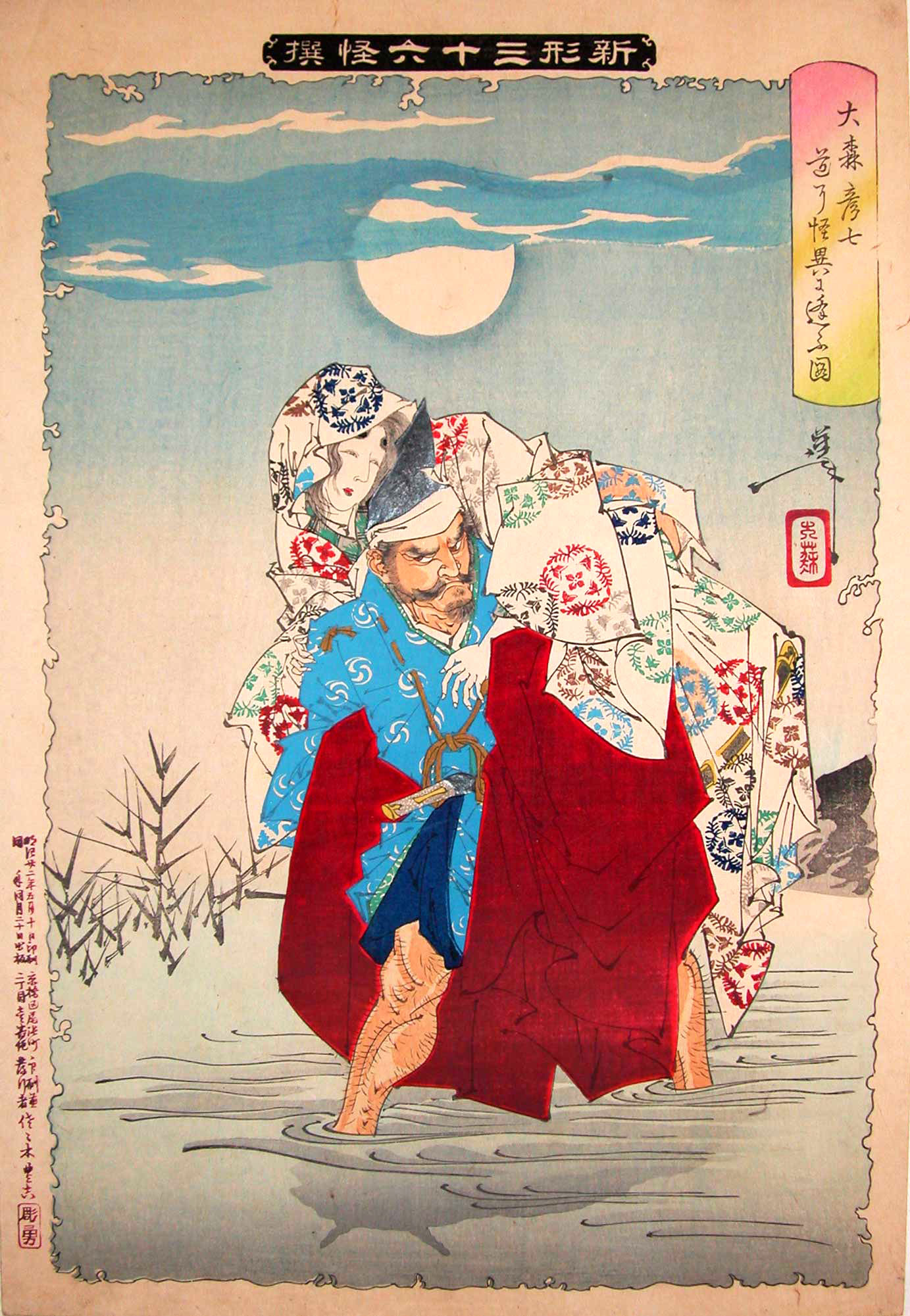
New Forms of Thirty-Six Ghosts: Omori Hikoshichi carrying a woman across a river; as he does so, he sees that she has horns in her reflection.

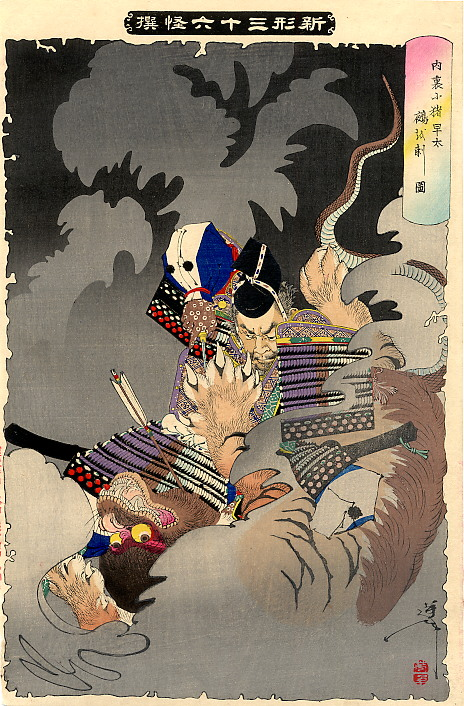
New Forms of Thirty-Six Ghosts: Ii no Hayata killing a Nue at the imperial palace.

== See also ==
- Night in paintings (Eastern art), including One Hundred Aspects of the Moon
