= Waves (Charles Lloyd album) =

Studio album by Charles Lloyd
- Released: 1972
- Recorded: 1972
- Genre: Jazz
- Length: 37:50
- Label: A&M
- Producer: Charles Lloyd

Charles Lloyd chronology
Warm Waters (1971)	Waves (1972)	Geeta (1972)

Waves is an album by jazz saxophonist Charles Lloyd recorded in 1972 by Lloyd and featuring both jazz musicians like guitarist Gábor Szabó and drummer Sonship Theus together with rock artists including Byrds guitarist Roger McGuinn and members of The Beach Boys.

== Reception ==
The Allmusic review by Scott Yanow awarded the album 2 stars and states "This CD reissue is mostly forgettable, finding Lloyd on tenor and flute mostly playing relaxing and soothing solos... most of the music is quite faceless".

Professional ratings
Review scores
Source	Rating
Allmusic	2/5 stars
Christgau's Record Guide	B

Seattle's Jive Time Records' Buckley Mayfield's review: "Waves is a testament to Lloyd’s aptitude for adaptability. He proved that a respected jazz musician could smoothly transition into the precarious freak zone of fusion and hippie rock and create a lasting work—even though too few people realize it.

== Track listing ==
All compositions by Charles Lloyd except as indicated

1. "TM" – 4:58
2. "Pyramid" (Tom Trujillo) – 7:08
3. "Majorca" – 6:10
4. "Harvest" – 8:57
5. "Waves" – 5:17
6. "Rishikisha: Hummingbird" – 1:36
7. "Rishikisha: Rishikesh" (Charles Lloyd, Michael Love) – 1:24
8. "Rishikisha: Seagull" – 2:14

- Recorded at Malibu Road

== Personnel ==
- Charles Lloyd – tenor saxophone, flute, alto flute
- Gábor Szabó (tracks 1, 3 & 4), Tom Trujillo (tracks 2, 5 & 6) guitar
- Roger McGuinn – 12 string guitar (tracks 1 & 5)
- Wolfgang Melz – bass (tracks 1–5)
- Roberto Miranda – bass (tracks 2 & 5)
- Woodrow Theus II – drums, percussion (tracks 1–5)
- Mayuto Correa – percussion (tracks 1, 3 & 4)
- Al Jardine, Billy Hinsche, Carl Wilson, Pamela Polland, Mike Love – vocals (track 1)
- Mike Love – vocals (track 7)

== Production ==
- Eric Sherman, Joan Lloyd – assistant producers
- Roland Young – art direction, photography
- Chuck Beeson – design
- Masami Teraoka – artwork, illustration
