= Warm Waters =

Studio album by Charles Lloyd
- Released: 1971
- Recorded: 1971
- Genre: Jazz
- Label: Kapp
- Producer: Charles Lloyd

Charles Lloyd chronology
Moon Man (1970)	Warm Waters (1971)	Waves (1972)

Warm Waters is an album by jazz saxophonist Charles Lloyd recorded in 1971 and released on the Kapp label featuring performances by Lloyd with John Cipollina, Dave Mason, Tom Trujillo, Woodrow Theus II, Ken Jenkins, Bill Wolff, James Zitro, Jesse Ed Davis, and Michael Cohen with guest vocalists Mike Love, Al Jardine, Billy Cowsill, Michael O'Gara, Brian Wilson, Eric Sherman, Carl Wilson and Rhetta Hughes. The album appeared in Europe the same year on the MCA label in West Germany (MAPS 4961) with the same track listing.

== Reception ==
Professional ratings
Review scores
Source	Rating
AllMusic	2/5 stars

AllMusic awarded the album 2 stars out of five.

== Track listing ==
All compositions by Charles Lloyd except as indicated

1. "All Life is One" – 3:42
2. "How Sweet" (Charles Lloyd, Mike Love) – 2:22
3. "Memphis Belle" – 2:33
4. "Freedom" (Kenneth Jenkins) – 3:55
5. "Dear Dr. Ehret" – 2:58
6. "Rusty Toy" – 5:25
7. "New Anthem/Warm Waters" – 8:35
8. "It's Getting Late/Good Night" – 4:40

- Recorded at Malibu Road, Brother Studios, A&M, Poppi, and Village Recorders

== Personnel ==
- Charles Lloyd – tenor saxophone, soprano flute, alto flute, electric piano, organ, piano, vocals
- Dave Mason – 12 string guitar, acoustic guitar (tracks 1 & 2)
- John Cipollina – steel guitar, electric guitar, space guitar (tracks 1, 2, 5, 6, & 8)
- Mike Love – vocals (tracks 1 & 2)
- Al Jardine, Billy Cowsill, Michael O'Gara, Brian Wilson, Eric Sherman – vocals (track 1)
- Rhetta Hughes – vocals (tracks 1, 2, 6 & 7)
- Carl Wilson – vocals, synthesizer (track 1)
- Woodrow Theus II – percussion, drums (tracks 1 & 3–8)
- Tom Trujillo – electric guitar, bass (tracks 3–8)
- Ken Jenkins – bass, vocals (tracks 4 & 8)
- Bill Wolff – guitar, vocals (tracks 4 & 8)
- James Zitro – drums, vocals (tracks 4 & 8)
- Jesse Ed Davis – guitar (track 6)
- Michael Cohen – piano, organ (track 8)
