= Soundtrack (Charles Lloyd album) =

Live album by Charles Lloyd
- Released: January 17, 1969
- Recorded: November 15, 1968
- Genre: Jazz
- Length: 38:38
- Label: Atlantic
- Producer: George Avakian

Charles Lloyd chronology
Charles Lloyd in the Soviet Union (1967)	Soundtrack (1969)	Moon Man (1970)

Soundtrack is a live album by jazz saxophonist Charles Lloyd recorded at The Town Hall, New York City in 1968 by the Charles Lloyd Quartet featuring Keith Jarrett, Ron McClure and Jack DeJohnette.

== Reception ==
The Allmusic review by Thom Jurek awarded the album 4 stars and states "Soundtrack, stomps with all the fury of a live gospel choir trying to claim Saturday night for God instead of the other guy... The band is in a heavy Latin mood, where the blues, samba, bossa, hard bop, modal, and even soul are drenched in the blues. With only four tunes presented, the Charles Lloyd Quartet, while a tad more dissonant than it had been in 1966 and 1967, swings much harder, rougher, and get-to-the-groove quicker than any band Lloyd had previously led... This band would split soon after, when Jarrett left to play with Miles Davis, but if this was a live swansong, they couldn't have picked a better gig to issue".

Professional ratings
Review scores
Source	Rating
Allmusic	4/5 stars
The Penguin Guide to Jazz Recordings	3/4 stars

== Track listing ==
All compositions by Charles Lloyd

1. "Sombrero Sam" - 10:26
2. "Voice in the Night - 9:06
3. "Pre-Dawn" - 2:34
4. "Forest Flower '69" - 16:51

- Recorded on November 15, 1968, at the Town Hall, New York City

== Personnel ==
- Charles Lloyd - tenor saxophone, flute
- Keith Jarrett - piano
- Ron McClure - bass
- Jack DeJohnette - drums

== Production ==
- Eric Sherman - cover concept, photography
- Haig Adishian - design
- George Avakian - producer
