= Masami Teraoka =

Japanese painter (born 1936)

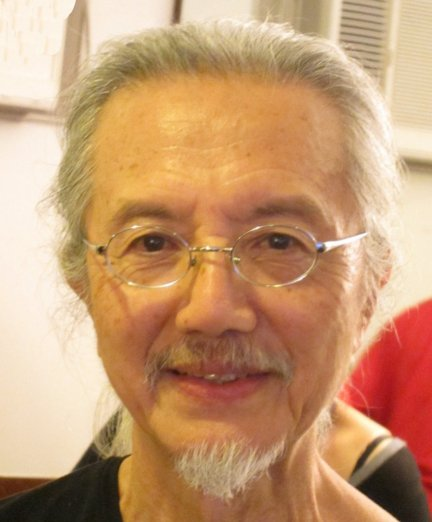
- Teraoka in 2011
- Born: 1936 (age 89–90); Onomichi, Hiroshima Prefecture
- Education: Kwansei Gakuin University; Otis College of Art and Design
- Awards: National Endowment for the Arts; American Academy of Arts and Letters

Signature
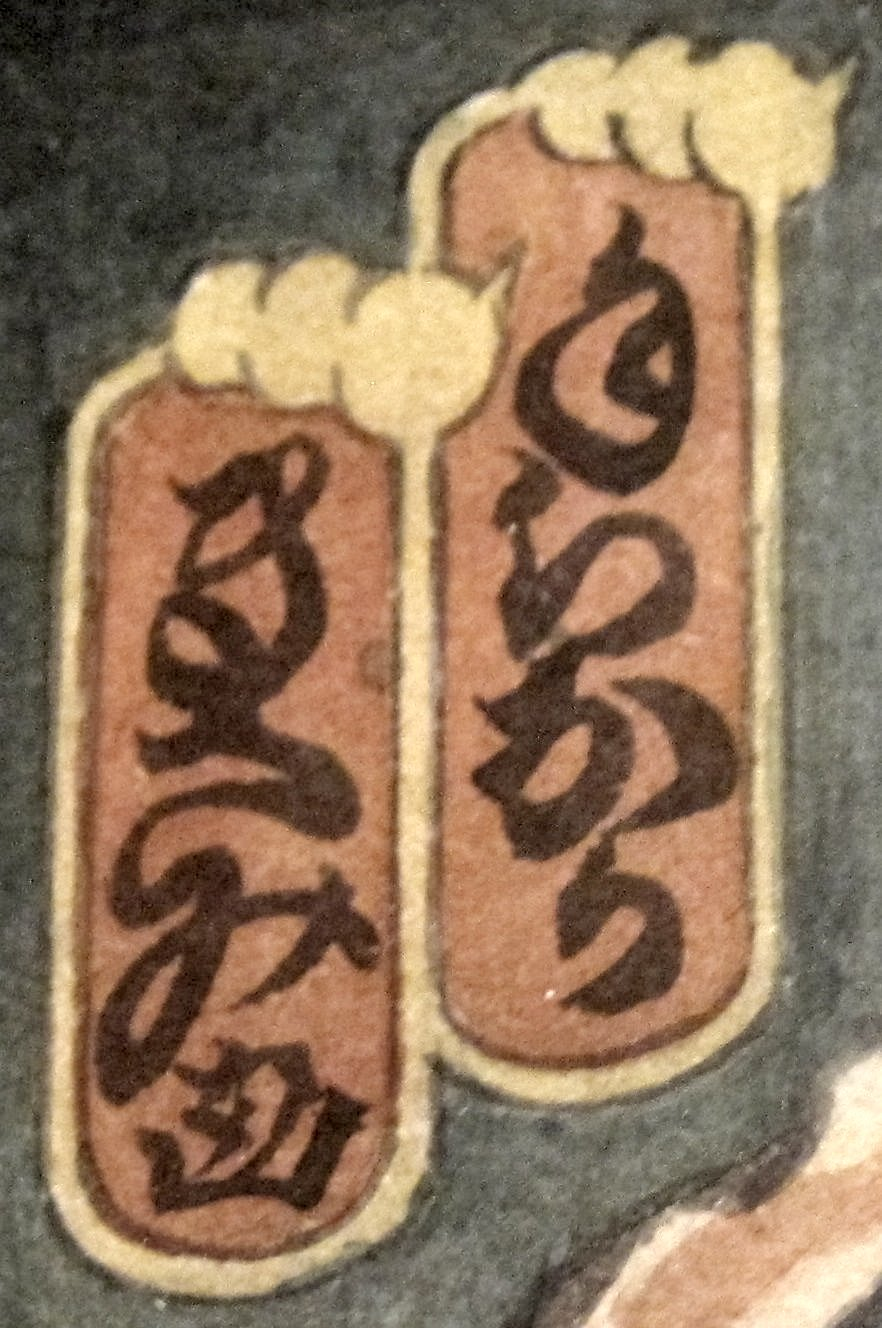
- Website: masamiteraoka.com

Masami Teraoka (born 1936) is an American contemporary artist. His work includes Ukiyo-e-influenced woodcut prints and paintings in watercolor and oil. He is known for work that merges traditional Edo-style aesthetics with icons of American culture.

== Education ==
Teraoka was born in the town of Onomichi in Hiroshima Prefecture. He studied from 1954–59 at the Kwansei Gakuin University in Kobe, Japan where he received his B.A. in Aesthetics. He moved to the United States in 1961. From 1964 to 1968 he attended and graduated from the Otis Art Institute, now the Otis College of Art and Design in Los Angeles, where he received a B.F.A. and M.F.A. He received an honorary doctorate in the fine arts in 2016 from the Otis College of Art and Design.

== Works ==
'Hanauma Bay Series: Ronin Samuri', watercolor by Masami Teraoka, 1982, Hawaii State Art Museum

The Cloisters / Tsunami by Masami Teraoka, 2002-2005, Honolulu Museum of Art

Teraoka's combines merges traditional Edo-style aesthetics with icons of American culture. His early work consisted primarily of watercolor paintings and prints that mimicked the flat, bold qualities of ukiyo-e woodblock prints. These paintings, done after his arrival in the United States, often featured the collision of the two cultures. Series such as McDonald's Hamburgers Invading Japan and 31 Flavors Invading Japan characterize themes in the work in this time period. These pieces blended reality with fantasy, humor with commentary, history with the present.

In the 1980s, Teraoka shifted palette and scale to depict AIDS as a subject, transforming his ukiyo-e derived paintings into a darker realm. In 1989 during a trip to Australia, he realized that the general public as well as some medical practitioners did not fully understand the impact the virus could have on the Australian populace. He created watercolors based on traditional woodblock prints that depicted kitsune foxes who represent, in Japanese folklore, divine entities who operate as messengers.

Since the late 1990s, he has been producing large-scale narrative paintings inspired by well-known Renaissance paintings, rather than by Japanese woodblock prints. These paintings reference modern day social and political issues, such as the September 11 attacks and abuse in the Catholic Church. The Cloisters / Tsunami in the collection of the Honolulu Museum of Art, depicts Towers of Babel as the twin towers of the World Trade Center and fallen priests. This painting also includes a self-portrait in the left upper corner. The series also depicts the institutionalized sexual abuse within the Catholic Church.

Teraoka has been the subject of more than 70 solo exhibitions, many of which have traveled extensively, including those organized by the Whitney Museum of American Art in 1980; The Contemporary Museum, Honolulu (now known as the Honolulu Museum of Art Spalding House) in 1988; and the Yale University Art Gallery in 1998. In 1996, he was featured in a solo exhibition at the Arthur M. Sackler Gallery, Smithsonian Institution and in 1997 at the Asian Art Museum, San Francisco.

Teraoka has received numerous grants, fellowships and awards for his work. He was twice honored by the American Academy of Arts and Letters, New York and received two fellowships from the National Endowment for the Arts.

=== Monographs ===
In 1988 the University of California Press published Waves and Plagues: The Art of Masami Teraoka. In 1997, Masami Teraoka: From Tradition to Technology, the Floating World was published by the University of Michigan Press. A comprehensive monograph on the artist was published in 2006 by Chronicle Books.

== Collections ==
His work is in more than 50 public collections worldwide, including the Crocker Art Museum, Sacramento, CA; the Fine Arts Museums of San Francisco; the Asian Art Museum of San Francisco; the Smithsonian American Art Museum, Washington D. C.; the Honolulu Museum of Art, Hawaii; the Los Angeles County Museum of Art; the Metropolitan Museum of Art, New York; the National Portrait Gallery, Washington D. C.; Tate Modern, London, England; the Queensland Art Gallery/GOMA, Brisbane, Australia; the Gallery of Modern Art, Glasgow, Scotland; and the Singapore Art Museum, Singapore.

== Personal life ==
Terakoa is divorced from Terry Rhodes and Lynda Hess, and lives in Hawaii. He has a son and a daughter.
