= ECM Records discography =

A discography of albums released by ECM. Distributor catalogue numbers are not provided here.

== Discography ==
=== ECM 10xx – ===
Catalog number	Year	Artist	Title	Date recorded	Notes
ECM 1001 ST	1970-01	Mal Waldron Trio	Free at Last	Recorded 1969-11-24, Musikstudio Bauer, Ludwigsburg	
ECM 1002 ST	1970-05	Alfred Harth's Just Music	Just Music	Recorded 1969-12-13, Nettekoven Studios, Frankfurt/Main	
ECM 1003 ST	1970-12	Paul Bley Trio	Paul Bley with Gary Peacock	Recorded 1964, 1968, New York	
ECM 1004 ST	1970-11	Marion Brown	Afternoon of a Georgia Faun	Recorded 1970-08-10, Sound Ideas Studio, New York	
ECM 1005 ST	1970-11	The Music Improvisation Company	The Music Improvisation Company	Recorded 1970-08-25, -26, -27, Merstham Studios, London	
ECM 1006 ST	1970-12	Wolfgang Dauner Trio	Output	Recorded 1970-9-15, 1970-10-01, Tonstudio Bauer, Ludwigsburg	
ECM 1007 ST	1971-01	Jan Garbarek Quartet	Afric Pepperbird	Recorded 1970-09-22, -23, Bendiksen Studio, Oslo	
ECM 1008 ST	1971-03	Robin Kenyatta	Girl from Martinique	Recorded 1970-10-30, Tonstudio Bauer, Ludwigsburg	
ECM 1009 ST	1971-04	Chick Corea / David Holland / Barry Altschul	A.R.C.	Recorded 1971-01-11, -12, -13, Tonstudio Bauer, Ludwigsburg	
ECM 1010 ST	1971-03	Paul Bley	Ballads	Recorded Recorded March and July 1967, New York	
ECM 1011 ST	1971-05	David Holland / Barre Phillips	Music from Two Basses	Recorded 1971-02-15, Tonstudio Bauer, Ludwigsburg	
ECM 1012 ST	1971-09	Bobo Stenson	Underwear	Recorded 1971-05-18, -19, Arne Bendiksen Studio, Oslo	
ECM 1013 ST	1971-10	David Holland / Derek Bailey	Improvisations for Cello and Guitar	Recorded 1971-01 live, Little Theater Club, London, January 1971	
ECM 1014	1971-08	Chick Corea	Piano Improvisations Vol. 1	Recorded April 1971, Recorded Arne Bendiksen Studio, Oslo	
ECM 1015	1971-11	Jan Garbarek Quintet	Sart	Recorded April 1971, Arne Bendiksen Studio, Oslo	
ECM 1016	1971-11	Terje Rypdal	Terje Rypdal	Recorded August 1971, Arne Bendiksen Studio, Oslo	
ECM 1017	1972-03	Keith Jarrett	Facing You	Recorded November 1971, Arne Bendiksen Studio, Oslo	
ECM 1018/19	1971-05	Circle	Paris-Concert	Recorded February 1971, Maison de l'O.R.T.F., Paris	
ECM 1020	1972-03	Chick Corea	Piano Improvisations Vol. 2	Recorded April 1971, Arne Bendiksen Studio, Oslo	
ECM 1021	1973-01	Keith Jarrett / Jack DeJohnette	Ruta and Daitya	Recorded May 1971, Sunset Studios, Los Angeles	
ECM 1022	1972-07	Chick Corea	Return to Forever	Recorded February 1972, A & R Studios, New York	
ECM 1023	1973-02	Paul Bley	Open, to Love	Recorded September 1972, Arne Bendiksen Studio, Oslo	
ECM 1024	1973-04	Gary Burton / Chick Corea	Crystal Silence	Recorded November 1972, Arne Bendiksen Studio, Oslo	
ECM 1025	1973-06	Ralph Towner with Glen Moore	Trios / Solos	Recorded November 1972, Sound Ideas Studio, New York	
ECM 1026	1973-11	Stanley Cowell Trio	Illusion Suite	Recorded November 1972, Sound Ideas Studio, New York	
ECM 1027	1973-06	David Holland Quartet	Conference of the Birds	Recorded November 1972, Allegro Studio, New York	
ECM 1028	1973-06	Paul Motian	Conception Vessel	Recorded November 1972, Butterfly and Sound Ideas Studio, New York	
ECM 1029	1973-04	Jan Garbarek Trio	Triptykon	Recorded November 1972, Arne Bendiksen Studio, Oslo	
ECM 1030	1973-09	Gary Burton	The New Quartet	Recorded March 1973, Aengus Studios Fayville	
ECM 1031	1974-01	Terje Rypdal	What Comes After	Recorded August 1973, Arne Bendiksen Studio, Oslo	
ECM 1032	1974-11	Ralph Towner	Diary	Recorded April 1973, Tonstudio Bauer, Ludwigsburg	
ECM 1033/34	1974-04	Keith Jarrett	In the Light	Recorded 1973	
ECM 1035/37	1973-11	Keith Jarrett	Solo Concerts: Bremen/Lausanne	Recorded March 20, 1973, Lausanne / July 12, 1973, Bremen	
ECM 1038	1974-05	Art Lande / Jan Garbarek	Red Lanta	Recorded November 1973, Arne Bendiksen Studio, Oslo	
ECM 1039	1974-06	Dave Liebman	Lookout Farm	Recorded October 1973, Generation Sound Studios, New York	
ECM 1040	1974-08	Gary Burton Quartet	Seven Songs for Quartet and Chamber Orchestra	Recorded December 1973, Hamburg	
ECM 1041	1974-04	Jan Garbarek / Bobo Stenson Quartet	Witchi-Tai-To	Recorded November 1973, Arne Bendiksen Studio, Oslo	
ECM 1042	1974-04	Eberhard Weber	The Colours of Chloë	Recorded December 1973, Tonstudio Bauer, Ludwigsburg	
ECM 1043	1974-11	Bennie Maupin	The Jewel in the Lotus	Recorded march 1974, The Record Plant, New York	
ECM 1044	1974-03	Julian Priester Pepo Mtoto	Love, Love	Recorded June & September 1973, Different Fur Music, San Francisco	
ECM 1045	1974-11	Terje Rypdal	Whenever I Seem to Be Far Away	Recorded January August 1974, Oslo & Ludwigburg	
ECM 1046	1975-02	Dave Liebman	Drum Ode	Recorded May 1974, The Record Plant, New York	
ECM 1047	1975-01	John Abercrombie	Timeless	Recorded June 1974 Generation Sound Studio, New York	
ECM 1048	1975-03	Paul Motian	Tribute	Recorded May 1974, Generation Sound Studio, New York	
ECM 1049	1975-03	Keith Jarrett	Luminessence	Recorded April 1974, Tonstudio Bauer, Ludwigsburg	
ECM 1050	1974-10	Keith Jarrett / Jan Garbarek / Palle Danielsson / Jon Christensen	Belonging	Recorded April 1974, Arne Bendiksen Studio, Oslo	
ECM 1051	1974-12	The Gary Burton Quintet with Eberhard Weber	Ring	Recorded July 1974, Tonstudio Bauer, Ludwigsburg	
ECM 1052	1975-02	Steve Kuhn	Trance	Recorded November 11/12 1974, Generation Sound Studios, New York	
ECM 1053	1975-03	Michael Naura	Vanessa	Recorded septembre 1974, Windrose studios, Hambourg	
ECM 1054	1975-06	Richard Beirach	Eon	Recorded November 1974, Generation Sound Studios, New York	
ECM 1055	1975-04	Gary Burton / Steve Swallow	Hotel Hello	Recorded May 1974, Aengus Studios, Fayville	
ECM 1056	1975-04	Ralph Towner / Gary Burton	Matchbook	Recorded July 26/27, 1974, Tonstudio Bauer, Ludwigsburg	
ECM 1057	1975-05	Bill Connors	Theme to the Gaurdian	Recorded November 1974, Arne Bendiksen Studio, Oslo	
ECM 1058	1975-06	Steve Kuhn	Ecstasy	Recorded November 1974, Arne Bendiksen Studio, Oslo	
ECM 1059	1975-05	Arild Andersen	Clouds in My Head	Recorded February 1975, Arne Bendiksen Studio, Oslo	
ECM 1060	1975-09	Ralph Towner	Solstice	Recorded December 1974, Arne Bendiksen Studio, Oslo	
ECM 1061	1976-10	John Abercrombie / Dave Holland / Jack DeJohnette	Gateway	Recorded March 1975, Tonstudio Bauer, Ludwigsburg	
ECM 1062	1976-01	Collin Walcott	Cloud Dance	Recorded March 1975, Tonstudio Bauer, Ludwigsburg	
ECM 1063	1975-11	Enrico Rava	The Pilgrim and the Stars	Recorded June 1975, Tonstudio Bauer, Ludwigsburg	
ECM 1064/65	1975-11	Keith Jarrett	The Köln Concert	January 24, 1975, Köln Opéra	
ECM 1066	1976-01	Eberhard Weber	Yellow Fields	September 1975, Tonstudio Bauer, Ludwigsburg	
ECM 1067/68	1975-10	Terje Rypdal	Odyssey	August 1975, Arne Bendiksen Studio, Oslo	
ECM 1069	1976-02	Kenny Wheeler	Gnu High	June 1975, Generation Sounds Studio, Nem York	
ECM 1070	1976-05	Keith Jarrett	Arbour Zena	Recorded October 1975, Tonstudio Bauer, Ludwigsburg	
ECM 1071	1976-04	Tomasz Stańko	Balladyna	Recorded december 1975, Tonstudio Bauer, Ludwigsburg	
ECM 1072	1976-06	Gary Burton Quintet	Dreams So Real	December 1975, Tonstudio Bauer, Ludwigsburg	
ECM 1073	1976-03	Pat Metheny	Bright Size Life	December 1975, Tonstudio Bauer, Ludwigsburg	
ECM 1074	1976-09	Jack DeJohnette's Directions	Untitled	Recorded February 1976, Talent Studios, Oslo	
ECM 1075	1976-03	Jan Garbarek / Bobo Stenson Quartet	Dansere	Recorded November 1975, Talent Studios, Oslo	
ECM 1076 ST	1976-09	Barre Phillips	Mountainscapes	1976-03	Recorded March 1976, Tonstudio Bauer, Ludwigsburg
ECM 1077	1976-06	Edward Vesala	Nan Madol	Recorded April 1974, Alppi Studio, Helsinki	
ECM 1078	1977-03	Enrico Rava	The Plot	Recorded August 1976, Talent Studio, Oslo	
ECM 1079	1977-02	Jack DeJohnette	Pictures	Recorded February 1976, talent Studio, Oslo	
ECM 1080	1976-10	Ralph Towner / John Abercrombie	Sargasso Sea	Recorded May 1976, Talent Studio, Oslo	
ECM 1081 ST	1976-10	Art Lande	Rubisa Patrol	Recorded May 1976, Talent Studio, Oslo	
ECM 1082 ST	1977-02	Arild Andersen	Shimri	Recorded October 1976, Talent Studio, Oslo	
ECM 1083	1976-10	Terje Rypdal	After the Rain	Recorded August 1976, Talent Studio, Oslo	
ECM 1084	1977-01	Eberhard Weber	The Following Morning	Recorded August 1976, Talent Studio, Oslo	
ECM 1085	1977-01	Keith Jarrett	The Survivors' Suite	Recorded February 1976, Talent Studio, Oslo	
ECM 1086/87	1976-11	Keith Jarrett	Hymns/Spheres	Recorded September 1976, Ottobeuren Abbey	
ECM 1088 ST	1977-01	Edward Vesala	Satu	Recorded October 1976, Talent Studio, Oslo	
ECM 1089 ST	1977-03	Egberto Gismonti	Dança das cabeças	Recorded November 1976, Talent Studio, Oslo	
ECM 1090/91 ST	1977-05	Keith Jarrett	Staircase	Recorded May 1976, Studio Davout, Paris	
ECM 1092 ST	1977-04	The Gary Burton Quartet with Eberhard Weber	Passengers	Recorded November 1976, Talent Studio, Oslo	
ECM 1093 ST	1977-05	Jan Garbarek	Dis	Recorded December 1976, Talent Studio, Oslo	
ECM 1094 ST	1977-04	Steve Kuhn and Ecstasy	Motility	Recorded January 1977, Tonstudio Bauer, Ludwigsburg	
ECM 1095 ST	1977-10	Ralph Towner / Solstice	Sound and Shadows	Recorded February 1977, Talent Studio, Oslo	
ECM 1096 ST	1977-09	Collin Walcott	Grazing Dreams	Recorded February 1977, Talent Studio, Oslo	
ECM 1097 ST	1977-05	Pat Metheny	Watercolors	Recorded February 1977, Talent Studio, Oslo	
ECM 1098 ST	1977-05	Julian Priester and Marine Intrusion	Polarization	Recorded January 1977, Tonstudio Bauer, Ludwigsburg	
ECM 1099 ST	1977-09	Azimuth	Azimuth	Recorded March 1977, Talent Studio, Oslo	Azimuth consists of John Taylor, Norma Winstone & Kenny Wheeler

=== ECM 11xx – ===
Catalog number	Year	Artist	Title	Notes
ECM 1100	1978-01	Keith Jarrett	Sun Bear Concerts	live; 10×LP boxset
ECM 1101	1977-09	Gary Peacock	Tales of Another	Recorded February 1977, Generation sound Studios, New York
ECM 1102	1978-01	Kenny Wheeler	Deer Wan	Recorded July 1977, Talent Studio, Oslo
ECM 1103	1977-09	Jack DeJohnette's Directions	New Rags	Recorded May 1977, Tonstudio Bauer, Ludwigsburg
ECM 1104	1978-01	Richard Beirach	Hubris	Recorded June 1977, Tonstudio Bauer, Ludwigsburg
ECM 1105	1978-03	John Abercrombie / Dave Holland / Jack DeJohnette	Gateway 2	Recorded July 1977, Talent Studio, Oslo
ECM 1106	1978-06	Art Lande and Rubisa Patrol	Desert Marauders	Recorded June 1977, Tonstudio Bauer, Ludwigsburg
ECM 1107	1978-03	Eberhard Weber / Colours	Silent Feet	REcorded November 1977, Tonstudio Bauer, Ludwigsburg
ECM 1108	1978-01	Paul Motian Trio	Dance	Recorded September 1977, Tonstudio Bauer, Ludwigsburg
ECM 1109	1978-05	Dave Holland	Emerald Tears	Recorded August 1977, Talent Studio, Oslo
ECM 1110	1978-01	Terje Rypdal	Waves	Recorded September 1977, Talent studio, Oslo
ECM 1111	1978-11	Gary Burton	Times Square	Recorded January 1978, Generation Sound Studios, New York
ECM 1112	1982-02	Keith Jarrett	Ritual	Recorded June 1977, Tonstudio Bauer, Ludwigsburg
ECM 1113	1978-01	Tom Van Der Geld and Children at Play	Patience	Recorded May 1977, Tonstudio Bauer, Ludwigsburg
ECM 1114	1978-03	Pat Metheny Group	Pat Metheny Group	Recorded January 1978, Talent Studio, Oslo
ECM 1115	1978-06	Keith Jarrett	My Song	Recorded November 1977, Talent Studio, Oslo
ECM 1116	1978-05	Egberto Gismonti	Sol do meio dia	Recorded November 1977, Talent Studio, Oslo
ECM 1117	1978-05	John Abercrombie	Characters	Recorded November 1977, Talent Sudio, Oslo
ECM 1118	1978-09	Jan Garbarek	Places	Recorded December 1977, Talent Studio, Oslo
ECM 1119	1979-01	Gary Peacock	December Poems	Recorded December 1977, Talent Studio, Oslo
ECM 1120	1978-05	Bill Connors	Of Mist and Melting	Recorded December 1977, Talent Studio, Oslo
ECM 1121	1978-09	Ralph Towner	Batik	Recorded January 1978, Talent Studio, Oslo
ECM 1122	1978-10	Enrico Rava Quartet	Enrico Rava Quartet	Recorded March 1978, Tonstudio Bauer, Ludwigsburg
ECM 1123	1978-10	Barre Phillips	Three Day Moon	Recorded March 1978, Talent Studio, Oslo
ECM 1124	1978-10	Steve Kuhn	Non-Fiction	Recorded april 1978, Tonstudio Bauer, Ludwigsburg
ECM 1125	1979-01	Terje Rypdal / Miroslav Vitouš / Jack DeJohnette	Terje Rypdal / Miroslav Vitous / Jack DeJohnette	Recorded June 1978, Talent Studio, Oslo
ECM 1126	1979-01	Art Ensemble of Chicago	Nice Guys	Recorded May 1978, Tonstudio Bauer, Ludwigsburg
ECM 1127	1978-11	Arild Andersen Quartet	Green Shading into Blue	Recorded April 1978, Talent Studio, Oslo
ECM 1128	1979-04	Jack DeJohnette	New Directions	Recorded June 1978, Talent Studio, Oslo
ECM 1129	1978-04	Steve Reich	Music for 18 Musicians	ECM New Series Recorded April-december 1976, New York
ECM 1130	1978-10	Azimuth	The Touchstone	Recorded June 1978, Talent Studio, Oslo
ECM 1131	1979-03	Pat Metheny	New Chautauqua	Recorded August 1978, Talent Studio, Oslo
ECM 1132	1979-04	Collin Walcott / Don Cherry / Naná Vasconcelos	Codona	Recorded September 1978, Tonstudio Bauer, Ludwigsburg
ECM 1133	1979-03	John Abercrombie Quartet	Arcade	Recorded December 1978, Talent Studio, Oslo
ECM 1134	1979-05	Tom Van Der Geld	Path	Recorded February 1979, Tonstudio Bauer, Ludwigsburg
ECM 1135	1979-05	Jan Garbarek Group	Photo with Blue Sky, White Cloud, Wires, Windows and a Red Roof	Recorded December 1978, Talent Studio, Oslo
ECM 1136	1979-04	Egberto Gismonti	Solo	Recorded November 1978, Talent Studio, Oslo
ECM 1137	1979-05	Eberhard Weber	Fluid Rustle	Recorded January 1979, Tonstudio Bauer, Ludwigsburg
ECM 1138	1979-09	Paul Motian Trio	Le voyage	Recorded March 1979, Tonstudio Bauer, Ludwigsburg
ECM 1139	1979-05	Mick Goodrick	In Pas(s)ing	Recorded November 1978, Talent Studio, Oslo
ECM 1140	1979-05	Gary Burton / Chick Corea	Duet	Recorded October 1978, Delphian Foundation, Sheridan
ECM 1141	1979-09	George Adams	Sound Suggestions	Recorded May 1979, Tonstudio Bauer, Ludwigsburg
ECM 1142	1979-09	Richard Beirach	Elm	Recorded May 1979, Tonstudio Bauer, Ludwigsburg
ECM 1143	1979-04	Leo Smith	Divine Love	Recorded September 1978, Tonstudio Bauer, Ludwigsburg
ECM 1144	1980-01	Terje Rypdal	Descendre	Recorded March 1979, Talent Studio, Oslo
ECM 1145	1980-01	Miroslav Vitouš	First Meeting	Recorded May 1979, Talent Studio, Oslo
ECM 1146	1979-01	Double Image	Dawn	Recorded October 1978, Talent Studio, Oslo
ECM 1147	1980-01	Nana Vasconcelos	Saudades	Recorded March 1979, Tonstudio Bauer, Ludwigsburg
ECM 1148	1979-11	John Surman	Upon Reflection	Recorded May 1979, Talent studio, Oslo
ECM 1149	1980-03	Barre Phillips	Journal Violone II	Recorded June 1979, Tonstudio Bauer, Ludwigsburg
ECM 1150	1979-05	Keith Jarrett	Eyes of the Heart	Recorded May 1976, Theater am Kornmarkt, Bregenz
ECM 1151	1980-01	Charlie Haden / Jan Garbarek / Egberto Gismonti	Mágico	Recorded June 1979, Talent Studio, Oslo
ECM 1152	1980-01	Jack DeJohnette	Special Edition	Recorded March 1979, Generation Sound Studios, New York
ECM 1153	1979-11	Ralph Towner	Old Friends, New Friends	Recorded July 1979, Talent Studio, Oslo
ECM 1154	1979-11	Old and New Dreams	Old and New Dreams	Recorded August 1979, Talent Studio, Oslo
ECM 1155	1979-11	Pat Metheny Group	American Garage	Recorded June 1979, Longview Farm, No. Brookfields
ECM 1156	1980-06	Kenny Wheeler	Around 6	Recorded auguste 1979, Tonstudio Bauer, Ludwigsburg
ECM 1157	1980-09	Jack DeJohnette	New Directions in Europe	Recorded June 1979, Willisau
ECM 1158	1980-03	Bill Connors	Swimming with a Hole in My Body	Recorded August 1979, Talent studio, Oslo
ECM 1159	1980-03	Steve Kuhn / Sheila Jordan Band	Playground	Recorded July 1979, Columbia Recording Studios, New York
ECM 1160	1980-11	Steve Swallow	Home	Recorded September 1979, Columbia Recording Studios, New York
ECM 1161	1980-05	David Darling	Journal October	Recorded October 1979, Tonstudio Bauer, Ludwigsburg
ECM 1162	1980-06	Sam Rivers	Contrasts	Recorded December 1979, Tonstudio Bauer, Ludwigsburg
ECM 1163	1980-10	Azimuth with Ralph Towner	Départ	Recorded December 1979, Talent Sudio, Oslo
ECM 1164	1980-03	John Abercrombie Quartet	Abercrombie Quartet	Recorded November 1979, Talent Studio, Oslo
ECM 1165	1981-02	Gary Peacock	Shift in the Wind	Recorded February 1980, Columbia Recording Studios, Naw York
ECM 1166	1980-09	Enrico Rava Quartet	>>AH<<	Recorded December 1979, Tonstudio Bauer, Ludwigsburg
ECM 1167	1980-04	Art Ensemble of Chicago	Full Force	Recorded January 1980, Columbia Recording Studios, New York
ECM 1168	1980-09	Steve Reich	Octet / Music for a Large Ensemble / Violin Phase	ECM New Series recorded February & March 1980
ECM 1169	1980-09	Jan Garbarek / Kjell Johnsen	Aftenland	Recorded December 1979, Engelbrektskyrkan, Stockholm
ECM 1170	1981-02	Charlie Haden / Jan Garbarek / Egberto Gismonti	Folk Songs	Recorded November 1979, Talent Studio, Oslo
ECM 1171/72	1980-03	Keith Jarrett	Nude Ants	Recorded May 1979, Village Vanguard, New York
ECM 1173	1980-10	Ralph Towner	Solo Concert	Recorded October 1979, Amerika Haus, Münchenand Limmathaus, Zürich
ECM 1174	1980-09	Keith Jarrett	G.I. Gurdjieff: Sacred Hymns	Recorded March 1980, Tonstudio Bauer, Ludwigsburg
ECM 1175	1980-11	Keith Jarrett	The Celestial Hawk	Recorded March 1980, Carnegie Hall, New York
ECM 1176	1981-03	John Clark	Faces	Recorded April 1980, Talent Studio, Oslo
ECM 1177	1981-02	Codona	Codona 2	Recorded May 1980, Tonstudio Bauer, Ludwigsburg
ECM 1178	1981-03	Barre Phillips	Music by...	Recorded May 1980, Tonstudio Bauer, Ludwigsburg
ECM 1179	1982-01	Bengt Berger	Bitter Funeral Beer	Recorded January 1981, Decibel Studios, Stockholm
ECM 1180/81	1980-09	Pat Metheny	80/81	Recorded May 1980, Talent Studio, Oslo
ECM 1182/83	1980-10	Chick Corea / Gary Burton	In Concert, Zürich, October 28, 1979	Recorded live October 1979, Limmathaus, Zürich
ECM 1184	1981-03	Gary Burton Quartet	Easy as Pie	Recorded June 1980, Tonstudio Bauer, Ludwigsburg
ECM 1185	1981-02	Miroslav Vitouš Group	Miroslav Vitous Group	Recorded July 1980, Talent Studio, Oslo
ECM 1186	1980-10	Eberhard Weber & Colours	Little Movements	Recorded July 980, Tonstudio Bauer, Ludwigsburg
ECM 1187	1981-03	Rainer Brüninghaus	Freigeweht	Recorded July–August 1980, Talent Studio, Oslo
ECM 1188	1981-03	Arild Andersen	Lifelines	Recorded July 1980, Talent Studio, Oslo
ECM 1189	1981-04	Jack DeJohnette's Special Edition	Tin Can Alley	Recorded September 1980, Tonstudio Bauer, Ludwigsburg
ECM 1190	1981-04	Pat Metheny & Lyle Mays	As Falls Wichita, So Falls Wichita Falls	Recorded September–October 1980, Talent Studio, Oslo
ECM 1191	1981-04	Abercrombie Quartet	M	Recorded November 1980, Tonstudio Bauer, Ludwigsburg
ECM 1192	1981-09	Terje Rypdal / Miroslav Vitouš / Jack DeJohnette	To Be Continued	Recorded January 1981, Talent Studio, Oslo
ECM 1193	1981-10	John Surman	The Amazing Adventures of Simon Simon	Recorded January 1981, Talent Studio, Oslo
ECM 1194	1981-06	First Avenue	First Avenue	Recorded November 1980, Tonstudio Bauer, Ludwigsburg
ECM 1195	1981-05	Shankar	Who's to Know	Recorded November 1980, Tonstudio Bauer, Ludwigsburg
ECM 1196	1981-06	Thomas Demenga, Heinz Reber	Cellorganics	ECM New Series recorded October 1980, Pauluskirche Bern
ECM 1197	1981-06	Meredith Monk	Dolmen Music	ECM New Series recorded March 1980 & January 1981, Tonstudio Bauer, Ludwigsburg
ECM 1198	1981-09	Steve Eliovson	Dawn Dance	Recorded January 1981, Tonstudio Bauer, Ludwigsburg
ECM 1199	1981-09	Katrina Krimsky / Trevor Watts	Stella Malu	Recorded March 1981, Tonstudio Bauer, Ludwigsburg

=== ECM 12xx – ===
Catalog number	Year	Artist	Title	Notes
ECM 120-090	1981	Jan Garbarek / John Abercrombie / Nana Vasconcelos	Eventyr	Recorded December 1980, Talent Studio, Oslo
ECM 1201/02	1981-05	Keith Jarrett	Invocations/The Moth and the Flame	Recorded November 1979 & October 1980, Tonstudio Bauer, Ludwigsburg & Ottobeuren Abbey
ECM 1203/04	1981-10	Egberto Gismonti & Academia de danças	Sanfona	Recorded November 1980 & April 1981, Talent Studio Oslo & Amerika Haus, München
ECM 1205	1981-09	Old and New Dreams	Playing	Recorded June 1980, Theater am Kornmarkt, Bregenz
ECM 1206	1981-10	Gallery	Gallery	Recorded May 1981, Sound Ideas Studio, New York
ECM 1207	1982-02	Ralph Towner / John Abercrombie	Five Years Later	Recorded March 1981, Talent Studio, Oslo
ECM 1208	1982-02	Art Lande / David Samuels / Paul McCandless	Skylight	recorded May 1981, Tonstudio Bauer, Ludwigsburg
ECM 1209	1982-02	Lester Bowie	The Great Pretender	Recorded June 1981, Tonstudio Bauer, Ludwigsburg
ECM 1210	1982-04	Gary Peacock	Voice from the Past – Paradigm	recorded August 1981, Talent Studio, Oslo
ECM 1211/12	1982-03	Art Ensemble of Chicago	Urban Bushmen	Recorded May 1980, Amerika Haus, München
ECM 1213	1982-03	Steve Kuhn Quartet	Last Year's Waltz	Recorded April 1981, Fat Tuesday's, New York City
ECM 1214	1982-02	James Newton	Axum	Recorded August 1981, Tonstudio Bauer, Ludwigsburg
ECM 1215	1982-09	Steve Reich	Tehillim	New Series recorded September–October 1981, Tonstudio Bauer, Ludwigsburg
ECM 1216	1982-05	Pat Metheny Group	Offramp	Recorded October 1981, Power Station, New York
ECM 1217	1982-03	Lask	Lask	Recorded November 1981, Tonstudio Bauer, Ludwigsburg
ECM 1218	1982-03	Steve Tibbetts	Northern Song	Recorded October 1981, Talent Studio, Oslo
ECM 1219	1982-06	David Darling	Cycles	Recorded November 1981, Talent Studio, Oslo
ECM 1220	1982-04	Mike Nock	Ondas	Recorded November 1981, Talent Studio, Oslo
ECM 1221	1982-04	Adelhard Roidinger	Schattseite	Recorded November 1981, Tonstudio Bauer, Ludwigsburg
ECM 1222	1982-06	Paul Motian Band	Psalm	Recorded December 1981, Tonstudio Bauer, Ludwigsburg
ECM 1223	1982-09	Jan Garbarek	Paths, Prints	Recorded December 1981, Talent Studio, Oslo
ECM 1224	1982-06	Enrico Rava Quartet	Opening Night	Recorded December 1981, Tonstudio Bauer, Ludwigsburg
ECM 1225	1982-11	Dewey Redman	The Struggle Continues	Recorded January 1982, Columbia Recording Studios, New York
ECM 1226	1982-11	Gary Burton Quartet	Picture This	Recorded January 1982, Columbia Recording Studios, New York
ECM 1227–29	1982-09	Keith Jarrett	Concerts	Recorded May 28, 1981, Festspielhaus Bregenz (Austria) & June 2, 1981, Herkulessaal München (Germany)
ECM 1230	1982-10	Don Cherry / Ed Blackwell	El Corazón	recorded February 1982, Tonstudio Bauer, Ludwigsburg
ECM 1231	1982-10	Eberhard Weber	Later That Evening	Recorded March 1982, Tonstudio Bauer, Ludwigsburg
ECM 1232/33	1982-10	Chick Corea	Trio Music	Recorded November 1981, Mad Hatter Studio, Los Angeles
ECM 1234	1982-09	Everyman Band	Everyman Band	Recorded March 1982, Talent Studio, Oslo
ECM 1235	1982-09	Hajo Weber / Ulrich Ingenbold	Winterreise	Recorded March 1982, Tonstudio Bauer, Ludwigsburg
ECM 1236	1982-10	Arild Andersen	A Molde Concert	Recorded August 1981, Molde Jazz Festival
ECM 1237	1983-04	Werner Pirchner / Harry Pepl / Jack DeJohnette	Werner Pirchner / Harry Pepl / Jack DeJohnette	Recorded on a Sunday afternoon in June 1982 at Tonstudio Bauer, Ludwigsburg
ECM 1238	1983-03	Dave Holland	Life Cycle	Recprded November 1982, Tonstudio Bauer, Ludwigsburg
ECM 1239	1983-04	Denny Zeitlin / Charlie Haden	Time Remembers One Time Once	Recorded July 1981, Keystone Korner, San Francisco
ECM 1240	1983-09	Meredith Monk	Turtle Dreams	ECM New Series recorded June/July 1982 & January 1983 in New York and Ludwigsburg
ECM 1241	1983-04	Bill Frisell	In Line	Recorded August 1982, Talent Studio, Oslo
ECM 1242	1983-04	Miroslav Vitous	Journey's End	Recorded July 1982, Talent Studio, Oslo
ECM 1243	1983-02	Collin Walcott / Don Cherry / Nana Vasconcelos	Codona 3	Recorded September 1982, Tonstudio Bauer, Ludwigsburg
ECM 1244	1983-05	Jack DeJohnette's Special Edition	Inflation Blues	recorded September 1982, Power Station, New York
ECM 1245	1983-04	Michael Galasso	Scenes	Recorded October 1982, Tonstudio Bauer, Ludwigsburg
ECM 1246/47	1983-04	Lester Bowie	All the Magic!	Recorded June 1982, Tonstudio Bauer, Ludwigsburg
ECM 1248	1983-10	Charlie Haden	The Ballad of the Fallen	Recorded November 1982, Tonstudio Bauer, Luswigsburg
ECM 1249	1983-01	Harald Weiss	Trommelgeflüster	ECM New Series recorded September 1982, Tonstudio Bauer, Ludwigsburg
ECM 1250	1983-04	Ralph Towner	Blue Sun	Recorded November-December 1982, Talent Studio, Oslo
ECM 1251	1983-09	Dino Saluzzi	Kultrum	Recorded November 1982, Tonstudio Bauer, Ludwigsburg
ECM 1252/53	1983-05	Pat Metheny Group	Travels	Recorded July-November 1982, Dallas/Philadelphia/Hartford/Sacramento/Nacogdoches
ECM 1254	1983-09	John Surman	Such Winters of Memory	Recorded December 1982, Talent Studio, Oslo
ECM 1255	1983-09	Keith Jarrett / Gary Peacock / Jack DeJohnette	Standards, Vol. 1	Recorded January 1983, Power Station, New York
ECM 1256	1983-11	Charlie Mariano & The Karnataka College of Percussion	Jyothi	Recorded February 1983, Tonstudio Bauer, Ludwigsburg
ECM 1257	1984-01	Barre Phillips	Call Me When You Get There	Recorded February 1983, Tonstudio Bauer, Ludwigsburg
ECM 1258	1983-10	Oregon	Oregon	Recorded March 1983, Tonstudio Bauer, Ludwigsburg
ECM 1259	1983-09	Jan Garbarek Group	Wayfarer	Recorded MArch 1983, Talent Studio, Oslo
ECM 1260	1983-09	Chick Corea / Gary Burton	Lyric Suite for Sextet	Recorded September 1982, Mad Hatters Studio, Los Angeles
ECM 1261	1984-03	Shankar	Vision	Recorded April 1983, Talent Studio, Oslo
ECM 1262	1984-01	Kenny Wheeler	Double, Double You	Recorded May 1983, Power Station, New York
ECM 1263	1984-01	Terje Rypdal / David Darling	Eos	Recorded May 1983, Talent Studio, Oslo
ECM 1264	1984-03	Alfred Harth	This Earth!	Recorded May 1983, onstudio Bauer, Ludwigsburg
ECM 1265	1984-04	George Gruntz Concert Jazz Band '83	Theatre	Recorded July 1983, Tonstudio Bauer, Ludwigsburg
ECM 1266	1984-03	Rainer Brüninghaus	Continuum	Recorded September 1983, talent Studio, Oslo
ECM 1267	1984-04	Chick Corea	Children's Songs	Recorded July 1983, Tonstudio Bauer, Ludwigsburg
ECM 1268	1984-04	Lask 2	Sucht + Ordnung	Recorded January 1984, Tonstudio Bauer, Ludwigsburg
ECM 1269	1984-04	Dave Holland Quintet	Jumpin' In	Recorded October 1983, Tonstudio Bauer, Ludwigsburg
ECM 1270	1984-04	Steve Tibbetts	Safe Journey	Recorded Recorded November 1983, St Paul Minnesota
ECM 1271	1984-04	Pat Metheny	Rejoicing	Recorded November 1983, Power Station, New York
ECM 1272	1984-09	John Abercrombie	Night	Recorded April 1984, Power Station, New York
ECM 1273	1985-01	Art Ensemble of Chicago	The Third Decade	Recorded June 1984, Tonstudio Bauer, Ludwigsburg
ECM 1274	1984-11	Pierre Favre Ensemble	Singing Drums	Recorded May 1984, Mohren, Willisau
ECM 1275	1984-09	Gidon Kremer, Keith Jarrett	Arvo Pärt: Tabula Rasa	ECM New Series recorded October 1983 (Basel), January 1984 (Stuttgart), February 1984 (Berlin), November 1977 (Bonn)
ECM 1276	1984-09	Keith Jarrett	Changes	Recorded January 1983, Power Station, New York
ECM 1277	1984-09	John Adams	Harmonium	ECM New Series recorded January 1984, Davies Symphony Hall,San Francisco
ECM 1278	1984-10	Pat Metheny Group	First Circle	Recorded February 1984, Power Station, New York
ECM 1279	1985-03	Egberto Gismonti / Nana Vasconcelos	Duas Vozes	Recorded June 1984, Talent Studio, Oslo
ECM 1280	1984-09	Jack DeJohnette's Special Edition	Album Album	Recorded June 1984, Power Station, New York
ECM 1281	1985-03	Michael Fahres	Piano. Harfe	ECM New Series recorded August 1982, Tonstudio Bauer, Ludwigsburg
ECM 1282	1985-03	Chick Corea	Voyage	Recorded July 1984, Tonstudio Bauer, Ludwigsburg
ECM 1283	1985-03	Paul Motian Trio	It Should've Happened a Long Time Ago	Recorded July 1984, Tonstudio Bauer, Ludwigsburg
ECM 1284	1982-03	David Torn	Best Laid Plans	Recorded July 1984, Rainbow Studio, Oslo
ECM 1285	1984-09	Bruno Ganz	Hölderlin Gedichte	ECM New Series recorded March 1984, Berlin
ECM 1286	1985-02	Shankar	Song for Everyone	Recorded September 1984, Rainbow Studio
ECM 1287	1985-04	Bill Frisell	Rambler	Recorded August 1984, Power Station, New York
ECM 1288	1985-03	Eberhard Weber	Chorus	Recorded September 1984, Tonstudio Bauer, Ludwigsburg
ECM 1289	1985-04	Keith Jarrett / Gary Peacock / Jack DeJohnette	Standards, Vol. 2	Recorded January 1983, Power station, new York
ECM 1290	1985-06	Everyman Band	Without Warning	Recorded December 1984, Bearsville Studios, New York
ECM 1291	1985-06	Oregon	Crossing	Recorded October 1984, Tonstudio Bauer, Luswigsburg
ECM 1292	1985-06	David Holland Quintet	Seeds of Time	Recorded November 1984, Tonstudio Bauer, Ludwigsburg
ECM 1293	1985-03	Gary Burton Quartet	Real Life Hits	Recorded November 1984, Tonstudio Bauer, Ludwigsburg
ECM 1294	1985-09	Jan Garbarek Group	It's OK to Listen to the Gray Voice	Recorded december 1984, Rainbow Studio, Oslo
ECM 1295	1985-04	John Surman	Withholding Pattern	Recorded December 1984, Rainbow Studio, Oslo
ECM 1296	1985-09	Lester Bowie's Brass Fantasy	I Only Have Eyes for You	Recorded February 1985, Rawlson recording studio, New York
ECM 1297	1985-11	Chick Corea	Septet	Recorded October 1984, Mad Hatters Studios, Los Angeles
ECM 1298	1985-09	Azimuth	Azimuth '85	Recorded March 1985, Rainbow Studio, Oslo
ECM 1299	1986-01	Marc Johnson	Bass Desires	Recorded May 1985, Power Station, New York

=== ECM 13xx – ===
Catalog number	Year	Artist	Title	Notes
ECM 1300	N/A	N/A	N/A	unissued
ECM 1301	N/A	N/A	N/A	unissued
ECM 1302	1985	Keith Jarrett	Spheres	compilation
ECM 1303	1985-09	Terje Rypdal	Chaser	Recorded May 1985, Rainbow Studio, Oslo
ECM 1304/05	1985-09	Gidon Kremer	Edition Lockenhaus, Vol. 1 & 2	ECM New Series recorded 1981-1984, Lockenhaus
ECM 1306	1986-01	Ralph Towner / Gary Burton	Slide Show	Recorded May 1985, Tonstudio Bauer, Ludwigsburg
ECM 1307	1986-03	First House	Eréndira	Recorded July 1985, Rainbow Studio, Oslo
ECM 1308	1986-01	Shankar / Caroline	The Epidemics	Recorded February 1985, Stickwork Studios, New York
ECM 1309	1986-03	Dino Saluzzi	Once Upon a Time – Far Away in the South	Recorded July 1985, Tonstudio Bauer, Ludwigsburg
ECM 1310	1986-10	Chick Corea	Trio Music Live in Europe	Recorded live september 1984, Willisau & Reutlingen
ECM 1311	1986-04	John Abercrombie	Current Events	Recorded september 1985, Rainbow Studio, Oslo
ECM 1312	1986-10	Miroslav Vitous	Emergence	Recorded october 1985, Tonstudio Bauer, Ludwigsburg
ECM 1313	N/A	Unissued	Unissued	
ECM 1314/15	1986-06	Werner Pirchner	EU	ECM New Series recorded 1984-1986, Tonstudio Ströher, Innsbruck, Vienna, Tirol, Lend
ECM 1316	1986-02	Kim Kashkashian / Robert Levin	Elegies	ECM New Series recorded 1984, Elite Recordings, New York
ECM 1317	1986-01	Keith Jarrett / Gary Peacock / Jack DeJohnette	Standards Live	recorded live July 1985, Palais des Congrès, Studio de la Grande Armée, Paris
ECM 1318	1986-05	Stephan Micus	Ocean	Recorded January 1986, Tonstudio Bauer, Ludwigsburg
ECM 1319	1986-03	Masqualero	Bande à Part	Recorded August & December 1985, Rainbow Studio, Oslo
ECM 1320	1986-10	Paul Bley	Fragments	Recorded January 1986, Rainbow Studio, Oslo
ECM 1321	1988-02	John Abercrombie	Getting There	Recorded April 1987, Power Station, New York
ECM 1322	1987-02	David Torn	Cloud About Mercury	Recorded MArch 1986, Audio International, London
ECM 1323	1986-09	Gavin Bryars	Three Viennese Dancers	ECM New Series recorded February 1986, Tonstudio Bauer, Ludwigsburg
ECM 1324	1987-02	Jan Garbarek	All Those Born with Wings	recorded August 1986, Rainbow Studio, Oslo
ECM 1325	1987-05	Hilliard Ensemble, Arvo Pärt	Pärt: Arbos	ECM New Series recorded March/August 1986, Karlsröhe, Ludwigsburg & January 1987, St. John's Church, London
ECM 1326	1986	Lester Bowie's Brass Fantasy	Avant Pop	Recorded March 1986, Tonstudio Bauer, Ludwigsburg
ECM 1327	1986	Jon Hassell	Power Spot	Recorded December 1984 and October 1983, Grant Avenue Studio, Hamilton Ontario, Canada
ECM 1328	1986	Valery Afanassiev	Franz Schubert: Sonata in B flat, D. 960	ECM New Series
ECM 1329	1987-02	Gary Burton Quintet	Whiz Kids	Recorded June 1986, Tonstudio Bauer, Ludwigsburg
ECM 1330–32	1988-04	Kim Kashkashian, Robert Levin	Paul Hindemith: Sonatas for Viola/Piano and Viola Alone	ECM New Series recorded 1985-1986, Kirche Seon, Switzerland & Karlshöhe, Ludwigsburg.
ECM 1333/34	1986-09	Keith Jarrett	Spirits	Recorded May through July 1985, Cavelight Studios, New Jersey.
ECM 1335	1986-09	Steve Tibbetts	Exploded View	Recorded 1985-86, St. Paul, Minnesota.
ECM 1336	1987-05	Meredith Monk	Do You Be	ECM New Series recorded June 86 and january 87, Tonstudio Bauer, Ludwigsburg & Clinton Sounds, New York.
ECM 1337	1987-02	Norma Winstone	Somewhere Called Home	Recorded July 1986; rainbow Studio, Oslo.
ECM 1338	1987-05	Mark Isham / Art Lande	We Begin	Recorded January 1987, Rainbow Studio, Oslo.
ECM 1339	1987-05	Edward Vesala	Lumi	recorded June 1986, Finnvox Studios, Helsinki.
ECM 1340	1987-11	Thomas Demenga, Heinz Holliger, Catrin Demenga	Holliger: Duo, Studie, Trema / Bach: Suite No. 4 for Solo Cello	ECM New Series recorded September 1986, Kirche Blumenstein, Switzerland.
ECM 1341	1987-11	The Hilliard Ensemble	Thomas Tallis: The Lamentations of Jeremiah	ECM New Series recorded September 1986, All Hallows Church, Lonndon.
ECM 1342	1987-05	Christy Doran	Red Twist & Tuned Arrow	Recorded November 1986, soundville Recording Studios, Luzern.
ECM 1343	1987-10	Enrico Rava / Dino Saluzzi	Volver	Recorded October 1986, Tonstudio Bauer, Ludwigsburg.
ECM 1344/45	1987-09	Keith Jarrett	Book of Ways	Recorded July 1986, Tonstudio Bauer, Ludwigsburg.
ECM 1346	1987-05	Terje Rypdal & The Chasers	Blue	Recorded November 1986, Rainbow Studio, Oslo.
ECM 1347/48	1988-02	Gidon Kremer	Edition Lockenhaus Vols. 4 & 5	ECM New Series recorded Lockenhaus Festival 1985 & 1986.
ECM 1349	1987-05	Zakir Hussain	Making Music	Recorded December 1986, Rainbow Studio, Oslo.
ECM 1350	1988-02	Bill Frisell Band	Lookout for Hope	Recorded March 1987, Power Station, New York.
ECM 1351	1987	Marc Johnson's Bass Desires	Second Sight	
ECM 1352	1987	Gary Peacock	Guamba	
ECM 1353	1987	Dave Holland Quintet	The Razor's Edge	
ECM 1354	1987	Oregon	Ecotopia	
ECM 1355	1988	Steve Tibbetts	Yr	
ECM 1356	1988	Herbert Joos / Harry Pepl / Jon Christensen	Cracked Mirrors	
ECM 1357	1988	Hans Koch / Martin Schütz / Marco Kappeli	Accélération	
ECM 1358	1988	Stephan Micus	Twilight Fields	
ECM 1359		Rabih Abou-Khalil	Nafas	
ECM 1360/61	1988	Keith Jarrett / Gary Peacock / Jack DeJohnette	Still Live	
ECM 1362/63	1988	Keith Jarrett	J.S. Bach: Das Wohltemperierte Klavier, Buch I	ECM New Series
ECM 1364	1988	Tamia – Pierre Favre	de la nuit ... le jour	ECM New Series
ECM 1365	1988	The Paul Bley Quartet	The Paul Bley Quartet	
ECM 1366	1987	John Surman	Private City	
ECM 1367	1988	Masqualero	Aero	
ECM 1368	1989	Paul Hillier, Stephen Stubbs, Andrew Lawrence-King, Erin Headley	Proensa	ECM New Series
ECM 1369	1988	Heiner Goebbels / Heiner Müller	Der Mann im Fahrstuhl / The Man in the Elevator	
ECM 1370	1988	The Hilliard Ensemble	Arvo Pärt: Passio	ECM New Series
ECM 1371	1989	Markus Stockhausen / Gary Peacock	Cosi Lontano ... Quasi Dentro	
ECM 1372	1989	Alex Cline	The Lamp and the Star	
ECM 1373	1988	Dave Holland Trio	Triplicate	
ECM 1374	1988	Eberhard Weber	Orchestra	
ECM 1375	1988	Dino Saluzzi	Andina	
ECM 1377	1992	Werner Bärtschi	Mozart / Scelsi / Pärt / Bärtschi / Busoni	ECM New Series
ECM 1378	1991	Heinz Reber	Mnaomai, Mnomai	ECM New Series
ECM 1379	1988	Keith Jarrett	Dark Intervals	
ECM 1380	1989	Steve Tibbetts	Big Map Idea	
ECM 1381	1988	Jan Garbarek	Legend of the Seven Dreams	
ECM 1382	1989	Keith Jarrett	Personal Mountains	
ECM 1383	1989	Terje Rypdal	The Singles Collection	
ECM 1384	1989	Stephan Micus	The Music of Stones	
ECM 1385	1989	The Hilliard Ensemble	Perotin	ECM New Series
ECM 1386	1989	Paul Giger	Chartres	ECM New Series
ECM 1387	1989	Egberto Gismonti	Dança dos escravos	
ECM 1388	1989	Ralph Towner	City of Eyes	
ECM 1389	1990	Terje Rypdal	Undisonus	
ECM 1390	1989	John Abercrombie / Marc Johnson / Peter Erskine	John Abercrombie / Marc Johnson / Peter Erskine	
ECM 1391	1990	Thomas Demenga	Bach: Suite No. 3 for Cello Solo / Carter: Esprit rude, esprit doux; Enchanted Preludes	ECM New Series
ECM 1392	1989	Keith Jarrett / Gary Peacock / Jack DeJohnette	Changeless	
ECM 1393	1989	First House	Cantilena	
ECM 1394	1989	AM4 Wolfgang Puschnig / Linda Sharrock / Uli Scherer	... and she answered:	
ECM 1395	1989	Keith Jarrett	J.S. Bach: Goldberg Variations	ECM New Series
ECM 1396	1990	Mikhail Alperin / Arkady Shilkloper	Wave of Sorrow	
ECM 1397	1989	Shankar	Nobody Told Me	
ECM 1398	1990	Charles Lloyd	Fish Out of Water	
ECM 1399	1990	Meredith Monk	Book of Days	ECM New Series

=== ECM 14xx – ===
Catalog number	Year	Artist	Title	Notes
ECM 1400	N/A	N/A	N/A	unissued
ECM 1401	1990	Keith Jarrett	Paris Concert	live
ECM 1402	1989	Agnes Buen Garnås / Jan Garbarek	Rosensfole	
ECM 1403	1991	Shankar	M. R. C. S.	
ECM 1404	1990	Markus Stockhausen	Aparis	
ECM 1405	1989	Various Artists	ECM ECM New Series Anthology	
ECM 1406	1992	Karlheinz Stockhausen	MICHAELs REISE Solisten-Version (1977/78)	ECM New Series
ECM 1407	1990	Shankar	Pancha Nadai Pallavi	
ECM 1408	1990	Sidsel Endresen	So I Write	
ECM 1409	1990	Berlin Contemporary Jazz Orchestra	Berlin Contemporary Jazz Orchestra	
ECM 1410	1990	David Holland Quartet	Extensions	
ECM 1411	1990	John Abercrombie	Animato	
ECM 1412	1991	Walter Fähndrich	Viola	ECM New Series
ECM 1413	1990	Edward Vesala Sound & Fury	Ode to the Death of Jazz	
ECM 1415/16	1990	Kenny Wheeler	Music for Large & Small Ensembles	
ECM 1417	1990	Kenny Wheeler	The Widow in the Window	
ECM 1418	1990	John Surman	Road to Saint Ives	
ECM 1419	1990	Jan Garbarek	I Took Up the Runes	
ECM 1420/21	1990	Keith Jarrett Trio	Tribute	
ECM 1422/23	1991	The Hilliard Ensemble	Gesualdo: Tenebrae	ECM New Series
ECM 1424	1991	Gavin Bryars	After the Requiem	ECM New Series
ECM 1425	1991	Kim Kashkashian / Robert Levin / Robin Schulkowsky	Dmitri Shostakovich / Paul Seiko Chihara / Linda Bouchard	ECM New Series
ECM 1426	1991	Paul Giger	Alpstein	
ECM 1427	1990	Stephan Micus	Darkness and Light	
ECM 1428	1991	Egberto Gismonti Group	Infância	
ECM 1429	1991	Eleni Karaindrou	Music for Films	
ECM 1430	1991	The Hilliard Ensemble	Arvo Pärt: Miserere	ECM New Series
ECM 1431	1992	Christopher Bowers-Broadbent	Trivium	ECM New Series
ECM 1432	1991	Anouar Brahem	Barzakh	
ECM 1433/34	1991	Keith Jarrett	J.S. Bach: Das Wohltemperierte Klavier, Buch II	ECM New Series
ECM 1435	1991	Arild Andersen	Sagn	
ECM 1436	1991	Christy Doran / Freddy Studer / Bobby Burri / Oliver Magnetat	Musik für zwei Kontrabasse, Elektrische Gitarre und Schlagzeug	
ECM 1437	1991	Masqualero	Re-Enter	
ECM 1438/39	1992	Jimmy Giuffre 3	1961	
ECM 1440	1991	Keith Jarrett / Gary Peacock / Jack DeJohnette	The Cure	
ECM 1442	1992	Jan Garbarek / Ustad Fateh Ali Khan & Musicians from Pakistan	Ragas and Sagas	
ECM 1444	1991	Jan Garbarek / Miroslav Vitous / Peter Erskine	StAR	
ECM 1445	1992	Jon Balke with Oslo 13	Nonsentration	
ECM 1446	1992	Tamia / Pierre Favre	Solitudes	
ECM 1447	1992	Dino Saluzzi Group	Mojotoro	
ECM 1448	1994	Don Cherry / Lennart Åberg / Bobo Stenson	Dona Nostra	
ECM 1449	1994	Trevor Watts / Moiré Music Drum Orchestra	A Wider Embrace	
ECM 1450	1994	Keith Jarrett	Bridge of Light	ECM New Series
ECM 1451	1992	Barre Phillips	Aquarian Rain	
ECM 1452–54	1994	Heiner Goebbels	Hörstücke	ECM New Series
ECM 1455	1991	Hal Russell	The Finnish/Swiss Tour	
ECM 1456	1992	Eleni Karaindrou	The Suspended Step of the Stork	
ECM 1457	1992	Anouar Brahem	Conte de l'incroyable amour	
ECM 1458	1992	Louis Sclavis Quintet	Rouge	
ECM 1459/60	1992	Veljo Tormis	Forgotten Peoples	ECM New Series
ECM 1461	1992	Edward Vesala / Sound & Fury	Invisible Storm	
ECM 1462	1992	Ralph Towner	Open Letter	
ECM 1463	1992	John Surman	Adventure Playground	
ECM 1464	1992	David Darling	Cello	
ECM 1465	1992	Charles Lloyd	Notes from Big Sur	
ECM 1466	1992	Krakatau	Volition	
ECM 1467	1993	Keith Jarrett / Gary Peacock / Jack DeJohnette	Bye Bye Blackbird	
ECM 1469/70	1992	Keith Jarrett	Dmitri Shostakovich: 24 Preludes and Fugues Op. 87	ECM New Series
ECM 1471	1992	Kim Kashkashian, Dennis Russell Davies	Giya Kancheli: Vom Winde Beweint	ECM New Series
ECM 1472/73	1993	Heinz Holliger	Scardanelli-Zyklus	ECM New Series
ECM 1474	1993	Terje Rypdal	Q.E.D.	
ECM 1475	1993	Miroslav Vitous	Atmos	
ECM 1476	1993	The Hilliard Ensemble	Walter Frye: Missa Flos regalis, Motets	ECM New Series
ECM 1477	1993	Thomas Demenga, Hansheinz Schneeberger, Tabea Zimmermann	J. S. Bach: Suite No. 1 for Cello / Veress: Sonatas, Trio	ECM New Series
ECM 1478	1993	John Surman / John Warren	The Brass Project	
ECM 1479	1993	Parnasso Quartet	Jens-Peter Ostendorf: String Quartet	ECM New Series
ECM 1480	1993	Heiner Goebbels	SHADOW / Landscape with Argonauts	
ECM 1481	1992	Keith Jarrett	Vienna Concert	
ECM 1482	1992	Meredith Monk with Robert Een	Facing North	ECM New Series
ECM 1483	1993	Ensemble Modern, Peter Rundel	Heiner Goebbels: La Jalousie, Red Run, Herakles 2, Befreiung	ECM New Series
ECM 1484	1992	Hal Russell	Hal's Bells	
ECM 1485	1993	Michael Mantler	Folly Seeing All This	
ECM 1486	1992	Stephan Micus	To the Evening Child	
ECM 1487	1993	Paul Giger	Schattenwelt	ECM New Series
ECM 1488	1993	Paul Bley / Gary Peacock / Tony Oxley / John Surman	In the Evenings out There	
ECM 1489	1993	John Abercrombie Trio	While We're Young	
ECM 1490	1994	Gary Peacock / Ralph Towner	Oracle	
ECM 1491/92	1993	Meredith Monk	Atlas (An Opera in Three Parts)	ECM New Series
ECM 1493	1993	Arild Andersen / Ralph Towner / Nana Vasconcelos	If You Look Far Enough	
ECM 1494	1995	Christopher Bowers-Broadbent	Olivier Messiaen: Méditations sur le Mystère de la Sainte Trinité	ECM New Series
ECM 1495	1993	Sarah Leonard, Christopher Bowers-Broadbent	Górecki: O Domina Nostra / Satie / Milhaud / Bryars	ECM New Series
ECM 1496	1993	Aparis	Despite the Fire Fighters' Efforts...	
ECM 1497	1993	Peter Erskine	You Never Know	
ECM 1498	1993	Hal Russell	The Hal Russell Story	
ECM 1499	1994	Wolfgang Puschnig / Red Sun / Kim Duk Soo / Samul Nori / Linda Sharrock	Then Comes the White Tiger	

=== ECM 15xx – ===
Catalog number	Year	Artist	Title	Notes
ECM 1500	1993	Jan Garbarek Group	Twelve Moons	
ECM 1501	1994	Kim Kashkashian, Keith Jarrett	J.S. Bach: 3 Sonatas for Viola da Gamba and Harpsichord	ECM New Series
ECM 1502	1993	John Abercrombie / Marc Johnson / Peter Erskine / John Surman	November	
ECM 1503	1993	Ketil Bjørnstad	Water Stories	
ECM 1504	1995	The Hilliard Ensemble	Codex Speciálník	ECM New Series
ECM 1505	1993	Arvo Pärt	Te Deum	ECM New Series
ECM 1506	1993	Kim Kashkashian, Stuttgarter Kammerorchester, Dennis Russell Davies	Hindemith / Britten / Penderecki: Lachrymae	ECM New Series
ECM 1507	1993	Wadada Leo Smith	Kulture Jazz	
ECM 1508	1995	Kim Kashkashian, Robert Levin, Eduard Brunner	Györgi Kurtág / Robert Schumann: Hommage à R. Sch.	ECM New Series
ECM 1509	1993	Egberto Gismonti Group	Música de sobrevivência	
ECM 1510	1995	Stuttgarter Kammerorchester, Dennis Russell Davies, Vasiko Tevdorashvili	Giya Kancheli: Abii ne Viderem	ECM New Series
ECM 1511	1994	John Abercrombie Trio	Speak of the Devil	
ECM 1512	1994	The Theatre of Voices / Paul Hillier	William Byrd: Motets and Mass for Four Voices	ECM New Series
ECM 1513/14	1993	Keith Jarrett	J.S. Bach: The French Suites	ECM New Series
ECM 1515	1994	Jan Garbarek / Anouar Brahem / Shaukat Hussain	Madar	
ECM 1516	1996	Bobo Stenson Trio	Reflections	
ECM 1517	1994	Jon Balke with the Magnetic North Orchestra	Further	
ECM 1518	1993	Eberhard Weber	Pendulum	
ECM 1519	1995	David Darling	Dark Wood	
ECM 1520/21	1995	Patrick Demenga / Thomas Demenga	12 Hommages à Paul Sacher pour Violoncelle	ECM New Series
ECM 1522	1993	Charles Lloyd	The Call	
ECM 1523	1995	Herbert Henck	Federico Mompou: Música Callada	ECM New Series
ECM 1524	1994	Sidsel Endresen	Exile	
ECM 1525	1994	Jan Garbarek / The Hilliard Ensemble	Officium	ECM New Series; live
ECM 1526	1994	Louis Sclavis / Dominique Pifarély	Acoustic Quartet	
ECM 1527	1994	Steve Tibbetts	The Fall of Us All	
ECM 1528	1995	John Surman	A Biography of the Rev. Absalom Dawe	
ECM 1529	1994	Krakatau	Matinale	
ECM 1530	1995	Keith Jarrett	Georg Friederich Handel: Suites for Keyboard	ECM New Series
ECM 1531	1994	Keith Jarrett / Gary Peacock / Paul Motian	At the Deer Head Inn	live
ECM 1532	1994	Peter Erskine	Time Being	
ECM 1533	1994	David James, Annemarie Dreyer, Ulrike Lachner, Rebecca Firth	Gavin Bryars: Incipit Vita Nova	ECM New Series
ECM 1534	1994	John Surman Quartet	Stranger than Fiction	
ECM 1535	1995	Giya Kancheli	Exil	ECM New Series
ECM 1536	1994	Lena Willemark / Ale Möller	Nordan	
ECM 1537	1995	Paul Bley / Evan Parker / Barre Phillips	Time Will Tell	
ECM 1538	1995	Azimuth	How It Was Then... Never Again	
ECM 1539	1996	Prague Chamber Choir, Josef Pancík	Dvořák / Janáček / Eben	ECM New Series
ECM 1540	1995	Heinz Holliger	Beiseit / Alb-Chehr	ECM New Series
ECM 1541	1994	Edward Vesala / Sound & Fury	Nordic Gallery	
ECM 1542	1995	Keith Jarrett / Gary Peacock / Jack DeJohnette	Standards in Norway	
ECM 1543	1995	Italian Instabile Orchestra	Skies of Europe	
ECM 1544	1995	Tomasz Stańko	Matka Joanna	
ECM 1545	1995	Ketil Bjørnstad / David Darling / Terje Rypdal / Jon Christensen	The Sea	
ECM 1546–48	1994	Azimuth	Azimuth / The Touchstone / Départ	
ECM 1549/50	1995	Jazzensemble des Hessischen Rundfunks	Atmospheric Conditions Permitting	
ECM 1551	1994	Stephan Micus	Athos	
ECM 1552	1995	Heiner Goebbels	Ou Bien le Débarquement Désastreux	ECM New Series
ECM 1553	1995	John Surman / Karin Krog / Terje Rypdal / Vigleik Storaas	Nordic Quartet	
ECM 1554	1995	Terje Rypdal	If Mountains Could Sing	
ECM 1555	1995	Heinz Holliger	Sándor Veress: Passacaglia / Songs / Musica Concertante	ECM New Series
ECM 1556	1995	Michael Mantler	Cerco un paese innocente	
ECM 1557	1995	Charles Lloyd	All My Relations	
ECM 1558	1996	Jack DeJohnette	Dancing with Nature Spirits	
ECM 1559	1997	Marilyn Mazur's Future Song	Small Labyrinths	
ECM 1560	1997	Nils Petter Molvær	Khmer	
ECM 1560/M		Nils Petter Molvær	Khmer: The Remixes	
ECM 1561	1995	Anouar Brahem	Khomsa	
ECM 1562	1995	Gateway	Homecoming	
ECM 1563	1996	Ralph Towner	Lost and Found	
ECM 1564	1995	Robyn Schulkowsky / Nils Petter Molvær	Hastening Westward	ECM New Series
ECM 1565/66	1996	Keith Jarrett, Stuttgarter Kammerorchester, Dennis Russell Davies	Mozart: Piano Concertos; Masonic Funeral Music; Symphony in G	ECM New Series
ECM 1567	2000	Terje Rypdal	Double Concerto / Symphony No. 5	
ECM 1568	1997	Giya Kancheli	Caris Mere	ECM New Series
ECM 1569	1996	Herbert Henck	Alexandr Mosolov: Piano Music	ECM New Series
ECM 1570	1995	Eleni Karaindrou	Ulysses' Gaze	ECM New Series
ECM 1571	1996	Thomas Demenga	Johann Sebastian Bach: Suite No. 2 for Cello, BWV 1008	ECM New Series
ECM 1572	1996	Dave Holland Quartet	Dream of the Elders	
ECM 1573	1996	Steve Kuhn	Remembering Tomorrow	
ECM 1574	1996	Gateway	In the Moment	
ECM 1575–80	1995	Keith Jarrett / Gary Peacock / Jack DeJohnette	Keith Jarrett at the Blue Note	live at the Blue Note Jazz Club; boxset
ECM 1581	1996	Kimiko Hagiwara, Dohyung Kim, Junko Kuribayashi	Heinz Reber: MA – Two Songs	ECM New Series
ECM 1582	1996	Egberto Gismonti Trio	ZigZag	
ECM 1583	1999	Alfred Schnittke	Psalms of Repentance	ECM New Series
ECM 1584	1996	Pierre Favre	Window Steps	
ECM 1585	1996	Jan Garbarek	Visible World	
ECM 1586	1997	Egberto Gismonti	Meeting Point	
ECM 1587	1997	Michelle Makarski	Caoine	ECM New Series
ECM 1588	1996	Louis Sclavis Sextet	Les Violences de Rameau	
ECM 1589	1997	Meredith Monk	Volcano Songs	ECM New Series
ECM 1590	1996	Tallinn Chamber Orchestra, Estonian Philharmonic Chamber Choir, Tonu Kaljuste	Erkki-Sven Tüür: Crystallisatio	ECM New Series
ECM 1591	1999	Arvo Pärt	Alina	ECM New Series
ECM 1592	1996	Arvo Pärt	Litany	ECM New Series
ECM 1593	1997	Ketil Bjørnstad / David Darling	The River	
ECM 1594	1996	Peter Erskine	As It Is	
ECM 1595	1998	Thomas Demenga / Hansheinz Schneeberger / Jörg Ewald Dähler	Franz Schubert: Trio in Es-Dur / Notturno	ECM New Series
ECM 1596	1996	Misha Alperin	North Story	
ECM 1597	1996	Joe Maneri / Joe Morris / Mat Maneri	Three Men Walking	
ECM 1598	1996	Keller Quartett	György Kurtág: Musik für Streichinstrumente	ECM New Series
ECM 1599	1997	Eduard Brunner	Dal Niente	ECM New Series

=== ECM 16xx – ===
Catalog number	Year	Artist	Title	Notes
ECM 1600/01	1997	Jean-Luc Godard	Nouvelle vague	ECM New Series
ECM 1602	1998	Ralph Towner / Gary Peacock	A Closer View	
ECM 1603	1997	Tomasz Stańko	Leosia	
ECM 1604	1998	Bobo Stenson Trio	War Orphans	
ECM 1605	1999	Daniel Cholette, Hansheinz Schneeberger	Charles Ives: Sonatas for Violin and Piano	ECM New Series
ECM 1606	1997	Ingrid Karlen	Anton Webern: Variations	ECM New Series
ECM 1607	1997	Kenny Wheeler / Lee Konitz / Dave Holland / Bill Frisell	Angel Song	
ECM 1608	1997	Terje Rypdal	Skywards	
ECM 1609	2000	Paul Bley / Evan Parker / Barre Phillips	Sankt Gerold	
ECM 1610	1996	Lena Willemark / Ale Möller	Agram	
ECM 1611	1997	Ralph Towner	Ana	
ECM 1612	1997	Evan Parker Electro-Acoustic Ensemble	Toward the Margins	ECM New Series
ECM 1613	N/A	N/A	N/A	unissued
ECM 1614/15	1996	The Hilliard Ensemble	A Hilliard Songbook: New Music for Voices	ECM New Series
ECM 1616	1997	Dino Saluzzi	Cité de la musique	
ECM 1617	1997	Joe Maneri Quartet	In Full Cry	
ECM 1618	1997	Heinz Holliger	Lieder ohne Worte	ECM New Series
ECM 1619	1997	Györgi Kurtág	Játékok	ECM New Series
ECM 1620	1997	Dennis Russell Davies, Stuttgarter Kammerorchester	Shostakovich / Vasks / Schnittke: Dolorosa	ECM New Series
ECM 1621	1999	Herbert Henck	Jean Barraqué: Sonate pour piano	ECM New Series
ECM 1622	1997	Michael Cain / Ralph Alessi / Peter Epstein	Circa	
ECM 1623	1997	John Abercrombie / Dan Wall / Adam Nussbaum	Tactics	
ECM 1624/25	1999	Keith Jarrett and Dennis Russell Davies	Mozart: Piano Concertos K. 271, 453, 466	ECM New Series
ECM 1626/27	1997	Marilyn Crispell / Gary Peacock / Paul Motian	Nothing Ever Was, Anyway: Music of Annette Peacock	
ECM 1628	1998	Christian Wallumrød Trio	No Birch	
ECM 1629	1997	Rosamunde Quartett	Webern / Shostakovich / Burian	ECM New Series
ECM 1630	1997	Kim Kashkashian, Robert Levin	Johannes Brahms: Sonaten für Viola und Klavier	ECM New Series
ECM 1631	1997	Arild Andersen	Hyperborean	
ECM 1632	1997	Stephan Micus	The Garden of Mirrors	
ECM 1633	1998	Ketil Bjørnstad, David Darling, Jon Christensen, Terje Rypdal	The Sea II	
ECM 1635	1997	Charles Lloyd	Canto	
ECM 1636	1997	Tomasz Stańko Septet	Litania – Music of Krzysztof Komeda	
ECM 1637	1997	Jack DeJohnette	Oneness	
ECM 1638	1998	Dino Saluzzi / Rosamunde Quartett	Kultrum: Music for Bandeon and String Quartet	ECM New Series
ECM 1639	1997	John Surman	Proverbs and Songs	
ECM 1640	1997	Keith Jarrett	La Scala	
ECM 1641	1998	Anouar Brahem / John Surman / Dave Holland	Thimar	
ECM 1642	2006	OM	A Retrospective	compilation
ECM 1643	1999	Maya Homburger and Barry Guy	Ceremony	ECM New Series
ECM 1644	N/A	N/A	N/A	unissued
ECM 1645	N/A	N/A	N/A	unissued
ECM 1646	1998	Giya Kancheli	Trauerfarbenes Land	ECM New Series
ECM 1647	1998	Dominique Pifarély, François Couturier	Poros	
ECM 1648/49	1996	Michael Mantler	The School of Understanding	
ECM 1650	1997	Various Artists	Selected Signs, Vol. I: An ECM Anthology	
ECM 1651	1999	Roscoe Mitchell	Nine to Get Ready	
ECM 1652	1998	Keller Quartett	J.S. Bach: Die Kunst der Fuge	ECM New Series
ECM 1653	2000	The Hilliard Ensemble	In Paradisum: Music of Victoria and Palestrina	ECM New Series
ECM 1654/55	1998	Estonian Philharmonic Chamber Choir, Kaljuste	Arvo Pärt: Kanon Pokajanen	ECM New Series
ECM 1656	1999	Giya Kancheli	Lament	ECM New Series
ECM 1657	1999	Peter Erskine	Juni	
ECM 1658	1998	The Hilliard Ensemble	Lassus: Missa pro Defunctis, Prophetiae Sibyllarum	ECM New Series
ECM 1659	1999	Herbert Henck	Hans Otte: Das Buch der Klange	ECM New Series
ECM 1660	1999	Mats Edén, Jonas Simonson, Cikada String Quartet	Milvus	
ECM 1661	1998	Joe Maneri / Mat Maneri	Blessed	
ECM 1662	1999	Philipp Wachsmann, Paul Lytton	Some Other Season	
ECM 1663	1998	Dave Holland Quintet	Points of View	
ECM 1664	1999	Misha Alperin, John Surman	First Impression	
ECM 1665	1999	Bent Sørensen	Birds and Bells	ECM New Series
ECM 1666	1998	Keith Jarrett / Gary Peacock / Jack DeJohnette	Tokyo '96	live
ECM 1667	1999	Thomas Larcher	Arnold Schoenberg / Franz Schubert: Piano Pieces/Klavierstücke	ECM New Series
ECM 1668	1999	John Holloway	Johann Heinrich Schmelzer: Unarum Fidium	ECM New Series
ECM 1669	2000	Mstislav Rostropovich	Giya Kancheli: Magnum Ignotum	ECM New Series
ECM 1670	1999	Paul Bley / Gary Peacock / Paul Motian	Not Two, Not One	
ECM 1671/72	1999	Holliger, Jacottet & Friends	Jan Dismas Zelenka: Trio Sonatas	ECM New Series
ECM 1673	1999	David Geringas and Dennis Russell Davies	Erkki-Sven Tüür: Flux	ECM New Series
ECM 1674	1999	Charles Lloyd	Voice in the Night	
ECM 1675	1999	Keith Jarrett	The Melody at Night, with You	
ECM 1676/77	1999	András Schiff / Peter Serkin	Mozart / Reger / Busoni: Music for Two Pianos	ECM New Series
ECM 1678	1999	Joe Maneri / Mat Maneri / Barre Philips	Tales of Rohnlief	
ECM 1679	2005	Alexei Lubimov	Stravinsky / Shostakovich / Prokofiev / Scriabin: Messe Noire	ECM New Series
ECM 1680	1998	Tomasz Stańko	From the Green Hill	
ECM 1681	2000	Paul Giger	Ignis	ECM New Series
ECM 1682	1998	Valery Afanassiev	Franz Schubert: Sonata in B flat, D 960	ECM New Series
ECM 1683	1999	John Abercrombie	Open Land	
ECM 1684	2000	Ketil Bjørnstad / David Darling	Epigraphs	
ECM 1685/86	1998	Jan Garbarek	Rites	
ECM 1687	1999	Tõnu Kaljuste, Estonian Philharmonic	Veljo Tormis: Litany to Thunder	ECM New Series
ECM 1688	2000	Heiner Goebbels	Surrogate Cities	ECM New Series
ECM 1689	N/A	N/A	N/A	unissued
ECM 1690	1999	Per Gudmundson / Ale Möller / Lena Willemark	Frifot	
ECM 1691	1999	Kenny Wheeler	A Long Time Ago	
ECM 1692	1998	Eleni Karaindrou	Eternity and a Day	ECM New Series
ECM 1693	1999	Evan Parker	Drawn Inward	
ECM 1694	1999	Arditti Quartet	Peter Ruzicka: String Quartets	ECM New Series
ECM 1695	2000	Patrick Demenga / Thomas Demenga	Lux Aeterna	ECM New Series
ECM 1696	2000	John Cage	The Seasons	ECM New Series
ECM 1697	1999	John Dowland	In Darkness Let Me Dwell	ECM New Series
ECM 1698	1999	Dave Holland	Prime Directive	
ECM 1699	2000	András Schiff	Franz Schubert: C Major Fantasies	ECM New Series

=== ECM 17xx – ===
Catalog number	Date released	Artist	Title	Notes
ECM 1700/01	1999	Jan Garbarek / Hilliard Ensemble	Mnemosyne	ECM New Series
ECM 1702	2000	John Surman	Coruscating	
ECM 1703	2000	Gianluigi Trovesi / Gianni Coscia	In cerca di cibo	
ECM 1704	2000	Markus Stockhausen / Arild Andersen / Terje Rypdal	Karta	
ECM 1705	2001	Louis Sclavis Quintet	L'affrontement des prétendants	
ECM 1706–10	1999	Jean-Luc Godard	Histoire(s) du cinéma	ECM New Series
ECM 1711	2000	Kim Kashkashian, Netherlands Radio Chamber Orchestra, Peter Eötvös	Béla Bartók / Peter Eötvös / György Kurtág	ECM New Series
ECM 1712	2000	Michelle Makarski	Elogio per un'ombra	ECM New Series
ECM 1713	2005	Michael Galasso	High Lines	
ECM 1714	2001	Thomas Zehetmair, Camerata Bern	Verklärte Nacht – Schoenberg / Veress / Bartók	ECM New Series
ECM 1715/16	2001	Juliane Banse, Cornelia Kallisch, Steve Davislim, Oliver Widmer, Werner Göschel, Orchester der Oper Zürich, Heinz Holliger	Heinz Holliger: Schneewittchen	ECM New Series
ECM 1717	N/A	N/A	N/A	unissued
ECM 1718	2000-09-18	Anouar Brahem Trio	Astrakan café	
ECM 1719	2001	Mat Maneri	Trinity	
ECM 1720	2000	Isabelle Faust, Paul Meyer, Münchener Kammerorchester, Christoph Poppen	Karl Amadeus Hartmann: Funèbre	ECM New Series
ECM 1721	2000	Michael Mantler	Songs and One Symphony	
ECM 1722	2000	Nils Petter Molvær	Solid Ether	
ECM 1723	2000	Bruno Ganz	Wenn Wasser wäre – T.S. Eliot / Giorgos Seferis	ECM New Series
ECM 1724/25	2000	Keith Jarrett, Gary Peacock, Jack DeJohnette	Whisper Not	
ECM 1726	2001	Herbert Henck	Piano Music – Conlon Nancarrow / George Antheil	ECM New Series
ECM 1727	2001	Zehetmair Quartet	Karl Amadeus Hartmann / Béla Bartók	ECM New Series
ECM 1728	2000	Vassilis Tsabropoulos / Arild Andersen / John Marshall	Achirana	
ECM 1729	2002	András Keller / János Pilz	Béla Bartók: 44 Duos for Two Violins	ECM New Series
ECM 1730	2003	Kurt Widmer / Orlando Trio	György Kurtág: Signs, Games and Messages	ECM New Series
ECM 1731	2005	Mstislav Rostropovich	Alexander Knaifel: Amicta Sole	ECM New Series
ECM 1732	2000	Robin Williamson	The Seed-at-Zero	
ECM 1733	2000	Annette Peacock	An Acrobat's Heart	
ECM 1734	2000	Charles Lloyd	The Water Is Wide	
ECM 1735	2001	Kim Kashkashian	Luciano Berio: Voci	ECM New Series
ECM 1736	2001	András Schiff	Leoš Janáček: A Recollection	ECM New Series
ECM 1737	2003	Vassilis Tsabropoulos	Akroasis	
ECM 1738	2001	Michael Mantler	Hide and Seek	
ECM 1739	2001	Ensemble Belcanto / Dietburg Spohr	Come un'ombra di luna	ECM New Series
ECM 1740/41	2000	Bobo Stenson Trio	Serenity	
ECM 1742	2001	Marilyn Crispell / Gary Peacock / Paul Motian	Amaryllis	
ECM 1743	2001	Ralph Towner	Anthem	
ECM 1744	2000	Trygve Seim	Different Rivers	
ECM 1745	2001	Tallinn Chamber Orchestra / Tõnu Kaljuste	Heino Eller: Neenia	ECM New Series
ECM 1746	2001	Charlie Haden / Egberto Gismonti	In Montreal	
ECM 1747	2001	Thomas Larcher	Naunz	ECM New Series
ECM 1748	2001	Eberhard Weber	Endless Days	
ECM 1749	2001	Claudio Puntin / Gerdur Gunnarsdóttir	Ylir	
ECM 1750	2000	Various Artists	Suite for Sampler, Select Signs II	
ECM 1751	2003	John Taylor Trio	Rosslyn	
ECM 1752	2003	Arild Andersen	The Triangle	
ECM 1753	2001	Trio Mediaeval	Word of an Angel	ECM New Series
ECM 1754	2003	Kim Kashkashian	Hayren	ECM New Series
ECM 1755	2003	Keller Quartet / Alexei Lubimov	Alfred Schnittke / Dmitri Shostakovich: Lento	ECM New Series
ECM 1756	2001	Rosamunde Quartett	Franz Josef Haydn: The Seven Words	ECM New Series
ECM 1757	2001	Stephan Micus	Desert Poems	
ECM 1758	2001	Dave Holland Quintet	Not for Nothin'	
ECM 1759	N/A	N/A	N/A	unissued
ECM 1760	2004	Enrico Rava	Easy Living	
ECM 1761	2004	Harald Bergmann	Scardanelli	ECM New Series
ECM 1762	2001	Anders Jormin	Xieyi	
ECM 1763	2002	Keller Quartet	Alexander Knaifel: Svete Tikhiy	ECM New Series
ECM 1764	2004	Trygve Seim / Øyvind Brække / Per Oddvar Johansen	The Source and Different Cikadas	
ECM 1765	2001	Christoph Poppen / The Hilliard Ensemble	Morimur	ECM New Series
ECM 1766	2001	Susanne Abbuehl	April	
ECM 1767	2005	Gidon Kremer / Oleg Maisenberg / Kremerata Baltica	Giya Kancheli: In l'istesso tempo	ECM New Series
ECM 1768	2001	Misha Alperin	At Home	
ECM 1769	2002	Misha Alperin / Ajna Lechner / H.-K. Sørensen	Night	
ECM 1770	2002	John Abercrombie	Cat 'n' Mouse	
ECM 1771	2002	Alexei Lubimov	Der Bote	ECM New Series
ECM 1772	2003	Juliane Banse / András Schiff	Songs of Debussy and Mozart	ECM New Series
ECM 1773	2004	Giya Kancheli	Diplipito	ECM New Series
ECM 1774	2003	Christoph Poppen / Hilliard Ensemble	Bach / Webern: Ricercar	ECM New Series
ECM 1775	2002	Sofia Gubaidulina	Sofia Gubaidulina	ECM New Series
ECM 1776	2002	Valentin Silvestrov	Leggiero, Pesante	ECM New Series
ECM 1777	2002	Dave Holland Big Band	What Goes Around	
ECM 1778	2004	Valentin Silvestrov	Requiem for Larissa	ECM New Series
ECM 1779	2002	Heiner Goebbels	Eislermaterial	ECM New Series
ECM 1780	2001	Keith Jarrett / Gary Peacock / Jack DeJohnette	Inside Out	
ECM 1781	2002	Alexander Lonquich / Auryn Quartet / Ora Rotem Nelken	Gideon Lewensohn: Odradek	ECM New Series
ECM 1782/83	2002	Thomas Demenga	Yun/Bach/Hosowaka	ECM New Series
ECM 1784	2001	Charles Lloyd	Hyperion with Higgins	
ECM 1785	2002	Robin Williamson	Skirting the River Road	
ECM 1786	2007	Paul Bley	Solo in Mondsee	live
ECM 1787	2002	Yves Robert	In Touch	
ECM 1788	2002	Tomasz Stańko Quartet	Soul of Things	
ECM 1789	2002	Helmut Lachenmann	Schwankungen am Rand	ECM New Series
ECM 1790	2003	Valentin Silvestrov	Metamusik / Postludium	ECM New Series
ECM 1791	2002	John Holloway	Unam Ceylum	ECM New Series
ECM 1792	2002	Anouar Brahem	Le pas du chat noir	
ECM 1793	2003	Zehetmair Quartett	Robert Schumann	ECM New Series
ECM 1794	2002	Frode Haltli	Looking on Darkness	ECM New Series
ECM 1795	2002	Arvo Pärt	Orient & Occident	ECM New Series
ECM 1796	2002	John Surman / Jack DeJohnette	Invisible Nature	
ECM 1797	2004	Trygve Seim	Sangam	
ECM 1798	2008	Marek Konstantynowicz, Cikada Ensemble	Morton Feldman: The Viola in My Life	ECM New Series
ECM 1799	2005	The Cikada String Quartet	In Due Tempi	ECM New Series

=== ECM 18xx – ===
Catalog number	Year	Artist	Title	Notes
ECM 1800/01	2002	Keith Jarrett / Gary Peacock / Jack DeJohnette	Always Let Me Go	
ECM 1802	2003	John Surman	Free and Equal	
ECM 1803	2003	The Dowland Project / John Potter	Care-Charming Sleep	ECM New Series
ECM 1804	2002	Stephan Micus	Towards the Wind	
ECM 1805	2002	Louis Sclavis	Dans la nuit	
ECM 1806/07	2002	András Schiff	Robert Schumann: In Concert	ECM New Series
ECM 1808	2003	Art Ensemble of Chicago	Tribute to Lester	
ECM 1809	2003	Christian Wallumrød	Sofienberg Variations	
ECM 1810	2001	Eleni Karaindrou	Trojan Women	ECM New Series
ECM 1811	2007	Heiner Goebbels	Landschaft mit Entfernten Verwandten	ECM New Series
ECM 1812	2008	Giya Kancheli	Little Imber	ECM New Series
ECM 1813	2006	Michael Mantler	Review (1968–2000)	
ECM 1814	2002	Steve Tibbetts	A Man About a Horse	
ECM 1815	2004	Steve Kuhn	Promises Kept	
ECM 1816	2003	Dino Saluzzi Trio	Responsorium	
ECM 1817	2003	Peter Eotvos	Elliott Carter: What Next?	ECM New Series
ECM 1818	2002	Terje Rypdal	Lux Aeterna	
ECM 1819/20	2004	András Schiff, Miklós Perényi	Ludwig van Beethoven: Music for Piano and Violoncello	ECM New Series
ECM 1821	2004	Alexander Lonquich	Plainte Calme	ECM New Series
ECM 1822	2002	Jon Balke & Magnetic North Orchestra	Kyanos	
ECM 1823	2004	The Hilliard Ensemble	Guillaume de Machaut: Motets	ECM New Series
ECM 1824	2003	Leonidas Kavakos / Péter Nagy	Maurice Ravel / George Enescu: Sonate Posthume / Sonata No. 3	ECM New Series
ECM 1825	2003	András Schiff	J.S. Bach: Goldberg Variations	ECM New Series
ECM 1826	2005	Dennis Russell Davies	Stravinsky: Orchestral Works	ECM New Series
ECM 1827	2003	Gianluigi Trovesi Ottetto	Fugace	
ECM 1828	2002	Orchestre National de Jazz	Charmediterranéen	
ECM 1829	2002	Meredith Monk	Mercy	ECM New Series
ECM 1830	2003	Isabelle van Keulen / CBSO / Paavo Järvi	Erkki-Sven Tüür: Exodus	ECM New Series
ECM 1831	2006	Martin Speake	Change of Heart	
ECM 1832/33	2002	Charles Lloyd	Lift Every Voice	
ECM 1834	2003	Tord Gustavsen	Changing Places	
ECM 1835	2004	Thomas Zehetmair	Eugène Ysaÿe: Sonates pour Violon Solo	ECM New Series
ECM 1836		Paul Giger	Vindonissa	
ECM 1837	2004	John Holloway	Biber / Muffat: Der Tüken Anmarsch	ECM New Series
ECM 1838	2003	Sylvie Courvoisier	Abaton	
ECM 1840	2003	Ghazal	The Rain	
ECM 1841	N/A	N/A	N/A	unissued
ECM 1842/43	2003	Herbert Henck	Locations	ECM New Series
ECM 1844	2005	Herbert Henck	John Cage: Early Piano Music	ECM New Series
ECM 1845	2005	Dino Saluzzi	Senderos	
ECM 1846	2004	John Abercrombie	Class Trip	
ECM 1847	2004	Marilyn Crispell Trio	Storyteller	
ECM 1848/49	2003	Heinz Holliger	Lauds and Lamentations	ECM New Series
ECM 1850/51	2002	Tigran Mansurian, Kim Kashkashian	Monodia	ECM New Series
ECM 1852	2003	Evan Parker	Memory/Vision	
ECM 1853/54	2004	Till Fellner	Johann Sebastian Bach: Das Wohltemperierte Klavier I	ECM New Series
ECM 1855	2005	Leonidas Kavakos / Peter Nagy	Igor Stravinsky / Johann Sebastian Bach	ECM New Series
ECM 1856	2003	Savina Yannatou / Primavera en Salonico	Terra Nostra	
ECM 1857	2003	Louis Sclavis	Napoli's Walls	
ECM 1858/59	2004	Helmut Lachenmann	Das Mädchen mit den Schwefelhölzern	ECM New Series
ECM 1860	2003	Keith Jarrett / Gary Peacock / Jack DeJohnette	Up for It	
ECM 1861	2005	Stephen Hartke	Tituli / Cathedral in the Thrashing Rain	ECM New Series
ECM 1862	2004	Joe Maneri / Barre Phillips / Mat Maneri	Angles of Repose	
ECM 1863	2003	Miroslav Vitous	Universal Syncopations	
ECM 1864/65	2003	Dave Holland Quintet	Extended Play: Live at Birdland	live at Birdland
ECM 1866	2004	Anders Jormin	In Winds, In Light	
ECM 1867	N/A	N/A	N/A	unissed
ECM 1868	2004	Tomasz Stańko Quartet	Suspended Night	
ECM 1869	2004	Trio Mediaeval	Soir, dit-elle	ECM New Series
ECM 1870	2005	Thomas Strønen	Parish	
ECM 1871	2006	Michelle Makarski	Giuseppe Tartini / Donald Crockett: To Be Sung on the Water	ECM New Series
ECM 1872	2007	Roscoe Mitchell	Composition/Improvisation Nos. 1, 2 & 3	
ECM 1873	2008	Evan Parker	Boustrophedon	
ECM 1874	2007	Zehetmair Quartett	Béla Bartók / Paul Hindemith	ECM New Series
ECM 1875	2007	The Hilliard Ensemble	J.S. Bach: Motetten	ECM New Series
ECM 1876	2004	Jacob Young	Evening Falls	
ECM 1877	2007	David Torn	Prezens	
ECM 1878/79	2004	Charles Lloyd / Billy Higgins	Which Way Is East	
ECM 1880	2004	Jan Garbarek	In Praise of Dreams	
ECM 1881	2003	Anouar Brahem	Vague	compilation 1990–2001
ECM 1882	2004	Frances-Marie Uitti / Paul Griffiths	There Is Still Time	ECM New Series
ECM 1883	2005	Gidon Kremer / Kremerata Baltica	Franz Schubert: String Quartet G Major	ECM New Series
ECM 1884	2006	The Hilliard Ensemble	Nicholas Gombert: Missa Media Vita in Morte Sumus	ECM New Series
ECM 1885	2004	Eleni Karaindrou	The Weeping Meadow	ECM New Series
ECM 1886	2004	Jon Balke	Diverted Travels	
ECM 1887	2007	Heinrich Schiff / Netherlands Radio Chamber Orchestra	Friedrich Cerha / Franz Schreker	ECM New Series
ECM 1888	2004	Anja Lechner / Vassilis Tsabropoulos	Gurdjieff / Tsabropoulos: Chants, Hymns and Dances	ECM New Series
ECM 1889	2005	John Holloway / Jaap ter Linden / Lars Ulrik Mortensen	Veracini: Sonatas	ECM New Series
ECM 1890	2004	Heinz Holliger	Violinkonzert	ECM New Series
ECM 1891	2005	Wasilewski / Kurkiewicz / Miskiewicz	Trio	
ECM 1892	2005	Tord Gustavsen Trio	The Ground	
ECM 1893	2006	Stephen Stubbs	Teatro Lirico	ECM New Series
ECM 1894	2005	Marc Johnson	Shades of Jade	
ECM 1895	2006	Tigran Mansurian	Ars poetica	ECM New Series
ECM 1896	2005	Manu Katché	Neighbourhood	
ECM 1897	2004	Stephan Micus	Life	
ECM 1898/99	2004	Valentin Silvestrov	Silent Songs	ECM New Series

=== ECM 19xx – ===
Catalog number	Date released	Artist	Title	Date recorded	Notes
ECM 1900	2004-08-30	Keith Jarrett / Gary Peacock / Jack DeJohnette	The Out-of-Towners	2001-07-28	live at the Bavarian State Opera
ECM 1901	2005-04	Christian Wallumrød Ensemble	A Year from Easter	2004-09	Rainbow Studio, Oslo
ECM 1902	2005-01-24	Paul Motian Trio	I Have the Room Above Her	2004-04	Avatar Studios, New York
ECM 1903	2005	Savina Yannatou	Sumiglia	2004-05	Rainbow Studio, Oslo
ECM 1904	2005-09-12	Bobo Stenson	Goodbye	2004-04	
ECM 1905	2005	Rosamunde Quartett	Tigran Mansurian: String Quartets		ECM New Series
ECM 1906	2006	Susanne Abbuehl	Compass		
ECM 1907	2005	Gianluigi Trovesi	Round About Weill		
ECM 1908	2005	Arild Andersen	Electra		
ECM 1909/10	2006	John Holloway	J.S. Bach: The Sonatas and Partitas		ECM New Series
ECM 1911	2005	Charles Lloyd	Jumping the Creek		
ECM 1912	2006	Frank-Peter Zimmermann / Heinrich Schiff	Arthur Honegger, Bohuslav Martinu, Johann Sebasitian Bach, Matthias Pintscher, Maurice Ravel		ECM New Series
ECM 1913	2007	Frode Haltli	Passing Images		
ECM 1914	2006	Thomas Demenga / Thomas Larcher / Teodoro Anzellotti	Chonguri		ECM New Series
ECM 1915	2006-02-24	Anouar Brahem	Le voyage de Sahar	2005-02	
ECM 1916	N/A	N/A	N/A	N/A	unissued
ECM 1917	2006-02	Paul Motian Band	Garden of Eden	Recorded	
ECM 1918	2005	Iro Haarla	Northbound		
ECM 1919	2007	Erkki-Sven Tüür	Oxymoron		ECM New Series
ECM 1920	2007	Eberhard Weber	Stages of a Long Journey		
ECM 1921	2005	Enrico Rava	Tati		
ECM 1922	2006	Rolf Lislevand	Nuove Musiche		ECM New Series
ECM 1923	2005	Andrey Dergatchev	The Return		
ECM 1924	2005	Evan Parker / Electro-Acoustic Ensemble	The Eleventh Hour		
ECM 1925	2008	Garth Knox	D'Amore		ECM New Series
ECM 1926/27	2005	Gidon Kremer	J.S. Bach: The Sonatas and Partitas		ECM New Series
ECM 1928	2006	Mark Feldman	What Exit		
ECM 1929	2005	Trio Mediaeval	Stella Maris		ECM New Series
ECM 1930	2005	Arvo Pärt	Lamentate		ECM New Series
ECM 1931	2005	Barry Guy	Folio		ECM New Series
ECM 1932	2005	Batagraf / Jon Balke	Statements		
ECM 1933/34	2005	Stefano Battaglia	Raccolto		
ECM 1935	2007	Valentin Silvestrov	Symphony No. 6		ECM New Series
ECM 1936	2008	The Hilliard Ensemble	Thomas Tallis, Christopher Tye, John Sheppard: Audivi Vocem		ECM New Series
ECM 1937	2007	Herbert Henck	Johann Ludwig Trepulka / Norbert von Hannenheim: Klavierstücke und Sonaten		ECM New Series
ECM 1938	2008	Monika Mauch / Nigel North	Musical Banquet		ECM New Series
ECM 1939	2006	Nik Bärtsch's Ronin	Stoa		
ECM 1940/41	2005	András Schiff	Ludwig van Beethoven: The Piano Sonatas, Vol I – Sonatas Opp. 2 and 7		ECM New Series
ECM 1942	2006	András Schiff	Ludwig van Beethoven: The Piano Sonatas, Vol II – Sonatas Opp. 10 and 13		ECM New Series
ECM 1943	2006	András Schiff	Ludwig van Beethoven: The Piano Sonatas, Vol III – Sonatas Opp. 49, 14 and 22		ECM New Series
ECM 1944	2007	András Schiff	Ludwig van Beethoven: The Piano Sonatas, Vol IV – Sonatas Opp. 26, 27 and 28		ECM New Series
ECM 1945/46	2007	András Schiff	Ludwig van Beethoven: The Piano Sonatas, Vol V – Sonatas Opp. 31 and 53		ECM New Series
ECM 1947	2008	András Schiff	Ludwig van Beethoven: The Piano Sonatas, Volume VI – Sonatas Opp. 54, 57, 78, 79 and 81a		ECM New Series
ECM 1948	2008	András Schiff	Ludwig van Beethoven: The Piano Sonatas, Volume VII – Sonatas Opp. 90, 101 and 106		ECM New Series
ECM 1949	2008	András Schiff	Ludwig van Beethoven: The Piano Sonatas, Volume VIII – Sonatas Opp. 109, 110 and 111		ECM New Series
ECM 1950	2016	András Schiff	Encores after Beethoven		ECM New Series
ECM 1951	2010	Steve Tibbetts	Natural Causes		
ECM 1952/53	2006	Eleni Karaindrou	Elegy of the Uprooting		ECM New Series
ECM 1954	2007	Louis Sclavis	L'imparfait des langues		
ECM 1955	2008	Helena Tulve	Lijnen		ECM New Series
ECM 1956	2007	John Surman	The Spaces in Between		
ECM 1957	2008	Alexander Knaifel	Blazhenstva		ECM New Series
ECM 1958	2007	Pablo Márquez	Musica del Delphin		ECM New Series
ECM 1959	2006	Valentin Silvestrov / Arvo Pärt / Galina Ustvolskaya	Misterioso		ECM New Series
ECM 1960/61	2005	Keith Jarrett	Radiance		
ECM 1962	2008	Marilyn Mazur / Jan Garbarek	Elixir		
ECM 1963	2006	Giacinto Scelsi	Natura Renovatur		ECM New Series
ECM 1964	2006	Stefano Bollani	Piano Solo		
ECM 1965	2006	Juliane Banse / András Keller	György Kurtág: Kafka-Fragmente		ECM New Series
ECM 1966	2006	The Source	The Source		
ECM 1967	2006	Rosamunde Quartett	Thomas Larcher: Ixxu		ECM New Series
ECM 1968	2006	Ralph Towner	Time Line		
ECM 1969	2006	Robin Williamson	The Iron Stone		
ECM 1970	2006	John Potter / The Dowland Project	Romaria		ECM New Series
ECM 1971	2008	Miki N'Doye	Tuki		
ECM 1972/73	2006	Trio Beyond (Jack DeJohnette, Larry Goldings, John Scofield)	Saudades		
ECM 1974	N/A	N/A	N/A	N/A	unissued
ECM 1975	2007	Kim Kashkashian / Robert Levin	Asturiana: Songs from Spain and Argentina		ECM New Series
ECM 1976	2006	Charles Lloyd	Sangam		
ECM 1977	2006	Pierre Favre Ensemble	Fleuve		
ECM 1978	2006	Dino Saluzzi Group	Juan Condori		
ECM 1979	2006	François Couturier	Nostalghia – Song for Tarkovsky		
ECM 1980	2006	Tomasz Stańko Quartet	Lontano		
ECM 1981	2006	Kayhan Kalhor / Erdal Erzincan	The Wind		
ECM 1982	2007	Enrico Rava	The Words and the Days		
ECM 1983	2007	Gianluigi Trovesi	Vaghissimo Ritratto		
ECM 1984	2006	Terje Rypdal	Vossabrygg	2003-04-12	live at Vossajazz
ECM 1985	2007	Vladimír Godár	Mater		ECM New Series
ECM 1986	2008	John Surman / Howard Moody	Rain on the Window		
ECM 1987	2006	Stephan Micus	On the Wing		
ECM 1988	2007	Valentin Silvestrov	Bagatellen und Serenaden		ECM New Series
ECM 1989/90	2006	Keith Jarrett	The Carnegie Hall Concert		
ECM 1991	2007	Dino Saluzzi / Anja Lechner	Ojos Negros		
ECM 1992	2007	Paul Motian Trio	Time and Time Again		
ECM 1993	2007	John Abercrombie	The Third Quartet		
ECM 1994	2007	Anat Fort	A Long Story		
ECM 1995	2008-02-12	Misha Alperin	Her First Dance	2006-07	
ECM 1996	2007	Sinikka Langeland	Starflowers		
ECM 1997	2007-11-02	Jacob Young	Sideways	2006-05	
ECM 1998/99	2007	Stefano Battaglia	Re: Pasolini		

=== ECM 20xx – ===
Catalog number	Date released	Artist	Title	Date recorded	Notes
ECM 2000	2016	András Schiff	The Piano Sonatas		ECM New Series; 11CD boxset
ECM 2001/02	2009	András Schiff	J. S. Bach: Six Partitas		ECM New Series
ECM 2003	2007	Trio Mediaeval	Folk Songs		ECM New Series
ECM 2004	2007	Wolfert Brederode Quartet	Currents		
ECM 2005	2007	Christian Wallumrød Ensemble	The Zoo Is Far		
ECM 2006	2013	Terje Rypdal	Melodic Warrior		
ECM 2007	N/A	N/A	N/A	N/A	unissued
ECM 2008	N/A	N/A	N/A	N/A	unissued
ECM 2009	2008	John Holloway / Jaap ter Linden / Lars Ulrik Mortensen	Jean-Marie Leclair: Sonatas		ECM New Series
ECM 2010	2007	Jon Balke	Book of Velocities		
ECM 2011	N/A	N/A	N/A	N/A	unissued
ECM 2012	N/A	N/A	N/A	N/A	unissued
ECM 2013	2007	Miroslav Vitous	Universal Syncopations II		
ECM 2014	2007	Paul Giger, Marie-Louise Dähler	Towards Silence		ECM New Series
ECM 2015	2008	Frank Martin	Triptychon		ECM New Series
ECM 2016	2007	Manu Katché	Playground		
ECM 2017	2007	Tord Gustavsen Trio	Being There		
ECM 2018	2013	John Potter	The Dowland Project – Night Sessions		ECM New Series
ECM 2019	2008	Marcin Wasilewski Trio	January		
ECM 2020	2007	Enrico Rava / Stefano Bollani	The Third Man		
ECM 2021/22	2007	Keith Jarrett / Gary Peacock / Jack DeJohnette	My Foolish Heart – Live at Montreux		live at the Montreux Jazz Festival
ECM 2023	2008	Bobo Stenson Trio	Cantando		
ECM 2024	2007	Gidon Kremer / Kremerata Baltica	Gustav Mahler / Dmitri Shostakovich		ECM New Series
ECM 2025	2009	Alfred Schnittke / Alexander Raskatov	Schnittke: Symphony No.9 / Raskatov: Nunc Dimittis		ECM New Series
ECM 2026	2008	Meredith Monk	Impermanence		ECM New Series
ECM 2027	2007	Marilyn Crispell	Vignettes		
ECM 2028	2008	Norma Winstone / Glauco Venier / Klaus Gesing	Distances		
ECM 2029	2009	Münchener Kammerorchester, Alexander Liebreich	Joseph Haydn / Isang Yun: Farewell		ECM New Series
ECM 2030–32	2008	Keith Jarrett / Gary Peacock / Jack DeJohnette	Setting Standards: New York Sessions		3CD boxset compiling Standards, Vol. 1 (1983), Changes (1984) & Standards, Vol. 2 (1985)
ECM 2033–35	2008	Codona	The Codona Trilogy		3CD boxset compiling Codona (1979), Codona 2 (1981) and Codona 3 (1983)
ECM 2036–39	2009	Gary Burton / Chick Corea	Crystal Silence – The ECM Recordings 1972–1979		4CD boxset compiling Crystal Silence (1973), Duet (1979) and In Concert, Zürich, October 28, 1979 (1980)
ECM 2040	2010	Erkki-Sven Tüür	Strata		ECM New Series
ECM 2041	2010	Terje Rypdal	Crime Scene		
ECM 2042	2009	Jon Balke	Siwan		
ECM 2043	2009	Till Fellner	J. S. Bach: Inventionen und Sinfonien, Französische Suite V		ECM New Series
ECM 2044	2008	Trygve Seim / Frode Haltli	Yeraz		
ECM 2045	2009	Alfred Zimmerlin	Euridice		ECM New Series
ECM 2046	2009	John Surman	Brewster's Rooster		
ECM 2047	2008	Carolin Widmann / Dénes Várjon	Robert Schumann: The Violin Sonatas		ECM New Series
ECM 2048	2008	Vassilis Tsabropoulos, Anja Lechner & U.T. Gandhi	Melos		
ECM 2049	2008	Nik Bärtsch's Ronin	Holon		
ECM 2050	2009	Arvo Pärt	In Principio		ECM New Series
ECM 2051	2012	Eberhard Weber	Résumé		
ECM 2052	2008	Ketil Bjørnstad / Terje Rypdal	Life in Leipzig		
ECM 2053	2008	Charles Lloyd	Rabo de Nube		
ECM 2054	2008	Michael Mantler	Concertos		
ECM 2055	2009	Heinz Holliger / Clara Schumann	Romancendres		ECM New Series
ECM 2056	2008	Ketil Bjørnstad	The Light		
ECM 2057	2008	Savina Yannatou	Songs of an Other		
ECM 2058	2008	Xavier Charles / Ivar Grydeland / Christian Wallumrød / Ingar Zach	Dans les Arbres		
ECM 2059	2008	Mathias Eick	The Door		
ECM 2060	2009	Keith Jarrett / Gary Peacock / Jack DeJohnette	Yesterdays		
ECM 2061	2009	Rosamunde Quartett, Christian Gerhaher	Othmar Schoeck: Notturno		ECM New Series
ECM 2062	2009	Andy Sheppard	Movements in Colour		
ECM 2063	2008	Stephan Micus	Snow		
ECM 2064	2009	Enrico Rava	New York Days		
ECM 2065	2009	Kim Kashkashian	Neharót		ECM New Series
ECM 2066	2009	The Evan Parker Electro-Acoustic Ensemble	The Moment's Energy		
ECM 2067	2009	Fly	Sky & Country		
ECM 2068	2008	Gianluigi Trovesi / All'Opera	Profumo di Violetta		
ECM 2069	2009	Nils Økland	Monograph		
ECM 2070	2009	Eleni Karaindrou	Dust of Time		ECM New Series
ECM 2071	2009	Ambrose Field & John Potter	Being Dufay		ECM New Series
ECM 2072	2013	Quartetto Prometeo	Stefano Scodanibbio: Reinventions		ECM New Series
ECM 2073	2009	Miroslav Vitous Group with Michel Portal	Remembering Weather Report		
ECM 2074	2008	Heinz Holliger	Bernd Alois Zimmermann: Canto di Speranza		ECM New Series
ECM 2075	2009-09-25	Anouar Brahem	The Astounding Eyes of Rita	2008-10	
ECM 2076	2009	Marc Sinan and Julia Hülsmann	Fasıl		
ECM 2077	2009	Jon Hassell	Last Night the Moon Came Dropping Its Clothes in the Street		
ECM 2078	2008	Arild Andersen	Live at Belleville		
ECM 2079	2008	Julia Hülsmann Trio	The End of a Summer		
ECM 2080	2009	Stefano Bollani	Stone in the Water		
ECM 2081	2009	Vassilis Tsabropoulos	The Promise		
ECM 2082/83	2009	Egberto Gismonti	Saudações		
ECM 2084	2009	Cyminology	As Ney		
ECM 2085	2009	Ralph Towner / Paolo Fresu	Chiaroscuro		
ECM 2086	2008	Arve Henriksen	Cartography		
ECM 2087	2010	Roscoe Mitchell and The Note Factory	Far Side		
ECM 2088	2009	Rolf Lislevand	Diminuito		ECM New Series
ECM 2089	2010	Marilyn Crispell / David Rothenberg	One Dark Night I Left My Silent House		
ECM 2090–92	2008	Steve Kuhn	Life's Backward Glances		3-CD boxset compiling Ecstasy (1975), Motility (1977) & Playground (1980)
ECM 2093/94	2009	Manfred Schoof Quintet	Resonance		
ECM 2095	2011	Toshio Hosokawa	Landscapes		ECM New Series
ECM 2096	2012	Masabumi Kikuchi Trio	Sunrise		
ECM 2097	2009	László Hortobágyi / György Kurtág Jr.	Kurtágonals		ECM New Series
ECM 2098	2009	Louis Sclavis	Lost on the Way		
ECM 2099	2009	Steve Kuhn	Mostly Coltrane		

=== ECM 21xx – ===
Catalog number	Year	Artist	Title	Notes
ECM 2100/01	2009	Jan Garbarek	Dresden	
ECM 2102	2009	John Abercrombie	Wait Till You See Her	
ECM 2103	2010	François Couturier	Un jour si blanc	
ECM 2104	2011	Alexander Lonquich	Schumann / Holliger	ECM New Series
ECM 2105	2010	Henri Dutilleux	D'ombre et de silence	ECM New Series
ECM 2106	2012	John Holloway / Lars Ulrik Mortensen / Jane Gower	Dario Castello / Giovanni Battista Fontana: Sonate concertate in stil moderno	ECM New Series
ECM 2107	2009	Tord Gustavsen Ensemble	Restored, Returned	
ECM 2108	2011	Ketil Bjørnstad / Svante Henryson	Night Song	
ECM 2109	2010	Anat Fort Trio	And If	
ECM 2110	2011	Jörg Widmann	Elegie	ECM New Series
ECM 2111	2010	Thomas Larcher	Madhares	ECM New Series
ECM 2112	2017	Alexei Lubimov	Carl Philipp Emanuel Bach – Tangere	ECM New Series
ECM 2113	2009	Carolin Widmann / Simon Lepper	Phantasy of Spring	ECM New Series
ECM 2114	2010	Till Fellner / Kent Nagano	Ludwig van Beethoven: Piano Concertos Nos. 4 and 5	ECM New Series
ECM 2115	2009-10	Tomasz Stańko Quintet	Dark Eyes	Recorded April 2009, Studios La Buissonne, Pernes les Fontaines
ECM 2116	2010	Markku Ounaskari / Samuli Mikkonen	Kuára	
ECM 2117	2009	Valentin Silvestrov	Sacred Works	ECM New Series
ECM 2118	2009	Christian Wallumrød Sextet	Fabula Suite Lugano	
ECM 2119	2017	John Potter	Secret History – Josquin/Victoria	ECM New Series
ECM 2120	2010	Stefano Battaglia	Pastorale	
ECM 2121	2010	Judith Berkson	Oylam	
ECM 2122/23	2011	András Schiff	Robert Schumann: Geistervariationen	ECM New Series
ECM 2124	2009	Thomas Zehetmair	Niccolò Paganini: 24 Caprices	ECM New Series
ECM 2125	2010	Jan Garbarek / The Hilliard Ensemble	Officium Novum	ECM New Series
ECM 2126	N/A	N/A	N/A	unissued
ECM 2127	2009	Sinikka Langeland	Maria's Song	
ECM 2128	2010	Paul Motian	Lost in a Dream	
ECM 2129	2009	Peter-Anthony Togni	Lamentatio Jeremiae Prophetae	ECM New Series
ECM 2130–32	2009	Keith Jarrett	Paris / London: Testament	
ECM 2133–35	2009	Eberhard Weber	Colours	3-CD boxset compiling Yellow Fields (1976), Silent Feet (1978) & Little Movements (1980)
ECM 2136–38	2012	Terje Rypdal	Odyssey – In Studio & In Concert	3-CD boxset reissuing Odyssey (1975) with unreleased live recordings
ECM 2139	2011	Michael Mantler	For Two	
ECM 2140-42	2010	Chick Corea	Solo Piano	
ECM 2143–45	2010	Arild Andersen	Green in Blue	3-CD boxset compiling Clouds in My Head (1975), Shimri (1977) & Green Shading into Blue (1978)
ECM 2146/48	2012	Jan Garbarek	Dansere	
ECM 2149	2010	Ketil Bjørnstad	Remembrance	
ECM 2150	2011	Thomas Zehetmair / Ruth Killius	Manto and Madrigals	ECM New Series
ECM 2151	2011	Stefano Battaglia Trio	The River of Anyder	
ECM 2152	2012	Miklós Perényi	Britten / Bach / Ligeti	ECM New Series
ECM 2153	2010	Juliane Banse / Aleksandar Madžar	Alban Berg / Karl Amadeus Hartmann: Tief in der Nacht	ECM New Series
ECM 2154	2011	Meredith Monk	Songs of Ascension	ECM New Series
ECM 2155	2010-05-14	Dino Saluzzi	El Encuentro	live; recorded 2009-02-12
ECM 2156	2010	Manu Katché	Third Round	
ECM 2157	2012	Garth Knox	Saltarello	ECM New Series
ECM 2158	2010	Norma Winstone	Stories Yet to Tell	
ECM 2159	2011	François Couturier	Tarkovsky Quartet	
ECM 2160	2010	Arvo Pärt	Symphony No. 4	ECM New Series
ECM 2161	2010	Gidon Kremer / Kremerata Baltica	Hymns and Prayers	ECM New Series
ECM 2162	2011	Lee Konitz / Brad Mehldau / Charlie Haden / Paul Motian	Live at Birdland	
ECM 2163	2010	Food	Quiet Inlet	
ECM 2164	2011	Cyminology	Saburi	
ECM 2165	2010	Keith Jarrett / Charlie Haden	Jasmine	
ECM 2166	2011	Trio Mediaeval	A Worcester Ladymass	ECM New Series
ECM 2167	2010	Michael Formanek	The Rub and Spare Change	
ECM 2168	2012	Marc Johnson / Eliane Elias	Swept Away	
ECM 2169	2012	Witold Lutosławski / Béla Bartók	Musique funèbre	ECM New Series
ECM 2170/71	2012	Ketil Bjørnstad	Vinding’s Music – Songs from the Alder Thicket	
ECM 2172	2011	Iro Haarla Quintet	Vespers	
ECM 2173	2010	Stephan Micus	Bold As Light	
ECM 2174	2011	Rosamunde Quartett / The Hilliard Ensemble	Boris Yoffe: Song of Songs	ECM New Series
ECM 2175	2012	The Hilliard Ensemble	Gesualdo: Quinto libro di madrigali	ECM New Series
ECM 2176	2010	Charles Lloyd Quartet	Mirror	
ECM 2177	2011	Julia Hülsmann Trio	Imprint	
ECM 2178	2010	Nik Bärtsch's Ronin	Llyrìa	
ECM 2179	2011	Nils Økland	Lysøen – Hommage à Ole Bull	
ECM 2180	2011	Amina Alaoui	Arco Iris	
ECM 2181	2012	Kayhan Kalhor / Erdal Erzincan	Kula Kulluk Yakışır Mı	
ECM 2182/83	2012	Jon Balke	Magnetic Works 1993–2001	
ECM 2184	2011	Wolfert Brederode Quartet	Post Scriptum	
ECM 2185	2011	Colin Vallon, Patrice Moret, Samuel Rohrer	Rruga	
ECM 2186	2010	Trygve Seim / Andreas Utnem	Purcor	
ECM 2187	2011	Mathias Eick	Skala	
ECM 2188	2010	Giya Kancheli	Themes from the Songbook	
ECM 2189	2014	John Holloway	Pavans and Fantasies from the Age of Dowland	ECM New Series
ECM 2190-94	2011	Gidon Kremer	Edition Lockenhaus	ECM New Series
ECM 2195/96	2013	Zehetmair Quartett	Beethoven / Bruckner / Hartmann / Holliger	ECM New Series
ECM 2197	2013	Keller Quartett	György Ligeti / Samuel Barber	ECM New Series
ECM 2198/99	2011	Keith Jarrett	Rio	

=== ECM 22xx – ===
Catalog number	Year	Artist	Title	Notes
ECM 2200	2013	Keith Jarrett / Gary Peacock / Jack DeJohnette	Somewhere	
ECM 2201	2011	Heinz Holliger	Induuchlen	ECM New Series
ECM 2202	2011	Gidon Kremer	Peter I. Tchaikovsky / Victor Kissine: Piano Trios	ECM New Series
ECM 2203	2011	Paolo Fresu / A Filetta Corsican Voices / Daniele di Bonaventura	Mistico mediterraneo	
ECM 2204	2011	Dino Saluzzi / Anja Lechner / Felix Saluzzi	Navidad de los Andes	
ECM 2205/06	2011	Charles Lloyd / Maria Farantouri	Athens Concert	
ECM 2207	2011	Craig Taborn	Avenging Angel	
ECM 2208	2011	Marcin Wasilewski Trio	Faithful	
ECM 2209	2011	Reto Bieri	Contrechant	ECM New Series
ECM 2210	2011	Sinikka Langeland Group	The Land That Is Not	
ECM 2211/12	2011	Ricardo Villalobos / Max Loderbauer	Re:ECM	
ECM 2213/14	2011	Lisa Smirnova	Georg Friedrich Händel: Die Acht Grossen Suiten	ECM New Series
ECM 2215	2012	Valery Afanassiev	Franz Schubert: Moments musicaux	ECM New Series
ECM 2216	2012	Heiner Goebbels	Stifters Dinge	ECM New Series
ECM 2217	2011	Gianluigi Trovesi / Gianni Coscia	Frère Jacques – Round about Offenbach	
ECM 2218	2011	Enrico Rava	Tribe	
ECM 2219	2013	Ensemble Belcanto / Dietburg Spohr	Hildegard von Bingen: Ordo virtutum	ECM New Series
ECM 2220	2013	Eleni Karaindrou	Concert in Athens	ECM New Series
ECM 2221	2016	Eleni Karaindrou	David	ECM New Series
ECM 2222	2011	Chick Corea / Stefano Bollani	Orvieto	
ECM 2223	2012	Carolin Widmann / Alexander Lonquich	Franz Schubert: Fantasie C-Dur; Rondo h-Moll; Sonate A-Dur	ECM New Series
ECM 2224	2015	Geneviève Strosser, Jürg Dähler, Muriel Cantoreggi, The Hilliard Ensemble	Guillaume de Machaut / Heinz Holliger: Machaut-Transkriptionen	ECM New Series
ECM 2225	2012	Arvo Pärt	Adam's Lament	ECM New Series
ECM 2226	2011	Giovanna Pessi / Susanna Wallumrød	If Grief Could Wait	
ECM 2227	2012	Arianna Savall / Petter Udland Johansen	Hirundo Maris	ECM New Series
ECM 2228	2011	Marilyn Mazur, Josefine Cronholm, John Taylor, Anders Jormin	Celestial Circle	
ECM 2229	2011	Heinz Holliger, Erich Höbarth, Camerata Bern	Johann Sebastian Bach: Ich hatte viel Bekümmernis – Konzerte und Sinfonien für Oboe	ECM New Series
ECM 2230/31	2013	Keith Jarrett / Michelle Makarski	Johann Sebastian Bach: Six Sonatas for Violin and Piano	ECM New Series
ECM 2232	2012	Anders Jormin	Ad Lucem	
ECM 2233	2012	Bobo Stenson Trio	Indicum	
ECM 2234	2012	Tim Berne	Snakeoil	
ECM 2235	2012	Fly	Year of the Snake	Fly consists of Mark Turner, Larry Grenadier, Jeff Ballard
ECM 2236	2011	The Gurdjieff Folk Instrument Ensemble & Levon Eskenia	Music of Georges I. Gurdjieff	
ECM 2237	2012	Tord Gustavsen	The Well	
ECM 2238	2011	Duo Gazzana	Five Pieces	ECM New Series
ECM 2239	2013	Dobrinka Tabakova	String Paths	ECM New Series
ECM 2240	2012	Kim Kashkashian / Kurtág / Ligeti	Music for Viola	ECM New Series
ECM 2241/42	2012	Alexei Lubimov	Claude Debussy: Préludes	ECM New Series
ECM 2243	2014	Helena Tulve	Arboles Iloran por lluvia	ECM New Series
ECM 2244	2012	Vox Clamantis, Jaan-Eik Tulve	Filia Sion	ECM New Series
ECM 2245	2011	Jon Balke / Batagraf	Say and Play	
ECM 2246	2012	José Luis Montón	Solo Guitarra	
ECM 2247	2012	Dénes Várjon / Precipitando	Alban Berg / Leoš Janáček / Franz Liszt	ECM New Series
ECM 2248	2012	Billy Hart, Ethan Iverson, Mark Turner, Ben Street	All Our Reasons	
ECM 2249	2023-9	John Holloway Ensemble	Henry Purcell: Fantazias	ECM New Series. Recorded March 2015, Radiostudio DRS, Zürich
ECM 2250	2011	Various Artists	Sounds and Silence, Music for the Film	
ECM 2251	2012	Benedikt Jahnel Trio	Equilibrium	
ECM 2252	2012	Andy Sheppard / Michael Benita / Sebastian Rochford	Trio Libero	
ECM 2253	2014	Lisa Batiashvili, Adrian Brendel, Till Felder, Amy Freston, Roderick Williams	Harrison Birtwistle: Chamber Music	ECM New Series
ECM 2254	2012	John Abercrombie Quartet	Within a Song	
ECM 2255	2012	Anna Gourari	Canto Oscuro	ECM New Series
ECM 2256	2012	Sofia Gubaidulina	The Canticle of the Sun	ECM New Series
ECM 2257	2012	Steve Kuhn / Steve Swallow / Joey Baron	Wisteria	
ECM 2258	2013	Chris Potter	The Sirens	
ECM 2259	2012	Arild Andersen	Celebration	
ECM 2260-65	2013	Paul Motian	Paul Motian: Old & New Masters Edition	6-CD boxset compiling Conception Vessel (1973), Tribute (1974), Dance (1978), Le voyage (1979), Psalm (1982) & It Should've Happened a Long Time Ago (1985)
ECM 2266	2012	John Surman	Saltash Bells	
ECM 2267	2012	Michael Formanek	Small Places	
ECM 2268	2012	John Cage	As It Is	ECM New Series
ECM 2269	2012	Food	Mercurial Balm	
ECM 2270-73	2012	András Schiff	Das Wohltemperierte Clavier	ECM New Series
ECM 2274	2013	Giovanni Guidi Trio	City of Broken Dreams	
ECM 2275	2013	Iva Bittová	Iva Bittová	
ECM 2276	2013	June Tabor / Iain Ballamy / Huw Warren	Quercus	
ECM 2277	2012	Elina Duni Quartet	Matanë Malit	
ECM 2278	2012	Dans les arbres	Canopée	
ECM 2279	2012	Valentin Silvestrov	Sacred Songs	ECM New Series
ECM 2280/81	2012	Jan Garbarek / Egberto Gismonti / Charlie Haden	Magico: Carta de Amor	
ECM 2282	2012	Louis Sclavis Atlas Trio	Sources	
ECM 2283	2013	Morton Feldman	Violin and Orchestra	ECM New Series
ECM 2284	2012	Manu Katché	Manu Katché	
ECM 2285	2012	Christian Reiner	Friedrich Hölderlin: Turmgedichte	ECM New Series
ECM 2286	2013	Stefano Battaglia Trio	Songways	
ECM 2287	2013	Carla Bley / Andy Sheppard / Steve Swallow	Trios	
ECM 2288	2016	Rolf Lislevand	La Mascarade	ECM New Series
ECM 2289	2012	Christian Wallumrød Ensemble	Outstairs	
ECM 2290/91	2012	Keith Jarrett / Jan Garbarek / Palle Danielsson / Jon Christensen	Sleeper	Belonging trio live in Tokyo 1979
ECM 2292	2013	Marilyn Crispell / Gary Peacock	Azure	
ECM 2293	2012	Enrico Rava	Rava on the Dance Floor	
ECM 2294/95	2013	Andras Schiff	Ludwig van Beethoven: Diabelli-Variationen	ECM New Series
ECM 2296–99	2012	Jack DeJohnette	Special Edition	4-CD boxset compiling Special Edition (1980), Tin Can Alley (1981), Inflation Blues (1983) & Album Album (1984)

=== ECM 23xx – ===
Catalog number	Year	Artist	Title	Notes
ECM 2300	2013	Ketil Bjørnstad	La notte	
ECM 2301	2012	Eivind Aarset	Dream Logic	
ECM 2302/03	2012	Nik Bärtsch	Nik Bärtsch's Ronin Live	
ECM 2304/05	2013	Tomasz Stańko New York Quartet	Wisława	
ECM 2306	2013	Julia Hülsmann Quartet	In Full View	
ECM 2307	2014	Arild Andersen / Paolo Vinaccia / Tommy Smith	Mira	
ECM 2308	2013	Stephan Micus	Panagia	
ECM 2309	2014	Loren Ramou, Ensemble Coriolis	Konstantin Gourzi: Music for piano and string quartet	ECM New Series
ECM 2310	2013	Ralph Towner / Wolfgang Muthspiel / Slava Grigoryan	Travel Guide	
ECM 2311	2013	Charles Lloyd / Jason Moran	Hagar's Song	
ECM 2312	2013	Victor Kissine	Between Two Waves	ECM New Series
ECM 2313	2013	Lucian Ban / Mat Maneri	Transylvanian Concert	
ECM 2314	2013	Nicolas Masson / Roberto Pianca / Emanuele Maniscalco	Third Reel	
ECM 2315	2014	Benedicte Maurseth / Åsne Valland Nordli	Over Tones	
ECM 2316-20	2013	Charles Lloyd	Quartets	5-CD boxset compiling Fish Out of Water (1990), Notes from Big Sur (1992), The Call (1993), All My Relations (1995) & Canto (1997)
ECM 2321	2013	Ralph Alessi	Baida	
ECM 2322	2013	Susanne Abbuehl	The Gift	
ECM 2323	2014	Tigran Mansurian	Quasi parlando	ECM New Series
ECM 2324	2015	Keller Quartett	Cantante e tranquillo	ECM New Series
ECM 2326	2013	Craig Taborn Trio	Chants	
ECM 2327	2016	Tõnu Kõrvits	Mirror	ECM New Series
ECM 2328	2013	Zsófia Boros	En otra parte	ECM New Series
ECM 2329	2014	Patricia Kopatchinskaja, Markus Hinterhauser, Reto Bieri	Galina Ustvolskaya	ECM New Series
ECM 2330/31	2013	Marc Sinan	Hasretim – Journey to Anatolia	CD & DVD
ECM 2332	2013	Stefano Bollani / Hamilton de Holanda	O que será	
ECM 2333	2014	Norma Winstone	Dance without Answer	
ECM 2334	2013	John Abercrombie Quartet	39 Steps	
ECM 2335	2014	Billy Hart Quartet	One Is the Other	
ECM 2336	2013	Ketil Bjørnstad	Sunrise – A cantata on texts by Edvard Munch	
ECM 2337	2013	Yeahwon Shin / Aaron Parks / Rob Curto	Lua ya	
ECM 2338	2013	Aaron Parks	Arborescence	
ECM 2339	2013	Tim Berne's Snakeoil	Shadow Man	
ECM 2340	2013	Maria Pia De Vito	Il Pergolese	
ECM 2341	2014	Erkki-Sven Tüür	Symphony No.7 / Piano Concerto	ECM New Series
ECM 2342	2013	Myung Whun Chung	Myung Whun Chung Piano	ECM New Series
ECM 2343	2014	Momo Kodama	La vallée des cloches	ECM New Series
ECM 2344	2014	Saskia Lankhoom	Kate Moore: Dances and Canons	ECM New Series
ECM 2345	2014	Kim Kashkashian, Sivan Magen, Marina Piccinini	Tre Voci	ECM New Series
ECM 2346	2013	The Hilliard Ensemble	Il cor tristo	ECM New Series
ECM 2347	2014	Colin Vallon Trio	Le vent	
ECM 2348	2014	Jean Louis Matinier / Marco Ambrosini	Inventio	
ECM 2349	2014	Wolfgang Muthspiel / Larry Grenadier / Brian Blade	Driftwood	
ECM 2350-55	2013	Various artists	Selected Signs, III–VIII	6-CD boxset
ECM 2356	2014	Duo Gazzana	Poulenc, Walton, Dallapiccola, Schnittke, Silvestrov	ECM New Series
ECM 2357	2014	Mark Turner	Lathe of Heaven	
ECM 2358	2014	Tord Gustavsen Quartet	Extended Circle	
ECM 2359	2022	Kiev Chamber Choir, Mykola Hobdych	Valentin Silvestrov: Maidan	
ECM 2360	2014	Stefano Bollani	Joy in Spite of Everything	
ECM 2361/62	2013	Keith Jarrett	No End	
ECM 2363	2014	Kappeler / Zumthor	Babylon-Suite	
ECM 2364	2016	Miroslav Vitous	Music of Weather Report	
ECM 2365	2013	Various artists	Re:Seoul	compilation
ECM 2366	2014	Jacob Young	Forever Young	
ECM 2367	2014	Anja Lechner / François Couturier	Moderato cantabile	ECM New Series
ECM 2368/69	2014	Gidon Kremer / Kremerata Baltica	Mieczysław Weinberg	ECM New Series
ECM 2370	2014	Dino Saluzzi Group	El valle de la infancia	
ECM 2371	2014	Vilde & Inga	Makrofauna	
ECM 2372	2014	Vijay Iyer	Mutations	
ECM 2373	2014	Paul Bley	Play Blue: Oslo Concert	
ECM 2374	2014	Meredith Monk	Piano Songs	ECM New Series
ECM 2375	2016	Kim Kashkashian, Lera Auerbach	Arcanum – Dmitri Shostakovich, Lera Auerbach	ECM New Series
ECM 2376	2014	Eleni Karaindrou	Medea	
ECM 2377	2015	Sinikka Langeland	The half-finished heaven	
ECM 2378	2015	Kim Kashkashian, Sarah Rothenberg, Steven Schick, Houston Chamber Choir, Robert Simpson	Morton Feldman, Erik Satie, John Cage: Rothko Chapel	ECM New Series
ECM 2379	2015	Dino Saluzzi	Imágenes – Music for piano	ECM New Series
ECM 2380	2015	Pablo Marquez	Gustavo Leguizamon: El cuchi bien-temperado	ECM New Series
ECM 2381	2015	Jakob Bro	Gefion	Recorded November 2013, Rainbow Studio, Oslo
ECM 2382	2016	Anat Fort Trio, Gianluigi Trovesi	Birdwatching	
ECM 2383	2015	Nils Økland BA	Kjølvatn	
ECM 2384	2014	Anna Gourari	Visions fugitives	ECM New Series
ECM 2385	2016	Glauco Venier	Miniatures	
ECM 2386	2014	David Virelles	Mbókò	
ECM 2387	2015	Chris Potter Underground Orchestra	Imaginary Cities	
ECM 2388	2015	Kenny Wheeler	Songs for Quintet	
ECM 2389	2017	Anja Lechner, Agnès Vesterman	Valentin Silvestrov: Hieroglyphen der Nacht	ECM New Series
ECM 2390	2023	Gianluigi Trovesi / Stefano Montanari	Stravaganze Consonanti	
ECM 2391	2014	Michael Mantler	The Jazz Composer’s Orchestra Update	
ECM 2392	2015	Jack DeJohnette	Made in Chicago	
ECM 2393	2014	Robin Williamson	Trusting in the Rising Light	
ECM 2394	2014	Ketil Bjørnstad	A passion for John Donne	
ECM 2395	2014	Heinz Holliger / Robert Schumann	Aschenmusik	ECM New Series
ECM 2396	2016	Thomas Zehetmair, Orchestre de chambre de Paris	Robert Schumann	ECM New Series
ECM 2397	2015	Cyminology	Phoenix	
ECM 2398	2015	Savina Yannatou / Primavera en Salonico	Songs of Thessaloniki	
ECM 2399	2014	Keith Jarrett / Charlie Haden	Last Dance	
ECM 2400	2014	Marcin Wasilewski Trio w/ Joakim Milder	Spark of Life	

=== ECM 24xx – ===
Catalog number	Year	Artist	Title	Notes
ECM 2401	2015	Elina Duni Quartet	Dallëndyshe	
ECM 2402	2014	Louis Sclavis Quartet	Silk and Salt Melodies	
ECM 2403	2015	Giovanni Guidi Trio	This Is the Day	
ECM 2404	2015	Wolfgang Rihm	Et lux	ECM New Series
ECM 2405	2016	Gavin Bryars	The Fifth Century	ECM New Series
ECM 2406	2015	Anders Jormin with Lena Willemark and Karin Nakagawa	Trees of Light	
ECM 2407	2014	Sokratis Sinopoulos Quartet	Eight Winds	
ECM 2408	2014	The Hilliard Ensemble	Transeamus	ECM New Series
ECM 2409	2015	Stephan Micus	Nomad Songs	
ECM 2410	2015	Mathias Eick	Midwest	
ECM 2411	2015	Dominique Pifarély	Time Before and Time After	
ECM 2412	2015	Paolo Fresu with Daniele di Bonaventura	In maggiore	
ECM 2413	2014	JøKleBa	Outland	
ECM 2414/15	2016	Tigran Hamasyan, Arve Henriksen, Eivind Aarset and Jan Bang	Atmosphères	
ECM 2416	2014	Trio Mediæval	Aquilonis	ECM New Series
ECM 2417	2015	Food	This Is Not a Miracle	
ECM 2418	2015	Julia Hülsmann Quartet	A Clear Midnight – Kurt Weill and America	
ECM 2419	2014	Manu Katché	Touchstone for Manu	
ECM 2420	2015	Vijay Iyer Trio	Break Stuff	
ECM 2421	2016	Ben Monder	Amorphae	
ECM 2422	2014	Keith Jarrett Trio	Hamburg '72	
ECM 2423/24	2014	Anouar Brahem	Souvenance	
ECM 2425/26	2014	András Schiff	Franz Schubert	ECM New Series
ECM 2427	2016	Carolin Widmann, Chamber Orchestra of Europe	Felix Mendelssohn Bartholdy / Robert Schumann	ECM New Series
ECM 2428	2015	Gary Peacock Trio	Now This	
ECM 2429	2015	Stefano Battaglia Trio	In the Morning	
ECM 2430	2016	Andrew Cyrille Quartet	The Declaration of Musical Independence	
ECM 2431	2015	Third Reel	Many More Days	
ECM 2432	2015	Andy Sheppard Quartet	Surrounded by Sea	
ECM 2433	2015	David Torn	Only Sky	
ECM 2434	2014	Lumen Drones	Lumen Drones	
ECM 2435	2014	Burkhard Reinartz	Eine Olive des Nichts	ECM New Series
ECM 2436	2018	Oleg Malov, Tatiana Melentieva, Piotr Migunov, Lege Artis Choir	Alexander Knaifel: Lukomoriye	ECM New Series
ECM 2438	2016	Ralph Alessi	Quiver	
ECM 2439	2015	Eberhard Weber	Encore	
ECM 2440	2018	Ketil Bjørnstad + Anneli Drecker	A Suite of Poems	
ECM 2441	2015	John Potter	Amores pasados	ECM New Series
ECM 2442	2015	Gideon Kremer, Patricia Kopatchinskaja, Kremerata Baltica	Giya Kancheli: Chiaroscuro	ECM New Series
ECM 2443	2015	Tim Berne’s Snakeoil	You've Been Watching Me	
ECM 2444	2016	Jon Balke	Warp	
ECM 2445	2015	Keith Jarrett	Barber/Bartók	ECM New Series
ECM 2446	2016	Miranda Cuckson, Blair McMillen	Bela Bartok, Alfred Schnittke, Witold Lutoslawski	ECM New Series
ECM 2447	2015	Tigran Hamasyan	Luys i Luso	
ECM 2448	2016	Sinikka Langeland, Arve Henriksen, Trygve Seim, Anders Jormin, Markku Ounaskari, Trio Mediaeval	The Magical Forest	
ECM 2449	2016	Trygve Seim, Tora Augestad, Frode Haltli, Svante Henryson	Rumi Songs	
ECM 2450	2015	Keith Jarrett	Creation	
ECM 2451	2015	The Gurdjieff Folk Instrument Ensemble & Levon Eskenian	Komitas	
ECM 2452	2015	Erkki-Sven Tüür and Brett Dean	Gesualdo	ECM New Series
ECM 2453	2016	Danish String Quartet	Thomas Adès, Per Nørgård, Hans Abrahamsen	ECM New Series
ECM 2454/55	2015	Arvo Pärt	Musica Selecta	ECM New Series
ECM 2456	2015	Enrico Rava Quartet with Gianluca Petrella	Wild Dance	
ECM 2457	2016	Iro Haarla Quintet, Norrlands Operans Symfoniorkester, Jukka Iisakkila	Ante lucem	
ECM 2458	2016	Ferenc Snétberger	In Concert	
ECM 2459	2016	Masabumi Kikuchi	Black Orpheus	
ECM 2460/61	2015	Mette Henriette	Mette Henriette	
ECM 2462	2016	Giovanni Guidi, Gianluca Petrella, Louis Sclavis, Gerald Cleaver	Ida Lupino	
ECM 2463	2015	Pat Metheny & SWR Big Band	Hommage à Eberhard Weber	
ECM 2464	2016	Nik Bärtsch's Mobile	Continuum	
ECM 2465	2016	Tord Gustavsen	What Was Said	
ECM 2466	2016	Vox Clamantis	The Deer's Cry	ECM New Series
ECM 2467	2015	Thomas Strønen	Time Is a Blind Guide	
ECM 2468	2017	Ferenc Snétberger, Anders Jormin, Joey Baron	Titok	
ECM 2469	2016	Mats Eilertsen	Rubicon	
ECM 2470-72	2015	Anthony de Mare	Liaisons: Re-Imagining Sondheim from the Piano	ECM New Series
ECM 2473	2016	Meredith Monk Ensemble	On Behalf of Nature	ECM New Series
ECM 2474	2016	Ches Smith	The Bell	
ECM 2475	2016	Golfam Khayam, Mona Matbou Riahi	Narrante	
ECM 2476	2016	Wolfert Brederode Trio	Black Ice	
ECM 2477	2016	Markus Stockhausen, Florian Weber	Alba	
ECM 2478–80	2015	John Abercrombie	The First Quartet	3-CD boxset compiling Arcade (1979), Abercrombie Quartet (1980) & M (1981)
ECM 2481	2016	Dominique Pifarély Quartet	Tracé provisoire	
ECM 2482	2016	Avishai Cohen	Into the Silence	
ECM 2483	2016	Michel Benita, Ethics	River Silver	
ECM 2484	2016	Michael Formanek, Ensemble Kolossus	The Distance	
ECM 2485	2017	Orchestra della Svizzera italiana, Dennis Russell Davies	Now, and Then	ECM New Series
ECM 2486	2016	Vijay Iyer / Wadada Leo Smith	A Cosmic Rhythm with Each Stroke	
ECM 2487	2016	Carla Bley, Andy Sheppard, Steve Swallow	Andando el tiempo	
ECM 2488	2016	Jack DeJohnette, Ravi Coltrane, Matthew Garrison	In Movement	
ECM 2489	2017	Aaron Parks, Ben Street, Billy Hart	Find the Way	
ECM 2490-93	2016	Peter Erskine, John Taylor, Palle Danielsson	As It Was	4-CD boxset compiling You Never Know (1993), Time Being (1994), As It Is (1996) & Juni (1999)
ECM 2494/95	2017	Roscoe Mitchell	Bells for the South Side	
ECM 2496	2016	Frode Haltli, Arditti Quartet, Trondheim Soloists	Air – Bent Sørensen, Hans Abrahamsen	ECM New Series
ECM 2497	2019	Marco Ambrosini, Ensemble Supersonus	Resonances	
ECM 2498	2016	Zsófia Boros	Local Objects	ECM New Series
ECM 2499	2016	Jakob Bro, Thomas Morgan, Joey Baron	Streams	Recorded November 2015, Studios La Buissonne, Pernes les Fontaines

=== ECM 25xx – ===
Catalog number	Year	Artist	Title	Notes
ECM 2500-03	2016	Keith Jarrett	A Multitude of Angels	
ECM 2504	2017	Louis Sclavis, Dominique Pifarély, Vincent Courtois	Asian Fields Variations	
ECM 2505–07	2017	Reinbert de Leeuw, Asko/Schönberg, Netherlands Radio Choir	György Kurtág: Complete Works for Ensemble and Choir	ECM New Series
ECM 2508	2017	RIAS Kammerchor, Münchener Kammerorchester, Alexander Liebreich	Tigran Mansurian: Requiem	ECM New Series
ECM 2509	2017	Momo Kodama	Point and Line	ECM New Series
ECM 2510	2017	Yuuko Shiokawa, András Schiff	Bach / Busoni / Beethoven	ECM New Series
ECM 2511	2018	Till Fellner	In Concert – Beethoven / Liszt	ECM New Series; live
ECM 2512	2017	Theo Bleckmann	Elegy	
ECM 2513	2017	Christian Reiner	Joseph Brodsky: Elegie an John Donne	ECM New Series
ECM 2514	2017	Lusine Grigoryan	Komitas: Piano Compositions	ECM New Series
ECM 2515	2016	Wolfgang Muthspiel	Rising Grace	
ECM 2516	2017	Ralph Towner	My Foolish Heart	
ECM 2517	2017	Colin Vallon Trio	Danse	
ECM 2518	2017	Dominic Miller	Silent Light	
ECM 2519	2017	Chris Potter	The Dreamer Is the Dream	
ECM 2520	2017	Trio Mediaeval, Arve Henriksen	Rímur	
ECM 2521	2018	Dénes Várjon	De la nuit	ECM New Series
ECM 2522	2017	Quercus	Nightfall	
ECM 2523	2017	Benedikt Jahnel Trio	The Invariant	
ECM 2524	2017	Tarkovsky Quartet	Nuit blanche	
ECM 2525	2017	Bill Frisell, Thomas Morgan	Small Town	
ECM 2526	2017	David Virelles	Gnosis	
ECM 2527	2017	Craig Taborn	Daylight Ghosts	
ECM 2528	2017	John Abercrombie Quartet	Up and Coming	
ECM 2530/31	2017	Thomas Demenga	J.S. Bach – Suiten für Violoncello	ECM New Series
ECM 2532	2017	Tomasz Stańko New York Quartet	December Avenue	
ECM 2533	2017	Gary Peacock Trio	Tangents	
ECM 2534	2017	Django Bates' Belovèd	The Study of Touch	
ECM 2535/36	2019	András Schiff	Franz Schubert – Sonatas & Impromptus	ECM New Series
ECM 2537	2017	Michael Mantler	Comment C'est	
ECM 2538/39	2017	Kremerata Baltica, Gidon Kremer	Mieczysław Weinberg: Chamber Symphonies & Piano Quintet	ECM New Series
ECM 2540-42	2016	Steve Reich Ensemble	The ECM Recordings	ECM New Series
ECM 2543	2024-11	Jakob Bro, Lee Konitz, Bill Frisell, Jason Moran, Thomas Morgan, Andrew Cyrille	Taking Turns	Recorded March 2014, Avatar Studios, New York
ECM 2544	2025-09	John Taylor, Marc Johnson, Joey Baron	Tramonto	Recorded January 2002, CBSO Centre, Birmingham
ECM 2545	2021-4	Nils Mönkemeyer, William Youn, Lucerne Academy Orchestra, Minguet Quartett	Konstantia Gourzi – Anájikon	Recorded August 2016 / March 2018
ECM 2546	2018-03	Jakob Bro, Palle Mikkelborg, Thomas Morgan, Jon Christensen	Returnings	Recorded July 2016, Rainbow Studio, Oslo
ECM 2547	2017	Julia Hülsmann Trio	Sooner and Later	
ECM 2548	2017	Avishai Cohen	Cross My Palm with Silver	
ECM 2549	2019	Areni Agbabian	Bloom	
ECM 2550	2017	Danish String Quartet	Last Leaf	ECM New Series
ECM 2551	2019	Thomas Zehetmair	Sei Solo – J.S. Bach: The Sonatas and Partitas for Violin Solo	ECM New Series
ECM 2553/54	2018	Kim Kashkashian	Six Suites for Viola Solo	ECM New Series
ECM 2555	2018	Anja Lechner / Pablo Márquez	Franz Schubert: Die Nacht	ECM New Series
ECM 2556	2018	Duo Gazzana	Ravel, Franck, Ligeti, Messiaen	ECM New Series
ECM 2557	2019	Reto Bieri and Meta 4	Quasi morendo	ECM New Series
ECM 2558	2018	Marc Sinan, Oğuz Büyükberber	White	
ECM 2559	2018	Kit Downes	Obsidian	
ECM 2560	2019	Larry Grenadier	The Gleaners	
ECM 2561	2018	Danish String Quartet	Prism I – Beethoven, Shostakovich, Bach	ECM New Series
ECM 2562	2019	Danish String Quartet	Prism II – Beethoven, Schnittke, Bach	ECM New Series
ECM 2563	2021	Danish String Quartet	Prism III – Beethoven, Bartók, Bach	ECM New Series
ECM 2564	2022	Danish String Quartet	Prism IV – Beethoven, Mendelssohn, Bach	ECM New Series
ECM 2565	2023	Danish String Quartet	Prism V – Beethoven, Webern, Bach	ECM New Series
ECM 2566	2017	Björn Meyer	Provenance	
ECM 2567	2018	Norma Winstone	Descansado – Songs for Film	
ECM 2568	2018	Sungjae Son (Yulhee Kim, Suwuk Chung, Soojin Suh)	Near East Quartet	
ECM 2569	2017	Stephan Micus	Inland Sea	
ECM 2570/71	2017	Stefano Battaglia	Pelagos	
ECM 2572	2017	Jon Balke, Siwan	Nahnou Houm	
ECM 2573	2017	Maciej Obara Quartet	Unloved	
ECM 2574	2018	Shinya Fukumori Trio	For 2 Akis	
ECM 2575	2018	Barre Phillips	End to End	
ECM 2576	2018	Thomas Strønen, Time Is a Blind Guide	Lucus	
ECM 2577	2018	Andy Sheppard Quartet	Romaria	
ECM 2578	2018	Nicolas Masson, Colin Vallon, Patrice Moret, Lionel Friedli	Travelers	
ECM 2579	2017	Tim Berne’s Snakeoil	Incidentals	
ECM 2580	2017	Anouar Brahem	Blue Maqams	
ECM 2581	2017	Vijay Iyer Sextet	Far from Over	
ECM 2582	2018	Bobo Stenson Trio	Contra la Indecisión	
ECM 2583	2018	Mark Turner, Ethan Iverson	Temporary Kings	
ECM 2584	2018	Mathias Eick	Ravensburg	
ECM 2585	2019	Maria Farantouri, Cihan Türkoğlu	Beyond the Borders	
ECM 2586	2018	Kristjan Randalu, Ben Monder, Markku Ounaskari	Absence	
ECM 2587	2018	Elina Duni	Partir	
ECM 2588	2018	John Surman	Invisible Threads	
ECM 2589	2018	Andrew Cyrille, Wadada Leo Smith, Bill Frisell	Lebroba	
ECM 2590/91	2018	Keith Jarrett, Gary Peacock, Jack DeJohnette	After the Fall	
ECM 2592	2018	Marcin Wasilewski Trio	Live	
ECM 2593	2018	Florian Weber (Ralph Alessi, Linda May Han Oh, Nasheet Waits)	Lucent Waters	
ECM 2594	2018	Arild Andersen	In-House Science	
ECM 2595	2023	Ruth Killius, Thomas Zehetmair, Royal Northern Sinfonia	Bartók, Casken, Beethoven	ECM New Series
ECM 2597	2021	Camerata Zürich, Igor Karsko, Maïa Brami	On an overgrown path	
ECM 2598	2018	Stefano Scodanibbio (Daniele Roccato, Ludus Gravis Ensemble)	Alisei	ECM New Series
ECM 2599	2018	Steve Tibbetts	Life Of	

=== ECM 26xx – ===
Catalog number	Year	Artist	Title	Notes
ECM 2600	2018-04	NFM Wrocław Philharmonic, Tõnu Kaljuste	Arvo Pärt: The Symphonies	ECM New Series
ECM 2601/02	2018-10	Keith Jarrett	La Fenice	
ECM 2603	2018-05	Nik Bärtsch’s Ronin	Awase	
ECM 2604	2019-03	Giovanni Guidi	Avec le temps	
ECM 2605/06	2018-10	Philharmonisches Staatsorchester Hamburg, Kent Nagano	Arche	ECM New Series
ECM 2607	2018-08	Trygve Seim	Helsinki Songs	
ECM 2608	2018-08	Tord Gustavsen Trio	The Other Side	
ECM 2609	2019-05	Michele Rabbia, Gianluca Petrella, Eivind Aarset	Lost River	
ECM 2610	2018-10	Wolfgang Muthspiel, Ambrose Akinmusire, Brad Mehldau, Larry Grenadier, Eric Harland	Where the River Goes	
ECM 2611	2019-01	Yonathan Avishai	Joys and Solitudes	
ECM 2612	2019-05	Anna Gourari	Elusive Affinity	ECM New Series
ECM 2613	2019-03	David Torn, Tim Berne, Ches Smith	Sun of Goldfinger	
ECM 2614	2019-03	Dominic Miller	Absinthe	
ECM 2615	2019-01	Joe Lovano	Trio Tapestry	Recorded March 2018, Sear Sound, New York
ECM 2616	2018-09	Shai Maestro (Jorge Roeder, Ofri Nehemya)	The Dream Thief	
ECM 2617	2020-05	Jean-Louis Matinier, Kevin Seddiki	Rivages	Recorded April 2018, Auditorio Stelio Molo RSI, Lugano
ECM 2618	2018-10	Jakob Bro (Thomas Morgan, Joey Baron)	Bay of Rainbows	Recorded July 2017, Jazz Standard, New York
ECM 2619	2019-02	Mats Eilertsen Trio	And Then Comes the Night	Recorded May 2018, Auditorio Stelio Molo RSI, Lugano
ECM 2620	2020-05	Vox Clamantis, Jaan-Eik Tulve	Cyrillus Kreek – The Suspended Harp of Babel	
ECM 2621	2020-10	András Schiff, Jörg Widmann	Clarinet Sonatas	
ECM 2622/23	2022-04	Christian Gerhaher, Juliane Banse, Ivan Ludlow, Sarah Maria Sun, Annette Schönmüller, Philharmonia Zürich, Basler Madrigalisten, Heinz Holliger	Lunea	ECM New Series
ECM 2624	2021-03	Momo Kodama, Seiji Ozawa, Mito Chamber Orchestra	Hosokawa / Mozart	ECM New Series
ECM 2625	2019-10	Jan Garbarek, The Hilliard Ensemble	Remember me, my dear	
ECM 2626	2019-04	Bill Frisell & Thomas Morgan	Epistrophy	
ECM 2627/28	2019-06	Keith Jarrett	The Well-Tempered Clavier Book I	ECM New Series
ECM 2629	2019-02	Ralph Alessi	Imaginary Friends	
ECM 2630	2018-10	Art Ensemble of Chicago	The Art Ensemble of Chicago and Associated Ensembles	21-CD boxset
ECM 2631	2019-03	Sokratis Sinopoulos Quartet	Metamodal	
ECM 2632	2019-10	Kit Downes	Dreamlife of Debris	
ECM 2633	2021-04	Thomas Strønen, Marthe Lea, Ayumi Tanaka	Bayou	
ECM 2634	2019-11	Eleni Karaindrou	Tous des oiseaux	ECM New Series
ECM 2635/36	2023-01	András Schiff	J.S. Bach: Clavichord	ECM New Series
ECM 2637	2025-03	Patrick Demenga The State Choir Latvija, Riga Cathedral Boys Choir, Youth Choir Kamēr, Andres Mustonen	Alexander Knaifel: Chapter Eight	Recorded March 2009, Jesuitenkirche Luzern
ECM 2638	2020-11	Dino Saluzzi	Albores	
ECM 2639	2019-04	Stephan Micus	White Night	
ECM 2640	2021-10	Fred Thomas, Aisha Orazbayeva, Lucy Railton	Three or One	
ECM 2641	2019-09	Avishai Cohen & Yonathan Avishai	Playing the Room	
ECM 2642	2019-05	Paul Bley, Gary Peacock, Paul Motian	When Will the Blues Leave	
ECM 2643	2019-09	Ethan Iverson Quartet with Tom Harrell	Common Practice	
ECM 2644	2019-03	Vijay Iyer & Craig Taborn	The Transitory Poems	
ECM 2645	2019-09	Louis Sclavis Quartet	Characters on a Wall	
ECM 2646	N/A	N/A	N/A	unissued
ECM 2647	N/A	N/A	N/A	unissued
ECM 2648	2020-05	Jon Balke	Discourses	
ECM 2649	2021-10	Parker Quartet, Kim Kashkashian	György Kurtág: Moments Musicaux & Officium breve / Antonín Dvorák: String Quintet op. 97	
ECM 2650	2024-06	Tomasz Stanko Quartet	September Night	Recorded September 2004, Muffathalle, Munich
ECM 2651	N/A	N/A	N/A	unissued
ECM 2652	2019-06	Gianluigi Trovesi, Gianni Coscia	La misteriosa musica della Regina Loana	
ECM 2653	2021-02	Ferenc Snétberger, Keller Quartett	Hallgató	
ECM 2654	2019-09	Enrico Rava and Joe Lovano	Roma	
ECM 2655	2020-03	Wolfgang Muthspiel, Scott Colley, Brian Blade	Angular Blues	
ECM 2656/57	2022-07	Steve Tibbetts	Hellbound Train – An Anthology	
ECM 2658	2020-09	Terje Rypdal	Conspiracy	
ECM 2659	2020-05	Benjamin Moussay	Promontoire	
ECM 2660	2021-09	Mathias Eick	When We Leave	
ECM 2661	2021-11	Jorge Rossy, Robert Landfermann, Jeff Ballard	Puerta	
ECM 2662	2019-10	Maciej Obara Quartet	Three Crowns	
ECM 2663	2020-09	Michel Benita Quartet	Looking at Sounds	
ECM 2664	2019-11	Julia Hülsmann Quartet	Not Far from Here	
ECM 2665	2019-05	Heinz Holliger & György Kurtág	Zwiegespräche	ECM New Series
ECM 2666	2020-11	Erkki-Sven Tüür	Lost Prayers	
ECM 2667/68	2019-11	Keith Jarrett	Munich 2016	live
ECM 2669	2020-02	Carla Bley, Andy Sheppard, Steve Swallow	Life Goes On	
ECM 2670	2025-09	Maxim Rysanov, Dasol Kim, Roman Mints, Kristina Blaumane, BBC Concert Orchestra	Dobrinka Tabakova: Sun Triptych	Recorded August 2020 & July 2021
ECM 2671	2021-08	Marc Johnson	Overpass	
ECM 2672	2021-10	Enrico Rava	Edizione speciale	
ECM 2673	2026-03	Miroslav Vitous, Michel Portal, Jack DeJohnette	Mountain Call	Recorded 2003-2010, Universal Syncopations Studios, Clavesana
ECM 2674	2021-04	Sinikka Langeland	Wolf Rune	
ECM 2675	2021-10	Ayumi Tanaka Trio	Subaqueous Silence	
ECM 2676	2020-02	Oded Tzur	Here Be Dragons	
ECM 2677	2021-09	Marcin Wasilewski Trio	En attendant	
ECM 2678	2020-06	Marcin Wasilewski Trio, Joe Lovano	Arctic Riff	
ECM 2679	2020-06	John Scofield, Steve Swallow, Bill Stewart	Swallow Tales	
ECM 2680	2020-03	Avishai Cohen	Big Vicious	
ECM 2681	2021-08	Andrew Cyrille Quartet	The News	
ECM 2682	2020-10	Anja Lechner, François Couturier	Lontano	
ECM 2683	2020-09	Matthieu Bordenave	La traversée	
ECM 2684	2022-03	Mark Turner, Jason Palmer, Joe Martin, Jonathan Pinson	Return from the Stars	
ECM 2685	2021-09	Joe Lovano, Marilyn Crispell, Carmen Castaldi	Garden of Expression	
ECM 2686	2020-09	Dominik Wania	Lonely Shadows	
ECM 2687	2020-11	Kim Kashkashian, Movses Pogossian, Varty Manouelian	Con anima	
ECM 2688	2021-01	Shai Maestro, Jorge Roeder, Ofri Nehemya, Philip Dizack	Human	
ECM 2689	2020-11	Elina Duni, Rob Luft, Fred Thomas, Matthieu Michel	Lost Ships	
ECM 2690/91	2021-06	András Schiff, Orchestra of the Age of Enlightenment	Johannes Brahms – Piano Concertos	
ECM 2692	2021-04	Vijay Iyer, Linda May Han Oh, Tyshawn Sorey	Uneasy	
ECM 2693	2021-10	Craig Taborn	Shadow Plays	
ECM 2694	2023-09	Heinz Holliger, Anton Kernjak	Éventail	ECM New Series. Recorded October 2021, Radio Studio DRS, Zürich
ECM 2695	N/A	N/A	N/A	unissued
ECM 2696	2021-04	Cymin Samawatie, Ketan Bhatti	Trickster Orchestra	Recorded January 2019, Meistersaal, Berlin
ECM 2697	2021-07	Michael Mantler	Coda – Orchestra Suites	
ECM 2698	2021-06	Stephan Micus	Winter’s End	
ECM 2699	2021-11	Eberhard Weber	Once upon a Time (Live in Avignon)	Recorded live August 1994, Théatre des Halles, Avignon

=== ECM 27xx – ===
Catalog number	Date released	Artist	Title	Notes
ECM 2700/01	2020-10	Keith Jarrett	Budapest Concert	Recorded live July 2016, Béla Bartók Concert Hall, Budapest
ECM 2702	2021-02	Jakob Bro, Arve Henriksen, Jorge Rossy	Uma Elmo	Recorded August–September 2020, Auditorio Stelio Molo RSI, Lugano
ECM 2703	2021-03	Nik Bärtsch	Entendre	
ECM 2704	2023-04	Dominic Miller	Vagabond	Recorded April 2021, Studios La Buissonne, Pernes les Fontaines
ECM 2705	2022-02	Gidon Kremer	Mieczysław Weinberg: Sonatas for Violin Solo	ECM New Series
ECM 2706	2022-11	Duo Gavazza	Kõrvits, Schumann, Grieg	ECM New Series
ECM 2707	N/A	N/A	N/A	unissued
ECM 2708	N/A	N/A	N/A	unissued
ECM 2709	2022-06	Carolin Widmann	L'Aurore	ECM New Series
ECM 2710-16	2022-09	Robert Levin	Wolfgang Amadeus Mozart – The Piano Sonatas	ECM New Series
ECM 2717	N/A	N/A	N/A	unissued
ECM 2718	N/A	N/A	N/A	unissued
ECM 2719	N/A	N/A	N/A	unissued
ECM 2720	N/A	N/A	N/A	unissued
ECM 2721	2022-02	Kit Downes, Petter Eldh, James Maddren	Vermillion	
ECM 2722	2023-03	Ralph Alessi Quartet	It’s Always Now	
ECM 2723	2023-10	Thomas Larcher	The Living Mountain	ECM New Series, Recorded June 2021 & May 2022
ECM 2724	2022-07	Gard Nilssen Acoustic Unity	Elastic Wave	Recorded June 2021, Studios La Buissonne, Pernes les Fontaines
ECM 2725	N/A	N/A	N/A	unissued
ECM 2726	2022-04	Jon Balke, Siwan	Hafla	Recorded May–June 2021, The Village Recording, Copenhagen
ECM 2727	2022-05	John Scofield	John Scofield	Recorded August 2021, Top Story Studio, Katonah NY
ECM 2728/29	2022-08	Heiner Goebbels	A House of Call – My Imaginary Notebook	ECM New Series, Recorded September 2021, Prinzregententheater, München
ECM 2730/31	2026-09	András Schiff	Johannes Brahms: Klavierstücke	ECM New Series, Recorded March 2021, Kammermusiksaal Beethovenhaus, Bonn
ECM 2732/33	2026-10	The Tallis Scholars, Peter Phillips	Live in Venice - Monteverdi, Palestrina, Lotti, Allegri, Komitas, Pärt	ECM New Series, Recorded July 2017, Basilica di San Marco, Venezia
ECM 2734	2022-09	Wolfert Brederode, Matangi Quartet, Joost Lijbaart	Ruins and Remains	
ECM 2735	2022-08	Barre Phillips, György Kurtág jr.	Face à Face	
ECM 2736	2022-10	Benjamin Lackner, Mathias Eick, Jérôme Regard, Manu Katché	Last Decade	
ECM 2737	2022-02	Avishai Cohen, Yonathan Avishai, Barak Mori, Ziv Ravitz	Naked Truth	Recorded September 2021, Studios La Buissonne, Pernes les Fontaines
ECM 2739	2022-10	Oded Tzur	Isabela	Recorded September 2021, Auditorio Stelio Molo RSI, Lugano
ECM 2740	2022-09	Keith Jarrett	Bordeaux	Recorded July 2016, Auditorium de l'Opéra National de Bordeaux
ECM 2741	2026-04	Judith Berkson, Trevor Dunn, Gerald Cleaver	Thee They Thy	Recorded July 2021, Oktaven Audio, Mount Vernon, NY
ECM 2742	2022-04	Tord Gustavsen Trio	Opening	Recorded October 2021, Auditorio Stelio Molo RSI, Lugano
ECM 2743	2024-06	Delian Quartett, Claudia Barainsky	Im Wachen Traume - Schumann/Reimann, Byrd/Pierini, Purcell	Recorded October 2021, Abtei Marienmünster, Konzertsaal
ECM 2744	2022-10	Evgueni Galperine	Theory of Becoming	ECM New Series, Recorded January 2020-September 2021, Studio EGP, Paris
ECM 2745	2024-01	Gidon Kremer, Kremerata Baltica, Vida Miknevičiūtė	Songs of Fate	ECM New Series. Recorded July 2019 & July 2022
ECM 2746	2022-09	Enrico Rava, Fred Hersch	The Song Is You	
ECM 2747	2022-11	Jakob Bro, Joe Lovano	Once Around the Room – A Tribute to Paul Motian	Recorded November 2021, The Village Recording, Copenhagen
ECM 2748	2025-02	Billy Hart, Ethan Iverson, Mark Turner, Ben Street	Just	Recorded December 2021, Sound On Sound Recording Inc, New York
ECM 2749	2023-01	Sebastian Rochford, Kit Downes	A Short Diary	
ECM 2750	2022-11	Meredith Monk	The Recordings	ECM New Series
ECM 2751	2025-10	Meredith Monk & Vocal Ensemble	Cellular Songs	Recorded January–March 2022 & March 2024, Power Station, New York
ECM 2752	2024-06	Anna Gourari, Orchestra della Svizzera italiana, Markus Poschner	Paul Hindemith / Alfred Schnittke	ECM New Series. Recorded: December 2021, Auditorio Stelio Molo RSI, Lugano
ECM 2753-55	2024-11	Alexander Lonquich, Münchener Kammerorchester	Ludwig van Beethoven: The Piano Concertos	Recorded January 2022, Rathausprunksaal, Landshut
ECM 2756	2022-08	Paul Giger, Marie-Louise Dähler, Pudi Lehmann, Franz Vitzthum, Carmina Quartet	ars moriendi	ECM New Series
ECM 2757	2023-01	Stephan Micus	Thunder	
ECM 2758	2023-03	Ralph Towner	At First Light	Recorded February 2022, Auditorio Stelio Molo RSI, Lugano
ECM 2759	2022-08	Julia Hülsmann Quartet	The Next Door	
ECM 2760	2024-02	Vijay Iyer, Linda May Han Oh, Tyshawn Sorey	Compassion	Recorded May 2022, Oktaven Audio, Mount Vernon, NY
ECM 2761	2023-01	Anders Jormin, Lena Willemark, Karin Nakagawa, Jon Fält	Pasado en claro	
ECM 2762	2023-06	Nils Økland, Sigbjørn Apeland	Glimmer	Recorded January–March 2021, ABC Studio, Etne
ECM 2763	2022-10	Arild Andersen Group	Affirmation	
ECM 2764	2023-05	Jacob Young Trio	Eventually	Recorded May 2021, Klokkereint Studio, Gjøvik
ECM 2765	2025-10	Zehetmair Quartett	Johannes Brahms: Streichquartette op. 51	Recorded November 2021, Konzerthaus Blaibach
ECM 2766	2023-01	Mette Henriette	Drifting	
ECM 2767	2023-06	Vox Clamantis	Music by Henrik Ødegaard	ECM New Series. Recorded March 2021, St.Nicholas Dome Church, Haapsalu
ECM 2768	2022-11	Christian Reiner	Pier Paolo Pasolini: Land der Arbeit	Recorded 2021-2022
ECM 2769	2023-04	Zsófia Boros	El último aliento	ECM New Series. Recorded March–April 2022, Auditorio Stelio Molo RSI, Lugano
ECM 2770	N/A	N/A	N/A	unissued
ECM 2771	2024-11	Thomas Strønen, Craig Taborn, Chris Potter, Sinikka Langeland, Jorge Rossy	Relations	Recorded August 2018, Auditorio Stelio Molo RSI, Lugano
ECM 2772	2023-09	Wolfgang Muthspiel, Scott Colley, Brian Blade	Dance of the Elders	Recorded February 2022, 25th Street Recording, Oakland
ECM 2773	N/A	N/A	N/A	unissued
ECM 2774	N/A	N/A	N/A	unissued
ECM 2775	2023-03	Bobo Stenson Trio	Sphere	Recorded April 2022, Auditorio Stelio Molo RSI, Lugano
ECM 2776	2023-09	Sinikka Langeland	Wind and Sun	June 2022, Rainbow Studio, Oslo
ECM 2777	2023-05	Joe Lovano's Trio Tapestry	Our Daily Bread	Recorded May 2022, Auditorio Stelio Molo RSI, Lugano
ECM 2778	2023-09	Maciej Obara Quartet	Frozen Silence	Recorded June 2022, Rainbow Studio, Oslo
ECM 2779	2023-11	Nitai Hershkovits	Call on the old wise	Recorded June 2022, Auditorio Stelio Molo RSI, Lugano
ECM 2780	2025-09	Vox Clamantis	Arvo Pärt: And I heard a voice	Recorded April 2021, Haapsalu Cathedral
ECM 2781	2023-06	Elina Duni, Rob Luft, Matthieu Michel, Fred Thomas	A Time to Remember	Recorded July 2022, Studios La Buissonne, Pernes les Fontaines
ECM 2782	2024-09	Florian Weber	Imaginary Cycle	Recorded July 2022, Sendesaal Bremen
ECM 2783	2024-01	Matthieu Bordenave, Florian Weber, Patrice Moret, James Maddren	The Blue Land	Recorded October 2022, Studios La Buissonne, Pernes les Fontaines
ECM 2784	2025-08	Estonian National Symphony Orchestra, Olari Elts	Erkki-Sven Tüür: Aeris	Recorded September 2022, Estonia Concert Hall, Tallinn
ECM 2785	2024-08	Danish String Quartet	Keel Road	ECM New Series. Recorded: November 2022, The Village Recording, Copenhagen
ECM 2786	N/A	N/A	N/A	unissued
ECM 2787	2025-07	Signum Quartet	A Dark Flaring - Works for String Quartet from South Africa	Recorded September 2022, Sendesaal Bremen
ECM 2788	2023-11	The Gurdjieff Ensemble, Levon Eskenian	Zartir	Recorded December 2021, Radio Recording Studio Yerevan
ECM 2789	2024-02	John Surman	Words Unspoken	Recorded December 2022, Rainbow Studio, Oslo
ECM 2790/91	2023-06	Keith Jarrett	Carl Philipp Emanuel Bach	ECM New Series. Recorded May 1994, Cavelight Studio
ECM 2792	N/A	N/A	N/A	unissued
ECM 2793	2023-09	Estonian Philharmonic Chamber Choir, Tallinn Chamber Orchestra, Tõnu Kaljuste	Veljo Tormis: Reminiscentiae	ECM New Series. Recorded October & November 2020, Methodist Church, Tallinn
ECM 2794	2024-01	Arve Henriksen, Harmen Fraanje	Touch of Time	Recorded January 2023, Auditorio Stelio Molo RSI, Lugano
ECM 2795	N/A	N/A	N/A	unissued
ECM 2796/97	2023-10	John Scofield	Uncle John’s Band	Recorded August 2022, Clubhouse Studios, Rhinebeck
ECM 2798	N/A	N/A	N/A	unissued
ECM 2799	2024-04	Fred Hersch	Silent, Listening	Recorded May 2023, Auditorio Radiotelevisione svizzera, Lugano

=== ECM 28xx – ===
Catalog number	Date released	Artist	Title	Notes
ECM 2800	2023-11	Estonian Philharmonic Chamber Choir, Tallinn Chamber Orchestra, Tõnu Kaljuste	Arvo Pärt: Tractus	ECM New Series. Recorded September 2022, Methodist Church, Tallinn
ECM 2801	2026-09	Paul Griffiths, Jack Quartet	Samuel Beckett, Trevor Bača: Stirrings Still	ECM New Series. Recorded May 2023 & September 2024, Auditorio Stelio Molo RSI, Lugano
ECM 2802	2025-07	Dino Saluzzi, Jacob Young, José Saluzzi	El Viejo Caminante	Recorded April 2023, Saluzzi Music Studio, Buenos Aires
ECM 2803	2026-10	Gidon Kremer, Kremerata Baltica	Pages of a Biography - Georgs Pelēcis, Andrius Žlabys, Arvo Pärt	ECM New Series, Recorded November 2020 & January 2024
ECM 2804	N/A	N/A	N/A	unissued
ECM 2805	N/A	N/A	N/A	unissued
ECM 2806	2024-10	Anja Lechner	Bach / Abel / Hume	ECM New Series. Recorded May 2023, Himmelfahrtskirche Sendling, Munich
ECM 2807	2026-02	Heinz Holliger, Marie-Lise Schüpbach	con slancio	ECM New Series. Recorded July–August 2020, Radiostudio DRS, Zürich
ECM 2808	2024-07	Giovanni Guidi, James Brandon Lewis, Thomas Morgan, João Lobo	A New Day	Recorded August 2023, Studios La Buissonne, Pernes les Fontaines
ECM 2809	2024-11	Colin Vallon, Patrice Moret, Julian Sartorius	Samares	Recorded June–July 2023, Auditorio Stelio Molo RSI, Lugano
ECM 2810	2024-09	Alice Zawadzki, Fred Thomas, Misha Mullov-Abbado	Za Górami	Recorded June 2023, Auditorio Stelio Molo RSI, Lugano
ECM 2811	2024-11	Norma Winstone, Kit Downes	Outpost Of Dreams	Recorded April 2023, Artesuono Recording Studio, Udine
ECM 2812	2023-11	Palle Mikkelborg, Jakob Bro, Marilyn Mazur	Strands – Live at the Danish Radio Concert Hall	Recorded February 2023, Danish Radio Concert Hall, Copenhagen
ECM 2813	2024-09	Trygve Seim, Frode Haltli	Our Time	Recorded June 2023, Himmelfahrtskirche Sendling, Munich
ECM 2814	N/A	N/A	N/A	unissued
ECM 2815	2024-10	Yuuko Shiokawa, András Schiff	Brahms / Schumann	ECM New Series. Recorded December 2015 & January 2019, Auditorio Stelio Molo RSI, Lugano
ECM 2816	N/A	N/A	N/A	unissued
ECM 2817	N/A	N/A	N/A	unissued
ECM 2818	2025-02	Yuval Cohen Quartet	Winter Poems	Recorded September 2023, Studios La Buissonne, Pernes les Fontaines
ECM 2819	2025-01	François Couturier, Dominique Pifarély	Preludes and Sings	Recorded October 2023, Historischer Reitstadel, Neumarkt
ECM 2820	2024-10	Tord Gustavsen Trio	Seeing	Recorded October 2023, Studios La Buissonne, Pernes les Fontaines
ECM 2821	2024-06	Oded Tzur	My Prophet	Recorded November 2023, Studios La Buissonne, Pernes les Fontaines
ECM 2822	2024-10	Avishai Cohen, Yonathan Avishai, Barak Mori, Ziv Ravitz	Ashes to Gold	Recorded November 2023, Studios La Buissonne, Pernes les Fontaines
ECM 2823	N/A	N/A	N/A	unissued
ECM 2824	2024-10	Lucian Ban, Mat Maneri	Transsylvanian Dance	Recorded October 2022, CJT Hall, Timișoara
ECM 2825	2025-02	Mathias Eick Kristjan Randalu, Ole Morten Vågan, Hans Hulbækmo	Lullaby	Recorded January 2024, Rainbow Studio, Oslo
ECM 2826	2024-10	Arild Andersen	Landloper	Recorded June 2020, Victoria National Jazz Scene, Oslo
ECM 2827	2024-10	Jordina Millà, Barry Guy	Live in Munich	Recorded February 2022, Schwere Reiter, München
ECM 2828	2024-11	Keith Jarrett, Paul Motian, Gary Peacock	The Old Country	Recorded September 1992, Deer Head Inn
ECM 2829/30	2025-08	Keith Jarrett, Paul Motian, Gary Peacock	At The Deer Head Inn - The Complete Recordings	Recorded September 1992, Deer Head Inn
ECM 2831	2024-09	Louis Sclavis, Benjamin Moussay	Unfolding	Recorded March 2024, Studios La Buissonne, Pernes les Fontaines
ECM 2832	2025-01	Benjamin Lackner, Mathias Eick Mark Turner, Linda May Han Oh, Matthieu Chazarenc	Spindrift	Recorded March 2024, Studios La Buissonne, Pernes les Fontaines
ECM 2833	2026-01	Craig Taborn, Tomeka Reid, Ches Smith	Dream Archives	Recorded January 2024, Firehouse 12, New Haven
ECM 2834	2024-11	Stephan Micus	To the Rising Moon	Recorded 2021-2023, MCM Studios
ECM 2835	2026-03	Mark Turner, Jason Palmer, Joe Martin, Jonathan Pinson	Patternmaster	Recorded April 2024, Studios La Buissonne, Pernes les Fontaines
ECM 2836	2025-06	Fred Hersch, Drew Gress, Joey Baron	The Surrounding Green	Recorded May 2024, Auditorio Stelio Molo RSI, Lugano
ECM 2837	2025-01	Julia Hülsmann Quartet	Under The Surface	Recorded June 2024, Rainbow Studio, Oslo
ECM 2838	2025-03	Anouar Brahem, Anja Lechner, Django Bates, Dave Holland	After the Last Sky	Recorded May 2024, Auditorio Stelio Molo RSI, Lugano
ECM 2839	2025-02	Jon Balke	Skrifum	Recorded November 2023, The Village Recording, Copenhagen
ECM 2840	2025-03	Wadada Leo Smith, Vijay Iyer	Defiant Life	Recorded July 2024, Auditorio Stelio Molo RSI, Lugano
ECM 2841	N/A	N/A	N/A	unissued
ECM 2842	2025-12	Thomas Strønen, Time Is A Blind Guide	Off Stillness	Recorded December 2021, Rainbow Studio, Oslo
ECM 2843	2025-11	Wu Wei, Martin Stegner, Janne Saksala	Pur ti miro	Recorded October 2022, Teldex Studios, Berlin
ECM 2844	2026-01	Björn Meyer	Convergence	Recorded September 2024, Bavaria Musikstudios, München
ECM 2845	N/A	N/A	N/A	unissued
ECM 2846	2025-03	Nicolas Masson, Colin Vallon, Patrice Moret, Lionel Friedli	Renaissance	Recorded November 2023, Studios La Buissonne, Pernes les Fontaines
ECM 2847	2025-10	Sokratis Sinopoulos, Yann Keerim	Topos	Recorded February 2024, Sierra Studios, Athens
ECM 2848	2025-03	Rolf Lislevand	Libro primo	Recorded 2022-2023, Moosestudios, Evje
ECM 2849	2026-11	Dominic Miller	Diana	Recorded December 2024, Studios La Buissonne, Pernes les Fontaines
ECM 2850	N/A	N/A	N/A	unissued
ECM 2851	N/A	N/A	N/A	unissued
ECM 2852	N/A	N/A	N/A	unissued
ECM 2853	N/A	N/A	N/A	unissued
ECM 2854	2026-04	Duo Gazzana	Prokofiev, Pärt, Schnittke	ECM New Series, Recorded February 2025, Reitstadel, Neumarkt
ECM 2855	2026-05	Joe Lovano, Julian Lage, Asante Santi Debriano, Will Calhoun	Paramount Quartet	Recorded February 2025, Studios La Buissonne, Pernes les Fontaines
ECM 2856	2026-09	Andy Sheppard, Rita Marcotulli, Michel Benita	Salt Catchers	Recorded March 2025, Auditorio Stelio Molo RSI, Lugano
ECM 2857	2025-09	Wolfgang Muthspiel, Scott Colley, Brian Blade	Tokyo	Recorded October 2024, Studio Dede, Tokyo
ECM 2858	2025-10	Steve Tibbetts, Marc Anderson, JT Bates	Close	Recorded 2021-2024, St. Paul, Minnesota
ECM 2859	2026-08	Ayumi Tanaka, Thomas Morgan, Thomas Strønen	Windflower	Recorded May 2025, Studios La Buissonne, Pernes les Fontaines
ECM 2860	2025-11	John Scofield, Dave Holland	Memories of Home	Recorded August 2024, NRS Recording Studio, Catskill NY
ECM 2861	N/A	N/A	N/A	unissued
ECM 2862	N/A	N/A	N/A	unissued
ECM 2863	N/A	N/A	N/A	unissued
ECM 2864	2026-07	Ralph Alessi	A Sun That Never Sets	Recorded February 2025, Oktaven Audio Studio, New Jersey
ECM 2865	N/A	N/A	N/A	unissued
ECM 2866	2026-04	Elina Duni, Rob Luft	Reaching for the Moon	Recorded June 2025, Studios La Buissonne, Pernes les Fontaines
ECM 2867	2026-03	Marilyn Crispell, Anders Jormin	Memento	Recorded July 2025, Auditorio Stelio Molo RSI, Lugano
ECM 2868	2026-10	Enrico Rava, Fearless Five with Joe Lovano	Corners	Recorded July 2025, Auditorium Parco della Musica Ennio Morricone, Rome
ECM 2869	2026-01	Julia Hülsmann Octet	While I Was Away	Recorded September 2023, Hansa Studio, Berlin
ECM 2870	N/A	N/A	N/A	unissued
ECM 2871	2026-11	Stephan Micus	Traces in the Sand	Recorded 2023-2025, MCM Studios
ECM 2872	N/A	N/A	N/A	unissued
ECM 2873	N/A	N/A	N/A	unissued
ECM 2874	N/A	N/A	N/A	unissued
ECM 2875	N/A	N/A	N/A	unissued
ECM 2876	2026-06	Mick Goodrick, Fred Hersch	Feebles, Fables and Ferns	Recorded August 1988, Classic Sound Studio, NYC
ECM 2877	N/A	N/A	N/A	unissued
ECM 2878	2026-06	Bob Rutman, Ensemble Modern Orchestra, Peter Eötvös	Heiner Goebbels: Walden	ECM New Series, Recorded November 1998
ECM 2879	2026-06	Steve Swallow	Winter Songs	Recorded September 2024, Sear Sound, New York
ECM 2880	2026-11	Keith Jarrett	Roma	Recorded July 2016, Auditorium Parco della Musica, Rome
ECM 2881	N/A	N/A	N/A	unissued
ECM 2882	N/A	N/A	N/A	unissued
ECM 2883	2026-09	Enzo Favata	Ritornare	Recorded January 2026, Bavaria Musikstudios, Munich
ECM 2884	N/A	N/A	N/A	unissued

== rarum ==
Catalog number	Year	Artist	Title	Notes
rarum 8001	2002	Keith Jarrett	Selected Recordings I	
rarum 8002	2002	Jan Garbarek	Selected Recordings II	
rarum 8003	2002	Chick Corea	Selected Recordings III	
rarum 8004	2002	Gary Burton	Selected Recordings IV	
rarum 8005	2002	Bill Frisell	Selected Recordings V	
rarum 8006	2002	Art Ensemble of Chicago	Selected Recordings VI	
rarum 8007	2002	Terje Rypdal	Selected Recordings VII	
rarum 8008	2002	Bobo Stenson	Selected Recordings VIII	
rarum 8009	2004	Pat Metheny	Selected Recordings IX	
rarum 8010	2004	Dave Holland	Selected Recordings X	
rarum 8011	2004	Egberto Gismonti	Selected Recordings XI	
rarum 8012	2004	Jack DeJohnette	Selected Recordings XII	
rarum 8013	2004	John Surman	Selected Recordings XIII	
rarum 8014	2004	John Abercrombie	Selected Recordings XIV	
rarum 8015	2004	Carla Bley	Selected Recordings XV	
rarum 8016	2004	Paul Motian	Selected Recordings XVI	
rarum 8017	2004	Tomasz Stańko	Selected Recordings XVII	
rarum 8018	2004	Eberhard Weber	Selected Recordings XVIII	
rarum 8019	2004	Arild Andersen	Selected Recordings XIX	
rarum 8020	2004	Jon Christensen	Selected Recordings XX	
rarum 8080	2002	Various Artists	Selected Recordings I–VIII	8-CD box set
rarum 8090	2004	Various Artists	Selected Recordings IX–XX	12-CD box set

== Works ==
Catalog number	Year	Artist	Title
Works 266	1984	Jan Garbarek	Works
Works 267	1984	Gary Burton	Works
Works 268	1984	Ralph Towner	Works
Works 269	1984	Egberto Gismonti	Works
Works 270	1984	Pat Metheny	Works
Works 272	1988	Pat Metheny	Works II
Works 273	1988	Bill Frisell	Works
Works 274	1988	Lester Bowie	Works
Works 275	1988	John Abercrombie	Works
Works 276	1988	Collin Walcott	Works
Works 425	1985	Keith Jarrett	Works
Works 426	1985	Chick Corea	Works
Works 427	1985	Jack DeJohnette	Works
Works 428	1985	Terje Rypdal	Works
Works 429	1985	Eberhard Weber	Works

== JAPO Records discography ==
Catalog number	Year	Artist	Title	Notes
JAPO 60001	1971	Mal Waldron, Jimmy Jackson, Eberhard Weber, Fred Braceful	The Call	
JAPO 60002	1973	Dollar Brand	African Piano	AKA Abudullah Ibrahim
JAPO 60003	1973	Barre Phillips	For All It Is	
JAPO 60004	1974	Herbert Joos	The Philosophy of the Fluegelhorn	
JAPO 60005	1974	Dollar Brand	Ancient Africa	AKA Abudullah Ibrahim
JAPO 60006	1973	Bobby Naughton Units	Understanding	
JAPO 60007	1974	Edward Vesala	Nan Madol	reissued as ECM 1077 ST in 1976
JAPO 60008	1975	Jiri Stivin, Rudolf Dasek	System Tandem	
JAPO 60009	1975	Children at Play	Children at Play	
JAPO 60010	1976	Rava	Quotation Marks	
JAPO 60011	1976	Magog	Magog	
JAPO 60012	1976	OM	Kirikuki	
JAPO 60013	1976	Manfred Schoof Quintet	Scales	
JAPO 60014	1976	Larry Karush, Glen Moore	May 24, 1976	
JAPO 60015	1977	Herbert Joos	Daybreak	
JAPO 60016	1977	OM	Rautionaha	
JAPO 60017	1977	Stephan Micus	Implosions	
JAPO 60018	1977	Ken Hyder's Talisker	Land of Stone	
JAPO 60019	1978	Manfred Schoof Quintet	Light Lines	
JAPO 60020	1977	Rena Rama	Landscapes	
JAPO 60021	1978	Globe Unity	Improvisations	
JAPO 60022	1978	OM with Dom Um Romao	OM with Dom Um Romao	
JAPO 60023	1977	Lennart Aberg	Partial Solar Eclipse	
JAPO 60024	1978	Contact Trio	New Marks	
JAPO 60025	1978	Jack DeJohnette, Pierre Favre, Fredy Studer, Dom Um Romao, David Friedman, George Gruntz	Percussion Profiles	
JAPO 60026	1978	Stephan Micus	Till the End of Time	
JAPO 60027	1980	Globe Unity	Compositions	
JAPO 60028	1979	Barry Guy, Howard Riley, John Stevens, Trevor Watts	Endgame	
JAPO 60029	1979	TOK	Paradox	
JAPO 60030	1980	Manfred Schoof Quintet	Horizons	
JAPO 60031	1980	AMM III	It Had Been an Ordinary Enough Day in Pueblo, Colorado	
JAPO 60032	1980	OM	Cerberus	
JAPO 60033	1980	Elton Dean Quintet	Boundaries	
JAPO 60034	1982	Peter Warren	Solidarity	
JAPO 60035	1980	Tom Van Der Geld, Children at Play	Out Patients	
JAPO 60036	1981	Contact Trio	Musik	
JAPO 60037	1981	Es Herrscht Uhu Im Land	Es Herrscht Uhu Im Land	
JAPO 60038	1982	Stephan Micus	Wings over Water	
JAPO 60039	1983	The Globe Unity Orchestra	Intergalactic Blow	
JAPO 60040	1983	Stephan Micus	Listen to the Rain	
JAPO 60041	1985	Stephan Micus	East of the Night	
