= Keith Jarrett discography =

Catalog of published recordings by Keith Jarrett

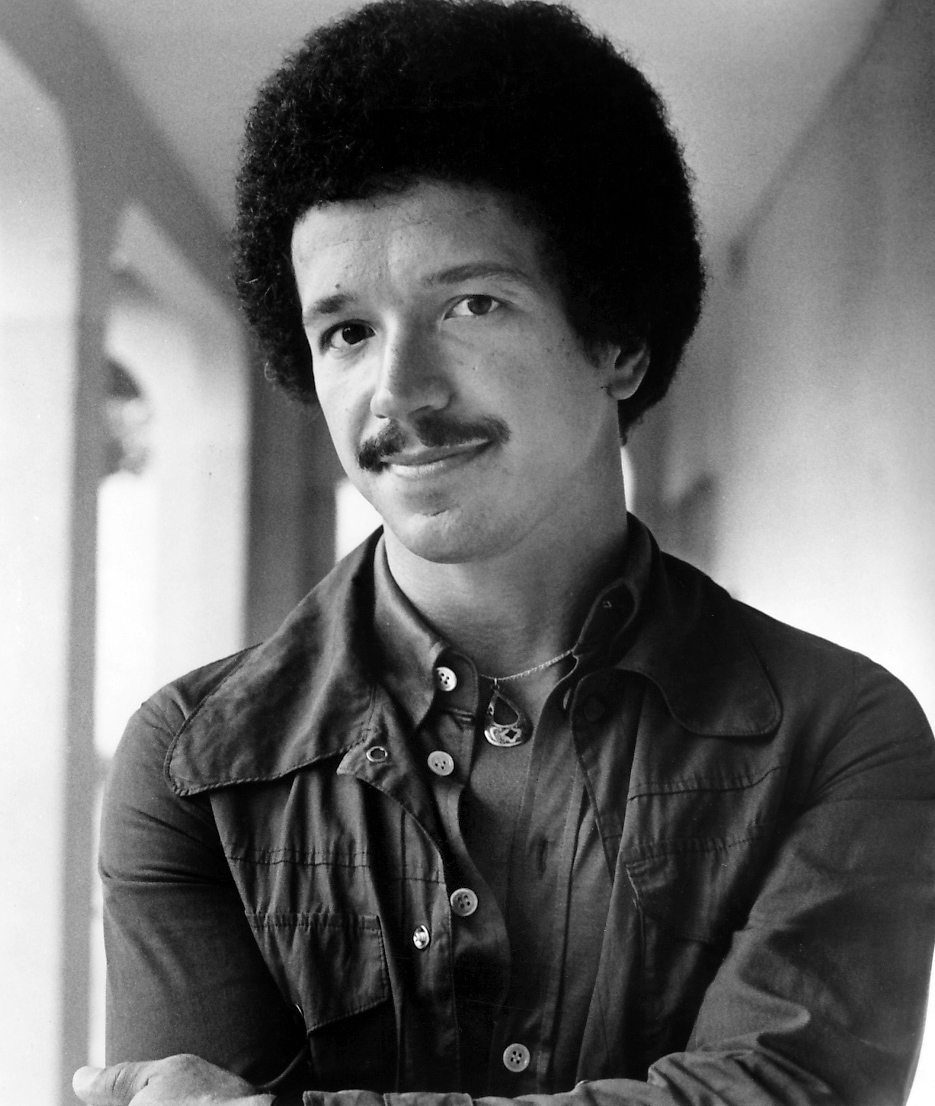
Keith Jarrett in 1975

Over the years, Keith Jarrett has recorded in many different settings and repertoires, including solo piano and jazz piano trio, classical and baroque music, improvised contemporary music. Well known for his impact on the piano and jazz scene, as a composer, multi-instrumentalist, and improviser, Jarrett's output embraces many different musical styles and spans a period of almost 50 years, comprising a production of more than 100 albums.

== As leader/co-leader ==
In chronological order as they were recorded, this general list contains Jarrett's albums (CD, LP, cassette) as a leader or co-leader excluding those related to the so-called "classical music" field where he plays Bach, Pärt, Mozart, Shostakovich, etc.

| Year recorded | Album | Notes | Label | Year released |
|---|---|---|---|---|
| 1967 | Life Between the Exit Signs | Trio with Charlie Haden and Paul Motian | Vortex (Atlantic) | 1968 |
| 1968 | Restoration Ruin | Solo on multiple instruments | Vortex (Atlantic) | 1968 |
| 1968 | Somewhere Before | Live – Trio with Haden and Motian | Vortex (Atlantic) | 1969 |
| 1970 | Gary Burton & Keith Jarrett | Quintet with vibraphonist Gary Burton | Atlantic | 1971 |
| 1971 | Ruta and Daitya | Duo with Jack DeJohnette | ECM | 1973 |
| 1971 | El Juicio (The Judgement) | American Quartet with Dewey Redman, Haden & Motian | Atlantic | 1975 |
| 1971 | Birth | American Quartet (Redman, Haden & Motian) | Atlantic | 1972 |
| 1971 | The Mourning of a Star | Trio with Haden & Motian | Atlantic | 1971 |
| 1971 | Facing You | Solo piano | ECM | 1972 |
| 1972 | Expectations | American Quartet (Redman, Haden & Motian) plus Sam Brown and Airto Moreira | Columbia | 1972 |
| 1972 | Hamburg '72 | Trio with Haden & Motian; released 2014 | ECM | 2014 |
| 1973 | Fort Yawuh | Live – American Quartet (Redman, Haden, Motian) and Danny Johnson | Impulse! | 1973 |
| 1973 | In the Light | With Willi Freivogel, Ralph Towner and orchestra | ECM | 1973 |
| 1973 | Solo Concerts: Bremen/Lausanne | Live – Solo piano | ECM | 1973 |
| 1974 | Treasure Island | American Quartet (Redman, Haden, Motian) and Danny Johnson plus Sam Brown | Impulse! | 1974 |
| 1974 | Belonging | European Quartet with Jan Garbarek, Palle Danielsson, and Jon Christensen | ECM | 1974 |
| 1974 | Luminessence | With Jan Garbarek, string orchestra conducted by Mladen Gutesha | ECM | 1975 |
| 1974 | Back Hand | American Quartet (Redman, Haden, Motian) and Franco | Impulse! | 1975 |
| 1974 | Death and the Flower | American Quartet (Redman, Haden, Motian) and Guilherme Franco | Impulse! | 1975 |
| 1975 | The Köln Concert | Live – Solo piano | ECM | 1975 |
| 1975 | Arbour Zena | With Garbarek, Haden and orchestra conducted by Mladen Gutesha | ECM | 1976 |
| 1975 | Mysteries | American Quartet (Redman, Haden, Motian) and Franco | Impulse! | 1976 |
| 1975 | Shades | American Quartet (Redman, Haden, Motian) and Franco | Impulse! | 1976 |
| 1976 | The Survivors' Suite | American Quartet (Redman, Haden, Motian) | ECM | 1977 |
| 1976 | Staircase | Solo Piano | ECM | 1977 |
| 1976 | Eyes of the Heart | Live – American Quartet (Redman, Haden, Motian) | ECM | 1979 |
| 1976 | Hymns/Spheres | Solo organ | ECM | 1976 |
| 1976 | Byablue | American Quartet (Redman, Haden, Motian) | Impulse! | 1977 |
| 1976 | Bop-Be | American Quartet (Redman, Haden, Motian) | Impulse! | 1978 |
| 1976 | Sun Bear Concerts | Live – Solo piano | ECM | 1978 |
| 1977 | My Song | European Quartet (Garbarek, Danielsson & Christensen) | ECM | 1978 |
| 1979 | Sleeper | Live – European Quartet (Garbarek, Danielsson & Christensen) | ECM | 2012 |
| 1979 | Personal Mountains | Live – European Quartet (Garbarek, Danielsson & Christensen) | ECM | 1989 |
| 1979 | Nude Ants | Live – European Quartet (Garbarek, Danielsson & Christensen) | ECM | 1980 |
| 1979 | Invocations/The Moth and the Flame | Solo piano, organ, voice & soprano saxophone | ECM | 1981 |
| 1980 | G.I. Gurdjieff: Sacred Hymns | Solo piano | ECM | 1980 |
| 1980 | The Celestial Hawk | Live – with orchestra conducted by Christopher Keene | ECM | 1980 |
| 1981 | Concerts | Live – Solo piano | ECM | 1982 |
| 1983 | Standards, Vol. 1 | Standards Trio with Gary Peacock & Jack DeJohnette | ECM | 1983 |
| 1983 | Standards, Vol. 2 | Standards Trio (Peacock & DeJohnette) | ECM | 1985 |
| 1983 | Changes | Standards Trio (Peacock & DeJohnette) | ECM | 1984 |
| 1985 | Spirits | Solo on various instruments | ECM | 1986 |
| 1985 | Standards Live | Live – Standards Trio (Peacock & DeJohnette) | ECM | 1986 |
| 1986 | Still Live | Live – Standards Trio (Peacock & DeJohnette) | ECM | 1986 |
| 1986 | Book of Ways | Solo clavichord | ECM | 1987 |
| 1986 | No End | Solo – performing on all instruments | ECM | 2013 |
| 1987 | Dark Intervals | Live – Solo piano | ECM | 1988 |
| 1987 | Changeless | Live – Standards Trio (Peacock & DeJohnette) | ECM | 1989 |
| 1988 | Paris Concert | Live – Solo piano | ECM | 1990 |
| 1989 | Standards in Norway | Live – Standards Trio (Peacock & DeJohnette) | ECM | 1995 |
| 1989 | Tribute | Live – Standards Trio (Peacock & DeJohnette) | ECM | 1990 |
| 1990 | The Cure | Live – Standards Trio (Peacock & DeJohnette) | ECM | 1991 |
| 1991 | Vienna Concert | Live – Solo piano | ECM | 1992 |
| 1991 | Bye Bye Blackbird | Standards Trio (Peacock & DeJohnette) | ECM | 1993 |
| 1992 | At the Deer Head Inn | Live – Trio (Peacock & Motian) | ECM | 1994 |
| 1992 | The Old Country (More from the Deer Head Inn) | Live – Trio (Peacock & Motian) | ECM | 2024 |
| 1993 | Bridge of Light | With orchestra conducted by Thomas Crawford | ECM | 1994 |
| 1994 | Keith Jarrett at the Blue Note | Live – Standards Trio (Peacock & DeJohnette) | ECM | 1995 |
| 1995 | La Scala | Live – Solo piano | ECM | 1997 |
| 1996 | Tokyo '96 | Live – Standards Trio (Peacock & DeJohnette) | ECM | 1998 |
| 1996 | A Multitude of Angels | Live – Solo piano | ECM | 2016 |
| 1998 | The Melody at Night, with You | Solo piano | ECM | 1999 |
| 1998 | After the Fall | Live – Standards Trio (Peacock & DeJohnette) | ECM | 2018 |
| 1999 | Whisper Not | Live – Standards Trio (Peacock & DeJohnette) | ECM | 2000 |
| 2000 | Inside Out | Live – Standards Trio (Peacock & DeJohnette) | ECM | 2001 |
| 2001 | Yesterdays | Live – Standards Trio (Peacock & DeJohnette) | ECM | 2009 |
| 2001 | Always Let Me Go | Live – Standards Trio (Peacock & DeJohnette) | ECM | 2002 |
| 2001 | My Foolish Heart | Live – Standards Trio (Peacock & DeJohnette) | ECM | 2007 |
| 2001 | The Out-of-Towners | Live – Standards Trio (Peacock & DeJohnette) | ECM | 2004 |
| 2002 | Up for It | Live – Standards Trio (Peacock & DeJohnette) | ECM | 2003 |
| 2002 | Radiance | Live – Solo piano | ECM | 2005 |
| 2005 | The Carnegie Hall Concert | Live – Solo piano | ECM | 2006 |
| 2006 | La Fenice | Live – Solo piano | ECM | 2018 |
| 2007 | Jasmine | Duo with Charlie Haden | ECM | 2010 |
| 2007 | Last Dance | Duo with Charlie Haden | ECM | 2014 |
| 2008 | Paris / London: Testament | Live – Solo piano | ECM | 2009 |
| 2009 | Somewhere | Live – Standards Trio (Peacock & DeJohnette) | ECM | 2013 |
| 2011 | Rio | Live – Solo piano | ECM | 2011 |
| 2014 | Creation | Live – Solo piano (from different concerts) | ECM | 2015 |
| 2016 | Munich 2016 | Live – Solo piano | ECM | 2019 |
| 2016 | Budapest Concert | Live – Solo piano | ECM | 2020 |
| 2016 | Bordeaux Concert | Live – Solo piano | ECM | 2022 |
| 2016 | New Vienna | Live – Solo piano | ECM | 2025 |
| 2016 | Roma | Live – Solo piano | ECM | 2026 |

=== First trio + American Quartet (1967–1976) ===
Keith Jarrett's recording career as a leader began in 1967 with the company of Charlie Haden on double-bass and Paul Motian on drums. With the addition of Dewey Redman on tenor saxophone in 1971 (Atlantic sessions), the trio metamorphosed into a quartet which, according to different sources, didn't start working steadily until 1973. Much later, due to the emergence of a "European" (or Scandinavian) counterpart in 1974, Jarrett's American group was called the "American Quartet".

The band's life lasted until October 1976. A few typically reliable sources, including Ian Carr's biography and Michael Cuscuna liner notes in Silence (GRP 11172, compilation album) set its last recording sessions (Byablue, Bop-Be) either in 1975 or (September) 1977, which according to Neil Tesser and the detailed credits found in Mysteries: The Impulse Years 1975-1976 is not quite accurate. The full story of the American Quartet's last sessions can be found here.

- First Trio: Keith Jarrett, Charlie Haden, Paul Motian
- American Quartet: Keith Jarrett, Charlie Haden, Paul Motian, Dewey Redman

(^) Live albums

| Recording date | Album | Personnel | Label | Release date | Venue / Location |
|---|---|---|---|---|---|
| 1967-05-04 | Life Between the Exit Signs | First Trio | Vortex | 1968-04 | Atlantic Studios, New York City (USA) |
| 1968-08-30, -31 | Somewhere Before | First Trio | Vortex | 1969-05 | (^) Shelly's Manne-Hole, Hollywood, CA (USA) |
| 1971-07-08, -09, -15, -16 | El Juicio (The Judgement) | First Trio + D. Redman | Atlantic | 1975 | Atlantic Studios, New York City (USA) |
| 1971-07-15, -16 | Birth | First Trio + D. Redman | Atlantic | 1972 | Atlantic Studios, New York City (USA) |
| 1971-07-08, -09, -16, 1971-08-23 | The Mourning of a Star | First Trio | Atlantic | 1971 | Atlantic Studios, New York City (USA) |
| 1972-04-05, -06, -27 | Expectations | American Quartet + others | Columbia | 1972-10 | New York City (USA) |
| 1972-06-14 | Hamburg '72 | First Trio | ECM | 2014-11 | (^) NDR Jazz Workshop, Hamburg (Germany) |
| 1973-02-24 | Fort Yawuh | American Quartet + D. Johnson | Impulse! | 1973 | (^) Village Vanguard, New York City (USA) |
| 1974-02-27, -28 | Treasure Island | American Quartet + others | Impulse! | 1974 | Generation Sound Studios, New York City (USA) |
| 1974-10-09, -10 | Back Hand | American Quartet + G. Franco | Impulse! | 1975 | Generation Sound Studios, New York City (USA) |
| 1974-10-09, -10 | Death and the Flower | American Quartet + G. Franco | Impulse! | 1975 | Generation Sound Studios, New York City (USA) |
| 1975-12-10, -12 | Mysteries | American Quartet + G. Franco | Impulse! | 1976 | Generation Sound Studios, New York City (USA) |
| 1975-12-10, -12 | Shades | American Quartet + G. Franco | Impulse! | 1976 | Generation Sound Studios, New York City (USA) |
| 1976-04 | The Survivors' Suite | American Quartet | ECM | 1977-01 | Tonstudio Bauer, Ludwigsburg (Germany) |
| 1976-05 | Eyes of the Heart | American Quartet | ECM | 1979-05 | (^) Theater am Kornmarkt, Bregenz (Austria) |
| 1976-10-14, -16 | Byablue | American Quartet | Impulse! | 1977 | Generation Sound Studios, New York City (USA) |
| 1976-10-14, -16 | Bop-Be | American Quartet | Impulse! | 1978 | Generation Sound Studios, New York City (USA) |

=== Solo piano (1971–2016) ===
All albums released by ECM (sometimes many years after they were performed / recorded).

In 2008, in an interview with Ted Panken, Keith Jarrett would give arguments to his tendency to record live albums:

Q: Why don’t you do studio recordings, by the way?
Jarrett: Well (a) I hate studios, and (b) more of the time I feel that what I do is for a public that’s actually in the space. Manfred and I talked about me doing another solo thing in the studio, and I’m open to it, but in general, that vibe is wrong for me. There’s too many wires around. Too many lightstands, too much metal around. The control room and the speakers are usually worse than the ones I have in my house. I don’t know if I could engage that.

| Recording date | Album | Release date | Note | Venue / Location |
|---|---|---|---|---|
| 1971-11-10 | Facing You | 1972-03 | | Arne Bendiksen Studio, Oslo (Norway) |
| 1973-03-20 | Solo Concerts: Bremen/Lausanne | 1973-11 | Live [3LP, 2CD] | Salle de Spectacles d'Epalinges, Lausanne (Switzerland) |
| 1973-07-12 | Solo Concerts: Bremen/Lausanne | 1973-11 | Live [3LP, 2CD] | Kleiner Sendesaal, Bremen (Germany) |
| 1975-01-24 | The Köln Concert | 1975-11 | Live | Kölner Oper, Cologne (Germany) |
| 1976-05 | Staircase | 1977-05 | [2LP, 2CD] | Davout Studio, Paris (France) |
| 1976-11-05 | Sun Bear Concerts | 1978-01 | Live [10LP, 6CD] | Kaikan Hall, Kyoto (Japan) |
| 1976-11-08 | Sun Bear Concerts | 1978-01 | Live [10LP, 6CD] | Sankei Hall, Osaka (Japan) |
| 1976-11-12 | Sun Bear Concerts | 1978-01 | Live [10LP, 6CD] | Aichi Auditorium, Nagoya (Japan) |
| 1976-11-14 | Sun Bear Concerts | 1978-01 | Live [10LP, 6CD] | Nakano Sun Plaza, Tokyo (Japan) |
| 1976-11-18 | Sun Bear Concerts | 1978-01 | Live [10LP, 6CD] | Hokkaido Kosei Nenkin Hall, Sapporo (Japan) |
| 1979-11 | The Moth and the Flame | 1981-05 | [2LP, 2CD] | Tonstudio Bauer, Ludwigsburg (Germany) |
| 1980-03 | G.I. Gurdjieff: Sacred Hymns | 1980-09 | | Tonstudio Bauer, Ludwigsburg (Germany) |
| 1981-05-28 | Concerts | 1982-09 | Live [3LP, 3CD] | Festspielhaus, Bregenz (Austria) |
| 1981-06-02 | Concerts | 1982-09 | Live [3LP, 3CD] | Herkulessaal der Residenz, Munich (Germany) |
| 1987-04-11 | Dark Intervals | 1988-10 | Live | Suntory Hall, Tokyo (Japan) |
| 1988-10-17 | Paris Concert | 1990-04 | Live | Salle Pleyel, Paris (France) |
| 1991-07-13 | Vienna Concert | 1992-09 | Live | Wiener Staatsoper, Vienna (Austria) |
| 1995-02-13 | La Scala | 1997-05 | Live | Teatro alla Scala, Milano (Italy) |
| 1996-10-23 | A Multitude of Angels | 2016-11 | Live [4CD] | Teatro Comunale, Modena (Italy) |
| 1996-10-25 | A Multitude of Angels | 2016-11 | Live [4CD] | Teatro Comunale, Ferrara (Italy) |
| 1996-10-28 | A Multitude of Angels | 2016-11 | Live [4CD] | Teatro Regio, Torino (Italy) |
| 1996-10-30 | A Multitude of Angels | 2016-11 | Live [4CD] | Teatro Carlo Felice, Genova (Italy) |
| 1998 | The Melody at Night, with You | 1999-10 | | Cavelight Studio, New Jersey (USA) |
| 2002-10-27 | Radiance | 2005-05 | Live [2CD] | Osaka Festival Hall, Osaka (Japan) |
| 2002-10-30 | Radiance | 2005-05 | Live [2CD] | Tokyo Bunka Kaikan (Main Hall), Tokyo (Japan) |
| 2005-09-26 | The Carnegie Hall Concert | 2006-09 | Live [2CD] | Isaac Stern Auditorium, Carnegie Hall, New York City (USA) |
| 2006-07-19 | La Fenice | 2018-10 | Live [2CD] | Gran Teatro La Fenice, Venezia (Italy) |
| 2008-11-26 | Paris / London: Testament | 2009-10 | Live [3CD] | Salle Pleyel, Paris (France) |
| 2008-12-01 | Paris / London: Testament | 2009-10 | Live [3CD] | Royal Festival Hall, London (UK) |
| 2011-04-09 | Rio | 2011-11 | Live [2CD] | Teatro Municipal, Rio de Janeiro (Brazil) |
| 2014-04, 2014-05, 2014-06, 2014-07 | Creation | 2015-05 | Live | Tokyo, Toronto, Paris and Rome |
| 2016-07-03 | Budapest Concert | 2020-10 | Live [2CD] | Béla Bartók National Concert Hall, Budapest (Hungary) |
| 2016-07-06 | Bordeaux Concert | 2020-10 | Live [2CD] | Auditorium de l'Opéra National de Bordeaux, Bordeaux (France) |
| 2016-07-16 | Munich 2016 | 2019-11 | Live [2CD] | Philharmonie am Gasteig, Munich (Germany) |

=== European Quartet (1974–1979) ===
The band featuring Jan Garbarek, Palle Danielsson and Jon Christensen was known as Keith Jarrett's "European" or "Scandinavian" Quartet or even the "Belonging Band" after their debut album Belonging

All albums released by ECM Records.

| Recording date | Album | Release date | Notes | Venue / Location |
|---|---|---|---|---|
| 1974-04-24, -25 | Belonging | 1974-10 | | Arne Bendiksen Studios, Oslo (Norway) |
| 1977-11 | My Song | 1978-06 | | Talent Studios, Oslo (Norway) |
| 1979-04-16 | Sleeper | 2012-07 | Live [2CD] | Nakano Sun Plaza, Tokyo (Japan) |
| 1979-04 | Personal Mountains | 1989-05 | Live | different dates and venues in Tokyo (Japan) |
| 1979-05 | Nude Ants | 1980-05 | Live [2LP, 2CD] | different dates at the Village Vanguard, New York City (USA) |

=== Standards Trio: Jarrett / Peacock / DeJohnette (1983–2014) ===
Jarrett's so-called "Standards Trio", consisting of Jarrett, Gary Peacock (1935–2020) and Jack DeJohnette (1942–2025), first performed together on Peacock's 1977 album Tales of Another, then re-grouped with Jarrett as the leader in January 1983. The trio performed their last concert in November 2014. All their albums were released by ECM Records.

All albums recorded live in concert except as indicated (**)

| Recording date | Album | Release date | Venue / Location |
|---|---|---|---|
| 1983-01-11, -12 | Standards, Vol. 1 | 1983 | (**) Power Station Studios, New York City (USA) |
| 1983-01-11, -12 | Changes | 1984-09 | (**) Power Station Studios, New York City (USA) |
| 1983-01-11, -12 | Standards, Vol. 2 | 1985-04 | (**) Power Station Studios, New York City (USA) |
| 1985-07-02 | Standards Live | 1986-01 | Palais des Congrès, Studios de la Grande Armée, Paris (France) |
| 1986-07-13 | Still Live | 1988-03 | Philharmonic Hall, Munich (West Germany) |
| 1987-10-09, -11, -12, -14 | Changeless | 1989-10 | Different tracks recorded in Lexington, Dallas, Houston and Denver (USA) |
| 1989-10-07 | Standards in Norway | 1995-04 | Konserthuset, Oslo (Norway) |
| 1989-10-15 | Tribute | 1990-10 | Kölner Philharmonie, Cologne (Germany) |
| 1990-04-21 | The Cure | 1991-10 | The Town Hall, New York City (USA) |
| 1991-10-12 | Bye Bye Blackbird | 1993-04 | (**) Power Station Studios, New York City (USA) |
| 1994-06-03, -04, -05 | Keith Jarrett at the Blue Note | 1995-10 | Blue Note Jazz Club, New York City (USA) |
| 1996-03-30 | Tokyo '96 | 1998-04 | Orchard Hall, Tokyo (Japan) |
| 1998-11-14 | After the Fall | 2018-03 | New Jersey Performing Arts Center (NJPAC), Newark (USA) |
| 1999-07-05 | Whisper Not | 2000-10 | Palais des Congrès, Paris (France) |
| 2000-07-26, -28 | Inside Out | 2001-10 | Royal Festival Hall at the Southbank Centre, London (UK) |
| 2001-04-24, -30 | Yesterdays | 2009-01 | Metropolitan Festival Hall and Orchard Hall, Tokyo (Japan) |
| 2001-04 | Always Let Me Go | 2002-10 | Different dates at Metropolitan Festival Hall and Orchard Hall, Tokyo (Japan) |
| 2001-07-22 | My Foolish Heart | 2007-10 | Montreux Jazz Festival, Stravinski Auditorium, Montreux (Switzerland) |
| 2001-07-28 | The Out-of-Towners | 2004-08 | Bavarian State Opera, Munich (Germany) |
| 2002-07-16 | Up for It | 2003-05 | Juan-les-Pins (France) |
| 2009-07-11 | Somewhere | 2013-05 | KKL Luzern Concert Hall, Lucerne (Switzerland) |

=== Orchestral works ===
Original works composed, arranged and orchestrated by Keith Jarrett. Some of them involve improvisation and Jarrett does not play in some of them.

| Recording date | Album | Label | Release date | Notes | Venue / Location |
|---|---|---|---|---|---|
| 1973-02 | In the Light | ECM | 1974-04 | + Willi Freivogel, Ralph Towner, Stuttgart Radio Symphony Orchestra conducted by M. Gutesha | Tonstudio Bauer, Ludwigsburg (Germany) |
| 1974-04-29, -30 | Luminessence | ECM | 1975-03 | + Jan Garbarek, Stuttgart Radio Symphony Orchestra conducted by M. Gutesha | Tonstudio Bauer, Ludwigsburg (Germany) |
| 1975-10 | Arbour Zena | ECM | 1976-05 | + Jan Garbarek, Charlie Haden, Stuttgart Radio Symphony Orchestra conducted by M. Gutesha | Tonstudio Bauer, Ludwigsburg (Germany) |
| 1977-06 | Ritual | ECM | 1982-02 | Dennis Russell Davies – solo piano | Tonstudio Bauer, Ludwigsburg (Germany) |
| 1980-03-22 | The Celestial Hawk (For Orchestra, Percussion and Piano) | ECM | 1980-11 | + Syracuse Symphony Orchestra conducted by Christopher Keene | Carnegie Hall, New York City (USA) |
| 1993-03 | Bridge of Light | ECM | 1994-04 | + Fairfield Orchestra conducted by Thomas Crawford | State University of New York, Purchase (USA) |
| 1997-08-29 | Whale Spirit Rising | Chandos | 1999 | I Musici de Montréal "Elegy for Violin and String Orchestra" composed by Jarrett | La Prairie, Quebec (Canada) |

=== Miscellaneous works ===
| Recording date | Album | Setting | Label | Release date |
|---|---|---|---|---|
| 1968-03-12 | Restoration Ruin | Solo on multiple instruments (vocals, guitar, harmonica, soprano saxophone, etc.) + string quartet | Vortex | 1968 |
| 1971-05 | Ruta and Daitya | Duet with Jack DeJohnette recorded at Sunset Studios, Los Angeles, CA | ECM | 1973 |
| 1976-09 | Hymns/Spheres | Solo organ improvisations at Ottobeuren Benedictine Abbey (Germany) | ECM | 1976-11 |
| 1980-10 | Invocations | Solo organ + soprano saxophone improvisations at Ottobeuren Abbey (Germany) | ECM | 1981-05 |
| 1985-05 – 1985-06 | Spirits | Solo on multiple instruments (flutes, percussion, recorders, voice, soprano saxophone, guitar, piano etc.) | ECM | 1986-09 |
| 1986-07 | Book of Ways | Solo clavichord improvisations | ECM | 1987-09 |
| 1986 | No End | Solo on multiple instruments (electric guitar, electric bass, percussion, voice, with overdubbing etc.) | ECM | 2013-11 |

=== Plays "classical" music ===
| Recording date | Album / "Track" | Notes | Label | Year released |
|---|---|---|---|---|
| 1977-11 – 1984-02 | Arvo Pärt: Tabula Rasa / "Fratres" | Duet with Gidon Kremer | ECM | 1984 |
| 1984-06, 1985-01 | Barber / Bartók / Jarrett | | ECM | 2015 |
| 1987-02 | J. S. Bach: Das wohltemperierte Klavier, Buch I | Solo piano, studio recording [2CD] | ECM | 1988 |
| 1987-03 | J. S. Bach: The Well-Tempered Clavier Book 1 | Solo piano, live recording in Troy Savings Bank Music Hall, NY [2CD] | ECM | 2019 |
| 1986-01-30, 1988-05-21, -22 | Lou Harrison: Piano Concerto / Suite for Violin, Piano and Small Orchestra | With the New Japan Philharmonic orchestra conducted by Naoto Otomo | New World | 1988 |
| 1989-01-10, -11, -12 | J. S. Bach: Goldberg Variations | Solo harpsichord, live recording at Yatsugatake Kohgen Ongakudoh, Nagano Prefecture | ECM | 1989 |
| 1989? | Alan Hovhaness / Lou Harrison: Mysterious Mountain • Lousadzak • Elegiac Symphony / "Lousadzak, op. 48" | With the American Composers Orchestra conducted by Dennis Russell Davies | MusicMasters | 1989 |
| 1990-05 | J. S. Bach: Das wohltemperierte Klavier, Buch II | Solo harpsichord [2CD] | ECM | 1991 |
| 1990-06-01 – -05 | Handel: Sonatas | Duo with Michala Petri (recorder) | RCA | 1991 |
| 1991-07 | Dmitri Shostakovich: 24 Preludes and Fugues, op. 87 | Solo piano [2CD] | ECM | 1992 |
| 1991-09 | J. S. Bach: The French Suites | Solo harpsichord [2CD] | ECM | 1993 |
| 1991-09 | J. S. Bach: 3 Sonaten für Viola da Gamba und Cembalo | Duo with Kim Kashkashian (Jarrett plays harpsichord) | ECM | 1994 |
| 1992-02-28, -29; 1992-03-01 | Bach: Sonatas | Duo with Michala Petri (recorder) | RCA | 1992 |
| 1992? | Lou Harrison: Seven Pastorales / "Peggy Glanville-Hicks: Etruscan Concerto" | With the Brooklyn Philharmonic orchestra conducted by Dennis Russell Davies | MusicMasters | 1992 |
| 1993 | G. F. Handel: Suites for Keyboard | Solo piano | ECM | 1995 |
| 1994 | W. A. Mozart: Piano Concertos, Masonic Funeral Music, Symphony in G Minor | With orchestra conducted by Dennis Russell Davies [2CD] | ECM | 1996 |
| 1994 | Carl Philipp Emanuel Bach’s Württemberg Sonatas | Solo piano | ECM | 2023 |
| 1996 | W. A. Mozart: Piano Concertos / Adagio and Fugue | With orchestra conducted by Dennis Russell Davies [2CD] | ECM | 1999 |
| 2010 | J. S. Bach: Six Sonatas for Violin and Piano | Duo with Michelle Makarski [2CD] | ECM | 2013 |

=== Video ===
| Album | Notes | Label | Year released |
|---|---|---|---|
| Love Ship | 1968 concert with Charles Lloyd and 1970 concert with Miles Davis | Salt Peanuts | 1970 |
| Last Solo | 1984 Tokyo solo concert [VHS/Laserdisc/DVD (only NTSC)] | Image Entertainment | 2002 |
| Solo Tribute: Keith Jarrett – The 100th Performance in Japan | Solo Jarrett performing standards in Tokyo 1987 [VHS/Laserdisc/DVD (only NTSC)] | Image Entertainment | 2002 |
| The Art of Improvisation | Documentary [DVD] | EuroArts | 2005 |
| Tokyo Solo | 2002 solo concert; companion to Radiance [DVD] | ECM | 2006 |
| Directions | June 18, 1968 studio performance of the Charles Lloyd Quartet; 1970 Isle of Wight concert led by Miles Davis; 1971 Turin concert led by Davis; available in NTSC and PAL. (The 1968 concert is also available separately on DVD from Jazz Casual) [DVD] | Oh!vation | 2008 |
| Standards I / II Tokyo | Reissue of 1985/1986 trio concerts; originally released separately as Standards and Standards II [2DVD] | ECM | 2008 |
| Live in Japan 93 / 96 | Reissue of Standards Trio concerts; originally released separately as Live at Open Theater East and Trio Concert 1996 [2DVD] | ECM | 2008 |

=== Compilations ===
| Album | Notes | Label | Year released |
|---|---|---|---|
| Chick Corea/Herbie Hancock/Keith Jarrett/McCoy Tyner | Contains 2 pieces recorded 1966 from Keith Jarrett's LP Life between the Exit Signs. | Atlantic | 1976 |
| Best of Keith Jarrett | Recorded live at the Village Vanguard, New York and at Generation Sound, New York – all previously releases on various Impulse albums. | Impulse! | 1978 |
| Keith Jarrett: Works | compilation of Jarrett's recordings for the ECM label from 1971 to 1980 | ECM | 1980 |
| Foundations: The Keith Jarrett Anthology | [2CD] compilation of early work, from the Jazz Messengers and Charles Lloyd to the trio with Charlie Haden and Paul Motian | Rhino/ Atlantic | 1994 |
| Silence | CD compilation of the albums Byablue and Bop-Be with three tracks omitted to fit on a single CD | GRP | 1992 |
| Mysteries: The Impulse Years 1975–1976 | [4CD] compilation of the albums Shades, Mysteries, Byablue and Bop-Be, with outtakes | Impulse! | 1996 |
| Le virtuose du piano | CD compilation of early work (1966–71), from Charles Lloyd, Gary Burton to the trio with Charlie Haden and Paul Motian | Rhino / Warner Music France | 1996 |
| The Impulse Years: 1973–1974 | [5CD] compilation of the albums Fort Yawuh, Treasure Island, Death and The Flower and Back Hand, with outtakes | Impulse! | 1997 |
| rarum I: Selected Recordings | [2CD] compilation assembled by Jarrett from his ECM catalog | ECM | 2002 |
| Keith Jarrett: The Impulse Story | Single CD compilation from Jarrett's 1973–1976 Impulse recordings | Impulse! | 2006 |
| Setting Standards: New York Sessions | [3CD] compilation of the albums Standards, Vol. 1; Standards, Vol. 2 and Changes | ECM | 2008 |
| Sounds and Silence | contains one piece (two times) from Keith Jarrett's G.I. Gurdjieff: Sacred Hymns album | ECM | 2011 |
| Mysteries / Shades | Single disc compilation of the albums Mysteries and Shades | Universal Music Group | 2011 |
| Mysteries / Shades | [2CD] compilation of the albums Mysteries and Shades | Beat Goes On | 2013 |

== As sideman ==
=== With The Jazz Messengers ===
- Buttercorn Lady (Limelight, 1966)

=== With Charles Lloyd ===
- Dream Weaver (Atlantic, 1966)
- Forest Flower (Atlantic, 1967) – recorded in 1966
- Love-In (Atlantic, 1967)
- Montreux Jazz Festival (1967)[2CD]
- Journey Within (Atlantic, 1967)
- Charles Lloyd in Europe (Atlantic, 1968) – recorded in 1966
- Soundtrack (Atlantic, 1969) – recorded in 1968
- Charles Lloyd in the Soviet Union (Atlantic, 1970) – recorded in 1966
- The Flowering (Atlantic, 1971) – recorded in 1966
- Live... 1966 (Hi Hat, 2018)[2CD] – recorded in 1966

=== With Miles Davis ===
- Miles Davis at Fillmore (1970) – a double LP recorded on four consecutive nights at New York's Fillmore East in June 1970
  - Miles at the Fillmore – Miles Davis 1970: The Bootleg Series Vol. 3 (2014) – complete recordings of the live sessions that produced Miles Davis at Fillmore
- Isle of Wight (1970) – recorded live at the Isle of Wight Festival (UK), on August 29, 1970. The same material (albeit under a different name) is also included as a bonus track on the 3-CD album Munich Concert (2005) from Miles Davis
  - Miles Electric: A Different Kind of Blue (2004) – the 1970 performance at the Isle of Wight festival, released on DVD
  - Bitches Brew Live (2011) – organ, for 1970 Isle of Wight performance
- Live-Evil (1971)
  - The Cellar Door Sessions 1970 (2005) – complete recordings of the live sessions that produced the live segments of Live-Evil
- Get Up with It (1974) – a release of previously unavailable recordings (1970–1974), Jarrett on "Honky Tonk", recorded at Columbia Studios, New York, May 19, 1970
- Directions (1981) – a release of previously unavailable recordings (1960–1970), Keith Jarrett on "Konda", recorded in New York, May 21, 1970
- What I Say? Volume 1 (1994) – recorded live in Vienna, November 5, 1971
- What I Say? Volume 2 (1994) – recorded live at Fillmore West, October 17, 1970
- Another Bitches Brew (1995) - Two concerts in Belgrade, Serbia, of which the one from November 3, 1971, features Keith Jarrett
- The Complete Jack Johnson Sessions (2003) – recordings from 1969 and 1970, featuring Keith Jarrett on five tracks of the 5 CD box (two tracks of which were partially released in edited form on Get Up with It and Directions)
- Miles Davis at Newport 1955–1975: The Bootleg Series Vol. 4 (2015) – includes one complete concert (on 1 of 4 CDs) from the "Newport Jazz Festival in Europe" tour, in Zurich (Switzerland), October 22, 1971, featuring Keith Jarrett
- Bitches Brew 40th Anniversary Edition (2015) – includes one CD with a live concert at Tanglewood (Houston, Tx) from 1970, featuring Keith Jarrett

=== With others ===
- Chet Baker, Isn't it Romantic (Jazz Hour, 1993) – Compilation containing two pieces featuring Keith Jarrett. rec. 1963-64.
- Barbara & Ernie, Prelude To... (Cotillion, 1971) – 1 track "Satisfied"
- Charlie Haden, Closeness (Horizon, 1976)
- Freddie Hubbard, Sky Dive (CTI, 1973) – rec. 1972
- Don Jacoby, Swinging Big Sound (Decca, 1962)
- Scott Jarrett, Without Rhyme or Reason (Arista, 1980) – his younger brother
- Donal Leace, Donal Leace (Atlantic, 1972)
- Airto Moreira, Free (CTI, 1972)
- Bob Moses, Love Animal (Amulet, 1968)
- Paul Motian, Conception Vessel (ECM, 1973) – rec. 1972
- Gary Peacock, Tales of Another (ECM, 1977)
- Kenny Wheeler, Gnu High (ECM, 1976) – rec. 1975
- Marion Williams, Standing Here Wondering Which Way to Go (Atlantic, 1971)

== Sources ==
- Keith Jarrett entry on ECM Records
- Keith Jarrett past concerts on keithjarrett.org
- Keith Jarrett sessions at jazzdisco.org
- Keith Jarrett entry at discogs.com
