= Somewhere (Keith Jarrett album) =

Live album by Keith Jarrett
- Released: May 2013
- Recorded: July 11, 2009
- Venues: KKL Luzern Concert Hall; Lucerne, Switzerland
- Genre: Jazz
- Length: 65:33
- Labels: ECM Records; ECM 2200
- Producers: Manfred Eicher, Keith Jarrett

Keith Jarrett chronology
Rio (2011)	Somewhere (2013)	No End (2013)

Jarrett / Peacock / DeJohnette chronology
Yesterdays (2009)	Somewhere (2013)	After the Fall (2018)

Somewhere is a live album by Keith Jarrett's "Standards Trio," recorded in Switzerland on July 11, 2009 and released on ECM in May 2013.

== Reception ==
Professional ratings
Review scores
Source	Rating
Allmusic	4/5 stars
Guardian	4/5 stars
DownBeat	5/5 stars
All About Jazz	4.5/5 stars

In a review for AllMusic, Thom Jurek awarded the album 4 stars, calling it "another sublime chapter in this group's recorded legacy", and commented: "It is almost superfluous to write about Keith Jarrett's three-decades-and-running standards trio with Gary Peacock and Jack DeJohnette. Given their recorded output, it's easy to discern why they are regarded by many as the greatest living piano trio. They have continued to imbue the standards book with new dimensions of meaning, creating a near symbiotic dialogue in harmonic and rhythmic invention while remaining emotionally resonant."

Dave Gelly, writing for The Guardian, stated: "it's startling to realise that they have now been playing together, off and on, for the past 30 years... This set... shows no sign of flagging inspiration. If anything, the interplay between Jarrett, bassist Gary Peacock and drummer Jack DeJohnette is freer and more beguiling than ever."

Writing for DownBeat, James Hale remarked: "Opening with an abstract, rhapsodic solo 'Deep Space,' Somewhere feels like it might veer into free territory... but after three minutes Peacock and DeJohnette establish a sauntering pulse, and by the 11-minute mark the trio is grooving hard on Davis' 'Solar,' with Jarrett executing some exhilarating runs. The 'Somewhere'/'Everywhere' medley also covers broad territory, but in a different direction. From a gentle, sublime reading of the Leonard Bernstein/Stephen Sondheim theme, Jarrett shifts into one of his long, gospel-tinged vamps—a slow-burning build filled with ecstatic releases, and a textbook illustration of DeJohnette's creativity. As Jarrett's other endeavors have receded and the trio has grown into one of the jazz world's most sought-after concert acts, the unit has become a vehicle for the pianist's various signatures. In fact, Somewhere serves up a cross-section of pianistic styles beyond Jarrett's native devices, touching on stride for a highly percussive 'Between The Devil And The Deep Blue Sea' and bop for a steaming 'Tonight.'"

In an article at All About Jazz, John Kelman wrote: "Despite the 12-year gap since its last recorded work, Somewhere leaves no doubt that the special spark Jarrett, Peacock and DeJohnette first demonstrated on the bassist's Tales of Another (ECM, 1977) remains intact. If anything, Somewhere creates hope that another four years won't have to pass before this inimitable trio is heard from again."

Tyran Grillo, in a review at Between Sound and Space, commented: "Somewhere isn't so much a homecoming as it is a shoring up of a structure that has already held firm against many tides. Jarrett's ever-evolving pianism provides the aluminum siding, Peacock polishes the freshly installed hardwood floors, and DeJohnette fits new windows into every frame with until the house thrums with the presence of its longtime tenants. Being somewhere locates one not only in space, but also in time, and the album's clip reminds us that improvisation is a luxury never to be taken for granted. In this spirit they sound more with it than ever, due in no small part to the recording, which stands comfortably at the lip of the stage and twirls with delight. The result is an album that holds its own alongside Still Live as one of the trio's absolute finest."

Thomas Conrad, writing for Tidal, stated: "Somewhere is an unusual Standards Trio album because it includes both poles of Jarrett's art, the spontaneous composition of solo concerts and the lavish elaboration of standard repertoire. It is unexpected when alluring free fragments called 'Deep Space,' played solo, coalesce into a trio version of Miles Davis' 'Solar.' It is also exciting when Jarrett reverses that process and starts with a rapt rendering of Leonard Bernstein's 'Somewhere,' and then blows it up into 'Everywhere.'"

== Track listing ==
1. "Deep Space/Solar" (Miles Davis, Keith Jarrett) – 15:07
2. "Stars Fell on Alabama" (Frank S. Perkins) – 7:27
3. "Between the Devil and the Deep Blue Sea" (Harold Arlen, Ted Koehler) – 10:03
4. "Somewhere/Everywhere" (Leonard Bernstein, Jarrett, Stephen Sondheim) – 19:37
5. "Tonight" (Bernstein) – 6:49
6. "I Thought About You" (Johnny Mercer) – 6:30

Total effective playing time: 1:01:26 (the album contains 4:07 applause approximately)

== Personnel ==
Trio

- Keith Jarrett – piano
- Gary Peacock – double-bass
- Jack DeJohnette – drums

Production

- Keith Jarrett – producer
- Manfred Eicher – executive producer
- Martin Pearson – engineer (recording)
- Sascha Kleis – design
- Mario Giacomelli – photography (cover)
- Daniela Yohaness – photography (liner)

== Charts ==
Chart (2013)	Peak position
U.S. Billboard 200	177
U.S. Billboard Jazz Albums	3
