= Tribute (Keith Jarrett album) =

Live album by the Keith Jarrett Trio
- Released: October 1990
- Recorded: October 15, 1989
- Venue: Kölner Philharmonie; Köln, West Germany
- Genre: Jazz
- Length: 1:55:05
- Label: ECM; ECM 1420/21
- Producer: Manfred Eicher

Keith Jarrett chronology
Paris Concert (1990)	Tribute (1990)	The Cure (1991)

Jarrett / Peacock / DeJohnette chronology
Changeless (1989)	Tribute (1990)	The Cure (1991)

Tribute is a live double album by the Keith Jarrett Trio recorded at the Kölner Philharmonie on October 15, 1989, and released on ECM a year later. The trio—Jarrett's "Standards Trio"—features rhythm section Gary Peacock and Jack DeJohnette.

== October 1989 tour ==
Tribute was recorded in concert during the "Standards trio" October 1989 European tour, in which the Keith Jarrett trio performed fourteen concerts:

- October 1 – Palais des Beaux-Arts, Brussels (Belgium)
- October 3 – Berwaldhallen, Stockholm (Sweden)
- October 5 – Koncertsalen i Tivoli, Copenhagen (Denmark)
- October 7 – Konserthuset, Oslo (Norway) recorded and released as Standards in Norway [ECM 1542]
- October 9 – Royal Festival Hall, London (England)
- October 11 – Graf-Zeppelin-Haus, Friedrichshafen (Germany)
- October 15 – Kölner Philharmonie, Cologne (Germany)
- October 16 – Philharmonie Gasteig, Munich (Germany)
- October 18 – Musikhalle, Hamburg (Germany)
- October 19 – Kongreßalle Killesberg, Stuttgart (Germany)
- October 21 – Alte Oper, Frankfurt (Germany)
- October 23 – Palais de la Musique, Strasbourg (France)
- October 25 – Arsenal, Metz (France)
- October 28 – Théâtre des Champs-Elysées, Paris (France)

== Reception ==
Professional ratings
Review scores
Source	Rating
AllMusic	4.5/5 stars
The Penguin Guide to Jazz	2.5/4 stars
Downbeat	4.5/5 stars

The AllMusic review by Richard S. Ginell awarded the album 4½ stars and states, "While the Standards Trio rarely takes anything for granted, transforming everything in its path, the results are not quite as inventive here as on other releases".

Downbeat awarded the album 4.5 stars. Reviewer John Ephland wrote that the album was "a stunning musical communion that finds Jarrett, Peacock, and Dejohnette swinging their little asses off one moment, playing it slow, delicate, and heartfelt the next".

== Track listing ==
1. "Lover Man" [dedicated to Lee Konitz] (Jimmy Davis, Ram Ramirez, James Sherman) – 13:14
2. "I Hear a Rhapsody" [dedicated to Jim Hall] (Jack Baker, George Fragos, Dick Gasparre) – 11:19
3. "Little Girl Blue" [dedicated to Nancy Wilson] (Lorenz Hart, Richard Rodgers) – 6:05
4. "Solar" [dedicated to Bill Evans] (Miles Davis) – 9:32
5. "Sun Prayer" (Keith Jarrett) – 14:15
6. "Just in Time" [dedicated to Sonny Rollins] (Betty Comden, Adolph Green, Jule Styne) – 10:07
7. "Smoke Gets in Your Eyes" [dedicated to Coleman Hawkins] (Otto Harbach, Jerome Kern) – 8:26
8. "All of You" [dedicated to Miles Davis] (Cole Porter) – 8:08
9. "Ballad of the Sad Young Men" [dedicated to Anita O'Day] (Fran Landesman, Tommy Wolf) – 7:02
10. "All the Things You Are" [dedicated to Charlie Parker] (Oscar Hammerstein II, Jerome Kern) – 8:57
11. "It's Easy to Remember" [dedicated to John Coltrane] (Hart, Rodgers) – 7:08
12. "U Dance" (Jarrett) – 10:46

== Personnel ==
=== Keith Jarrett Trio ===
- Keith Jarrett – piano
- Gary Peacock – bass
- Jack DeJohnette – drums

=== Technical personnel ===
- Manfred Eicher – producer
- Jan Erik Kongshaug, O. Fries – recording engineer
- Barbara Wojirsch – cover design
