= The Cure (Keith Jarrett album) =

Live album by the Keith Jarrett Trio
- Released: October 1991
- Recorded: April 21, 1990
- Venue: The Town Hall; New York City
- Genre: Jazz
- Length: 1:17:36
- Label: ECM; ECM 1440
- Producer: Manfred Eicher

Keith Jarrett chronology
Tribute (1990)	The Cure (1991)	Vienna Concert (1992)

Jarrett / Peacock / DeJohnette chronology
Tribute (1990)	The Cure (1991)	Bye Bye Blackbird (1993)

The Cure is a live album by the Keith Jarrett Trio recorded at the Town Hall in New York City on April 21, 1990 and released on ECM October the following year. The trio—Jarrett's "Standards Trio"—features rhythm section Gary Peacock and Jack DeJohnette.

== Reception ==
AllMusic awarded the album 4 stars, with reviewer Richard S. Ginell, stating, "One's reservations fade when confronted with the sheer creativity and empathy that the trio displayed in this gorgeously recorded live date... first-class improvisational jazz."

Professional ratings
Review scores
Source	Rating
AllMusic	4/5 stars
The Penguin Guide to Jazz	4/4 stars

== Track listing ==
1. "Bemsha Swing" (Thelonious Monk, Denzil Best) – 9:43
2. "Old Folks" (Deddette Lee Hill, Willard Robison) – 11:18
3. "Woody 'n' You" (Dizzy Gillespie) – 6:38
4. "Blame It on My Youth" (Edward Heyman, Oscar Levant) – 8:16
5. "Golden Earrings" (Ray Evans, Jay Livingston, Victor Young) – 8:31
6. "Body and Soul" (Edward Heyman, Robert Sour, Frank Eyton, Johnny Green) – 13:26
7. "The Cure" (Keith Jarrett) – 10:31
8. "Things Ain't What They Used to Be" (Mercer Ellington) – 9:11

== Personnel ==
=== Keith Jarrett Trio ===
- Keith Jarrett – piano
- Gary Peacock – bass
- Jack DeJohnette – drums

=== Technical personnel ===
- Manfred Eicher – producer
- Jan Erik Kongshaug – recording engineer
- Barbara Wojirsch – cover design
- Kuni Shinohara – photography
