= Still Live (Keith Jarrett album) =

Live album by the Keith Jarrett Trio
- Released: March 1988
- Recorded: July 13, 1986
- Venue: Philharmonic Hall; Munich, W. Germany
- Genre: Jazz
- Length: 1:38:13
- Label: ECM 1360/61
- Producer: Manfred Eicher

Keith Jarrett chronology
Book of Ways (1987)	Still Live (1988)	Dark Intervals (1988)

Jarrett / Peacock / DeJohnette chronology
Standards Live (1986)	Still Live (1988)	Changeless (1989)

Still Live is a live double album by the Keith Jarrett Trio recorded on July 13, 1986, at the Philharmonic Hall in Munich, Germany, and released on ECM in March 1988. Jarrett's Standards trio features rhythm section Gary Peacock and Jack DeJohnette.

== "Klaviersommer 1986" Tour ==
Still Live was recorded during the "Klaviersommer 1986" Tour, in which the Standards trio performed at 14 cities over July 1986.

Jarrett would also recorded the solo clavichord album Book of Ways during a day-off day of the tour.

- 1 - Verona (Italy)
- 3 - Lugano (Switzerland)
- 6 - Hollabrunn (Austria)
- 8 - Milano (Italy)
- 9 - Cannes (France)
- 11 - Vienne (France)
- 13 - Munich (Germany)
- 16 - Istanbul (Turkey)
- 18 - Vitoria-Gasteiz (Spain)
- 19 - London (UK)
- 21 - Molde (Norway)
- 22 - Copenhaguen (Denmark)
- 24 - Montpellier (France)
- 26 - Antibes (France)

== Reception ==
Professional ratings
Review scores
Source	Rating
AllMusic	3/5 stars
The Penguin Guide to Jazz	3.5/4 stars

The AllMusic review by Richard S. Ginell awarded the album 3 stars and states, "Jarrett treats his brace of pop and jazz standards with unpredictable, often eloquently melodic and structural originality.... There is a considerable amount of Jarrett vocalizing, though; sometimes he sounds like a tortured animal."

In his 2002 Records to Die For, Stereophile's Lonnie Brownell remarked:

Over the past 30 years, Keith Jarrett has released 46 albums as a leader on the ECM label. Of these, the best are the 12 recorded with his "Standards Trio," and of these, the best is Still Live. Jarrett and Gary Peacock and Jack DeJohnette flow from Richard Rodgers to Oscar Hammerstein to Harold Arlen to Keith Jarrett to spontaneous free interpretive variation to Charlie Parker and back again, until it no longer matters where Johnny Mercer leaves off and this trio begins, because it is all one tribal dance. On this night in 1986 in Munich's Philharmonic Hall, Jarrett broke through to The Light. After "When I Fall in Love," you wonder that he ever found it necessary to play the piano again.

== Accolades ==
Still Live was nominated for "Best Jazz Instrumental Performance (Group)" at the 31st Annual Grammy Awards (1988), the only Standards trio release to receive a nomination.

== Track listing ==
1. "My Funny Valentine" (Lorenz Hart, Richard Rodgers) - 10:51
2. "Autumn Leaves" (Joseph Kosma, Johnny Mercer, Jacques Prévert) - 10:24
3. "When I Fall in Love" (Edward Heyman, Victor Young) - 8:22
4. "The Song Is You" (Oscar Hammerstein II, Jerome Kern) - 17:33
5. "Come Rain or Come Shine" (Harold Arlen, Johnny Mercer) - 10:06
6. "Late Lament" (Paul Desmond) - 8:40
7. "You and the Night and the Music/Extension" (Howard Dietz, Arthur Schwartz/Keith Jarrett) - 10:44
8. "Intro/Someday My Prince Will Come" (Jarrett/Frank Churchill, Larry Morey) - 8:23
9. "Billie's Bounce" (Charlie Parker) * - 9:06
10. "I Remember Clifford" (Benny Golson) - 4:00

=== Note ===
- *CD bonus track; not included on LP.

== Personnel ==
- Keith Jarrett – piano
- Gary Peacock – bass
- Jack DeJohnette – drums

=== Technical personnel ===
- Manfred Eicher – producer
- Martin Wieland – recording engineer
- Barbara Wojirsch – design
- Rose Anne Colavito – photography
