= The Out-of-Towners (album) =

Live album by Keith Jarrett / Gary Peacock / Jack DeJohnette
- Released: August 30, 2004
- Recorded: July 28, 2001
- Venue: Bavarian State Opera; Munich, Germany
- Genre: Jazz
- Length: 68:07
- Label: ECM; ECM 1900
- Producer: Manfred Eicher

Keith Jarrett chronology
Up for It (2003)	The Out-of-Towners (2004)	Radiance (2005)

Standards trio chronology
Up for It (2003)	The Out-of-Towners (2004)	My Foolish Heart (2007)

The Out-of-Towners is a live album by American jazz pianist Keith Jarrett recorded at the Bavarian State Opera in Munich on July 28, 2001 and released by ECM on August 30, 2004. Jarrett's trio—the Standards trio—features rhythm section Gary Peacock and Jack DeJohnette.

== Background ==
The Out-of-Towners was recorded during the "Standards Trio" Summer 2001 European tour which had eight dates, mostly in France. An earlier date on the tour, recorded at the Montreux Jazz Festival, produced the 2007 album My Foolish Heart.

Summer 2001 tour
Date	Venue	City	Notes
July 16, 2001	Pinède Gould	Juan-les-Pins, France	during the Jazz à Juan festival
July 18, 2001	Palais des congrès	Paris, France	
July 20, 2001		Perugia, Italy	during the Umbria Jazz Festival
July 22, 2001	Stravinsky Hall,	Montreux, Switzerland	during the Montreux Jazz Festival; My Foolish Heart
July 26, 2001	Teatro Malibran	Venice, Italy	
July 28, 2001	Bavarian State Opera	Munich, Germany	
August 1, 2001		La Roque-d'Anthéron, France	
August 3, 2001		Marciac, France	

== Reception ==
Professional ratings
Review scores
Source	Rating
AllMusic	4/5 stars
The Guardian	4/5 stars
The Penguin Guide to Jazz	4/4 stars
All About Jazz	4/5 stars

In a review for AllMusic, Thom Jurek wrote: "Being one of contemporary jazz's longest-running bands has its advantages; one of them is having nothing to prove. First and foremost, this band plays standards like no one else. Given their individual careers, the members playing in a trio that performs classics carries a kind of freedom, as well as weight. This material is treated not as museum-piece jazz, but as the essence of song... Besides the wondrous performance, the sound of this recording should be noted. Its warmth is immediate, its very close and intimate sound makes the listener feel as if she were in the middle of the stage taking this all in, not in the audience. This is an accomplishment on all fronts."

The authors of The Penguin Guide to Jazz wrote: "There is some gloriously upbeat playing, like the blues structure of the title-track, and a stunning version of Mulligan's 'Five Brothers.' Indeed, an album which begins relatively slowly takes off with 'I Love You' before kicking into the superb sequence above." They praised Jarrett's encore, calling it "ballad-playing at its absolute finest and worthy of Bill Evans at his greatest."

Writing for The Guardian, John Fordham commented: "There are six tunes here, prefaced by a solo improvised overture that sounds more like a standard than most standards do, before the pianist picks up the tempo with 'I Can't Believe That You're in Love with Me', and Jack DeJohnette's cymbal beat snaps into life. Then the piece builds through Jarrett's characteristic alternation of spaces and cannily late-arriving bursts of notes. The same thing happens at a gentler tempo on 'You've Changed', also a feature for Gary Peacock's measured lyricism on bass. 'I Love You' is probably the standout conventional uptempo piece in the accelerating whirl of Jarrett's dancing phrasing against the racing engine of the other two.... But the fascinatingly preoccupied, almost abstract blues of the title track displays more layers and implications than any other—from the pianist's minimal, fragmentary blues figures to Peacock's free-associating rejoinders, and DeJohnette's lateral, pattering brushwork. There'd be an argument for saying the disc was worth it for that fascinating interlude alone."

John Kelman, in a review for All About Jazz, stated: "While not a complete show, The Out-of-Towners still comes closest to capturing a complete concert experience by providing free playing along with standards, and even a solo piano piece ... Jarrett's trio has become one of the primary benchmarks for piano trio interplay, and it proves that, as Jarrett has said, 'it's not the material, it's what you bring to the material.' While some have bemoaned the fact that Jarrett appears to have left composition behind, the reality is that with an intuitive interaction that can only come from having played together for over twenty years, Jarrett, Peacock and DeJohnette raise the art of interpretation to a level that defies easy categorization. While they may, for the most part, choose to work existing standards, their playing is so fresh, so vital, that they make each piece sound like a new composition each time they play it."

In an article for ECM blog Between Sound and Space, Tyran Grillo wrote: "Jarrett ... shines at every turn, but his phenomenal rhythm section has rarely sounded more luminescent. Light in their step and playful in their virtuosity, Jarrett's sidemen exude effortlessness."

== Track listing ==
1. "Intro / I Can't Believe That You're in Love with Me" (Clarence Gaskill, McHugh) – 12:10
2. "You've Changed" (Carey, Fischer) – 8:13
3. "I Love You" (Porter) – 10:00
4. "The Out-of-Towners" (Jarrett) – 19:45
5. "Five Brothers" (Gerry Mulligan) – 11:12
6. "It's All in the Game" (Dawes, Sigman) – 6:47

== Personnel ==
=== Musicians ===
- Keith Jarrett – piano
- Gary Peacock – bass
- Jack DeJohnette – drums

=== Technical personnel ===
- Manfred Eicher – producer
- Martin Pearson – recording engineer
- Morten Lund – mastering
- Sascha Kleis – design
- Thomas Wunsch – cover photography
- Wilfried Hösl – liner photography
- Roberto Masotti – trio photography

== Charts ==
Chart (2004)	Peak position
US Billboard Top Jazz Albums	9
