= Bye Bye Blackbird (Keith Jarrett album) =

Studio album / Miles Davis tribute album by the Keith Jarrett Trio
- Released: April 1993
- Recorded: October 12, 1991
- Studio: Power Station, New York City
- Genre: Jazz
- Length: 68:00
- Label: ECM; ECM 1467
- Producer: Manfred Eicher

Keith Jarrett chronology
Vienna Concert (1992)	Bye Bye Blackbird (1993)	Bridge of Light (1994)

Jarrett / Peacock / DeJohnette chronology
The Cure (1991)	Bye Bye Blackbird (1993)	Standards in Norway (1995)

Bye Bye Blackbird is a studio album by the Keith Jarrett Trio recorded on October 12, 1991 in tribute to Miles Davis, who had died two weeks earlier, and released on ECM in April 1993—the first and last studio recording by Jarrett's "Standards Trio", featuring rhythm section Gary Peacock and Jack DeJohnette since their 1983 debut.

== Reception ==
Professional ratings
Review scores
Source	Rating
AllMusic	4.5/5 stars
The Penguin Guide to Jazz	3.5/4 stars

In a review for AllMusic, Richard S. Ginell wrote: "The lonely figure in shadow with a horn on the cover contrasts with the joyous spirit of many of the tracks on this CD, yet there is still a ghostly presence to deal with—and in keeping with Miles' credo, Jarrett's choice of notes is often more purposefully spare than usual. There is symmetry in the organization of the album, with 'Bye Bye Blackbird' opening and the trio's equally jaunty 'Blackbird, Bye Bye' closing the album, and the interior tracks immediately following the former and preceding the latter are 'You Won't Forget Me' and 'I Thought About You'... As an immediate response to a traumatic event, Jarrett and his colleagues strike the right emotional balance to create one of their more meaningful albums."

The authors of The Penguin Guide to Jazz wrote: "Bye Bye Blackbird is a wonderful record. The choice of material is refreshingly unobvious... and immaculately played, as this group always plays. The two originals... are as intensely felt as anything Jarrett has done in recent years, and the level of abstraction that has crept back into the music is well judged and unobtrusive. DeJohnette performs wonders, changing metre subtly with almost every bar on 'Straight No Chaser.' An excellent record, beautifully packaged."

Writing for ECM blog Between Sound and Space, Tyran Grillo commented: "Bye Bye Blackbird sits above the rest for its sheer profundity of expression.... The title opener welcomes us into a nostalgic world, glimpses of what it must have been like to work with Miles. The high-end musings into which the music evolves speak to the ecstasy that any such musician must have felt at those moments of ethereal access. One cannot help but notice how energetic, for the most part, this session is. Between the swinging 'Straight No Chaser' and 'Butch and Butch,' there's more than enough to get excited about."

== Track listing ==
1. "Bye Bye Blackbird" (Ray Henderson, Mort Dixon) – 11:13
2. "You Won't Forget Me" (Kermit Goell, Fred Spielman) – 10:46
3. "Butch and Butch" (Oliver Nelson) – 6:37
4. "Summer Night" (Al Dubin, Harry Warren) – 6:42
5. "For Miles" (Jarrett, Peacock, DeJohnette) – 18:43
6. "Straight No Chaser" (Thelonious Monk) – 6:46
7. "I Thought About You" (Jimmy Van Heusen, Johnny Mercer) – 4:02
8. "Blackbird, Bye Bye" (Jarrett, Peacock, DeJohnette) – 3:02

== Personnel ==
=== Keith Jarrett Trio ===
- Keith Jarrett – piano
- Gary Peacock – bass
- Jack DeJohnette – drums

=== Technical personnel ===
- Manfred Eicher – executive producer
- Jan Erik Kongshaug – mastering engineer
- Jay Newland – recording engineer
- Dieter Rehm – cover design
- Catherine Pichonnier – cover photography
