= Changeless (album) =

Live album by the Keith Jarrett Trio
- Released: October 1989
- Recorded: October 9, 11, 12 & 14, 1987
- Genre: Jazz
- Length: 49:04
- Label: ECM; ECM 1392
- Producer: Manfred Eicher

Keith Jarrett chronology
Personal Mountains (1989)	Changeless (1989)	Paris Concert (1990)

Jarrett / Peacock / DeJohnette chronology
Still Live (1988)	Changeless (1989)	Tribute (1990)

Changeless is a live album by the Keith Jarrett Trio recorded at various venues over a week in October 1987 and released on ECM two years later. The trio—Jarrett's "Standards Trio"—features rhythm section Gary Peacock and Jack DeJohnette.

== October 1987 tour ==
Changeless is a compilation of tracks recorded during the "Standards trio" October 1987 North American tour in which, according to www.keithjarrett.org, offered 14 recitals in 28 days:

- October 3 – Ruth Eckerd Hall, Clearwater, FL, USA
- October 8 – Vanderbilt University, Nashville, TN, USA
- October 9 – Lexington, KY, USA "Lifeline"
- October 11 – Convention Center, Dallas, TX, USA "Endless"
- October 12 – Wortham Center, Houston, TX, USA "Ecstasy"
- October 14 – Paramount Theater, Denver, CO, USA "Dancing"
- October 16 – Zellerbach Hall, UC Berkeley, Berkeley, CA, USA
- October 19 – Northwestern University, Chicago, IL, USA
- October 21 – Flynn Theater, Burlington, VT, USA
- October 23 – Avery Fisher Hall, Lincoln Center, New York, NY, USA
- October 25 – Roy Thomson Hall, Toronto, OT, Canada
- October 27 – Orchestra Hall, Minneapolis, MN, USA
- October 29 – Eastman Theater, Rochester, NY, USA
- October 31 – Hill Auditorium, Ann Arbor, MI, USA
- November 1 – Ann Arbor, MI, USA

== Reception ==
Professional ratings
Review scores
Source	Rating
AllMusic	4/5 stars
The Penguin Guide to Jazz	3.5/4 stars

The AllMusic review by Richard S. Ginell awarded the album 4 stars and states, "This is a triumph, for Jarrett has successfully brought the organically evolving patterns of his solo concerts into the group format ... a genuine collective musical experience."

The authors of The Penguin Guide to Jazz wrote that Changeless contains "original material which is deeply subversive (though also respectfully aware) of the whole tradition of jazz as a system of improvisation on 'the changes'... On Changeless, there are no chord progressions at all; the trio improvises each section in a single key, somewhat in the manner of an Indian raga. The results are impressive and thought-provoking, like everything Jarrett has attempted."

Jarrett biographer Wolfgang Sandner comment of Changeless: "Jarrett had, at last, combined his free-playing techniques with his trio style."

== Track listing ==
All music by Keith Jarrett

1. "Dancing" (Denver) – 9:01
2. "Endless" (Dallas) – 15:32
3. "Lifeline" (Lexington) – 11:32
4. "Ecstacy" (Houston) – 12:59

== Personnel ==
=== Keith Jarrett Trio ===
- Keith Jarrett – piano
- Gary Peacock – bass
- Jack DeJohnette – drums

=== Technical personnel ===
- Manfred Eicher – producer
- Jan Erik Kongshaug – remixing engineer
- Tom McKenney – recording engineer
- Dieter Rehm – design
- Gyokusei Jikihara – painting
