= Standards in Norway =

Live album by Keith Jarrett
- Released: April 1995
- Recorded: October 7, 1989
- Venue: Konserthuset; Oslo, Norway
- Genre: Jazz
- Length: 73:23
- Label: ECM; ECM 1542
- Producer: Manfred Eicher

Keith Jarrett chronology
At the Deer Head Inn (1994)	Standards in Norway (1995)	Keith Jarrett at the Blue Note (1995)

Jarrett / Peacock / DeJohnette chronology
Bye Bye Blackbird (1993)	Standards in Norway (1995)	Keith Jarrett at the Blue Note (1995)

Standards in Norway is a live album by the Keith Jarrett Trio recorded at the Konserthuset in Oslo, Norway, on October 7, 1989 and released by ECM in 1995. The trio—Jarrett's "Standards Trio"—features rhythm section Gary Peacock and Jack DeJohnette.

== October 1989 Tour ==
Standards in Norway was recorded during the "Standards Trio" October 1989 European tour:

- October 1 – Palais des Beaux-Arts, Brussels (Belgium)
- October 3 – Berwaldhallen, Stockholm (Sweden)
- October 5 – Koncertsalen i Tivoli, Copenhagen (Denmark)
- October 7 – Konserthuset, Oslo, Norway (Standards in Norway)
- October 9 – Royal Festival Hall, London (England)
- October 11 – Graf-Zeppelin-Haus, Friedrichshafen (Germany)
- October 15 – Philharmonie, Cologne (Germany) (Tribute)
- October 16 – Philharmonie, Gasteig, Munich (Germany)
- October 18 – Musikhalle, Hamburg (Germany)
- October 19 – Kongreßalle Killesberg, Stuttgart (Germany)
- October 21 – Alte Oper, Frankfurt (Germany)
- October 23 – Palais de la Musique, Strasbourg (France)
- October 25 – Arsenal, Metz (France)
- October 28 – Théâtre des Champs-Elysées, Paris (France)

== Reception ==
Professional ratings
Review scores
Source	Rating
AllMusic	3/5 stars
The Penguin Guide to Jazz	3.5/4 stars

The AllMusic review by Scott Yanow awarded the album 3 stars and states, "none of the eight performances from the concert appearance are throwaways. Jarrett's vocal sounds are more restrained than usual while his piano playing is in peak form."

== Track listing ==
1. "All of You" (Cole Porter) – 8:16
2. "Little Girl Blue" (Lorenz Hart, Richard Rodgers) – 6:44
3. "Just in Time" (Betty Comden, Adolph Green, Jule Styne) – 11:04
4. "Old Folks" (Willard Robison) – 10:42
5. "Love is a Many-Splendored Thing" (Sammy Fain, Paul Francis Webster) – 7:26
6. "Dedicated to You" (Sammy Cahn, Saul Chaplin, Hy Zaret) – 12:19
7. "I Hear a Rhapsody" (Jack Baker, George Fragos, Dick Gasparre) – 10:57
8. "How About You?" (Ralph Freed, Burton Lane) – 5:55

== Personnel ==
=== Keith Jarrett Trio ===
- Keith Jarrett – piano
- Gary Peacock – bass
- Jack DeJohnette – drums

=== Technical Personnel ===
- Manfred Eicher – producer
- Jan Erik Kongshaug – recording engineer
- Barbara Wojirsch – cover design
