= Yesterdays (Keith Jarrett album) =

Live album by Keith Jarrett
- Released: January 2009
- Recorded: April 24 and 30, 2001
- Venue: Metropolitan Festival Hall, Tokyo; Orchard Hall, Tokyo
- Genre: Jazz
- Length: 1:15:37
- Label: ECM; ECM 2060
- Producer: Manfred Eicher, Keith Jarrett and Toshinari Koinuma

Keith Jarrett chronology
My Foolish Heart (2007)	Yesterdays (2009)	Paris / London: Testament (2009)

Jarrett / Peacock / DeJohnette chronology
My Foolish Heart (2007)	Yesterdays (2009)	Somewhere (2013)

Yesterdays is a live jazz album by Keith Jarrett, Gary Peacock, and Jack DeJohnette recorded in concert on April 30, 2001 at the Metropolitan Festival Hall in Tokyo and also at the sound-check recording of April 24, 2001 at the Orchard Hall in Tokyo that would give way to Always Let Me Go. It was released by ECM Records in 2009.

== Reception ==
Professional ratings
Review scores
Source	Rating
AllMusic	4/5 stars
All About Jazz	4.5/5 stars

In a review for AllMusic, Thom Jurek wrote: "What is most remarkable about this band is its sense of balance between eloquence, interplay, improvisational communication, and swing. This group is not only a solid link to the tradition Jarrett, Peacock, and DeJohnette all came up with, but it is a solid teaching pointer as to how to employ standards for the music in the future."

Writing for All About Jazz, John Kelman commented: "No matter how well-heeled some of the material is, there's always a unique charm brought to each release in the trio's growing discography. Jarrett, bassist Gary Peacock, and drummer Jack DeJohnette continue to find new ways to respect the material, all the while keeping it fresh—infused with rarified nuance and an ever-present sound of surprise. The relevance of a good song never fades, as long as there are players who can find new ways to explore its full depth and breadth... This trio may be 25 years old, but Jarrett, Peacock, and DeJohnette are showing absolutely no signs of losing their edge or relevance."

Tyran Grillo, in an article for Between Sound and Space, stated: "Yesterdays follows Always Let Me Go, The Out-of-Towners, and My Foolish Heart... as the fourth and final ECM album recorded during Keith Jarrett, Gary Peacock, and Jack DeJohnette’s inaugural tour of the new millennium. Like beads on a necklace, these albums guide a singular thread, a development of attitude and polish, which colors the music of this enduring trio. Pianist, bassist, and drummer respectively buff another set of standards to a sheen of crystalline ebullience... Track for track, a solid outing, with soft spots in all the right places."

== Track listing ==
1. "Strollin'" (Horace Silver) – 8:12
2. "You Took Advantage of Me" (Rodgers, Hart) – 10:12
3. "Yesterdays" (Kern, Harbach) – 8:55
4. "Shaw'nuff" (Gillespie, Parker) – 6:10
5. "You've Changed" (Fischer, Carey) – 7:55
6. "Scrapple from the Apple" (Parker) – 9:01
7. "A Sleepin' Bee" (Arlen, Capote) – 8:17
8. "Intro / Smoke Gets In Your Eyes" (Jarrett / Kern, Harbach) – 8:47
9. "Stella by Starlight" (Young, Washington) – 8:04

Total playing time: 1:11:20

== Personnel ==
- Keith Jarrett – piano
- Gary Peacock – double bass
- Jack DeJohnette – drums

Production

- Keith Jarrett – producer
- Manfred Eicher – producer, editing & mastering
- Toshinari Koinuma – concert producer
- Yoshihiro Suzuki – engineer (recording)
- Jan Erik Kongshaug – editing & mastering
- Sascha Kleis – design
- Thomas Wunsch – photography (cover)
- Patrick Hinley – photography (liner)
