= Paris Concert (Keith Jarrett album) =

Live album by Keith Jarrett
- Released: April 1990
- Recorded: October 17, 1988
- Venue: Salle Pleyel; Paris, France
- Genre: Jazz
- Length: 50:17
- Label: ECM; ECM 1401
- Producer: Manfred Eicher

Keith Jarrett chronology
Changeless (1989)	Paris Concert (1990)	Tribute (1990)

Keith Jarrett solo piano chronology
Dark Intervals (1988)	Paris Concert (1990)	Vienna Concert (1992)

Professional ratings
Review scores
Source	Rating
AllMusic	4/5 stars
The Penguin Guide to Jazz	2/4 stars

Paris Concert is a live solo album by American jazz pianist Keith Jarrett, recorded at the Salle Pleyel in Paris on October 17, 1988, and released on ECM in April 1990.

== 1988 solo piano concerts ==
In 1988 Jarrett toured Europe two times (June, October) offering 6 solo concerts. Paris Concert was recorded during the second 1988 European mini-tour.

- June 16 – Istanbul (Turkey) during Istanbul International Jazz Festival
- June 20 – Patras (Greece) during Patras International Festival.
- June 23 – Palermo (Italy)
- October 17 – Paris (France)
- October 22 – Brussels (Belgium) during the Belga Jazz Festival
- October 24 – Madrid (Spain) during Festival de Jazz de Madrid

== Reception ==
Richard Lehnert at Stereophile gave the album the "Recording of November 1990" award, stating:

This is Jarrett's most satisfying solo outing since 1982's Concerts.... The gorgeously deep, lush recording is, of course, closely multi-miked, with perhaps even some added reverb. But producer Manfred Eicher does this sort of thing at least as well as did John Culshaw, and probably better than anyone working today. I have no complaints, even if the piano is 12' wide.

The AllMusic review by Richard S. Ginell states, "Jarrett pulls further away from the old rousing (and thoroughly American) gospel, blues and folk roots of earlier concerts toward a more abstract concept.... [His] virtuosic abilities are never in doubt, and he rarely flaunts his technique for its own sake, but one senses that the inspiration level is down; one doesn't come out of the CD all charged up as with many earlier solo concerts."

== Track listing ==
All music by Keith Jarrett except as noted.

1. "October 17, 1988" – 38:23
2. "The Wind" (Russ Freeman, Jerry Gladstone) – 6:32
3. "Blues" – 5:22

== Personnel ==
- Keith Jarrett – piano

=== Technical personnel ===
- Manfred Eicher – producer
- Peter Laenger, Andreas Neubronner – recording engineer
- Barbara Wojirsch – cover design and layout
- Jean-Pierre Larcher – photography
