= After the Fall (Keith Jarrett album) =

Live album by Keith Jarrett
- Released: March 2018
- Recorded: November 14, 1998
- Venues: NJPAC; Newark, New Jersey
- Genre: Jazz
- Length: 1:45:39
- Label: ECM 2590/91
- Producer: Keith Jarrett

Keith Jarrett chronology
A Multitude of Angels (2016)	After the Fall (2018)	La Fenice (2018)

Jarrett / Peacock / DeJohnette chronology
Somewhere (2013)	After the Fall (2018)

Professional ratings
Review scores
Source	Rating
AllMusic	4.5/5 stars
The Times	4/5 stars
PopMatters	7/10 stars
All About Jazz	5/5 stars
Jazz Trail	A
RTÉ.ie	3.75/5
The Australian	3.5/5 stars
The Guardian	4/5 stars
Financial Times	4/5 stars
The Sydney Morning Herald	4/5 stars

After the Fall is a live double album by American jazz pianist Keith Jarrett. Recorded at the New Jersey Performing Arts Center on November 14, 1998, it was released archivally by ECM Records 20 years later. Jarrett's trio features bassist Gary Peacock and drummer Jack DeJohnette.

== Background ==
Chris Pearson of The Times stated "The title refers to Keith Jarrett’s 'fall' into a bout of chronic fatigue syndrome in autumn (or fall) 1996. As the American pianist explains in his sleeve notes, the illness kept him from playing publicly for two years. This concert, recorded near his home in New Jersey, was his first post-recovery attempt to play before an audience. It’s a caveat of sorts, as is its casual capture through the venue’s mixing console. Yet the tape and the trio sound fine."

== Reception ==
Thom Jurek of AllMusic wrote: "This double disc isn't merely a compelling historical document, it is an exemplary concert full of inspired readings of classic jazz tunes ranging from the Great American Songbook through bebop and John Coltrane."

== Track listing ==
Disc one
No.	Title	Writer(s)	Length
1.	"The Masquerade Is Over"	Herb Magidson, Allie Wrubel	15:49
2.	"Scrapple from the Apple"	Charlie Parker	8:46
3.	"Old Folks"	Dedette Lee Hill, Willard Robison	9:23
4.	"Autumn Leaves"	Joseph Kosma, Johnny Mercer, Jacques Prévert	13:17

Disc two
No.	Title	Writer(s)	Length
1.	"Bouncin' with Bud"	Bud Powell, Walter Fuller	10:01
2.	"Doxy"	Sonny Rollins	8:47
3.	"I'll See You Again"	Noël Coward	7:48
4.	"Late Lament"	Paul Desmond	4:58
5.	"One for Majid"	Pete La Roca	6:47
6.	"Santa Claus Is Coming to Town"	Haven Gillespie, John Frederick Coots	7:47
7.	"Moment's Notice"	John Coltrane	6:41
8.	"When I Fall in Love"	Edward Heyman, Victor Young	5:35

== Personnel ==
Band

- Keith Jarrett – piano
- Gary Peacock – double bass
- Jack DeJohnette – drums

Production

- Keith Jarrett – producer, liner notes
- Manfred Eicher – executive producer
- Alain Leduc – recording
- Bernd Kuchenbeiser – design
- Patrick Hinely – photography
- Roberto Masotti – photography

== Charts ==
Chart (2018)	Peak position
Austrian Albums (Ö3 Austria)	31
Belgian Albums (Ultratop Flanders)	117
Belgian Albums (Ultratop Wallonia)	163
French Albums (SNEP)	73
German Albums (Offizielle Top 100)	35
Portuguese Albums (AFP)	15
Swiss Albums (Schweizer Hitparade)	32
