= Bridge of Light (album) =

Studio album by Keith Jarrett
- Released: April 1994
- Recorded: March 1993
- Venue: SUNY Purchase; Purchase, New York
- Genre: Contemporary classical music
- Length: 1:09:32
- Label: ECM New Series; ECM 1450
- Producer: Keith Jarrett and Manfred Eicher

Keith Jarrett chronology
Bye Bye Blackbird (1993)	Bridge of Light (1994)	At the Deer Head Inn (1994)

Keith Jarrett orchestral works chronology
Ritual (1982)	Bridge of Light (1994)

Bridge of Light is a contemporary classical album composed by American jazz pianist and composer Keith Jarrett recorded in March 1993 and released on the ECM New Series April the following year, featuring the Fairfield Orchestra conducted by Thomas Crawford.

== Reception ==
Professional ratings
Review scores
Source	Rating
AllMusic	4/5 stars

The AllMusic review by Richard S. Ginell awarded the album 4 stars, stating:

This is Keith Jarrett's most accomplished collection of classical compositions yet, seated squarely in the American East Coast neo-classical tradition of Samuel Barber, David Diamond, Irving Fine, etc. Jarrett's writing for strings is masterful here; the lines move and interweave instead of being shoveled on as in some pieces of the '70s, and the compositions have shape and direction. Most of all, they share a common feeling of reflection and an unabashed willingness to let the instrumental soloists sing... Though these works have nothing to do with jazz per se, all Jarrett buffs should investigate this music on its own terms.

Writing for jazz.com, Ted Gioia rated "Bridge of Light" 95/100, saying:

One can chart Jarrett's increasing comfort and skill in channeling his musical vision into written scores, and by the time we arrive at Bridge of Light (1990) we have a work that stands comparison with Jarrett's finest jazz music, and does not require his own presence on piano to achieve its sublime effects. The pastoral temperament that infuses much of his piano work rises to the fore here, but is transmuted in shimmering sound colors that sometimes take on an austere neo-medieval cast and elsewhere embrace a rhapsodic immediacy. With an artist so prolific as Jarrett, it is hard to make the claim that he hasn't given us enough music, but I would trade several dozen CDs from my collection for a few more orchestral works of this caliber.

== Track listing ==
All compositions by Keith Jarrett

1. "Elegy for Violin and String Orchestra" (1984) – 14:50
2. "Adagio for Oboe and String Orchestra" (1984) – 9:54
3. "Sonata for Violin and Piano" (1984) – 27:11
  Celebration – 6:15
  Song – 7:00
  Dance – 3:09
  Birth – 8:34
  Dance – 2:13
4. "Bridge of Light for Viola and Orchestra" (1990) – 17:01

== Personnel ==
- Keith Jarrett – piano (track 3)
- Marcia Butler – oboe (track 2)
- Michelle Makarski – violin (tracks 1 & 3)
- Patricia McCarty – viola (track 4)
- Thomas Crawford – conductor (tracks 1, 2 & 4)
  - The Fairfield Orchestra
    - Aloysia Friedmann, Cenovia Cummins, Mary Whitaker, Andrew Schaw, Alexander Vselensky, Heidi Modr, Christopher Cardona, Dana Friedli, Susan Lorentsen, Eric DeGioia, Roxanne Bergrman, Jeffrey Ellenberger, Amy Wright, Peter Kupfer – violins
    - Ah Ling Neu, Adrian Benjamin, KC Still, Caryn Briskin – violas
    - Ted Mook, Maureen McDermott, Benjamin Whittenburg – celli
    - Michael Magee, Neil Garber – basses
    - Adrianne Greenbaum – flute
    - Bendixen – horn
    - Susan Radcliff – trumpet

=== Technical personnel ===
- Keith Jarrett, Manfred Eicher – producer
- Peter Laenger – tonmeister
- Barbara Wojirsch – cover design
- Gene Martin – photographer

== Original notes ==
Original notes by Keith Jarrett can be found in the CD issues:

Music programs are often rife with explanatory notes concerning the technical details of the pieces. This distracts us from entering the state of "listening" and, instead, makes us more likely to live in our head than in our heart. We seem more concerned with whether the program notes make sense than whether we can be touched by the sounds themselves.

Elegy for Violin was written for my maternal grandmother, who was Hungarian and loved music.

The Oboe Adagio was commissioned by the Pasadena Chamber Orchestra and had its first performance there. It juxtaposes pure melody with related counterpoint and is pastoral in essence.

The Violin Sonata was one of those pieces that tested the speed of my pencil against the incoming flow of ideas. In a way, the five movements are related by their seeming un-relatedness.

"Bridge of Light" was commissioned by Patricia McCarty and premiered with the orchestra you hear on this disc. The viola has a big heart and deserves more chances to show it. This piece is a sort of multi-cultural hymn and incidentally demonstrates my love of trumpet and strings.

Actually, all of these pieces are born of a desire to praise and contemplate rather than a desire to "make" or "show" or "demonstrate" something unique. They are, in a certain way, prayers that beauty may remain perceptible despite fashions, intellect, analysis, progress, technology, distractions, "burning issues" of the day, the un-hipness of belief or faith, concert programming, and the unnatural "scene" of "art", the market, lifestyles, etc., etc., etc. I am not attempting to be "clever" in these pieces (or in these notes), I am not attempting to be a composer. I am trying to reveal a state I think is missing in today's world (except, perhaps, in private): a certain state of surrender: surrender to an ongoing harmony in the universe that exists with or without us. Let us let it in.

– Keith Jarrett
