= Sun Bear Concerts =

Box set / Live album by Keith Jarrett
- Released: January 1978
- Recorded: November 5–18, 1976
- Venue: Kyoto, Nagoya, Tokyo, Sapporo and Osaka (Japan)
- Length: 6:37:46
- Label: ECM; ECM 1100
- Producer: Manfred Eicher

Keith Jarrett chronology
Byablue (1977)	Sun Bear Concerts (1978)	My Song (1978)

Keith Jarrett solo piano chronology
Staircase (1977)	Sun Bear Concerts (1978)	G.I. Gurdjieff: Sacred Hymns (1980)

Sun Bear Concerts is a live box set by American jazz pianist Keith Jarrett compiling five solo piano concerts performed over two weeks during his November 1976 tour in Japan and released on ECM in January 1978.

== Background ==
=== November 1976 solo tour in Japan ===
Sun Bear Concerts compiles five of the eight concerts performed on Jarrett's November 1976 solo tour in Japan:

- November 5 – Kaikan Hall, Kyoto
- November 6 – Denki Hall, Fukuoka
- November 8 – Sankei Hall, Osaka
- November 10 – NHK Hall, Tokyo
- November 12 – Aichi Auditorium, Nagoya
- November 14 – Nakano Sun Plaza, Tokyo
- November 16 – Kanagawa Kenmin Hall, Yokohama
- November 18 – Hokkaido Kosei Nenkin Hall, Sapporo

=== Recording ===
In a 1979 interview, Jarrett stated, "I was involved in a very searching period of time when we recorded that, and the music itself was almost a release for the search. I've been thinking—Sun Bear is the only thing I've recorded that runs the gamut of human emotion. I think that if you got to know it well enough, you'd find it all in there someplace."

=== Title ===
Jarrett, as quoted in his biography, explained the title:

On a Japanese tour I saw a sun bear in the zoo, a small bear which really looked friendly and doesn't exist anywhere outside Japan. The next day I asked our Japanese sound engineer about this animal because I remembered its face, a really friendly small face, and he replied, 'Yes, it's a beautiful bear but if you get near enough to him he will knock you three blocks down the road'. I simply liked the idea of an animal that looks as if it would be nice to get near to and which, when you do so, shakes your whole conception of life.

=== Release history ===
The Sun Bear Concerts were originally released as a ten-LP set in January 1978, and re-released in 1989 as a six-CD (and six cassette) box set, with encores from the concerts in Sapporo, Tokyo and Nagoya—the first that the five performances could be heard as a whole.

== Reception ==
Professional ratings
Review scores
Source	Rating
AllMusic	5/5 stars
Encyclopedia of Popular Music	4/5 stars
The Rolling Stone Jazz Record Guide	3/5 stars
The Penguin Guide to Jazz Recordings	3/4 stars
DownBeat	5/5 stars

The AllMusic review by Richard S. Ginell states, "While Sun Bear breaks little ground that his earlier solo piano albums had not already covered, it is nevertheless richly inventive within Jarrett's personal parameter of idioms. If price is not a barrier, the Jarrett devotee need not hesitate". A review by Thom Jurek of the 2021 facsimile edition refers to the album as "a pinnacle of creative invention in Jarrett's voluminous catalog".

Writing for Rolling Stone, Mikal Gilmore remarked, "Nowhere else in his collected works does music seem more effortless and splendid. From the opening phrase onward, it unfolds like an idyllic dream on the border of consciousness, and like the best of dreams – or narratives – you never want it to end. It is, to my mind, one of the few real self-contained epics in Seventies music."

Writing for ECM blog Between Sound and Space, Tyran Grillo commented, "The Sun Bear Concerts prove that not only is Jarrett an unparalleled improviser but a melodician of the highest order. These pieces are consistent in their striking differences, yet all seem couched in a palpable melancholy that is striated with joy. Despite the sheer volume of music that seems to reside in Jarrett's entire physiological being, one gets the sense after listening to these six-and-a-half hours of brilliance that they comprise but a single molecule of creation dissected and slowed to discernible speeds. At least we, at this moment in time, can witness these atomic paths, knowing full well that their beauty lies in an allegiance to silence. Not a single note ever feels out of place, because it has no place to begin with, except as the emblem of that which is gone before it arrives... If you ever buy only one recording of Keith Jarrett, look no further. Then again, why stop here?"

Jarrett biographer Ian Carr called Sun Bear Concerts "a monumental record of Jarrett's work at a crucial stage of his development," and wrote: "there are amazingly few dead or dull patches and all five concerts seem related like a massive suite. The improvisation also seems much more organic than on the earlier live solo albums... There are more new colours and new rhythms... and the music tends to evolve rather than to chop and change. There is a clear sense of ebbing and flowing, and the marvellous dynamics, ranging from triple forte to pianissimo, also enhance this."

Neil Tesser assigned 5 stars to the album in his DownBeat review. He concluded, "Jarrett has once more stepped into the cave of his creative consciousness and brought to light a music of startling power, majesty, and even warmth".

== Track listing ==
=== Original release ===
==== Kyoto, November 5th, 1976 ====
All tracks are written by Keith Jarrett.

Side I
No.	Title	Length
1.	"Part I a"	25:13

Side II
No.	Title	Length
1.	"Part I b"	19:44

Side III
No.	Title	Length
1.	"Part II a"	17:03

Side IV
No.	Title	Length
1.	"Part II b"	18:31

==== Osaka, November 8th, 1976 ====
All tracks are written by Keith Jarrett.

Side I
No.	Title	Length
1.	"Part I a"	19:58

Side II
No.	Title	Length
1.	"Part I b"	19:27

Side III
No.	Title	Length
1.	"Part II a"	21:29

Side IV
No.	Title	Length
1.	"Part II b"	9:40

==== Nagoya, November 12th, 1976 ====
All tracks are written by Keith Jarrett.

Side I
No.	Title	Length
1.	"Part I a"	17:30

Side II
No.	Title	Length
1.	"Part I b"	18:50

Side III
No.	Title	Length
1.	"Part II a"	20:02

Side IV
No.	Title	Length
1.	"Part II b"	24:19

==== Tokyo, November 14th, 1976 ====
All tracks are written by Keith Jarrett.

Side I
No.	Title	Length
1.	"Part I a"	24:34

Side II
No.	Title	Length
1.	"Part I b"	16:07

Side III
No.	Title	Length
1.	"Part II a"	22:08

Side IV
No.	Title	Length
1.	"Part II b"	21:58

==== Sapporo, November 18th, 1976 ====
All tracks are written by Keith Jarrett.

Side I
No.	Title	Length
1.	"Part I a"	22:07

Side II
No.	Title	Length
1.	"Part I b"	19:16

Side III
No.	Title	Length
1.	"Part II a"	26:24

Side IV
No.	Title	Length
1.	"Part II b"	19:16

=== 1989 reissue ===
All tracks are written by Keith Jarrett.

Disc one: Kyoto, November 5th, 1976
No.	Title	Length
1.	"Part I"	43:55
2.	"Part II"	34:05

Disc two: Osaka, November 8th, 1976
No.	Title	Length
1.	"Part I"	38:58
2.	"Part II"	31:09

Disc three: Nagoya, November 12th, 1976
No.	Title	Length
1.	"Part I"	35:36
2.	"Part II"	39:56

Disc four: Tokyo, November 14th, 1976
No.	Title	Length
1.	"Part I"	40:22
2.	"Part II"	35:22

Disc five: Sapporo, November 18th, 1976
No.	Title	Length
1.	"Part I"	40:59
2.	"Part II"	33:55

Disc six: Encores
No.	Title	Length
1.	"Sapporo"	10:56
2.	"Tokyo"	8:23
3.	"Nagoya"	4:03

== Personnel ==
- Keith Jarrett – piano

=== Technical personnel ===
- Manfred Eicher – producer
- Okihino Sugano – recording engineer
- Shinji Ohtsuka – recording engineer
- Barbara Wojirsch – cover design and layout
- Klaus Knaup – photography
- Tadayuki Naitoh – photography
- Akira Aimi – photography
