= My Foolish Heart (Keith Jarrett album) =

Live album by Keith Jarrett / Gary Peacock / Jack DeJohnette
- Released: October 2007
- Recorded: July 22, 2001
- Venue: Stravinski Hall; Montreux Jazz Festival; Montreux, Switzerland
- Genre: Jazz
- Length: 1:48:36
- Label: ECM; ECM 2021/22
- Producer: Manfred Eicher

Keith Jarrett chronology
| The Carnegie Hall Concert (2006) | My Foolish Heart (2007) | Yesterdays (2009) |

Jarrett / Peacock / DeJohnette chronology
| The Out-of-Towners (2004) | My Foolish Heart (2007) | Yesterdays (2009) |

My Foolish Heart is a live double album by American jazz pianist Keith Jarrett, recorded at the Montreux Jazz Festival in Switzerland on July 22, 2001 and released on ECM six years later in October 2007. The trio—Jarrett's "Standards Trio"—features rhythm section Gary Peacock and Jack DeJohnette.

== Summer 2001 Tour ==
My Foolish Heart was recorded during the "Standards trio" Summer 2001 European tour, which also produced The Out-of-Towners (2004):

- July 16 – Pinède Gould, Juan-les-Pins (France) during the Jazz à Juan festival
- July 18 – Palais des Congrès, Paris (France)
- July 20 – Perugia (Italy) during the Umbria Jazz Festival
- July 22 – Stravinsky Hall, Montreux (Switzerland) during the Montreux Jazz Festival (My Foolish Heart)
- July 26 – Teatro Malibran, Venice (Italy)
- July 28 – Bavarian State Opera, Munich (Germany) (The Out-of-Towners)
- August 1 – La Roque d’Antheron (France)
- August 3 – Marciac (France)

== Reception ==
Professional ratings
Review scores
| Source | Rating |
|---|---|
| AllMusic | 4.5/5 stars |
| The Penguin Guide to Jazz | 4/4 stars |

The AllMusic review by Thom Jurek stated: "this document is a mindblower from start to finish, and there are moments when all you can do in response is look at the box slack-jawed and wonder if what you just heard really happened. It did and it does, over and over again. This set is a magical, wondrous moment in the life of a trio when it all comes pouring out as inspiration and mastery."

== Track listing ==
Disc one
| No. | Title | Writer(s) | Length |
|---|---|---|---|
| 1. | "Four" | Miles Davis | 9:09 |
| 2. | "My Foolish Heart" | Ned Washington; Victor Young | 12:25 |
| 3. | "Oleo" | Sonny Rollins | 6:37 |
| 4. | "What's New?" | Johnny Burke; Bob Haggart | 7:54 |
| 5. | "The Song Is You" | Oscar Hammerstein II; Jerome Kern | 7:43 |
| 6. | "Ain't Misbehavin'" | Waller; Harry Brooks; Andy Razaf | 6:41 |

Disc two
| No. | Title | Writer(s) | Length |
|---|---|---|---|
| 1. | "Honeysuckle Rose" | Razaf; Waller | 6:45 |
| 2. | "You Took Advantage of Me" | Lorenz Hart; Richard Rodgers | 8:54 |
| 3. | "Straight, No Chaser" | Thelonious Monk | 10:05 |
| 4. | "Five Brothers" | Gerry Mulligan | 6:36 |
| 5. | "Guess I'll Hang My Tears Out to Dry" | Sammy Cahn; Jule Styne | 11:09 |
| 6. | "Green Dolphin Street" | Bronisław Kaper; Ned Washington | 8:18 |
| 7. | "Only the Lonely" | Cahn; Jimmy Van Heusen | 6:15 |

== Personnel ==
- Keith Jarrett – piano
- Gary Peacock – bass
- Jack DeJohnette – drums

=== Technical personnel ===
- Manfred Eicher – producer
- Martin Pearson – recording engineer
- Sascha Kleis – cover design
- Junichi Hirayama – photography
- Rose Anne Jarrett – photography
