= Invocations / The Moth and the Flame =

Studio album by Keith Jarrett
- Released: May 1981
- Recorded: November 1979; October 1980
- Studios: Tonstudio Bauer; Ludwigsburg, W. Germany; Ottobeuren Abbey; Ottobeuren, W. Germany
- Genre: Improvised music
- Length: 1:22:21
- Labels: ECM; ECM 1201/02
- Producer: Manfred Eicher

Keith Jarrett chronology
| The Celestial Hawk (1980) | Invocations / The Moth and the Flame (1981) | Ritual (1982) |

Keith Jarrett solo piano chronology
| G.I. Gurdjieff: Sacred Hymns (1980) | The Moth and the Flame (1981) | Concerts (1982) |

Invocations / The Moth and the Flame is a solo double album by American jazz pianist Keith Jarrett recorded in October 1980 and November 1979 respectively and released on ECM in May 1981.

== Background ==
=== Invocations ===
Invocations was recorded at the Ottobeuren Abbey on the Karl Joseph Riepp "Trinity" pipe organ, with a soprano saxophone overdubbed on two tracks. Jarrett had recorded Hymns/Spheres (1976) on the same organ four years previously. Regarding the recording date, Jarrett recalled: "Just being in the abbey is quite a frightening experience.... Everything I played ... was extemporaneous, and the two tracks on which I did a soprano-sax over-dub were like minor miracles. It was about forty degrees in there, and my horn felt like an ice cube."

=== The Moth and the Flame ===
The Moth and the Flame is a solo piano suite, recorded on a Steinway at Tonstudio Bauer in Ludwigsburg, West Germany.

== Reception ==
Professional ratings
Review scores
| Source | Rating |
|---|---|
| AllMusic | 3/5 stars |
| The Rolling Stone Jazz Record Guide | 3/5 stars |

The AllMusic review by Richard S. Ginell noted:

If this schizophrenic double-CD set didn't throw Keith Jarrett's most devoted fans for a loop, nothing ever will. Here we have two radically disparate works involving different timbres, attacks and mindsets, both within themselves and with each other. On "Invocations," a seven-movement suite, Jarrett returns to the massive pipe organ in Ottobeuren, Germany for a series of sometimes wildly contrasting episodes... "The Moth and the Flame" finds Jarrett back in a studio with a grand piano, improvising musical still lifes, rambling aimlessly, or doing his rollicking E-flat ostinato thing familiar from the solo concerts. About all that these two pieces share, with the exception of the E-flat movement from "Moth," is an aversion to a jazz pulse, so although there are plenty of rewarding passages here, casual Jarrett browsers are hereby warned.

Writing for The New York Times, Stephen Holden commented, Invocations/The Moth and the Flame "finds the improvisatory pianist-composer at the peak of his powers", and that it offers "a striking aural clarity that is missing on even his most carefully recorded earlier albums. Clarity of tone and dynamic control have always been two of Mr. Jarrett's greatest assets as a pianist. And the new album reveals just how important hearing, as opposed to harmony and compositional structure, is to Mr. Jarrett's spiritually-attuned esthetic." Regarding Invocations, Holden stated that it "conjures a dialogue between earthly and divine forces, as the saxophone calls forth the organ and the two instruments establish a call-and-response dialogue that contrasts the squealing, animal sounds of the horn with the solemn chords of the keyboard... the piece sustains a haunting spiritual atmosphere, while enabling Mr. Jarrett to summon a remarkable variety of sonorities from the two instruments." Concerning The Moth and the Flame, he noted, "the style has more to do with 19th-century Romantic piano literature than with the Bill Evans-influenced popjazz impressionism of earlier albums... The playing is seamless, with the notes cascading in an evenly spaced flow whose fluency and consistency of tone are extraordinary... Enhanced by the digital technology, Mr. Jarrett's chiming, oscillatory pianism has never sounded more impressive."

In an article for ECM blog Between Sound and Space, Tyran Grillo wrote: "In this fascinating double album, a standout even in his extensive résumé, Jarrett fleshes a sparse skeleton with intimate venation... Equal parts hope and doubt, every word both a star and the supernova that ends it, 'Invocations' ranks among Jarrett's most introspective works... 'The Moth and the Flame' floats a thousand pianistic lotuses—and with no less grand a sweep... Jarrett maps out a tessellation of emotion... He winds his way with mirth through every dip of flight... This album, as much as any other in the Jarrett landscape, shows a deep commitment to personal development. He plows these instruments like the fields of his very heart. He is that moth, drawn to a musical flame which, rather than burning him, fuels his humanity all the more."

Jarrett biographer Ian Carr called the album "a superb package," writing, "both albums seem like prayers or invocations for his next musical odyssey." He suggested that the music can be heard as "a summary of Jarrett's recent past—improvised piano and organ albums taken a stage further—and a Janus-like pointer to the future, one indicating the classical repertoire direction, the other anticipating his return to fundamental musical essence... those great sources of inspiration, folk and ethnic music."

== Track listing ==
All music by Keith Jarrett

Disc one: Invocations

1. "Invocations-First (Solo Voice)" - 5:21
2. "Invocations-Second (Mirages, Realities)" - 8:58
3. "Invocations-Third (Power, Resolve)" - 7:32
4. "Invocations-Fourth (Shock, Scatter)" - 6:48
5. "Invocations-Fifth (Recognition)" - 5:04
6. "Invocations-Sixth (Celebration)" - 5:33
7. "Invocations-Seventh (Solo Voice)" - 3:04

Total time: 42:51

Disc two: The Moth and the Flame

1. "The Moth and the Flame Part 1" - 6:58
2. "The Moth and the Flame Part 2" - 5:36
3. "The Moth and the Flame Part 3" - 8:23
4. "The Moth and the Flame Part 4" - 8:07
5. "The Moth and the Flame Part 5" - 9:42

Total time: 39:31

== Personnel ==
- Keith Jarrett – pipe organ (Invocations), soprano saxophone (Invocations), Steinway piano (The Moth and the Flame)

=== Technical personnel ===
- Manfred Eicher – producer
- Martin Wieland – recording engineer
- Barbara Wojirsch – cover design and layout
- Gabor Attalai – cover photography ("Round Fire")
