= Ritual (Keith Jarrett album) =

Studio album by Keith Jarrett
- Released: February 1982
- Recorded: June 1977
- Studio: Tonstudio Bauer; Ludwigsburg, West Germany
- Genre: Contemporary classical music
- Length: 32:02
- Label: ECM 1112
- Producer: Manfred Eicher

Keith Jarrett chronology
Invocations/The Moth and the Flame (1981)	Ritual (1982)	Concerts (1982)

Keith Jarrett orchestral works chronology
The Celestial Hawk (1980)	Ritual (1982)	Bridge of Light (1994)

Ritual is an album of contemporary classical music written by Keith Jarrett and performed by Dennis Russell Davies on solo piano in June 1977 and released on ECM in February 1982.

== Original notes ==
In the original notes for the CD release, pianist Dennis Russell Davies wrote about his relationship with Jarrett, his music, and how this project came about:

I first worked with Keith Jarrett while conducting a program of new music with The Ensemble at New York’s Lincoln Center in 1974. On this occasion, Keith played the solo part in Carla Bley’s "3/4". Aside from his enormous improvisatory skills, I was most impressed by his love for and playing of the concert grand piano, and what I sensed was a growing impatience with the electronic sound sources that seemed poised to take over not only jazz, but so-called "serious" new music as well.

I felt that a collaboration between Keith and my orchestra at that time, the St. Paul Chamber Orchestra, would be an ideal way to explore the potential of combining Keith’s instrumental approach with that of a traditional chamber orchestra, particularly one with proven abilities in the music of our time.

During one of several intense rehearsal periods together, Keith—who had heard my own piano playing—mentioned a new work, "Ritual", that he wanted me to perform.

As I worked with the piece, I received enormous satisfaction from the opportunity to express, through Keith’s music, my admiration for his artistry. And although I could never, in improvisation, begin to assume his qualities as a creative force, "Ritual" is a vehicle through which I can bring his spirit to the listener.

Those who know Keith will hear him in this music—it couldn’t have been written by anyone else.

== Reception ==
Professional ratings
Review scores
Source	Rating
AllMusic	3/5 stars

The AllMusic review by Richard S. Ginell noted, "Ritual has several of the characteristics of Jarrett's solo improvisations—the repetitive vamps and ostinatos, wistful lyricism, ruminative episodes developing organically out of what preceded them—but without the jazzy/bluesy feeling that runs through the solo concerts. Also, the piece begins in a mournful way unusual for the usually optimistic Jarrett. In any case, it is a thoughtful, absorbing composition, thoroughly tonal harmonically, played with assured technique and appropriate use of classical expressive devices by Davies. Classical listeners as well as Jarrett devotees will find much to savor here."

== Track listing ==
All tracks are written by Keith Jarrett.

Side one
No.	Title	Length
1.	"Ritual"	18:37

Side two
No.	Title	Length
1.	"Ritual"	13:25
Total length:		32:02

== Personnel ==
- Dennis Russell Davies – piano

== Technical Personnel ==
- Martin Wieland - recording engineer
- Signe Mähler - cover Photo
- Madeline Winkler-Betzendahl - liner photo
- Barbara Worjirsch - design
- Manfred Eicher - production
