= Jasmine (album) =

Studio album by Keith Jarrett and Charlie Haden
- Released: May 12, 2010
- Recorded: March 2007
- Studio: Cavelight Studio (Keith Jarrett's home studio, Oxford Township)
- Genre: Jazz
- Label: ECM; ECM 2165
- Producer: Keith Jarrett, Manfred Eicher

Keith Jarrett albums chronology
Paris / London: Testament (2009)	Jasmine (2010)	Rio (2011)

Charlie Haden chronology
Rambling Boy (2008)	Jasmine (2010)	Sophisticated Ladies (2010)

Professional ratings
Review scores
Source	Rating
Allmusic	4/5 stars
All About Jazz	4.5/5 stars
DownBeat	4/5 stars
Financial Times	4/5 stars
The Guardian	4/5 stars
Los Angeles Times	3/4 stars
Slant	3.5/5 stars
Time Out	5/5

Jasmine is a 2010 duet album by American pianist Keith Jarrett and bassist Charlie Haden. It was released on 12 May 2010. The album was recorded in March 2007 at Jarrett's home studio in Oxford Township, New Jersey during the recording of a documentary about Haden. Additional tracks from the same session, including alternate takes of "Where Can I Go Without You" and "Goodbye", were released in 2014 on Last Dance.

In the album liner notes, Jarrett wrote: "This recording was done in my small studio. It has very dry sound and we didn't want to have the recording sound like anything but exactly what we were hearing while we played. So it is direct and straightforward... We did not rehearse per se, but went over chords when necessary... We had not played in over thirty years, but something magical happened and I then invited Charlie and his wife to the house to do some playing for a few days with no assurance that we'd have anything (including sound) that we'd want to release." He continued: "Jasmine is a night-blooming flower with a beautiful fragrance and I hope you can hear what went into this, as there is no way to do anything as touching as this by rehearsing it until it dies. This is spontaneous music made on the spot without any preparation save our dedication throughout our lives that we won't accept a substitute: it's either the real thing or it's nothing. It's either real life, or it's a cartoon... These are great love songs played by players who are trying, mostly, to keep the message intact. I hope you can hear it the way we did."

== Reception ==
In a review for AllMusic, Thom Jurek stated: "Jasmine is a collection of love songs; most are standards played by two stellar improvisers. Picking out highlights on this eight-song, hour-long set is difficult because the dry warmth of these performances is multiplied by deeply intuitive listening and the near symbiotic, telepathic nature of the playing. The entire proceeding flows seamlessly... Jasmine is, ultimately, jazz distilled to its most essential; it not only expresses emotion and beauty, but discovers them in every moment of its performance."

Robert L. Doerschuk, in a review for DownBeat, remarked: "depth is what Jasmine is all about. Jarrett and Haden play with what might be described as awesome restraint, given the razzle and dazzle each could have brought to the table, with Haden in his familiar mode of playing sparely, sometimes investing each note with a weighty grace... It feels almost corny to describe what [Jarrett]'s doing as beautiful, because beauty has become either less of a priority or a cynical synonym for trendy. And yet beautiful is just what these moments are."

Writing for the BBC, John Eyles called the album a "noteworthy and historic release", and commented: "Throughout the album, their playing radiates the pair's spontaneous enjoyment of each other’s company and of the songs. Although it may not be a word immediately associated with either of them, Jarrett and Haden sound as if they are having fun here. Both are now respected elder statesmen of jazz, long ago assured of their place in history and each with albums on those lists of 'essentials'. It may not be too long until Jasmine itself appears on such lists.

In a review for Slant Magazine, Jesse Cataldo stated: "About as cleanly resplendent as music comes, Jasmine... is whisper-quiet, but not necessarily simple... the album registers a kind of bare exquisiteness through hushed conversation between the two instruments... The album also proves, as an antidote to the work of aging standards abusers like Rod Stewart, that retrospective late-career reinterpretation doesn’t necessarily equal creative death. The changes Jarrett and Haden make to Jasmine's source material are small and delicate, but their resistance to flaunting internal beauty only makes the album more remarkable."

John Kelman, in a review for All About Jazz, wrote: "Over the course of three decades, much has changed, but some things have remained. Both players have largely become interpreters rather than composers, although Jarrett has rightfully argued that interpretation is composition. Still, their empathic approach to this ballad-heavy set... remains as profound as it was when they were collaborating regularly... Recorded in Jarrett's small home studio, it feels like it was recorded in a living room, with both players at ease, turning a group of nine well-loved, well-known songs into informal conversations, where individual spotlights shine occasionally, but are far more often about gentle give-and-take, lyrical spontaneity and nothing-to-prove economy."

Tyran Grillo of Between Sound and Space commented: "This album proves that maturity is about filtering out all that distracts us from being who we are and finding just the right melody, taking comfort in the method over the message. The title of the first track, 'For All We Know,' says it all. That two musicians, walking such different paths, can come together and create something so powerfully understated, so viscerally unfettered, is a testament to the creative potential of knowledge and the gift of life that allows it... It is a heartfelt meditation on the philosophy of experience, a direct statement regarding the lives of its performers. This album might as well be called 'Jazzmine,' for that's exactly what it is: a mine of tried-and-true standards, each plucked carefully from the surrounding rock and arranged in a row of sparkling gems... Over thirty years in the making, Jasmine was already a classic before Jarrett and Haden ever stepped into the studio to record it. It is as if the music had already existed and our dynamic duo merely needed to catch up with it... This is an album in the past tense, every sound a memory caught in the branches of our curiosity... They're not trying to break new ground here, but to see what can still be built upon the old ground before it disappears. And why not, for their materials are still resilient, pliant, and reliable. Listen to Jasmine for its quiet charm, for the way it sings without words, for the tireless care it embodies, but above all listen to discover just how honest music can be."

== Track listing ==
1. "For All We Know" (J. Fred Coots, Sam M. Lewis) – 9:49
2. "Where Can I Go Without You" (Peggy Lee, Victor Young) – 9:24
3. "No Moon at All" (Redd Evans, David A. Mann) – 4:41
4. "One Day I'll Fly Away" (Will Jennings, Joe Sample) – 4:18
5. "Intro/I'm Gonna Laugh You Right Out of My Life" (Cy Coleman, Joseph McCarthy) – 12:11
6. "Body and Soul" (Frank Eyton, Johnny Green, Edward Heyman, Robert Sour) – 11:12
7. "Goodbye" (Gordon Jenkins) – 8:03
8. "Don't Ever Leave Me" (Oscar Hammerstein II, Jerome Kern) – 3:11

== Personnel ==
Musicians

- Keith Jarrett – piano
- Charlie Haden – double bass

Production

- Keith Jarrett – recording producer
- Manfred Eicher – executive producer, mastering
- Martin Pearson – engineer
- Christoph Stickel – mastering
- Sascha Kleis – design
- Mayo Bucher – cover artwork
- Rose Anne Jarrett – photography
