= Sacred Hymns =

Studio album by Keith Jarrett
- Released: September 1980
- Recorded: March 1980
- Studio: Tonstudio Bauer; Ludwigsburg, W. Germany
- Genre: Classical music
- Length: 50:56
- Label: ECM 1174
- Producer: Manfred Eicher

Keith Jarrett chronology
Nude Ants (1980)	Sacred Hymns (1980)	The Celestial Hawk (1980)

Keith Jarrett solo piano chronology
Sun Bear Concerts (1978)	Sacred Hymns (1980)	The Moth and the Flame (1981)

Sacred Hymns is an album by pianist Keith Jarrett recorded in March 1980 and released on ECM in September of that year, featuring solo piano performances of the sacred hymns of George Gurdjieff and Thomas de Hartmann.

== Background ==
Jarrett's interest in Gurdjieff dated back to the 1960s and his association with Charles Lloyd, who was "on a Gurdjieff kick" at the time, and whose copies of Gurdjieff's books Jarrett read. Jarrett eventually immersed himself in Gurdjieff's writings and music, the latter having been transcribed by Russian composer Thomas de Hartmann. At some point, a member of the London Gurdjieff Foundation suggested that Jarrett record some of Gurdjieff's music, and Jarrett accepted. The resulting recording marked the first occasion on which Gurdjieff's music, as notated by de Hartmann, was made available to the public, and was a major catalyst in bringing the music to the attention of a mainstream audience.

Jarrett later reflected: "It was the most appropriate thing for me to record at the time, given that I knew more about it than just the music, and also given that I was asked by [a member of] the London group whether I would do it or not. That was enough for me. But it was also an exercise in disappearing personality. In the so-called Gurdjieff world, personality is not a positive thing... So I used that recording as an exercise in not inflicting that music with my personality." Jarrett abstained almost completely from the use of improvisation on the album. He stopped reading Gurdjieff's writings in the early 1980s, but stated: "the impression shouldn't be that I have at some point or other refuted it."

== Reception ==
Professional ratings
Review scores
Source	Rating
AllMusic	3/5 stars
The Penguin Guide to Jazz	2/4 stars

Richard S. Ginell's review on AllMusic noted: "The whole record has a serene dignity, even at its loudest levels, that gets to you, and that should be enough for the devout Jarrett following. As for others... well, it's definitely not a top ten choice for a basic Jarrett collection."

== Track listing ==
All compositions by George Ivanovich Gurdjieff and Thomas de Hartmann

1. "Reading of Sacred Books" – 8:19
2. "Prayer and Despair" – 3:50
3. "Religious Ceremony" – 4:07
4. "Hymn" – 2:45
5. "Orthodox Hymn from Asia Minor" – 3:04
6. "Hymn for Good Friday" – 1:35
7. "Hymn" – 2:30
8. "Hymn for Easter Thursday" – 3:26
9. "Hymn to the Endless Creator" – 2:04
10. "Hymn from a Great Temple" – 4:30
11. "The Story of the Resurrection Of Christ" – 1:37
12. "Holy Affirming – Holy Denying – Holy Reconciling" – 4:14
13. "Easter Night Procession" – 2:54
14. "Easter Hymn" – 5:49
15. "Meditation" – 1:42

== Personnel ==
- Keith Jarrett – piano

=== Production ===
- Manfred Eicher – producer
- Kathelin Hoffman – research and co-ordination
- Martin Wieland – recording engineer
- Barbara Wojirsch – cover design and layout
