= Dark Intervals =

Live album by Keith Jarrett
- Released: October 1988
- Recorded: April 11, 1987
- Venue: Suntory Hall; Tokyo, Japan
- Length: 58:16
- Label: ECM; ECM 1379
- Producer: Manfred Eicher

Keith Jarrett chronology
Still Live (1988)	Dark Intervals (1988)	Personal Mountains (1989)

Keith Jarrett solo piano chronology
Concerts (1982)	Dark Intervals (1988)	Paris Concert (1990)

Dark Intervals is a live solo album by American jazz pianist Keith Jarrett recorded at the Suntory Hall in Tokyo on April 11, 1987 and released on ECM the following year.

== 1987 solo concerts ==
Dark Intervals was recorded during the Japan leg of Jarrett's 1987 solo tour playing nine concerts in the U.S., Japan and Brazil.

- March 7 - New York City (USA)
- March 27 - New York City (USA)
- April 5 - San Francisco (USA)
- April 11 - Tokyo (Japan)
- April 12 - Tokyo (Japan)
- April 14 - Tokyo (Japan) [Jarrett performing standards; DVD edition in NTSC format only]
- May 24 - Rio de Janeiro (Brazil)
- May 28 - Sao Paulo (Brazil)
- May 31 - Rio de Janeiro (Brazil)

== Reception ==
Professional ratings
Review scores
Source	Rating
AllMusic	3/5 stars
The Penguin Guide to Jazz Recordings	2/4 stars

Down Beat author Josef Woodard, on his introductory notes to a 1989 Jarrett interview, states that:

Dark Intervals, particularly, is a testament to Jarrett’s recent objective of broadening his scope while paring down to the essence of music—and being. So, while he plots courses in parallel universes—planning to record Bach’s Goldberg Variations on harpsichord and new works by Lou Harrison and Alan Hohvaness in the classical world, and reviving jazz standards in his trio—Jarrett is also searching for new meaning in a basic E minor chord. He’s thinking about the river’s source as well as its effects.

The Stereophile review by Richard Lehnert gave the album the "Recording of March 1989" award, stating:

This album of often profound beauty, had it been released by anyone else, would call for much more acclaim; as it is, it's just another Jarrett solo masterpiece in the tradition of Staircase and The Moth and the Flame. The CD's DDD sound is some of the most natural solo piano sound I've heard (assuming you listen with your ears nearly touching the soundboard), entirely without harshness or glare. But, good as the CD is, the LP is better in the usual ways—deeper, rounder, more full, with greater three-dimensionality."

The AllMusic review by Richard S. Ginell awarded the album 3 stars and states that, "it sounds like a formal recital of individual compositions [...] Keith is often in an introspective, even dark mood [...] The Jarrett devotee will want this; others should use caution". A review in The New York Times called Jarrett's playing on this album "more spare and austere than on his 1975 solo masterpiece The Köln Concert."

== Track listing ==
All compositions by Keith Jarrett

1. "Opening" - 12:53
2. "Hymn" - 4:58
3. "Americana" - 7:12
4. "Entrance" - 2:55
5. "Parallels" - 4:58
6. "Fire Dance" - 6:51
7. "Ritual Prayer" - 7:12
8. "Recitative" - 11:17

== Personnel ==
- Keith Jarrett – piano

=== Technical personnel ===
- Manfred Eicher – producer
- Kimion Oikawa – recording engineer
- Barbara Wojirsch – cover design and layout
- Christian Vogt – cover photography

== Original liner notes ==
The original liner notes state:

Touch is only possible at the edge of spaces. Light is only precious during dark intervals.
