= Concerts (Keith Jarrett album) =

Live album by Keith Jarrett
- Released: September 1982
- Recorded: May 28, 1981 (Bregenz); June 2, 1981 (Munich)
- Venue: Festspielhaus, Bregenz (Austria); Herkulessaal der Residenz, Munich (Germany)
- Label: ECM; ECM 1227–29
- Producer: Manfred Eicher

Keith Jarrett chronology
Ritual (1982)	Concerts (1982)	Standards, Vol. 1 (1983)

Keith Jarrett solo piano chronology
The Moth and the Flame (1981)	Concerts (1982)	Dark Intervals (1988)

Concerts is a live solo triple album of by American jazz pianist Keith Jarrett recorded at the Festspielhaus in Bregenz, Austria on May 28, 1981, and the Herkulessaal in Munich, West Germany on June 2, 1981, and released on ECM in September of the following year.

== Reception ==
The AllMusic review by Richard S. Ginell states, "This set is not to be confused with the earlier, more consistently inspired Solo Concerts triple album which made Jarrett a star, yet the pianist was far from tapped out in these performances. Jarrett is often in his best lyrically funky form... this is far more interesting and elevated music-making than that of the New Age navel-gazing imitators cropping up in Jarrett's wake in the early '80s."

Professional ratings
Review scores
Source	Rating
AllMusic	3/5 stars
The Penguin Guide to Jazz	3/4 stars

== Track listing ==
=== Bregenz, May 28, 1981 ===
All tracks are written by Keith Jarrett.

Side I
No.	Title	Length
1.	"Part I"	21:54

Side II
No.	Title	Length
1.	"Part II"	12:04
2.	"Untitled"	9:30
3.	"Heartland"	6:03

=== München, June 2, 1981 ===
All tracks are written by Keith Jarrett.

Side III
No.	Title	Length
1.	"Part I"	23:22

Side IV
No.	Title	Length
1.	"Part II"	23:32

Side V
No.	Title	Length
1.	"Part III"	26:29

Side VI
No.	Title	Length
1.	"Part IV"	11:38
2.	"Mon cœur est rouge"	7:1
3.	"Heartland"	6:11

=== Note ===
- Discs one and two were released individually as ECM 1227 and ECM 1228, respectively, with the same title and cover. The triple album was issued on CD in 2013.

== Personnel ==
- Keith Jarrett – piano

=== Technical personnel ===
- Manfred Eicher – producer
- Martin Wieland – recording engineer
- Sascha Kleis – cover design and layout
