= Hymns/Spheres =

1976 solo double album by Keith Jarrett

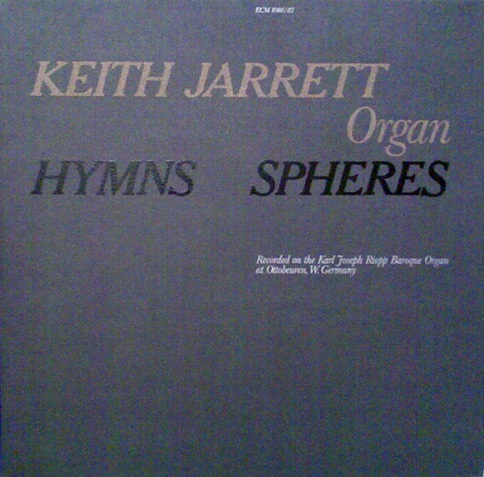

Studio album by Keith Jarrett
- Released: 1976
- Recorded: September 1976
- Studio: Ottobeuren Abbey; Ottobeuren, W. Germany
- Genre: Jazz
- Length: 1:33:39
- Label: ECM; ECM 1086/87 ST
- Producer: Manfred Eicher

Keith Jarrett chronology
Shades (1976)	Hymns/Spheres (1976)	The Survivors' Suite (1977)

Hymns/Spheres is a solo double album by jazz pianist Keith Jarrett recorded on the Karl Joseph Riepp "Trinity" Baroque pipe organ at the Benedictine Abbey in Ottobeuren in September 1976 and released on ECM later that year.

In October 1980, Jarrett would return to the Ottobeuren Abbey to record Invocations on the same organ.

== Recording ==
The original liner notes state:

These improvisations were recorded on the "Trinity Organ", the larger of the two Karl Joseph Riepp (1710–1775) organs at the Benedictine Abbey Ottobeuren.

No overdubs, technical ornamentations or additions were utilized, only the pure sound of the organ in the abbey is heard.

Many of the unique effects, although never before used, were accomplished by pulling certain stops part way, while others remain completely open or closed.

Amazingly, baroque organs have always had this capability.

== Reception ==
Professional ratings
Review scores
Source	Rating
AllMusic	2/5 stars
The Rolling Stone Jazz Record Guide	3/5 stars
All About Jazz	4.5/5 stars

In a review for AllMusic, Richard S. Ginell wrote:

Restlessly searching out new territory for improvisations, Keith Jarrett tackles the massive Karl Joseph Riepp "Trinity" Baroque pipe organ at the Benedictine Abbey in Ottobeuren, Germany... The devotee of Jarrett's piano will quickly discover that his organ idiom has nothing to do with his piano performances; he likes slow-moving, pulseless, sometimes dissonant, sometimes reverent or ecstatic smears of sound (which makes practical sense in the hugely reverberant churches where pipe organs are found). In the ninth movement, Jarrett can fool you into thinking that he is playing floating electronic space music (on an 18th-century organ!). Yet if one must apply a category, despite the improvisatory element, this double-LP is contemporary classical organ music, much closer to that of Olivier Messiaen than anything in the jazz world—and only intermittently as striking."

Writing for All About Jazz, John Kelman commented:

"Jarrett's solo improvisations have always possessed an inherent spirituality but, performed on baroque organ, rarely has it been so far to the fore. The two hymns are particularly majestic, and if Jarrett's reputation as a fearless improvisational explorer was already established by 1976, the many stops available on this baroque organ allowed him to experiment with sound as well, making Hymns/Spheres as wondrous sonically as it is a high point in the ongoing evolution of Jarrett's extemporaneous acumen.... [Hymns/Spheres is] one of Jarrett's most significant recordings in its demonstration that, for this intrepid improviser, nothing is forbidden...and everything is possible."

Will Layman, in an article for PopMatters, asks, "Is it indulgent? Sure. But we're lucky to have this kind of indulgence from an artist as interesting as Keith Jarrett. Heard again, apart from all the egotism that seemed characteristic of Jarrett in 1976, Hymns/Spheres is daring and risky and fascinating. Not essential or even characteristic of Jarrett, except in showing that great artists tend to go beyond what's easy."

In an essay for ECM blog Between Sound and Space, Tyran Grillo wrote: "Hymns/Spheres... documents an encounter with a grand Baroque organ that seems written in the stars... Trying to describe it is like painting every leaf on a tree: far easier to take a photograph and offer it in place of an inferior rendering... this music will never be complete. Its hints of infinity are overwhelming, and we are fortunate enough to know their touch in any form."

== In popular culture ==
The 3rd movement was featured in the movie Sorcerer.

== Track listing ==
All tracks are written by Keith Jarrett.

Side I
No.	Title	Length
1.	"Hymn of Remembrance"	4:02
2.	"Spheres (1st Movement)"	7:40
3.	"Spheres (2nd Movement)"	12:59
Total length:		21:41

Side II
No.	Title	Length
1.	"Spheres (3rd Movement)"	10:13
2.	"Spheres (4th Movement)"	12:20
Total length:		22:33

Side III
No.	Title	Length
1.	"Spheres (5th Movement)"	4:34
2.	"Spheres (6th Movement)"	11:25
3.	"Spheres (7th Movement)"	8:16
Total length:		24:15

Side IV
No.	Title	Length
1.	"Spheres (8th Movement)"	5:18
2.	"Spheres (9th Movement)"	12:06
3.	"Hymn of Release"	4:05
Total length:		21:29 1:29:58

=== Notes ===
- Reissued on CD in 2013

== Spheres ==
Spheres
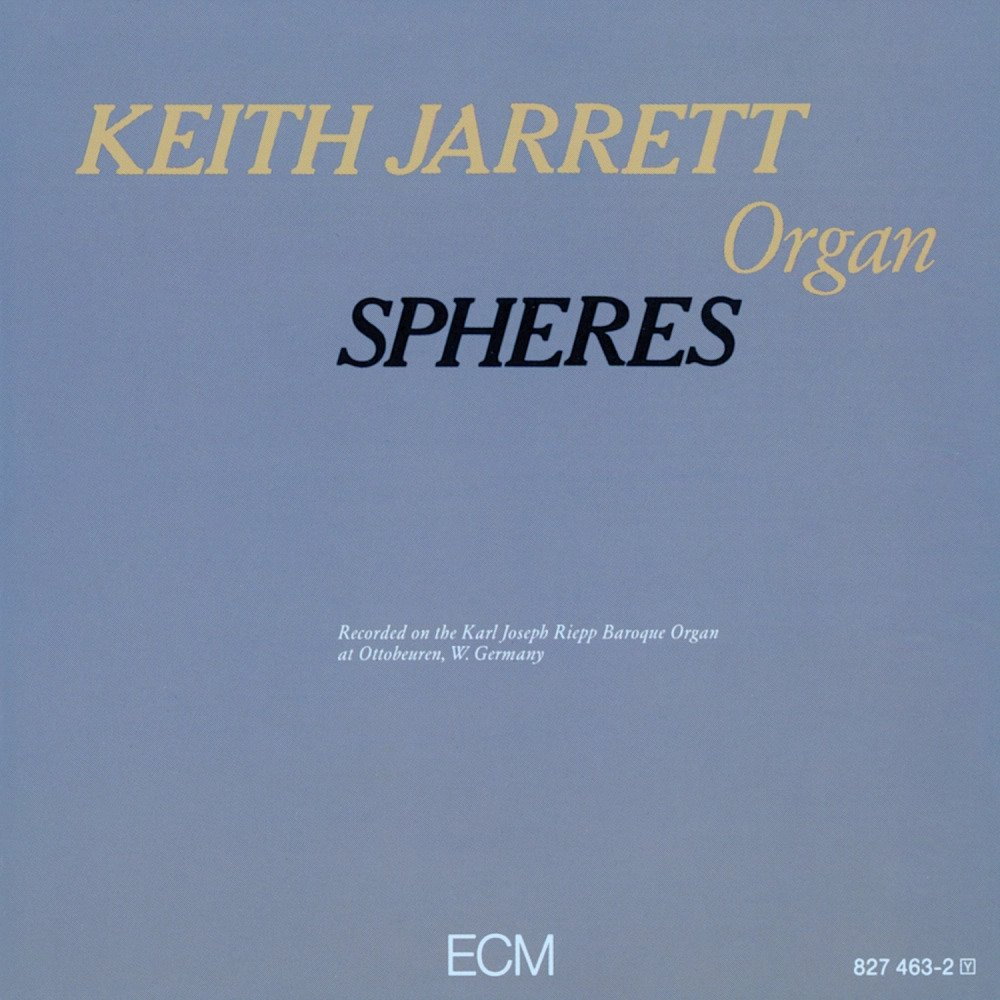

Compilation album by Keith Jarrett
- Released: April 1985
- Recorded: September 1976
- Studio: Ottobeuren Abbey; Ottobeuren, W. Germany
- Genre: Jazz
- Length: 40:38
- Label: ECM; ECM 1302
- Producer: Manfred Eicher

Keith Jarrett chronology
Standards, Vol. 2 (1985)	Spheres (1985)	Standards Live (1986)

Spheres is a compilation album by jazz pianist Keith Jarrett of selected recording from Hymns/Spheres recorded on the Karl Joseph Riepp "Trinity" Baroque pipe organ at the Benedictine Abbey in Ottobeuren in September 1976 and released on ECM in April 1985.

== Reception ==
Professional ratings
Review scores
Source	Rating
AllMusic	3/5 stars

The AllMusic review by Ron Wynn states simply, "1988 reissue of 1976 date that's among his worst."

== Track listing ==
No.	Title	Length
1.	"Spheres (1st Movement)"	7:40
2.	"Spheres (4th Movement)"	12:20
3.	"Spheres (7th Movement)"	8:16
4.	"Spheres (9th Movement)"	12:06

== Personnel ==
- Keith Jarrett – pipe organ

=== Technical personnel ===
- Manfred Eicher – producer
- Martin Wieland – recording engineer
- Roberto Masotti – photography
- Barbara Wojirsch – cover design and layout
