= Paris / London: Testament =

Live album by Keith Jarrett
- Released: October 2009
- Recorded: 26 November 2008; 1 December 2008
- Venue: Salle Pleyel, Paris (France); Royal Festival Hall, London (UK)
- Length: 2:42:28
- Label: ECM; ECM 2130/32
- Producer: Manfred Eicher

Keith Jarrett chronology
Yesterdays (2009)	Paris / London: Testament (2009)	Jasmine (2010)

Keith Jarrett solo piano chronology
The Carnegie Hall Concert (2006)	Paris / London: Testament (2009)	Rio (2011)

Paris / London: Testament is a live solo piano album by American pianist Keith Jarrett, recorded at the Salle Pleyel in Paris 26 November 2008 and the Royal Festival Hall in London the next week on December first, and released as a three CD set on ECM in October the following year.

== Reception ==
Professional ratings
Review scores
Source	Rating
All About Jazz #1	4.5/5 stars
All About Jazz #2	4.5/5 stars
Jazzwise	5/5 stars
The Guardian	4/5 stars

In a review for All About Jazz, Mark Corroto wrote: "The attraction here—and with all of Jarrett's original music—is his emotional effort. He is always able to convey feeling in his playing, from the fervid to the sentimental, the passionate to the giddy; or maybe, perhaps, those are just listener responses to his playing... Unlike the marathon pieces he attempted in the now-distant past, these tracks—all simply numbered and ranging from just under four minutes to nearly fourteen—are dense, consumable brilliance. Maybe the effects of the chronic fatigue syndrome are still with him, but these smaller blocks of improvisation clearly demonstrate Jarrett's enthusiasm for playing. He seems to be reacting more to the audience's response and presence, playing into the attendees' desire to make these shows a positive and supportive experience."

John Kelman, in a separate review for All About Jazz, stated: "it's a testament to Jarrett's remarkable talent that each performance sounds fresh; distanced from each other but coming, unmistakably, from a single voice... Testament – Paris / London is yet another high water mark for Jarrett, and all the more remarkable considering how many solo performances he's already released. We may never truly know why Jarrett chooses to release one concert over another, but as long as he continues to deliver performances this stellar, perhaps it's a question that really doesn't need to be answered."

John Fordham, writing for The Guardian, called the album "another comprehensive offering of fine Jarrett detail for those who don't want to miss a note of the gifted guru's work," and commented: "Foot-stamping groovers built out of undulating chords, gospel themes turning into abstract treble daydreams, thundering free-jazz odysseys, mercurial bebop, fragile, spacey ballads – all of Jarrett's encyclopaedic improv resources are drawn on, and if two-and-a-half hours of it might seem to be too much for all but the faithful, the sense of being steadily drawn into a personal meditative space rather than a piano concert alone is a very seductive one."

In an article at Something Else Reviews, S. Victor Aaron remarked: "Testament Paris/London marked a continuation of Jarrett's striking tightrope walks without a net, beginning with his first ECM album, Facing You from 1971. While he doesn't do this kind of high-wire act quite as often as he used to, that remains an important part of Keith Jarrett's vast legacy – and this album showed he was still capable of building upon it."

Writing for Between Sound and Space, Tyran Grillo commented: "Over a glorious 70 minutes of music in eight parts, Jarrett works an asana of fixation and letting go and touches hand to heart in sporadic gestures of deference. Like water set to boil but which is turned down at the last moment, it skirts the edge of conversion from liquid to gas. At some moments Jarrett's spontaneous motifs funnel into a single dream of flight, realized in his unbridled feeling for thermals that only he can see... Jarrett knows the piano like he knows his own voice; for him they are one and the same. He does not surrender to what he creates, for surrender implies an advantage of which to be taken. The beauty of it all is that one need listen only once to live off the memory for a lifetime."

== Track listing ==
All music by Keith Jarrett

Disc #1: Paris, November 26, 2008

1. Part I – 13:48
2. Part II – 10:36
3. Part III – 7:05
4. Part IV – 5:33
5. Part V – 8:46
6. Part VI – 6:30
7. Part VII – 6:59
8. Part VIII – 10:11

Disc #2: London, December 1, 2008

1. Part I – 11:09
2. Part II – 8:10
3. Part III – 6:50
4. Part IV – 5:58
5. Part V – 10:34
6. Part VI – 6:52

Disc #3: London, December 1, 2008

1. Part VII – 9:00
2. Part VIII – 8:01
3. Part IX – 3:56
4. Part X – 5:35
5. Part XI – 8:26
6. Part XII – 8:30

== Personnel ==
- Keith Jarrett – piano

Production

- Keith Jarrett – producer
- Manfred Eicher – executive producer
- Martin Pearson – engineer (recording)
- Sascha Kleis – design
- Juan Hitters – photography (cover)
- Rose Anne Jarrett – photography (Keith Jarrett)
