= Sleeper (Keith Jarrett album) =

Live album by Keith Jarrett
- Released: July 2012
- Recorded: April 16, 1979
- Venues: Nakano Sun Plaza; Tokyo, Japan
- Genre: Jazz
- Length: 1:46:53
- Labels: ECM; ECM 2290/91
- Producer: Manfred Eicher

Keith Jarrett chronology
Rio (2011)	Sleeper (2012)	No End (2013)

Keith Jarrett European Quartet chronology
Personal Mountains (1987)	Sleeper (2012)

Sleeper is a double album by Keith Jarrett's "European Quartet" recorded on April 16, 1979 in Tokyo, and released on ECM 33 years later in 2012.

== April 1979 Tour in Japan ==
Sleeper was recorded in Japan during a tour in which, according to www.keithjarrett.org, Jarrett's "European Quartet" performed 13 times in 20 days. Below is the list of the dates and venues:

- 2 – Kosei Nenkin Hall, Tokyo
- 4 – Civic Hall, Fukuoka
- 5 – Yubin-Chokin Hall, Hiroshima
- 6 – Kosei Nenkin Hall, Osaka
- 9 – International House, Kobe
- 10 – Kaikan Hall 1, Kyoto
- 12 – Aichi Auditorium, Nagoya
- 13 – Kosei Nenkin Hall, Tokyo
- 16 – Nakano Sun Plaza, Tokyo
- 17 – Nakano Sun Plaza, Tokyo
- 18 – Hokkaido Kosei Nenkin Hall, Sapporo
- 20 – Kanagawa Kenmin Hall, Yokohama
- 21 – Prefectural Culture Center, Ibaraki

Some of the music played in Tokyo (different dates other than April 16) is collected in the album Personal Mountains

== Reception ==
Professional ratings
Review scores
Source	Rating
All About Jazz	5/5 stars
The Guardian	5/5 stars

In a review for AllMusic, Christian Genzel wrote: "As a companion piece to the live albums Nude Ants and Personal Mountains..., Sleeper offers another noteworthy document of the creative interplay between these four musicians." John Kelman, writing for All About Jazz, called the quartet a "very special and unforgettable group", and commented: "If Sleeper accomplishes any single thing, beyond being a stellar performance from a group that has rightfully, in the ensuing years, become legendary— and remains a touchstone for many musicians, young and old, decades after the fact— it's that this two-disc, 107-minute recording is a reminder of just how compelling a composer Jarrett can be.

Writing for The Guardian, John Fordham called the album "enthralling", and stated: "'Personal Mountains' is a 20-minute tour de force of shifting harmonies and chord-punching Latin grooving. 'Innocence' drifts in freefall until it becomes a softly swaying love song. 'So Tender' has the shape of a standard ballad... but then loosens. 'Oasis' sounds like an Ornette Coleman lament, and 'New Dance' is probably as close as any of these performers came to playing a mainstream jazz-calypso like Sonny Rollins' famous version of 'Don't Stop the Carnival'. There's lots of free-improv, too, but the range of this remarkable group played a big part in its enduring influence on contemporary jazz."

In an article for Between Sound and Space, Tyran Grillo wrote: "If ever it were possible for a recording to be even more alive than the day it was laid down, this is it—such is the value of its release. In addition to the symbiotic rhythm section, Garbarek naysayers may find themselves knocked on their rears by the exuberant, life-affirming themes issuing from his bell, each fitting snugly in Jarrett's pianistic relief. A classic before it ever hit the shelves, Sleeper may just be the ECM event of the year and is, as its title implies, a dream to hear at long last."

== Track listing ==
All compositions by Keith Jarrett

CD 1

1. "Personal Mountains" – 21:12
2. "Innocence" – 10:47
3. "So Tender" – 13:27

CD 2

1. "Oasis" – 28:13
2. "Chant of the Soil" – 14:52
3. "Prism" – 11:15
4. "New Dance" – 7:07

== Personnel ==
- Keith Jarrett – piano, percussion
- Jan Garbarek – tenor and soprano saxophones, flute, percussion
- Palle Danielsson – double bass
- Jon Christensen – drums, percussion

Production

- Manfred Eicher – producer
- Jan Erik Kongshaug – recording engineer
- Terje Mosnes – photos
- Sascha Kleis – design
- Toshinari Koinuma – concert production
