= At the Deer Head Inn =

Live album by Keith Jarrett
- Released: April 1994
- Recorded: 16 September 1992
- Venues: Deer Head Inn; Delaware Water Gap, PA
- Genre: Jazz
- Length: 66:27
- Labels: ECM; ECM 1531
- Producer: Bill Goodwin

Keith Jarrett chronology
Bridge of Light (1994)	At the Deer Head Inn (1994)	Standards in Norway (1995)

At the Deer Head Inn is a live album by American jazz pianist Keith Jarrett recorded at the Deer Head Inn jazz club on September 16, 1992 and released by ECM in April 1994. The trio features rhythm section Gary Peacock and Paul Motian. The remaining songs from the concert were released in November 2024 as The Old Country: More from Deer Head Inn.. Next year appeared At the Deer Head Inn - The Complete Recordings, containing the 15 tracks from the two albums, released as a 4LPs-set (ECM 2829/30).

== Background ==
The album was recorded at a venue where Jarrett performed very early in his career, and was the first to feature Motian since the 1976 session that yielded Byablue and Bop-Be, the final recordings of Jarrett's American Quartet, collected on the 1992 compilation Silence.

== Reception ==
Professional ratings
Review scores
Source	Rating
AllMusic	4/5 stars
The Penguin Guide to Jazz	3.5/4 stars

The AllMusic review by Scott Yanow awarded the album 4 stars and states: "The inventive interpretations give listeners plenty of surprises and variety, making this a very enjoyable outing".

The authors of The Penguin Guide to Jazz wrote: "Motian brings a lighter and more flowing pulse to the music than DeJohnette... 'Bye Bye Blackbird'... glides along without wires or other obvious support for more than ten minutes, a beautiful airborne performance... As so often, Peacock is more forceful and less complex out of the studio... It seems unlikely that Jarrett will ever need to go back to bar-room gigs, but here he's demonstrated his ability to work a small audience with powerful, unpretentious jazz."

== Track listing ==
1. "Solar" (Miles Davis) – 11:21
2. "Basin Street Blues" (Spencer Williams) – 9:09
3. "Chandra" (Jaki Byard) – 9:21
4. "You Don't Know What Love Is" (Gene de Paul, Don Raye) – 12:55
5. "You and the Night and the Music" (Howard Dietz, Arthur Schwartz) – 5:41
6. "Bye Bye Blackbird" (Mort Dixon, Ray Henderson) – 10:13
7. "It's Easy to Remember" (Lorenz Hart, Richard Rodgers) – 7:47

== Personnel ==
- Keith Jarrett – piano
- Gary Peacock – double bass
- Paul Motian – drums

=== Technical personnel ===
- Bill Goodwin – producer
- Kent Heckman – recording engineer
- Barbara Wojirsch – cover design
- David W. Coulter – photography

== Charts ==
=== Weekly charts ===
2025 weekly chart performance for At the Deer Head Inn
Chart (2025)	Peak position
Croatian International Albums (HDU)	9
German Albums (Offizielle Top 100)	20

=== Monthly charts ===
2025 monthly chart performance for At the Deer Head Inn
Chart (2025)	Peak position
German Jazz Albums (Offizielle Top 100)	1
