= Personal Mountains =

Live album by Keith Jarrett
- Released: May 1989
- Recorded: April 1979
- Venue: Tokyo, Japan
- Genre: Jazz
- Length: 61:22
- Label: ECM; ECM 1382
- Producer: Manfred Eicher

Keith Jarrett chronology
Dark Intervals (1988)	Personal Mountains (1989)	Changeless (1989)

Keith Jarrett European Quartet chronology
Nude Ants (1980)	Personal Mountains (1989)	Sleeper (2012)

Personal Mountains is a live album by American jazz pianist Keith Jarrett recorded in Tokyo during his April 1979 tour in Japan, and released by ECM ten years later, in 1989. The quartet—Jarrett's "European Quartet"—features saxophonist Jan Garbarek and rhythm section Palle Danielsson and Jon Christensen.

== April 1979 Tour in Japan ==
Personal Mountains contains tracks from different concerts performed in Tokyo during Jarrett's tour with his "European Quartet" in April 1979. The tour also produced Sleeper (1989).

- 2 – Kosei Nenkin Hall, Tokyo
- 4 – Civic Hall, Fukuoka
- 5 – Yubin-Chokin Hall, Hiroshima
- 6 – Kosei Nenkin Hall, Osaka
- 9 – International House, Kobe
- 10 – Kaikan Hall 1, Kyoto
- 12 – Aichi Auditorium, Nagoya
- 13 – Kosei Nenkin Hall, Tokyo
- 16 – Nakano Sun Plaza, Tokyo – Sleeper (1989)
- 17 – Nakano Sun Plaza, Tokyo
- 18 – Hokkaido Kosei Nenkin Hall, Sapporo
- 20 – Kanagawa Kenmin Hall, Yokohama
- 21 – Prefectural Culture Center, Ibaraki

== Reception ==
Professional ratings
Review scores
Source	Rating
AllMusic	4/5 stars
The Penguin Guide to Jazz	3/4 stars
Tom Hull	B+

The AllMusic review by Richard S. Ginell awarded the album 4 stars, stating, "Clearly this is one of the peaks of the European quartet's discography."

== Track listing ==
All compositions by Keith Jarrett.

1. "Personal Mountains" – 16:02
2. "Prism" – 11:15
3. "Oasis" – 18:03
4. "Innocence" – 7:16
5. "Late Night Willie" – 8:46

== Personnel ==
=== European Quartet ===
- Keith Jarrett – piano, percussion
- Jan Garbarek – tenor and soprano saxophones
- Palle Danielsson – double-bass
- Jon Christensen – drums

=== Technical personnel ===
- Manfred Eicher – producer
- Jan Erik Kongshaug – recording engineer
- Barbara Wojirsch – layout
- Rose Anne Colavito – drawing
