= Rio (Keith Jarrett album) =

Live album by Keith Jarrett
- Released: November 2011
- Recorded: April 9, 2011
- Venues: Teatro Municipal; Rio de Janeiro, Brazil
- Genre: Jazz
- Length: 90:25
- Labels: ECM; ECM 2198/99
- Producer: Manfred Eicher

Keith Jarrett chronology
Jasmine (2010)	Rio (2011)	Sleeper (2012)

Keith Jarrett solo piano chronology
Paris / London: Testament (2009)	Rio (2011)	Creation (2015)

Rio is a live double-album of solo piano improvisations by Keith Jarrett, recorded at the Teatro Municipal in Rio de Janeiro on April 9, 2011, and released on ECM in November that same year.

== Reception ==
Professional ratings
Aggregate scores
Source	Rating
Metacritic	90/100
Review scores
Source	Rating
Allmusic	4.5/5 stars
The Australian	4.5/5 stars
The Daily Telegraph	3/5 stars
The Guardian	5/5 stars
The Independent	4/5 stars
Jazzwise	5/5 stars
Popmatters	9/10 stars

The Allmusic review by Thom Jurek awarded the album 4½ stars, stating, "After one listen, it becomes obvious Rio is indeed very special. It puts on aural display Jarrett as a virtually boundless musician, whose on-the-spot, wide-ranging ideas are executed with astonishing immediacy and dexterity; this music is passionate, poetic (often songlike), and stands outside the confines of genre... since nothing approaching what is here actually exists in Jarrett's recorded catalog. Rio is therefore the new standard by which the pianist's future solo recordings will be judged, and perhaps also sets the bar for any other player who attempts the same."

The Guardian's John Fordham said, "Rio represents Jarrett at his most exuberant."

Writing for PopMatters, Will Layman noted, "Rio is the most brilliant Jarrett solo recording in recent memory. Rather than improvising in a longer, more rambling form, Jarrett works here in shorter statements, each focused and concise. In 15 very different miniatures, Rio demonstrates the pianist's astonishing facility for generating not only grooves or settings but also developing webs of melody and counter-melody. From free playing to blues to gospel to aching ballads, Jarrett covers a vast landscape of piano."

The Independent's Andy Gill said, "these 15 pieces sketch an entire world of music, coloured by the locale, and shifting between the smoothly lyrical and the propulsively rhythmic, with Jarrett's familiar, pulsing left-hand figures providing a stolid foundation anchoring the serpentine runs of his right hand."

The Independent on Sunday's Phil Johnson compared it to Jarrett's most successful release, stating, "The second of the two discs is a lyrical triumph to equal the Koln Concert, intense drama and emotional catharsis captured through long-haul, improvised performance."

The Daily Telegraph's Ivan Hewett was less enthusiastic, observing, "There are good things here, but nothing especially new."

== Track listing ==
Disc #1

1. Part I - 8:40
2. Part II - 6:52
3. Part III - 6:00
4. Part IV - 4:13
5. Part V - 6:25
6. Part VI - 7:00

Disc #2

1. Part VII - 7:28
2. Part VIII - 4:58
3. Part IX - 5:02
4. Part X - 5:01
5. Part XI - 3:20
6. Part XII - 6:09
7. Part XIII - 7:03
8. Part XIV - 5:40
9. Part XV - 6:34

Music by Keith Jarrett

== Personnel ==
- Keith Jarrett – piano

production

- Keith Jarrett – producer
- Manfred Eicher - executive producer
- Martin Pearson - engineer (recording)
- Mayo Bucher - cover
- Daniela Yohaness - photography
- Sascha Kleis - layout
