= Standards, Vol. 1 =

Studio album by Keith Jarrett
- Released: 1983
- Recorded: January 11–12, 1983
- Studios: Power Station, New York City
- Genre: Jazz
- Length: 45:33
- Label: ECM 1255
- Producer: Manfred Eicher

Keith Jarrett chronology
Concerts (1982)	Standards, Vol. 1 (1983)	Changes (1984)

Jarrett / Peacock / DeJohnette chronology
Standards, Vol. 1 (1983)	Changes (1984)

Standards, Vol. 1 is an album by American jazz pianist Keith Jarrett recorded over two days in January 1983 and released on ECM on cassette and LP later that year—a session which also produced Changes (1984) and Standards, Vol. 2 (1985). The trio features rhythm section Gary Peacock and Jack DeJohnette, the first release by the long-standing "Standards Trio".

In 2008 the two Standards albums and Changes were collected into a boxed set, Setting Standards: New York Sessions.

== Background ==
Keith Jarrett, Gary Peacock and Jack DeJohnette had originally worked together on a 1977 album headlined by Peacock, Tales of Another, coming back together in 1983 when producer Manfred Eicher proposed a trio album to Jarrett. Jarrett approached Peacock and DeJohnette with the idea of performing standards, which was greatly contrary to the contemporary jazz scene of the early 1980s. In a 2008 interview with the San Francisco Chronicle, Jarrett recalled his reasons for wanting to record standards. "This material was so damn good," he said, "and why was everyone ignoring it and playing clever stuff that sounds all the same?" He told Salon in 2000 that "[a] valuable player doesn't have to play anything new to have value, because it's not about the material, it's about the playing."

The three joined in a studio in Manhattan, New York City for a 2 1/2 day session during which they recorded enough material for three albums, the two Standards volumes and Changes. For that session, as in subsequent, the trio did not rehearse or pre-plan their playlist.

DeJohnette, also speaking to the San Francisco Chronicle, recalled that the trio had agreed to "do this until we don't feel like doing this anymore." In 2008, the trio celebrated its 25th anniversary, becoming during that time "the preeminent jazz group interpreting standards."

== Reception ==
Professional ratings
Review scores
Source	Rating
AllMusic	4/5 stars
The Penguin Guide to Jazz	3.5/4 stars
Rolling Stone	2/5 stars

Standards, Vol. 1 reached No. 14 on the Billboard Jazz Albums charts.

In his review in Rolling Stone Steve Futterman describes the album as "merely...competent", criticizing Jarrett's "deficiencies as a jazz improviser":

Jarrett's technical skills may be unquestionable, but on this record, the singsong monochromaticism and skim-the-surface profundity of his style are all too apparent. Jarrett never digs into a tune; he glides over it. The only way you can tell he is heating up is when his grunts get louder. Yet this is the very pianistic method that has made Jarrett a star – his solos are so pleasingly pretty and unobtrusive that you don't really have to listen to them.

Jazz musician and writer Ian Carr noted in his biography of Jarrett that with these volumes the trio had found "fresh ways of approaching the classic jazz repertoire."

In its review of the box set, PopMatters noted that the material "sounded dazzling in the mid-1980s", adding that "[f]ans of Jarrett, like myself, will always hear these records as having a fresh immediacy."

== Track listing ==
1. "Meaning of the Blues" (Bobby Troup, Leah Worth) – 9:26
2. "All the Things You Are" (Oscar Hammerstein II, Jerome Kern) – 7:47
3. "It Never Entered My Mind" (Lorenz Hart, Richard Rodgers) – 6:48
4. "The Masquerade Is Over" (Herb Magidson, Allie Wrubel) – 6:01
5. "God Bless the Child" (Arthur Herzog Jr., Billie Holiday) – 15:32

== Personnel ==
=== Standards Trio ===
- Keith Jarrett – piano
- Gary Peacock – double bass
- Jack DeJohnette – drums

=== Production ===
- Manfred Eicher – producer
- Jan Erik Kongshaug – engineer (recording)
- Barbara Wojirsch – cover design
