= Treasure Island (Keith Jarrett album) =

Studio album by Keith Jarrett
- Released: 1974
- Recorded: February 27–28, 1974
- Studio: Generation Sound Studios, New York City (USA)
- Genre: Jazz
- Length: 44:14
- Label: Impulse! [AS-9274]
- Producer: Ed Michel

Keith Jarrett chronology
In the Light (1974)	Treasure Island (1974)	Belonging (1974)

Keith Jarrett American Quartet chronology
Fort Yawuh (1973)	Treasure Island (1974)	El Juicio (The Judgement) (1975)

Professional ratings
Review scores
Source	Rating
AllMusic	4.5/5 stars
Christgau's Record Guide	B
Encyclopedia of Popular Music	3/5 stars
The Rolling Stone Jazz Record Guide	2/5 stars
Record Collector	4/5 stars

Treasure Island is an album recorded in February 1974 by Keith Jarrett and originally released by Impulse! in 1974. It features Jarrett's later-to-be-called "American Quartet" (Dewey Redman, Charlie Haden, Paul Motian) plus guitarist Sam Brown, and percussionists Guilherme Franco and Danny Johnson. Two months after recording Treasure Island, in April 1974, Jarrett would enter a studio in Norway to record Belonging with a group of Scandinavian players, later called Jarrett's "European group".

In 2009, the album was reissued in a digipak case by Verve Music Group/Universal Music Group.

== Original notes ==
'Treasure Island'
The treasure has always been there
It is not hidden
But is only where certain people would look
At all
Thus it remains a secret to the rest
And to solace themselves
They say it's hidden
Or buried
To still their invading thoughts
---
Some are calm and content
Or at peace, in their words
Some are stirred and cloudy
But they are improving their vision
---
Of the island
Of themselves

== Reception ==
In his AllMusic review, Thom Jurek awarded the album 4.5 stars and said: "This is a terrific sendoff to a very fertile, creative period and raises the question as to what else may have happened had this band been able to explore their unique, fully communal sound together for more than a pair of albums."

Writing for Record Collector, Charles Waring said the album "represents Jarrett's most easily digestible offering for Impulse! Highlights include the soulful, country-blues of "The Rich (And the Poor)", and the glistening, mellifluous title track.

== Track listing ==
"The Rich (and the Poor)"
The Rich (and the Poor) sample

All compositions by Keith Jarrett except as indicated

1. "The Rich (And the Poor)" – 9:24
2. "Blue Streak" – 2:35
3. "Fullsuvollivus (Fools of All of Us)" – 6:29
4. "Treasure Island" – 4:14
5. "Introduction/Yaqui Indian Folk Song" (Jarrett/traditional) – 2:16
6. "Le Mistral" – 9:25
7. "Angles (Without Edges)" – 5:24
8. "Sister Fortune" – 4:27

== Personnel ==
=== Musicians ===
- Keith Jarrett – piano, soprano saxophone (7) and OSI drum
- Dewey Redman – tenor saxophone, tambourine (tracks 1, 2, 3, 5, 6, 7)
- Sam Brown – guitar (tracks 4, 8)
- Charlie Haden – bass
- Paul Motian – drums, percussion
- Guilherme Franco – percussion
- Daniel LaRue Johnson – percussion

=== Production ===
- Ed Michel – producer
- Tony May – engineer
- Rick Heenan – mix engineer (at The Village Recorder, Los Angeles)
- Roberto Masotti – photography

=== Verve 2009 reissue ===
- Harry Weinger – reissue supervision
- Kevin Reeves – mastering (at Universal Mastering Studios-East)
- Hollis King – art direction
- Isabelle Wong/isthetic – design
- Kyle Benson – A&R co-ordination
- Andy Kamn – production coordination
