= Arbour Zena =

Studio album by Keith Jarrett
- Released: May 1976
- Recorded: October 1975
- Studios: Tonstudio Bauer, Ludwigsburg, West Germany
- Genres: Jazz; contemporary classical music
- Length: 53:01
- Label: ECM
- Producer: Manfred Eicher

Keith Jarrett chronology
The Köln Concert (1975)	Arbour Zena (1976)	Mysteries (1976)

Keith Jarrett orchestral works chronology
Luminessence (1975)	Arbour Zena (1976)	The Celestial Hawk (1980)

Arbour Zena is an orchestral work composed by American jazz pianist Keith Jarrett which was recorded in October 1975 and released by ECM the following year. The trio features saxophonist Jan Garbarek and bassist Charlie Haden backed by members of the Stuttgart Radio Symphony Orchestra conducted by Mladen Guteša.

== Reception ==
Professional ratings
Review scores
Source	Rating
AllMusic	3/5 stars
Encyclopedia of Popular Music	3/5 stars
The Penguin Guide to Jazz	2.5/4 stars
The Rolling Stone Jazz Record Guide	3/5 stars
Tom Hull	B−

Reviewing the album for AllMusic, Richard S. Ginell awarded the album 3 stars and said, "although this music can be attractive in small doses, the lack of tempo or texture contrasts over long stretches of time—particularly the nearly 28-minute "Mirrors"—can be annoying if you're not in the right blissful mood."

Reviewing the album for the website All About Jazz, John Kelman said:

Jarrett had already released music more aligned with the classical sphere on 1974's In the Light, which contained works for string quartet and brass quintet, a fughata for harpsichord and more; but it was with Arbour Zena—reuniting the pianist with the string section Stuttgart's Südfunk Symphony Orchestra and conductor Mladen Gutesha (who'd performed In the Light's "Metamorphosis")—that Jarrett found the magic nexus between composition and improvisation, both through his own contributions on piano and with the participation of Haden and saxophonist Jan Garbarek, also making the record an even broader marriage of his European and American concerns.

== Track listing ==
All tracks are written by Keith Jarrett.

Side A
No.	Title	Dedicated to	Length
1.	"Runes"	The unknown	15:26
2.	"Solara March"	Pablo Casals and the sun	9:44

Side B
No.	Title	Dedicated to	Length
1.	"Mirrors"	Jarrett's teachers	27:50
Total length:			53:01

== Personnel ==
- Keith Jarrett – piano
- Jan Garbarek – tenor and soprano saxophones
- Charlie Haden – upright bass
- Members of the Stuttgart Radio Symphony Orchestra, conducted by Mladen Guteša – strings

=== Technical personnel ===
- Martin Wieland – recording engineer
- Manfred Eicher – producer
- Rolf Liese – cover graphic
- Dieter Bonhorst – layout
