= Back Hand =

Studio album by Keith Jarrett
- Released: 1975
- Recorded: October 9–10, 1974
- Studios: Generation Sound Studios, New York City
- Genre: Jazz
- Length: 39:29
- Label: Impulse!
- Producer: Ed Michel

Keith Jarrett chronology
El Juicio (The Judgement) (1975)	Back Hand (1975)	Death and the Flower (1975)

Keith Jarrett American Quartet chronology
El Juicio (The Judgement) (1975)	Back Hand (1975)	Death and the Flower (1975)

Back Hand is an album by American jazz pianist Keith Jarrett recorded in two sessions in October 1974 that also gave way to the album Death and the Flower. Originally released in 1975 by Impulse!, it features performances by Jarrett's American Quartet, which included Dewey Redman, Charlie Haden and Paul Motian along with Guilherme Franco added on percussion. For a long time, the album remained a relatively obscure work until it was resuscitated by Impulse! years later.

Aside from its appearance in The Impulse Years: 1973-1974 boxset in 1997, the music contained in Back Hand had been reissued only on compact disc in Japan, packaged in a miniature replica of the original vinyl LP sleeve. It also appeared in Italy, in 2001, as a supplement to the La Repubblica national newspaper, copyrighted as "Musicom S.R.L."

Pianist Bruce Hornsby recorded the tune "Back Hand" for the 2000 album As Long as You're Living Yours: The Music of Keith Jarrett, where it is listed as "Backhand". The track later appeared on the 2006 Hornsby compilation Intersections (1985–2005).

A short version of "Vapallia" appeared on Jarrett's solo album Facing You, recorded in 1971.

== Reception ==
Professional ratings
Review scores
Source	Rating
Allmusic	4.5/5 stars
The Rolling Stone Jazz Record Guide	3/5 stars
Record Collector	3/5 stars

An AllMusic review by Scott Yanow awarded the album 4.5 stars stating "The group (with Jarrett occasionally switching to flute and Redman to the bizarre-sounding musette) is in typically exploratory, yet often melodic form on lengthy renditions of four of Jarrett's inside/outside originals.". In a separate AllMusic review, Michael G. Nastos awarded Back Hand 5 stars, referring to the group as a "landmark quintet", and writing: "any recording by this band is worthwhile".

Pianist / composer Ethan Iverson singled out the track "Vapallia" for praise, calling it a "beautiful space ballad", and writing: "The emotion of the composition borders on the saccharine, but Redman's sonority and simple horn fills work as a salty agent, balancing out the elements, creating something mysterious." Iverson called "Back Hand" "an amusingly square stomp, quite strange in affect... for grunting quartet" and noted "this might be the first time the band is actually playing Jazz with a capital J... there is amazing potential here, the band is just starting this era of swing."

Phil Freeman, writing for Burning Ambulance, commented that "Inflight" reminded him of the Ornette Coleman albums Science Fiction and Broken Shadows, largely because of the presence of Redman and Haden, who played on both recordings, and whose performances Freeman called "bluesy and hard-swinging, but also seeming to hover in place rather than charge forward." Freeman also praised Jarrett's solo on "Back Hand", stating that it is "like a waterfall landing on highly polished glass, sending bright outbursts of light shimmering in all directions."

== Track listing ==
All compositions by Keith Jarrett

1. "Inflight" - 9:04
2. "Kuum" - 11:34
3. "Vapallia" - 7:46
4. "Back Hand" - 11:05

The Italian edition also featured a fifth track: "Victoria" - 5:04 (composed by Jarrett and Paul Motian)

== Personnel ==
- Keith Jarrett - piano, flute, percussion
- Dewey Redman - tenor saxophone, musette, percussion
- Charlie Haden - bass
- Paul Motian - drums, percussion
- Guilherme Franco - percussion

Production

- Ed Michel - producer
- Tony May - engineer
- Baker Bigsby - engineer (mixing)
- Rom Wilkes - art direction
- Tim Bryant - design
