= Expectations (Keith Jarrett album) =

Studio album by Keith Jarrett
- Released: October 1972
- Recorded: April 5–6 & 27, 1972
- Studio: Columbia Studio E, New York City, US
- Genre: Avant-garde jazz, post-bop, jazz fusion
- Length: 78:02
- Label: Columbia
- Producer: George Avakian, Bob Belden

Keith Jarrett chronology
Birth (1972)	Expectations (1972)	Ruta and Daitya (1973)

Keith Jarrett American group chronology
Birth (1972)	Expectations (1972)	El Juicio (1975)

Expectations is a double album recorded by Keith Jarrett in 1972 and released on Columbia Records the same year. In addition to Jarrett, musicians on the recording include his "American quartet": Dewey Redman on tenor saxophone, Charlie Haden on bass, and Paul Motian on drums. Also featured are Sam Brown on electric guitar, Airto on percussion, as well as brass and string sections whose members are not credited in the album information. Expectations was produced by George Avakian, Jarrett's manager since 1966.

In January 1999 Jarrett wrote that "Expectations is a very special recording for me, and the only release that ties so many of the feelings I had about music together in such a rich, varied and coherent weave."

The album was awarded the Grand Prix du Disque in 1972.

== Background: Jarrett and Columbia ==
In late summer 1971, while Jarrett was still a member of the Miles Davis band, he was dropped by Atlantic Records due to a declining market for jazz, and also because Atlantic producer Nesuhi Ertegun disliked Jarrett's album Restoration Ruin. Avakian approached Columbia, with whom Davis had a contract, and proposed a double album. Jarrett was given a contract, and in April 1972 went into the studio to record Expectations. However, a few weeks after the album's release, Columbia suddenly dropped Jarrett in favor of Herbie Hancock. Jarrett was stunned, stating that he did not receive any communication from Columbia, and thus did not know he had been dropped. The label's actions later became known as "The Great Columbia Jazz Purge" (or "Bad Day at Black Rock"), during which Jarrett, Ornette Coleman, Bill Evans and Charles Mingus were all given contracts by Columbia only to be let go shortly afterwards (on the same day, according to some involved), as the company moved increasingly toward jazz fusion. (One writer commented that Columbia's decision was "rather like the 1961 New York Yankees suddenly placing Roger Maris, Yogi Berra, Whitey Ford, and Mickey Mantle on waivers.") Accordingly, Expectations remains Jarrett's only Columbia album under his own name.

The 1999 CD reissue (Columbia Legacy) original notes contain "A little essay on Expectactions" by Keith Jarrett. There he explains that:

I had collected (over a period of time) material for what I guess I thought of as my "big" project: the inclusion of most of my expressive interests. I actually had the whole idea pretty well figured out when I talked to Columbia, but it didn't really matter because not only did they not care what I was going to do, they didn't really know what I did! I had a preliminary meeting with a guy at Columbia who actually asked me, "So ... what do you do?" So I told him I played the piano. Surprisingly, that seemed to answer his question. This actually was perfect for me since it meant that nobody would be snooping around the studio reporting the strange music they had heard to someone above. (However, they then "dropped" me only two weeks after the release of Expectations, thus breaking their own contract.)

== Jarrett notes on Columbia CD reissue ==
Better than anyone else regarding his own critique, in 1999, on occasion of the Columbia Legacy CD reissue, Jarrett unfolds a few details about the production of Expectations:

With "Expectations" I wanted a seamless, seemingly boundary-less expression of a broad range of emotions. I wanted colors to shift tonally and timbrely, and I wanted the content of each song to determine the direction of the playing. I talked a lot to the players about the kinds of feelings we were invoking in each piece.
(..)
I think of this album as a single thing, not just a bunch of tunes. The line from "Vision" to "There is a Road" is a coherent, intentional path; and the statement is the thing in its entirety. The order is the only order that tells the story. Once before, in the early '90's, Columbia re-released this music on CD, but, to my horror, they shuffled the order and ruined what the whole thing was about. This time I got involved early, and I appreciate its re-emergence in its correct form.

I could say a few things about specific tunes, but I believe the sonic message is much purer. I will explain, however, that "The Circular Letter (for J.K.)" was for Joseph Knecht in Hermann Hesse's The Glass Bead Game and "Roussillion" (sic) is a town in the south of France (Provence) [actually Roussillon] with incredible red clay cliffs.

== Reception ==
Professional ratings
Review scores
Source	Rating
Allmusic	4/5 stars
Encyclopedia of Popular Music	3/5 stars
The Penguin Guide to Jazz	4/4 stars
The Rolling Stone Jazz Record Guide	3/5 stars
Downbeat	4.5/5 stars

In a review for AllMusic, Richard S. Ginell wrote: "This was the first real indication to the world that Keith Jarrett was an ambitious, multi-talented threat to be reckoned with, an explosion of polystylistic music that sprawled over two LPs (now squeezed onto a single CD)... Jarrett again turns his early rampant eclecticism loose -- from earthy gospel-tinged soul-jazz to the freewheeling atonal avant-garde -- yet this time he does it with an exuberance and expansiveness that puts his previous solo work in the shade." The authors of the Penguin Guide to Jazz Recordings commented: "there are few better places to sample Jarrett's uncanny ability to make disparate musical ideas work together... the logic of the session is impeccable."

Pianist Ethan Iverson praised the track titled "Roussillon", writing "Jarrett plays the head on soprano, but then takes a burning solo on piano. Redman enters with his trademark screaming through the horn while playing. This is great music." Regarding "Bring Back the Time When (If)," he wrote: "A good theme, a space between a normal piano tune and the Ornette thing. The scalding tenor solo is Redman at his most Albert Ayler-esque. Nice misterioso ending with unexpected soft final piano chord. The band is coming together." Iverson also singled out "There is a Road (God's River)", commenting: "The pianist begins with a rich rumination that evolves into a full gospel cry; nobody else can play like this. The contrasting theme, full orchestra chords behind Brown's rock guitar, is distinctive and powerful... It might be Jarrett’s most impressive piece for piano plus orchestra."

Jarrett biographer Ian Carr wrote that, on Expectations, there is "a deepening maturity in Jarrett's whole conception. In short, when he is not trying to sound like Ornette Coleman he is beginning to sound very much like himself. Also the emotional areas he projects are broadening and deepening. His fecund imagination produces endlessly interesting melodies and powerful rhythms. And his playing reaches new heights of expression... This is a glimpse of the scope of Jarrett's vision and its all-embracing concept of music." Carr called the concluding track a "truly amazing performance", and commented: "here at last it seems that Keith Jarrett has achieved a new unity between the diverse strands of his music. This piece has the power of a religious anthem."

John Ephland gave the album 4.5 stars in his Downbeat review of the CD reissue. He wrote, "Jarrett's lasting musical eclecticism-thanks, in large part, to a recent stint in Miles’ band—comes shining through in a set of 11 originals that, oddly enough, do not include one number that 'swings.' Ornette’s influence is keenly felt throughout . . . Brothers in arms Haden, Motian, Redman, the late, underrated Sam Brown, and Airto all evoke images and memories of a time when collaborations could produce just about anything".

== Track listing ==
All compositions by Keith Jarrett

1. "Vision" – 0:51
2. "Common Mama" – 8:14
3. "The Magician in You" – 6:55
4. "Roussillion" – 5:25
5. "Expectations" – 4:29
6. "Take Me Back" – 9:33
7. "The Circular Letter (for J.K.)" – 5:04
8. "Nomads" – 17:23
9. "Sundance" – 4:31
10. "Bring Back the Time When (If)" – 9:53
11. "There Is a Road (God's River)" – 5:32

== Personnel ==
- Keith Jarrett - piano, organ, soprano saxophone, tambourine, percussion, arrangements
- Dewey Redman - tenor saxophone, percussion
- Charlie Haden - bass
- Paul Motian - drums
- Sam Brown - guitar
- Airto Moreira - percussion
- Unidentified string section
- Unidentified brass

(Moreira and Motian both play drums on "The Circular Letter" and "Sundance")
