= Vera Brandes =

German record producer (born 1956)

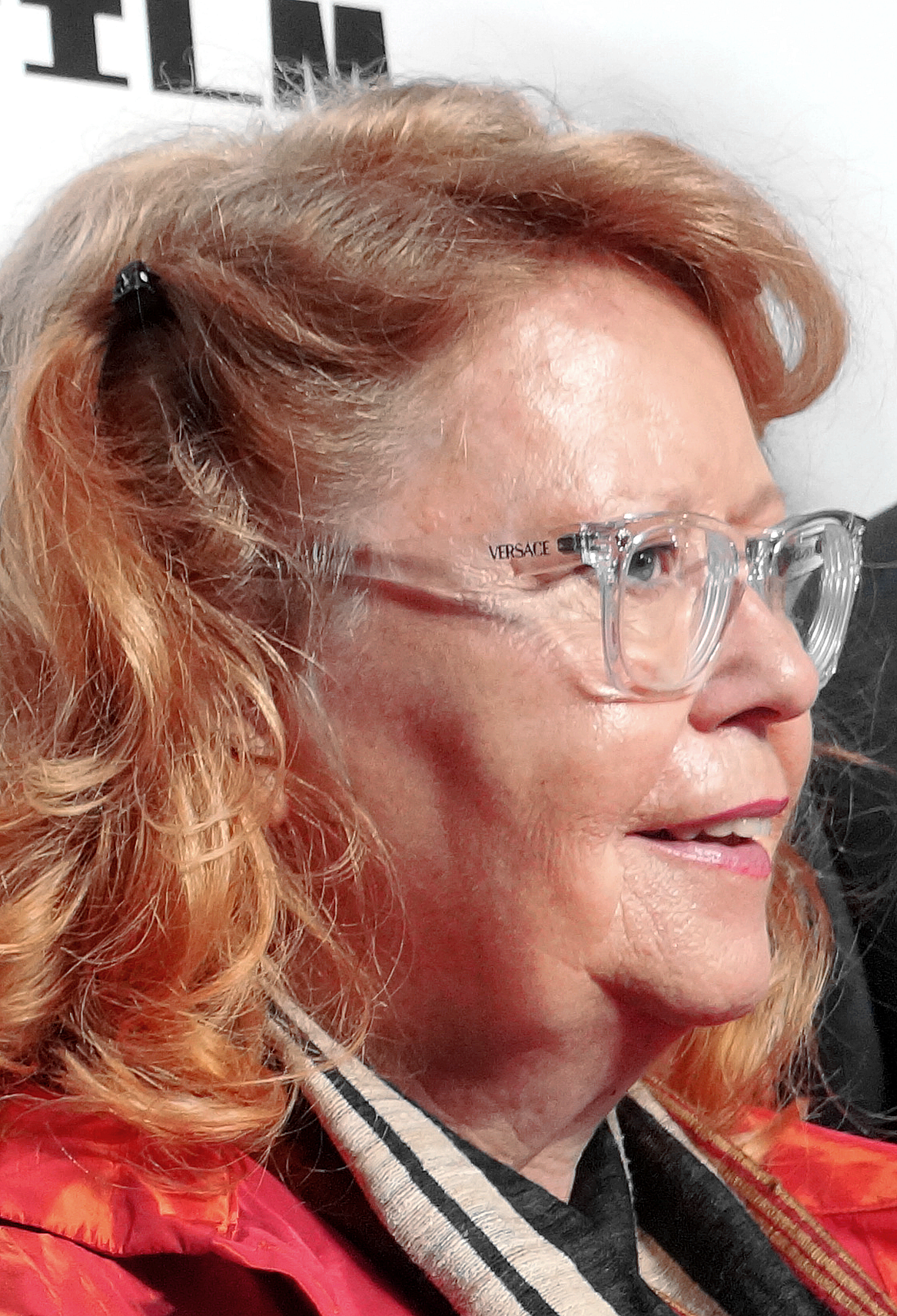
Vera Brandes, 2025

Vera Brandes (born 1956 in Cologne) is a German music producer and researcher in music and media effects. The feature film Köln 75 tells the story of how as a teenager she produced the famous concert by pianist Keith Jarrett at the Opera House in Cologne, which became the best-selling recording of a solo jazz piano performance.

== Life and impact ==
Brandes began to organize jazz concerts and tours at the age of fifteen, one of the first being a tour with Ronnie Scott's trio. In 1974 she organized the New Jazz in Cologne concert series in Cologne. The fifth concert in the series was the legendary "Köln Concert" by Keith Jarrett on 24 January 1975, which the pianist wanted to cancel because of an inadequate grand piano, back problems and fatigue. The concert took place only at the persistent urging of Brandes.

Brandes' first record label CMP – founded in 1977 with the concert promoter Kurt Renker – released albums by Nucleus, Charlie Mariano, Jeremy Steig and Theo Jörgensmann. In 1980 she founded the VeraBra label, where she worked as the sole producer and publisher. In 1984 she founded the label Intuition Records.

Brandes produced and published more than 350 albums, including works by Reinhard Flatischler, The Lounge Lizards, Mikis Theodorakis, Barbara Thompson, Hermeto Pascoal and Andreas Vollenweider.

Following a car accident, she began studying the medical effects of music in 1995. From 2004 to 2017, she led a third-party funded research program for music medicine at the Paracelsus Medical University in Salzburg and conducted, among other things, a study on the effect of music on depression.

== Book publications ==
- Salvesen, Christian; Brandes, Vera (2006). Leben im Rhythmus. Die heilende Kraft der Klänge, Schwingungen und Gefühle (in German). München: O. W. Barth. ISBN 3-502-61152-1.
- Haas, Roland; Brandes, Vera (2009). Music That Works – Contributions of biology, neurophysiology, psychology, sociology, medicine and musicology. Wien: Springer. ISBN 978-3-211-75121-3.
