= Ruta and Daitya =

Studio album by Keith Jarrett & Jack DeJohnette
- Released: 1973
- Recorded: May 1971
- Studio: Sunset Studios, Los Angeles, CA
- Genre: Jazz
- Length: 41:20
- Label: ECM 1021 ST
- Producer: Manfred Eicher

Keith Jarrett chronology
Expectations (1972)	Ruta and Daitya (1973)	Fort Yawuh (1973)

Jack DeJohnette chronology
Take Off Your Body (1972)	Ruta and Daitya (1973)	Life Is Round (1973)

Alternate cover

Ruta and Daitya is jazz album by pianist Keith Jarrett and drummer Jack DeJohnette, recorded in May 1971 and released on ECM Records in 1973—one of Jarrett's rare performances on electric keyboard.

== Production ==
In his biography Keith Jarrett: The Man and His Music, Ian Carr explains how the album came to be recorded: "Early in 1971, when the Miles Davis group was doing a few days at Shelly's Manne Hole in Los Angeles, a friend from the Sunset Studios there offered Jarrett and DeJohnette some free studio time to record as a duo. They took drums and percussion and the electric piano and organ from the club and made a tape." Jarrett gave Manfred Eicher the tapes after the Facing You session—on November 10, 1971—to be mixed and produced.

== Reception ==
The AllMusic review by Richard S. Ginell stated that "this is a valuable, underrated transition album that provides perhaps the last glimpse of the electric Keith Jarrett as he embarked on his notorious (and ultimately triumphant) anti-electric crusade."

Professional ratings
Review scores
Source	Rating
AllMusic	3/5 stars
The Encyclopedia of Popular Music	3/5 stars
Tom Hull	B+
The Penguin Guide to Jazz	3/4 stars
The Rolling Stone Jazz Record Guide	4/5 stars

== Track listing ==
All compositions by Keith Jarrett and Jack DeJohnette except as indicated

1. "Overture/Communion" – 6:00
2. "Ruta and Daitya" – 11:14
3. "All We Got" – 2:00
4. "Sounds of Peru/Submergence/Awakening" – 6:31
5. "Algeria" – 5:47
6. "You Know, You Know" (Jarrett) – 7:44
7. "Pastel Morning" (Jarrett) – 2:04

== Personnel ==
=== Musicians ===
- Keith Jarrett – piano, electric piano, organ, flute
- Jack DeJohnette – drums, percussion

=== Technical personnel ===
- Manfred Eicher – producer
- Kurt Rapp – mixing
- Martin Wieland – mixing engineer
- Barbara Wojirsch – cover design and layout
