= Death and the Flower =

Studio album by Keith Jarrett
- Released: 1975
- Recorded: October 9–10, 1974
- Studios: Generation Sound Studios, New York City, (USA)
- Genre: Jazz
- Length: 41:46
- Labels: Impulse! [AS 9301]
- Producer: Ed Michel

Keith Jarrett chronology
| Back Hand (1975) | Death and the Flower (1975) | The Köln Concert (1975) |

Keith Jarrett American Quartet chronology
| Back Hand (1975) | Death and the Flower (1975) | Mysteries (1976) |

Death and the Flower is an album recorded by Keith Jarrett in October 1974 during two sessions that also produced Back Hand. Released in 1975, the disc features the pianist's "American Quartet" (Dewey Redman, Charlie Haden, Paul Motian) with percussionist Guilherme Franco.

== Reception ==
Professional ratings
Review scores
| Source | Rating |
|---|---|
| Allmusic | 3/5 stars |
| Encyclopedia of Popular Music | 3/5 stars |
| The Rolling Stone Jazz Record Guide | 4/5 stars |
| The Village Voice | B |

The Allmusic review by Scott Yanow awarded the album 3 stars stating, "The main selection, the 21-minute "Death and the Flower," develops logically from atmospheric sounds to intense group improvising and back again; it is the main reason to acquire this [recording].".

Writing for the now defunct jazz magazine Jazz.com, in 2008 Ted Gioia gave the title track "Death and the Flower" a 97/100 rating and praised it:

Keith Jarrett delighted in subverting the familiar conventions of the piano-led jazz band with his early 1970s combo work. He relied on Redman and Haden, fire tested in the school of Ornette, who didn't really need chords from the keyboard to guide their musical journeys. And sometimes Jarrett would step away from the piano himself. The instrument does not even appear until some six minutes into this track. Instead we have a delicate web of percussion underpinning wood flute, and eventually Haden's bass enters throbbing like a slow heartbeat. But Jarrett's solo, when it arrives, is worth the wait. His touch and melodic inventiveness are shown off to good effect. Tone control, always one of his strengths, is especially evident here, with Motian and Haden giving him space and dynamic room to make best use of his ethereal pianissimo. Redman imposes a more macho attitude when his tenor enters the fray, and one can hear the whole group adjusting. In fact, the give-and-take throughout this entire performance is noteworthy. Jarrett doesn't so much lead this band as immerse himself into its suchness. Yet his composition serves as the fluid structure that makes it all possible. This extended work (some 22 minutes) is essential listening for anyone who wants to come to grips with the artistry of pre-Standards Jarrett.

Pianist Bruce Hornsby recorded "Death and the Flower" with bassist Christian McBride and drummer Jack DeJohnette on Camp Meeting (Legacy Recordings, 2007).

Bassist Eric Revis, who has played with Betty Carter, Branford Marsalis, Orrin Evans, Steve Coleman, J. D. Allen and Avishai Cohen, recorded "Prayer" with pianist Kris Davis and drummer Andrew Cyrille on City of Asylum (Clean Feed, 2013).

== Track listing ==
All compositions by Keith Jarrett

1. "Death and the Flower" - 22:49
2. "Prayer" - 10:12
3. "Great Bird" - 8:45

== Original notes ==
On the album's inner sleeves Keith Jarrett signed this poem dated on December 5, 1974:

Death And The Flower
We live between birth and death
Or so we convince ourselves conveniently
When in truth we are being born and
We are dying simultaneously
Every eternal instant
Of our lives

We should try to be more
Like a flower
Which every day experiences its birth
And death
And who therefore is much more prepared
To live
The life of a flower

So think of Death as a friend and advisor
Who allows us to be born
And to bloom more radiantly
Because of our limits
On Earth

Think of this until you realise
Eternity
And cease to need
The illusion of Death

But do not do this
Before you lose the first great illusion:
The Illusion of Life

Because
To do this
You must die Many times
And live to
Know it

== Personnel ==
- Keith Jarrett - piano, wooden flute, soprano saxophone
- Dewey Redman - tenor saxophone, musette, percussion
- Charlie Haden - bass
- Paul Motian - drums, percussion
- Guilherme Franco - percussion
