= Luminessence =

Studio album by Keith Jarrett
- Released: March 1975
- Recorded: April 29–30, 1974
- Studio: Tonstudio Bauer; Ludwigsburg, W. Germany
- Genre: Contemporary classical music
- Length: 35:44
- Label: ECM 1049 ST
- Producer: Manfred Eicher

Keith Jarrett chronology
| Belonging (1974) | Luminessence (1975) | El Juicio (The Judgement) (1975) |

Keith Jarrett orchestral works chronology
| In the Light (1974) | Luminessence (1975) | Arbour Zena (1976) |

Luminessence: Music for String Orchestra and Saxophone is an album composed by American pianist Keith Jarrett featuring saxophonist Jan Garbarek and the Südfunk-Sinfonieorchester conducted by Mladen Gutesha, recorded in April 1974 and released on ECM the following year—Jarrett does not perform on this album. The title is a portmanteau of "luminescence" and "essence".

== Background ==
Gutesha had conducted the Stuttgart strings on "Metamorphosis," from Jarrett's 1974 album In the Light, and would appear as conductor on Arbour Zena (1976).

== Recording, production ==
While the music for string orchestra was notated, the saxophone part was improvised. Producer Manfred Eicher recalled: "Luminessence shows Keith's affinity for Jan Garbarek's playing. He studied Jan's music and the scales he used, and he also got the concept of the harmonic structures – the framework of the piece – with Jan in mind... Jan was indeed honoured that Keith wanted to write this for him."

Similarly, Jarrett biographers Ian Carr and Wolfgang Sandner both praised Jarrett's ability to compose a score suited to Garbarek's style and abilities. Carr wrote: "the few melodies Jarrett writes sound like Garbarek improvisations, so great is the rapport between the two men," while Sandner commented that Jarrett "knew which kind of musical background was needed to ignite Jan Garbarek's melancholic saxophone into excursions through the jazz cosmos."

== Reception ==
Professional ratings
Review scores
| Source | Rating |
|---|---|
| AllMusic | 4/5 stars |
| Encyclopedia of Popular Music | 3/5 stars |
| The Penguin Guide to Jazz | 2.5/4 stars |
| The Rolling Stone Jazz Record Guide | 3/5 stars |

The AllMusic review by Richard S. Ginell awarded the album 4 stars and states, "The concept is not unlike that of Stan Getz's Focus, but this music is far more static, downcast, and free of the pulse of jazz. As was characteristic of his writing then, Jarrett's string parts are mostly turgid and thick-set, indulging in weird, sliding microtones on "Windsong", weighted down by some kind of emotional burden. Particularly when delivering piercing sustained notes on soprano, Garbarek often sounds like a native of the Middle East."

Writing for the New York Times, Stephen Davis stated that Luminessence "recalls both Gabriel Faure and Pierre Dubois," and, pairing it with In the Light, commented: "These albums belong neither to jazz or 'modern' music and they do not make easy listening. Both titles imply that Jarrett 'sees' his music as a colorful physical energy as did Scriabin almost a century ago."

== Track listing ==
All compositions by Keith Jarrett

1. "Numinor" – 13:49
2. "Windsong" – 6:32
3. "Luminessence" – 15:23

== Personnel ==
=== Musicians ===
- Jan Garbarek – tenor and soprano saxophones
- Mladen Gutesha – conductor
  - Südfunk-Sinfonieorchester

=== Technical personnel ===
- Manfred Eicher – producer
- Kurt Rapp, Martin Wieland – recording engineers
- Barbara and Burkhart Wojirsch, Sascha Kleis – cover design
- Terje Mosnes, Kira Tolkmitt – photography
