= Fort Yawuh =

Live album by Keith Jarrett
- Released: 1973
- Recorded: February 24, 1973
- Venue: Village Vanguard, New York City (USA)
- Genre: Jazz
- Length: 41:40
- Label: Impulse!
- Producer: Ed Michel

Keith Jarrett chronology
Ruta and Daitya (1973)	Fort Yawuh (1973)	Solo Concerts: Bremen/Lausanne (1973)

Keith Jarrett American group chronology
The Mourning of a Star (1971)	Fort Yawuh (1973)	Treasure Island (1974)

Retrospective professional reviews
Review scores
Source	Rating
AllMusic	4/5 stars
Christgau's Record Guide	A−
Encyclopedia of Popular Music	2/5 stars
The Rolling Stone Jazz Record Guide	4/5 stars
The Penguin Guide to Jazz Recordings	3/4 stars

Fort Yawuh is a jazz album by American pianist and composer Keith Jarrett. Originally released in 1973 by Impulse! Records, it marks the beginning of the label’s relationship with Jarrett. Recorded live at the Village Vanguard on February 24, 1973 by Jarrett's "American Quartet": Dewey Redman on tenor saxophone, Charlie Haden on acoustic bass, Paul Motian on drums, plus percussionist Danny Johnson. The title of the album is an anagram of "Fourth Way," a reference to George Gurdjieff's fourth path of self-awareness.

== Background ==
At the time the recording was made, Daniel LaRue Johnson had never worked as a professional musician. In an interview led by Ethan Iverson, bassist Charlie Haden said that Johnson was "a great, great painter, and a great friend, and someone who was at EVERY gig, and one day he suddenly asked to sit in with us at the Village Vanguard. Keith asked, “What do you play?” “Triangle!” said Johnson. Keith said yes and Danny came down with a big oriental rug and sat like a sitar player with his triangle. And that was the night we recorded Fort Yawuh." One year later, Johnson joined the group again on percussion (along with Guilherme Franco) - this time for the studio recording of Treasure Island.

== Critical reception ==
Reviewing for Creem in 1974, Robert Christgau said that, while side one sounds like cluttered free jazz at first, it is in fact highlighted by the Ornette Coleman-like playing of saxophonist Dewey Redman. He found side two more accessible because of drummer Paul Motian's performance during "De Drums" and the attractive composition of "Still Life Still Life".

In a retrospective review, Allmusic's Qa'id Jacobs wrote, "Fans of Jarrett's avant-garde liberalism will find 'De Drums' to be the track most unlike the other four selections on this album. 'Still Life, Still Life' is more like a ballad in that it's very slow, but it still maintains the structural freedom featured in the 'Fort Yawuh,' '(If the) Misfits (Wear It),' and 'Roads Traveled, Roads Veiled.'"

Writing for the former jazz magazine Jazz.com, in June 2008 Ted Gioia rated 90/100 the track (If The) Misfits (Wear It) stating that:

"Here is a glimpse of Keith Jarrett the avant-garde experimentalist, the combo leader who built a band around former Ornette Coleman sidemen, the artist who constantly staked out new territory with every LP. No standards here, I'm afraid. Jarrett was a different cat completely back during the Nixon administration. He plays with ferocious pianism in the opening moments of this track. Instead of the typical comping chords and jazzy right-hand phrases that most keyboardists bring to work every day, Jarrett dishes out flurries of notes, a biting sandstorm of sound. Then midway through the performance, he stops playing the piano completely, and we might as well be back in Ornette's band. "Chord changes? We don't need no stinkin' chord changes!" Later, when Jarrett starts playing soprano, matching up with Redman in the front line, who can be surprised? Fans of this band were so used to the unexpected that nothing could shake them by this point."

== Track listing ==
All compositions by Keith Jarrett

Side One

No.	Title	Length
1.	"(If the) Misfits (Wear It)"	10:10
2.	"Fort Yawuh"	10:55
Total length:		21:05

Side Two

No.	Title	Length
1.	"De Drums"	11:57
2.	"Still Life, Still Life"	8:38
Total length:		20:35

=== Extended Release ===
The CD box set The Impulse Years: 1973-1974 expands Fort Yawuh to two CDs, including unedited versions of the takes chosen for the LP as well as additional tracks.

Disc One

No.	Title	Length
1.	"(If the) Misfits (Wear It)" (includes material not included in originally released version)	12:58
2.	"Fort Yawuh" (includes material not included in originally released version)	17:41
3.	"De Drums"	11:53
4.	"Still Life, Still Life"	8:37
5.	"(If The) Misfits (Wear It)" (previously unreleased)	13:24
Total length:		64:33

Disc Two

No.	Title	Length
1.	"Whistle Tune" (previously unreleased)	2:29
2.	"Spoken Introduction" (previously unreleased)	2:12
3.	"Angles (Without Edges)" (previously unreleased)	14:17
4.	"Roads Traveled, Roads Veiled" (previously unreleased in this length; a shortened version of 9:30 has appeared in other reissues by Impulse!)	20:25
5.	"De Drums (excerpt)"	7:27
6.	"Melting The Ice" (previously unreleased)	18:03
Total length:		64:53

== Personnel ==
- Keith Jarrett - piano, soprano saxophone, tambourine
- Dewey Redman - tenor saxophone, clarinet, musette, maracas
- Charlie Haden - bass
- Paul Motian - drums, percussion
- Danny Johnson - percussion
