= Köln 75 =

2025 German music drama film

- Promotional poster
- Directed by: Ido Fluk
- Written by: Ido Fluk
- Produced by: Sol Bondy; Fred Burle
- Starring: Mala Emde; John Magaro; Michael Chernus; Alexander Scheer
- Cinematography: Jens Harant
- Edited by: Anja Siemens
- Music by: Stefan Rusconi; Hubert Walkowski
- Production companies: One Two Films; Extreme Emotions; Gretchenfilm; MMC Studios Köln GmbH
- Distributed by: Alamode Film distribution; Polyfilm
- Release dates: February 16, 2025 (Berlinale); March 13, 2025 (Germany)
- Running time: 117 minutes
- Countries: Germany; Poland; Belgium
- Languages: German; English
- Box office: $300,004

Köln 75 is a 2025 German music-drama film directed by Ido Fluk. The film follows the true story of Vera Brandes, teenage patron of the 1970s Cologne (German: Köln) music scene, as she makes plans to organize a Keith Jarrett concert in Cologne, which eventually became his album The Köln Concert. Mala Emde and John Magaro star as Brandes and Jarrett, respectively.

The film, released on the 50th anniversary of the concert, was selected in the Berlinale Special Gala section at the 75th Berlin International Film Festival, and had its world premiere at the festival on 16 February 2025. Its theatrical release was on March 13, 2025, in German theaters.

== Synopsis ==
The film follows 18-year-old Vera Brandes as she defies her conservative parents to organize a 1975 concert by Keith Jarrett in Cologne. Despite near failure, the impromptu performance's recording becomes the iconic Köln Concert, a landmark of 20th-century music.

== Cast ==
- Mala Emde as Vera Brandes, German concert organizer
  - Susanne Wolff as 50-year-old Vera Brandes
- John Magaro as Keith Jarrett, American jazz pianist
- Michael Chernus as Michael "Mick" Watts, American journalist for Melody Maker
- Alexander Scheer as Manfred Eicher, German record producer and founder of ECM Records
- Ulrich Tukur as Dr. Brandes, Vera's father
- Jördis Triebel as Ilse Brandes, Vera's mother
- Corey Johnson as Lawrence 'Gus' Mailer

== Production ==
Principal photography began on 5 October 2023 on locations in Germany and Poland. Filming ended on 3 November 2023 in North Rhine-Westphalia.

== Release ==
Köln 75 was released on 13 March 2025 theatrically in Germany by Alamode Filmdistribution, and in Switzerland by Polyfilm. On 24 March 2025, it was screened in Kaleidoscope section of the Sofia International Film Festival.

It was also showcased at the 53rd Norwegian International Film Festival in Main Programme section on 16 August 2025. It was also a part of the films 'Based on A True Story' at the 2025 Atlantic International Film Festival and screened on September 13, 2025. The film was also showcased in 'World Cinema' section at the 2025 Cinéfest Sudbury International Film Festival on 20 September 2025. On 11 October 2025, it was presented in Galas and special presentations section of 2025 Vancouver International Film Festival as closing film of the festival.

It was later released in more European regions, and is planned to be released theatrically in the United States by Zeitgeist Films.
