= The Mourning of a Star =

Studio album by Keith Jarrett
- Released: 1971
- Recorded: July 8–9, 16 and August 23, 1971
- Studio: Atlantic, New York City, US
- Genre: Jazz
- Length: 43:51
- Label: Atlantic [SD 1596]
- Producer: George Avakian

Keith Jarrett chronology
| Gary Burton & Keith Jarrett (1971) | The Mourning of a Star (1971) | Facing You (1972) |

Keith Jarrett American Group chronology
| Somewhere Before (1968) | The Mourning of a Star (1971) | Fort Yawuh (1973) |

The Mourning of a Star is an album by Keith Jarrett recorded in 1971 with his regular working trio (bass player Charlie Haden and drummer Paul Motian) and released that same year by Atlantic Records. On five dates in July and August 1971 Jarrett went into the studio with Haden and Motian and, along with Dewey Redman on tenor saxophone, produced enough material for three albums, The Mourning of a Star, El Juicio (The Judgement) (released in 1975) and Birth (released in 1972). Although Dewey Redman does not appear on this album, the July and August 1971 sessions marked the metamorphosis of Jarrett's first trio into what would be his future quartet.

The album mostly contains tunes conceptualized in the "traditional" avantgarde piano trio approach heard in Life Between the Exit Signs (recorded in 1967) but also expands to a much richer and colourful soundscape where Jarrett can be heard on different instruments, paving the way to what was to come later with the addition of Dewey Redman on reeds.

== Jarrett on soprano saxophone ==
Even though Jarrett had already been recording on soprano saxophone since at least 1967 while with Charles Lloyd (Journey Within: Charles Lloyd Quartet at the Fillmore Auditorium), it had not been until Restoration Ruin (1968) that he featured that instrument on one of his own albums. His formal presentation as an accomplished soprano saxophone soloist can be heard on "Traces of You" and snippets of his flute playing also appear here and there throughout the album.

== Critical reception ==
Professional ratings
Review scores
| Source | Rating |
|---|---|
| AllMusic | 3/5 stars |
| DownBeat | 4/5 stars |
| Encyclopedia of Popular Music | 3/5 stars |
| The Penguin Guide to Jazz | 3/4 stars |
| The Rolling Stone Jazz Record Guide | 2/5 stars |

The AllMusic review by Scott Yanow awarded the album 3 stars, stating "These trio performances (with bassist Charlie Haden and drummer Paul Motian) are impressive for the period, but the best was yet to come.".

Writing in 2011 for JazzTimes à propos of Jarrett's The Mourning of a Star, Kenny Werner highlights two of its tunes stating that:

"The album is an early indication that Jarrett would create the juxtaposition of the most melodic and harmonically pleasing music and the most adventurous free improvisations, often in the same tune!"

"[In "Standing Outside"], although he wrote this song, Jarrett displays the same lyricism and harmony as [Joni] Mitchell. He goes through many delightfully improbable transpositions and still manages to make it seem like a country folksong."

"["All I Want"] ... is a Joni Mitchell tune. What's notable is how similar her harmonic and melodic sense was to one corner of Jarrett's world. Jarrett's music comprised so many facets, and among them were the sensibilities of a folk musician. Generally speaking, when a jazz musician approaches pure chords (as can be found in folk music), the re-harmonization can diminish the resonance of the original song. Not so with Keith Jarrett."

== Track listing ==
All compositions by Keith Jarrett except as indicated

1. "Follow the Crooked Path (Though It Be Longer)" - 6:15
2. "Interlude No. 3" - 1:15
3. "Standing Outside" - 3:22
4. "Everything That Lives Laments" - 2:16
5. "Interlude No. 1" - 1:40
6. "Trust" - 6:56
7. "All I Want" (Joni Mitchell) - 2:22
8. "Traces of You" - 5:08
9. "The Mourning of a Star" - 9:24
10. "Interlude No. 2" - 0:55
11. "Sympathy" - 4:32

== Personnel ==
- Keith Jarrett - piano, soprano saxophone, recorder, steel & conga drums
- Charlie Haden - acoustic bass, steel drums
- Paul Motian - drums & percussion
