= Ed Michel =

- Born: 1936 (age 89–90); Los Angeles, California, United States
- Occupations: Record producer, music company executive, manager

Ed Michel is a record company executive, record producer and musician. He has produced albums in the jazz genre as well as other genres.

== Background ==
Artists he has worked with as a producer include, Louis Armstrong, John Coltrane, Albert Ayler, Pharoah Sanders, Keith Jarrett, McCoy Tyner, Chet Baker, Duke Ellington, and The Chambers Brothers.

He was a longtime producer for Alice Coltrane.

== Career ==
=== 1950s ===
Michel produced the album, A Night at the Ash Grove (An Evening of Coffee-House Music), that featured Bud Dashiell and Travis Edmonson, Barbara Dane, Rolf Cahn, and Lynn Gold which was released on World Pacific Records WP-1254 in 1958.

=== 1960s ===
Michel produced the People Get Ready album for The Chambers Brothers. His friend, Jack Lewerke ran Vault Records. Lewerke needed to make a Chambers Brothers album. Michel said he would organize it and got hold of Wally Heider. They had issues during the recording of the group. The album notes by Elliot Tiegel say that the album was recorded at the Ash Grove in Los Angeles and the Unicorn in Boston. Michel recalled that it was all done at the Ash Gove. He also didn't think that Brian Keenan was the drummer. He thought it was a young rock'n'roll drummer who grew up in Laurel Canyon. A 2017 email from Thurman Watts, the co-writer of Lester Chambers' biography said that Lester Chambers claimed the drummer was Jesse (Nicky) Cahn, the son of Barbara Dane and folk musician Rolf Cahn. The Chambers Brothers had an early drummer called Mike Konnic who is credited on the album. Apparently he had an argument with the Chambers Brothers. The album received a positive review in the 23 April 1966 issue of Cash Box with the songs "Call Me" and "Hooka Tooka" being singled out.

In late 1966, he was working for the Muntz company as associate director of the company's Music Department.

=== 1970s to 2000s ===
Michel had worked with Sun Ra. He set up a meeting between Sun Ra, Sun Ra, Alton Abraham who was Ra's manager and ABC, the parent company of the Impulse! label. The result was a licensing agreement for past and future recordings on the El Saturn label to be distributed via Impulse! and ABC. This happened in 1972. Michel and Abraham produced the Astro Black album which was released in 1973.

Michel produced the recordings for Robb Kunkel's Abyss album. The sessions took place at The Village Recorder in Los Angeles, in April, June and October 1972. The album was released on Tumbleweed Records Inc. in 1973. Michel also produced John Lee Hooker's Free Beer and Chicken album. It was recorded on 14 May 1974 and released later that year.

Michel produced Keith Jarrett's Back Hand album which was released in 1975. It was reviewed in the 1 November issue of Cash Box. It received a positive review with the tracks, "Backhand", "Vapallia", and "Kuum" being singled out for mention.

Michel produced the Quiet Fire album for Roy Haynes which was recorded in July 1977.

He produced Art Pepper's Today album which was released in 1979.
