= The Celestial Hawk =

Studio album by Keith Jarrett
- Released: November 1980
- Recorded: March 22, 1980
- Venue: Carnegie Hall; New York City
- Genre: Contemporary classical music
- Length: 39:57
- Label: ECM 1175
- Producer: Keith Jarrett and Manfred Eicher

Keith Jarrett chronology
G.I. Gurdjieff: Sacred Hymns (1980)	The Celestial Hawk (1980)	Invocations/The Moth and the Flame (1981)

Keith Jarrett orchestral works chronology
Arbour Zena (1976)	The Celestial Hawk (1980)	Ritual (1982)

The Celestial Hawk: For Orchestra, Percussion and Piano is an album of contemporary classical music by Keith Jarrett recorded at Carnegie Hall with the Syracuse Symphony Orchestra, conducted by Christopher Keene, on March 22, 1980 and released on ECM November that same year.

== Background ==
The Celestial Hawk came about when, in 1976, Jarrett received a commission from Deutsche Grammophon to compose a piece for the Boston Symphony Orchestra, to be conducted by Seiji Ozawa, and featuring piano, with Jarrett as the soloist. The result was a 200-page 40-minute fully-composed piece with minimal improvisation, completed in 1978. (The title refers to a bird depicted in Tibetan mythology, of which one wing represents compassion and the other represents wisdom.) Unfortunately, the BSO were expecting a jazz-based work, with Jarrett improvising at the piano, and lost interest in the piece.

Later, Jarrett recalled: "I had stumbled into what I would call the marketing world of classical music, without realizing it. I'm glad that they never did it. They thought it was going to be a big kick for the orchestra sales and they would have this jazz piece with me as soloist. And then they discovered this isn't jazz at all – it doesn't even swing, and it's different from what we expected, and it won't sell, and so... sorry!... It's pathetic, but it's normal practice." However, Jarrett and Manfred Eicher then decided to record the music for ECM, financing the project themselves. The recording took place at Carnegie Hall with the Syracuse Symphony, conducted by Christopher Keene, on March 22, 1980. Eicher reflected: "I had to work with a team I'd never met before... We did the recording in a few hours, despite the underground trains roaring by all the time – we had to stop and start and stop and start. And the union rate!... it was an incredibly expensive project for ECM, but it worked... The records didn't sell very well... but so what!"

== Reception ==
Professional ratings
Review scores
Source	Rating
AllMusic	3/5 stars
The Penguin Guide to Jazz	1.5/4 stars
The Rolling Stone Jazz Record Guide	3/5 stars

The AllMusic review awarded the album 3 stars.

In an article for Between Sound and Space, Tyran Grillo wrote: "Despite being very programmatic, this music is far more than incidental to the narrative it describes. At times tumbling in billowy romance, at others even jarringly uncomfortable, Jarrett's piano embraces itself, following the orchestral advice that surrounds it to the letter. It is an honest music, a painful truth, a call for peace in a violent world."

Jarrett biographer Ian Carr commented: "considering it is his first major orchestral piece, the writing is astonishingly assured, there is a discernible inner logic, and a fluidity in some of the scoring so fine that it seems to have the spontaneity of improvisation. There are strong non-Western elements, ostinato patterns and percussive figures... which recall gamelan music, but Jarrett seems to write equally well for all sections of the orchestra..." Carr also noted that a number of critics "were puzzled as to whether the piece was a piano concerto or a symphony, and found themselves unable to classify it... The work, like Jarrett himself, requires a completely fresh response – something which is rarely found among professional critics anywhere".

== Track listing ==
All compositions by Keith Jarrett

1. "First Movement" – 18:15
2. "Second Movement" – 7:06
3. "Third Movement" – 14:33

== Personnel ==
- Keith Jarrett – piano
- Christopher Keene – conductor
  - Syracuse Symphony Orchestra

=== Production ===
- Keith Jarrett – producer
- Manfred Eicher – producer
- Stan Tonkel – recording engineer
- Martin Wieland – mixing engineer
- Robert Hurwitz, Brian Carr – production coordination
- Barbara Worjirsch – design
