= Birth (album) =

Studio album by Keith Jarrett
- Released: 1972
- Recorded: July 15–16, 1971
- Studio: Atlantic, New York City, US
- Genre: Jazz
- Length: 39:25
- Label: Atlantic
- Producer: George Avakian

Keith Jarrett chronology
Facing You (1972)	Birth (1972)	Expectations (1972)

Keith Jarrett American Quartet chronology
The Mourning of a Star (1971)	Birth (1972)	Expectations (1972)

Professional ratings
Review scores
Source	Rating
Allmusic	3/5 stars
The Penguin Guide to Jazz	3/4 stars
The Rolling Stone Jazz Record Guide	3/5 stars

Birth is an album by Keith Jarrett recorded in 1971 and released the next year. On five dates in July and August 1971 Jarrett went into the studio with his trio (Charlie Haden and Paul Motian) augmented with Dewey Redman on tenor saxophone and produced enough material for three albums, The Mourning of a Star (released in 1971), El Juicio (The Judgement) (released in 1975) and Birth. These albums marked the emergence of what would later be called Jarrett's "American quartet."

== Reception ==
The Allmusic review by Scott Yanow awarded the album 3 stars, stating, "Not everything works, and there are some wandering moments, but the music always holds one's interest; one can easily see the potential that would soon be realized by this intriguing ensemble.".

== Track listing ==
All compositions by Keith Jarrett

1. "Birth" – 6:13
2. "Mortgage on My Soul" – 5:38
3. "Spirit" – 8:38
4. "Markings" – 0:37
5. "Forget Your Memories (And They'll Remember You)" – 6:57
6. "Remorse" – 11:22

== Personnel ==
- Keith Jarrett – piano, soprano saxophone, recorder, banjo, steel drums, vocals
- Dewey Redman – tenor saxophone, Chinese musette, bells, clarinet, percussion, vocals
- Charlie Haden – double-bass, congas, steel drums, clapper
- Paul Motian – drums, steel drums, bells, percussion
