= Radiance (Keith Jarrett album) =

Live album by Keith Jarrett
- Released: May 2005
- Recorded: October 27 and 30, 2002
- Venue: Festival Hall, Osaka (Japan); Tokyo Bunka Kaikan (Main Hall), Tokyo (Japan)
- Length: 2:19:36
- Label: ECM; ECM 1960/61

Keith Jarrett chronology
The Out-of-Towners (2004)	Radiance (2005)	The Carnegie Hall Concert (2006)

Keith Jarrett solo piano chronology
The Melody at Night, with You (1999)	Radiance (2005)	The Carnegie Hall Concert (2006)

Radiance is a double-album by American pianist Keith Jarrett recorded in October 2002 in Japan at two different concerts—Osaka (October 27) and Tokyo (October 30)—and released by ECM in May 2005. In April 2006, a video recording of the live performance at Tokyo was released as Tokyo Solo.

After dismissing the idea of performing lengthy improvised solos (see A Multitude of Angels), Radiance marked a new beginning in Jarrett's approach to solo piano concerts and this would be assessed in future solo recordings. According to keithjarrett.org, the documented 2002 Osaka and Tokyo concerts were only his third and fourth solo performances since temporarily retiring due to chronic fatigue syndrome; the other two had taken place in Tokyo in September 1999.

== Background ==
In the original liner notes, "Some Words about the Music," Keith Jarrett states:

The first 13 tracks are discrete pieces drawn from each previous piece, and constitute the entire concert in Osaka. The second piece would not have existed without the first, etc. The audience in Japan also was not prepared for this format, so you will notice no applause at times. Not so strangely, this gave me a chance to really know what to play next. It was a gift to have no applause. Not so much of a gift was the coughing, but still, after experimenting with taking some of the coughs out of the mix, I opted for everything to be there. The event lays itself out as it happened. I was slightly shocked to notice that the concert had arranged itself into a musical structure despite my every effort to be oblivious to the overall outcome. I should not have felt this way, however, for the subconscious musical choices of sequence were made out of the personal need for the next thing. This is what one should keep in mind while listening. We are all players and we are all being played.

== Reception ==
Professional ratings
Review scores
Source	Rating
AllMusic	4.5/5 stars
The Penguin Guide to Jazz	4/4 stars

The AllMusic review by Thom Jurek awarded the album 4.5 stars, stating, "His process is immediate, poignant, and utterly engaging throughout and marks a new phase in his solo recordings that will spur great interest in any open-minded listener interested in improvisational music."

The authors of The Penguin Guide to Jazz awarded the album 4 stars, and wrote: "this superb Osaka set is one of the highlights of his career. Having looked again at free playing alongside his standards repertoire, Jarrett had the confidence to sit down at the piano... and simply let the music flow through him... these two discs create a strong impression of two performances that develop out of tiny germs of ideas... It's what Jarrett does with them that is remarkable... A riveting and arresting record."

== Track listing ==
All music by Keith Jarrett

Disc one
(Osaka: October 27)

1. "Radiance, Part 1" – 12:18
2. "Radiance, Part 2" – 8:53
3. "Radiance, Part 3" – 5:58
4. "Radiance, Part 4" – 1:33
5. "Radiance, Part 5" – 10:58
6. "Radiance, Part 6" – 8:00
7. "Radiance, Part 7" – 9:51
8. "Radiance, Part 8" – 5:25
9. "Radiance, Part 9" – 6:11

Disc two
(Osaka: October 27)

1. "Radiance, Part 10" – 13:55
2. "Radiance, Part 11" – 1:40
3. "Radiance, Part 12" – 7:06
4. "Radiance, Part 13" – 5:58

(Tokyo: October 30)

5. "Radiance, Part 14" – 14:04
6. "Radiance, Part 15" – 10:03
7. "Radiance, Part 16" – 3:23
8. "Radiance, Part 17" – 14:12

== Personnel ==
- Keith Jarrett – piano

Production

- Martin Pearson – engineer
- Yoshihiro Suzuki – assistant engineer
- Sascha Kleis – design
- Peter Neusser – photography (cover)
- Junichi Hirayama – photography (liner)
- Keith Jarrett – liner notes
