= The Carnegie Hall Concert (Keith Jarrett album) =

Live album by Keith Jarrett
- Released: September 2006
- Recorded: September 26, 2005
- Venue: Isaac Stern Auditorium; Carnegie Hall; New York City
- Genre: Jazz
- Length: 1:50:23
- Label: ECM; ECM 1989/90
- Producer: Manfred Eicher

Keith Jarrett chronology
Radiance (2005)	The Carnegie Hall Concert (2006)	My Foolish Heart (2007)

Keith Jarrett solo piano chronology
Radiance (2005)	The Carnegie Hall Concert (2006)	Paris / London: Testament (2009)

The Carnegie Hall Concert is a solo live double-album by the American pianist Keith Jarrett recorded at the Isaac Stern Auditorium of Carnegie Hall on September 26, 2005 and released on ECM September the following year.

== Reception ==
The AllMusic review by Thom Jurek awarded the album 4 stars stating, "This is a Jarrett solo set for the ages; it showcases, since his full return in 1997 (sic), his renewed and restless commitment to the music and to himself as an artist."

Professional ratings
Review scores
Source	Rating
Allmusic	4/5 stars
The Penguin Guide to Jazz	4/4 stars

== Applause ==
The Carnegie Hall Concert contains applause, audience noise and Jarrett's interactions with fans totalling approximately 20 minutes of extra-musical time between tracks.

"As on many of Jarrett's live discs, producer Manfred Eicher allows the audience's long and thunderous period of applause to overwhelm the end of many tracks" says reviewer Will Layman at PopMatters and "folks tend to be divided about whether this is indulgence (Jarrett's, the arrogant artist) or psychology (Eicher's manipulation—you are there) or simply padding out the CD's length."

Reviewer John Kelman at All About Jazz notes that "Curious, however, is the applause between tracks—in some cases nearly three minutes long, adding up to nearly nineteen minutes in total. Exciting as it may have been to be there, the lengthy audience noise does nothing but defeat the recorded program's continuity."

Thomas Conrad at JazzTimes has his word stating that "This is a valuable addition to a distinguished body of recorded work. One complaint: With its five encores, the second CD contains more than 17 minutes of applause and 59 minutes of music. This ratio will test the patience of even the most worshipful Jarrett fans in search of a vicarious solo concert experience."

== Track listing ==
All compositions by Keith Jarrett except as indicated.

Disc one

1. "Part I" - 9:56
2. "Part II" - 3:32
3. "Part III" - 4:44
4. "Part IV" - 5:19
5. "Part V" - 9:54

Disc two

1. "Part VI" - 6:50
2. "Part VII" - 8:35
3. "Part VIII" - 5:19
4. "Part IX" - 8:25
5. "Part X" - 9:46
6. Encore: "The Good America" - 6:47
7. Encore: "Paint My Heart Red" - 8:30
8. Encore: "My Song" - 8:04
9. Encore: "True Blues" - 7:00
10. Encore: "Time on My Hands" (Adamson, Gordon, Youmans) - 7:30

== Personnel ==
- Keith Jarrett – piano

Production

- Keith Jarrett – recording producer
- Manfred Eicher - executive producer
- Martin Pearson - engineer (recording)
- Sascha Kleis - design
- Richard Termine - photography (concert)
