= Solo Concerts: Bremen/Lausanne =

Live album by Keith Jarrett
- Released: November 1973
- Recorded: March 20 and July 12, 1973
- Venues: Salle de Spectacles d'Epalinges (Lausanne, Switzerland); Kleiner Sendesaal (Bremen, Germany)
- Length: 128:13
- Label: ECM 1035–37 ST
- Producer: Manfred Eicher

Keith Jarrett chronology
Fort Yawuh (1973)	Solo Concerts: Bremen/Lausanne (1973)	In the Light (1974)

Keith Jarrett solo piano chronology
Facing You (1972)	Solo Concerts: Bremen/Lausanne (1973)	The Köln Concert (1975)

Solo Concerts: Bremen/Lausanne is a live solo triple album by jazz pianist Keith Jarrett recorded at the Salle de Spectacles d'Epalinges near Lausanne, Switzerland and the Kleiner Sendesaal in Bremen, Germany on March 20 and July 12, 1973, respectively and released on ECM November that same year—Jarrett's debut solo live album for the label.

== Background ==
Jarrett played in the US with his American quartet between the two European solo concerts.

== Critical reception ==
Professional ratings
Review scores
Source	Rating
AllMusic	5/5 stars
Encyclopedia of Popular Music	5/5 stars
The Penguin Guide to Jazz Recordings	3.5/4 stars
Pitchfork	9.2/10
The Rolling Stone Jazz Record Guide	5/5 stars
DownBeat	5/5 stars

In 1974, DownBeat ranked the album as the best jazz recording of the year

The AllMusic review by Scott Yanow awarded the album 5 stars, stating, "Despite the length, the music never loses one's interest, making this an essential recording for all jazz collections".

Ted Gioia calls it Jarrett's "masterpiece"; "two titanic improvised performances".

According to Mikal Gilmore in Night Beat, "with Bremen-Lausanne and the subsequent Köln Concert, Jarrett found his niche, freely mixing gospel, impressionist, and atonal flights into a consonant whole".

Bill Dobbins notes that the (short) encore on the third side, a boogie-woogie inflected ostinato, owes much to Duke Ellington's New World A-Comin'.

Writing for the now defunct jazz magazine Jazz.com in December 2007, Ted Gioia rated the track "Bremen, Germany, July 12, 1973, Part I" 100/100, stating:

Jazz musicians have always emphasized improvisation in their work. But few have taken this reliance on spontaneous creation to the lengths Keith Jarrett has assayed in his solo concerts. He pioneered the (still rare) concept of an entirely improvised piano recital, wholly inspired by the muse of the moment. But if the concept is exciting, Jarrett's execution of this ambitious idea is even more impressive. The ECM recording of Jarrett's 1973 Bremen concert represented the first attempt to capture this type of work on tape and present it on record. This disk may not have sold as well as The Köln Concert from 1975 or matched the scope of Jarrett's massive Sun Bear Concerts (originally released on ten LPs) from 1976, but for sheer musicality and inventiveness it is hard to top the recital in Bremen. Here is piano music that is rich in complexity, subtle in detail, and completely free of cliché. One of my desert island disks.

In 2023, Pitchfork's Mark Richardson described it as a "career-defining jazz masterpiece" and wrote that the "structural coherence of these lengthy improvisations across two one-hour sets is astonishing" and "where Jarrett's improvisational skill and talent might suggest music described as 'effortless,' some of the beauty of his solo piano work is that you can hear the exertion."

Will Smith, writing for DownBeat Magazine, says, "the word incredible is an understatement here . . . The music is lyrical without being soft or fragile. It is at once a crystalline and yet flowing beauty; a music with the pastoral grace of Bach and the heart of the blues. It is heart-swelling and head-swinging. And it is totally devoid of vacant impressionism and gushing romanticism".

== Track listing ==
=== Original release – ECM 1035–37 ST ===
All tracks are written by Keith Jarrett.

Side I
No.	Title	Length
1.	"Bremen, July 12, 1973, Part I"	18:11

Side II
No.	Title	Length
1.	"Bremen, July 12, 1973, Part II a"	19:40

Side III
No.	Title	Length
1.	"Bremen, July 12, 1973, Part II b"	26:15

Side IV
No.	Title	Length
1.	"Lausanne, March 20, 1973, Part I a"	22:50

Side V
No.	Title	Length
1.	"Lausanne, March 20, 1973, Part I b"	7:20
2.	"Lausanne, March 20, 1973, Part II a"	12:34

Side VI
No.	Title	Length
1.	"Lausanne, March 20, 1973, Part II b"	22:35

=== CD reissue – ECM 1035–37 ===
All tracks are written by Keith Jarrett.

Disc one
No.	Title	Length
1.	"Bremen, July 12, 1973, Part I"	18:11
2.	"Bremen, July 12, 1973, Part II"	45:09

Disc two
No.	Title	Length
1.	"Lausanne, March 20, 1973"	64:53

== Personnel ==
- Keith Jarrett – piano

=== Technical personnel ===
- Manfred Eicher, Keith Jarrett – producer
- Pierre Grandjean, Alan Kobel – recording engineer (Lausanne)
- Rolf Rockstroh – recording engineer (Bremen)
- Kurt Rapp, Martin Wieland – remix engineers
- Barbara and Burkhart Wojirsch – cover design and layout
- Roberto Masotti, A. Raggenbass, Jochen Mönch – photography
