= In the Light (Keith Jarrett album) =

Studio album by Keith Jarrett
- Released: 1974
- Recorded: February 1973
- Studio: Tonstudio Bauer; Ludwigsburg, W. Germany
- Genre: Contemporary classical music
- Length: 1:31:12
- Label: ECM 1033/34 ST
- Producer: Keith Jarrett and Manfred Eicher

Keith Jarrett chronology
Solo Concerts: Bremen/Lausanne (1973)	In the Light (1974)	Treasure Island (1974)

Keith Jarrett orchestral works chronology
In the Light (1974)	Luminessence (1975)

In the Light is a double album of contemporary classical music composed by Keith Jarrett, recorded in February 1973 and released on ECM April the following year—his fourth release for the label.

== Composition and recording ==
In 1984, in an interview with Art Lange for DownBeat Jarrett remarked how he conceived these pieces:

In the Light was a collection of pieces I wrote with no outlet at all. But we all have youthful flows of ideas at a certain stage of our lives, and whatever happens, happens in that period of time. What happened in that period for me was I was not working, I didn’t have a good instrument, I didn’t have a suitable place to live, and writing certainly made some sense. It was a way of expressing something.

In 1974, interviewed by Bob Palmer for DownBeat Jarrett emphasized the production process and how it felt working with Manfred Eicher:

I imagine I'm much more demanding in the studio than the average group leader, and compared to me, Manfred is a fanatic. When we were recording the solo piano pieces for In The Light, he spent an hour and a half moving the microphone millimeters in different directions. Manfred knows what he wants to hear and he will spend hours, days fixing a microphone, or go out and buy a new one. When we were doing In The Light, he went out and bought some small home speakers and put them in the next room, and during playbacks we individually would go in the other room to see how it would sound on somebody's home record player. Plus, he's working with Deutsche Grammophon engineers who… you heard the brass quintet on that album? There are over a hundred splices in that, all of them done just once, and you can't hear any splices.

In the original notes, Keith Jarrett states, "This is a collection of pieces written over a period of six years. It represents my more personal, perhaps even secret, until now, intentions in music."

== Reception ==
Professional ratings
Review scores
Source	Rating
AllMusic	3/5 stars
Encyclopedia of Popular Music	3/5 stars
The Penguin Guide to Jazz	2.5/4 stars
The Rolling Stone Jazz Record Guide	3/5 stars

The AllMusic review by Richard S. Ginell awarded the album 3 stars, noting, "In this compendium of eight works for all kinds of ensembles, the then 28-year-old Jarrett adamantly refuses to be classified, flitting back and forth through the centuries from the baroque to contemporary dissonance, from exuberant counterpoint for brass quintet to homophonic writing for a string section."

== Track listing ==
All compositions by Keith Jarrett

Side A

1. "Metamorphosis" – 19:24

Side B

1. "Fughata for Harpsichord" – 5:29
2. "Brass Quintet" – 20:53

Side C

1. "A Pagan Hymn" – 7:32
2. "String Quartet" – 16:41

Side D

1. "Short Piece for Guitar and Strings" – 3:56
2. "Crystal Moment" (Piece for four Celli and two Trombones) – 4:58
3. "In the Cave, in the Light" – 12:18

== Personnel ==
=== Musicians ===
- Keith Jarrett – piano (tracks B1, C1, D3), gong* (track D3), percussion (track D3)
- Willi Freivogel – flute (track A1)
- Ralph Towner – guitar (track D1)
- The Fritz Sonnleitner Quartet (track C2)
  - Fritz Sonnleitner
  - Günter Klein
  - Siegfried Meinecke
  - Fritza Kiskalt
- The American Brass Quintet (track B2)
- Mladen Gutesha (track A1), Keith Jarrett (tracks D1, D3) – conductor
  - String Section of Südfunk Symphony Orchestra, Stuttgart
- (uncredited sextet) – four celli, two trombones (track D2)

=== Technical personnel ===
- Keith Jarrett, Manfred Eicher – production
- Kurt Rapp, Martin Wieland and M. Scheuermann – recording engineers
- Barbara and Burkhart Wojirsch – cover design and layout
- R Truckenmüller – photography
- Georgesyves Braunschweig – photography

=== Notes ===
- *As stated in the original notes: "Mr. Keith Jarrett plays (of course) PAISTE cymbals and a 38'' Symphony Gong"
