= Mladen Guteša =

Yugoslav-German composer (1923 – 2015)

- Also known as: Gert Bauer, Sonny Steffen, Chris Halmon
- Born: December 16, 1923; Sarajevo, Kingdom of Yugoslavia
- Died: December 2, 2015 (aged 91) Belgrade, Serbia
- Genres: Jazz; blues
- Occupations: Composer; conductor; trombonist
- Instrument: Trombone

Mladen "Bobby" Guteša (Serbian Cyrillic: Младен Гутеша; 16 December 1923 – 2 December 2015), also known as Mladen Gutesha, was an orchestra conductor, composer, and arranger of Serbo-Yugoslav origin who lived and worked in Germany and Switzerland. He worked under his real name, as well as the pseudonyms Gert Bauer, Sonny Steffen, and Chris Halmon. He mainly composed pieces for jazz, symphony and dance orchestras, as well as film. Contemporary critics have often referred to him as "the Quincy Jones of Yugoslav jazz".

== Life and work ==
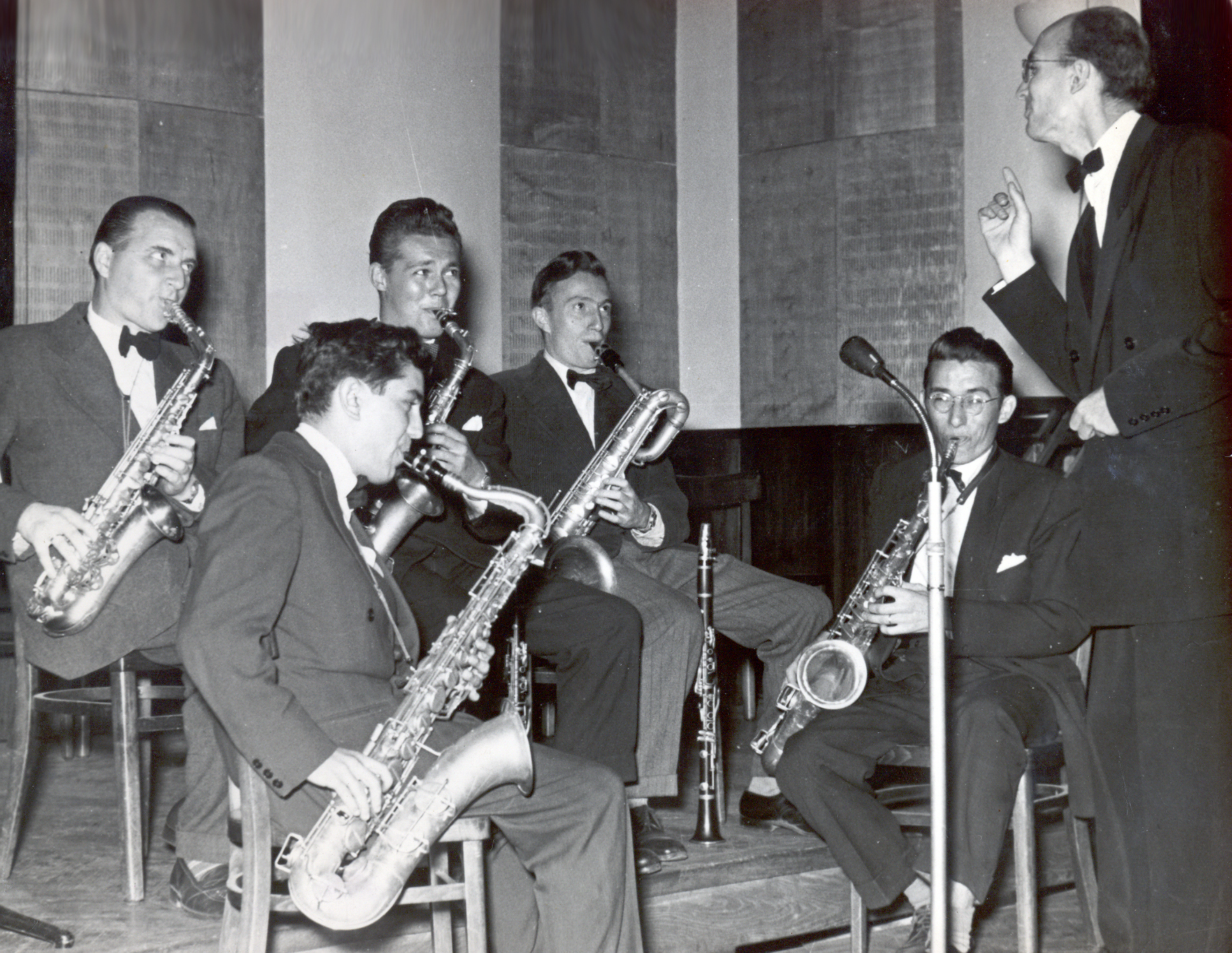
Guteša (furthest right) conducting Vladimir Plotnjikov, Vladimir Dajzinger, Mihailo Živanović, Eduard Sađil and Karlo Takač (1952)

Guteša taught himself the trombone in 1941 and studied conducting at the Faculty of Music at the University of Arts in Belgrade for five years, from 1945 to 1949. While still a student, he played trombone with the Belgrade Radio Orchestra starting from 1943. In 1946 he became a trombonist in Bojan Adamič's orchestra. In 1948, he founded Radio Belgrade's large jazz and dance orchestra (Big Band RTS), which he conducted until 1953.

He emigrated to Germany the same year, where he played the trombone in jazz ensembles in US officers' clubs in Frankfurt. There he came into contact with Benny Goodman and arranged several pieces for him. Guteša worked as a trombonist for Kurt Edelhagen and also became a sought-after arranger for German radio stations, where he also wrote the arrangements (Walkin' and 'Round Midnight) for productions with Miles Davis in 1957. He also arranged for the Modern Jazz Quartet and Lee Konitz.

From 1955 to 1958, Guteša was an arranger for Erwin Lehn's Südfunk Dance Orchestra. Süddeutsche Rundfunk appointed him as director of its studio orchestra. In 1955 he became the arranger of the Stuttgart Radio Symphony Orchestra. Between 1974 and 1979 he collaborated with the ECM label as conductor of the Stuttgart Radio Symphony Orchestra while recording albums with Norwegian guitarist Terje Rypdal, saxophonist Jan Garbarek and American pianist Keith Jarrett.

In the 1960s he also worked as a film composer (e.g. the Kommissar X films Kiss Kiss, Kill Kill and Inspector X – In den Klauen des goldenen Drachen by director Gianfranco Parolini); in total he composed for 60 feature films. He also released records such as The Balkan in My Soul (SABA) and Rockin' Bach Dimensions (MPS Records, 1973). In the Munich Trixi recording studio he recorded three productions with the same rhythm section: Sigi Schwab, Eberhard Weber and Lala Kovačev worked together with Chris Hinze, Benny Bailey and Charlie Mariano/Ack van Rooyen. In 1986 Guteša was given a teaching position at the Swiss Jazz School in Bern. In 1988 he retired from composing.

== Selected discography ==
- The Adriatic Orchestra (1967) with Georg Hermann and his Orchestra
- ...Und... (1972) with Jean Warland, Lala Kovačev, Sigi Schwab
- Rockin' Bach Dimensions (1973) with Ack van Rooyen, Sigi Schwab, Horst Jankowski, Herb Geller, Åke Persson, Wolfgang Dauner, Erik van Lier
- Flight to Frisco (1974) with Orchestra Bobby Gutesha
- Islands (1976) with Benny Bailey, Sigi Schwab, Eberhard Weber, Lala Kovačev (Enja Records)
- Wide and Blue (1978) with Chris Hinze, Sigi Schwab, Eberhard Weber, Lala Kovačev (EMI)
- Some Kind of Changes (1982) with Charlie Mariano, Ack van Rooyen, Sigi Schwab, Eberhard Weber, Lala Kovačev (Calig)
- Metropolitan Sounds (1984) with Thomas Stabenow, Joe Gallardo, Don Rader, Johannes Faber
- Strictly Instrumental (1989) with Thomas Stabenow, Klaus Wagenleiter, Joe Gallardo, Johannes Faber

== Bibliography ==
- Case, Brian; Britt, Stan (1978). Ilustrirana Jazz Enciklopedija (in Serbo-Croatian). Translated by Vrdoljak, Dražen. Zagreb: Mladost (published 1980).
- Kovač, Kornelije (2010). Fusnota: priče o pesmama koje su obeležile YU-rock scenu (in Serbo-Croatian). Belgrade: Laguna. ISBN 978-86-521-0322-5.
