= The Köln Concert =

Live album by Keith Jarrett
- Released: 30 November 1975
- Recorded: 24 January 1975
- Venue: Opera House, Cologne, West Germany
- Length: 1:06:07
- Label: ECM 1064/65 ST
- Producer: Manfred Eicher

Keith Jarrett chronology
Death and the Flower (1975)	The Köln Concert (1975)	Arbour Zena (1976)

Keith Jarrett solo piano chronology
Solo Concerts: Bremen/Lausanne (1973)	The Köln Concert (1975)	Staircase (1977)

The Köln Concert is a live solo double album by pianist Keith Jarrett recorded at the Opera House in Köln (Cologne), West Germany, on 24 January 1975 and released on ECM Records later that year. It is the best-selling solo album in jazz history and the best-selling piano album. In 2025, the album was deemed "culturally, historically, or aesthetically significant" by the Library of Congress and selected for preservation in the National Recording Registry.

== Concert and recording ==
The concert was organized by 18-year-old Vera Brandes, then Germany's youngest concert promoter. The concert took place on a Friday at the late hour of 11:30 pm, following an earlier opera performance. The late time was the only one the administration would make available to Brandes for a jazz concert—the first at the Köln Opera House. The show was sold out, filled to capacity at over 1,400 people at a ticket price of 4 DM.

At Jarrett's request, Brandes had selected a Bösendorfer 290 Imperial concert grand piano for the performance. However, there was some confusion by the opera house staff and instead they found another Bösendorfer piano backstage—a much smaller baby grand piano—and, assuming it was the one requested, placed it on the stage. The error was discovered too late for the correct Bösendorfer to be delivered to the venue in time for the evening's concert. The piano they had was intended for rehearsals only and was in poor condition and required several hours of tuning and adjustment to make it playable. The instrument was tinny and thin in the upper registers and weak in the bass register, and the pedals did not work properly. While Brandes made an attempt and procured another grand piano up to Jarrett's standards to be delivered as an emergency, the piano tuner who had meanwhile arrived to fix the baby grand warned her that transporting a grand piano without the proper equipment at low temperatures in the middle of a rainstorm would irreparably damage the instrument, forcing Brandes to stick to the small one.

Jarrett had performed a few days earlier in Lausanne, Switzerland and although Brandes had sent him a ticket for a flight to Cologne on the record company's request, he exchanged the ticket for cash and joined ECM Records producer Manfred Eicher travelling to Cologne by car in Eicher's old Renault 4, so they arrived at the opera house late in the afternoon tired after the exhaustingly long drive. Jarrett had not slept well in several nights and was in pain from back problems, having to wear a brace as a result. After trying out the substandard piano and learning a replacement instrument was not available, Jarrett nearly refused to play and was about to leave, but Brandes was able to convince him to perform anyway as the concert was scheduled to begin in just a few hours. Brandes had booked a table at a restaurant in advance of the performance, but delays meant Jarrett was able to eat very little of the meal before leaving. Ultimately, Jarrett decided to play largely because the recording equipment was already set up. Jarrett used ostinatos and rolling left-hand rhythmic figures during his performance to give the effect of stronger bass notes, and concentrated his playing in the middle portion of the keyboard. Eicher later said: "Probably [Jarrett] played it the way he did because it was not a good piano. Because he could not fall in love with the sound of it, he found another way to get the most out of it."

A notable aspect of the concert was Jarrett's ability to produce very extensive improvised material over a vamp of one or two chords for prolonged periods of time. In Part I, he spends almost 12 minutes vamping over the chords Am7 (A minor 7) to G major, sometimes in a slow, rubato feel, and other times in a bluesy, gospel rock feel. For about the last 6 minutes of Part I, he vamps over an A major theme. Roughly the first 8 minutes of Part II A is a vamp over a D major groove with a repeated bass vamp in the left hand, and in Part IIb, Jarrett improvises over an F♯ minor vamp for about the first 6 minutes.

The performance was recorded by ECM Records engineer Martin Wieland using a pair of Neumann U 67 vacuum-tube powered condenser microphones and a Telefunken M-5 portable tape machine. The recording is in three parts, lasting about 26 minutes, 34 minutes, and 7 minutes respectively. As it was originally programmed for vinyl LP, the second part was split into sections labelled "IIa" and "IIb". The third part, labelled "IIc", was actually the final piece, a separate encore. "IIc" is a reinterpretation of a composition by Keith Jarrett, "Memories of Tomorrow", which can be heard during a trio concert with Gus Nemeth (double bass) and Paul Motian (percussion) given in Oslo in December 1969 and broadcast in 1972 on the Norwegian public television channel NRK.

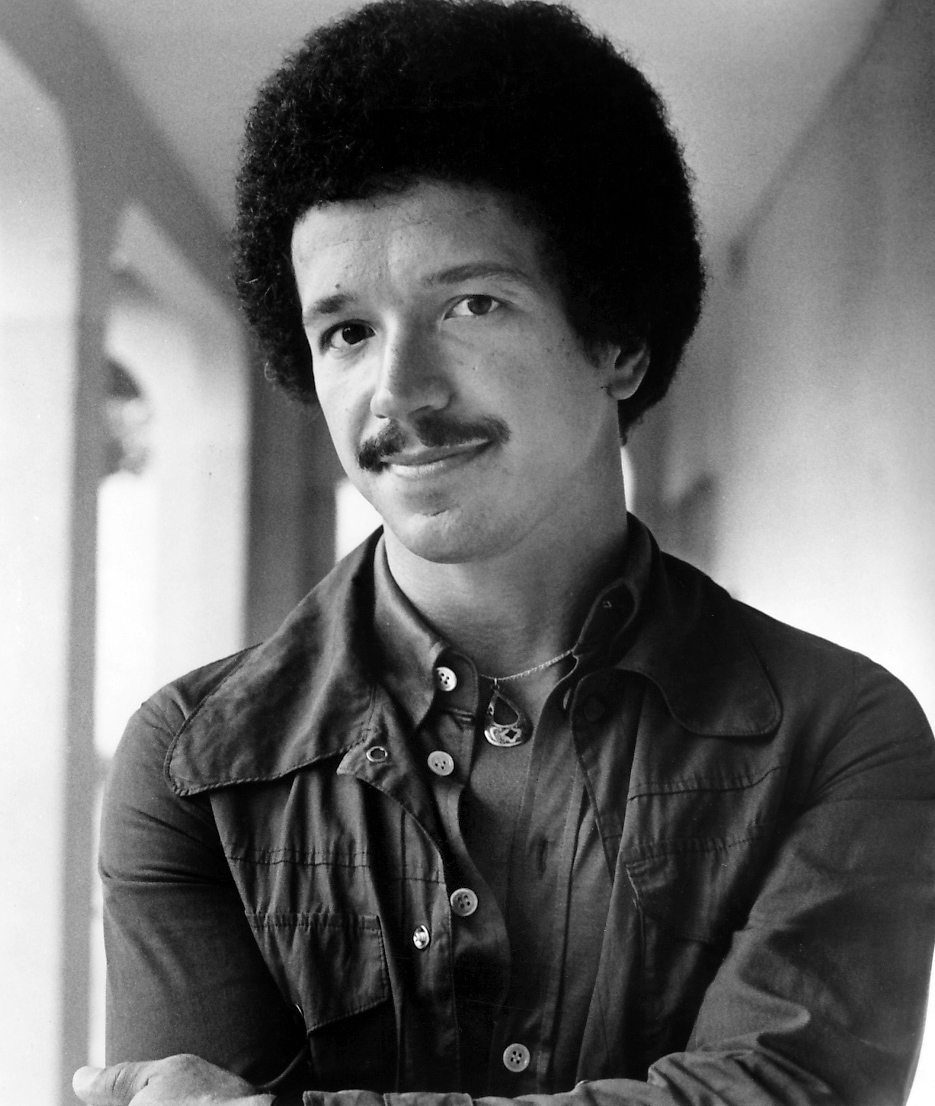
Jarrett in 1975

Subtle laughter may be heard from the audience at the very beginning of "Part I" in response to Jarrett's quoting of the melody of the signal bell which announces the beginning of an opera or concert to patrons at the Köln Opera House, the notes of which are G D C G A D. An article from the German newspaper Die Welt disputed this theory in stating that this pattern has never been used by the Köln Opera House and that it might rather be the very end of the melody of the song "The Faithful Hussar" played by the chiming clock of the house 4711 located close to the opera house, a tune Keith Jarrett might have heard just before going on stage. Jarrett himself noted that while he does not remember doing it consciously, he credits it for putting the audience in a good mood that helped him through a difficult concert experience.

== Transcription ==
Subsequent to the release of The Köln Concert, Jarrett was asked by pianists, musicologists and others to publish the music. For years he resisted such requests since, as he said, the music played was improvised "on a certain night and should go as quickly as it comes". In 1990, Jarrett finally agreed to publish an authorized transcription but with the recommendation that every pianist intending to play the piece should use the recording itself as the final word.

== Reception ==
Professional ratings
Review scores
Source	Rating
AllMusic	5/5 stars
The Encyclopedia of Popular Music	5/5 stars
The Penguin Guide to Jazz	4/4 stars
Record Collector	5/5 stars
The Rolling Stone Jazz Record Guide	4/5 stars
Tom Hull – on the Web	A−

The Penguin Guide to Jazz Recordings, in 2008, selected the album as part of its suggested "core collection" of essential recordings.

According to music critic Tom Hull, the album "cemented his reputation as the top pianist of his generation".

In 2000, it was voted number 357 in Colin Larkin's All Time Top 1000 Albums.

The album was included in Robert Dimery's book 1001 Albums You Must Hear Before You Die.

== Legacy ==
In 2011 the Witness program on the BBC World Service broadcast "Keith Jarrett in Cologne" in which Vera Brandes describes the difficulties surrounding the performance.

In 2019 the performance was the subject of an episode of the "Cautionary Tales" podcast, by British journalist and broadcaster Tim Harford, which looked at the role of obstacles and difficulties in fostering the creative process.

It became the best-selling piano recording of all time, as well as the best-selling jazz solo album, with sales of around 4 million.

== Usage in popular culture ==
- The 1980 Nicolas Roeg movie Bad Timing has part of the concert in its soundtrack.
- The 1993 Nanni Moretti movie Caro diario ("Dear Diary") has part of the concert in its soundtrack.

In a 1992 interview with the German magazine Der Spiegel, Jarrett complained that the album had become nothing more than a soundtrack and also said that "We also have to learn to forget music. Otherwise we become addicted to the past."

Several tributes were created for the 50th anniversary of the Köln Concert. The German film entitled Köln 75, directed by Ido Fluk, which tells the story of this concert, premiered at the Berlinale 2025 with Vera Brandes played by Mala Emde, Keith Jarrett by John Magaro and Manfred Eicher by Alexander Scheer. A French documentary Köln Tracks, directed by Vincent Duceau and scheduled for release in 2026, investigates the piano used by Keith Jarrett during this concert. A graphic novel is also being prepared.

== Track listing ==
=== Original release – ECM 1064/65 ST ===
All tracks are written by Keith Jarrett.

Side I
No.	Title	Length
1.	"Part I"	26:01

Side II
No.	Title	Length
1.	"Part II a"	14:54

Side III
No.	Title	Length
1.	"Part II b"	18:13

Side IV
No.	Title	Length
1.	"Part II c"	6:56
Total length:		1:06:07

The first three tracks were issued on CD in 1983, followed by a reissue with all four tracks in 1984. There is also a single-layer SACD, released by ECM for the Japanese market.

== Personnel ==
- Keith Jarrett – piano

=== Technical personnel ===
- Manfred Eicher – producer
- Martin Wieland – engineer
- Barbara and Burkhart Wojirsch – cover design
- Wolfgang Frankenstein – photography

== Charts ==
2011 chart performance for The Köln Concert
Chart (2011)	Peak position
Belgian Albums (Ultratop Flanders)	60
Italian Albums (FIMI)	74
Swedish Albums (Sverigetopplistan)	17
Swiss Albums (Schweizer Hitparade)	14
UK Jazz & Blues Albums (Official Charts)	6

2018 chart performance for The Köln Concert
Chart (2018)	Peak position
Croatian International Albums (HDU)	22

2024–2026 chart performance for The Köln Concert
Chart (2024–2026)	Peak position
Belgian Albums (Ultratop Flanders)	54
French Jazz Albums (SNEP)	20
Japanese Hot Albums (Billboard Japan)	83
