= Facing You =

Studio album by Keith Jarrett
- Released: March 1972
- Recorded: November 10, 1971
- Studio: Arne Bendiksen Studio; Oslo, Norway
- Length: 47:37
- Label: ECM 1017 ST
- Producer: Manfred Eicher

Keith Jarrett chronology
The Mourning of a Star (1971)	Facing You (1972)	Birth (1972)

Keith Jarrett solo piano chronology
Facing You (1972)	Solo Concerts: Bremen/Lausanne (1973)

Facing You is a solo album by jazz pianist Keith Jarrett recorded on November 10, 1971, and released on ECM March the following year as Jarrett's first with the label. The album is praised as "a hallmark recording of solo piano" that "altered the course of jazz".

== Background ==
Facing You was recorded in Oslo, Norway, on November 10; Jarrett had a day off from performing with the Miles Davis Septet.

== Aftermath and legacy ==
In a 2000 interview with Terry Gross, Jarrett explained how the idea of long solo piano concerts began:

It started out maybe as a result of recording 'Facing You', I can’t remember. But it started out, I remember, at the Heidelberg Jazz Festival, where I was supposedly, I wasn’t very well-known, I guess. And I came out and did a solo thing. And it was tunes, but I started to connect them somehow. Like, I’d have these transitional parts that connected everything. And then that somehow just moved slowly into the expanded solo concert, where there are no songs whatsoever and everything is improvised on the spot.

In a DownBeat interview with Bob Palmer, Jarrett expressed his gratitude to Eicher for the opportunity to record for ECM: "If I hadn't found him there would be no solo albums, no Facing You, let alone a successful triple album. I would have a desk full of scores that have never been rehearsed, not to mention played or recorded. There's no way I can repay that possibility having come to me so early and at such a good time except to produce more music for ECM. They took the risk and the expense, or Manfred did."

== Critical reception ==
Professional ratings
Review scores
Source	Rating
AllMusic	4.5/5 stars
Encyclopedia of Popular Music	3/5 stars
The Penguin Guide to Jazz	3.5/4 stars
The Rolling Stone Jazz Record Guide	4/5 stars
Tom Hull	B+
DownBeat	5/5 stars

In a 1972 review for Rolling Stone, Bob Palmer called the album "perhaps the best solo piano recording since Art Tatum left us."

The album won the Grand Prix des Festivals at Montreux in 1973.

Jose Balleras of DownBeat in a 1975 review gave the album 5 stars concluding "this record is so inspired that it's tempting to believe this is actually happening" and "Jarrett doesn't swing, he flows."

The AllMusic review by Michael G. Nastos awarded the album 4½ stars, stating:

A remarkable effort that reveals more and more with each listen, this recording has stood the test of time, and is unquestionably a Top Three recording in Keith Jarrett's long and storied career.... Facing You is one of the most important recordings in contemporary jazz for several reasons, aside from being beautifully conceived and executed by pianist Keith Jarrett. It is a hallmark recording of solo piano in any discipline, a signature piece in the early ECM label discography, a distinct departure from mainstream jazz, a breakthrough for Jarrett, and a studio prelude for his most famous solo project to follow, The Köln Concert.

In October 2007, writing for jazz.com, Ted Gioia gave the track "In Front" a 100/100 rating, stating:

Here on the opening track of his first solo piano recording, Keith Jarrett announces a new era of jazz keyboard music. Even today, decades later, we can hear the repercussions in contemporary piano stylings. Jarrett helped shape a new language for improvised music, demonstrated the marvels of his conception and touch, explored novel paths of thematic development, and recalibrated the roles of the left and right hands in piano jazz —all in the course of a 10-minute performance. My favorite moments: the funky ostinato groove that kicks in right before the four minute mark, and then the shimmering resolution that dawns two minutes later. Jarrett still had his first solo concert records —the edifices of Bremen, Lausanne and Köln—ahead of him, but here at age 26 he had arrived, no longer the young prodigy of jazz, but a mature artist charting the future.

Writing for JazzTimes in 2011, pianist Kenny Werner stated:

There are so many things in this piece, starting with Jarrett's interactive left hand and subtle right-hand accompaniment. The harmonies are unquestioningly new; all the beautiful complexities of the head release into a hybrid boogie-woogie or barrelhouse style. In a period when jazz was hipper and unsentimental, Jarrett reintroduced early American elements that are taken for granted today-sort of inventing the country/gospel-style harmony employed by many contemporary artists. Similarly, in the '60s and '70s, the style of linear playing over chord changes tended to be more rhythmic than melodic and generally based on pentatonic scales. Jarrett reintroduced an element of ornamentation that had not been heard since the music of Liszt and Chopin... although his most famous solo recording, The Köln Concert, and all subsequent solo recordings, are much better known to the public, for me his first solo recording, Facing You, reigns supreme. Its innovative approach to composition and musical development was shocking at the time. Jarrett radiated as much warmth, heart and beauty in his playing as he did virtuosity and intellect. Jarrett’s playing represents new and innovative levels of harmonic, rhythmic and melodic development bundled with the vastest creativity imaginable. It was a new standard of playing in its time and still is today.

== Track listing ==
All tracks are written by Keith Jarrett.

Side I
No.	Title	Length
1.	"In Front"	10:09
2.	"Ritooria"	5:57
3.	"Lalene"	8:39
Total length:		24:45

Side II
No.	Title	Length
1.	"My Lady, My Child"	7:24
2.	"Landscape for Future Earth"	3:36
3.	"Starbright"	5:07
4.	"Vapallia"	3:57
5.	"Semblence"	3:02
Total length:		23:06 47:51

== Personnel ==
- Keith Jarrett – piano

=== Technical personnel ===
- Manfred Eicher – producer
- Jan Erik Kongshaug – recording engineer
- Danny Michael – photography
- Barbara and Burkhart Wojirsch – cover design and layout
