= El Juicio (The Judgement) =

Studio album by Keith Jarrett
- Released: 1975
- Recorded: July 8–9, 15–16, 1971
- Studios: Atlantic, New York City, US
- Genre: Jazz
- Length: 39:11
- Label: Atlantic
- Producer: George Avakian

Keith Jarrett chronology
Luminessence (1975)	El Juicio (The Judgement) (1975)	Back Hand (1975)

Keith Jarrett American Group chronology
Treasure Island (1974)	El Juicio (The Judgement) (1975)	Back Hand (1975)

El Juicio (The Judgement) is an album by pianist Keith Jarrett recorded in 1971 and released in 1975. On four days in July and one in August 1971, Jarrett went into the Atlantic Recording Studios with his trio (Charlie Haden and Paul Motian), plus Dewey Redman on tenor saxophone, and produced enough music for three albums: The Mourning of a Star (released in 1971), El Juicio (The Judgement) and Birth (released in 1972). Accordingly, the 1971 sessions mark the emergence of what would be later called Jarrett's "American quartet."

Redman would not join the working group as a full member until 1972, and the new quartet’s first album to make it to the public would be Birth. When Atlantic Records released El Juicio in 1975 the group had already signed with Impulse! and was steadily recording under that label.

== Reception ==
Professional ratings
Review scores
Source	Rating
The Penguin Guide to Jazz	4/4 stars
AllMusic	3/5 stars

The authors of the Penguin Guide to Jazz wrote: "for us El Juicio remains a high-point... The joyous countrified swing of 'Gypsy Moth' and 'Toll Road' could hardly be more infectious, or more loosely structured, at an opposite remove to the dour atmosphere of 'El Juicio' itself, a strange, brooding tone-poem which if the cover art is anything by way of confirmation conjures up first and last things, a musical eschatology. Also very different... is the experimental melodism of 'Piece for Ornette'. It exists in two forms, one at nine and a quarter minutes, the other at 12 seconds! It isn't a long record... but it has a freshness of approach and depth of musical intelligence that has never tarnished."

Pianist Ethan Iverson singled out the track "Pardon My Rags" for praise, calling it "almost silly, certainly joyous", and commenting: "While the 'rags' on Somewhere Before might stump a long-time Jarrett listener who doesn't know the early years, 'Pardon My Rags' is obviously Jarrett. The flow, especially at this speed, is unique. Amazing to think that Earl Hines, Teddy Wilson, Mary Lou Williams, Thelonious Monk and Eubie Blake were all still alive at this moment."

== Track listing ==
All compositions by Keith Jarrett

1. "Gypsy Moth" - 8:18
2. "Toll Road" - 5:44
3. "Pardon My Rags" - 2:43
4. "Pre-Judgement Atmosphere" - 2:35
5. "El Juicio" - 10:22
6. "Piece for Ornette (L.V.)" - 9:16
7. "Piece for Ornette (S.V.)" - 0:12

== Personnel ==
- Keith Jarrett - piano, soprano saxophone, steel drums, percussion
- Dewey Redman - tenor saxophone, alto saxophone (on "Gypsy Moth"), steel drums, percussion
- Charlie Haden - double bass, steel drums, percussion
- Paul Motian - drums, steel drums, percussion
