= Keith Jarrett =

American pianist and composer (born 1945)

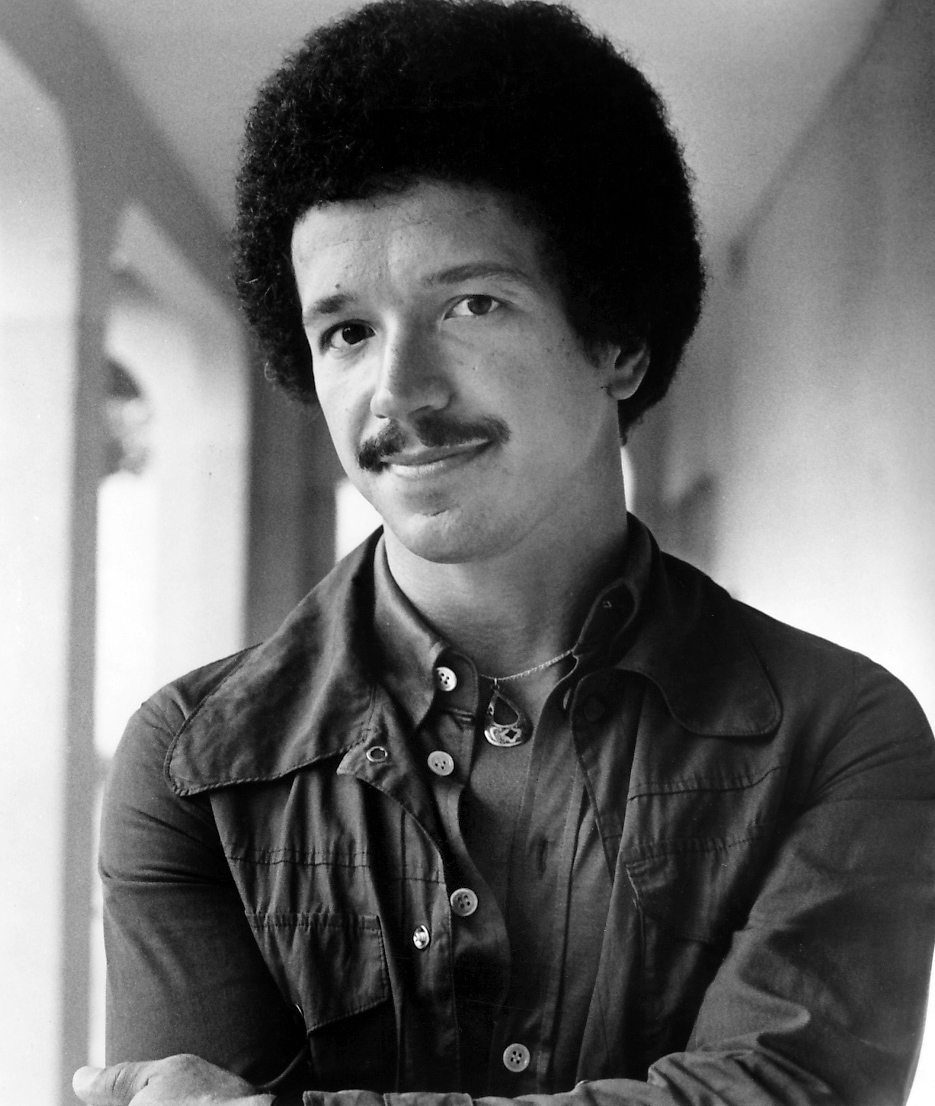
- Jarrett in 1975

Background information
- Born: May 8, 1945 (age 81); Allentown, Pennsylvania, U.S.
- Genres: Jazz; classical; jazz fusion; free improvisation
- Occupations: Musician; composer
- Instruments: Piano; harpsichord
- Years active: 1966–2018
- Labels: Atlantic; Columbia; ECM; Impulse!; Universal Classics
- Website: keith-jarrett.de/en

Keith Jarrett (born May 8, 1945) is an American pianist and composer. Jarrett started his career with Art Blakey and later moved on to play with Charles Lloyd and Miles Davis. Since the early 1970s, he has also been a group leader and solo performer in jazz, jazz fusion, and classical music. His improvisations draw from the traditions of jazz and other genres, including Western classical music, gospel, blues, and ethnic folk music.

His album The Köln Concert, released in 1975, is the best-selling piano recording in history. In 2008, he was inducted into the DownBeat Jazz Hall of Fame in the magazine's 73rd Annual Readers' Poll.

In 2003, Jarrett received the Polar Music Prize and was the first recipient to be recognized with the prizes for both contemporary and classical music. In 2004, he received the Léonie Sonning Music Prize.

In February 2018, Jarrett suffered a stroke and has been unable to perform since. A second stroke in May 2018 left him partially paralyzed and unable to play with his left hand.

== Early life and education ==
Jarrett was born on May 8, 1945, in Allentown, Pennsylvania, to a mother of Slovenian descent. Jarrett's grandmother was born in Segovci, near Apače in Slovenia. Jarrett's father was of mostly German descent. He grew up in suburban Allentown with significant early exposure to music.

Jarrett possesses absolute pitch and displayed prodigious musical talents as a young child. He began piano lessons before his third birthday. At age five, he appeared on a television talent program hosted by swing bandleader Paul Whiteman. He performed in his first formal piano recital at the age of seven, playing works by composers such as Bach, Beethoven, Mozart, and Saint-Saëns, and ending with two of his own compositions. Encouraged by his mother, he took classical piano lessons with a series of teachers, including Eleanor Sokoloff of the Curtis Institute of Music in Philadelphia.

Jarrett attended Emmaus High School in Emmaus, Pennsylvania, where he learned jazz and became proficient in it. He developed a strong interest in contemporary jazz and was inspired by a Dave Brubeck performance he attended in New Hope. He was invited to study classical composition in Paris with Nadia Boulanger, but he was already leaning toward jazz and turned it down.

After his graduation from Emmaus High School in 1963, Jarrett moved to Boston to attend Berklee College of Music and play cocktail piano in local Boston clubs.

== Career ==
=== The Jazz Messengers ===
In 1964, Jarrett moved to New York City, where he played at the Village Vanguard in Greenwich Village. Art Blakey hired Jarrett to play with The Jazz Messengers. Jarrett's appearance on the Messengers' live album Buttercorn Lady (1966) marked his commercial recording debut. However, there was friction between Blakey and Jarrett, and Jarrett left after four months of touring.

=== Charles Lloyd Quartet ===
During a show, he was noticed by Jack DeJohnette, who recommended Jarrett to his band leader Charles Lloyd. The Charles Lloyd Quartet had formed not long before and was exploring open, improvised forms while building supple grooves, and it was moving into terrain that was also being explored, although from another stylistic background, by some of the psychedelic rock bands of the West Coast. Their 1966 album Forest Flower was one of the most successful jazz recordings of the mid-1960s. They were invited to play The Fillmore in San Francisco, and won over the local hippie audience. The quartet toured across the U.S. and Europe, including appearances in Leningrad and Moscow. Their concert at London's Royal Albert Hall was attended by The Beatles. The band was profiled in Time and Harper's Magazine, which made Jarrett a popular musician in rock and jazz. The tour also laid the foundation for a lasting musical bond with DeJohnette.

Jarrett began to record his own tracks as a leader of small groups, at first in a trio with Charlie Haden and Paul Motian. Life Between the Exit Signs (1967), his first album as a band leader, was released by Vortex and was followed by Restoration Ruin (1968), which Thom Jurek of AllMusic later wrote was "a curiosity in his catalog". Not only does Jarrett barely touch the piano, but he plays all the other instruments on what is essentially a folk-rock album; he also sings. Somewhere Before, another trio album with Haden and Motian, was released in 1968 on Atlantic Records.

=== Miles Davis ===
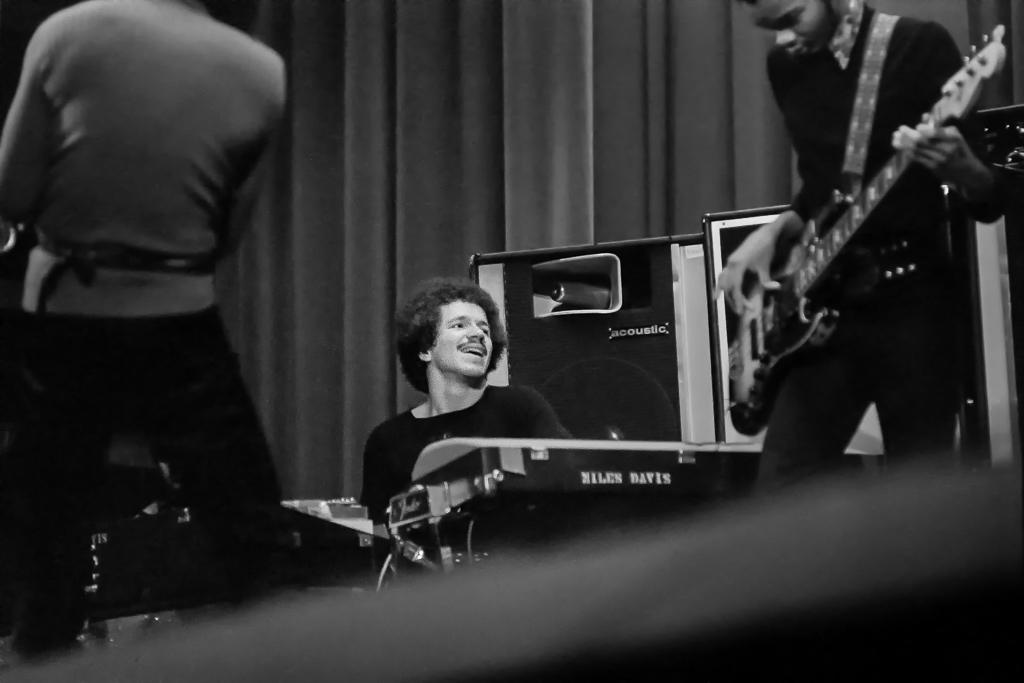
Jarrett performing as part of Miles Davis's septet in November 1971

The Charles Lloyd Quartet with Jarrett, Ron McClure, and DeJohnette came to an end in 1968 after their recording of Soundtrack because of money disputes and artistic differences. Jarrett was asked to join the Miles Davis group after the trumpeter heard him in a New York City club. During his tenure with Davis, Jarrett played both electronic organ and Rhodes piano, alternating with Chick Corea. The two appear side by side on some 1970 recordings, including the Isle of Wight Festival performance of August 1970 in the film Miles Electric: A Different Kind of Blue and on Bitches Brew Live. After Corea left in 1970, Jarrett often played electric piano and organ simultaneously. Despite his growing dislike of amplified music and electric instruments within jazz, Jarrett continued with the group out of respect for Davis and because of his desire to work with DeJohnette. Jarrett has often cited Davis as a vital musical and personal influence on his own thinking about music and improvisation.

Jarrett performs on several Davis albums, including Miles Davis at Fillmore, recorded June 17–20, 1970, at Fillmore East in New York City, and The Cellar Door Sessions 1970, recorded December 16–19, 1970, at The Cellar Door club in Washington, D.C.. His keyboard playing features prominently on Live-Evil and he plays electric organ on Get Up with It. Some other tracks from this period were released much later.

DeJohnette left Davis's band in the middle of 1971, and Jarrett followed in December. Jarrett later reflected: "When Jack left I knew I was going to have to leave ... Nobody knew what Jack knew and could do what he could do simultaneously. That was the end of the flexibility of the band."

=== 1970s quartets and Manfred Eicher ===
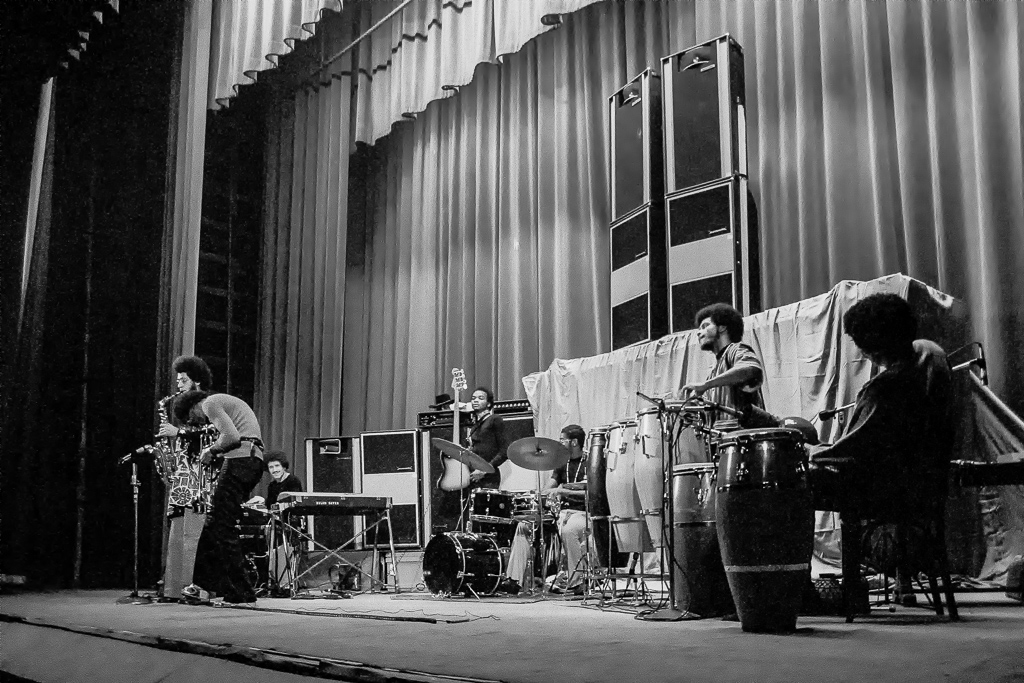
Jarrett playing with Miles Davis in November 1971

In 1971, Jarrett, Haden, and Motian participated in a four-day session for Atlantic Records during which they recorded the trio album The Mourning of a Star and two albums, El Juicio (The Judgement) and Birth, on which the trio was augmented by saxophonist Dewey Redman. Redman became an official member of the group, which later became referred to as Jarrett's "American quartet". They would go on to record over a dozen albums over five years. The group was often supplemented by an extra percussionist, such as Danny Johnson, Guilherme Franco, or Airto Moreira, and occasionally by guitarist Sam Brown.

Later in 1971, the quartet, with Brown and Moreira, recorded Expectations for Columbia Records, with string and brass arrangements by Jarrett. However, Columbia suddenly dropped Jarrett in favor of Herbie Hancock, and Jarrett's manager negotiated a contract with Impulse! Records, for whom the group would record eight albums.

The quartet members played various instruments. Jarrett played soprano saxophone, recorder, banjo, percussion, and piano. Redman played musette, a Chinese double-reed instrument, and percussion, and Motian and Haden played a variety of percussion. Haden also produced a variety of unusual plucked and percussive sounds with his acoustic bass, running it through a wah-wah pedal for one track ("Mortgage on My Soul" on the album Birth). Byablue and Bop-Be, albums recorded for Impulse!, feature the compositions of Haden, Motian, and Redman, as opposed to Jarrett's own, which dominated the previous albums. Jarrett's compositions and the musical identities of the group members gave this ensemble a distinctive sound. The quartet's music is an amalgam of free jazz, straight-ahead post-bop, gospel music, and exotic, Middle-Eastern-sounding improvisations.

During this time, Jarrett received a letter from producer Manfred Eicher asking if he would like to record for the relatively new ECM label. Jarrett was impressed by the fact that Eicher was primarily concerned with musical quality, as opposed to financial gain. Jarrett's American quartet released two albums, The Survivors' Suite and Eyes of the Heart, on ECM, and the label also issued Ruta and Daitya, consisting of duo tracks featuring Jarrett and DeJohnette recorded in early 1971 and tracks with Miles Davis after Jarrett gave tapes of the session to Eicher.

In 1972, Eicher proposed that Jarrett work with Norwegian saxophonist Jan Garbarek, whom Jarrett had met while in Europe with Charles Lloyd during the late 1960s. Their initial collaborations laid the groundwork for what would become referred to as Jarrett's "European quartet", which also featured Palle Danielsson on bass and Jon Christensen on drums. The group recorded five albums for ECM, each played in a style similar to that of the American quartet but with many of the avant-garde and Americana elements replaced by the European folk and classical music influences that characterized the work of ECM artists at the time.

=== Solo piano ===
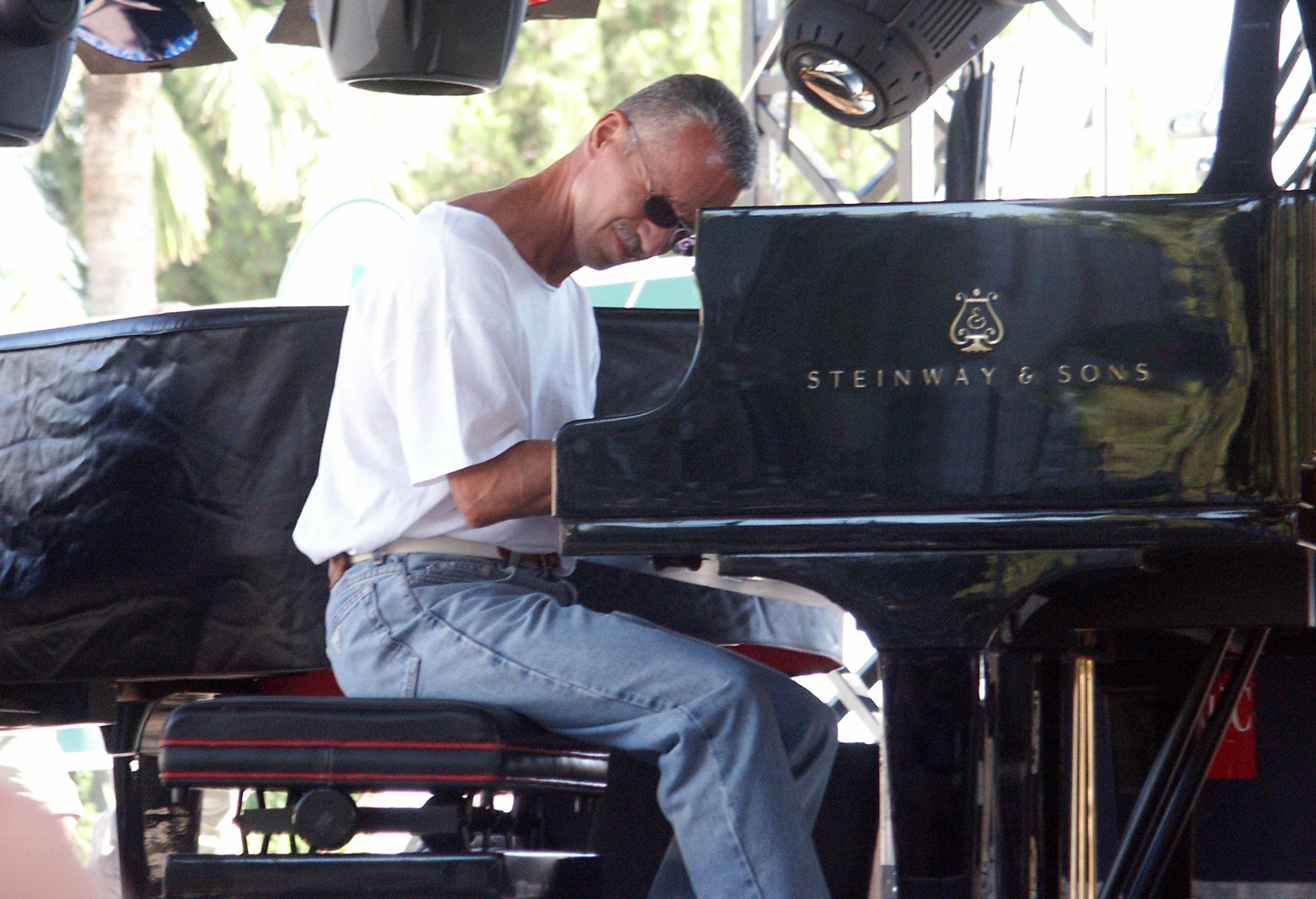
Jarrett performing in Antibes, France, in July 2003

Jarrett recorded a few solo pieces live under the guidance of Miles Davis at the Cellar Door in Washington, D.C., in December 1970. These were done on electric pianos (Rhodes and Contempo). Most parts of these recorded sets were released in 2007 on The Cellar Door Sessions, featuring four improvisations by Jarrett.

Jarrett's first album for ECM, Facing You, was released in 1971. He has continued to record solo studio piano albums intermittently throughout his career, including Staircase (1976), Invocations / The Moth and the Flame (1981), and The Melody at Night, with You (1999). Book of Ways (1986) is a studio recording of clavichord solos.

In 1973, Jarrett began playing totally improvised solo concerts, and it is the popularity of these concert recordings that made him one of the best-selling jazz artists in history. Albums released from these concerts were Solo Concerts: Bremen/Lausanne (1973), which Time magazine named "Jazz Album of the Year", The Köln Concert (1975), which became the best-selling piano recording in history, and Sun Bear Concerts (1976), a 10-LP (and later 6-CD) box set. Another of Jarrett's solo concerts, Dark Intervals, was released in 1987.

After a hiatus, Jarrett returned to extended solo improvised concert format with Paris Concert (1990), Vienna Concert (1991), Live at the Royal Festival Hall (1991), and La Scala (1995). These later concerts tended to be more influenced by classical music than the earlier ones, reflecting his interest in composers such as Bach and Shostakovich. In the liner notes to Vienna Concert, Jarrett named the performance his greatest achievement and the fulfillment of everything he was aiming to accomplish; "I have courted the fire for a very long time, and many sparks have flown in the past, but the music on this recording speaks, finally, the language of the flame itself", he wrote.

Jarrett has commented that his best performances have been when he has had only the slightest notion of what he was going to play at the next moment. He also said that most people don't know "what he does" which relates to what Miles Davis said to him expressing bewilderment as to how Jarrett could "play from nothing".

Jarrett's 100th solo performance in Japan was captured on video at Suntory Hall, Tokyo, in April 1987, and released the same year as Solo Tribute. This is a set of almost all standard songs. Another video recording, Last Solo, was released in 1987 from a solo concert at Kan-i Hoken Hall in Tokyo in January 1984.

In the late 1990s, Jarrett was diagnosed with chronic fatigue syndrome and was unable to leave his home for long periods of time. During this period, he recorded The Melody at Night, with You, a solo piano effort consisting of jazz standards. The album had originally been a Christmas gift to his second wife, Rose Anne.

By 2000, Jarrett had returned to touring, both solo and with the Standards Trio. Two 2002 solo concerts in Japan, Jarrett's first solo piano concerts following his illness, were released on the 2005 CD Radiance (a complete concert in Osaka and excerpts from one in Tokyo) and the 2006 DVD Tokyo Solo (the entire Tokyo performance). In contrast with previous concerts (which were generally a pair of continuous improvisations 30–40 minutes long), the 2002 concerts consist of a linked series of shorter improvisations (some as short as a minute and a half).

In September 2005, at Carnegie Hall, Jarrett performed his first solo concert in North America in more than ten years, released a year later as a double-CD set, The Carnegie Hall Concert. In late 2008, he performed solo at the Salle Pleyel in Paris and at London's Royal Festival Hall, marking the first time Jarrett played solo in London in 17 years. Recordings of these concerts were released in October 2009 on the album Paris / London: Testament. The 2005 documentary The Art of Improvisation, broadcast on BBC Two on November 12, 2021, concluded with his trio performing a recognizable version of "Basin Street Blues".

=== The Standards Trio ===
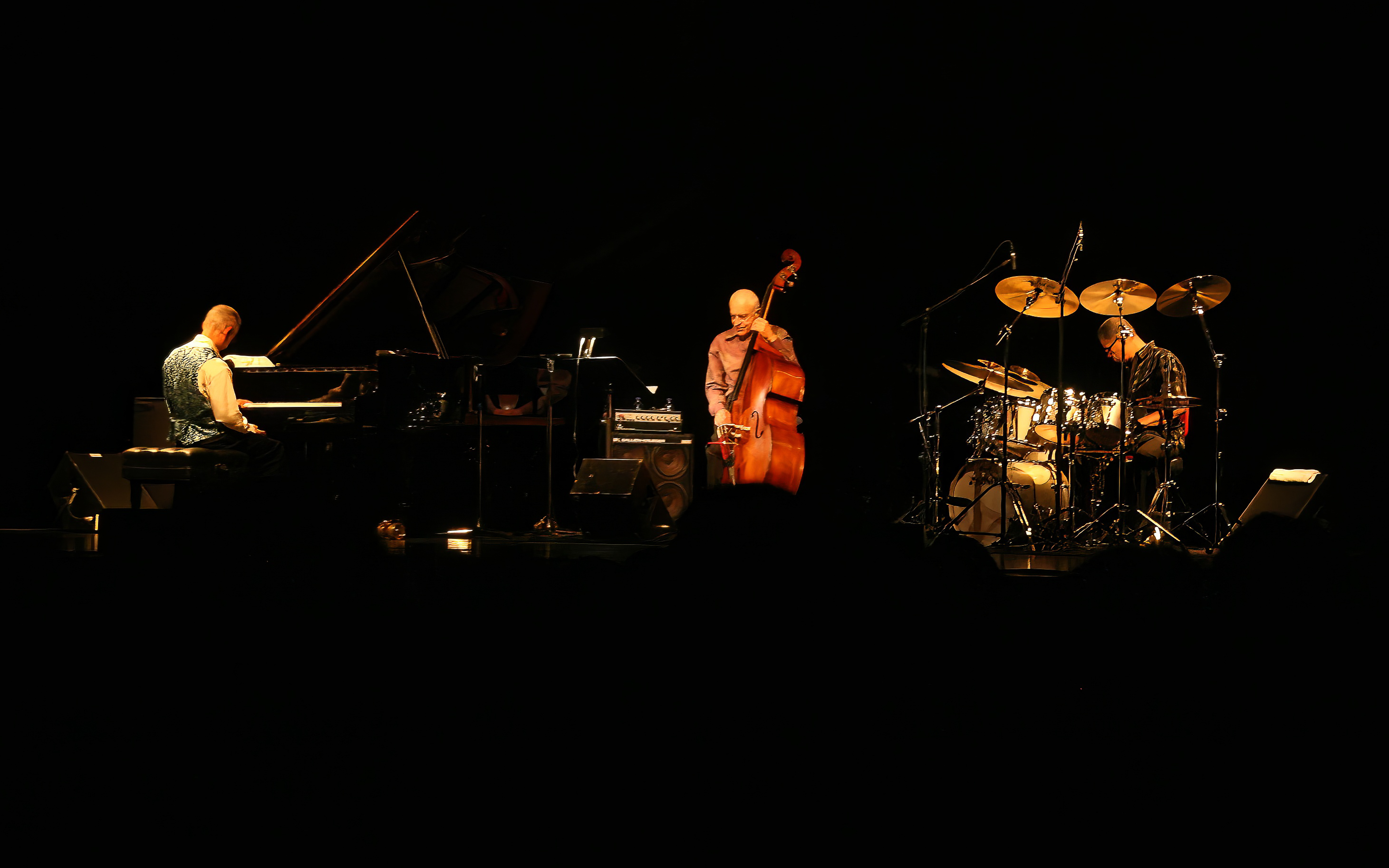
Keith Jarrett Trio, Montreal Concert, 2007

In 1983, at the suggestion of ECM head Manfred Eicher, Jarrett asked bassist Gary Peacock and drummer Jack DeJohnette, with whom he had worked on Peacock's 1977 album Tales of Another, to record an album of jazz standards, simply titled Standards, Vol. 1. Two more albums, Standards, Vol. 2 and Changes, both recorded at the same session, followed soon after. The success of these albums and the group's ensuing tour, which came as traditional acoustic post-bop was enjoying an upswing in the early 1980s, led to this new standards trio becoming one of the premier working groups in jazz, and certainly one of the most enduring, continuing to record and tour for more than 25 years. The Trio went on to record numerous live and studio albums consisting primarily of jazz repertory material.

The Jarrett–Peacock–DeJohnette trio also produced recordings that consist largely of challenging original material, including 1987's Changeless. Several of the standards albums contain an original track or two, some attributed to Jarrett, but most are improvisations on jazz standards. The live recordings Inside Out and Always Let Me Go (released in 2001 and 2002, respectively) marked a renewed interest by the trio in wholly improvised free jazz. By this point in their history, the musical communication among these three men had become nothing short of telepathic, and their group improvisations frequently take on a complexity that sounds almost composed. The standards trio undertook frequent world tours of recital halls (the only venues Jarrett, a notorious stickler for acoustics, will play) and was one of the few truly successful jazz groups to play both straight-ahead (as opposed to smooth) and free jazz.

A related recording, At the Deer Head Inn (1992), is a live album of standards recorded with Paul Motian replacing DeJohnette, at the venue in Delaware Water Gap, Pennsylvania, 40 miles from Jarrett's hometown, where he had his first job as a jazz pianist. It was the first time Jarrett and Motian had played together since the demise of the American quartet sixteen years earlier.

The Standard Trio disbanded in 2014 after more than 30 years. The final concert of Keith Jarrett's trio was on November 30, 2014 at the New Jersey Performing Arts Center, Newark, New Jersey. The last encore was Thelonious Monk's composition "Straight, No Chaser". Peacock died in September 2020.

=== Classical music ===
Since the early 1970s, Jarrett's success as a jazz musician has enabled him to maintain a parallel career as a classical composer and pianist, recording almost exclusively for ECM Records. In the Light, an album made in 1973, consists of short pieces for solo piano, strings, and various chamber ensembles, including a string quartet and a brass quintet, and a piece for cellos and trombones. This collection demonstrates a young composer's affinity for a variety of classical styles.

Luminessence (1974) and Arbour Zena (1975) both combine composed pieces for strings with improvising jazz musicians, including Jan Garbarek and Charlie Haden. The strings here have a moody, contemplative feel that is characteristic of the "ECM sound" of the 1970s and is also particularly well suited to Garbarek's keening saxophone improvisations. From an academic standpoint, these compositions are dismissed by many classical music aficionados as lightweight, but Jarrett appeared to be working more towards a synthesis between composed and improvised music at this time, rather than the production of formal classical works. From this point on, however, his classical work would adhere to more conventional disciplines.

Ritual (1977) is a composed solo piano piece recorded by Dennis Russell Davies that is somewhat reminiscent of Jarrett's own solo piano recordings.

The Celestial Hawk (1980) is a piece for orchestra, percussion, and piano that Jarrett performed and recorded with the Syracuse Symphony under Christopher Keene. This piece is the largest and longest of Jarrett's efforts as a classical composer.

Bridge of Light (1993) is the last recording of classical compositions to appear under Jarrett's name. The album contains three pieces written for a soloist with orchestra, and one for violin and piano. The pieces date from 1984 and 1990.

In 1988, New World Records released the CD Lou Harrison: Piano Concerto and Suite for Violin, Piano and Small Orchestra, featuring Jarrett on piano, with Naoto Otomo conducting the piano concerto with the New Japan Philharmonic. Robert Hughes conducted the Suite for Violin, Piano, and Small Orchestra. In 1992 came the release of Jarrett's performance of Peggy Glanville-Hicks's Etruscan Concerto, with Dennis Russell Davies conducting the Brooklyn Philharmonic. This was released on MusicMasters Classics, with pieces by Lou Harrison and Terry Riley. In 1995, MusicMasters Jazz released a CD on which one track featured Jarrett performing the solo piano part in Lousadzak, a 17-minute piano concerto by American composer Alan Hovhaness. The conductor again was Davies. Most of Jarrett's classical recordings are of older repertoire, but he may have been introduced to this modern work by his one-time manager George Avakian, who was a friend of the composer. Jarrett has also recorded classical works for ECM by composers such as Bach, Handel, Shostakovich, and Arvo Pärt.

In 2004, Jarrett was awarded the Léonie Sonning Music Prize. Usually associated with classical musicians and composers, Miles Davis is the only other jazz performer to have won it.

=== Other works ===
Jarrett has also played harpsichord, clavichord, organ, soprano saxophone, and drums. He often played saxophone and various forms of percussion in the American quartet, though his recordings since the breakup of that group have rarely featured these instruments. On the majority of his recordings in the last 20 years, he has played acoustic piano only. He has spoken with some regret of his decision to give up playing the saxophone, in particular.

On April 15, 1978, Jarrett was the musical guest on Saturday Night Live. The 2001 German film Mostly Martha, whose music consultant was ECM Records founder Manfred Eicher, features Jarrett's "Country" from the European quartet album My Song and "U Dance" from the Standards Trio album Tribute, as well as excerpts from Jarrett's solo concerts.

== Lawsuit against Steely Dan ==
Following the release of the album Gaucho in 1980 by the U.S. rock band Steely Dan, Jarrett sued the band for copyright infringement. Gaucho's title track, credited to Donald Fagen and Walter Becker, bore a resemblance to Jarrett's "Long As You Know You're Living Yours" from Jarrett's 1974 album Belonging. In an interview with Musician magazine, Becker and Fagen were asked about the similarity between the two pieces of music, and Becker told Musician that he loved the Jarrett composition, while Fagen said they had been influenced by it. After their comments were published, Jarrett sued, and Becker and Fagen were legally obliged to add his name to the credits and provide Jarrett with publishing royalties.

== Idiosyncrasies ==
Jarrett frequently emits loud vocalizations, sometimes characterized as moaning, during his playing. Jarrett is also physically active while playing jazz and improvised solo performances, but the vocalizations are generally absent whenever he plays classical repertoire. Jarrett has noted his vocalizations are based on involvement, not content, and are more of an interaction than a reaction. Interviewed in 2015, Jarrett explained the involuntary vocalizations made during his performances: "It's potential limitlessness that I'm feeling at that moment. If you think about it, it's often in a space between phrases, [when I'm thinking,] 'How did I get to this point where I feel so full?' And if you felt full of some sort of emotion you would have to make a sound. So that's actually what it is – with the trio, without the trio, solo. Luckily for me, I don't do it with classical music".

Jarrett is highly intolerant of audience noise, especially during solo improvised performances. He feels extraneous noise affects his inspiration and distracts from the purity of the sound. Cough drops are routinely supplied to Jarrett's audiences in cold weather, and he has been known to stop playing and lead the crowd in a group cough. He has also complained onstage about audience members taking photographs, and has performed in the dark to prevent this.

Jarrett is opposed to electronic instruments and equipment, which he has described as "toys". His liner notes for the 1973 album Solo Concerts: Bremen/Lausanne states, "I am, and have been, carrying on an anti-electric-music crusade of which this is an exhibit for the prosecution. Electricity goes through all of us and is not to be relegated to wires." He has largely eschewed electric or electronic instruments since his time with Miles Davis. However, in October 1972, he played electric piano and piano on Freddie Hubbard's Sky Dive.

== Cultural references ==
A 2025 feature film, Köln 75, tells the story of Jarrett's 1975 concert at the Köln Opera House.

Jarrett was referred to in Season 5, Episode 6, of HBO's The Sopranos in 2004, titled "Sentimental Education"; in the episode, Tony Blundetto mentions "piping in a little Keith Jarrett" among his plans for the massage studio he is building.

== Personal life ==
Jarrett lives in an 18th-century farmhouse in Oxford Township, New Jersey, in rural Warren County, where he used an adjacent barn as a recording and practice studio.

Jarrett was a follower of the teachings of mystic George Gurdjieff for many years, and in 1980 recorded an album of Gurdjieff's compositions, called Sacred Hymns, for ECM. His forebears were Christian Scientists, and though he endorses the core of the faith, he does not follow all its precepts, and also identifies with the Sufi tradition and mystical Islam.

In 1964, Jarrett married Margot Erney, his girlfriend from Emmaus High School with whom he reconnected in Boston. The couple had two sons, Gabriel and Noah, and divorced in 1979. He and his second wife Rose Anne (née Colavito) divorced in 2010 after a 30-year marriage. Jarrett has four younger brothers, two of whom are involved in music. Chris Jarrett is also a pianist and Scott Jarrett is a producer and songwriter. Of the two sons from his first marriage, Noah Jarrett is a bassist and composer, and Gabriel Jarrett is a drummer based in Vermont. Keith Jarrett is currently married to Akiko Jarrett, with whom he shares a birthday.

Jarrett's race has been a source of commentary by media and activists throughout his career, as he has reported being recurrently mistaken as a black person. In a 2000 interview with Terry Gross, Jarrett relates an incident at the Heidelberg Jazz Festival in the Rhine-Neckar region of Germany when he was protested by black musicians for something akin to cultural appropriation. He also tells of a separate moment in his career when black jazz musician Ornette Coleman approached him backstage, and "said something like 'Man, you've got to be Black. You just have to be black.'" Jarrett replied, "I know. I know. I'm working on it."

In a September 11, 2000, interview with Terry Gross, Jarrett revealed that chronic fatigue syndrome required him to radically overhaul his piano to have less breakaway keypress resistance in order for him to keep playing.

Jarrett suffered two strokes in February and May 2018. After the second, he was paralyzed and spent nearly two years in a rehabilitation facility. Although he has regained a limited ability to walk with a cane and can play piano with his right hand, he remains partly paralyzed on his left side and is not expected to perform again. "I don't know what my future is supposed to be. I don't feel right now like I'm a pianist", Jarrett told The New York Times in October 2020.

== Sources ==
- Carr, Ian. Keith Jarrett: The Man and His Music. 1992 ISBN 0-586-09219-6
- Carr, Ian; Fairweather, Digby; Priestley, Brian. The Rough Guide to Jazz. 2003 ISBN 1-84353-256-5
