= Mysteries (album) =

Studio album by Keith Jarrett
- Released: 1976
- Recorded: December 10–12, 1975
- Studios: Generation Sound Studios, New York City (USA)
- Genre: Jazz
- Length: 42:39
- Label: Impulse!
- Producer: Esmond Edwards

Keith Jarrett chronology
| Arbour Zena (1976) | Mysteries (1976) | Shades (1976) |

Keith Jarrett American Quartet chronology
| Death and the Flower (1975) | Mysteries (1976) | Shades (1976) |

Professional ratings
Review scores
| Source | Rating |
|---|---|
| AllMusic | 4/5 stars |
| The Rolling Stone Jazz Record Guide | 3/5 stars |

Mysteries is an album by jazz pianist Keith Jarrett recorded in two sessions in December 1975. Originally released by Impulse! in 1976, it features performances by Jarrett's 'American Quartet' of saxophonist Dewey Redman, bassist Charlie Haden and drummer Paul Motian, along with percussionist Guilherme Franco. These December, 1975 sessions also produced the album Shades.

The album was included in the 1996 four disc Mysteries: The Impulse Years 1975-1976, a box-set which also included Shades and Jarrett's two final albums for Impulse!, Byablue and Bop-Be.

In October 2011 Shades was reissued with Mysteries in a single disc format titled Mysteries / Shades, as part of the Impulse! 2-on-1 series.

== Background: American Quartet's last sessions (Dec. 1975-Oct. 1976) ==
From Neil Tesser's extensive liner notes to the compilation album Mysteries: The Impulse Years 1975-1976:

(..) The first [sessions], in December of 1975, produced the albums Shades and Mysteries, both of them released on LP in 1976. A little less than one year later, the band returned to the studio in its working-quartet configuration -that is, minus percussionist Guilherme Franco- and recorded the tracks that became Byablue and Bop-Be. (Fifteen years later, tracks from both of these LPs were combined onto the CD reissue Silence, so named for the strikingly lovely and much-recorded Charlie Haden composition that had debuted on Bop-Be.) Also, in the spring of 1976 -in between the two sessions that make up this package- the Jarrett Quartet recorded two albums that eventually appeared on ECM Records: The Survivors Suite and Eyes of the Heart.

In scheduling these marathon recording sessions, Jarrett had a quite pragmatic purpose. "I was trying to fulfill my contract with Impulse," he explains: he felt the time had come to move on, and he owed the label four records. The first session proceeded in the same manner as his earlier recordings for the label, and both Shades and Mysteries fit comfortably into the band's legacy. The last session does not. Jarrett says that by the time it rolled around, "I thought, 'Look, the only way to do this is to complete the job I said I'd do without being embarrassed about it.' But I knew there was a limited time because the band was coming to an end; and I also knew there wasn't the right kind of energy in the band to try anything other than programmatic changes."

== Reception ==
The AllMusic review by Richard S. Ginell awarded the album four stars out of five, but at the same time said:

Another in Impulse's extensive series of Keith Jarrett Quintet (sic) recordings, this LP isn't one of the more coherent products of the run. It opens on a faltering note with the hopelessly diffuse and rambling Rotation, and "Everything that Lives Laments" doesn't really get going until a lyrical Vince Guaraldi-like statement from Jarrett sets the track in motion." and that "The Coltrane-ish 15-minute title track has passages of meditative beauty and others of listless torpor. For completists only."

On the positive camp, writing for jazz.com Ted Gioia gave the track "Everything that Lives Laments" a rating of 95/100 and praised it:

Jarrett had recorded this same piece in 1971, but this version is longer and richer. The opening section, played in a free tempo, takes on a funereal stateliness. The ensemble plays with great control and sensitivity, but the quality of sound Haden extracts from his bass deserves special mention. Then, shortly after the two-minute mark, the combo settles into a lilting groove over a quirky six-bar chord pattern, where what sounds like the start of the turnaround (because the listener is expecting an eight bar structure) is actually the return to the top of the form — a clever device that is very effectively employed here... this recording testifies that his American combo ranked among the finest jazz groups of the mid-1970s.

== Track listing ==
All compositions by Keith Jarrett.

1. "Rotation" – 11:03
2. "Everything that Lives Laments" – 10:04
3. "Flame" – 6:10
4. "Mysteries" – 15:22

== Personnel ==
- Keith Jarrett – piano, Pakistani flute, wood drums, percussion
- Dewey Redman – tenor saxophone, maracas, tambourine, Chinese musette, percussion
- Charlie Haden – bass
- Paul Motian – drums, percussion
- Guilherme Franco – percussion

Production

- Esmond Edwards – producer
- Tony May – recording engineer
- Tom Wilkes – art director
- Kendun Recorders – mixing and mastering
- Keith Jarrett – cover photograph
