= Inside Out (Keith Jarrett album) =

Live album by Keith Jarrett
- Released: October 2001
- Recorded: July 26 & 28, 2000
- Venue: Royal Festival Hall; Southbank Centre; London, England
- Genre: Jazz
- Length: 78:08
- Label: ECM; ECM 1780
- Producer: Manfred Eicher

Keith Jarrett chronology
Whisper Not (2000)	Inside Out (2001)	Always Let Me Go (2002)

Jarrett / Peacock / DeJohnette chronology
Whisper Not (2000)	Inside Out (2001)	Always Let Me Go (2002)

Inside Out is a live album by American jazz pianist Keith Jarrett, recorded at the Royal Festival Hall in London on July 26 & 28, 2000 and released on ECM October the following year. The trio—Jarrett's "Standards Trio"—features rhythm section Gary Peacock and Jack DeJohnette. Along with Changes (1983) and Changeless (1987), this was the trio's third album to feature mainly original improvised material.

== Background ==
In the album liner notes, Jarrett wrote that, during a tour of Europe, he suggested to Peacock and DeJohnette that they consider performing without any prearranged material, noting that the three of them had been involved in "free" improvisation since the 1960s. He commented: "Where's the form? Don't ask. Don't think. Don't anticipate. Just participate. It's all there somewhere inside. And then suddenly it forms itself... We need to be even more in tune with each other to play this way, without material; and even more attentive. Every possibility is available if you take away the tunes, but only some are valid under the circumstances. It is only our sensitivity to the flux that determines whether the music succeeds or fails."

== Reception ==
Professional ratings
Review scores
Source	Rating
DownBeat	5/5 stars
The Penguin Guide to Jazz	3/4 stars
AllMusic	4.5/5 stars

In a contemporary review for DownBeat, James Hale remarked, "After 18 years together and 13 recordings, several of them multiple-disc sets, it might seem difficult to pinpoint a career highlight, but for Keith Jarrett’s Standards Trio, this could be it... Inside Out captures the trio departing from its regular format to improvise freely without the framework of the American popular songbook or bop standards for all but seven minutes. The result is spell-inducing... If last year’s bop-drenched live set Whisper Not signaled that Jarrett was back at full force, Inside Out gives notice that the band has stepped it up another notch. At this point in its existence, the name the Standards Trio has ceased to signify the band’s repertoire; rather, it stands for the level they set for other improvisers."

Writing for All About Jazz, Glenn Astarita commented, "With Inside Out, the artists' seemingly realign their musical know-how while extending their years of uniformity to the next logical degree of amplitude or state of being. Simply put, the Trio reminds us that improvisation in general does not require a total sense of randomness without reason; as we listen to the musicians create a masterpiece akin to an artist applying strokes to a canvas. The underlying focal point rings of substance and beauty as this production also signifies entertainment of the highest order. Strongly recommended. (A top pick for 2001)"

A separate review for All About Jazz states, "It has long been obvious to this observer that the level of interaction among these three players borders on inhuman intuition; and that's the key to making free improvisation work. Inside Out takes Jarrett back to his early American Quartet days, with a welcome degree of unpredictability that makes every moment of these improvisations more exciting. This is a landmark work which bears careful inspection and repeated listening... Each of these players has a wealth of experience playing "out." In fact, it's a reunion of sorts for them to approach the music from such a fresh and dynamic angle... My cheers go to the adventurism of the trio's new approach."

The AllMusic review by Thom Jurek awarded the album 4½ stars, stating, "Here are Jarrett, Peacock, and DeJohnette as they haven't been heard from in years, starting from silence, digging deep into the history of jazz, blues and even R&B to invent spontaneously a musical language that is trio-specific, communicative on the deepest levels of nuance, sonances, and spirit."

In an article for ECM blog Between Sound and Space, Tyran Grillo wrote, "What in others’ hands would have been a risky venture turns into a balanced, intuitive record from these most capable sound-smiths... Inside Out is unafraid to live up to its title. Although on the surface it seems more abstract than might a typical standards outing, you may just find yourself lulled by its inherent, not to mention accessible, profundity. Were the album a genetic experiment, each track would be a kink in the DNA helix that makes its bearer unique."

== Track listing ==
All compositions by Keith Jarrett except as indicated

1. "From the Body" – 23:13
2. "Inside Out" – 21:13
3. "341 Free Fade" – 18:50
4. "Riot" – 7:23
5. "When I Fall in Love" (Edward Heyman, Victor Young) – 7:25

== Personnel ==
- Keith Jarrett – piano
- Gary Peacock – bass
- Jack DeJohnette – drums

=== Technical personnel ===
- Manfred Eicher – producer
- Martin Pearson – engineer
- Sascha Kleis – cover design
- Roberto Masotti – photography
- Keith Jarrett – liner notes
