= Eyes of the Heart (album) =

Live album by Keith Jarrett
- Released: 25 May 1979
- Recorded: May 1976
- Venue: Theater am Kornmarkt; Bregenz, Austria
- Genre: Post-bop
- Length: 50:56
- Label: ECM 1150
- Producer: Manfred Eicher

Keith Jarrett chronology
Bop-Be (1978)	Eyes of the Heart (1979)	Nude Ants (1980)

Keith Jarrett American Quartet chronology
Bop-Be (1978)	Eyes of the Heart (1979)	Hamburg '72 (2014)

Professional ratings
Review scores
Source	Rating
Allmusic	3/5 stars
The Penguin Guide to Jazz	1.5/4 stars
The Rolling Stone Jazz Record Guide	3/5 stars

Eyes of The Heart is a live album by American pianist Keith Jarrett recorded at the Theater am Kornmarkt in Bregenz, Austria in May 1976 and released on ECM in 1979—the last release by Jarrett's "American Quartet", featuring saxophonist Dewey Redman and rhythm section Charlie Haden and Paul Motian.

== Background ==
The studio album The Survivors' Suite had been recorded one month earlier.

Although recorded the same year before Byablue (released in 1977) and Bop-Be (released in 1978), Eyes of The Heart was the last album released to feature Jarrett's American quartet.

== Original notes ==
As part of the public farewell and disbanding of Jarrett's "American Quartet" the CD and vinyl issues contained a few notes addressed to its members:

Music is at its best when it carries you along at a level deeper than the music itself and forces you to live in its spaces as well as its notes.
Improvisation is at its best when everyone involved in the music is aware of an intent greater than his own; therefore more his own. Neither of these are common occurrences.
I wish to dedicate this recording to Charlie Haden, Dewey Redman and Paul Motian, all of whom shared the most valuable intimacy with me during the making of this music.
It is not easy.
It is not difficult.
It is.

== Reception ==
Writing for AllMusic, Scott Yanow called the album "intriguing", and wrote: "Every recording by this particular group (arguably Jarrett's best working ensemble) is well worth hearing, for they had their own sound and the ability to play both 'inside' and 'outside' simultaneously, and they were continually full of surprises." In an article for Between Sound and Space, Tyran Grillo commented: "Just when I think I've encountered the extent of Jarrett's immeasurable talents, he surprises me with an album like this. It's always a pleasure to hear his peripheral instrumental work, for his talents at the keyboard transfer effortlessly to reed by way of our grateful hearts. Perhaps the title is more than just a metaphor."

== Track listing ==
All music composed by Keith Jarrett.

1. "Eyes of the Heart (Part One)" – 17:11
2. "Eyes of the Heart (Part Two)" – 15:43
3. "Encore (a-b-c)" – 18:03

== Personnel ==
=== American Quartet ===
- Keith Jarrett – piano, soprano saxophone, osi drums, tambourine
- Dewey Redman – tenor saxophone, tambourine, maracas
- Charlie Haden – bass
- Paul Motian – drums, percussion

=== Production ===
- Manfred Eicher – producer
- Martin Wieland – recording engineer
- Barbara Wojirsch – design
- Keith Jarrett - photography
