= Whisper Not =

Whisper Not may refer to:

- "Whisper Not" (song), written by Benny Golson in 1956
- Whisper Not (Ella Fitzgerald album), 1966
- Whisper Not (Keith Jarrett album), 1999
