= La Fenice (album) =

Live album by Keith Jarrett
- Released: October 2018
- Recorded: July 19, 2006
- Venue: La Fenice; Venice, Italy
- Genre: Jazz
- Length: 1:37:43
- Label: ECM 2601
- Producer: Veneto Jazz / Giuseppe Mormile, Keith Jarrett

Keith Jarrett chronology
After the Fall (2018)	La Fenice (2018)	Munich 2016 (2019)

Keith Jarrett solo piano chronology
A Multitude of Angels (2016)	La Fenice (2018)	Budapest Concert (2020)

La Fenice is a live solo album by Keith Jarrett recorded at the Teatro La Fenice in Italy on July 19, 2006 and released on ECM 12 years later, in October 2018. According to ECM, its release was "timely" as the 62nd International Festival of Contemporary Music of the 'Biennale di Venezia' honoured Keith Jarrett with its Golden Lion for Lifetime Achievement.

== Reception ==
Professional ratings
Review scores
Source	Rating
Allmusic	4/5 stars
The Observer	5/5 stars
The Times	3/5 stars
Financial Times	4/5 stars
All About Jazz	3.5/5 stars
All About Jazz	3/5 stars

AllMusic awarded the album 4 stars and the review by Thom Jurek stated "The music found here is rangy and adventurous, commencing with the knotty, nearly 18-minute opening section that is one of the better showcases of the pianist's inventive delivery. Elements of classical technique and invention meet dissonant mechanics in a dazzling technical display.... La Fenice may be yet another Jarrett solo concert, but when he chases after it with this kind of energy, humor, passion, and emotion, an hour-and-a-half passes in what seems like a moment."

Dave Gelly of The Observer commented that, "Jarrett has always favoured exhaustive documentation, but the intensity, variety, and astonishing technical command of these performances might well persuade devoted fans and intrigued improv enthusiasts alike of his view that these were landmark moments."

In the Financial Times, Mike Hobart wrote "As on other solo recordings, this Jarrett performance contrasts modernist dissonance with delicate musings and references to folk music, the standard repertoire and the blues. Here, though, he builds his architectural structures on mere fragments of sound or turns slight themes into music of substance. The intense appreciation that fades out at the end of the set is merited ... The album doesn’t offer new insights into the pianist’s aesthetic, but each Jarrett performance is unique, and with the pianist near his fluent best it always engrosses."

On All About Jazz, Karl Ackermann observed "As the greatest pianist of our time, the bar is inconsiderately high for Jarrett's work. One of a kind, he can't rationally be compared to his contemporaries, so with each addition to the catalog his output is judged relative to his own history. In that vein La Fenice falls short of later ECM albums ... The spontaneous improvisations are interesting but a bit sterile; the ballads are beautifully played as always, but predictable. At the end of the day, La Fenice is neither essential Jarrett nor an unworthy addition to his resume. It simply lacks the impact of much of his solo work." On the same site Mike Jurkovic said "Emotionally captivating as all his recordings ultimately are, La Fenice is comprised mostly of the eight part suite that dominates the recording.... But even with all its graceful moments of sheer creative joy and wonder, La Fenice isn't La Scala or any of the grander works that define and watermark Jarrett's sole and unique place in the art of solo piano.... As always, Jarrett crafts resplendent passages, but here they are too few and far between to allow La Fenice to stand with his many solo piano masterworks."

== Track listing ==
All compositions by Keith Jarrett except where noted

Disc one
No.	Title	Length
1.	"Part I"	17:44
2.	"Part II"	3:26
3.	"Part III"	9:53
4.	"Part IV"	7:22
5.	"Part V"	6:41
Total length:		45:06

Disc two
No.	Title	Writer(s)	Length
1.	"Part VI"		13:32
2.	"The Sun Whose Rays"	Arthur Sullivan, W. S. Gilbert	4:26
3.	"Part VII"		5:30
4.	"Part VIII"		9:15
5.	"My Wild Irish Rose"	Traditional	8:36
6.	"Stella by Starlight"	Victor Young; Ned Washington	6:33
7.	"Blossom"		9:11
Total length:			52:03 1:37:43

== Personnel ==
- Keith Jarrett – piano

=== Production ===
- Keith Jarrett – producer
- Manfred Eicher – executive producer, mastering
- Martin Pearson – recording engineer
- Christoph Stickel – mastering
- Sascha Kleis – design
- Juan Hitters – cover photograph
- Roberto Masotti – liner photographs
