= Always Let Me Go =

Live album by Keith Jarrett / Gary Peacock / Jack DeJohnette
- Released: October 2002
- Recorded: April 2001
- Venue: Orchard Hall and Bunka Kaikan, Tokyo (Japan)
- Genre: Jazz
- Length: 2:17:25
- Label: ECM; ECM 1800/01
- Producer: Manfred Eicher, Keith Jarrett

Keith Jarrett chronology
Inside Out (2001)	Always Let Me Go (2002)	Up for It (2003)

Jarrett / Peacock / DeJohnette chronology
Inside Out (2001)	Always Let Me Go (2002)	Up for It (2003)

Always Let Me Go: Live in Tokyo is a live double album by American jazz pianist Keith Jarrett, recorded at the Bunkamura Orchard Hall and Tokyo Bunka Kaikan in Japan in April 2001 and released on ECM October the following year. The trio—Jarrett's "Standards Trio"—features rhythm section Gary Peacock and Jack DeJohnette.

It is the fourth album to feature mainly original improvised material by the trio, following Changes (1983), Changeless (1987), and Inside Out (2000).

== Reception ==
Professional ratings
Review scores
Source	Rating
AllMusic	4.5/5 stars
DownBeat	5/5 stars
The Penguin Guide to Jazz	3.5/4 stars

The AllMusic review by Glenn Swan awarded the album 4½ stars and states, "After 20 years of working together, they trust each other (and the audience) enough to deliver over two hours of unscripted music... it adds a rewarding layer of understanding and appreciation, as few musicians can deliver such diamonds with so little structure in place. Song for song, the symbiosis is a marvel to behold—and the audience knows it. These are gods at play, and the lightning bolts they toss around are awe-inspiring."

In a review for DownBeat, Thomas Conrad wrote, "Always Let Me Go sustains a heightened sense of imaginative focus through its sudden shifts, peaks and valleys, the exquisitely realized songs within songs that the trio comes upon... and the dramatic swings of its dynamic scope. In its 20th year, this trio keeps growing in its ability to challenge the creativity of its listeners."

The authors of The Penguin Guide to Jazz commented, "As a document of Jarrett's almost 150th performance in Japan, it's impeccable."

== Track listing ==
All tracks are written by Keith Jarrett, except as noted.

Disc one
No.	Title	Writer(s)	Length
1.	"Hearts in Space"		32:12
2.	"The River"		3:34
3.	"Tributaries"	DeJohnette; Jarrett; Peacock	16:18
4.	"Paradox"		9:01

Disc two
No.	Title	Writer(s)	Length
1.	"Waves"		34:25
2.	"Facing East"	DeJohnette; Jarrett; Peacock	14:04
3.	"Tsunami"		14:51
4.	"Relay"		13:00

== Personnel ==
- Keith Jarrett – piano
- Gary Peacock – double bass
- Jack DeJohnette – drums

=== Technical personnel ===
- Keith Jarrett, Manfred Eicher – producer
- Yoshihiro Suzuki – recording engineer
- Dieter Rehm – design, cover photography
- Fumiaki Fujimoto – liner photography
