= La Scala (album) =

Live album by Keith Jarrett
- Released: May 1997
- Recorded: February 13, 1995
- Venue: La Scala; Milan, Italy
- Length: 1:18:38
- Label: ECM; ECM 1640
- Producer: Manfred Eicher

Keith Jarrett chronology
Mysteries: The Impulse Years 1975-1976 (1996)	La Scala (1997)	The Impulse Years: 1973-1974 (1997)

Keith Jarrett solo piano chronology
Vienna Concert (1992)	La Scala (1997)	The Melody at Night, with You (1999)

La Scala is a live solo album by American jazz pianist Keith Jarrett recorded at La Scala in Milan on February 13, 1995 and released on ECM in May 1997.

== Reception ==
Professional ratings
Review scores
Source	Rating
AllMusic	4/5 stars
The Penguin Guide to Jazz	3.5/4 stars
Uncut	3/5 stars

The AllMusic review by Scott Yanow awarded the album 4 stars, stating, "The music overall develops slowly but always holds one's interest, reinforcing one's viewpoint of Keith Jarrett as one of the top pianists of the 1980s and '90s."

The authors of The Penguin Guide to Jazz wrote, "Jarrett's improvisations are as long and as densely textured as ever, but there is a modesty and philosophical calm about the music which seems new. The second part of 'La Scala' ... has outbreaks of quiet violence, but nothing that doesn't have its own resolution. The instrument is immaculate, warm and full-voiced."

== Track listing ==
All music by Keith Jarrett, except as noted.

1. "La Scala, Part 1" – 44:54
2. "La Scala, Part 2" – 27:42
3. "Over the Rainbow" (Harold Arlen, E.Y. "Yip" Harburg) – 6:01

== Personnel ==
- Keith Jarrett – piano

=== Technical personnel ===
- Manfred Eicher – executive producer, remixing engineer
- Jan Erik Kongshaug – remixing engineer
- Michael Hofstetter – cover design
- Mayo Bucher – cover graphic
- Judith Joy Ross – liner photography
