= Mysteries: The Impulse Years 1975–1976 =

Compilation album by Keith Jarrett
- Released: 1996
- Recorded: December 10–12, 1975 (discs 1 and 2); October 14–16, 1976 (discs 3 and 4)
- Studio: Generation Sound, New York City
- Genre: Jazz
- Label: Impulse! IMPD-189
- Producer: Ed Michel

Keith Jarrett chronology
Keith Jarrett at the Blue Note (1995)	Mysteries: The Impulse Years 1975–1976 (1996)	La Scala (1997)

Mysteries: The Impulse Years 1975–1976 is a four CD collection of the Keith Jarrett albums Mysteries, Shades, Byablue and Bop-Be. The set was released in 1996 by Impulse! Records and in 1997 by Aris / MCA. Previously unreleased alternate takes are present on each disc.

The music was performed by Jarrett and his affectionately-titled 'American Quartet', composed of Charlie Haden, Paul Motian, and Dewey Redman. Guilherme Franco contributed additional percussion to Mysteries and Shades.

In 1997, a 5-CD box set called The Impulse Years: 1973-1974 was also released, composed of Fort Yawuh, Treasure Island, Death and The Flower, and Back Hand.

Aside from their appearances in this box set, Shades and Bop-Be have only ever been released individually on CD in Japan. Shades was later reissued internationally (with Mysteries, as a single disc set) as part of the Impulse! 2-on-1 series in 2011.

== Reception ==
Professional ratings
Review scores
Source	Rating
AllMusic	3/5 stars
The Penguin Guide to Jazz	3.5/4 stars

Scott Yanow, writing for AllMusic, awarded the album 3 stars, calling the band "the finest group that... Jarrett ever led", and commenting: "Jarrett's inside/outside music... both held onto the tradition of chordal improvisation and were reminiscent of Ornette Coleman's earlier acoustic groups. There are a few brief exotic sound explorations, but most of the music... extends the swinging tradition into complex areas that have yet to be fully explored by others. Continually fascinating music."

The authors of The Penguin Guide to Jazz awarded the album 3½ stars, commenting: "the big plus on these transfers is being able to hear Haden in full voice and in a sensible stereo position, unexpectedly foregrounded and bridging saxophone and piano with great dexterity."

A reviewer for BBC Music Magazine called the box set "magnificent", and wrote: "Jarrett and his group are such consummate improvisers that the alternative takes are different from, but hardly ever inferior to, the master tracks. All of the compositions are by Jarrett, and the fluidity of his writing and playing is a wonder to behold."

== Track listing - Disc 1: Shades ==
1. "Shades of Jazz"
2. "Southern Smiles"
3. "Rose Petals"
4. "Diatribe"
5. "Shades of Jazz" alternate take
6. "Southern Smiles" alt. take
7. "Rose Petals" alt. take
8. "Rose Petals" alt. take

All compositions credited to Keith Jarrett

== Track listing - Disc 2: Mysteries ==
1. "Rotation"
2. "Everything That Lives Laments"
3. "Flame"
4. "Mysteries"
5. "Everything That Lives Laments" alternate take
6. "Playaround" previously unreleased

All compositions credited to Keith Jarrett

== Track listing - Disc 3: Byablue ==
1. "Byablue" (Paul Motian)
2. "Konya" (Keith Jarrett)
3. "Rainbow" (Margot Jarrett)
4. "Trieste" (Motian)
5. "Fantasm" (Motian)
6. "Fantasm" (Motian) alternate take
7. "Yahllah" (Motian)
8. "Byablue" piano solo (Motian)
9. "Trieste" (Motian) alt. take
10. "Rainbow" (Margot Jarrett) alt. take

== Track listing - Disc 4: Bop-Be ==
1. "Mushi Mushi" (Dewey Redman)
2. "Silence" (Charlie Haden)
3. "Bop-Be" (Keith Jarrett)
4. "Pyramids Moving" (Redman)
5. "Gotta Get Some Sleep" (Redman)
6. "Blackberry Winter" (Loonis McGlohon; Alec Wilder)
7. "Pocketful of Cherry" (Haden)
8. "Gotta Get Some Sleep" (Redman) alternate take
9. "Blackberry Winter" (McGlohon; Wilder) alternate take
