= Creation (Keith Jarrett album) =

Live album by Keith Jarrett
- Released: May 2015
- Recorded: April, May, June and July, 2014
- Venue: Toronto, Tokyo, Paris, Rome
- Length: 1:12:30
- Label: ECM [ECM 2450]
- Producer: Keith Jarrett

Keith Jarrett chronology
Hamburg '72 (2014)	Creation (2015)	A Multitude of Angels (2016)

Keith Jarrett solo piano chronology
Rio (2011)	Creation (2015)	A Multitude of Angels (2016)

Professional ratings
Review scores
Source	Rating
AllMusic	4/5 stars
The Daily Telegraph	2/5 stars
The Guardian	4/5 stars
The Irish Times	4/5 stars

Creation is a solo piano album by American pianist and composer Keith Jarrett containing music selected and sequenced (by himself) from improvised solo concerts that took place in Japan, Canada, and Europe between April–July 2014. It was released by ECM Records in May 2015.

== 2014 solo concerts ==
According to www.keithjarrett.org, Jarrett played a total of 10 solo piano concerts in 2014. Creation consists of different tracks recorded in 6 of those concerts.

- February 5 - Isaac Stern Auditorium, Carnegie Hall, New York City (USA)
- April 30 - Orchard Hall, Bunkamura, Tokyo (Japan) [Creation Part #9]
- May 3 - Festival Hall, Osaka (Japan)
- May 6 - Orchard Hall, Bunkamura, Tokyo (Japan) [Creation Part #6]
- May 9 - Kioi Hall, Tokyo (Japan) [Creation Parts #2, #5]
- June 25 - Roy Thomson Hall, Toronto (Canada) [Creation Part #1]
- June 28 - Maison Symphonique, Montréal (Canada)
- July 4 - Salle Playel, Paris (France) [Creation Part #3]
- July 8 - La Fenice, Venice (Italy)
- July 11 - Auditorium Parco della Musica, Rome (Italy) [Creation Parts #4, #7-8 ]

== Reception ==
Cormack Larkin of The Irish Times noted: "Even so, it's four years since his last solo release, the joyously exuberant Rio. This latest is more subdued, a selection of sometimes brooding but occasionally sublime ruminations, culled from live performances around the world in 2014, amounting to an unintended suite many Romantic-era classical composers would have been happy to have written."

John Fordham of The Guardian wrote: "In its pensive melodies and post-Romantic chord voicings, Creation is a very different proposition to the jubilant Rio. It comprises selections from six different 2014 concert performances in four cities, reordered to make a nine-part suite that sounds like a free-flowing single work. Some sections unfold as treble ripples turning to ballad-like songs, while glimpses of gospel chord-changes surface and then evaporate, and rolling, low-register ostinatos gently modulate. It's dark, and sometimes melancholy, but as usual with Jarrett, full of improvised motifs that suggest long-forgotten songs."

Jazz critic Ivan Hewett of The Telegraph focuses his analysis on Jarrett's apparent declining career, the lack of blues, jazz changes and the absence of virtuoso finger-work:

"On Creation, the grandstanding is as grand as ever, but the musical range is sadly shrivelled. Gone are the blues numbers and clever way with chord changes in standards (..) every now and then Jarrett will make a brilliant harmonic move that opens up wide vistas. But mostly these arresting openings trail off into empty note-spinning, without even the virtuoso finger-work to give it a veneer of excitement."
"In the past, one could always forgive the stretches of empty grandstanding, the spinning out of not-very-interesting ideas to inordinate length, the tuneless singing, the frequent pauses to harangue the audience about their coughing. Between these annoyances came truly wonderful things, especially when Jarrett had the stimulus of his regular trio playing alongside him."

== Track listing ==
1. Part I – Live at Roy Thomson Hall, Toronto - 8:17
2. Part II – Live at Kioi Hall, Tokyo - 7:40
3. Part III – Live at Salle Pleyel, Paris - 6:59
4. Part IV – Live at Auditorium Parco della Musica, Rome - 7:33
5. Part V – Live at Kioi Hall, Tokyo - 7:13
6. Part VI – Live at Orchard Hall, Tokyo - 9:25
7. Part VII – Live at Auditorium Parco della Musica, Rome - 8:17
8. Part VIII – Live at Auditorium Parco della Musica, Rome - 8:36
9. Part IX – Live at Orchard Hall, Tokyo - 8:30

Music by Keith Jarrett

== Personnel ==
- Keith Jarrett - piano

Production

- Keith Jarrett - producer
- Manfred Eicher - executive producer, engineer (mastering)
- Martin Pearson - engineer (recording)
- Ryu Kawashima - engineer (recording in Tokyo)
- Christoph Stickel - engineer (mastering)
- Sascha Kleis - design
- Eberhard Ross - cover painting

== Charts ==
Chart (2014)	Peak position
Austrian Albums (Ö3 Austria)	50
Belgian Albums (Ultratop Flanders)	75
Belgian Albums (Ultratop Wallonia)	93
French Albums (SNEP)	63
German Albums (Offizielle Top 100)	26
Italian Albums (FIMI)	33
Swiss Albums (Schweizer Hitparade)	39
