= Staircase (album) =

Studio album by Keith Jarrett
- Released: 1977
- Recorded: May 1976
- Studio: Davout Studios; Paris, France
- Genre: Jazz
- Length: 74:27
- Label: ECM; ECM 1090/91 ST
- Producer: Manfred Eicher

Keith Jarrett chronology
The Survivors' Suite (1977)	Staircase (1977)	Byablue (1977)

Keith Jarrett solo piano chronology
The Köln Concert (1975)	Staircase (1977)	Sun Bear Concerts (1978)

Staircase is a solo double album by American jazz pianist Keith Jarrett recorded in May 1976 and released on ECM the following year.

== Background ==
Jarrett and producer Manfred Eicher had arrived at Studio Davout in Paris to record a soundtrack to Michèle Rosier's film Mon cœur est rouge (French: "My Heart Is Red"). Finishing early with several hours of studio time left and impressed by the quality of the studio's piano, they spontaneously decided to record this album.

== Reception ==
Professional ratings
Review scores
Source	Rating
AllMusic	4/5 stars
The Penguin Guide to Jazz	2.5/4 stars
The Rolling Stone Jazz Record Guide	5/5 stars

The AllMusic review by Richard S. Ginell states, "One can always admire Jarrett's lovely tone and flexible touch, yet when he gets stuck for ideas, the repetitions finally begin to grate. Maybe he really needs the stimulus of a live audience in order to get the creative and rhythmic juices flowing when flying solo."

Jarrett biographer Wolfgang Sandner called the album "an impressive study in sound" and an "unbelievable synthesis of sonic art", and commented: "There is no other Keith Jarrett recording that comes so close to achieving the pianistic ideal of lyricism as does this astounding album."

== Track listing ==
All tracks are written by Keith Jarrett.

Side I: Staircase
No.	Title	Length
1.	"Part 1"	6:57
2.	"Part 2"	7:58
3.	"Part 3"	1:25

Side II: Hourglass
No.	Title	Length
1.	"Part 1"	4:42
2.	"Part 2"	14:03

Side III: Sundial
No.	Title	Length
1.	"Part 1"	8:57
2.	"Part 2"	4:55
3.	"Part 3"	6:27

Side IV: Sand
No.	Title	Length
1.	"Part 1"	6:54
2.	"Part 2"	8:48
3.	"Part 3"	3:21

== Personnel ==
=== Musician ===
- Keith Jarrett – piano

=== Technical personnel ===
- Manfred Eicher – producer
- Roger Roche – recording engineer
- Barbara Wojirsch – layout, cover design
- Franco Fontana – photography
