= Spirits (Keith Jarrett album) =

Studio album by Keith Jarrett
- Released: September 1986
- Recorded: May–June 1985
- Studios: Cavelight Studios; New Jersey
- Genre: Jazz
- Length: 1:50:58
- Label: ECM 1333/34
- Producer: Manfred Eicher

Keith Jarrett chronology
Standards Live (1986)	Spirits (1986)	Book of Ways (1987)

Spirits is a solo double album by Keith Jarrett recorded at his home studio over May–June 1985 in New Jersey and released on ECM September the following year, featuring Jarrett performing on various instruments he had on hand: two flutes, three sets of tablas, a shaker, six recorders, his voice, a soprano saxophone, a piano, a guitar, a glockenspiel, a tambourine, a cowbell, and a bağlama.

The album is dedicated to Jarrett's wife, Rose Ann Colavito.

== Background ==
According to Edward Strickland in his book "American Composers: Dialogues on Contemporary Music"

After abandoning the solo concerts in early 1984, Jarrett began releasing albums of jazz standards with Gary Peacock and Jack DeJohnette, with whom he continues touring and recording. For a year and a half he devoted himself primarily to performing classical recitals and concerts. In mid-1985, frustrated to the point of numbness, he canceled further engagements and recorded what became ''Spirits'' alone in his studio in a reconverted barn beside his home. He used only the instruments on hand and two cassette recorders, on which he overdubbed himself playing a family Moeck recorders, tablas (the Indian drums that are his favorite instrument), soprano saxophone, other winds, plucked strings, percussion, and a bare minimum of piano. Jarrett described the unpremeditated primitivism of ''Spirits'' as intuitive rather than a calculated reaction to the speciousness of contemporary musical and other technology. Its twenty-six sections range from under two to eight minutes, some pristine in their lyricism, others pulsing with rhythm or unsettling in their desolation. Jarrett considers ''Spirits'' his most important composition to date, and subsequent conversations and correspondence, now five years after its inception, confirm it as a watershed work in its influence on both his interpretive and his compositional concerns."

== Reception ==
Professional ratings
Review scores
Source	Rating
AllMusic	3/5 stars
The Penguin Guide to Jazz	2.5/4 stars

Among mixed enthusiasm after such a different output in Jarrett's previous production, the Rough Guide to Jazz states, "The process of creating this home-recorded 'ethnic' music helped Jarrett weather his crisis and get back to full music-making. The music on this two-disc set has its own direct depth and beauty—the glorious rhythm and Pakistani flute on 'Spirits 21' for example, or the liturgical vocal drones and haunting soprano saxophone on 'Spirits 17'—but also stands as a record of a unique revelatory experience."

NPR's Tom Moon called the album "an experimental (and unfairly disregarded) transfixing two-disc vision quest recorded between May and July 1985 by Jarrett alone in a studio in New Jersey".

In a three-star review for AllMusic, jazz critic Ron Wynn called the album, "More a technical showcase than a musically worthy enterprise."

In 2002 an All About Jazz editorial review of Rarum: Selected Recordings of Keith Jarrett (containing five tracks from Spirits), credited to "various All About Jazz staff members" called Spirits "a totally flat overdubbed solo record from '85, stand as a terrible exception to Jarrett's usual freshness and verve."

== Track listing ==
All compositions by Keith Jarrett

Spirits Vol. 1:

1. "Spirits 1" - 5:07
2. "Spirits 2" - 1:37
3. "Spirits 3" - 8:04
4. "Spirits 4" - 5:56
5. "Spirits 5" - 4:10
6. "Spirits 6" - 1:58
7. "Spirits 7" - 7:09
8. "Spirits 8" - 4:52
9. "Spirits 9" - 5:12
10. "Spirits 10" - 3:27
11. "Spirits 11" - 2:36
12. "Spirits 12" - 4:47

Spirits Vol. 2:

1. "Spirits 13" - 5:09
2. "Spirits 14" - 3:06
3. "Spirits 15" - 2:26
4. "Spirits 16" - 2:10
5. "Spirits 17" - 2:57
6. "Spirits 18" - 6:20
7. "Spirits 19" - 4:50
8. "Spirits 20" - 5:13
9. "Spirits 21" - 4:21
10. "Spirits 22" - 3:08
11. "Spirits 23" - 4:04
12. "Spirits 24" - 3:02
13. "Spirits 25" - 2:18
14. "Spirits 26" - 6:12

== Personnel ==
- Keith Jarrett – flutes: Pakistani; alto Vermont folk, 3 sets of tablas, South American shaker, Moeck recorders: sopranino (ebony); soprano (ebony); alto (ebony); tenor (ebony); bass (white maple); great bass (white maple), voice, King straight soprano saxophone, Steinway piano, Orozco guitar, miniature glockenspiel, small tambourine, African double cowbell, Saz bağlama

== Original liner notes ==
In the original liner notes, Keith Jarrett states:

These tapes were made in my studio in New Jersey without an engineer and without anything but cassette recorders. They were recorded during the month of May–June 1985 with no purpose other than allowing them to happen; filling a need. The music was not recorded with the intention of release to the public. During the month or so that the project lasted, I would go into the studio every day and "make" something. There was no "studio" feeling at all because I was alone with the instruments "at home". These instruments have lived with me for quite some time and there is a Pakistani flute (originally a nose flute) that I bought in Sweden in the '60s that plays a central role in these pieces. There also was no program to follow and, by far, most of the pieces were not written at all. Some of them that sound written were, also, not written. Spontaneity is what I worked with. Some flute and drum tracks were recorded "flute-first", others "drums-first". There were no rules followed in sequencing or arranging. When it felt finished it was finished. Occasionally, when I added one more track, I would listen back and realize it was one too many. Since I could be in complete control I avoided controlling anything (including the recordings themselves).
