= A Multitude of Angels =

Box set by Keith Jarrett
- Released: November 4, 2016
- Recorded: October 23–30, 1996
- Venue: Modena, Ferrara, Torino, and Genova, Italy
- Length: 4:57:06
- Label: ECM; ECM 2500/03
- Producer: Keith Jarrett

Keith Jarrett chronology
Creation (2015)	A Multitude of Angels (2016)	After the Fall (2018)

Keith Jarrett solo piano chronology
Creation (2015)	A Multitude of Angels (2016)	La Fenice (2018)

Professional ratings
Review scores
Source	Rating
AllMusic	4/5 stars
DownBeat	5/5 stars
The Guardian	4/5 stars
The Irish Times	5/5 stars
Financial Times	5/5 stars
PopMatters	8/10 stars
Stereophile [performance]	5/5 stars
The Times	3/5 stars

A Multitude of Angels is a four-disc live box set of solo piano performances by Keith Jarrett recorded in Italy over a week in October 1996 and released on ECM twenty years later.

== Music and recording ==
The music comes from four concerts recorded in Italy: in Modena, Ferrara, Torino, and Genova, on October 23, 25, 28, and 30, 1996, respectively. Jarrett recorded the concerts himself on a DAT machine. Each consists of one performance without breaks; these were among the last times that Jarrett took this approach to performance. After the concerts, he withdrew from playing in public, because of chronic fatigue syndrome.

== Release and reception ==
A Multitude of Angels was released by ECM Records on November 4, 2016.

John Fordham of The Guardian commented that, "Jarrett has always favoured exhaustive documentation, but the intensity, variety, and astonishing technical command of these performances might well persuade devoted fans and intrigued improv enthusiasts alike of his view that these were landmark moments."

John Garratt of PopMatters wrote that, "The four-disc box set A Multitude of Angels is the new turning point in Jarrett's career where he pushed himself too hard. His temporary illness is our gain.... [It] tells the music world what Keith Jarrett fans already knew—that the man could be an endless fountain of music, a one-man jam-band that only needed 88 keys to balance the Law of Fate with the Law of Accident (according to his liner notes). Since that's the case, this box will not alter anyone's perception of Jarrett or change his reputation overall."

== Track listing ==
All tracks are written by Keith Jarrett except as noted.

Disc one: Recorded in Modena on October 23, 1996 – Teatro Comunale
No.	Title	Writer(s)	Length
1.	"Part I"		34:18
2.	"Part II"		31:19
3.	"Danny Boy"	Frederic Weatherly	5:00
Total length:			1:10:37

Disc two: Recorded in Ferrara on October 25, 1996 – Teatro Comunale
No.	Title	Length
1.	"Part I"	43:48
2.	"Part II"	29:58
3.	"Encore"	3:26
Total length:		1:17:12

Disc three: Recorded in Torino on October 28, 1996 – Teatro Regio
No.	Title	Length
1.	"Part I"	42:23
2.	"Part II"	31:35
Total length:		1:13:58

Disc four: Recorded in Genova on October 30, 1996 – Teatro Carlo Felice
No.	Title	Writer(s)	Length
1.	"Part I"		31:41
2.	"Part II"		31:43
3.	"Encore"		5:52
4.	"Over the Rainbow"	E.Y. Harburg; Harold Arlen	6:03
Total length:			1:15:19
