= Shades (Keith Jarrett album) =

Studio album by Keith Jarrett
- Released: 1976
- Recorded: December 10–12, 1975
- Studio: Generation Sound Studios, New York City (USA)
- Genre: Jazz
- Length: 33:46
- Label: Impulse!
- Producer: Esmond Edwards

Keith Jarrett chronology
Mysteries (1976)	Shades (1976)	Hymns/Spheres (1976)

Keith Jarrett American Quartet chronology
Mysteries (1976)	Shades (1976)	The Survivors' Suite (1977)

Shades is the fifth album on the Impulse label by jazz pianist Keith Jarrett. Originally released in 1976, it features performances by Jarrett's 'American Quartet', which included Dewey Redman, Charlie Haden and Paul Motian with Guilherme Franco added on percussion.

Aside from appearing in the Mysteries: The Impulse Years 1975-1976 boxset, Shades was only issued on compact disc in Japan, packaged in a miniature replica of the original vinyl LP sleeve. In October 2011, it was reissued internationally as part of the Impulse! 2-on-1 series, packaged with Mysteries in a single disc format titled Mysteries / Shades.

== Music ==
Jarrett biographer Wolfgang Sandner stated that, with Shades, "we are dealing with... the be-bop tradition plus some widenings of range toward free jazz," noting that, although the pieces on the album tend to use the standard theme/solo/theme format, in "Diatribe," "musical parameters like structure and formal construction lose significance in sections with those unbelievable tremolo bass strokes by Charlie Haden, waterfalls of sound wildly swept over the keyboard by Keith Jarrett, and Dewey Redman growling, biting, and snarling with his mouthpiece, squelching musical phrases in orgiastic screams."

In his book Free Jazz, Harmolodics, and Ornette Coleman, author Stephen Rush noted Coleman's influence on Jarrett, calling "Shades of Jazz" "a foray by Keith Jarrett deep into the land of Harmolodics." Regarding Jarrett's solo on the piece, Rush commented: "Jarrett keeps his left hand 'out of the way.' For the most part he plays the piano the way Ornette plays the horn - weaving in and out of harmonic areas or implications." While Jarrett stays close to the key of F, and uses phrasing to generate a sense of swing, the solo is "almost James Joycean in its free flow, it often starts with short snippets followed by longer and longer phrases... Jarrett changes the rules of the game by playing an instrument that does not imply harmony in a linear way, but of course can play the chords themselves."

== Reception ==
Professional ratings
Review scores
Source	Rating
Allmusic	4.5/5 stars
The Rolling Stone Jazz Record Guide	3/5 stars

The Allmusic review by Scott Yanow awarded the album 4½ stars, stating, "Throughout, bassist Charlie Haden, drummer Paul Motian and percussionist Guilherme Franco keep the band's juices flowing.".

Pianist / composer Ethan Iverson declared that "every piece on Shades... is exceptional." He described "Shades of Jazz" as "a goddamn classic," and called "Southern Smiles" "one of the Jarrett's best folk-rock-gospel numbers, joyous and unrestrained," praising Redman's solo as "'wrong' but oh so right." Regarding "Rose Petals," he wrote "the opening melody is perfect, a blend of stately and crunchy. Oh baby, what are you doing to me?" Concerning "Diatribe," Iverson commented: "The masterworks continue with the band at their most deconstructed. Haden goes all in with the bow, and the expanded percussion section is hilarious. Jarrett bangs around: he is so much better at this now than he was at the beginning, the pitches are more controlled, the phrases connect. And Dewey Redman is there, screaming through his horn. Everything Redman plays links the deepest blues to the most esoteric avant-garde."

In an article for Burning Ambulance, Phil Freeman stated: "This is an excellent record. It's definitely the farthest out I've heard the group go so far." He called "Shades of Jazz" "a red-hot track, and a great start to the album," and remarked: "Charlie Haden and Paul Motian set up a powerful groove that swings so hard it's almost dance music. Redman reappears just after the halfway mark, and tears into a solo that sends the whole thing rocketing skyward." Concerning "Diatribe," Freeman wrote: "Jarrett... is really pounding away, heading almost into Cecil Taylor territory. Redman's solo is a festival of growl and skronk, basically prefiguring Charles Gayle, and there's both drumming and other percussion behind him, making for a ferocious overall attack that reminds me of the title track from Archie Shepp's The Magic Of Ju-Ju."

== Tributes ==
A version of "Shades of Jazz" was recorded by a group featuring saxophonist Joe Lovano, trumpeter Tom Harrell, bassist Dennis Irwin, and drummer Adam Nussbaum for a 2000 album titled As Long as You're Living Yours: The Music of Keith Jarrett. A reviewer for The Washington Post praised this rendition as "a joyous tennis game of volleyed phrases, pointing out Jarrett's great debt to the free-jazz aesthetic of Ornette Coleman."

Saxophonist Branford Marsalis recorded a version of "Rose Petals" for his 1990 album Crazy People Music.

On June 29, 2014, a group featuring saxophonist Greg Osby, keyboard players Dan Tepfer and James Weidman, bassist Ben Allison, and drummer Matt Wilson honored Jarrett with a concert titled "Shades of Jazz: Keith Jarrett's Music" at the Iridium Jazz Club in New York City.

== Track listing ==
All compositions by Keith Jarrett

1. "Shades of Jazz" - 9:54
2. "Southern Smiles" - 7:52
3. "Rose Petals" - 8:56
4. "Diatribe" - 7:04

== Personnel ==
- Keith Jarrett – piano, wood drums, percussion
- Dewey Redman – tenor saxophone, maracas, tambourine
- Charlie Haden – bass
- Paul Motian – drums, percussion
- Guilherme Franco – percussion

Production

- Esmond Edwards – producer
- Tony May – engineer (recording)
- Tom Wilkes – art director
- Harry Mittman – photography
