= Standards, Vol. 2 =

Studio album by Keith Jarrett
- Released: April 1985
- Recorded: January 11–12, 1983
- Studios: Power Station, New York City
- Genre: Jazz
- Length: 45:08
- Label: ECM 1289
- Producer: Manfred Eicher

Keith Jarrett chronology
Changes (1984)	Standards, Vol. 2 (1985)	Standards Live (1986)

Jarrett / Peacock / DeJohnette chronology
Changes (1984)	Standards, Vol. 2 (1985)	Standards Live (1986)

Standards, Vol. 2 is an album by American jazz pianist Keith Jarrett recorded over two days in January 1983 and released on ECM in April 1985 on vinyl and CD—the successor to Standards, Vol. 1 and Changes, recorded concurrently. The trio features rhythm section Gary Peacock and Jack DeJohnette the third release by the long-standing "Standards Trio".

In 2008 the Standards albums and Changes were collected into a boxed set, Setting Standards: New York Sessions.

== Background ==
Keith Jarrett, Gary Peacock and Jack DeJohnette had originally worked together on a 1977 album headline by Peacock, Tales of Another, coming back together in 1983 when producer Manfred Eicher proposed a trio album to Jarrett. Jarrett approached Peacock and DeJohnette with the idea of performing standards, which was greatly contrary to the contemporary jazz scene of the early 1980s. In a 2008 interview with the San Francisco Chronicle, Jarrett recalled his reasons for wanting to record standards. "This material was so damn good," he said, "and why was everyone ignoring it and playing clever stuff that sounds all the same?" He told Salon in 2000 that "[a] valuable player doesn't have to play anything new to have value, because it's not about the material, it's about the playing."

The three joined in a studio in Manhattan, New York City for a two and a half day session during which they recorded enough material for three albums, the two Standards albums and Changes. For that session, as in subsequent, the trio did not rehearse or pre-plan their playlist.

DeJohnette, also speaking to the San Francisco Chronicle, recalled that the trio had agreed to "do this until we don't feel like doing this anymore". In 2008, the trio celebrated its 25th anniversary, becoming during that time "the preeminent jazz group interpreting standards".

== Reception ==
Professional ratings
Review scores
Source	Rating
AllMusic	4/5 stars
The Penguin Guide to Jazz	4/4 stars

Unlike Standards, Vol. 1, Standards, Vol. 2 did not chart, but according to jazz commentator Scott Yanow the album "gets the edge over the first due to its slightly more challenging material". Yanow characterizes Jarrett's performance in this set as "surprisingly playful".

Jazz musician and writer Ian Carr noted in his biography of Jarrett that with these volumes the trio had found "fresh ways of approaching the classic jazz repertoire". In its review of the box set, PopMatters noted that the material "sounded dazzling in the mid-1980s", adding that "[f]ans of Jarrett, like myself, will always hear these records as having a fresh immediacy".

== Track listing ==
1. "So Tender" (Jarrett) – 7:19
2. "Moon and Sand" (William Engvick, Morty Palitz, Alec Wilder) – 8:59
3. "In Love in Vain" (Jerome Kern, Leo Robin) – 7:14
4. "Never Let Me Go" (Ray Evans, Jay Livingston) – 7:52
5. "If I Should Lose You" (Ralph Rainger, Leo Robin) – 8:32
6. "I Fall in Love Too Easily" (Sammy Cahn, Jule Styne) – 5:12

== Personnel ==
=== Standards Trio ===
- Keith Jarrett – piano
- Gary Peacock – double bass
- Jack DeJohnette – drums

=== Production ===
- Manfred Eicher – producer
- Jan Erik Kongshaug – recording engineer
- Barbara Wojirsch – cover design
