= Budapest Concert =

Live album by Keith Jarrett
- Released: October 30, 2020
- Recorded: July 3, 2016
- Venue: Béla Bartók National Concert Hall; Budapest, Hungary
- Length: 1:32:02
- Label: ECM 2700/01
- Producer: Keith Jarrett

Keith Jarrett chronology
Munich 2016 (2019)	Budapest Concert (2020)	Bordeaux Concert (2022)

Keith Jarrett solo piano chronology
La Fenice (2018)	Budapest Concert (2020)	Bordeaux Concert (2022)

Budapest Concert is a live solo double-album by American pianist and composer Keith Jarrett recorded at the Béla Bartók National Concert Hall, Budapest on July 3, 2016 and released on ECM in October 2020.

== Background ==
Jarrett viewed the concert as a sort of homecoming due to his ancestry, which reaches back to Hungary.

== 2016 solo concerts ==
According to www.keithjarrett.org, in 2016 Jarrett played a total of 8 solo piano concerts. Budapest Concert was recorded at the fourth of those concerts, on the first night of his European tour.

- February 9 - Isaac Stern Auditorium, Carnegie Hall, New York City (USA)
- April 29 - Walt Disney Concert Hall, Los Angeles, CA (USA)
- May 2 - Davies Symphony Hall, San Francisco, CA (USA)
- July 3 - Béla Bartók National Concert Hall, Palace of Arts, Budapest, Hungary
- July 6 - L’Auditorium de Bordeaux, Bordeaux, France
- July 9 - Goldener Saal, Musikverein, Vienna, Austria
- July 12 - Parco Della Musica, Rome, Italy
- July 16 - Philharmonie, Gasteig, Munich, Germany

== Reception ==
Professional ratings
Review scores
Source	Rating
AllMusic	4/5 stars
All About Jazz #1	3.5/5 stars
All About Jazz #2	4/5 stars

In a review for AllMusic, Thom Jurek wrote: "The first half... is challenging, as its knotty improvisations sometimes require rigorous attention. That said, the more melodically redolent back half welcomes even casual listeners. Jarrett regards this as his current 'gold standard' for live improvisation, and given its reach and focus, it's difficult to argue with him—especially now."

Writing for All About Jazz, Karl Ackermann commented: "There are touches of gospel, classical and country, accompanying Jarrett's deep reservoir of jazz stylings. 'Part I' opens the set as a lengthy athematic ramble but he limits the most jagged edges to 'Part IX' and 'Part X.' 'Part VI' has an jumpy boogie-woogie rhythm, 'Part VII' is nuevo-spiritual, and 'Part XII -Blues' is the kind of rollicking blues that helped make Jarrett famous. But Jarrett's rhapsodic paeans such as 'Part V' and 'Part VIII' make for superb listening... Though the concert was recorded two years before Jarrett's first stroke, there is a pervading melancholy across much of Budapest Concert that now feels prescient. It is not among the best of Jarrett's live solo recordings, but there are more than enough standout gems to make it a worthy addition to his catalog."

In a separate article for All About Jazz, Scott Gudell stated: "Jarrett opens with articulate twists and turns on the first piece then soothes us with comforting pianistic whispers in the second selection. Whether the concert music is brisk and upbeat or haunting and subtle, there are times it seems that Jarrett's intimate explorations are for himself alone but, with Jarrett as a guide, the listener is invited into his inner circle... Towards the end of the evening, Jarrett christens 'Part XII' with an extra descriptive word—'blues'—thus escorting the audience back about a hundred years to the fountainhead of so much heartfelt music. The concert concludes with an inviting interpretation of the classic, 'Answer Me, My Love,' a Jarrett favorite that he has performed a number of times."

A review by Nick Lea at Jazz Views states: "Budapest Concert is a most welcome addition, and should be viewed as a distinctly separate work from Munich 2016, a different day and set of circumstances responsible for its creation. The music on this outstanding set finds the pianist in peak form and provides a rich tapestry of music over nearly an hour and a half... let us hope that more of this final tour were recorded and are released in due course. It would then be a fascinating experience to listen the music in chronological order, following the pianist's journey from city to city, and hear how each shaped the music created."

Rob Shepherd, in a review for PostGenre, wrote: "Budapest Concert should rank among Jarrett’s finest due to its ability to both stir the audience's emotions while generating significant contemplation."

Writing for London Jazz News, John Bungey remarked: "you can't reach musical heights without trekking through the foothills first. There's a good deal of circling base camp here—before he discovers some nuggets that glister with his best."

== Track listing ==
All compositions by Keith Jarrett except where noted.

Disc #1

1. "Part I" - 14:42
2. "Part II" - 6:54
3. "Part III" - 8:10
4. "Part IV" - 7:35

Disc #2

1. "Part V" - 5:13
2. "Part VI" - 3:52
3. "Part VII" - 5:45
4. "Part VIII" - 5:35
5. "Part IX" - 2:42
6. "Part X" - 8:40
7. "Part XI" - 5:54
8. "Part XII - Blues" - 4:04
9. "It's A Lonesome Old Town" (Charles Kisco, Harry Tobias) - 8:01
10. "Answer Me, My Love" (Fred Rauch, Gerhard Winkler) - 4:55

== Personnel ==
- Keith Jarrett – piano

=== Production ===
- Keith Jarrett – producer
- Manfred Eicher – executive producer
- Martin Pearson – recording engineer
- Christoph Stickel – mastering engineer
- Sascha Kleis – design
