= Munich 2016 =

Live album by Keith Jarrett
- Released: November 1, 2019
- Recorded: July 16, 2016
- Venues: Gasteig Philharmonie; Munich, Germany
- Length: 93:33
- Labels: ECM, ECM 2667/68
- Producer: Keith Jarrett

Keith Jarrett chronology
La Fenice (2018)	Munich 2016 (2019)	Budapest Concert (2020)

Munich 2016 is a live solo double-album by American pianist and composer Keith Jarrett recorded at the Philharmonic Hall in Munich on July 16, 2016 and released on ECM in November 2019.

== 2016 solo concerts ==
According to www.keithjarrett.org, in 2016 Jarrett played a total of 8 solo piano concerts. Munich 2016 was recorded at the last of those concerts, on the last night of his European tour, which retroactively became Jarrett's final.

- February 9 - Isaac Stern Auditorium, Carnegie Hall, New York City (USA)
- April 29 - Walt Disney Concert Hall, Los Angeles, CA (USA)
- May 2 - Davies Symphony Hall, San Francisco, CA (USA)
- July 3 - Béla Bartók National Concert Hall, Palace of Arts, Budapest, Hungary
- July 6 - L’Auditorium de Bordeaux, Bordeaux, France
- July 9 - Goldener Saal, Musikverein, Vienna, Austria
- July 12 - Parco Della Musica, Rome, Italy
- July 16 - Philharmonie, Gasteig, Munich, Germany

== Reception ==
Professional ratings
Review scores
Source	Rating
All About Jazz #1	4/5 stars
All About Jazz #2	4.5/5 stars
DownBeat	4.5/5 stars
Jazz Journal	4.5/5 stars
Pitchfork	7.9/10

In a review for Pitchfork, Madison Bloom wrote: "Munich 2016 provides a snapshot of the piano legend in his seventies: energetic, spontaneous, and inventive as ever... He is so exhilarated by the music that he cannot stop himself from stomping, shouting, and humming off-key throughout the 12-part improvisational suite... Jarrett's talent and ingenuity are self-evident—and so is his passion for the music that shaped him."

Writing for UDiscover Music, Charles Waring called Munich 2016 "magnificent", and commented: "No single Keith Jarrett live album is the same, but they’re all special. As Munich 2016 so clearly shows, every one of the pianist's solo concerts is a unique, never-to-be-repeated performance. The audience never knows what it's going to hear. There is, however, always one certainty: they'll get to witness a master musician at the peak of his powers. And that’s what Munich 2016 guarantees. As immersive concert experiences go, it's right up there with The Köln Concert."

Mike Jurkovic, in a review for All About Jazz, stated: "Keith Jarrett continues to astonish with the music he conjures from thin air... Jarrett now spontaneously composes suites, shorter pieces brought to life by his keen, tireless muse and the environment in which he is playing..." In a separate article for All About Jazz, Karl Ackermann wrote: "His improvisational skills in top form, he displays his genius across twelve extemporaneous compositions and three encores... The improviser's diversity and unrelenting inventiveness continue to be stunning. It is possible to listen to Jarrett's dozen live solo collections—including box set and multi-disc releases—and never feel that you're covering the customary territory. Barring the standards-focused encores, nostalgia is no match for the emotional power of Jarrett's spontaneous creations."

In an article for Between Sound and Space, Tyran Grillo wrote:

Throughout this two-disc recording... Jarrett unveils 12 numbered sculptures of possibility, each more freestanding than the last. Not that the path between them is linear. What begins in Part I—the set’s longest, just shy of 14 minutes—as a many-tentacled deep sea creature has by Part III already morphed into a landbound shepherd. The latter's hymnal qualities light a gospel fire in the underground railroad lantern of Part IV before dissolving into the child's dream that is Part V... Part VI marks another change of face, uniting questions of mountains above with answers of valleys below. The contortions of Parts VII, IX, and XII are ages between, giving way to meditations in which un-pressed keys speak as truthfully as their contacted neighbors. Few are so profound in this regard as Part XI, of which a certain air of finality is only as permanent as the wind on which it's written. It whispers as an antidote to the shouting match that has become our lives... In light of all this, we get a trinity of shades in Jarrett's choice of encores. In 'Answer Me, My Love,' he embraces the past as if it were a dying future. In 'It's A Lonesome Old Town,' he embraces the present as if it were the only hope of peace. And in 'Somewhere Over The Rainbow,' he lets go of all three states of mind, knowing that honesty of expression is the only wave we can catch to keep him visible as he follows one horizon in search of the next.

Writing for London Jazz News, Patrick Hadfield commented: "Every time I see there's a new release of solo piano by Keith Jarrett, I find myself asking the same question: do I really need another Keith Jarrett record? But after hearing the album, the answer is invariably the same: a resounding YES!"

== Track listing ==
All compositions by Keith Jarrett except where noted.

Disc #1

1. "Part I" - 13:58
2. "Part II" - 7:23
3. "Part III" - 6:15
4. "Part IV" - 4:15
5. "Part V" - 4:29
6. "Part VI" - 6:08
7. "Part VII" - 2:20

Disc #2

1. "Part VIII" - 8:08
2. "Part IX" - 3:27
3. "Part X" - 7:44
4. "Part XI" - 9:01
5. "Part XII" - 3:19
6. "Answer Me, My Love" (Fred Rauch, Gerhard Winkler) - 4:40
7. "It's a Lonesome Old Town" (Charles Kisco, Harry Tobias) - 5:43
8. "Somewhere over the Rainbow" (E.Y. Harburg, Harold Arlen) - 6:43

== Personnel ==
- Keith Jarrett – piano

=== Production ===
- Keith Jarrett – producer
- Manfred Eicher – executive producer
- Martin Pearson – engineer (recording)
- Christoph Stickel – engineer (mastering)
- Sascha Kleis – design
