= Book of Ways =

Studio album by Keith Jarrett
- Released: September 1987
- Recorded: July 1986
- Studio: Tonstudio Bauer; Ludwigsburg, W. Germany
- Genre: Improvised music
- Length: 1:41:02
- Label: ECM; ECM 1344/45
- Producer: Manfred Eicher

Keith Jarrett chronology
| Spirits (1986) | Book of Ways (1987) | Still Live (1988) |

Book of Ways: The Feeling of Strings is a solo double album by American jazz pianist Keith Jarrett recorded over four hours in July 1986 and released on ECM September the following year, comprising nineteen clavichord improvisations.

== Recording ==
As Jarrett stated in an interview with pianist Ted Rosenthal appeared in the Jan-Feb 1997 issue of "Piano and Keyboard magazine":

"That whole recording was done in one afternoon and everything was a first take and nothing was coming from any pre-ordained thing. I had no material.... I think Book of Ways is one of the recordings I wish more people would know. I think it has more of what I hear on it than a lot of things (I do) on piano because piano is piano. These two clavichords together made a different instrument. You could use vibrato on one of them and not the other one, and play unison. I was playing two at the same time as you probably could tell.

In the original liner notes for the compilation album "Keith Jarrett Selected Recordings", with music selected by Mr. Jarrett himself, he states that:

A Note on Book of Ways: To my knowledge, this recording is unique in several ways. We had three clavichords in the studio, two of which were angled together so that I could play them both simultaneously, and the third off to the side. Also we miked the instruments very closely so that the full range of dynamics could be used (clavichords are very quiet and cannot be heard more than a few feet away). The two CDs were made on an off day between concerts with my Trio, and no material was organized beforehand. Everything was spontaneous. The recording was done in four hours.

== Reception ==
Professional ratings
Review scores
| Source | Rating |
|---|---|
| AllMusic | 3/5 stars |
| The Penguin Guide to Jazz Recordings | 2/4 stars |

The AllMusic review by Richard S. Ginell awarded the album 3 stars, stating:

Jarrett occasionally tries to stretch the instrument's limited possibilities, hammering percussively on the close-miked strings. Yet for the most part, Jarrett reins in his world-class technique in order to make unpretentiously minimal music on this ancient keyboard. Some of it sounds like folk music, some like new age contemplation, there are convincing neo-baroque musings, and a few of these untitled though numbered selections kick into a higher gear. Sometimes this music is charming; a lot of the time, it gets wearisome. But hey, they also laughed when Keith started putting out massive sets of solo piano...

For his 2002 "Keith Jarrett Selected Recordings" album review (which contains "Book of Ways" #12, #14 and #18), Peter Marsh at BBC calls it "extraordinary" and that "the results echo back to Baroque's original role as context for improvisation and simultaneously (through the use of unconventional techniques) rockets it forward a few hundred years."

== Track listing ==
All music by Keith Jarrett

Disc one

1. "Book of Ways 1" – 9:08
2. "Book of Ways 2" – 3:41
3. "Book of Ways 3" – 4:03
4. "Book of Ways 4" – 4:54
5. "Book of Ways 5" – 2:58
6. "Book of Ways 6" – 4:09
7. "Book of Ways 7" – 3:36
8. "Book of Ways 8" – 5:35
9. "Book of Ways 9" – 5:02
10. "Book of Ways 10" – 3:35

Disc two

1. "Book of Ways 11" – 6:16
2. "Book of Ways 12" – 4:08
3. "Book of Ways 13" – 4:38
4. "Book of Ways 14" – 7:13
5. "Book of Ways 15" – 5:48
6. "Book of Ways 16" – 7:37
7. "Book of Ways 17" – 3:56
8. "Book of Ways 18" – 7:16
9. "Book of Ways 19" – 5:38

== Personnel ==
- Keith Jarrett – clavichord

=== Technical personnel ===
- Manfred Eicher – producer
- Martin Wieland – recording engineer
- Barbara Wojirsch – cover design and layout
- Kishin Shinoyama – photo
