= Bordeaux Concert =

Live album by Keith Jarrett
- Released: 2022, September 30.
- Recorded: 2016, July 6.
- Venue: L'Auditorium de Bordeaux, Bordeaux, France
- Length: 77:30
- Label: ECM
- Producer: Keith Jarrett

Keith Jarrett chronology
Budapest Concert (2020)	Bordeaux Concert (2022)

Keith Jarrett solo piano chronology
Budapest Concert (2020)	Bordeaux Concert (2022)

Bordeaux Concert is a solo piano album by Keith Jarrett containing music recorded live on July 6, 2016, at L’Auditorium de Bordeaux, Bordeaux, during a European tour. It was released by ECM Records on CD in September 2022.

This concert was produced by Jazz And Wine Bordeaux Festival for the opening concert of the 2016 edition and celebrates the 10 anniversary of the festival. The festival rented the Bordeaux Auditorium for that event.

== 2016 solo concerts ==
According to keithjarrett.org, in 2016 Jarrett played a total of 8 solo piano concerts. Bordeaux Concert was recorded at the fifth of those concerts, on the second night of his European tour.

- February 9 – Isaac Stern Auditorium, Carnegie Hall, New York City (US)
- April 29 – Walt Disney Concert Hall, Los Angeles, California (US)
- May 2 – Davies Symphony Hall, San Francisco, California (US)
- July 3 – Béla Bartók National Concert Hall, Palace of Arts, Budapest, Hungary
- July 6 – L'Auditorium de Bordeaux, Bordeaux, France
- July 9 – Goldener Saal, Musikverein, Vienna, Austria
- July 12 – Parco Della Musica, Rome, Italy
- July 16 – Philharmonie, Gasteig, Munich, Germany

== Reception ==
Professional ratings
Review scores
Source	Rating
All About Jazz	4/5 stars
AllMusic	4/5 stars
The Daily Telegraph	4/5 stars
The Guardian	4/5 stars
DownBeat	4/5 stars

In a review for AllMusic, Thom Jurek wrote that the album "is not for the Jarrett beginner, but for seasoned fans of his many solo recordings, that are, after all, responsible for a sizeable portion of his legendary reputation. The dialogue he engages in with the piano here challenges its own assertions with an unassuming, even reverential authority. This is not only masterful, it soulful, interrogatory, and virtuosic."

The Guardian's John Fordham noted that "everything from the softest improvised ballads to the most exuberantly hard-stomping blues draw grateful accolades – the sound of an audience's thanks for a one-off music that belonged only to their presence with Jarrett, in that space, on that unique evening."

Mike Jurkovic, writing for All About Jazz, called the album "a remarkable listen," and stated: "Bordeaux Concert feels like it has always been there. In the air, in the heart, in the quiet turnings of a world at large. Just waiting for one to encounter it and come to the greater understanding of just how beautiful, how peaceful, this life can be."

In an article for The Daily Telegraph, Ivan Hewett remarked: "If this album turns out to be Jarrett's farewell, it will be a more than worthy one."

Jim Hynes of Glide Magazine wrote: "Every Jarrett solo performance holds its own magical appeal and Bordeaux certainly holds its own with any of the others in his storied catalog."

Associated Press writer Steven Wine praised the album's "astounding mix of intensity, introspection and invention," and commented: "Structure and pacing are a marvel as Jarrett's on-the-spot composition swings between gorgeous lyricism and dissonant, distressed chromatic explorations that abandon tempo... One yearning melody unfolds like an invitation to hum, and so Jarrett does. He likes what he's hearing, and it's easy to understand why."

== Track listing ==
All compositions by Keith Jarrett.

1. "Part I" – 12:45
2. "Part II" – 4:44
3. "Part III" – 4:33
4. "Part IV" – 7:47
5. "Part V" – 6:16
6. "Part VI" – 4:23
7. "Part VII" – 7:28
8. "Part VIII" – 5:48
9. "Part IX" – 4:39
10. "Part X" – 2:54
11. "Part XI" – 6:08
12. "Part XII – 5:34
13. "Part XIII – 4:31

== Personnel ==
- Keith Jarrett – piano

Production

- Keith Jarrett – producer
- Manfred Eicher – executive producer
- Martin Pearson – engineer (recording)
- Christoph Stickel – engineer (mastering)
- Sascha Kleis – design
- Max Franosch – cover photography

== Charts ==
Chart performance for Bordeaux Concert
Chart (2022)	Peak position
Belgian Albums (Ultratop Flanders)	78
Belgian Albums (Ultratop Wallonia)	126
German Albums (Offizielle Top 100)	49
