= Standards Live =

Live album by Keith Jarrett
- Released: January 1986
- Recorded: July 2, 1985
- Venue: Palais des congrès de Paris; Paris, France
- Genre: Jazz
- Length: 54:19
- Label: ECM 1317
- Producer: Manfred Eicher

Keith Jarrett chronology
Standards, Vol. 2 (1985)	Standards Live (1986)	Spirits (1986)

Jarrett / Peacock / DeJohnette chronology
Standards, Vol. 2 (1985)	Standards Live (1986)	Still Live (1988)

Standards Live is a live album by the Keith Jarrett Trio recorded at the Palais des congrès de Paris on July 2, 1985, and released on ECM in January of the following year—the debut live album by Jarrett's Standards Trio, featuring rhythm section Gary Peacock and Jack DeJohnette.

== Reception ==
Professional ratings
Review scores
Source	Rating
AllMusic	4/5 stars
The Penguin Guide to Jazz	3/4 stars

Jazz commentator Scott Yanow states that "[t]he interplay between the players was constantly impressive." The Rough Guide to Jazz describes the concert as "exceptional", singling out the performance of "Too Young to Go Steady" as "one of the most perfect and exultant trio performances in the whole of jazz."

In his biography of Jarrett, Ian Carr describes the album as "superlative: the incredible dynamism, the sheer creativity of the three men, the feeling of ecstasy that pervades the whole concert and the interplay and inter-dependence of the trio," singling out "Stella by Starlight" as "exquisite and gripping".

== July 1985 Tour ==
Standards Live was recorded during the "Standards trio" July 1985 European tour which, according to www.keithjarrett.org, offered 12 recitals in 26 days:

- 1 – Paris (France)
- 2 – Paris (France)
- 3 – Ravenna (Italy)
- 4 – Ravenna (Italy)
- 10 – Montreux (Switzerland)
- 12 – Den Haag (Netherlands)
- 15 – Lyon (France) during the Nuits de Fourvière festival
- 17 – Salon-de-Provence (France)
- 18 – San Sebastian, Donostia (Spain) during the San Sebastian Jazz Festival
- 19 – San Sebastian, Donostia (Spain)
- 23 – Antibes (France)
- 26 – Montpellier (France)

== Track listing ==
1. "Stella by Starlight" (Ned Washington, Victor Young) – 11:15
2. "The Wrong Blues" (William Engvick, Alec Wilder) – 8:03
3. "Falling in Love with Love" (Lorenz Hart, Richard Rodgers) – 8:44
4. "Too Young to Go Steady" (Harold Adamson, Jimmy McHugh) – 10:10
5. "The Way You Look Tonight" (Dorothy Fields, Jerome Kern) – 9:31
6. "The Old Country" (Nat Adderley, Curtis Lewis) – 6:36

== Personnel ==
=== Standards Trio ===
- Keith Jarrett – piano
- Gary Peacock – double bass
- Jack DeJohnette – drums

=== Technical personnel ===
- Manfred Eicher – producer
  - Studio Grande Armée
- Martin Wieland – recording engineer
- Barbara Wojirsch – design
- Franz Kafka – illustration from "The Diaries of Franz Kafka 1914–1923"
