= Tokyo '96 =

Live album by Keith Jarrett
- Released: April 1998
- Recorded: March 30, 1996
- Venue: Bunkamura Orchard Hall; Tokyo, Japan
- Genre: Jazz
- Length: 1:19:05
- Label: ECM; ECM 1666
- Producer: Manfred Eicher

Keith Jarrett chronology
The Impulse Years: 1973-1974 (1997)	Tokyo '96 (1998)	The Melody at Night, with You (1999)

Jarrett / Peacock / DeJohnette chronology
Keith Jarrett at the Blue Note (1995)	Tokyo '96 (1998)	Whisper Not (2000)

Professional ratings
Review scores
Source	Rating
AllMusic	4.5/5 stars
The Penguin Guide to Jazz	3/4 stars

Tokyo '96 is a live album by American jazz pianist Keith Jarrett recorded at the Bunkamura Orchard Hall in Shibuya, Tokyo on March 30, 1996 and released on ECM in April 1998. The trio—Jarrett's "Standards Trio"—features rhythm section Gary Peacock and Jack DeJohnette.

== Background ==
Filmed footage of the concert was originally released as Trio Concert 1996.

To celebrate the 25th anniversary of the Standards Trio in 2008, ECM acquired rights to the filmed performance and released a double-DVD set called Live in Japan 93/96, which featured Trio Concert 1996 and another Trio film, Live at Open Theater East.

== March–April 1996 Tour in Japan ==
Tokyo '96 was recorded on March 30 during a tour in Japan where Jarrett's "Standard trio" performed ten times in 16 days.

- March 20 – Public Hall, Shibuya
- March 22 – Sunpalace Hall, Fukuoka
- March 25 – Festival Hall, Osaka
- March 26 – Kaikan Hall 1, Kyoto
- March 28 – Arts Center, Aichi
- March 30 – Orchard Hall, Bunkamura, Tokyo
- April 1 – Orchard Hall, Bunkamura, Tokyo
- April 2 – Orchard Hall, Bunkamura, Tokyo
- April 4 – Arts Theater, Saitama
- April 5 – Kanagawa Kenmin Hall, Yokohama

== Reception ==
The AllMusic review by Richard S. Ginell awarded the album 4½ stars and states, "The standards trio lives up to its formidable track record of consistency and then some. Jarrett and perennial cohorts Gary Peacock and Jack DeJohnette are, if anything, even sharper, swinging harder and more attuned to each other than ever."

The November 1998 All About Jazz review by Christopher Hoard noted:

The music here is so startlingly pure in its conception, it sadly harkens to the fact that with few exceptions, little remains today in jazz which attains the force and beauty of those original standards, those moods and statements we find Jarrett continually resurrecting in a new hues and phrasings. Sadly it seems, Jarrett may be last in a line of this century's greatest musical impresarios. If you open up to the music revealed on this recording, it indeed seems improbable that any of a younger generation of jazz musicians will even attempt to live up to the standard this group realizes for meeting up with music and an audience in a room. I sincerely hope I'm wrong here.

The authors of The Penguin Guide to Jazz wrote, "The story continues, unstaunchable, maddeningly indulgent and selflessly brilliant by turns. There are moments of pure genius here."

== Track listing ==
1. "It Could Happen to You" (Johnny Burke, Jimmy Van Heusen) – 11:38
2. "Never Let Me Go" (Ray Evans, Jay Livingston) – 7:02
3. "Billie's Bounce" (Charlie Parker) – 8:07
4. "Summer Night" (Al Dubin, Harry Warren) – 7:37
5. "I'll Remember April" (Gene de Paul, Patricia Johnston, Don Raye) – 10:20
6. "Mona Lisa" (Evans, Livingston) – 3:16
7. "Autumn Leaves" (Joseph Kosma, Johnny Mercer, Jacques Prévert) – 7:58
8. "Last Night When We Were Young/Caribbean Sky" (Harold Arlen, Yip Harburg/Keith Jarrett) – 9:55
9. "John's Abbey" (Bud Powell) – 5:50
10. "My Funny Valentine/Song" (Lorenz Hart, Richard Rodgers/Jarrett) – 7:16

== Personnel ==
- Keith Jarrett – piano
- Gary Peacock – bass
- Jack DeJohnette – drums

=== Technical personnel ===
- Manfred Eicher – producer
- Toshio Yamanaka – recording engineer
- Michael Hofstetter – cover design
- Kuni Shinuhara – photography
