= Keith Jarrett at the Blue Note =

Live album / Box set by Keith Jarrett
- Released: October 1995
- Recorded: June 3–5, 1994
- Venue: Blue Note Jazz Club; New York City
- Genre: Jazz
- Length: 7:03:38
- Label: ECM; ECM 1575–80
- Producer: Manfred Eicher

Keith Jarrett chronology
Standards in Norway (1995)	Keith Jarrett at the Blue Note (1995)	Mysteries: The Impulse Years 1975-1976 (1996)

Jarrett / Peacock / DeJohnette chronology
Standards in Norway (1995)	Keith Jarrett at the Blue Note (1995)	Tokyo '96 (1998)

Keith Jarrett at the Blue Note: The Complete Recordings is a 6-CD live box set by American jazz pianist Keith Jarrett, compiling the six sets Jarrett's trio performed at the Blue Note Jazz Club in New York City over three nights in June 1994 and released by ECM in October the following year. The trio—Jarrett's "Standards Trio"—features rhythm section Gary Peacock and Jack DeJohnette.

== Reception ==
The AllMusic review by Scott Yanow awarded the set 5 stars, stating: "Never mind that this same group has already had ten separate releases since 1983; this box is still well worth getting.... Throughout the three nights at the Blue Note, the interplay among the musicians is consistently outstanding. Those listeners concerned about Jarrett's tendency to 'sing along' with his piano have little to fear for, other than occasional shouts and sighs, he wisely lets his piano do the talking."

Journalist Jon Pareles of The New York Times attended a set on June 3 recalling the "three-night engagement was Mr. Jarrett's first New York club date in 11 years, and for it he turned the club into a miniature concert hall; smoking was prohibited, and no food or drinks were served during the set". He compared Jarrett's approach with the one followed by Bill Evans and continued he "is a master of playing gently, and he refuses to push. Often, he would let a line grow softer as it climbed, creating quiet peaks. The music whispered and glimmered, seeking a pure, incorporeal song."

Stereophile's Wes Phillips called the sound "Amazing.... A piano trio recorded this well makes an impressive demonstration disc. DeJohnette is placed near the right speaker, Jarrett near the left, and Peacock stands well back in the middle—hey! where'd he come from? The instruments are prominently featured, but there's enough room acoustic to convince you this really took place somewhere. Somewhere intimate—not merely small, but close and personal."

In 1996, the box-set was awarded with "Album of the Year" in the DownBeat Critic's Poll.

Professional ratings
Review scores
Source	Rating
Allmusic	5/5 stars
The Penguin Guide to Jazz	4/4 stars
Musikexpress	5/6 stars

== Track listing ==
Disc one: Friday, June 3, 1994 (1st Set)

1. "In Your Own Sweet Way" (Dave Brubeck) - 17:59
2. "How Long Has This Been Going On?" (George Gershwin, Ira Gershwin) - 9:09
3. "While We're Young" (Alec Wilder) - 11:01
4. "Partners" (Keith Jarrett) - 8:28
5. "No Lonely Nights" (Keith Jarrett) - 7:16
6. "Now's the Time" (Charlie Parker) - 8:30
7. "Lament" (J. J. Johnson) - 7:09

Disc two: Friday, June 3, 1994 (2nd Set)

1. "I'm Old Fashioned" (Jerome Kern, Johnny Mercer) - 10:36
2. "Everything Happens to Me" (Tom Adair, Matt Dennis) - 11:49
3. "If I Were a Bell (Frank Loesser) - 11:26
4. "In the Wee Small Hours of the Morning" (Bob Hilliard, David Mann) - 8:45
5. "Oleo" (Sonny Rollins) - 8:03
6. "Alone Together" (Howard Dietz, Arthur Schwartz) - 11:20
7. "Skylark" (Hoagy Carmichael, Johnny Mercer) - 6:36
8. "Things Ain't What They Used to Be" (Mercer Ellington, Ted Persons) - 7:53

Disc three: Saturday, June 4, 1994 (1st Set)

1. "Autumn Leaves" (Joseph Kosma, Jacques Prévert, Johnny Mercer) - 26:43
2. "Days of Wine and Roses" (Henry Mancini, Johnny Mercer) - 11:30
3. "Bop-Be" (Keith Jarrett) - 6:18
4. "You Don't Know What Love Is/Muezzin" (Gene DePaul, Don Ray/Jarrett) - 20:31
5. "When I Fall in Love" (Edward Heyman, Victor Young) - 5:42

Disc four: Saturday, June 4, 1994 (2nd Set)

1. "How Deep Is the Ocean?" (Irving Berlin) - 11:25
2. "Close Your Eyes" (Bernice Petkere) - 9:27
3. "Imagination" (Johnny Burke, Jimmy Van Heusen) - 8:44
4. "I'll Close My Eyes" (Buddy Kaye, Billy Reid) - 10:11
5. "I Fall in Love Too Easily/The Fire Within" (Jule Styne, Sammy Cahn/Keith Jarrett) - 27:08
6. "Things Ain't What They Used to Be" (Mercer Ellington, Ted Persons) - 8:58

Disc five: Sunday, June 5, 1994 (1st Set)

1. "On Green Dolphin Street/Joy Ride" (Bronisław Kaper, Ned Washington/Jarrett) - 21:07
2. "My Romance" (Lorenz Hart, Richard Rodgers) - 9:40
3. "Don't Ever Leave Me" (Oscar Hammerstein II, Jerome Kern) - 5:08
4. "You'd Be So Nice to Come Home To" (Cole Porter) - 6:58
5. "La Valse Bleue" (Robert Wilbur) - 7:03
6. "No Lonely Nights" (Keith Jarrett) - 6:21
7. "Straight, No Chaser" (Thelonious Monk) - 6:13

Disc six: Sunday, June 5, 1994 (2nd Set)

1. "Time After Time" (Sammy Cahn, Jule Styne) - 12:36
2. "For Heaven's Sake" (Elise Bretton, Sherman Edwards, Donald Meyer) - 11:02
3. "Partners" (Keith Jarrett) - 8:56
4. "Desert Sun" (Keith Jarrett) - 28:32
5. "How About You?" (Ralph Freed, Burton Lane) - 7:11

== Personnel ==
=== Keith Jarrett Trio ===
- Keith Jarrett – piano
- Gary Peacock – double bass
- Jack DeJohnette – drums

=== Technical personnel ===
- Manfred Eicher – producer
- Jan Erik Kongshaug – recording engineer
- Barbara Wojirsch – cover design
