= The Impulse Years: 1973–1974 =

Compilation album by Keith Jarrett
- Released: 1997
- Recorded: February 24, 1973; February 27 and 28, 1974; October 9 and 10, 1974
- Venue: The Village Vanguard, New York City (discs 1 and 2); Generation Sound, New York City (discs 3-5)
- Genre: Jazz
- Label: Impulse! IMPD-5237
- Producer: Ed Michel

Keith Jarrett chronology
La Scala (1997)	The Impulse Years: 1973–1974 (1997)	Tokyo '96 (1998)

The Impulse Years: 1973–1974 is a 5-CD box set of Keith Jarrett albums, comprising Fort Yawuh, Treasure Island, Death and The Flower and Back Hand, plus previously unissued material. The set was released in 1997 by Impulse! Records and in 1998 by Universal / MCA.

The music was performed by Jarrett and his affectionately titled "American Quartet", which consisted of Charlie Haden, Paul Motian and Dewey Redman. Additional contributions were provided by Sam Brown (electric guitar) and the percussionists Guilherme Franco and Danny Johnson.

Aside from its appearance in this set, Back Hand has, to date, only ever been released on CD in Japan.

This set was preceded in 1996 by a four-CD box set called Mysteries: The Impulse Years 1975-1976, comprising Mysteries, Shades, Byablue and Bop-Be.

== Reception ==
Professional ratings
Review scores
Source	Rating
AllMusic	4.5/5 stars
The Penguin Guide to Jazz	3.5/4 stars

AllMusic awarded the album 4½ stars and its review by Scott Yanow says, "The music performed by this underrated group (which is heard at its best on the 22-and-a-half-minute "Death and the Flower" and "Inflight") is inside/outside, hinting at the avant-garde while not shy about using melodies and rhythms."

The authors of The Penguin Guide to Jazz awarded the album 3½ stars, commenting: "the alternate takes are often illuminating, but it's the unedited version of "Roads Traveled, Roads Veiled"... that is most interesting."

In Jazziz, Joseph Woodard wrote, "In the clear light of hindsight, the music here makes an even bolder impact than we'd expect. Jarrett's "American" band... was really one of the last great groups in jazz. The ensemble had a distinctive eclectic, an evolutionary sound at a time when jazz was in transition."

New York Times critic Peter Watrous singled out the album for his 1997 year-end box set selection, calling the band "one of the best groups of the 70's".

Writing for All About Jazz, Robert Spencer commented: "The program is exhaustive, but never exhausting... Haden is a monster throughout, and Motian is quick on the uptake. This set is as solid as any jazz being made in 1973 and 1974, and well worth picking up for Jarrett fans."

In a review for the Hartford Courant, Owen McNally praised the moments "when the quartet digs in and plays with controlled ferocity, or stops on a dime, or a paradigm, shifting into elegant, emotionally edged lyricism."

== Track listing ==
Disc 1: Fort Yawuh

1. "(If The) Misfits (Wear It)"
2. "Fort Yawuh"
3. "De Drums"
4. "Still Life, Still Life"
5. "(If The) Misfits (Wear It)" previously unreleased

Disc 2: Fort Yawuh

1. "Whistle Tune" previously unreleased
2. "Spoken Introduction" previously unreleased
3. "Angles (Without Edges)" previously unreleased
4. "Roads Traveled, Roads Veiled" previously unreleased (included in subsequent reissues of Fort Yawuh)
5. "De Drums" previously unreleased
6. "Melting The Ice" previously unreleased

Disc 3: Treasure Island

1. "The Rich (and The Poor)"
2. "Blue Streak"
3. "Fullsuvollivus (Fools of All of Us)"
4. "Treasure Island"
5. "Introduction and Yaqui Indian Folk Song"
6. "Le Mistral"
7. "Angles (Without Edges)"
8. "Sister Fortune"
9. "Death And The Flower" alternative take

Disc 4: Death and The Flower

1. "Death and The Flower"
2. "Prayer"
3. "Great Bird"
4. "Prayer" alternative take

Disc 5: Back Hand

1. "Inflight"
2. "Kuum"
3. "Vapallia"
4. "Backhand"
5. "Victoria" (Paul Motian) previously unreleased
