= Setting Standards: New York Sessions =

Compilation album by Keith Jarrett Trio
- Released: 2008
- Recorded: January 11–12, 1983
- Studio: Power Station (New York City)
- Genre: Jazz
- Label: ECM; ECM 2030/32
- Producer: Manfred Eicher

Setting Standards: New York Sessions is a three-CD compilation album by the Keith Jarrett Trio, featuring Jarrett on piano, Gary Peacock on bass, and Jack DeJohnette on drums. It brings together the contents of Standards, Vol. 1 (1983), Changes (1984), and Standards, Vol. 2 (1985), all of which were recorded for ECM Records at the Power Station in New York City during January 11–12, 1983. Setting Standards was released by ECM in 2008 to mark the 25th anniversary of the trio.

The album features two discs of jazz standards plus a third disc containing tracks that, with one exception, were spontaneously improvised. According to Jarrett, at a dinner with the musicians prior to the recording session, he spoke of standards as "a tribal language" and "a world of wonderful little melodies," and proposed that they record without any pre-planned arrangements. Peacock later recalled: "We went in to do just one album but we came out with enough material for three albums. They just let the tapes roll. It was incredible!"

== Reception ==
Professional ratings
Review scores
Source	Rating
AllMusic	4/5 stars
The Penguin Guide to Jazz	4/4 stars
All About Jazz	5/5 stars
All About Jazz	5/5 stars
PopMatters	8/10 stars
Tom Hull – on the Web	B+

In a review for AllMusic, Thom Jurek wrote: "these three artists know how to use these nuggets... as springboards to the most sacred and sophisticated aspect of playing jazz: improvisation. Tunes and structures are employed by Jarrett and company as a matter of tone and theme, a topical beginning from which to expand a conversation... Here was new grammar built solidly from the old, where one form of musical speech translated without misunderstanding to another."

The authors of The Penguin Guide to Jazz Recordings praised "Peacock's firmly harmonic bass and DeJohnette's imaginative drumming," and stated: "Jarrett's approach to standards is nothing if not individual; for all his obvious respect and affection for the material, he consistently goes his own way."

Budd Kopman of All About Jazz commented: "the trio... has achieved a true melding of musical minds. Every note is pregnant with meaning, every phrase dynamically moves forward and every impulse from one is answered and followed instantly by the others." AAJ's John Kelman remarked: "while there are those who see structure as an inherently limiting construct, Jarrett's trio clearly views it as liberating. Rather than defining precisely how a song should be played, form provides nothing more than a common meeting place for the trio's conversation-like interplay."

Writing for PopMatters, Will Layman stated: "Though the recordings are undeniably beautiful... they are more often freeing. The powerful low sound of Peacock, combined with DeJohnette's masterfully architectural drumming, elevates the pianist as well as his own accompaniment ever did."

In an article for Something Else!, S. Victor Aaron wrote: "It's on these recordings that Jarrett reintroduced and reinforced the idea that standards are vehicles for limitless invention. Moreover, it can be done without emptying out the heart of the tune. If you know these songs, you can locate the themes of them in any interpretation made by this group. At the same time, you'll also find that these guys play them in such a way that transcends these standards."

== Track listing ==
=== Disc 1: Standards, Vol. 1 ===
1. "Meaning of the Blues" (Bobby Troup, Leah Worth) – 9:23
2. "All the Things You Are" (Oscar Hammerstein II, Jerome Kern) – 7:44
3. "It Never Entered My Mind" (Lorenz Hart, Richard Rodgers) – 6:42
4. "The Masquerade Is Over" (Herb Magidson, Allie Wrubel) – 5:57
5. "God Bless the Child" (Arthur Herzog Jr., Billie Holiday) – 15:32

=== Disc 2: Standards, Vol. 2 ===
1. "So Tender" (Jarrett) – 7:15
2. "Moon and Sand" (William Engvick, Morty Palitz, Alec Wilder) – 8:54
3. "In Love in Vain" (Jerome Kern, Leo Robin) – 7:06
4. "Never Let Me Go" (Ray Evans, Jay Livingston) – 7:49
5. "If I Should Lose You" (Ralph Rainger, Leo Robin) – 8:28
6. "I Fall in Love Too Easily" (Sammy Cahn, Jule Styne) – 5:12

=== Disc 3: Changes ===
1. "Flying Part 1" (Keith Jarrett) – 16:03
2. "Flying Part 2" (Keith Jarrett) – 14:45
3. "Prism" (Keith Jarrett) – 6:31

== Personnel ==
- Keith Jarrett – piano
- Gary Peacock – bass
- Jack DeJohnette – drums

== Technical personnel ==
- Jan Erik Kongshaug – engineer
- Sascha Kleis – design
- Manfred Eicher – producer
- Deborah Feingold – photography
- Roberto Masotti – photography
- Peter Rüedi – liner notes (German)
- J. Bradford Robinson – liner notes (English translation)
