= Vienna Concert =

Live album by Keith Jarrett
- Released: September 1992
- Recorded: July 13, 1991
- Venue: Wiener Staatsoper; Vienna, Austria
- Length: 68:08
- Label: ECM; ECM 1481
- Producer: Manfred Eicher

Keith Jarrett chronology
The Cure (1991)	Vienna Concert (1992)	Bye Bye Blackbird (1993)

Keith Jarrett solo piano chronology
Paris Concert (1990)	Vienna Concert (1992)	La Scala (1997)

Vienna Concert is a live solo album by American jazz pianist Keith Jarrett recorded on July 13, 1991 at the Vienna State Opera in Vienna, Austria, and released by ECM September the following year.

A 2016 concert in Vienna was released in May 2025 and called New Vienna, in reference to this album.

== Reception ==
Jarrett reportedly defined it as his best concert. The AllMusic review by Richard S. Ginell awarded the album 4 stars, stating, "Jarrett's exalted judgment is close to the mark; though more Eurocentric than ever, these are his most impressive solo performances since Sun Bear." It exemplifies what has been described as ”long arcs of improvisation that characterised his earlier landmark solo piano series”.

Professional ratings
Review scores
Source	Rating
AllMusic	4/5 stars
The Penguin Guide to Jazz	3.5/4 stars

== Track listing ==
All music by Keith Jarrett

1. "Vienna, Part 1" – 42:05
2. "Vienna, Part 2" – 26:03

== Personnel ==
- Keith Jarrett – piano

=== Technical production ===
- Manfred Eicher, Keith Jarrett – producer
- Peter Laenger – recording engineer
- Barbara Wojirsch – cover design and layout
- Kuni Shinohara – photography
