= Bop-Be =

Studio album by Keith Jarrett
- Released: 1978
- Recorded: October 14–16, 1976
- Studios: Generation, New York City (USA)
- Genre: Jazz
- Length: 39:29
- Label: Impulse!
- Producer: Esmond Edwards

Keith Jarrett chronology
My Song (1978)	Bop-Be (1978)	Eyes of the Heart (1979)

Keith Jarrett American Quartet chronology
Byablue (1977)	Bop-Be (1978)	Eyes of the Heart (1979)

Bop-Be is the final album on the Impulse label by jazz pianist Keith Jarrett's American Quartet. Released in 1978, it features performances by Jarrett, Dewey Redman, Charlie Haden, and Paul Motian. Its tracks were recorded in October 1976, along with those that produced Byablue. These two albums document the swan song of Jarrett's American Quartet and, aside from classical music, the last albums Jarrett released on a label other than ECM.

A few typically reliable sources, including Ian Carr's biography and Michael Cuscuna liner notes in Silence (GRP 11172, compilation album) set these last recording sessions (Byablue and Bop-Be) either in 1975 or (September) 1977, which according to Neil Tesser and the detailed credits found in Mysteries: The Impulse Years 1975-1976 is not quite accurate.

To date, Bop-Be has only ever been reissued on compact disc in Japan, packaged in a miniature replica of the original vinyl LP sleeve. However, it was included in the four-disc collection Mysteries: The Impulse Years 1975-1976. This also applies to the Jarrett album Back Hand.

A CD issued by GRP in the early 1990s titled Silence included all but one track of this album, and five of the seven tracks from Byablue.

== Critical reception ==
Professional ratings
Review scores
Source	Rating
AllMusic	4/5 stars
Christgau's Record Guide	A

In a contemporary review for The Village Voice, music critic Robert Christgau gave the album an "A" and highlighted saxophonist Dewey Redman for his three compositions and dominant playing on what is by name only a pianist's album. The Bay State Banner opined that "Dewey Redman again sounds like a man possessed, bouncing between torrid Texas blues riffs and bizarre Chinese musette wails, while mixing in some wild loft-style solos."

In a retrospective review, AllMusic's Richard S. Ginell found it nearly as good as Byablue, Jarrett's previous album with the American Quartet. The Rolling Stone Jazz Record Guide (1985) gave it three stars.

== Track listing ==
1. "Mushi Mushi" (Redman) – 6:03
2. "Silence" (Haden) – 3:16
3. "Bop-Be" (Jarrett) – 6:59
4. "Pyramids Moving" (Redman) – 3:41
5. "Gotta Get Some Sleep" (Redman) – 10:35
6. "Blackberry Winter" (McGlohon, Wilder) – 3:38
7. "Pocket Full of Cherry" (Haden) – 5:17

== Personnel ==
- Keith Jarrett – piano, soprano saxophone, percussion
- Dewey Redman – tenor saxophone, musette
- Charlie Haden – bass
- Paul Motian – drums, percussion
