= Byablue =

Studio album by Keith Jarrett
- Released: 1977
- Recorded: October 14–16, 1976
- Studio: Generation Sound Studios, New York City (USA)
- Genre: Jazz
- Length: 42:10
- Label: Impulse!
- Producer: Esmond Edwards

Keith Jarrett chronology
Staircase (1977)	Byablue (1977)	Sun Bear Concerts (1978)

Keith Jarrett American Quartet chronology
The Survivors' Suite (1977)	Byablue (1977)	Bop-Be (1978)

Byablue is one of the last albums recorded by the so-called 'American Quartet' of jazz pianist Keith Jarrett. It was recorded in October 1976 in two sessions that also helped produce the album Bop-Be. Released on the Impulse label in 1977, it features performances by Jarrett, Dewey Redman, Charlie Haden, and Paul Motian. Musically speaking, even though the album Eyes of the Heart made it last to the market, Byablue and Bop-Be document the swan song of Jarrett's American Quartet in several ways, but most of all the inclusion of compositions by members other than Jarrett himself deliver another taste. While that did not happen before, for what would be the quartet's final recording sessions, Jarrett requested that band members contribute with their own compositions. Byablue consisted primarily of Paul Motian's pieces, while Bop-Be included Redman and Haden's contributions.

== Background: disbanding the American Quartet ==
As Neil Tesser details on his 1996 extensive notes found in the compilation album Mysteries: The Impulse Years 1975-1976 (which contains all the tracks recorded in that period, including alternate takes) the following was the story of Jarrett's American Quartet last "marathon recording sessions" taking place from December 1975 to October 1976:

(..) The first [session], in December of 1975, produced the albums Shades and Mysteries, both of them released on LP in 1976. A little less than one year later, the band returned to the studio in its working-quartet configuration -that is, minus percussionist Guilherme Franco- and recorded the tracks that became Byablue and Bop-Be. (Fifteen years later, tracks from both of these LPs were combined onto the CD reissue Silence, so named for the strikingly lovely and much-recorded Charlie Haden composition that had debuted on Bop-Be.) Also, in the spring of 1976 -in between the two sessions that make up this package- the Jarrett Quartet recorded two albums that eventually appeared on ECM Records: The Survivors Suite and Eyes of the Heart.

In scheduling these marathon recording sessions, Jarrett had a quite pragmatic purpose. "I was trying to fulfill my contract with Impulse," he explains: he felt the time had come to move on, and he owed the label four records. The first session proceeded in the same manner as his earlier recordings for the label, and both Shades and Mysteries fit comfortably ito the band's legacy. The last session does not. Jarrett says that by the time it rolled around, "I thought, 'Look, the only way to do this is to complete the job I said I'd do without being embarrassed about it.' But I knew there was a limited time because the band was coming to an end; and I also knew there wasn't the right kind of energy in the band to try anything other than programmatic changes."

== Byablue and Bop-Be: the last sessions ==
Having conversed with Keith Jarrett, on the text found in Mysteries: The Impulse Years 1975-1976 Neil Tesser transcribes a few Jarrett's reflections regarding the inclusion of musical material authored by Redman, Haden and Motian:

"All along I had wanted to give the guys more of a writing part," he says now. "I was always the one cutting across my own feelings by writing for them, and I figured that if they wrote too, I could just be in the band. So one reason this last session sounds so different has to do with my relinquishing control of the sessions. When I told them to bring in their own tunes, the underlying statement was: 'I think you feel too comfortable playing what we have here, and maybe I'm not writing the right material -so why don't you bring in some material that you would like to play?' I purposely didn't write anything for that last session because I knew I would have wanted to record those songs, and then I would have ended up directing another session."

The results stand as something unusual when placed alongside the rest of the band's work. The noticeable differences in material and in the band's performance seemed to many to signal a new direction, influenced by Motian's dreamy, almost weightless compositions, and by the de-emphasis on Jarrett's own fiercely dramatic musical ethos. At the other end of the spectrum lay the Redman tunes, each of them influenced by the airy compositional structures used by his former employer, Ornette Coleman (and sounding more like Ornette's tunes than anything Jarrett had written). Haden's contributions captured a little of both: Silence remains an especially affecting piece of purposeful languor, while his dedication to trumpeter Don Cherry reflects the work that both of them did with Ornette in the early 60s.

Tesser ends up assuming that after Byablue and Bop-Be, artistically and musically the group had already given its best: "Interesting as this experiment proved, it did not convince Jarrett that his most pessimistic assessments were misplaced. The music failed to kick-start the band into a higher orbit."

== Reception ==
Professional ratings
Review scores
Source	Rating
AllMusic	4/5 stars
The Rolling Stone Jazz Record Guide	3/5 stars

The AllMusic review by Richard S. Ginell stated, "The band certainly doesn't sound as if it was ready to break up; the interplay is telepathic, the musical ideas are still fresh, and there is a willingness to experiment. Highly recommended."

== Track listing ==
All compositions by Paul Motian except as indicated

1. "Byablue" - 7:19
2. "Konya" (Jarrett) - 3:21
3. "Rainbow" (Margot Jarrett) - 8:32
4. "Trieste" - 9:37
5. "Fantasm" - 1:12
6. "Yahllah" - 8:27
7. "Byablue" - 3:42

== Personnel ==
- Keith Jarrett - piano, soprano saxophone, percussion
- Dewey Redman - tenor saxophone, musette
- Charlie Haden - bass
- Paul Motian - drums, percussion

Production

- Esmond Edwards - producer
- Tony May - recording engineer
- Barney Perkins - remixing engineer
- Geoff Sykes - mastering engineer
- Frank Mulvey - art direction
- Philip Chiang - design
