= The Survivors' Suite =

Studio album by Keith Jarrett
- Released: 1977
- Recorded: April 1976
- Studio: Tonstudio Bauer; Ludwigsburg, W. Germany
- Genre: Jazz
- Length: 48:39
- Label: ECM 1085 ST
- Producer: Manfred Eicher

Keith Jarrett chronology
Hymns/Spheres (1976)	The Survivors' Suite (1977)	Staircase (1977)

Keith Jarrett American Quartet chronology
Shades (1976)	The Survivors' Suite (1977)	Byablue (1977)

The Survivors' Suite is an album by jazz pianist Keith Jarrett, recorded in April 1976 and released on ECM the following year. The quartet—Jarrett's "American Quartet"—features saxophonist Dewey Redman and rhythm section Charlie Haden and Paul Motian.

== Conception and composition ==
Regarding sound, venues, composition and orchestration, in a February 2009 interview conducted by Stuart Nicholson, Keith Jarrett stated that:

The whole music of The Survivors' Suite was written—and this is something that's perhaps not known widely at all— ... specifically for Avery Fisher Hall in New York, because I knew we were going to play there, I think it was opposite Monk as part of the festival. I knew from playing in Avery Fisher Hall many times the sound was not precise enough onstage to play fast tempos—[the sound] got blurred—so I decided to write the music for that evening. I felt it was important as an evening of music and that’s the first place we played it and it was written for that hall and then it became something we did at other places. So there was a rationale to that, but I think very few people would ever say, "Would you conceive, Mr. Jarrett, of writing for a specific hall?" I probably would say, "No." But the answer lies in the fact that I knew the hall to be very poor for certain kinds of things and if you listen to The Survivor’s Suite you’ll notice there are no fast tempos.

== Critical reception ==
Professional ratings
Review scores
Source	Rating
AllMusic	5/5 stars
Tom Hull	B+
The Penguin Guide to Jazz	3.5/4 stars
The Rolling Stone Jazz Record Guide	4/5 stars

Melody Maker voted the album their Jazz Album of the Year in 1978, stating: "The Survivors' Suite is a brilliantly organized and full-blooded work which provides the perfect setting for all four talents. This is a very complete record. It creates its own universe and explores it thoroughly, leaving the listener awed and satisfied... An unashamedly ardent album, Jarrett’s very finest."

Writing for the now defunct jazz magazine Jazz.com, Ted Gioia, rating the album as a single track, gave The Survivors' Suite a 97/100.

The AllMusic review by Stacia Proefrock stated, "Like other albums of its time, this was beginning to show the brightness, lightness, and soft edges of contemporary jazz, but the solidness of Haden's bass helps the music rooted and earthbound."

The Penguin Guide to Jazz by Richard Cook and Brian Morton regards the album as a "masterpiece, with the quartet pulling together on an ambitiously large-scale piece, each member contributing whole-heartedly and passionately."

== Track listing ==
All tracks are written by Keith Jarrett.

Side I
No.	Title	Length
1.	"The Survivors' Suite: Beginning"	27:21

Side II
No.	Title	Length
1.	"The Survivors' Suite: Conclusion"	21:18
Total length:		48:39

== Personnel ==
=== American Quartet ===
- Keith Jarrett – piano, soprano saxophone, bass recorder, celeste, Osi drums
- Dewey Redman – tenor saxophone, percussion
- Charlie Haden – double bass
- Paul Motian – drums, percussion

=== Technical personnel ===
- Manfred Eicher – producer
- Martin Wieland – recording engineer
- Barbara Wojirsch – layout
- Keith Jarrett – cover photography

== Liner notes ==
Quoted anonymously in the original liner notes: "And those that create out of the holocaust of their own inheritance anything more than a convenient self-made tomb shall be known as 'Survivors'."
