= The Melody at Night, with You =

Studio album by Keith Jarrett
- Released: October 1999
- Recorded: 1998
- Studio: Cavelight Studio; New Jersey
- Genre: Jazz
- Length: 55:13
- Label: ECM; ECM 1675
- Producer: Manfred Eicher, Keith Jarrett

Keith Jarrett chronology
Tokyo '96 (1998)	The Melody at Night, with You (1999)	Whisper Not (2000)

The Melody at Night, with You is a solo album by American pianist Keith Jarrett recorded at his home studio in 1998 and released on ECM October the following year.

== Background ==
It was recorded during his bout with chronic fatigue syndrome and was dedicated to Jarrett's second and then-wife, Rose Anne: "For Rose Anne, who heard the music, then gave it back to me."

In an interview in Time magazine in November 1999, he explained:

I started taping it in December 1997, as a Christmas present for my wife. I'd just had my Hamburg Steinway overhauled and wanted to try it out, and I have my studio right next to the house, so if I woke up and had a half-decent day, I would turn on the tape recorder and play for a few minutes. I was too fatigued to do more. Then something started to click with the mike placement, the new action of the instrument,... I could play so soft,... and the internal dynamics of the melodies... of the songs... It was one of those little miracles that you have to be ready for, though part of it was that I just didn't have the energy to be clever.

== Reception ==
Professional ratings
Review scores
Source	Rating
AllMusic	2.5/5 stars
DownBeat	4/5 stars
The Penguin Guide to Jazz	4/4 stars

The album was commercially successful, becoming one of the best-selling jazz instrumental albums of the 2000s, and winning a number of awards. "I Got It Bad (and That Ain't Good)" was nominated for the 2001 Grammy Award for Best Jazz Instrumental Solo.

The critical reception was more mixed, however, with some critics praising its intimacy, while others criticized its simplicity.

On the negative side, the AllMusic review by Richard S. Ginell awarded the album 2½ stars (out of 5) and states, "these performances lack color, contrast and life; and while you pull for Jarrett to summon the energy to make music again, the results are touching for a while but soon pall."

On the positive side, it was ranked the No. 2 Jazz album in the DownBeat "Critics Poll 2000", and Entertainment Weekly rated it an A.

The authors of The Penguin Guide to Jazz awarded the album 4 stars, calling it "a record of fragile magnificence, a sequence of filigreed songs from a common musical past... It is a quite simply magnificent record, swinging in a way that Jarrett has rarely before been swinging... and sweetly melodic." Writing for DownBeat, John Ephland commented: "the playing on this solo-piano recording is subdued, but does not lack for earnestness, passion or focus. The music is exquisite, unnerving and disarming, as the virtuoso bypasses flourish, instead choosing to speak plainly."

== Track listing ==
1. "I Loves You, Porgy" (George Gershwin, Ira Gershwin, Dubose Heyward) – 5:50
2. "I Got It Bad (and That Ain't Good)" (Duke Ellington, Paul Francis Webster) – 7:10
3. "Don't Ever Leave Me" (Oscar Hammerstein II, Jerome Kern) – 2:47
4. "Someone to Watch over Me" (Gershwin, Gershwin) – 5:05
5. "My Wild Irish Rose" (Traditional) – 5:21
6. "Blame It on My Youth/Meditation" (Edward Heyman, Oscar Levant/Jarrett) – 7:19
7. "Something to Remember You By" (Howard Dietz, Arthur Schwartz) – 7:15
8. "Be My Love" (Nicholas Brodszky, Sammy Cahn) – 5:38
9. "Shenandoah" (Traditional) – 5:52
10. "I'm Through with Love" (Gus Kahn, Fud Livingston, Matty Malneck) – 2:56

== Personnel ==
- Keith Jarrett – piano

=== Technical personnel ===
- Manfred Eicher – producer
- Keith Jarrett – producer, engineer
- Sascha Kleis – design
- Daniela Nowitzki – cover photography
- Rose Anne Jarrett – liner photography

== Charts ==
Chart performance for The Melody at Night, with You
Chart (2024)	Peak position
Japanese Digital Albums (Oricon)	30
Japanese Hot Albums (Billboard Japan)	76
