= Whisper Not (Keith Jarrett album) =

Live album by Keith Jarrett
- Released: October 2000
- Recorded: July 5, 1999
- Venue: Palais des congrès Paris, France
- Genre: Jazz
- Length: 1:53:10
- Label: ECM; ECM 1724/25
- Producer: Manfred Eicher

Keith Jarrett chronology
The Melody at Night, with You (1999)	Whisper Not (2000)	Inside Out (2001)

Jarrett / Peacock / DeJohnette chronology
Tokyo '96 (1998)	Whisper Not (2000)	Inside Out (2001)

Whisper Not is a live double-album by Keith Jarrett, recorded at the Palais des congrès de Paris on July 5, 1999 and released on ECM October the following year. The trio—Jarrett's "Standards Trio"—features rhythm section Gary Peacock and Jack DeJohnette.

== Reception ==
Professional ratings
Review scores
Source	Rating
AllMusic	4.5/5 stars
The Penguin Guide to Jazz	3/4 stars
DownBeat	4.5/5 stars

Writing for DownBeat, Ted Panken commented: "the pianist makes a Steinway dance buoyantly through 14 canonical tunes, conjuring free-as-the-wind melodies with effortless grace. The animating imperative here is the syntax of bebop... Unencumbered by iconic interpretations of the now vernacularized repertoire, Jarrett, Peacock and DeJohnette impart to their statements the improvising-from-point-zero approach that is their trademark; they avoid cliché while retaining idiomatic nuances of phrasing and swing that define the form and make it live. All in all, a stimulating paean to the rejuvenating powers of improvisation by one of the supreme communicators in jazz."

The authors of The Penguin Guide to Jazz wrote: "this was a celebratory occasion... one of the first times when Jarrett seemed clear of the chronic fatigue that had afflicted him over the previous two years... one is struck more by the renewed interest in bebop than concerned that there seems to be a slight, almost subliminal dulling of his articulation and phrasing... Peacock and DeJohnette are both in magisterial form... Our nominations for immortality from this set would be 'What Is This Thing Called Love?' and a magnificent 'Poinciana.'"

The AllMusic review by Richard S. Ginell awarded the album 4½ stars and states, "even those who think they have enough material by this group will be rightly tempted to invest in this document of Jarrett's resurrection."

Gary Giddins remarked: "When Jarrett, Peacock, and Jack DeJohnette lift off at medium-up tempos, they create their own orbit. 'Bouncing with Bud,' 'Groovin’ High,' and 'What Is This Thing Called Love?' are spectacular, as are the encores."

== Track listing ==
1. "Bouncing with Bud" (Bud Powell) - 7:33
2. "Whisper Not" (Benny Golson) - 8:06
3. "Groovin' High" (Dizzy Gillespie) - 8:31
4. "Chelsea Bridge" (Billy Strayhorn) - 9:47
5. "Wrap Your Troubles in Dreams (and Dream Your Troubles Away)" (Harry Barris, Ted Koehler, Billy Moll) - 5:48
6. "'Round Midnight" (Thelonious Monk) - 6:45
7. "Sandu" (Clifford Brown) - 7:26
8. "What Is This Thing Called Love?" (Cole Porter) - 12:24
9. "Conception" (George Shearing) - 8:08
10. "Prelude to a Kiss" (Duke Ellington, Irving Gordon, Irving Mills) - 8:16
11. "Hallucinations" (Powell) - 6:36
12. "All My Tomorrows" (Sammy Cahn, Jimmy Van Heusen) - 6:23
13. "Poinciana" (Nat Simon, Buddy Bernier) - 9:11
14. "When I Fall in Love" (Edward Heyman, Victor Young) - 8:06

== Personnel ==
- Keith Jarrett – piano
- Gary Peacock – bass
- Jack DeJohnette – drums

=== Technical personnel ===
- Manfred Eicher – producer
- Gérard Drouot – concert producer
- Martin Pearson – recording engineer
- Sascha Kleis – design
