= Changes (Keith Jarrett album) =

Studio album by Keith Jarrett
- Released: September 1984
- Recorded: January 11–12, 1983
- Venue: Power Station, New York City
- Genre: Jazz
- Length: 37:25
- Label: ECM 1276
- Producer: Manfred Eicher

Keith Jarrett chronology
Standards, Vol. 1 (1983)	Changes (1984)	Standards, Vol. 2 (1985)

Jarrett / Peacock / DeJohnette chronology
Standards, Vol. 1 (1983)	Changes (1984)	Standards, Vol. 2 (1985)

Changes is an album by American jazz pianist Keith Jarrett recorded over two days in January 1983 and released on ECM September the following year. The trio features rhythm section Gary Peacock and Jack DeJohnette, the second release by the long-standing "Standards Trio", the first three of which—Standards, Vol. 1 (1983), Changes and Standards, Vol. 2 (1985)—were all recorded concurrently.

In 2008 the three albums were collected into a boxed set, Setting Standards: New York Sessions.

== Background ==
Keith Jarrett, Gary Peacock and Jack DeJohnette had originally worked together on Peacock's 1977 album Tales of Another. In 1983, they came back together after producer Manfred Eicher proposed a trio album to Jarrett. The three joined in a studio in Manhattan, New York for a roughly 2-day session during which they recorded enough material for three albums, the two Standards volumes and Changes, without rehearsing or pre-planning the playlist.

The track "Prism" had been part of the repertoire of Jarrett's "European quartet" in the late 1970s. Two separate recordings of the European quartet playing the song in 1979 were later released: one on the 1989 album Personal Mountains, and one on the 2012 album Sleeper.

== Original notes ==
The austere and minimalist designs of Jarrett albums' layouts on ECM (a label's trademark) are sometimes filled with notes, poems, quotes or even long stories. In the original 1984 ECM LP and CD issues this Rilke poem can be found:

If I don’t manage to fly, someone else will.
The Spirit wants only that there be flying.
As for who happens to do it,
in that he has only a passing interest.

— Rainer Maria Rilke

== Reception ==
The AllMusic review by Scott Yanow stated: "Unlike the other two Keith Jarrett trio recordings from January 1983, this collaboration with bassist Gary Peacock and drummer Jack DeJohnette does not feature standards. The trio performs the 30-minute 'Flying' and a 6-minute 'Prism', both of them Jarrett originals. 'Flying', which has several sections, keeps one's interest throughout while the more concise 'Prism' has a beautiful melody. It is a nice change to hear Jarrett (who normally plays unaccompanied) interacting with a trio of superb players."

Professional ratings
Review scores
Source	Rating
AllMusic	4/5 stars
The Penguin Guide to Jazz	3/4 stars
The Rolling Stone Jazz Record Guide	3/5 stars

== Track listing ==
All music by Keith Jarrett.

1. "Flying Part 1" - 16:06
2. "Flying Part 2" - 13:38
3. "Prism" - 6:31

== Personnel ==
Standards Trio

- Keith Jarrett – piano
- Jack DeJohnette – drums
- Gary Peacock – double bass

Production

- Manfred Eicher – producer
- Jan Erik Kongshaug – recording engineer
- Barbara Wojirsch – cover design and layout
