= Flights of Fancy: Trio Fascination Edition Two =

Studio album by Joe Lovano
- Released: March 13, 2001
- Recorded: June 14 & 16, 2000
- Genre: Jazz
- Length: 67:47
- Label: Blue Note
- Producer: Joe Lovano

Joe Lovano chronology
Grand Slam: Live at the Regatta Bar (2000)	Flights of Fancy: Trio Fascination Edition Two (2001)	Fourth World (2001)

Flights of Fancy: Trio Fascination: Edition Two is an album by the American jazz saxophonist Joe Lovano recorded in 2000 and released on the Blue Note label. The album is a sequel to Lovano's Trio Fascination: Edition One (1998) but, unlike the earlier album which featured a conventional sax-bass-drums lineup, Edition Two finds Lovano shifting between four different and often eclectic trio configurations.

== Reception ==
The AllMusic review by David R. Adler awarded the album 4 stars, stating: "Taking the trio concept beyond the traditional confines of horn, bass, and drums, Lovano takes a left turn and colors this album with continually changing instrumentation... Fans looking for more of the hard-driving, free-spirited swing of the first Trio Fascination record will find it here in smaller doses. And those who got their first taste of Lovano with 2000's neo-bop nonet record 52nd Street Themes ought to be prepared for something very different."

Professional ratings
Review scores
Source	Rating
AllMusic	4/5 stars
Tom Hull	B
The Penguin Guide to Jazz Recordings	3/4 stars

== Track listing ==
All compositions by Joe Lovano except as indicated

1. "Flights of Fancy" - 6:22
2. "On April (I'll Remember April)" (Gene de Paul, Patricia Johnston, Don Raye) - 3:31
3. "Amsterdam" - 4:36
4. "Blue Mist" - 4:26
5. "Off and Runnin'" - 4:01
6. "Infant Eyes" (Wayne Shorter) - 6:26
7. "206" - 6:35
8. "Bougainvillea" (Judi Silvano) - 8:00
9. "Windom Street" - 4:52
10. "Hot Shot" - 4:42
11. "Aisha" (McCoy Tyner) - 3:56
12. "Amber" - 3:09
13. "On Giant Steps" (John Coltrane) - 5:46
14. "Flights of Fancy (Reprise)" - 1:25

== Personnel ==
- Joe Lovano – tenor saxophone, alto saxophone, soprano saxophone, alto clarinet, drums, percussion, gong

in trios with:

- Idris Muhammad (drums) and Cameron Brown (bass)
- Billy Drewes (soprano saxophone, alto flute) and Joey Baron (drums)
- Toots Thielemans (harmonica) and Kenny Werner (piano)
- Dave Douglas (trumpet) and Mark Dresser (bass)
