= Bird Songs (Joe Lovano album) =

Studio album by Joe Lovano Us Five
- Released: 2011
- Recorded: September 7–8, 2010
- Genre: Jazz
- Length: 65:04
- Label: Blue Note
- Producer: Joe Lovano

Joe Lovano chronology
Folk Art (2009)	Bird Songs (2011)	Cross Culture (2013)

Professional ratings
Aggregate scores
Source	Rating
Metacritic	84/100
Review scores
Source	Rating
AllMusic	3.5/5 stars
All About Jazz	5/5 stars
The Boston Phoenix	3.5/4 stars
Entertainment Weekly	B+
The Guardian	5/5 stars
Los Angeles Times	3/4 stars
Mojo	4/5 stars
musicOMH	4/5 stars
PopMatters	7/10
Tom Hull	B+

Bird Songs is the 22nd album by Joe Lovano released via the Blue Note label in 2011. The album features Esperanza Spalding, James Weidman, Otis Brown III and Francisco Mela performing songs mostly written or performed by alto saxophonist Charlie Parker.

== Reception ==
Chris Barton of Los Angeles Times stated "Though a showcase for history, Lovano and his band expertly show the many ways these classics can still throw sparks". John Fordham of The Guardian noted "less capricious than Django Bates's tribute to Charlie Parker last year, but just as inspired and rich in references, Joe Lovano's Bird Songs is not just a stunning celebration of Parker's music, but a salute to the sax giants – Sonny Rollins, Dexter Gordon, Ornette Coleman and Wayne Shorter – who were liberated by it". Phil Johnson of The Independent added "It's an homage to Charlie Parker, but not, says Lovano, a tribute record. Rather, Parker's music is approached from a post-Coltrane, post-free jazz aesthetic, with the rhythmic edginess of bebop elided into an all-the-time-in-the-world fluidity. A masterpiece".

== Track listing ==
All compositions by Charlie Parker except as indicated

1. "Passport" – 5:27
2. "Donna Lee" – 4:30
3. "Barbados" – 6:19
4. "Moose the Mooche" – 6:34
5. "Loverman" (Jimmy Davis, Roger "Ram" Ramirez, James Sherman) – 9:03
6. "Birdyard" (Joe Lovano) – 1:47
7. "Ko Ko" – 6:20
8. "Blues Collage (Carvin' the Bird–Bird Feathers–Bloomdido)" – 1:52
9. "Dexterity" – 2:49
10. "Dewey Square" – 8:25
11. "Yardbird Suite" – 11:58

== Personnel ==
- Joe Lovano - saxophone
- Esperanza Spalding - bass
- James Weidman - piano
- Otis Brown III - drums, percussion
- Francisco Mela - drums, percussion
