= Paramount Quartet =

Studio album by Joe Lovano
- Released: May 29, 2026
- Recorded: February 2025
- Studio: Studios La Buissonne
- Genre: Jazz
- Length: 44:02
- Label: ECM; 241251 LP / 240452 CD
- Producer: Manfred Eicher

Joe Lovano chronology
Homage (2025)	Paramount Quartet (2026)

Paramount Quartet is a studio album by American jazz saxophonist Joe Lovano, released by ECM Records on May 29, 2026. It features Lovano in a quartet, the Paramount Quartet, with guitarist Julian Lage, bassist Asante Santi Debriano, and drummer Will Calhoun. This quartet traces back to a Puerto Rico relief fund event, where Lovano met Debriano and Calhoun; Lage was added later, of which Lovano called the "missing angle" to the group. They had performed dates prior, playing at the Kennedy Center in its 2024–2025 jazz season, the La Jolla Music Society in San Diego, and the 2025 Big Ears Festival.

== Reception ==
Professional ratings
Review scores
Source	Rating
All About Jazz (Dan McClenaghan)	4/5 stars
All About Jazz (Sue Yang)	4/5 stars
DownBeat	4/5 stars
The Guardian	4/5 stars
UK Vibe	5/5 stars

For All About Jazz, Dan McClenaghan wrote, "Hints of Americana emerge, along with a subtle feeling of experiencing the sacred [...] he [Lovano] sounds like an artist who is supremely comfortable in his own skin with his writing and playing; it might be a 'I am in the groove with nothing left to prove' thing." For the same publication, Sue Yang explained, "Paramount Quartet does not sound like a studio construction assembled for contrast. It sounds like a group formed from contact: old associations, new pressure, and a leader willing to let the balance move."

Michael J. West of DownBeat magazine stated, "the musicians on this new recording [...] can maintain such exquisite sensitivity in their interactions, even while all four of them are practically bursting with creative energy".

The Guardian's John Fordham summed "Lovano and his spirited quartet make his instrument glow in all its pliable eloquence, with rattling originals amid the Charlie Haden and Wayne Shorter covers".

PostGenre called it "a delightful, unpredictable listen that both comforts and thrills".

A review by The Big Takeover called the album "Less dense than Lovano's nineties combos, but also less ethereal than his recent work leading Trio Tapestry", that it "trims the fat and works the muscle of its bop-based modern jazz."

UK Vibe was highly complimentary of the ensemble's collaboration: "Lovano has always excelled at assembling bands that sound natural, as if their collective journey was meant to bring them to this place right at this very moment in time, and this quartet may be among his most intuitive."

== Track listing ==
All tracks are written by Joe Lovano except where noted.

No.	Title	Writer(s)	Length
1.	"First Song"	Charlie Haden; Abbey Lincoln	7:24
2.	"Amsterdam"		6:30
3.	"The Call"		5:44
4.	"Fanfare for Unity"		4:11
5.	"Lady Day"	Wayne Shorter	7:59
6.	"The Great Outdoors"		6:38
7.	"Congregation"		5:36
Total length:			44:02

- Recorded at Studios La Buissonne, Pernes-les-Fontaines, France, in February 2025

== Personnel ==
Musicians

- Joe Lovano – tenor saxophone, G mezzo-soprano saxophone, tárogatós
- Julian Lage – guitar
- Asante Santi Debriano – double bass
- Will Calhoun – drums

Technical

- Manfred Eicher – producer
- Gérard De Haro – recording engineer
- Nicolas Baillard – mastering
- Sascha Kleis – design
- Sam Harfouche – photography

== Charts ==
=== Monthly charts ===
Monthly chart performance for Paramount Quartet
Chart (2026)	Peak position
German Jazz Albums (Offizielle Top 100)	9
