= Classic! Live at Newport =

Live album by Joe Lovano
- Released: July 29, 2016
- Recorded: August 14, 2005
- Venue: Newport Jazz Festival
- Genre: Jazz
- Length: 57:47
- Label: Blue Note 0602547950383
- Producer: George Wein

Joe Lovano chronology
Sound Prints (2015)	Classic! Live at Newport (2016)	Trio Tapestry (2019)

Professional ratings
Review scores
Source	Rating
Allmusic	4/5 stars
PopMatters	7/10 stars
Tom Hull	B+

Classic! Live at Newport is a live album by American jazz saxophonist Joe Lovano recorded in 2005 during the 51st Newport Jazz Festival and released on July 29, 2016 via Blue Note label. This is the 25th and final album in his Blue Note catalog.

== Background ==
Lovano dedicated the album to the memory of both the pianist Hank Jones and longtime Blue Note president Bruce Lundvall. The six-tune recording features musical material drawn from the studio albums that Lovano recorded with Jones in 2004–2005. Lovano initially assembled his quartet with Jones, George Mraz and Paul Motian in 2004 to record I'm All For You. The record saw critical success, and the quartet returned to the studio to record the Joyous Encounter, which was released in May 2005. That summer, Classic! Live at Newport was recorded with Lewis Nash replacing Motian. On his website Lovano mentioned that this was his final album for the Blue Note label.

== Reception ==
Hrayr Attarian of Chicago Jazz Magazine noted "It took 11 years for saxophonist Joe Lovano’s superb live recording from the 51st Newport Jazz festival to be released. During these years, the world lost the ingenious pianist Hank Jones, who makes the resulting album Classic! Live at Newport all the more poignant. The disc is the fourth documented collaboration between Lovano and Jones and is as intriguing as the others, yet unique in its unbridled energy and lively spontaneity....This splendid disc not only captures an exciting and stimulating concert, it also renders it impeccably and with vivid sound. Listening to it is certainly not a substitute for the actual attendance of this memorable event, but Classic! does allow for repeated enjoyment of the work of a quartet captured at the height of its creative power."

John Paul of PopMatters wrote that "Classic! Live at Newport offers little in the way of new or unexpected turns from any of these performers. Instead it serves as a fine reminder of the strengths of each and a fitting showcase for the link between jazz’s old and new guard, Lovano falling squarely in the middle. Fans of straight-ahead jazz and thrilling live performances will find much to like here".

== Track listing ==
No.	Title	Writer(s)	Length
1.	"Big Ben"	Lovano	7:11
2.	"Bird's Eye View"	Lovano	11:06
3.	"Don't Ever Leave Me"	Thad Jones	10:23
4.	"I'm All for You"	Lovano	9:54
5.	"Kids Are Pretty People"	Thad Jones	8:09
6.	"Six and Four"	Oliver Nelson	11:04
Total length:			57:47

== Personnel ==
Band

- Hank Jones – piano
- Joe Lovano – tenor saxophone
- George Mraz – bass
- Lewis Nash – drums

Production

- John Abbott – photography
- Mike Joyce – design
- Joe Lovano – producer
- Kurt Lundvall – engineer, mastering, mixing
- George Wein – producer
- Judi Silvano – cover art
