= Dick Oatts =

American jazz musician, composer, and educator

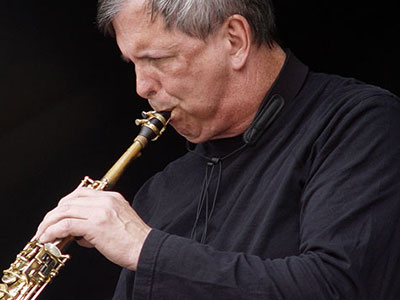
- In Aarhus, Denmark (2012)

Background information
- Born: Richard Dennis Oatts; April 2, 1953 (age 73); Des Moines, Iowa, U.S.
- Genres: Jazz
- Occupations: Musician, composer, educator
- Instruments: Saxophone, flute, clarinet, piano
- Years active: 1972–present
- Labels: Steeplechase, DMP
- Website: dickoattsmusic.com

Richard Dennis Oatts (born April 2, 1953) is an American jazz saxophonist, multi-instrumentalist, composer, and educator.

== Biography ==
While growing up in Des Moines, Iowa, Oatts gained an interest in music from his father, Jack Oatts, who was a saxophonist himself and a respected music educator in the Midwest. After graduating from Jefferson High School, which is now known as Greene County High School, in 1971 at Jefferson, Iowa, Oatts attended Drake University for one year before dropping out and moving to Minneapolis to begin a career in music in 1972. In 1977, he was called by Thad Jones to join The Thad Jones/Mel Lewis Orchestra, which later became the Vanguard Jazz Orchestra. Oatts moved to New York City to join the band, and began playing Monday nights with Jones and Lewis at the Village Vanguard, as well as touring in Europe with them. Oatts played with Vanguard Jazz Orchestra for 48 years before retiring in November 2025.

Oatts' work on woodwind instruments (saxophone, clarinet, flute) became more widely known when he led the crossover jazz group Flim & the BB's in the 1980s and '90s with bassist Jimmy "Flim" Johnson, drummer Bill Berg, and keyboardist Billy Barber.

Since the 1970s, Oatts has released more than a dozen albums as a leader and co-leader, and he has appeared on over 100 albums as a sideman with Joe Henderson, Jerry Bergonzi, Eddie Gómez, Bob Brookmeyer, the Vanguard Jazz Orchestra, Joe Lovano and others, working extensively with Steeplechase Records. He has also accompanied Joe Williams, Sarah Vaughan, Mel Tormé, and Ella Fitzgerald.

Oatts has taught at the Manhattan School of Music and has been artist-in-residence at the Amsterdam Conservatory. In 2006, he became a professor and artistic director of the jazz studies department at Temple University in Philadelphia.

== Discography ==
=== As a leader or co-leader ===
- 1990: Dial and Oatts (DMP) with Garry Dial
- 1990: Brassworks (DMP) with Garry Dial
- 1997: All of Three (Steeplechase)
- 1999: Standard Issue Vol. 1 (Steeplechase)
- 2000: Simone's Dance (Steeplechase)
- 2000: Standard Issue Vol. 2 (Steeplechase)
- 2000: Meru (Steeplechase) with the Dave Santoro Quartet
- 2001: South Paw (Steeplechase)
- 2006: Jam Session, Vol. 18 (Steeplechase) with Billy Drewes & Walt Weiskopf
- 2008: Gratitude (Steeplechase)
- 2009: Saxology (Steeplechase) with Jerry Bergonzi
- 2010: Two Hearts (Steeplechase)
- 2010: The Clouds Above (Audial) with Soren Moller
- 2011: Bridging the Gap (Planet Arts) with Terell Stafford
- 2011: Black Nile (Radiosnj) with Cameron Brown, Lorenzo Lombardo, & Gary Versace
- 2012: Lookin' Up (Steeplechase)
- 2014: Sweet Nowhere (Steeplechase) with Harold Danko
- 2018: Use Your Imagination (Steeplechase)

=== As a sideman ===
With Thad Jones/Mel Lewis

- 1978: It Only Happens Every Time
- 1978: One More Time
- 1979: Naturally
- 1980: Bob Brookmeyer – Composer & Arranger
- 1981: Mellifluous (Gatemouth) - Mel Lewis Quintet
- 1981: Live in Montreux
- 1982: Make Me Smile & Other New Works by Bob Brookmeyer
- 1985: 20 Years at the Village Vanguard
- 1988: Live at the Village Vanguard
- 1988: Definitive Thad Jones, Vol. 2: Live from the Village Vanguard
- 1988: Soft Lights and Hot Music
- 1989: Lost Art
- 1991: To You: A Tribute to Mel Lewis
- 1993: Body and Soul
- 2008: Definitive Thad Jones: Live from the Village Vanguard

With Vanguard Jazz Orchestra

- 1997: Lickety Split: The Music of Jim McNeely
- 1999: Thad Jones Legacy
- 2002: Can I Persuade You
- 2004: The Way: Music of Slide Hampton
- 2007: Up From the Skies: Music of Jim McNeely
- 2008: Monday Night Live at the Village Vanguard
- 2011: Forever Lasting: Live in Tokyo

With Flim & the BBs

- 1978: Flim & the BBs
- 1982: Tricycle
- 1984: Tunnel
- 1985: Big Notes
- 1987: Neon
- 1988: The Further Adventures of Flim & the BBs
- 1990: New Pants
- 1991: Vintage BBs
- 1992: This is a Recording

With Red Rodney

- 1986: No Turn On Red
- 1988: Red Snapper

With Ray Mantilla

- 1984: Hands of Fire
- 1988: Dark Powers
- 1986: Synergy

With Colors of Jazz

- 1991: From Hollywood
- 1991: For Tropical Nights
- 1991: For Sunday Morning
- 1991: From Dusk Till Dawn

With Everything but the Girl

- 1991: Worldwide
- 1992: Acoustic
- 2013: The Language of Life

With Armen Donelian

- 1988: Secrets
- 1990: Wayfarer

With Susannah McCorkle

- 1993: From Bessie to Brazil
- 1994: From Broadway to Bebop
- 1999: From Broken Hearts to Blue Skies
- 2000: Hearts and Minds

With Joe Lovano

- 1995: Rush Hour
- 1996: Celebrating Sinatra
- 2002: Viva Caruso

With Nnenna Freelon

- 1998: Maiden Voyage
- 1994: Listen

With Ted Rosenthal

- 1992: Images of Monk
- 2003: Expressions

With Eddie Gómez

- 1988: Power Play
- 2008: Street Smart

With Gary Smulyan

- 1993: Saxophone Mosaic
- 2009: High Noon: The Jazz Soul of Frankie Laine

With others

- 1981: Through a Looking Glass – Bob Brookmeyer
- 1983: Impressions of Charles Mingus – Teo Macero
- 1987: Initial Thrill – Kenia
- 1989: Kaleidoscope – Bill Mays
- 1989: Code Red – Code Red
- 1989: Wilderness – Bob Thompson
- 1991: So Intense – Lisa Fischer
- 1991: The Road Not Taken – Stefan Karlsson
- 1991: Ricky Peterson – Smile Blue
- 1992: Still in Love With You – Meli'sa Morgan
- 1992: Awakening – Bud Shank
- 1992: The Moment – Yoshio Suzuki
- 1992: Uh–Oh – David Byrne
- 1992: Play–cation – Allen Farnham
- 1992: Dial & Oatts Play Cole Porter – Garry Dial
- 1993: View From Manhattan – Hendrik Meurkens
- 1994: Heatin' System – Jack McDuff
- 1994: Bite of the Apple – Peter Delano
- 1995: This is Christmas – Luther Vandross
- 1995: Manhattan Moods – Mary Stallings
- 1995: Annette Lowman – Annette Lowman
- 1995: I Was Born In Love With You – Denise Jannah
- 1996: Portraits of Cuba – Paquito D'Rivera
- 1996: Big Band – Joe Henderson
- 1997: Ruben Gomez – Rubén Gómez
- 1997: This Is Living! – Tom Talbert Orchestra
- 1998: Tropic Heat – Dave Valentin
- 1999: Souvenir – Ricky Peterson
- 2001: Group Therapy – Jim McNeely
- 2002: Leaving Home – David Berkman
- 2002: Pasajes – Jim Brock
- 2003: New Beginnings – Terell Stafford
- 2004: Start Here... Finish There – David Berkman
- 2004: Mean What You Say – Temple University Jazz Band
- 2005: Echoes in the Night – Earl MacDonald
- 2006: Oatts & Perry – Harold Danko
- 2004: Let Yourself Go – Judi Silvano
- 2006: Many Places – Gary Versace
- 2007: Truth Is – Steve Million
- 2007: Taking a Chance on Love – Simone Kopmaje
- 2008: Runnin' in the Meadow – Michael Deacon
- 2009: Walking on Air – Linda Baker
- 2010: Oatts and Perry, Vol. 2 – Harold Danko
- 2010: Homage – Stockholm Jazz Orchestra
- 2010: Canopus – JazzNord Ensemble
- 2011: At This Time – Norman David
- 2011: Don't Look Back – Jane Stuart
- 2011: Jazzing Vol. 3 – Sant Andreu Jazz Band
- 2011: Legacy – Gerald Wilson Orchestra
- 2014: We See Stars – Jim Olsen Ensemble
- 2014: Intersecting Lines – Jerry Bergonzi
- 2015: Jazzing Vol. 5 – Sant Andreu Jazz Band
- 2017: Life Changes -- Brian Eisenberg Jazz Orchestra
