= Symphonica =

Symphonica may refer to:

- Symphonica (Ruins album), 1998
- Symphonica (Joe Lovano album), 2009
- Symphonica (George Michael album), 2014
- Symphonica Tour, an orchestral concert tour by George Michael
- Symphonica (game), a 2012 iOS video game
