= Folk Art (album) =

Studio album by Joe Lovano Us Five
- Released: May 5, 2009
- Recorded: November 18–19, 2008
- Studios: Sear Sound, New York City
- Genres: Jazz, post-bop
- Length: 1:04:40
- Label: Blue Note
- Producer: Joe Lovano

Joe Lovano Us Five chronology
Symphonica (2008)	Folk Art (2009)	Bird Songs (2011)

Professional ratings
Aggregate scores
Source	Rating
Metacritic	84/100
Review scores
Source	Rating
Allmusic	4.5/5 stars
The Guardian	4/5 stars
PopMatters	8/10
Sputnikmusic	4.5/5
Tom Hull	B+

Folk Art is the twenty-first studio album by American saxophonist Joe Lovano, released on Blue Note Records in 2009. The album was well received by critics, scoring 84% from six reviews aggregated by Metacritic.

== Overview ==
For the recording of Folk Art Lovano formed a new band he called Us Five, featuring Esperanza Spalding on bass and pianist James Weidman. Francisco Mela and Otis Brown III (two drummers) completed the unusual quintet. It was the first album with compositions exclusively written by Lovano. With the liberated spirit of the 1960s avant-garde and the subsequent loft scene in mind, the interpretations ought to be "loose and joyous".

== Reception ==
John Fordham of The Guardian noted "It's Lovano's 21st album for Blue Note - and one of his freest, letting group relations go where they will. The melodies are full of character: the wheeling theme of the title track unfolds over a piano vamp, with an eerie, nursery rhyme-like motif as the countermelody... Lovano pulls no punches here, but his lyrical instincts are also strong; Folk Art remains as accessible as its title implies it ought to be". Ben Ratliff of The New York Times commented "“Folk Art” might be his woolliest album. It's a bit out of focus, perhaps intentionally. Made with his new band, Us Five, it's sketchy, groovy and a little burdensome. The album isn't set up as a reference to any one composer, style or period, but we’re strangely deep into the early 1970s here". Will Layman of PopMatters commented "At this stage of the game, Joe Lovano's name guarantees a certain level of quality in jazz. His boundless imagination has promised great playing, but it has also generated a somewhat restless recording career, with a different band or approach on nearly every recording. With Us Five, Lovano has found a flexible and exciting working band, a group that can play down the center or off on the side, that can swing joyously or reach for the heights of abstraction. Here's hoping that Lovano and Blue Note love this band as much as it deserves to be loved. More please".

== Track listing ==
All tracks are written by Joe Lovano.

Standard Edition
No.	Title	Length
1.	"Powerhouse"	4:04
2.	"Folk Art"	10:06
3.	"Wild Beauty"	7:17
4.	"Us Five"	8:09
5.	"Song for Judi"	5:46
6.	"Drum Song"	8:30
7.	"Dibango"	6:44
8.	"Page 4"	5:52
9.	"Ettenro"	8:12
Total length:		01:04:40

== Personnel ==
- Joe Lovano - alto and tenor saxophone, alto clarinet, taragat, gong
- James Weidman - piano
- Esperanza Spalding - bass
- Otis Brown III - drums, bells
- Francisco Mela - drums, bells, dumbek, pandeiro
