= Rubato International Piano Competition =

International Piano Competition

The Rubato International Piano Competition is a piano competition held annually at the Oxford Performing Arts Center in Oxford, Alabama, beginning in 2022. The competition is the first international piano competition in Alabama, attracting contenders from many countries in part due to its unique integration of the categories of classical and jazz music in a single competition.

As a portion of the competition, semi-finalists engage in master classes with the judges. The founder, Julio Barreto, is an Argentinian pianist; his intention for the competition is to "build an international relationship for the city, county and state." The Rubato is supported by the city of Oxford, the Oxford Performing Arts Center, and is underwritten by several donors; the competition features pianos from Steinway Piano. The semi-final and final rounds of the competition are performed live in front of an audience at the Arts Center and is streamed online. It awards $24,000 in prize money, with a first prize of $5,000, second prize of $2,500, and audience favorite prize of $500. An Honorable Mention prize was added at the competition. The competition is divided into three categories: Classical Division Level A, for pianists 12–18 years of age; Classical Division Level B, for pianists 19–26 years of age; and Jazz Division, for pianists 12–26 years of age.

The judges for the inaugural classical piano competition were Yakov Kasman of the University of Alabama at Birmingham and Van Cliburn Piano Competition medalist; Luis Sanchez of Texas A&M and the Frances Clark Center for Piano Pedagogy, and Janet Landreth, professor emerita of Colorado State University and a Steinway Teacher Hall of Fame inductee. The judges for the inaugural jazz piano competition were James Weidman of the University of Georgia, Jeremy Siskind of Fullerton College, and Leonardo Blanco of the Berklee College of Music.

== Prize winners ==
=== Classical Piano division for 12–18 years ===
Year	1st Prize	2nd Prize	Audience Favorite	Honorable Mention
2022	(United States) Harrison Benford	(United States) Michelle Nieto	(United States) Raditya Muljadi	(United States) Matthew Liu

=== Classical Piano division for 19–26 years ===
Year	1st Prize	2nd Prize	Audience Favorite	Honorable Mention
2022	(China) Shangru Du	(China) Kun Ding	(Australia) Anna Li	(China) Zhengyi Huang

=== Jazz Piano division for 12–26 years ===
Year	1st Prize	2nd Prize	Audience Favorite	Honorable Mention
2022	(Thailand) Warit Techakanont	(United States) Bromme "Bix" Cole II	(Ecuador) Simon Martinez	(United States) Beck Vontver
