= Worlds (Joe Lovano album) =

Live album by Joe Lovano
- Released: 1989
- Recorded: May 5, 1989
- Venue: 8th Amiens International Jazz Festival at Le Grand Théâtre de la Maison de la Culture d'Amiens
- Genre: Jazz
- Length: 56:46
- Label: Label Bleu LBLC 6524 HM 83

Joe Lovano chronology
Village Rhythm (1988)	Worlds (1989)	Landmarks (1990)

Alternative cover
- Evidence Music cover

Professional ratings
Review scores
Source	Rating
Allmusic	4/5 stars
The Encyclopedia of Popular Music	2/5 stars
Tom Hull	B

Worlds is a live 1989 album by American jazz musician Joe Lovano. The album was recorded at the Amiens International Jazz Festival in France. The record was initially released in 1989 via Label Bleu in France and then re-released via Evidence Music in 1995 in the United States.

== Track listing ==
No.	Title	Writer(s)	Length
1.	"Worlds"	Lovano	8:46
2.	"Round Dance"	Joe Lovano	9:49
3.	"Tafabalewa Square"	Lovano	12:20
4.	"Two Hearts"	Kenny Werner, Judi Silvano	7:10
5.	"Spirit of the Night"	Lovano, Silvano	9:29
6.	"Lutetia"	Lovano, Silvano	2:51
7.	"Boss Town"	Lovano, Silvano	6:21
Total length:			56:46

== Personnel ==
Band

- Joe Lovano – tenor and soprano saxophone, alto clarinet
- Bill Frisell – guitar
- Tim Hagans – trumpet
- Gary Valente – trombone
- Judi Silverman – soprano vocals
- Henri Texier – double bass
- Paul Motian – drums

Production

- Bruno Menny – engineer
- Alain Marnat – editing
- Michel Orier – executive producer
- Martine Patrice – assistant producer
- Bob Brookmeyer – liner notes
- Guy Le Querrec – photography
