= Streams of Expression =

Studio album by Joe Lovano
- Released: August 1, 2006
- Recorded: December 13–14, 2005
- Studio: Avatar, New York City
- Genre: Jazz
- Length: 1:13:54
- Label: Blue Note
- Producer: Joe Lovano

Joe Lovano chronology
Joyous Encounter (2005)	Streams of Expression (2006)	Kids: Live at Dizzy's Club Coca-Cola (2007)

Professional ratings
Review scores
Source	Rating
All About Jazz	4.5/5 stars
Allmusic	4/5 stars
The Guardian	5/5 stars
PopMatters	7/10 stars
Tom Hull	B+
The Penguin Guide to Jazz Recordings	3.5/4 stars

Streams of Expression is the 20th studio album by American jazz musician Joe Lovano to be released on the Blue Note label. It was released in 2006 and features a five-part "Streams of Expression Suite," three-part "Birth of the Cool Suite," and three other shorter works. The "Birth of the Cool Suite" was conducted by Gunther Schuller and utilizes melodic themes inspired by Miles Davis' work from his 1948 and 1950 nonet. The album also features George Garzone, Ralph Lalama, Gary Smulyan, and Tim Hagans.

== Reception ==
Steve Greenlee of JazzTimes stated "This disc can be considered something of a sequel to 1995’s Rush Hour, which stands among Lovano’s very best... The music is interesting enough, especially when Lovano solos, but this is not a disc that will find itself in my CD changer often... It is Lovano’s original suite that constitutes the better portion of this album. John Fordham of The Guardian commented "This could have been a legacy-jazz homage that simply polished the glossy surfaces of these timeless pieces, but Lovano and Schuller have chosen to look both back at the genre's pre-bop roots and forward to the free-jazz it helped release".

== Track listing ==
1. "Streams of Expression: Streams, Pt. 1" - 10:53
2. "Streams of Expression: Cool, Pt. 2" - 7:02
3. "The Birth of the Cool Suite: Prelude/Moon Dreams" - 6:40
4. "The Birth of the Cool Suite: Interlude No. 1/Move/Interlude No. 2" - 8:05
5. "The Birth of the Cool Suite: Boplicity/Postlude" - 5:29
6. "Blue Sketches" - 4:52
7. "Buckeyes" - 9:30
8. "Streams of Expression: Enchantment, Pt. 3" - 3:41
9. "Streams of Expression: Second Nature, Pt. 4" - 6:00
10. "Streams of Expression: The Fire Prophets, Pt. 5" - 6:55
11. "Big Ben" - 4:47

== Personnel ==
- Joe Lovano - alto clarinet, tenor saxophone
- Larry Farrell - trombone
- George Garzone - tenor saxophone
- Tim Hagans - trumpet
- John Hicks - piano
- Dennis Irwin - bass
- Ralph Lalama - clarinet, tenor saxophone
- Lewis Nash - drums
- Michael Parloff - flute
- Barry Ries - trumpet
- Charles Russo - clarinet, bass clarinet
- Gunther Schuller - conductor
- Steve Slagel - flute, alto and soprano saxophone
- Gary Smulyan - baritone saxophone
- James Weidman - piano
