= From the Soul =

Studio album by Joe Lovano
- Released: 1992
- Recorded: December 28, 1991
- Studio: Skyline, New York City
- Genre: Post-bop
- Length: 63:16
- Label: Blue Note
- Producer: Joe Lovano

Joe Lovano chronology
Sounds of Joy (1991)	From the Soul (1992)	Universal Language (1993)

From the Soul is a 1992 jazz album by American saxophonist and composer Joe Lovano, generally regarded as his masterpiece. It was recorded with a studio band rather than Lovano's working group; it is notable for his only encounter with Michel Petrucciani (who plays in a more abstract, Paul Bleyish style than was usual with him), and for being one of Ed Blackwell's final recordings.

Professional ratings
Review scores
Source	Rating
AllMusic	4.5/5 stars
The Encyclopedia of Popular Music	5/5 stars
Tom Hull	A
The Penguin Guide to Jazz	👑
The Rolling Stone Jazz & Blues Album Guide	4/5 stars

== Track listing ==
All compositions by Joe Lovano except as indicated

1. "Evolution" – 8:59
2. "Portrait of Jennie" (Gordon Burdge, J. Russel Robinson) – 7:56
3. "Lines & Spaces" – 6:20
4. "Body and Soul" (Frank Eyton, Johnny Green, Edward Heyman, Robert Sour) – 7:27
5. "Modern Man" – 5:23
6. "Fort Worth" – 6:29
7. "Central Park West" (John Coltrane) – 6:00
8. "Work" (Thelonious Monk) – 5:44
9. "Left Behind" (Judi Silverman) – 3:13
10. "His Dreams" – 5:45

(Recorded December 28, 1991, at Skyline Studio, New York City.)

== Personnel ==
- Joe Lovano – saxophones (tenor, alto, soprano)
- Michel Petrucciani – piano
- Dave Holland – bass
- Ed Blackwell – drums
