= Trio Tapestry =

Studio album by Joe Lovano
- Released: January 25, 2019
- Recorded: March 2018
- Studios: Sear Sound, New York City
- Genre: Jazz
- Length: 48:04
- Labels: ECM; ECM 2615
- Producer: Manfred Eicher

Joe Lovano chronology
| Classic! Live at Newport (2016) | Trio Tapestry (2019) | Garden of Expression (2021) |

Professional ratings
Review scores
| Source | Rating |
|---|---|
| The Absolute Sound | 4.5/5 stars |
| All About Jazz | 4/5 stars |
| AllMusic | 4.5/5 stars |
| Financial Times | 3/5 stars |
| Jazz Journal | 3/5 stars |
| Le Devoir | 4/5 stars |
| PopMatters | 8/10 |
| RTÉ.ie | 5/5 stars |
| The Times | 3/5 stars |
| Tom Hull | B+ |

Trio Tapestry is a studio album by American jazz saxophonist Joe Lovano recorded in March 2018 and released on ECM January the following year—his debut as bandleader for the label. The trio features pianist Marilyn Crispell and percussionist Carmen Castaldi.

== Reception ==
Thomas Conrad of JazzTimes praised Lovano's performance, stating "He is known for his power and his wealth of ideas. But here, in this spare context, he deals with fewer ideas and therefore concentrates on the essential ones. It is fascinating to hear him develop diverse melodies from the stepping stones of his tunes. In this bare trio, the beauty of his musical logic is laid bare. The reverberations of his gongs add mystery and also suggest key centers for improvisation."

Chris Pearson of The Times stated "Joe Lovano became famous for his exuberant, free-wheeling playing and passion for vintage modern jazz. Generating as much warmth as heat, he is among the most exciting and beloved jazz heroes of his time. Yet on this disc, his first as leader for ECM, he is a different man."

Paddy Kehoe of RTE.ie added "The album [is] a wedge of sax solo in the spotlight, drums or percussion sliding stealthily in, a piano lending body and intimacy. There is a pleasing serenity about much of the album, a feeling of quiet meander driven by Crispell’s Debussy-like touches."

== Track listing ==
All tracks are written by Joe Lovano.

| No. | Title | Length |
|---|---|---|
| 1. | "One Time In" | 3:41 |
| 2. | "Seeds of Change" | 5:13 |
| 3. | "Razzle Dazzle" | 3:40 |
| 4. | "Sparkle Lights" | 4:07 |
| 5. | "Mystic" | 8:25 |
| 6. | "Piano / Drum Episode" | 3:40 |
| 7. | "Gong Episode" | 2:01 |
| 8. | "Rare Beauty" | 6:18 |
| 9. | "Spirit Lake" | 3:49 |
| 10. | "Tarrassa" | 4:16 |
| 11. | "The Smiling Dog" | 2:55 |
| Total length: | | 48:04 |

== Personnel ==
- Joe Lovano – gong, tenor saxophone, tarogato
- Marilyn Crispell – piano
- Carmen Castaldi – drums, percussion
