= Viva Caruso =

Studio album by Joe Lovano
- Released: February 23, 2002
- Recorded: October 13 and 15, 2001
- Genre: Jazz
- Length: 65:06
- Label: Blue Note
- Producer: Joe Lovano

Joe Lovano chronology
Fourth World (2001)	Viva Caruso (2002)	On This Day ... Live at The Vanguard (2003)

Professional ratings
Review scores
Source	Rating
Allmusic	4.5/5 stars
Tom Hull	B+
The Penguin Guide to Jazz Recordings	3/4 stars

Viva Caruso is an album by American saxophonist Joe Lovano. It is a tribute album to opera singer Enrico Caruso, featuring a small orchestral ensemble and performing jazz interpretations of compositions associated with Caruso..

== Reception ==
Allmusic described this album as Lovano's "most ambitious and enjoyable recordings". Ben Ratliff of The New York Times mentioned: "Against the throbbing, susurrating group sound, Mr. Lovano just flowed, playing with a strong, aerated tone; he delivered fresh, forthright melodic material and played all around it. Everything about the set was original, from idea to execution."

== Track listing ==
1. "Vesti la giubba - Leoncavallo - 3:48
2. "Tarantella Sincera for voice & orchestra - DeCrescenzo - 4:42
3. "The Streets of Naples" - Lovano - 4:57
4. "Cielo Turchino for voice & orchestra [Deep Blue Sky] - Ciociano - 4:42
5. "Pecchè? for voice & orchestra [Why?] - Pennino - 7:39
6. "O sole mio, for voice & piano (or orchestra)" - DeCapua - 6:47
7. "Viva Caruso" - Lovano - 4:18
8. "Campane a sera "Ave Maria", for voice & orchestra [Evening Bells]" - Billi - 7:02
9. "Santa Lucia, Neapolitan song" - Traditional - 4:25
10. "Sultanto a Te for voice & orchestra [Only to You]" - Fuciio - 5:57
11. "Il Carnivale di Pulcinella - Lovano - 6:42
12. "For You Alone for voice & piano (or orchestra) - Geehl, O'Reilly - 4:07

== Personnel ==
- Joe Lovano – tenor sax (on all tracks)

Joe Lovano Street Band (tracks 1, 3, 6, 7, 9, 11)

- Joe Lovano – arrangements and orchestrations
- Ed Schuller and Scott Lee – bass (both on all tracks)
- Gil Goldstein – accordion (3, 7)
- Joey Baron – drums (3, 7, 9, 11)
- Carmen Castaldi – drums (1, 6, 7, 11)
- Bob Meyer – mallets (1), drums (6, 7, 11)
- Jamey Haddad – mazhar (frame drum) (11)
- Michael Bocian – acoustic guitar (11)
- Judi Silvano – voice and flute (11)
- Billy Drewes – clarinet (11)
- Herb Robertson – trumpet (11)
- Gary Valente – trombone (11)

Opera House Ensemble (tracks 2, 4, 5, 8, 10, 12)

- Byron Olson – arrangements, orchestrations, conductor
- Helen Campo – flute
- Dick Oatts – flute
- Billy Drewes – clarinet
- Charles Russo – bass clarinet
- Kim Lackowski – bassoon
- Michael Rabinowitz – bassoon
- Tom Christianson – oboe, English horn
- John Clark – French horn
- Ed Schuller – bass (tracks 2, 4, 8)
- Judi Silvano – voice (5 & 8)
- Gil Goldstein – accordion (5, 10, 12)
- Scott Lee – bass (5, 10, 12)
