= Landmarks (Joe Lovano album) =

Studio album by Joe Lovano
- Released: 1990
- Recorded: August 13–14, 1990
- Studio: Sorcerer Sound, New York City
- Genre: Jazz
- Length: 55:16
- Label: Blue Note
- Producer: John Scofield

Joe Lovano chronology
Worlds (1989)	Landmarks (1990)	Sounds of Joy (1991)

Landmarks is an album by the American jazz saxophonist Joe Lovano recorded in 1990 and released on the Blue Note label.

== Reception ==
The AllMusic review by Scott Yanow stated: "Although the title of this CD makes it sound as if tenor-saxophonist Joe Lovano was performing veteran jazz classics on this date, all but one of the ten songs played by his quintet are actually Lovano originals... Lovano is consistently creative during the modern mainstream music".

Professional ratings
Review scores
Source	Rating
AllMusic	4.5/5 stars
The Encyclopedia of Popular Music	4/5 stars
Tom Hull	A−
The Penguin Guide to Jazz Recordings	4/4 stars
The Rolling Stone Jazz & Blues Album Guide	3.5/5 stars

== Track listing ==
All compositions by Joe Lovano except as indicated

1. "The Owl and the Fox" - 3:05
2. "Primal Dance" - 6:17
3. "Emperor Jones" - 5:13
4. "Landmarks Along the Way" - 5:42
5. "Street Talk" - 2:30
6. "Here and Now" - 5:40
7. "I Love Music" (Hale Smith, Emil Boyd) - 5:19
8. "Where Hawks Fly" - 6:13
9. "Thanksgiving" - 6:35
10. "Dig This" - 8:41

== Personnel ==
- Joe Lovano – tenor saxophone
- John Abercrombie - guitar
- Kenny Werner – piano
- Marc Johnson – bass
- Bill Stewart – drums
