= Arctic Riff =

Studio album by Joe Lovano
- Released: June 26, 2020
- Recorded: August 2019
- Studio: Studios La Buissonne, Pernes les Fontaines (France)
- Genre: Jazz
- Length: 62:34
- Label: ECM Records
- Producer: Manfred Eicher

Joe Lovano chronology
Roma (2019)	Arctic Riff (2020)	Garden of Expression (2021)

Professional ratings
Review scores
Source	Rating
All About Jazz	4.5/5 stars
AllMusic	4.5/5 stars
DownBeat	4/5 stars
Jazzwise	3/5 stars

Arctic Riff is a studio album by the American jazz musician Joe Lovano and Marcin Wasilewski Trio. The album was released by ECM on 26 June 2020.

== Reception ==
Selwyn Harris of Jazzwise stated: "Although it's a less demanding recording than last year's Trio Tapestry, the ensemble dialogue is always exquisite." Mike Jurkovic of All About Jazz wrote: "Arctic Riff evinces pure proof that poets and artists imagine and interpret the future because their chosen manner of expression is so rooted to the voice of humanity's past. A gifted joint effort, Arctic Riff speaks in the glorious language of ECM piano trios long cherished and too numerous to list here." John Adcock of Jazz Journal added: "It’s an interesting combination, bringing out the usual space and restraint that characterises Wasilewski’s exploration of the trio setting. Lovano weaves his sound in to bring out different textures and moods, and as a set it works really well."

== Track listing ==
All tracks are written by Joe Lovano.

No.	Title	Lyrics	Length
1.	"Glimmer of Hope"	Marcin Wasilewski	8:33
2.	"Vashkar"	Carla Bley	5:56
3.	"Cadenza"	Marcin Wasilewski Trio	9:12
4.	"Fading Sorrow"	Marcin Wasilewski	6:01
5.	"Arco"	Marcin Wasilewski Trio	4:00
6.	"Stray Cat Walk"	Marcin Wasilewski Trio	2:32
7.	"L’Amour Fou"	Marcin Wasilewski	8:52
8.	"A Glimpse"	Marcin Wasilewski Trio	2:10
9.	"Vashkar (Var.)"	Carla Bley	4:38
10.	"On the Other Side"	Joe Lovano	5:01
11.	"Old Hat"	Marcin Wasilewski	5:35
Total length:			62:34

== Personnel ==
Band

- Marcin Wasilewski – piano
- Slawomir Kurkiewicz – double bass
- Michal Miskiewicz – drums
- Joe Lovano – tenor saxophone

Production

- Manfred Eicher – producer
- Gérard De Haro – engineering
- Nicolas Baillard – mastering
