= Celebrating Sinatra =

Studio album by Joe Lovano
- Released: 1997
- Recorded: June 2–3, 1996
- Studio: Clinton Studios, New York City
- Genre: Jazz
- Length: 1:08:58
- Label: Blue Note CDP 7243 8 37718 2 0
- Producer: Joe Lovano

Joe Lovano chronology
| Rush Hour (1995) | Celebrating Sinatra (1997) | Tenor Time (1997) |

Professional ratings
Review scores
| Source | Rating |
|---|---|
| Allmusic | 4.5/5 stars |
| The Encyclopedia of Popular Music | 3/5 stars |
| Tom Hull | B+ |
| The Penguin Guide to Jazz Recordings | 3.5/4 stars |
| Uncut | 2/5 stars |

Celebrating Sinatra is a 1996 studio album by American jazz saxophonist Joe Lovano released by the Blue Note label. Lovano leads a fifteen-piece ensemble playing some of Sinatra's most famous songs.

== Track listing ==
| No. | Title | Writer(s) | Length |
|---|---|---|---|
| 1. | "I'll Never Smile Again" | Ruth Lowe | 5:11 |
| 2. | "Chicago" | Fred Fisher | 3:58 |
| 3. | "I'm a Fool to Want You" | Joel Herron, Frank Sinatra, Jack Wolf | 4:30 |
| 4. | "Imagination" | Johnny Burke, James Van Heusen | 6:55 |
| 5. | "I've Got the World on a String" | Harold Arlen, Ted Koehler | 4:18 |
| 6. | "All the Way" | Sammy Cahn, James Van Heusen | 5:32 |
| 7. | "South of the Border" | Michael Carr, Jimmy Kennedy | 5:18 |
| 8. | "In Other Words" | Bart Howard | 3:53 |
| 9. | "I've Got You Under My Skin" | Cole Porter | 4:18 |
| 10. | "This Love of Mine" | Hank Sanicola, Sol Parker, Frank Sinatra | 7:19 |
| 11. | "Someone to Watch over Me" | George Gershwin, Ira Gershwin | 5:00 |
| 12. | "One for My Baby (and One More for the Road)" | Harold Arlen, Johnny Mercer | 4:00 |
| 13. | "The Song Is You" | Oscar Hammerstein II, Jerome Kern | 8:46 |
| Total length: | | | 01:08:58 |

== Personnel ==
Musicians

- Joe Lovano – tenor saxophone
- George Mraz – bass (tracks: 1, 3–13)
- Michael Rabinowitz – bassoon (tracks: 1, 6, 8, 12)
- Erik Friedlander – cello (tracks: 1, 3, 5–6, 8–9, 11–12)
- Manny Albam – conductor (tracks: 1, 6, 8, 12)
- Al Foster – drums
- John Clark – French horn (tracks: 1, 6, 8, 12)
- Emily Mitchell – harp (tracks: 1, 6, 8, 12)
- Kenny Werner – piano (tracks: 1, 3–6, 8–13)
- Billy Drewes – soprano saxophone, clarinet (bass) (tracks: 1, 3, 5–6, 8–9, 12)
- Ted Nash – tenor saxophone, clarinet (tracks: 1, 3, 5–6, 8–9, 11–12)
- Dick Oatts – tenor saxophone, flute (tracks: 1, 3, 5–6, 8–9, 11)
- Tom Christensen – tenor saxophone, oboe, English horn (tracks: 1, 3, 5–6, 8–9, 11–12)
- Lois Martin – viola (tracks: 1, 6, 8, 12)
- Mark Feldman – violin (tracks: 1, 6, 8, 12)
- Sara Parkins – violin (tracks: 1, 6, 8, 12)
- Judi Silvano – vocals (soprano) (tracks: 1, 3, 5–6, 8–9, 11–12)

Production

- Joe Lovano – producer
- James Farber – engineer
