= Friendly Fire (Joe Lovano and Greg Osby album) =

Studio album by Joe Lovano & Greg Osby
- Released: 1999
- Recorded: December 15–16, 1998
- Studio: Avatar, NYC
- Genre: Jazz
- Length: 67:42
- Label: Blue Note
- Producer: Joe Lovano and Greg Osby

Joe Lovano chronology
Trio Fascination: Edition One (1998)	Friendly Fire (1999)	52nd Street Themes (2000)

Greg Osby chronology
Zero (1998)	Friendly Fire (1999)	New Directions (2000)

Friendly Fire is an album by the American jazz saxophonists Joe Lovano and Greg Osby recorded in 1998 and released on the Blue Note label.

== Reception ==
Professional ratings
Review scores
Source	Rating
Allmusic	4/5 stars
Tom Hull	B+
The Penguin Guide to Jazz Recordings	3/4 stars

In his review for AllMusic, Stephen Thomas Erlewine states, "Lovano and Osby are both first-class improvisers, and they turn in dynamic performances throughout the album, whether it's on originals or standards. They turn Friendly Fire into a compelling listen that's the musical equivalent of the title's promise". Bill Shoemaker of JazzTimes commented "Track after track, Lovano and Osby confirm their marquee status. Consistently, their flinty exchanges provoke them to go beyond their usual high standards of passionate intelligence. As a result, this pairing has long-term potential. Hopefully, Lovano and Osby won’t wait for the next Blue Note anniversary for a second session".

== Track listing ==
All compositions by Joe Lovano except as indicated

1. "Geo J Lo" (Greg Osby) - 6:15
2. "The Wild East" - 6:34
3. "Serene" (Eric Dolphy) - 7:25
4. "Broad Way Blues" (Ornette Coleman) - 8:08
5. "Monk's Mood" (Thelonious Monk) - 4:47
6. "Idris" - 11:30
7. "Truth Be Told" (Osby) - 5:35
8. "Silenos" (Osby) - 5:36
9. "Alexander the Great" - 11:52

== Personnel ==
- Joe Lovano – tenor saxophone, soprano saxophone, flute
- Greg Osby - alto saxophone, soprano saxophone
- Jason Moran - piano
- Cameron Brown – bass
- Idris Muhammad – drums
