= Universal Language (Joe Lovano album) =

Studio album by Joe Lovano
- Released: 1993
- Recorded: June 26–28, 1992
- Studio: Skyline, New York City
- Genre: Jazz
- Length: 65:22
- Label: Blue Note
- Producer: Joe Lovano

Joe Lovano chronology
From the Soul (1992)	Universal Language (1993)	Tenor Legacy (1994)

Universal Language is an album by the American jazz saxophonist Joe Lovano recorded in 1992 and released on the Blue Note label.

== Reception ==
The AllMusic review by Stephen Thomas Erlewine stated: "Universal Language is one of Joe Lovano's most ambitious and successful albums, an attempt to prove the cliché that music is indeed the universal language... It's an unabashedly adventurous and risky project, and it works frighteningly well".

Professional ratings
Review scores
Source	Rating
AllMusic	4.5/5 stars
The Encyclopedia of Popular Music	3/5 stars
Tom Hull	B
The Penguin Guide to Jazz Recordings	3/4 stars
The Rolling Stone Jazz & Blues Album Guide	4/5 stars

== Track listing ==
All compositions by Joe Lovano except as indicated

1. "Luna Park" - 5:09
2. "Sculpture" - 9:04
3. "Josie and Rosie" - 6:48
4. "This Is Always" (Harry Warren) - 5:13
5. "Worship" - 4:55
6. "Cleveland Circle" - 4:58
7. "The Dawn of Time" - 7:25
8. "Lost Nations" - 6:23
9. "Hypnosis" - 6:13
10. "Chelsea Rendez-Vous" - 9:14

== Personnel ==
- Joe Lovano – tenor saxophone, alto saxophone, wood flute, alto clarinet, drums, percussion
- Tim Hagans – trumpet
- Kenny Werner – piano
- Charlie Haden, Scott Lee – bass
- Steve Swallow - electric bass
- Jack DeJohnette – drums
- Judi Silvano – vocal
