= On This Day ... Live at The Vanguard =

Live album by Joe Lovano
- Released: July 8, 2003
- Recorded: September 29, 2002
- Genre: Jazz
- Label: Blue Note
- Producer: Joe Lovano

Joe Lovano chronology
Viva Caruso (2002)	On This Day ... Live at The Vanguard (2003)	I'm All For You (2004)

Professional ratings
Review scores
Source	Rating
Allmusic	4/5 stars
The Penguin Guide to Jazz Recordings	3.5/4 stars
Tom Hull	B+

On This Day ... Live At The Vanguard is an album recorded live in September 2002 at the Village Vanguard jazz club by Joe Lovano with his award-winning nonet. It was released on July 8, 2003, via Blue Note label.

== Track listing ==
1. "At the Vanguard" – 9:33
2. "Focus" – 8:12
3. "After the Rain" – 7:39
4. "Good Bait" – 14:13
5. "Laura – 5:26
6. "On This Day (Just Like Any Other)" – 15:26
7. "My Little Brown Book" – 9:07

== Personnel ==
- Joe Lovano – tenor saxophone
- Larry Farrell – trombone
- George Garzone – tenor saxophone
- John Hicks – piano
- Dennis Irwin – bass
- Ralph Lalama – tenor saxophone
- Lewis Nash – drums
- Barry Ries – trumpet
- Scott Robinson – baritone saxophone
- Steve Slagle – alto saxophone
