= Village Rhythm =

Studio album by Joe Lovano
- Released: 1989
- Recorded: June 7–9, 1988
- Studio: Sound Ideas, New York City
- Genre: Jazz
- Length: 56:38
- Label: Soul Note
- Producer: Giovanni Bonandrini

Joe Lovano chronology
| Solid Steps (1986) | Village Rhythm (1989) | Worlds (1989) |

Village Rhythm is a studio album by the American jazz saxophonist Joe Lovano recorded in 1988 and released on the Italian Soul Note label.

== Reception ==
The AllMusic review by Scott Yanow stated: "By 1988, it was becoming increasingly obvious that tenor saxophonist Joe Lovano was on his way to becoming a major name in the jazz world... Lovano is heard throughout in his early prime, playing inventive and generally concise improvisations that were beginning to become distinctive".

Professional ratings
Review scores
| Source | Rating |
|---|---|
| AllMusic | 4/5 stars |
| The Encyclopedia of Popular Music | 4/5 stars |
| The Penguin Guide to Jazz Recordings | 3/4 stars |

== Track listing ==
All compositions by Joe Lovano except as indicated

== Track listing ==
| No. | Title | Length |
|---|---|---|
| 1. | "Village Rhythm" | 6:22 |
| 2. | "Birds of Springtime Gone By" | 5:54 |
| 3. | "Dewey Said" | 6:16 |
| 4. | "Chelsea Rendez-Vous" | 5:36 |
| 5. | "Variations of a Theme" | 3:14 |
| 6. | "His Dreams" | 6:51 |
| 7. | "T'Was to Me Part 1: Celebration of Life Everlasting" | 2:46 |
| 8. | "T'Was to Me Part II: Theme" | 2:21 |
| 9. | "Sleepy Giant" | 5:56 |
| 10. | "Duke Ellington's Sound of Love" (Charles Mingus) | 4:51 |
| 11. | "Spirit of the Night" | 6:31 |

- Recorded at Sound Ideas Studios in New York City on June 7, 8 & 9, 1988

== Personnel ==
- Joe Lovano – tenor saxophone, soprano saxophone
- Tom Harrell – trumpet
- Kenny Werner – piano
- Marc Johnson – bass
- Paul Motian – drums
