= Our Daily Bread (album) =

Studio album by Joe Lovano
- Released: May 5, 2023
- Recorded: May 2022
- Studio: Auditorio Stelio Molo RSI, Lugano
- Genre: Jazz
- Length: 40:47
- Label: ECM Records
- Producer: Manfred Eicher

Joe Lovano chronology
Garden of Expression (2021)	Our Daily Bread (2023)	Homage (2025)

Professional ratings
Review scores
Source	Rating
All About Jazz	4/5 stars
Allmusic	4/5 stars
Financial Times	4/5 stars
Jazzwise	4/5 stars
The Sydney Morning Herald	4.5/5 stars
Tom Hull	B+

Our Daily Bread is a studio album by the American band Trio Tapestry led by Joe Lovano. The album was released by ECM on 5 May 2023 to favorable critical reviews. This is the band's third release. The album contains eight original tracks written by Lovano.

== Description ==
Mike Hobart of Financial Times noted, "The ECM label’s emphasis on melody, shifting textures and gently unfolding moods occasionally slips into pleasant background noise. Although rhythms remain subdued on Our Daily Bread, having saxophonist Joe Lovano as lead voice means that emotions are made of sterner stuff. Add in thoughtful compositions and the subtle interplay of his established working band Trio Tapestry and this all-original set engages throughout."

Mike Jurkovic of All About Jazz wrote, "Rising from a serene inner place, the music takes shape like prayer. That it is prayer that lies at the beating heart of all eight spacious spirituals that comprise Our Daily Bread, should come as no surprise." John Shand of The Sydney Morning Herald added, "Lovano is at his peak here. There’s no trace of the opaqueness or virtuosic glibness that could occasionally dilute his never-in-doubt mastery or creativity... This is an album to be treasured."

== Track listing ==
All tracks are written by Joe Lovano.

No.	Title	Length
1.	"All Twelve"	4:36
2.	"Grace Notes"	8:42
3.	"Le Petit Opportun"	3:44
4.	"Our Daily Bread"	6:34
5.	"One For Charlie"	2:31
6.	"The Power of Three"	4:41
7.	"Rhythm Spirit"	5:50
8.	"Crystal Ball"	4:09
Total length:		40:47

== Personnel ==
Trio Tapestry

- Joe Lovano – tenor saxophone, tárogató, gong
- Carmen Castaldi – drums, gong, temple bells
- Marilyn Crispell – piano

Production

- Stefano Amerio – engineer
- Manfred Eicher – producer
