= Tones, Shapes & Colors =

Live album by Joe Lovano
- Released: 1985
- Recorded: November 21, 1985
- Venue: Jazz Center of New York City
- Genre: Jazz
- Length: 59:07
- Label: Soul Note
- Producer: Giovanni Bonandrini

Joe Lovano chronology
Tones, Shapes & Colors (1985)	Hometown Sessions (1986)

Tones, Shapes & Colors is the debut live album by the American jazz saxophonist Joe Lovano recorded in 1985 and released on the Italian Soul Note label.

== Reception ==
The Allmusic review by Scott Yanow awarded the album 4 stars stating "None of the tunes are simple or based on the chords of standards, but although they did not catch on, the interplay by the musicians, the excellent pacing of tempos and moods, and the consistently satisfying solos make this a set worth searching for".

Professional ratings
Review scores
Source	Rating
Allmusic	4/5 stars
The Encyclopedia of Popular Music	3/5 stars
The Penguin Guide to Jazz Recordings	3/4 stars

== Track listing ==
All compositions by Joe Lovano except as indicated

1. "Chess Mates" (Ken Werner) - 8:59
2. "Compensation" (Werner) - 12:33
3. "La Louisiane" - 4:19
4. "Tones, Shapes and Colors" - 5:36
5. "Ballad for Trane" (Werner) - 10:24
6. "In the Jazz Community" - 9:44
7. "Nocturne" (Werner) [not included on LP] - 7:32

* Recorded at the Jazz Centre of New York City on November 21, 1985

== Personnel ==
- Joe Lovano – tenor saxophone, gongs
- Ken Werner – piano
- Dennis Irwin – bass
- Mel Lewis – drums
