= Sounds of Joy =

Studio album by Joe Lovano
- Released: January 1991
- Recorded: January 26, 1991
- Studio: Audioforce, New York
- Genre: Jazz
- Length: 1:00:13
- Label: Enja Records
- Producer: Horst Weber

Joe Lovano chronology
Landmarks (1990)	Sounds of Joy (1991)	From the Soul (1991)

Professional ratings
Review scores
Source	Rating
AllMusic	4/5 stars
The Encyclopedia of Popular Music	4/5 stars
The Penguin Guide to Jazz Recordings	4/4 stars
The Rolling Stone Jazz & Blues Album Guide	3.5/5 stars

Sounds of Joy is a studio album by the American jazz saxophonist Joe Lovano, recorded on January 26, 1991, and released on the Enja Records label.

== Track list ==
All compositions by Joe Lovano

1. "Sounds of Joy" – 6:31
2. "Strength and Courage" – 6:35
3. "I'll Wait and Pray" – 4:30
4. "Cedar Avenue Blues" – 7:00
5. "Bass and Space" – 7:52
6. "Ettenro" – 9:32
7. "Until the Moment Was Now" – 4:19
8. "This One's For Lacy" – 8:21
9. "23rd Street Theme" – 5:33

== Personnel ==
- Anthony Cox - bass
- Ed Blackwell - drums
- Joe Lovano - tenor saxophone, soprano saxophone, alto clarinet
