= Sound Prints =

Live album by Joe Lovano and Dave Douglas
- Released: 2015
- Recorded: September 21, 2013
- Venue: Monterey Jazz Festival
- Genre: Jazz
- Length: 51:52
- Label: Blue Note
- Producer: Dave Douglas and Joe Lovano

Dave Douglas chronology
Present Joys (2014)	Sound Prints (2015)	High Risk (2015)

Joe Lovano chronology
Cross Culture (2013)	Sound Prints (2015)	Classic! Live at Newport (2016)

Sound Prints (subtitled Live at Monterey Jazz Festival) is a live album by trumpeter Dave Douglas and saxophonist Joe Lovano recorded at the 2013 Monterey Jazz Festival. It was released on the Blue Note label in 2015 and features a live performance by Douglas and Lovano with pianist Lawrence Fields, bassist Linda Oh and drummer Joey Baron playing original material and two new compositions by Wayne Shorter.

== Reception ==
Professional ratings
Review scores
Source	Rating
Allmusic	4/5 stars
Tom Hull	A−

Allmusic awarded the album 4 stars, stating: "Ultimately, Sound Prints walk the line between muscular, tangible post-bop and free-flowing, avant-garde playing; a tantalizing dance that never fails to leave an impression". In JazzTimes, Michael J. West wrote "the real meat of the recording, and of the band, is their interplay: harmony, counterpoint, call-and-response. It’s not what one might expect from a project inspired by Wayne Shorter. But Sound Prints is less about Shorter’s individual style than his audacity and innovation, and on those fronts Live triumphs".

== Track listing ==
1. "Sound Prints" (Joe Lovano) - 4:38
2. "Sprints" (Dave Douglas) - 13:58
3. "Destination Unknown" (Wayne Shorter) - 8:32
4. "To Sail Beyond the Sunset" (Shorter) - 10:25
5. "Weatherman" (Lovano) - 1:34
6. "Power Ranger" (Douglas) - 12:45

== Personnel ==
- Dave Douglas - trumpet
- Joe Lovano - tenor saxophone
- Lawrence Fields - piano
- Linda Oh - bass
- Joey Baron - drums
