= Kids: Live at Dizzy's Club Coca-Cola =

Live album by Joe Lovano and Hank Jones
- Released: May 8, 2007
- Recorded: April 27–28, 2006
- Venue: Dizzy's Club Coca-Cola at Jazz at Lincoln Center, NYC
- Genre: Jazz
- Length: 69:32
- Label: Blue Note; 70281
- Producer: Michael Cuscuna

Joe Lovano chronology
| Streams of Expression (2005) | Kids: Live at Dizzy's Club Coca-Cola (2007) | Symphonica (2008) |

Hank Jones chronology
| You Are There (2007) | Kids: Live at Dizzy's Club Coca-Cola (2007) | July 5 th - Live at Birdland NY (2007) |

Kids: Live at Dizzy's Club Coca-Cola is a live album by pianist Hank Jones and saxophonist Joe Lovano recorded at Lincoln Centre in 2006 for the Blue Note label.

== Reception ==
Professional ratings
Review scores
| Source | Rating |
|---|---|
| Allmusic | 4.5/5 stars |
| All About Jazz | 4/5 stars |
| Tom Hull | A− |

Allmusic awarded the album 4½ stars, stating: "Although the team of Joe Lovano and the ageless Hank Jones was not inevitable, it has proven to be an ideal matchup between two giants of jazz. Recommended". In JazzTimes Mike Joyce wrote "on this intimate date, recorded live in Manhattan, what’s particularly apparent is the ease with which Lovano and Jones exchange ideas while complementing not just each other but also the tune at hand". All About Jazz called it "a disc of pure pleasure—two jazz greats with over a century of experience between them engaged in a joyful, generous, and spontaneous musical conversation"

== Track listing ==
1. "Lady Luck" (Thad Jones) - 8:34
2. "Charlie Chan" (Joe Lovano) - 5:37
3. "Lullaby" (Hank Jones) - 8:08
4. "Little Rascal on a Rock" (Thad Jones) - 6:35
5. "Budo" (Bud Powell, Miles Davis) - 4:05
6. "Soultrane" (Tadd Dameron) - 7:33
7. "Kids Are Pretty People" (Thad Jones) - 7:34
8. "Oh, What a Beautiful Mornin'" (Richard Rodgers, Oscar Hammerstein II) - 4:19
9. "Oh! Look at Me Now" (Joe Bushkin, John DeVries) - 2:46
10. "Four in One" (Thelonious Monk) - 5:54
11. "Lazy Afternoon" (Jerome Moross, John La Touche) - 8:27

== Personnel ==
- Joe Lovano - soprano saxophone, tenor saxophone
- Hank Jones - piano
