= Oxford Performing Arts Center =

Performing arts center in Oxford, Alabama

Coordinates: 33.6146°N 85.8340°W

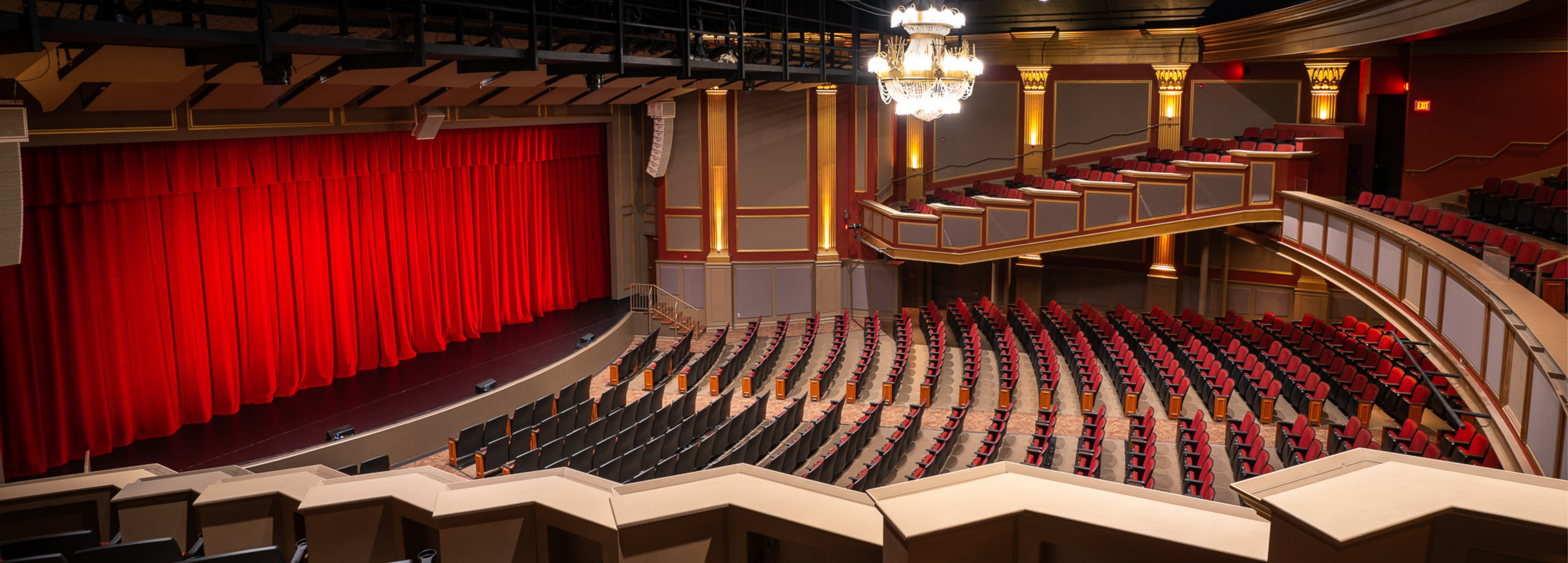
The 1200-seat main theatre within the Oxford Performing Arts Center

The Oxford Performing Arts Center is a performing arts venue located in Oxford, Alabama. The venue opened in May 2013 with a gala concert by the Alabama Symphony Orchestra.

The $10.4-million project saw the addition of a 1,200-seat theatre to an existing historic building dating to 1921, which previously served as a school, city hall, police station, and city jail. Located in the Oxford's downtown commercial district, the venue was designed by Goodwyn, Mills, and Cawood Architects of Montgomery, Alabama. During expansion and restoration, historical aspects of the original 1921 building were retained, such as flooring and columns. Since its opening in 2013, the venue has had a series of renovations to enhance front of house spaces and production capabilities. The first renovation commenced in 2015 and included the addition of a women's restroom and an expanded box office. The most recent renovation, in 2018, added 100 box seats to the main theatre, added a studio theatre to the venue, and expanded the theatrical fly system.

The center utilizes the Tessitura ticketing platform and maintains memberships in regional and national arts organizations, such as the Association of Performing Arts Professionals. The Oxford Performing Arts Center has presented several national Broadway touring musicals, including The Sound of Music, Jersey Boys, and Chicago.

In August 2022, the center presented and hosted the inaugural Rubato International Piano Festival with support from Steinway Piano. The competition is the first of its kind as it will integrate the categories of classical and jazz music in a single competition. The judges for the inaugural competition are Steinway Hall of Fame of artists and professors from Fullerton College, Berklee College of Music, Texas A&M, University of Georgia, and the University of Alabama at Birmingham.
