= Cross Culture (album) =

Studio album by Joe Lovano Us Five
- Released: January 8, 2013
- Recorded: January 12–15, 2012
- Studio: Sear Sound, New York City
- Genre: Jazz, post-bop
- Length: 60:00
- Label: Blue Note
- Producer: Joe Lovano

Joe Lovano chronology
Bird Songs (2011)	Cross Culture (2013)	Sound Prints (2015)

Professional ratings
Aggregate scores
Source	Rating
Metacritic	71/100
Review scores
Source	Rating
All About Jazz	3.5/5 stars
Allmusic	3.5/5 stars
The Guardian	3.5/5 stars
Evening Standard	4/5 stars
PopMatters	7/10
Tom Hull	A−

Cross Culture is the twenty-third studio album by American musician Joe Lovano and the third with his band Us Five. It was released in January 2013 under Blue Note Records to a favorable critical reception. On Metacritic, the album scored 71% on five reviews, which means "generally favorable reviews".

== Reviews ==
John Fordham, writing for The Guardian, stated: "Saxophonist Joe Lovano's vast experience gives him a profound awareness of what jazz has been, and feeds a fertile imagination for what it can be. Cross Culture is more or less the two-drummers band that made the excellent Bird Songs in 2011—with Esperanza Spalding putting in a bass appearance, and gifted west African guitarist Lionel Loueke guesting—in a session celebrating idioms and instruments from all over the world".

Ben Ratliff and Jon Caramanica of The New York Times wrote "The record isn't making any kind of argument on behalf of free improvising. Mr. Lovano isn't partisan like that. There's a gold-star version here of one of jazz's most elegant ballad standards, Billy Strayhorn's "Star Crossed Lovers," with rustling free rhythm at the beginning and end and easy swing in the middle. Mr. Lovano's performance is a knockout. Both he and Mr. Weidman play with care and attention to the song's changes; Ms. Spalding plays a melodic, songlike bass solo. But right after that comes a runic, short-melody, Paul Motian-inspired piece called "Journey Within," and then "Drum Chant," a raw and generous jam session that at a little over four minutes feels too long. "Cross Culture" covers the bases, showing you all it can do, though surely not out of a desire to impress. It's a record with very little anxiety."

== Track list ==
All tracks are written by Joe Lovano, except "Star Crossed Lovers" written by Billy Strayhorn and Duke Ellington.

No.	Title	Length
1.	"Blessings in May"	6:18
2.	"Myths and Legends"	4:59
3.	"Cross Culture"	6:35
4.	"In a Spin"	4:29
5.	"Star Crossed Lovers"	7:34
6.	"Journey Within"	5:41
7.	"Drum Chant"	4:21
8.	"Golden Horn"	5:17
9.	"Royal Roost"	5:54
10.	"Modern Man"	2:43
11.	"PM"	7:49
Total length:		60:00

== Personnel ==
- Joe Lovano – tenor and G mezzo-soprano saxophone, aulochrome, tárogató, oborom drum, gongs, shakers, puddle drums
- James Weidman – piano
- Lionel Loueke – guitar (tracks: 2 3 4 6 7 11)
- Esperanza Spalding – bass (tracks: 1 5 8 10)
- Peter Slavov – bass (tracks: 2 3 4 8 9 11)
- Otis Brown III – drums
- Francisco Mela – drums, balafon, whistle
