= Belden Bullock =

American jazz musician (born 1957)

Belden L. Bullock (born December 26, 1957) is an American jazz double-bassist.

Born in Boston, Massachusetts, Bullock learned to play bass guitar before picking up stand-up bass in the early 1970s. He studied at Berklee College of Music from 1977 to 1981 and played in the 1980s with George Adams, Roy Haynes, Andrew Hill, and Ahmad Jamal. He worked in a number of small groups in the 1990s, including Ralph Peterson, Jr.'s Fo'Tet, the Spirit of Life Ensemble, and Talib Kibwe and James Weidman's Taja quartet. Other associations in the 1990s included Oliver Lake, Abdullah Ibrahim, Greg Osby, Jay Hoggard, Donald Harrison, Kevin Eubanks, and James Spaulding.
