= Solid Steps =

Studio album by Joe Lovano
- Released: 1986
- Recorded: October 1986
- Studio: Studio 44, Monster, Netherlands
- Genre: Jazz
- Label: Jazz Club JC 6011

Joe Lovano chronology
Hometown Sessions (1986)	Solid Steps (1986)	Village Rhythm (1988)

Solid Steps is a studio album by the American jazz saxophonist Joe Lovano recorded in 1986 and released on the Jazz Club label. The album was re-released on the September label (CD September 05124) in 2003 with a different cover. The album is Joe Lovano's first official studio recording as a leader.

== Track listing ==
1. "Solid Steps" – 5:30
2. "Who Knows" – 8:45
3. "H and C's Dance" – 8:00
4. "Straight Shot" – 6:09
5. "Lofritian Mode" – 5:50
6. "A Picture of Her" – 5:48
7. "Gustavia" – 5:21
8. "Benjamin" – 4:45
9. "Pretext" – 5:04
10. "Soulrole" – 4:57

== Personnel ==
- Hein Van de Geyn – bass
- Dré Pallemaerts – drums
- Bert Joris – flugelhorn, trumpet
- Michel Herr – piano
- Joe Lovano – saxophone
