= Effortless Mastery =

1996 book by Kenny Werner

- Author: Kenny Werner
- Language: English
- Subject: Musical freedom
- Publisher: Jamey Aebersold
- Publication date: 1996
- Media type: Print (Paperback)
- Pages: 196 pp
- ISBN: 1-56224-003-X

Effortless Mastery is a book written by jazz pianist Kenny Werner, that deals with musical freedom for musicians. It comes with an audio CD containing four meditations.

== Overview ==
The book begins by chronicling Werner's musical education. He was a dysfunctional learner from an early age, which he credits to the school system and the "cultural wasteland" which he grew up in. (Note: Chapter 2, pp 15–17) While he never practiced unless forced to, he was still the best pianist in the neighborhood, the only way he had of being accepted by his peers. (Note: Chapter 2, pp. 18–19) When he was of college age, he applied to and was accepted to the Manhattan School of Music, where he discovered to his dismay, that there were students there who could play as well or better than he could, and who practiced.

He decided that classical piano was not for him, and switched to Berklee College of Music, because of its jazz program. He was relieved to find others like him, and finally began to practice in some way. (Note: Chapter 2, pp 20–21) While there, he took lessons with a woman named Madame Chaloff, who focused on the physical action of playing the piano gracefully. (Note: Chapter 2, pp 22)

After attending Berklee three years, he visited Rio de Janeiro, where he met Joăo Assis Brasil. Brasil had recently suffered a nervous breakdown from strenuous practicing, and taught Werner an exercise that his therapist had taught him. (Note: Chapter 2, pp. 23–24) After playing nothing but this exercise for a week, Werner performed, and discovered that he was playing better, despite having only practiced the exercise. From that point, he developed his philosophy and teaching methods which led to this book. (Note: Chapter 2, pp. 25–26)

From there, the book focuses on reasons why people play, why they stop playing, and why some are afraid of playing music. (Note: Chapters 3–9) He talks about dysfunctional and fear-based teaching, practicing, listening, and composing. (Note: Chapters 6–9) Then he begins talking about "The Space" and effortless playing. The four meditations on the CD are meant to be listened to in-between chapters in this section of the book. He describes effortless playing in four steps: Step one is being able to play a note on one's instrument while relaxed and calm, step two is to play a free improvisation while in said state, step three is discovering what things one can play while in this state, step four is to master playing music effortlessly, hence the book's name. (Note: Chapters 16–20)

== Films ==
On 7 September 2010, the film Living Effortless Mastery was released. It includes 3 1/2 hours of clinics, master classes, and performances. In 2013, Effortless Mastery: The 4 Steps, was released. It was a recording of a lecture given by Werner in New York explaining the same concepts found in the book.

== Reception ==
The book was received very well, with over ninety thousand copies having been sold as of 2014. It has been acclaimed by many musicians, such as Quincy Jones and Herb Alpert, who called it "simple, direct, perfect...and profound."

== Effortless Mastery Institute ==
The Effortless Mastery Institute at Berklee College of Music teaches the book's method, as well as tai chi and yoga. Werner has been the director of the institute since 2014. Werner has said of the instate, "we encourage them to make mistakes, to play carelessly. They begin to understand where they really are as a player, and the fear goes away."

== 20th anniversary edition ==
In February 2016, a limited edition 20th anniversary edition was released, with additional content and a foil embossed cover. Werner played a concert at the Berklee Performance Center to celebrate its release, described as "a convincing celebration of the wondrous possibilities of musical expression."
