= Hometown Sessions =

Studio album by Joe Lovano
- Released: 1986
- Recorded: March 16, 1986
- Studio: Beechwood, Cleveland, Ohio
- Genre: Jazz
- Length: 49:02
- Label: JSL Records
- Producer: Joe Lovano

Joe Lovano chronology
Tones, Shapes & Colors (1985)	Hometown Sessions (1986)	Solid Steps (1986)

Hometown Sessions is the second studio album by the American jazz saxophonist Joe Lovano recorded in 1986 and released via JSL Records label.

== Track listing ==
1. "Stablemates" (Benny Golson) – 5:32
2. "Now Is the Time" (Sol Parker) – 5:45
3. "Body and Soul" (Frank Eyton, Johnny Green, Edward Heyman, Robert Sour) – 3:05
4. "Be-Bop" (Dizzy Gillespie) – 6:02
5. "You're a Weaver of Dreams" (Victor Young) – 8:00
6. "T's Bag" (Joe Lovano) – 2:40
7. "Two Tenors" (Joe Lovano) – 2:48
8. "St. Thomas" (Sonny Rollins) – 5:13
9. "Misterioso" (Thelonious Monk) – 5:42

== Personnel ==
- Joe Lovano - tenor and soprano saxophone
- Anthony Lovano (tracks: 8), Joe Lovano (tracks: 6), Lawrence Jacktown Jackson - drums
- Eddie Baccus - organ
- Tony "Big T" Lovano (tracks: 2 3 4 6 7) - tenor saxophone
