= Francisco Mela =

Cuban drummer and percussionist (born 1968)

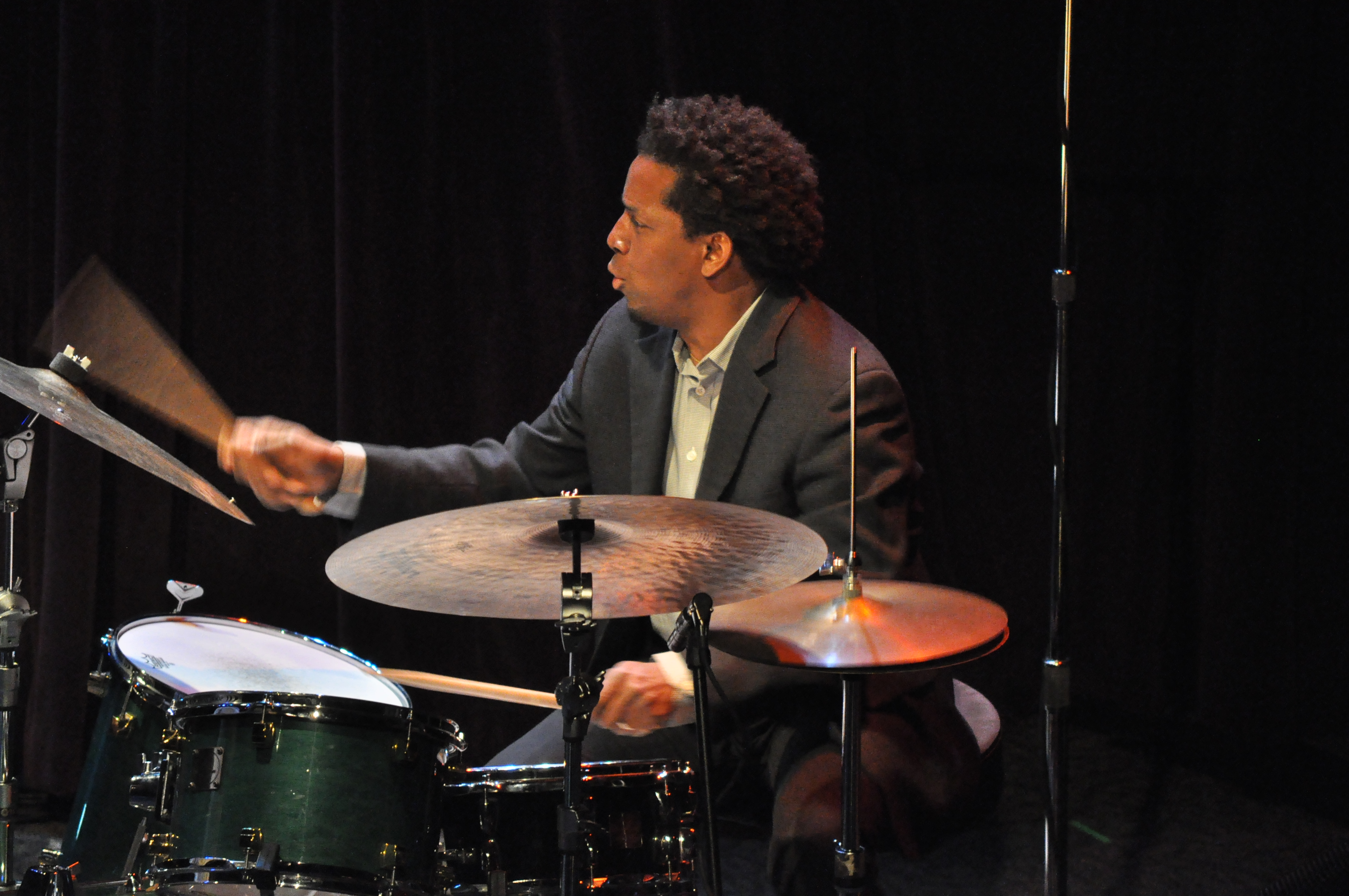
- Francisco Mela

Background information
- Born: Francisco Jose Mela; February 5, 1968 (age 58); Bayamo, Cuba
- Genre: Jazz
- Occupation: Musician
- Instrument: Drums
- Website: franciscomela.com

Francisco Jose Mela is a Cuban drummer and percussionist who has performed with a wide array of prominent international Latin and jazz artists including Kenny Barron, Gary Bartz, JoAnne Brackeen, Jane Bunnett, Regina Carter, Anat Cohen, Paquito D'Rivera, George Garzone, Larry Grenadier, Stefon Harris, Lionel Loueke, Joe Lovano, Jason Moran, John Patitucci, John Scofield, Esperanza Spalding, Mark Turner, McCoy Tyner, Chucho Valdés, Kenny Werner, and many others.

== Biography ==
Born in Bayamo, Cuba, Francisco Mela studied at the Music School of Arts El Yarey as a teenager before furthering his studies at the National School of Arts for Teachers, el CENCEA. He taught at Rafael's Cabrera Conservatory of Music and played with some of the country's top Latin jazz musicians, as well as leading his group, MelaSon Latin Jazz Band, that toured throughout Mexico. In 2000, he moved to Boston to study at Berklee College of Music and was invited to join the percussion faculty. He became the house drummer at the Wally's Café. It was here where he developed the concept for what would later be his own group.

In 2005, Mela joined the quartet of saxophonist Joe Lovano. Of particular note was the group's 2008 album on Blue Note entitled Folk Art. Later that year, Mela was approached by McCoy Tyner to join his trio.

Mela was named the Twin Cities Jazz Festival's first artistic director in 2014, Before appointment, he served as artistic director for the Xalapa Jazz Festival in Veracruz, Mexico (2010-2013).

In late 2016, Mela was part of an inaugural ensemble that joined Afro-Cuban pianist Chucho Valdés and saxophonist Joe Lovano for an international tour throughout Europe and North America. He also leads his own group, The Crash Trio.

== Recordings ==
Mela released his first CD titled Melao in 2006 to favorable reviews. His second release as a leader, Cirio (Half Note Records), was recorded in 2008 over a week-long residency at the New York’s Blue Note Jazz Club and features Mark Turner, Jason Moran, Larry Grenadier, and Lionel Loueke. Tree Of Life (2011), Mela’s third recording and second release on Half Note, is an amalgamation of his favorite bands that inspired him to become a drummer (Miles Davis’ fusion group featuring Chick Corea and Keith Jarrett, Weather Report, and the Latin-jazz super group Irakere). The album highlights an ensemble coined “Cuban Safari,” and provides Mela space to showcase a diverse fusion of Cuban and jazz polyrhythms.

FE (2016) is Francisco Mela's fourth and most recent project as a leader. The self-released album spotlights two standout musicians that join him to form The Crash Trio, pianist Leo Genovese, and bassist Gerald Cannon. Appearing as a featured guest on the recording is guitarist John Scofield. The album is of particular significance to Mela as it was written in honor of one of his musical mentors, McCoy Tyner, and is a tribute to his late parents.

== Critical reception ==
"...Mela's drumming is expressive and rudimentary perfect, laying down an expansive palette, while not crowding his fellow accompanists."

"Mela also has one of the most mercurial and quickest-thinking brains in music and can be both powerful and lucid, turning on a dime from an almost other-worldly, hallucinatory voice to a musician with a painterly, patrician demeanor."

"...the drummer achieves a rare balance between sophistication and abandon, as he delivers irrepressible rhythmic layers behind, between and around the rest of his band."

"The brilliance of Cirio, recorded live at the Blue Note, lies in drummer/bandleader Francisco Mela’s ability to inform its eight pieces with the Cuban sensibilities of his upbringing without ever succumbing to an unfettered traditional island rhythm."

"...Mr. Mela is a bandleader on the rise..."

== Discography ==
=== All as a leader ===
Year	Title	Label	Featured personnel
2016	FE	self released	Francisco Mela (drums); Gerald Cannon (bass); Leo Genovese (piano); special guest, John Scofield (guitar)
2011	Francisco Mela & Cuban Safari: Tree Of Life	Half Note	Francisco Mela (drums, vocals); Elio Villafranca (piano); Leo Genovese (piano); Uri Gurvich (saxophone); Ben Monder (guitar); Luques Curtis (bass); Mauricio Herrera (percussion); Esperanza Spalding (vocals) track 4; Peter Slavov (bass); Arturo Stable (percussion); Jowee Omicil (saxophone)
2008	Cirio: Live at the Blue Note	Half Note	Francisco Mela (drums, vocals); Jason Moran (piano); Larry Grenadier (bass); Mark Turner (soprano sax); Lionel Loueke (guitar, vocals)
2006	Melao	Ayva Musica	Francisco Mela (drums, vocals, percussion); Joe Lovano (tenor saxophone); George Garzone (tenor saxophone); Anat Cohen (tenor saxophone, clarinet); Lionel Loueke (guitar); Nir Felder (electric guitar & effects); Leo Genovese (piano, Fender Rhodes, keyboard); Peter Slavov (bass)
