= Joe Lovano =

American jazz flautist, saxophonist, clarinettist (born 1952)

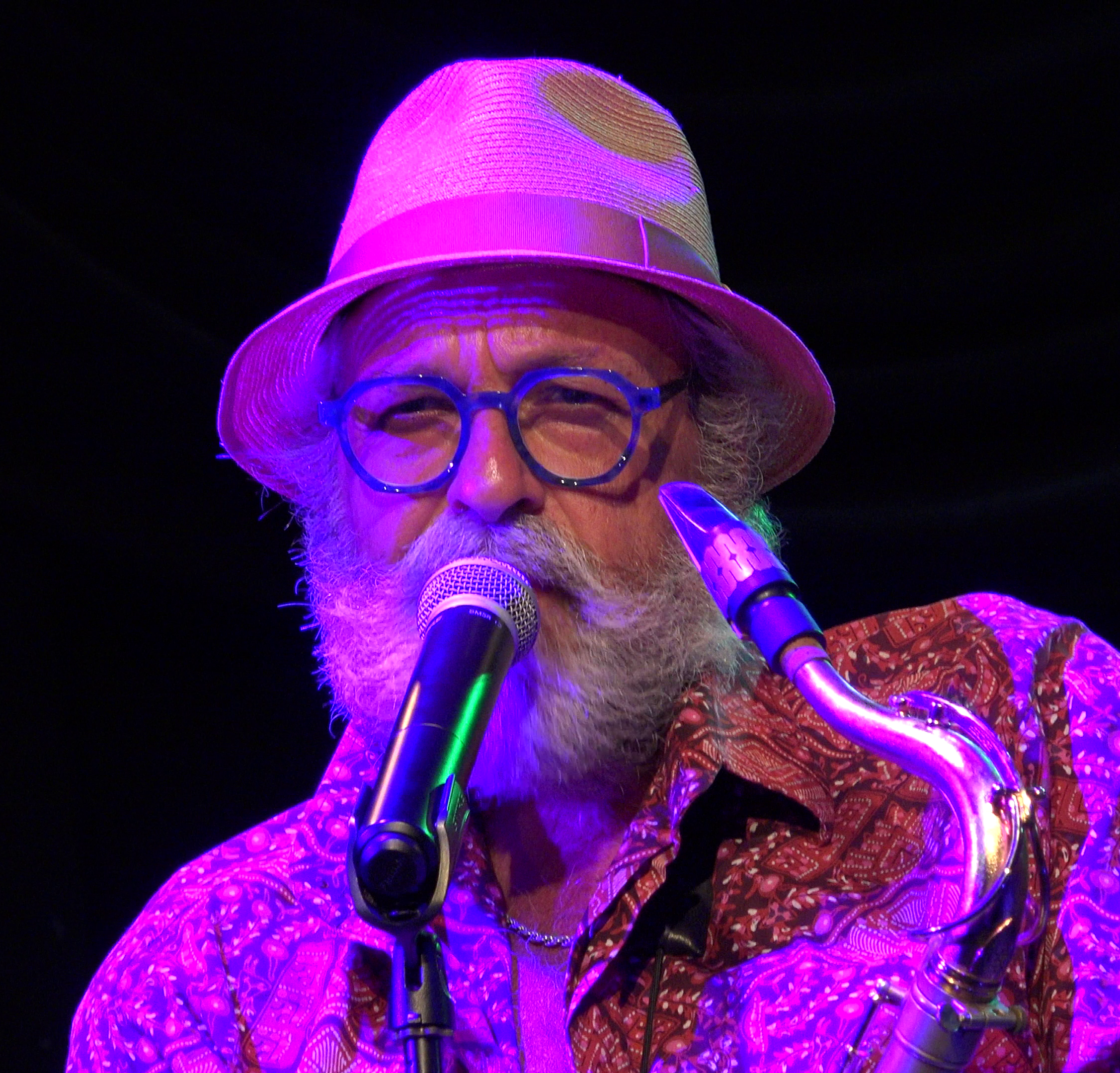
- Lovano in 2024 at DROM (David Haney's New York Jazz Stories)

Background information
- Born: Joseph Salvatore Lovano; December 29, 1952 (age 73); Cleveland, Ohio, U.S.
- Genres: Jazz, modal jazz
- Occupation: Musician
- Instruments: Saxophones, clarinet, tárogató, flute, drums, gongs
- Years active: 1970s–present
- Labels: Soul Note, Evidence, Enja, Blue Note, ECM
- Website: www.joelovano.com

Joseph Salvatore Lovano (born December 29, 1952) is an American jazz multi-instrumentalist. Though best known as a tenor saxophonist, Lovano has also recorded on alto clarinet, flute and drums, amongst other instruments. He has earned a Grammy Award and several mentions in Down Beat magazine's critics' & readers' polls. His wife is singer Judi Silvano, with whom he records and performs. Lovano was a longtime member of the late drummer Paul Motian's trio alongside guitarist Bill Frisell.

== Biography ==
=== Early life ===
Lovano was born in Cleveland, Ohio, United States, to Sicilian-American parents; his father was the tenor saxophonist Tony ("Big T") Lovano. His father's family came from Alcara Li Fusi in Sicily, and his mother's family came from Cesarò, also in Sicily. In Cleveland, Lovano's father exposed him to jazz throughout his early life, teaching him the standards, as well as how to lead a gig, pace a set, and be versatile enough to find work. Lovano started on alto saxophone at age six and switched to tenor saxophone five years later. John Coltrane, Dizzy Gillespie, and Sonny Stitt were among his earlier influences. After graduating from Euclid High School in 1971, he went to Berklee College of Music, where he studied under Herb Pomeroy and Gary Burton. Lovano received an honorary doctorate of music from the college in 1998.

=== Career ===
After Berklee he worked with Jack McDuff and Lonnie Smith. He spent three years with the Woody Herman orchestra, then moved to New York City, where he played with the big band of Mel Lewis. He often plays lines that convey the rhythmic drive and punch of an entire horn section. In the mid 1980s Lovano began working in a quartet with John Scofield and in a trio with Bill Frisell and Paul Motian.

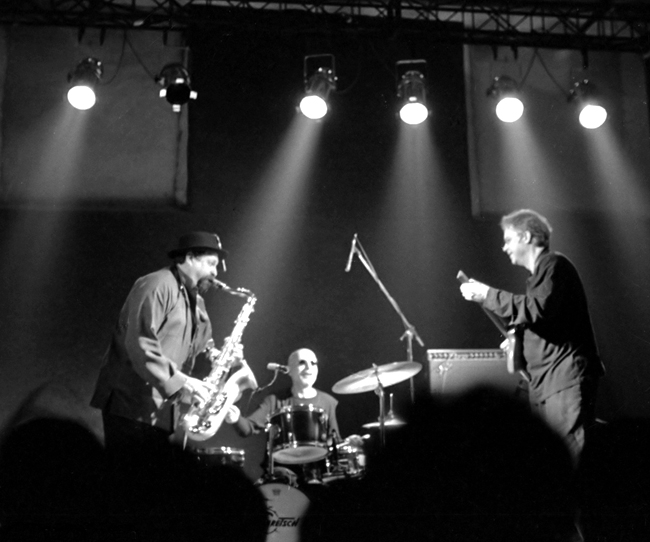
Joe Lovano, Paul Motian, and Bill Frisell

In 1990 Lovano joined Blue Note Records. Many outstanding releases followed, including the highly diverse Rush Hour (tracks range from solo to big band), collaborations with saxophonists Joshua Redman (Tenor Legacy) and Greg Osby (Friendly Fire), 52nd Street Themes (with a nonet), and four albums featuring the classic pianist Hank Jones.

In the late 1990s, he formed the Saxophone Summit with Dave Liebman and Michael Brecker (later replaced by Ravi Coltrane). Streams of Expression (2006) was a tribute to both cool jazz and free jazz. Lovano and pianist Hank Jones released an album together in June 2007, entitled Kids.

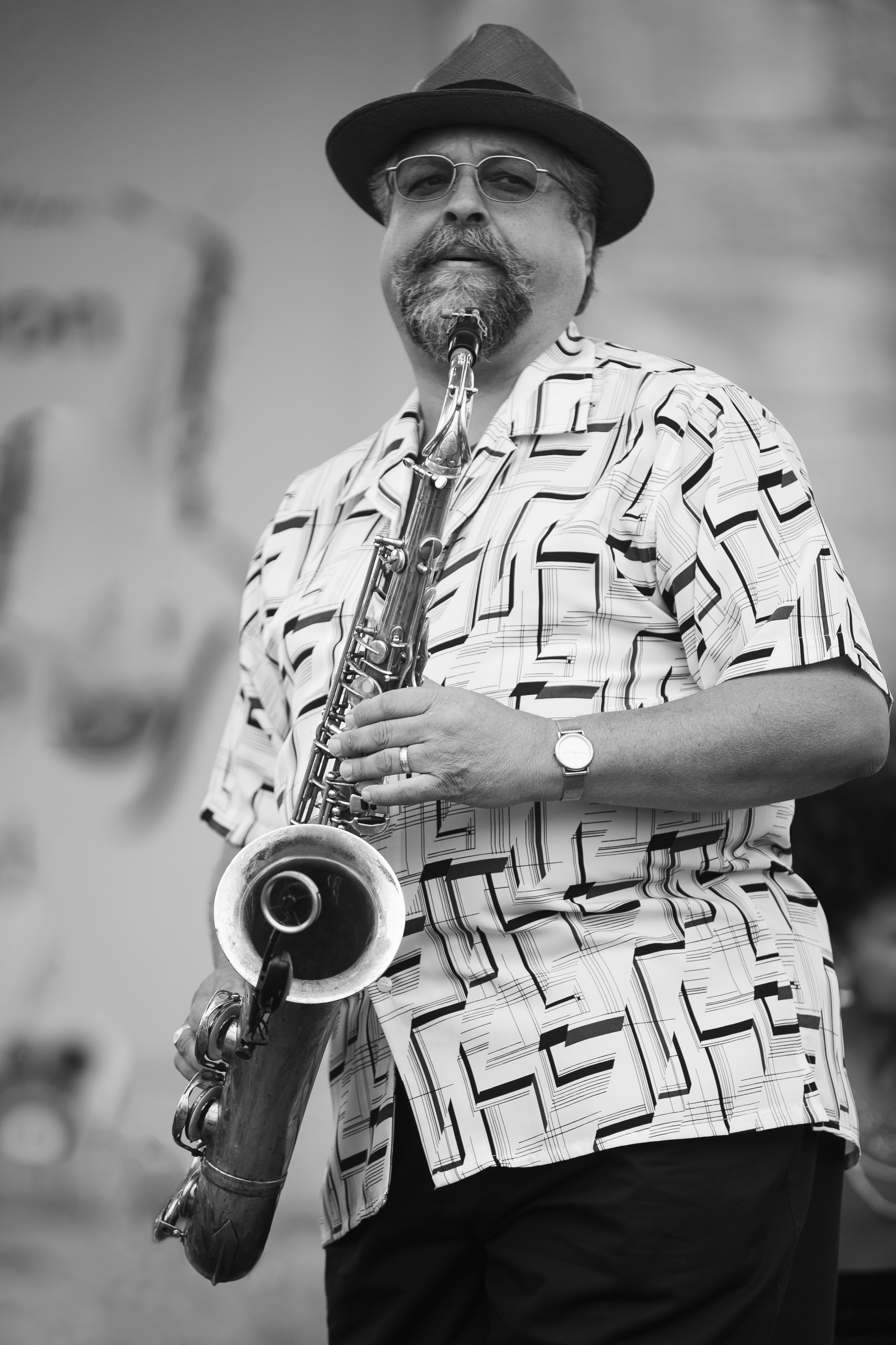
Joe Lovano, George Wein's CareFusion Jazz Festival 55, Newport, Rhode Island, 2009

In 2008 Lovano formed the quintet Us Five with Esperanza Spalding on bass, pianist James Weidman, and two drummers, Francisco Mela and Otis Brown III. Folk Art was an album of compositions by Lovano that the band hoped to interpret in the spirit of the avant-garde jazz and loft jazz of the 1960s. Bird Songs (2011) was a tribute to Charlie Parker. West African guitarist Lionel Loueke appeared on the album Cross Culture (Blue Note, 2013). Lovano played reed and percussion instruments he had collected since the 1970s. Peter Slavov replaced Esperanza Spalding on six tracks, all of them written by Lovano except for "Star Crossed Lovers" by Billy Strayhorn. "The idea [...] wasn't just to play at the same time, but to collectively create music within the music," Lovano wrote in the liner notes to Cross Culture. "Everyone is leading and following," and "the double drummer configuration adds this other element of creativity."

In recent years Lovano has released three records with trumpeter Dave Douglas in a co-led group called Sound Prints. He has also moved over to ECM records, largely adopting the mellow vibe and use of space characteristic of the label. He is a high-profile guest on the acclaimed Arctic Riff (2020) by Polish pianist Marcin Wasilewski.

Lovano has taught at the Berklee College of Music. He taught Jeff Coffin after Coffin was given a NEA Jazz Studies Grant in 1991. He also taught Melissa Aldana, who graduated in 2009.

Downbeat magazine gave its Jazz Album of the Year Award to Lovano for Quartets: Live at the Village Vanguard.

=== Instruments ===
Lovano has played Borgani saxophones since 1991 and exclusively since 1999. He has his own series called Borgani-Lovano, with a pearl silver body and 24K gold keys.

== Film ==
Before becoming the subject of a documentary entirely dedicated to him, Lovano had already appeared as himself in several film and television productions, including Ken Burns's series Jazz (2001), the Leonard Cohen documentary Leonard Cohen: Everybody Knows (2008), the portrait Michel Petrucciani (2011), and Motian in Motion (2020), dedicated to Paul Motian. In 2023, director Franco Maresco released the documentary Lovano Supreme, dedicated to Lovano's life and music. The film premiered at the Locarno Film Festival and was later screened out of competition at the Filmmaker Festival in Milan. Produced by Qoomoon and Eliofilm, with the support of Italy's Ministry of Culture and the Sicilia Film Commission, the film follows a journey by the saxophonist to Sicily, the homeland of his father's family (Alcara Li Fusi) and his mother's family (Cesarò), interweaving footage of the trip with archival material. The project originated in 2017 from a concert held at the Teatro di Verdura in Palermo in tribute to John Coltrane, produced by Marco Milone for the Associazione Lumpen under the artistic direction of Maresco.

== Discography ==
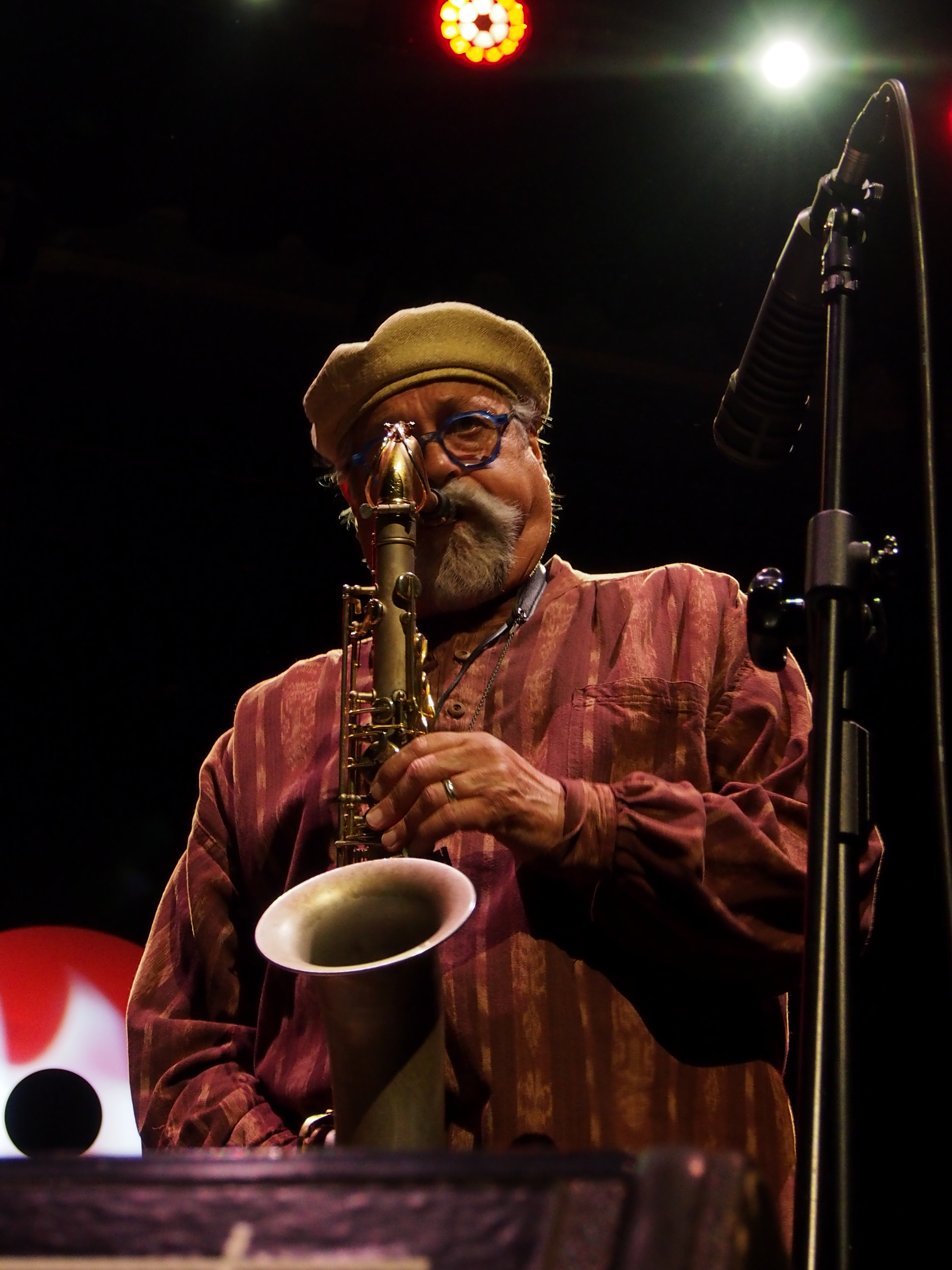
Lovano at Jazz nad Odrą in 2025

=== As leader/co-leader ===
- 1985: Tones, Shapes & Colors (Soul Note, 1985) – live
- 1986: Hometown Sessions (JSL, 1986)
- 1986: Solid Steps (Jazz Club, 1986)
- 1988: Village Rhythm (Soul Note, 1989)
- 1989: Worlds (Evidence, 1989) – live
- 1989: Ten Tales with Aldo Romano (Owl, 1990)
- 1990: Landmarks (Blue Note, 1990)
- 1991: Sounds of Joy (Enja, 1991)
- 1991: From the Soul (Blue Note, 1992)
- 1992: Universal Language (Blue Note, 1993)
- 1993: Tenor Legacy (Blue Note, 1994)
- 1994: Rush Hour (Blue Note, 1995)
- 1994–1995: Quartets: Live at the Village Vanguard (Blue Note, 1995) – live
- 1996: Celebrating Sinatra (Blue Note, 1997)
- 1996: Tenor Time (Somethin' Else, 1997)
- 1997: Flying Colors (Blue Note, 1997) with Gonzalo Rubalcaba
- 1997: Trio Fascination: Edition One (Blue Note, 1998)
- 1998: Friendly Fire (Blue Note, 1999) with Greg Osby
- 1999: 52nd Street Themes (Blue Note, 2000)
- 2000: Grand Slam: Live at the Regatta Bar (Telarc, 2000) with Jim Hall, George Mraz, and Lewis Nash
- 2000: Flights of Fancy: Trio Fascination Edition Two (Blue Note, 2001)
- 2001: Fourth World (Between the Lines, 2001) with James Emery, Judi Silvano and Drew Gress
- 2001: Viva Caruso (Blue Note, 2002)
- 2002: On This Day ... at the Vanguard (Blue Note, 2003) – live
- 2003: I'm All For You (Blue Note, 2004)
- 2004: Joyous Encounter (Blue Note, 2005)
- 2005: Classic! Live at Newport feat. Hank Jones, George Mraz & Lewis Nash (Blue Note, 2016) – live
- 2005: Symphonica (Blue Note, 2008) – live
- 2005: Streams of Expression (Blue Note, 2006)
- 2006: Kids: Live at Dizzy's Club Coca-Cola (Blue Note, 2007) with Hank Jones
- 2008: Folk Art (Blue Note, 2009)
- 2010: Bird Songs with Us Five (Blue Note, 2011)
- 2012: Cross Culture with Us Five (Blue Note, 2013)
- 2013: Sound Prints (Blue Note, 2015) with Dave Douglas
- 2015: The Mezzo Sax Encounter (Cowbell, 2016) with Benjamin Koppel – live
- 2018: Trio Tapestry with Marilyn Crispell & Carmen Castaldi (ECM, 2019)
- 2019: Roma (ECM, 2019) with Enrico Rava
- 2020: Arctic Riff (ECM, 2020) with Marcin Wasilewski Trio
- 2021: Garden of Expression with Marilyn Crispell & Carmen Castaldi (ECM, 2021)
- 2023: Our Daily Bread with Marilyn Crispell & Carmen Castaldi (ECM, 2023)
- 2025: Homage (ECM, 2025) with Marcin Wasilewski Trio
- 2026: Paramount Quartet (ECM, 2026) with. Julian Lage, Asante Santi Debriano & Will Calhoun

=== As a member ===
Saxophone Summit
(With Michael Brecker and Dave Liebman)

- Gathering of Spirits (Telarc, 2004)

ScoLoHoFo
(With John Scofield, Dave Holland and Al Foster)

- Oh! (Blue Note, 2003)

SFJAZZ Collective

- Live 2008: 5th Annual Concert Tour - The Works of Wayne Shorter (SFJAZZ, 2008)[3CD]
- Live 2009: 6th Annual Concert Tour - The Music of McCoy Tyner (SFJAZZ, 2009)[2CD]

=== As sideman ===
With John Abercrombie

- Open Land (ECM, 1999)
- Within a Song (ECM, 2012)

With Marc Johnson

- Shades of Jade (ECM, 2005)
- Swept Away (ECM, 2012)

With Paul Motian

- Psalm with Ed Schuller and Billy Drewes (ECM, 1982)
- The Story of Maryam with Ed Schuller and Jim Pepper (Soul Note, 1984)
- Jack of Clubs with Ed Schuller and Jim Pepper (Soul Note, 1985)
- It Should've Happened a Long Time Ago (ECM, 1985)
- Misterioso with Ed Schuller and Jim Pepper (Soul Note, 1986)
- One Time Out (Soul Note, 1989)
- Monk in Motian (JMT, 1989)
- On Broadway Volume 1 (JMT, 1989)
- Bill Evans (JMT, 1990)
- On Broadway Volume 2 (JMT, 1990)
- Motian in Tokyo (JMT, 1991)
- On Broadway Volume 3 (JMT, 1993)
- Trioism (JMT, 1993)
- At the Village Vanguard (JMT, 1995)
- Sound of Love (JMT, 1995) – live
- I Have the Room Above Her (ECM, 2004)
- Time and Time Again (ECM, 2006)

With John Scofield

- 1989: Time on My Hands (Blue Note, 1990)
- 1990: Meant to Be (Blue Note, 1991)
- 1992: What We Do (Blue Note, 1993)
- 2015: Past Present (Impulse!, 2015)

With Steve Slagle

- New New York, (Omnitone, 2000)
- Alto Manhattan (Panorama, 2017)

With Lonnie Smith

- Afro–desia (Groove Merchant, 1975)
- Keep on Lovin' (Groove Merchant, 1976)

With Bill Stewart

- Snide Remarks (Blue Note, 1995)
- Think Before You Think (Evidence, 1998)

With Roseanna Vitro

- Reaching for the Moon (Chase Music Group, 1991)
- Tropical Postcards (A Records, 2004)

With Yōsuke Yamashita

- Kurdish Dance (Verve, 1992)
- Dazzling Days (Verve, 1993)

With others

- Douglas J. Cuomo, Winston-Salem Symphony a raft, the sky, the wild sea (Blue Cloud Music, 2026)
- Cindy Blackman, Another Lifetime (4Q, 2010)
- Michael Bocian, For This Gift (Gunmar, 1982)
- Furio di Castri, Unknown Voyage (A Témpo, 1985)
- Ray Drummond, Excursion (Arabesque, 1993)
- Peter Erskine, Sweet Soul (Novus/BMG, 1992)
- Antonio Faraò, Evan (Cristal, 2013)
- Sonny Fortune, From Now On (Blue Note, 1996)
- Paul Grabowsky, Tales of time and Space (Sanctuary, 2005)
- Charlie Haden, The Montreal Tapes: Liberation Music Orchestra (Verve, 1999)
- Tom Harrell, Sail Away (Contemporary, 1989)
- Steve Kuhn, Mostly Coltrane (ECM, 2009)
- Abbey Lincoln, Over the Years (Verve, 2000)
- Pat Martino, Think Tank (Blue Note, 2003)
- Masada Quintet, Stolas: Book of Angels Volume 12 (Tzadik, 2009)
- John Patitucci, Remembrance (Concord, 2009)
- Chris Potter, Vertigo (Concord, 1998)
- Dan Silverman, Silverslide (Around the Slide, 2007)
- Tommy Smith, Evolution (Spartacus, 2003)
- Steve Swallow, Real Book (Xtra Watt, 1994)
- McCoy Tyner, Quartet (McCoy Tyner Music, 2007) – live
