= Homage (Joe Lovano album) =

Studio album by Joe Lovano
- Released: April 25, 2025
- Recorded: November 2023
- Studio: Van Gelder Studio, Englewood Cliffs, NJ
- Genre: Jazz
- Length: 39:00
- Label: ECM
- Producer: Manfred Eicher

Joe Lovano chronology
| Our Daily Bread (2023) | Homage (2025) |

Professional ratings
Review scores
| Source | Rating |
|---|---|
| All About Jazz | 4.5/5 stars |
| Allmusic | 3.5/5 stars |
| The Arts Desk | 4/5 stars |
| The Guardian | 4/5 stars |
| Jazzwise | 4/5 stars |
| Tom Hull | B+ |

Homage is a studio album by the American jazz musician Joe Lovano with the Marcin Wasilewski Trio.

== Reception ==
Mike Hobart writing for Jazzwise stated: "The second ECM release from Joe Lovano and Marcin Wasilewski’s piano trio finds the American saxophonist maintaining a strong presence while slotting into the long-established Polish trio’s confident, collective approach. Shapeshifting moods, an inner pulse and interweaving lines define the trio’s aesthetic; Lovano’s gruff tone and fine-tuned timing remain intact." Sebastian Scotney of The Arts Desk wrote: "Joe Lovano has found the ideal context to play with a remarkable spontaneity and freedom. His ethereally light tread here has come an almost unbelievably long way from the heavy-hitting extraversion of an album like “Solid Steps”. But this is a very good place to be. Recommended."

== Track listing ==
All tracks are written by Joe Lovano except track 1 written by Zbigniew Seifert.

| No. | Title | Length |
|---|---|---|
| 1. | "Love in the Garden" | 4:11 |
| 2. | "Golden Horn" | 10:20 |
| 3. | "Homage" | 8:00 |
| 4. | "Giving Thanks" | 2:25 |
| 5. | "This Side — Catville" | 12:00 |
| 6. | "Projection" | 2:03 |
| Total length: | | 39:00 |

== Personnel ==
Band

- Joe Lovano – tenor saxophone
- Marcin Wasilewski – piano
- Slawomir Kurkiewicz – double bass
- Michal Miskiewicz – drums

Production

- Maureen Sickler – recording engineer
- Manfred Eicher – producer
