= 52nd Street Themes =

Studio album by Joe Lovano
- Released: April 25, 2000
- Recorded: November 3–4, 1999
- Studio: Avatar, New York City
- Genre: Jazz
- Length: 67:32
- Label: Blue Note
- Producer: Joe Lovano

Joe Lovano chronology
Friendly Fire (1999)	52nd Street Themes (2000)	Grand Slam: Live at the Regatta Bar (2000)

Professional ratings
Review scores
Source	Rating
AllMusic	4/5 stars
The Globe and Mail	3/5 stars
Los Angeles Times	3/4 stars
Tom Hull	B+

52nd Street Themes is a studio album by the American jazz saxophonist Joe Lovano. It was recorded in early November 1999 and released by the Blue Note label on April 25, 2000. The album won the Grammy Award for Best Large Jazz Ensemble Album. It is named after the jazz standard by Thelonious Monk.

== Background ==
To record the album, Lovano has assembled a medium-sized band of prominent musicians, inviting trumpeter Tim Hagans, trombonist Conrad Herwig, alto saxophonist Steve Slagle, baritonist Gary Smulyan, pianist John Hicks, bassist Dennis Irwin, drummer Lewis Nash, and tenor saxophonists George Garzone and Ralph Lalama. The record also features Cleveland-based jazz composers and arrangers Tadd Dameron and Willie Smith. Lovano initially met them through his father, Tony Lovano, who was also a saxophonist collaborating with both of them. Later, Lovano and Smith played saxophone together in Jack McDuff's band—for which Smith wrote. On 52nd Street Themes Lovano plays only tenor sax.

== Reception ==
Doug Ramsey of Jazz Times stated:

Lovano’s venture in nostalgia is a visit to the music that he heard when he was growing up and becoming a musician in Cleveland. Fortunately for him, and for the listener, what he heard under the aegis of his father were the great jazz artists of the ’40s and ’50s. The compositions the tenor saxophonist explores were written or played by Tadd Dameron, Thelonious Monk, Charlie Parker, Miles Davis, Ernie Henry, Billy Strayhorn and George Gershwin. Lovano and his father’s friend and colleague Willie “Face” Smith arranged seven of them for a nine-piece band... Lovano hopes to establish his nonet as a working, traveling band. The evidence of this first outing favors that idea.

— Doug, Ramsey (September 1, 2000). "Joe Lovano: 52nd Street Themes, Blue Note Records". Jazz Times. jazztimes.com.

David Adler of All About Jazz commented:

While Joe Lovano has played some decidedly non-mainstream music during his career, this record is a powerful reminder of the tenor giant’s debt to the tradition. Still, the music has that unmistakable Lovano edge. Joined by what is in essence a small big band, Lovano pays tribute to the legendary players and composers of the bebop era, with a concentration on the great Tadd Dameron. Willie "Face" Smith (not to be confused with the famed altoist who died in 1967) wrote the orchestrations.

— Adler, David (May 1, 2000). "Joe Lovano Nonet: 52nd Street". All About Jazz. allaboutjazz.com.

== Track listing ==
No.	Title	Writer(s)	Length
1.	"If You Could See Me Now"	Tadd Dameron, Carl Sigman	3:53
2.	"On a Misty Night"	Dameron	5:03
3.	"Sippin' at Bells"	Miles Davis	5:11
4.	"Passion Flower"	Billy Strayhorn	5:04
5.	"Deal"	Willie "Face" Smith	7:13
6.	"The Scene Is Clean"	Dameron	3:48
7.	"Whatever Possess'd Me"	Dameron	3:58
8.	"Charlie Chan"	Lovano	8:07
9.	"Theme for Ernie"	Fred Lacey	5:52
10.	"Tadd's Delight"	Dameron	7:49
11.	"Abstractions on 52nd Street"	Joe Lovano	2:04
12.	"52nd Street Theme"	Thelonious Monk	4:32
13.	"Embraceable You"	George Gershwin, Ira Gershwin	4:58
Total length:			1:07:32

== Personnel ==
- Steve Slagle – alto saxophone
- Joe Lovano – tenor saxophone
- George Garzone – tenor saxophone
- Ralph Lalama – tenor saxophone
- Gary Smulyan – baritone saxophone
- Tim Hagans – trumpet
- Conrad Herwig – trombone
- John Hicks – piano
- Dennis Irwin – bass
- Lewis Nash – drums
