= Rush Hour (Joe Lovano album) =

Studio album by Joe Lovano
- Released: 1995
- Recorded: April 6 – June 12, 1994
- Genre: Jazz
- Length: 63:54
- Label: Blue Note
- Producer: Joe Lovano

Joe Lovano chronology
| Quartets: Live at the Village Vanguard (1995) | Rush Hour (1995) | Celebrating Sinatra (1997) |

Rush Hour is an album by the American jazz saxophonist Joe Lovano, featuring an orchestra arranged and conducted by Gunther Schuller, recorded in 1994 and released on the Blue Note label.

== Reception ==
The AllMusic review by Scott Yanow stated: "This is one of the most exciting jazz releases of 1995... on the basis of this date alone, Lovano must rank as one of the top tenors of the 1990s".

Professional ratings
Review scores
| Source | Rating |
|---|---|
| AllMusic | 4.5/5 stars |
| The Encyclopedia of Popular Music | 5/5 stars |
| Tom Hull | B |
| The Penguin Guide to Jazz Recordings | 4/4 stars |

== Track listing ==
All compositions by Joe Lovano except as indicated

1. "Prelude to a Kiss" (Duke Ellington, Irving Gordon, Irving Mills) – 3:58
2. "Peggy's Blue Skylight" (Charles Mingus) – 3:33
3. "Wildcat" – 2:57
4. "Angel Eyes" (Earl Brent, Matt Dennis) – 5:09
5. "Rush Hour On 23rd Street" (Gunther Schuller) – 8:53
6. "Crespuscle With Nellie" (Thelonious Monk) – 5:43
7. "Lament For M" (Schuller) – 5:41
8. "Topsy Turvy" – 4:27
9. "The Love I Long For" (Howard Dietz, Vernon Duke) – 3:11
10. "Juniper's Garden" – 2:40
11. "Kathline Gray" (Ornette Coleman) – 3:26
12. "Headin' Out Movin' In" (Schuller) – 11:13
13. "Chelsea Bridge" (Billy Strayhorn) – 3:41

== Personnel ==
- Joe Lovano – tenor saxophone, soprano saxophone, bass clarinet, drums, arranger
- Gunther Schuller – arranger
- Jack Walrath – trumpet
- David Taylor – bass trombone, tuba
- John Clark – French horn
- Richard Oatts – flute, tenor saxophone
- Ed Schuller, Mark Helias – bass
- George Schuller – drums
- James Chirillo – guitar
- Judi Silvano – vocals
