= Symphonica (Joe Lovano album) =

Live album by Joe Lovano
- Released: September 2, 2008
- Recorded: November 26, 2005
- Genre: Jazz
- Length: 1:04:36
- Label: Blue Note
- Producer: Joe Lovano, Michael Abene

Joe Lovano chronology
Kids (2007)	Symphonica (2008)	Folk Art (2009)

Professional ratings
Review scores
Source	Rating
Allmusic	4/5 stars
Tom Hull	B+

Symphonica is the 20th album by Joe Lovano to be released on Blue Note Records. The album was released in 2009 and features a live recording of a November 26, 2005, concert.

== Track listing ==
1. "Emperor Jones" – 6:11
2. "Eternal Joy Lovano" – 8:24
3. "Duke Ellington's Sound of Love" – 12:15
4. "Alexander the Great" – 11:51
5. "His Dreams" – 8:04
6. "The Dawn of Time" – 8:26
7. "I'm All for You" – 9:25

== Personnel ==
- Rundfunk Orchestra
- John Goldsby - bass
- Michael Hofmann - bassoon
- Hans Dekker - drums
- Brigitte Schreiner - flute
- Ricardo Almeida - French Horn
- Alfons Gaisbauer - French Horn
- Koji Paul Shigihara - electric guitar, soloist
- Ulla Van Daelen - harp
- Frank Chastenier - keyboards, Hammond organ, piano, soloist
- Egmont Kraus - percussion
- Michael Schmidt - percussion
- Romanus Schöttler - percussion
- Joe Lovano - tenor and soprano saxophone
- Jens Neufang - baritone saxophone
- Olivier Peters - tenor saxophone
- Karolina Strassmayer - alto saxophone, soloist
- Heiner Wiberny - alto saxophone
- Mattis Cederberg - trombone
- Dave Horler - trombone
- Bernt Laukamp - trombone
- Ingo Luis - trombone
- Ludwig Nuss - trombone
- Steve Singer - trombone
- Rob Bruynen - trumpet
- Andy Haderer - trumpet
- John Marshall - trumpet
- Klaus Osterloh - trumpet
- Jürgen Schuster - trumpet
- Johannes Chane Becker - viola
- Bernhard Holker - viola
