= Joyous Encounter =

Studio album by Joe Lovano
- Released: May 10, 2005
- Recorded: September 8–9, 2004
- Studio: Avatar, New York City
- Genre: Jazz
- Length: 1:06:42
- Label: Blue Note 7243 8 63405 2 8
- Producer: Joe Lovano

Joe Lovano chronology
I'm All For You (2004)	Joyous Encounter (2005)	Streams of Expression (2006)

Professional ratings
Review scores
Source	Rating
Allmusic	4.5/5 stars
All About Jazz	4.5/5 stars
The Guardian	3/5 stars
PopMatters	6/10
Tom Hull	B+
The Penguin Guide to Jazz Recordings	3.5/4 stars

Joyous Encounter is a 2005 studio album by American jazz saxophonist Joe Lovano. The album features the same personnel as Lovano's 2004 recording I'm All For You; bassist George Mraz, drummer Paul Motian, and pianist Hank Jones.

== Reception ==
John Fordham, writing for The Guardian commented:: "This new set features more originals by Lovano and the Jones family (one from Hank, three from the late trumpet player Thad) and the same immaculate playing quality. Lovano is at his smoke-ring-blowing best on Autumn in New York, and he amiably swerves and feints on his own fast-bop Bird's Eye View. With Oliver Nelson's obliquely funky, deviously modulating blues Six and Four and John Coltrane's slowly explosive Crescent, the set probably even has a bit more bounce and energy to it than last year's version". Paul Olson of All About Jazz noted: "With the passing of Jones' other brother, Elvin, it's no outrageous statement to call Motian the greatest living jazz drummer: one suspects he could be given only one cymbal—a cracked one at that—and still be the answer to any jazz combo's prayers. Octogenarian Jones plays with confidence, swing, and florid precision. Mraz is the least assuming player here, usually content to hold down the beat, but his melodic, sure-handed solos (as on, say, "Pannonica") make as strong a statement as the other three. Lovano himself plays majestically throughout. This group has phenomenal chemistry."

== Track listing ==
1. "Autumn in New York" (Vernon Duke) – 10:00
2. "Bird's Eye View" (Lovano) – 5:28
3. "Don't Ever Leave Me" (Thad Jones) – 3:45
4. "Alone Together" (Howard Dietz, Arthur Schwartz) – 5:24
5. "Six and Four" (Oliver Nelson) – 5:30
6. "Pannonica" (Thelonious Monk) – 8:05
7. "Consummation" (Hank Jones) – 5:00
8. "Quiet Lady" (Thad Jones) – 5:25
9. "Joyous Encounter" (Lovano) – 4:17
10. "A Child Is Born" (Thad Jones) – 7:08
11. "Crescent" (John Coltrane) – 6:40

== Personnel ==
- Joe Lovano - curved soprano, soprano and tenor saxophone
- Hank Jones - piano
- George Mraz - bass
- Paul Motian - drums
