= Symphonica (video game) =

2012 video game

- Developer(s): iNiS
- Publisher(s): Square Enix
- Platform(s): iOS
- Release: October 18, 2012
- Genre(s): Rhythm game

Symphonica is a rhythm game developed by iNiS, and published by Square Enix. It was released for iOS on October 18, 2012. The game received great reviews among players, and fair reviews among critics. The main reason the game received the low scores from the main critics, like IGN and GameSpot, was that only a small chunk of the story was available upon download. The first 3 episodes are free, but the other 12 episodes are available for 15 dollars. The game discontinued service August 1, 2016 and then was taken off the app store on August 2.

== Presentation ==
The game has a cute anime look, very similar to final fantasy and anime in general. The game lets you take control of a man named Takt, a young conductor who travels to the city of Einsatz, the classical music Capitol, to find his brother, Volt. Takt takes control of the symphony, known as the Fayharmonic, to help him find his brother among the many people in the city, who is looking for the mysterious "Zero Score".
