= I'm All For You =

I'm All for You

Studio album by Joe Lovano
- Released: May 4, 2004
- Recorded: June 11–12, 2003
- Studio: Avatar, New York City
- Genre: Jazz
- Length: 59:12
- Label: Blue Note
- Producer: Joe Lovano

Joe Lovano chronology
On This Day ... Live at The Vanguard (2003)	I'm All for You (2004)	Joyous Encounter (2005)

I'm All For You is a ballads-oriented album by Joe Lovano, which critics have called one of his most enjoyable endeavors. The album features Hank Jones as well as two members who have enjoyed a longstanding relationship with Lovano: George Mraz and Paul Motian.

== Reception ==
Professional ratings
Review scores
Source	Rating
All About Jazz	3.5/5 stars
Allmusic	4.5/5 stars
The Guardian	4/5 stars
Tom Hull	B
The Penguin Guide to Jazz Recordings	3.5/4 stars

David Franklin of JazzTimes wrote "I'm for You: Ballad Songbook (Blue Note) teams him with the veteran pianist Hank Jones (elder brother of Elvin and Thad) and the superb bassist and drummer George Mraz and Paul Motian on a project that explores the possibilities that slower tunes offer to be 'rhythmically diverse and free within the music' while at the same time sustaining the mood of the piece."

== Track listing ==
1. "I'm All for You" - 7:50
2. "Don't Blame Me" - 7:51
3. "Monk's Mood" - 4:01
4. "The Summary (A Suite for Pops)" - 5:16
5. "Stella by Starlight" - 5:47
6. "I Waited for You" - 9:28
7. "Like Someone in Love" - 6:50
8. "Early Autumn" - 7:31
9. "Countdown" - 4:38

== Personnel ==
- Hank Jones - piano
- Joe Lovano - tenor saxophone
- George Mraz - bass
- Paul Motian - drums, cymbals
