= Garden of Expression =

Studio album by Joe Lovano
- Released: January 29, 2021
- Recorded: November 2019
- Studio: Auditorio Stelio Molo RSI; Lugano, Switzerland
- Genre: Jazz
- Length: 48:14
- Label: ECM 2685
- Producer: Manfred Eicher

Joe Lovano chronology
Arctic Riff (2020)	Garden of Expression (2021)	Our Daily Bread (2023)

Professional ratings
Review scores
Source	Rating
Allmusic	4.5/5 stars
All About Jazz	4/5 stars
Financial Times	3/5 stars
The Guardian	4/5 stars
Jazz Journal	5/5 stars
Jazz Trail	A–
Jazzwise	4/5 stars
Morning Star	4/5 stars
The Times	4/5 stars
Tom Hull	B

Garden of Expression is a studio album by American jazz saxophonist Joe Lovano recorded in November 2019 and released on ECM in January 2021. The trio features pianist Marilyn Crispell and percussionist Carmen Castaldi.

== Background ==
This is the second album of the trio. The release contains eight original jazz compositions written by Lovano. He explains the music on the album, "Each of the pieces is a song of expression where rhythm doesn’t dictate the flow. This is not a band that starts from the beat. The momentum is in the melody and the harmonic sequence. And rhythm evolves within each piece in a very free flowing manner."

== Reception ==
Michael Ullman writing for The Arts Fuse stated, "It’s a remarkable group achievement, an intelligently meditative series of pieces that demonstrate not so much the individual instrumental virtuosity of the musicians as their virtuosity as listeners and as suggestive, supportive partners. I’ll call it a series of meditations."

Steve Futterman of The New Yorker wrote, "As his many admirers will attest, the saxophonist Joe Lovano can turn on the juice, blowing hard and strong, whenever necessary. His credentials as a full-blooded jazz swinger and an unfettered free improviser are perfectly in order. His most satisfying work, though, may be on display when he cools his jets and allows his gentle side to come to the fore."

Mike Hobart of Financial Times noted, "Although saxophone is the dominant voice, the collective spirit is high. Crispell closely follows Lovano’s trains of thought with a wide array of voicings and melodic fragments of her own invention and holds one’s attention when taking the lead. With no steady bass, Castaldi can tug the pulse this way and that, decorate phrases and rumble and roar when required."

John Fordham of The Guardian added, "Garden of Expression is about the spaces between sounds as much as sounds themselves—but, as in meditation, they’re spaces that resonate with stories."

Morning Star's review called the album "exemplary, full of spacious and reflective instrumental jazz."

== Track listing ==
All tracks are written by Joe Lovano.

No.	Title	Length
1.	"Chapel Song"	6:05
2.	"Night Creatures"	6:45
3.	"West of the Moon"	5:47
4.	"Garden of Expression"	7:33
5.	"Treasured Moments"	5:03
6.	"Sacred Chant"	3:14
7.	"Dream on That"	3:06
8.	"Zen Like"	10:41
Total length:		48:14

== Personnel ==
- Joe Lovano – gong, tenor and soprano saxophone, tarogato
- Carmen Castaldi – drums, percussion
- Marilyn Crispell – piano
