= Trio Fascination: Edition One =

Studio album by Joe Lovano
- Released: 1998
- Recorded: September 16 and 17, 1997
- Genre: Jazz, post bop
- Length: 65:51
- Label: Blue Note
- Producer: Joe Lovano

Joe Lovano chronology
Flying Colors (1997)	Trio Fascination: Edition One (1998)	Friendly Fire (1999)

Trio Fascination: Edition One is an album by the American jazz saxophonist Joe Lovano, recorded in September 1997 and released the following year on the Blue Note label.

== Reception ==
The AllMusic review by Alex Henderson stated: "Heard on tenor, alto and soprano, the saxophonist never fails to command our attention on this consistently heartfelt and captivating release".

Professional ratings
Review scores
Source	Rating
AllMusic	4/5 stars
Tom Hull	A−
The Penguin Guide to Jazz Recordings	4/4 stars

== Track listing ==
All compositions by Joe Lovano except as indicated

1. "New York Fascination" - 3:06
2. "Sanctuary Park" - 6:44
3. "Eternal Joy" - 7:35
4. "Ghost of a Chance" (Victor Young, Ned Washington, Bing Crosby) - 4:54
5. "Studio Rivbea" - 7:10
6. "Cymbalism" - 4:57
7. "Impressionistic" - 9:34
8. "Villa Paradisco" - 7:13
9. "4 on the Floor" - 5:11
10. "Days of Yore" - 9:27

== Personnel ==
- Joe Lovano – tenor, soprano, alto, and straight alto saxophone, alto clarinet
- Dave Holland – bass
- Elvin Jones – drums
