= Kenny Werner =

American jazz pianist and composer (born 1951)

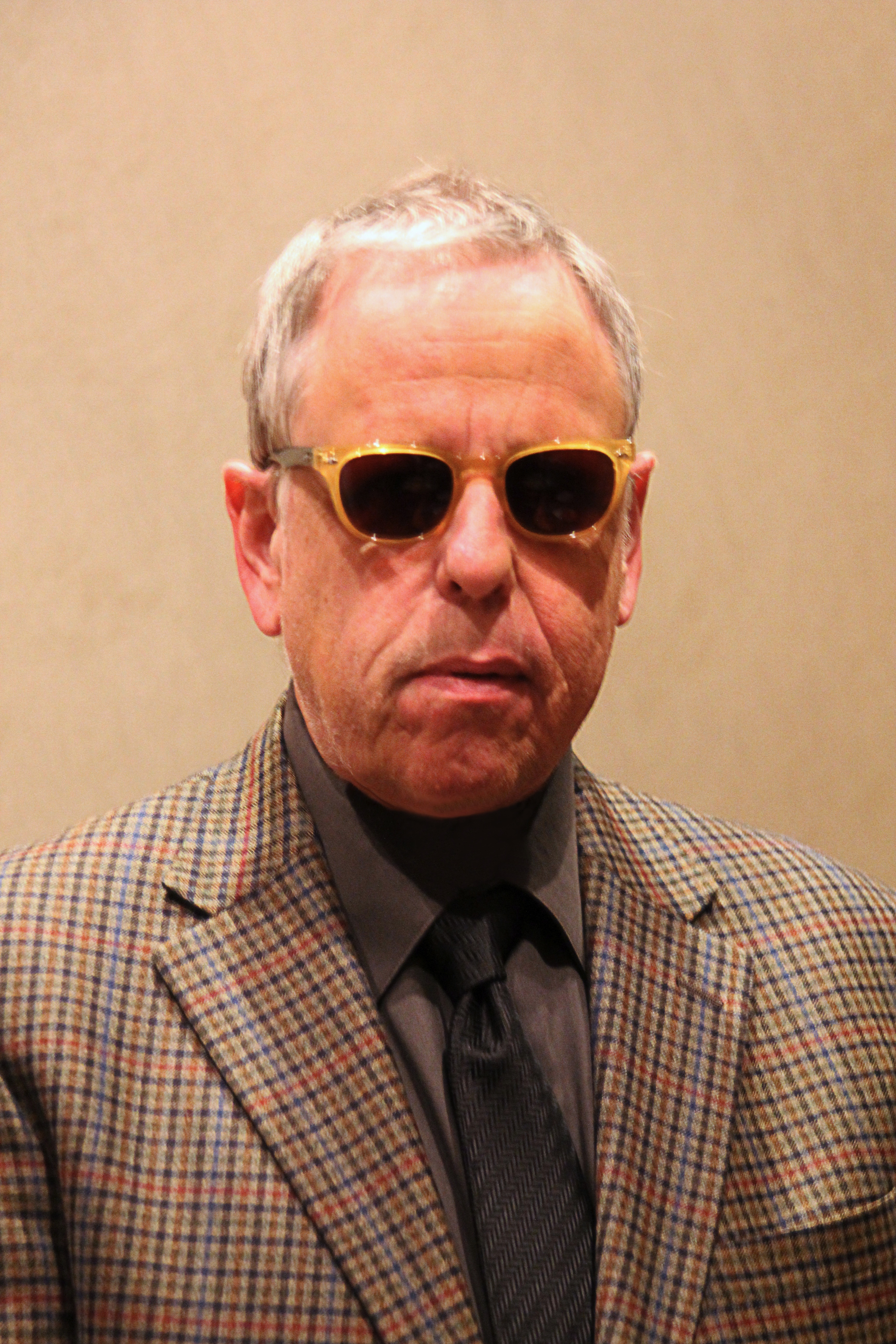

Background information
- Born: November 19, 1951 (age 74); Brooklyn, New York, U.S.
- Genres: Jazz
- Occupation: Musician
- Instrument: Piano
- Years active: 1961–present
- Labels: Concord, RCA, Double-Time, Half Note, Justin Time
- Website: www.kennywerner.com

Kenny Werner (born November 19, 1951) is an American jazz pianist, composer, and author.

== Early life ==
Born in Brooklyn, New York, on November 19, 1951, and then growing up in Oceanside, Long Island, Werner began playing and performing at a young age, first appearing on television at the age of 11. Although he studied classical piano as a child, he enjoyed playing anything he heard on the radio and improvisation was his true calling. In high school and his first years of college he attended the Manhattan School of Music as a classical piano major.

His aptitude for improvisation led him to the Berklee College of Music in 1970, where he met and studied with his first piano/spiritual teacher, Madame Chaloff. From Boston, Werner traveled to Brazil with the saxophonist Victor Assis Brasil. There he met Assis's twin brother, Brazilian pianist Joao Assis Brasil. His studies with Joao and Madame Chaloff would lead to the writing of the book Effortless Mastery.

== Later life and career ==
Werner started his own trio in 1981 with drummer Tom Rainey and bassist Ratzo Harris. The Kenny Werner Trio matured for fourteen years, touring in America and Europe and recording four albums along the way.

In the 1980s, he became the pianist for The Thad Jones/Mel Lewis Orchestra (now known as the Vanguard Jazz Orchestra). Challenged by Lewis and Bob Brookmeyer to write for the band, he produced his first compositions and arrangements for jazz orchestra, consequently leading him to write for the bands in Europe including the Cologne, Danish, and Stockholm Jazz Orchestras, the Umo Jazz Orchestra of Finland and several times as the guest composer and soloist with the Metropole Orchestra of Holland. Since then Werner has had commissions to write for large ensembles such as jazz orchestras, full orchestras and most in 2007, wind ensemble, choir and string quartet as featured on his album No Beginning, No End (2009).

Werner continued to play duo with Toots Thielemans for seventeen years. They recorded an album together and Werner received a Grammy nomination for his composition, "Inspiration." For twenty years, he was musical director for Broadway star Betty Buckley. They made six albums together and she has sung his arrangements for small bands and orchestras. He and Joe Lovano have recorded and collaborated on each other's projects for over 40 years.

During the 1990s, Werner made three award-winning albums: Kenny Werner at Maybeck, Concord Duo Series, Vol. 10, and Live at Visiones.

In 2000, Werner formed a trio with Ari Hoenig on drums and Johannes Weidenmueller on bass, with Werner acting as composer, arranger, and pianist. In 2007, he released his first album for Blue Note, Lawn Chair Society, featuring Chris Potter, Dave Douglas, Scott Colley, and Brian Blade.

Werner was awarded a Guggenheim Fellowship for the album No Beginning No End (Half Note, 2010), which explored tragedy and loss, death and transition, and the path from one lifetime to the next. The album featured Joe Lovano, Judi Silvano, and over seventy musicians.

In 1996, Werner wrote a book about the psychological aspects of music in Effortless Mastery – Liberating the Master Musician Within. He lectured to support the book.

== Awards ==
- Grants, National Endowment for the Arts, 1985, '87, '93, '95
- Guggenheim Fellowship, 2010
- Distinguished Artist Award for Composition, New Jersey Council of the Arts, "Kandinsky"

== Discography ==
=== As leader ===
- The Piano Music of Bix Beiderbecke, Duke Ellington, George Gershwin, James P. Johnson (Finnadar, 1978)
- Beyond the Forest of Mirkwood (Enja, 1980)
- Introducing the Trio (Sunnyside, 1989)
- Uncovered Heart (Sunnyside, 1990)
- Sail Away with Tom Harrell (Musidisc, 1991)
- Press Enter (Sunnyside, 1992)
- Meditations (SteepleChase, 1993)
- Gu-Ru (TCB, 1994)
- At Maybeck (Concord, 1994)
- Paintings (Pioneer, 1994)
- Live at Visiones (Concord Jazz, 1995)
- Chris Potter/Kenny Werner (Concord Jazz, 1996)
- A Delicate Balance (RCA Victor, 1997)
- Remembrance (SYDA, 1998)
- Unprotected Music (Double-Time, 1998)
- Beauty Secrets (RCA/BMG, 1999)
- Hope with Dave Schroeder (Laurel Tree, 2000)
- Heart to Heart with Betty Buckley (KO, 2000)
- Old Friends (Laurel Tree, 2000)
- Toots Thielemans & Kenny Werner (Verve/North Sea, 2001)
- Form and Fantasy (Double-Time, 2001)
- Celebration with Alex Riel (Stunt, 2001)
- Beat Degeneration Vol. 2 (Night Bird Music, 2002)
- Naked in the Cosmos (Jazz 'n' Pulz, 2002)
- Unleemited with Lee Konitz (Sunnyside/Owl, 2001)
- Tchat with Rémi Bolduc (Justin Time, 2003)
- Peace (Half Note, 2004)
- Democracy (Half Note, 2006)
- Lawn Chair Society (Blue Note, 2007)
- Delirium Blues Project with Roseanne Vitro (Half Note, 2008)
- Play Ballads (Stunt, 2008)
- With a Song in My Heart (Venus, 2008)
- Walden (Cowbell Music, 2009)
- New York Love Songs (OutNote, 2010)
- No Beginning No End (Half Note, 2010)
- Institute of Higher Learning (Half Note, 2011)
- Balloons (Half Note, 2011)
- Me, Myself & I (Justin Time, 2012)
- Breaking Borders #1 (Cowbell Music, 2012)
- Celestial Anomaly with Janis Mann (Pancake, 2013)
- Collaboration with Hein Van de Geyn, Hans Van Oosterhout (Challenge, 2013)
- Coalition (Half Note, 2014)
- Poesia with Joyce Moreno (Pirouet, 2015)
- The Melody (Pirouet, 2015)
- Animal Crackers (Pirouet, 2017)
- The Space (Pirouet, 2018)
- Solo in Stuttgart (SWR, 2019)
- Church On Mars (Newvelle, 2019)
- Somewhere with Peter Eldridge (Rosebud Music, 2019)
- Dreams Of Flying with Janis Mann (Pancake, 2020)
- Voice & Piano with Janis Mann (Pancake, 2025)

=== As sideman ===
With Mel Lewis Jazz Orchestra

- 20 Years at the Village Vanguard (Atlantic, 1986)
- Soft Lights and Hot Music (Musicmasters, 1988)
- The Definitive Thad Jones (Musicmasters, 1989)
- The Definitive Thad Jones Volume 2 (Musicmasters, 1990)
- To You: A Tribute to Mel Lewis (Musicmasters, 1991)

With Joe Lovano

- Tones, Shapes & Colors (Soul Note, 1986)
- Village Rhythm (Soul Note, 1989)
- Landmarks (Blue Note, 1991)
- Universal Language (Blue Note, 1993)
- Celebrating Sinatra (Blue Note, 1997)

With Archie Shepp

- I Know About the Life (Sackville, 1981)
- Soul Song (Enja, 1982)
- Down Home New York (Soul Note, 1984)
- The Good Life (Varrick, 1984)

With others

- Rez Abbasi, Third Ear (Cathexis, 1995)
- Harry Allen, I Love Mancini (BMG/Novus, 2002)
- Jamie Baum, Sight Unheard (GM, 1996)
- Alan Baylock, Two Seconds to Midnight (Sea Breeze, 2003)
- Jane Ira Bloom, Art and Aviation (Arabesque, 1992)
- Don Braden, The Open Road (Double-Time, 1996)
- Randy Brecker, Randy Pop! (Piloo, 2015)
- Betty Buckley, With One Look (Sterling, 1994)
- Betty Buckley, Stars and the Moon (Concord, 2001)
- Scott Colley, Portable Universe (Free Lance, 1996)
- Duduka Da Fonseca, Samba Jazz Fantasia (Art Music, 2002)
- Santi Debriano, Soldiers of Fortune (Free Lance, 1990)
- Peter Erskine, Sweet Soul (Novus/RCA 1992)
- Peter Erskine, Behind Closed Doors Vol. 1 (Fuzzy Music, 1998)
- Robin Eubanks, Karma (JMT, 1991)
- Chico Freeman, Tangents (Elektra Musician, 1984)
- George Garzone, Moodiology (NYC, 1999)
- George Garzone, Night of My Beloved (Venus, 2008)
- Jamey Haddad, Names (Ananda, 1983)
- Tom Harrell, Labyrinth (RCA Victor, 1996)
- Jerome Harris, Algorithms (Minor Music, 1986)
- Christopher Hollyday, And I'll Sing Once More (Novus, 1992)
- Joyce Moreno, Music Inside (Verve Forecast, 1990)
- Joyce Moreno, Language and Love (Verve, 1991)
- Gary Keller, Blues for an Old New Age (Double-Time, 1999)
- Nigel Kennedy, (Blue Note, Sessions (Blue Note, 2006)
- Lee Konitz, Zounds (Soul Note, 1992)
- Anders Koppel, Everything Is Subject to Change (Cowbell Music, 2012)
- Anders Koppel, Past Present Future (Cowbell Music, 2017)
- Michel Legrand, Legrand (Nougaro Capitol/Blue Note, 2005)
- Dave Liebman, Fire (Jazzline, 2018)
- Joe Locke, Present Tense (Steeplechase, 1990)
- Andy McKee, One World (Consolidated Artists, 2002)
- Vince Mendoza, Nights On Earth Art of Groove (MIG, 2011)
- Charles Mingus, Something Like a Bird (Atlantic, 1980)
- Ferenc Nemeth, Triumph (Dreamers Collective, 2012)
- Ed Neumeister, Ed Neumeister Quintet (Timescraper, 1997)
- Judy Niemack, Straight Up (Free Lance, 1993)
- Judy Niemack, ...Night and the Music (Free Lance, 1997)
- Octurn, Round (W.E.R.F., 2000)
- Jim Pepper, Comin' and Goin ' (Europa, 1983)
- Dave Pietro, Forgotten Dreams (A Records, 1994)
- Dave Pietro, Wind Dance (A Records, 1998)
- Chris Potter, Concentric Circles (Concord, 1994)
- Chris Potter, Concord Duo Series Volume Ten (Concord Jazz, 1994)
- Mike Richmond, New Blues (Nuba/Karonte, 1993)
- Alex Riel, The Riel Deal (Stunt, 1995)
- Alex Riel, Rielatin (Stunt, 2000)
- Ali Ryerson, Portraits in Silver (Concord Jazz, 1995)
- Loren Schoenberg, S'Posin' (Jazz Heritage, 1991)
- Maria Schneider, Evanescence (Enja, 1994)
- Judi Silvano, Dancing Voices (JSL, 1992)
- Tessa Souter, Nights of Key Largo (Venus, 2008)
- Special EFX, Global Village (GRP, 1992)
- Andy Statman, Between Heaven & Earth (Shanachie, 1997)
- Toots Thielemans, The Live Takes Vol. 1 (Narada, 2000)
- Toots Thielemans, One More for the Road (Verve, 2006)
- Roseanna Vitro, Passion Dance (Telarc, 1996)
- Roseanna Vitro, Catchin' Some Rays (Telarc, 1997)
- Nils Wogram, New York Conversations (Mons, 1994)

== Bibliography ==
- "Channeling Music", Organica, Spring, 1988
- "Play for the Right Reasons", Organica, Winter 1990
- "Hostile Triads – The Piano Stylist & Jazz Workshop", April–May 1991
- Effortless Mastery, Jamey Aebersold Jazz, Inc., 1996
- "Zen and the Art of Jazz", Down Beat, 2015 (four-article series)
- Becoming the Instrument, Sweet Lo Press, January 2022
