= Judi Silvano =

American jazz singer and composer (born 1951)

- Born: Judith Silverman; May 8, 1951 (age 75); Philadelphia, Pennsylvania, U.S.
- Genres: Jazz
- Occupations: Singer, composer
- Years active: 1980–present
- Labels: JSL, Zoho Music
- Website: www.judisilvano.com

Judi Silvano (born May 8, 1951) is a jazz singer and composer.

== Career ==
Before attending college she studied flute, piano, and dance. She graduated from Temple University in Philadelphia with a degree in music and dance. She is a scholar of Sheila Jordan and of Jeanne Lee. For her album Woman's Work, she researched music by women composers. Her own compositions have been played on stages in New York City and Europe. She has collaborated with Mal Waldron, Kenny Werner, and Bill Frisell. When she married saxophonist Joe Lovano, she changed her last name from Silverman to Silvano. Since 2011 she has been studying painting at the Wallkill River School of Art in Montgomery, New York, and has exhibited her work in galleries.

== Discography ==
- Dancing Voices (JSL, 1992)
- Vocalise (Blue Note, 1997)
- Songs I Wrote or Wish I Did (JSL 2000)
- Riding a Zephyr with Mal Waldron (Soul Note, 2002)
- Let Yourself Go (Zoho Music, 2004)
- Women's Work (JSL, 2007)
- Live Takes (JSL, 2008)
- Indigo Moods (Jazzed Media, 2012)
- My Dance with Michael Abene (JSL, 2014)
- Lessons Learned (Unit, 2018)

=== As guest ===
With Joe Lovano

- Worlds (Evidence, 1989)
- Universal Language (Blue Note, 1992)
- Rush Hour (Blue Note, 1994)
- Celebrating Sinatra (Blue Note, 1996)
- Viva Caruso (Blue Note, 2002)

With others

- For This Gift, Michael Bocian (GunMar, 1983)
- Comin' and Goin' , Jim Pepper (Atlantic, 1985)
- Fourth World, James Emery (New Life, 2002)
- Reflections, Adam Kolker (Sunnyside, 2011)
- Listen to This, Judi Silvano and Bruce Arnold (Muse-Eek, 2016)
- Cloudwalking, Judi Silvano and Bruce Arnold (Muse-Eek, 2018)
