= James Weidman =

American jazz musician

James Edward Weidman Jr. , (born July 23, 1953, in Youngstown, Ohio) is an American jazz pianist.

Weidman's father was a saxophonist who led his own band. He began playing piano when he was eight years old and eventually became electric organist in his father's group. He attended Youngstown State University, taking his bachelor's degree in 1976, and moved to New York City in 1978. He worked with Pepper Adams, Cecil Payne, Sonny Stitt, and Bobby Watson, then became Abbey Lincoln's pianist in 1982, an association that would continue into the early 1990s. He also worked with Steve Coleman and Jay Hoggard later in the 1980s. In the 1990s he worked with Cassandra Wilson, Talib Kibwe, Kevin Mahogany, Belden Bullock, and Marvin "Smitty" Smith.
