= Dreyfus Night in Paris =

2003 live album on the Dreyfus Jazz label

Live album by Marcus Miller, Michel Petrucciani, Biréli Lagrène, Lenny White & Kenny Garrett
- Released: 2003
- Recorded: July 7, 1994
- Venue: Palais De Sports, Paris, France
- Genre: Jazz; fusion
- Length: 50:27
- Label: Dreyfus Jazz; FDM 36652-2
- Producer: Francis Dreyfus

Marcus Miller chronology
The Ozell Tapes (2002)	Dreyfus Night in Paris (2003)	Silver Rain (2005)

Michel Petrucciani chronology
Conversation with Tony Petrucciani (2001)	Dreyfus Night in Paris (2003)	Piano Solo: The Complete Concert in Germany (2007)

Dreyfus Night in Paris is a live album by bassist Marcus Miller, pianist Michel Petrucciani, guitarist Biréli Lagrène, drummer Lenny White, and saxophonist Kenny Garrett. It was recorded on July 7, 1994 at the Palais De Sports (Dôme de Paris) in Paris by Francis Dreyfus for the label Dreyfus Jazz, and released in 2003.

The tracks "Tutu" and "The King Is Gone" were written by Miller—the former for the album of the same name under trumpeter Miles Davis in 1986, and the latter as a tribute to Davis, originally for his own 1993 album The Sun Don't Lie.

== Reception ==
Professional ratings
Review scores
Source	Rating
AllMusic	4/5 stars

Scott Yanow, writing for AllMusic, stated, "Although the three selections are each quite extended, they hold one's interest throughout. Excellent music."

JazzTimes's Bill Milkowski wrote that "this live outing features an all-star ensemble stretching out on just three songs", adding that "While Petrucciani had previously played with drummer White, ... the pianist had never before played with either Lagrene, Miller or Garrett, which makes this 10-year-old document all the more rare."

Eric J. Iannelli of All About Jazz concluded, "No, Dreyfus Night in Paris isn't as essential as the Massey Hall releases [1953]. But, like those famed recordings, it does have a multifarious appeal—something for the swingers, something for the funk addicts, something for the fusion crowd, something for the traditionalists—that suggests it will be able to transcend labels and find its way into many ears."

== Track listing ==
No.	Title	Writer(s)	Length
1.	"Tutu"	Marcus Miller	16:36
2.	"The King Is Gone"	Miller	17:19
3.	"Looking Up"	Michel Petrucciani	16:32
Total length:			50:27

== Personnel ==
Musicians

- Marcus Miller – electric bass, bass clarinet (2)
- Michel Petrucciani – piano, keyboard
- Biréli Lagrène – guitar
- Lenny White – drums
- Kenny Garrett – alto and soprano saxophones

Technical

- Francis Dreyfus – producer
- Roger Roche – recording engineer
- René Ameline – mastering
- Benjamin Joubert – mastering assistant
- Renaud Liqult – artwork, design
- Sophie Le Roux – photography
