= Live & More (Marcus Miller album) =

Live album by Marcus Miller
- Released: March 5, 1997
- Recorded: 1996
- Genre: Jazz
- Length: 72:42
- Label: Dreyfus Jazz, Victor, GRP Records
- Producer: Marcus Miller, David "The Cat" Ward

Marcus Miller chronology
Tales (1995)	Live & More (1997)	M² (2001)

Professional ratings
Review scores
Source	Rating
Allmusic	4.5/5 stars
Philadelphia Daily News	(B−)

Live & More is a live album by Marcus Miller released in 1997. This album peaked at No. 6 on the US Billboard Top Contemporary Jazz Albums chart and No. 8 on the US Billboard Top Jazz Albums chart.

== Critical reception ==
Al Hunter Jr. of the Philadelphia Daily News, in a B− review remarked, "On Live & More, Miller stays close to his funk roots...The instrumental arrangements throughout the CD are strong (although a close listen to Panther reveals two obvious places where the song was edited). But the vocals by Hathaway and Miller are thin and fail to reach the same high level as the instrumentation."

Jonathan Widran of Allmusic, in a 4.5/5 star review proclaimed, "While Miller plays everything but the kitchen sink himself (bass, bass clarinet, guitar, and vocoder), the genuine excitement here emerges from giving space to and interacting and stretching out with his sea of all-stars."

== Track listing ==
All tracks composed by Marcus Miller; except where noted.

1. "Intro" – 2:26
2. "Panther" – 9:06
3. "Tutu" – 10:59
4. "Funny (All She Needs Is Love)" – 12:42 (Marcus Miller, Boz Scaggs)
5. "Strange Fruit" – 3:56 (Lewis Allan)
6. "Summertime" – 5:33 (Ira Gershwin, George Gershwin, DuBose Heyward)
7. "Maputo" – 8:17
8. "People Make The World Go 'Round" – 9:04 (Thom Bell, Linda Creed)
9. "Sophie" – 4:53
10. "Jazz In The House" – 5:46

== Personnel ==
- Marcus Miller – bass, bass clarinet, guitar, keyboards, soprano saxophone, vocals, vocoder
- Hiram Bullock – guitar
- David Delhomme – keyboards, guitar
- Dean Brown – guitar
- Bernard Wright – keyboards
- Lalah Hathaway – vocals
- Kenny Garrett – alto saxophone, soprano saxophone
- Everette Harp – tenor saxophone
- Roger Byam – tenor saxophone
- Michael "Patches" Stewart – trumpet
- David "E-Man" Ward – additional keyboards, guitar, percussion, sound design
- Poogie Bell – drums
- Lenny White – additional drums
- Drew Zingg – additional guitar
