= Free (Marcus Miller album) =

Studio album by Marcus Miller
- Released: July 2, 2007
- Studio: Hannibal Studios and Threshold Sound + Vision (Santa Monica, California); Westlake Studios and The Village (Los Angeles, California); Bill Schnee Studios (North Hollywood, California); Care River Studios (Sherman Oaks, California); Titan Music and Film Works (Downey, California); Fantasy Studios (Berkeley, California); Bobby Sparks Enterprises (Sunnyvale, Texas); Powerhouse Studios (Seattle, Washington); Hiatus Studios and Gwizmon Studios (New York City, New York); Braiduss Studio (Aigle, Switzerland)
- Genre: Jazz fusion
- Length: 57:36
- Label: Dreyfus Jazz, JVC
- Producer: Marcus Miller; David Isaac

Marcus Miller chronology
Silver Rain (2005)	Free (2007)	Marcus (2008)

Free is a studio album by jazz bassist Marcus Miller, released in 2007. Japanese special version includes music videos in DVD-Video.

== Background ==
The album's title track is a cover of the 1977 Deniece Williams song. UK soul singer Corinne Bailey Rae provided lead vocals. "Higher Ground" is a song originally recorded by Stevie Wonder, and "What Is Hip" was originally performed by Tower of Power. "Jean Pierre" was originally performed by Miles Davis on We Want Miles, 1982. Blues singer Keb' Mo' sings and co-wrote with Marcus Miller the track entitled "Milky Way".

The album's US version has not only a new title, Marcus, but the tracks have been remixed/recut. Four additional tracks have been added to the album as well.

== Track listing ==
All tracks written by Marcus Miller, except where indicated.

1. "Blast" - 5:43
2. "Funk Joint" - 5:42
3. "Free" (Deneice Williams, Hank Redd, Nathan Watts, Susaye Greene) - 5:39
4. "Strum" - 5:40
5. "Milky Way" (Miller, Kevin R. Moore) - 5:38
6. "Pluck (Interlude)" - 3:55
7. "When I Fall in Love" (Edward Heyman, Victor Young) - 5:24
8. "Jean Pierre" (Miles Davis) - 7:26
9. "Higher Ground" (Stevie Wonder) - 6:30
10. "What Is Hip?" (David Garibaldi, Emilio Castillo, Stephen M. Kupka) - 5:58

Japanese special version's disk 2 [DVD-Video]

1. "Blast"
2. "Higher Ground"
3. "When I Fall In Love"
4. "Funk Joint"
5. "Steveland"
6. "Jean Pierre"

== Personnel ==
- Marcus Miller – keyboards (1), programming (1, 3), sitar (1, 6), bass guitar (1–6, 8–10), organ (2, 7, 9–10), guitars (2), bass clarinet (2, 6, 7, 10), Rhodes electric piano (3, 6–8), synthesizers (3, 5–7), clavinet (4, 9), string synthesizer (4), Moog synthesizer (4), percussion (4), Wurlitzer electric piano (5), acoustic guitar (5), guitar riff (5), guitar solo (5), drum programming (5), fretless bass (7), tambourine (10), B♭ clarinet (10)
- Bobby Sparks – synthesizers (1–2, 8–9), clavinet (3, 6), organ (3, 5), Moog bass (8)
- Bernard Wright – additional synthesizers (1), organ licks (2)
- Paul Jackson Jr. – acoustic guitar (3–4, 6)
- Keb' Mo – guitar (5), lead vocals (5), backing vocals (5), sample vocals (6)
- Poogie Bell – drums (1–2, 4, 8–10)
- Gregoire Maret – harmonica (1–2, 4, 7–9)
- Keith Anderson – tenor saxophone (1–2, 8–9)
- David Sanborn – alto saxophone (3, 10)
- Michael "Patches" Stewart – trumpet (1–2, 8–9), flugelhorn (3)
- Lalah Hathaway – vocals (1), "ba da yap" vocals (3)
- Andrea Braido – guitars (1)
- Julian Miller – percussion programming (1)
- Corinne Bailey Rae – lead vocals (3), backing vocals (3)
- Kenya Ivey – additional backing vocals (3)
- Tavia Ivey – additional backing vocals (3)
- Ulisa Ivey – additional backing vocals (3)
- Tom Scott – tenor saxophone (4)
- Gussie Miller – backing vocals (5)
- Jason Thomas – drums (6)
- Teddy Campbell – drums (7)
- Chester Thompson – organ (10)

== Production ==
- Harry Miller – executive producer
- Marcus Miller – executive producer, producer
- Harold Goode – executive producer, associate producer
- David Isaac – co-producer
- Bibi Green – production supervisor, artist management
- Michele Aristy – production coordinator
- Lamont Boles – executive director
- Samuel Le Branchu – art direction, design
- Mark Schafer – photography
- Marie Flemmings – styling
- Deborah Lippmann – manicurist

Technical credits

- Bob Ludwig – mastering at Gateway Mastering & DVD (Portland, Maine)
- Taka Honda – mixing (1, 6, 10), recording, technical supervisor
- Goh Hotoda – mixing (2, 4)
- David Isaac – mixing (3, 5, 9), recording
- Bill Schnee – mixing (7)
- Dennis Thompson – mixing (8), additional recording
- Marcus Miller – recording, Logic Pro editing
- Andrea Braido – additional recording
- Janek Gwizdala – additional recording
- Stephen Hart – additional recording
- Dennis Moody – additional recording
- Jared Nugent – additional recording
- Vanessa Parr – additional recording
- Michael Powers – additional recording
- Antonio Resendiz – additional recording
- Dean Sharenow – additional recording
- Rod Steger – additional recording
- Ursula Arevalo – assistant engineer
- Darius Fong – assistant engineer
- Todd Steinhauer – assistant engineer
- Noel Zancanella – assistant engineer
