= Solo Live =

Solo Live may refer to:

- Solo Live (David Murray album), 1980
- Solo Live (Michel Petrucciani album), 1998
