= Dutronc =

Dutronc is a surname. Notable people with the surname include:

- Jacques Dutronc (born 1943), French pop and chanson singer-songwriter
- Thomas Dutronc (born 1973), French musician and the only son of the above
