= Avitabile =

Avitabile is a surname. Notable people with the surname include:

- Enzo Avitabile (born 1955), Italian saxophonist, composer, and singer-songwriter
- Franck Avitabile (born 1971), French jazz pianist
- Paolo Avitabile (1791–1850), Italian soldier, mercenary, and adventurer
