= Palle Danielsson =

Swedish jazz double bassist (1946–2024)

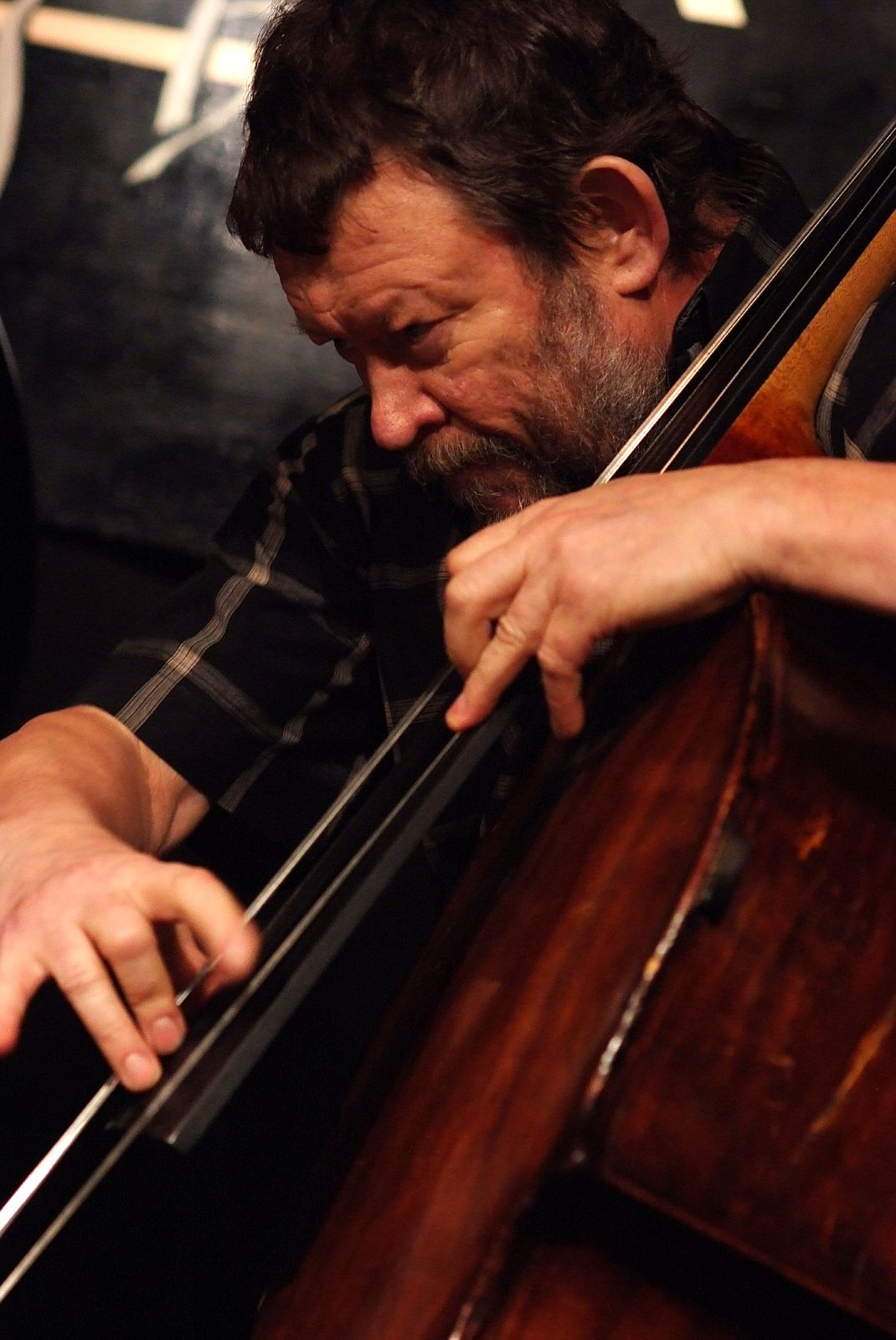
- Danielsson in 2008

Background information
- Born: Nils Paul Danielsson; 15 October 1946; Stockholm, Sweden
- Died: 18 May 2024 (aged 77)
- Genres: Free jazz
- Occupations: Musician, composer
- Instrument: Double bass

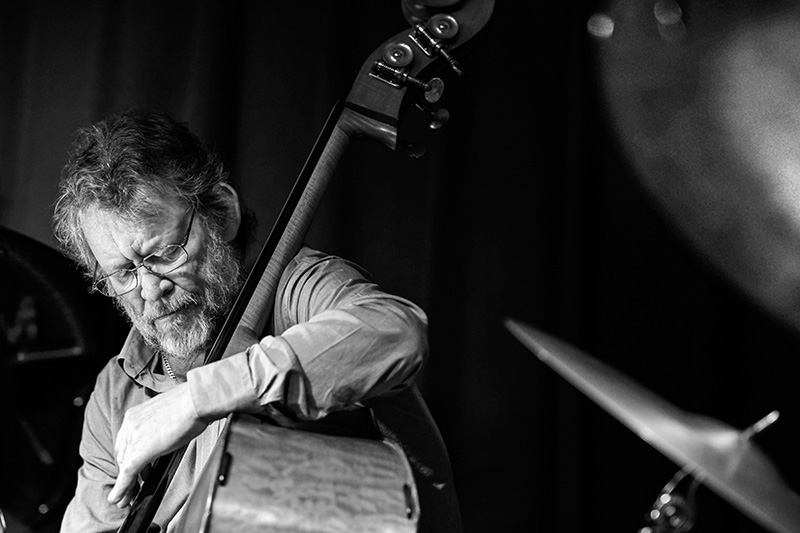
Palle Danielsson in Aarhus, Denmark 2017

Nils Paul "Palle" Danielsson (15 October 1946 – 18 May 2024) was a Swedish jazz double bassist born in Stockholm, Sweden. From 1974 to 1979, he was a member of Keith Jarrett's quartet. He was the brother of pianist Monica Dominique. Danielsson died on 18 May 2024, at the age of 77.

== Career ==
Danielsson's first instrument was the harmonica, which he started playing at the age of two. By age eight he was playing violin, which he continued to play and study for about five years. Around this time he became interested in jazz and started to play double bass. When he was fifteen, Danielsson was playing professionally. Having studied at the Stockholm Royal Academy of Music (1962–1966), he began to play with Scandinavian musicians such as Eje Thelin, Bobo Stenson, and Jan Garbarek and took up international collaborations, for example with Lee Konitz and Steve Kuhn.

Danielsson worked with Bill Evans, Keith Jarrett, Kenny Wheeler, Geri Allen, Michel Petrucciani, Charles Lloyd, Peter Erskine, Elvin Jones, Ben Webster, Charlie Shavers, George Russell, Albert Mangelsdorff, Enrico Rava, Collin Walcott, Tomasz Stańko, and John Taylor. He also led and co-led several bands in Sweden, and released several recordings.

== Discography ==
=== As leader ===
- Contra Post (Caprice, 1994)
- Opening with Jon Fält (MA, 2009)
- Togetherness with Monica Dominique (Dominique, 2012)
- Trio M/E/D (live) with Peter Erskine, Rita Marcotulli (Abeat, 2015)
- On the Brink of a Lovely Song with Christina von Bülow, Eliot Zigmund (Storyville, 2018)

=== As sideman ===
With Lennart Åberg

- Seven Pieces (2000)
- Green Prints (2002)

With Peter Erskine

- You Never Know (ECM, 1992)
- Time Being (ECM, 1993)
- As It Is (ECM, 1995)
- Juni (ECM, 1997)

With Jan Garbarek

- Witchi-Tai-To (ECM, 1974)
- Dansere (ECM, 1975)

With Keith Jarrett

- Belonging (ECM, 1974)
- My Song (ECM, 1978)
- Personal Mountains (ECM, 1979)
- Nude Ants (ECM, 1979)
- Sleeper (ECM, 2012)

With Lee Konitz

- Alto Summit with Pony Poindexter, Phil Woods and Leo Wright (MPS, 1968)
- Altissimo with Gary Bartz, Jackie McLean and Charlie Mariano (Philips, 1973)

With Karin Krog

- Joy (1968)
- Different Days, Different Ways (1974)

With Christof Lauer

- Christof Lauer (CMP, 1989)
- Bluebells (CMP, 1992)

With Charles Lloyd

- Montreux 82 (Elektra/Musician, 1983)
- A Night in Copenhagen (Blue Note, 1985)
- Fish Out of Water (ECM, 1989)

With Albert Mangelsdorff and Elvin Jones

- The Wide Point (MPS, 1975)

With Ale Möller and Lena Willemark

- The Nordan Suite (ECM, 1994)
- Agram Ale (ECM, 1997)

With Michel Petrucciani

- Live at the Village Vanguard (Blue Note, 1984)
- Pianism (Blue Note, 1985)

With Enrico Rava

- The Pilgrim and the Stars (ECM, 1975)
- The Plot (ECM, 1976)
- L' Opera Va (1993)

With John Taylor

- Angel of the Presence (2005)
- Whirlpool (2008)
- Giulia's Thursdays (2012)

With others

- Jan Allan-70, Jan Allan/Nils Lindberg (1998)
- Some Aspects of Water, Geri Allen (Storyville, 1996)
- Togetherness, Anouar Brahem (Dominique, 2012)
- Al Cohn and Zoot Sims, Al Cohn/Zoot Sims (1982)
- Collaborations, Marilyn Crispell (2009)
- Capricer Med, Eric Ericson/Orphei Draengar (1999)
- Stockholm 1965, Bill Evans (2007)
- Traction Avant, Alessandro Galati (1995)
- Laurita, Richard Galliano (Dreyfus, 1996)
- Music for Two Brothers, Rolf Kühn (1998)
- Watch What Happens!, Steve Kuhn (MPS, 1968)
- Fyra, Magnus Lindgren (2012)
- People Places Times and Faces, Fredrik Lundin (1993)
- Interface, Adam Makowicz (1987)
- The Wide Point, Albert Mangelsdorff (1975)
- Koine, Rita Marcotulli (2003)
- Open, Lina Nyberg (1998)
- For All It Is, Barre Phillips (1971)
- Rena Rama, Rena Rama (1998)
- Inside Pictures-A Tribute to Lars Gullin Vol. 2, Bernt Rosengren (2002)
- Responsorium, Dino Saluzzi (ECM, 2001)
- Litania: Music of Krzysztof Komeda, Tomasz Stańko (ECM, 1997)
- Satu, Edward Vesala (ECM, 1977)
- Spring Mot Ulla-Spring!, Cornelis Vreeswijk (1971)
- Hidden History, Eric Vloeimans (2004)
- Grazing Dreams, Collin Walcott (ECM, 1977)
- Concord, Jens Winther (2005)
- Sanctuary, Barney Wilen (Ida, 1991)
