= Live at the Village Vanguard (Michel Petrucciani album) =

Live album by Michel Petrucciani
- Released: 1985
- Recorded: 16 March 1984
- Venue: Village Vanguard, New York City
- Genre: Jazz
- Label: Concord Jazz

Michel Petrucciani chronology
Note'n Notes (1984)	Live at the Village Vanguard (1985)	Cold Blues (1985)

Live at the Village Vanguard is an album by Michel Petrucciani. The trio recording was made at the New York club in 1984 and released as a double LP.

== Recording and music ==
The album was recorded in concert at the Village Vanguard in New York City on 16 March 1984. Pianist Petrucciani played with bassist Palle Danielsson and drummer Eliot Zigmund. The material is a mix of standards and previously performed Petrucciani compositions.

== Releases and reception ==
Professional ratings
Review scores
Source	Rating
AllMusic	4/5 stars
The Penguin Guide to Jazz	4/4 stars
Philadelphia Inquirer	4/4 stars

The original release was as a double LP by Concord Jazz. Blue Note Records reissued it on CD.

Scott Yanow of AllMusic found, "This double LP finds pianist Michel Petrucciani often showing the influence of Bill Evans. His interplay with bassist Palle Danielsson and drummer Eliot Zigmund (an Evans alumnus) is consistently impressive". The Penguin Guide to Jazz commented that it "captures a typically rumbustious concert set by Petrucciani's trio of the day". Francis Davis of the Philadelphia Inquirer called the album, "a revelation - a far more convincing demonstration of the young French pianist's harmonic acuity, lyrical ardor and rhythmic bite than last year's maundering solo album 100 Hearts."

== Track listing ==
1. "Nardis" (Miles Davis) – 11:12
2. "Oleo" (Sonny Rollins) – 6:44
3. "Le Bricoleur De Big Sur" (Michel Petrucciani) – 3:22
4. "To Erlinda" (Petrucciani) – 11:25
5. "Say It Again And Again" (Petrucciani) – 9:51
6. "Trouble" (O. Dalffon) – 9:31
7. "Three Forgotten Magic Words" (Petrucciani) – 8:56
8. "'Round Midnight" (Monk / Williams / Hanighen) – 8.48

== Personnel ==
- Michel Petrucciani – piano
- Palle Danielsson – bass
- Eliot Zigmund – drums
