= As It Is (album) =

Studio album by Peter Erskine
- Released: 1996
- Recorded: September 1995
- Studio: Rainbow Studio; Oslo, Norway
- Genre: Jazz
- Length: 57:09
- Label: ECM; ECM 1594
- Producer: Manfred Eicher

Peter Erskine chronology
Time Being (1993)	As It Is (1996)	Juni (1997)

As It Is is an album by drummer Peter Erskine, which was recorded in September 1995 and released on ECM the following year. The trio features pianist John Taylor—who wrote most of the album—and bassist Palle Danielsson.

== Reception ==
Professional ratings
Review scores
Source	Rating
AllMusic	3/5 stars
The Penguin Guide to Jazz Recordings	3.5/4 stars

AllMusic critic Scott Yanow said "Although led by a drummer, this trio session mostly showcases English pianist John Taylor who is heavily influenced by Keith Jarrett."

== Track listing ==
All compositions by John Taylor except where noted.

1. "Glebe Ascending" - 7:01
2. "The Lady in the Lake" (Peter Erskine) - 8:00
3. "Episode" - 4:30
4. "Woodcocks" - 7:15
5. "Esperança" (Vince Mendoza) - 3:58
6. "Touch Her Soft Lips and Part" (William Walton) - 4:54
7. "Au Contraire" - 10:18
8. "For Ruth" - 6:44
9. "Romeo & Juliet" (Erskine) - 4:29

== Personnel ==
- Peter Erskine – drums
- John Taylor – piano
- Palle Danielsson – bass
