= Marcus (album) =

Studio album by Marcus Miller
- Released: March 4, 2008
- Genre: Jazz-funk
- Length: 70:48
- Label: Concord
- Producer: Marcus Miller and David Isaac

Marcus Miller chronology
Free (2007)	Marcus (2008)	Thunder (2008)

Professional ratings
Review scores
Source	Rating
Allmusic	4/5 stars
Tom Hull	B

Marcus is an album by jazz bassist Marcus Miller. It was released in 2008.

Marcus is the US version of the previously released album Free. This version not only has additional tracks, but different mixes of the tracks, (Note: Comparing the track lengths of this album and Free courtesy of Allmusic reveals this fact.) a different cover and a modified track order.

== Track listing ==
All songs written by Marcus Miller, except where noted.

1. "Blast!"– 5:43
2. "Funk Joint" – 5:12
3. "Free" (Susaye Greene, Hank Redd, Nathan Watts, Deniece Williams) – 5:00
4. "Higher Ground" (Stevie Wonder) – 5:10
5. "Milky Way" (Miller, Kevin Moore) – 5:36
6. "Pluck (Interlude)" – 3:19
7. "Lost Without U" (Sean E. Hurley, Robin Thicke) – 4:41
8. "'Cause I Want You" (Miller, Shihan van Clief) – 3:12
9. "Ooh" (Miller, Lalah Hathaway) – 4:00
10. "When I Fall In Love" (Edward Heyman, Victor Young) – 5:23
11. "Strum" – 5:41
12. "Jean-Pierre" (Miles Davis) – 6:15
13. "What Is Hip?" (Emilio Castillo, David John Garibaldi, Stephen M. Kupka) – 6:02
14. "Lost Without U (Spoken Word)" (Sean E. Hurley, Robin Thicke) – 5:34

== Personnel ==
- Marcus Miller – multiple instruments
- Corinne Bailey Rae – vocals on "Free"
- Keb' Mo' – vocals on "Milky Way"
- Lalah Hathaway – vocals on "Ooh"
- Shihan the Poet – vocals on "'Cause I Want You"
- Taraji P. Henson – vocals on "Lost Without U (Spoken Word)"
- Gussie Miller – backing vocals
- David Sanborn – alto saxophone
- Tom Scott – tenor saxophone
- Michael "Patches" Stewart – trumpet, flügelhorn
- Paul Jackson, Jr. – guitar
- Bernard Wright – organ, synth
- Gregoire Maret – harmonica
- Poogie Bell – drums
