= Jean-Michel Pilc =

French jazz pianist, composer and educator

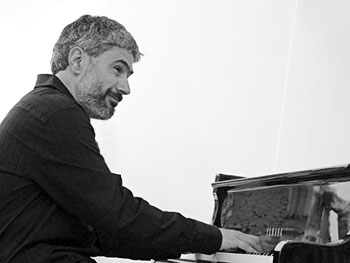

Background information
- Born: October 19, 1960 (age 65); Paris, France
- Genres: Jazz
- Occupation: Musician
- Instrument: Piano
- Labels: Motéma, Dreyfus, Sunnyside, Storyville
- Website: jeanmichelpilc.com

Jean-Michel Pilc (born October 19, 1960, in Paris, France) is a jazz pianist, composer, whistler, and educator currently living in Montreal, Canada.

== Music career ==
A native of Paris, Pilc moved to New York City in 1995. He started a trio with drummer Ari Hoenig and bassist François Moutin that released the album Together: Live at Sweet Basil (A Records, 2000). Pilc has also performed at Birdland, the Blue Note, and Knitting Factory. He signed a multi-record contract with Dreyfus, which released his album Welcome Home with the same trio in 2002.

His next album, Cardinal Points (Dreyfus, 2003) was selected by JazzTimes magazine as one of the top fifty albums of the year. The album included Pilc's long composition "Trio Sonata". which was funded by the Doris Duke Charitable Foundation. Pilc and his trio were recorded live at Iridium Jazz Club in October 2004. The resulting live album was released by Dreyfus in October 2005. He released New Dreams with this trio in 2007, also on the Dreyfus label.

He was music director for Harry Belafonte and has composed music for films. He has worked with John Abercrombie, Richard Bona, Michael Brecker, André Ceccarelli, Roy Haynes, Daniel Humair, Dave Liebman, Michel Portal, Aldo Romano, Martial Solal, and Jean Toussaint.

In 2002 he received the Django Reinhardt Prize from the French Jazz Academy.

== Personal life ==
Pilc has taught at New York University, in New York, USA, and currently teaches at McGill University in Montreal, Canada. He has two children.

== Discography ==
- 1989 Funambule (Blue Line)
- 1993 Big One
- 2000 Together: Live at Sweet Basil (A/Challenge)
- 2001 Together: Live at Sweet Basil, Vol. 2 (Challenge)
- 2001 The Long Journey with Hein van de Geyn (Challenge)
- 2002 Welcome Home (Dreyfus)
- 2003 Cardinal Points (Dreyfus)
- 2004 Follow Me (Dreyfus)
- 2005 Live at Iridium, New York (Dreyfus)
- 2007 New Dreams (Dreyfus)
- 2010 True Story (Dreyfus)
- 2011 Essential (Motéma)
- 2011 Threedom (Motéma)
- 2015 Composing (Storyville)
- 2015 What Is This Thing Called? (Sunnyside)
- 2017 Magic Circle with Sam Newsome (Self-Produced)
- 2018 Parallel (Challenge)
- 2021 Children's Scenes (Justin Time)
- 2021 Visions (Justin Time)
- 2022 Gratitude Suite (Justin Time)
- 2022 Alive: Live at Dièse Onze, Montréal (Justin Time)
