= Dean Brown (guitarist) =

American guitarist (1955–2024)

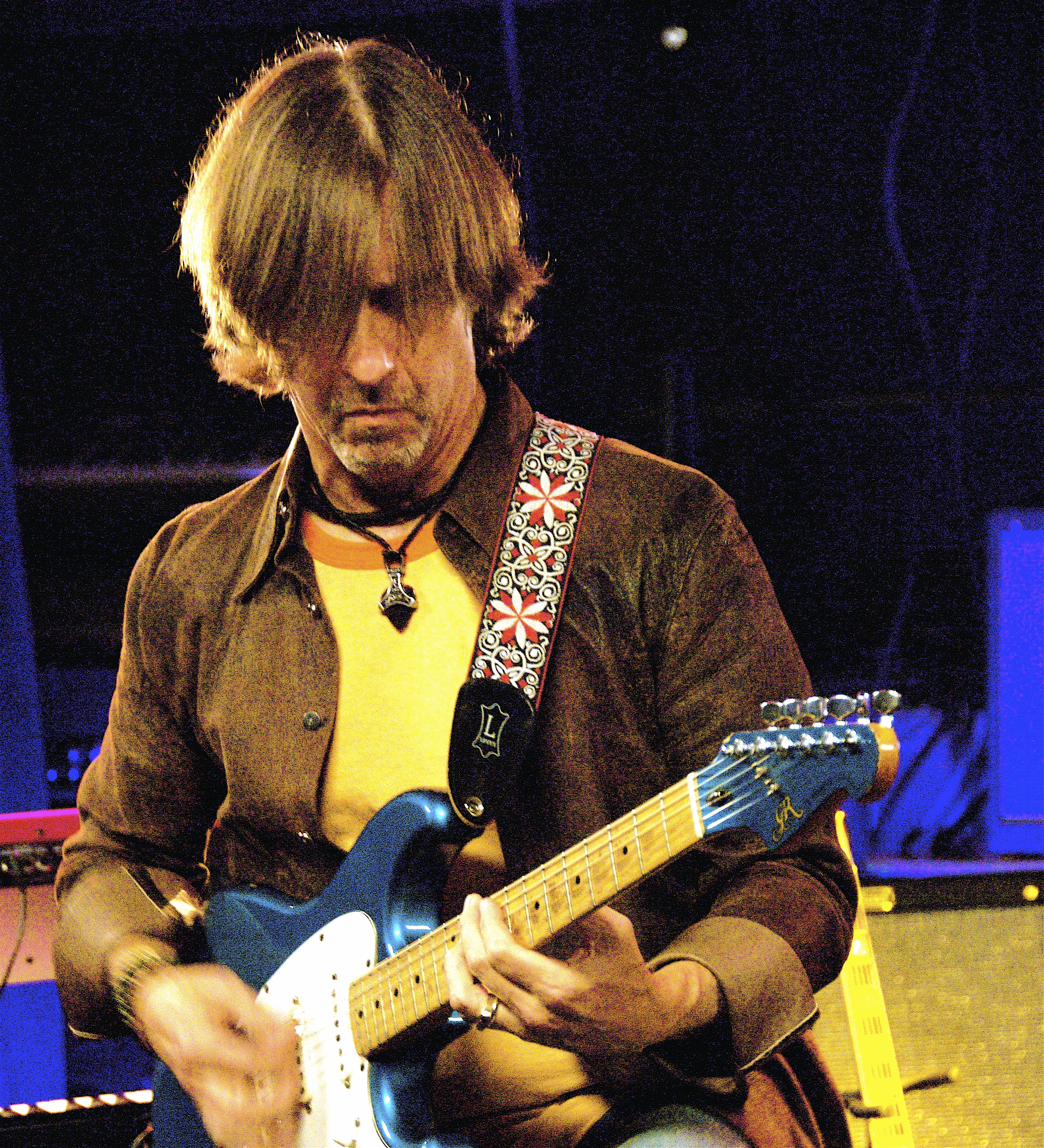

Background information
- Born: August 19, 1955; Châteauroux, France
- Died: January 26, 2024 (aged 68) Los Angeles, California, U.S.
- Genres: Jazz fusion, Jazz, R&B, Rock, Funk
- Occupations: Musician, composer, educator, producer
- Instrument: Guitar
- Years active: 1982–2024
- Labels: ESC, JVC Victor, BHM, Moosicus
- Spouse: Ruth Brown
- Website: www.deanbrown.com

Dean Brown (August 19, 1955 – January 26, 2024) was an American jazz fusion guitarist and session musician.

== Career ==
Dean Brown graduated from Berklee College of Music in 1977. During that time in Boston he performed with his own groups as well as Tiger's Baku, replacing Mike Stern in that group before moving to New York around 1980 and joining Billy Cobham's band.

From 1982 until his death Brown recorded and/or toured worldwide with his own projects as well as with artists Marcus Miller, David Sanborn, Eric Clapton, Kirk Whalum, Billy Cobham, the Brecker Brothers, Roberta Flack, Bob James, Joe Zawinul, George Duke, Victor Bailey, Bill Evans, and Steve Smith's Vital Information.

As a solo artist, Brown produced five solo CDs with his fifth solo CD "Rolajafufu" just being released in Spring 2016. His first titled "Here" (2001) on ESC Records, is his all-star debut CD featuring jazz greats Michael Brecker, Marcus Miller, David Sanborn, Billy Cobham, George Duke, Randy Brecker, Christian McBride, Don Alias, Bill Evans, Bernard Wright and many others. His second record "Groove Warrior" (2004) on ESC Records, features another all-star lineup with Lalah Hathaway, Marcus Miller, Bernard Wright, JuJu House, Poogie Bell, Schuyler Deale, Booker King, and Patches Stewart, just to name a few. His third "DBIII" (2009) on the BHM label features an all-star power trio with musical greats Dennis Chambers and Will Lee. His fourth CD "Unfinished Business"(2012) featuring yet another all-star cast of musicians with Marvin "Smitty" Smith, Kirk Whalum, Dennis Chambers, Jimmy Earl, Gerry Etkins, and Hadrien Feraud among others.

Brown's studio guitar work can be heard on over 100 albums, including four Grammy Award winners. Records such as the Brecker Brothers' Return of the Brecker Brothers and Out of the Loop, Marcus Miller's The Sun Don't Lie, Billy Cobham's Warning, and Joe Zawinul's Faces and Places are just a few out of the long list. His live performances include DVDs with Marcus Miller, Billy Cobham, Gil Evans, David Sanborn, Louie Bellson, Bob James, and Steve Smith's Vital Information. Brown's compositions and arrangements are featured on albums by Les McCann, Dennis Chambers, Ricky Peterson, Steve Smith's Vital Information, and Billy Cobham.

As an educator and clinician Dean conducted master classes at schools and venues at home and abroad and taught several classes of his own curriculum at Musicians Institute in Hollywood, California. Dean also released an instructional/live DVD with publishing giant Hal Leonard for Musicians Institute titled "Modern Techniques for the Electric Guitarist"(2008) and has had several featured instructional articles in Guitar Player Magazine (US), Guitar World (US), Gitarre and Bass (G), Bass Player, Jazz Life (Jp), Big Box (I), Muzikus (Cz), Guitarist (Fr) and 20th Century Guitar magazines (US).

Brown died from an aggressive form of cancer on January 26, 2024, at the age of 68.

== Discography ==
=== As leader ===
- Here (ESC, 2000)
- Groove Warrior (ESC, 2004)
- DBIII Live at the Cotton Club Tokyo (BHM, 2009)
- Unfinished Business (Moosicus, 2012)
- Rolajafufu (Dean Brown Music, 2016)

=== As sideman ===
With Brecker Brothers

- Return of the Brecker Brothers (GRP, 1992)
- Out of the Loop (GRP, 1994)

With Till Brönner

- Midnight (Button, 1996)
- Chattin With Chet (Verve, 2000)

With Dennis Chambers

- Outbreak (ESC, 2002)
- Planet Earth (BHM, 2005)

With Billy Cobham

- Observations & (Elektra Musician, 1982)
- Smokin (Elektra Musician, 1983)
- Warning (GRP, 1985)
- Powerplay (GRP, 1986)
- By Design (Fnac Music 1992)
- Palindrome (BHM, 2010)
- Spectrum 40 Live (Creative Multimedia Concepts, 2015)

With Bill Evans (saxophonist)

- Touch (ESC, 1999)
- Soul Insider (ESC, 2000)

With Bob James

- Ivory Coast (Tappan Zee/Warner Bros., 1988)
- Grand Piano Canyon (Warner Bros., 1990)
- Restless (Warner Bros., 1994)

With Jason Miles

- World Tour (Lipstick, 1994)
- Miles to Miles (Narada, 2005)

With Marcus Miller

- The Sun Don't Lie (Dreyfus Jazz, 1993)
- Tales (Dreyfus Jazz, 1995)
- The Ozell Tapes (3 Deuces, 2002)
- Master of All Trades (Dreyfus Jazz, 2005)[DVD-Video]
- Silver Rain (Koch, 2005)

With David Sanborn

- Hearsay (Elektra, 1994)
- Songs from the Night Before (Elektra, 1996)
- Inside (Elektra, 1999)

With Steve Smith

- Vital Information (Columbia, 1983)
- Orion (Columbia, 1984)

With Kirk Whalum

- And You Know That! (Columbia, 1988)
- The Promise (CBS, 1989)
- Cache (Columbia, 1993)

With Lenny White

- Present Tense (Hip Bop, 1995)
- Renderors of Spirit (Hip Bop, 1996)

With others

- Victor Bailey, That's Right (ESC, 2001)
- Randy Brecker, The Brecker Brothers Band Reunion (Piloo, 2013)
- Color Me Badd, Time and Chance (Giant, 1993)
- Tom Coster, from the Street (JVC, 1996)
- DJ Logic & Jason Miles, Global Noize (Shanachie, 2008)
- Roberta Flack, Let It Be Roberta (429 Records, 2012)
- Eddie Harris, The Last Concert (ACT, 1997)
- Al Jarreau, Miki Howard, Marcus Miller, David Sanborn, Everybody Is a Star Live in Tokyo (Jazz Hour, 2010)
- Eric Marienthal, Sweet Talk (Peak, 2003)
- Les McCann, Pump It Up (ESC, 2002)
- Bernard Purdie, Bernard Purdie's Soul to Jazz (ACT, 1996)
- Steps Ahead, Yin-Yang (NYC, 1992)
- Vital Information, Global Beat (Columbia, 1986)
- Joe Zawinul, Faces & Places (Cream/Jms 2002)

== Video ==
- 1987: Steve Smith, Part I and II
- 2001: David Sanborn, David Sanborn and Friends
- 2002: Gil Evans, Gil Evans and His Orchestra
- 2003: Louie Bellson, Louie Bellson and His Big Band
- 2006: Marcus Miller Master of All Trades
- 2007: Billy Cobham/Louie Bellson, Cobham Meets Bellson
- 2008: Dean Brown, Modern Techniques for the Electric Guitarist
