= Sweet Soul (Peter Erskine album) =

Studio album by Peter Erskine
- Released: 1992
- Recorded: March 1991
- Genre: Jazz
- Label: Novus

Peter Erskine chronology
| Auroa (1989) | Sweet Soul (1992) | You Never Know (1993) |

Sweet Soul is an album by the American drummer Peter Erskine, released in 1992. It was a top ten hit on Radio & Records's Jazz Albums chart.

== Production ==
The album was recorded in March 1991. Erskine was backed by John Scofield on guitar, Joe Lovano and Bob Mintzer on saxophones, Randy Brecker on trumpet, Marc Johnson on bass, and Kenny Werner on piano. "In Your Own Sweet Way" is a version of the Dave Brubeck composition. "Touch Her Soft Lips and Part" was written by William Walton.

== Critical reception ==
Professional ratings
Review scores
| Source | Rating |
|---|---|
| All Music Guide to Jazz | 4/5 stars |
| Boston Herald | B+ |
| The Cincinnati Post | 3/5 stars |
| The Encyclopedia of Popular Music | 2/5 stars |
| MusicHound Jazz: The Essential Album Guide | 3.5/5 stars |
| The Penguin Guide to Jazz Recordings | 3.5/4 stars |
| The Philadelphia Inquirer | 2.5/4 stars |
| The Rolling Stone Jazz & Blues Album Guide | 4/5 stars |

The Boston Herald noted that "the grooves grow heavier when guitarist [Scofield] shows up, but stay well clear of fusion cliches and pomposity." The Ottawa Citizen called Erskine "a crisp and interesting player [who] keeps a low profile in high-powered company." The Globe and Mail concluded that "Sweet Soul is more tasteful than inventive... These musicians have worked together before in various combinations and know each other's moves well. Erskine asks only that they do again what they have always done well."

The Edmonton Journal stated that "the material ... avoids flash and promotes substantial solos, especially on the trio and quartet numbers." The Philadelphia Inquirer labeled Erskine a "drummer colorist". The Courier-Journal called the album "a pleasant musical journey, not a display of chops." The Morning Call considered it "a lush, masterful record".

== Track listing ==
| No. | Title | Length |
|---|---|---|
| 1. | "Touch Her Soft Lips and Part" |
| 2. | "Press Enter" |
| 3. | "Sweet Soul" |
| 4. | "To Be or Not to Be" |
| 5. | "Ambivalence" |
| 6. | "Angels and Devils" |
| 7. | "Speak Low" |
| 8. | "Scolastic" |
| 9. | "Distant Blossom" |
| 10. | "But Is It Art?" |
| 11. | "In Your Own Sweet Way" |
