= Biréli Lagrène =

French born jazz guitarist (born 1966)

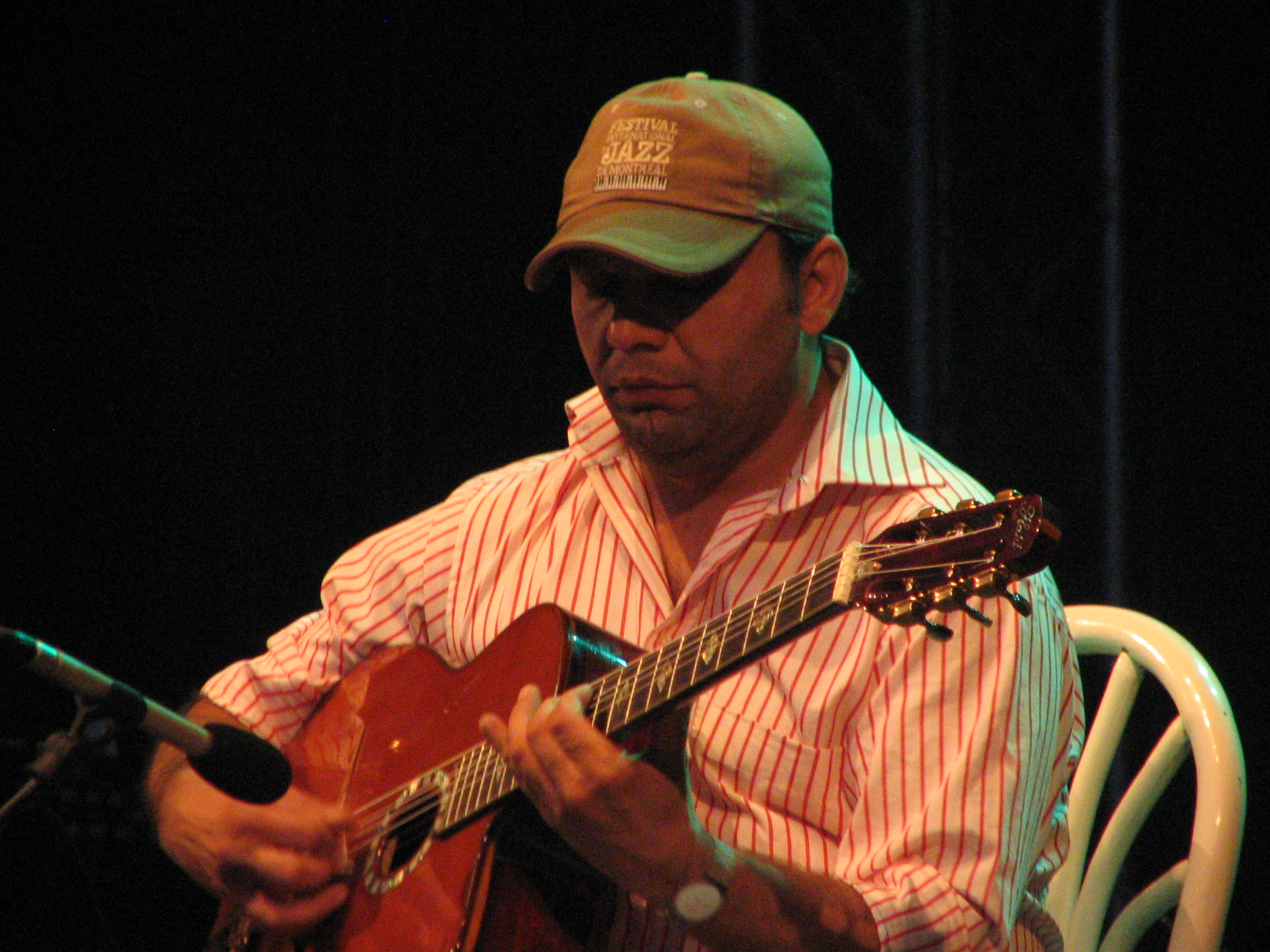
- Lagrène performing at the Festival des Granges à Laimont, August 2006

Background information
- Born: 4 September 1966 (age 59); Soufflenheim, France
- Genres: Gypsy jazz, swing, jazz fusion
- Occupation: Musician
- Instrument: Guitar
- Years active: 1978–present
- Labels: BMG Rights Management, Blue Note, Dreyfus
- Website: www.birelilagrene.com

Biréli Lagrène (born 4 September 1966) is a French jazz guitarist who came to prominence in the 1980s for his Django Reinhardt–influenced style. He often performs in swing, jazz fusion, and post-bop styles.

== Biography ==
Lagrène was born in Soufflenheim, Alsace, France, into a Romani family and community. His father and grandfather were guitarists, and he was raised in the Gypsy guitar tradition. He started playing at age four or five and by seven was improvising jazz in a style similar to that of Django Reinhardt, whom his father admired and wanted his sons to emulate. In 1980, while in his early teens, he recorded his first album, Routes to Django: Live at the Krokodil (Jazzpoint, 1981).

During the next few years, Lagrène toured with Al Di Meola, Paco de Lucía, and John McLaughlin, all of them guitarists, and played with Benny Carter, Benny Goodman, and Stéphane Grappelli. He joined Larry Coryell and Vic Juris in New York City for a tribute to Reinhardt in 1984 and went on tour with Coryell and Philip Catherine. He also performed with Jaco Pastorius, Stanley Clarke, the Gil Evans Orchestra, Christian Escoudé, and Charlie Haden. In 1989 he performed in a duo with Stanley Jordan.

His collaboration with Italian guitarist Giuseppe Continenza, with whom he has performed in numerous concerts and festivals, including the Pescara Jazz and the Eddie Lang Jazz Festival, began in 1998, when the two met behind the scenes of a festival and started talking about each other's musical interests.

== Awards ==
- "Django d’Or" for "French Musician" (1993)
- "Les Victoires de la Musique" in the category of "Jazz Album" for the album Front Page (2001)
- "Les Victoires de la Musique" nominated in the category of "Jazz Album" for the album Gypsy Project and Friends (2003)
- "Django d’Or" for "French Musician" (2002)
- "Django d’Or" for "People's Choice" (2002)
- "Django d’Or" for "Balkan/Gypsy" guitar (2007)
- Medal of "Chevalier des Arts & des Lettres" of France as awarded by Frédéric Mitterrand, Minister of Culture and Communication (2012)

== Discography ==
- Routes to Django (Antilles, 1980)
- Swing '81 (Jazzpoint Records, 1981)
- 15 (Antilles, 1982)
- Down in Town (Antilles, 1983)
- Django's Music Vol. 1 with Mike Peters, Bob Wilber (Stash, 1985)
- Stuttgart Aria with Jaco Pastorius and Vladislav Sendecki (Jazzpoint, 1986)
- Bireli Lagrene and Special Guests with Larry Coryell, Miroslav Vitous (Jazzpoint, 1986)
- Inferno (Blue Note, 1987)
- Foreign Affairs (Blue Note, 1988)
- Acoustic Moments (Blue Note, 1990)
- Standards (Blue Note, 1992)
- Live at the Carnegie Hall (Jazz Point, 1993) – live
- Live in Marciac (Dreyfus, 1994) – live
- My Favorite Django (Dreyfus, 1995)
- Blue Eyes (Dreyfus, 1998)
- Duet with Sylvain Luc (Dreyfus, 1999)
- Front Page with Dominique di Piazza and Dennis Chambers (Universal Music France, 2000)
- Gipsy Project (Dreyfus, 2001)
- Gipsy Project & Friends (Dreyfus, 2002)
- Biréli Lagrène Gipsy Project, Move (Dreyfus, 2004)
- Dreyfus Night in Paris with Marcus Miller, Michel Petrucciani, Lenny White, Kenny Garrett (Dreyfus, 2003) – live rec. 1994
- Djangology (A Tribute to Django Reinhardt) with WDR Big Band (Dreyfus, 2006) – rec. 2005
- To Bi or Not to Bi (Dreyfus, 2006) – live rec. 2005–2006
- Electric Side (Dreyfus, 2008)
- Gipsy Trio (Dreyfus, 2009) – rec. 2008
- Mouvements (Universal, 2012)
- D-Stringz with Stanley Clarke, Jean-Luc Ponty (Impulse!, 2015)
- Storyteller (Naive, 2018)
- Solo Suites (PeeWee!, 2022)
- Bireli Lagrene Plays Loulou Gasté (BMG Rights Management, 2023)
- Elegant People (PeeWee!, 2026) – rec. 2025

== Filmography ==
- 1989 Super Guitar Trio - Live at Montreux
- 2004 Bireli Lagrene & Friends:Live Jazz a Vienne (Dreyfus)
- 2005 Django: A Jazz Tribute
- 2005 Bireli Lagrene & Gypsy Project Live in Paris
- 2006 Live in Paris (Dreyfus)
- 2009 Monaco Dreyfus Night (Dreyfus)
- 2017 Biréli Lagrène: Voilà!
