= Ari Hoenig =

American jazz drummer (born 1973)

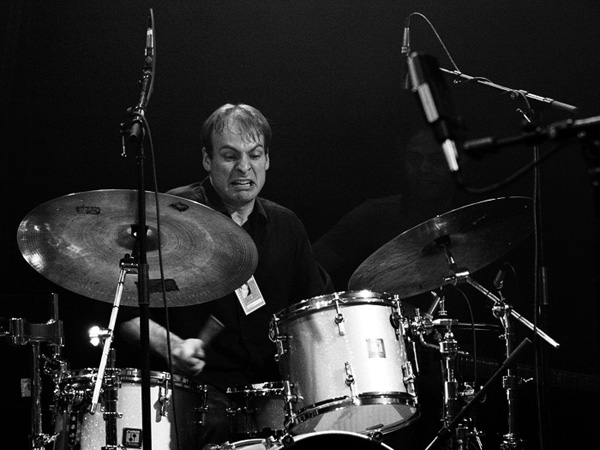
- Ari Hoenig at Moers Festival, June 2006, Germany

Background information
- Born: November 13, 1973 (age 52); Philadelphia, Pennsylvania, U.S.
- Genre: Jazz
- Occupations: Musician, composer
- Instrument: Drums
- Years active: 2000–present
- Labels: Smalls, Dreyfus, Chesky, Motéma, Lyte
- Website: www.arihoenig.com

Ari Hoenig (born November 13, 1973) is an American jazz drummer, composer, and educator.

== Educational materials ==
Hoenig has taught and is on the faculty at New York University and The New School in New York. He gives clinics and lectures at music schools and universities worldwide.

With bassist Johannes Weidenmueller, he released Intro to Polyrhythms Vol 1, and Metric Modulations, Expanding and Contracting Time within Form Vol 2. (Mel Bay 2009, 2012) In 2011, he released Systems Book 1, Drumming Technique and Melodic Jazz Independence (Alfred Publishing) and the DVD Melodic Drumming (2011). In 2014, Ari released the video Rhythm Training about time and rhythmic vocabulary. In 2017, he released two videos: Mastering Odd Times and Drums: Jazz Coordination.

== Awards ==
In 2013 Hoenig won the BMW Welt (World) award in Munich, an international competition for best band led by a drummer.

== Discography ==
=== As leader ===
- Time Travels (1999)
- The Life of a Day (Ah Ha, 2002)
- The Painter (Smalls, 2004)
- Inversations (Dreyfus, 2006)
- Bert's Playground (Dreyfus, 2008)
- Punkbop: Live at Smalls (Smallslive, 2010)
- Lines of Oppression (Naïve, 2012)
- The Pauper and the Magician (Ah Ha, 2016)
- NY Standard (Fresh Sound, 2018)
- Conner's Days (Fresh Sound, 2019)
- Live (Nath, 2021)
- Golden Treasures (Fresh Sound, 2022)
- Tea for three (Fresh Sounds, 2024)

=== Collaboration ===
With Sam Yahel, Mike Moreno and Seamus Blake

- Jazz Side of the Moon (Chesky, 2008) – rec. 2007

=== As sideman ===
With Richard Bona

- Scenes from My Life (Columbia, 1999)
- Reverence (Columbia, 2001)
- Tiki (EmArcy, 2005)

With Jean-Michel Pilc

- Together Live at Sweet Basil (A Records, 2000)
- Welcome Home (Dreyfus, 2002)
- Cardinal Points (Dreyfus, 2003)
- New Dreams (Dreyfus, 2007)
- Threedom (Motema, 2011)

With Kenny Werner

- Beauty Secrets (RCA Victor, 1999)
- Form and Fantasy (Double-Time, 2001)
- Beat Degeneration Live Vol. 2 (Night Bird Music, 2002)
- Peace: Live at the Blue Note (Half Note, 2004)
- With a Song in My Heart (Venus, 2008)
- The Melody (Pirouet, 2015)
- Animal Crackers (Pirouet, 2017)

With J. D. Walter

- 2Bass, a Face and a Little Skin (Dreambox, 2004)
- Clear Day (Double-Time, 2001)

With others

- Quentin Angus, In Stride (QFTF, 2017)
- Diego Barber, 411 (Origin, 2013)
- Bojan Z, Xenophonia (Label Bleu, 2006)
- Bill Carrothers, Keep Your Sunny Side Up (Pirouet, 2007)
- Orlando le Fleming, Orlando le Fleming & Romantic Funk (OLF, 2017)
- Macy Gray, Stripped (Chesky, 2016)
- Tigran Hamasyan, World Passion (Plus Loin Music, 2009)
- Gilad Hekselman, Splitlife (Smalls, 2006)
- Antoine Herve, Road Movie (Nocturne, 2006)
- James Hurt, Dark Grooves, Mystical Rhythms (Blue Note, 1999)
- Jazz Mandolin Project, Xenoblast (Blue Note, 2000)
- Julien Lourau, The Rise (Label Bleu, 2001)
- Shahin Novrasli, Bayati (Bee Jazz, 2013)
- Jamie Oehlers, Smoke and Mirrors (Jazzheads, 2012)
- Josh Roseman, Cherry (Enja, 2000)
- Jacques Schwarz-Bart, Immersion (Fresh Sound, 1999)
- Jazzheads, Avant Wot Not (1K Recordings, 1999)
