= Pianism =

Studio album by Michel Petrucciani
- Released: 1986
- Recorded: 20 December 1985
- Genre: Jazz
- Label: Blue Note
- Producer: Mike Berniker

Michel Petrucciani chronology
Cold Blues (1985)	Pianism (1986)	Power of Three (1987)

Professional ratings
Review scores
Source	Rating
The Penguin Guide to Jazz Recordings	3/4 stars

Pianism is a jazz album by Michel Petrucciani.

The album was recorded at RCA Studio "C", and was produced by Mike Berniker, engineer Mike Moran. The Blue Note catalogue number is CDP 7 46295 2.

This was Petrucciani's first album recorded under contract for Blue Note, the previous recordings having originally been released by Concord and others (though some were subsequently reissued by Blue Note).

== Track listing ==
1. "The Prayer" (Michel Petrucciani) – 11:05
2. "Our Tune" (Michel Petrucciani)– 6:51
3. "Face's Face" (Michel Petrucciani) – 4:37
4. "Night And Day" (Cole Porter) – 9:20
5. "Here's That Rainy Day" (Van Heusen / Burke) - 9:51
6. "Regina" (Michel Petrucciani) - 9:20

== Personnel ==
Musicians

- Michel Petrucciani - Piano
- Palle Danielsson - Bass
- Eliot Zigmund - Drums

Production

- Mike Berniker – producer
- Mike Moran – engineer (recording)
- Mary Ann Topper, The Jazz Tree – management
- John Berg – design
- David Michael Kennedy – photography
