= Solo Live (Michel Petrucciani album) =

Live album by Michel Petrucciani
- Released: 1998
- Recorded: 27 February 1997
- Venue: Alte Oper, Frankfurt, Germany
- Genre: Jazz
- Length: 152:35
- Label: Dreyfus

Michel Petrucciani chronology
Both Worlds (1997)	Solo Live (1998)	Trio in Tokyo (1999)

Michel Petrucciani chronology
Dreyfus Night in Paris (2003)	Piano Solo: The Complete Concert in Germany (2007)	Michel Petrucciani & NHØP (Live) (2009)

Piano Solo: The Complete Concert in Germany cover

Professional ratings
Review scores
Source	Rating
AllMusic	4.5/5 stars
The Penguin Guide to Jazz	4.0/4 stars

Solo Live is a solo piano album by Michel Petrucciani, recorded in 1997 at the Alte Oper in Frankfurt, Germany, and released on the Dreyfus label in 1998. A double-CD version of the concert was released in 2007, under the title Piano Solo: The Complete Concert in Germany, and featured 20 tracks instead of the original release's 11.

== Music ==
Most of the tracks are Petrucciani originals. "Looking Up" is "overtly optimistic and inherently hopeful"; "Home" is a "statement of warmth and comfort"; "Brazilian Like" is "orchestral and melodic to the point at which the tune remains in one's head long after its conclusion".

== Reception ==
The AllMusic review awarded it four and a half stars and described it as "Petrucciani's lasting solo gift to the jazz world". The Penguin Guide to Jazz gave it a maximum four stars and added it to the suggested Core Collection list.

== Track listing ==
All tracks written by Petrucciani, unless stated otherwise.

=== 1998 CD release ===
1. "Looking Up" – 4:24
2. "Besame Mucho" (Consuelo Velázquez) – 4:03
3. "Rachid" – 2:22
4. "Chloé Meets Gershwin" – 4:08
5. "Home" – 3:40
6. "Brazilian Like" – 3:07
7. "Little Peace in C for U" – 4:12
8. "Romantic But Not Blue" – 3:22
9. "Trilogy in Blois (Morning Sun, Noon Sun and Night Sun in Blois)" – 11:29
10. "Caravan" (Irving Mills, Duke Ellington, Juan Tizol) – 10:09
11. "She Did It Again" / "Take The A Train" (Billy Strayhorn) / "She Did It Again" – 4:53

=== 2007 2CD Complete release ===
1. "Colors" – 7:43
2. "Training" – 3:12
3. "Hidden Joy" – 2:46
4. "Les Grelots" (Eddie Louiss) – 4:26
5. "Guadeloupe" – 5:02
6. "Love Letter" – 5:44
7. "Little Peace in C for U" – 4:47
8. Michel Petrucciani Speech – 2:55
9. "J'Aurais Tellement Voulu" – 3:30
10. "Rachid" – 2:22
11. "Chloé Meets Gershwin" – 4:07
12. "Home" – 3:29
13. "Brazilian Like" – 3:13
14. "Romantic But Not Blue" – 3:28
15. "Trilogy in Blois (Morning Sun in Blois - Noon Sun in Blois - Night Sun in Blois)" – 11:48
16. "Caravan" (Ellington, Tizol, Mills) – 10:46
17. "Looking Up" – 3:51
18. "Besame Mucho" (Velázquez) – 4:51
19. "She Did It Again" – 2:08
20. "Take the "A" Train" (Strayhorn) – 2:27
