= Tales (album) =

Studio album by Marcus Miller
- Released: May 23, 1995
- Genre: Jazz fusion
- Length: 63:08
- Label: PRA; Dreyfus
- Producer: Marcus Miller

Marcus Miller chronology
The Sun Don't Lie (1993)	Tales (1995)	Live & More (1997)

Tales is the fourth studio album by American jazz musician Marcus Miller. The album was released in May 23, 1995 on PRA/Dreyfus Records. He supported it with a North American tour.

The album peaked at No. 7 on the US Billboard Top Contemporary Jazz Albums chart and No. 12 on the US Billboard Top Jazz Albums chart. Tales was also Grammy nominated, in the category of "Best Contemporary Jazz Performance".

== Production ==
The album was produced by Miller. It samples the voices of several Black American musicians. "Eric" is dedicated to the guitarist Eric Gale. Miller wrote or cowrote nine of the album's songs; the title track was written with Allen Toussaint.

== Critical reception ==
Professional ratings
Review scores
Source	Rating
AllMusic	4/5 stars
The Encyclopedia of Popular Music	2/5 stars
The Penguin Guide to Jazz on CD	2.5/4 stars

The Independent wrote that the album "lashes its constituent parts together with stupendous playing and rigorous adherence to the principle that music is about spinning yarns, not showing off." Adam Sweeting of The Guardian determined that most of Miller's music "occupies a safe centre ground of funk basslines, loose-limbed drumming from Poogie Bell, and layers of beatific keyboard harmonies."

Joe Rassenfoss of The Rocky Mountain News opined that Meshell Ndegeocello "spellbinds with 'Rush Over', a ballad wrought from spoken word and singing." Marty Hughley of The Oregonian praised Miller's "knack for welding groove to harmonic structure and balancing upscale polish with urban grit." Steve Miller of The Atlanta Journal-Constitution deemed Miller "a fusionaire whose slickness is cued to the marketplace, but he also knows how to round up a band."

Scott Yanow of AllMusic, in a 3/5 star review wrote, "Marcus Miller's electric bass is a major force throughout the music...A few songs (especially later in the program) ramble on a bit and one wishes that Marcus Miller would drop the funk now and then for variety's sake, but in general his set holds one's interest."

== Track listing ==
All tracks composed by Marcus Miller except where noted.

1. "The Blues" – 5:45
2. "Tales (Intro)" (Miller, Allen Toussaint) – 0:30
3. "Tales" (Miller, Allen Toussaint) – 5:46
4. "Eric" – 6:16
5. "True Geminis" – 5:35
6. "Rush Over" – 5:00
7. "Running Through My Dreams (Interlude)" – 1:27
8. "Ethiopia" – 5:15
9. "Strange Fruit (Intro)" (Abel Meeropol) – 1:20
10. "Strange Fruit" (Abel Meeropol) – 2:14
11. "Visions" (Stevie Wonder) – 5:36
12. "Tales (Reprise)" – 2:34
13. "Forevermore (Intro)" – 0:31
14. "Forevermore" – 4:58
15. "Infatuation" – 5:08
16. "Come Together" (John Lennon, Paul McCartney) – 5:30

European, Japanese and other US Releases

1. "The Blues" - 5:45
2. "Tales" - 5:46
3. "Eric" - 6:16
4. "True Geminis" - 5:35
5. "Rush Over" - 5:18
6. "Running Through My Dreams (Interlude)" - 1:27
7. "Ethiopia" - 5:15
8. "Strange Fruit" - 3:19
9. "Visions" - 4:48
10. "Brazilian Rhyme" (Maurice White) - 5:01
11. "Forevermore" - 5:07
12. "Infatuation" - 5:08
13. "Tales (Reprise)" - 2:34
14. "Come Together" - 5:30

== Personnel ==
- Marcus Miller – Wurlitzer electric piano (1, 4), bass guitar (1, 3–8, 11, 14–16), rhythm programming (1, 3–5, 7–8, 11, 14–16), vocal samples (1, 15–16), synthesizers (3–4, 8, 10, 16), sound programming (3–7, 10–11, 14–15), organ (4), rhythm guitar (4), keyboards (5–7, 11, 14–15), guitars (5, 16), bass clarinet (5–6, 8, 10), African flute (7), voice recording (14)
- Bernard Wright – organ (1, 4), synthesizers (1), clavinet (3), synth lines (8), marimbas (8), electric piano (15), synth bass (16)
- David Ward – sound programming (1, 3–4, 7, 10, 11, 14–16)
- Poogie Bell – drums (1, 3–4, 6, 11, 14, 16), drum fills (8)
- Kenny Garrett – alto saxophone (1, 3–5, 8, 11, 15)
- Michael "Patches" Stewart – trumpet (1, 3, 5, 8, 11, 14)
- The Pointer Sisters – vocal samples (3, 13)
- Bill Cosby – vocal samples (1)
- Q-Tip – spoken intro (2)
- Lenny White – drum fills (4)
- Hiram Bullock – lead guitar solo (4)
- Eric Gale – voice recording (4)
- Joshua Redman – tenor sax solo (5)
- Miles Davis – voice recording (5)
- Jason Miles – additional sound programming (5)
- Meshell Ndegeocello – synth solo (6), vocals (6)
- Bashiri Johnson – percussion samples (8)
- Bill Withers – spoken intro (9)
- Joe Sample – rap (12)
- Roberta Flack – spoken intro (13)
- Lalah Hathaway – vocals (15)
- Jonathan "Juice" Miller – funky intro (16)
- Dean Brown – guitars (16)
- Julian "Juju" Miller – funky intro (16)

Musicians on "Brazilian Rhyme"

- Marcus Miller – keyboards, bass guitar, sound programming
- Bernard Wright – synthesizers, synth bass
- David Ward – sound programming
- Poogie Bell – drums
- Kenny Garrett – alto saxophone
- Michael "Patches" Stewart – trumpet
- Lalah Hathaway – vocals

Production

- Marcus Miller – producer, additional recording
- David Ward II – co-producer, recording
- Goh Hotoda – mixing (1, 3, 6, 10, 12, 15–16), additional recording, mixing on "Brazilian Rhyme"
- Ray Bardani – mixing (4–5, 7–8, 11, 14), additional recording
- Roland Alvarez – additional recording
- Bruce Miller – additional recording
- Jonathan Miller – additional recording
- Eric Flickinger – assistant engineer
- Jim Labinski – assistant engineer
- Jay Militscher – assistant engineer
- Bernie Grundman – mastering at Bernie Grundman Mastering (Hollywood, California)
- Bibi Green – production coordinator
- Norman Moore – art designer
- William Claxton – front cover photography, insert photography
- Hideo Oida – back cover photography, additional photography
- Patrick Rains & Associates – management
