= Franck Avitabile =

French jazz pianist

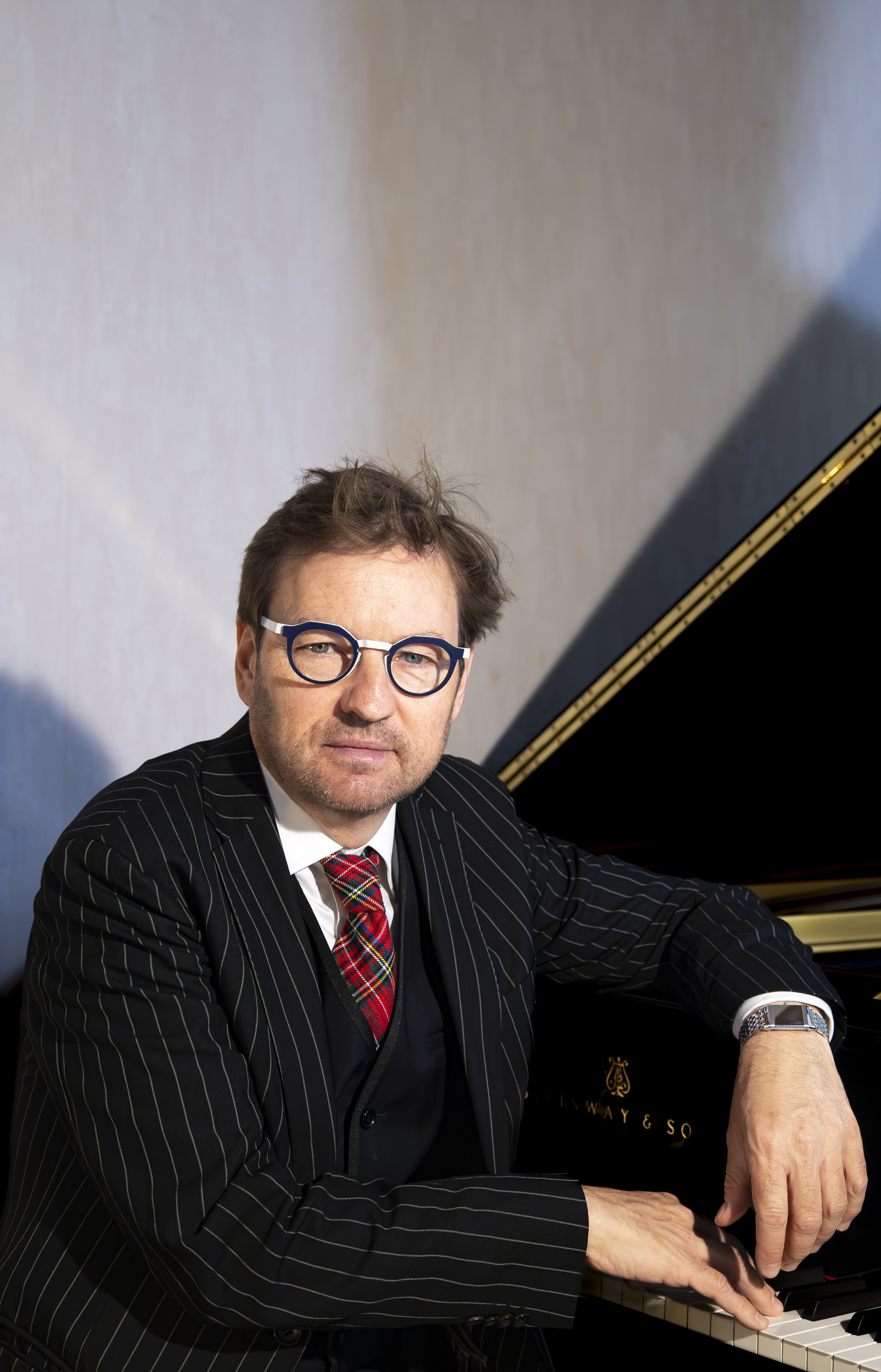

Background information
- Born: 24 November 1971 (age 54); Lyon, France
- Genres: Jazz
- Occupation: Musician
- Instrument: Piano
- Years active: 1996–present
- Label: Disques Dreyfus
- Website: www.franckavitabile.com

Franck Avitabile (born 24 November 1971) is a jazz pianist.

Avitabile has synesthesia. He is also the composer of 60 published compositions.

== Awards and honors ==
- Second Grand Prize - Concours International de la Ville de Paris - Martial Solal Piano Jazz International Competition 1998
- DjangodOr - Best First Record Album, France 1999
- Victoires de la Musique - Revelation of the year 2004
- CHOC Jazzman magazine for the album Just Play, 2006
- CHOC Jazzman magazine for the album Short Stories, 2006
- FIP Radio CD of the month for the album Paris Sketches, 2009

== Selected discography ==
| Year recorded | Title | Label | Personnel/Notes |
|---|---|---|---|
| 1997 | Lumieres | Dreyfus | Trio, with Louis Petrucciani (bass), Thomas Grimmonprez (drums) |
| 2000 | Right Time | Dreyfus | Trio, with Niels-Henning Ørsted Pedersen (bass), Roberto Gatto (drums) |
| 1998 | In Tradition | Dreyfus | Trio, with Riccardo Del Fra (bass), Luigi Bonafede (drums) |
| 2002 | Body & Soul | Video Arts | |
| 2002 | Bemsha Swing | Dreyfus | Trio, with Rémi Vignolo (bass), Dré Pallemærts (drums) |
| 2005 | Just Play | Dreyfus | Solo piano |
| 2006 | Short Stories | Dreyfus | Solo piano |
| 2008 | Paris Sketches | Dreyfus | Trio, with Pino Palladino (electric bass), Manu Katché (drums) |

== Discography ==
- Franck Avitabile - Paris Sketches (2009)
- Michel Petrucciani The Montreux Years (2023) - as an executive producer
- Michel Petrucciani Solo in Denmark (2022) - as a coproducer
- Franck Filosa - Jazz Session for Drums vol. 2 (2019)
- Another Romantic Vol 3, José Fallot (2018)
- Simply Piano Moods (Compilation, 2017)
- Michel Petrucciani Both Worlds Live (2016) - as a record producer
- Another Romantic Vol 2, José Fallot (2015)
- Arabesque - Steinway & Sons (Compilation, 2013)
- Ritz Paris - Jazz Around The Ritz (Compilation, 2012)
- Franck Avitabile - On Air - DVD (2009)
- Monte Carlo Dreyfus Night - DVD (2009)
- Franck Avitabile - Short Stories (2006)
- Documentaire réalisé par Pascal Roul pour Zycopolis - Mezzo (2006)
- Dreyfus Jazz 20 ans 20 CD (Coffret, 2011)
- TSF Jazz 1999|2009 10 ANS (Coffret, 2009)
- Dreyfus Jazz Club : Piano Solo (Compilation, 2011)
- Les Légendes du Jazz (Compilation, 2009)
- Dreyfus Jazz Club : Drummers (Compilation, 2011)
- Dreyfus Jazz Club : Piano Trio (Compilation, 2011)
- Dreyfus Jazz Club : In The Mood Of ... Monk (Compilation, 2011)
- Jazz Spirit (Compilation, 2010)
- West Side Story, Ludovic de Preissac Septet (2010)
- Essential Jazz (Compilation, 2008)
- Classique & Jazz (Compilation, 2008)
- 15 Years of Dreyfus Jazz (Compilation, 2007)
- La nouvelle vague du piano (Compilation, 2009)
- Food for Thought, Tassel Naturel (2007)
- Diamond Suite, DJ REG (2006)
- Les Inrockuptibles (Compilation, automne 2006)
- Franck Avitabile - Just Play (2005)
- Apopsis Seven, JP Gallis (2005)
- Opus 2, Fillet of Soul (2005)
- Duc des Lombards, Jazz Club (2004)
- A child Is Born (Compilation, 2004)
- Bande Originale du Film Une femme de ménage (2004)
- Franck Avitabile - Bemsha Swing (2002)
- DJ Cam presents Fillet of Soul (2002)
- Documentaire 88 touches de plaisir réalisé par Patrick Savey pour Zycopolis - Mezzo (2001)
- Franck Avitabile - Right Time (2000)
- Talent Midem (2000)
- To Be or Not to Bop, Christian Ton Ton Salut (2000)
- Paris Jazz Quintet (2000)
- Collector Dreyfus Jazz (1999)
- Franck Avitabile - In Tradition (1998)
- Franck Avitabile - Lumieres (1997)
- Franck Avitabile - Tribute to Bud Powell (1996)
