= The Manhattan Project (album) =

Studio album by The Manhattan Project
- Released: 1990
- Recorded: December 16, 1989
- Genre: Jazz fusion
- Length: 1:00:54
- Label: Blue Note
- Producer: Lenny White

Professional ratings
Review scores
Source	Rating
AllMusic	4/5 stars

The Manhattan Project is a jazz fusion album, the only recording to be made by a band of the same name comprising Wayne Shorter, Michel Petrucciani, Gil Goldstein, Pete Levin, Stanley Clarke and Lenny White. The album was released in 1990 by Blue Note Records.

== Background ==
The arrangements were written by Lenny White and Gil Goldstein, and the album was recorded live before an audience at Chelsea Studios, New York, with Alec Head engineering. Executive producers were Michael Cuscuna and Stephen Reed.

The project was the brainchild of White, who proposed transforming traditional jazz standards based on saxophone/piano arrangements with multiple synthesizers. The musicians invited for the project ranged from jazz traditionalist Petrucciani to longtime fusion experimenter Clarke. The project was also just one of many collaborations between White and Clarke. The musicians experimented with blues and funk arrangements of the standard jazz songs, and used both electric and acoustic instruments.

The 1989 album has since been augmented by a DVD featuring a performance filmed the same year and released in 2005. The performance included a seven-song set by Shorter, Petrucciani, Clarke, and White and featured Rachelle Ferrell on one track.

== Track listing ==
1. "Old Wine, New Bottles" (Lenny White) – 6:54
2. "Dania" (Jaco Pastorius) – 7:38
3. "Michel's Waltz" (Michel Petrucciani) – 4:40
4. "Stella by Starlight" (Ned Washington, Victor Young) – 8:45
5. "Goodbye Pork Pie Hat" (Charles Mingus) – 9:28
6. "Virgo Rising" (Wayne Shorter) – 5:41
7. "Nefertiti" (Wayne Shorter) – 8:54
8. "Summertime" (George Gershwin, Ira Gershwin, DuBose Heyward) – 8:54

== Personnel ==
- Wayne Shorter – tenor and soprano saxophone
- Michel Petrucciani – piano
- Gil Goldstein – keyboards
- Pete Levin – keyboards
- Stanley Clarke – acoustic and electric bass
- Lenny White – drums
- Rachelle Ferrell – vocals
