= Power of Three (Michel Petrucciani album) =

Studio album by Michel Petrucciani
- Released: 1987
- Recorded: 14 July 1986
- Genre: Jazz
- Length: 45:54 LP Version; 58:43 CD version
- Label: Blue Note
- Producer: David Rubinson; Mary Ann Topper

Michel Petrucciani chronology
Pianism (1986)	Power of Three (1987)	Michel plays Petrucciani (1988)

Professional ratings
Review scores
Source	Rating
AllMusic	4.5/5 stars
The Penguin Guide to Jazz Recordings	3.5/4 stars

Power of Three is a jazz album by Michel Petrucciani, recorded live at the Montreux Jazz Festival in 1986. It features Petrucciani playing several duets with guitarist Jim Hall, as well as three performances with Wayne Shorter joining the pair.

== Track listing ==
=== LP release ===
Side A

1. "Limbo" (Wayne Shorter) - 7:57
2. "Careful" (Jim Hall) - 6:49
3. "Morning Blues" (Michel Petrucciani) - 8:15

Side B

1. "In a Sentimental Mood" (Duke Ellington) - 12:18
2. "Bimini" (Jim Hall) - 10:05

=== CD release ===
1. "Limbo" (Wayne Shorter) - 7:57
2. "Careful" (Jim Hall) - 6:49
3. "Morning Blues" (Michel Petrucciani) - 8:15
4. "Waltz New" (Jim Hall) - 5:30
5. "Beautiful Love" (King, Young, Alstyne, Gillespie) - 7:19
6. "In A Sentimental Mood" (Duke Ellington) - 12:18
7. "Bimini" (Jim Hall) - 10:05

== Personnel ==
- Michel Petrucciani - piano
- Jim Hall - guitar
- Wayne Shorter - tenor saxophone (tracks 1 & 7), soprano saxophone (track 3)
