= M² (album) =

M^{2}

Studio album by Marcus Miller
- Released: May 8, 2001
- Studio: Hannibal Studios (Santa Monica, California); Camel Recording Studio, Milky Way Technics, Garage Sale Recording and Universal Music Studios (Los Angeles, California); Larrabee Sound Studios (North Hollywood, California); Sound On Sound (New York City, New York); Groid Studios (New Rochelle, New York); Strawberry Skies (West Columbia, South Carolina); AR Studios (Rio de Janeiro, Brazil)
- Genre: Jazz fusion
- Length: 65:22
- Label: Telarc Records
- Producer: Marcus Miller; David Isaac

Marcus Miller chronology
Live & More (1997)	M^{2} (2001)	The Ozell Tapes (2002)

Professional ratings
Review scores
Source	Rating
Allmusic	4/5 stars
Atlanta Journal Constitution	(B)

M^{2} is a studio album by Jazz fusion musician Marcus Miller, released in 2001 on Telarc Records. This album won the 2002 Grammy Award for Best Contemporary Jazz Album.

== Critical reception ==
Sonia Murray of the Atlanta Journal Constitution, in a B review declared, "on occasion, the past bandmate of Miles Davis, Steely Dan's Donald Fagen, George Benson and others steps out front and graces us with a solo project. And his first such effort in seven years -- even in its funk tendencies -- evokes the kind of ease and beauty that makes the word "grace" appropriate."

Rob Theakston of Allmusic in a 4/5 star review commented, "Marcus Miller continues to display his multi-instrument virtuosity with M², and while the order of the day is still smooth jazz, there's more of a soulful R&B edge than the majority of his previous work. It also features an all-star cast that includes Herbie Hancock, Branford Marsalis, Raphael Saadiq, Paul Jackson, Jr., and Lenny White among others."

== Track listing ==
All tracks composed by Marcus Miller except where noted.

1. "Power" – 4:37
2. "Lonnie's Lament" (John Coltrane) – 5:39
3. "Boomerang" – 5:49
4. "Nikki's Groove" – 3:28
5. "Goodbye Pork Pie Hat" (Charles Mingus) – 3:34
6. "Ozell (Interlude 1)" – 0:48
7. "Burning Down the House" (David Byrne, Jerry Harrison, Chris Frantz, Tina Weymouth) – 6:54
8. "It's Me Again" – 6:05
9. "Cousin John" – 4:42
10. "Ozell (Interlude 2)" – 0:39
11. "3 Deuces" – 5:51
12. "Red Baron" (Billy Cobham) – 6:38
13. "Ozell (Interlude 3)" – 1:01
14. "Your Amazing Grace" – 7:43
15. "Boomerang Reprise" – 1:54

== Personnel ==
- Marcus Miller – Wurlitzer electric piano (1), synthesizers (1–8, 10–15), vocoder (1, 4), bass guitars (1, 8, 12, 14), drum programming (1–6, 10, 13, 14), scratches (1, 6, 10, 12–13), organ (2, 11), guitars (2, 11), bass guitar (2–4, 7, 9, 11, 15), tenor saxophone (2, 6, 10, 12–14), bass clarinet (2, 5, 7, 9, 10, 13–15), lead vocals (3), acoustic bass (3), vocals (4), Fender Rhodes (4, 7–9, 12), synth bass (4, 15), alto saxophone (4), fretless basses (5), B♭ clarinet (5, 9), fretless bass (6, 10, 13), rhythm guitar (7), Roland TR-808 (7), backing vocals (8), clavinet (9), ambient synthesizer (9), talking synth bass (9), electric guitar (10, 13), radio (11), guitar effects (12), percussion programming (12, 14, 15), vibraphone (12), acoustic guitar (13), soprano saxophone (14)
- Bernard Wright – Fender Rhodes (1, 7), organ (4)
- Herbie Hancock – acoustic piano (3), acoustic piano solo (5)
- Paul Jackson, Jr. – acoustic guitar (3, 8), guitars (4), dobro (9)
- Hiram Bullock – lead guitar (7), guitars (12, 15)
- Leroy Taylor – synth bass (2, 7, 12), Fender Rhodes (15)
- Poogie Bell – drums (7, 9, 11–12, 15)
- David Isaac – water effects (1), hi-string note (1), tom overdubs (7), cowbell (7), triangle (7), percussion programming (11)
- Mino Cinelu – percussion (6, 8–10, 13)
- Kenny Garrett – alto saxophone (2, 12), alto sax solo (7, 15)
- Branford Marsalis – soprano sax solo (2, 8)
- Hubert Laws – flute solo (2), flute (9)
- Wayne Shorter – soprano saxophone (9), soprano sax solo (13)
- Fred Wesley – trombone (7), trombone solo (12)
- Michael "Patches" Stewart – trumpet (2–3, 7)
- Larry Corbett – cello (1–3, 7, 9, 13–14)
- Matt Funes – viola (1, 3, 7, 9, 12, 14)
- Joel Derouin – violin (1, 3, 12, 14)
- Lenny White – brush fills (2)
- Raphael Saadiq – lead vocals (3)
- Nikki Miller – vocals (4)
- Vinnie Colaiuta – drums (8)
- Djavan – scat vocals (8)
- James Carter – tenor sax solo (11)
- Maceo Parker – alto sax solo (12)
- Chaka Khan – vocals (14)

== Production ==
- Harold Goode – executive producer
- Harry Martin – executive producer
- Marcus Miller – executive producer, producer, recording
- David Isaac – co-producer, recording, mixing (3, 11, 14, 15)
- Khaliq-O-Vision – recording, mixing (3, 11, 14), vocal recording (15), assistant engineer
- Ray Bardani – mixing (1, 2, 4–10, 12, 13)
- Paul Mitchell – recording
- Malcolm Pollack – recording
- Enrico DePaoli – vocal recording (8)
- David Hampton – piano recording (3, 5)
- Danny Romero – vocal recording (3)
- Michelle Forbes – assistant engineer
- Richard Furch – assistant engineer
- Takamasa Honda – assistant engineer
- Alexandre Reis – assistant engineer
- Charles Harrison – string copyist, string transcription
- Bibi Green – production coordination
- Jack Frisch – art direction, design
- Kumiko Higo – photography
- Jack Leitenberg – management
- David Passick – management
