= Time Being (Peter Erskine album) =

Studio album by Peter Erskine
- Released: 1994
- Recorded: November 1993
- Studio: Rainbow Studio; Oslo, Norway
- Genre: Jazz
- Length: 63:54
- Label: ECM; ECM 1532
- Producer: Manfred Eicher

Peter Erskine chronology
You Never Know (1992)	Time Being (1994)	As It Is (1995)

Time Being is an album by American jazz drummer Peter Erskine recorded in November 1993 and released on ECM the following year. The trio features pianist John Taylor and bassist Palle Danielsson.

== Reception ==
Professional ratings
Review scores
Source	Rating
AllMusic	3/5 stars
The Penguin Guide to Jazz Recordings	3.5/4 stars

The AllMusic review by Scott Yanow awarded the album 3 stars stating "This CD is actually most interesting for the playing of Taylor who contributes three of the originals and plays in a style not that far from Keith Jarrett. In general the music starts out pretty quiet but builds its intensity and holds one's interest."

== Track listing ==
All compositions by Peter Erskine except as indicated

1. "Terraces" (Palle Danielsson, Peter Erskine, John Taylor) - 7:08
2. "For the Time Being" - 5:13
3. "If Only I Had Known" - 6:05
4. "Evansong" (John Taylor) - 8:06
5. "Page 172" (Taylor) - 6:02
6. "Liten visa till Karin" (Staffan Linton) - 4:57
7. "Bulgaria" - 4:48
8. "Ambleside" (Taylor) - 6:36
9. "Phrase One" (Kenny Wheeler) - 5:19
10. "Palle's Headache" (Danielsson) - 5:26
11. "Pieds-en-l'air" (Peter Warlock) - 4:36

== Personnel ==
- Peter Erskine – drums
- John Taylor – piano
- Palle Danielsson – bass
