= You Never Know (album) =

Studio album by Peter Erskine
- Released: January 1993
- Recorded: July 1992
- Studio: Rainbow Studio; Oslo, Norway
- Genre: Jazz
- Length: 58:08
- Label: ECM; ECM 1497
- Producer: Manfred Eicher

Peter Erskine chronology
Sweet Soul (1992)	You Never Know (1993)	Time Being (1994)

You Never Know is an album by American jazz drummer Peter Erskine, recorded in July 1992 and released on ECM Records in January 1993. The trio features pianist John Taylor and bassist Palle Danielsson.

== Reception ==
The AllMusic review by Lee Bloom stated, "The material on this date falls comfortably within the realm of what the ECM label is famous for; meticulously recorded, lyrical chamber music."

DownBeat gave the album 4½ stars, praising Erskine's "more zen than macho" subtlety, stating "rather than keeping strict time, Peter plays a more melodic function here, commenting on the music while Danielsson holds the center."

Professional ratings
Review scores
Source	Rating
AllMusic	2.5/5 stars
DownBeat	4.5/5 stars
The Penguin Guide to Jazz Recordings	3/4 stars

== Track listing ==
All compositions by John Taylor except as indicated

1. "New Old Age" – 9:30
2. "Clapperclowe" – 4:55
3. "On the Lake" (Peter Erskine) – 5:07
4. "Amber Waves" (Vince Mendoza) – 5:45
5. "She Never Has a Window" (Mendoza) – 7:20
6. "Evans Above" – 6:19
7. "Pure and Simple" – 6:38
8. "Heart Game" (Mendoza) – 5:16
9. "Ev'rything I Love" (Cole Porter) – 7:45

== Personnel ==
- Peter Erskine – drums
- John Taylor – piano
- Palle Danielsson – bass
