= Thomas Dutronc =

French singer

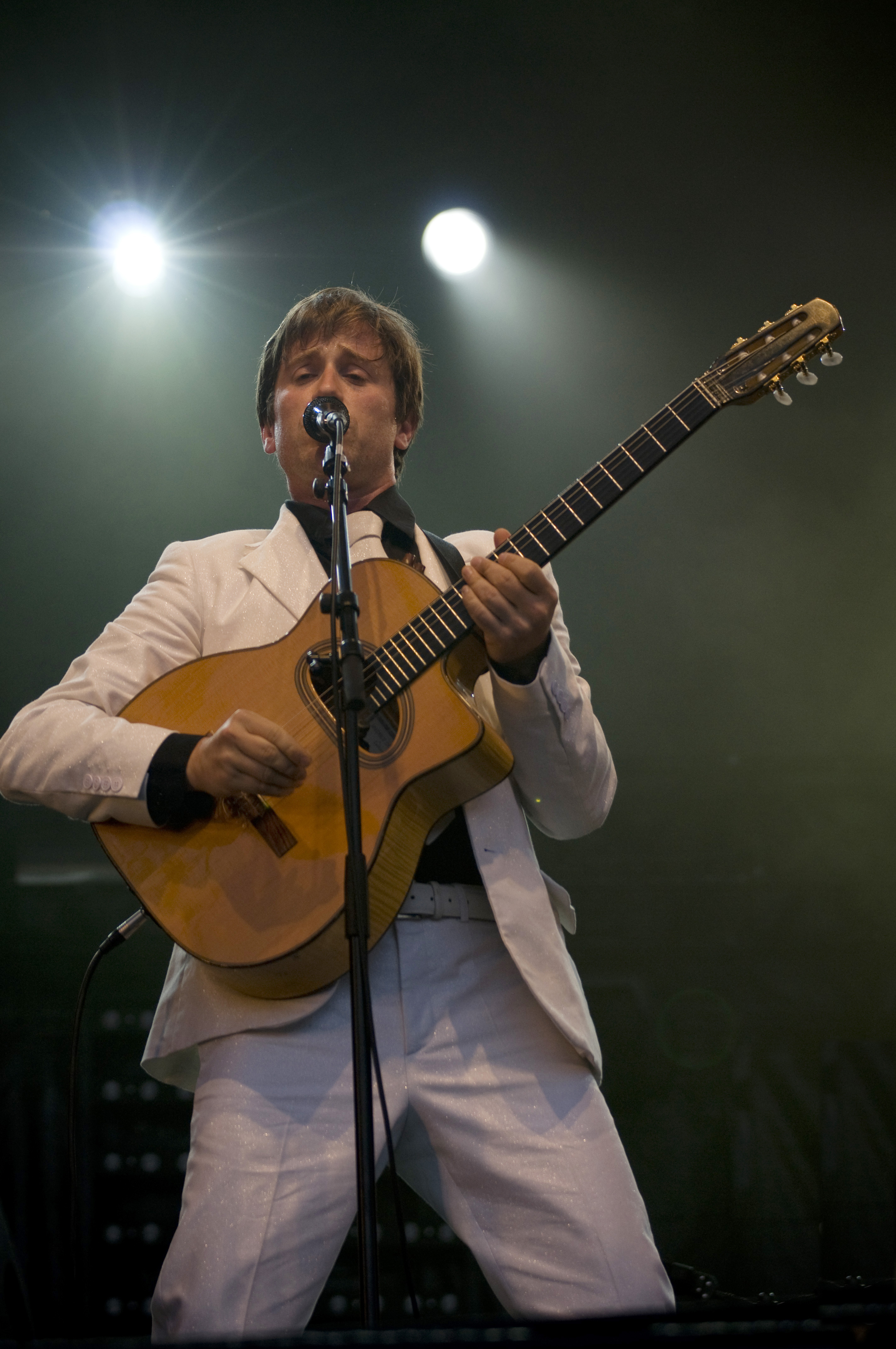
- Dutronc in 2008
- Born: Thomas Dutronc; 16 June 1973 (age 53); Paris, France
- Occupations: Singer; guitarist
- Family: Jacques Dutronc (father); Françoise Hardy (mother)

Thomas Dutronc (French pronunciation: [tɔma dytʁɔ̃]; born 16 June 1973) is a French singer and jazz manouche guitarist. He was born in Paris, the son of singer, songwriter and guitarist Françoise Hardy and singer, songwriter, guitarist, and film actor Jacques Dutronc.

== Career ==
On 13 February 2008, he received the UNAC award for his song "J'aime plus Paris". It also became the most played French single around the world during 2008.

On 8 March 2008, he was nominated at the 23rd Victoires de la Musique in two categories, as new artist of the year and album of the year.

In 2020, he released the album Frenchy, which features guest performances by artists such as Iggy Pop, Dianna Krall, Billy Gibbons, and Rocky Gresset.

== Philanthropy ==
Thomas Dutronc has been a member of the charity ensemble Les Enfoirés since 2009.

== Awards ==
- 2008: Globes de Cristal Award – Best Male Singer for "Comme un manouche sans guitare"
- 2009: Victoires de la Musique (France) – Original Song of the Year for "Comme un manouche sans guitare"

== Discography ==
=== Albums ===
Year	Title	Charts				Certifications
Year	Title	FRA	BEL (WA)	BEL (FL)	SWI	Certifications
2007	Comme un manouche sans guitare	5	7	—	61	SNEP: 2× Diamond
2009	Comme un manouche sans guitare – le live	69	46	—	—	
2011	Silence on tourne, on tourne en rond	2	2	75	21	
2011	Jazz Manouche by Thomas Dutronc	184	—	—	—	
2015	Éternels jusqu'à demain	4	5	115	24	SNEP: Gold
2018	Live Is Love	—	21	—	62	
2020	Frenchy	2	2	—	7	SNEP: Platinum
2022	Dutronc & Dutronc (with Jacques Dutronc as Dutronc & Dutronc)	7	10	—	—	SNEP: Gold
2023	La tournée générale!	41	33	—	—	
2024	Il n'est jamais trop tard	—	19	—	33	

=== Singles ===
Year	Title	Peak chart positions				
Year	Title	FRA	BEL (WA) Ultratop	BEL (WA) Ultratip*	BEL (FL) Ultratip*	SWI
2009	"Comme un manouche sans guitare"	30	—	8	—	—
2011	"Demain!"	50	21	—	82	—
2013	"Le blues du rose"	94	—	—	—	—
2013	"Tout le monde veut devenir un cat"	107	—	—	—	—

*Did not appear in the official Belgian Ultratop 50 charts, but rather in the bubbling under Ultratip charts.
