= Michel plays Petrucciani =

Michel Plays Petrucciani

Studio album by Michel Petrucciani
- Released: 1988
- Recorded: 24 September and 9–10 December 1987
- Genre: Jazz
- Label: Blue Note
- Producer: Eric Kressman / Michel Petrucciani

Michel Petrucciani chronology
Power of Three (Michel Petrucciani album) (1987)	Michel Plays Petrucciani (1988)	Music (1989)

Professional ratings
Review scores
Source	Rating
The Penguin Guide to Jazz Recordings	3/4 stars

Michel Plays Petrucciani is a jazz album by Michel Petrucciani, Blue Note catalogue number CDP 7 48679 2. It consists entirely of Petrucciani's own compositions.

The album was recorded during two sets of sessions, with tracks 1–5 recorded on 24 September 1987 with bassist Gary Peacock and drummer Roy Haynes, and the remaining tracks over 9 & 10 December of the same year with bassist Eddie Gómez and drummer Al Foster.

== Personnel ==
- Michel Petrucciani – piano
- Gary Peacock – acoustic bass (1–5)
- Roy Haynes – drums (1–5)
- Eddie Gómez – acoustic bass (6–9)
- Al Foster – drums (6–9)

with:

- John Abercrombie – electric guitar (2 & 7)
- Steve Thornton – percussions (9)

== Track listing ==
All tracks composed by Michel Petrucciani

1. "She Did It Again" – 4:03
2. "One For Us" – 5:09
3. "Sahara" – 4:14
4. "13th" – 4:05
5. "Mr. K.J." – 4:19
6. "One Night at Ken And Jessica's" – 3:08
7. "It's A Dance" – 6:16
8. "La Champagne" – 6:14
9. "Brazilian Suite" – 6:24
