= The Ozell Tapes =

Live album by Marcus Miller
- Released: September 28, 2002
- Recorded: April – August 2002
- Genre: Jazz
- Length: 2:24:44
- Label: 3 Deuces Records; JVC
- Producer: Marcus Miller, Dennis Thompson

Marcus Miller chronology
M² (2001)	The Ozell Tapes (2002)	Dreyfus Night in Paris (2003)

The Ozell Tapes is a live album by Marcus Miller. The first edition of the album was sold on tour dates on Marcus' own label.

== Track listing ==
All tracks composed by Marcus Miller except where noted.

=== Disc 1 ===
1. "Intro" (Big Doug Epting) - 1:07
2. "Power" - 6:00
3. "So What" (Miles Davis) - 8:54
4. "Lonnie's Lament" (John Coltrane) - 10:52
5. "Cousin John" - 10:42
6. "Scoop" - 12:28
7. "I Loves You Porgy" (George Gershwin, Ira Gershwin, DuBose Heyward) - 9: 28
8. "Panther" - 11:22

=== Disc 2 ===
1. "3 Deuces" - 6:23
2. "Your Amazing Grace" - 10:43
3. "Nikki's Groove" - 5:10
4. "When Your Life Was Low" (Joe Sample, Will Jennings). 8:08
5. "Burning Down the House" (David Byrne, Jerry Harrison, Chris Frantz, Tina Weymouth) - 6:34
6. "People Make The World Go 'Round" (Thom Bell, Linda Creed) - 11:08
7. "Killing Me Softly" (Charles Fox, Norman Gimbel) - 6:44
8. "Miles/Marcus Medley: Hannibal/Amandla/Tutu" (Amandla Poets) - 19:11

== Personnel ==
=== Musicians ===
- Marcus Miller – keyboards, bass guitars, bass clarinet, soprano saxophone
- Dean Brown – guitars
- Poogie Bell – drums
- Roger Byam – flute, soprano saxophone, tenor saxophone
- Michael "Patches" Stewart – trumpet
- Bruce Flowers – keyboards (2–5, 7–9)
- Leroy Taylor – keyboards (6, 10–16)
- Lalah Hathaway – vocals (14–15)

=== Production ===
- Harold Goode – executive producer
- Harry Martin – executive producer
- Marcus Miller – executive producer, producer
- Dennis Thompson – co-producer, recording, mixing
- David Isaac – mastering at Hannibal Studios (Santa Monica, California)
- Taka Honda – studio assistant
- Bibi Green – production coordinator, artist management, photography
- Jack Frisch – art direction, design, photography
- R. Andrew Lepley – cover photography

The Crew

- Rebekah Foster – production and tour manager, monitor engineer
- Curtis Baker – stage manager
- Dennis Thompson – house engineer
- Doug Epstein – bass, guitar and horn technician
- Gary Williams – bass, guitar and horn technician
- Clyde Hunt – drum technician
- Ewan MacPherson – drum technician
- Paul Southernwood – drum technician
