= Juni (album) =

Studio album by Peter Erskine
- Released: April 1999
- Recorded: July 1997
- Studio: Rainbow Studio; Oslo, Norway
- Genre: Jazz
- Length: 50:40
- Label: ECM; ECM 1657
- Producer: Manfred Eicher

Peter Erskine chronology
| Lava Jazz (1997) | Juni (1999) | Live at Rocco (2000) |

Juni is an album by drummer Peter Erskine recorded in July 1997 and released on ECM April later that year. The trio features bassist Palle Danielsson and pianist John Taylor.

== Reception ==
Professional ratings
Review scores
| Source | Rating |
|---|---|
| AllMusic | 3.5/5 stars |
| The Penguin Guide to Jazz Recordings | 3.5/4 stars |

The AllMusic review by Jim Newsom awarded the album 3½ stars stating "A beautiful collection full of subtlety and nuance... soft, spatial, melodic, and accessible."

== Track listing ==
All compositions by John Taylor, except as noted.

1. "Prelude No. 2" - 5:37
2. "Windfall" - 6:17
3. "For Jan" (Kenny Wheeler) - 6:45
4. "The Ant & the Elk" (Peter Erskine) - 7:08
5. "Siri" (Erskine) - 6:33
6. "Fable" - 5:32
7. "Twelve" (Erskine) - 7:20
8. "Namasti" (Diane Taylor) - 5:28

== Personnel ==
- Peter Erskine – drums
- John Taylor – piano
- Palle Danielsson – bass
