= 100 Hearts =

Studio album by Michel Petrucciani
- Released: 1984
- Recorded: June 1983
- Studio: RCA Studio A, New York City
- Genre: Jazz
- Label: The George Wein Collection
- Producer: Gabreal Franklin

Michel Petrucciani chronology
Oracle's Destiny (1983)	100 Hearts (1984)	Note'n Notes (1984)

100 Hearts is a solo piano album by Michel Petrucciani. It was recorded in 1983 and released by the George Wein Collection before being reissued by Blue Note Records.

== Recording and music ==
The solo piano album was recorded in RCA Studio A, New York City, in June 1983. It was produced by Gabreal Franklin. The material consists of compositions by Ornette Coleman, Charlie Haden, Sonny Rollins, two Petrucciani originals, and a medley of "Someday My Prince Will Come", "All the Things You Are", "A Child Is Born", and "Very Early".

== Releases and reception ==
Professional ratings
Review scores
Source	Rating
AllMusic	4.5/5 stars
The Penguin Guide to Jazz	4/4 stars

100 Hearts was released by George Wein Collection. It was reissued by Blue Note Records. The AllMusic reviewer concluded that it was "A very impressive outing." The Penguin Guide to Jazz commented that the album "established Petrucciani as one of the great romantic virtuosos in the jazz of his time".

== Track listing ==
1. "Turn Around" (Ornette Coleman)
2. "Three Forgotten Magic Words" (Petrucciani)
3. "Silence" (Charlie Haden)
4. "St. Thomas" (Sonny Rollins)
5. "Pot Pourri (Medley): Someday My Prince Will Come/All the Things You Are/A Child Is Born/Very Early" (Larry Morey, Frank Churchill / Oscar Hammerstein, Jerome Kern / Thad Jones, Alec Wilder / Bill Evans)
6. "100 Hearts" (Petrucciani)

== Personnel ==
- Michel Petrucciani – piano
