= Poogie Bell =

American drummer (born 1961)

- Born: Charles Bell Jr. February 11, 1961 (age 65); Pittsburgh, Pennsylvania, U.S.
- Origin: New York, United States
- Genres: Jazz, jazz fusion, rhythm and blues, rock, funk
- Occupation: Musician
- Instrument: Drums
- Years active: 1964–present
- Website: poogiebell.net

Charles Bell Jr. (born February 11, 1961, Pittsburgh, Pennsylvania), better known by his stage name Poogie Bell, is an American jazz drummer, composer, band leader and producer. Bell is best known as a drummer, working extensively with bassist Marcus Miller and as a sideman for other artists such as Erykah Badu, Victor Bailey, David Bowie, Alex Bugnon, Stanley Clarke, Randy Crawford, Roberta Flack, Al Jarreau, Chaka Khan, Angelique Kidjo, Joe Sample, David Sanborn, John Scofield, Stanley Turrentine, Luther Vandross, Vanessa Williams, and Victor Wooten.

== Life and career ==
=== Early life ===
Bell was born in 1961 in Pittsburgh, Pennsylvania to Charles Bell, Sr. and Alice Pittrell. His father was a jazz pianist and band leader for the Charles Bell Contemporary Jazz Quartet. As an infant, Bell regularly watched his father's band rehearse. He made his concert debut with his father's band at age two and a half, playing at Carnegie Music Hall, Pittsburgh, and in 1966, he performed with Pearl Bailey on the Mike Douglas Show.

Bell moved to New York with his family, where his father took up a music professorship. In New York, Bell continued to be immersed in the world of music. His father regularly rehearsed at home with Ron Carter, Richard Davis, Ornette Coleman, Max Roach, and Mary Lou Williams, and the bassist Paul Chambers was a neighbor. While growing up in New York, Bell was friends with Omar Hakim, Weldon Irvine, Marcus Miller, Lenny White, and Bernard Wright, all of whom went on to professional music careers of their own.

=== Professional career ===
Bell has an extensive discography as a sideman, producer and arranger. He produced Alex Bugnon, smooth jazz artist Mey, pop and R&B artist Kenji Hino, jazz bassist owner of Yuji Sound Records and promotion company Poogie Bell Presents, LLC.

=== Grammy Awards ===
Bell performed on Chaka Khan's 1992 album The Woman I Am, which won the 1993 Grammy Award for Best Female R&B Vocal Performance and on Marcus Miller's album M2, which won the 2001 Best Contemporary Jazz Album. He also performed on Angélique Kidjo's 2007 release Djin Djin, which won the Grammy Award for Best Contemporary World Music Album in 2008.

== Videos ==
- Poogie Bell Interview

== Discography ==
- 2004: Poogie Bell Band – Thinking Outside The Box
- 2007: Poogie Bell Band – Get on the Kit
- 2009: Poogie Bell Band – Poogie on Shuffle
- 2010: Poogie Bell Band – My America
- 2013: Poogie Bell Band – Suga Top

=== As a sideman ===
- 1979: Weldon Irvine – The Sisters
- 1980: Weldon Irvine – Weldon & The Kats
- 1981: Bobby Broom – Clean Sweep
- 1991: Marcus Miller – Out of the World
- 1992: Chaka Khan – The Woman I Am
- 1992: Najee – Just An Illusion
- 1993: Kirk Whalum – Caché
- 1993: Marcus Miller – The Sun Don't Lie
- 1995: Marcus Miller – Tales
- 1996: Various Artists – World Christmas
- 1997: Marcus Miller – Live & More
- 1997: Erykah Badu - "Erykah Badu: Live"
- 1998: Marcus Miller – The Best of Marcus Miller
- 1999: Various Artists – An American Love Story
- 2001: Marcus Miller – M² (2002 Grammy Award for Best Contemporary Jazz Album)
- 2002: Marcus Miller – The Ozell Tapes – Live 2001
- 2003: Michael 'Patches' Stewart – Blow
- 2004: Dean Brown – Groove Warrior
- 2005: Marcus Miller – Master of All Trades
- 2005: Marcus Miller – Silver Rain
- 2007: Angelique Kidgo - Djin Djin (nominated for Grammy Award for Best Contemporary World Music Album)
- 2008: Marcus Miller – Marcus
- 2008: S.M.V. – Thunder
- 2010: Marcus Miller – A Night in Monte Carlo – Live 2009
