= Rocky Gresset =

French jazz guitarist (born 1980)

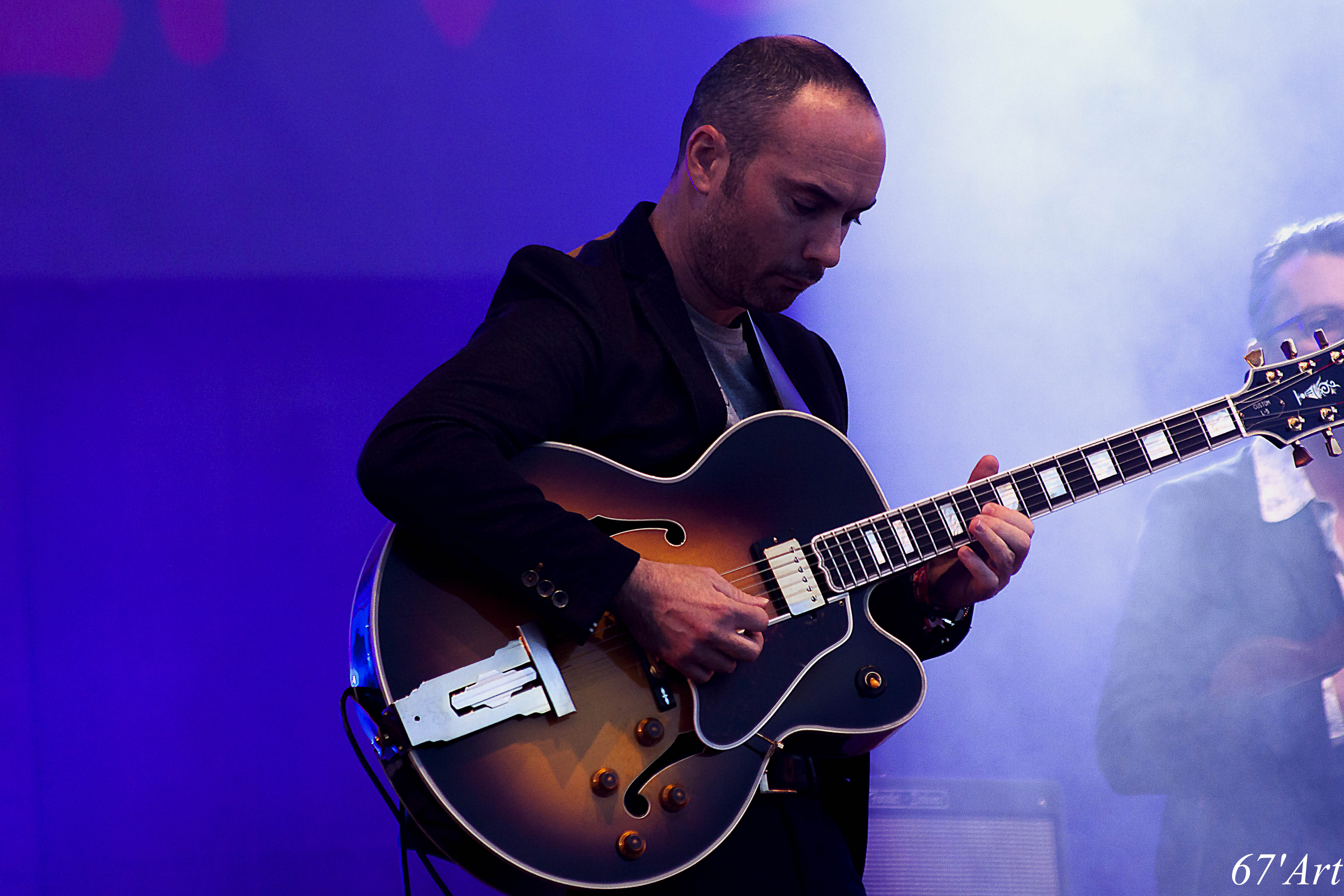
- Gresset performing on stage as part of Thomas Dutronc's band, 2015

Background information
- Born: 1980 (age 44–45)
- Genres: Gypsy jazz
- Occupation: Musician
- Instrument: Guitar
- Years active: 2000–present

Rocky Gresset (born 1980) is a French jazz guitarist.

== Biography ==
Having come from a musical family, Gresset started playing guitar at the age of nine. As a teenager, he studied the music of Django Reinhardt and the culture of the Manouches. Later, Gresset developed an admiration for guitarists such as Wes Montgomery, George Benson, and Pat Metheny. Christian Escoudé became his mentor; his first performances followed in the 2000s, including at the Django Reinhardt Festival. He worked with Lionel Belmondo, Stéphane Belmondo and Jean-Marc Jafet, among others. In 2005, he was involved in Lemmy Constantine's album Meeting Sinatra & Django. Gresset's self-titled debut album was released on the Dreyfus Records label in 2009, featuring violinist Costel Nitescu, rhythm guitarist Mathieu Chatelain and bassist Jeremie Arranger. The album contained mainly interpreted jazz standards, such as Time On My Hands, Just One of Those Things, Blue Skies or Here's That Rainy Day. In 2012, he released the duo album Entre Actes (Dreyfus Records) with Adrien Moignard, on which they covered standards like I'll Remember April and My Funny Valentine, as well as Django Reinhardt compositions, such as Belleville, and pop classics like How Deep Is Your Love.

== Discography ==
- Adrien Moignard, Rocky Gresset, Richard Manetti, Noé Reinhardt and Sébastien Giniaux: Selmer #607 (2008)
- Rocky Gresset (2009)
- Adrien Moignard and Rocky Gresset: Entre Actes (2012)
- Noé Reine, Costel Nitescu, Rocky Gresset, Rémi Oswald and Jérémie Arranger: Noé Reine (2015)
- Eric Legnini: Six Strings Under (2019)
