= Silver Rain =

Studio album by Marcus Miller
- Released: March 8, 2005
- Studio: Absolut Beats (Dallas, Texas); Camel Island Studios (Los Angeles, California); Hannibal Studios (Santa Monica, California); The Hit Factory and The Dormitory (New York City, New York); Vertical Sound Studios (Nashville, Tennessee)
- Genre: Jazz fusion
- Length: 75:24
- Label: Koch, JVC
- Producer: Marcus Miller; David Isaac

Marcus Miller chronology
Dreyfus Night in Paris (2003)	Silver Rain (2005)	Free (2007)

Professional ratings
Review scores
Source	Rating
Allmusic	3/5 stars
Tom Hull	B

Silver Rain is an album by bassist Marcus Miller. Named after a poem by Langston Hughes, it was released in 2005.

== Track listing ==
All compositions by Marcus Miller, except as noted.

1. "Intro Duction" – 0:30
2. "Bruce Lee" – 5:23
3. "La Villette" (Miller, Lalah Hathaway) – 5:54
4. "Behind The Smile" – 6:24
5. "Frankenstein" (Edgar Winter) – 6:33
6. "Moonlight Sonata" (Ludwig van Beethoven) – 7:38
7. "Boogie On Reggae Woman" (Stevie Wonder) – 5:02
8. "Paris (Interlude)" – 1:14
9. "Silver Rain" (Miller, Eric Clapton, Joey Kibble, Bill Withers) – 6:08
10. "Make Up My Mind" – 3:42
11. "Girls and Boys" (Prince) – 5:36
12. "Sophisticated Lady" (Duke Ellington, Irving Mills, Mitchell Parish) – 5:23
13. "Power of Soul" (Jimi Hendrix) – 6:53
14. "Outro Duction" – 0:53
15. "If Only For One Night" (Brenda Russell) -> "Silver Rain (reprise)" – 8:11

Japanese Release

1. "Intro Duction" - 0:30
2. "Bruce Lee" - 5:23
3. "La Villette" - 5:53
4. "Behind The Smile" - 6:24
5. "Frankenstein" - 6:33
6. "Moonlight Sonata" - 7:38
7. "Boogie On Reggae Woman" - 5:02
8. "Paris (Interlude)" - 1:14
9. "Silver Rain" - 6:08
10. "Make Up My Mind" - 3:42
11. "Girls & Boys" - 5:36
12. "Sophisticated Lady" - 5:23
13. "Power of Soul" - 6:53
14. "Outro Duction" - 0:53
15. "It'll Come Back to You" - 5:07 [Bonus Track]
16. "Silver Rain" (featuring Joey Kibble) - 6:37 [Bonus Track]

European Release

1. "Intro Duction" - 0:30
2. "Bruce Lee" - 5:23
3. "La Villette" - 5:53
4. "Behind The Smile" - 6:24
5. "Frankenstein" - 6:33
6. "Moonlight Sonata" - 7:38
7. "Boogie On Reggae Woman" - 5:02
8. "Paris (Interlude)" - 1:14
9. "Silver Rain" - 6:08
10. "Make Up My Mind" - 3:42
11. "Girls & Boys" - 5:36
12. "Sophisticated Lady" - 5:23
13. "Power of Soul" - 6:53
14. "Outro Duction" - 0:53
15. "The Lord's Prayer" - 2:40 [Bonus Track]
16. "Silver Rain" (Dub Mix) - 6:34 [Bonus Track]

== Personnel ==
- Marcus Miller – keyboards (1, 2, 6, 9, 12, 14), Fender Rhodes (1, 2, 4–8, 10, 11, 14), bass (1–7, 9, 11, 13–15), udu (1, 14), beat box (1–3, 14), scratches (1, 2, 14), talk box (2), hi-hat (2), acoustic piano (3, 6, 9), synth orchestra (3), Moog synthesizer (4, 10, 15), rhythm box (4), percussion (4), clavinet (5), tambourine (5), synth chords (6, 7), bass clarinet (6, 10–12, 15), synth melody (8), synth strings (8, 12), acoustic guitar (8), fretted bass (8), fretless bass (8, 12), finger snaps (8), guitars (9, 11), backing vocals (9), acoustic bass (10), drums (10), woodwind (10), organ (11), soprano saxophone (15)
- Bernard Wright – additional keyboards (2, 3, 6, 13)
- Bruce Flowers – organ (5, 13), Fender Rhodes (9, 13, 15), synth bass (13)
- Dean Brown – acoustic guitar (3, 4), guitars (3, 5, 6, 9, 11, 13, 15)
- Poogie Bell – brush snare (3), drums (4–7, 9, 13, 15)
- Roger Byam – tenor saxophone (5, 9, 11, 13, 15), tenor sax solo (6)
- Michael "Patches" Stewart – trumpet (2, 5, 6, 9, 11, 13, 15)

=== Guests ===
- Eartha Kitt – vocals (1)
- Lalah Hathaway – vocal samples (2), lead vocals (3)
- Gerald Albright – alto saxophone (2)
- Craig J "The Count" – percussion (3)
- Kenny Hicks – vocals, credited as "operatic tenor" (3)
- Munyungo Jackson – percussion (4)
- Gregoire Maret – harmonica (4, 8, 10)
- Kirk Whalum – tenor sax solo (5, 7)
- Mocean Worker – DJ effects, credited as "DJ Efx" (5, 7, 13)
- Lucky Peterson – guitars (6)
- Eric Clapton – vocals (9), guitar solo (9)
- Kenny Garrett – alto sax solo (9, 11)
- Jessica Celious – backing vocals (9)
- Joey Kibble – backing vocals (9)
- Mark Kibble – backing vocals (9)
- Ronald Bruner – drums (11)
- Macy Gray – vocals (11)

== Production ==
- Harold Goode – executive producer
- Harry Martin – executive producer
- Marcus Miller – executive producer, producer, arrangements, recording
- David Isaac – co-producer, recording, mixing (2, 4, 6, 8, 10–12)
- Dennis Thompson – recording, mixing (8, 10)
- Takamasa Honda – mixing (1, 12, 14), additional recording, assistant engineer, technical supervisor
- Ray Bardani – mixing (3, 5)
- Goh Hotoda – mixing (7, 13)
- Adam Dorn – additional recording
- The Dropper – additional recording
- Mark Kibble – additional recording
- Philippe Rose – additional recording
- Dave Huston – assistant engineer
- Kaori Kinoshita – assistant engineer
- Zach McNees – assistant engineer
- Bryan Russell – assistant engineer
- Joel Evenden – Pro Tools operator for Eric Clapton (9)
- Louie Teran – mastering (1–8, 10–15) at Marcussen Mastering (Hollywood, California)
- Jonathan Wyner – mastering (9) at M Works (Cambridge, Massachusetts)
- Bibi Green – production coordinator
- Gretchen ONeal – production coordinator
- Jack Frisch – art direction, design, additional photography
- Kumiko Higo – cover photography
- Reuben Jackson – liner notes
