= The Sun Don't Lie =

Studio album by Marcus Miller
- Released: November 18, 1993
- Studios: Camel Island (New Jersey); Axis Studios, Power Station, Right Track Recording, East Hill Studios and Soundtrack Studios (New York City, New York); Capitol Studios (Hollywood, California); Bill Schnee Studios (North Hollywood, California); Summa Studios (West Hollywood, California); Mankind Studios (Encino, California); Battery Studios (London, UK)
- Genre: Jazz fusion
- Length: 60:25
- Label: PRA
- Producer: Marcus Miller

Marcus Miller chronology
Music from Siesta (1987)	The Sun Don't Lie (1993)	Tales (1995)

The Sun Don't Lie is the third studio album by Marcus Miller, released in November 18, 1993 on PRA Records. The album reached No. 10 on the Billboard Jazz Albums chart. The album "is dedicated to the memory of Miles Davis."

== Accolades ==
The Sun Don't Lie was Grammy nominated in the category of Best Contemporary Jazz Performance.

== Critical reception ==
Professional ratings
Review scores
Source	Rating
AllMusic	3/5 stars

Gary Booth of the Financial Times declared "The sonorous and often foundation shaking bass guitar of Miller leads jazz funk/rock statesmen such as David Sanborn, Wayne Shorter and Omar Hakim through his own dark compositions." J. D. Considine of the Baltimore Sun also wrote "Great bass players rarely show off. It isn't that they don't have the chops – more often than not, what they lack is opportunity, an appropriate place to strut their place. But Marcus Miller has found his, and it's on The Sun Don't Lie. Alternating between fusion funk and moody jazz, Miller moves easily between solo and accompaniment."

== Track listing ==
All tracks composed by Marcus Miller; except where noted.

1. "Panther" – 6:02
2. "Steveland" – 7:21
3. "Rampage" – 5:48
4. "The Sun Don't Lie" – 6:29
5. "Scoop" – 5:59
6. "Mr. Pastorius" – 1:25
7. "Funny (All She Needs Is Love)" (Miller, Boz Scaggs) – 5:26
8. "Moons" – 4:52
9. "Teen Town" (Jaco Pastorius) – 4:55
10. "Juju" (Miller, Wayne Shorter) – 6:03
11. "The King Is Gone (For Miles)" – 6:05

== Personnel ==
=== Musicians ===
- Marcus Miller – keyboards (1–5, 7–8, 10–11), rhythm guitars (1, 3, 7), first half guitar solo (1), bass guitar (1–5, 7–11), drum programming (1, 3, 5, 8), bass clarinet (1–2, 5, 7–9, 11), percussion programming (2, 5, 8, 10), bass guitar solo (6), vocals (7), guitars (10)
- Jason Miles – sound programming (1–3), additional sound programming (7)
- Eric Persing – sound programming (4, 7, 10–11)
- Philippe Saisse – keyboards (9), additional sound programming (10)
- Dean Brown – lead guitar (1, 7), second half guitar solo (1)
- Poogie Bell – drums (1, 7, 10)
- Michael White – drums (4), drum fills (10)
- Lenny White – percussion (1), drums (2)
- Don Alias – percussion (2), congas (9)
- Paulinho da Costa – additional percussion (2), percussion (4, 9)
- Andy Narell – steel drums (4, 9)
- Wayne Shorter – tenor saxophone (2, 11), soprano saxophone (11)
- Everette Harp – soprano saxophone (7), alto saxophone (10)
- Jonathan Butler – guitars (2)
- David Sanborn – alto saxophone (2)
- Vernon Reid – guitars (3)
- Will Calhoun – drums (3)
- Miles Davis – trumpet (3)
- Sal Marquez – additional trumpet (3)
- Joe Sample – acoustic piano (4)
- Paul Jackson, Jr. – rhythm guitar (5)
- Kenny Garrett – alto saxophone (5)
- Maurice White – vocal samples (5)
- Steve Thornton – percussion (7)
- Michael "Patches" Stewart – trumpet (7)
- Hiram Bullock – guitars (9)
- Steve Ferrone – hi-hat (9), sidestick (9), bass drum (9)
- Omar Hakim – snare drum (9), bass drum (9), cymbals (9)
- Christian "Wicked" Wicht – additional keyboards (10)
- Kirk Whalum – tenor saxophone (10)
- Jonathan "Juice" Miller – funky count off (10)
- Julian "Juju" Miller – funky count off (10)
- Tony Williams – drums (11)

=== Production ===
- Marcus Miller – producer
- Bibi Green – production coordinator
- John Heiden – art direction, design
- Lorinda Sullivan – front cover photography
- Judith Farber – children's photography
- Patrick Rains & Associates – management

Technical credits

- Bob Ludwig – mastering at Masterdisk (New York, NY)
- Ray Bardani – mixing (1–3, 6, 8–10), recording
- Bill Schnee – mixing (4, 7, 11)
- Goh Hotoda – mixing (5)
- Ray Blair – recording
- Peter Doell – recording
- Leslie Ann Jones – recording
- Ron McQuaig – recording
- Yan Memmi – recording
- Bruce Miller – recording
- Marcus Miller – recording
- Brian Sperber – recording
- Vittorio Zammarano – recording
- Kurt Anderson – assistant engineer
- Thom Cadley – assistant engineer
- Scott Canto – assistant engineer
- Todd Childress – assistant engineer
- Ryan Dorn – assistant engineer
- Jim Giddens – assistant engineer
- Aaron Kropf – assistant engineer
- Jimmie Lee – assistant engineer
- Roger Lian – assistant engineer
- Chrystin Nevarez – assistant engineer
- Rich Novak – assistant engineer
- Brian Pollack – assistant engineer
- Chris Rich – assistant engineer
- Rob Rives – assistant engineer
- Frank Vialy – assistant engineer
- Todd Whitelock – assistant engineer
