= Francis Dreyfus =

French record producer

- Born: March 2, 1940; Le Raincy, Seine-Saint-Denis, France
- Died: June 24, 2010 (aged 70); Neuilly-sur-Seine, France
- Occupation: Record producer
- Known for: Founder of Disques Motors, Disques Dreyfus, and Dreyfus Jazz
- Notable work: Oxygène by Jean-Michel Jarre
- Children: Julie Dreyfus (with Pascale Audret)

Francis Dreyfus (French pronunciation: [fʁɑ̃sis dʁɛfys]; 2 March 1940 – 24 June 2010) was a French record producer, who focused on jazz and electronic music, publishing Jean-Michel Jarre's first commercially successful work, Oxygène.

1971, Dreyfus was the founder of the French record label, Disques Motors, and became the producer of Christophe. In 1985, he founded Disques Dreyfus. In 1991, Dreyfus also founded a jazz label called Dreyfus Jazz, whose artists have included Marcus Miller, Steve Grossman, Richard Galliano and Alan Stivell.

== Biography ==
Dreyfus was born in Le Raincy, Seine-Saint-Denis department of France, the son of a Romanian-Jewish mother and an Alsatian-Jewish father. He was a relative of Captain Alfred Dreyfus. He was the father of Laura, Chloe and actress Julie Dreyfus. He had the latter with Pascale Audret.

Francis Dreyfus died at the American Hospital of Paris in Neuilly-sur-Seine, a suburb of Paris, on 24 June 2010 at the age of 70.
