= Michel Petrucciani =

French jazz pianist (1962–1999)

- Petrucciani performing in 1991

Background information
- Born: 28 December 1962; Orange, Vaucluse, France
- Died: 6 January 1999 (aged 36) New York City, U.S.
- Genre: Jazz
- Occupation: Musician
- Instrument: Piano
- Years active: 1975–1999
- Labels: Owl, Blue Note, Dreyfus

Michel Petrucciani (French pronunciation: [miʃɛl petʁutʃani]; Italian: [petrutˈtʃaːni]; 28 December 1962 – 6 January 1999) was a French jazz pianist. From birth he had osteogenesis imperfecta, a genetic disease that causes brittle bones and, in his case, short stature. Despite his health condition and relatively short life, he became one of the most accomplished jazz pianists of his generation.

== Biography ==
=== Early years ===
Michel Petrucciani's family had Neapolitan heritage and lived in Montélimar, France, in the south of France. They were a musical family; his father, Tony, and his brother Philippe both played guitar, while his brother Louis played bass. Petrucciani was born in nearby Orange, Vaucluse having osteogenesis imperfecta, a genetic disease that causes brittle bones and, in his case, short stature. It is also often linked to pulmonary ailments. The disease caused his bones to fracture over 100 times before he reached adolescence and gave him pain throughout his entire life. In Michel's early career, his father and brother occasionally carried him because he could not walk far on his own unaided. In certain respects he considered his disability an advantage, as it got rid of distractions like sports that other boys tended to become involved in.

I have pain all the time. I'm used to having hurt arms... Sometimes I think someone upstairs saved me from being ordinary.

— Petrucciani, The New Republic

At an early age, Michel saw Duke Ellington on television and wished to become a pianist like him. When Michel was four, his father bought him a toy piano of his own, but Michel smashed the piano with a toy hammer. Soon after this, Michel's father bought him a real piano.

When I was young, I thought the keyboard looked like teeth. It was as though it was laughing at me. You had to be strong enough to make the piano feel little. That took a lot of work.

— Petrucciani, The Independent

From the beginning, Petrucciani had always been musical, reportedly humming Wes Montgomery solos by the time he learned to speak. He began learning classical piano at the age of four, and was making music with his family by the age of nine. The musician who would prove most influential to Petrucciani was Bill Evans, who he started listening to at around age ten. Petrucciani's layered harmonies, lyrical style, and articulation of melody would always be linked most strongly to his early exposure to Evans.

=== Music career in Paris ===
Petrucciani gave his first professional concert at the age of 13. At this age he was quite fragile and had to be carried to and from the piano. His hands were average in length, but his size meant that he required aids to reach the piano's pedals.

Petrucciani felt he needed to move to Paris to begin his musical career, but found it difficult to leave home. His father was protective and constantly concerned for his son's well-being, hoping to protect him from danger. Petrucciani's drummer Aldo Romano took a less charitable view, thinking that Michel's father was jealous and just wanted to keep Petrucciani at home to serve as his own musical partner. After some difficulty, Romano prevailed and took Petrucciani—at age fifteen—to Paris for the first time.

In Paris, Petrucciani started playing with Kenny Clarke in 1977 and Clark Terry in 1978. His breakthrough performance occurred at the Cliousclat jazz festival. Terry needed a pianist, and when Petrucciani was carried onto the stage and the trumpeter saw Petrucciani's stature, at first he thought it was a prank, only later revising the remark. Indeed Petrucciani astounded the festival with his prodigious talent and virtuosity.

He was a dwarf, but he played like a giant.

— Clark Terry, The Independent

Drugs and encounters with unsavory women made Petrucciani's time in Paris a mixed experience, but musically and personally it was unequivocally transforming. Despite his considerable talent, his clownish attitude and odd behaviors were seen as immature and insecure. He was foul-mouthed, wore a yachtsman's cap and frequently acted pushy and tough, referring to people as "baby". Nevertheless, his work in Kenny Clarke's trio during his time in Paris set him on a clear path to stardom.

After his stint in Paris, Petrucciani briefly returned home before beginning his professional life. Living with Romano, he was free of the protective presence of his father and began enjoying an independent lifestyle. He began recording for Owl Records and struck up a friendship with the company's owner, Jean-Jacques Pussiau. Pussiau felt that Petrucciani always seemed to be in a hurry to record, which he attributed to Petrucciani's own awareness that his life would be short. Before long, Petrucciani desired independence from Romano, too.

He didn't feel free with me. So he had to kill his "second father" somehow to move on. He needed to escape. He needed to go very far, as far as he could go, and that was California.

— Aldo Romano, The New Republic

Petrucciani travelled to the U.S., possibly stopping in New York on the way. As was the case throughout his life, exact details were hard to pin down when it came to Petrucciani:

He would lie to your face... In one [story], he scammed his way to New York on bad checks, then had to hide out in Brooklyn with the help of Sicilian family connections. In another, he played piano for trade in a midtown brothel, where he learned the secrets of love.

— Thierry Peremarti, The New Republic

=== With Charles Lloyd in New York ===
In 1982, Petrucciani visited saxophonist Charles Lloyd in California. Lloyd had stopped playing when people began to view his sidemen as more fashionable than himself. After hearing Petrucciani play, Lloyd was so inspired that he agreed to come out of retirement and tour with him. Petrucciani and Lloyd's tour of the West Coast of the United States was a huge success and they continued internationally. On 22 February 1985, with Petrucciani cradled in his arms, Lloyd walked onto the stage at Town Hall in New York City and sat him on his piano stool for what would be an historic evening in jazz history: the filming of One Night with Blue Note. The film's director John Charles Jopson would later recall in the reissued liner notes that the moment moved him to tears.

Petrucciani and Lloyd's performance at the Montreux Jazz Festival was made into an album, and in 1982, they won the 1982 Prix d'Excellence. But Petrucciani expressed mostly disdain and frustration at the awards he felt were being heaped upon him, believing that he was receiving so many at least in part because people believed he was going to die young.

Petrucciani moved to New York City in 1984 and spent the rest of his life there. This was the most productive period of his career. In 1986 he was recorded at the Montreux Jazz Festival with Wayne Shorter and Jim Hall, producing the trio album Power of Three. He also played with diverse figures in the U.S. jazz scene including Dizzy Gillespie.

Throughout his career, Petrucciani also made a priority of recording solo piano:

I really believe a pianist is not complete until he's capable of playing by himself. I started doing solo concerts in February 1993, when I asked my agent to cancel my trio dates for a year in order to play nothing but solo recitals... I had a wonderful time playing alone, and discovering the piano and really studying every night. I felt like I was learning so much about the instrument and about communicating directly with an audience... I really loved doing that, and afterwards getting on stage with a group again and playing with other people was a piece of cake!

== Personal life ==
Petrucciani had five significant personal relationships: Erlinda Montano (marriage), Eugenia Morrison, Marie-Laure Roperch, the Italian pianist Gilda Buttà (the marriage lasted three months and ended in divorce) and Isabelle Mailé (with whom he shares his grave). With Marie-Laure he fathered a son, Alexandre, who inherited his genetic disorder. He also had a stepson named Rachid Roperch.

In 1994, he was granted the Order of the Légion d'honneur in Paris.

In the late 1990s, Petrucciani's lifestyle became increasingly taxing. He was overworked, performing over 100 times per year, and in 1998, the year before he died, he performed 140 times. He became too weak to use crutches and had to resort to a wheelchair. He was also recording, doing television appearances, and constantly doing interviews. In his later years Petrucciani was known to drink heavily.

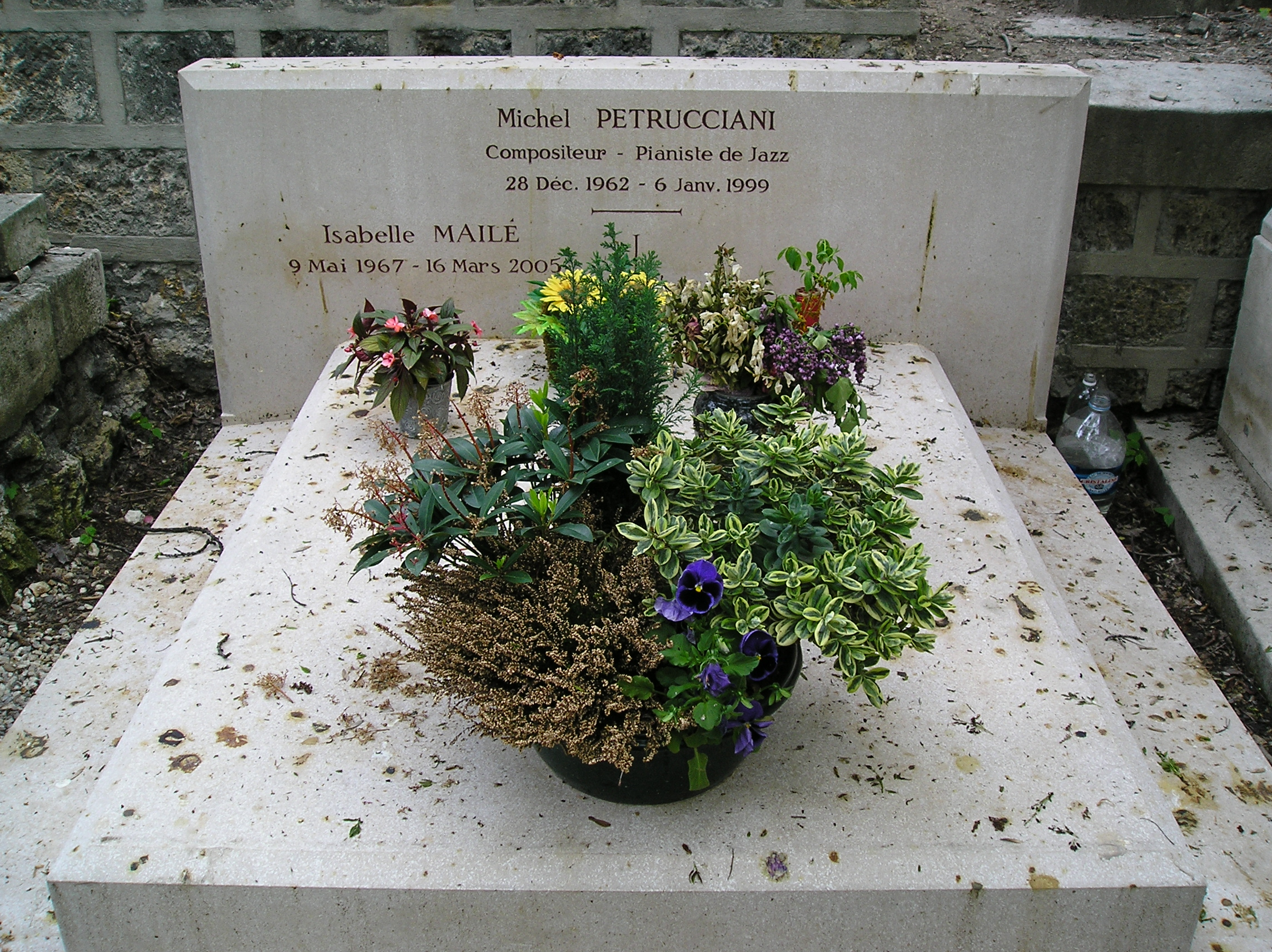
Petrucciani's grave

Petrucciani died from a pulmonary infection a week after his 36th birthday. He was interred in Le Père Lachaise Cemetery in Paris, one tomb away from Frédéric Chopin.

On 12 February 2009, the French music channel Mezzo broadcast a special event paying homage to Petrucciani close to the 10th anniversary of his death.

The first two American albums featuring Petrucciani were produced by Gabreal Franklin. The first, 100 Hearts, a solo album, was produced at the famous RCA Studio A, on the Avenue of the Americas in New York City. The second was a trio album, recorded live at Max Gordon's old Village Vanguard club in New York City. These were among the first albums to use digital recording technology, on Mitsubishi X80 recorders, so early on that the only manuals available were in Japanese; but Franklin and Tom Arrison managed to get them to function by trial and error.

In 1985, a concert at the Village Vanguard in New York was recorded on video.

== Personality and musical style ==
Osteogenesis imperfecta seemed to contribute greatly both to Petrucciani's personality and his playing style. By his own account, he was in almost constant physical pain. Yet, he was known for his cheerful, playful, even cavalier personality. He said, "I love humor; I love to laugh, I love jokes, I love silliness. I love that; I think it's great. I think laughter is worth a whole lot of medicine."

Though he often exhibited arrogance and even womanizing tendencies in his adolescent years, the defining characteristic of Petrucciani was his confidence. Michael Zwerin recalled one example: "We were sitting there wondering what to play. It was kind of hot. And Michel said, 'anybody know "Giant Steps"? Neither Louis nor I wanted to admit we didn't really know it. So there was this great silence. And Michel said, "Well, I do!" and he pounded into a solo version of it at a very fast clip, and it was really amazing. That to me is Michel—'Well, I do!' Man, a confidence you wouldn't believe."

Petrucciani had a quirky side; in a Mezzo documentary, he can be heard saying in a humorous voice, "I am very short!" Pussiau, the owner of Owl Records, recalled when he used to carry Michel for convenience. "Sometimes, when I used to carry him, he would bite my ear. We'd walk into a restaurant, and he'd chomp."

During his last years in New York, it seemed Petrucciani's general attitude of carelessness was magnified. He said to his manager, "I want to have at least five women at once, I want to make a million dollars in one night." In an interview, he said: "My handicap is not mortal. I won't die because of my handicap. It has nothing to do with that." He also said, "Eventually, when I get to be 75, I'll write a book on my deathbed." Yet other reliable sources assert that he was always aware of the potential effects of osteogenesis imperfecta.

Petrucciani was fiercely determined to take all the joy and satisfaction from life that he could. "I'm a brat", he said. "My philosophy is to have a really good time and never let anything stop me from doing what I want to do. It's like driving a car, waiting for an accident. That's no way to drive a car. If you have an accident, you have an accident—c'est la vie." He lived true to his maxim. A week before he died of a pulmonary infection, he was up all night celebrating the new year with his friends.

Stylistically, Petrucciani is most frequently compared to Bill Evans and Keith Jarrett for his lyricism and Oscar Peterson for his virtuosity. His playing was often quite dramatic; critics accuse him of over-indulgence and cheap showmanship, sometimes dismissing his music as being too accessible. Petrucciani was loose and playful in a rhythm section, and gave attention to a strong articulation of the melody. He sometimes paused at the peaks of his solo lines before descending again, as if in appreciation of his idea.

Petrucciani distinguished himself most obviously from his primary inspiration in that he lacked Bill Evans's cerebral approach to the piano. His interest was primarily in simply playing; he spent little time reharmonizing or arranging:

When I play, I play with my heart and my head and my spirit ... I don't play to people's heads, but to their hearts.

Despite this emphasis on performance, he disliked applause, calling it old-fashioned and a distraction. Regarding "mistakes" that occur in improvised jazz, Petrucciani complained that the clarity with which he crafts his solo lines has the disadvantage of also exposing the former more clearly.

Wayne Shorter, a fellow jazz giant, summed up Petrucciani's essential character and style:

There's a lot of people walking around, full-grown and so-called normal—they have everything that they were born with at the right leg length, arm length, and stuff like that. They're symmetrical in every way, but they live their lives like they are armless, legless, brainless, and they live their life with blame. I never heard Michel complain about anything. Michel didn't look in the mirror and complain about what he saw. Michel was a great musician—a great musician—and great, ultimately, because he was a great human being because he had the ability to feel and give to others of that feeling, and he gave to others through his music.

— Wayne Shorter, The New Republic

== Discography ==
=== As leader/co-leader ===
- Flash (Bingow, 1980)
- Michel Petrucciani (Owl, 1981)
- Date with Time (Celluloid, 1981)
- Estate (IRD, 1982)
- Darn that Dream (Celluloid, 1982)
- Toot Sweet with Lee Konitz (Owl, 1982) – live
- Oracle's Destiny (Owl, 1983) – rec. 1982
- 100 Hearts (Concord/The George Wein Collection, 1984) – rec. 1983
- Note'n Notes (Owl, 1984)
- Live at the Village Vanguard (Concord, 1985) – live rec. 1984
- Cold Blues with Ron McClure (Owl, 1985)
- Pianism (Blue Note, 1986) – rec. 1985
- Power of Three with Wayne Shorter and Jim Hall (Blue Note, 1987) – live rec. 1986
- Michel plays Petrucciani (Blue Note, 1988) – rec. 1987
- Music (Blue Note, 1989)
- Playground (Blue Note, 1991)
- Promenade with Duke (Blue Note, 1993)
- Live (Blue Note, 1994) – live rec. 1991 at Arsenal de Metz
- Marvellous (Dreyfus, 1994)
- Conference De Presse with Eddy Louiss (Dreyfus, 1994)
- Au Theatre Des Champs-Élysées (Dreyfus, 1994) – live
- Flamingo with Stéphane Grappelli (Dreyfus, 1996) – rec. 1995
- Michel Petrucciani (Dreyfus, 1996)
- Both Worlds (Dreyfus, 1997)
- Solo Live in Germany (Dreyfus, 1998) – live rec. 1997

Posthumous releases

- Trio in Tokyo with Steve Gadd and Anthony Jackson (Dreyfus, 1999) – live rec. 1997
- Conversations With Michel with Bob Malach (Go Jazz, 2000) – rec. 1988–1989
- Conversation with Tony Petrucciani (Dreyfus, 2001) – rec. 1992
- Dreyfus Night in Paris with Marcus Miller, Biréli Lagrène, Lenny White, Kenny Garrett (Dreyfus, 2003) – live rec. 1994
- Piano Solo - The Complete Concert In Germany (Dreyfus, 2007)[2CD] – live rec. 1997
- Michel Petrucciani & NHOP (Live) (Dreyfus, 2009)[2CD] – live rec. 1994
- Both Worlds Live North Sea Jazz Festival (Dreyfus, 2016)[2CD + DVD-Video] – live at North Sea Jazz Festival plus bonus CD including live at Montreux Jazz Festival
- One Night In Karlsruhe (Jazzhaus, 2019) – live rec. 1988
- Solo in Denmark (Storyville, 2022) – live rec. 1990, at the Riverboat Jazz Festival in Silkeborg

Compilations

- The Complete Recordings of Michel Petrucciani: The Blue Note Years 1986–1994 (Blue Note, 1998)
- Concerts Inedits (Dreyfus, 1999)[3CD]
- Days of Wine and Roses: 1981-1985 (Owl, 2000)[2CD]
- So What: Best of Michel Petrucciani (Dreyfus, 2004)
- The Blue Note Albums (Blue Note, 2015)[9CD]
- The Montreux Years (BMG/Montreux, 2023)[CD/2LP] – rec. 1990–1998

=== As a member ===
The Manhattan Project
(With Wayne Shorter, Stanley Clarke, Lenny White, Gil Goldstein and Pete Levin)

- The Manhattan Project (Blue Note, 1990) – rec. 1989

=== As sideman ===
With Charles Lloyd

- Montreux 82 (Elektra Musician, 1983) – live rec. 1982 at Montreux Jazz Festival
- A Night in Copenhagen (Blue Note, 1985) – live rec. 1983
- One Night with Blue Note (Blue Note, 1985) Volume 4 – live

With others

- Steve Grossman, Quartet (Dreyfus Jazz, 1999) – rec. 1998
- Joe Lovano, From the Soul (Blue Note, 1992) – rec. 1991
- Serge Forté, Thanks for All (Ella Productions, 2004) – rec. 1997

== Tributes ==
- A mosaic of a piano by Édouard Detmer in his honor was included on the Place Michel-Petrucciani in the 18th arrondissement of Paris.
- Michel recorded a piano solo on "Why Do You Do Things Like That?" on Patrick Rondat's On the Edge, which was released the same year as Petrucciani's death. Patrick Rondat dedicated this album to him.
- "Waltz For Michel Petrucciani", a song on the Finnish jazz Trio Töykeät's album Kudos, is dedicated to him.
- Christian Jacob's Contradictions is a tribue album containing imaginative reinterpretions of eleven Petrucciani compositions.
- "Simply Marvellous (Celebrating the Music of Michel Petrucciani)" is a Jazz album released in 2012 by Tommaso Starace featuring nine of Petrucciani's most celebrated compositions.
- "To Mike P.", a composition by the Italian jazz pianist Nico Marziliano, is dedicated to him.

== See also ==
- French jazz
