= Dreyfus Records =

French record label

- Parent company: Francis Dreyfus Music; BMG
- Founded: 1980
- Distributors: BMG (except Jean-Michel Jarre); Sony Music (Jean-Michel Jarre catalog)
- Genre: Jazz
- Country of origin: France
- Location: Paris
- Official website: disquesdreyfus.com

Dreyfus Records (/ˈdreɪfəs/; French: Disques Dreyfus, [disk dʁɛfys]) is a record label which released the work of artists such as Jean-Michel Jarre who was part of the label for more than 20 years.

Francis Dreyfus founded Disques Dreyfus no later than 1980, expanding to the United States in 1985. The label was a part of the Dreyfus family company owned by Dreyfus Records, French music distributor. On January 4, 2013 the company ceased its operations and its catalog was absorbed by BMG Rights Management Group.

Dreyfus Jazz was founded in 1991 in Paris as a division of the Francis Dreyfus Music company to reissue albums by Charlie Haden, Eddy Louiss, Red Mitchell, Michel Portal, Bud Powell, John Lewis, and Martial Solal. In 1992 Dreyfus produced new recordings by Philip Catherine, Richard Galliano, Steve Grossman, Roy Haynes, Didier Lockwood, the Mingus Big Band, and Michel Petrucciani. There were also albums of unreleased music by Bill Evans, Stan Getz, and Art Pepper.

== Partial roster ==
- Adan Jodorowsky
- Franck Avitabile
- Philip Catherine
- Christophe
- Anne Ducros
- Hadrien Feraud
- Richard Galliano
- Steve Grossman
- Roy Haynes
- Ari Hoenig
- Ahmad Jamal
- Jean-Michel Jarre
- Bert Joris
- Olivier Ker Ourio
- Biréli Lagrène
- Sara Lazarus
- Didier Lockwood
- Eddy Louiss
- Sylvain Luc
- Marcus Miller
- Mingus Big Band
- Térez Montcalm
- Lucky Peterson
- Michel Petrucciani
- Jean-Michel Pilc
- Aldo Romano
- Luis Salinas
- Dorado Schmitt
- Alan Stivell
- Trio Esperança
- Klement Julienne
- Rocky Gresset

== See also ==
- Le Petit Journal Montparnasse, a Paris jazz club associated with the label
- List of record labels
