= The New in You =

Studio album by California State University, Los Angeles Jazz Ensemble
- Released: 1985
- Recorded: Sage and Sound Recording; Hollywood, California
- Genre: Jazz, Big band
- Length: 33:03
- Label: HDC Music Publications
- Producer: David Caffey

California State University, Los Angeles Jazz Ensemble chronology
Crusade (1980)	The New in You (1985)	We're Back! (1986)
- cat. # CSULA 885

Audio sample
- "The New in You": file; help

The New in You is a 1985 album by the California State University, Los Angeles Jazz Ensemble. It was the group's first recording under the direction of David Caffey. The group's student musicians have included Sharon Hirata, Luis Bonilla, Phil Feather, Jack Cooper, Charlie Richard, Mark Gutierrez, and Jose Arellano.

== Background ==
In 1984 and 1985 the California State University, Los Angeles Music Department and CSULA Associated Students decided to fund LP recordings of the jazz ensemble to better serve as a teaching tool for student music, jazz groups. The New In You is the first of six albums to come from CSULA during the 1980s featuring the award winning CSULA #1 Jazz Ensemble. The LP contains tracks from the #1 CSULA Jazz Ensemble to include compositions of three students, one from the director (professor David Caffey), and two from Neil Slater.

There is a consistent tradition of musicians coming from the CSULA program who have worked with major musical acts, on major studio and movie projects, and hold positions in higher education in music. The roster on this album is self-evident as to the diversity and level of student musicians CSULA developed at that time and had for many years dating far back to musicians (graduates) such as Lennie Niehaus and Gabe Baltazar.

== Track listing ==
All tracks are written by various artists listed.

No.	Title	Length
1.	"Inside Outfluence (Neil Slater)"	5:40
2.	"First Love (Mark Gutierrez)"	6:08
3.	"The New In You (Jack Cooper)"	3:57
4.	"Sierra Sunset (David Caffey)"	3:10
5.	"Struttin' (David Caffey)"	5:35
6.	"Places (Neil Slater)"	6:38
7.	"Darn That Dream (Jimmy Van Heusen, arr. Charles Richard)"	3:15
Total length:		33:03

== Recording Sessions ==
- Recorded: May 25 and 31 1985, Sage and Sound Recording, Hollywood, California
- Mixing: June 14, 1985 Sage and Sound Recording, Hollywood, California

== Print music from this recording ==
- Inside Outfluence is published by Neil Slater Publications
- The New In You was commissioned by the Cypress College Jazz Ensemble, George Beyer - director and is published by UNC Jazz Press
- Sierra Sunset is published by UNC Jazz Press
- Struttin' is published by UNC Jazz Press
- Places is published by Neil Slater Publications

== Personnel ==
=== Musicians ===
- Conductor: David Caffey
- Saxes and woodwinds: Charlie Richard, Sharon Hirata, Phil Feather, Jack Cooper, Randall Wills, David Holland, Scott Ackerman
- Trumpets and flugelhorns: Tim Neff, Ken Montgomery, Barry Russell, John Le Febvre
- Trombones: Gary Smith, Luis Bonilla, José Arellano, John Sandhagen
- Guitar and Piano: Mark Gutierrez
- Bass: Gerald Stockton
- Drums: John Severino

=== Production ===
- Recording engineers: Jim Mooney
- Mixing engineers: Jim Mooney and David Caffey
- Mastering: K Disc
- Cover art: Randy Piland
