= Bob Curnow =

American trombonist (born 1941)

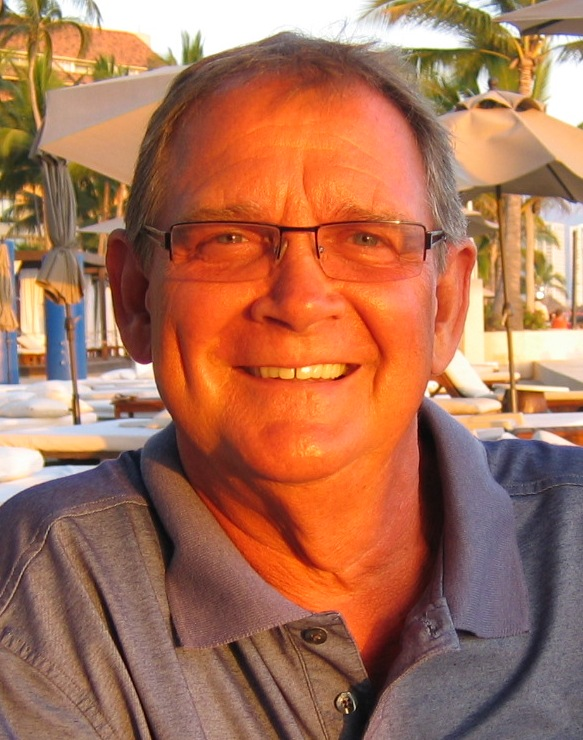

Background information
- Born: Robert Harry Curnow; November 1, 1941 (age 85)
- Origin: Easton, Pennsylvania, United States
- Genres: Fusion; Bop; Big band Swing; Symphonic jazz
- Occupations: Trombonist, Conductor, Composer, Arranger, Music Producer, Educator, Music publisher
- Instruments: Trombone; Piano; Bass

Robert Harry Curnow (born November 1, 1941) is an American musician who served as a trombonist, staff arranger and producer for the Stan Kenton Orchestra during the 1960s and 1970s. As a composer and arranger, he has become well known for large ensemble jazz music set to contemporary fusion and rock music of groups such as Chicago, Blood, Sweat and Tears, and the Yellowjackets. Most notably, he arranged the music for and produced the award-winning and critically acclaimed CD, Bob Curnow's L.A. Big Band Plays The Music of Pat Metheny and Lyle Mays. His compositions and arrangements are heavily influenced by earlier writers for the Stan Kenton Orchestra such as Pete Rugolo, Bill Russo, Johnny Richards and Bill Holman. Curnow is currently owner and President of Sierra Music Publications, Inc., he is also prominent in the instrumental music and jazz education fields.

== Early life, musical education and influences ==
Bob Curnow was born and grew up in Easton, Pennsylvania and was first exposed to music through learning the trumpet at age 9 but then switched to baritone horn. He ultimately started to play the trombone at age 12. Curnow had started high school when he first heard the Stan Kenton Orchestra with Kai Winding on the 45 single Collaboration. While in college, he met Stan Kenton in person in 1961 during the Stan Kenton Band Clinics. Curnow worked his way through college playing the string bass and he graduated from West Chester University in May 1963.

== Professional career ==
=== with Stan Kenton ===
On May 19 of 1963 (1 day after college graduation) Bob Curnow started as a trombonist with the Stan Kenton Orchestra at the age of 21 touring all of the United States and the UK through the end of November; this was the last of Kenton's Mellophonium Bands and the group disbanded after this tour until 1965. During this tour Curnow had arranged "God Save The Queen" for the orchestra; this would be his entry into the cadre of Kenton composers and arrangers. He recorded in the trombone section of the Kenton Orchestra for Capitol Records on the LP's Artistry In Voices And Brass and From The Creative World Of Stan Kenton Comes Jean Turner.

=== Back to school and teaching ===
After leaving the Stan Kenton Orchestra he did graduate work at Michigan State University in East Lansing, Michigan from 1964 through 1967 earning two master's degrees and completing his doctoral course work. He served as Professor of Instrumental Music and director of the Jazz Lab bands at Case Western Reserve University in Cleveland, Ohio from 1967 through 1973, then becoming A&R director back with the Stan Kenton Orchestra.

=== As producer for Stan Kenton ===
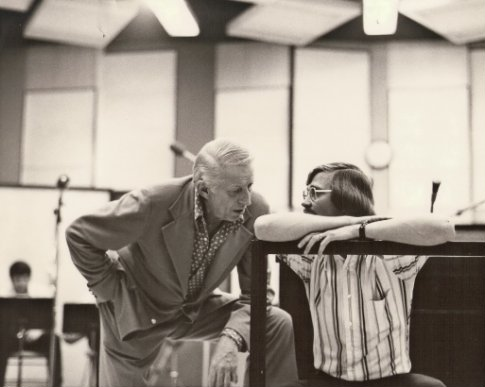
Stan Kenton & Bob Curnow United-Western Studios, Los Angeles National Anthems of the World sessions

By 1971 Curnow was contacted again by Stan Kenton to do the arrangements for a new concept, double LP, National Anthems Of The World. Kenton remembered the earlier arrangement done in 1963 of "God Save The Queen", this sparked the interest of Kenton and led to Curnow serving as chief arranger, conductor, and the producer for the new 1972 concept album. Though the recordings ended up being a commercial failure for the Stan Kenton Orchestra, the project became a high point for Curnow as an arranger and record producer. After the National Anthems project Curnow stepped in on numerous dates for an ailing Kenton to conduct during that next year.

In June 1973, at the age of 31, Curnow was hired as the Director of Artists & Repertoire; by August Kenton fired the general manager and Curnow was in charge of the complete Creative World operations. Starting with the LP 7.5 On The Richter Scale, Curnow was the producer for 6 of the final 7 Stan Kenton studio albums for Creative World leading up to Kenton's death in August 1979. He also oversaw the re-issue of numerous LPs from Kenton's Capitol Records catalogue. During this tenure with Kenton he was in charge as composer, arranger, and producer of one of the last commercial successes the band was to have with Stan Kenton plays Chicago.

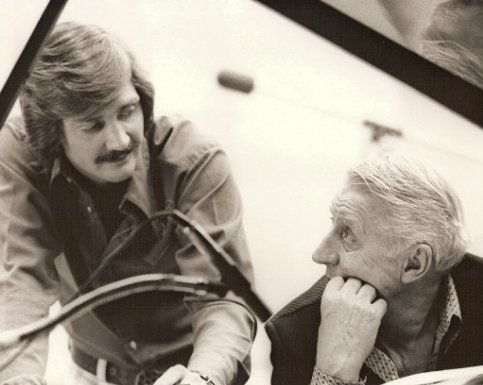
Bob Curnow & Stan Kenton Universal Studios, Chicago June 1974 Stan Kenton plays Chicago sessions

During this period as a younger composer, arranger and producer, Curnow was able to help usher in a new, more vital concept and style for the orchestra which helped appeal to a younger music audience of the post big band/rock n' roll era. Due to deteriorating business conditions with the Stan Kenton Orchestra and Creative World Records, Curnow resigned from his post in 1976. Curnow is quoted as to the frustration he encountered, "I was burnt out...I really didn't like the record business...it's a dirty game working with the big players and all the crap that goes on there". Kenton's 1977 album Journey To Capricorn would be the last studio-produced project for the orchestra and the final LP for which Curnow served as producer for Creative World.

=== CSULA and the McDonald's All-American High School Band ===
In 1976 Curnow accepted the position as Director of Jazz Studies at California State University, Los Angeles; he held that position until 1987. He conducted the No. 1 Jazz Ensemble, the Brass Ensemble, Symphonic Band and the Wind Ensemble. For eight years (1981–1989) Curnow directed the McDonald's All-American High School Jazz Band, touring the country and discovering many talented young jazz players.

=== Pat Metheny's music and Sierra Publishing ===
Curnow ultimately penned some twelve arrangements of compositions by Pat Metheny and/or Lyle Mays; the initial arrangement of Metheny's The First Circle was tested out and recorded on a critically acclaimed school jazz LP at California State University, Los Angeles. These works and the resulting CD album from 1994, Bob Curnow's L.A. Big Band Plays the Music of Pat Metheny and Lyle Mays have been called a prime example of the art of arranging for large jazz ensemble in a contemporary setting. A second CD was released in 2011 entitled The Music of Pat Metheny & Lyle Mays, Volume II by the Bob Curnow Big Band.

Since 1976 Curnow has been the C.E.O. of Sierra Music Publications, Inc. The company publishes music from the Stan Kenton Orchestra library as well as many other large jazz ensemble scores and Radiohead arrangements.

In 2005, Curnow was given the Distinguished Music Alumnus Award by the West Chester University School of Music. Curnow has donated almost $60,000 worth of musical compositions, CDs and books to the School of Music Jazz Studies Area.

== Jazz education and former students ==
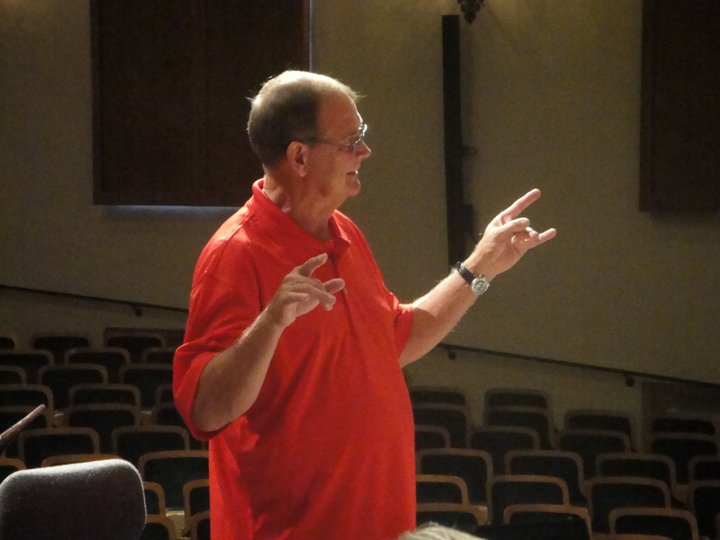
Bob Curnow conducting in PA, 2010

Curnow is a strong advocate of jazz education and has been very involved since being a part of the well known Stan Kenton Band Clinics when first associated with the group in 1963. As well as holding academic positions at universities, he has served as a guest conductor and educational clinician for groups and organizations throughout the United States and Canada. He has served as a guest artist, adjudicator, conductor, or clinician at colleges and jazz festivals over the past 30 years throughout the world.

== Select discography ==
- 1963 Artistry in Voices and Brass Stan Kenton (Capitol) – as performer
- 1963 Stan Kenton / Jean Turner Stan Kenton (Capitol) – as performer
- 1963 Kenton '63, Concert in England Stan Kenton (Astral Jazz) – as performer and arranger
- 1972 National Anthems of the World Stan Kenton (Creative World Records) – as arranger/conductor/producer
- 1973 7.5 on the Richter Scale. Stan Kenton (Creative World Records) – as arranger/conductor/producer
- 1974 Stan Kenton plays Chicago, Stan Kenton (Creative World Records) – as composer/arranger/conductor/producer
- 1974 Fire, Fury and Fun Stan Kenton (Creative World Records) – as producer
- 1976 Kenton '76 Stan Kenton (Creative World Records) – as producer
- 1976 Journey Into Capricorn Stan Kenton (Creative World Records) – as producer
- 1978 CSULA Jazz Ensemble Cal State L.A. Jazz Ensemble (CSULA, ℗1978) – as producer/composer/arranger/conductor
- 1980 Crusade Cal State L.A. Jazz Ensemble (CSULA, ℗1980) – as producer/composer/arranger/conductor
- 1984 Coast to Coast The McDonald's All-American High School Jazz Band – as producer/composer/arranger/conductor
- 1986 We're Back! Cal State L.A. Jazz Ensemble (CSULA 886) – as arranger
- 1992 Dick Shearer and His Stan Kenton Spirits Dick Shearer (Americatone Records) – as composer/arranger
- 1994 The Music of Pat Metheny and Lyle Mays The Bob Curnow L.A. Big Band (MAMA Records) – as composer/arranger/conductor
- 2003 Towednack Bob Curnow and the SWR Band (CK Records) – as composer/arranger/conductor
- 2003 Big Band Reflections of Cole Porter Jazz Orchestra of the Delta (Summit Records) – liner notes
- 2003 Upside Out RCC Jazz Ensemble (Seabreeze Vista) – as composer/arranger
- 2011 The Music of Pat Metheny and Lyle Mays – Volume II The Bob Curnow Big Band (Sierra Records) – as composer/arranger/conductor

== Bibliography ==
- Steven Harris. The Kenton Kronicles. Dynaflow Publications. 2000. ISBN 0-9676273-0-3
- William F. Lee, Audree Coke Kenton. Stan Kenton: Artistry In Rhythm. Creative Press of Los Angeles. 1980.
- Michael Sparke, Peter Venudor. Stan Kenton, The Studio Sessions. Balboa Books. 1998. ISBN 0-936653-82-5
- Michael Sparke. Stan Kenton: This Is An Orchestra. University of North Texas Press. 2010. ISBN 1-57441-284-1
