= Live at Redlands University =

Live album by Stan Kenton Orchestra
- Released: 1970
- Recorded: August 3–5, 1970
- Studio: (live) Redlands University, Redlands, California, United States
- Genre: Jazz, Big band
- Length: 74:53
- Label: Creative World Records, GNP Crescendo
- Producer: Dick Shearer

Stan Kenton Orchestra chronology
Hair (1969)	Live at Redlands University (1970)	Live at Brigham Young University (1971)

Live at Redlands University is a double live album by American jazz musician Stan Kenton and his orchestra, released in late 1970 by Creative World Records. It was the initial release on Kenton's newly formed record company after he broke his relationship with Capitol Records. Recording for the album took place in Southern California at Redlands University in August 1970.

The album's influence on future large ensemble jazz composition and arranging has led critiques to acknowledge it as an influential album of the later Kenton orchestras and of the 1970s. The album is a class production, and musically a success to interpret the Kenton style in contemporary terms in a live setting.

== Background ==
Up to the time of Live At Redlands University the band had released recordings with Capitol. The 1969 Capitol release of Stan Kenton: the music of 'HAIR' was the last Kenton LP with that label and was moving in a direction beyond away from which the Kenton 'brand name' had been built on since 1943. He had no involvement in the Hair LP except for Kenton's name placed on the jacket cover; Ralph Carmichael and Lennie Niehaus were placed in charge of the project. Capitol producer Lee Gillette was trying to exploit the money making possibilities of the popular 1968 musical featuring contemporary rock music. Due to lack of promotion by Capitol, the LP was a financial failure; this would be the last release for Kenton under the aegis of Capitol.

The transition from Capitol to Creative World Records in 1970 was fraught with difficulties during a time when the music business was changing rapidly. As a viable jazz artist who was trying to keep a loyal but dwindling following, Kenton turned to arrangers such as Hank Levy and Bob Curnow to write material that appealed to a younger audience. The first release for the Creative World label were live concerts and Kenton had the control he wanted over content but lacked substantial resources to engineer, mix, and promote what Capitol underwrote in the past. Kenton would take a big gamble to bypass the current record industry and rely far more on the direct mail lists of jazz fans which the newly formed Creative World label would need to sell records.

Live At Redlands University was recorded live with no inter-cutting or over-dubbing throughout the entire two LP set. Sound engineer Wally Heider was used for the album, renowned in Los Angeles at the time for both his live recording ability and having revolutionized live 24-track recording. The album was mixed and mastered by Andy Richardson at United Western Recorders.

== Reception and influence ==
Professional ratings
Review scores
Source	Rating
Down Beat	5/5 stars
Billboard	(favorable)

Live at Redlands University was released in 1970 on Creative World Records in the United States, in double LP format with a double cover. It has been duly reviewed as a class production as the first of Kenton's Creative World releases. The double LP is an artistic highlight for both Stan Kenton and Creative World Records, it's a live album that breaks ground for the Kenton organization to have greater say in the future direction of the group.

== Track listing ==
No.	Title	Writer(s)	Length
1.	"Here's That Rainy Day"	Jimmy Van Heusen	3:39
2.	"A Little Minor Booze"	Willie Maiden	5:38
3.	"Tico Tico"	Ervin Drake	4:33
4.	"Didn't We?"	Dee Barton	4:45
5.	"Chiapas"	Hank Levy	7:08
6.	"MacArthur Park"	Jimmy Webb	5:26
7.	"The Peanut Vendor"	Moises Simons	4:59
8.	"Bon Homme Richard"	Ken Hanna	4:17
9.	"Hey Jude"	John Lennon and Paul McCartney	8:57
10.	"Tiare"	Ken Hanna	5:13
11.	"Terry Talk"	Willie Maiden	6:53
12.	"Granada"	Augustin Lara	8:01
13.	"Artistry in Rhythm"	Stan Kenton	5:24

== Personnel ==
=== Musicians ===
- piano and leader: Stan Kenton
- saxophones and flutes: Quin Davis, Richard Torres, Norm Smith, Willie Maiden, Jim Timlin
- trumpets: Mike Vax, Jim Kartchner, Dennis Noday, Warren Gale, Joe Ellis
- trombones: Dick Shearer, Mike Jamieson, Fred Carter, Tom Bridges (bass trombone)
- tuba: Graham Ellis
- acoustic and electric bass: Gary Todd
- drum set: John von Ohlen
- percussion: Effrain Lobgreira

=== Production ===
- Dick Shearer – production
- Wally Heider – recording engineering
- Doug Neal – liner notes
- Andy Richardson – mix engineer

== Bibliography ==
- Sparke, Michael (2010). "Stan Kenton: This Is An Orchestra". Denton, TX: University of North Texas Press.
- Sparke, Michael (1998). "Stan Kenton: The Studio Sessions". Lake Geneva, WI: Balboa Books.
- Harris, Steven D. (2000). "The Stan Kenton Kronicles". Pasadena, CA: Dynaflow Publications.
- Cook, Richard (2002). "The Penguin Guide To Jazz On CD (6th Edition)". London, England: Penguin Books.
