= Tony Campise =

- Born: Anthony Sebastian Campise; January 22, 1943; Houston, Texas
- Origin: Houston, Texas
- Died: March 7, 2010 (aged 67) Austin, Texas
- Genre: Jazz
- Occupation: Freelance jazz artist
- Instruments: Saxophones, flutes, clarinets, oboe (Multireedist)
- Years active: 1965–2009
- Formerly of: Stan Kenton Orchestra, Danish Radio Big Band

Anthony Sebastian Campise (January 22, 1943 – March 7, 2010) was an American jazz musician. He primarily played tenor saxophone and flute though he was a multireedist who also used clarinet and oboe. He was known for his exceptional technique and fluid style on all reed instruments; Campise is most recognized for his association with the Stan Kenton Orchestra in the mid-1970s.

== Musical education, style, and first work in Houston ==
Campise was born and raised in Houston, Texas and early on had studied with Hal Tennyson at the age of 13 on alto sax and clarinet. He also studied with the famed Woody Herman jazz sideman Jerry Coker learning improvisation when he was 18, Campise also studied briefly with Lee Konitz. He studied flute and oboe extensively with Byron and Barbara Hester in the 1960s; most notably he studied flute with Julius Baker in New York during the late 1960s in hopes of becoming a classical flutist.

His formal musical education came in his college years while attending Sam Houston State University, the University of Houston, Houston Baptist College, and Monterey Peninsula College during the late 1960s and early 1970s.

Campise's saxophone style was eloquent, warm, and personal on ballads while muscular on up tempo jazz pieces (and sometimes quite frenetic); he was a devotee of the "Texas Tenor" jazz styles of Arnett Cobb and Illinois Jacquet. The more modern and avant-garde influence he demonstrates on the recordings with Stan Kenton show how influenced he was by saxophonist Eric Dolphy. He was a native of Houston, Texas and developed a musical style and career there but eventually settled to Austin, Texas in 1984.

The influences Campise most closely attributed his own style to are jazz artists Charlie Parker, John Coltrane, Lennie Tristano, and Eric Dolphy.

His first notable work as a saxophonist was in Houston working with Don Cannon (1962–65), Paul Schmitt (1967–71), the Gulf Coast Jazz Giants (1970–73) and working with the Houston Musical Theatre as a woodwind doubler for three seasons.

== With Stan Kenton ==
In early 1974 Stan Kenton's lead alto player John Park and altoist Jimmy Ford (who was from Houston and had been with Maynard Ferguson's band) recommended Tony Campise to Stan Kenton to take over for Park. Starting in early 1974 Campise started on the road with the Stan Kenton Orchestra in the lead alto saxophone chair and recorded as a featured soloist the on LPs Stan Kenton Plays Chicago (1974), and Fire, Fury & Fun (1975). As noted by Stan Kenton, Campise was very popular with the public as a featured soloist during that time. Kenton himself is also quoted, "...Campise has such tremendous technique he can't help but use it. He would take a lot of wild chances and scare guys to death, the things he would get going on that horn." Kenton bandmate Dick Shearer probably best sums up Tony Campise's prowess as a world-class musician and jazz soloist, "Campise probably knew more about saxophone than anyone I've ever heard in my life. Technically he knew how to do everything, and he could change styles: if he wanted to sound like Johnny Hodges or Lee Konitz...he could do that very easily."

== Settled in Austin, Texas ==
Tony Campise performed in the jazz clubs in and around 6th Street in Austin, and also backed artists such as Frank Sinatra, The Manhattan Transfer, and Sarah Vaughan starting in 1984 where he finally settled. He recorded five albums in the 1990s; his 1991 album Once in a Blue Moon was nominated for a Grammy in the jazz category. During this time he was a featured artist at venues such as the Newport Jazz Festival

Campise died after suffering a brain hemorrhage. He had never fully recovered from an October 2009 fall outside a Corpus Christi, Texas hotel, when he hit the back of his head. The urn containing his remains is currently displayed in a prominent glass case at the top of the stage pillar in Austin's Elephant Room jazz club, where he frequently performed as a musician. Above the urn is painted in large black letters on white background: "THE REMAINS OF TONY CAMPISE", a play on one of his common self-introductions: "...and I am the remains of Tony Campise".

== Discography ==
- Tony Campise (Ram/American Record Co., 1980)
- Picture This (American Record Co., 1980)
- First Takes (Heart, 1990)
- Once in a Blue Moon (Heart, 1991)
- Ballads, Blues & Bebop (Heart, 1993)
- Ballads, Blues, Bebop & Beyond (Heart, 1994)
- Strange Beauty (Heart, 1995)
