= 7.5 on the Richter Scale =

Studio album by Stan Kenton Orchestra
- Released: 1973
- Recorded: August 17–18, 1973
- Studio: Studio 4, Wally Heider Recording, Hollywood, California
- Genre: Jazz
- Length: 33:43
- Label: Creative World, GNP Crescendo
- Producer: Bob Curnow

Stan Kenton Orchestra chronology
National Anthems of the World (1972)	7.5 on the Richter Scale (1973)	Stan Kenton Without His Orchestra (1973)

7.5 on the Richter Scale is an album by American jazz musician Stan Kenton and his Orchestra that was released in 1973. Recording sessions for the album took place during August 1973 in Hollywood, California.

== Background ==
Until 7.5 on the Richter Scale the band had primarily made swing recordings with progressive leanings. The 1969 Capitol release of Stan Kenton: The Music of Hair was the only other time since 1943 that Kenton moved away from his style. He had no involvement in the Hair album except for his name appearing on the jacket cover. Ralph Carmichael and Lennie Niehaus were in charge. Producer Lee Gillette at Capitol was trying to take advantage of the popularity of the musical. Due to lack of promotion, the album was a commercial failure, and this was Kenton's last album for Capitol.

In 1970 Kenton moved to his label, Creative World Records, when the music industry was changing. He turned to arrangers Hank Levy and Bob Curnow to write material that appealed to a younger audience. The first albums released by Creative World were concerts by Kenton. He controlled the content, but he lacked the resources to engineer and produce what Capitol had paid for in the past. He gambled that he could rely on direct mail to jazz fans to sell albums. During 1973 Kenton wanted to change the band drastically. He told Gene Roland to come up with a rock-oriented album that would retain the Kenton sound. By June 1973 Curnow had become artists and repertoire manager overseeing Creative World, and he produced the album. Much of the music Roland produced fell short of his previous work. Other writers were called for help.

"We (did) 7.5 On the Richter Scale with some pretty wild things on there, including my chart of Paul McCartney's "Live and Let Die".

== Track listing ==
No.	Title	Writer(s)	Length
1.	"Live and Let Die"	Paul McCartney	3:45
2.	"Body and Soul"	Johnny Green	4:45
3.	"Down and Dirty"	Hank Levy	5:35
4.	"Country Cousin"	Gene Roland	3:06
5.	"2002-Zarathustrevisited"	Richard Strauss	6:06
6.	"It's Not Easy Bein' Green"	Joe Raposo	3:41
7.	"Love Theme from The Godfather"	Nino Rota	3:13
8.	"Blue Gene"	Gene Roland	3:47

== Personnel ==
- Stan Kenton – piano
- Paul Adamson – trumpet
- Mike Barrowman – trumpet
- Dennis Noday – trumpet
- Gary Pack – trumpet
- Jay Saunders – trumpet
- Mike Snustead – trumpet
- Dale Devoe – trombone
- Bill Hartman – trombone
- Dick Shearer – trombone
- Lloyd Spoon – trombone
- Mike Wallace – trombone, tuba
- Mary Fettig – saxophone
- John Park – saxophone
- Kim Park – saxophone
- Roy Reynolds – saxophone
- Richard Torres – saxophone
- Kerby Stewart – double bass, bass guitar
- Peter Erskine – drums
- Ramon Lopez – percussion
