= Omnibook =

Omnibook may refer to:

- Omnibook (magazine), a publication offering abridgements of best-selling books
- Charlie Parker Omnibook, a collection of Charlie Parker transcriptions
- HP Omnibook, a line of laptop computers by Hewlett Packard
