= Hair (Stan Kenton album) =

Studio album by Stan Kenton
- Released: 1969
- Recorded: June 6 & 11–14, 1969
- Studio: Capitol (Hollywood)
- Genre: Jazz
- Label: Capitol ST 305
- Producer: Lee Gillette

Stan Kenton chronology
Finian's Rainbow (1968)	Hair (1969)	Live at Redlands University (1970)

Hair is an album by bandleader Stan Kenton featuring big band versions of tunes from the rock musical Hair recorded in 1969 for Capitol Records. It was his final record for the label, marking the end of a 25-year association.

== Track listing ==
All compositions by Galt MacDermot, James Rado and Gerome Ragni.

1. "Aquarius" - 3:00
2. "Walking in Space" - 3:57
3. "Frank Mills" - 2:10
4. "I Got Life" - 2:15
5. "Colored Spade" - 4:07
6. "Where Do I Go?" - 2:48
7. "Sodomy" - 4:41
8. "Hare Krishna (Be In)" - 3:05
9. "Easy to Be Hard" - 3:10
10. "Good Morning Starshine" - 2:45

== Personnel ==
- Stan Kenton - piano, conductor
- John Audino, Bud Brisbois, Ollie Mitchell, Ray Triscari - trumpet, flugelhorn
- Rob Hicks, Jim Kartchner - trumpet
- Jack Sheldon - flugelhorn
- Gil Falco, Dick Nash, Dick Shearer, Tommy Shepard - trombone
- Graham Ellis, Morris Repass, George Roberts - bass trombone
- Sam Most, Bud Shank - alto saxophone, flute, piccolo
- Bob Cooper - tenor saxophone, flute
- Jim Horn - tenor saxophone, flute, piccolo
- Gene Cipriano - tenor saxophone, flute, piccolo, oboe
- Jack Nimitz - baritone saxophone, bass saxophone, tenor saxophone, flute, clarinet
- Bob Hood - tenor saxophone, flute, baritone saxophone, clarinet, piccolo
- Clark Gassman - piano, harpsichord, ondioline
- Ralph Grierson - harpsichord, ondioline
- Dennis Budimir - guitar
- Mike Deasy - guitar, banjo, mandolin, sitar
- Chuck Domanico - bass, electric bass
- Paul Humphrey - drums
- Emil Richards - vibraphone, Latin percussion
- Dale Anderson, Victor Feldman, Adolpho "Chino" Valdez - Latin percussion
- Jacqueline Allan, Billie Barnum, Dick Castle, Wayne Dunstan, Loren Farber, Ronald Hicklin, Jimmy Joyce, Diana Lee, Jay Meyer, Julia Tillman, Carolyn Willis, Edna Wright - chorus
- Ralph Carmichael - arranger
