= Dr. Um =

Studio album by Peter Erskine
- Released: 2016
- Genre: Jazz
- Label: Fuzzy Music

Peter Erskine chronology
Music for Moderns (2005)	Dr. Um (2016)	Side Man Blue (2016)

Dr. Um is an album by Peter Erskine. It earned Erskine a Grammy Award nomination for Best Jazz Instrumental Album.
