= We're Back! (album) =

Studio album by California State University, Los Angeles Jazz Ensemble
- Released: 1986
- Recorded: Sage and Sound Recording; Hollywood, California
- Genre: Jazz, Big band, instrumental
- Length: 40:05
- Label: H D C Music Publications
- Producer: David Caffey

California State University, Los Angeles Jazz Ensemble chronology
The New In You (1985)	We're Back! (1986)	Diversions (1987)
- cat. # CSULA 886

Audio sample
- "At Arm's Length": file; help

We're Back! is a 1986 album (LP Vinyl) released by the California State University, Los Angeles Jazz Ensemble, it was the springboard for the Bob Curnow's arrangement of the Pat Metheny work The First Circle. The group proved to be one of the finest college jazz orchestras of that era with having placed in the finals of the Pacific Coast Collegiate Jazz Festival. The jazz band had numerous student musicians that have made a name for themselves as professionals to include Sharon Hirata, Luis Bonilla, Phil Feather, Jack Cooper, Charlie Richard, Eric "Bobo" Correa, Mark Gutierrez, Vince Dublino, and José Arellano.

== Background ==
In 1984 and 1985 the California State University, Los Angeles Music Department and CSULA Associated Students decided to fund LP recordings of the jazz ensemble to better serve as a teaching tool for student music, jazz groups. We're Back! is the second of six albums to come from CSULA during the 1980s featuring the award-winning CSULA #1 Jazz Ensemble. The LP contains tracks from the #1 CSULA Jazz Ensemble to include compositions of three students and from the two directors (professors David Caffey and Bob Curnow).

The qualities of the LP that set it apart from numerous university jazz records of that era is the fact it was entirely written and composed by the students and faculty of CSULA at such a high level. There is a consistent tradition of musicians coming from the CSULA program who have worked with major musical acts, on major studio and movie projects, and hold positions in higher education in music. The roster on this album is self-evident as to the diversity and level of student musicians CSULA developed at that time and has for many years dating far back to musicians (graduates) such as Lennie Niehaus and Gabe Baltazar.

== Track listing ==
All tracks are written by various artists listed.

No.	Title	Length
1.	"Blizzard Bop (David Caffey)"	4:06
2.	"Elegy (David Caffey)"	5:25
3.	"The First Circle (Pat Metheny, arr. Bob Curnow)"	8:31
4.	"Cuidado! (Mark Guitierrez)"	6:45
5.	"Commuter Blues (Charles Richard)"	4:35
6.	"At Arm's Length (Jack Cooper)"	4:00
7.	"On Your Toes (Mark Guitierrez)"	6:43
Total length:		40:05

== Recording Sessions ==
- Recorded: May 10, 17, and 23, 1986, Sage and Sound Recording, Hollywood, California
- Mixing: June 23, 25, 26, 1986, Sage and Sound Recording, Hollywood, California

== Personnel ==
=== Musicians ===
- Conductor: David Caffey
- Saxes and woodwinds: Charlie Richard, Sharon Hirata, Phil Feather, Jack Cooper, Scott Ackerman
- Trumpets and flugelhorns: Tim Neff, Barry Parr, Ken Montgomery, David Leon, Jim Bynum
- Trombones: Gary Smith, Luis Bonilla, Tom Griffith, John Sandhagen, Brent Decker
- Guitar and Piano: Mark Gutierrez
- Vibraphone and marimba: Cory Estrada
- Bass: José Arellano
- Drums: Vince Dublino
- Percussion: Eric "Bobo" Correa

=== Production ===
- Recording engineers: Jim Mooney and Jerry Wood
- Mixing engineers: Jim Mooney and David Caffey
- Mastering: K Disc
- Cover art: Randy Piland
