= Swingrass '83 =

1983 swing/prog-bluegrass album

Studio album by Various Artists
- Released: 1983
- Recorded: January 3, 1982
- Studios: Studio 55, Hollywood, California
- Genres: Swing, progressive bluegrass
- Labels: Antilles, Mango
- Producer: Buell Neidlinger

Swingrass '83 is a 1983 swing/prog-bluegrass album featuring Andy Statman, Richard Greene, Marty Krystall, Peter Ivers, Fred Tackett, Peter Erskine and Buell Neidlinger. The same musicians, minus Fred Tackett, had previously recorded an album under the name Buellgrass (Big Day At Ojai, also released in 1983, reissued on CD in 1996 under the title Across The Tracks).

The album consists of renditions of three songs apiece by Duke Ellington and Thelonious Monk, plus a couple of group originals.

Not yet issued on CD, the album was originally issued in 1983 on Antilles Records and reissued in 1990 on Mango Records.

== Track listing ==
1. "Mainstem" (Duke Ellington)
2. "Subtle Sleuth" (Ellington)
3. "Sophisticated Lady" (Ellington)
4. "Skippy" (Thelonious Monk)
5. "Bllue Buell" (Buell Neidlinger)
6. "Little Rootie Tootie" (Monk)
7. "Friday The 13th" (Monk)
8. "Alpha Centauri" (Peter Ivers)

== Reception ==
Professional ratings
Review scores
Source	Rating
Allmusic	4.5/5 stars
Robert Christgau	A−

The album has been well received by music critics. Scott Yanow said that the "unusual mixture of players" delivered "a memorable set". Robert Christgau of The Village Voice called the album the "left-field instrumental of the year".

== Releases ==
- Antilles Records - 1983 LP
- Mango Records- 1990 LP
