= Journey Into Capricorn =

Studio album by Stan Kenton Orchestra
- Released: 1976
- Recorded: August 16–18, 1976
- Studio: United Western Recorders, Hollywood, California
- Genre: Jazz, jazz fusion
- Length: 33:43
- Label: Creative World Records, GNP Crescendo
- Producer: Robert Curnow

Stan Kenton Orchestra chronology
Kenton '76 (1976)	Journey Into Capricorn (1976)	Kenton Live In Europe (1976)

Journey into Capricorn is the last studio album by American jazz musician Stan Kenton and his orchestra, released in late 1976, by Creative World Records. Recording sessions for the album took place in Hollywood, California on August 16–18, 1976. The initial release of the album titled both the album and the individual tune Journey to Capricorn. The later release reworked the cover art and corrected both titles to JOURNEY INTO CAPRICORN.

== Background ==
Though written by Mark Taylor, Granada Smoothie is very reminiscent of Hank Levy's compositions. Taylor's well thought out arrangement of Too Shy To Say is a clever transformation of Stevie Wonder's pop music hit, the chart represents a continued push to keep Kenton's musical direction moving forward.

During the sessions two compositions were recorded but never got issued on the release: Ken Hanna's "Sensitivo" and Alan Yankee's arrangement of "Lush Life". Producer Bob Curnow, "I have an uneasy feeling that the takes were not really the best on any of their unreleased material, but still it would be nice to have them out after all these years." Curnow is unclear who now possesses the unissued Creative World masters; whether the masters were part of the deal with Gene Norman or if they are in possession of the Kenton estate.

== Reception ==
Professional ratings
Review scores
Source	Rating
Down Beat	4/5 stars
All Music Guide	(favorable)

== Track listing ==
No.	Title	Writer(s)	Length
1.	"Too Shy To Say"	Stevie Wonder	5:04
2.	"Pegasus"	Hank Levy	4:50
3.	"Granada Smoothie"	Mark Taylor	4:32
4.	"90 Degrees Celsius"	Hank Levy	6:12
5.	"Journey Into Capricorn"	Hank Levy	6:53
6.	"Celebration Suite"	Chick Corea	12:00

Too Shy To Say arranged by Mark Taylor and Celebration Suite arranged by Alan Yankee.

== Personnel ==
=== Musicians ===
- piano and leader: Stan Kenton
- saxophones and flutes: Alan Yankee, Bill Fritz (track: 6), Dave Sova, Greg Metcalf, Roy Reynolds, Terry Layne
- trumpets: Dave Kennedy, Jay Sollenberger, Joe Casano, Steve Campos, Tim Hagans
- trombones: Allan Morrissey, Dick Shearer, Jeff Uusitalo, Mike Egan, Doug Purviance (bass trombone)
- tuba: Mike Wallace
- acoustic and electric bass: John Worster
- drum set: Gary Hobbs
- percussion: Ramon Lopez

=== Production ===
- Bob Curnow, Bill Putnam, Stan Kenton – production
- Jerry Barnes – recording engineering
- Jordana Von Spiro – art direction
- Dennis Millard – cover art
- Gene Lees – liner notes
- Jerry Barnes – mix engineer

== Bibliography ==
- Dexter, David (January 15, 1977). "Closeup". Billboard.
- Sparke, Michael (2010). Stan Kenton: This Is An Orchestra. Denton, TX: University of North Texas Press. pp. 273–75.
- Sparke, Michael (1998). Stan Kenton: The Studio Sessions. Lake Geneva, WI: Balboa Books. pp. 216ff.
