= Stan Kenton Band Clinics =

American summer jazz music program

Stan Kenton Band Clinics were summer programs founded by Stan Kenton in 1959. Kenton conceived the idea out of concern that education of jazz and all its forms were not reaching teenagers who showed signs of interest in it. He strongly felt that the survival of jazz depended heavily on the ability of leaders and artists in the jazz community to educate a younger generation.

== Development of the Clinics ==
The first clinic was in 1959, held at Indiana University under the auspices of the National Stage Band Camp. Struck by the serious responsibility and encouraged by his first camp, Kenton, in 1960, sent a trunk load of original big band scores culled from his library to North Texas for use as teaching aids. We definitely have a serious responsibility that must be dealt with.

In 1967, Kenton separated his activities from the National Stage Band Camp, renaming it the Stan Kenton Band Clinics. The first clinics (the word camp was abandoned as being not academic enough) were held at University of Redlands and San Jose State University with faculty that included Henry Mancini, Shelly Manne, Pete Rugolo, Bill Holman, Bill Perkins and Bud Shank. In the 1970s Hank Levy, Ken Hanna, Lou Marini, Tom Ferguson and Dan Haerle were among the faculty.

== See also ==
- Stan Kenton
- Jazz education
