= Rit's House =

Studio album by Lee Ritenour
- Released: August 2002
- Recorded: 2002
- Studio: Sunset Sound Studios (Hollywood, CA) Starlight Studios (Los Angeles, CA)
- Genre: Jazz
- Length: 62:09
- Label: GRP Records
- Producer: Lee Ritenour

Lee Ritenour chronology
A Twist of Marley (2001)	Rit's House (2002)	The Very Best of Lee Ritenour (2003)

Rit's House is an album by American guitarist Lee Ritenour released in 2002, and recorded for the GRP label. AllMusic praised Rit's House as "among his more memorable and substantial efforts". The album reached No. 4 on the Billboard jazz albums chart.

== Track listing ==
1. Module 105 (Lee Ritenour) - 5:23
2. "13" (Gary McFarland) - 5:01
3. Mizrab (Gabor Szabo) - 5:26
4. 78th and 3rd (Lee Ritenour) - 5:38
5. Rit's House (Lee Ritenour) - 5:05
6. A Little Dolphin Dreamin' (Lee Ritenour) - 5:14
7. Every Little Thing She Does Is Magic (Sting) - 4:02
8. Condor (Dave Grusin) - 5:14
9. Olinda (Lee Ritenour) - 5:11
10. Night Owl (Lee Ritenour / Mitch Holder) - 6:24
11. Party Time (Lee Morgan) - 4:19
12. Just Listen (Lee Ritenour) - 6:00

== Personnel ==
- Lee Ritenour – guitars, arrangements
- George Duke – Fender Rhodes (1, 3)
- Randy Kerber – synthesizers (1, 6, 9), strings (1)
- Jochem van der Saag – sound design (1, 3, 7, 8), loops (1), percussion (3), keyboards (7), samples (7), arrangements (7, 8), synthesizers (8)
- John Beasley – Fender Rhodes (2, 5, 7, 8), Hammond B3 organ (6, 9), acoustic piano (6)
- Joey DeFrancesco – Hammond B3 organ (4)
- Mark Stephens – Hammond B3 organ (5)
- Alan Pasqua – Hammond B3 organ (10), acoustic piano (11, 12)
- Mitch Holder – acoustic guitar (9), arrangements (10)
- Marcus Miller – bass (1, 3)
- Dave Carpenter – acoustic bass (2, 7, 10–12)
- Melvin Lee Davis – bass (5, 6, 8, 9)
- Vinnie Colaiuta – drums (1, 3, 5, 8, 9)
- Will Kennedy – drums (2, 6, 7)
- Byron Landham – drums (4)
- Peter Erskine – drums (10–12)
- Paulinho da Costa – percussion (1, 2, 5–9)
- Dan Higgins – flute (1), tenor saxophone (2, 4, 5), alto flute (2), Indian flutes (9)
- Ernie Watts – tenor saxophone (6, 8, 10, 11)
- Bill Reichenbach Jr. – trombone (2, 4, 5)
- Jerry Hey – flugelhorn (1), trumpet (2, 4, 5, 11), horn arrangements (2, 5), synthesizer arrangements (6, 9)
- Gary Grant – trumpet (2, 4, 5)
- Michael McDonald – lead and backing vocals (7)

=== Production ===
- Lee Ritenour – producer
- Don Murray – recording, mixing
- Eric Ferguson – additional engineer, Pro Tools engineer
- Kevin Dean – assistant engineer
- Chris Reynolds – assistant engineer
- Doug Sax – mastering at The Mastering Lab (Hollywood, California)
- Sharlene Bazeghi – production coordinator
- Kelly Pratt – release coordinator
- Robert Silverberg – release coordinator
- Hollis King – art direction
- Gravillis Inc. – graphic design
- Beth Herzhaft – photography
- David K – stylist
- Mark Wexler – management

== Charts ==
Chart (2002)	Peak position
Billboard Jazz Albums	4
