= Tim Hagans =

American jazz trumpeter, arranger, and composer

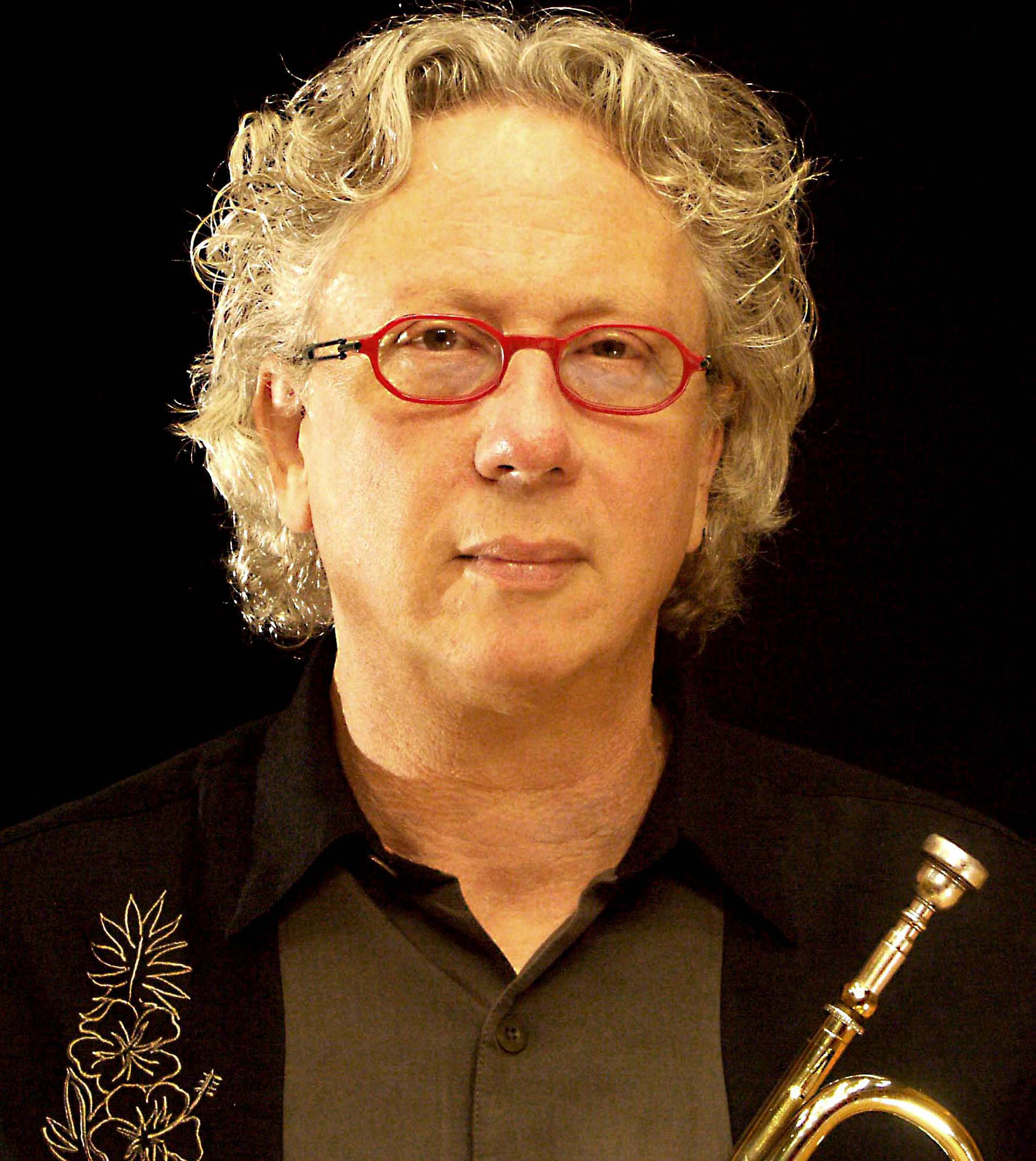

Background information
- Born: August 19, 1954 (age 72); Dayton, Ohio, U.S.
- Genre: Jazz
- Occupation: Musician
- Instrument: Trumpet
- Years active: 1970–present
- Labels: Blue Note, Palmetto
- Website: TimHagans.com

Tim Hagans (born August 19, 1954) is an American jazz trumpeter, arranger, and composer. He has been nominated for three Grammy Awards: Best Instrumental Composition for "Box of Cannoli" on The Avatar Sessions (Fuzzy Music, 2010); Best Contemporary Jazz Album for Animation*Imagination (Blue Note, 1999); and Best Contemporary Jazz Album for Re-Animation (Blue Note, 2000).

== Career ==
Hagans was born and grew up in Dayton, Ohio, United States. His early inspirations included Miles Davis, Freddie Hubbard, and Thad Jones, to whom he dedicated For the Music Suite, a 40-minute piece for jazz orchestra composed on a grant from the National Endowment for the Arts. In 1974, Hagans joined the Stan Kenton band, with whom he played until 1977, when he toured with Woody Herman. He then left for Europe, where he lived in Malmö, Sweden, a hotbed of the European jazz scene. While in Europe, he toured extensively and played with Dexter Gordon, Kenny Drew, Horace Parlan, and Thad Jones. His first recorded composition, "I Hope This Time Isn't the Last," appears on the album Thad Jones Live at Slukefter (Metronome, 1980).

In 1987, he moved to New York City. He has performed with Maria Schneider, Yellowjackets, Steps Ahead, Secret Society, and Gary Peacock. Hagans has worked extensively with producer and saxophonist Bob Belden on a variety of recordings and live performances, including their ongoing Animation/Imagination project. Festivals at which he has performed include the Mount Fuji Festival in Japan, the Montreal Jazz Festival, the Berlin Jazz Tage, and the Montreux Jazz Festival in Switzerland.

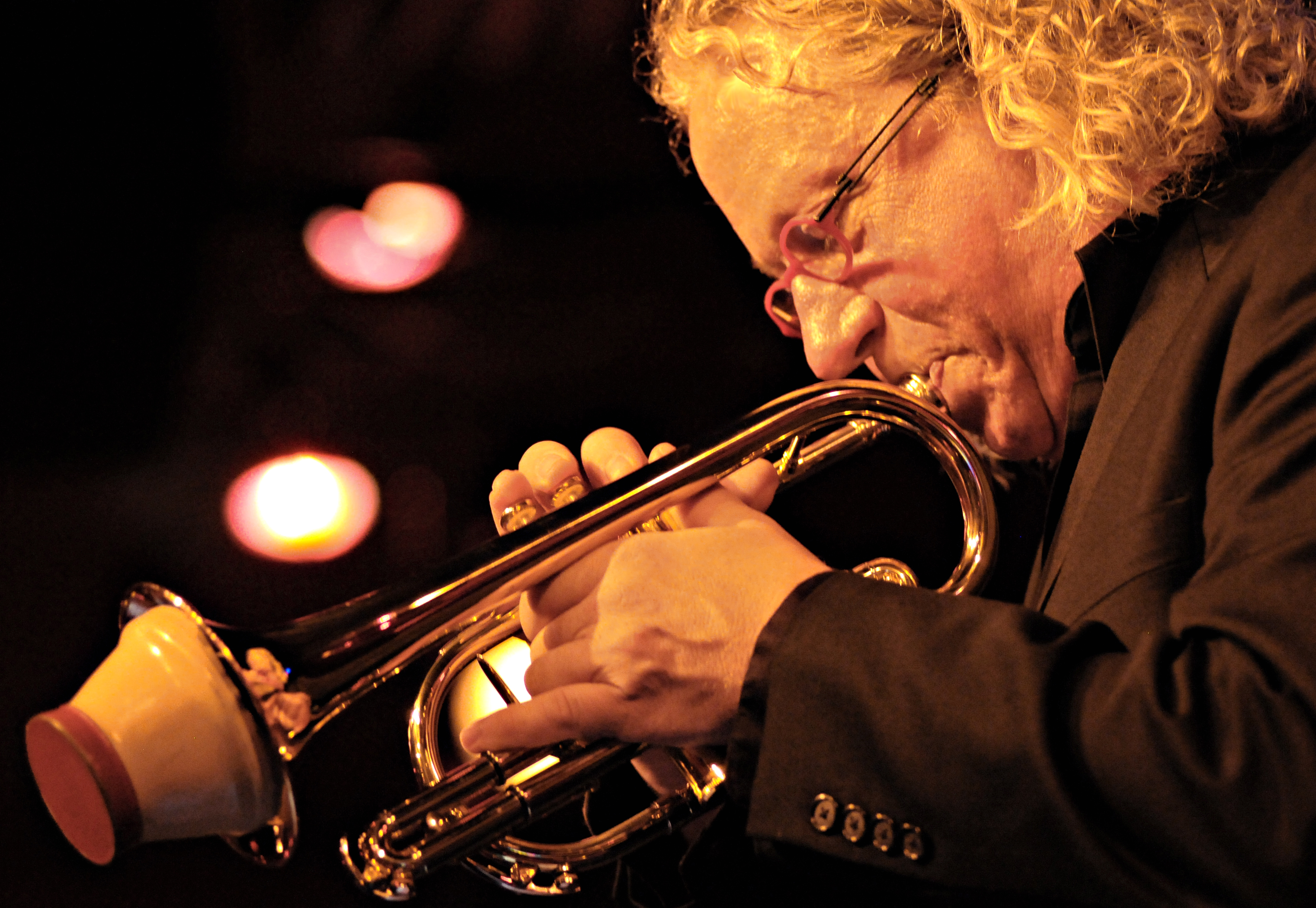
Tim Hagans at Birdland

Hagans has taught master classes at universities throughout the world.

He taught at the University of Cincinnati from 1982 to 1984 and at Berklee College of Music from 1984 to 1987. From 1996 to 2010, he was Artistic Director and Composer-in-Residence for the Norrbotten Big Band located in Luleå, Sweden. The Norrbotten Big Band is a 17-piece jazz orchestra for whom Hagans wrote and arranged original compositions, with guest artists including Randy Brecker, Joe Lovano, Dave Liebman, Peter Erskine, and Rufus Reid, an enterprise culminating in the Grammy Award nominated album, The Avatar Sessions: The Music of Tim Hagans, for which the Norbotten Big Band traveled to New York. His compositions are featured on numerous recordings with the Norrbotten Big Band, including Future North (Double-Time, 1998), Future Miles (ACT, 2002), and Worth the Wait (Fuzzy Music, 2007).

Hagans has been commissioned by several other European jazz orchestras, including the NDR Big Band in Hamburg, UMO in Helsinki, and he was Composer-in-Residence at the Jazz Baltica Festival in 2000. In 2008, he was awarded the ASCAP/IAJE Established Composer Award, and in 2009 he was commissioned by the Barents Composers Orchestra to write a piece for strings, woodwinds, and percussion: Daytonality, a piece based on improvisational melodic language.

Hagans is the subject of the feature documentary Boogaloo Road, directed by Runar Enberg and Marianne Soderberg. He is a featured soloist on Howard Shore's soundtrack for the feature film The Score starring Marlon Brando, Edward Norton, and Robert De Niro.

Following his interest in exploring theatrical venues for innovative jazz, he is Composer-in-Residence with the Michele Brangwen Dance Ensemble, a dance company located in Houston, Texas, and in New York City. In January 2012, his composition Outside My Window was performed with the MBDE at Dance Theatre of Harlem. He also performs with author-actor Peter Josyph in duets consisting of haiku texts and freely improvised trumpet, including Josyph's the way of the trumpet, a haiku novel written for and dedicated to Hagans.

In June 2012, Hagans was awarded an honorary doctorate from the Sibelius Academy in Helsinki.

== Discography ==
=== As leader/co-leader ===
- From the Neck Down (MoPro, 1983)
- No Words (Blue Note, 1993)
- Audible Architecture (1994)
- Hub Songs – the Music of Freddie Hubbard (1998)
- Between the Lines with Marc Copland (SteepleChase, 2000)
- Future Miles (ACT, 2002)
- Beautiful Lily (Pirouet, 2006)
- Alone Together (Pirouet, 2008)
- The Avatar Sessions (2010)
- The Moon is Waiting (Palmetto, 2011)

Co-leader with Bob Belden: Animation

- Re-Animation Live! (Blue Note, 1999)
- Animation – Imagination (Blue Note, 1999)
- Agemo (RareNoise, 2011)
- Asiento (RareNoise, 2011)
- Transparent Heart (RareNoise, 2012)
- Machine Language (RareNoise, 2015)

Collaborations

- Kenny Burrell, Ron Carter, Tim Hagans, Craig Handy, Cedar Walton, Lenny White Primal Blue (Hip Bop Essence, 1995)
- Peter Erskine, Tim Hagans & The Norrbotten Big Band Worth the Wait (Fuzzy Music, 2007)

=== As a member ===
Blue Wisp Big Band

- Butterfly (Mopro, 1982)
- The Smooth One (Mopro, 1983)
- Live at Carmelo's (Mopro, 1984) – live
- Rollin' with Von Ohlen (Mopro, 1985)

=== As sideman ===
With Bob Belden

- Treasure Island (Sunnyside, 1990)
- Straight to My Heart: The Music of Sting (Blue Note, 1991)
- When the Doves Cry: The Music of Prince (Blue Note, 1994)
- Bob Beldon Presents Strawberry Fields (Blue Note, 1996)
- Shades of Blue (Blue Note, 1996)
- Tapestry (Blue Note, 1997)
- Black Dahlia (Blue Note, 2001)

With Marc Copland

- Softly... (Savoy Jazz, 1998)
- Between the Lines (SteepleChase, 2000)

With John Fedchock

- New York Big Band (Reservoir, 1995)
- On the Edge (Reservoir, 1997)

With Jon Gordon

- 1994: Ask Me Now (Criss Cross, 1995)
- 1995: Witness (Criss Cross, 1996)

With Vic Juris

- For the Music (Jazzpoint, 1992)
- Music of Alec Wilder (Double-Time, 1996)

With Stan Kenton

- Fire Fury & Fun (Creative World, 1974)
- Journey Into Capricorn (Creative World, 1976)
- Kenton '76 (Creative World, 1976)
- Kenton Live in Europe (Decca, 1977) – live
- Street of Dreams (Creative World, 1979) – compilation

With Andy LaVerne

- Severe Clear (SteepleChase, 1990)
- Serenade to Silver (SteepleChase, 1996)

With Joe Lovano

- Worlds (Label Bleu, 1989)
- Universal Language (Blue Note, 1992)
- 52nd Street Themes (Blue Note, 2000)
- Streams of Expression (Blue Note, 2006)

With Mark Masters

- The Clifford Brown Project (Capri, 2003)
- Porgy and Bess: Redefined (Capri, 2005)
- Wish Me Well (Capri, 2006)
- Farewell Walter Dewey Redman (Capri, 2008)

With Ron McClure

- Sunburst (SteepleChase, 1992)
- Concrete Canyon (SteepleChase, 1996)
- Double Triangle (Naxos Jazz, 1999)

With Bob Mintzer

- Departure (DMP, 1991)
- Only in New York (DMP, 1994)
- The First Decade (DMP, 1995)

With Maria Schneider

- 1992: Evanescence (Enja, 1994)
- 1995: Coming About (Enja, 1996)

With Bert Seager

- Time to Burn (Antilles, 1986)
- Because They Can (Antilles, 1987)

With Steve Slagle

- The Steve Slagle Quartet (SteepleChase, 1993)
- Spread the Word (SteepleChase, 1995)

With Ernie Wilkins

- 1980: Ernie Wilkins & the Almost Big Band (Storyville, 1981)
- 1981: Almost Big Band Live! At Slukefter Jazz Club In Tivoli Gardens Copenhagen (Matrix, 1982) – live
- 1981: Live! At the Slukefter Jazz Club (Matrix, 1982) – live

With others

- Thad Jones, Thad Jones Eclipse (Metronome, 1980)
- Orange Then Blue, Music for Jazz Orchestra (GM Recordings, 1987)
- Judi Silvano, Dancing Voices (JSL, 1992)
- Yellowjackets, Like a River (GRP, 1993)
- George Gruntz, Beyond Another Wall: Live in China (TCB, 1994)
- Kenny Werner, Gu-Ru (TCB, 1994)
- Steve Rochinski, Until Further Notice... (LineOut Music, 1994)
- Jay Anderson, Local Color (DMP, 1994)
- Steps Ahead, Vibe (NYC, 1995)
- Dee Carstensen, Regarding the Soul (Exit Nine, 1995)
- Helen Schneider, Right as the Rain (Tomato, 1995)
- Joey Calderazzo, Secrets (AudioQuest Music, 1995)
- Jarmo Savolainen, True Image (A-, 1995)
- Roseanna Vitro, Passion Dance (Telarc, 1996)
- Don Braden, The Open Road (Double-Time, 1996)
- Seamus Blake, Four Track Mind (Criss Cross, 1997)
- Greg Osby, Further Ado (Blue Note, 1997)
- Jim Snidero, San Juan (Red, 1997)
- Gordon Brisker, The Gift (Naxos Jazz, 1997)
- Charles Pillow, Currents (A-, 1997)
- Nils Landgren, 5000 Miles (ACT, 1999)
- Don Sebesky, Joyful Noise: A Tribute to Duke Ellington (RCA Victor, 1999)
- Hal Galper, Let's Call This That (Double-Time, 1999)
- Jim Nolet, Syzygy (Cathexis, 1999)
- Rodney Jones, The Undiscovered Few (Blue Note, 1999)
- Mark Soskin, 17 (Seventeen) (TCB, 2001)
- Conrad Herwig, Land of Shadow (Criss Cross, 2002)
- Charles Blenzig, It's About Time (Double-Time, 2003)
- Grachan Moncur III, Exploration (Capri, 2004)
- Scott Kinsey, Kinesthetics (Abstract Logix, 2006)
- Dave Lisik Orchestra, Coming Through Slaughter: The Bolden Legend (SkyDeck Music, 2009)
- Magos Herrera, México Azul (Sony Music, 2010)
- Jon Irabagon, Dr. Quixotic's Traveling Exotics (Irabbagast, 2018)
