= Stan Kenton Plays Chicago =

Studio album by Stan Kenton Orchestra
- Released: August 17, 1974
- Recorded: June 4–6, 1974
- Studio: Universal Recording Corp. (Chicago)
- Genre: Jazz, Big band, Fusion jazz
- Length: 33:43
- Label: Creative World Records, GNP Crescendo
- Producer: Robert Curnow

Stan Kenton Orchestra chronology
Solo: Stan Kenton Without His Orchestra (1973)	Stan Kenton Plays Chicago (1974)	Fire, Fury and Fun (1974)

Stan Kenton Plays Chicago is a studio album by American jazz musician Stan Kenton and his orchestra, released on August 17, 1974, by Creative World Records. Recording sessions for the album took place at Universal Recording Corp. in Chicago on June 4, 5, 6, 1974. The sessions are entirely based on the music of modern rock n' roll groups, in contrast to Kenton's earlier work which primarily featured swing with some progressive jazz leanings.

The album's influence on future large ensemble jazz composition and arranging has led more recent critiques to acknowledge it as the most influential album of the later Kenton orchestras and of the 1970s. The album is a class production, and musically the most successful of all the attempts to interpret the Kenton style in contemporary terms.

== Background ==
Up to the time of Stan Kenton Plays Chicago the band had primarily made recordings of music that were swing oriented with progressive leanings. The 1969 Capitol release of Stan Kenton: the music of 'HAIR' was the only other time Stan Kenton had an entire LP move beyond a style and genre which the Kenton 'brand name' had been built on since 1943. He had no involvement in the Hair LP except for Kenton's name placed on the jacket cover; Ralph Carmichael and Lennie Niehaus were placed in charge of the project. Capitol producer Lee Gillette was trying to exploit the money making possibilities of the popular 1968 musical featuring contemporary rock music. Due to lack of promotion by Capitol, the LP was a financial failure; this would be the last release for Kenton under he aegis of Capitol.

The transition from Capitol to Creative World Records in 1970 was fraught with difficulties during a time when the music business was changing rapidly. As a viable jazz artist who was trying to keep a loyal but dwindling following, Kenton turned to arrangers such as Hank Levy and Bob Curnow to write material that appealed to a younger audience. The first releases for the Creative World label were live concerts and Kenton had the control he wanted over content but lacked substantial resources to engineer, mix, and promote what Capitol underwrote in the past. Kenton would take a big gamble to bypass the current record industry and rely far more on the direct mail lists of jazz fans which the newly formed Creative World label would need to sell records.

In June 1973 Curnow had started as the new artists and repertoire manager overseeing the whole operation of the Creative World Records. It was just the year before (in 1972) the Kenton orchestra recorded the National Anthems of the World double LP with 40 arrangements all done by Curnow. As per Curnow himself, "That was a remarkable and very difficult time for me. I was managing (Stan's) record company with NO experience in business, writing music like mad, living in a new place and culture (Los Angeles was another world), traveling a LOT (out with the band at least 1 week a month) and trying to keep it together at home."

"The music (from the Chicago LP) represented something different for Stan's image," said Curnow. "We had just done 7.5 On the Richter Scale with some pretty wild things on there, including my chart of Paul McCartney's Live and Let Die. It was a very successful album, so we decided to follow it up with the music of Chicago." With the success of 7.5 On the Richter Scale and the waters tested with more contemporary material on more than half the LP, a path had been paved to create a recording that was entirely centered on a contemporary rock band.

The Stan Kenton Plays Chicago album was conceived, arranged, conducted, mixed and sequenced by Robert Curnow. He designed the LP cover, created the layout, chose the pictures and wrote some of the liner notes (Long time Kenton assistant Audree Coke did most of the writing for the liner notes on the jacket). It was first supposed to be a tribute album to Chicago and Blood, Sweat & Tears, at the last minute before the recording dates Kenton changed the idea on what the album would be; he wanted original material included. On very short notice Curnow re-wrote/arranged First Child and composed The Rise & Fall of a Short Fugue (Kenton came up came up with the title for the later during the recording of the LP). The band itself had very little time to prepare the music for the sessions, but that was the norm for many recording sessions done by a road band such as the Kenton orchestra.

== Recording ==
Bob (Curnow) was the best at melding rock and Kenton. He squeezed the music into the Kenton mold, writing great arrangements, let's say 85% Kenton and 15% rock, that worked.

— Mike Suter

Stan Kenton Plays Chicago was recorded with no inter-cutting or over-dubbing throughout the entire Chicago LP; the sessions were recorded using a new process called DBX noise reduction. The sessions were over a three-day period at Universal Studios in Chicago. On June 4 the tracks for the Chicago III Suite were put on tape: "Canon" (take 11 was used), "Mother" (take 2 was used), "Once Upon A Time" (take 4 was used) and "Free" (take 4 was used). The recording on June 5 (day two) consisted of: "Inner Crisis" (take 6 was used), "First Child" (take 12 was used), "Alone" (take 5 was used). The last day of recording, June 6, the takes consisted of: "The Rise and Fall of A Short Fugue" – middle (take 7), front (take 2), and end (take 3); later they were spiced together.

== Music ==
=== Composition ===
Stan Kenton Plays Chicago is based on the music of the rock groups Chicago and Blood, Sweat, and Tears with two original works from Robert Curnow which are added very late in the development of the project.

The Chicago III Suite was a complicated work of music and the band only played it for a couple of months after the sessions. Kenton himself would get lost in the conducting during the piece and too many musical details would get missed. On the recording session itself Curnow would be the conductor for this, as were most of the works recorded in the 1970s conducted be the arrangers themselves.

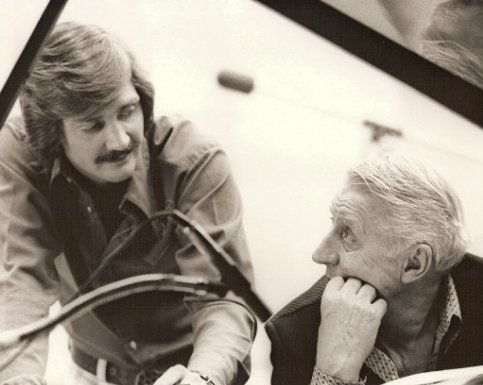
Bob Curnow & Stan Kenton Universal Studios, Chicago, Ill. June 1974 Stan Kenton Plays Chicago sessions

Dick Shearer makes commentary on the quality of the Blood, Sweat, and Tears portion of the album, "(Alone is) a classic, what Curnow did with that, with the swing chorus in the middle. And "Inner Crisis" on the original record is a piano solo at the beginning, and just listen to how Curnow re-orchestrated that for the full band."

=== Content and soloists ===
Even as one would talk of the Chicago LP as rock, Curnow has never written pure rock; at the most it has been fusion as exemplified by his later arranging of Pat Metheny's music. Kenton had even intervened in the process in having Curnow add some of his own music to round out the LP.

The soloists on the LP are played by Dick Shearer, Tony Campise, Roy Reynolds, Mike Barrowman, Kevin Jordan, and Stan Kenton himself. A special mention has to go to Peter Erskine due to his playing being featured throughout the recording sessions. This is the first recording where Erskine is to emerge as the superstar drum talent; later be with Weather Report and Steps Ahead.

== Reception and influence ==
=== Jazz scene ===
Professional ratings
Review scores
Source	Rating
Down Beat	3/5 stars
Billboard	(favorable)
Penguin Guide to Jazz on CD	2.5/5 stars
High Fidelity Magazine	(very favorable)
The Oregonian	(very favorable)

Stan Kenton Plays Chicago was released in 1974 on Creative World Records in the United States, in LP format with a double cover. In time it has been duly reviewed as a class production but at the time it received mixed reviews due to the departure from the traditional Stan Kenton style.

Stan Kenton Plays Chicago stands as an artistic highlight for both Stan Kenton and Bob Curnow. It is an album that broke ground into contemporary jazz fusion (a term not widely used at the time) and pointed the way forward in jazz orchestration.

=== Retrospect ===
The Kenton Plays Chicago sessions became a template for later works such as the Pat Metheny's works that Curnow has been so heavily involved in re-arranging for jazz orchestra. The music has been highly successful in becoming part of the core repertoire for the jazz orchestra and music being played by educational institutions and professional jazz orchestras around the world.

== Track listing ==
No.	Title	Writer(s)	Length
1.	"Canon"	James Pankow	1:36
2.	"Mother"	Robert Lamm	5:27
3.	"Once Upon A Time"	James Pankow	4:00
4.	"Free"	Robert Lamm	3:22
5.	"Alone"	Lou Marini	3:42
6.	"First Child"	Robert Curnow	4:30
7.	"Rise and Fall of a Short Fugue"	Robert Curnow	4:05
8.	"Inner Crisis"	Larry Willis	6:31

All selections arranged and orchestrated by Robert Curnow.

== Personnel ==
=== Musicians ===
- piano and leader: Stan Kenton
- saxophones and flutes: Tony Campise, Rich Condit, Greg Smith, Dick Wilkie, Roy Reynolds
- trumpets: John Harner, Dave Zeagler, Mike Barrowman, Mike Snustead, Kevin Jordan
- trombones: Dick Shearer, Lloyd Spoon, Brett Stamps, Bill Hartman (bass trombone)
- tuba: Mike Wallace
- acoustic and electric bass: Mike Ross
- drum set: Peter Erskine
- percussion: Ramon Lopez

=== Production ===
- Robert Curnow – production
- Murry Allen – recording engineering
- Paul Roewade – photography
- Jordana von Spiro – creative director
- Audree Coke – liner notes
- Robert Curnow – mix engineer

== Bibliography ==
- Easton, Carol (1973). "Straight Ahead: The Story of Stan Kenton". New York, N.Y.: William Morrow & Company, INC.
- Sparke, Michael (2010). "Stan Kenton: This Is An Orchestra". Denton, TX: University of North Texas Press.
- Sparke, Michael (1998). "Stan Kenton: The Studio Sessions". Lake Geneva, WI: Balboa Books.
- Lee, William F. (1980). "Stan Kenton: Artistry in Rhythm". Los Angeles, CA: Creative Press.
- Harris, Steven D. (2000). "The Stan Kenton Kronicles". Pasadena, CA: Dynaflow Publications.
- Cook, Richard (2002). "The Penguin Guide To Jazz On CD (6th Edition)". London, England: Penguin Books.
