= Jarmo Savolainen =

Finnish jazz pianist and composer

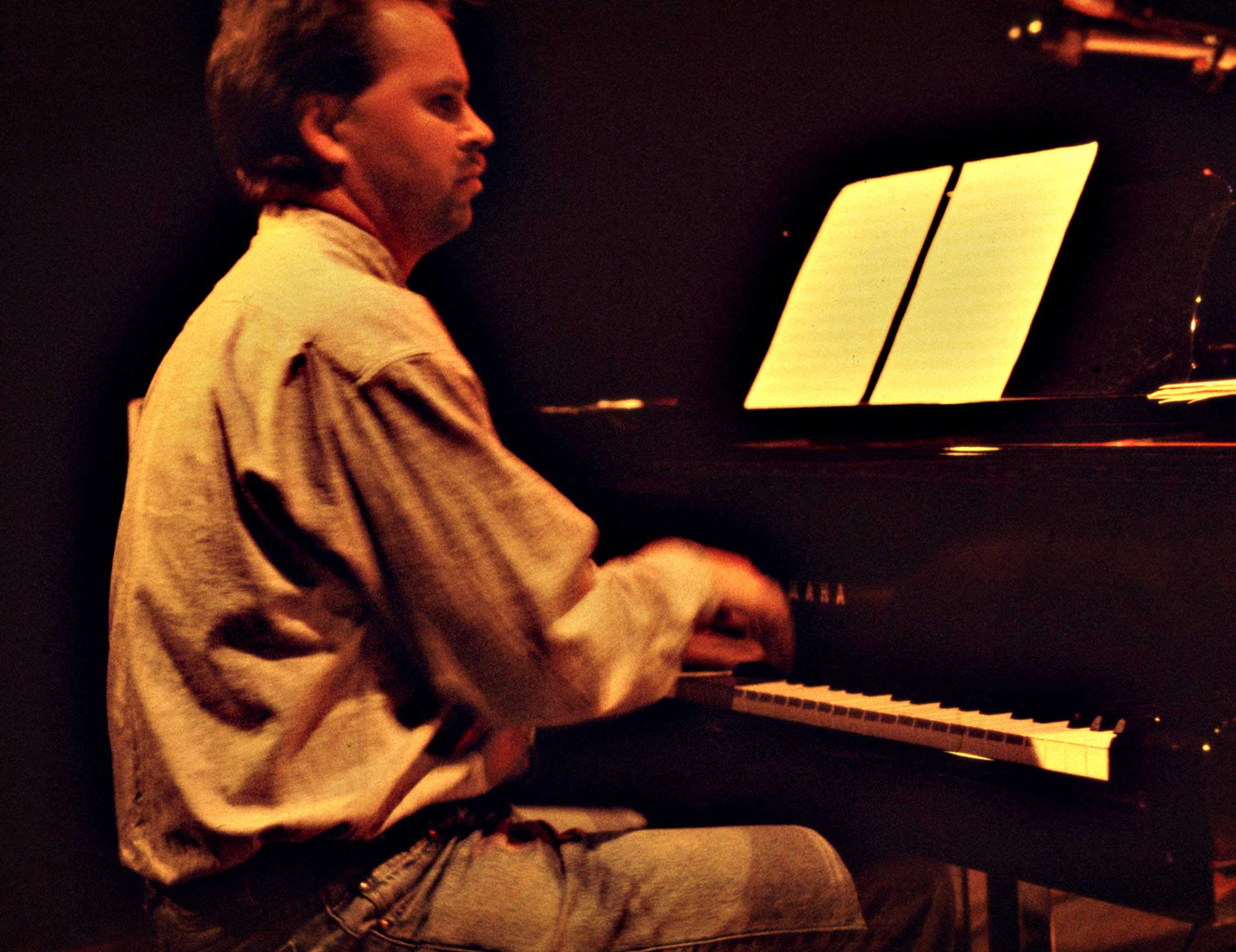
- Jarmo Savolainen 1993

Background information
- Born: 24 May 1961
- Origin: Iisalmi, Finland
- Died: 11 June 2009 (aged 48) Helsinki, Finland
- Genres: Jazz
- Occupations: Pianist, composer
- Instruments: Piano, keyboards
- Years active: c. 1985–2009

Jarmo Savolainen (24 May 1961 – 11 June 2009) was a Finnish jazz pianist and composer. He was born in Iisalmi, Eastern Finland, and first studied classical piano. He later turned his attention to jazz and studied at Berklee College of Music (starting in 1980).

== Selected discography ==
=== As leader ===
- Jarmo Savolainen Nonet (1985)
- Jarmo Savolainen Quartet: Blue Dreams (1987)
- Make Lievonen: Loru (1988; with Make Lievonen (bass))
- Phases (1989; with Seppo Kantonen (keyboards))
- Songs for solo piano (1990)
- Jarmo Savolainen Quintet: First Sight (1992; with Wallace Roney (trumpet), Rick Margitza (sax), Ron McClure (bass), and Billy Hart (drums))
- Jarmo Savolainen Quartet & Quintet: True Image (1995; with Dave Liebman and Sonny Heinilä (sax), Tim Hagans (trumpet), Ron McClure (bass), and Billy Hart (drums))
- Jarmo Savolainen Quintet: Another Story (1997; with Tim Hagans (trumpet), Sonny Heinilä (sax), Anders Jormin (bass), and Markku Ounaskari (drums))
- Jarmo Savolainen Trio: John's Sons (1998; with Uffe Krokfors (bass) and Markku Ounaskari (drums))
- Jarmo Savolainen Trio with Eric Vloeimans: Grand Style (2000; with Uffe Krokfors (bass), Markku Ounaskari (drums), and Eric Vloeimans (trumpet))
- Jarmo Savolainen Trio with Eric Vloeimans: Times like These (2002; with Uffe Krokfors (bass), Markku Ounaskari (drums), and Eric Vloeimans (trumpet))
- Soloduotrio (2004; with Sonny Heinilä (sax, woodwinds), and Maria Ylipää (vocals))
- Jarmo Savolainen Trio: Songs for Trio (2006; with Uffe Krokfors (bass), and Markku Ounaskari (drums))

=== As composer and/or sideman ===
- Finnforest – Demon Nights (1979)
- Eero Koivistoinen – Kallista on... (1988)
- Markku Johansson & Friends (1988)
- Antero Jakoila – La Morena (1991)
- UMO Jazz Orchestra: Plays BAT Jazz in Finland (1992)
- Jukka Linkola – Sketches from Karelia (1992)
- Antero Jakoila – Guitar (1993)
- Jukka Linkola – The Tentet (1994)
- Antero Jakoila – Guitar Tangos (1995)
- UMO Plays New Finnish Music (1998)
- Klaus Suonsaari – Something in Common (1998)
- UMO Plays Electric Miles (1998)
- Zone (1999; Soul Note 121294–2)
- A-Records All-Stars – edition 2000 (2000)
- Jukkis Uotila – Hunters and Gatherers (2000)
- UMO Jazz Orchestra – Transit People (2001)
- Suhkan Uhka – Suhka (2003)
- Julian F. Thayer – Zaku (2007)
