= Kenton '76 =

Studio album by Stan Kenton Orchestra
- Released: March 1976
- Recorded: December 3–5, 1975
- Studio: Universal Recording Studios, Chicago
- Genre: Jazz, Big band, Fusion jazz
- Length: 33:43
- Label: Creative World Records, GNP Crescendo
- Producer: Robert Curnow

Stan Kenton Orchestra chronology
Fire, Fury and Fun (1974)	Kenton '76 (1976)	Journey Into Capricorn (1976)

Kenton '76 is one of the last two studio albums by American jazz musician Stan Kenton and his orchestra, released in 1976, by Creative World Records. Recording sessions for the album took place in Chicago on December 3–5, 1975. The album was recorded after the longest hiatus the band would have from the studio due to financial difficulties and Kenton's growing health problems.

== Background ==
The take of Decoupage on the album is the third take, recorded on Dec 4; 10 takes of this Levy masterpiece were done over 2 days. Though the piece is one of the highlights for the band during that era, the solo by Terry Lane is weak and pointed out in later notes by Bob Curnow, "Stan did not hire most of the guys, Dick (Shearer) did. With some obvious exceptions, I don't believe the soloists in the 70's bands were the equal of the earlier bands." Samba De Haps is the first of several works written by Mark Taylor that the Kenton band recorded for the last two studio albums; he would create a distinctive signature and a name that is well known in the music publishing world.

Bob Curnow gives great credit to Hank Levy, "Time For A Change was a fantastic chart, the way it's put together, and the way the band swings within the meter. I don't mean swings necessarily in the traditional sense, but the way they play rhythmically, I think it's a hell of a chart. And if listen to the end of a Pat Metheny pieces called "Every Summer Night", it closes literally with the first four measures of 'Decoupage'." Curnow also comments on Kenton's health issues during that time, "Stan conducted the band through Holman's 'Tiburon'...Stan wasn't so quick to come to grips musically with what was happening. I was in the booth, and he was conducting, and it was a real struggle."

== Reception ==
Professional ratings
Review scores
Source	Rating
Down Beat	4/5 stars
All Music Guide	(favorable)

== Track listing ==
No.	Title	Writer(s)	Length
1.	"Time For A Change"	Hank Levy	5:54
2.	"Send In The Clowns"	Stephen Sondheim	5:09
3.	"Tiburon"	Bill Holman	4:32
4.	"My Funny Valentine"	Richard Rodgers	6:12
5.	"Decoupage"	Hank Levy	4:35
6.	"A Smith Named Greg"	Hank Levy	6:29
7.	"Samba De Haps"	Mark Taylor	3:50

Send In The Clowns and My Funny Valentine arranged by Dave Barduhn.

== Personnel ==
=== Musicians ===
- piano and leader: Stan Kenton
- saxophones and flutes: Alan Yankee, Dan Salmasian, Greg Smith, Roy Reynolds, Terry Layne
- trumpets: John Harner, Jay Sollenberger, Jim Oatts, Steve Campos, Tim Hagans
- trombones: Dick Shearer, Dave Keim, Mike Egan, Alan Morrisey (bass trombone), Douglas Purviance (bass trombone, tuba)
- acoustic and electric bass: Dave Stone
- drum set: Gary Hobbs
- percussion: Ramon Lopez

=== Production ===
- Bob Curnow – production
- Murray Allen – recording engineering
- Jordana Von Spiro – art direction
- Serge Seymour, Audree Coke, Jurgen Wiechmann – cover art/photography

== Bibliography ==
- Sparke, Michael (2010). "Stan Kenton: This Is An Orchestra". Denton, TX: University of North Texas Press.
- Sparke, Michael (1998). "Stan Kenton: The Studio Sessions". Lake Geneva, WI: Balboa Books.
