= Fire, Fury and Fun =

Fire, Fury, and Fun

Studio album by Stan Kenton Orchestra
- Released: 1974
- Recorded: September 26–27, 1974
- Studio: Universal Studios, Chicago, Illinois
- Genre: Jazz, Big band, Fusion jazz
- Length: 33:43
- Label: Creative World Records, GNP Crescendo
- Producer: Robert Curnow

Stan Kenton Orchestra chronology
Stan Kenton Plays Chicago (1974)	Fire, Fury, and Fun (1974)	Kenton '76 (1976)

Fire, Fury, and Fun is a studio album by American jazz musician Stan Kenton and his orchestra, released on Creative World Records. Recording sessions for the album took place in Chicago on September 26/27, 1974 at Universal Recording.

== Background ==
Up to the time of Fire Fury and Fun the band had primarily made recordings of music that were swing oriented with progressive leanings. The transition from Capitol to Creative World Records in 1970 was fraught with difficulties during a time when the music business was changing rapidly. As a viable jazz artist who was trying to keep a loyal but dwindling following, Kenton turned to arrangers such as Hank Levy to write material that appealed to a younger audience. The first releases for the Creative World label were live concerts and Kenton had the control he wanted over content but lacked substantial resources to engineer, mix, and promote what Capitol underwrote in the past.

In June 1973 Curnow had started as the new artists and repertoire manager overseeing the whole operation of the Creative World Records. As per Curnow himself, "That was a remarkable and very difficult time for me. I was managing (Stan's) record company with NO experience in business, writing music like mad, living in a new place and culture (Los Angeles was another world), traveling a LOT (out with the band at least 1 week a month) and trying to keep it together at home." The Fire Fury and Fun album was an outgrowth of and designed as a showcase for several of the current soloists in the Kenton Orchestra. The band itself had very little time to prepare the music for the sessions, but that was the norm for many recordings done by a road band such as the Kenton orchestra.

== Ratings ==
Professional ratings
Review scores
Source	Rating
The Virgin Encyclopedia of Jazz	2/4 stars
AllMusic Guide	2.5/5 stars

For this late-period Stan Kenton recording, the bandleader decided to present five of his top soloists from the era: baritonist Roy Reynolds, Tony Campise (mainly on flute), trombonist Dick Shearer, drummer Peter Erskine and Ramon Lopez on congas. Kenton himself is featured on piano during two numbers, but none of his sidemen make very strong impressions and the orchestra on the whole sounds like an anonymous college stage band. Fire, Fury and Fun is a lesser effort although Erskine (and trumpeter Tim Hagans) would become far more notable in future years.

— Scott Yanow, AllMusic Guide,

== Track listing ==
No.	Title	Writer(s)	Length
1.	"Roy's Blues"	Dale Devoe	7:54
2.	"Montage"	Ken Hanna	5:46
3.	"Pete Is A Four-Letter Word"	Hank Levy	4:17
4.	"Hogfat Blues"	Lloyd Spoon, Tony Campise	4:40
5.	"Quiet Friday"	Hank Levy	6:34
6.	"Ramon Lopez"	Chico O'Farrill	6:20

== Personnel ==
=== Musicians ===
- piano and leader: Stan Kenton
- saxophones and flutes: Tony Campise, Rich Condit, Greg Smith, Dan Salmasian, Roy Reynolds
- trumpets: John Harner, Dave Zeagler, Mike Barrowman, Tim Hagans, Kevin Jordan
- trombones: Dick Shearer, Lloyd Spoon, Dave Keim, Greg Sorcsek (bass trombone)
- tuba: Mike Suter
- acoustic and electric bass: Mike Ross
- drum set: Peter Erskine
- percussion: Ramon Lopez

=== Production ===
- Robert Curnow – production
- Murry Allen – recording engineering
- David McMacken – creative director, graphics
- Robert Curnow – mix engineer

== Bibliography ==
- Easton, Carol (1973). Straight Ahead: The Story of Stan Kenton. New York, N.Y.: William Morrow & Company, INC.
- Sparke, Michael (2010). Stan Kenton: This Is An Orchestra. Denton, TX: University of North Texas Press.
- Sparke, Michael (1998). Stan Kenton: The Studio Sessions. Lake Geneva, WI: Balboa Books.
- Lee, William F. (1980). Stan Kenton: Artistry in Rhythm. Los Angeles, CA: Creative Press.
- Harris, Steven D. (2000). The Stan Kenton Kronicles. Pasadena, CA: Dynaflow Publications.
- Cook, Richard (2002). The Penguin Guide To Jazz On CD (6th ed.). London, England: Penguin Books.
