= Peter Erskine =

American jazz drummer (born 1954)

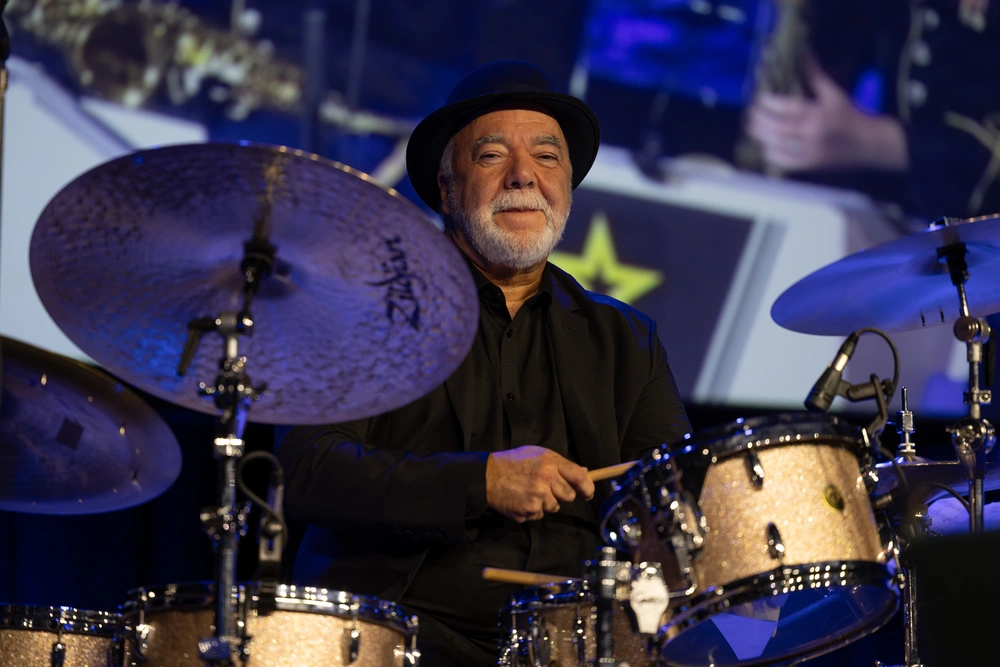
- Erskine in 2024

Background information
- Born: Peter Clark Erskine; June 5, 1954 (age 72); Somers Point, New Jersey, U.S.
- Genres: Jazz; jazz fusion
- Occupation: Musician
- Instrument: Drums
- Years active: 1972–present
- Labels: Contemporary; Denon; Ah Um; RCA/Novus; Passport
- Formerly of: Weather Report; Steps Ahead
- Spouse: Mutsuko Nigatawa
- Website: www.petererskine.com

Peter Clark Erskine (born June 5, 1954) is an American jazz drummer who was a member of the jazz fusion groups Weather Report and Steps Ahead.

== Early life and education ==
Erskine was born in Somers Point, New Jersey, U.S. He began playing the drums at the age of four. He graduated from the Interlochen Arts Academy in Michigan and then studied percussion at Indiana University.

== Career ==
His professional music career started in 1972 when he joined the Stan Kenton Orchestra. After four years with Kenton, he joined Maynard Ferguson for two years. In 1978, he joined Weather Report, joining Jaco Pastorius in the rhythm section. After four years and five albums with Weather Report and the Jaco Pastorius big band's Word of Mouth, he joined Steps Ahead.

In 1983, he performed on the Antilles Records release Swingrass '83. He toured the US in 1992 with Chick Corea.

Erskine splits his time as a musician and a professor at the Thornton School of Music at the University of Southern California.

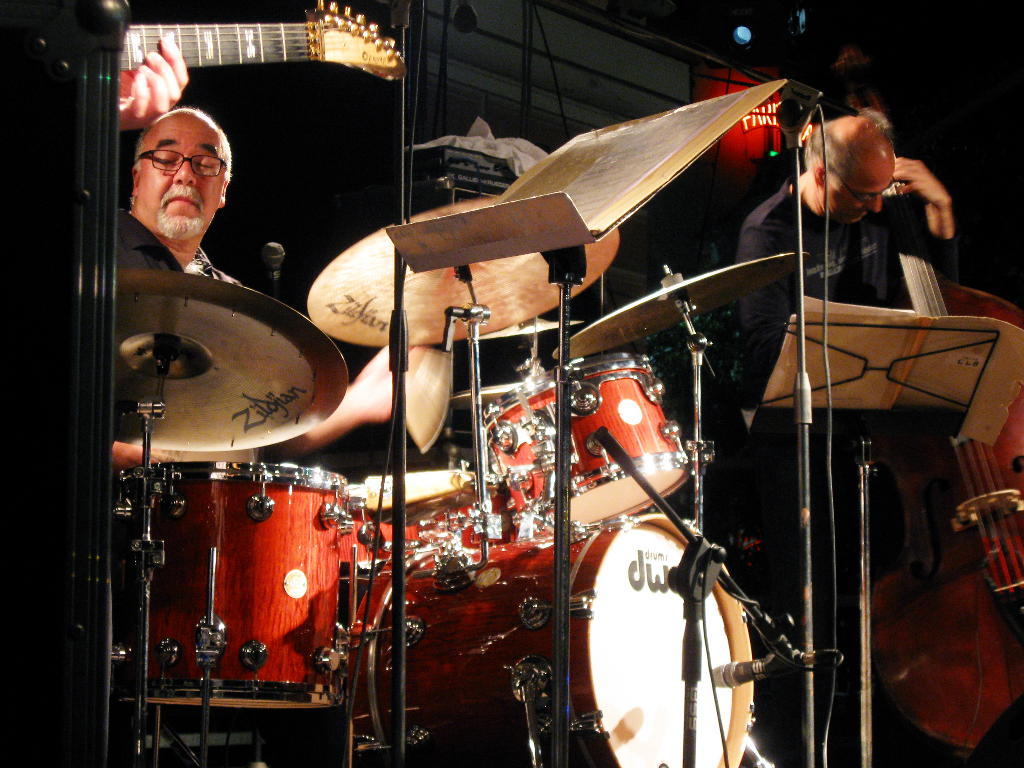
Erskine with Michel Benita in 2008.

He was featured on Kate Bush's 2005 album Aerial, where Erskine teamed with bass player Eberhard Weber. Diana Krall, Eliane Elias, Queen Latifah and Linda Ronstadt, as well as Scottish and Finnish classical orchestras, have had Erskine perform as a featured musician.

In 2011, he appeared on stage at the Royal Opera House, London in the new opera Anna Nicole. In the 2016 film La La Land, he was the principal drummer in the orchestral ensemble that produced the soundtrack.

== Honors and awards ==
In 1992, he was awarded an Honorary Doctorate of Music from Berklee College of Music.

== Personal life ==
Erskine is married to Mutsuko Erskine. The two have two children, actress and writer Maya Erskine, and film editor and producer Taichi Erskine.

== Discography ==
=== As leader ===
Year recorded	Title	Label	Year released	Notes
1982?	Peter Erskine	Contemporary	1982	
1986?	Transition	Passport Jazz	1987	
1988	Motion Poet	Denon	1988	
1989?	Aurora	Denon	1989	
1991	Sweet Soul	Novus	1992	
1992	You Never Know	ECM	1993	
1993	Time Being	ECM	1994	
1995?	History of the Drum	Interworld	1995	
1995	As It Is	ECM	1996	
1997?	As The Lounge Art Ensemble, Lava Jazz	Fuzzy Music	1997	
1997	Juni	ECM	1999	
1999	Live at Rocco	Fuzzy Music	2000	[2CD] live
2001	Side Man Blue	Fuzzy Music	2016	
2010	Joy Luck	Fuzzy Music	2011	
2015	Dr. Um	Fuzzy Music	2016	
2016?	In Praise of Shadows	Fuzzy Music	2016	
2016	Second Opinion	Fuzzy Music	2017	
2017	Live In Italy	Abeat	2018	live in Occhiobello
2018?	On Call	Fuzzy Music	2018	[2CD]

=== As co-leader ===
- 1985: Current Events with John Abercrombie, Marc Johnson (ECM, 1986)
- 1988: John Abercrombie / Marc Johnson / Peter Erskine (ECM, 1989) – live
- 1991: StAR with Jan Garbarek, Miroslav Vitous (ECM, 1991)
- 1994: Traction Avant with Alessandro Galati, Palle Danielsson (Via Veneto, 1995)
- 1995?: From Kenton to Now with Richard Torres (Fuzzy Music, 1995)
- 1996: Jason Salad! with Alessandro Galati, John Patitucci, Bob Sheppard (Via Veneto, 1997)
- 1996: Turnage: Blood on the Floor with John Scofield, Martin Robertson, Peter Rundel (Decca, 1997)
- 1998: Live at the Baked Potato with Dirk K., Jörg Kleutgens (Kalle Fornia, 1998) – live
- 1998: The Hudson Project with John Abercrombie, Bob Mintzer, John Patitucci (Stretch, 2000) – live
- 2000: ELB with Nguyên Lê, Michel Benita (ACT, 2001)
- 2001: Badlands with Alan Pasqua, Dave Carpenter (Fuzzy Music, 2002)
- 2002?: Turnage: Fractured Lines with Evelyn Glennie, Christian Lindberg, Leonard Slatkin (Chandos, 2002)
- 2006: Worth the Wait with Tim Hagans (Fuzzy Music, 2008) – live
- 2007?: Way You Look Tonight with Alan Pasqua, Dave Carpenter (Field Work Music, 2007)
- 2008?: Dream Flight with ELB (ACT, 2008)
- 2009?: The Trio Live @ Charlie O's (Fuzzy Music, 2009) – live
- 2009: Scenes from a Dream with Chris Minh Doky, Larry Goldings (Red Dot Music, 2010)
- 2010?: The Interlochen Concert with Alan Pasqua Darek Oles (Fuzzy Music, 2010) – live
- 2010?: Standards 2: Movie Music with Bob Mintzer, Darek Oleszkiewicz, Alan Pasqua (Fuzzy Music, 2011) – soundtrack
- 2015: Trio M/E/D with Palle Danielsson, Rita Marcotulli (Abeat, 2015) – live
- 2015: How Long Is Now? with Lars Danielsson, Iiro Rantala (ACT, 2016)
- 2019: 3 Nights in L.A. with George Garzone, Alan Pasqua and Darek Oles (Fuzzy Music, 2019)[3CD] – live
- 2021: Live In Italy with Alan Pasqua, Darek Oles (Fuzzy Music, 2022) – live

=== As a member ===
Steps Ahead

- Steps Ahead (Elektra/Musician, 1983)
- Modern Times (Elektra/Musician, 1984)
- Magnetic (Elektra, 1986)
- Holding Together (NYC, 2002)[2CD] – live rec. 1999

=== As sideman ===
With Rez Abbasi

- Third Ear (Cathexis, 1995) – rec. 1991–92
- Modern Memory (Cathexis, 1998)

With John Abercrombie

- 1987: Getting There (ECM, 1988)
- 1992: November (ECM, 1993)

With David Benoit

- Waiting for Spring (GRP, 1989)
- Letter to Evan (GRP, 1992)
- The Benoit/Freeman Project 2 with Russ Freeman (Peak, 2004)

With Wayne Bergeron

- You Call This a Living? (Weg, 2002)
- Full Circle (Wayne Bergeron, 2016) – rec. 2012–15

With Warren Bernhardt

- Warren Bernhardt Trio '83 (DMP, 1983)
- Hands On (DMP, 1987)
- Heat of the Moment (DMP, 1989)
- Amelia's Song (DMP, 2003)
- So Real (DMP, 2003)

With Randy Bernsen

- Music for Planets People and Washing Machines (Amc, 1984)
- Mo' Wasabi (Zebra, 1986)

With Chris Botti

- Slowing Down the World (GRP, 1999)
- December (Columbia, 2002)

With Michael Bublé

- Crazy Love (Reprise, 2009)
- Christmas (Reprise, 2011)
- Love (Reprise, 2018)

With Gary Burton

- 1988?: Times Like These (GRP, 1988)
- 1989: Reunion (GRP, 1990)
- 1991?: Cool Nights (GRP, 1991)
- 1993: It's Another Day (GRP, 1994)
- 1996: Departure (Concord Jazz, 1997)

With Joey Calderazzo

- In the Door (Blue Note, 1991)
- The Traveler (Blue Note, 1993)

With George Cables

- Cables' Vision (Contemporary, 1980)
- Whisper Not (Atlas, 1981)
- The Big Jazz Trio (Eastworld, 1984)
- Circle (Contemporary, 1985)
- Shared Secrets (MuseFX, 2002)

With Alex Cline

- Sparks Fly Upward (Cryptogramophone, 1999)
- The Constant Flame (Cryptogramophone, 2001)

With Pino Daniele

- Medina (RCA, 2001)
- Passi D'Autore (RCA, 2004)
- Il mio nome è Pino Daniele e vivo qui (RCA, 2007)

With Eddie Daniels

- Benny Rides Again with Gary Burton (GRP, 1992)
- Under the Influence (GRP, 1993)
- The Five Seasons (Shanachie, 1995)

With Yelena Eckemoff

- Cold Sun (L&H, 2010)
- Flying Steps (L&H, 2010)
- Glass Song (L&H, 2013)
- Desert (L&H, 2018)

With Eliane Elias

- Cross Currents (Denon, 1987)
- So Far So Close (Blue Note, 1989)
- A Long Story (Manhattan, 1991)
- Fantasia (Blue Note, 1992)
- Paulistana (Blue Note, 1993)
- Time and Again (Candid, 2024)

With Maynard Ferguson

- Conquistador (Columbia, 1977)
- New Vintage (Columbia, 1977)
- Carnival (Columbia, 1978)

With Don Grolnick

- Hearts and Numbers (Hip Pocket, 1985)
- Weaver of Dreams (Blue Note, 1990)

With Bob James

- Foxie (Tappan Zee, 1983)
- The Genie: Themes & Variations From The TV Series "Taxi" (Columbia, 1983)
- The Swan (CBS/Sony, 1984)

With Marc Johnson

- Bass Desires (ECM, 1985)
- Second Sight (ECM, 1987)

With Stan Kenton

- National Anthems of the World (Creative World, 1972)
- Birthday in Britain (Creative World, 1973)
- 7.5 on the Richter Scale (Creative World, 1973)
- Live at the London Hilton 1973 Vol. 2 (Status, 1973) – live
- Fire, Fury, and Fun (Creative World, 1974)
- Stan Kenton plays Chicago (Creative World, 1974)
- Street of Dreams (Creative World, 1992) – rec. 1970–76
- Live at Carthage College Vol. 1 (Magic, 1994) – live
- Live at the London Hilton 1973 Vol. 1 (Status, 1994) – live rec. 1973
- At Pavilion Hemel Hempstead England 1973 (Status, 1996) – live rec. 1973
- Live at Newport Jazz Festival (Jazz Band, 1999) – live
- At the Arcadia Theatre 1974 (Magic, 2000) – live rec. 1974

With Diana Krall

- The Look of Love (Verve, 2001)
- The Girl in the Other Room (Verve, 2004)

With Chuck Loeb

- Simple Things (DMP, 1994)
- Silhouette (Shanachie, 2013)

With Mike Mainieri

- Wanderlust (Warner Bros., 1981)
- An American Diary (NYC, 1995)
- An American Diary: The Dreamings (NYC, 1997)

With Vince Mendoza

- Start Here (World Pacific, 1990)
- Jazzpaña (Atlantic, 1993)
- Sketches (ACT, 1994)
- WDR Big Band Köln, Caribbean Night (BHM Productions, 1997)

With Al Di Meola

- Orange and Blue (Tomato, 1994)
- The Infinite Desire (Telarc, 1998)
- Pursuit of Radical Rhapsody (Concord, 2011)

With Bob Mintzer

- Source (Agharta, 1982)
- Papa Lips (Eastworld, 1983)
- Incredible Journey (DMP, 1985)
- Camouflage (DMP, 1986)
- Spectrum (DMP, 1988)
- Urban Contours (DMP, 1989)
- Art of the Big Band (DMP, 1991)
- Departure (DMP, 1993)
- Hymn (Owl, 1991) – rec. 1990
- I Remember Jaco (Novus, 1992)
- The First Decade (DMP, 1995)
- Quality Time (TVT, 1998)
- Gently (DMP, 2002)
- For the Moment, (MCG Jazz, 2012)
- All L.A. Band (Fuzzy, 2016)

With Makoto Ozone

- Now You Know (Columbia, 1987)
- Walk Alone (JVC Victor, 1992)

With Alan Pasqua

- My New Old Friend (Cryptogramophone, 2005)
- Standards (Fuzzy Music, 2007)

With Jaco Pastorius

- Word of Mouth (Warner Bros., 1981) – rec. 1980–81
- Invitation (Warner Bros., 1983) – live rec. 1982
- The Birthday Concert (Warner Bros., 1995) – rec. 1981
- Twins Live in Japan 1982 (1999) – live rec. 1982
- Guitar & Bass (2004)
- Live in Japan (2005)
- Introducing: Jaco Pastorius (2006)
- The Word Is Out (2006)
- Live and Outrageous (2007)
- The Florida Concert (2008)
- Truth, Liberty & Soul (Resonance, 2017) – live rec. 1982

With John Patitucci

- John Patitucci (GRP, 1987)
- Sketchbook (GRP, 1990)
- Mistura Fina (GRP, 1995)

With Lee Ritenour

- Rit's House (GRP, 2002)
- Rhythm Sessions (Concord, 2012)

With John Scofield

- Summertime with Pat Metheny (Bugsy, 1994)[2CD]
- Shortcuts - Jazzpar Combo 1999 with Hans Ulrik (Stunt, 2000) – rec. 1999

With Mike Stern

- Time in Place (Atlantic, 1988)
- Jigsaw (Atlantic, 1989)

With Sadao Watanabe

- Sweet Deal (Elektra, 1991)
- A Night with Strings (Elektra, 1992)
- I'm with you (Victor, 2014)

With Weather Report

- Mr. Gone (Columbia, 1978)
- 8:30 (Columbia, 1979)
- Night Passage (Columbia, 1980)
- Weather Report (Columbia, 1982)
- This is This! (Columbia, 1986)
- Live and Unreleased (Columbia, 2002)
- Forecast: Tomorrow (Columbia, 2006)

With Kenny Wheeler

- Music for Large & Small Ensembles (ECM, 1990)
- The Widow in the Window (ECM, 1990)
- Kayak (Ah Um, 1992)

With others

- Joni Mitchell, Mingus (Asylum, 1979)
- Bobby Hutcherson, Un Poco Loco (Columbia, 1979) – rec. 1979
- Joe Farrell, Sonic Text (Contemporary, 1980) - rec. 1979
- Kazumi Watanabe, To Chi Ka (Nippon Columbia, 1980)
- Joe Henderson, Relaxin' at Camarillo (Contemporary, 1981) – rec. 1979
- Various Artists, Swingrass '83 (Antilles, 1983)
- Ben Sidran, Bop City (Antilles, 1984)
- Andy LaVerne, Liquid Silver (DMP, 1984)
- Bill Reichenbach Jr., Bill Reichenbach Quartet (Silver Seven, 1984)
- Stanley Jordan, Magic Touch (Blue Note, 1985)
- Peter Sprague, Na Pali Coast (Concord Jazz, 1985)
- Mitchel Forman, Train of Thought (Magenta, 1985)
- Gary Peacock, Guamba (ECM, 1987)
- Bob Berg, Short Stories (Denon, 1987)
- Michael Brecker, Don't Try This at Home (Impulse!, 1988)
- Doc Severinsen, Facets (Amherst, 1988)
- Lyle Mays, Street Dreams (Geffen, 1988)
- Rickie Lee Jones, Flying Cowboys (Geffen, 1989)
- Joe Diorio, Minor Elegance (MGI, 1989)
- Michael Franks, Blue Pacific (Reprise, 1990)
- Wolfgang Muthspiel, The Promise (Amadeo, 1990)
- Rick Margitza, Hope (Blue Note, 1991)
- Bob Sheppard, Tell Tale Signs (Windham Hill Jazz, 1991)
- Ralph Towner, Open Letter (ECM, 1992)
- John Beasley, Cauldron (Windham Hill Jazz, 1992)
- Randy Crawford, Through the Eyes of Love (Warner Bros., 1992)
- Jimmy Haslip, Arc (GRP, 1993)
- Arturo Sandoval, Dream Come True (GRP, 1993)
- Tiger Okoshi, Echoes of a Note (JVC, 1993)
- Michel Legrand, Michel Plays Legrand (LaserLight, 1993)
- Jon Herington, The Complete Rhyming Dictionary (Glass House, 1993)
- Toots Thielemans, East Coast West Coast (Reprise, 1994)
- Hubert Laws, Storm Then the Calm (Jazz Heritage, 1994)
- Michael Franks, Abandoned Garden (Warner Bros., 1995)
- Steely Dan, Alive in America (Giant, 1995) – live rec. 1993–94
- Didier Lockwood, New York Rendez-Vous (JMS., 1995)
- Martial Solal, Triangle (JMS., 1995)
- Kyle Eastwood, From There to Here (Columbia, 1998)
- Steve Tyrell, A New Standard (Atlantic, 1999)
- Brandon Fields, Fields & Strings (Paras Recordings, 1999)
- Andy Summers, Green Chimneys (BMG, 1999)
- Rolf Kühn, Internal Eyes (Intuition, 1999)
- Rickie Lee Jones, It's Like This (Artemis, 2000)
- Don Grolnick, London Concert (Fuzzy Music, 2000) – live rec. 1995
- Joni Mitchell, Both Sides Now (Reprise, 2000) – rec. 1999
- Marc Antoine, Cruisin' (GRP, 2001)
- Laurence Juber, Different Times (Solid Air, 2001)
- Kurt Elling, Flirting with Twilight (Blue Note, 2001)
- Barbra Streisand, Christmas Memories (Columbia, 2001)
- Diane Schuur, Midnight (Concord, 2003)
- Gordon Goodwin's Big Phat Band, XXL (Silverline, 2003)
- Al Jarreau, Accentuate the Positive (GRP, 2004)
- Linda Ronstadt, Hummin' to Myself (Verve, 2004)
- Kate Bush, Aerial (EMI, 2005)
- Eric Marienthal, Got You Covered (Peak, 2005)
- Chris Walden Big Band, Home of My Heart (Origin, 2005)
- Joe Zawinul, Weather Update (Geneon, 2005)[DVD-Video]
- Randy Brecker, Some Skunk Funk (Telarc, 2005) – rec. 2003
- Matt Dusk, Back in Town (Decca, 2006)
- Bob Florence, Eternal Licks and Grooves (Mama, 2007)
- Lynda Carter, At Last (Potomac Productions, 2009)
- Michael Bublé, Crazy Love (Reprise, 2009)
- Dado Moroni, Live in Beverly Hills (Resonance, 2010)[CD + DVD-Video]
- Barbra Streisand, What Matters Most (Columbia, 2011)
- Rod Stewart, Merry Christmas Baby (Verve, 2012)
- Melody Gardot, The Absence (Decca, 2012)
- Tierney Sutton, After Blue (BFM Jazz, 2013)
- Janis Siegel, Nightsongs (Palmetto, 2013)
- Andrea Bocelli, Passione (Verve, 2013)
- Barbra Streisand, Partners (Columbia, 2014)
- Sara Niemietz, Fountain & Vine (Levi Snuff Music, 2015)
- Laura Pausini, Laura Xmas (Warner Music Latina, 2016)
- Katharine McPhee, I Fall in Love Too Easily (BMG, 2017)
- Martina McBride, It's the Holiday Season (Broken Bow, 2018)

== Books ==
- Time Awareness
- The Erskine Method for Drumset
- My Book
- The Drum Perspective
- Drum Concepts and Techniques
- No Beethoven: An Autobiography and Chronicle of Weather Report

== DVD ==
- The Erskine Method for Drumset (Alfred Publishing Company)
