= Coast to Coast (McDonald's Jazz Band album) =

1984 studio album by The McDonald's All-American, High School Jazz Band 1983/1984

Studio album by The McDonald's All-American High School Jazz Band 1983/1984
- Released: 1984
- Recorded: RMS Recording Studio; Las Vegas, NV
- Genre: Jazz, big band, instrumental
- Length: 40:05
- Label: McDonald's MDC 91884
- Producer: Robert Curnow
- cat. # MDC 91884

Coast to Coast is a 1984 album (LP Vinyl) released by McDonald's All-American High School Jazz Band under the direction of Bob Curnow. The group was formed in 1981 as a part of the McDonald's All-American High School Band program that had started back in the late 1960s to feature talented, up and coming high school musicians.

== Background ==
As part of the 1983-84 McDonald's All-American High School Band, the jazz band was formed (from within the larger group) to more specifically feature up and coming high school jazz musicians from all over the United States. The Coast to Coast LP was part of the overall program Bob Curnow and McDonald's helped to achieve in 1983/84 with these high school student musicians. The LP stands out with the fact the group recorded with no overdubs at all and the solos going live to a 24 track board; this was all done in a 5-hour time span. The level of student and performance is outstanding. During the time in Las Vegas recording the LP the group also did a special appearance on the nationally televised Jerry Lewis MDA Labor Day Telethon. This was part of the yearly national appearances the ensemble would do on tour. Several of the student musicians on the LP have become very prominent names on the international music scene to include Greg Gisbert, Harry Allen, and Eric Miyashiro.

== Reception ==
Professional ratings
Review scores
Source	Rating
Cadence Magazine	very positive
Los Angeles Times	very positive
ASBDA Journal	very positive
Tom Lord jazz discography	(listing), 2004

"...out of those 105 musicians, 20 eventually become members of the All-American High School Jazz Band...(The LP) features the 1983-4 edition and it's quite impressive. The players certainly do not sound like teenagers and some of the soloists, particularly trumpeters John Bailey and Greg Gisbert stand out as musicians to watch in the future. The charts are particularly colorful..."

Cadence Magazine

== Track listing ==
No.	Title	Length
1.	"I Got Rhythm (George Gershwin, arr. Rob McConnell)"	4:06
2.	"A Time For Love (Johnny Mandel, arr. Hank Levy)"	3:50
3.	"The Diver (Matt Harris)"	6:10
4.	"Blue Chip (Sammy Nestico)"	7:42
5.	"Scorpion Dance (Robert Curnow)"	5:24
6.	"Body and Soul (Johnny Green, arr. Marty Paich)"	6:04
7.	"The Flintstones Theme (William Hanna, Joseph Barbera, arr. Roger Pemberton)"	5:24
8.	"McDonald's Theme Medley (arr. Robert Curnow)"	5:43

== Recording sessions ==
- Recorded: September 1984, RMS Recording Studio, Las Vegas, Nevada

== Personnel ==
=== Musicians ===
- Conductor: Robert Curnow
- Saxophones: Terry Goss, Scott Ackerman, Harry Allen, Chris Conelius, Pete Giancola
- Trumpets and flugelhorns: Barry Parr, John Bailey, Greg Gisbert, Mike Burnette, Doug James
- Trombones: John DiLutis, Tom Riccobono, Jeff Knutson, Jeff Lindholm, Mark Rusch
- Guitar: Hamp Brockman
- Piano: Karen Mietz
- Bass: Jeff Parker
- Drums/Percussion: Joe Mansir
- Drums/Percussion: Andy Wright

=== Production ===
- Recording engineer: Lou Carlo, Jr.
- Mixing engineer: Tom Miller, Universal Studios, Chicago
- Mastering: K-Disc, Hollywood, CA
- Cover art: Stephanie Trusz
- Photography: Richard Shay, Tom Kravitz
- Liner Notes: Leonard Feather
