= Jazz education =

Each style and era of jazz adopted new techniques to help educate younger musicians. Early forms of jazz education were more informal. Since the first degree program was founded in 1947, the rise of institutionalized jazz education, resulted in jazz education becoming more formalized and more structured. Formalized jazz education has brought a new wave of interest in jazz. JazzTimes.com currently lists 492 collegiate jazz programs globally. This database is exclusive to just schools that offer majors and does not include the number of schools that also offer jazz courses in their curriculum. The formalization of jazz was and still is a controversial subject. Many professional musicians believe that it has harmed the spirit of the music, while others maintain that it has been beneficial for the art form.

== Early jazz education ==
Jazz has long been celebrated for its roots as an aural tradition. This defined early jazz education in New Orleans, where the music originated among musicians who largely could not read music. Early musically literate musicians who were able to afford formal music lessons, such as Jelly Roll Morton, scorned formal education and were left with varying degrees of musical literacy. In New Orleans at the turn of the 20th century, as jazz was taking form from its roots, musicians learned in a style that is best described as an apprenticeship. Younger musicians would study with an older and more experienced musician, learning by listening to the music their mentor played. This relationship also extended to a personal level. Many of these younger musicians would run errands for their mentors in order to repay them for the musical lessons. An early example of this style of education is Louis Armstrong, who studied under famed trumpet player King Oliver. This educational form was dependent on aural skills. This style of pedagogy was prevalent in an era where the music relied heavily on group improvisation. The use, almost exclusively, of ear training amongst pedagogues and the cultural influence of New Orleans made this style of jazz the most practical and popular.

In the late 1910s and early 1920s, jazz begins to move north to Chicago and New York City. These two urban areas were particularly popular because they provided a larger audience base for performers and closer proximity to recording studios. During the early part of the 1920s, New Orleans Jazz was prevalent in the many nightclubs sprung up in Chicago. In New York a new style of jazz became immensely popular. This style, known as Big Band, ushered in a new era of jazz education.

Big band music is particularly important for jazz education because it introduces a number of new forums for the furthering of jazz music. The first such forum is the arranger. With the emergence of big bands arose a need for more detailed and thorough arrangements. Arrangers helped to standardize big band vocabulary. With the arranger, jazz began to mature from its roots as an exclusively aural art form. The arranger helped to introduce new influences, especially Impressionist Music during the big band era.

The next influential introduction of the big band era was the emergence of after hours jam sessions. Many ideas for arrangements developed from after hours jam sessions. Many of these ideas would eventually turn into arrangements of their own. Duke Ellington used this technique to create new tunes and arrangements.

These jam sessions were also a pivotal forum for the development of jazz improvisation. Jam sessions were home to the exploration of and self-education in improvisation. Musicians used these sessions as a way to learn from fellow musicians to improve their own skills. Clubs like Monroe’s Uptown House and Minton’s Playhouse became the public home for the phenomena that already took place in apartments and smaller venues across Manhattan and the rest of the country. The style that most directly descended from these jam sessions is known as bebop. Early bebop musicians such as Charlie Parker, Dizzy Gillespie and Thelonious Monk introduced a new and more virtuosic style of improvising that proved influential to future generations of jazz musicians

== Early university jazz programs ==
Jazz bands in secondary schools and colleges typically emerged as extracurricular auxiliary ensembles, derived from larger concert or marching bands. The earliest college jazz bands were not offered for academic credit and were usually organized and led by students. (Oxford Music Online)

Prior to the first jazz degree, some academic classes were offered. In 1941 the New School for Social Research in Manhattan offered a jazz history course. In 1945 a school known as the Schillinger House opened in Boston. This school "offered a two year curriculum and awarded an artist diploma." In 1973, the Schillinger House, which became the Berklee School of Music in 1954, officially changed its name to Berklee College of Music. The first college degree in jazz was offered in 1947 at the University of North Texas. Over the course of the next few decades, jazz programs popped up all over the country and around the world. This Timeline of jazz education, notes the starting dates of many of these influential programs.

By 1950, there were over 30 colleges and universities offering jazz courses. Along with this growth at universities came a number of summer programs that served to educate young musicians about jazz. Stan Kenton is particularly famous for starting one such summer program. These summer camps were some of the first academic institution of any type to invite professional musicians to help educate young students. This precedent continued to become more prominent.

== Creating a jazz curriculum ==
One of the most difficult, controversial and necessary steps in molding jazz into an academic program was standardization and formalization of jazz music. Prior to the introduction of the first jazz academic programs, musicians attempted to produce literature that explained jazz in a formal manner. Norbert Beihoff (né Norbert John Beihoff; 1904–2003) first attempted to explain jazz improvisation and arranging in a 1935 publication entitled Modern Arranging and Orchestration (OCLC 191822905). Professional musicians wrote method books, some with accompanying play-along records. Down Beat magazine published transcribed solos and pedagogical articles. In 1941 Joseph Schillinger published The Schillinger System of Musical Composition, a widely used text based on his own system of jazz arranging. George Russell wrote a text entitled Lydian Chromatic Concept of Tonal Organization in 1953, promoting the idea that jazz chords have corresponding scales that may be used for improvisation". These books did not have a universal impact and were quickly forgotten. As the discipline expanded it became increasingly necessary to create standardized material to support a jazz curriculum. Early jazz educators such as Jamey Aebersold, David Baker and Jerry Coker laid the groundwork for a more universal educational practice. The first round of textbooks and other resources was characterized by an emphasis on strict formalization and structure, on the definition of levels, and on establishing a relatively narrow core early Aebersold books. In this clarification process, harmonic structures also became codified, and progressions such as the twelve-bar blues and the ii-V-I were defined as the easiest and most common, as indeed they were at the time."

Aebersold's Play-A-Long book and record combinations had particular influence, with sales of over 5 million copies since they first were introduced in 1967. Working with many music educators through workshops, including the Summer Jazz Workshop, Aebersold expanded his materials into a system, recommending a particular approach to chord-scale improvisation and the use of his Scale Syllabus. Today, many musicians continue to use Play-A-Long materials, from Aebersold or software-based providers, to learn theory while playing over backing tracks.

"The need to justify jazz education as worthy of institutional and cultural attention led to a clear, if in retrospect slightly limited, definition of a single jazz style and related set of skills." The style that came to the fore for early jazz educators was bebop. Bebop improvisation is based on these fairly standard patterns and usually performed at tempos that force musicians to acquire a high level of facility with their instrument. Bebop vocabulary quickly became an important part of early formalized jazz education.

Overlooked by this approach were the equally developed written techniques of jazz music. By this point in time, jazz composition and arranging had in its own right reached virtuosic levels. Written jazz, thanks in large part to the popularity of the swing era, established its own traditions within jazz music. One of the first educators to incorporate this aspect of jazz into was Gene Hall, a graduate of University of North Texas. Gene Hall, who had written a master's thesis there in which he outlined a proposed college-level jazz curriculum, became the first faculty member in the new program. Central to Hall's curriculum was an arranging class for which a laboratory ensemble performed student arrangements and compositions. That ensemble became the One O'Clock Lab Band."

== Educational ensembles ==
The end of World War II signified the end of the big band era. Even prior to this band leaders experienced difficulty financial supporting larger ensembles. As early as 1930, bands were trimming down to smaller ensembles. After the war, only a handful of the most prolific big bands survived. Many of these bands continued to tour for a number of years, but big bands have never enjoyed the professional success they enjoyed during the Swing Era. College jazz programs revitalized the dying style.

By 1970 there were more than 450 college jazz bands and by 1980 there were over 500,000 high school and college students involved in jazz activities. The influx of student musicians brought about by formalized jazz education suddenly provided academic institutions with the numbers necessary to create their own big bands. Big bands also serve a very important pedagogical purpose. These bands enable educators to access a greater number of students at the same time.

In 1967, as the number of college jazz bands was increasing at a rapid rate, a new ensemble was formed at Mount Hood Community College. This ensemble took big band repertoire and set it for choir. Genesis became the first jazz choir. The creation of the vocal jazz ensemble is indicative of the direction of jazz education. Educators searching for new ways to make the music accessible turned to fusing different styles. The vocal jazz ensemble combines the classical traditions of Western Art Music, the vocal and instrumental traditions of jazz, and the pedagogical influence of jazz education.

== Controversy in jazz education ==
"The topic of jazz education has produced controversy since its beginnings. Many scholars avoid the subject almost entirely in their publications on jazz. Ted Gioia’s The History of Jazz makes virtually no mention of music schools, nor does Ken Burns’s ten-part PBS documentary. Gary Giddins’s 2004 collection Weather Bird consists of 146 short essays ... Giddins never broaches the topic of jazz education." The standardization of the jazz repertoire by early educators, such as Jamey Aebersold, drew criticism for the narrow lens with which it approached jazz education. Many feel that setting jazz to regimented structures and scales removes feeling from the music. Some also argue that this new style of jazz education is too focused on the individual musician. Classes and lessons have replaced jam sessions, which served as the major form of jazz education for the first half of the twentieth century. Jam sessions forced musicians to learn from one another to develop technique and vocabulary. Critics of formalized jazz education denounce the new emphasis put on learning music from sheet music instead of by ear. Books such as the Charlie Parker Omnibook, which is a particularly popular publication, are denounced for the quality of student they produce. In response, jazz educators point to the revitalized interest in jazz music and the high quality of musicians now playing jazz music. On top of this, standardization of jazz techniques is an event that occurred before the introduction of institutionalized jazz education. Arrangers and instrumentalists alike developed techniques that became standard practice.

== Jazz education organizations ==
Since the rise of jazz in academia, many institutions have sought to bring a unified face to jazz education. One of the largest of these groups was known as the International Association for Jazz Education, which scheduled regular conferences in cities across the world. The IAJE, however declared bankruptcy in April 2008. A new organization that has come to the fore is known as the Jazz Education Network, the website for which can be found at the Jazz Education Network Website. JEN was founded by Mary Jo Papich and Lou Fischer in 2008. The organization holds an annual conference each year as well as sponsoring other festivals.

== Notes ==
Works cited

- Ake, David Andrew. Rethinking Jazz Education. University of California Press (2010), pps. 102–120; OCLC 5104910703
- Dapogny, James. "Louis Armstrong." The New Grove Dictionary of Jazz (2nd ed.) (2001): n. pag. Oxford Music Online. Web. 23 April 2011
- Ellington, Edward Kennedy (Duke). "The Music is 'Tops' to You and Me ... And Swing is a Part of It." Tops (1938), pps. 14–18; OCLC 41525299, 29826820, 34593838
- Fitzgerald, Michael (born 1993). "Lenox School of Jazz" (jazzdiscography.com). N.p., n.d. Web. 23 April 2012
- Galper, Hal. "Crisis." N.p., n.d. Web. 23 Apr. 2012
- Galper, Hal. "Pedagogy." n.d. Web. 23 Apr. 2012
- Gioia, Ted. The history of jazz. Oxford University Press (1997); OCLC 36245922
- Gridley, Mark C. Jazz Styles: History & Analysis. (3rd ed.), Prentice-Hall (1988); OCLC 16472505
- "Jazz Education." Jazz in America. N.p., n.d. (retrieved April 23, 2012)
- "Jazz Education Guide: Collegiate Jazz Programs." JazzTimes (retrieved April 23, 2012)
- Kennedy, Gary W. "Jazz Education." The New Grove Dictionary (2nd ed.) (2001), n. pag.; OCLC 872313289: Oxford Music Online. Web. 23 April 2011
- Kirchner, Bill, and Charles Beale. "Jazz Education." The Oxford Companion to Jazz. Oxford University Press (2000), pps. 756–766; OCLC 42980245
- "Mt. Hood Genesis Vocal Jazz Ensemble." The Jazz Education Network. N.p., n.d. (retrieved April 25, 2012)
- Scott, Philip Allen, Jazz Educated, man; a sound foundation, American International Publishers (1973), pg. 19; OCLC 624548 LCCN 73-159620
- Shipton, Alyn. A New History of jazz. Continuum (2001); OCLC 45338600
- Thibeault, M.D. (2022) Aebersold’s Mediated Play-A-Long Pedagogy and the Invention of the Beginning Jazz Improvisation Student. Journal of Research in Music Education, https://doi.org/10.1177%2F00224294211031894
- Worthy, Michael D. "Jazz Education." The Grove Dictionary of American Music (2nd ed.) (2013), n. pag.; OCLC 774021205: Oxford Music Online. Web. 23 April 2011
