= National Anthems of the World =

National Anthems Of The World

Studio album by Stan Kenton Orchestra
- Released: 1972
- Recorded: August 25, 28, 29, 30 & 31, 1972
- Studio: Recorded at Western Recorders, Hollywood, California, United States
- Genre: Jazz, Big band, National anthems
- Length: 66:43
- Label: Creative World Records, GNP Crescendo
- Producer: Robert Curnow

Stan Kenton Orchestra chronology
Live at Butler University (1972)	National Anthems Of The World (1972)	Birthday in Britain (1973)

National Anthems Of The World is the first studio album by American jazz musician Stan Kenton and his orchestra under the Creative World label, released late 1972. Recording sessions for the album took place at Western Recorders, August 25, 28, 29, 30 & 31, 1972 in Hollywood, California.

== Background ==
When the Kenton band was summoned to the studio in late August 1972, Kenton was emphatic about recording a double album: National Anthems of the World. He had been convinced to complete this project by his perception of the previous success of Bob Curnow's arrangement of God Save the Queen played on two tours of the United Kingdom in late 1963 and an altered version earlier in 1972. Curnow had worked on the charts in batches during the spring of 1972 and delivered them while the band was out on the road. The band would hopefully have a good look the manuscripts by the time they would get in the studio in August.

Many agree that so much talent, enthusiasm and money would have been better spent on more promising jazz material than national anthems. Much like the Kenton/Wagner recording project of 1964, Kenton hoped the unique and striking 1972 project would accrue prestige and international recognition. The album was even sent to embassies all over the world. While there were many favorable replies, some were quite surprisingly negative to the extent the government of China bitterly resented their anthem featured on the same LP as arch-enemy Taiwan. Kenton himself would later lament, "The National Anthems album Bob wrote was great, though commercially it died---it was a terrible failure."

== Reception ==
Professional ratings
Review scores
Source	Rating
Virgin Encyclopedia of Jazz	2/4 stars

== Track listing ==
No.	Title	Writer(s)	Length
1.	"Germany"	Joseph Haydn	2:09
2.	"Wales"	Hen Wlad Fy Nhadau	1:34
3.	"Holland"	Wilhilmus Van Nassouwe	1:38
4.	"Guinea (Liberte)"		1:44
5.	"Italy ([Inno Di Mameli)"	Michele Novaro	1:48
6.	"Bulgaria (Dear Fatherland)"		1:36
7.	"Japan (Kimi Ga Yo)"	Hayashi Hirokami	2:25
8.	"Luxembourg (Ons Hemecht)"	Jean-Antoine Zinnen	1:28
9.	"Czechoslovakia (Part I: Kde Domoj Muj) (Part 2: Nad Tatru Sa Blyska)"		2:52
10.	"Ghana (Lift High The Flag Of Ghana)"		1:37
11.	"Canada (O Canada)"	Calixa Lavallée	1:49
12.	"Belgium (La Brabanconne)"	Francois van Campenhout	1:20
13.	"Austria (Osterreichische Bundeshymne)"	Francois van Campenhout	1:20
14.	"Denmark (Kong Kristian)"		1:23
15.	"India (Jana Gana Mana Adhinayak)"	Rabindranath Tagore	1:27
16.	"Poland (Hymn Polski)"	Michał Kleofas Ogiński	1:21
17.	"Iceland (Lofsongur)"		1:54
18.	"Korea (Ae Kuk Ga)"		1:27
19.	"An American Trilogy - Dixie, Battle Hymn Of The Republic, America The Beautiful"	Daniel Decatur Emmett, William Steffe, Samuel Augustus Ward	3:25
20.	"Great Britain (God Save The Queen)"		1:07
21.	"Hungary (Himnusz)"	Ferencz Erkel	3:29
22.	"Venezuela (Himno Nacionale)"	Juan Jose Landaeta	1:16
23.	"Finland (Maamme)"	Fredrik Pacius	1:13
24.	"Sweden (Du Gamia, Du Fria)"	Richard Dybeck	1:28
25.	"Peru (Himno Nacionale)"	Jose B. Alcedo	3:07
26.	"Nationalist China (Taiwan) (San Min Chu I)"	Cheng Mao-Yun	1:23
27.	"Greece (Hymne National)"	Nicholas Manzaros	1:22
28.	"Norway (Ja, Vi Elsker Dette Landet)"	Rikard Nordraak	1:19
29.	"Chile (Himno Nacional)"	Ramon Canicer	2:18
30.	"France (La Marseillaise)"	Claude Joseph Rouget de Lisle	1:26
31.	"Israel (Hatikvah)"	Naftali Herz Imber	2:12
32.	"Union Of Soviet Socialist Republics (Gimn Sovyetskovo Soyuza)"	Alexander Alexandrov	1:27
33.	"Switzerland (Schweizerpsalm)"		1:36
34.	"Burma (We Shall Love Burma Evermore)"	Th Kin Ba Thoung	1:41
35.	"Ireland (Amhran Na BhFiann)"	Patrick Heaney	1:33
36.	"Spain (Himno Nacional)"		2:02
37.	"People's Republic Of China (Chung-Ha-Jen-Min Gung-Ho Guo)"	Nie Er	1:44
38.	"Portugal (Hino Nacional A Portuguesa)"	Aldredo Keil	1:26
39.	"United States Of America (The Star Spangled Banner)"	John Stafford Smith, Francis Scott Key	2:10

All selections arranged and orchestrated by Robert Curnow

== Personnel ==
=== Musicians ===
- Alto Saxophone and flute – Quin Davis
- Tenor Saxophone and flute – Chris Galuman, Richard Torres
- Baritone Saxophone and flute – Chuck Carter (2), Willie Maiden
- Trumpet – Dennis Noday, Jay Saunders, Mike Snustead, Mike Vax, Ray Brown
- Trombone – Dick Shearer, Fred Carter, Harvey Coonin, Mike Wallace, Phil Herring
- Afro-Latin percussion – Ramon Lopez
- Piano – Stan Kenton
- Bass – John Worster
- Drums – Peter Erskine

=== Production ===
- Producer – Bob Curnow
- Arranged By – Robert Curnow
- Artwork – Young And Dodge
- Engineer and Mixed – Don Sears
- Photography By – Harold Plant

== Bibliography ==
- Easton, Carol (1973). "Straight Ahead: The Story of Stan Kenton". New York, N.Y.: William Morrow & Company, INC.
- Sparke, Michael (2010). "Stan Kenton: This Is An Orchestra". Denton, TX: University of North Texas Press.
- Sparke, Michael (1998). "Stan Kenton: The Studio Sessions". Lake Geneva, WI: Balboa Books.
- Lee, William F. (1980). "Stan Kenton: Artistry in Rhythm". Los Angeles, CA: Creative Press.
- Harris, Steven D. (2000). "The Stan Kenton Kronicles". Pasadena, CA: Dynaflow Publications.
- Cook, Richard (2002). "The Penguin Guide To Jazz On CD (6th Edition)". London, England: Penguin Books.
