= Charlie Parker Omnibook =

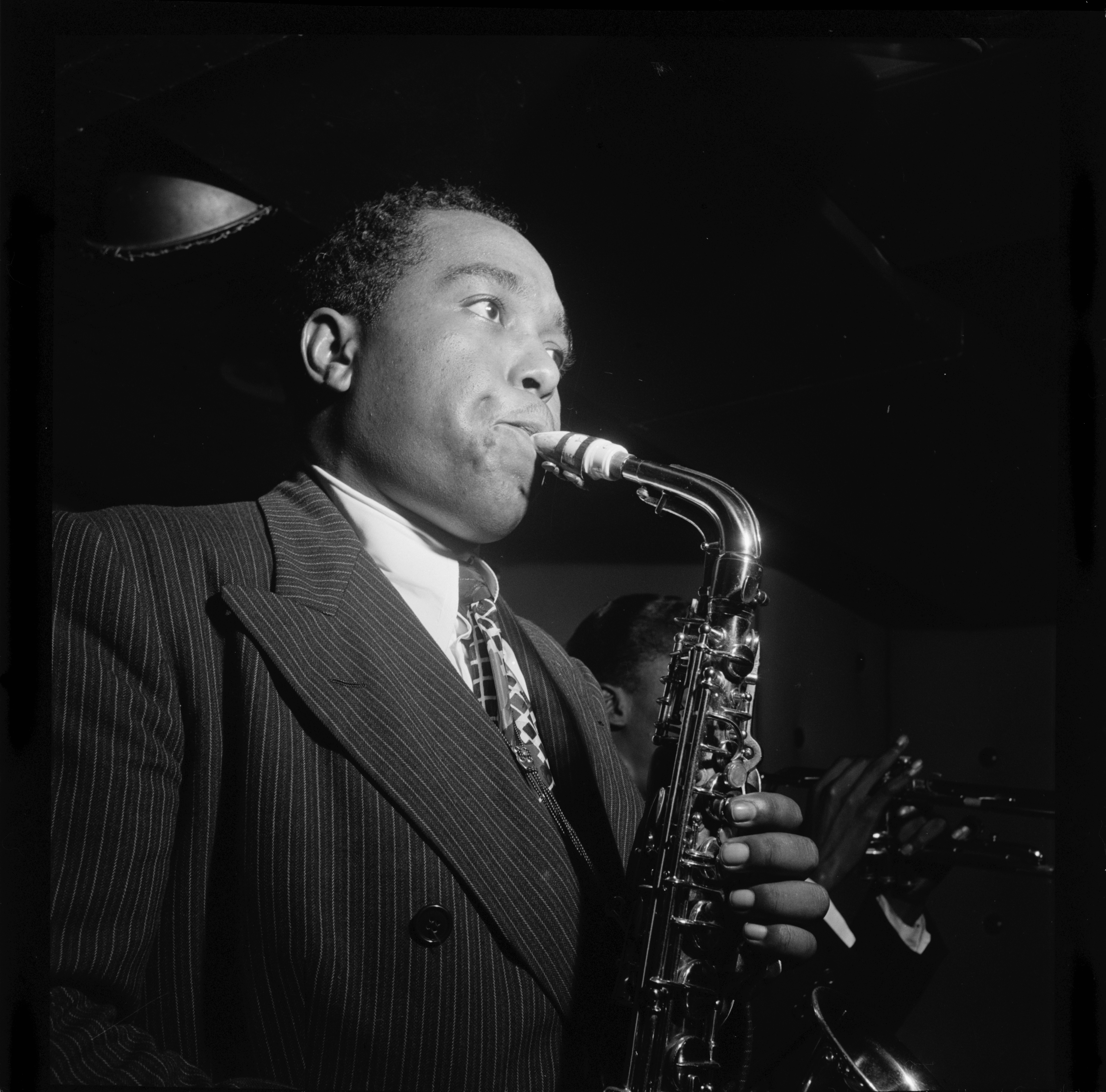
Jazz saxophonist and composer Charlie Parker

The Charlie Parker Omnibook is a collection of transcriptions of compositions and improvised solos by jazz saxophonist Charlie Parker. It is available for E-flat, B-flat, C and bass-clef instruments. It includes 60 pieces, transcribed by Ken Slone with proofreading assistance from Jamey Aebersold, information about the records, and practice suggestions. The Charlie Parker Omnibook is published by Hal Leonard LLC.

Charlie Parker (1920–1955) was one of the pioneers of the Bebop style of jazz. This idiom is characterized by fast tempos, instrumental virtuosity, and improvisation over set harmonic structures. Parker’s style of playing and his harmonic treatment particularly in improvisation continues to be influential across multiple genres and instruments. In particular, he innovated rapid passing chords, new variants of altered chords, and chord substitutions. His realization that the 12 notes of the chromatic scale can lead melodically to any key led to him escaping from the confines of previously practiced improvisation methods.

The Omnibook has become a major reference for students of jazz improvisation in many genres of jazz music not just bebop. Portions of Parker’s improvised solos continue to be quoted by other improvising jazz musicians today. The transcriptions are not intended to be studied by saxophonists new to the instrument but rather by advanced students with some prior jazz idiom knowledge and considerable instrumental skill. Very few articulation marks are notated.

== Transcriptions included in the book ==
- Ah-Leu-Cha
- Another Hairdo
- Anthropology (composition)
- Au Privave
- Au Privave (No. 2)
- Back Home Blues
- Ballade (Parker C)
- Barbados
- Billie's Bounce (Bill's Bounce)
- The Bird
- Bird Gets the Worm (Parker)
- Bloomdido
- Blue Bird
- Blues (Fast)
- Blues for Alice
- Buzzy
- Card Board
- Celerity (Parker)
- Chasing The Bird
- Cheryl
- Chi Chi
- Confirmation
- Constellation
- Cosmic Rays
- Dewey Square
- Diverse (Parker)
- Donna Lee
- K.C. Blues
- Kim
- Kim (No. 2)
- Klaunstance
- Ko-Ko
- Laird Baird
- Leap Frog (Parker C)
- Marmaduke
- Merry Go Round (Parker C)
- Mohawk
- Mohawk (No. 2)
- Moose the Mooche
- My Little Suede Shoes
- Now's The Time
- Now's The Time (No. 2)
- Ornithology
- An Oscar For Treadwell
- Parker's Mood
- Passport
- Perhaps
- Red Cross
- Relaxing With Lee (Parker)
- Scrapple from the Apple
- Segment
- Shawnuff
- She Rote
- She Rote (No. 2)
- Si Si
- Steeplechase
- Thriving From A Riff
- Visa
- Warming Up A Riff (Parker)
- Yardbird Suite
