= Dick Shearer =

American jazz trombonist (1940–1997)

Richard Bruce Shearer (September 21, 1940 – September 20, 1997) was an American jazz trombonist.

== Career ==
Shearer was lead trombonist and music director for the Stan Kenton Orchestra. He succeeded Jim Trimble in the late 1960s, led the band during Kenton's illnesses, and produced several of its albums. He remained with the band until Kenton's death in 1979. For the next three years, Shearer was director of jazz bands at Wayne State University in Detroit.

In soft ensemble passages (such as the Dee Barton arrangement of "Here's That Rainy Day"), Shearer plays softly, achieving an orchestral pianissimo; this technique allows the later ensemble climax to seem even more powerful. Shearer also championed what is referred to as the "breath attack", where repeated notes (usually in a ballad) are not tongued, but are given an extra "push" of air.

Mike Vax, lead trumpeter of the Stan Kenton Orchestra, said, "Dick Shearer was the most important person on the band. I think that Stan felt about him like a son...the way Dick played trombone, that was the Kenton sound. Dick's trombone was derivative of all the great Kenton lead players, going all the way back to Kai Winding. But sometimes the person who's the end of a legacy becomes the culmination of the legacy, so I think Dick was the greatest lead trombone player of them all."

== Discography ==
=== As leader ===
- Dick Shearer and His Stan Kenton Spirits (Americatone, 1992)

=== As sideman ===
With Stan Kenton

- The World We Know (Capitol, 1967)
- The Jazz Compositions of Dee Barton (Capitol, 1968)
- Finian's Rainbow (Capitol, 1968)
- Hair (Capitol, 1969)
- Live at Redlands University (Creative World, 1970)
- Live at Brigham Young University (Creative World, 1971)
- Live at Butler University (Creative World, 1972)
- Stan Kenton Today: Recorded Live in London (London, 1972)
- National Anthems of the World (Creative World, 1972)
- 7.5 on the Richter Scale (Creative World, 1973)
- Birthday in Britain (Creative World, 1973)
- Fire, Fury & Fun (Creative World, 1974)
- Stan Kenton Plays Chicago (Creative World, 1974)
- Journey Into Capricorn (Creative World, 1976)
- Kenton '76 (Creative World, 1976)
- Live in Europe (Decca, 1977)
- Street of Dreams (Creative World, 1979)
- Rhapsody in Blue (Moon, 1989)
- Artistry in Symphonic Jazz (Tantara, 1991)
- Live at the Sunset Ridge Country Club 1976 (Magic, 1992)
- Live at the Sunset Ridge Country Club 1976 Part 2 (Magic, 1992)
- Cologne 76 Part One (Magic, 1993)
- Cologne 76 Part Two (Magic, 1993)
- Live at Carthage College Part One (Magic, 1994)
- Live at Carthage College Part Two (Magic, 1994)
- Live at the London Hilton 1973 Vol. 1 (Status, 1994)
- Live at the London Hilton 1973 Vol. 2 (Status, 1994)
- At Fountain Street Church Part 2 (Status, 1995)
- At Fountain Street Church Part I (Status, 1995)
- At the Pavilion Hemel Hempstead England 1973 (Status, 1996)
- The British Tour 1973 (Magic, 1998)
- Live at the Newport Jazz Festival from the Philharmonic Hall Lincoln Centre New York 3 July 1972 (Jazz Band, 1999)
- Kenton Roars at the Golden Lion (Tantara, 2014)

With others

- Chad & Jeremy, 3 in the Attic (Sidewalk, 1968))
- The Four Freshmen with Stan Kenton, Live at Butler University (Creative World, 1972)
- Denise LaSalle, I'm So Hot (MCA, 1980)
- Denise LaSalle, Guaranteed (MCA, 1981)
- Mark Masters, Silver Threads Among the Blues (Sea Breeze, 1986)
- The Righteous Brothers, Righteous Brothers (Verve, 1966)
- The Righteous Brothers, Soul & Inspiration (Verve, 1966)
