= Touchstone for Manu =

Compilation album by Manu Katché
- Released: August 15, 2014
- Recorded: November 2004, January 2007, December 2009 and March 2012
- Studio: Rainbow Studio (Oslo); Avatar Studios (NYC); Studios la Buissonne (P-l-F)
- Genre: Jazz
- Length: 58:52
- Label: ECM; ECM 2419
- Producer: Manfred Eicher

Professional ratings
Review scores
Source	Rating
All Music	4/5 stars

Touchstone for Manu is a jazz compilation album by Manu Katché released on ECM in August 2014.

== Reception ==
John Kelman in his review for All About Jazz says that "Touchstone for Manu puts a very fine period on an eight-year run that positioned Katché as a strong bandleader, an accessible composer... and a drummer whose focus on groove and group interplay over chops and excessive gymnastics remains both refreshing and relevant."

== Track listing ==
All music is composed by Manu Katché

No.	Title	Original release	Length
1.	"Song for Her"	Playground	6:31
2.	"Number One"	Neighbourhood	6:13
3.	"Take off and Land"	Neighbourhood	4:02
4.	"So Groovy"	Playground	5:52
5.	"Morning Joy"	Playground	5:29
6.	"Keep on Trippin'"	Third Round	5:32
7.	"Senses"	Third Round	4:12
8.	"Swing Piece"	Third Round	4:50
9.	"Running After Years"	Third Round	6:16
10.	"Slowing the Tides"	Manu Katché	5:35
11.	"Bliss"	Manu Katché	4:20
Total length:			58:52

== Personnel ==
- Manu Katché – drums
- Jan Garbarek – tenor saxophone
- Tomasz Stanko – trumpet
- Marcin Wasilewski – piano
- Slawomir Kurkiewicz – double bass
- Trygve Seim – tenor saxophone
- Mathias Eick – trumpet
- Jacob Young – guitar
- Pino Palladino – bass
- Jason Rebello – piano
- Jim Watson – piano, Hammond B3 organ
- Tore Brunborg – saxophone, tenor saxophone
- Nils Petter Molvaer – trumpet, loops
