= Manu Katché =

French drummer and songwriter (born 1958)

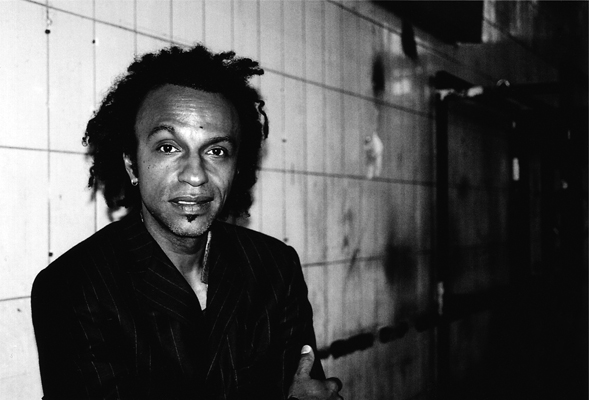

Background information
- Born: 27 October 1958 (age 67); Saint-Maur-des-Fossés, France
- Genres: Jazz; rock
- Occupations: Musician; songwriter; television host
- Instruments: Drums; talking drum; piano; percussion
- Website: manu-katche.com

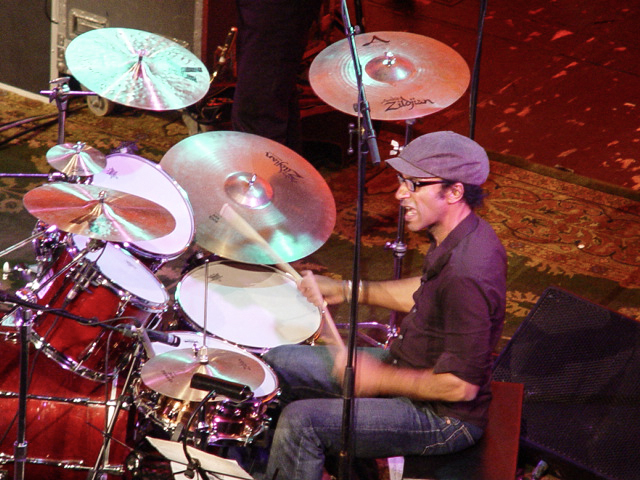
Manu Katché (Copenhagen Jazz Festival 2007)

Manu Katché (born 27 October 1958) is a French drummer and songwriter of Ivorian descent. He has worked extensively as a session musician, notably with Sting and Peter Gabriel, and his solo albums as a bandleader are largely in the jazz fusion style.

== Career ==
=== Session musician ===
Katché was born on 27 October 1958 in Saint-Maur-des-Fossés in the southeastern suburbs of Paris, France. He performed on several successful albums in the mid-1980s such as Peter Gabriel's 1986 album So and Sting's …Nothing Like the Sun (1987) and The Soul Cages (1991). Since then, he has been featured in the pop, rock and world music scenes, playing with numerous artists and bands, including: Afro Celt Sound System, Jeff Beck, Al Di Meola, Tears for Fears, Eurythmics, Simple Minds, Dire Straits, Laurent Voulzy, Jeanne Mas, Joni Mitchell, Mike Lindup, Jan Garbarek, Claudio Baglioni, Mango, Manu Chao, Loreena McKennitt, Youssou N'Dour, Robbie Robertson, Pino Daniele, Joan Armatrading, Joe Satriani, Tori Amos, Richard Wright, Kyle Eastwood, the Christians, Ryuichi Sakamoto, Tracy Chapman, Dominic Miller and the aforementioned Peter Gabriel and Sting, with whom he has also toured extensively. Manu has also worked with Zlatan Stipišić Gibonni, a Croatian singer and songwriter, on his albums Mirakul (2001) and Unca Fibre (2006), and has toured with Gibonni supporting the two albums.

=== With Preface ===
From 1985 to 1988 he was in the band Preface, with guitar player Kamil Rustam and keyboardist Jean-Yves D'Angelo.

=== Solo ===
In 1991, Katché released his first solo album, It's About Time, largely in the pop genre, with guest musicians like Daniel Lanois, David Rhodes, Peter Gabriel, David Sancious, Branford Marsalis and Sting. His subsequent solo releases have all been jazz. He released his second solo album on 12 September 2005 entitled Neighbourhood, which features Jan Garbarek on saxophone, Tomasz Stańko on trumpet, Marcin Wasilewski on piano and Slawomir Kurkiewicz on double bass. His second ECM album, Playground was released in September 2007. In March 2010, Katché released Third Round, again on ECM.

From 2003 to 2007, along with producer Dove Attia, composer André Manoukian and singer Marianne James, he was one of the four judges in the TV-show Nouvelle Star, the French version of the Idol series. He was the most feared judge for his wit and his severe judgment about the groove, rhythm and tempo of the singing contestants.

Since January 2008, Katché has hosted the monthly program One Shot Not on Arte.

In 2010 Katché composed the instrumental music for the six themed lands of the Belgian theme park Bellewaerde. An album, with the twelve compositions for the park, including music for the Mexican, western, Indian and Canadian areas, was sold in souvenir shops at the park.

In August 2011 the album Rock the Tabla was released, featuring Manu Katché, Billy Cobham, A.R. Rahman, Hossam Ramzy and Omar Faruk Tekbilek.

== Discography ==
=== Solo albums ===
- It's About Time (BMG, 1992)
- Neighbourhood (ECM, 2005)
- Playground (ECM, 2007)
- Third Round (ECM, 2010)
- Manu Katché (ECM, 2012)
- Live in Concert (ACT, 2014)
- Touchstone for Manu (ECM, 2014)
- Unstatic (Anteprima, 2016)
- The Scope (Anteprima, 2019)

=== Participations ===
With Tori Amos

- Boys for Pele (1996)

With Claudio Baglioni

- Oltre (1990)

With Jeff Beck

- Who Else! (1999)

With Bee Gees

- Still Waters (1997)

With Louis Bertignac

- Elle et Louis (1993)

With Francis Cabrel

- Sarbacane (1989)
- Samedi Soir Sur La Terre (1994)
- Hors-Saison (1999)

With Tracy Chapman

- Matters of the Heart (1992)

With Dire Straits

- On Every Street (1991)

With Peter Gabriel

- So (1986)
- Passion (1989), Soundtrack
- Shaking the Tree: Sixteen Golden Greats (1990), Compilation
- PoV (1990), Concert Video Album
- Us (1992)
- Secret World Live (1994)
- OVO (2000), Soundtrack
- Up (2002)
- Long Walk Home: Music from the Rabbit-Proof Fence (2002)
- Hit (2003), Compilation
- Play: The Videos (2004)
- Still Growing Up: Live and Unwrapped (2005)
- Back to Front: Live in London (2014)
- i/o (2023)

With Jan Garbarek

- Ragas and Sagas (ECM, 1990)
- I Took Up the Runes (ECM, 1990)
- Twelve Moons (ECM, 1992)
- Visible World (ECM, 1995)
- In Praise of Dreams (ECM, 2003)
- Dresden: In Concert (ECM, 2009)

With Herbie Hancock

- The Imagine Project

With Nigel Kennedy

- Kafka (1996)

With Pino Daniele

- Non calpestare i fiori nel deserto (1995)

With Tony Levin

- World Diary (1996)

With Michael McDonald

- Blink of an Eye (1993)

With Loreena McKennitt

- The Book of Secrets (1997)
- An Ancient Muse (2006)

With Dominic Miller

- Absinthe (ECM, 2019)

With Joni Mitchell

- Chalk Mark in a Rain Storm (1988)
- compiled in:
  - Misses (1996)
  - The Beginning of Survival (2004)
  - Dreamland (2004)
  - Songs of a Prairie Girl (2005)

With Robbie Robertson

- Robbie Robertson (1987)

With Joe Satriani

- Joe Satriani (1995)
- The Electric Joe Satriani: An Anthology (2003)

With Simple Minds

- Street Fighting Years (1989)

With Sting

- ...Nothing Like the Sun (1987)
- The Soul Cages (1991)
- Brand New Day (1999)
- All This Time (2001)
- At the Movies (2002)
- Sacred Love (2003)
- The Bridge (2021)

With Tears for Fears

- The Seeds of Love (1989)

With Richard Wright

- Broken China (1996)

With Paul Young

- Other Voices (1990)
