= Wakala (roller coaster) =

Steel roller coaster at Bellewaerde

Bellewaerde
- Location: Bellewaerde
- Park section: Canada
- Coordinates: 50.849000°N 2.947476°E
- Status: Operating
- Opening date: July 1, 2020; 5 years ago
- Cost: €7,500,000

General statistics
- Type: Steel – Family
- Manufacturer: Gerstlauer
- Height: 68.9 ft (21.0 m)
- Length: 2,165.4 ft (660.0 m)
- Speed: 31.1 mph (50.1 km/h)
- Inversions: 0
- Capacity: 1000 riders per hour
- Height restriction: 100 cm (3 ft 3 in)
- Trains: 3 trains with 10 cars. Riders are arranged 2 across in a single row for a total of 20 riders per train.
- Lift System #1: Chain lift hill
- Lift System #2: Drive tire
- Website: Official website
- Single rider line Available
- Wakala at RCDB

Video

Wakala is a steel family roller coaster located at Bellewaerde near Ypres, Belgium. The coaster pays heavy homage to the Kwakwakaʼwakw natives of the Canadian Pacific Northwest. It is manufactured by Gerstlauer and is targeted at families, with two lift hills, a meandering layout, and a vertical spike rollback element.

== History ==
On February 15, 2019, Bellewaerde officials submitted a building application to build a major new family roller coaster in and around the park's Canada zone. The ride layout had already been designed, with applications stating that it would be provided by a "renowned manufacturer". Following concern for the surrounding environment from local authorities, the park withdrew the permit before an objection could be filed. Working closely with the local Nature and Forest Agency, the park later resubmitted plans further detailing the environmental impact and how they would compensate for any trees felled. The project received final approval in September 2019.

Land clearing began immediately following approval, and track would begin arriving in and around early January 2020. On January 28, with much of the ride already constructed, Bellewaerde formally announced Wakala on the ride's construction site, to great fanfare from park guests and media crews alike. The coaster, at a cost of €7,500,000, would represent the park's largest attraction investment since 1999 and be tailored towards all members of the family, thus featuring a unique exciting layout complete with a backwards spike. Concept artwork of the ride's layout and trains were also made publicly available as promotional material, as well as a targeted opening date during the spring of 2020.

The coaster was "90% [ready] in early March", according to Bellewaerde general manager Stefaan Lemey, but the COVID-19 pandemic forced the park to delay their park opening from their projected April 4, 2020 opening day. After securing approval, Bellewaerde reopened on July 1, 2020, and Wakala opened to the public after a media event the day prior.

== Characteristics ==
=== Statistics ===
Wakala has a total advertised track length of 2,165.4 feet (660.0 m) and reaches family-friendly speeds of up to 31.1 mph (50.1 km/h). An exact max height figure has been disputed by multiple sources, as RCDB lists it as 68.9 feet (21.0 m), whereas ride manufacturer Gerstlauer states it to be 62.3 feet (19.0 m). The coaster utilizes two lift hills throughout the layout; the first uses a chain lift while the second uses drive tires/flywheels.

=== Theme ===
Wakala is themed to the Kwakwakaʼwakw Indigenous peoples of the Pacific Northwest, in British Columbia and Vancouver Island, Canada. The ride area is covered with lush greenery and Kwakwakaʼwakw art. Browns and greens make up the attraction's overall color palette, with much of the queue and station being constructed out of wood. It is thus located in the park's Canada area.

=== Trains ===
Wakala has three trains with 10 cars each; each of these cars is able to seat a single row of two riders, for a total of 20 passengers per train. The trains are elaborately themed to the people's iconic dugout canoes.

=== Contractors ===
Wakala was designed and manufactured by Gerstlauer, who in past years had worked with Bellewaerde wonder Compagnie des Alpes on coasters at some of their other parks, including Tiki-Waka (2018) at Walibi Belgium and Mystic (2019) at Walibi Rhône-Alpes. Numerous local firms, most notably Blemish construction company De Wandeler, were involved in the attraction's construction.

== Ride experience ==
Upon dispatch from the station, riders immediately ascend a 56.3-foot (17.2 m) chain lift hill. Once at the top, riders turn over and drop under the existing Dawson Duel racing coasters, navigating a trip of elevated airtime hills in the direction of the Bellewaerde pond. Once at the water, the train makes an abrupt right-hand turn and speed through a bunny hill and left-hand turnaround, followed by a series of twists and turns, including another jump over a park pathway. After speeding through a turnaround encompassing the ride queue, the train enters the second lift hill, which is powered by drive tires, with reasonable speed. Riders plunge into a curved drop and speed through the brake run towards the water, navigating a trick-track section before rolling out onto the pond and up the spike element, similar to those seen on Schwarzkopf Shuttle Loop coasters. The train loses speed, as intended, before rolling back through the switchback and into the brake run. A switch-track leads the coaster into a final holding brake area directly outside of the station.
