= Faithful (Marcin Wasilewski album) =

Studio album by Marcin Wasilewski
- Released: April 21, 2011
- Recorded: August 2010
- Studio: Auditorio Radiotelevisione svizzera, Lugano
- Genre: Jazz
- Length: 71:45
- Label: ECM; ECM 2208
- Producer: Manfred Eicher

Marcin Wasilewski chronology
January (2007)	Faithful (2011)	Spark of Life (2014)

Faithful is an album by Polish jazz pianist and composer Marcin Wasilewski recorded in 2010 and released on the ECM label.

== Reception ==
Professional ratings
Review scores
Source	Rating
The Guardian	4/5 stars
All About Jazz	4.5/5 stars

In JazzTimes Brent Burton wrote "Turn it up loud or turn it down low; either way, it’s one of the best piano-trio recordings you’ll hear this year". The Guardian;s critic John Fordham observed: "Like their earlier ECM albums Trio and January, Faithful is predominantly pensive, but the trio are vivacious even while dreamwalking". For All About Jazz, John Kelman wrote: "Wasilewski may be the titular leader, and contribute all the original material, but Faithful clearly relies entirely on the strength of a collective for whom lyricism is paramount, regardless of the context—direct and driven or implicit and suggestive, but always placing the whole as the objective beyond its individual contributing voices".

== Track listing ==
All compositions by Marcin Wasilewski, except where indicated.

1. "An Den Kleinen Radioapparat" (Hanns Eisler) - 4:30
2. "Night Train to You" - 10:41
3. "Faithful" (Ornette Coleman) - 7:16
4. "Mosaic" - 10:34
5. "Ballad of the Sad Young Men" (Fran Landesman, Tommy Wolf) - 5:29
6. "Oz Guizos" (Hermeto Pascoal) - 6:32
7. "Song for Swirek" - 8:14
8. "Woke Up in the Desert" - 5:32
9. "Big Foot" (Paul Bley) - 6:21
10. "Lugano Lake" - 6:33

== Personnel ==
- Marcin Wasilewski - piano
- Slawomir Kurkiewicz - bass
- Michal Miskiewicz - drums
