= It's About Time (Manu Katché album) =

Studio album by Manu Katché
- Released: January 1992
- Genre: Jazz, Funk, Jazz fusion
- Label: BMG
- Producer: Philippe Abitbol

Manu Katché chronology
It's About Time (1992)	Neighbourhood (2005)

Professional ratings
Review scores
Source	Rating
Allmusic	4/5 stars

It's About Time is the first solo album released by session drummer Manu Katché. The musicians on the album are people Katché worked with as a session musician, including Sting, Peter Gabriel, and others.

== Track listing ==
All music composed by Katche

No.	Title	Lyrics	Length
1.	"Cry of Passion"	Katche / Robinson	5:01
2.	"Change"	Katche / Robinson	4:37
3.	"Warm Doorway"	Duez / Fisher / Katche	3:16
4.	"Who I Am"	Katche / Robinson	3:36
5.	"Go Getter"	Katche / Robinson	3:46
6.	"Lost in You"	Katche / Robinson	3:36
7.	"Silence"	Katche / Robinson	3:48
8.	"My Inner Heart"	Katche / Robinson	3:48
9.	"No Country"	Fisher / Katche / Robinson	4:38
10.	"She Is"	Katche / Robinson	4:41
11.	"25th of July"	Fisher / Katche / Robinson	4:35
12.	"Tell Me Why"	Katche / Robinson	2:34

== Personnel ==
- Manu Katché – vocals (all tracks), drums (tracks 1–5, 7–11), percussion (tracks 1, 3–9, 12), programming (tracks 6, 8–9)
- Pino Palladino – bass (tracks 1–11), handclaps (track 4), backing vocals (tracks 6, 9)
- John Paul Jones – bass (track 12)
- Daniel Lanois – guitar solo (tracks 1, 4), dobro (track 4)
- Dominic Miller – guitars (tracks 1, 5–7, 10–11)
- David Rhodes – guitars (tracks 2–6, 8–10), backing vocals (track 6)
- Chris Lawson – guitar (track 12)
- David Sancious – keyboards (tracks 1, 7, 11), piano (track 10)
- Roger Bolton – keyboards (tracks 1, 6, 8, 11)
- Simon Clark – horn arrangement (tracks 1, 4, 8), keyboards (tracks 1–10, 12), organ (tracks 2–4, 6), melodica (track 2), backing vocals (track 6)
- Richard Galliano – accordion, bandoneon (track 9)
- Branford Marsalis – saxophone (tracks 1, 7, 10)
- Stuart Brooks – horns (tracks 1, 4, 8)
- Guy Barker – horns (tracks 1, 4, 8)
- Pete Beachill – horns (tracks 1, 4, 8)
- Philip Todd – horns (tracks 1, 4, 8)
- Babacar Faye – djembe, sabar (track 9)
- Assane Thiam – talking drum (track 9)
- Dylan Acogny – handclaps (track 4)
- Lucile Katché – handclaps (track 4)
- Fabiana Palladino – handclaps (track 4)
- Tom Robinson – backing vocals (tracks 1–2, 4, 8, 11)
- Siobhan Maher – backing vocals (tracks 2, 4, 7)
- Peter Gabriel – guest vocals (tracks 3, 7) handclaps (track 4)
- Mandy Lesley – backing vocals (tracks 4, 8)
- Maz Roberts – backing vocals (tracks 4, 8–9) handclaps (track 4)
- Sting – guest vocals (tracks 7, 11)
- Sophie Duez – backing vocals (track 9), handclaps (track 4)
- Elisabeth Acogny – backing vocals (track 9), handclaps (track 4)
- George Acogny – backing vocals (track 9), handclaps (track 4)
- Richard Evans – backing vocals (track 9), handclaps (track 4)
- Laurent Voulzy – backing vocals (tracks 9–10), handclaps (track 4)
- Tammie Hanckock – backing vocals (track 9)
- Emma Jones – backing vocals (track 9)
- Philippe Abitbol – backing vocals (track 9), handclaps (track 4)
