= January (Marcin Wasilewski album) =

Studio album by the Marcin Wasilewski Trio
- Released: January 24, 2008
- Recorded: February 2007
- Studio: Avatar (New York, New York)
- Genre: Jazz
- Length: 70:45
- Label: ECM; ECM 2019
- Producer: Manfred Eicher

Marcin Wasilewski chronology
Trio (2004)	January (2008)	Faithful (2010)

January is an album by the Marcin Wasilewski Trio, recorded in February 2007 and released on ECM on January 24, 2008. The trio feature rhythm section Slawomir Kurkiewicz and Michal Miskiewicz.

== Reception ==
Professional ratings
Review scores
Source	Rating
Allmusic	4/5 stars
All About Jazz	4.5/5 stars
The Guardian	4/5 stars

The AllMusic review by Thom Jurek states, "This is terrific second effort by a band that, despite the fact that its members have been together for 17 years, is only really coming into its own in the present moment."

In JazzTimes Thomas Conrad wrote "It takes nerve for a young trio to create music of such stillness, such patience. The fact that these three have played together since they were teenagers is audible in the way they trust the epiphanies they collectively come upon. January is an album to keep coming back to, if not for new answers, then for deeper questions."

The Guardian critic John Fordham wrote "Part of the group's secret is the patient ease with which they intertwine impressionistic music and powerful pulses, and here Wasilewski's strong originals once again give much of the set its backbone."

On All About Jazz Chris May noted "While this lovely music comes out under Wasilewski's name, it is impossible to imagine it being made with any other bassist and drummer, so hard-wired are Kurkiewicz and Miskiewicz into a collective aesthetic. One day, hopefully long off, there may be partings, but until then, MWT are as perfect as it gets."

== Track listing ==
All tracks are written by Marcin Wasilewski, except as noted.

No.	Title	Writer(s)	Length
1.	"The First Touch"		4:13
2.	"Vignette"	Gary Peacock	8:08
3.	"Cinema Paradiso"	Ennio Morricone; Andrea Morricone	8:33
4.	"Diamonds and Pearls"	Prince Rogers Nelson	5:48
5.	"Balladyna"	Tomasz Stańko	6:46
6.	"King Korn"	Carla Bley	6:45
7.	"The Cat"		9:58
8.	"January"		8:38
9.	"The Young and Cinema"		9:10
10.	"New York 2007"	Wasilewski, Kurkiewicz, Miskiewicz	2:46

== Personnel ==
=== Marcin Wasilewski Trio ===
- Marcin Wasilewski – piano
- Slawomir Kurkiewicz – bass
- Michal Miskiewicz – drums
