= Spark of Life (album) =

Studio album by the Marcin Wasilewski Trio with Joakim Milder
- Released: October 7, 2014
- Recorded: March 2014
- Studios: Auditorio Radiotelevisione svizzera Lugano, Switzerland
- Genre: Jazz
- Length: 73:44
- Label: ECM 2400
- Producer: Manfred Eicher

Marcin Wasilewski chronology
Faithful (2010)	Spark of Life (2014)

Spark of Life is an album by the Marcin Wasilewski Trio with Joakim Milder recorded in March 2014 and released on ECM October later that year. The trio features rhythm section Slawomir Kurkiewicz and Michal Miskiewicz, with Milder on sax appearing on five tracks.

== Reception ==
Professional ratings
Review scores
Source	Rating
The Guardian	4/5 stars
All About Jazz	4.5/5 stars

In JazzTimes Jeff Tamarkin wrote, "Wasilewski and his compatriots habitually roll out one stately, even-tempered melody after the next, giving each plenty of simmer time before ultimately coming out the other side, regardless of what happens along the way, without having broken a sweat. (This is an ECM record, after all.)"

The Guardian's John Fordham observed, "It’s all right up to Wasilewski Trio standards, and Milder is a shadowy but fascinating presence."

On All About Jazz John Kelman observed, "Spark of Life is another stellar collection from a trio predicated on the value of longevity and leveraging the opportunities this now late-thirty-something trio has been afforded to build a language all its own ... With the addition of Milder on roughly half of this 74-minute program, the Marcin Wasilewski Trio has managed to retain its core strengths while adding something new to avoid any pitfalls of predictability."

== Track listing ==
All compositions by Marcin Wasilewski, except where indicated.

1. "Austin" - 7:07
2. "Sudovian" - 6:28
3. "Spark of Life" - 6:33
4. "Do Rycerzy, Do Szlachy, Do Mieszczan" (Pawel Krawczyk, Katarzyna Nosowska, Marcin Żabiełowicz) - 4:37
5. "Message in a Bottle" (Sting) - 7:36
6. "Sleep Safe and Warm" (Krzysztof Komeda) - 6:55
7. "Three Reflections" - 8:33
8. "Still" (Joakim Milder) - 6:44
9. "Actual Proof" (Herbie Hancock) - 6:05
10. "Largo" (Grażyna Bacewicz) - 8:05
11. "Spark of Life" - 5:01

== Personnel ==
=== Marcin Wasilewski Trio ===
- Marcin Wasilewski – piano
- Slawomir Kurkiewicz – bass
- Michal Miskiewicz – drums

=== Guest ===
- Joakim Milder – tenor saxophone (tracks 2–4, 6 & 8)
