= Bellewaerde =

Theme park in Zillebeke, West Flanders, Belgium

- Previously known as 1972 - 2013: Bellewaerde Park; 1969 - 1971: Safari Bellewaerde; 1954 - 1968: Touristic Center Bellewaerde

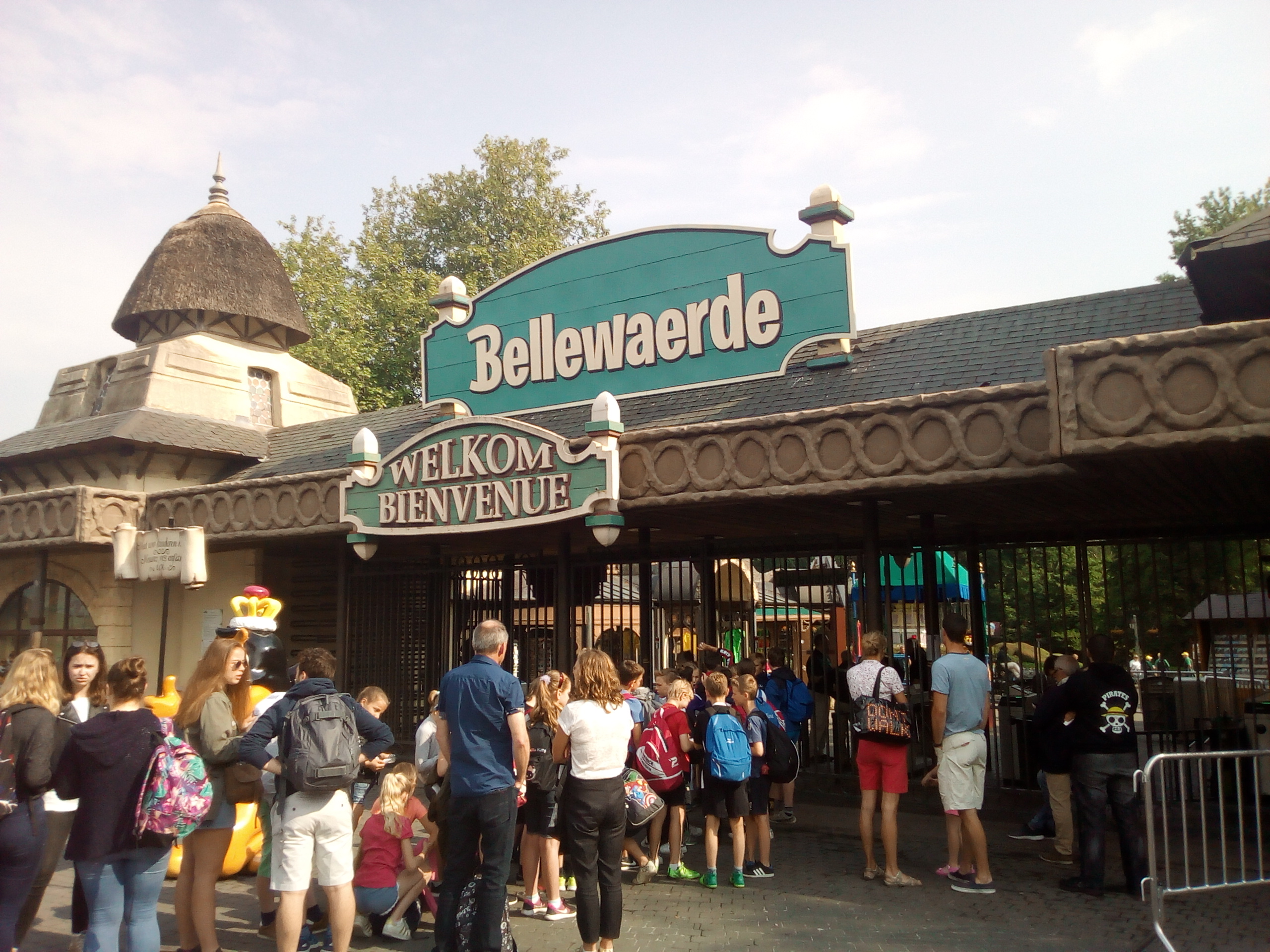
- Main Entrance, 2018
- Interactive map of Bellewaerde
- Location: Zillebeke, West Flanders, Belgium
- Coordinates: 50°50′54″N 2°56′44″E
- Opened: 1954
- Owner: Compagnie des Alpes
- Operating season: April - November
- Area: 134 acres (54 ha)

Attractions
- Total: 37 (as of 2023)
- Roller coasters: 4
- Website: www.bellewaerde.be

Bellewaerde is a theme park in the West Flemish countryside at Zonnebeke near Ypres, Belgium (it is physically located just inside the Ypres municipality boundary). It was established in 1954, on the grounds of the World War I Battle of Bellewaarde. Named after an old castle in its territory that still stands near the main entrance, Bellewaerde is the oldest operating theme park in Belgium. Originally a zoo and safari, the park expanded in the early eighties to become more of a general theme- and thrillpark, catering towards teens and families. The 54-hectare (130-acre) park is known for its beautiful gardens, marvelous landscaping and its attention to theming. Its mascotte is a lion dressed as a king, King Lion. Bellewaerde draws about 850,000 - 900,000 visitors a year and is the main theme park in Flanders.

Major rides include the first Boomerang coaster in Europe (1984), world's first Topple Tower from Huss(2005), Vekoma Mad House (Houdini's Magical House), a Zierer indoor coaster, a duelling Alpine Coaster, several water rides including a log flume, a river rapids ride and a spillwater ride, the Screaming Eagle vertical drop tower, various stock rides such as a pirate ship, a swing carousel, formerly an original Zierer beetle coaster, carousels, and an entertainment schedule that changes every year. Bellewaerde's additions since 2020 are a Gerstlauer family coaster, Wakala (2020), a barnyard, Psssht station (2023), a nebulaz, Hampi (2023), a Kids rollercoaster, Brazilian Buggies (2024), a mini log flume, Rio De Cacao (2024) and a spinning rapids ride, Amazonia (2024). In June 2019, the park opened the 3000 m^{2} Bellewaerde Aquapark, which features a variety of slides, pools, and a lazy river.

== History ==
On 3 July 1954, the Touristic Centre of Bellewaerde was founded in Zillebeke. It was opened originally as a zoo and safaripark by the Florizoone family, which also operated Meli Park in Adinkerke. In 1971, the name was changed to "Bellewaerde Park', and simplified to "Bellewaerde" in 2004. In the 1980s, the park evolved to an attraction park with rides such as the River Splash (a log flume, 1980) and the Keverbaan (a beetle coaster, 1981). In 1981, 1984 and 1985 the park was expanded with the addition of the "Far West", "Canada" and "Mexico" zones, respectively.

Bellewaerde was sold in the early 1990s to the Walibi group which in itself became part of the Six Flags Chain in 1998. Six Flags sold all of its European parks, including Bellewaerde, in 2004 to the British investment company Palamon. Bellewaerde is now part of the Grévin & Cie group, which is fully owned by Compagnie des Alpes.

In 2008, Bellewaerde officially became a zoo and a savannah-themed area was opened.

Bellewaerde is a seasonal theme park that is open for about seven months a year, from April until October. October is traditionally the month in which Bellewaerde's yearly Halloween Event takes place. Since 2005, the park also opens in the winter for few weeks during the Christmas and New Year period, decorated for the holidays with extra Christmas attractions and special entertainment.

== Rides & Attractions ==
=== Current attractions and rides ===
Canada
| Attraction Name | Type | Year of opening | Manufacturer | Additional information | Photo |
|---|---|---|---|---|---|
| Wakala | Family roller coaster | 2020 | Gerstlauer | Height: 21 m / Length: 660 m / Top speed: 50 km/h | |
| Camp Niagara | Shoot-the-chute | 1995 | Interlink and Space Leisure | With a 20-meter drop, Niagara was the highest splash in Europe. The ride has a bridge over the drop in which visitors can get soaked. | |
| Screaming Eagle | Shot 'n drop | 1999 | HUSS | Maximum height: 52 m Top speed: 70 km/h | |
| Indoor playground | Playground | | unknown | Inside the Canadian Tearoom | |
| Peter Pan | Caterpillar | 1989 | Mack Rides | Used to be in the India zone of the park until 2007. In 2008 it was moved instead of the Octopus in the Canada zone. | |
| Big Chute | Hara Kiri Raft Slide | 1989 | Van Egdom | Height: 10 m | |
| Pirate Ship | Pirate ship | 1987 | HUSS | From April 29 until May 1, 2014, Sam Clauw set a world record for "Longest ride on a amusement park ride". He sat on the ride for 50 hours straight. The stunt brought in 2350 euros which was donated to a breeding program for Amur leopards. | |
| Dawson Duel | Duelling alpine coaster | 2017 | Wiegand | Height: 25 m / Length: 450 m Top speed: 40 km/h 2 tracks for a duelling race. There are no brakes. The coaster is built on supports. | |
| Psssht station | Barnyard | 2023 | Zamperla | | |

India
| Attraction Name | Type | Year of opening | Manufacturer | Additional information | Photo |
|---|---|---|---|---|---|
| Bengal Express | Train ride | 1972 | Space Leisure | Was originally built at the playgrounds near the entrance of the park. The trains were moved in 1988 to their current location in the India area. During the ride a tape is played with information about the lions and tigers you see. | |
| Bengal Rapid River | Rapid river | 1988 | Vekoma and Space Leisure | 8 people per boat. The boats are divided in 4 compartiments that can move independently. Height difference: 3 m Length: 451 m | |
| Bengali | Stunt and diveshow | 2022 | | Pool diameter: 10 m Pool depth: 5 m Highest jump: 25 m Duration: 25 m | |
| Hampi | NebulaZ | 2023 | Zamperla | | |
| Hampi Playground | Playground | 2023 | | Playground is 400 m^{2}. | |

Jungle
| Attraction Name | Type | Year of opening | Manufacturer | Additional information | Photo |
|---|---|---|---|---|---|
| Jungle Mission | Tow boat ride | 1978 | Intamin AG | Has been renovated over the years: Original name was "Jungle Adventure" (until 1982) 1982: renamed to "Het Zoemende Ei" (based on the Belgian comic books of Suske & Wiske) 1997: renamed to "Voodoo River" 2011: renamed to "Jungle Mission" | |

Mundo Amazonia
| Attraction Name | Type | Year of opening | Manufacturer | Additional information | Photo |
|---|---|---|---|---|---|
| Amazonia | Spinning rapids ride | 2024 | Intamin | | |
| Rio Do Café | log flume | 1980 | Reverchon Industries | The highest fall is 12 m. | |
| Brazilian Buggies | Roller coaster | 2024 | Zamperla | Kids rollercoaster. | |
| Rio Do Cacao | log flume | 2024 | ABC Rides | Model: mini log flume | |

Mexico
| Attraction Name | Type | Year of opening | Manufacturer | Additional information | Photo |
|---|---|---|---|---|---|
| Boomerang | Shuttle coaster | 1984 | Vekoma | Maximum G forces: 5.2 G Maximum speed: 75.6 kilometres per hour (47.0 mph) First functional boomerang coaster in the world | |
| El Volador | Topple tower | 2005 | HUSS | Height: 20 metres (66 ft) Maximum tilt: 60 degrees First topple tower built | |
| El Toro | Breakdance | 2006 | HUSS | Bought from Walibi Holland where it was installed until 2005 | |
| 4D Cinema | 4D-film | 2006 | unknown | Bellewaerde tends to change the movie every season. There are also special movies for Halloween season and the Winter season (only in 2009) | |
| Huracan | Indoor coaster, darkride | 2013 | Zierer | First coaster in Belgium with an onboard sound system. | |

Kids Park
| Attraction Name | Type | Year of opening | Manufacturer | Additional information | Photo |
|---|---|---|---|---|---|
| Carrousel | Carousel | 1983 | unknown | | |
| Palendorp | Playground | 1985 | unknown | Renovated in 2015 | |
| Koffietassen | Teacups | 1989 | Mack Rides | | |
| Houdini's Magical House | Madhouse | 1999 | Vekoma | A Madhouse with the great Houdini as a theme. The story goes that the Great Houdini used to live there and after his mysterious death, it was opened to the public. However, Houdini's spirit lives on as he invites you in his house for one last magic trick. | |
| Flying Carrousel | Swing ride | 1999 | Zierer | | |
| Frog | Jumpin' Star | 2002 | Zamperla | | |
| Express Train | train ride | 2002 | Zamperla | Rio Grande Train | |
| Butterflies | Aerial Carousel | 2002 | Zamperla | | |
| Tuff-tuff | car ride | 2002 | Zamperla | | |
| Crazy Coach | Flying carpet | 2002 | Zamperla | | |
| Mini wheel | Ferris wheel | 2002 | Zamperla | | |
| Dancing Balloons | Balloon Race (ride) | 2002 | Zamperla | | |

=== Removed attractions and rides ===
| Name | Type | Opened | Closed | Manufacturer | Area | Reason | Photo |
|---|---|---|---|---|---|---|---|
| Shooting Gallaey | Shooting gallery with effects | 1987 | 2024 | | Far west | Needed to make space for a new zone. | |
| Lilly's casino | Arcade | 1987 | 2024 | | Far West | Needed to make space for a new zone. | |
| Ball pit | Ball pit | unknown | 2007 | unknown | KidsPark | unknown | |
| Scenic viewpoint | scenic viewpoint towards lions | 2012 | 2023 | unknown | India | Renovation | |
| Cinema 180 | Cinerama | unknown | 1986 | unknown | Far West | Burned down due to a short circuit in the Enterprise's motor nearby. | |
| Enterprise | Enterprise | 1981 | 1986 | HUSS Park Attractions | Far West | Burned down due to a short circuit in the motor. | |
| Tico Tico Show | Animatronics show | 1986 | 2002 | Golding Leisure Design International | Mexico | Removed due to old age and rising maintenance costs. Replaced by 4D Cinema. | |
| Dancing Queen | Paratroop swing ride | 1989 | 2004 | Frank Hrubetz | Mexico | Sold to De Valkenier in the Netherlands. Replaced by El Volador. | |
| Slide | Slide | unknown | 2007 | unknown | KidsPark | Failed inspection due to old age. | |
| Monorail | Monorail | 1983 | 2007 | Mahieu | Station: Jungle Route: Jungle, Far West, Mexico | Removed due to material fatigue, too old to repair | |
| Octopus | Octopus | 1987 | 2007 | Carrouselbouw Holland Van Velzen | Canada | Too old to repair. Replaced by Peter Pan | |
| Oldtimers | Car ride | 1981 | 2009 | Metallbau Emmeln | Far West | Removed to make room for the European Bisons enclosure | |
| Los Piratas | Dark water ride | 1991 | 2012 | Mack Rides + Golding Leisure Design International | Mexico | Removed due to old age and was no longer in compliance with fire safety. Replaced by Huracan | |
| Gold Rush | Stunt- & dive show | 2015 | 2021 | unknown | Canada | Bellewaerde wanted a new show. | |
| keverbaan | kids rollercoaster | 1981 | 2022 | zierer | far west | removed to make place for a new water attraction | |

== Animals ==
=== Current animals ===
| Name | Park Area | Additional information | Photo |
|---|---|---|---|
| Squirrel monkey | Canada | | |
| Patagonian mara | Canada | | |
| Lions | India | | |
| Tigers | India | | |
| Amur leopard | India | | |
| Rothschild's giraffe | Savanna | | |
| Zebras | Savanna | | |
| Ring-tailed lemur | Savanna | | |
| Red ruffed lemurs | Savanna | | |
| Pelicans | Jungle | | |
| Capybaras | Jungle | | |
| Nasua | Jungle | | |
| Aras | Jungle | | |
| Flamingos | Jungle | | |
| Gracile capuchin monkeys | Jungle | | |
| Emperor tamarins | Jungle | | |
| Wallaby | KidsPark | | |
| Alpaca | KidsPark | | |
| Goats | KidsPark | | |

== See also ==
- Walibi Belgium
- Walibi Holland
- Walibi Rhône-Alpes
- Walibi Lorraine
- Walibi Aquitaine

== Gallery ==
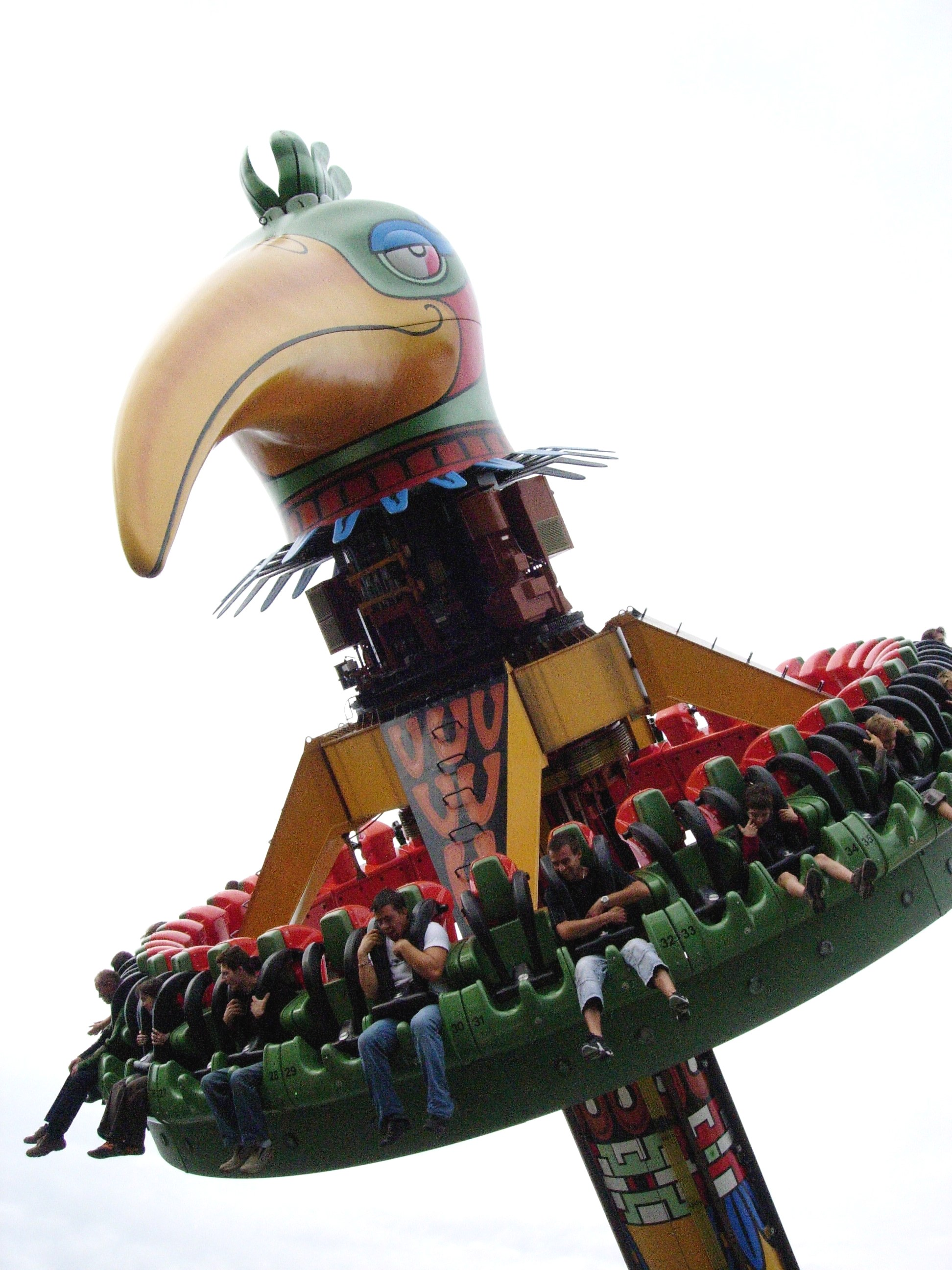
El Volador.

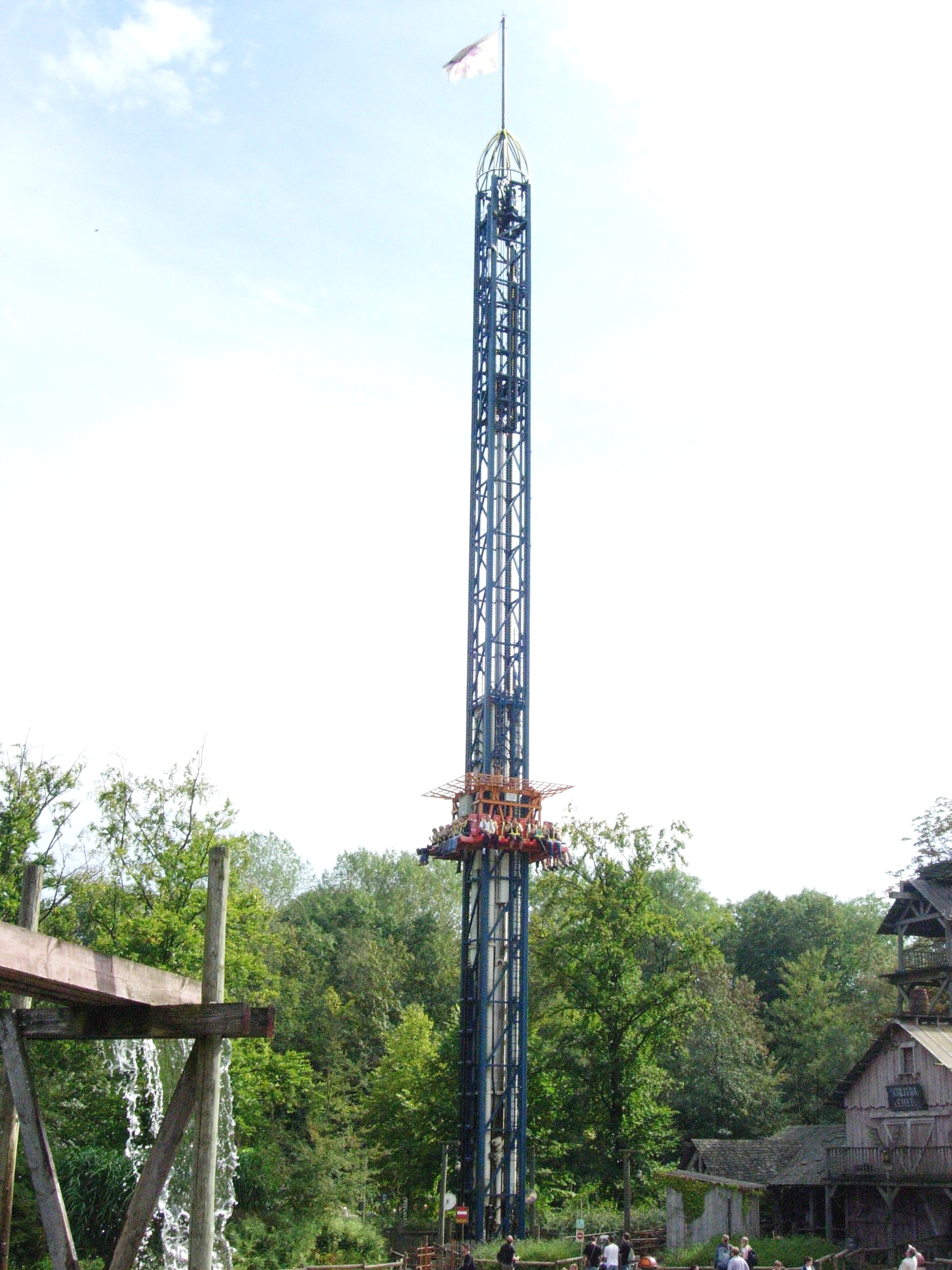
Screaming Eagle.

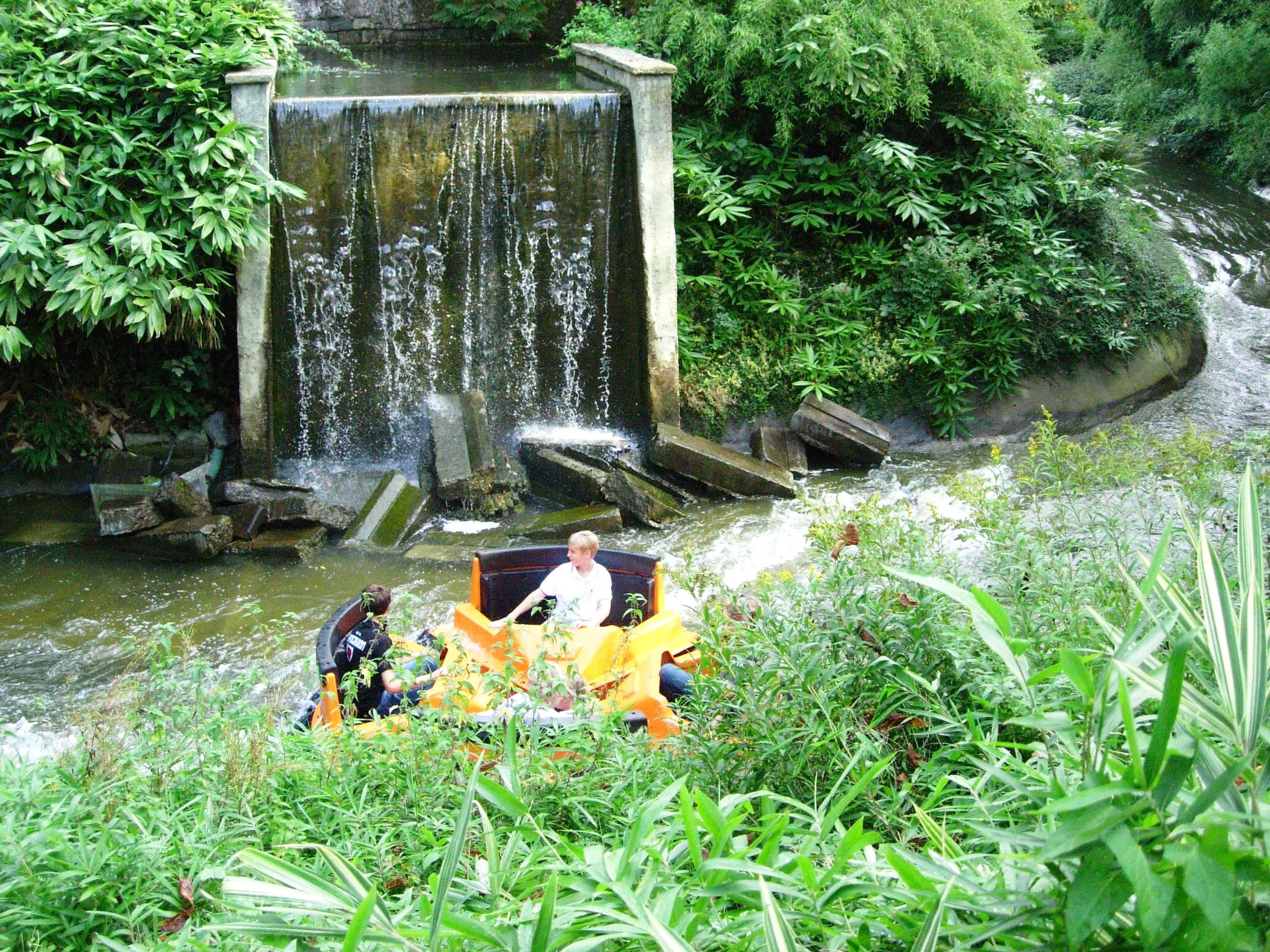
Bengal Rapid River.

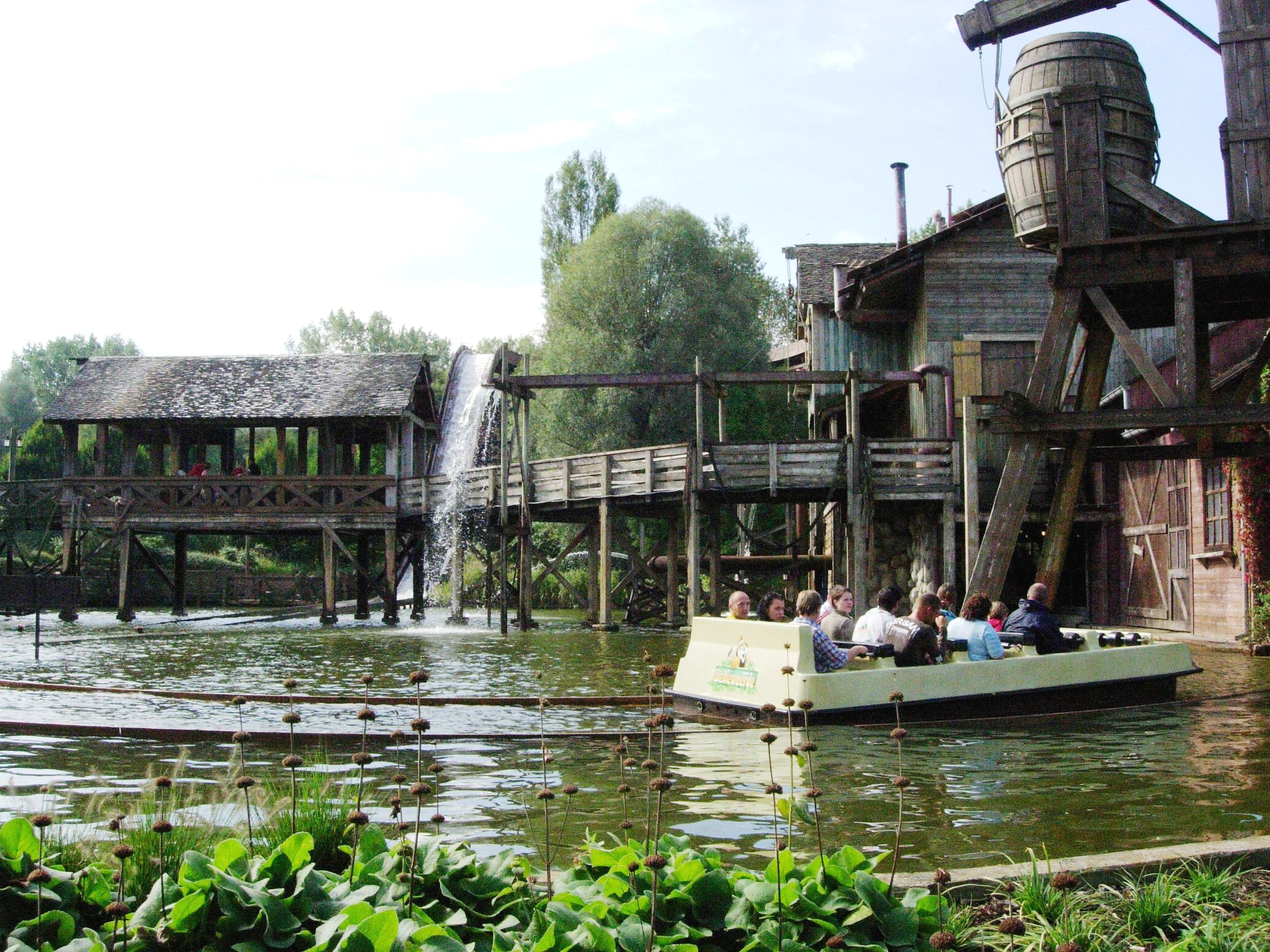
Niagara.

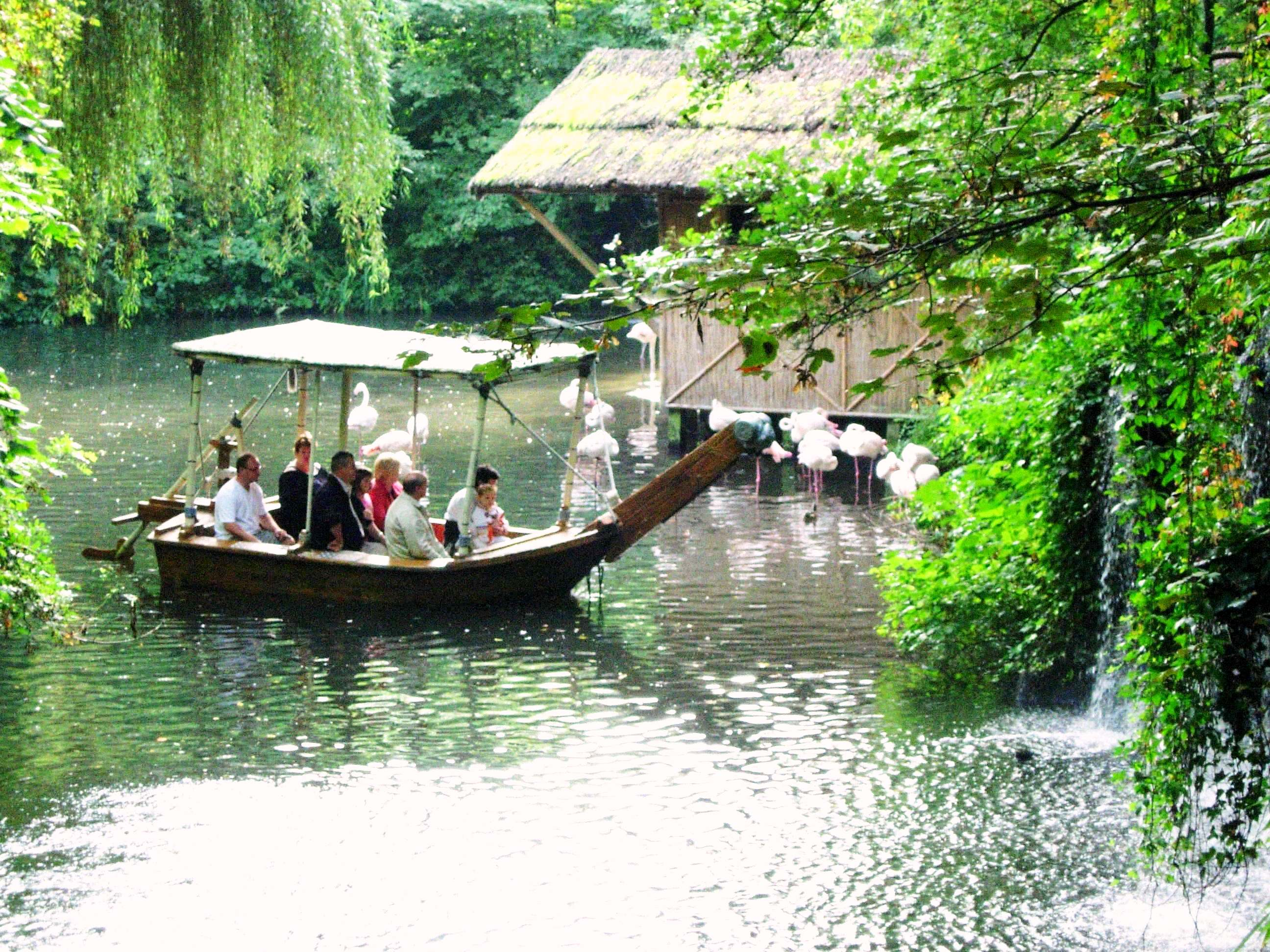
Jungle mission.
