= Dawson Duel =

Racing roller coaster at Bellewaerde

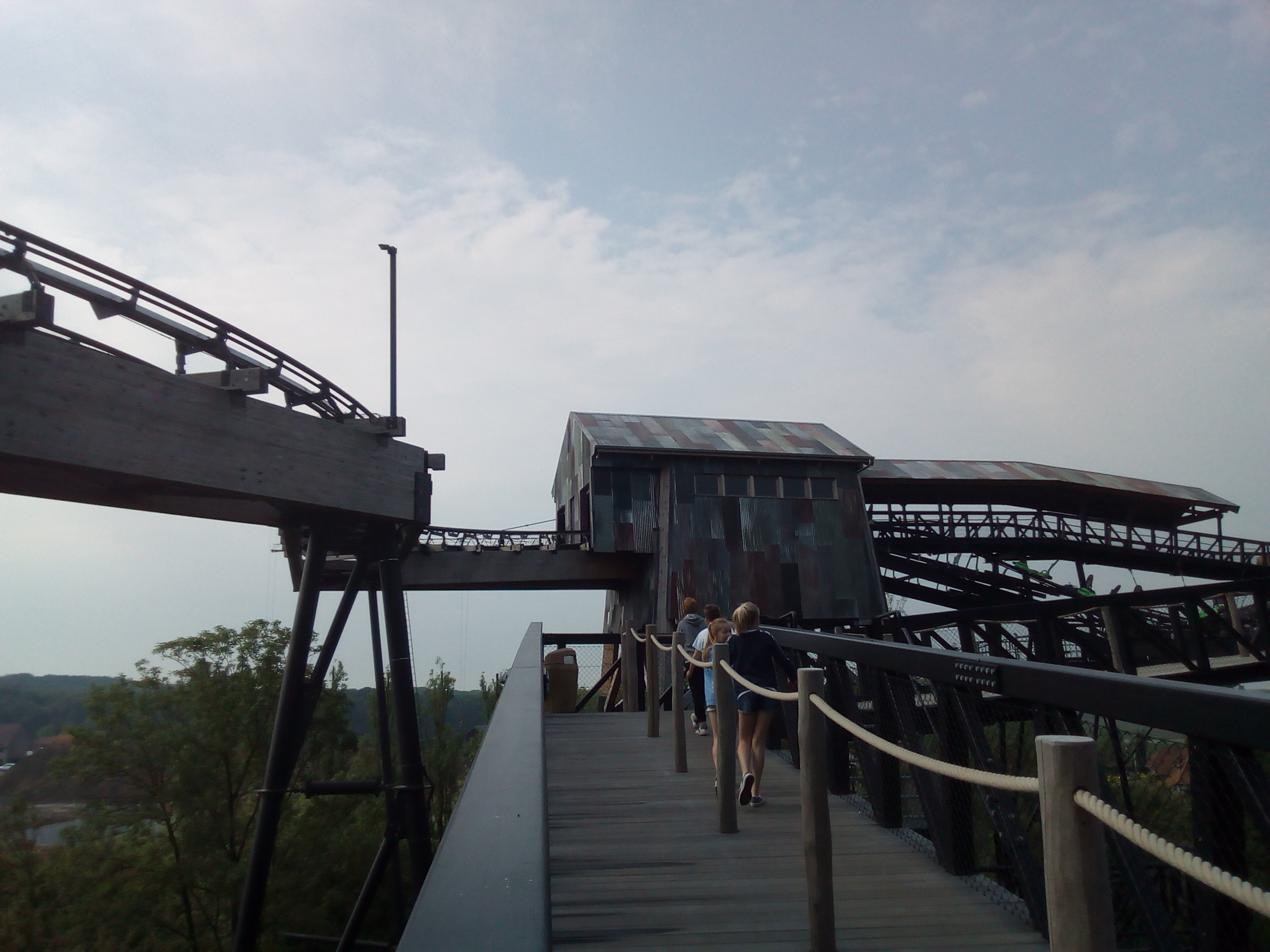

Bellewaerde
- Park section: Canada
- Coordinates: 50.848335°N 2.947524°E
- Status: Operating
- Opening date: May 5, 2017
- Cost: €4,000,000

General statistics
- Type: Steel – Dueling – Racing
- Manufacturer: Wiegand
- Model: Sport Coaster
- Lift/launch system: Cable lift hill
	Blue	Green
Height	82 ft (25.0 m)	82 ft (25.0 m)
Length	1,607.6 ft (490.0 m)	1,607.6 ft (490.0 m)
Speed	24.9 mph (40.1 km/h)	24.9 mph (40.1 km/h)
Inversions	0	0
- Capacity: 800 riders per hour
- Height restriction: 100 cm (3 ft 3 in)
- Trains: 46 trains with a single car. Riders are arranged 1 across in 2 rows for a total of 2 riders per train.
- Official Website: Official website
- Virtual queue: Available
- Must transfer from wheelchair
- Dawson Duel at RCDB; Pictures of Dawson Duel at RCDB

Dawson Duel is a racing alpine coaster at Bellewaerde near Ypres, Belgium. The attraction became the first in Europe to race two alpine coaster tracks against one another, and the first to also be built on an artificial, man-made slope instead of natural terrain. Dawson Duel's name and theme pays homage to the town of Dawson City in the Yukon Territory, and the Yukon Quest Sled dog racing event. The ride was constructed at a cost of €4,000,000 and is one of the most popular attractions in the park.

== History ==
On 13 September 2016 Bellewaerde officials announced the construction of a European first; a dueling alpine coaster built on an elevated manmade slope. The €4,000,000 attraction would feature two side-by-side tracks that would have riders board at the top of an 82-foot (25 m) tall tower and slide down to the bottom, with the attraction set to open in 2017. Construction began soon after, and continued throughout the winter, with track first being installed on the support structure in January.

On 27 January 2017, during a press conference at the attraction's construction site, park officials unveiled the name of the ride to be Dawson Duel, after the Canadian town, Dawson City, Yukon. An animated 3D simulation of the ride structure and experience was subsequently released on YouTube. Following the ride's completion and weeks of test runs, Dawson Duel opened to the public on 5 May 2017. The ride quickly became one of the park's most popular attractions, and throughout the 2017 season wait times would fluctuate between an average 40-70 minutes.

For the 2018 season, following excessive wait times caused by the low capacity, Bellewaerde and Wiegand made several modifications to the ride system that would raise its capacity by an estimated 50%. The loading procedure and brake test system was optimized, and six new cars were purchased, thus enabling the ride to run more carts on the track. The modifications were inspected and approved by the third-party T.U.V. service company. In 2019, two years after the coaster opened, Bellewaerde would continue to combat long wait times and begin testing a virtual queue system using the smartphone app Lineberty.

== Characteristics ==
=== Ride experience ===
Riders will make their way up and queue in a very long footpath up to the ride's boarding platform, which is located 82 feet (25 m) above-ground, providing for some beautiful panoramic views of the park and surrounding area. Upon reaching the boarding platform, riders are divided between either of the two tracks; green or blue. Riders will board the tracks and race each another down to the ground through a consistent descent, which includes a pair of helixes along the way. At the bottom of the ride, the cars enter the brake run, and riders onboard at the unload platform and the cars are hoisted back up to the load platform by a winding cable lift hill.

=== Statistics ===
Dawson Duel has a pair of parallel tracks, known informally as Blue and Green, each of which are identical. Both tracks have a length of 1,607.6 feet (490.0 m), can enable a top speed of a top speed of 24.9 mph (40.1 km/h), and load riders from a beginning height of 82 feet (25 m) (although the actual watchtower reaches a total height of 91.8 feet (28.0 m)). However, out of the entire circuit, only 1,474 feet (449 m) of track is traversed with riders on board, as the cars are pulled to the boarding platform from the unload station without riders. Between both tracks, Dawson Duel first operated with 40 cars, although an extra half-dozen were purchased for the 2018 season, and following modifications the attraction can now run 46. Each of these cars can sit 1-2 riders inline, and unlike most other alpine coasters, riders do not have access to manual braking throughout the ride.

Dawson Duel is manufactured by Wiegand, a German firm that specializes in alpine coasters and waterslides, some of which would be provided for the Bellewaerde Aquapark in 2019. The attraction is the first of Wiegand's Sport Coaster model line, whose sole difference from the average alpine coaster is the lack of rider-controlled brakes, which was removed in favor of automatic braking. To substitute for the risk of riders going over speed or getting too close to another car ahead, each car has sensors that will keep the speed below or at 24.9 mph (40.1 km/h) if that is the case, or a compulsory stop at the bottom, thus ensuring that there is no risk of collision.

=== Ride structure ===
Dawson Duel is built on a network of steel and wooden supports to make up for the lack of natural terrain that alpine coasters are built around. All parts of the ride except for the coaster's track, trains, and immediate hardware were developed and manufactured locally; the track pieces were manufactured at Wiegand's plant in Germany, and installed on top of these supports. The layout of the ride itself was designed in a close collaboration between Bellewaerde and Wiegand.

=== Theme ===
Dawson Duel is themed around the annual 1,000-mile Yukon Quest Sled dog racing event, which typically starts in Fairbanks, Alaska, and ends in Whitehorse, Yukon. The Canadian town of Dawson City serves as the half-way point and enforces a mandatory resting period of 36 hours for all participants. It is this factor that the ride's name is derived from, and the park considers the climb up to the top to be the "first half" of the race, and the ride back down as the second.

== Photo Gallery ==
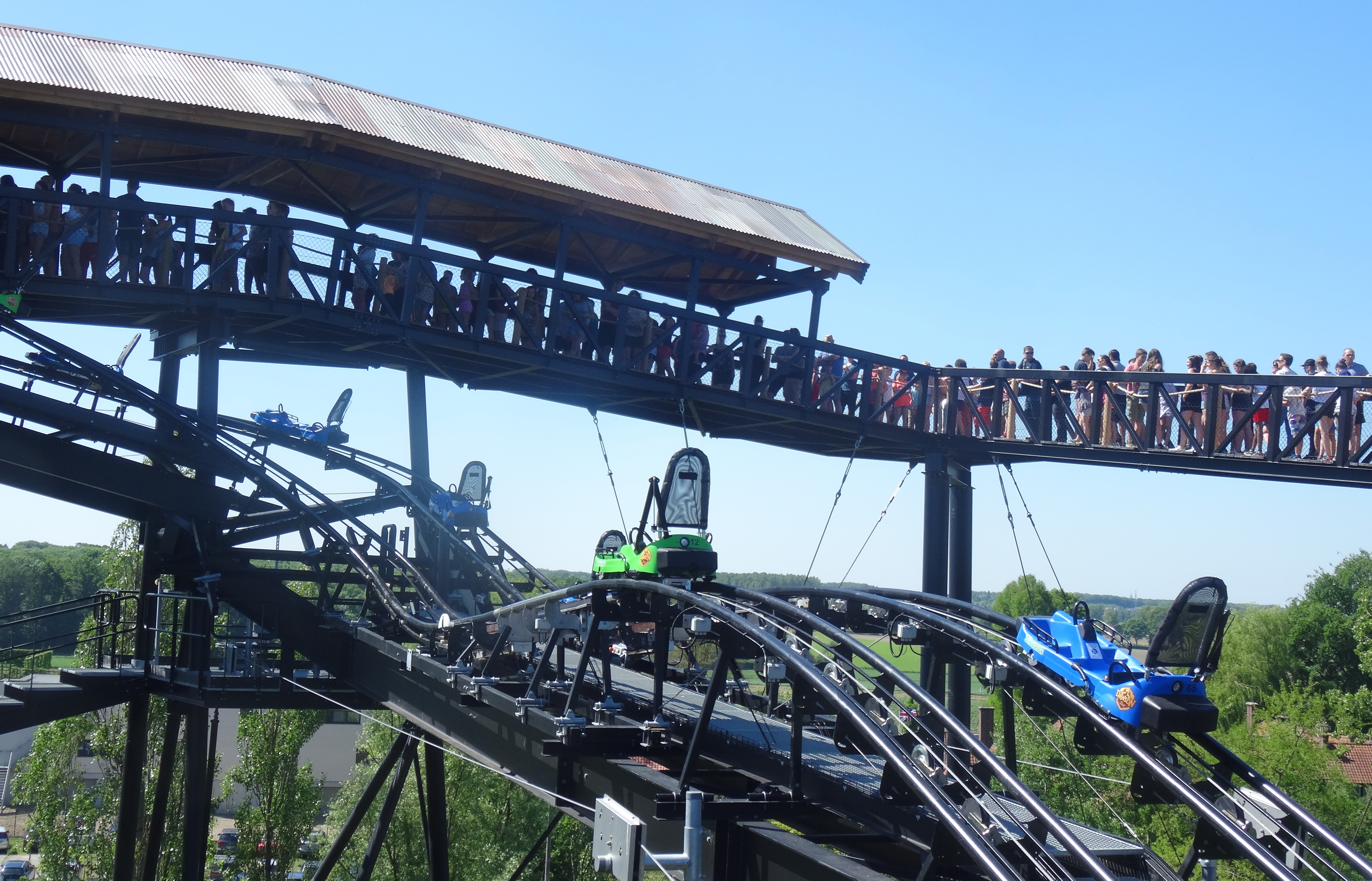
Top of lift and queue

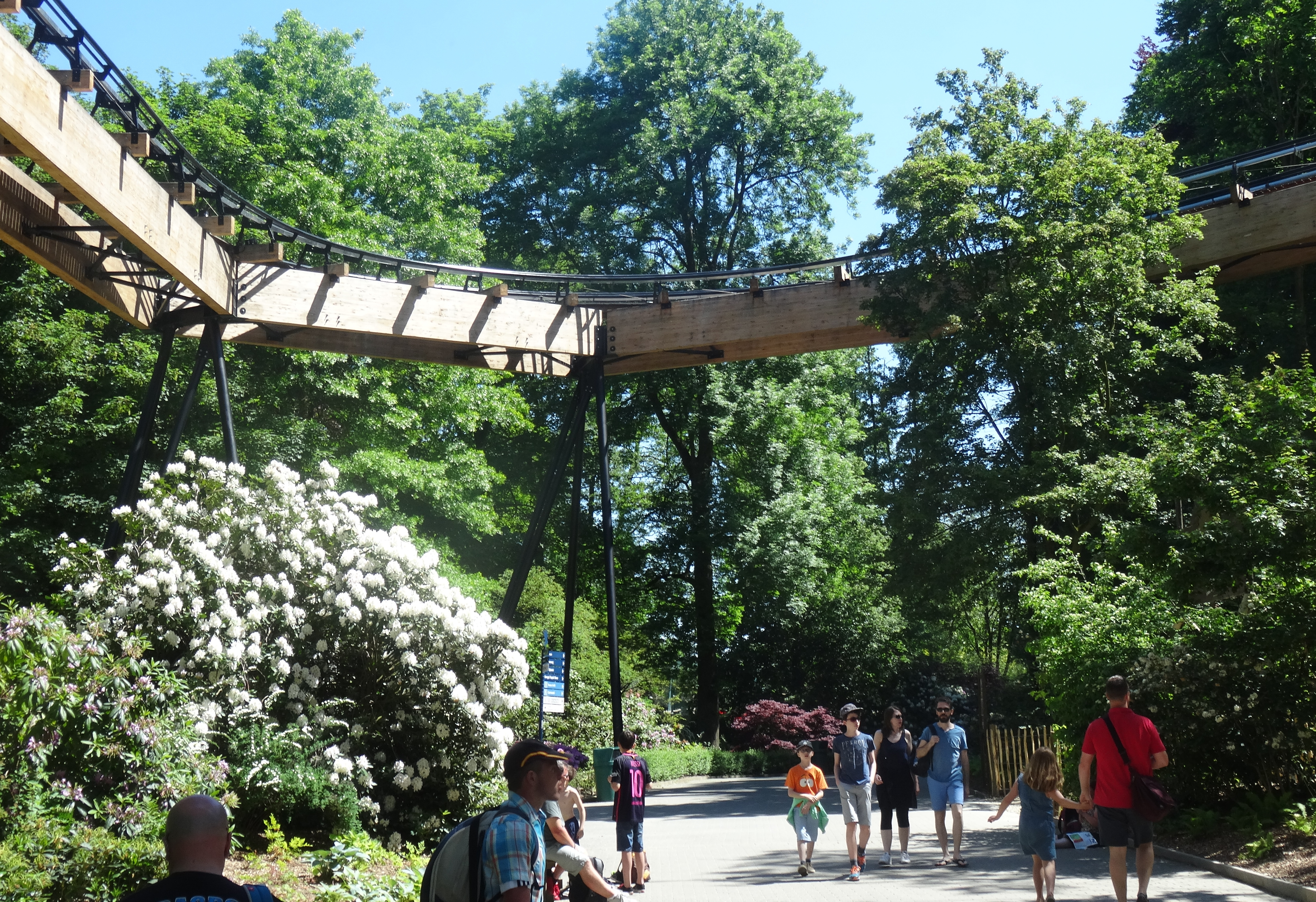
View from the pathway

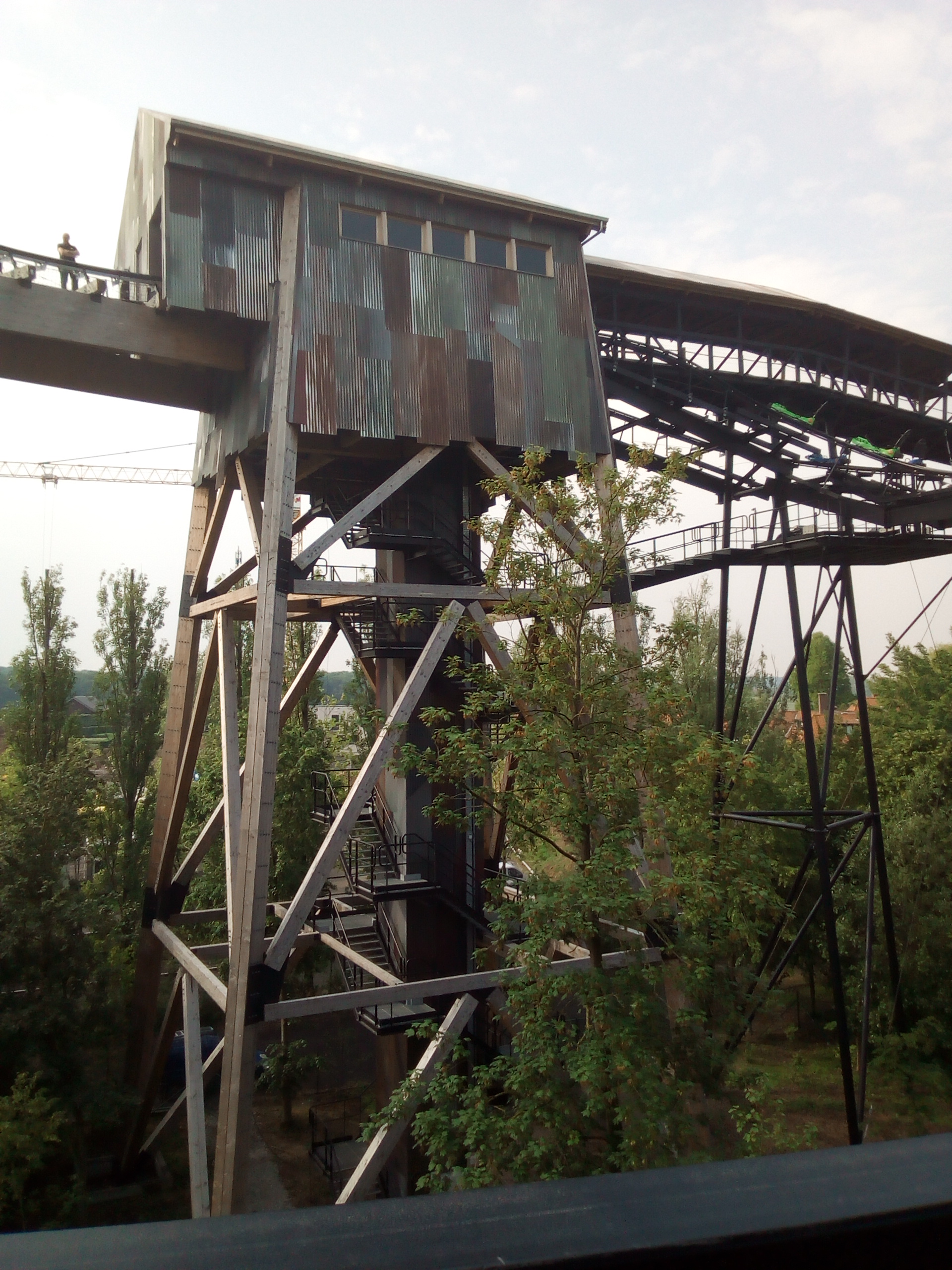
Watchtower

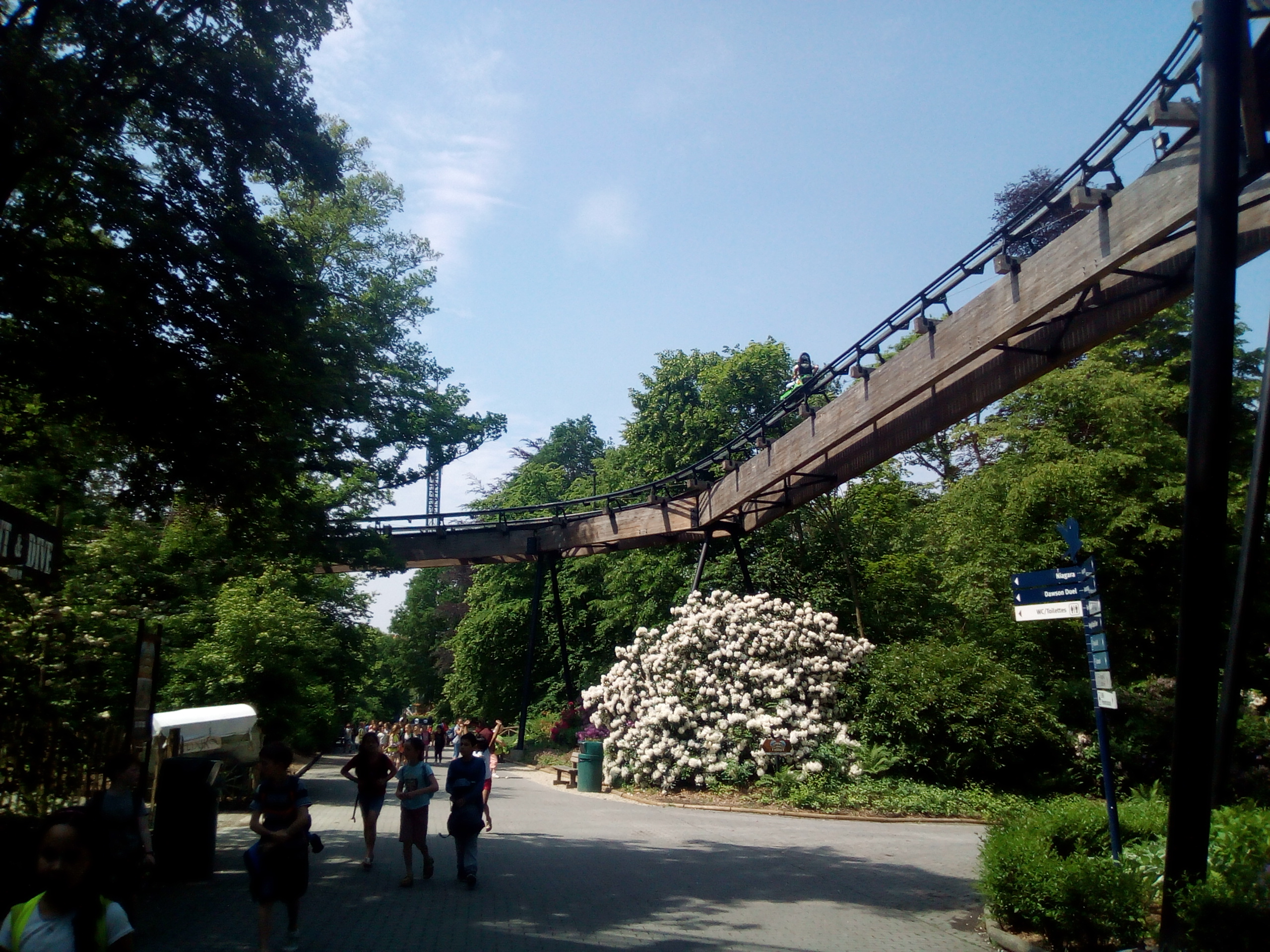
View from the pathway

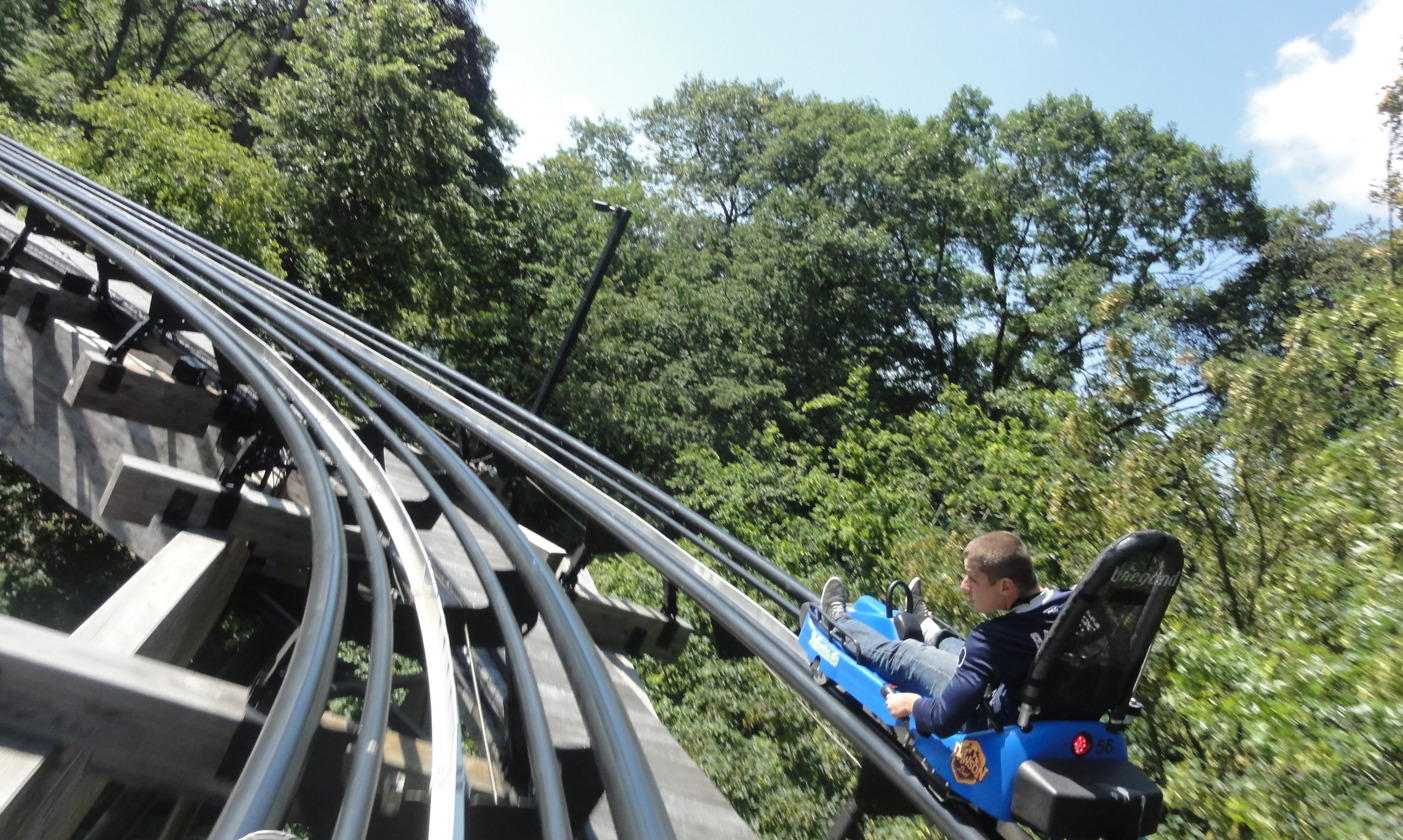
Onride

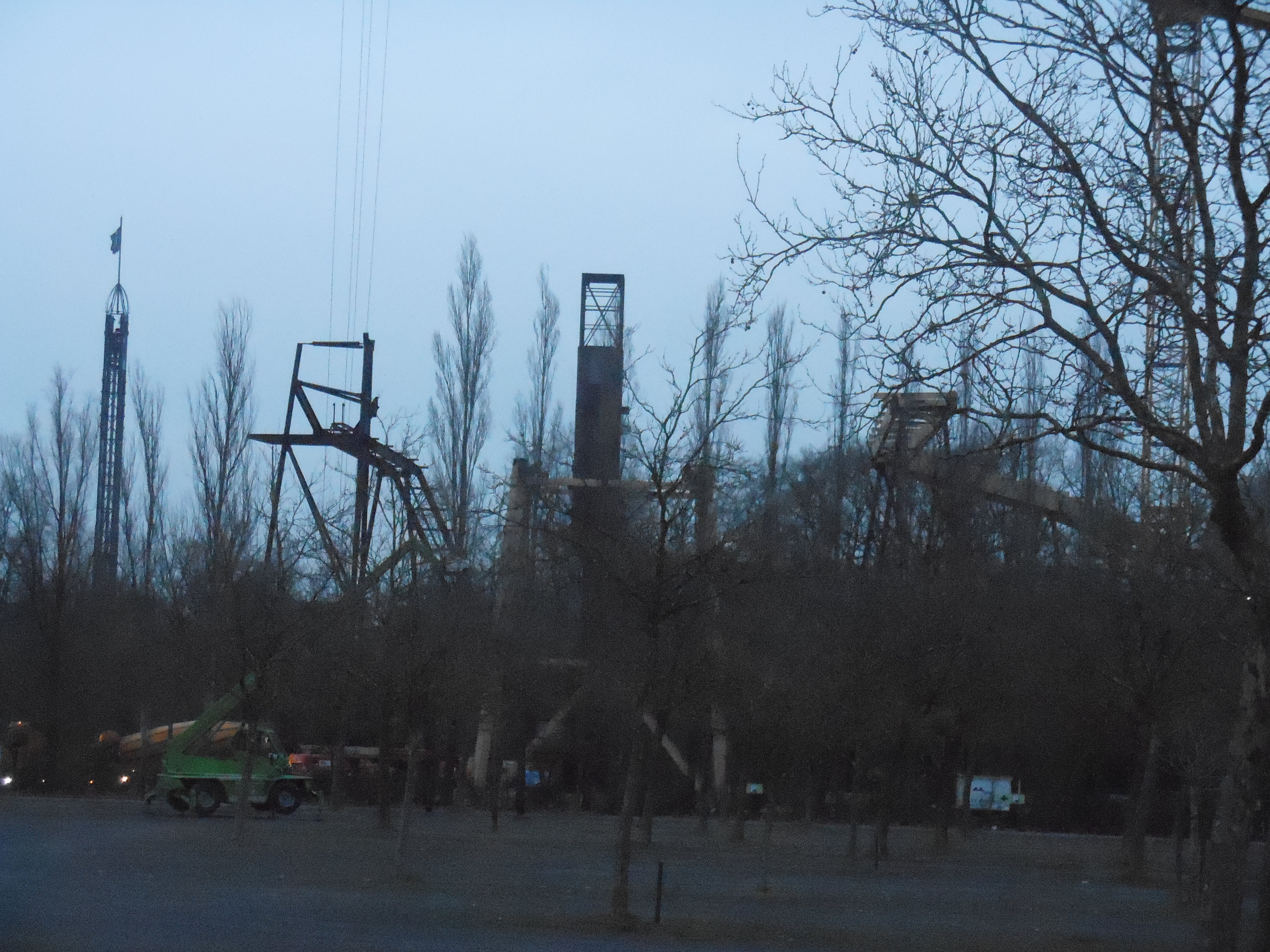
Tower under construction

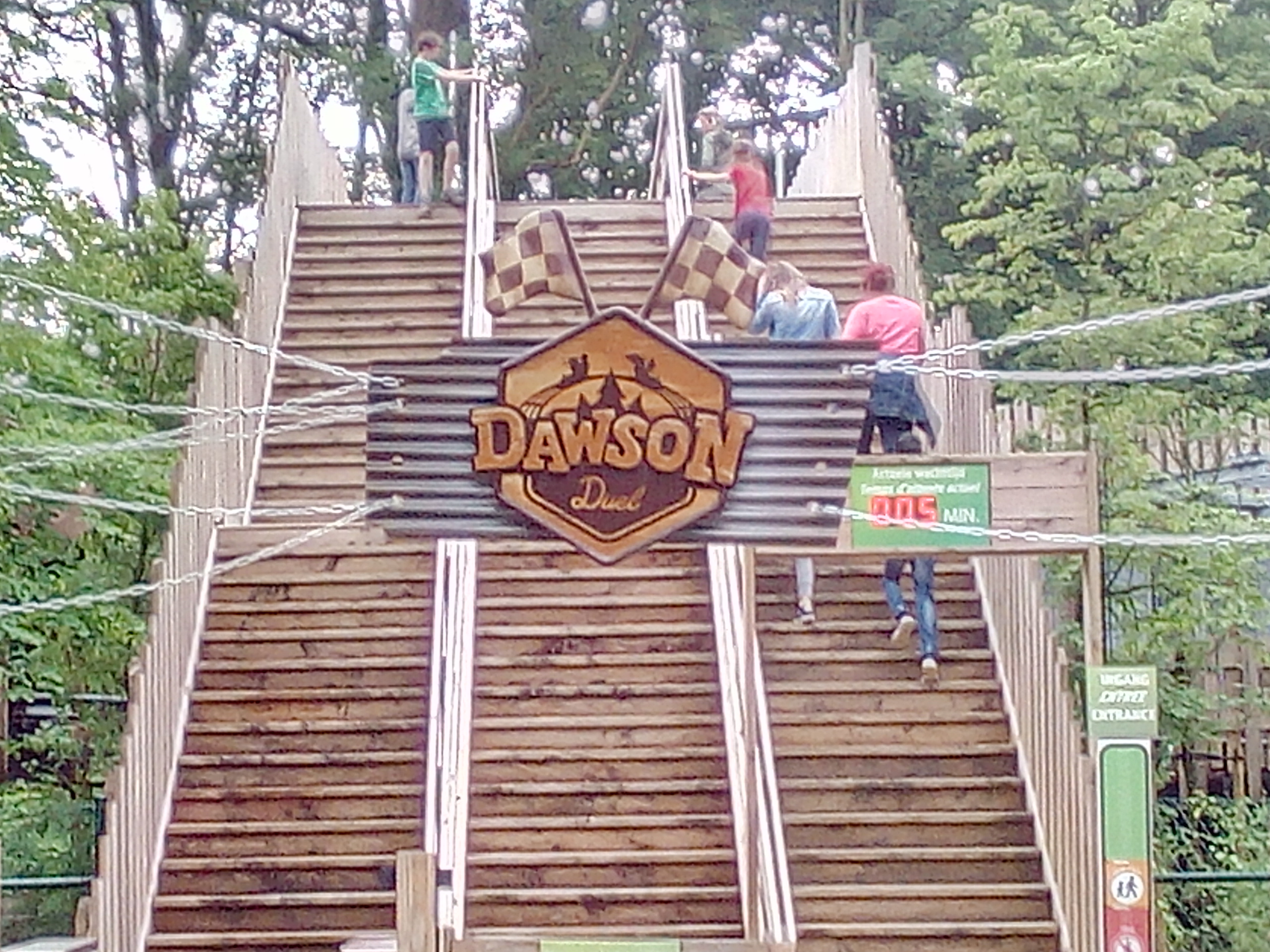
Standby entrance, priority riders, and ride exit

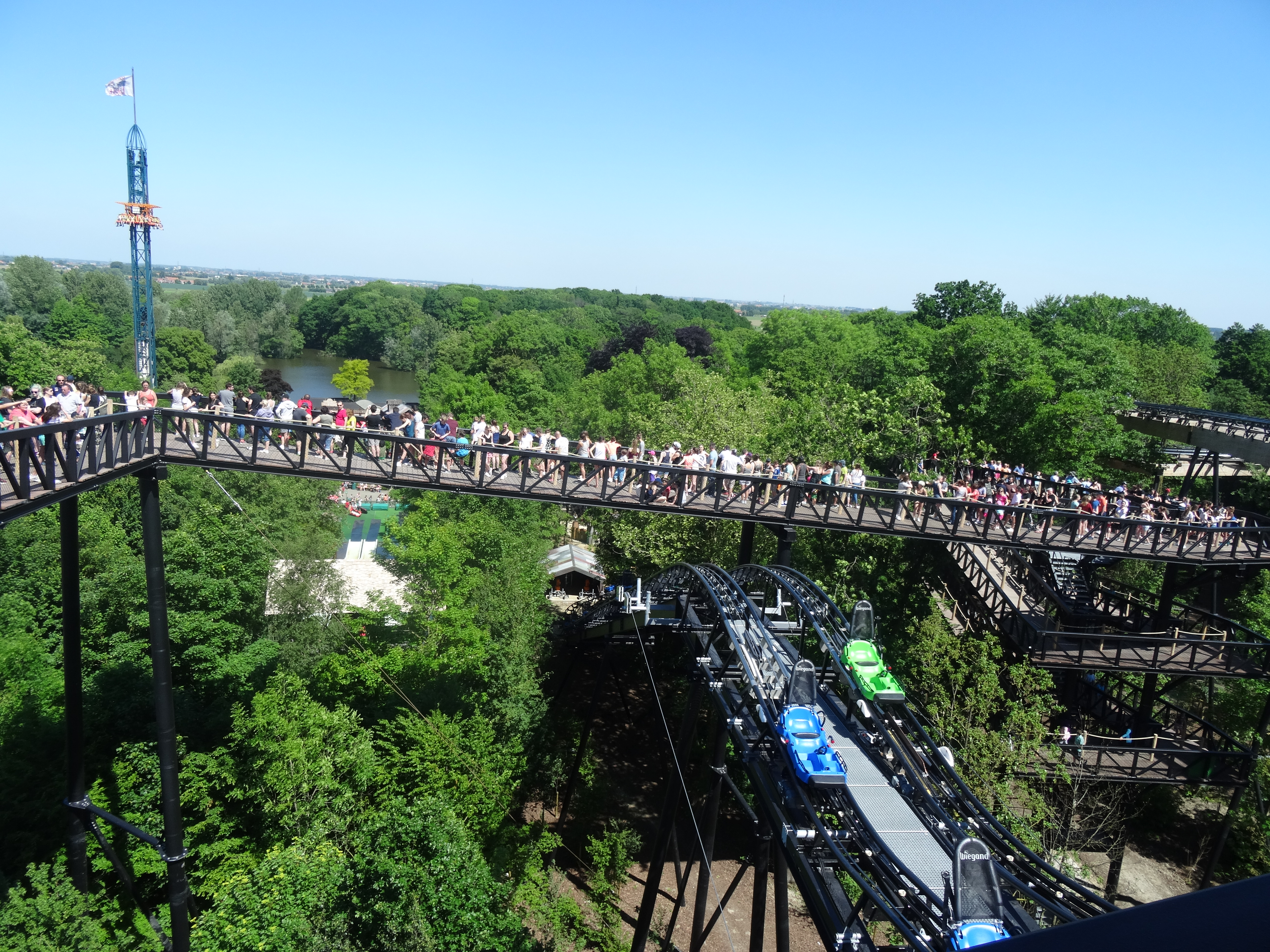
View from the top

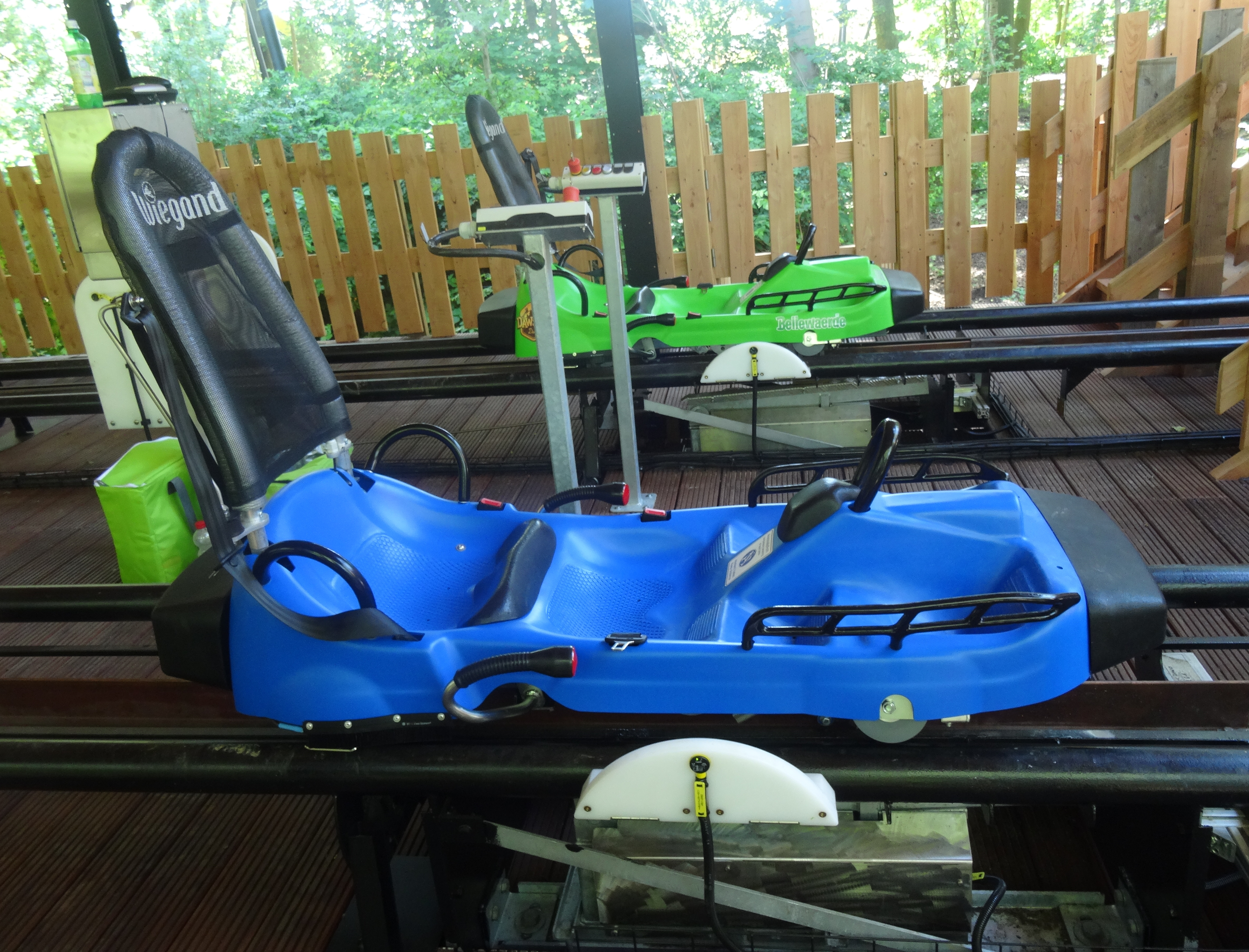
Blue and Green

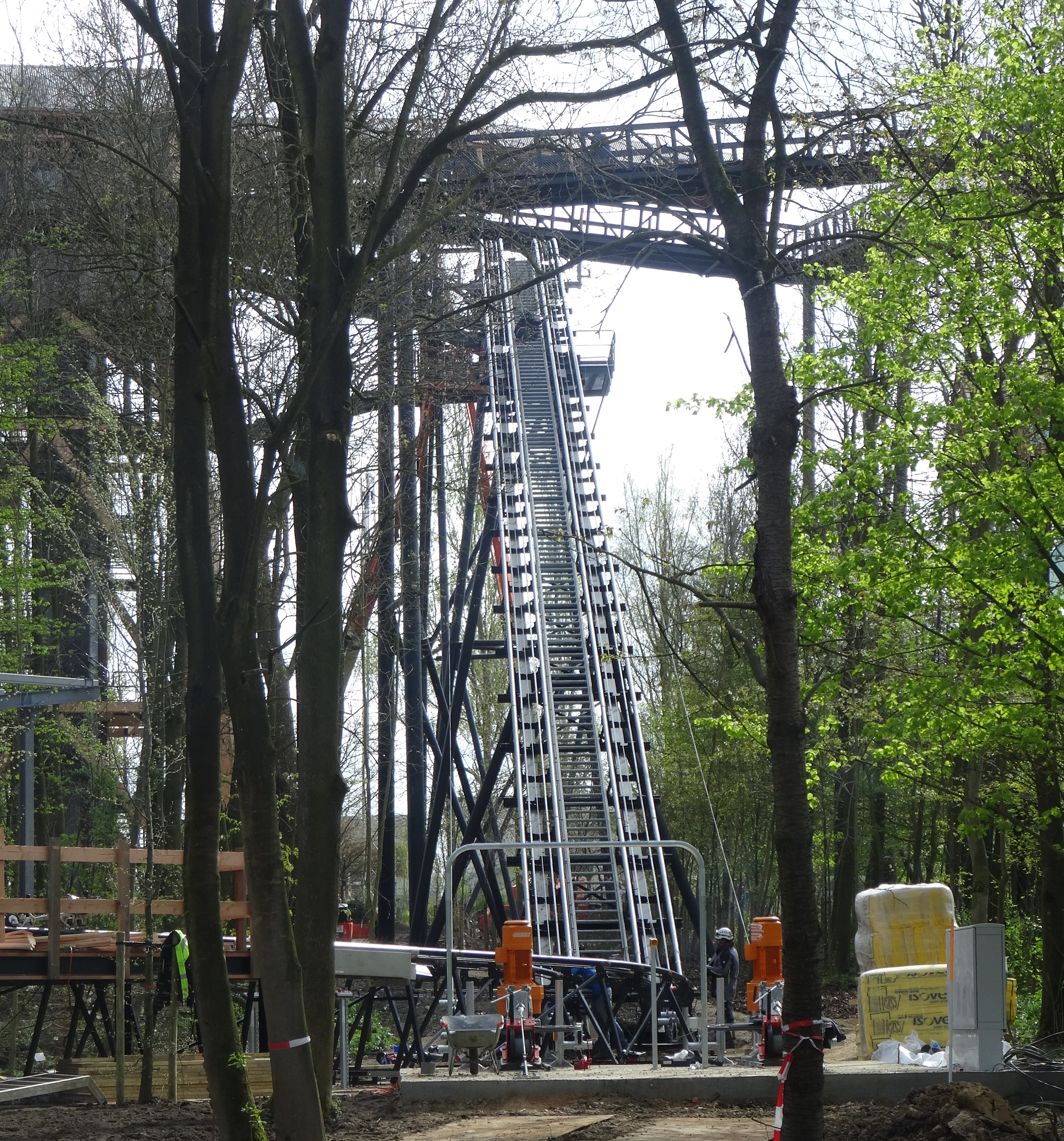
Main lift hill, during construction

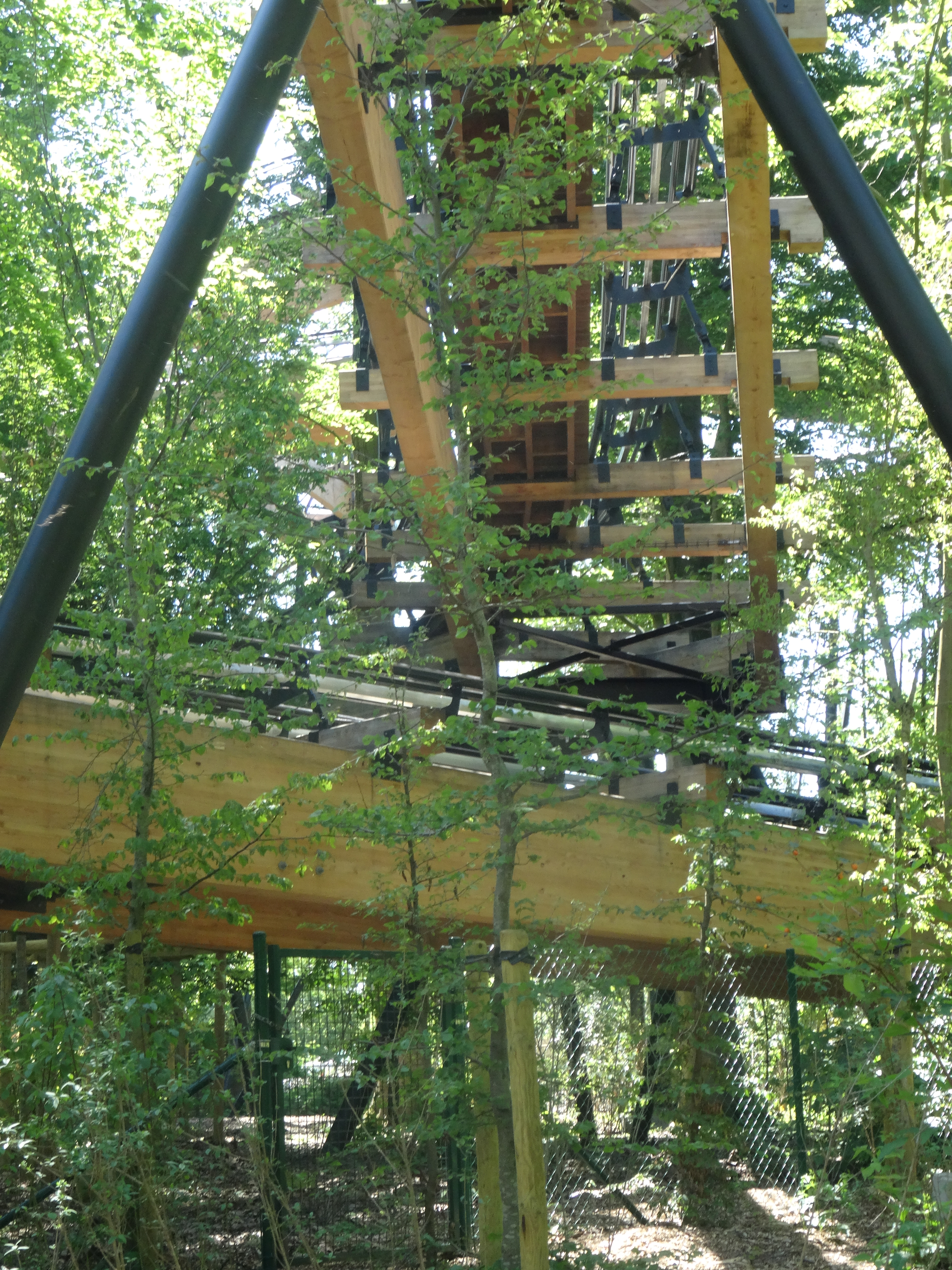
Wooden Support Structure

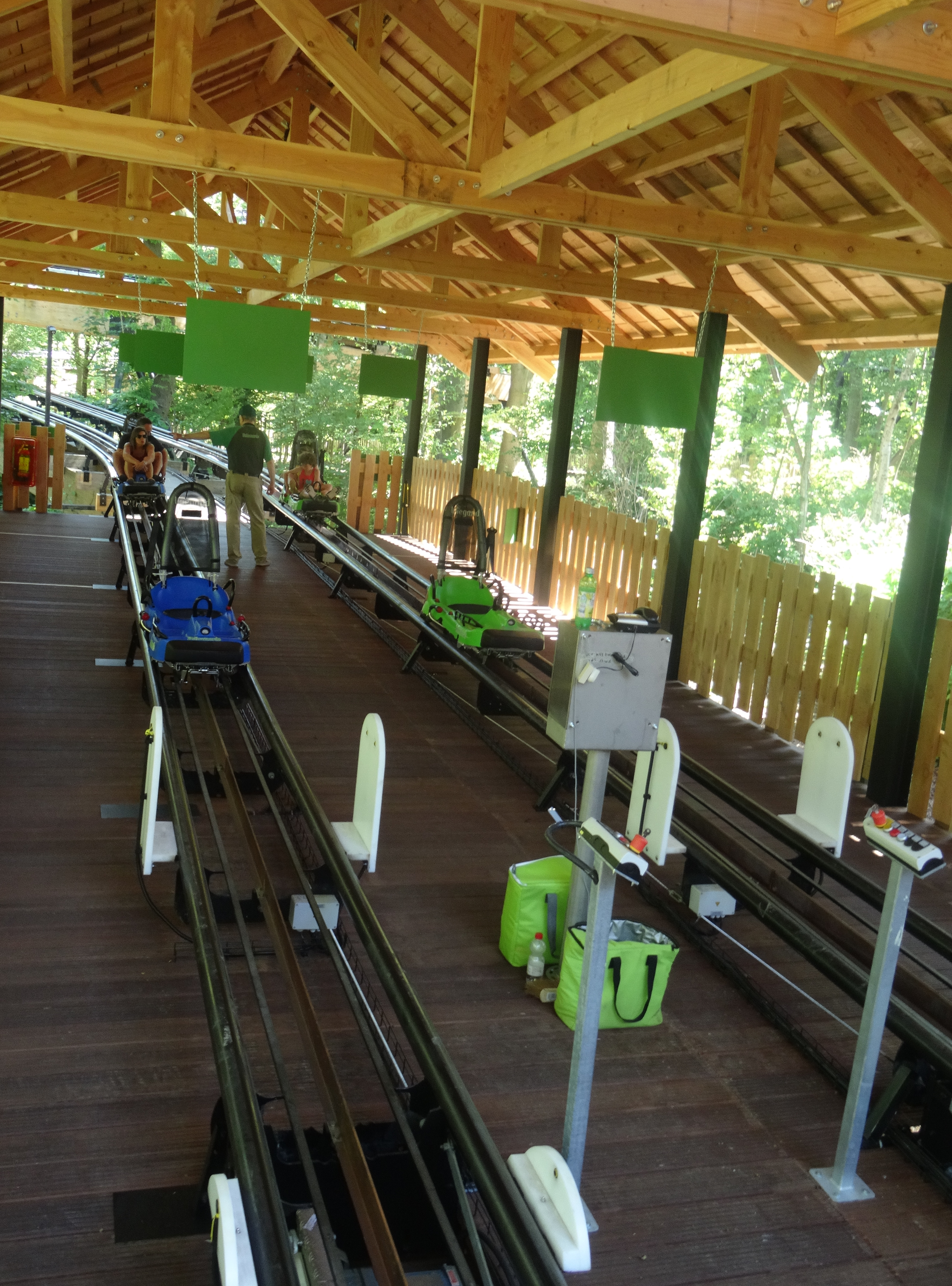
Unload platform
