= Neighbourhood (album) =

Studio album by Manu Katché
- Released: September 23, 2005
- Recorded: March and November 2004
- Studio: Rainbow Studio; Oslo, Norway
- Genre: Jazz
- Length: 55:01
- Label: ECM; ECM 1896
- Producer: Manfred Eicher

Manu Katché chronology
| It's About Time (1992) | Neighbourhood (2005) | Playground (2007) |

Professional ratings
Review scores
| Source | Rating |
|---|---|
| Allmusic | 4/5 stars |
| The Penguin Guide to Jazz Recordings | 3/4 stars |

Neighbourhood is the second solo album by session drummer Manu Katché, recorded in March and November 2004 and released on ECM September the following year. Unlike his previous album, It's About Time, considered a rock/funk album, Neighbourhood is jazz.

== Track listing ==
All tracks composed by Manu Katché

1. "November 99" – 6:02
2. "Number One" – 6:13
3. "Lullaby" – 6:16
4. "Good Influence" – 5:01
5. "February Sun" – 4:50
6. "No Rush" – 5:52
7. "Lovely Walk" – 6:20
8. "Take Off and Land" – 4:02
9. "Miles Away" – 4:14
10. "Rose" – 6:11

== Personnel ==
- Manu Katché – percussion, drums
- Sławomir Kurkiewicz – double bass
- Marcin Wasilewski – piano
- Jan Garbarek – saxophones
- Tomasz Stańko – trumpet
