= Marcin Wasilewski (pianist) =

Polish pianist and composer

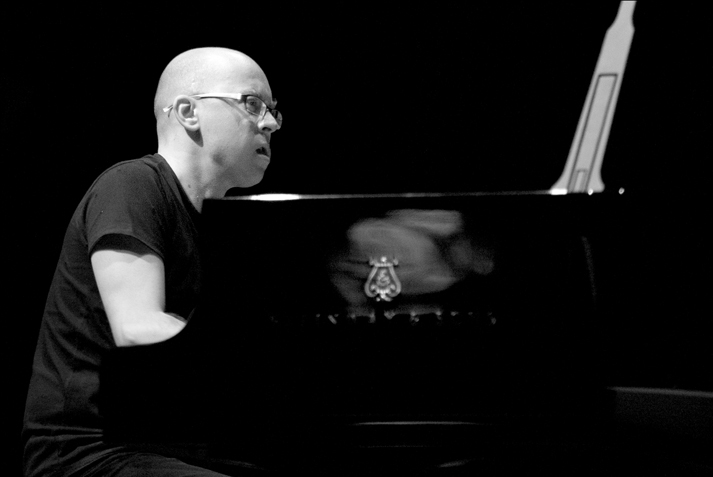

Background information
- Born: Marcin Wasilewski
- Origin: Poland
- Genres: Jazz
- Occupations: Pianist, composer
- Instrument: Piano

Marcin Wasilewski (born 1975 in Slawno, Zachodniopomorskie) is a Polish pianist and composer.

Wasilewski established a musical partnership with bassist Slawomir Kurkiewicz and drummer Michal Miskiewicz as the Simple Acoustic Trio in the early-1990s. Polish trumpeter Tomasz Stańko mentored the group for several years before recruiting the trio as his working band in 2001.

== Discography ==
=== Marcin Wasilewski Trio ===
Title	Album details	Peak chart positions		Sales	Certifications
Title	Album details	POL	US Jazz	Sales	Certifications
Trio	Released: February 15, 2005; Label: ECM Records; Formats: CD, digital download				
January	Released: January 21, 2008; Label: ECM Records; Formats: CD, digital download	23	21		
Faithful	Released: March 4, 2011; Label: ECM Records; Formats: CD, digital download	26	14	POL: 5,000+	POL: Gold
Spark of Life, with Joakim Milder	Released: October 10, 2014; Label: ECM Records; Formats: CD, digital download	20	23	POL: 5,000+	POL: Gold
Live	Released: September 14, 2018; Label: ECM Records; Formats: LP, CD, digital download				
Arctic Riff, with Joe Lovano	Released: June 26, 2020; Label: ECM Records; Formats: LP, CD, digital download				
Homage, with Joe Lovano	Released: April 25, 2025; Label: ECM Records; Formats: LP, CD, digital download				
"—" denotes a recording that did not chart or was not released in that territory.

=== Appearances ===
Album	Year	Ref.
Tomasz Stańko Quartet – Soul of Things	2002	
Tomasz Stańko Quartet – Suspended Night	2004	
Manu Katché – Neighbourhood	2005	
Tomasz Stańko Quartet – Lontano	2006	
Manu Katché – Playground	2007	
Jacob Young – Forever Young	2014	
