= Trio (Marcin Wasilewski album) =

Studio album by Marcin Wasilewski
- Released: April 23, 2005
- Recorded: March 2004
- Studio: Rainbow Studio; Oslo, Norway
- Genre: Jazz
- Length: 63:33
- Label: ECM; ECM 1891
- Producer: Manfred Eicher

Marcin Wasilewski chronology
Lyrics (2001)	Trio (2005)	January (2007)

Trio is an album by Polish jazz pianist and composer Marcin Wasilewski, featuring bassist Slawomir Kurkiewicz and drummer Michal Miskiewicz, recorded in March 2004 and released on ECM April the following year.

== Reception ==
The AllMusic review by Thom Jurek awarded the album 4 stars stating "While none of these men are flashy as soloists, they are seriously accomplished jazzmen with advanced ability to hang with anyone. They have the goods, the ideas, and the method. When playing together, they can literally astonish because they make it all sound so easy. It's been a few years since a piano trio's debut has literally sung, but this one does so unceasingly. It has color and space and drama and beauty in spades."

Professional ratings
Review scores
Source	Rating
Allmusic	4/5 stars

== Track listing ==
All compositions by Marcin Wasilewski, Slawomir Kurkiewicz and Michal Miskiewicz except where noted.

1. "Trio Conversation (Introduction)" – 2:47
2. "Hyperballad" (Björk) – 5:55
3. "Roxana's Song" (Karol Szymanowski) – 4:27
4. "K.T.C." (Wasilewski) – 6:22
5. "Plaza Real" (Wayne Shorter) – 5:55
6. "Shine" (Wasilewski) – 6:04
7. "Green Sky" (Tomasz Stańko) – 6:52
8. "Sister's Song" (Ewa Wasilewska, Wasilewski) – 6:02
9. "Drum Kick" – 1:45
10. "Free-Bop" (Wasilewski) – 4:34
11. "Free Combinations for Three Instruments" – 4:56
12. "Entropy" – 5:53
13. "Trio Conversation (The End)" – 2:01

== Personnel ==
- Marcin Wasilewski – piano
- Slawomir Kurkiewicz – bass
- Michal Miskiewicz – drums
