= Playground (Manu Katché album) =

Studio album by Manu Katché
- Released: September 25, 2007
- Recorded: January 2–7, 2007
- Studio: Avatar (New York, New York)
- Genre: Improvised music, jazz
- Length: 70:04
- Label: ECM; ECM 2016
- Producer: Manfred Eicher

Manu Katché chronology
Neighbourhood (2004)	Playground (2007)	Third Round (2010)

Playground is an album by drummer and composer Manu Katché recorded in the first week of 2007 and released September 25, 2007 on ECM.

== Reception ==
Professional ratings
Review scores
Source	Rating
AllMusic	4/5 stars
All About Jazz	4/5 stars
The Penguin Guide to Jazz Recordings	3/4 stars

The AllMusic review by Thom Jurek says "Playground is an exciting new chapter in Katche's evolution as a leader; but more than this, bodes well for the future of jazz: it never loses sight of itself, but moves the various threads of its subgenres further without stretching any of them to the breaking point."

In JazzTimes Jeff Tamarkin wrote "Manu Katché must be the least egotistical drummer on the planet. Although he’s rarely out of earshot on Playground, and the vision is clearly his, there’s not a moment when he hogs the spotlight ... most of the star turns go to the Norwegian hornmen, Trygve Seim on tenor and soprano saxophones and trumpeter Mathias Eick, and to the Polish pianist, Marcin Wasilewski. But they too keep things in check, and Playground, despite brief flashes of intensity, often teeters toward the smooth-jazz chasm—it never quite falls in, but it comes awfully close."

On All About Jazz John Kelman noted "Playground is, like its predecessor, first and foremost an outstandingly honest record and proves, yet again, that accessible music needn't be lightweight or predictable."

== Track listing ==
All tracks are written by Manu Katché.

No.	Title	Length
1.	"Lo"	6:25
2.	"Pieces of Emotion"	4:13
3.	"Song for Her"	6:24
4.	"So Groovy"	5:50
5.	"Morning Joy"	5:27
6.	"Motion"	5:14
7.	"Project 58"	6:13
8.	"Snapshot"	4:53
9.	"Possible Thought"	6:03
10.	"Inside Game"	5:06
11.	"Clubbing"	7:03
12.	"Song for Her (Var.)"	6:22

== Personnel ==
=== Musicians ===
- Manu Katché – drums
- Mathias Eick – trumpet
- Trygve Seim – tenor and soprano saxophones
- Marcin Wasilewski – piano
- Slawomir Kurkiewicz – bass
- David Torn – guitar (tracks 1 & 12)

=== Technical personnel ===
- Manfred Eicher – producer
- James A. Farber – recording engineer
- Sascha Kleis – design
- Darius Khondji – photography
