= Andina =

Andina, meaning Andean, may refer to:

== Animals ==
- Acraga andina, a moth of family Dalceridae
- Agrotis andina, a moth of family Noctuidae
- Colobothea andina, a beetle of family Cerambycidae
- Euxesta andina, a fly of family Ulidiidae
- Mordella andina, a beetle of family Mordellidae
- Ommata andina, a beetle of family Cerambycidae
- Orthocomotis andina, a moth of family Tortricidae
- Stigmella andina, a moth of family Nepticulidae

== Plants ==
- Acalypha andina, a plant of family Euphorbiaceae
- Mimosa andina, a legume of family Fabaceae
- Muhlenbergia andina, a grass of family Poaceae
- Neoholmgrenia andina, a flower of family Onagraceae
- Ochagavia andina, a plant of family Bromeliaceae
- Passiflora andina, a plant of family Passifloraceae
- Polybotrya andina, a fern of family Elaphoglossaceae
- Prumnopitys andina, an evergreen coniferous tree of family Podocarpaceae
- Vellozia andina, a plant of family Velloziaceae
- Xyris andina, a plant of family Xyridaceae

== Other organisms ==
- Andina (lichen), a lichen genus in the family Teloschistaceae

== Other uses ==
- Andina mine or División Andina, a copper mine in Central Chile
- Andina (album), a 1988 album by Argentine musician Dino Saluzzi
- Andina, Ambositra, a commune in Amoron'i Mania Region, Madagascar
- Andina (news agency), an agency owned by the Peruvian government
- Andina de Televisión or ATV (Peru), a Peruvian television network
- Fernando Andina (born 1976), Spanish actor
