= The Astounding Eyes of Rita =

Studio album by Anouar Brahem
- Released: September 25, 2009
- Recorded: October 2008
- Studio: Artesuono Studio; Udine, Italy
- Genre: Jazz
- Length: 52:17
- Label: ECM; ECM 2075
- Producer: Manfred Eicher

Anouar Brahem chronology
Le voyage de Sahar (2006)	The Astounding Eyes of Rita (2009)	Souvenance (2014)

The Astounding Eyes of Rita is an album by Tunisian oud player and composer Anouar Brahem recorded for ECM in Italy, October 2008 and released on September 25, 2009.

== Reception ==
Professional ratings
Review scores
Source	Rating
The Guardian	4/5 stars

Writing for The Guardian, reviewer John Fordham observed "In recent years, Brahem's work has been more refined and reflective than groove-inclined, but this vivacious quartet set marks a return to the chemistry of Thimar, and it's a richly varied and often thrilling piece of world-jazz."

Writing for All About Jazz, John Kelman noted "After two discs of sparer chamber music, it's great to hear Brahem back with a pulse; but with Meyer, Gesing, and Yassine as partners, he's retained the elusive mystery of albums like Le pas du chat noir (2002), making The Astounding Eyes of Rita his most aesthetically unified album to date."

== Track listing ==
All tracks are written by Anouar Brahem.

No.	Title	Length
1.	"The Lover of Beirut"	7:44
2.	"Dance with Waves"	3:56
3.	"Stopover at Djibouti"	6:34
4.	"The Astounding Eyes of Rita"	8:41
5.	"Al Birwa"	4:51
6.	"Galilee mon amour"	7:17
7.	"Waking State"	7:48
8.	"For No Apparent Reason"	6:35
Total length:		52:17

== Personnel ==
=== Musicians ===
- Anouar Brahem – oud
- Klaus Gesing – bass clarinet
- Björn Meyer – bass
- Khaled Yassine – darbouka, bendir

=== Technical personnel ===
- Manfred Eicher – producer
- Stefano Amerio – engineer
  - Lara Persia – assistant engineer
- Sascha Kleis – design
- Fouad Elkoury – cover photography
- Luca D'Agostino – liner photography
- Mahmoud Darwish – poem in booklet
