= Blue Maqams =

Studio album by Anouar Brahem
- Released: October 13, 2017
- Recorded: May 2017
- Studios: Avatar (New York, New York)
- Genre: Jazz
- Length: 1:16:49
- Labels: ECM; ECM 2580
- Producer: Manfred Eicher

Anouar Brahem chronology
Souvenance (2014)	Blue Maqams (2017)	After the Last Sky (2025)

Blue Maqams is a studio album by Tunisian oud player and composer Anouar Brahem, recorded in New York in May 2017 and released on ECM October that same year. The quartet features rhythm section Dave Holland and Jack DeJohnette alongside pianist Django Bates.

== Reception ==
Professional ratings
Review scores
Source	Rating
AllMusic	4/5 stars
The Guardian	4/5 stars
All About Jazz	4.5/5 stars
RTÉ	5/5 stars
Financial Times	4/5 stars

The album received wide acclaim around the world.

In DownBeat, Bobby Reed wrote "The result is a program that features traditional music from Arab culture as well as more modern jazz elements. The word 'maqam' refers here to Arabic melodic art, but also to Iraqi maqam, as practiced by master oud player Munir Bashir. Each musician shines here."

On AllMusic, Thom Jurek observed "Blue Maqams is lovely. It's a nearly perfect illustration of balance between cultural and musical inquiry, underscored by the confidence and near symbiotic communication of this gifted ensemble. This is an exceptional outing, even for an artist as accomplished and creative as Brahem."

Writing for The Guardian reviewer John Fordham stated "Brahem’s oud often sketches in the themes, sometimes shadowed by the others in dreamy twilight reflections, more often accelerating into languidly swaying nightwalks such as the title track. Spanish-tinged guitar-like jams end in drum flurries, while thumping Holland bass vamps release scintillating jazz breakouts ... It’s a real meeting of hearts and minds."

Writing for All About Jazz, Mark Sullivan noted "This is the closest thing to a jazz recording Brahem has made—but it is still completely his own vision, aided by an exceptionally sympathetic group of players."

RTÉ reviewer Paddy Kehoe called it "Entrancing, essential stuff" declaring "Tunisian oud master Anouar Brahem marries the resonant stringed instrument of that name skilfully and intuitively in a glorious collaboration with the work of bassist Dave Holland, drummer Jack DeJohnette and pianist Django Bates on Blue Maqams. Shifting and rolling along in the seductive current, the original native Maghreb thread is never lost in the tentatively subtle explorations at play on this album."

Financial Times' writer David Honigmann called it "Brahem’s best set since Le pas du chat noir."

== Track listing ==
All tracks are written by Anouar Brahem.

No.	Title	Length
1.	"Opening Day"	7:01
2.	"La Nuit"	10:28
3.	"Blue Maqams"	8:41
4.	"Bahia"	8:45
5.	"La passante"	4:05
6.	"Bom dia Rio"	9:23
7.	"Persepolis's Mirage"	8:06
8.	"The Recovered Road to Al-Sham"	9:26
9.	"Unexpected Outcome"	10:59
Total length:		1:16:49

== Personnel ==
- Anouar Brahem – oud
- Django Bates – piano
- Dave Holland – bass
- Jack DeJohnette – drums
