= Conte de l'incroyable amour =

Studio album by Anouar Brahem
- Released: May 1992
- Recorded: October 1991
- Studios: Rainbow Studio; Oslo, Norway
- Genre: Jazz
- Length: 59:20
- Labels: ECM; ECM 1457
- Producer: Manfred Eicher

Anouar Brahem chronology
Barzakh (1990)	Conte de l'incroyable amour (1992)	Madar (1992)

Conte de l'incroyable amour (French: "Tale of Incredible Love") is the second album by Tunisian oud player Anouar Brahem, recorded in October 1991 and released on ECM May the following year. The quartet features woodwind players Barbaros Erköse and Kudsi Erguner and percussionist Lassad Hosni.

== Reception ==
The AllMusic review by Stephen Cook awarded the album 3 stars calling it "A wonderful album that, upon repeated listening, reveals many transcendent moments."

Professional ratings
Review scores
Source	Rating
AllMusic	3/5 stars

== Track listing ==
All tracks are written by Anouar Brahem, except as noted.

No.	Title	Writer(s)	Length
1.	"Etincelles"		3:21
2.	"Le chien sur les genoux de la devineresse"		3:44
3.	"L'oiseau de bois"		4:48
4.	"Lumière du silence"		5:15
5.	"Conte de l'incroyable amour"		10:51
6.	"Peshrev Hidjaz Homayoun"	Veli Dede	5:03
7.	"Diversion"	Kudsi Erguner	5:39
8.	"Nayzak"		5:32
9.	"Battements"		1:56
10.	"En souvenir d'Iram"		3:02
11.	"Iram retrouvée"		3:48
12.	"Epilogue"		6:21

== Personnel ==
- Anouar Brahem – oud
- Barbaros Erköse – clarinet
- Kudsi Erguner – ney
- Lassad Hosni – bendir, darbouka
