= Volver (disambiguation) =

Volver is a 2006 Spanish drama film written and directed by Pedro Almodóvar with actress Penélope Cruz.

Volver may also refer to:

- Volver (tango)
- Volver (Enrico Rava / Dino Saluzzi Quintet album)
- Volver (Plácido Domingo album), 2018
