= El Encuentro (Dino Saluzzi album) =

Live album by Dino Saluzzi
- Released: May 14, 2010
- Recorded: February 13, 2009
- Genre: Jazz
- Length: 68:57
- Label: ECM; ECM 2155
- Producer: Manfred Eicher

Dino Saluzzi chronology
| Ojos Negros (2006) | El Encuentro (2010) | Navidad de Los Andes (2010) |

El Encuentro is a live album by Argentine bandoneón player and composer Dino Saluzzi with cellist Anja Lechner and the Metropole Orchestra recorded on February 13, 2009, and released by ECM on February 13, 2009.

== Reception ==
Professional ratings
Review scores
| Source | Rating |
|---|---|
| AllMusic | 4/5 stars |

The AllMusic review by Thom Jurek states, "El Encuentro ('The Meeting') is a series of musical short stories that ultimately become an entire narrative."

The All About Jazz review by John Kelman states, "El Encuentro, Saluzzi's first live recording, expands on its antecedents both in scope and palette."

The JazzTimes review by Mike Joyce states, "Those who enjoy Saluzzi’s collaborations with his brother, tenor saxophonist Felix Saluzzi, and cellist Anja Lechner won’t be disappointed by their soulful and lyrical contributions, or the skill with which they develop independent voices that color and sustain the composer’s signature narrative threads."

== Track listing ==
All compositions by Dino Saluzzi

1. "Vals de los días" – 15:29
2. "Plegaria andina" – 17:14
3. "El encuentro" – 21:44
4. "Miserere" – 14:30

== Personnel ==
- Dino Saluzzi – bandoneón
- Anja Lechner – cello (tracks 1–3)
- Felix "Cuchara" Saluzzi – tenor saxophone (track 2)
- Jules Buckley – conductor
  - Metropole Orchestra
