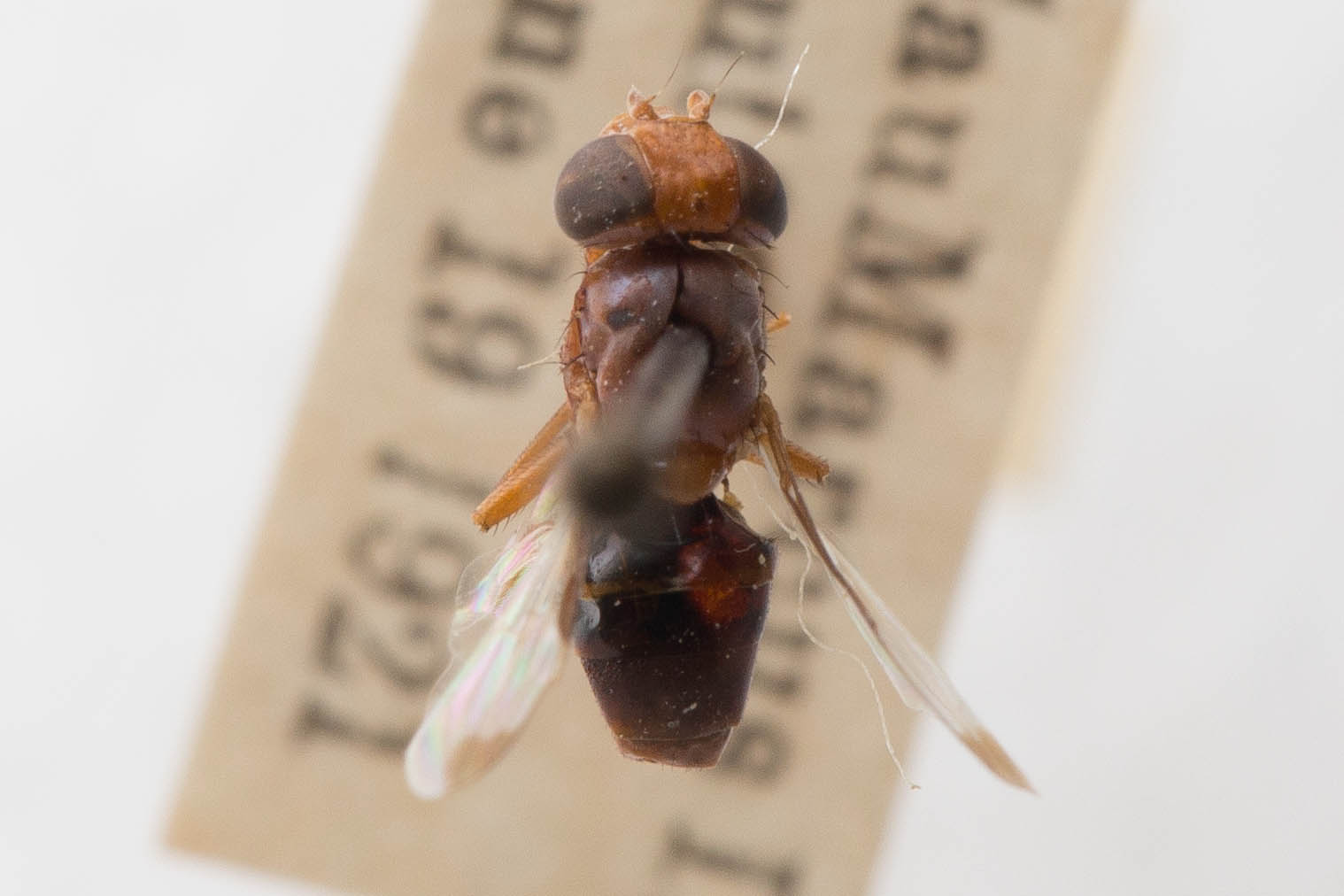
- Acrosticta rubida

Scientific classification
- Kingdom: Animalia
- Phylum: Arthropoda
- Clade: Pancrustacea
- Class: Insecta
- Order: Diptera
- Family: Ulidiidae
- Tribe: Lipsanini
- Genus: Acrosticta

= Acrosticta =

Genus of flies

Acrosticta is a genus of picture-winged flies in the family Ulidiidae. An unknown member of this genus was the only successful pollinator of Acianthera aphthosa.

== Species ==
- Acrosticta andina (Brèthes, 1922)
- Acrosticta apicalis (Williston, 1896)
- Acrosticta compta (Cole, 1912)
- Acrosticta dichroa Loew, 1874
- Acrosticta fiebrigi Lindner, 1928
- Acrosticta foveolata Loew, 1868
- Acrosticta fulvicornis (Bigot, 1886)
- Acrosticta fulvipes Coquillett, 1900
- Acrosticta profunda Hendel, 1909
- Acrosticta riojana (Brèthes, 1922)
- Acrosticta rubida (Loew, 1876)
- Acrosticta ruficauda Hendel, 1909
- Acrosticta rufiventris Hendel, 1910
- Acrosticta scrobiculata Loew, 1868
- Acrosticta wytsmani Hendel, 1910

Synonyms

- Acrosticta mexicana; valid as A. rufiventris
