= Navidad de Los Andes =

Navidad de los Andes

Studio album by Dino Saluzzi
- Released: 2011
- Recorded: July 2010
- Venue: Auditorio Radiotelevisione Svizzera; Lugano, Switzerland
- Genre: Jazz
- Length: 60:24
- Label: ECM; ECM 2204
- Producer: Manfred Eicher

Dino Saluzzi chronology
El Encuentro (2009)	Navidad de los Andes (2011)

Navidad de los Andes is an album by Argentine bandoneon player and composer Dino Saluzzi with cellist Anja Lechner and saxophonist Felix Saluzzi recorded in 2010 and released on the ECM label.

== Reception ==
The AllMusic review by Thom Jurek awarded the album 4 stars stating "While the music here is often brooding, it is never less than poetic, and often approaches the sublime."

Professional ratings
Review scores
Source	Rating
Allmusic	4/5 stars

== Track listing ==
All compositions by Dino Saluzzi except as indicated

1. "Flor de Tuna" - 7:39
2. "Sucesos" - 6:47
3. "Fragments" - 3:36
4. "Son Qo'ñati" - 3:40
5. "Requerdos de Bohemia" (Enrique Delfino, Manuel Romero) - 7:45
6. "Gabriel Kondor" - 6:01
7. "El vals de nostros" (Carlos Aparicio, Saluzzi) - 3:22
8. "Candor/Soledad" (Carlos Gardel, Saluzzi) - 4:07
9. "Variaciones sobre una melodía popular de José L. Padula" - 6:58
10. "Ronda de niños en la montaña" - 5:15
11. "Otoño" - 5:18

== Personnel ==
- Dino Saluzzi — bandoneón
- Anja Lechner — cello
- Felix Saluzzi — tenor saxophone
