= Anwar Ibraheem =

Anwar Ibraheem may refer to:

- Anouar Brahem, Tunisian musician
- Anwar Ibrahim, Malaysian politician
