= Souvenance =

Studio album by Anouar Brahem
- Released: November 28, 2014
- Recorded: May 2014
- Studio: Auditorio Stelio Molo RSI; Lugano, Switzerland
- Genre: Jazz
- Length: 1:29:08
- Label: ECM; ECM 2423/24
- Producer: Manfred Eicher

Anouar Brahem chronology
The Astounding Eyes of Rita (2009)	Souvenance (2014)	Blue Maqams (2017)

Professional ratings
Review scores
Source	Rating
All About Jazz	4/5 stars

Souvenance is the first double album by Tunisian oud player Anouar Brahem, recorded in May 2014 and released on ECM a few months later on November 28.

== Composition ==
The album was written during the Arab Spring in Tunisia, Brahem says about this that "I had to wait for the pressure to fall, before I could resume work." and that "I don’t claim a direct link between my compositions and the events that have taken place in Tunisia [...] but I was deeply affected by them."

== Track listing ==
All music is composed by Anouar Brahem

Disc one
No.	Title	Length
1.	"Improbable Day"	12:41
2.	"Ashen Sky"	7:36
3.	"Delivrance"	5:07
4.	"Souvenance"	9:16
5.	"Tunis at Dawn"	6:42
6.	"Youssef's Song"	10:23

Disc two
No.	Title	Length
1.	"January"	7:19
2.	"Like a Dream"	9:40
3.	"On the Road"	7:59
4.	"Kasserine"	9:35
5.	"Nouvelle Vague"	2:40
Total length:		1:28:58

== Personnel ==
- Anouar Brahem – oud
- François Couturier – piano
- Klaus Gesing – bass clarinet
- Björn Meyer – bass
- Orchestra della Svizzera Italiana - Pietro Mianiti
