= Anouar Brahem =

Tunisian oud player and composer

Anouar Brahem أنور براهم
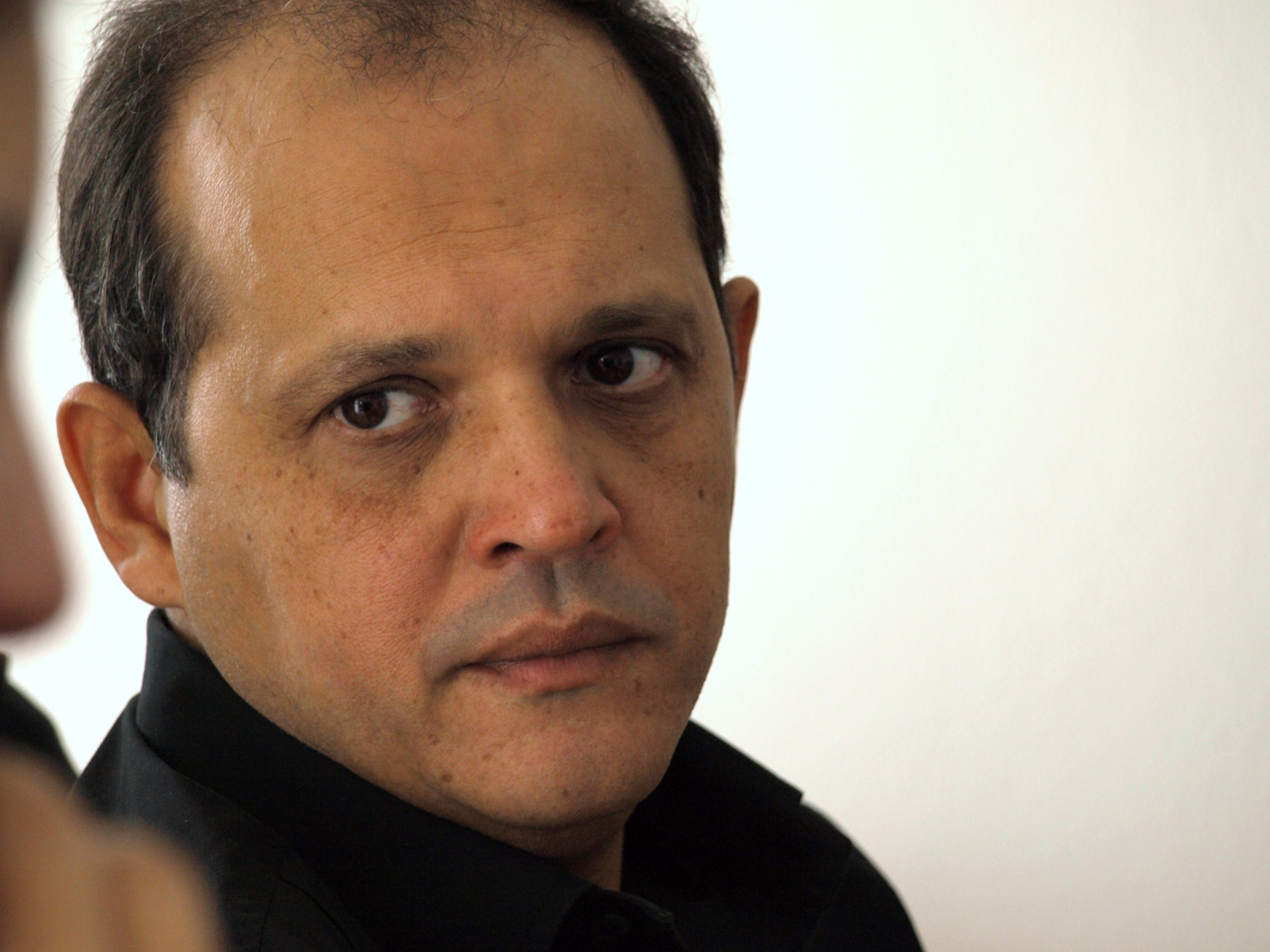

Background information
- Birth name: Anouar Brahem
- Born: 20 October 1957 (age 67); Medina of Tunis, Tunisia
- Origin: Tunis, Tunisia
- Genres: Jazz fusion
- Occupation(s): Oud Player, Musician, Artist, Composer
- Instrument: Oud
- Years active: 1981? – present
- Labels: ECM
- Website: www.anouarbrahem.com

Anouar Brahem (Arabic: أنور براهم; born on 20 October 1957) is a Tunisian oud player and composer. He is widely acclaimed as an innovator in his field. Performing primarily for a jazz audience, he combines Arabic classical music, folk music and jazz and has been recording since at least 1991, after becoming prominent in his own country in the late 1980s.

== Biography ==
Brahem was born and raised in the Halfaouine neighbourhood in the Medina of Tunis, Tunisia. He studied oud at Tunisia's National Conservatory of Music and after that with oud master Ali Sriti. In 1981, he left for Paris in search of new vistas. This enabled him to meet musicians from a variety of genres. He remained there for four years, notably composing music for Tunisian cinema and theatre. He collaborated with Maurice Béjart for his ballet Thalassa Mare Nostrum and with Gabriel Yared as lutist for Costa Gavras’ film Hanna K..

After a period back in Tunisia in the late 1980s, when Brahem was appointed director of the Ensemble musical de la ville de Tunis, he toured in the United States and Canada and then signed with ECM Records, with whom he has recorded a series of critically acclaimed albums. These include Thimar, recorded with saxophonist John Surman and bassist Dave Holland.

Along with oud virtuosos Rabih Abou-Khalil and Dhafer Youssef, Brahem has helped establish the oud as an important instrument of Ethno jazz. Most often he plays in an ensemble of three or four other musicians. He has collaborated throughout his career and on several albums with other musicians: Tunisian percussionist Lassad Hosni and violinist Bechir Selmi and Turkish clarinetist Barbaros Erköse. He has also performed live concerts with these same ensembles.

Anouar released Blue Maqams in 2017 with a band that included Jack DeJohnette, Dave Holland, and Django Bates.

== Selected discography ==
=== As leader ===
| Year | Album | Peak positions | | | | Notes |
| Year | Album | BEL (Fl) | BEL (Wa) | FRA | SWI | Notes |
|---|---|---|---|---|---|---|
| 1991 | Barzakh | | | | | with Lassad Hosni and Bechir Selmi |
| 1992 | Conte de l'incroyable amour | | | | | with Barbaros Erköse |
| 1995 | Khomsa | | | | | with Richard Galliano, Bechir Selmi and François Couturier |
| 1998 | Thimar | | | | | with John Surman and Dave Holland |
| 2000 | Astrakan Café (as Anouar Brahem Trio) | | | | | with Barbaros Erköse and Lassad Hosni |
| 2002 | Le Pas du chat noir | | | 86 | | with François Couturier and Jean-Louis Matinier |
| 2006 | Le Voyage de Sahar | 89 | | 89 | | with François Couturier and Jean-Louis Matinier |
| 2009 | The Astounding Eyes of Rita | 81 | 89 | 84 | | with Klaus Gesing, Björn Meyer and Khaled Yassine |
| 2014 | Souvenance | 43 | 75 | 64 | 82 | with Francois Couturier, Klaus Gesing and Björn Meyer |
| 2017 | Blue Maqams | 40 | 62 | 51 | 23 | with Jack DeJohnette, Dave Holland and Django Bates |
| 2025 | After the Last Sky | | | | | with Dave Holland, Django Bates, and Anja Lechner |

=== Soundtracks ===
- 1994: The Silences of the Palace with Sonia Laraissi
- 2010 : ‘’You Never Left” 8m video by Youssef Nabil
- 2015: ‘’I Saved My Belly Dancer ‘’ 12m video by Youssef Nabil

=== Collaborations ===
- 1994: Madar with Jan Garbarek and Ustad Shaukat Hussain.
- 2002: Charmediterranéen with Orchestre National de Jazz and Gianluigi Trovesi.
