= Ojos Negros (Dino Saluzzi album) =

Studio album by Dino Saluzzi
- Released: 2007
- Recorded: April 2006
- Studio: Kulturbuehne AmBach; Goetzis, Austria
- Genre: Jazz
- Length: 57:40
- Label: ECM; ECM 1991
- Producer: Manfred Eicher

Dino Saluzzi chronology
Juan Condori (2005)	Ojos Negros (2007)	El Encuentro (2009)

Ojos Negros is an album by Argentine bandoneón player and composer Dino Saluzzi with cellist Anja Lechner, recorded in April 2006 and released on ECM the following year.

== Reception ==
The AllMusic review by Michael G. Nastos awarded the album 4 stars stating "It's not a happy music in the strictest sense, but displays an inward joy not readily discernible. So as a listener, you are required to pay close attention to not only the sounds produced by these two extraordinary musicians, but also to the warmth and slowed beat of your heart."

Professional ratings
Review scores
Source	Rating
Allmusic	4/5 stars

== Track listing ==
All compositions by Dino Saluzzi

1. "Tango a Mi Padre" – 4:16
2. "Minguito" – 6:56
3. "Esquina" – 8:38
4. "Duetto" – 6:00
5. "Ojos Negros" – 5:48
6. "El Títere" – 10:15
7. "Carretas" – 6:25
8. "Serenata" – 8:43

== Personnel ==
- Dino Saluzzi – bandoneón
- Anja Lechner – cello
