= Astrakan café =

Studio album by the Anouar Brahem Trio
- Released: September 18, 2000
- Recorded: June 1999
- Studio: Prostei Sankt Gerold; Sankt Gerold, Austria
- Genre: Jazz
- Length: 1:17:42
- Label: ECM; ECM 1718
- Producer: Manfred Eicher

Anouar Brahem chronology
Thimar (1998)	Astrakan café (2000)	Le pas du chat noir (2002)

Astrakan café is an album by Tunisian oud player Anouar Brahem, recorded for ECM at the Propstei Sankt Gerold, Austria in June 1999 and released on September 18, 2000. Brahem's trio features clarinetist Barbaros Erköse and percussionist Lassad Hosni.

== Reception ==
Professional ratings
Review scores
Source	Rating
AllMusic	4.5/5 stars

The AllMusic review by Thom Jurek called it "deeply personal, profound music. It is also highly iconographic, with timelessness woven through every measure.... This would be traditional music if a tradition such as this—which is original, though adapted from many sources on inspiration—actually existed. Highly recommended."

== Track listing ==
All tracks are written by Anouar Brahem except as indicated.

No.	Title	Writer(s)	Length
1.	"Aube rouge à Grozny"	Barbaros Erköse	4:22
2.	"Astrakan café Part 1"		3:18
3.	"The Mozdok's Train"		4:46
4.	"Blue Jewels"		8:31
5.	"Nihawend Lunga"	Cemil Bey	3:32
6.	"Ashkabad"	Anouar Brahem; Erköse; Lassad Hosni	5:38
7.	"Halfaouine"		5:57
8.	"Parfum de Gitane"		7:03
9.	"Khotan"		3:31
10.	"Karakoum"		5:08
11.	"Astara"		10:46
12.	"Dar es Salam"		3:47
13.	"Hijaz Pechref"	Brahem; Osman Bey (Fragment)	6:24
14.	"Astrakan café Part 2"		4:49
Total length:			1:17:42

== Personnel ==
=== Anouar Brahem Trio ===
- Anouar Brahem – oud
- Barbaros Erköse – clarinet
- Lassad Hosni – bendir, darbouka

=== Technical personnel ===
- Manfred Eicher – producer
- Markus Heiland – recording engineer
- Sascha Kleis – cover design
- Gérald Minkoff – cover photography
- Dorian Shaw, Moncef Fehri – liner photography
- Paolo Scarnecchia – liner notes
  - Alastair McEwen – liner note translation
