= Acrosticta fulvicornis =

Scientific classification
- Kingdom: Animalia
- Phylum: Arthropoda
- Clade: Pancrustacea
- Class: Insecta
- Order: Diptera
- Family: Ulidiidae
- Genus: Acrosticta
- Species: A. fulvicornis

Binomial name
- Acrosticta fulvicornis (Bigot, 1886)

Synonyms
- Cephalia fulvicornis Bigot, 1886; Euxesta fulvicornis (Bigot, 1886)

Species of fly

Acrosticta fulvicornis is a species of picture-winged fly in the genus Acrosticta of the family Ulidiidae. It was described by Jacques Marie François Bigot in 1886.
