= Responsorium (album) =

Studio album by Dino Saluzzi
- Released: 2003
- Recorded: November 2001
- Studio: Rainbow Studio; Oslo, Norway
- Genre: Jazz
- Length: 63:24
- Label: ECM; ECM 1816
- Producer: Manfred Eicher

Dino Saluzzi chronology
Kultrum: Music for Bandoneon and String Quartet (1999)	Responsorium (2001)	Senderos (2002)

Responsorium is an album by Argentine jazz bandoneonist Dino Saluzzi recorded in November 2001 and released on ECM in 2003. The trio features guitarist José Maria Saluzzi and bassist Palle Danielsson.

== Reception ==
Professional ratings
Review scores
Source	Rating
AllMusic	4/5 stars

The AllMusic review awarded by Scott Yanow awarded the album 4 stars stating "The mood is sometimes wistful and nostalgic, but it is not derivative of the past. A delightful set."

The JazzTimes review by Thomas Conrad stated "Saluzzi's compositions on Responsorium are melodically rich, but their first impression of simplicity is deceptive."

== Track listing ==
All tracks are written by Dino Saluzzi

No.	Title	Length
1.	"A mi hermano Celso"	8:05
2.	"Mónica"	8:21
3.	"Responso por la muerte de cruz"	9:07
4.	"Dele..., Don!!"	7:42
5.	"Los hijos de fierro (Reprise)"	2:19
6.	"La pequeña historia de...!"	7:05
7.	"Cuchara"	7:43
8.	"Vienen del Sur los recuerdos"	6:33
9.	"Pampeana "Mapu""	6:29

== Personnel ==
- Dino Saluzzi – bandoneón
- José Maria Saluzzi – acoustic guitar
- Palle Danielsson – double bass
