= Ommata nigricollis =

Scientific classification
- Kingdom: Animalia
- Phylum: Arthropoda
- Class: Insecta
- Order: Coleoptera
- Suborder: Polyphaga
- Infraorder: Cucujiformia
- Family: Cerambycidae
- Genus: Ommata
- Species: O. nigricollis

Binomial name
- Ommata nigricollis Santos-Silva, Martins & Clarke, 2010

Species of beetle

Ommata nigricollis is a species of beetle in the family Cerambycidae. It was described by Santos-Silva, Martins and Clarke in 2010.
