= Barzakh (album) =

Studio album by Anouar Brahem
- Released: 1991
- Recorded: September 1990
- Studios: Rainbow Studio; Oslo, Norway
- Genre: Jazz
- Length: 56:53
- Labels: ECM; ECM 1432
- Producer: Manfred Eicher

Anouar Brahem chronology
Barzakh (1991)	Conte de l'Incroyable Amour (1991)

Barzakh is the debut album by Tunisian oud player Anouar Brahem, recorded in September 1990 and released on ECM the following year. The trio features violinist Béchir Selmi and percussionist Lassad Hosni.

== Reception ==
Professional ratings
Review scores
Source	Rating
AllMusic	4.5/5 stars

The AllMusic review by Stephen Cook awarded the album 4½ stars stating, "This is a great title for fans of both international music and jazz."

== Track listing ==
All tracks are written by Anouar Brahem, except as noted.

No.	Title	Writer(s)	Length
1.	"Raf Raf"		3:33
2.	"Barzakh"	Brahem; Selmi	11:02
3.	"Sadir"		6:32
4.	"Ronda"		3:07
5.	"Hou"		1:33
6.	"Sarandib"		2:48
7.	"Souga"	Hosni	2:07
8.	"Parfum de gitane"		4:16
9.	"Bou Naouara"	Hosni	2:22
10.	"Kerkenah"		7:30
11.	"La nuit des jeux"		5:29
12.	"Le Belvédère assiege"		4:14
13.	"Qaf"		1:43

== Personnel ==
- Anouar Brahem – oud
- Béchir Selmi – violin
- Lassad Hosni – percussion
