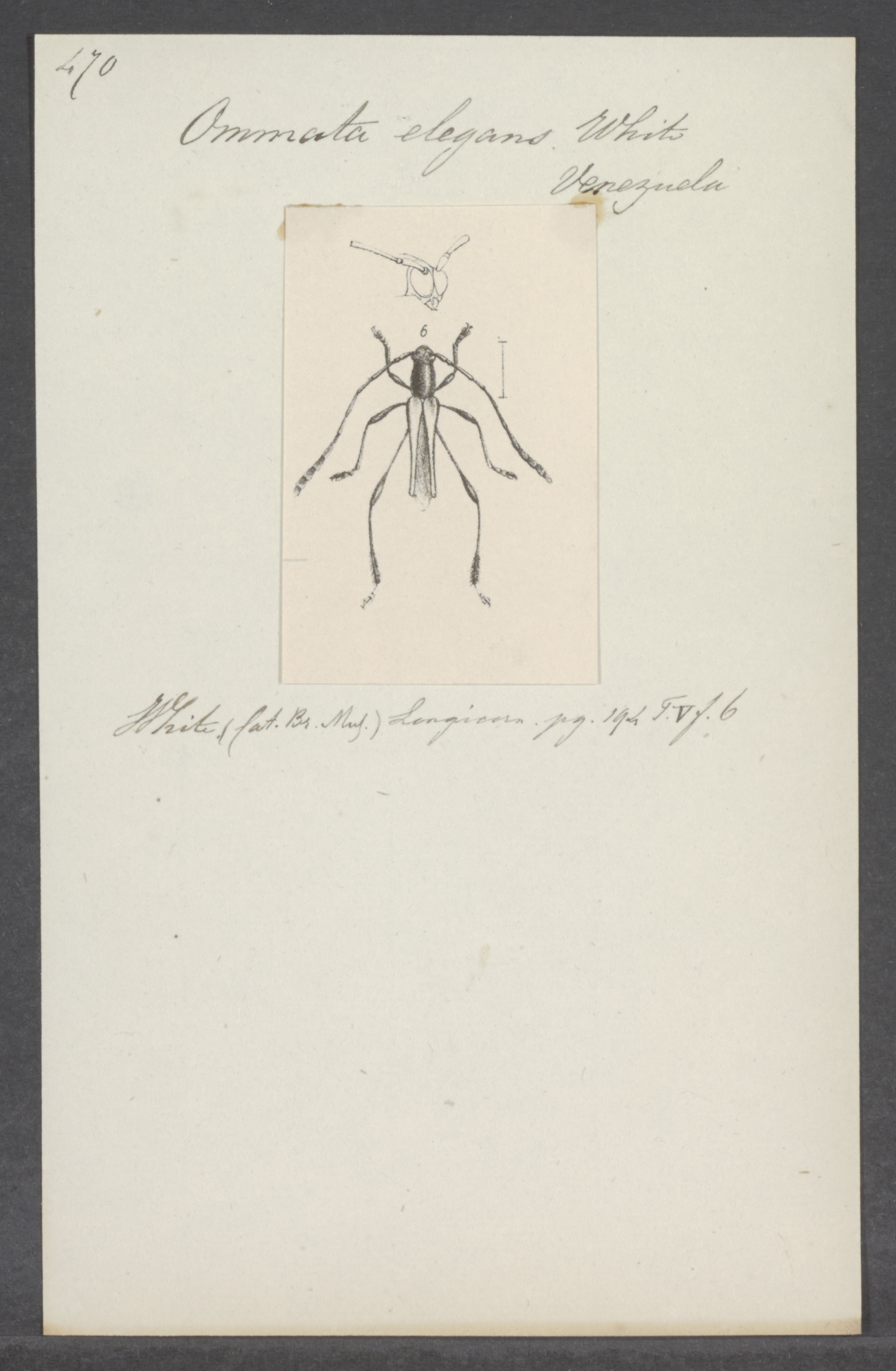

Scientific classification
- Kingdom: Animalia
- Phylum: Arthropoda
- Class: Insecta
- Order: Coleoptera
- Suborder: Polyphaga
- Infraorder: Cucujiformia
- Family: Cerambycidae
- Genus: Ommata
- Species: O. elegans

Binomial name
- Ommata elegans White, 1855

= Ommata elegans =

Species of beetle

Ommata elegans is a species of beetle in the family Cerambycidae. It was described by White in 1855.
