= Le voyage de Sahar =

Studio album by Anouar Brahem
- Released: February 24, 2006
- Recorded: February 2005
- Studio: Auditorio Radio Svizzera; Lugano, Switzerland
- Genre: Jazz
- Length: 63:44
- Label: ECM; ECM 1915
- Producer: Manfred Eicher

Anouar Brahem chronology
Le pas du chat noir (2002)	Le voyage de Sahar (2006)	The Astounding Eyes of Rita (2009)

Le voyage de Sahar is an album by Tunisian oud player Anouar Brahem recorded for ECM in February 2005 and released on February 24, 2006.

== Reception ==
The AllMusic review by Thom Jurek states, "Brahem has given listeners another of his wondrous offerings, full of deceptively simple compositions that open into a secret world, one where beauty is so present that it is nearly unapproachable, and it is up to the listener to fill in the spaces offered them by this remarkable trio."

Professional ratings
Review scores
Source	Rating
AllMusic	4/5 stars

== Track listing ==
All tracks are written by Anouar Brahem

No.	Title	Length
1.	"Sur le fleuve"	6:33
2.	"Le voyage de Sahar"	6:55
3.	"L'Aube"	5:48
4.	"Vague / E la nave va"	6:19
5.	"Les jardins de Ziryab"	4:34
6.	"Nuba"	3:12
7.	"La chambre"	5:01
8.	"Córdoba"	5:30
9.	"Halfaouine"	2:06
10.	"La chambre var."	3:47
11.	"Zarabanda"	4:26
12.	"Été andalous"	7:05
13.	"Vague var."	2:18
Total length:		63:44

== Personnel ==
=== Musicians ===
- Anouar Brahem – oud
- François Couturier – piano
- Jean-Louis Matinier – accordion

=== Technical personnel ===
- Manfred Eicher – producer
- Stefano Amerio – engineer
  - Lara Persia – assistant engineer
- Sascha Kleis – design
- Thomas Wunsch – cover photography
- Luca D'Agostino – liner photography
- CF Wesenberg – interior liner photography
