= Madar (album) =

Studio album by Jan Garbarek / Anouar Brahem / Ustad Shaukat Hussain
- Released: January 1994
- Recorded: August 1992
- Genre: Jazz
- Length: 1:17:34
- Label: ECM; ECM 1515
- Producer: Manfred Eicher

Jan Garbarek chronology
Twelve Moons (1993)	Madar (1994)	Officium (1994)

Anouar Brahem chronology
Conte de l'Incroyable Amour (1992)	Madar (1994)	Khomsa (1995)

Madar is an album by Norwegian saxophonist Jan Garbarek recorded in August 1992 and released on ECM in January 1994. The trio features Tunisian oud player Anouar Brahem—who wrote most of the album—and Pakistani tabla master Ustad Shaukat Hussain.

== Reception ==
Professional ratings
Review scores
Source	Rating
AllMusic	3/5 stars
The Penguin Guide to Jazz Recordings	3/4 stars

The AllMusic review by Scott Yanow awarded the album 3 stars stating, "It may take some time for listeners to get into this music and notice the fire beneath the ice but the close communication between the players is apparent from the start. Jan Garbarek has succeeded in carving out his own unique niche in improvised music and Madar is a good example of how he can create a great deal out of what seems like very little."

== Track listing ==
All tracks are written by Anouar Brahem except as indicated.

No.	Title	Writer(s)	Length
1.	"Sull Lull"	Traditional	16:51
2.	"Madar"	Anouar Brahem; Jan Garbarek	11:14
3.	"Sebika"		5:32
4.	"Bahia"		10:20
5.	"Ramy"		3:00
6.	"Jaw"	Ustad Shaukat Hussain	8:04
7.	"Joron"	Traditional	6:29
8.	"Qaws"	Brahem; Garbarek	15:12
9.	"Epilogue"		0:52

== Personnel ==
- Jan Garbarek – soprano saxophone, tenor saxophone
- Anouar Brahem – oud
- Ustad Shaukat Hussain – tabla
