= Khomsa =

Studio album by Anouar Brahem
- Released: 1995
- Recorded: September 1994
- Studio: Rainbow Studio; Oslo, Norway
- Genre: Jazz
- Length: 1:16:20
- Label: ECM; ECM 1561
- Producer: Manfred Eicher

Anouar Brahem chronology
Madar (1992)	Khomsa (1995)	Thimar (1997)

Khomsa is the third studio album by Tunisian oud player Anouar Brahem, recorded in September 1994 and released on ECM the following year. The septet features accordionist Richard Galliano, pianist François Couturier, saxophonist Jean Marc Larché, violinist Béchir Selmi and rhythm section Palle Danielsson and Jon Christensen.

== Reception ==
Professional ratings
Review scores
Source	Rating
AllMusic	3/5 stars

The AllMusic review by Michael G. Nastos awarded the album 3 stars calling it "a beautiful contemporary statement reflecting the cinematic forms Brahem loves, mixed with European classical and improvisational sensibilities, professionally rendered, and well within the tradition of world jazz and the clean ECM concept."

== Track listing ==
All tracks are written by Anouar Brahem except as indicated.

No.	Title	Writer(s)	Length
1.	"Comme un depart"	Richard Gálliano	3:32
2.	"L'infini jour"		7:31
3.	"Souffle un vent sable"	Brahem; Christensen; Danielsson; Gálliano	10:07
4.	"Regard de Mouette"		1:55
5.	"Sur l'infini bleu"		5:53
6.	"Claquent les voiles"		2:09
7.	"Vague"		2:37
8.	"E la nave va"		4:41
9.	"Ain Ghazel"		7:32
10.	"Khomsa"		7:01
11.	"Seule"		3:39
12.	"Nouvelle vague"		2:38
13.	"En robe d'Olivier"		2:41
14.	"Des rayons et des ombres"	Christensen; Danielsson; Gálliano	8:31
15.	"Un sentier d'alliance"		2:41
16.	"Comme une absence"		3:12
Total length:			1:16:20

== Personnel ==
- Anouar Brahem – oud
- Richard Galliano – accordion
- François Couturier – piano, synthesizer
- Jean Marc Larché – soprano saxophone
- Béchir Selmi – violin
- Palle Danielsson – double bass
- Jon Christensen – drums
