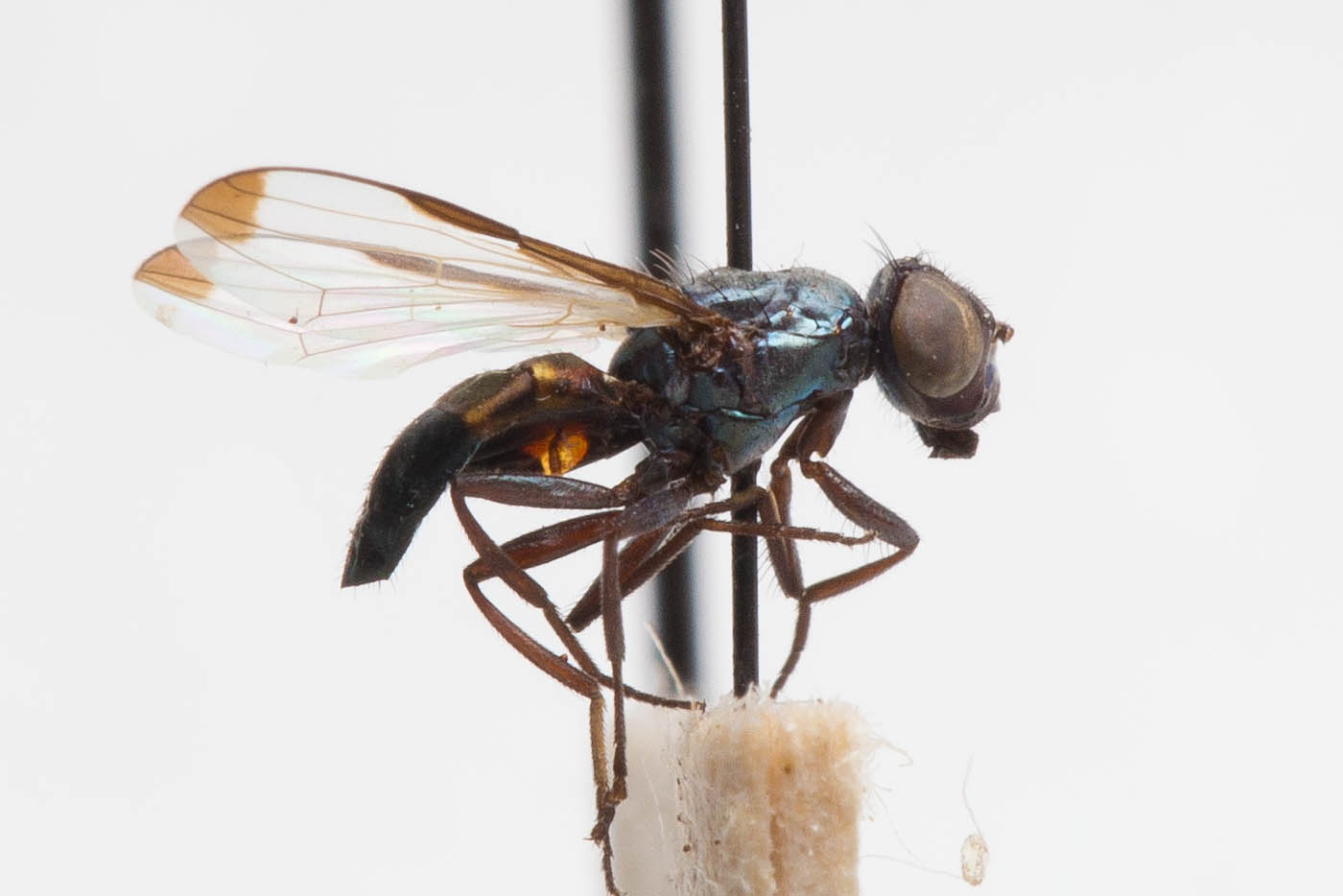

Scientific classification
- Kingdom: Animalia
- Phylum: Arthropoda
- Class: Insecta
- Order: Diptera
- Family: Ulidiidae
- Genus: Acrosticta
- Species: A. dichroa

Binomial name
- Acrosticta dichroa Loew 1874

= Acrosticta dichroa =

Species of fly

Acrosticta dichroa is a species of ulidiid or picture-winged fly in the genus Acrosticta of the family Ulidiidae.
