= Ommata hirtipes =

Scientific classification
- Kingdom: Animalia
- Phylum: Arthropoda
- Class: Insecta
- Order: Coleoptera
- Suborder: Polyphaga
- Infraorder: Cucujiformia
- Family: Cerambycidae
- Genus: Ommata
- Species: O. hirtipes

Binomial name
- Ommata hirtipes Zajciw, 1965

Species of beetle

Ommata hirtipes is a species of beetle in the family Cerambycidae. It was described by Zajciw in 1965.
