= Acrosticta scrobiculata =

Scientific classification
- Kingdom: Animalia
- Phylum: Arthropoda
- Class: Insecta
- Order: Diptera
- Family: Ulidiidae
- Genus: Acrosticta
- Species: A. scrobiculata

Binomial name
- Acrosticta scrobiculata Loew 1868

Species of fly

Acrosticta scrobiculata is a species of ulidiidae or picture-winged fly in the genus Acrosticta of the family Ulidiidae.
