= Mojotoro =

Studio album by Dino Saluzzi
- Released: 1992
- Recorded: May 1991
- Studio: Estudios Ion; Buenos Aires, Argentina
- Genre: Jazz
- Length: 63:24
- Label: ECM; ECM 1447
- Producer: Manfred Eicher

Dino Saluzzi chronology
Andina (1988)	Mojotoro (1992)	Cité de la Musique (1996)

Mojotoro is an album by the Dino Saluzzi Group recorded in May 1991 and released on ECM the following year. The group features bandoneonista Celso Saluzzi, reed player Felix "Cuchara" Saluzzi, rhythm section Armando Alonso, Guillermo Vadalá and José Maria Saluzzi, and percussionist Arto Tuncboyaci.

== Critical reception ==
Professional ratings
Review scores
Source	Rating
AllMusic	3/5 stars

The AllMusic review by Ron Wynn awarded the album 3 stars stating "The music mixes tango with elements of Bolivian and Uruguayan music. There are some beautiful sections, and some uneven ones as well." Andy Hamilton of The Wire described the album as "haunting, beautifully crafted music."

== Track listing ==
All compositions by Dino Saluzzi except as indicated

1. "Mojotoro" - 9:05
2. "Tango a mi padre" - 2:41
3. "Mundos" - 10:58
4. "Lustrin" - 6:17
5. "Viernes santo" - 4:46
6. "Milonga (la puñalada)" (Pintín Castellanos) - 3:41
7. "El camino" - 5:32

== Personnel ==
Dino Saluzzi Group

- Dino Saluzzi – bandoneón, percussion, voice
- Celso Saluzzi – bandoneón, percussion, voice
- Felix "Cuchara" Saluzzi – tenor saxophone, soprano saxophone, clarinet
- Armando Alonso – guitars, voice
- Guillermo Vadalá – electric bass, voice
- José Maria Saluzzi – drums, voice
- Arto Tuncboyaci – percussion, voice
