= Renaud Garcia-Fons =

French upright-bassist and composer

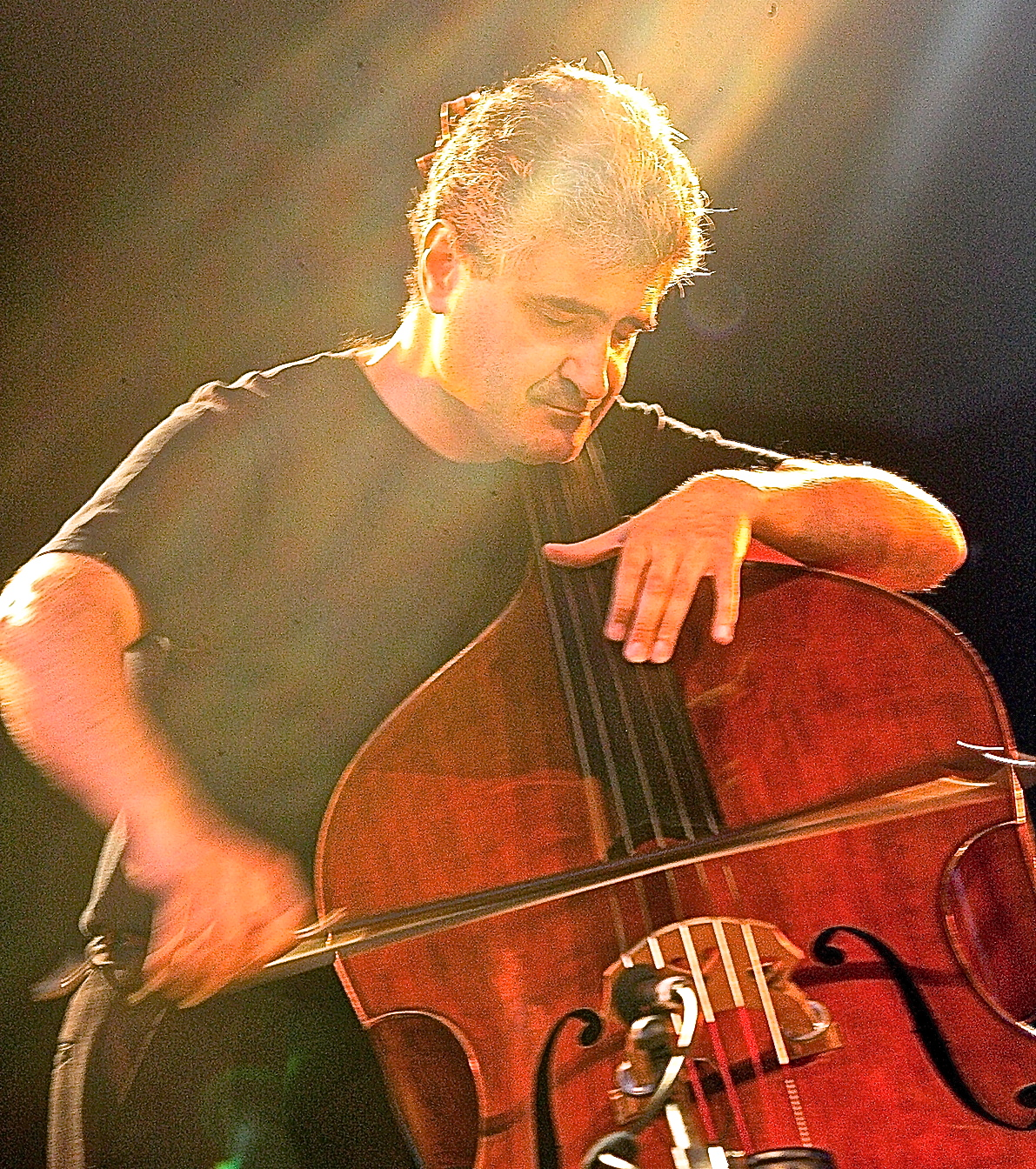
- Renaud Garcia-Fons in concert.

Background information
- Born: Renaud Garcia-Fons; 24 December 1962 (age 63)
- Origin: Paris, France
- Genres: Jazz, World music
- Occupations: Musician, composer
- Instrument: Upright bass
- Label: Enja Records
- Website: renaudgarciafons.com

Renaud Garcia-Fons (born 24 December 1962) is a French bassist and composer.

== Career ==
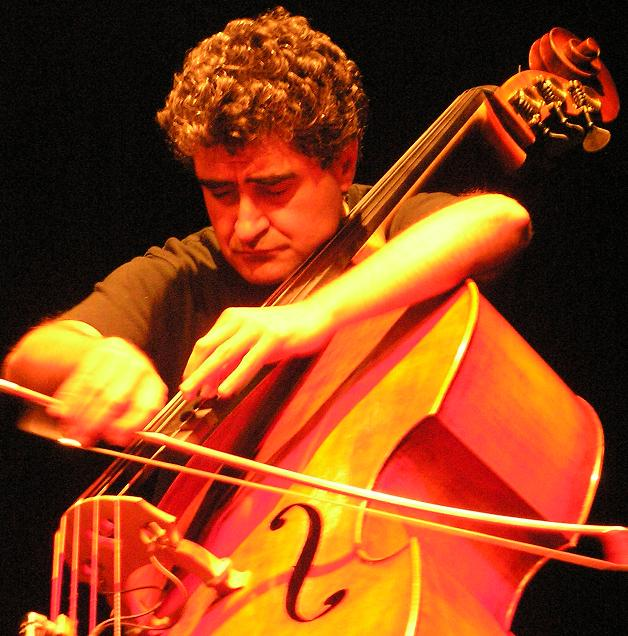
Garcia-Fons

Garcia-Fons started his musical studies at an early age. At five years old he picked up playing the piano, switched to classical guitar at eight, then turned to rock in his teens, and finally settling for the upright bass when he was 16. He got formal musical training at the Conservatoire de Paris, where he studied with François Rabbath, who taught him his special technique of playing arco.

Garcia-Fons is known for his melodic sense and his viola-like col arco sound; he is sometimes referred to as "the Paganini of double bass." Garcia-Fons has been deeply influenced by his mentor, the bassist François Rabbath.

He started playing jazz with the band of trumpeter Roger Guérin, and thereafter had many collaborators, including symphony orchestras, jazz groups, and a trio. In 1987-93, he was part of the French all-double bass ensemble 'L'Orchestre de Contrebasses'. He remained with them for six years, also appearing with the 'Orchestre National de Jazz' directed by Claude Barthélemy during some of this time. Enja Records released his debut solo album Légendes (1992). Alboreá (1995) was his next album release, featuring his quartet including Jean-Louis Matinier (accordion), Jacques Mahieux (drums), and Yves Torchinsky (bass).

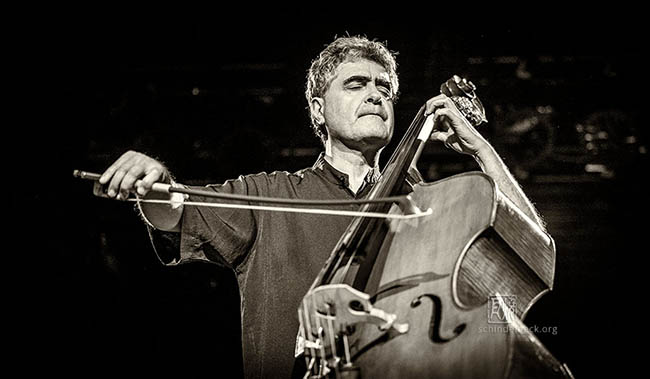
Renaud Garcia-Fons, double bass by Frank Schindelbeck

His third album, 1998's Oriental Bass, featured his own compositions and was well received in the press. Next he combined with accordionist Jean-Louis Matinier on the album Fuera (1999). On many occasions he is accompanied by a variety of instruments, including guitar, lute, derbouka, flutes, trombone, and accordion. Garcia-Fons has collaborated with jazz musicians like Jean-Louis Matinier, Michael Riessler, Sylvain Luc, Nguyên Lê, and Michel Godard, and contributed to recordings of Gerardo Núñez and to Middle Eastern players such as Kudsi Erguner, Dhafer Youssef, and Cheb Mami.

Garcia-Fons is interested in world music, particularly the music of the master of Iranian lute tanbur Ostad Elahi. These works inspire many of his compositions, such as Hommage à Ostad (CD Oriental Bass) and Voyage à Jeyhounabad ( CD / DVD SOLO The Marcevol Concert). His interest in this music leads him in 2019 to participate, at the invitation of the Metropolitan Museum in New York, in a tribute concert organized as an extension of the exhibition: the sacred lute, the art of Ostad Elahi (2014-2015).

In addition to his career as a soloist, Renaud Garcia-Fons has been developing composition work for several years. He writes various pieces for String Quartet at the initiative of France Musique for the program Alla Breve. He creates for the Scottish Chamber Orchestra and the 'Ensemble de Basse-Normandie' Mundus Imaginalis. He is part of the credits for the France Culture program Les Racines du Ciel. On the international scene, he regularly plays with his various groups in the biggest Jazz Festivals. In July 2009, the Montreal International Jazz Festival invited him for a White Card of 3 concerts.

In 2019, he released the duet album Farangi, from the Baroque to the Orient, the fruit of a multi-year collaboration with the lutenist Claire Antonini.

== Honors ==
- 2009: he is awarded the Solo Performance Award by the International Society of Bassists.
- 2010: the Echo Deutscher MuzikPreis Jazz Prize of the best international instrumentalist (bass / guitar), for his album Linea Del Sur and the Giraldillo for musical interpretation at the Seville Biennale for his participation in the show Sin Muros by Dorantes.
- 2011: for the second time, the Echo Deutscher MusikPreis Jazz Prize of the best international instrumentalist (bass / guitar), for his album Méditerranées, designed at the request of Françoise Marchesseau and Frédéric Leibovitz for the Cézame musical illustration label.
- 2012: together with the director Nicolas Dattilesi, the Echo Deutscher MusikPreis prize for the best musical DVD of the year is awarded to him for the SOLO DVD The Marcevol Concert.
- 2013: ECHO Jazz Award "DVD of the Year", for the Solo – The Marcevol Concert.
- 2014: Prize of the best original music at the 2014 Luchon Festival for televisual creations for Marion Sarraut's film Premier été.
- 2017: BMW Welt Jazz Award as well as the Audience Award with his trio La vie devant soi with David Venitucci and Stephan Caracci.

== Discography ==
=== Solo albums ===
- 1992: Légendes (Enja Records)
- 1995: Alboreá (Enja Records)
- 1995: Suite Andalouse (Al Sur), with Pedro Soler
- 1997: Oriental Bass (Enja Records)
- 1999: Fuera (Enja Records), with Jean-Louis Matinier
- 2000: Acoustic Songs (Label Hopi), with Gérard Marais
- 2001: Navigatore (Enja Records)
- 2004: Entremundo (Enja Records)
- 2006: Arcoluz (Enja Records)
- 2009: La Linea Del Sur (Enja Records)
- 2010: Méditerranées (Enja Records)
- 2012: Solo - The Marcevol Concert (Enja Records)
- 2013: Beyond The Double Bass (Enja Records)
- 2014: Silk Moon (e-motive Records), with Derya Türkan
- 2017: La Vie Devant Soi (E-motive Records)
- 2019: Farangi, from Baroque to Orient, in duet with lutenist Claire Antonini, (E-motive Records)
- 2021: Le Souffle des cordes, (E-motive Records)
- 2024: Blue Maqam, (Sound Surveyor Music)

=== Collaborations ===
With Dhafer Youssef

- 1999: Malak (Enja Records), including with Markus Stockhausen, Nguyên Lê, Jatinder Thakur

Within Gianluigi Trovesi Nonet

- 2000: Round About A Midsummer's Dream (Enja Records)

With Antonio Placer, Paulo Bellinati and Jorge Trasante

- 2000: Nomades D'Ici (Le Chant du Monde)

With Nguyên Lê

- 1997: Three Trios (ACT Music)
- 2000: Bakida (ACT Music)
- 2008: Fragile Beauty (ACT Music)

With Gerardo Núñez

- 2000: Jazzpaña II (ACT Music)

With Kudsi Erguner

- 2001: Islam Blues (ACT Music)

With David Peña Dorantes

- 2015: Paseo A Dos (E-Motive Records)
