= Once upon a Time – Far Away in the South =

Studio album by Dino Saluzzi
- Released: 1986
- Recorded: July 1985
- Studio: Tonstudio Bauer; Ludwigsburg, W. Germany
- Genre: Jazz
- Length: 55:10
- Label: ECM 1309
- Producer: Manfred Eicher

Dino Saluzzi chronology
| Kultrum (1982) | Once upon a Time – Far Away in the South (1986) | Volver (1986) |

Once upon a Time – Far Away in the South (stylized: Once upon a time – Far away in the south) is an album by Argentine bandoneón player and composer Dino Saluzzi recorded in 1985 and released on the ECM label. The quartet features trumpeter Palle Mikkelborg and rhythm section Charlie Haden and Pierre Favre.

== Reception ==
The AllMusic review awarded the album 2 stars.

Professional ratings
Review scores
| Source | Rating |
|---|---|
| AllMusic | 2/5 stars |

== Track listing ==
All compositions by Dino Saluzzi except as indicated

1. "Jose, Valeria and Matias" - 12:51
2. "And the Father Said... (Intermediate)" - 1:45
3. "The Revelation (Ritual)" - 5:17
4. "Silence" (Charlie Haden) - 6:49
5. "...and He Loved His Brother, till the End" - 7:47
6. "Far Away in the South..." - 15:52
7. "We Are the Children" (Palle Mikkelborg) - 5:08

== Personnel ==
- Dino Saluzzi – bandoneón
- Palle Mikkelborg – trumpet, fluegelhorn
- Charlie Haden – bass
- Pierre Favre – percussion
