= Horse Lords =

American rock band

- Origin: Baltimore, Maryland, United States
- Genres: Post-rock; krautrock; jazz; avant-garde; experimental rock; math rock
- Years active: 2010–present
- Labels: Northern Spy; RVNG Intl.
- Members: Andrew Bernstein; Max Eilbacher; Owen Gardner; Sam Haberman
- Website: horselords.org

Horse Lords is an American experimental rock band from Baltimore.

The band consists of Andrew Bernstein (saxophone/percussion/electronics), Max Eilbacher (bass/electronics), Owen Gardner (guitar/electronics), and Sam Haberman (drums).

== History ==
According to Discogs the band "plays experimental music with elements of krautrock, post-punk, Appalachian and African musical traditions, polyrhythmia, arcane tunings and electronics. The band uses the just intonation tuning system favored by avantgarde composers La Monte Young and James Tenney, which requires the use of hand-modified guitars with repositioned frets, re-tuned and customized by [band member Owen] Gardner."

Their self-titled debut album was released in 2012, after which the band toured with Matmos, Guerilla Toss, and Guardian Alien, and played festivals such as Hopscotch Music Festival, North by Northeast, and Fields Fest. Their second album, Hidden Cities, was released in 2014.

Pitchfork, reviewing their 2016 album Interventions, wrote that "The Baltimore band has released two albums up to this point, both of which alternate switchbacking studies in rhythm and drone with noisy, knotty studio experiments... Interventions marks a major step forward in every way: The jams are both more focused and more hypnotic, while the quality of the recordings has a newfound clarity and fullness". Ben Ratliff reviewed Interventions for the New York Times, calling it "invigorating" and "daring and energetic", noting that the band were "borrowing sounds and techniques from Mauritanian guitar music, free jazz, classical minimalism and other places" including being "way into hocketing... This music feels very live, shivering with energy".

The band also released The Common Task (2020), Comradely Objects (2022), and Demand to Be Taken to Heaven Alive! (2026).

== Discography ==
=== Studio albums ===
- Horse Lords (Ehse Records, 2012)
- Hidden Cities (NNA Tapes, 2014)
- Interventions (Northern Spy Records, 2016)
- The Common Task (Northern Spy Records, 2020)
- Comradely Objects (RVNG Intl., 2022)
- Extended Field (with Arnold Dreyblatt; RVNG Intl., 2025)
- Demand to Be Taken to Heaven Alive! (RVNG Intl., 2026)

=== Mixtapes ===
- Mixtape Vol. 1 (2012)
- Mixtape Vol. 2 (2013)
- Mixtape Volume 3 (2013)
- Mixtape IV (2017)
