= Ommata =

Scientific classification
- Kingdom: Animalia
- Phylum: Arthropoda
- Class: Insecta
- Order: Coleoptera
- Suborder: Polyphaga
- Infraorder: Cucujiformia
- Family: Cerambycidae
- Subfamily: Cerambycinae
- Tribe: Rhinotragini
- Genus: Ommata; White, 1855

Genus of beetles

Ommata is a genus of beetles in the family Cerambycidae, containing the following species:

- Ommata andina Santos-Silva, Martins & Clarke, 2010
- Ommata buddemeyerae Clarke, 2010
- Ommata elegans White, 1855
- Ommata hirtipes Zajciw, 1965
- Ommata nigricollis Santos-Silva, Martins & Clarke, 2010
- Ommata tibialis Fuchs, 1961
