= Acrosticta apicalis =

Scientific classification
- Kingdom: Animalia
- Phylum: Arthropoda
- Class: Insecta
- Order: Diptera
- Family: Ulidiidae
- Genus: Acrosticta
- Species: A. apicalis

Binomial name
- Acrosticta apicalis (Williston, 1896)

Species of fly

Acrosticta apicalis is a species of ulidiid or picture-winged fly in the genus Acrosticta of the family Ulidiidae.
