= Acrosticta ruficauda =

Scientific classification
- Kingdom: Animalia
- Phylum: Arthropoda
- Class: Insecta
- Order: Diptera
- Family: Ulidiidae
- Genus: Acrosticta
- Species: A. ruficauda

Binomial name
- Acrosticta ruficauda Hendel 1909

Species of fly

Acrosticta ruficauda is a species of ulidiidae or picture-winged fly in the genus Acrosticta of the family Ulidiidae.
