= The Common Task =

Studio album by Horse Lords
- Released: March 13, 2020
- Genre: Experimental rock
- Length: 41:13
- Label: Northern Spy

Horse Lords chronology
Interventions (2016)	The Common Task (2020)	Comradely Objects (2022)

Singles from The Common Task
- 1. "Fanfare for Effective Freedom" Released: January 23, 2020; 2. "People's Park" Released: February 19, 2020

The Common Task is the fourth studio album by American experimental rock band Horse Lords. The album was released on March 13, 2020 through Northern Spy Records.

== Release and promotion ==
=== Singles ===
Two singles were released ahead of The Common Task, the lead single, "Fanfare for Effective Freedom" was released on January 23, 2020 in conjunction with the album's announcement. The second single, "People's Park" came out a month later, on February 19, 2020.

=== Music video ===
On February 18, 2020 the music video for "People's Park" was released, a day prior to the release of the single. The video features ice skaters skating on a rink. The video was directed by Corey Hughes with cinematography undertaken by Melissa Ivester. The music video was recorded at The Gardens Ice House in Laurel, Maryland.

== Critical reception ==
Professional ratings
Aggregate scores
Source	Rating
Album of the Year	80/100
Metacritic	83/100
Review scores
Source	Rating
AllMusic	4/5 stars
Dusted	4/5 stars
Mojo	4/5 stars
The Needle Drop	8/10
Pitchfork	7.8/10
PopMatters	8/10 stars
The Quietus	4/5 stars
Tom Hull – on the Web	B+
The Wire	4/5 stars

The Common Task was well-received by contemporary music critics. On review aggregator website, Metacritic, The Common Task has an average rating of 83 out of 100 based on six critic reviews indicating "universal acclaim".

Matthew Ismael Ruiz, writing for Pitchfork gave the album a 7.8 out of 10. In describing The Common Task, Ruiz said "often the most pleasurable way to listen to a record like Horse Lords’ fourth LP, The Common Task, is to surrender, to shed those expectations and follow the music where it takes you. If it sounds similar to the way the human brain responds to certain psychedelics, it's no accident—the band's perspective was shaped in no small part by formative experiences with psychotropic drugs. The record's tension is rooted in anticipation, the only relief the relinquishing of control".

Dusted Magazine writing, Ian Forsynthe, gave the album four stars out of five, praising the fluidity and composition of the record. Forsynthe said that "their nearly ten-year core pivots rhythmic and tonal ideas athletically, and their ability to pull elements from anywhere and everywhere is seemingly more fluid with each record. With The Common Task, Horse Lords simultaneously stay within their own signature pocket and poach outside elements, expanding how large that pocket seems."

Paul Simpson of AllMusic praised the band's expansive sound on The Common Task, comparing the sound to krautrock and Saharan desert blues. Simpson said that The Common Task "lay a complex, polyrhythmic form of music that incorporates just intonation, algorithmic composition, and microtonal harmonies. The Common Task is their fourth studio album, and it's easily their most vibrant, dazzling recorded effort to date".

== Track listing ==
All music is composed by Andrew Bernstein, Max Eilbacher, Owen Gardner, and Sam Haberman.

No.	Title	Length
1.	"Fanfare for Effective Freedom"	7:22
2.	"Against Gravity"	7:49
3.	"The Radiant City"	3:04
4.	"People's Park"	4:20
5.	"Integral Accident"	18:38
Total length:		41:13
