= Acrosticta mexicana =

Scientific classification
- Kingdom: Animalia
- Phylum: Arthropoda
- Class: Insecta
- Order: Diptera
- Family: Ulidiidae
- Genus: Acrosticta
- Species: A. mexicana

Binomial name
- Acrosticta mexicana Cole, 1923

Species of fly

Acrosticta mexicana is a species of ulidiidae or picture-winged fly in the genus Acrosticta of the family Ulidiidae.
