= Acrosticta fiebrigi =

Scientific classification
- Kingdom: Animalia
- Phylum: Arthropoda
- Class: Insecta
- Order: Diptera
- Family: Ulidiidae
- Genus: Acrosticta
- Species: A. fiebrigi

Binomial name
- Acrosticta fiebrigi (Lindner, 1928)

Species of fly

Acrosticta fiebrigi is a species of ulidiid or picture-winged fly in the genus Acrosticta of the family Ulidiidae.
