= Kultrum =

Studio album by Dino Saluzzi
- Released: 1983
- Recorded: November 1982
- Studio: Tonstudio Bauer; Ludwigsburg, West Germany
- Genre: Jazz
- Length: 51:18
- Label: ECM 1251
- Producer: Manfred Eicher

Dino Saluzzi chronology
Kultrum (1983)	Once Upon a Time - Far Away in the South (1985)

Kultrum is a solo album by Argentine bandoneonista Dino Saluzzi recorded in November 1982 and released on ECM the following year.

== Reception ==
The AllMusic review awarded by Michael G. Nastos the album 3½ stars stating:

Dino Saluzzi as a solo performer is one of the more remarkable musicians in contemporary music, in that he plays several instruments, including his beloved bandoneon with such precision, balance and subtle power. Kultrum is indeed a multi-cultural project that taps into the folkloric, ancestral, and traditional sounds of Native American Indians and his South American roots, enhanced by producer Manfred Eicher's Eurocentric notions. The blending of deep drums, rattling percussion, and chanted vocals with the bandoneon or wood flutes creates a vista of deeply spiritual and ancient ritualistic music. Somehow these sounds are magically transmuted and modernized by the pristine sonic tones the ECM production team always lends to their albums, making this a true contemporary world music tour de force.

Professional ratings
Review scores
Source	Rating
Allmusic	3.5/5 stars

== Track listing ==
All compositions by Dino Saluzzi

1. "Kultrum pampa" - 9:26
2. "Gabriel Kondor" - 5:15
3. "Agua de paz" - 8:28
4. "Pajaros y ceibos" - 3:11
5. "Ritmo arauca" - 6:43
6. "El rio y el abuelo" - 7:02
7. "Pasos que quedan" - 4:14
8. "Por el sol y por la lluvia" - 6:50

== Personnel ==
- Dino Saluzzi – bandoneón, voice, percussion, flutes
