= Ommata buddemeyerae =

Scientific classification
- Kingdom: Animalia
- Phylum: Arthropoda
- Class: Insecta
- Order: Coleoptera
- Suborder: Polyphaga
- Infraorder: Cucujiformia
- Family: Cerambycidae
- Genus: Ommata
- Species: O. buddemeyerae

Binomial name
- Ommata buddemeyerae Clarke, 2010

Species of beetle

Ommata buddemeyerae is a species of beetle in the family Cerambycidae. It was described by Robin O.S. Clarke in 2010. It is known from Santa Cruz and Cochabamba Departments in Bolivia.

Ommata buddemeyerae measure 5.8–7.9 mm (0.23–0.31 in).
