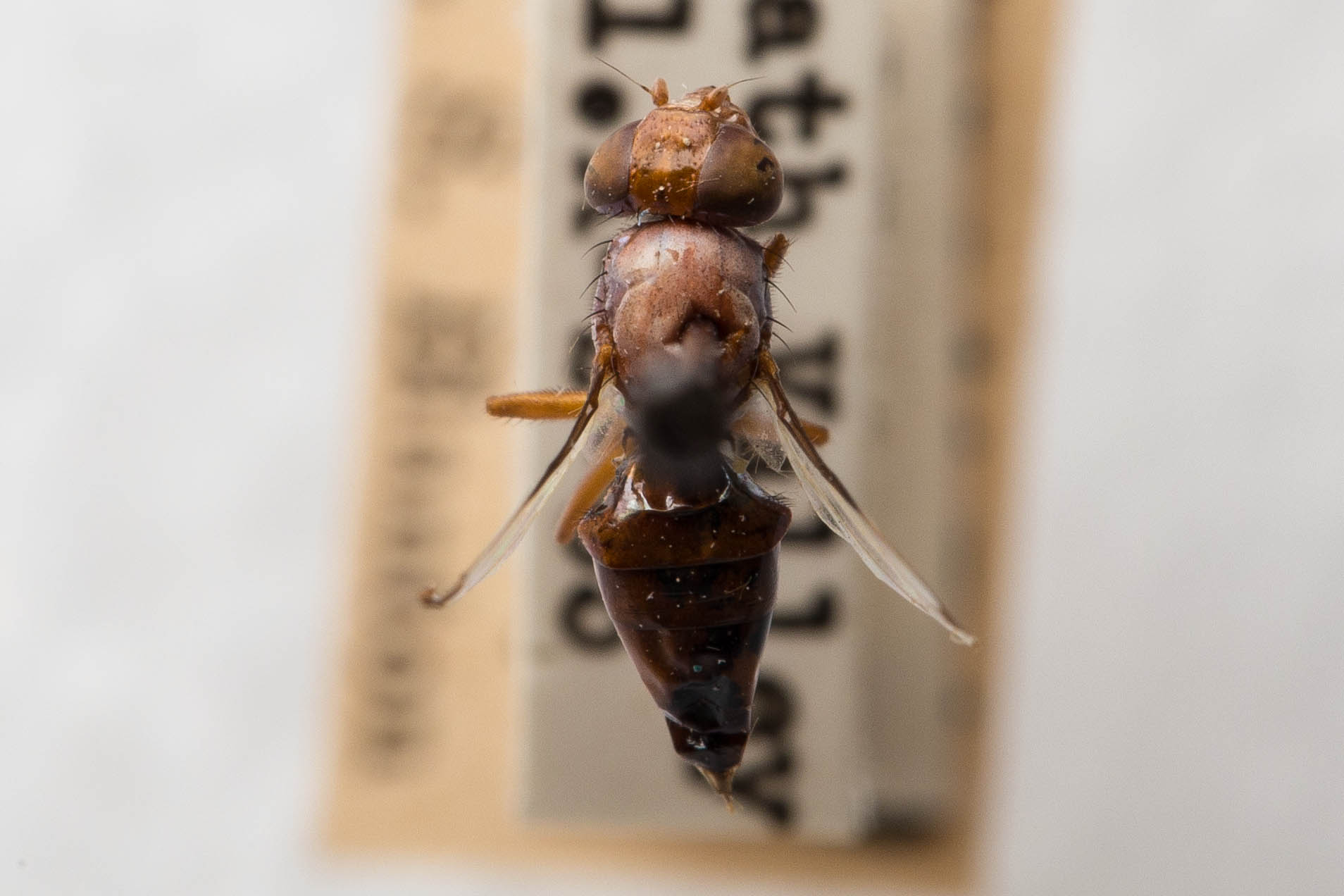

Scientific classification
- Kingdom: Animalia
- Phylum: Arthropoda
- Class: Insecta
- Order: Diptera
- Family: Ulidiidae
- Genus: Acrosticta
- Species: A. compta

Binomial name
- Acrosticta compta (Cole 1912)

= Acrosticta compta =

Species of fly

Acrosticta compta is a species of ulidiid or picture-winged fly in the genus Acrosticta of the family Ulidiidae.
