= Comradely Objects =

Studio album by Horse Lords
- Released: November 4, 2022
- Length: 41:25
- Label: RVNG Intl.

Horse Lords chronology
The Common Task (2020)	Comradely Objects (2022)	Demand to Be Taken to Heaven Alive! (2026)

Comradely Objects is a studio album by American experimental rock band Horse Lords. It was released on November 4, 2022, through RVNG Intl. It received universal acclaim from critics.

== Background ==
Horse Lords is an American experimental rock band from Baltimore. It consists of Andrew Bernstein, Max Eilbacher, Owen Gardner, and Sam Haberman. Comradely Objects is the band's first album since The Common Task (2020). The album's title comes from Christina Kiaer's book, Imagine No Possessions.

Comradely Objects was released on November 4, 2022, through RVNG Intl. Music videos were released for the tracks "Mess Mend", "May Brigade", and "Zero Degree Machine".

== Critical reception ==
Professional ratings
Aggregate scores
Source	Rating
Metacritic	83/100
Review scores
Source	Rating
AllMusic	4/5 stars
The Line of Best Fit	8/10
Mojo	4/5 stars
Pitchfork	7.8/10
Uncut	8/10

According to the review aggregator Metacritic, Comradely Objects received "universal acclaim" based on a weighted average score of 83 out of 100 from 8 critic scores.

Janne Oinonen of The Line of Best Fit stated, "Comradely Objects sounds less like the work of four individuals jostling for their turn in the spotlight than one finely engineered, utilitarian rhythm and riff machine chugging along with unstoppable momentum towards its goal of a joyful collective trance." Paul Simpson of AllMusic wrote, "Comradely Objects seems like some of the most complex, demanding music Horse Lords have made, yet, amazingly, it's also their most danceable album."

=== Accolades ===
Year-end lists for Comradely Objects
Publication	List	Rank	Ref.
NPR Music	The 11 Best Experimental Albums of 2022	—	
The Quietus	Quietus Albums of the Year 2022	16	
The Wire	Releases of the Year (2022 Rewind)	16	

== Track listing ==
Comradely Objects track listing
No.	Title	Length
1.	"Zero Degree Machine"	6:59
2.	"Mess Mend"	4:18
3.	"May Brigade"	6:34
4.	"Solidarity Avenue"	1:39
5.	"Law of Movement"	10:20
6.	"Rundling"	3:16
7.	"Plain Hunt on Four"	8:19
Total length:		41:25

== Personnel ==
Credits adapted from liner notes.

Horse Lords

- Andrew Bernstein – saxophone, percussion, electronics, mixing
- Max Eilbacher – bass guitar, electronics, mixing
- Owen Gardner – guitar, electronics, mixing
- Sam Haberman – drums, mixing

Additional personnel

- Andrew Christopher Smith – electric piano (on "Plain Hunt on Four")
- Jared Paolini – engineering
- Heba Kadry – mastering
- Josh Bonati – lacquer cut
- Will Work for Good – design
