= Acrosticta wytsmani =

Scientific classification
- Kingdom: Animalia
- Phylum: Arthropoda
- Class: Insecta
- Order: Diptera
- Family: Ulidiidae
- Genus: Acrosticta
- Species: A. wytsmani

Binomial name
- Acrosticta wytsmani Hendel 1910

Species of fly

Acrosticta wytsmani is a species of ulidiidae, or picture-winged fly, in the genus Acrosticta of the family Ulidiidae.
