= Juan Condori =

Studio album by the Dino Saluzzi Group
- Released: 2006
- Recorded: October 2005
- Studio: Buenos Aires
- Genre: Jazz
- Length: 76:47
- Label: ECM; ECM 1978
- Producer: Manfred Eicher

Dino Saluzzi chronology
Senderos (2002)	Juan Condori (2006)	Ojos Negros (2006)

Juan Condori is an album by the Dino Saluzzi Group, recorded in October 2005 and released on ECM the following year.

== Reception ==
The AllMusic review awarded by Thom Jurek awarded the album 4 stars stating "Juan Condori is one of those recordings where jazz, folk music, and improvisation all wind themselves into the notion of a complex but utterly beguiling song."

The All About Jazz review by Budd Kopman states, "Juan Condori is one of the most heartfelt and deeply moving releases you will come across."

The JazzTimes review by Bill Milkowski states, "This warm-hearted family affair stands as one of Saluzzi’s best."

Professional ratings
Review scores
Source	Rating
AllMusic	4/5 stars

== Track listing ==
All compositions by Dino Saluzzi

1. "La vuelta de Pedro Orillas" - 8:44
2. "Milonga de mis amores" - 6:28
3. "Juan Condori" - 9:01
4. "Memoria" - 6:09
5. "La parecida" - 4:51
6. "Inside" - 3:55
7. "Soles/La camposanteña" - 7:22
8. "Las cosas amadas" - 6:07
9. "A Juana, mi madre" - 6:24
10. "Los sauces" - 7:08
11. "Improvisación" - 3:10
12. "Chiriguan" - 7:28

== Personnel ==
=== The Dino Saluzzi Group ===
- Dino Saluzzi – bandoneón
- Felix "Cuchara" Saluzzi – tenor saxophone, soprano saxophone, clarinet
- José Maria Saluzzi – acoustic guitar, electric guitar
- Matias Saluzzi – double bass, bass guitar
- U. T. Gandhi – drums, percussion
