= Senderos (album) =

Studio album by Dino Saluzzi
- Released: 2005
- Recorded: November 2002
- Studio: Rainbow Studio; Oslo, Norway
- Genre: Jazz
- Length: 78:12
- Label: ECM; ECM 1845
- Producer: Manfred Eicher

Dino Saluzzi chronology
Responsorium (2001)	Senderos (2005)	Juan Condori (2005)

Senderos is an album by Argentine musician Dino Saluzzi with percussionist Jon Christensen recorded in November 2002 and released on ECM in 2005.

== Reception ==
Professional ratings
Review scores
Source	Rating
AllMusic	4.5/5 stars

The AllMusic review by Thom Jurek states, "there is no other recording like this. It is a watershed marking a brilliant artist's return to recording, and a step outside his comfort zone that offers proof of the restless and poignant direction of his muse and his ability to translate it directly, honestly, and with passion."

The All About Jazz review by John Kelman states, "Senderos is the kind of album that requires listeners to give up any notion of convention; it also expects them to permit themselves to be drawn into a world of delicate shadings and understatement. Senderos may be unconventional, but it is still approachable in its refined lyricism. One need only listen."

== Track listing ==
All tracks are written by Dino Saluzzi, except as noted.

No.	Title	Writer(s)	Length
1.	"Vientos"	Jon Christensen; Dino Saluzzi	7:19
2.	"Imagines..."		3:31
3.	"Todos los recuerdos"		4:51
4.	"Tus ojos...!"		6:17
5.	"Detras de las rejas...!"	Christensen; Saluzzi	4:52
6.	"Los ceibos de mi pueblo"		4:31
7.	"Aspectos"	Christensen; Saluzzi	4:36
8.	"Huellas"		5:26
9.	"Ternuras"		5:59
10.	"Allá!... en los montes dormidos"		5:17
11.	"Tiempos"		7:23
12.	"Fantasia"		6:08
13.	"Formas"	Christensen; Saluzzi	8:02
14.	"Eternidades – Loca Bohemia"	Francisco de Caro; Saluzzi	4:46

== Personnel ==
=== Musicians ===
- Dino Saluzzi – bandoneón
- Jon Christensen (except tracks 2, 10, 12, 14) – percussion

=== Technical personnel ===
- Manfred Eicher – producer
- Jan Erik Kongshaug – engineer
- Sascha Kleis – design
- Hitters – cover photography, liner photo (Saluzzi)
- Roberto Masotti – liner photo (Christensen)
