= Acrosticta andina =

Scientific classification
- Kingdom: Animalia
- Phylum: Arthropoda
- Clade: Pancrustacea
- Class: Insecta
- Order: Diptera
- Family: Ulidiidae
- Genus: Acrosticta
- Species: A. andina

Binomial name
- Acrosticta andina Brethes, 1922

Species of fly

Acrosticta andina is a species of ulidiid or picture-winged fly in the genus Acrosticta of the family Ulidiidae.
