= Wilketalia =

Scientific classification
- Kingdom: Fungi
- Division: Ascomycota
- Class: Lecanoromycetes
- Order: Teloschistales
- Family: Teloschistaceae
- Genus: Wilketalia; S.Y.Kondr. (2022)
- Species: W. citrinoides

Binomial name
- Wilketalia citrinoides (Wilk & Lücking) S.Y.Kondr. (2022)

Synonyms
- Andina Wilk, Pabijan & Lücking (2021); Andina citrinoides Wilk & Lücking (2021)

Single-species fungal genus

Wilketalia is a fungal genus in the family Teloschistaceae. It is monotypic, containing the single species Wilketalia citrinoides, a saxicolous (rock-dwelling) crustose lichen found in the Bolivian Andes.

== Taxonomy ==
The lichen was initially described as Andina citrinoides by Karina Wilk and Robert Lücking in 2021. The original naming of the genus Andina was based on molecular phylogenetic studies and the revision of South American representatives of Teloschistaceae. The genus Andina was later deemed illegitimate due to its homonymy with earlier established genera in the families Orchidaceae and Pottiaceae. In 2022, Sergey Kondratyuk proposed the new replacement name Wilketalia, in honour of Karina Wilk and her colleagues, for the species originally named Andina citrinoides.

== Description ==
Wilketalia citrinoides is characterized by its areolate (cracked) and sorediate (producing soredia for reproduction) thallus. The thallus has a striking yellow to yellow-orange colouration, reminiscent of Flavoplaca citrina, but is distinguishable by its smaller soredia, measuring 20–50 μm in diameter, and its initially circular soralia. Apothecia (fruiting bodies) have not been observed in this species.

The thallus of Wilketalia citrinoides is approximately 100 μm thick and presents an irregular outline. The areoles are scattered to continuous and range from 0.2 to 0.6 mm in width. These areoles can be flat to convex and have an entire or crenate (scalloped) margin. The surface of the areoles may show a slight white pruinosity (powdery appearance) and is smooth, often breaking down into soredia. The vegetative propagules, primarily the soredia, are abundant and spread in irregular patterns, initially laminal (on the surface) and erumpent (breaking through the cortex) soralia that are more or less round, measuring 0.15 to 0.2 mm in diameter.

The prothallus, or the area surrounding the areoles, is sometimes present but inconspicuous and shares the colour of the thallus. The cortex of the thallus is thin, ranging from 5 to 17 μm, and is made up of a paraplectenchymatous tissue (composed of irregularly arranged cells). There is no necral layer (dead cell layer), and anthraquinone pigments are present. The algal layer within the thallus is continuous, with the photobiont being trebouxioid (a type of green algae), with spherical cells 5–15 μm in diameter. Pycnidia (asexual reproductive structures) are few, with an ostiole (opening) that is orange and more or less immersed, though indistinct. The conidia (asexual spores) produced are ovoid, measuring 2–4 by 1–1.5 μm.

== Habitat and distribution ==
Wilketalia citrinoides typically occurs on rocky slopes, particularly in areas with sparse Polylepis forests. This lichen favours siliceous rock surfaces in humid environments. It grows at high altitudes, approximately around 3,700 m (12,100 ft). The known distribution of the lichen is confined to the Andes mountain range in Bolivia.
