= Jean-Louis Matinier =

Jean-Louis Matinier (born 1963 in Nevers, France) is a leading contemporary accordion player in the fields of jazz and world music.

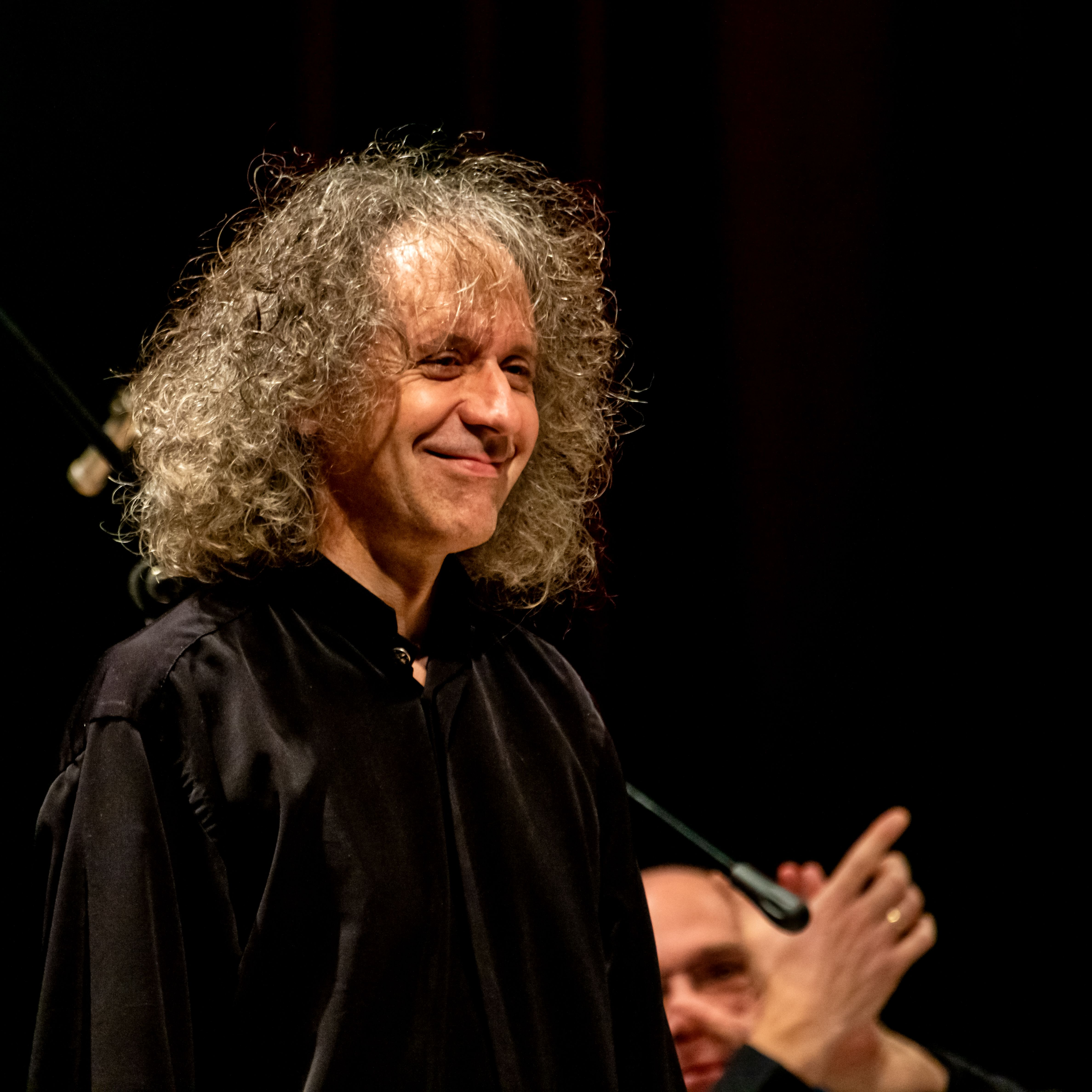
Matinier at the concert "Jeux Doubles" 15.12.2018 in Merzhausen Germany

== Life and work ==
Matinier studied classical music, then turned to jazz and other forms of improvised music. From 1989 to 1991 he played in the French National Jazz Orchestra. His way of playing is strongly influenced by the attitude of a European, chamber jazz, with its specific uptake of the accordion tradition affects the music but also relaxing. His compositions are imaginative and he turns his instrument versatile. Matinier occurs usually with other instrumentalists, such as with Renaud Garcia-Fons, who accompanied him in a very interactive duo on his bass. In Germany, he first became known through performances with Michael Riessler. Matinier has previously collaborated with Louis Sclavis, Gianluigi Trovesi, Michel Godard, François Couturier, Philippe Caillat, and Anouar Brahem.

== Selected discography ==
- Another World w/ Dave Friedman & Anthony Cox
- 2001: Fuera w/ Renaud Garcia-Fons
- 2004: Confluences w/ Renaud García- Fons, Bobby Rangell & Nelson Veras
- 2014: Inventio (ECM 2348) w/ Marco Ambrosini

With Anouar Brahem

- 2002: Le Pas du Chat Noir (ECM 1792) w/ François Couturier
- 2006: Le Voyage de Sahar (ECM 1915) w/ François Couturier

With François Couturier / Tarkovsky Quartet

- 2006: Nostalghia – A Song for Tarkovsky (ECM 1979)
- 2011: Tarkovsky Quartet (ECM 2159)
- 2017: Nuit blanche (ECM 2524)

With Louis Sclavis

- 2000: Dans la Nuit (ECM 1805)
