= Thimar =

Studio album by Anouar Brahem
- Released: 1998
- Recorded: March 13–15, 1997
- Studio: Rainbow Studio; Oslo, Norway
- Genre: Jazz
- Length: 54:32
- Label: ECM; ECM 1641
- Producer: Manfred Eicher

Anouar Brahem chronology
Khomsa (1994)	Thimar (1998)	Astrakan Café (1999)

Thimar is an album by Tunisian oud player Anouar Brahem, recorded over three days in March 1997 and released on ECM the following year. The trio features reed player John Surman and bassist Dave Holland.

== Reception ==
Professional ratings
Review scores
Source	Rating
AllMusic	4/5 stars
The Austin Chronicle	4/5 stars

The AllMusic review by Raymond McKinney stated that it "superbly fuses the traditions of jazz with those of Arab classical music, pushing the parameters of both while succumbing to the clichés of neither."

== Track listing ==
All music is composed by Anouar Brahem, except as noted.

No.	Title	Writer(s)	Length
1.	"Badhra"		8:30
2.	"Kashf"		5:23
3.	"Houdouth"		5:36
4.	"Talwin"		4:18
5.	"Waqt"		2:32
6.	"Uns"		4:48
7.	"Al Hizam Al Dhahbi"		5:40
8.	"Qurb"		5:16
9.	"Mazad"	Dave Holland	5:05
10.	"Kernow"	John Surman	5:10
11.	"Hulmu Rabia"		2:14
Total length:			54:32

== Personnel ==
- Anouar Brahem – oud
- John Surman – soprano saxophone, bass clarinet
- Dave Holland – double bass
