= Stigmella andina =

Scientific classification
- Kingdom: Animalia
- Phylum: Arthropoda
- Clade: Pancrustacea
- Class: Insecta
- Order: Lepidoptera
- Family: Nepticulidae
- Genus: Stigmella
- Species: S. andina

Binomial name
- Stigmella andina (Meyrick, 1915)

Species of moth

Stigmella andina is a moth of the family Nepticulidae and is endemic to Peru.
