= Dino Saluzzi =

Argentine jazz bandoneonist

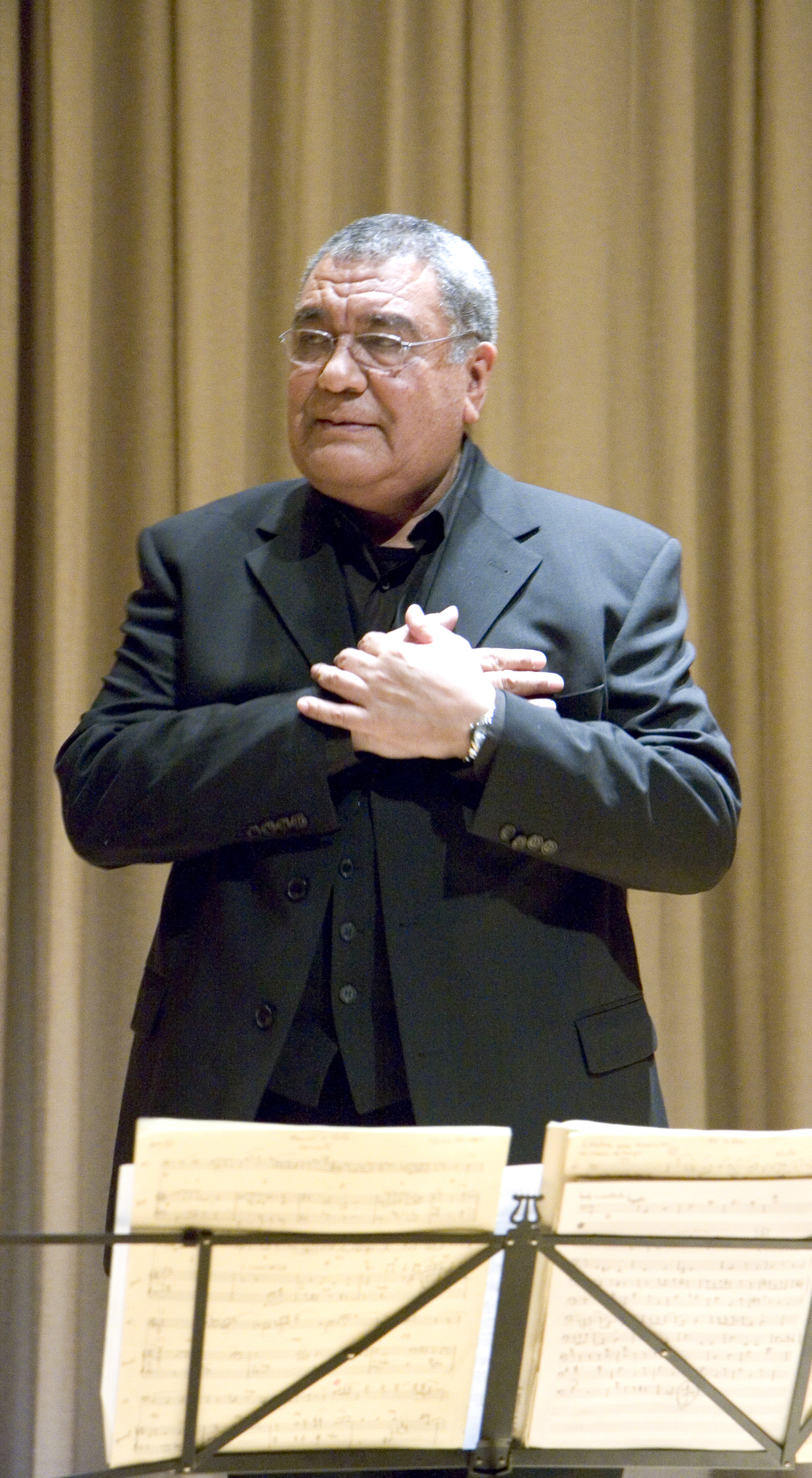

Background information
- Born: Timoteo Saluzzi; 20 May 1935 (age 91); Campo Santo, Salta Province, Argentina
- Genres: Jazz, avant-garde jazz, Latin music
- Occupations: Musician, composer, bandleader
- Instrument: Bandoneon
- Years active: 1970s–present
- Label: ECM
- Website: saluzzimusic.com.ar

Timoteo "Dino" Saluzzi (born 20 May 1935) is an Argentine bandoneon player. He is the son of Cayetano Saluzzi and the father of guitarist José Maria Saluzzi.

== Early life, family and education ==
Timoteo "Dino" Saluzzi was born in Campo Santo, Salta Province, Argentina. Saluzzi has been playing the bandoneon since his childhood. As a youth in Buenos Aires, Dino played with the Radio El Mundo orchestra. His father was Cayetano Saluzzi.

== Career ==
Saluzzi landed a contract with the ECM label. Several records have resulted, including Kultrum, 1983. From the beginning of the 1980s onwards, there were collaborations with European and American jazz musicians including Charlie Haden, Tomasz Stańko, Charlie Mariano, Palle Danielsson, and Al Di Meola.

ECM brought Saluzzi together with Charlie Haden, Palle Mikkelborg and Pierre Favre for Once upon a Time – Far Away in the South. Rava had worked extensively in Argentina, and Haden's sympathy for Latin American music was well known; furthermore Palle Mikkelborg and Dino Saluzzi had worked together productively in George Gruntz's band.

== Discography ==
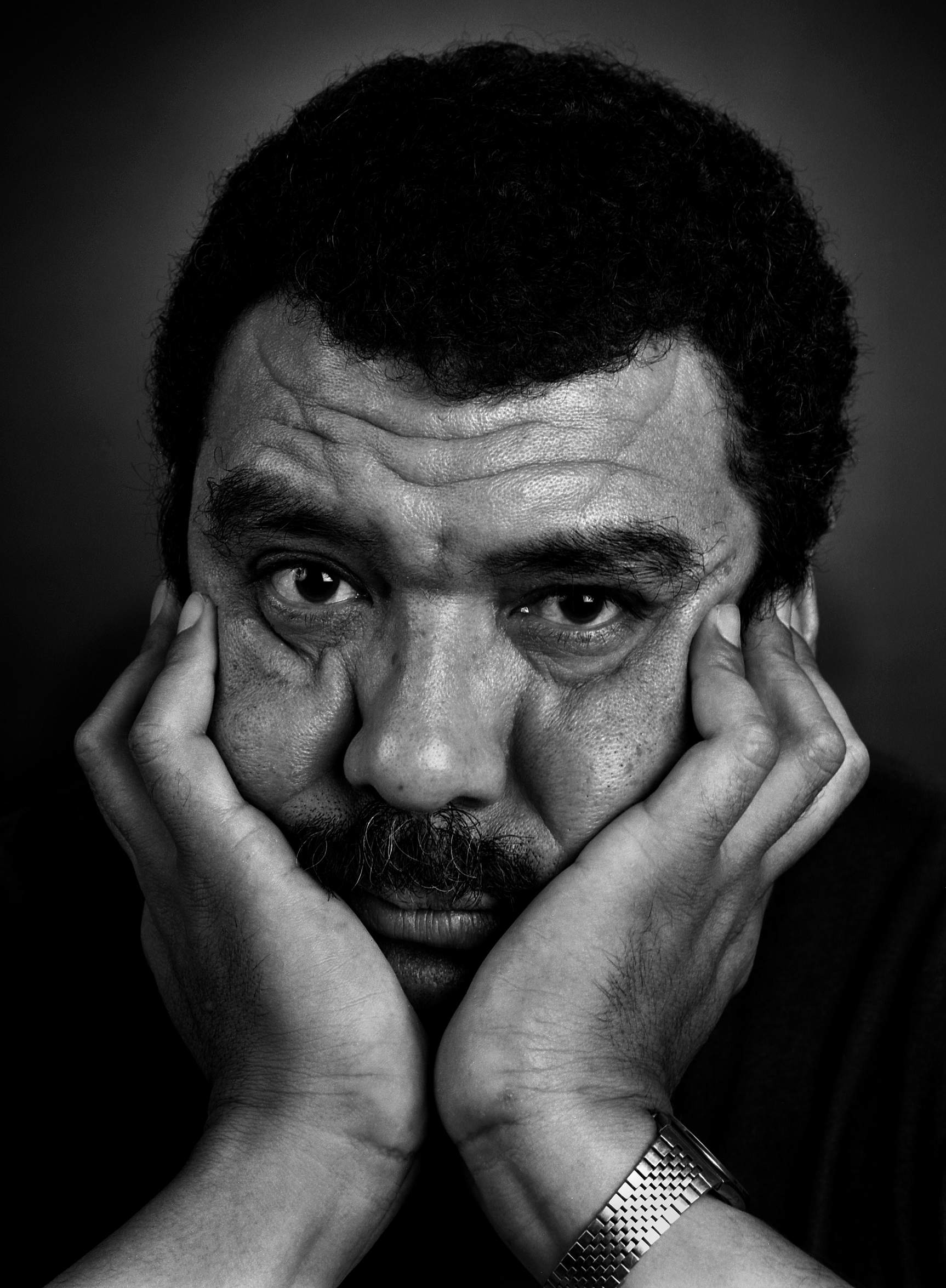
Dino Saluzzi by Gert Chesi

=== As leader ===
- 1972: De Vuelta a Salta (RCA Camden)
- 1973: Bandoneón Tierra Adentro – Vol. 1 (RCA Camden)
- 1975: Bandoneón Tierra Adentro – Vol. 2 (RCA Victor)
- 1977: Dedicatoria (Melopea)
- 1980: Bermejo (Microfón)
- 1982: Kultrum (ECM)
- 1985: Once Upon a Time – Far Away in the South (ECM)
- 1986: Volver with Enrico Rava (ECM)
- 1988: Andina (ECM)
- 1991: Argentina (West Wind Latina)
- 1996: Cité de la Musique (ECM)
- 1998: Kultrum with the Rosamunde Quartett (ECM)
- 2001: Responsorium (ECM)
- 2002: Senderos (ECM)
- 2006: Ojos Negros (ECM), with Anja Lechner
- 2009: El Encuentro (ECM)
- 2011: Navidad de Los Andes (ECM), with trio including Anja Lechner and Felix Saluzzi
- 2020: Albores (ECM)
- 2025: El Viejo Caminante (ECM)

==== Los Chalchaleros con el bandoneón de Dino Saluzzi ====
- 1972: La Cerrillana (RCA Victor)

==== Dino Saluzzi Group ====
- 1991: Mojotoro (ECM)
- 2005: Juan Condori (ECM)
- 2014: El Valle de la Infancia (ECM)

==== Trio with Anthony Cox and David Friedman ====
- 1995: Rios (veraBra)

==== Trio with George Gruntz and Thierry Lang ====
- 2005: Trio Tage (PJL)

=== As sideman ===
With Pedro Orillas

- 1970: Soy Buenos Aires (RCA Camden)

With Litto Nebbia

- 1981: Tres Noches en la Trastienda (Melopea), trio including Bernardo Baraj

With George Gruntz

- 1983: Theatre (ECM)

With Al Di Meola

- 1990: World Sinfonia (Tomato)
- 1993: World Sinfonia II – Heart of the Immigrants (Telarc)
- 1996: Di Meola Plays Piazzolla (Atlantic)

With Rickie Lee Jones

- 1991: Pop Pop (Warner Bros.)

With Maria João

- 1996: Fábula

With Tomasz Stańko

- 1998: From the Green Hill (ECM)

With Giya Kancheli, Gidon Kremer and Andrei Pushkarev

- 2010: Themes from the Songbook (ECM)
