= Volver (Enrico Rava and Dino Saluzzi album) =

Studio album by the Enrico Rava/Dino Saluzzi Quintet
- Released: 1988
- Recorded: October 1986
- Studio: Tonstudio Bauer; Ludwigsburg, W. Germany
- Genre: Jazz
- Length: 46:55
- Label: ECM 1343
- Producer: Manfred Eicher

Enrico Rava chronology
Secrets (1986)	Volver (1988)	Animals (1987)

Dino Saluzzi chronology
Once upon a Time – Far Away in the South (1985)	Volver (1986)	Andina (1988)

Volver is an album by the Enrico Rava/Dino Saluzzi Quintet recorded in October 1986 and released on ECM in 1988. The quintet features rhythm section Harry Pepl, Furio Di Castri and Bruce Ditmas.

== Reception ==
The AllMusic review by Scott Yanow awarded the album 3 stars stating "Rava's introverted yet inwardly passionate playing matches well with Saluzzi's modern tangos, and the results are fairly accessible yet still exploratory. An intriguing set."

Professional ratings
Review scores
Source	Rating
Allmusic	3/5 stars

== Track listing ==
All compositions by Enrico Rava except as indicated

1. "Le but du souffle" – 6:30
2. "Minguito" (Dino Saluzzi) – 11:21
3. "Luna-volver" (Carlos Gardel) – 6:34
4. "Tiempos de ausencias" (Saluzzi) – 8:00
5. "Ballantine for Valentine" (Harry Pepl) – 4:52
6. "Visions" – 10:05

== Personnel ==
=== Enrico Rava / Dino Saluzzi Quintet ===
- Enrico Rava – trumpet
- Dino Saluzzi – bandoneón
- Harry Pepl – guitar
- Furio Di Castri – bass
- Bruce Ditmas – drums
