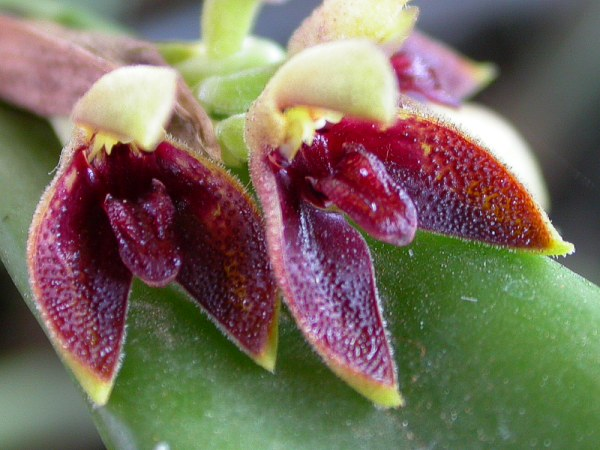

Scientific classification
- Kingdom: Plantae
- Clade: Tracheophytes
- Clade: Angiosperms
- Clade: Monocots
- Order: Asparagales
- Family: Orchidaceae
- Subfamily: Epidendroideae
- Genus: Acianthera
- Species: A. aphthosa

Binomial name
- Acianthera aphthosa (Lindl.) Pridgeon & M.W.Chase (2001)

Synonyms
- Pleurothallis aphthosa Lindl. (1838) (Basionym); Pleurothallis foetens Lindl. (1843); Pleurothallis macrophyta Barb.Rodr. (1877); Pleurothallis pelioxantha Barb.Rodr. (1877); Humboldtia foetens (Lindl.) Kuntze (1891); Pleurothallis ciliata var. abbreviata C. Schweinf. (1953); Specklinia aphthosa (Lindl.) F. Barros (1983)

= Acianthera aphthosa =

Species of orchid

Acianthera aphthosa is a species of orchid. It was first described by John Lindley in 1838 as Pleurothallis aphthosa, but was assigned to the genus, Acianthera, in 2001 by Pridgeon and Mark W. Chase. It is native to Bolivia, Brazil, Colombia, Ecuador, Paraguay, and Peru.
