= François Couturier =

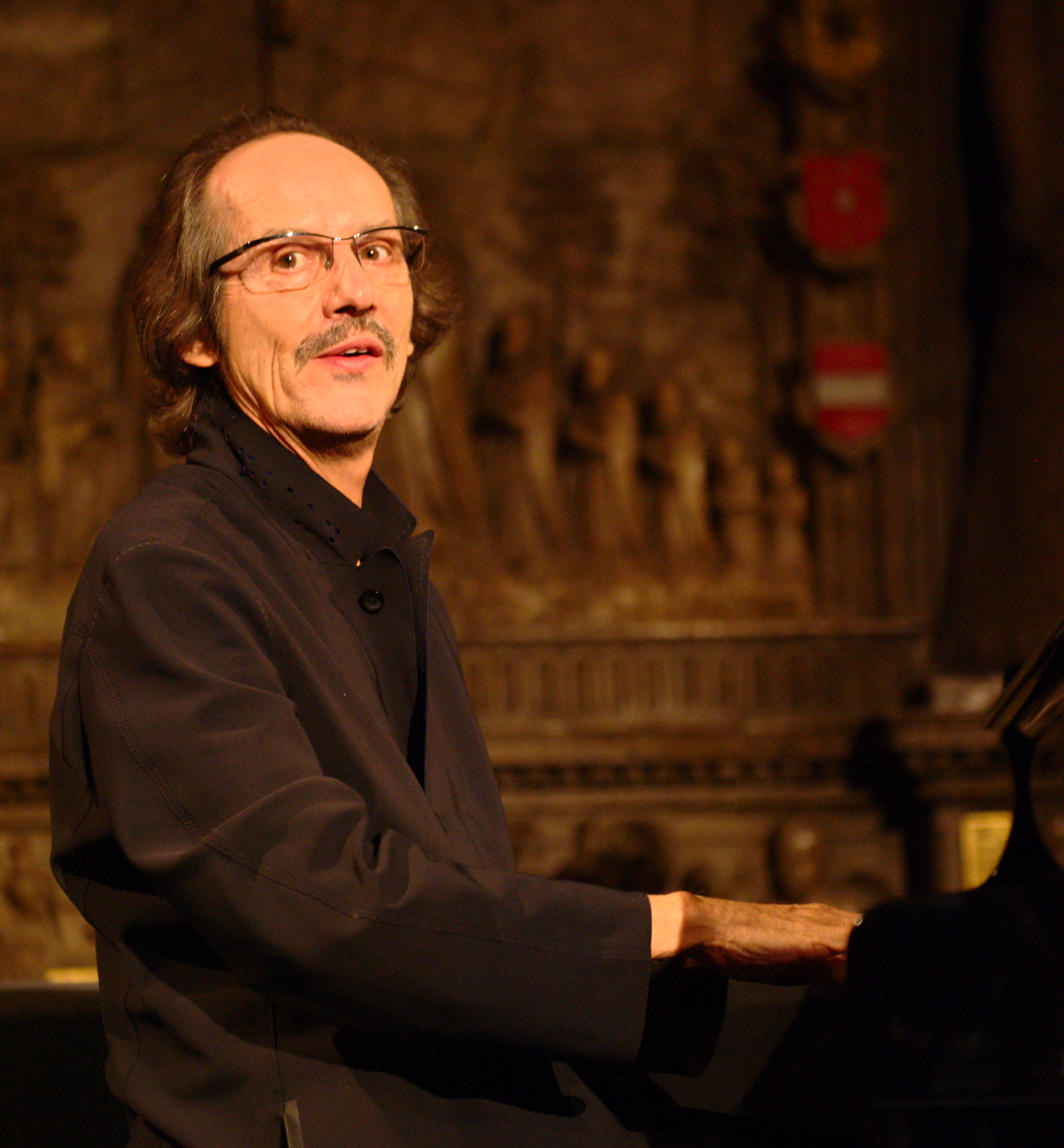
Couturier at his concert with Anja Lechner in the Stadtkirche Darmstadt on October 11, 2015

François Couturier (born 2 May 1950 in Fleury-les-Aubrais, Orléans) is a French jazz pianist.

== Biography ==
Couturier began learning piano at the age of six. A year after earning his degree in classical piano and musicology in 1977, he met Jacques Thollot's quartet bassist Jean-Paul Céléa, with whom he formed a duo. Between 1981 and 1983, Couturier toured with John McLaughlin, with whom he also recorded. Over time, he played with French jazz musicians such as André Ceccarelli, Eddy Louiss, Michel Portal, François Jeanneau and with Daniel Humair. After first meeting during the 1985 edition of the Festival de Carthage, Couturier collaborated on Tunisian oud player Anouar Brahem's albums Khomsa (1994), Le pas du Chat Noir (2001) and Le Voyage de Sahar (2005), and the two have toured together several times since 2001.

In 2006, his album Nostalghia – A Song for Tarkovsky was released on the label ECM Records alongside soprano saxophonist Jean-Marc Larché, accordionist Jean-Louis Matinier and cellist Anja Lechner. The album is dedicated to the film director Andrei Tarkovsky and his films. The album's music was also presented at various festivals, first in Bergamo in 2006. Other albums with the "Tarkovsky Quartet" followed in 2011 and 2017. In 2007, he played in the quintet "Passaggio", with which he recorded two albums on Label Bleu, and in the "European Jazz Trio" with Céléa and Wolfgang Reisinger. He also plays in duo with the violinist Dominique Pifarély on his album Poros (1997) and with the pianist Jean-Pierre Chalet. With the countertenor Dominique Visse he recorded From Machaut to Berio.

== Discography ==
- 2014: With the cellist Anja Lechner Moderato cantabile, ECM New Series 2367, 2014.

== Honors ==
- 1981: Prix Django Reinhardt
