= Andina (album) =

Studio album by Dino Saluzzi
- Released: 1988
- Recorded: May 1988
- Studio: Rainbow Studio; Oslo, Norway
- Genre: Jazz
- Length: 42:59
- Label: ECM; ECM 1375
- Producer: Manfred Eicher

Dino Saluzzi chronology
Volver (1986)	Andina (1988)	Mojotoro (1991)

Andina is a solo album by Argentine bandoneón player Dino Saluzzi recorded in May 1988 and released on ECM later that year.

== Reception ==
The AllMusic review awarded the album 3 stars.

Professional ratings
Review scores
Source	Rating
AllMusic	3/5 stars
Hi-Fi News & Record Review	A*:1

== Track listing ==
All compositions by Dino Saluzzi

1. "Dance (In the Morning)" - 8:11
2. "Winter" - 5:57
3. "Transmutation (Romanza and Toccata)" - 5:11
4. "Remoteness... And the Years Went By" - 2:55
5. "Tango of Obligation: Introduction/Dance/The End" - 5:03
6. "Choral (The Man of the Mirsacles)" - 4:16
7. "Waltz for Verna" - 2:46
8. "Andina: Toccata (My Father)/Huaino (...My Small Town)/The End (...And the Days Arrived)" - 7:29
9. "Memories" - 1:22

== Personnel ==
- Dino Saluzzi – bandoneón, flute
