= Andina mine =

Copper mine in Chile

Andina
- Interactive map of Andina

Location
- Location: Valparaíso Region, Chile; 33°07′32.04″S 70°15′27.12″W

Production
- Products: Copper
- Production: 177,000 tonnes fine copper
- Financial year: 2022

History
- Opened: 1970

Owner
- Company: Codelco

Andina or División Andina is a copper mine in the Andes of Central Chile located in Valparaíso Region. The mine is located in mountanious terrain at altitudes of 3,700 to 4,200 m a.s.l. and is adjacent to Los Bronces mine at the border of the regions of Valparaíso and Santiago. It is both an open-pit and underground mine. The mine begun operations in 1970. In 2022 it was estimated by Codelco that Andina had reserves of 36.8 million tons copper and Los Bronces 12.7 million tons copper. By the same estimation the joint reserves of both mines had an average ore grade of 0.78% copper. Andina mine export ore concentrates of c. 28% copper at the port of Ventanas. The concentrates produced in Andina contain about 40% chalcopyrite, 20% chalcocite, 20% pyrite and 8% pyrrhotite. (Note: When dry and as weight percent.)

In 1971 Andina was the last active mine to be nationalized during the Allende government's nationalization of copper.

Andina is owned by Codelco and Los Bronces is owned by Anglo American Sur, a joint venture where Codelco has an indirect stake of 20%.

In February 2025 an agreement was signed between Codelco and Anglo American to integrate the operations of both mines. As part of the agreement a joint mining plan is scheduled to run from 2030 to 2051 which is expected to lead to an additional annual production during that period of 120,000 tons copper shared between both mines. (Note: This increase represents 2.8% of the total Chilean copper production as of 2023.)
