= Anja Lechner =

German cellist (born 1961)

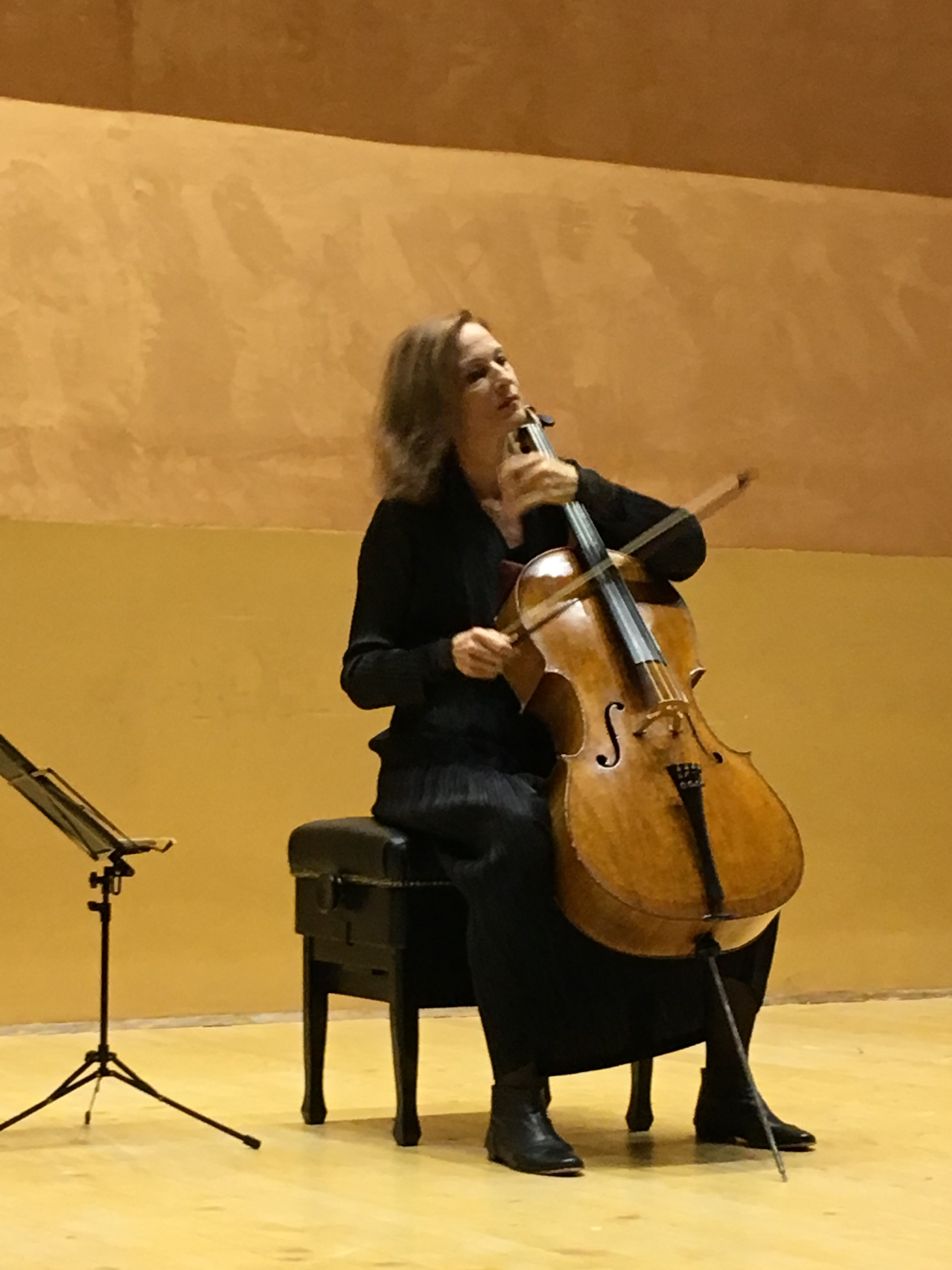
Anja Lechner in concert at the Bulgaria hall, Sofia on 15 January 2018

Anja Lechner (born 1961 in Kassel) is a German violoncellist equally active in classical music and jazz.

== Biography ==
Anja Lechner grew up in Neubeuern on the Inn River. She studied under Heinrich Schiff and János Starker in Bloomington on a scholarship from the Studienstiftung des deutschen Volkes (German Academic Scholarship Foundation). In 1980, she won First Prize at the national competition for music academies and conservatories, as well as First Prize from the German Phono Academy. In 1990, she received the Advancement Award of the City of Munich. In 1992, the ARD produced a television portrait of her. Anja Lechner is a founding member of the Rosamunde Quartet, of which she was a member from 1992 until its dissolution in 2009. With the quartet, she recorded works by, among others, Joseph Haydn, Dmitri Shostakovich, and Tigran Mansurian. Their recordings released by ECM received numerous international reviews and many awards.

The recording leggiero, pesante, featuring music by Valentin Silvestrov, was nominated for a Grammy in 2003. Since the early 1990s, she has collaborated with Argentine bandoneon player Dino Saluzzi in a wide variety of ensembles. Their duo album Ojos Negros was released in 2007 and presented during a highly acclaimed US tour in early 2007. The magazine DownBeat named it the best CD of the year in 2007. The film El Encuentro (directed by Norbert Wiedmer and Enrique Roos), about the duo Anja Lechner & Dino Saluzzi, received an award from the German Record Critics’ Award (Preis der Deutschen Schallplattenkritik) in 2013. Since 2006, Anja Lechner has performed with the Tarkovsky Quartet, alongside pianist and composer François Couturier, saxophonist Jean-Marc Larché, and accordionist Jean-Louis Matinier. By 2017, the quartet had released three albums.

Since 2012, Anja Lechner and François Couturier have also performed as a duo. Joachim Kronsbein described their 2014 album Moderato Cantabile in the news magazine Der Spiegel as “one of the most unusual albums of the year.” She has undertaken further projects with Patricia Kopatchinskaja, the Amsterdam Sinfonietta, the Tallinn Chamber Orchestra, Reto Bieri, Alexei Lyubimov, Anna Gourari, and Silke Avenhaus. In the field of improvisation, she has collaborated with Vassilis Tsabropoulos, Maria Pia De Vito, Michele Rabbia, Misha Alperin, Arkady Shilkloper, Peter Ludwig, Sylvie Courvoisier, and Mark Feldman. She has premiered numerous works, some of which were dedicated to her. These include compositions by Valentin Silvestrov, Tigran Mansurian, Arvo Pärt, Dino Saluzzi, Tõnu Kõrvits, Zad Moultaka, and Günter Bialas. From 1993 to 1998, she held a visiting professorship at the University of Music and Performing Arts Graz.

Anja Lechner lives and teaches in Munich.

== Discography (selection) ==
- Kultrum, Dino Saluzzi & Rosamunde Quartett, ECM 1998
- Valentin Silvestrov: leggiero, pesante, ECM 2002
- Chants, Hymns and Dances, mit Vassilis Tsabropoulos, mit Musik von G.I. Gurdjieff, ECM 2004
- Nostalghia - Song For Tarkovsky, Tarkovsky Quartet, ECM 2006
- Ojos Negros, mit Dino Saluzzi, ECM 2007
- Navidad de los Andes, mit Dino & Felix Saluzzi, ECM 2011
- Il Pergolese, mit Maria Pia De Vito, ECM 2013
- Tigran Mansurian: Quasi parlando, mit Patricia Kopatchinskaja, Amsterdam Sinfonietta, Candida Thompson, ECM 2014
- François Couturier/Anja Lechner Moderato Cantabile, ECM New Series 2367, 2014
- Tõnu Kõrvits: Mirror, mit Tallinn Chamber Orchestra & Tõnu Kaljuste, ECM 2016
- Valentin Silvestrov: Hieroglyphen der Nacht, mit Agnès Vesterman, ECM 2017
- Franz Schubert: Die Nacht, mit Pablo Márquez, ECM 2018
- Anja Lechner, François Couturier: Lontano, ECM 2020
- Bach – Abel – Hume, ECM 2024
