= Demand to Be Taken to Heaven Alive! =

Studio album by Horse Lords
- Released: June 12, 2026
- Recorded: Berlin and Baltimore
- Genre: Experimental rock
- Length: 40:45
- Label: RVNG Intl.

Horse Lords chronology
FRKWYS Vol. 18: Extended Field (2025)	Demand to Be Taken to Heaven Alive! (2026)

Singles from Demand to Be Taken to Heaven Alive!
- 1. "Eureka 378-B" Released: March 17, 2026; 2. "Brain of the Firm" Released: March 17, 2026; 3. "First Galactic Utopia" Released: April 28, 2026

Demand to Be Taken to Heaven Alive! is the sixth full-length studio album by the American experimental rock band Horse Lords. It was released on June 12, 2026, through RVNG Intl.. Recorded between Berlin and Baltimore, it is the band's first album to feature vocals and expands its core guitar, bass, drums, and saxophone lineup with contributions from vocalists Nina Guo and Evelyn Saylor, bass clarinetist Madison Greenstone, and trombonist Weston Olencki.

The album was announced with the singles "Eureka 378-B" and "Brain of the Firm", followed by "First Galactic Utopia" and a video for the title track. It received generally favorable reviews from critics, with a score of 79 out of 100 on Metacritic, and was selected as Album of the Week by The Quietus and Treble.

== Background and recording ==
Demand to Be Taken to Heaven Alive! followed Horse Lords' 2022 album Comradely Objects and their 2025 collaborative album FRKWYS Vol. 18: Extended Field with Arnold Dreyblatt. Matthew Blackwell of Bandcamp Daily wrote that it was the first Horse Lords album made remotely, after most of the group moved to Berlin while drummer Sam Haberman remained in Baltimore. Chris Ingalls of PopMatters similarly described the album as having been created semi-remotely, with Owen Gardner, Max Eilbacher, and Andrew Bernstein based in Berlin and Haberman assembling his drum parts in Baltimore.

RVNG wrote that the members' separation shaped the working process, with Gardner, Eilbacher, and Bernstein meeting for tracking sessions in Berlin while Haberman recorded drum parts in Baltimore. The official credits list Adam Asnan as the recording engineer in Berlin and Jared Paolini as the recording engineer in Baltimore.

== Composition ==
Critics described Demand to Be Taken to Heaven Alive! as retaining Horse Lords' rhythmically complex approach while adding vocals, winds, and brass. The album opens with "Eureka 378-B", an arrangement of nineteenth-century Sacred Harp music sung by Guo and Saylor. Bandcamp credits identify its music as John P. Rees's 1859 tune from The Sacred Harp, Cooper edition, with lyrics by Thomas Kelly from The Primitive Hymns, Spiritual Songs, and Sacred Poems. Critics noted that fragments of the singers' voices recur elsewhere on the album, especially in "Brain of the Firm" and the three "Rotation" interludes.

RVNG's album notes state that a transformation algorithm was used in the title track, "Brain of the Firm", and part of "Second Galactic Utopia". Paul Simpson of AllMusic wrote that Horse Lords used the human voice as a compositional element for the first time, with Guo and Saylor's voices electronically manipulated and stretched into additional musical material. Simpson also connected the album to the band's existing use of just intonation and microtonal harmony.

In the Quietus, Jakub Knera wrote that the Sacred Harp-derived phrase at the beginning of the album becomes a recurring sonic and conceptual center, with the words and voices repeatedly reworked across the record. He described the title track as combining post-punk, krautrock, and electronic dance music, and argued that the album's repetition of small vocal and lyrical elements gave the record continuity without making it a standard concept album. Bill Cooper of Spectrum Culture emphasized the album's balance of groove and dissonance, writing that the first half was more accessible before later tracks such as "Before the Law", "After the Last Sky", "Second Galactic Utopia", and the title track increased the level of difficulty. Jeff Terich of Treble wrote that the record draws together funk, post-punk, progressive rock, Sacred Harp music, minimalism, microtonalism, and math rock.

== Release and promotion ==
Horse Lords announced Demand to Be Taken to Heaven Alive! on March 17, 2026. "Eureka 378-B" and "Brain of the Firm" were released that day as singles, each with a video directed by Scott Kiernan. The announcement also included North American and European tour dates in support of the album.

"First Galactic Utopia" followed on April 28, 2026, with a video directed by Alexander Stewart. RVNG shared the title track on June 9, 2026, with a video using Dan Conrad's Chromaccord light-art instrument, shot and edited by Will Schorre. The album was released on June 12, 2026, in vinyl, CD, Japanese import CD licensed to Plancha, and digital editions.

== Critical reception ==
Professional ratings
Aggregate scores
Source	Rating
Metacritic	79/100
Review scores
Source	Rating
Pitchfork	7.6/10
PopMatters	7/10
Spectrum Culture	80%

At Metacritic, which assigns a normalized rating out of 100 to reviews from mainstream critics, Demand to Be Taken to Heaven Alive! received a score of 79 based on seven critic reviews, indicating "generally favorable" reception. The site listed all seven reviews as positive.

Jayson Greene of Pitchfork wrote that the added bass clarinet, trombone, and vocals gave the album a softer and more approachable character than Horse Lords' earlier work, while treating Guo and Saylor's voices as a major change in the band's sound. Knera, reviewing the album for the Quietus, interpreted the vocal fragments as recurring motifs and wrote that the record's coherence came from dismantling and reusing its opening lyrical material. Blackwell wrote in Bandcamp Daily that the album kept the band's interest in algorithms and polyrhythms while translating its live-group precision into a remotely made record.

Simpson wrote for AllMusic that the album continued Horse Lords' work with just intonation and microtonal harmony while adding the human voice as a new compositional tool. Ingalls of PopMatters wrote that the guest vocals and instruments broadened the band's sound without disrupting its established style. Cooper of Spectrum Culture characterized the album as boundary-pushing but accessible for listeners new to the band. Terich, writing for Treble, praised the sequencing and said the album was most rewarding when heard as a complete record.

The Quietus and Treble selected Demand to Be Taken to Heaven Alive! as Album of the Week, while Bandcamp Daily named it Album of the Day.

== Track listing ==
Demand to Be Taken to Heaven Alive! track listing
No.	Title	Length
1.	"Eureka 378-B"	0:57
2.	"Brain of the Firm"	4:40
3.	"Rotation I"	0:09
4.	"Playing and Reality"	1:21
5.	"Rotation II"	0:10
6.	"First Galactic Utopia"	3:58
7.	"Rotation III"	1:29
8.	"Before the Law"	3:45
9.	"After the Last Sky"	6:00
10.	"A City Yet to Come"	6:39
11.	"Second Galactic Utopia"	3:09
12.	"Demand to Be Taken to Heaven Alive!"	8:28
Total length:		40:45

== Personnel ==
Credits adapted from Bandcamp.

Horse Lords

- Max Eilbacher - bass guitar, computer
- Andrew Bernstein - saxophone, percussion, computer
- Sam Haberman - drums
- Owen Gardner - guitar, percussion, mixing

Additional musicians

- Nina Guo - vocals
- Evelyn Saylor - vocals
- Madison Greenstone - bass clarinet
- Weston Olencki - trombone

Technical and artwork

- Adam Asnan - recording
- Jared Paolini - recording
- Heba Kadry - mastering
- Jacob Clements - mastering assistance
- Josh Bonati - lacquer cut
- Will Work for Good - original artwork and design
