= Le pas du chat noir =

Studio album by Anouar Brahem
- Released: September 9, 2002
- Recorded: July 2001
- Studio: Radio DRS; Zurich, Switzerland
- Genre: Jazz
- Length: 70:32
- Label: ECM; ECM 1792
- Producer: Manfred Eicher

Anouar Brahem chronology
Astrakan café (2000)	Le pas du chat noir (2002)	Le voyage de Sahar (2006)

Le pas du chat noir (French, 'The Black Cat's Footsteps') is an album by Tunisian oud player Anouar Brahem recorded in July 2001 and released on ECM September the following year. The trio features pianist François Couturier and accordion player Jean-Louis Matinier.

== Reception ==
Professional ratings
Review scores
Source	Rating
AllMusic	4/5 stars

The AllMusic review by Chris Nickson awarded the album 4 stars stating "The interplay between musicians is as delicate as lace—thoughtful, with everyone listening as much as playing. It's a record with many moments of great beauty."

== Track listing ==
All tracks are written by Anouar Brahem.

No.	Title	Length
1.	"Le pas du chat noir"	7:51
2.	"De tout ton cœur"	7:38
3.	"Leila au pays du carrousel"	6:33
4.	"Pique-nique à Nagpur"	4:11
5.	"Ç'est ailleurs"	8:02
6.	"Toi qui sait"	5:56
7.	"L'arbre qui voit"	6:07
8.	"Un Point bleu"	1:44
9.	"Les ailes du Bourak"	4:52
10.	"Rue du départ"	6:00
11.	"Leila au pays du carrousel, var."	5:36
12.	"Déjà la nuit"	5:10
Total length:		70:32

== Personnel ==
- Anouar Brahem – oud
- François Couturier – piano
- Jean-Louis Matinier – accordion
