= Barbaros Erköse =

- Born: 1936 (age 89–90); Bursa, Turkey
- Genres: Ottoman classical music Turkish makam music
- Occupation: composer
- Instruments: clarinet

Barbaros Erköse (born 1936) is a Turkish clarinet player, ensemble leader, and composer. Erköse began to play the clarinet at age 9. While he was in secondary school, he was playing at wedding ceremonies. Around the same time, Erköse quit school. When he was 12, the musician took clarinet lessons from Saffet Gündeğer. Erköse played fasıls as an opening for plays at Şen Tiyatro (the theater where İsmail Dümbüllü appeared) in Ankara, and after working here for five years, he took the entrance exam at Ankara Radio in 1955 and was employed by the organization. In 1961, after travelling to Istanbul for an entertainment show, Erköse began to work at Istanbul Radio. He played with such famous names as Nesrin Sipahi and Zeki Müren. Erköse also recorded with musicians such as Anouar Brahem and Peter Pannke and played numerous concerts abroad.

He was described as "the first Turkish Roman clarinetist to forge a path for fusion based on using a jazz- like framework for his improvisations".

== See also ==
- List of composers of classical Turkish music
