= Covey-Crump (surname) =

Covey-Crump is an English, double-barrelled surname. The name was created when Rev. Walter William Crump (1865–1949) took on the surname of his friend Rev. Richard Covey (1833–1903) in 1903. He formalised the change of his surname to "Covey-Crump" by deed poll in the same year, just before he married. His three sons were registered with the surname "Covey-Crump".

== People ==
The name may refer to the following:

- A.T.L. Covey-Crump (1907–1991), Commander of the Royal Navy and creator in 1955 of the Naval slang compendium Covey-Crump. (Note: A.T.L. Covey-Crump was the son of Walter William Covey-Crump. GRO Births Mar 1907 Covey-Crump Alwyn Thomas (mother Hilda Maria nee Porter) Luton 3b 373)
- Rogers Covey-Crump (born 1944), British tenor specialising in early music. (Note: Rogers Covey-Crump is the grandson of Walter William Covey-Crump, via W.W. Covey-Crump's son, musician Lewis Charles Leslie Covey-Crump (1904–1962). GRO Births Jun 1904 Covey-Crump Lewis C. L. (mother Hilda Sophia nee Porter) Luton 3b 395. Marriages Jun 1930 Covey-Crump Lewis C. L. (wife nee Edwards) St Albans 3a 2293. Births Mar 1944 Covey-Crump Rogers H. L. (mother nee Edwards) St. Albans 3a 2086.)
- Walter William Covey-Crump (1865–1949) Anglican canon, Freemason, and writer. (Note: GRO Marriages Jun 1903 Covey-Crump Walter William (wife Hilda Maria nee Porter) Ely 3b 1213)

== Naval slang or "jackspeak" compendium (1955) ==
- Covey-Crump, a compendium of Naval slang published within the Royal Navy in 1955. It is mentioned in A.T.L. Covey-Crump, Royal Navy#"Jackspeak" and Customs and traditions of the Royal Navy.

== See also ==
- Crump (surname)
- Covey (surname)
