= Tony Cisek =

Scenic designer for theater

Tony Cisek is an American scenic designer.

== Early life ==
In 1994, Cisek received his MFA in design from New York University's (NYU) Tisch School of the Arts.

== Career ==
After leaving NYU he collaborated with companies across the US including Roundabout Theatre Company, Arena Stage, Guthrie Theater, Goodman Theatre, Ford’s Theatre, South Coast Repertory, Milwaukee Repertory Theater, Portland Center Stage, Cincinnati Playhouse in the Park, Alliance Theatre, Actors Theatre of Louisville, Center Stage (theater) (Baltimore), Indiana Repertory Theatre, Syracuse Stage, New York Theatre Workshop, Cleveland Play House, Folger Theatre, The Kennedy Center, Round House Theatre, Studio Theatre (Washington, D.C.), GALA Theatre, Berkshire Theatre Festival, and Signature Theatre (Arlington, Virginia).

Cisek collaborated with lighting designer Dan Covey on more than 40 Washington, D.C. productions. The two designers worked together on two Off-Broadway productions, Beyond Glory (2007), and columbinus (2006).

== Recognition ==
Cisek received five Drammy Awards for Scenic Design for his work in Portland Center Stage. The production of Sometimes a Great Notion was featured in American Theatre magazine in September 2008.

The Barrymore Awards for Excellence in Theater (Theater Philadelphia) organization nominated Cisek for three Outstanding Scenic Design awards.

Cisek received four Helen Hayes Awards for Outstanding Scenic Design for his work in the Washington, D.C. area. Additionally, he was nominated eight other times for this award. The complete list follows:

- Things That Break at Theatre of the First Amendment (1998) (Received Award)
- Pericles at Washington Shakespeare Company (1999) (Nomination)
- Much Ado About Nothing at Folger Theatre (1999) (Received Award)
- Communicating Doors at Round House Theatre (2000) (Nomination)
- Leaving the Summer Land for Tribute Productions (2001) (Received Award)
- The Judas Kiss at Rep Stage (2002) (Received Award)
- Slaughter City for Theater Alliance at the H Street Playhouse (2004) (Nomination)
- Mary's Wedding for Theater Alliance at the H Street Playhouse (2005) (Nomination)
- Hannah & Martin at Theater J (2006) (Nomination)
- Black Pearl Sings! at Ford’s Theatre (2009) (Nomination)
- Henry VIII at Folger Theatre (2010) (Nomination)
- Two Trains Running at Round House Theatre (2014) (Nomination)
