= Jonathan Judge-Russo =

American actor and producer (born 1983)

- Born: January 19, 1983 (age 42); New York, New York, US
- Education: Circle in the Square Theatre School; Loyola University Maryland; Regis High School
- Occupation(s): Actor, producer
- Years active: 2008-Present

Jonathan Judge-Russo (born January 19, 1983) is an American actor and producer. He has acted on television, film, and the stage. He is perhaps best known for his roles as Jeremy on the Netflix original comedy series Unbreakable Kimmy Schmidt, Randy Platt and Gary Ryan on the NBC drama Law & Order: Special Victims Unit, as well as being the Founding Artistic Director of Animus Theatre Company in New York City. He is also a member of the cast of the controversial film A Rainy Day in New York, directed by Woody Allen.

== Education ==
Judge-Russo is a graduate of Circle in the Square Theatre School, The Stella Adler Studio of Acting, the British American Drama Academy, and The Actors Center. At the above combined institutions, he studied with Alan Langdon, Sir Ben Kingsley, Alan Rickman, Chris Bayes, Earle Gister, Edward Berkeley, and John Barton. He received a BA in Theatre and Creative Writing from Loyola University Maryland and graduated from Regis High School in 2001.

== Career ==
Jonathan Judge-Russo was a member of the cast of Jumpers for Goalposts at the Studio Theatre in Washington, DC, that received a 2016 nomination for a Helen Hayes Award for Outstanding Ensemble in a Play. He was a member of the cast of the Drama Desk Award nominated Falling at the Minetta Lane Theatre. Other New York credits include such theatres as the Signature Theatre (Somewhere with You), The Cherry Lane Theatre (John Patrick Shanley’s Where’s My Money?), The Irish Repertory Theatre (Eugene O’Neill’s Beyond the Horizon), the Irish Arts Center (The Irish Play), and the Irondale Center (Treasure Island). He has performed at the Metropolitan Opera on three occasions, in productions of La Fanciulla del West and Wozzeck. Judge-Russo has performed regionally in the world premiere of Seth Zvi Rosenfeld’s Downtown Race Riot (New York Stage and Film), the United States premiere of Tom Wells’ Jumpers for Goalposts (Studio Theatre), A Midsummer Night's Dream, Troilus and Cressida, and Comedy of Errors (all with the Chesapeake Shakespeare Company), as well as Othello with the Baltimore Shakespeare Festival. He played a lead role in the First National Tour of Echoes of Ireland, written by Frank McCourt and Malachy McCourt.

Judge-Russo has acted in such television shows as FBI: Most Wanted, Law & Order: Special Victims Unit (twice), Unbreakable Kimmy Schmidt, Elementary, Black Box, and White Collar as well as such films as A Rainy Day in New York, Chess and Eat Me.
