= Greater Baltimore Theater Awards =

American theater award

The Greater Baltimore Theater Awards are theater awards to recognize excellence in the professional theater in the Greater Baltimore, Maryland (USA) area since 2004.

- Performances must take place in Baltimore City, Baltimore County, Anne Arundel County or Howard County, Maryland.
- There must be at least four performances.
- Performances must be open to the public
- At least 50% of the cast must reside in the State of Maryland or the District of Columbia
- The production can not be produced by an educational institution by and for students of that institution

== Awards ==
Awards are given in the following categories:

- Outstanding Play (three awards)
- Outstanding Actress (three awards)
- Outstanding Actor (three awards)
- Outstanding Director (three awards)
- Outstanding Costume Design (one award)
- Outstanding Scenic Design (one award)
- Outstanding Experimental Production (one award)

== 2006 Award Winners ==
2006 Outstanding Play

- Opus- The Everyman Theatre
- King Lear Chesapeake Shakespeare Company
- Faith Healer- Performance Workshop Theatre

Outstanding Actress

- Megan Anderson, The Cripple of Inishmaan- The Everyman Theatre
- Nancy Asendorf, Ragtime- Toby's Dinner Theatre of Baltimore
- Kathrine Lyons, Faith Healer- Performance Workshop Theatre

Outstanding Actor

- James Denvil, Candida- The Everyman Theatre
- BJ Gailey, Taming of the Shrew- Chesapeake Shakespeare Company
- Bruce Nelson, School for Scandal- The Everyman Theatre

Outstanding Direction

- Vincent Lancisi, School for Scandal The Everyman Theatre
- John Vreeke, Opus- The Everyman Theatre
- Alex Willis, The Goat- Mobtown Players

Outstanding Scene Design

- Daniel Ettinger, TinTypes- Rep Stage

Outstanding Costume Design

- Gail Stewart Beach, School for Scandal- The Everyman Theatre

Outstanding Experimental Production

- Variations on Fear- Run of the Mill

== Past Award Winners ==
2005 Outstanding Play

- Frankie & Johnny...- The Everyman Theatre
- Kimberly Akimbo- Rep Stage
- Turn of the Screw- Fells Point Corner Theater

Outstanding Actress

- Deborah Hazlett, Frankie and Johnnie...- The Everyman Theatre
- Helen Hedman, Kimberly Akimbo- Rep Stage
- Dawn Ursula, Yellowman- The Everyman Theatre

Outstanding Actor

- Patrick Kilpatrick, A Midsummer Night's Dream- Chesapeake Shakespeare Company
- Patrick Martyn, House of Blue Leaves- Fells Point Corner Theater
- Lance Coadie Williams, The Children's Hour- Rep Stage/ The Everyman Theatre

Outstanding Direction

- Kasi Campbell, Kimberly Akimbo- Rep Stage
- Vincent Lancisi, Frankie & Johnny...- The Everyman Theatre
- Craig Allen Mummey, Assassins- Colonial Players

Outstanding Scene Design

- Lewis Shaw, Romeo and Juliet- Baltimore Shakespeare Festival

Outstanding Costume Design

- Kristina Lambdin and Jeanne Robin, A Midsummer Night's Dream- Chesapeake Shakespeare Company

Outstanding Experimental Production

- Variations on Desire- Run of the Mill

2004 Outstanding Play

- Arcadia- Rep Stage
- Much Ado About Nothing- Chesapeake Shakespeare Company
- Proof- The Everyman Theatre

Outstanding Actor

- Mitchell Hebert, Uncle Vanya- The Everyman Theatre
- Karl Miller, Arcadia- Rep Stage
- Jordan Siebert, Hedwig and the Angry Inch- Mobtown Players

Outstanding Actress

- Megan Anderson, Proof- Everyman Theatre
- Valerie Fenton, Much Ado About Nothing- Chesapeake Shakespeare Company
- Janine Gulisano, Miss Saigon- Toby's Dinner Theatre

Outstanding Director

- Vincent Lancisi, Proof- The Everyman Theatre
- Terry Long, Hedwig and the Angry Inch- Mobtown Players
- Rob McQuay and Toby Orenstein, Godspell- Toby's Dinner Theatre

Outstanding Design

- Tony Cisek, Kathleen Geldard & Dan Covey, The Seagull- Rep Stage
- Ed Zarkowski & Tony Gallahan, Hedwig and the Angry Inch- Mobtown Players
- John Raley, Debra Kim Sivigny & Scott Rosenfeld, Julius Caesar- Baltimore Shakespeare Festival

Experimental Production

- Hedwig and the Angry Inch- Mobtown Players
