= William Ayerst =

British missionary

William Ayerst (1830–1904) was an English clergyman and missionary. He was born at Dantzig on 16 March 1830, the eldest son of William Ayerst, vicar of Egerton, Kent. He studied at King's College, London from 1847–9, and graduated from Gonville and Caius College, Cambridge with a B.A. in 1853, and an M.A. in 1856. After being ordained as a deacon in 1853 and priest in 1854, he was appointed to All Saints, Gordon Square (1853–5), St Paul's, Lisson Grove (1855–7), and St Giles in the Fields (1857–9).

He departed England to serve as rector of St Paul's School, Calcutta, India. In 1861 he was appointed to a chaplaincy on the Bengal ecclesiastical establishment and was senior chaplain with the Khyber field force from 1879 to 1881, for which he was awarded the Afghanistan Medal.

After returning to England he was briefly principal of the London Society for Promoting Christianity amongst the Jews's missionary college and minister of the Jews' Episcopal Chapel at Cambridge Heath, before being appointed vicar of Hungarton with Twyford and Thorpe Satchville, in Leicestershire, in 1882. He was curate of Newton, Cambridgeshire, from 1888 to 1890.

In 1884 he opened a hostel, Ayerst Hall, in Cambridge to assist poorer men with their education at the University of Cambridge. In 1896 Ayerst Hall had to close due to lack of funds and the property was transferred to the Catholic Church. St Edmund's College, Cambridge occupies the buildings.

Supporters of the deposed Bishop of Natal, John Colenso (died 1883) offered the bishopric to Ayerst. Attempts were made to obtain consecration but this was definitely refused by the Archbishop of Canterbury, Edward White Benson on 21 October 1891. During his later years Ayerst lived quietly in London, where he died on 6 April 1904.

== Notable students of Ayerst Hall ==
A later vicar of St James, Newton-in-the-Isle, (1935–1942) was Walter William Covey-Crump, a former student of Ayerst Hall.
