= Covey (disambiguation) =

Covey usually refers to group of certain birds such as partridges or quails.

Covey may also refer to:

- Covey (surname)
- Covey (folk rock project)
- Covey, a fictional band from The Ballad of Songbirds and Snakes, a novel by Suzanne Collins

== See also ==
- FranklinCovey, provider of business education and training based on Stephen Covey's writings
- Smith's Ballpark, Utah baseball stadium formerly known as Franklin Covey Field
- 20th Tactical Air Support Squadron used Covey as its call sign during the Vietnam War (Second Indochina War)
