= Scott Burgess =

Scott Burgess may refer to:

- Scott Burgess (sound designer), American audio engineer, composer, sound designer and performer
- Scott Burgess (actor) (1959–2016), Australian actor
- Scott Burgess (footballer) (born 1996), English footballer
