= Circle in the Square Theatre School =

American non-profit drama school

Coordinates: 40°45′44″N 73°59′04″W

Circle in the Square Theatre School is a non-profit, tax exempt drama school associated with Circle in the Square Theatre; it is the only accredited conservatory attached to a Broadway theatre.

It offers two 2-year full-time programs: a Professional Theatre Workshop, and a Professional Musical Theatre Workshop. The musical theatre program is unique in that it is identical to the acting program, except for additional musical classes. There is also an option to earn a joint BFA in Theatre or Musical Theatre with Eckerd College in Florida.

Additionally, Circle offers seven-week summer intensives for acting and musical theatre students.

Circle in the Square Theatre School's primary objective is to train actors and singers for work in professional theatre, film, and television; it utilizes an eclectic curriculum to expose the students to various acting styles, methods, and techniques.

Theodore Mann started the highly selective school in 1961 with 15 students in a Greenwich Village venue on Bleecker Street when Circle in the Square Theatre was an Off-Broadway venue. In 1972, it moved to its current Broadway location in the Paramount Plaza. In 2010, between its two-year program and summer program, it had approximately 200 students. Jacqueline Brookes, the Broadway actor, was a member of the faculty from 1973 until her death in April 2013.

Circle in the Square Theatre School offers its students the rare opportunity to train and perform in the Broadway Theatre, and see the shows at Circle for free.

== Notable alumni ==
The school site lists the following alumni.

- Mili Avital
- Kevin Bacon
- Elise Bauman
- John Bolger
- Lani Brockman
- Richard Brooks
- Woody Brown
- Greg Bryk
- Kevin Cahoon
- Rachel Chagall
- Sarah Clarke
- Ed Clements
- Viola Davis
- Shae D'lyn
- Benicio del Toro
- Lisa Edelstein
- Lisa Emery
- Linda Fiorentino
- Patrick Fischler
- Lady Gaga
- Amy Gaipa
- Barbara Garrick
- Gina Gershon
- Amanda Green
- Page Hannah
- Cecil Hoffman
- Philip Seymour Hoffman
- Winnie Holzman
- Felicity Huffman
- Rick Hurst
- Kristen Johnston
- Denis Jones
- Jonathan Judge-Russo
- Justin Kirk
- Michael E. Knight
- Jonathan LaPaglia
- Jill Larson
- Matthew Lillard
- Jessica Lundy
- Jodie Markell
- Alec Mapa
- Andrew McCarthy
- John C. McGinley
- Idina Menzel
- Michelle Monaghan
- Kate O'Toole
- Ken Olin
- Nicole Ari Parker
- Steven Peterman
- Robert Picardo
- Michael Rispoli
- Thomas Sadoski
- Dahlia Salem
- Jana Schneider
- Molly Shannon
- Rondell Sheridan
- Zenobia Shroff
- Peter Stebbings
- Amy Stiller
- D. B. Sweeney
- Maura Tierney
- Nancy Travis
- Marco Zunino
- Arnetia Walker
- Kevin Weisman
- Kate Wetherhead
- John Whitesell
