= Dan Covey =

American lighting designer and projections designer

Dan Covey is a lighting designer and projections designer for the theater, working professionally since 1980.

He studied at West Virginia University from 1976 to 1980. After leaving WVU, he worked for Walt Disney Parks and Resorts, for a variety of theaters in Boston, and recently as a lighting designer and theater renovation advisor in Washington, D.C. He and scenic designer Tony Cisek worked together on more than 40 Washington productions. They also worked together on two Off-Broadway productions, Beyond Glory (2007), and columbinus (2006). Covey designed the lights at Ford's Theatre for their 2019 production of Twelve Angry Men. Regionally, Covey designed lights at Hangar Theatre in Ithaca, NY, with a production of 'Gem of the Ocean.' In Chicago, Covey designed the lights at The Goodman Theatre for their 2005 presentation of Beyond Glory.

== Awards and nominations ==
Covey received a 2008 Drammy Award for Lighting Design for Portland Center Stage's new production of Sometimes a Great Notion. This production was featured in American Theatre magazine in September 2008.

He also received the 2001 Helen Hayes Award for Outstanding Lighting Design for his work on The Tempest at the Folger Theatre.

He has been nominated thirteen other times for the Helen Hayes Award as follows:

- Dangerous Liaisons at Rep Stage (1999)
- Edmond at Source Theatre Company (2000)
- Leaving the Summer Land for Tribute Productions (2001)
- Macbeth at Folger Theatre (2002)
- Slaughter City for Theater Alliance at the H Street Playhouse (2004)
- The Return to Morality at Rep Stage (2004)
- Mary's Wedding for Theater Alliance at the H Street Playhouse (2005)
- Merlin and the Cave of Dreams at Imagination Stage (2005)
- Hannah & Martin at Theater J (2006)
- In the Heart of America at Rep Stage (2009)
- On the Verge, or The Geography of Yearning at Rep Stage (2011)
- Dontrell, Who Kissed the Sea for Theater Alliance at the Anacostia Playhouse (2016)
- The Glass Menagerie at Ford's Theatre (2017)
