= Gaipa =

Gaipa is a surname. Notable people with the surname include:

- Amy Gaipa (born 1970), American actress
- Corrado Gaipa (1925–1989), Italian actor
