= Walter William Covey-Crump =

English Anglican priest

Canon Walter William Covey-Crump
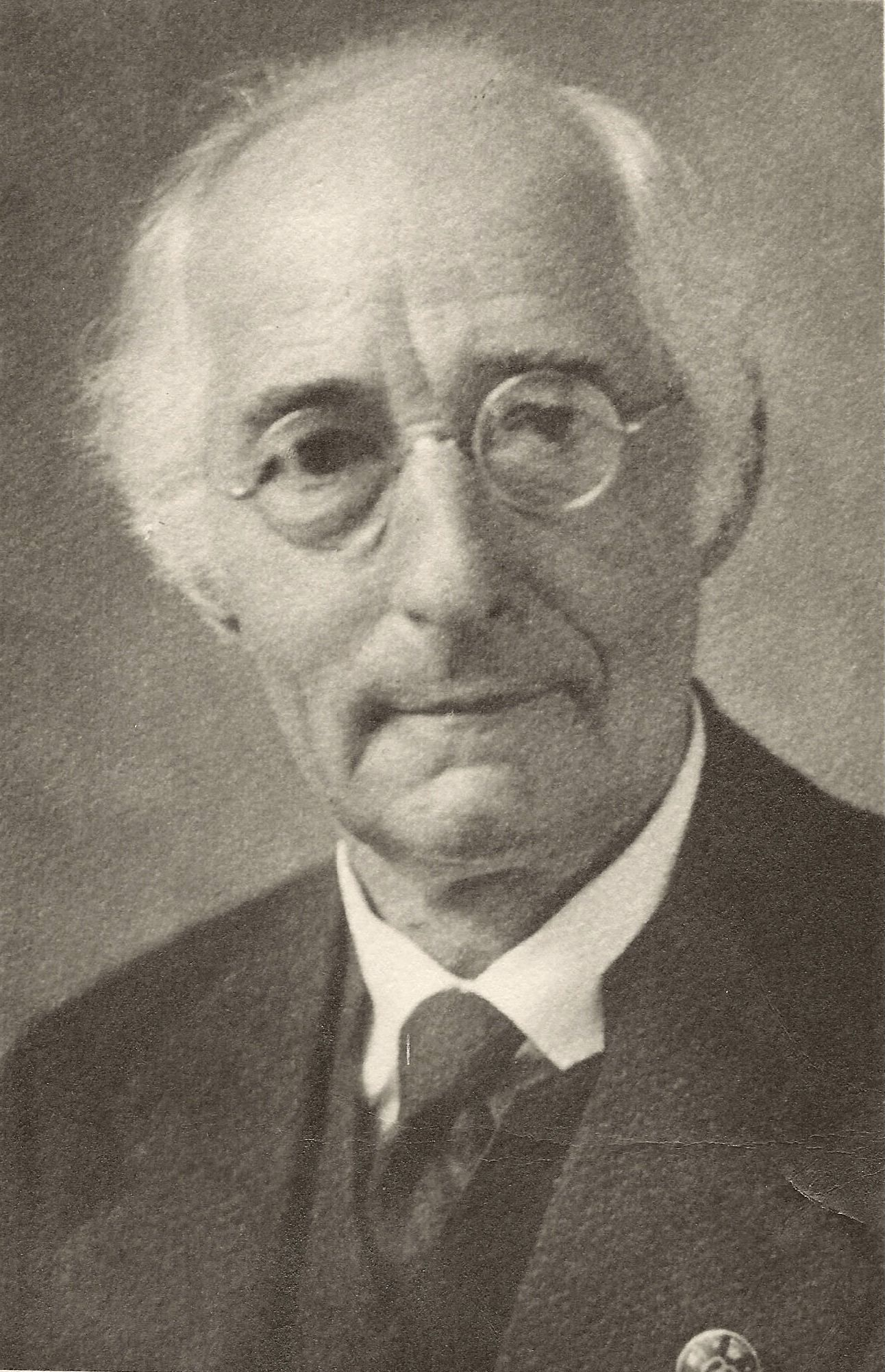
- Born: Walter William Crump; 4 October 1865; Birmingham, England
- Died: 27 April 1949 (aged 83); Ely, Cambridgeshire, England
- Education: Ayerst Hall
- Occupations: Priest, writer
- Years active: 1892–1949
- Children: A.T.L. Covey-Crump
- Religion: Anglicanism
- Ordained: Deacon 1892, priest 1893 Ely
- Writings: Books on Freemasonry, e.g. Hiramic Tradition (1934)

Signature
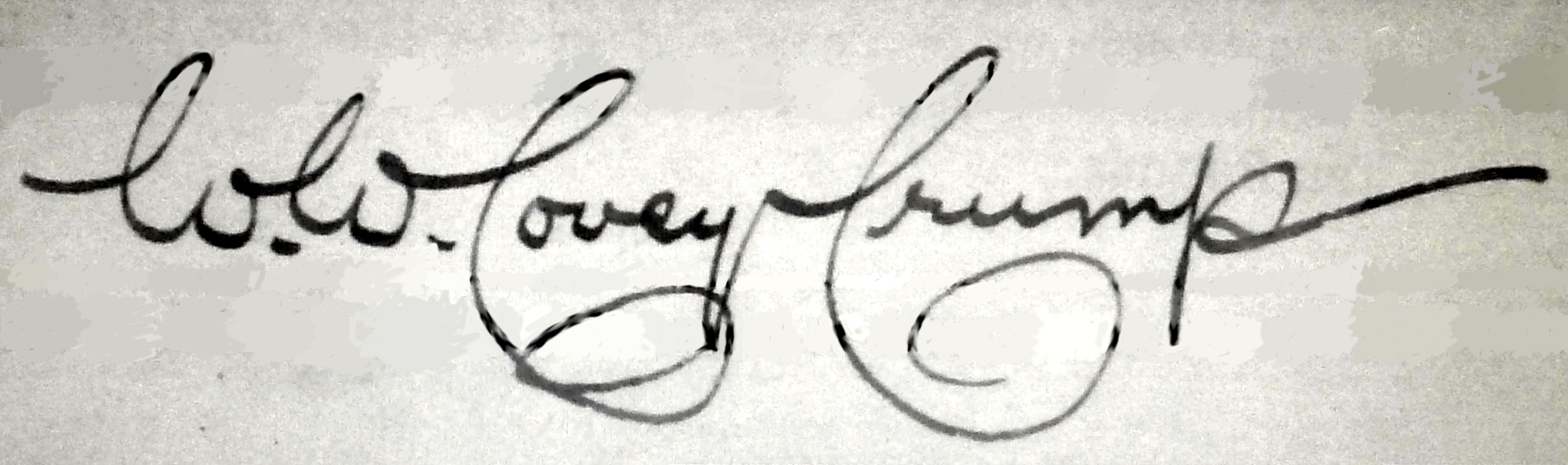

Canon Walter William Covey-Crump (1865–1949) was an Anglican priest, serving as curate and vicar in the diocese of Ely, Cambridgeshire for over fifty years. He also held "high positions" as a Freemason, involving himself in Masonic research. He produced numerous theological and Masonic publications, some of which were still being reprinted in the 21st century.

He came from a modest background, but was accepted as an undergraduate at Ayerst Hall, Cambridge, where he underwent theological training. He inherited the surname, "Crump", but took on the additional name of "Covey" from his friend Richard Covey, bursar of Ayerst Hall and fellow curate in Cambridgeshire. He was married with three sons, the second of whom was Commander A.T.L. Covey-Crump. His grandson is Rogers Covey-Crump.

== Background ==
Covey-Crump came from a modest background. His paternal grandparents were agricultural labourer William Crump, (Note: William Crump (born Condover c. 1807)) and his wife Ann. (Note: Ann Crump wife of William Crump (born Much Wenlock c. 1809)) His parents were merchant's clerk and cooper, Richard Crump, (Note: Richard Crump (Pitchford 1836 – Kings Norton 1902). Deaths Dec 1902 Crump Richard 68 King's N. 6c 252.) and Elizabeth Prestidge. (Note: Elizabeth Prstidge Crump wife of William Crump (born Birmingham c. 1842)) He was born as Walter William Crump in Birmingham on 4 October 1865. When he was fourteen, he was apprenticed to a book-printer of evangelical tendencies, and attended his youth Bible class.

=== Education and training ===
It was after attending evening classes that Crump was able to win a scholarship to Ayerst Hall, Cambridge, "a hostel ... designed to aid men of modest means in obtaining a university degree and theological training", where he read mathematics, and received his Bachelor of Arts in 1891, and his Master of Arts in 1895. His landlord in Cambridge was Richard Covey, who by then was old and nearly blind, so that Crump had to read to him. This sparked an interest in "ancient languages including Hebrew, Sanskrit, Egyptian Hieroglyphics and Greek". In 1891 it was Richard Covey who sponsored him financially at the Cambridge Clergy Training School.

=== Double-barrelled surname ===
Covey-Crump's parents were named Crump, and they registered him with that name. When he became curate of Cottenham, Cambridgeshire, he again met Reverend Richard Covey, (Note: Richard Covey (Birmingham c. 1833 – Cambridge 2 August 1903). GRO index: Deaths Sep 1903 Covey Richard 69 Cambridge 3b 246. Probate 23 October 1903 Peterborough, £1502 to Rev. Gee and McMurray, tailor.) the unmarried curate of nearby Rampton, and friend of the family who had been bursar of Ayerst Hall when Crump was an undergraduate, and had assisted him with educational sponsorship. (Note: Covey was the son of Charles Covey (c. 1799-1875). (See GRO Deaths Mar 1875 Covey Charles 79 Winchcombe 6a 341). surgeon to the Birmingham Dispensary.) The 1891 census finds "Walter William Crump" visiting Covey at his rectory in Dry Drayton parish. Richard Covey drew up his last will in 1901, leaving the most part of his estate to Walter William Crump. There was no suggestion in the will that Crump should add Covey's name to his as a condition of the legacy. (Note: General Record Office: Last Will and Testament of Richard Covey ref. COW165709699003G. Proved 23 October 1903. He left £1309 18s 0d. net.) Crump took on the additional name of Covey before Richard Covey died. (Note: The report in the Saffron Walden Weekly News contains a typo. It should say, "[The rector of Cottenham] was succeeded by Mr Crump. On the same day Mr Covey (not Covey-Crump) came to be curate at Rampton, and [Crump] took his name before [Covey] died.) He formalised the name, "Covey", by deed poll on 5 March 1903, shortly before he married; by that time he was already using it as a double-barrelled surname. His immediate family was using the surname, Covey-Crump, by 1911, as recorded in the census, and in the registered surnames of his children.

=== Marriage ===
Covey-Crump's wife was Hilda Sophia née Porter, (Note: Hilda Sophia Crump née Porter (Haddenham 1879 – Ely 1968). Births Sep 1879 Porter Hilda Sophia Ely (which includes Haddenham) 3b 539. Deaths Jun 1968 Covey-Crump Hilda S. 88 Ely 4A 306.) and they married on 11 June 1903 at St Mary's Church, St Neots, where he was serving as curate. (Note: Marriages Jun 1903 Crump Walter William C. and Porter Hilda Sophia, Ely 3b 1213) Covey-Crump had three sons: musician Lewis Charles Leslie, (Note: Lewis Charles Leslie Covey-Crump (1904–1962). Births Jun 1904 Covey-Crump Lewis C. L. Luton 3b 395. Deaths Sep 1962 Covey-Crump Lewis C.L. 58 Marylebone 5d 253.) Commander Alwyn Thomas Lavender Covey-Crump, (Note: A.T.L. Covey-Crump (19 February 1907–19 May 1991). Births Mar 1907 Covey-Crump Alwyn Thomas Luton 3b 373.) and Leo William Rolf M.A. (King's), (Note: Leo William Rolf Covey-Crump (1910–2001). Births Jun 1910 Covey-Crump Leo William R. Luton 3b 364.) who served in the Royal Naval Voluntary Reserve in World War II. His grandson, via his son Lewis Charles Leslie, is the musician Rogers Covey-Crump. (Note: Rogers Covey-Crump is the grandson of Walter William Covey-Crump, via W.W. Covey-Crump's son, musician Lewis Charles Leslie Covey-Crump (1904–1962). GRO Births Jun 1904 Covey-Crump Lewis C. L. (mother Hilda Sophia nee Porter) Luton 3b 395. Marriages Jun 1930 Covey-Crump Lewis C. L. (wife nee Edwards) St Albans 3a 2293. Births Mar 1944 Covey-Crump Rogers H. L. (mother nee Edwards) St. Albans 3a 2086.) Covey-Crump died in Ely on 27 April 1949, (Note: Births Dec 1865 Crump Walter William Birmingham 6d 11. Deaths Jun 1949 Covey-Crump Walter W. 83 Ely 4a 266.) and left £2,882 net (equivalent to £88,053 in 2025). His funeral took place on 2 May 1949.

== Career ==
=== Curate ===
Covey-Crump's first position was the curacy of All Saints' Church, Cottenham, from 1892 to 1894. It was there that he learned bell-ringing, one of his lasting interests. Opening a fête 44 years later, he recalled his time there:

In those days the organist lived in Cambridge, and if he did not come we turned the handle of a barrel organ and ground the tune out ... The hymns went all right, but in the Psalms it was not so easy ... The clock had one hand and indicated the nearest quarter of an hour.

He was curate of St Mary the Virgin, Longstowe, from 1894 to 1895; of Holy Trinity, Haddenham, from 1896 to 1902; and of St Mary's Church, St Neots, from 1902 to 1904.

=== Vicar and rural dean ===
Covey-Crump was vicar of St Thomas, Stopsley, from 1904 to 1910. While there he was the subject of controversy when he became vice-chairman of the parish council, which was populated with Nonconformists, one of whom feared that he "would be casting a net to catch fish". At Stopsley he home-schooled his three children as a musical family. They all attended King's College School, and they all became members of the Choir of King's College, Cambridge. He was vicar of St Mark's Church, Friday Bridge, Cambridgeshire in the Ely diocese, from 1910.

From 1925 Covey-Crump was the rural dean of Wisbech. In 1932, the population of his parish was 930, and the net income from his benefice in that year was £370 (equivalent to £22,330 in 2025), plus tenancy of the Friday Bridge vicarage. On 5 July 1932, he gave "a most interesting lecture ... on the history of the Bible" to the Whittlesey Women's Institute. In July 1934 Covey-Crump was nominated to serve as rural dean of Wisbech for five years, although he resigned the position in 1938. He left the incumbency of Friday Bridge for that of St James, Newton-in-the-Isle, in 1935, writing a modest farewell note to his parishioners: "The energetic and popular rector ... Mr Wells ... is a clergyman of broad views and varied experience who will, I am sure, do his utmost to carry on the organisations in the parish, and may succeed in other ways wherein I have failed. I ask you, therefore, to give him a cordial welcome". He was invited to crown the Rose Queen at the 1935 Rose Queen Festival at Sutton St James, where he gave a speech on the emblem of the rose in that type of crowning ceremony.

=== Canon ===
He was nominated to the honorary canonry in Ely Cathedral in March 1936, by the Bishop of Ely, Dr Bernard Heywood, who said that "he could find no-one more worthy than the rector of Newton. The honour is one that has been well earned by the rural dean who since his ordination has given the whole of his service, over more than 50 years, in the diocese". Covey-Crump retired in 1942, aged 77 years. However he continued to officiate at weddings.

== Institutions ==
=== Freemasonry ===
Covey-Crump was a Freemason from at least 1910. "He [was] well known in the Masonic world, having held high positions and taken a great part in Masonic research". On 12 January 1927, he was appointed and invested a prelate of the Order of the Red Cross of Constantine at Mark Masons' Hall, London. At some point before 1936 he was Assistant Grand Chaplain of England. In 1936 Covey-Crump read an "address dealing with certain historical aspects of Masonic emblems" to the 54th regular meeting of the Suffolk Installed Masters' Lodge of Freemasons at Saxmundham.

=== Other institutions ===
Covey-Crump was elected general secretary of the Wisbech branch of the Society for the Propagation of the Gospel in Foreign Parts (SPG) in June 1930. He was also a vice-president of Wisbech Museum in 1936.

== Publications ==
=== Anglican publications ===
- Covey-Crump, W.W. (December 2005). Adoram, Adoniram, Abel, Zechariah and Abdemon. Kessinger Publishing, LLC. ISBN 9781425300753. (Reprint; original publication date 1 January 1914).
- Covey-Crump, W.W. (1 April 1916). "The Situation of Tarshish". The Journal of Theological Studies. os–XVII (4): 280–290. doi:10.1093/jts/os-XVII.4.280.

=== Masonic publications ===
- Covey-Crump, W.W., (1915) The Symbolic Significance of the Middle Chamber.
- Covey-Crump, W.W. (1917). The Craft and the Kabalah..
- Covey-Crump, W.W. (1920). Early History of the Ark Mariners' Degree. UK: R.A.M. Lodge..
- Covey-Crump, W.W., (1920) Our Symbolic System.
- Covey-Crump, W.W., (1929) Biblical Evidence Concerning Hiram.
- Covey-Crump, W.W. (1930). The "intermediate Degrees" of the A. & A. Rite Preliminary to Perfection in the Rose Croix. UK: "Masonic Record" Office. (Also further editions in 1936 and 1956).
- Covey-Crump, W.W. (March 2014). Hiramic Tradition. UK: Literary Licensing, LLC. ISBN 9781494124724. (Original publication: Covey-Crump, W.W., The Hiramic Tradition: a Survey of Hypotheses Concerning it (1934), Masonic record, Incorporated). There was also an earlier version as a paper (1932).
- Covey-Crump, W.W. (1937). History and Allegory in the Royal Arch Ritual An Address Delivered at the Regular Meeting of The Chapter Attached to the Constitution Lodge, No. 3392, Manchester on 26th January, 1937. UK: Constitution Lodge, No. 3392..
- Covey-Crump, W.W., (1948) The Rainbow – a Sign.
- Covey-Crump, W.W. (15 September 2006). The Fall of Man, the Death of Jesus and the Legend of Hiram Abiff. Kessinger Pub Co. ISBN 978-1428681118. (Reprint; original publication date unknown).
- Covey-Crump, W.W. (15 September 2006). King Charles I, the Jacobites and the Hiramic Tradition. Kessinger Pub Co. ISBN 978-1428681101. (Reprint: original publication date unknown).
- Covey-Crump, W.W. (15 September 2006). Jacques De Molay, the Templars and the Hiramic Tradition. Kessinger Pub Co. ISBN 978-1428681095. (Reprint: original publication date unknown)
- Covey-Crump, W.W. (15 September 2006). An Introduction to the Legend of Hiram Abiff or the Hiramic Tradition. Kessinger Pub Co. ISBN 978-1428681088. (Reprint: original publication date unknown)
- Covey-Crump, W.W. (15 September 2006). Did the Hiramic Tradition First Originate in Rosicrucianism?. Kessinger Pub Co. ISBN 978-1428681071. (Reprint: original publication date unknown)
- Covey-Crump, W.W. (15 September 2006). When Was the Hiramic Tradition First Introduced into Masonic Craft Ritual?. Kessinger Pub Co. ISBN 978-1428681064. (Reprint: original publication date unknown)
- Covey-Crump, W.W. (15 September 2006). Hiram Of The Of The Biblical Story. Kessinger Pub. Co. ISBN 978-1428681057. (Reprint: original publication date unknown)
- Covey-Crump, W.W. (15 September 2006). The Compagnonnage Legend and the Hiramic Legend. Kessinger Pub Co. ISBN 978-1428681040. (Reprint: original publication date unknown)
- Covey-Crump, W.W. (15 September 2006). Was the Hiramic Tradition a Variant from the Osirian Mystery?. Kessinger Pub Co. ISBN 978-1428681033. (Reprint: original publication date unknown)

=== General publications ===
- Covey-Crump, W.W. (September 2010). Myths of Persephone, Hecate, Orpheus, Iacchos, Adonis, Tammuz and Mithra. Kessinger Publishing, LLC. ISBN 9781163014530. (Reprint; original publication date unknown)
