= Covey (surname) =

Covey is a surname. Notable people with the surname include:

- Arthur Covey (1877–1960), American muralist
- Britain Covey (born 1997), American football player
- Craig Covey (born 1957), American politician
- Dan Covey, American lighting designer
- Deb Covey (born 1961), Canadian field hockey player
- Dylan Covey (born 1991), American baseball player
- Edward Covey (1805–1875), American slaveholder
- Fran Covey, American politician
- Fred Covey (1881–1957), world champion in real tennis
- Gerald Covey (1927–1986), Canadian sprint canoeist
- Hyatt E. Covey (1975–1968), American politician
- James Covey (1819–??), African interpreter
- Joy Covey (1963–2013), American business executive
- Preston Covey (c. 1941 – 2006), American philosopher
- Rachel Covey (born 1998), American child actress
- Richard O. Covey (born 1946), American astronaut
- Rosemary Feit Covey, American printmaker
- Sean Covey (born 1964), American motivational speaker and author, son of Stephen
- Stephen Covey (1932–2012), American author of The Seven Habits of Highly Effective People
- Suzy Covey (1939–2007), American librarian and scholar of comics
- Sylvie Covey (born 1954) French-born American visual artist, author

== See also ==
- Covey-Crump (surname)
- Wendi McLendon-Covey, American actress
