= House of Colville =

Anglo-Norman family in England

The House of Colville (Colvin) is an Anglo-Norman family in England. The family originated from a Knight named Gilbert de Collevile of Colleville Sur Mer, Bessin, Normandy, France. Colleville-sur-Mer is next to the Beach, codenamed Omaha during WW II. During the conquest of England by William the Conqueror, in 1066, Gilbert was granted 22,000 acres of land near Devonshire England as his reward for his service. The name was shortened years latter from Colville to Colvin. Some family members kept the old name Colville. It was from this Knight that the Colvin/Calvin family would develop. The Colvin name is also written in the Domesday Book. The Colvins were Anglo-Norman. Some of the Colvin clan moved to Scotland, Ireland and France. The French Calvins spelled the name Cauvin and later changed to Calvin.They were French Huguenots. Huguenots were French Protestants of the 16 and 17th centuries, followers of John Calvin's Reformed tradition. The Domesday Book of 1086 records Gilbert's descendants as holding lands directly from the Crown in Yorkshire, specifically Arncliffe where the family would remain prominent for many centuries. Later a branch of the Colvilles also established themselves at Newton in the Isle of Ely.

One of the family's most notable titles is the Barony de Colville of Castle Bytham where from the 12th Century the family controlled a Barony with lands in excess of 25,000 acres (10,000 ha). One Sir John de Colvil was a surety for John Pelham for 1000 £ in 1430.

From the 17th century onwards, some members of the family switched to the use of Colvin, situated in Kent, Sussex, and later, London and the surrounding counties, notably at Monkhams Hall near Waltham Abbey, Essex.

The first Calvin/Colvin recorded in the new world was John Calvin in New England. In his Book, "The Calvin Families" by Claude W. Calvin, published in 1944, he found that John Calvin was the Great-Great Grandson of Antoine Calvin, the brother of John Calvin (the reformer). John Calvin arrived at the Plymouth Bay Colony about 1670. John was born in Glasgow, Scotland, in 1654. His mother, Janet died when he was 11. His father, Willian Calvin and his father's second wife, Mary Craig died at the same time in 1668, possibly of the Plague when he was 14. He was then sent to live with an uncle in Devon, England. It is said in 1670 at the age of 16, John ran away from his uncle's home and made his way to the docks in Bristol, England where he stowed away on a ship bound for the Plymouth Bay Colony. When found three days later, he was ordered to work as a cabin boy. Once he made it to Plymouth, Ma, he had to work for five years to pay off his passage. In April 8 1676 he became a Quaker and married Dorothy Allen and fathered nine children. The Marriage and birth records from Dartmouth MA. show the children of John and Dorothy as Colvin. Anna 3/26/1679, John Jr., 4/19/1681, Stephen 9/24/1683, Abigail 7/28/1686, Samuel 12/10/1688, Anne 10/31/1690, Deborah 5/28/1693, James 11/24/1695 ( a Baptist Minister), and Josiah 6/6/ 1700. In the 4th generation Peleg Colvin, and in the 5th generation Sandford Colvin, changed back to Calvin. From there the Calvin line continued in America. In 1704, John Colvin and his family moved to Coventry, RI, in the Red Oak section near the present village of Hope at about the time the town was founded. He had a large 300 acre farm. After a few years it had grown to over 4,000 acres of land and he was considered a man of great wealth. We know little of his time there other than farming. His wife Dorothy died in 1724 at the age of 70. In 1726 John married a widower, Mary Keech who was 67 at the time.They were married for three years. He died there in November 1729 at 75 years old. His heirs built a homestead during the middle of the 18 century. For many years, the farmlands, orchards and "great meadows" were worked by his descends. The old homestead, built along the shore of the Pawtuxet River, on the site of a former Indian settlements, remained in the Colvin family until 1910.
