= Colleville-sur-Mer =

- Commune
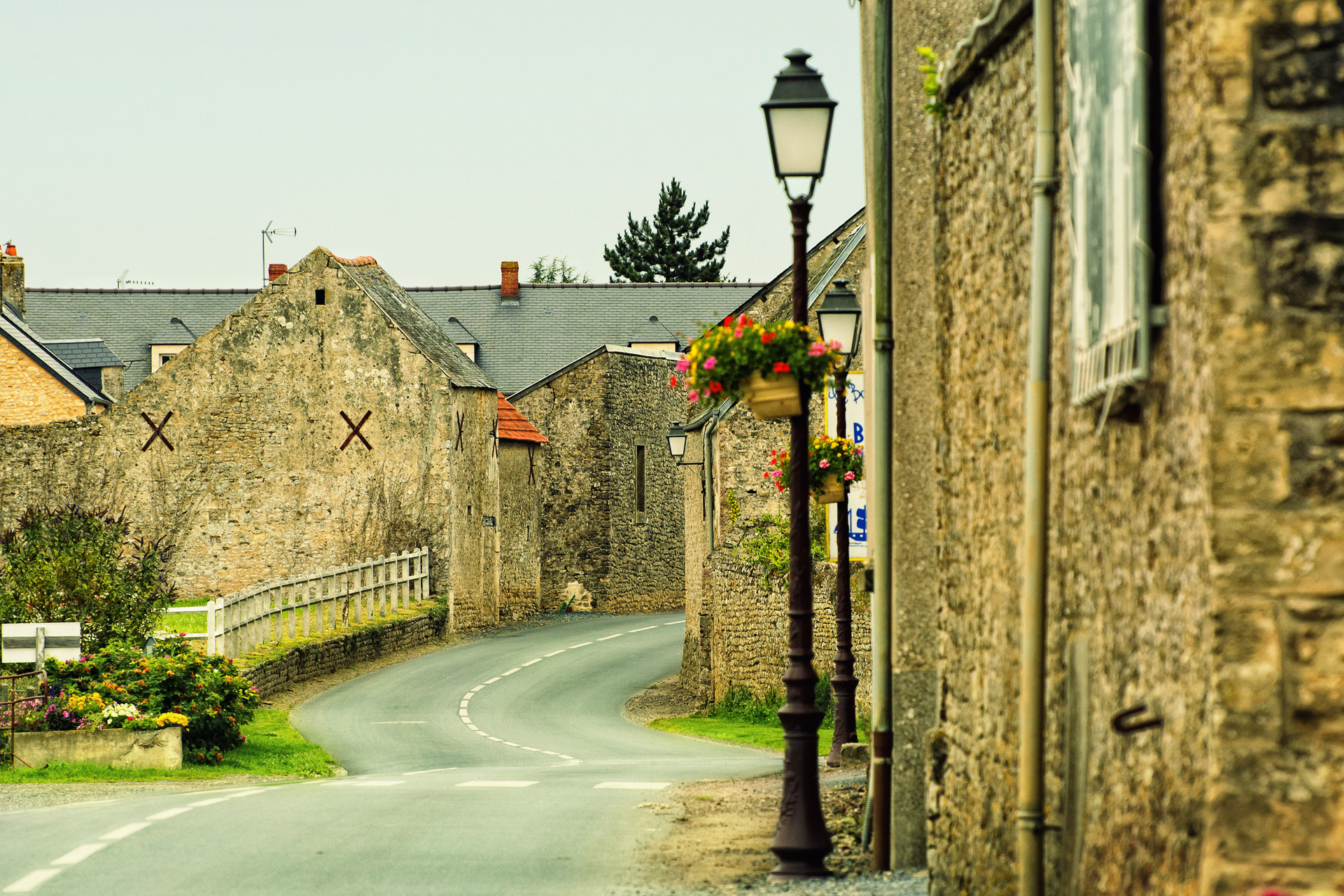
- Main street
- Location of Colleville-sur-Mer
- Location within France Location within Normandy
- Coordinates: 49°20′57″N 0°50′32″W
- Country: France
- Region: Normandy
- Department: Calvados
- Arrondissement: Bayeux
- Canton: Trévières
- Intercommunality: CC Isigny-Omaha Intercom

Government
  - Mayor (2020–2026): Patrick Thomines
- Area^{1}: 6.93 km^{2} (2.68 sq mi)
- Elevation: 70 m (230 ft)
- Population (2023): 207
  - Density: 29.9/km^{2} (77.4/sq mi)
- Time zone: UTC+01:00 (CET)
  - Summer (DST): UTC+02:00 (CEST)
- INSEE/Postal code: 14165 /14710
- ^{1} French Land Register data, which excludes lakes, ponds, glaciers > 1 km^{2} (0.386 sq mi or 247 acres) and river estuaries.

Colleville-sur-Mer (French pronunciation: [kɔlvil syʁ mɛʁ], literally Colleville on Sea) is a commune in the Calvados department in Normandie region in northwestern France.

== History ==
It was originally a farm owned by a certain Koli, a Scandinavian settler in the Middle Ages. It shares the same etymology as the other Colleville in Normandy. During the conquest of England by William the Conqueror or following it, Gilbert de Colleville was given lands in Devon England, it was from this Knight that the modern de Colville/Colvin family would develop, also including Clan Colville in Scotland and the Barony de Colville, of Castle Bytham in England.

The beach next to the coastal village was one of the principal beachheads during the Normandy landings on 6 June 1944, designated Omaha Beach.

== Population ==
Historical population
Year	Pop.	±% p.a.
1968	195	—
1975	180	−1.14%
1982	169	−0.90%
1990	146	−1.81%
1999	172	+1.84%
2007	166	−0.44%
2012	192	+2.95%
2017	175	−1.84%
2023	207	+2.84%
Source: INSEE

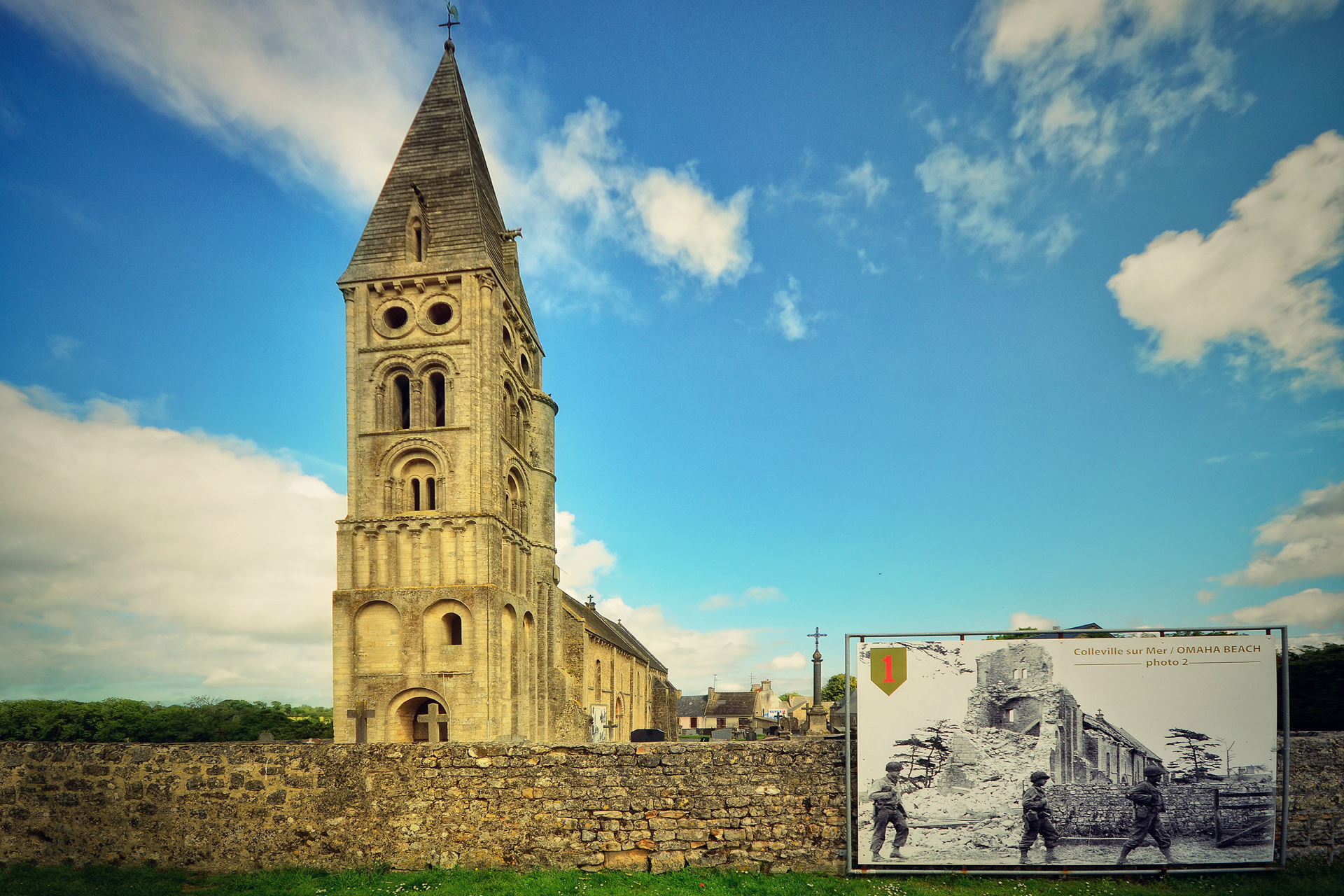
Notre-Dame de l'Assomption de Colleville

== Sights ==
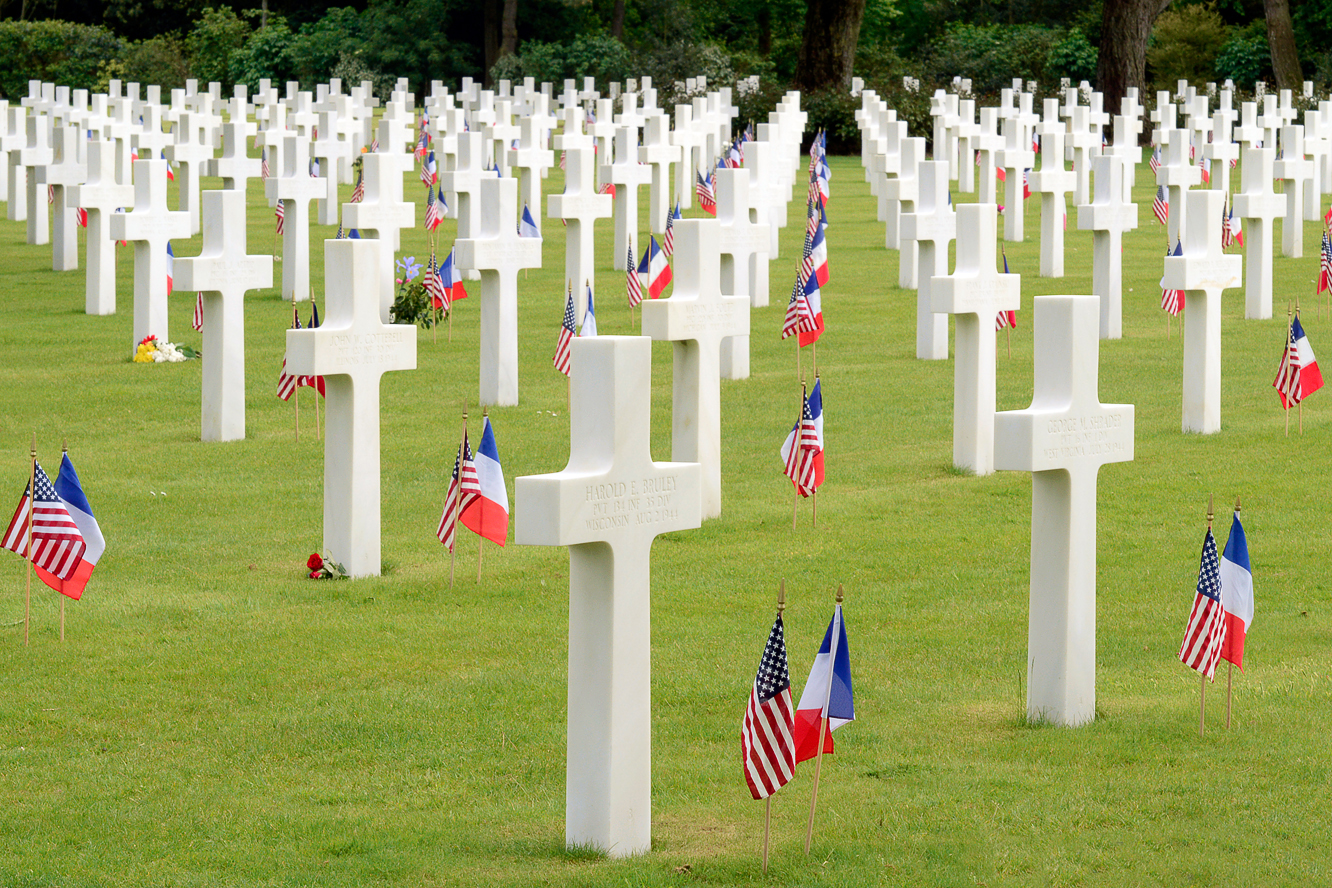
The Cemetery, June 2012

- Normandy American Cemetery and Memorial is located in Colleville-sur-Mer.
- Notre-Dame de l'Assomption de Colleville: dated to the 12th or 13th century, a historical monument since 1840.
- Overlord Museum is located in Colleville-sur-Mer.

== See also ==
- Colleville-Montgomery
- Communes of the Calvados department
