= Scott Burgess (sound designer) =

American audio engineer

- Education: University of North Texas
- Occupations: Composer, Sound Designer
- Spouse: Maia DeSanti

Scott Burgess is an American audio engineer, composer, musician, sound designer, voice over artist, and performer. In the category of Outstanding Sound Design, Resident Production, he is a ten-time nominee and a two-time winner of the Helen Hayes Award.

== Biography ==
Burgess was born in Colorado, the son of a United States military man. As a result of his father's assignments, he spent his early childhood in Europe. After his father's retirement from the Army, the family moved to Texas where Burgess did the majority of his growing up. There he discovered music and recording at an early age. Both were introduced to him by his father, a guitar player and reel to reel tape enthusiast. While still in high school Burgess received his radio operators license and worked as a Disc Jockey/On Air Personality at the local radio station hosting the evening "Rock Show". The radio station gave him the opportunity to continue his self-study of recording and audio equipment. Creating commercials and promos there, he learned the basics of professional production audio and developed his instinct for sound effects and music beds. After hours, he recorded himself and his band at the facilities teaching himself tape-to-tape recording, mixing and simple mastering techniques. At this time, he also began his pursuit of learning live engineering and P.A. equipment.

After High School, Burgess eventually attended the University of North Texas from 1982 to 1985 in Denton, Texas. While an undergraduate student there, he studied jazz performance and musical composition as well as film and video production. During this time, he also continued to record himself and bands using multi-track equipment in an early home "project studio" setting.

After college, Burgess played in several working bands performing in local clubs and festivals. In 1990 he moved to New York City where he continued to hone his composition and recording skills. There he began in true his professional composition and recording career having been commissioned to compose scores for dance companies and independent film makers. During this time he also played in several bands as a part of the original Off Wall Street Jam. While in New York he also met actress, future wife and life partner Maia DeSanti. In 1992 they decided to move to Washington D.C. where there was an established music scene and a strong and growing theater community.

In Washington DC, he found a home for his skills. He began working in local studios eventually landing a part-time job as an engineer and studio manager. Shortly after that he began working with local theater companies recording and producing original music and sound-scapes for theatrical productions. His original scores and sound designs for theater used complex sequencing and sampling techniques he learned in the studios working with Rap and Hip Hop artists. The designs were often created to comment explicitly on the action of the play, such as risqué movie quotes from John Wayne or the double entendre of Cole Porter's Let's Do It (Let's Fall In Love) for a provocative play such as Psychopathia Sexualis.

Burgess has been called The Music Man by The Washington Post because he composes sound designs and film scores based on a wide variety of instruments, influences and sampled sounds. In 2004, Burgess composed a film score for the documentary Crucible of War, about a refugee from Yugoslavia haunted by his past who returns to his post-war homeland.

Burgess continues to compose scores and create sound designs for theater, dance and film. He has also maintained his career as a live engineer and audio systems designer currently serving as head audio and video engineer for the Lang Performing Arts Center at Swarthmore College in the Greater Philadelphia Area. Burgess currently resides in Philadelphia however continues to work in Washington DC and in other regions ranging from Nantucket to Naples Florida.

== Helen Hayes Awards ==
1997	Outstanding Sound Design, Resident Production	
	Quills, Woolly Mammoth Theatre Company	Nomination
1998	Outstanding Sound Design, Resident Production	
	Romeo and Juliet, Folger Shakespeare Library	Award Recipient
1998	Outstanding Sound Design, Resident Production	
	Travels With My Aunt, Rep Stage	Nomination
1999	Outstanding Sound Design, Resident Production	
	Seven Guitars, The Studio Theatre	Nomination
2000	Outstanding Sound Design, Resident Production	
	The Adding Machine, Washington Jewish Theatre	Nomination
2001	Outstanding Sound Design, Resident Production	
	The Mystery of Irma Vep (a penny dreadful), Rep Stage	Nomination
2001	Outstanding Sound Design, Resident Production	
	The Tempest, Folger Theatre	Award Recipient
2003	Outstanding Sound Design, Resident Production	
	Knoyugogh, Little Globe Theater	Nomination
2003	Outstanding Sound Design, Resident Production	
	Othello, Folger Theatre	Nomination
2004	Outstanding Sound Design, Resident Production	
	Elizabeth the Queen, Folger Theatre	Nomination
