= A. T. L. Covey-Crump =

British naval officer (1907–1991)

Commander A. T. L. Covey-Crump RN
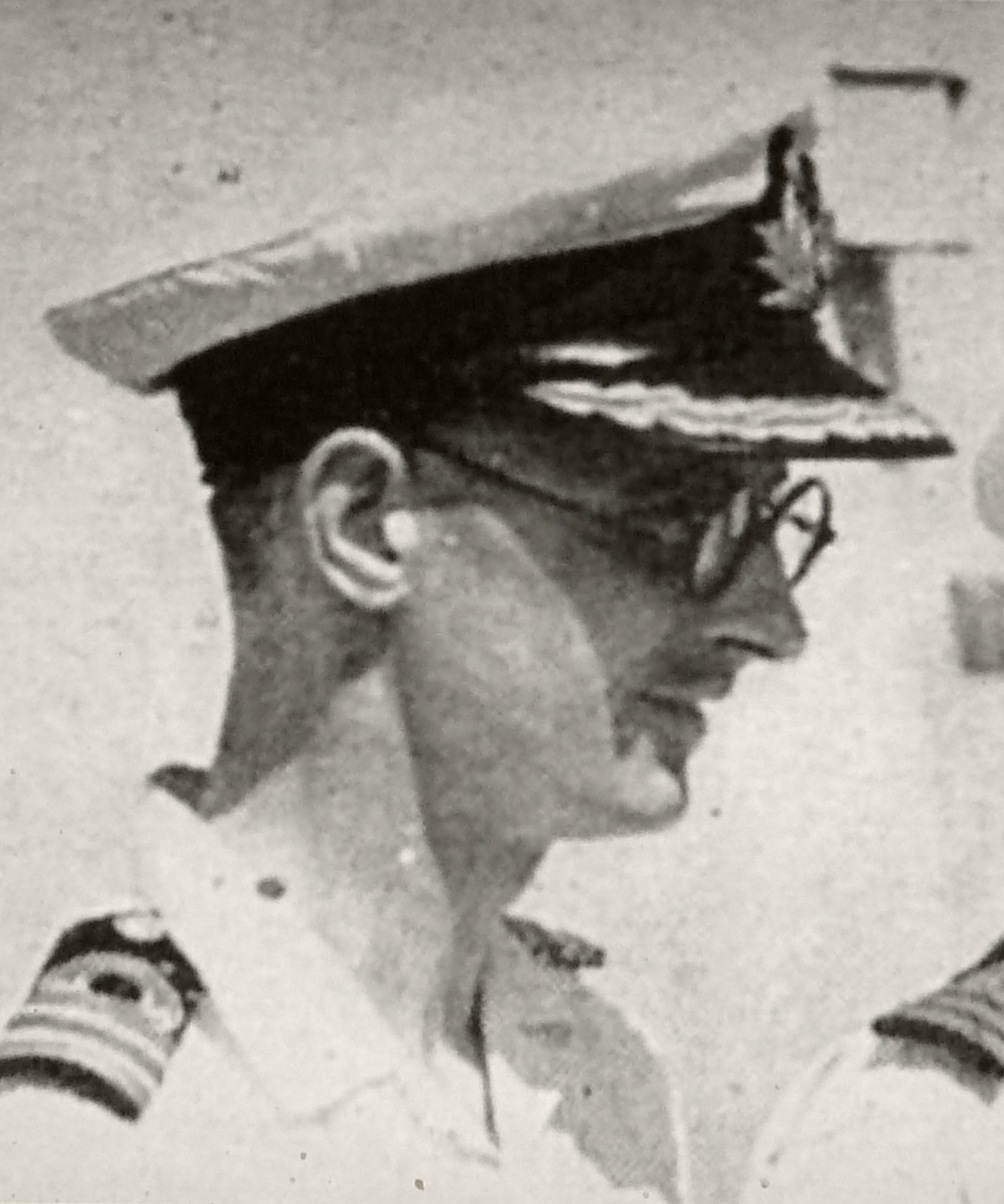
- Covey-Crump in 1944
- Born: Alwyn Thomas Lavender Covey-Crump; 19 February 1907; Stopsley, Bedfordshire, England
- Died: 19 May 1991 (aged 84); St Albans, England
- Spouse: Joyce Blackstone (married 1938-91)
- Children: 1 son
- Relatives: Walter William Covey-Crump
- Military career
- Branch: Royal Navy
- Rank: Naval Assistant to the Chief of Naval Information, Commander
- Other work: Alphabetical Glossary of Naval Terms and Abbreviations (1955), a record of naval slang

Commander Alwyn Thomas Lavender Covey-Crump (19 February 1907 – 19 May 1991) was a British officer of the Royal Navy. An assistant to the Chief of Naval Information, he was responsible in the mid-1950s for compiling a record of Jack-speak (naval slang) and other historical marine linguistic details. The first edition appeared on 17 May 1955. The compilation, now continually updated, has led to the term Covey-Crump itself entering into Royal Navy slang.

Covey-Crump served in various ships between 1927 and 1945, including HMS Vindictive, HMS Enterprise, HMS Duncan, HMS Faulkner, HMS Boscawen, HMS Ceylon and HMS Liverpool. He was the second son of Reverend Canon Walter William Covey-Crump, and was married with one son.

== Background ==
Covey-Crump was born on 19 February 1907 in Stopsley, Bedfordshire. (Note: GRO index: Births Mar 1907 Covey-Crump Alwyn Thomas Luton 3b 373.) He was the second son of Reverend Canon Walter William Covey-Crump; (Note: Walter William Covey-Crump (1865–1949)) his mother was Hilda Sophia (née Porter). (Note: Hilda Sophia née Porter (1879–1968).GRO index: Births Sep 1879 Porter Hilda Sophia Ely (which includes Haddenham) 3b 539. Deaths Jun 1968 Covey-Crump Hilda S. 88 Ely 4A 306.) His parents married on 11 June 1903 at Haddenham, (Note: GRO index: Marriages Jun 1903 Crump Walter William C. and Porter Hilda Sophia, Ely 3b 1213) when his father was by then using the name Covey as a given name. The family was using the double-barrelled name, Covey-Crump, by 1911.

Covey-Crump had two brothers: musician Lewis Charles Leslie, (Note: Lewis Charles Leslie (1904–1962). GRO index: Births Jun 1904 Covey-Crump Lewis C. L. Luton 3b 395. Deaths Sep 1962 Covey-Crump Lewis C.L. 58 Marylebone 5d 253.) and Leo William Rolf, (Note: Leo William Rolf (1910–2001). GRO index: Births Jun 1910 Covey-Crump Leo William R. Luton 3b 364.) who served in the Royal Naval Volunteer Reserve in World War II. He attended King's Ely.

In 1938, Covey-Crump married Joyce Blackstone (Note: Joyce Blackstone (4 May 1904 – Watford December 1991). GRO index: Deaths 1991 Covey-Crump Joyce Elizabeth 04 MY 1904 Watford 12.91 10 0775) at St James, Picadilly, London. (Note: GRO index: Marriages Jun 1938 Covey-Crump Alwyn T.L., and Blackstone Joyce, Westminster 1a 1236) the daughter of T. W. Blackstone, former Deputy Inspector General of Police and Police Commissioner in Southern India. The 1939 England and Wales Register finds him at Flat 5, Nirvana Mansions, Portsmouth. The 1957 Electoral Register finds Covey-Crump and his wife Joyce living at 19 Trenham Drive, Warlingham, Surrey. They had one son. (Note: GRO index: Marriages Sep 1961 Covey-Crump David J. Wife was Thompson. Father was A.T.L. Covey-Crump. Place of marriage was Sidcup. 5b 1819) He died aged 84 on 19 May 1991 at St Albans, (Note: GRO index: Deaths 1991 Covey-Crump Alwyn Thomas L 19 Fe 1907 St Albans May 1991 10 562. Probate 1991.) and was buried on 24 May.

== Naval service ==
=== Inter-war years ===
On 1 September 1925, aged 18, Covey-Crump was appointed acting paymaster sub-lieutenant or paymaster midshipman. In December 1927 he passed his accountant officers' examination, class 2, while serving on HMS Vindictive. On 1 June 1929 he was promoted to paymaster lieutenant. In 1931 he was deployed to HMS Enterprise. From 14 September 1934 he was deployed to HMS Vernon, a shore establishment in Portsmouth. He was appointed to HMS Duncan from 10 September 1935. From 28 September 1936 he was deployed as secretary to Captain Victor Danckwerts of HMS Faulkner, leader of the 6th Destroyer Flotilla. From 1 June 1937 he was paymaster lieutenant-commander. On 16 August 1938 he was sent to HMS Victory shore establishment for an accountant officers' technical course. On 2 January 1939 he was again deployed to HMS Victory for Tactical School.

=== Second World War ===
On 11 August 1939, Covey-Crump was appointed to the shore establishment HMS Boscawen. In that year, he was assistant to the Chief of Naval Information. He was promoted to commander on 1 June 1943. In 1944, he was serving on the cruiser HMS Ceylon.

=== After the war ===
In 1946, Covey-Crump was serving at HMS St George shore training establishment, finishing in January 1948. In February 1948, he was appointed to HMS St Vincent, a shore training establishment. He was appointed to HMS Liverpool from 15 March 1948 until at least August 1950. On 22 January 1950, while Covey-Crump was serving in the Mediterranean under Vice Admiral Louis Mountbatten on HMS Liverpool, King Farouk visited the ship, and was presented with a special matchbox when lighting his cigar. "From the ship's Father Christmas one of the officers, Commander A. T. L. Covey-Crump, had received the present of six boxes of matches. The specially-printed label bears the legend Commander Covey's Crumptious Matches beneath a horseshoe". Farouk was a collector and belonged to the British Matchbox Labels Society (BMLS); the gift was described as a "great rarity". The president of the BMLS also owned one of the six labels.

In 1955, Covey-Crump's compilation of Jack-speak was published within the Navy. He was appointed registrar at the Royal Naval Barracks, Devonport the same year.

== Compilation of naval terms ==
=== Alphabetical Glossary of Naval Terms and Abbreviations (1955) ===
Covey-Crump privately published, within the Royal Navy, his first-edition typescript of Alphabetical Glossary of Naval Terms and Abbreviations on 17 May 1955. It contains "a collection of Naval slang, abbreviations, legends and historical tit-bits", and a list of Naval nicknames. The National Archives website has an online transcription of it, commenting that it "provides a valuable resource for researchers looking for answers to many historical questions about the Royal Navy". The historical reenactment company HMS Richmond suggests that the collection of Jack-speak in this compilation is centred on the period around 1775. It is "mainly aimed at those with a background in the senior service", and was "the first official collection of naval slang". The compilation itself became known in the Royal Navy as Covey-Crump and the phrase thus entered the list of naval slang. One example from the compilation is: "Blazer: The name for this coloured coat comes from HMS Blazer, whose Captain (Captain J. W. Washington) in 1845 had his boat's crew dressed in blue and white-striped jackets. This was, of course, before the days of authorised uniform for Naval ratings".

=== Reviews ===
- "So richly endowed is our language with the patois of the sea that it is surprising that so few glossaries of nautical terms and their origins have found their way into print. One excellent example that never got that far is the one compiled by Cdr. A. T. L. Covey-Crump for the Chief of Naval Information in the 1950s – Navy News still has its own well-thumbed copy of the type-script". [It has an] "idiosyncratic appeal".

=== Updated and modern versions of the Alphabetical Glossary ===
Jackspeak continues to evolve: Covey-Crump's 1955 edition marks a moment in time, and there was an updated edition in 1967. Surgeon Captain Rick Jolly, who as a surgeon commander with the Commando Logistic Regiment commanded the field hospital at Ajax Bay during the Falklands War produced his own dictionary of "Jackspeak" in aid of the South Atlantic Medal Association, in 2000.

== Collections ==
- Imperial War Museum: Covey-Crump, A. T. L. (1967). The new Covey-Crump an alphabetical glossary of naval terms and abbreviations (MOD ref: LBY 03 / 2268). London: Ministry of Defence (UK).
