= Everyman Theatre, Baltimore =

Regional theatre in Baltimore, Maryland, US

Everyman Theatre
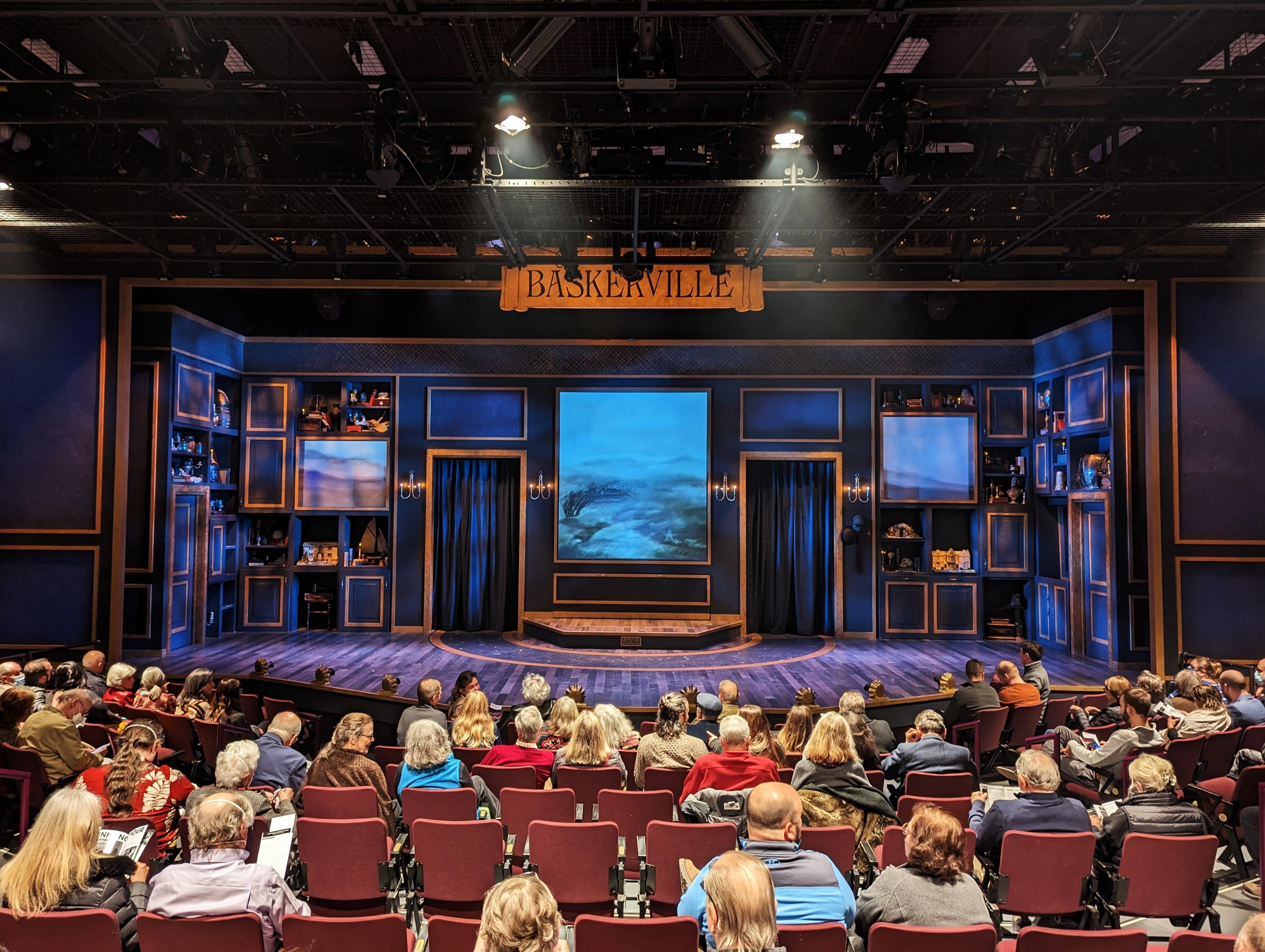
- The Everyman Theatre auditorium ahead of a performance of Baskerville: A Sherlock Holmes Mystery.
- Formation: 1990
- Type: Theatre group
- Location: 315 W. Fayette Street, Baltimore, MD.
- Artistic director: Vincent M. Lancisi
- Website: everymantheatre.org

Everyman Theatre is a regional theatre with a professional repertory company of artists in downtown Baltimore, Maryland. Everyman's mission is to bring accessible and affordable theatre to the city of Baltimore. Everyman Theatre is located in downtown Baltimore in the Bromo Arts and Entertainment District.

== History ==
Founded in 1990 by artistic director Vincent M. Lancisi, Everyman's debut production was The Runner Stumbles in Saint John's Church in Baltimore. For the next few years, Everyman only produced one production per season at various locations throughout the city. In 1995 Everyman finally had their own home in a former bowling alley on Charles Street, and offered yearly subscriptions for the first time. Everyman's first production in their own space was Buried Child by Sam Shepard.

In November 2006, Everyman Theatre made the official announcement that it had received a gift of a new home by the Bank of America and The Dawson Company: The Town Theatre, located at 315 West Fayette Street on the West Side of Baltimore City. Everyman's new home opened as The Empire in 1910 with vaudeville performances and later hosted Yiddish theatre, boxing, and bingo parties. The original building was designed by Otto Simonson, a local architect, with William H. McElfatrick. In 1937, during its life as The Palace—a burlesque theatre—there was public uproar over the "indecency" of the performances and the theatre was closed. Shortly thereafter, and as if to ensure the death of its racy past, the theatre was converted to a parking garage. In 1947, the building was redesigned into a 1,550-seat movie house by Baltimore architect John Zink, one of the major East Coast theatre architects of the mid-twentieth century. The Town Theatre, as it was known during this period, had a glittering opening with the now-classic film “It’s a Wonderful Life, “ which was attended by star Jimmy Stewart and director Frank Capra. By 1990, The Town was in disrepair, closing its doors and remaining a vacant shadow of its former self until it was donated by the Bank of America and The Harold A. Dawson Trust to Everyman Theatre in 2006. Along with the recently restored Hippodrome Theatre and the Bromo Seltzer Arts Tower, the creation of Everyman's new home plays an important role in the renaissance of a theatre and arts district in downtown Baltimore's Westside. The restoration of the neoclassical terra cotta and granite façade represents the most historically significant aspect of the renovation. The building, valued at $1.5 million, was renovated to offer sufficient scene shops, costume and props facilities, education space, and a 253-seat state of the art theatre with more room to grow in future years. In January 2013, Everyman celebrated the grand opening of their new theatre with a production of Tracy Letts's August: Osage County.

== See also ==
- Theater in Maryland
