= Overlord Museum =

World War II museum in Normandy, France

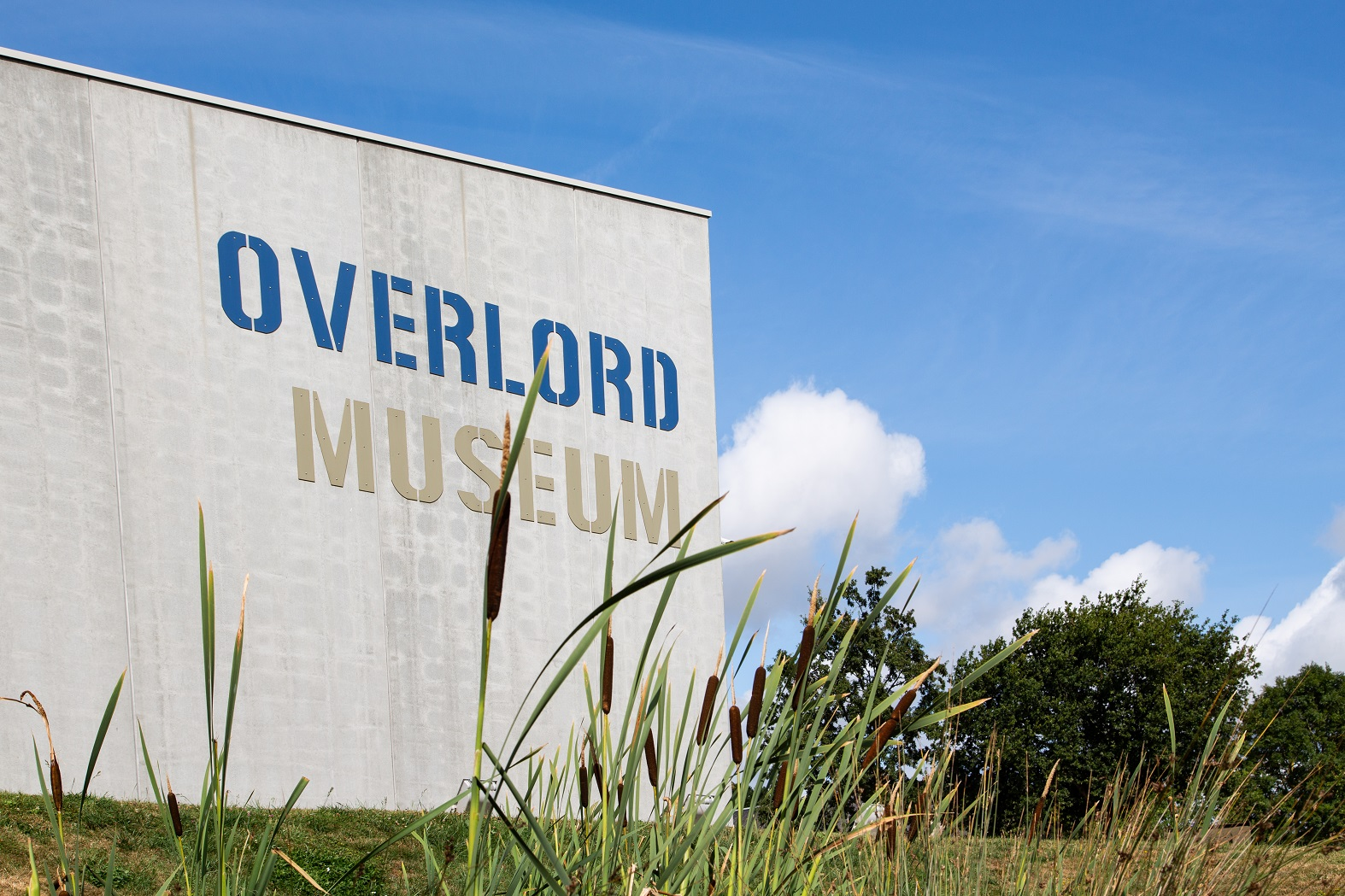
- Building of the Overlord Museum
- Location: Colleville-sur-Mer, France
- Coordinates: 49°20′52″N 0°51′23″W
- Type: Military history
- Website: www.overlordmuseum.com

The Overlord Museum is a museum which focuses on the Allied landings in Normandy with Operation Overlord and the subsequent development of the Second World War. It is located in Colleville-sur-Mer in the Calvados department of the Normandy region in northern France. The museum is located near the Omaha Beach Landing Section and the American War Cemetery, known as the World War II Normandy American Cemetery and Memorial.

== Museum concept and contents of the exhibition ==
The museum exhibits objects inside and outside the museum. The arrangement in the interior is in the style of large dioramas, which allow objects to be shown in contemporary real environments. Vehicles, objects, and life-size dolls were assembled into scenes with this in mind. In the outdoor area, ready-to-drive vehicles are shown in operation at events. Only a small number of objects are visible outside all year round.

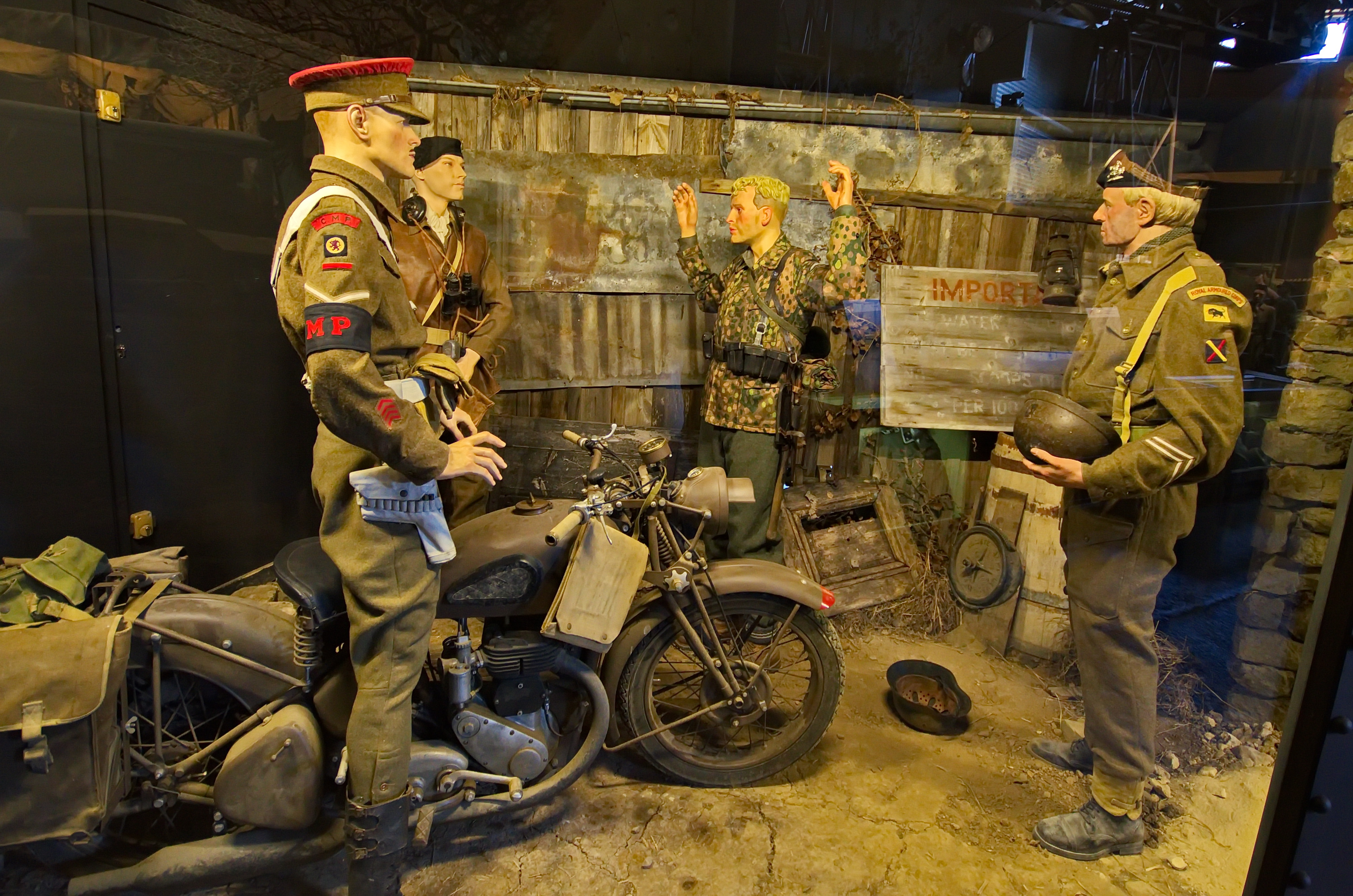
Capture of POW-prisoners

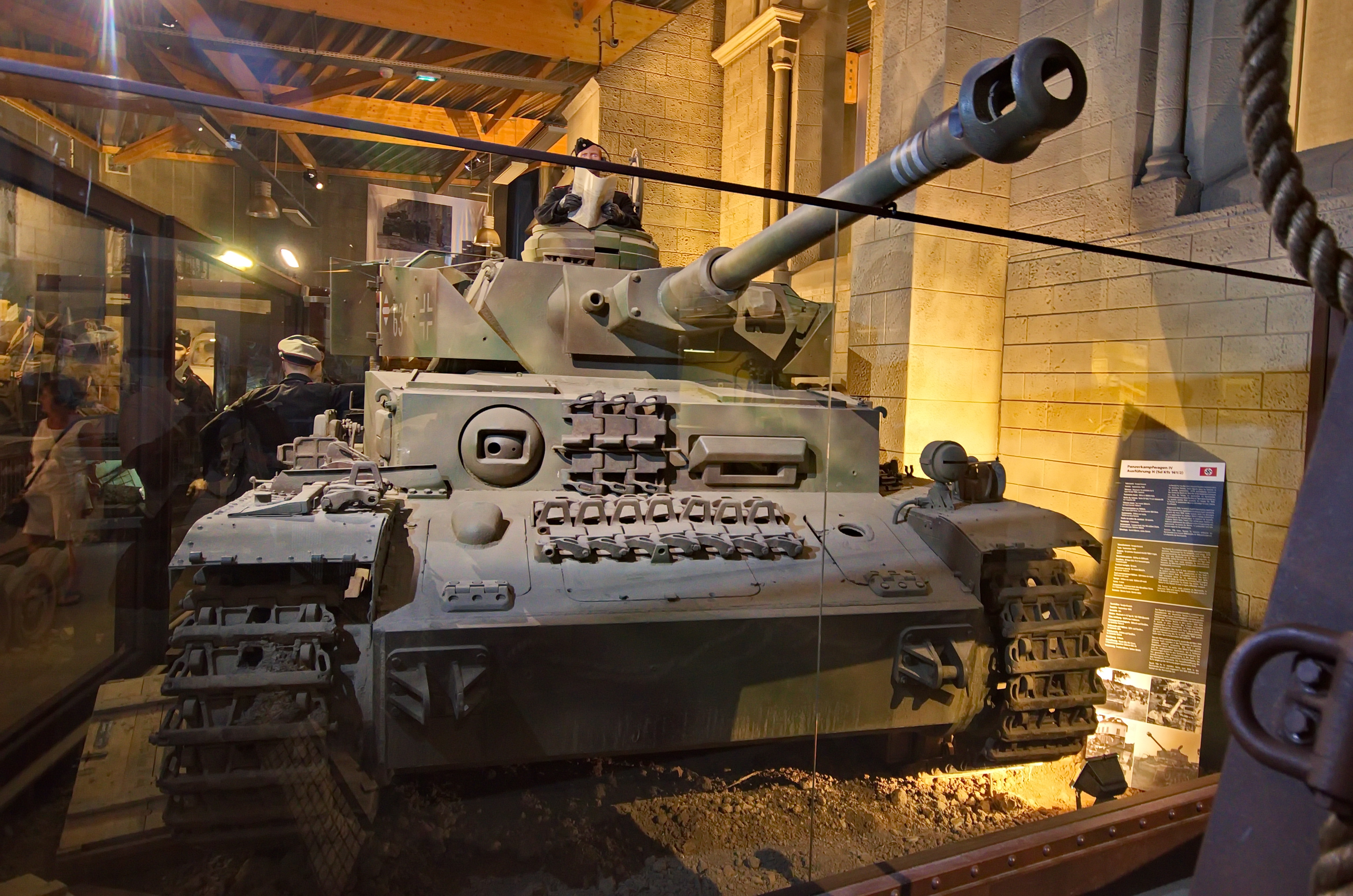
Panzer IV

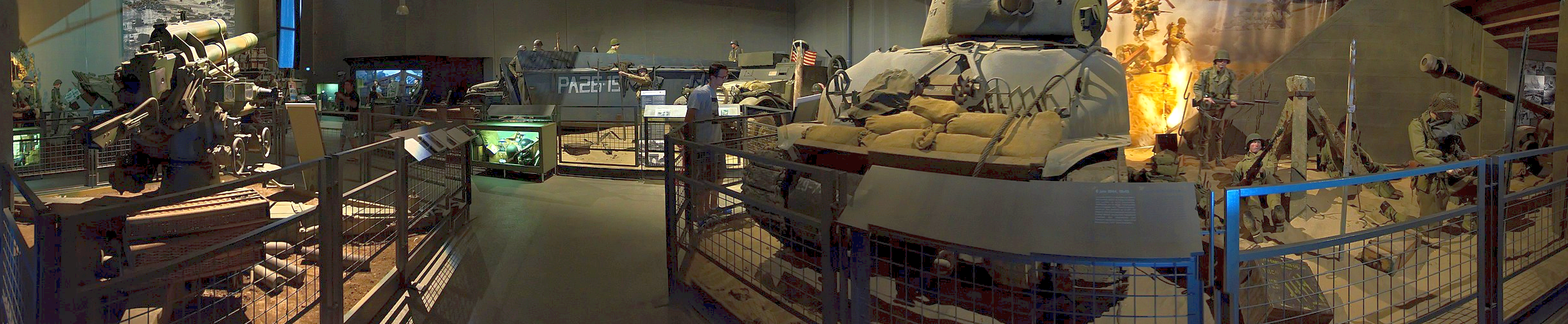
Panorama in the Overlord Museum

== Literature ==
- Jaeger, Stephan (2020), The Second World War in the Twenty-First-Century Museum, From Narrative, Memory, and Experience to Experientiality, Boston, Berlin: De Gruyter, ISBN 978-3-11-066133-0
- Veronico, Nicholas A. (2019), D-Day, the air and sea invasion of Normandy in photos, Guilford, Connecticut: Stackpole Books, ISBN 978-0-8117-6813-9
