= List of theaters in Maryland =

This page is a list of theatres in the US state of Maryland.

== Professional theatres ==
- Adventure Theatre
- Baltimore Theatre Project
- Centerstage
- Chesapeake Shakespeare Company
- Columbia Center for Theatrical Arts
- Cumberland Theatre
- Everyman Theatre
- Hippodrome Theatre
- Imagination Stage
- Maryland Ensemble Theatre
- Maryland Shakespeare Festival
- Olney Theatre Center
- Performance Workshop Theatre
- Perisphere Theater
- Red Branch Theatre Company
- Rep Stage
- Round House Theatre
- Single Carrot Theatre
- Toby's Dinner Theatre
- Way Off Broadway Dinner Theatre

== Fringe theatres ==
- Baltimore Rock Opera Society
- Baltimore Shakespeare Factory
- Iron Crow Theatre
- The Rude Mechanicals
- The Strand Theater
- Submersive Productions
- Venus Theatre

== Community theatres ==
- Annapolis Summer Garden Theatre
- The Arena Players
- Artistic Synergy of Baltimore
- Bowie Playhouse
- The Colonial Players of Annapolis
- Community Players of Salisbury
- Dundalk Community Theater
- Fells Point Corner Theatre
- Hard Bargain Players
- Laurel Mill Playhouse
- Liberty Showcase Theater
- Milburn Stone Theatre
- Mobtown Players
- New Direction Community Theater
- The Newtowne Players
- Patuxent Playhouse
- Port Tobacco Players
- Potomac Playmakers
- Rockville Little Theater
- September Song Musical Theatre
- Silhouette Stages
- Silver Spring Stage
- Spotlighters Theatre
- Tantallon Players, Fort Washington
- Theatre on The Hill
- Twin Beaches Players, Chesapeake Beach
- Vagabond Players
- Winters Lane Productions
- Ovations Theatre

== Children's theatre & youth theatres ==
- Adventure Theatre
- Children's Playhouse of Maryland
- Children's Theater Association
- Drama Learning Center
- Imagination Stage
- Pumpkin Theatre
- The Sky Is The Limit Productions
- Children's Theatre of Annapolis
- Talent Machine

== Collegiate educational theatre ==
- University of Maryland College Park
- University of Maryland Baltimore County
- Bowie State University
- Loyola College
- Salisbury University
- Towson University
- Goucher College
- St. Mary's College
- Frostburg State University
- Maryland Institute College of Art
- Morgan State University (Theatre Morgan)

== Awards ==
- Helen Hayes Awards
- Greater Baltimore Theater Awards
