= Mobtown Players =

The Mobtown Players is a theater company based in Baltimore, Maryland. It has its roots in Johns Hopkins University (JHU). Its first production was in 1998, and it founded its first permanent theater in 2003.

== History ==
While attending JHU during the early nineties, which at the time had no real theatre program, Ryan Whinnem, Noel Schively, Bill Henry, and Ruth Scrandis Henry were all participants in the Hopkins student theatre group, The Barnstormers. Whinnem was so anxious to do Shakespeare that he had gone as far as to start his own splinter group, the Hopkins Classic Players. They performed Romeo and Juliet in a breezeway on campus with a $100 budget. Whinnem figures $50 went for snacks.

After graduation the four went their separate ways. Following residencies in Los Angeles and Boston, Whinnem returned to Baltimore in the summer of 1997, he contacted the other three. Within days the four decided to form their own theatre company.

Their first production, Hamlet, opened in the fall of 1998. Imaginatively staged at the historic St. John's Church in Baltimore, the production won the new group attention from both the press and other local theatres. The following spring the Company produced Mimi Teahan's Urban Breakdowns for the Baltimore Playwrights Festival and won the Festival's Third Place Production award.

For the next several years, Mobtown produced classics, including A Comedy of Errors and Merchant of Venice while continuing to annually participating in the BPF. Without a central theatre to work in, the company floated from one location to another.

In the spring of 2002, Mobtown went to the heart of Baltimore when it staged A Midsummer Night’s Dream outdoors in Patterson Park. The park provided a natural amphitheatre that matched Mobtown's ambition. The appearance of live theatre in such an urban outdoor setting brought the Company attention from every corner of Baltimore. Since its first show, they have returned to Patterson Park often, staging classic William Shakespeare productions, including Julius Caesar, Romeo and Juliet, and Twelfth Night.

=== Mobtown Theater ===
In the fall of 2003, Mobtown found a home when they took over a vacated theatre at Meadow Mill. Located in Baltimore's classic Hampden Neighborhood, the permanent space meant that for the first time Mobtown could create a permanent season. The 70 seat venue was the home for Mobtown's mix of classical and new work. They opened with a new translation of Molière's The Misanthrope.

The new theatre features a large lobby, which allows the theatre to offer plenty space for an after-show beverage, three rehearsal spaces, a large backstage area for set construction and two large offices. When they opened in their new space, Mobtown also formed a partnership with other Baltimore theatre companies looking for production space. Run of the Mill, Company 13, The Unmentionable Theatre Company, the Living Room Theater Company, and several others have all used the Mobtown Theater.

In 2004, Mobtown saw one of their biggest successes with their presentation of the Obie winning musical Hedwig and the Angry Inch. The show played to sold-out crowds in November and then did the same when Mobtown was able to bring the show back for a return engagement in January 2005. The production was named to the Baltimore City Paper’s Best of Stage 2004 and the Greater Baltimore Theater Awards Best Experimental Production for 2004. The play’s director, Terry Long, was named Director of the Year by the same organization. Also winning awards from GBTA were Jordan Seibert as Best Actor and the production’s design team of Tony Gallahan and Ed Zarkowski for Outstanding Design.

After years of struggle and knocking on the door of success, Mobtown was finally stable and achieving their goals when they faced their first major crisis. In 2006, artistic director and founding member Ryan Whinnem was accepted as a director in the Masters Program of Theatre at the Catholic University of America in Washington, D.C.

=== New Era ===
After a long search of replacement candidates for the position of Artistic Director, the Company hired Alex Willis, who is also a graduate of the Johns Hopkins University. Wills had been a Board Member of Fells Point Corner Theatre for over ten years. She had also made a name for herself by directing dozens of productions for various theatre, including Mobtown, Fells Point Theatre and Vagabonds. Over the years, four of her previous productions have been named to the City Paper’s year-end Top Ten Theatrical Productions List, and the Greater Baltimore Theatre Awards named her 2005 production of Henry Miller’s The Turn of the Screw as one of the Outstanding Productions of the year.

Willis’ first season as artistic director started strongly with her direction of Edward Albee's The Goat, or Who Is Sylvia? This challenging play won a 2006 year-end Outstanding Production Award from Broadway World. They also named Willis as Outstanding Director Award for the same show. They also presented actress Tiffany James with an Outstanding Supporting Actress Award for her work in the Willis-directed Inventing Van Gogh.

Mobtown has made a habit of producing seasons with a wide variety of thematic content. In direct contrast to the serious tones of the Baltimore Premier of Pulitzer Prize-winning playwright Nilo Cruz's A Bicycle Country or Inventing Van Gogh or The Goat, or Who Is Sylvia?, the same seasons have also seen Mobtown present Ben Jonson's romp Volpone, a wild burlesque/vaudeville show, Skin (directed by Bradley Burgess), and Carlo Goldoni's Servant of Two Masters.

President Karen Moul oversees a staff that includes Tony Gallahan as vice president and Ana Pavich as Treasurer. 2007 saw founding member Noel Schively directing Bob Alleman and Matt Sekerke's new translation of Carlo Goldoni's Servant of Two Masters to positive reviews and full houses. 2008 brought one of Baltimore's "Movers and Shakers," actress and director Erin Riley to the Mobtown stage for one of the most successful shows in recent Baltimore history "Six Dead Queens...and an Inflatable Henry."

=== Baltimore Playwright's Festival ===
Through the years Mobtown has continued to participate in and support the Baltimore Playwright's Festival. The BPF will often use Mobtown's theatre for staged readings of plays under consideration in the Festival. In addition, the BPF will often hold their annual auditions in the same space.

Like all participating members of the BPF, Mobtown is responsible for choosing the shows they produce during the summer festival. Over the past ten years Mobtown productions have continued to win awards from the Festival's judges. In 2006, during the twenty-fifth anniversary of the BPF, Mobtown offered a double bill of two one-acts focusing on the family, Return of the 5th Sister by Kimberley Lynne and Sod by Mark Squirek. Both were directed by Whinnem. Lynn's play received second place as Best Play and Third Place for Production while Squirek was named Outstanding Baltimore Playwright for 2006 by Broadway World.
