= Single Carrot Theatre =

Theater company

Single Carrot Theatre was an ensemble theatre company in Baltimore, Maryland, in the United States. The Company was founded in 2005 by students from the University of Colorado at Boulder. The company selected Baltimore, MD as the city to locate their theatre after a nationwide city search.

Its mission statement emphasized "new, diverse and socially significant works" and the company's support for "the growth of young artists."

It closed on January 27, 2023 after 15 seasons and 60 shows.

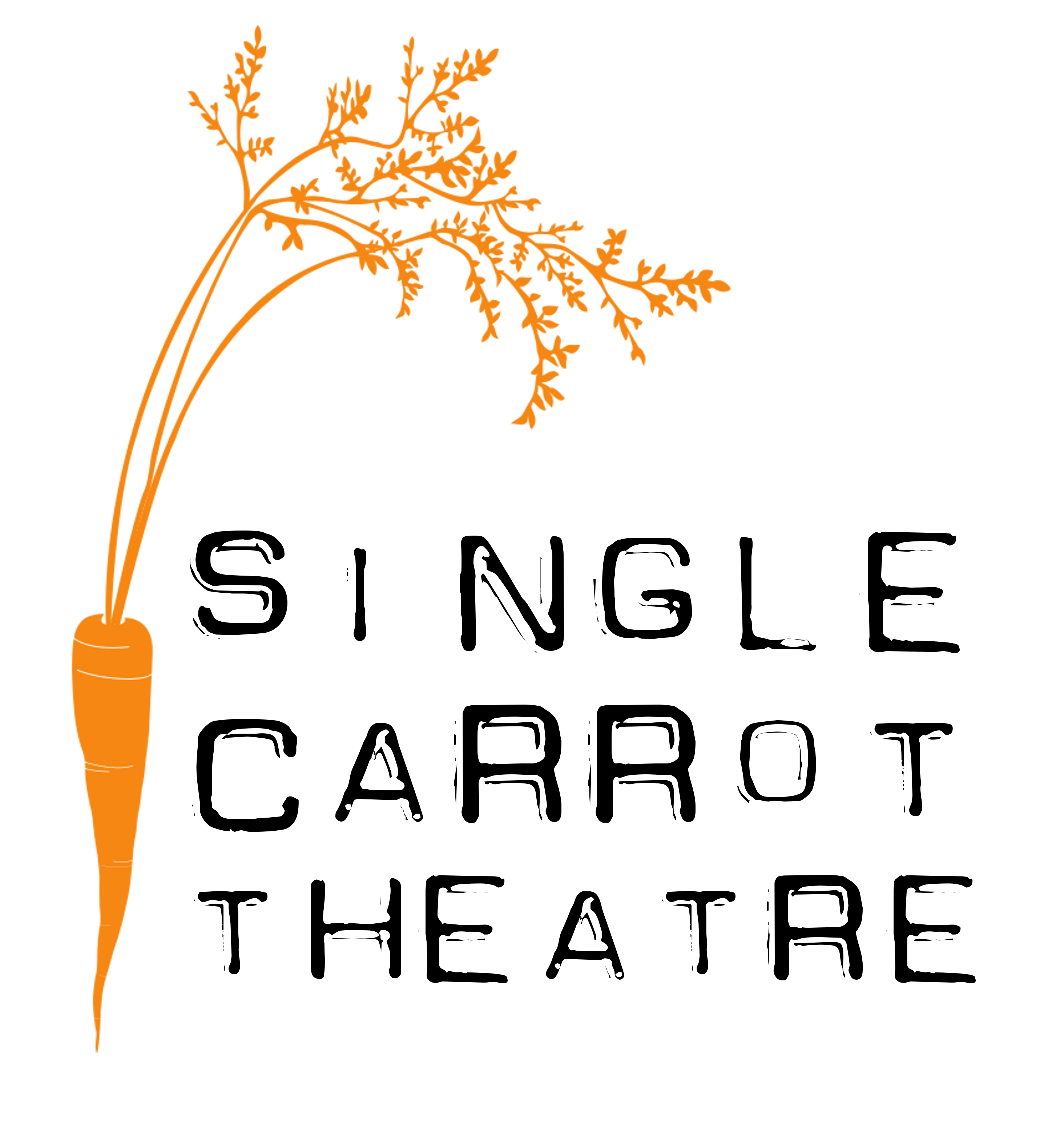

== Production history ==
=== Season 1: 2007/2008 ===
Red Light Winter by Adam Rapp, Directed by J. Buck Jabaily; August 8 – 19, 2007

The Baltimore Waltz by Paula Vogel, Directed by Genevieve de Mahy; October 17 – November 4

La Muñeca by Aldo Pantoja, Directed by Brendan Ragan; December 13–22

Sects and Violins by Single Carrot Theatre, Directed by Jessica Garett; March 13–29

Richard III (play) by William Shakespeare, Directed by J. Buck Jabaily; July 17 - August 3

=== Other Projects for Season 1 2007/2008 ===
First Annual Murder Ink reading by Anna Ditkoff, Directed by J. Buck Jabaily

Artscape ’07 Performance: Legalize Gay Marriage – A 24 Hour Play by Single Carrot Theatre, Directed by Genevieve de Mahy; July 21, 2007

=== Season 2: 2008/2009 ===
Food For Fish by Adam Szymkowicz, Directed by Genevieve de Mahy; October 9 – 26

Crave by Sarah Kane, Directed by J. Buck Jabaily; December 4 – 21

Killer Joe by Tracy Letts, Directed by Giti Jabaily; February 19 – March 15

The Wild Duck by Henrik Ibsen, Directed by J. Buck Jabaily; April 20 - May 24

Slampooned! by Single Carrot Theatre, Directed by Aldo Pantoja; July 9 - August 2

=== Other Projects for Season 2 2008/2009 ===
Second Annual Murder Ink reading by Anna Ditkoff, Directed by Jessica Garrett

=== Season 3: 2009/2010 ===
Eurydice by Sarah Ruhl, Directed by J. Buck Jabaily; September 23 – October 18

Illuminoctem by Single Carrot Theatre, Directed by Brendan Ragan; November 25 - December 20

Playing Dead by The Presynakov Brothers, Directed by Yury Urnov; February 17 – March 14

Crumble (Lay Me Down, Justin Timeberlake) by Sheila Callaghan, Directed by Aldo Pantoja; April 28 – May 23

Tragedy: a tragedy by Will Eno, Directed by J. Buck Jabaily; June 16 – July 11

=== Other Projects for Season 3 2009/2010 ===
Poe Project by Genevieve de Mahy, Directed by Nathan Cooper; October 29 – November 1

Third Annual Murder Ink reading by Anna Ditkoff, Directed by J. Buck Jabaily

BMA Gallery Project: If This Art Could Talk by Jessica Garrett, Directed by Jessica Garrett

=== Season 4: 2010/2011 ===
Natural Selection by Eric Coble, Directed by Nathan Fulton; September 29 – October 31

The Other Shore by Gao Xingjian, Directed by J. Buck Jabaily; December 8 – January 16

The Long Christmas Ride Home by Paula Vogel, Directed by Jessica Garrett; March 16 – April 17

Linus & Alora by Andrew Irons, Directed by Genevieve de Mahy; June 8 – July 10

=== Other Projects for Season 4 2010/2011 ===
BMA Performance: Three Andys by Rich Espey, Directed by Genevieve de Mahy

Fourth Annual Murder Ink reading by Anna Ditkoff, Directed by J. Buck Jabaily

Rumpled by The Single Carrot Theatre Assembly Program, Directed by J. Buck Jabaily

=== Season 5: 2011/2012 ===
Church by Young Jean Lee, Directed by Nathan Fulton; September 28 – October 30, 2011

MilkMilkLemonade by Joshua Conkel, Directed by Nathan Cooper; January 4 – February 5, 2012

Hotel Cassiopeia by Charles Mee, Directed by Genevieve de Mahy; March 28 – April 29, 2012

Foot of Water by Single Carrot Theatre, Directed by Ben Hoover; June 6 – July 8, 2012

=== Season 6: 2012/2013 ===
Drunk Enough To Say I Love You? by Caryl Churchill, Directed by Ben Hoover;

"Tropic of X" by Caridad Svich, Directed by Nathan Cooper

"The V.I.P." by Aldo Pantoja, Directed by Aldo Pantoja

"A Sorcerer's Journey" by Alix Fenhagen, Directed by Nathan Fulton

=== Season 7: 2013/2014 ===
"A Beginner's Guide To Deicide" by Qui Nguyen and Robert Ross, Directed by Elliott Rauh

"Worst Case Scenario" by Jessica Garrett (Head Writer), Directed by Jessica Garrett

"The Flu Season" by Will Eno, Directed by Alix Fenhagen

"The Memo" by Václav Havel, Directed by Stephen Nunns

"The Apocalypse Comes at 6pm" by Georgi Gospodinov, Directed by Genevieve de Mahy

=== Season 8: 2014/2015 ===
"Social Creatures" by Jackie Sibblies Drury, Directed by Kellie Mecleary

"References To Salvador Dali Make Me Hot" by José Rivera, Directed by Steve Satta

"Utopia Parkway" by Charles Mee, Directed by Genevieve de Mahy

"Blind From Here" by Alix Fenhagen, Directed by Stephen Nunns
