= The Baltimore Shakespeare Festival =

The Baltimore Shakespeare Festival was a small nonprofit theatre that produced plays by or about Shakespeare in Baltimore, Maryland. It also had an educational program that introduced school children to Shakespeare. The company existed, in different forms, from 1994 to 2010.

== History ==
The first production of BSF was A Midsummer Night's Dream which was performed at The Cloisters in Lutherville, Maryland in 1994. The company was founded by Kelley Dunn-Feliz and Richard Feliz that same year. In its early years, the Festival often faced financial instability, scaled back on its productions and went through several management changes.

In 2003, the festival moved to a permanent indoor space within the St Mary's Community Center in the Hampden neighborhood of North Baltimore.

The Baltimore Shakespeare Festival closed its doors for good in 2011. The Board of Trustees made a simple public pronouncement of the difficulty of producing live theater and announced it was closing its doors due to economic challenges. The company did not maintain any archives.

== Production history ==
=== 1994 ===
- A Midsummer Night's Dream

=== 1995 ===
- Romeo and Juliet

=== 1997 ===
- Macbeth

=== 1998 ===
- Twelfth Night

=== 2000 ===
- Love for Words by Kimberley Lynne - Directed by Tony Tsendeas
- I Hate Hamlet - Directed by Joseph Brady

=== 2001 ===
- Much Ado About Nothing - Directed by Laura Hackman

=== 2002-03 ===
- Cyrano de Bergerac - Directed by Joseph Brady
- Hamlet - Directed by Laura Hackman

=== 2003-04 ===
- As You Like It - Directed by Laura Hackman
- Othello - Directed by Tony Tsendeas
- Dickens of a Carol - Directed by Kathy Feininger
  - Teen Performance Program: Macbeth - Directed by Tony Tsendeas

=== 2004-05 ===
- The Tempest - Directed by Laura Hackman
- Julius Caesar - Directed by Tony Tsendeas
- Dickens of a Carol - Directed by Kathy Feininger
  - Teen Performance Program: Love's Labour's Lost - Directed by Lewis Shaw

=== 2005-06 ===
- The Merry Wives of Windsor - Directed by Drew Kahl
- Romeo and Juliet - Directed by Pat Diamond
- Something Dickens This Way Comes - Directed and written by Kathy Feininger
  - Teen Performance Program: Hamlet - Directed by Tony Tsendeas
  - Rosencrantz and Guildenstern Are Dead - Directed by James Kinstle

=== 2006-07 ===
- A Midsummer Night's Dream - Directed by Laura Hackman
- The Complete Works of William Shakespeare, Abridged - Directed by Tony Tsendeas
- Desdemona, a Play About a Handkerchief by Paula Vogel - Directed by Raine Bode
  - Teen Performance Program: Much Ado About Nothing - Directed by Joan Weber
  - All's Well That Ends Well - Directed by Donald Hicken

=== 2007-08 ===
- Macbeth - Directed by Tony Tsendeas
- Antigone by Bertolt Brecht - Directed by Raine Bode
  - Teen Performance Program: The Comedy of Errors - Directed by Ian Belker
  - A Winter's Tale - Directed by Kathleen Akerley

=== 2008-09 ===
- Twelfth Night - Directed by Laura Hackman
- The Taming of the Shrew - Directed by Joseph Brady
- Every Christmas Story Ever Told! - Directed and written by Michael Carleton
  - Teen Performance Program: The Tempest - Directed by Courtney Weber
  - Wittenberg - Directed by Tony Tsendeas

=== 2009-10 ===
- Hamlet - Adapted and directed by Michael Carleton
- Richard III - Directed by Michael Carleton
- "Comedy of Errors" Directed by Joe Brady
- "Scapin" Directed by Michael Carleton
