= Slaughter City =

1996 play by Naomi Wallace

- Original language: English
- Written by: Naomi Wallace
- Genre: Drama
- Setting: A slaughterhouse in the United States

Premiere
- Date: January 17, 1996
- Place: The Pit, London, England
- Directed by: Ron Daniels

Slaughter City is a 1996 play by American playwright Naomi Wallace. It premiered at the Royal Shakespeare Company's Pit in London, England. It tells the story of the otherworldly Cod's employment at a slaughterhouse.

The play was inspired by a number of labor-related incidents including the Triangle Shirtwaist Factory fire of 1911 and the 1993 strike at the Fischer's meat packing plant in Louisville, Kentucky.

== Plot ==
The drama follows the lives of a group of workers who work at a modern day plant. While work gets tougher and more dangerous, their wages are being cut, and benefits reduced. Into the fray walks Cod, a strange young man who tries to inspire them to action. But Cod has his own secrets, which include once being a scab, and is in a long term battle with the cool Sausage Man, a battle whose outcome will affect them all in deadly ways.

The play is divided into two acts and moves back and forth (and sometimes seemingly sideways) through time. Love, desire and friendship between these workers is disrupted, and transformed by the political pressures swirling around them. And the boss is beginning to make strange noises, just when his assistant has had enough.

The live stage performance rights are licensed by Broadway Play Publishing Inc.

== Production history ==
Slaughter City premiered at the Royal Shakespeare Company's Pit in the Barbican Centre in London, England on January 17, 1996. It was directed by Ron Daniels. The production transferred to American Repertory Theater in Boston, with Daniels directing an American cast. Opening in Boston on March 28, 1996, it ran for a month at the Hasty Pudding Theater, in repertory with Susan Sontag's Alice in Bed performed by the same cast.

== Characters ==
Roach- an African American worker, mid-thirties

Maggot- a white worker, mid-thirties

Brandon- a white worker, early twenties

Cod- a white worker of Irish descent, mid-thirties

Tuck- an African American, mid- forties

Textile Worker- a woman, twenties

Sausage Man- a white man, energetic, somewhat elderly

Baquin- a white company manager, fifties
