= Newton-in-the-Isle =

Village in Cambridgeshire, England

Coordinates: 52.709°N 0.125°E

Newton
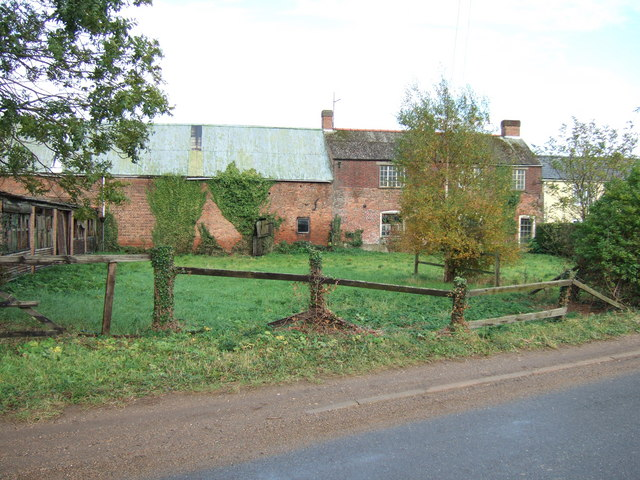

- Location within Cambridgeshire
- District: Fenland
- Shire county: Cambridgeshire
- Region: East
- Country: England
- Sovereign state: United Kingdom
- Post town: Wisbech
- Postcode district: PE13
- Dialling code: 01945
- Police: Cambridgeshire
- Fire: Cambridgeshire
- Ambulance: East of England

Newton-in-the-Isle is a village and civil parish in the Fenland District of the Isle of Ely, Cambridgeshire, England, The village is 4 miles (6 km) to the north of Wisbech.

== History ==
The "Isle" in Newton-in-the-Isle refers to the Isle of Ely.

The village is situated on the Silt Fen (also known as the Townland), formed before the Bronze Age. Newton was not listed in the Domesday Book and was probably settled later, with its first mention appearing in 1210.

According to Gardiner, "[i]n 1286 Sir Roger de Colvil[l]e married Desiderata, grand-daughter of Sir Stephen de Maresco, lord of Newton, Walsoken, and Tidd St Giles, and through her acquired Newton which became the chief residence of the (Colville) family for over 500 hundred years", until it was sold in 1792.

The College of St Mary by the Sea was founded here during the reign of Henry IV by Sir John Colville. Its endowments were specifically exempted from dissolution in the 1547 legislation of Edward VI, the lands instead being transferred to support the rectory of Newton.

The parish church of St James is a medieval structure with a tower. Formerly dedicated to St Katherine, it was built in the 12th century and widened in the 14th.

Woad (or wad) was grown and processed in the area. Woad mills were of two types:- permanent and temporary. The temporary woad mill taken down at Parson Drove in 1914 for the final time had previously been located at Newton, Spalding, Tydd St Giles and Whaplode Marsh. Woad mills remained at Algarkirk until 1927 and Skirbeck until 1932. A model of a woad mill is on display in Wisbech & Fenland Museum.

A village public house, The White Lion, closed in 1993 A further public house, The Woadman's Arms, which derived its name from the woad that was grown in the village until the 19th century, closed in 2017.

In 2016 Newton reverted to its earlier name of Newton-in-the-Isle. This was done due to issues distinguishing between other villages of the same name.
