= Customs and traditions of the Royal Navy =

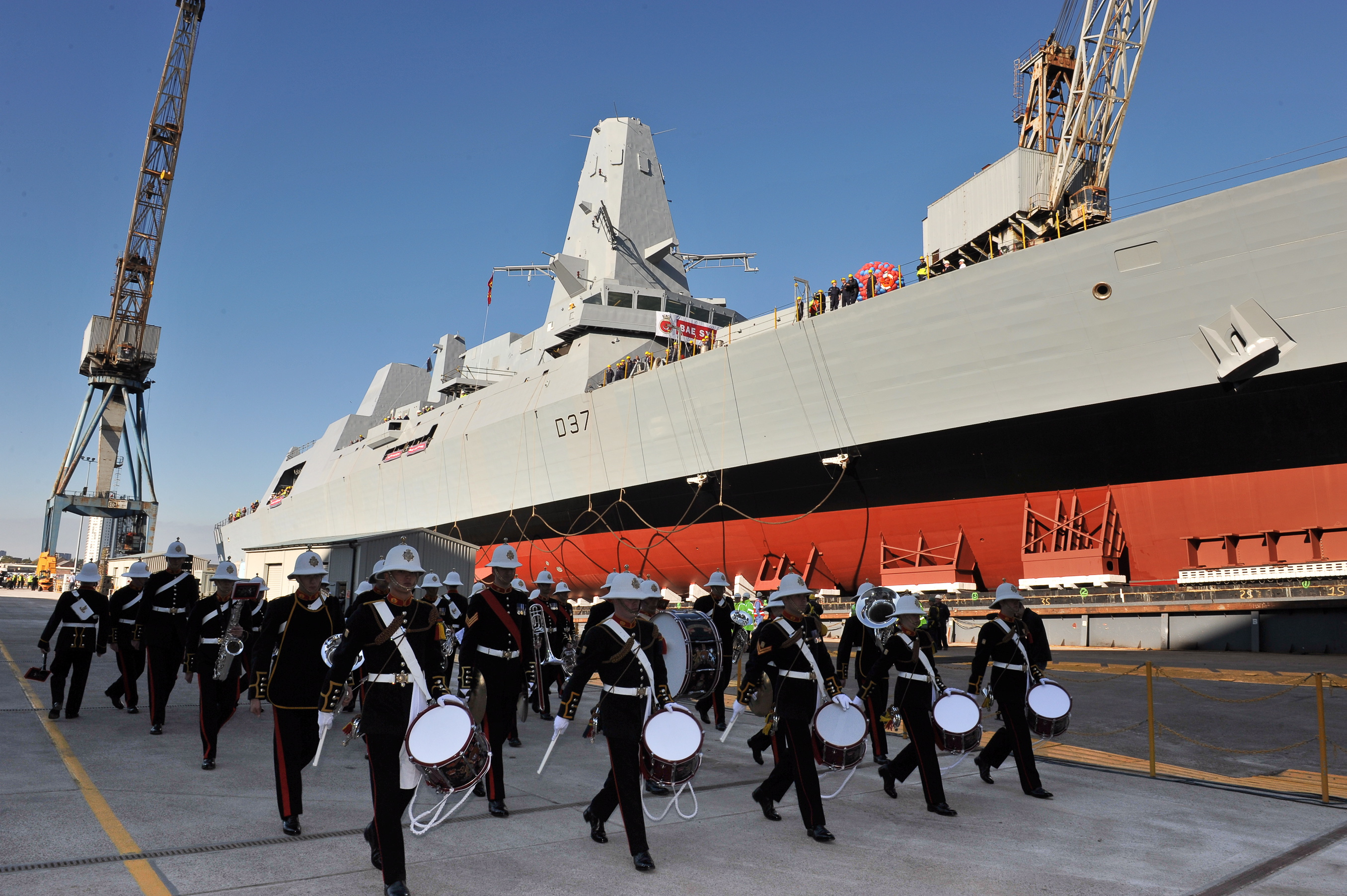
A corps of drums of the Royal Marines Band Service marching near HMS Duncan. Corps of drums are commonly found in the Royal Navy and Commonwealth navies, being an integral part of British naval music.

There are many customs and traditions associated with the Royal Navy of the United Kingdom. Many of these traditions have carried on to other Commonwealth navies, such as Canada, India, Australia and New Zealand. These include formal customs such as separate crests associated with ships, ensigns and fleet reviews. There are also several less formal customs and traditions, including Naval slang commonly referred to as Jackspeak and the traditional games of Uckers and Euchre.

== Heraldry ==
=== Ensigns ===
Commissioned ships and submarines wear the White Ensign at the stern whilst alongside during daylight hours and at the main-mast whilst under way. When alongside, the Union Jack is flown from the jackstaff at the bow, but can be flown under way on only special circumstances, i.e. when dressed with masthead flags (when it is flown at the jackstaff), to signal a court-martial is in progress (when it is flown from the starboard yardarm), or to indicate the presence of an Admiral of the Fleet, including the Lord High Admiral or the Monarch (when it is flown from the highest hoist).

=== Ships badges ===
The Royal Navy assigns badges to every ship, submarine, squadron and shore establishment. Before the age of steam ships, ships were identified by their figurehead. With the removal of the figurehead, ships’ badges and mottos were created to graphically represent the ships. The official process for creating the badge was initiated by Charles ffoulkes after World War I who was appointed as the Admiralty Advisor on Heraldry. Soon after his appointment the Ships' Badges Committee was established. This was amalgamated in 1983 with the Ships' Names Committee (founded in 1913) to create the Ships' Names and Badges Committee. The Naval Crown adorns the top of all the badges. The frame is gold rope. Originally, different classes of ships had different shapes, but currently all ships and submarines have a circular design. Shore establishments have an offset square design.

== Ship names ==
The names of ships are considered by the Ships' Names and Badges Committee. The committee passes their recommendations for approval by the Navy Board and then the Minister of Defence. The chosen names are then formally approved by the monarch.

== Ceremonial ==
The Royal Navy uses a number of unique ceremonies which often have their origins in the days of sail.

=== Colours ===
This is the formal ceremony of raising or lowering of a ship's ensign and jack when in port or at anchor. All shore establishments fly only the White Ensign.

HM ships, when lying in home ports and roads, are to hoist their colours at 0800 from 15th February to 31st October, inclusive, and at 0900 from 1st November to 14th February inclusive, but when abroad, at 0800 or 0900 as the Commander in Chief shall direct;

The lowering ceremony is referred to as "Sunset" or "Evening Colours" if sunset occurs after 2100. It may be accompanied by the "Sunset" bugle call. Ships at sea fly the White Ensign continuously.

=== Divisions ===
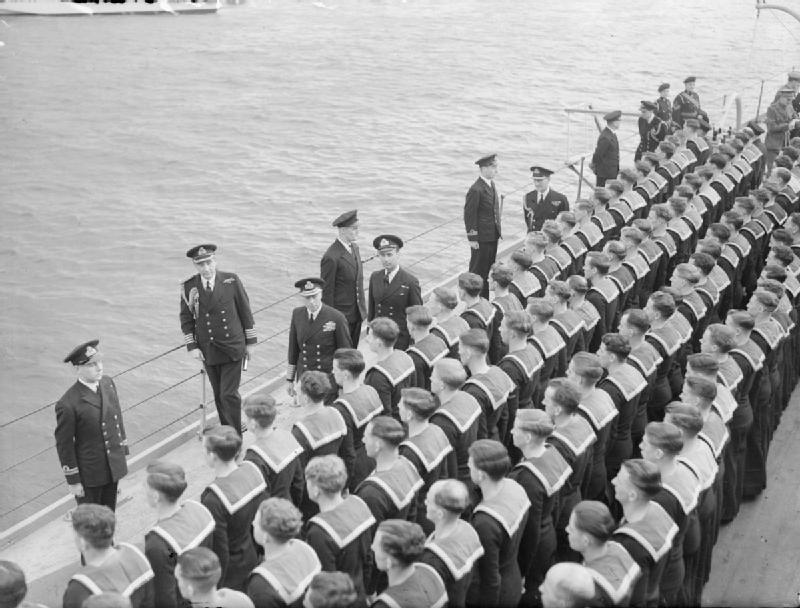
King George VI inspects Divisions aboard HMS Ramillies during the Second World War.

A formal parade of a ship's or shore establishment's company. At the Britannia Royal Naval College, the "Lord High Admiral's Divisions" is a parade held in the presence of the monarch or his representative.

=== Pipe the side ===
A ceremonial greeting by a guard of honour on the arrival of a flag officer or the commander of another ship, members of the royal family or foreign officers in uniform. The actual piping is done using a boatswain's call and consists of a low note, rising to high and falling to low again, lasting for twelve seconds on a single breath.

=== Pipe the still ===
A signal made boatswain's call which brings a ship's company to attention, especially for the "Colours" ceremony or when saluting a passing warship. A second call of "carry on!" returns the company to their duties.

== Fleet reviews ==
The Fleet Review is an irregular tradition of assembling the fleet before the monarch. For example, at the most recent Review on 28 June 2005 to mark the bi-centenary of the Battle of Trafalgar, 167 ships of the RN, and 30 other nations, were present. The fleet review in 2005 showed the marked contrast between the size of the Navy in 2005 compared to the last review in 1977. In total the Royal Navy had 67 ships on display, with the largest ship present being the French carrier Charles De Gaulle.

== Service nicknames ==
Nicknames for the service include The Andrew or Andrew Miller (of uncertain origin, possibly after a zealous press ganger) and the Senior Service. It is also referred to as the Grey Funnel Line: ship owning companies, or lines, painted their steamships' funnels in distinctive colours such as Cunard's red and black or the eponymous Blue Funnel Line, while the Royal Navy's funnels are plain grey.

== Naval salute ==
Originally subordinates would remove their headgear to a superior. In a book called New Art of War, printed in 1740, it is stated that;

When the King or Captain General is being saluted each Officer is to time his salute so as to pull off his hat when the person he salutes is almost opposite him.

This was different from the Army salute, which originated by showing that a person wasn't armed, hence a salute displaying an open palm. The Naval salute was a sign of respect, with Officers doffing their caps and seamen touching their forelock or knuckling their forehead. However, during the 19th century the Royal Navy was evolving into the modern Navy, as ships spent more time on station and ashore next to the Army and within Victorian society. Therefore, the modern salute, with the hand at 45 degrees, palm facing in, was adopted, and was more in keeping with actions of the Army. It is said that the reason the palm faces in is that sailors' hands were covered in tar from the sheets and rigging and it was considered unseemly to show an officer or a member of the Royal family a dirty palm; however, it is more likely that it was a natural development from the actions of raising a cap or touching forelock. The action also took the shortest up and down movement, unlike the Army salute, and was more practical onboard a warship. The change was not welcomed by all and some senior Officers were still noted to be raising their caps into the early 20th century.

== Toasts ==
The Toasts of the Royal Navy are a set of traditional drinking toasts.

Day	Toast	Alternatives
Sunday	"Absent friends"	"Absent friends and those at sea"
Monday	"Our ships at sea"	"Our native land. King and country"
Tuesday	"Our sailors" (before 2013, "Our men")	"Our mothers. Health and wealth"
Wednesday	"Ourselves" (usually with the informal reply "for nobody else will concern themselves with our well-being!")	"Ourselves. Our Swords. Old Ships" (Note: "Ships here meaning 'shipmates'")
Thursday	"A bloody war or a sickly season"	"The King"
Friday	"A willing foe and sea-room"	"Fox hunting and old port. Ships at sea"
Saturday	"Our families" (before 2013, "Our wives and sweethearts," usually with the reply "May they never meet!")	(no alternative)

In June 2013 the Tuesday and Saturday toasts were officially changed under orders from the Second Sea Lord, Vice-Admiral David Steel, to reflect the fact that women had been at sea in the Royal Navy for nearly two decades. Officially the Tuesday toast is now "our sailors" and the Saturday toast is "our families".

While most of these toasts are self-explanatory, "a bloody war or a sickly season" refers to the desire and likelihood of being promoted when many people die: during war or sickness. In addition, when referring to "Old Ships" (alternate toast for Wednesday), "ships" is referring to 'shipmates'.

On completion of the daily toast, it was often customary to conclude with the following tribute. "But the standing toast, that pleased the most was, to the wind that blows the ship that goes, and the lass that loves a sailor" – Charles Dibdin (1740–1814).

The toasts are typically given by the youngest officer present at the mess dinner. By tradition, these toasts are proposed immediately after the loyal toast, on the relevant day of the week. The Navy makes the loyal toast seated. This was a special dispensation granted by William IV, who had narrowly missed cracking his head several times on low deckheads when serving in the Royal Navy.

== Affiliation ==
Ships will engage in a number of affiliations. It is often misunderstood that ships are named after places when normally they are associated with the local lord e.g. the Duke of Marlborough. There were, however, a number of vessels named after places during World War II after schools, cadet units and charities. At one time every Sea Cadet unit in the UK had an affiliated ship (with the exception of Kettering, which is affiliated with 800 Naval Air Squadron; Yeovilton, now disbanded; and Yeovil unit which, owing to its location on RNAS Yeovilton (HMS Heron), is affiliated with 848 Helicopter Squadron). However, now that Sea Cadet units outnumber Royal Navy vessels, this is no longer possible.

== Naval slang ==
The RN has evolved a rich volume of slang, known as Jackspeak. Nowadays the British sailor is usually Jack (or Jenny) rather than the more historical Jack Tar, which is an allusion to either the former requirement to tar long hair or the tar-stained hands of sailors. Nicknames for a British sailor, applied by others, include Matelot (pronounced "matlow"), and derived from mid 19th century nautical slang: from French, variant of matenot which was also taken from the Middle Dutch mattenoot ‘bed companion’, because sailors had to share hammocks in twos, and Limey, from the lime juice given to British sailors to combat scurvy – mainly redundant in use within the Royal Navy. Royal Marines are fondly known as Bootnecks or often just as Royals.

== Uckers and Euchre ==
Uckers is a two or four player board game similar to Ludo that is traditionally played in the Royal Navy. It is fiercely competitive and rules differ between ships and stations (and between other services).

Euchre, pronounced you-ker, is a card game also played on board ships, in naval establishments and also in pubs in Cornwall and Devon. It is similar to Trumps, and equally competitive. Euchre involves nominated partners, is played with only the nine card and higher, apart from the two of spades – called the "Benny" – (making 25 cards in all) and uses the eight and seven cards as a score board. The winner is the first team to score 15.

== Songs and marches ==
There are several songs that are commonly associated with the Royal Navy including "Heart of Oak" (the official quick march) and "Rule, Britannia!".

== See also ==
- Trafalgar Night: On 21 October each year the commissioned officers of the Royal Navy celebrate the victory at the Battle of Trafalgar by holding a dinner in the officer's mess.
- Taranto Night: On 10/11 November, or as close as possible, the Fleet Air Arm celebrate the WWII strike on the Italian port of Taranto. This marks the formal mess dinner of the Air Arm in lieu of Trafalgar Night which is usually celebrated as a dinner with partners.
