= Amy Gaipa =

American actress

Amy Gaipa is an American actress. She is best known for playing Trudy Bolt, the female lead character Rose's maid in James Cameron's Titanic. Gaipa was born in 1970, attended Lake Michigan Catholic High School in St. Joseph, Michigan, and graduated from Hope College, Holland, Michigan in 1992 with a B.A. in Theatre.

== Partial filmography ==
- Titanic (1997) – Trudy Bolt
- An Englishman in New York (2009) – Audience Member # 2
- Silver Tongues (2011) – Naomi
- La vida inesperada (2013) – Carol
