= Rep Stage =

Defunct theatre in Howard County, Maryland, US

Rep Stage was founded in 1993 by former Artistic Director Valerie Lash. It was a professional Equity theatre based at Howard Community College in Howard County, Maryland. Rep Stage won 7 Helen Hayes Awards, garnered 37 nominations, received 6 Greater Baltimore Theater Awards and received consistent high critical acclaim from the media for its diverse programming and choice of challenging literature. In November 2022, the college announced that it would close Rep Stage in May 2023, saying that the school "must prioritize programs and services that directly serve students".

== See also ==
- Theater in Maryland
