= The Chesapeake Shakespeare Company =

The Chesapeake Shakespeare Company (CSC) is a theatre company based in Baltimore, Maryland. Founded in 2002 by Ian Gallanar and Heidi Busch-Gallanar, the Chesapeake Shakespeare Company has grown into one of the twenty largest Shakespeare theaters in the United States under the leadership of founding artistic director Ian Gallanar and producing executive director Lesley Malin. The company has performance spaces in Baltimore and Ellicott City, Maryland. Its main indoor space, the Chesapeake Shakespeare Company Theater, opened in 2014. They perform outdoor every summer at the Patapsco Female Institute Historic Park in Ellicott City, Maryland and they have a mobile stage, The Shakespeare Wagon, that tours parks and public spaces in Maryland.

== Production history ==
2002 Twelfth Night Directed by Ian Gallanar

2003 Romeo and Juliet Directed by Ian Gallanar

2003 The Comedy of Errors Directed by Christopher Marino

2004 Troilus & Cressida Directed by Patrick Kilpatrick

2004 Much Ado About Nothing Directed by Ian Gallanar

2004 Measure for Measure Directed by Christopher Niebling

2005 The Dog in the Manger by Lope de Vega Directed by Isabelle Anderson

2005 A Midsummer Night's Dream Directed by Ian Gallanar

2005 Coriolanus Directed by Ian Gallanar

2006 The Imaginary Invalid by Molière Directed by Ken Elston

2006 King Lear Directed by Ian Gallanar

2006 The Taming of the Shrew Directed by Patrick Kilpatrick

2006 Love's Labor's Lost Directed by Jenny Leopold

2007 The Front Page Directed by Ian Gallanar

2007 As You Like It Directed by Ian Gallanar

2007 Henry V Directed by James Ricks

2007 Macbeth Directed by Ian Gallanar

2008 A Doll's House by Henrick Ibsen Directed by Kevin Costa

2008 The Comedy of Errors Directed by Ian Gallanar

2008 The Tempest Directed by Patrick Kilpatrick

2008 Macbeth Directed by Ian Gallanar

2009 The Country Wife Directed by Heather Nathans

2009 Cyrano de Bergerac Directed by Ian Gallanar

2009 Twelfth Night Directed by Jenny Leopold

2009 Julius Caesar Directed by Frank Moorman

2010 Lysistrata Directed by Ian Gallanar

2010 Much Ado About Nothing Directed by Ryan Whinnem

2010 Hamlet Directed by Ian Gallanar

2010 Titus Andronicus Directed by Kevin Costa

2011 Cymbeline Directed by Ian Gallanar

2011 A Midsummer Night's Dream Directed by Ian Gallanar

2011 The Complete Works of William Shakespeare (Abridged) Directed by Scott Alan Small

2011 Our Town Directed by Ian Gallanar

2012 The Merchant of Venice Directed by Teresa Castracane

2012 Romeo and Juliet Directed by Jenny Leopold

2012 Pride and Prejudice Directed by Isabelle Anderson

2012 Richard III Directed by Ian Gallanar

2013 The Two Gentlemen of Verona Directed by Patrick Kilpatrick

2013 The Taming of the Shrew Directed by Ian Gallanar

2013 Antony and Cleopatra Directed by Ralph Alan Cohen

2013 Dracula Directed by Scott Alan Small

2014 As You Like It Directed by Patrick Kilpatrick

2014 A Midsummer Night's Dream Directed by Ian Gallanar

2014 Richard II Directed by Kevin Costa

2014 A Christmas Carol Directed by Ian Gallanar

2015 Uncle Vanya Directed by Ian Gallanar

2015 The Importance of Being Earnest Directed by Erin Bone Steele

2015 Romeo and Juliet Directed by Ian Gallanar

2015 The Comedy of Errors Directed by Scott Alan Small

2015 Much Ado About Nothing Directed by Matthew R. Wilson

2015 Titus Andronicus Directed by Ian Gallanar

2015 A Christmas Carol Directed by Ian Gallanar & Scott Alan Small

2016 Wild Oats Directed by Ian Gallanar

2016 Macbeth Directed by Paul Barnes

2016 The Three Musketeers Directed by Patrick Kilpatrick & Ian Gallanar

2016 Othello Directed by Ian Gallanar

2016 Anne of the Thousand Days Directed by Kasi Campbell

2016 A Christmas Carol By Ian Gallanar Directed by Scott Alan Small

2017 Richard III Directed by Ian Gallanar

2017 The Taming of the Shrew Directed by Ian Gallanar

2017 The Fantasticks! by Schmidt & Jones Directed by Curt Tofteland

2017 The Tempest Directed by Lizzi Albert

2017 Julius Caesar Directed by Michael Toylado

2017 A Christmas Carol By Ian Gallanar Directed by Scott Alan Small

2018 Red Velvet by Lolita Chakrabarti Directed by Shirley Basfield-Dunlap

2018 The Winter's Tale Directed by Isabelle Anderson

2018 Alice in Wonderland by Florida Friebus & Eva Le Gallienne Directed by Ian Gallanar

2018 A Midsummer Night's Dream Directed by Gerrad Taylor

2018 She Stoops to Conquer by Oliver Goldsmith Directed by Ian Gallanar

2018 A Christmas Carol By Ian Gallanar Directed by Gerrad Taylor

2019 Henry IV Part 1 Directed by Ian Gallanar

2019 Henry IV Part 2 Directed by Ian Gallanar and Gerrad Taylor

2019 The Diary of Anne Frank by Goodrich & Hackett Directed by Eve Muson

2019 Macbeth Directed by Ian Gallanar

2019 Love's Labour's Lost Directed by Erin Bone Steele

2019 Dracula by Steven Deitz Directed by Gerrad Taylor

2019 A Christmas Carol by Ian Gallanar Directed by Scott Alan Small

2020 Measure for Measure Directed by Lisa Bruneau

2020 The Complete Works of William Shakespeare (Abridged) by Adam Long, Daniel Singer, and Jess Winfield Directed by Ian Gallanar

2021 Pericles Directed by Matthew Wilson

2021 A Christmas Carol by Ian Gallanar Directed by Erin Bone Steele and Lizzi Albert

2022 A Raisin in the Sun by Lorraine Hansberry Directed by Reggie Phoenix

2022 Henry V Directed by Alec Wild

2022 Much Ado About Nothing Directed by Seamus Miller

2022 Twelfth Night Directed by Ian Gallanar

2023 The Complete Works of William Shakespeare (Abridged) by Adam Long, Daniel Singer, and Jess Winfield Directed by Ian Gallanar

2023 Hamlet Directed by Eleanor Holdridge

2023 Macbeth Directed by Lauren Davis

2023 A Midsummer Night's Dream for Shakespeare Beyond Directed by Ian Gallanar

2023 As You Like It Directed by Ian Gallanar

2023 A Christmas Carol by Charles Dickens, Adapted by Laura Rocklyn, directed by Erin Bone Steele

2024 The Oresteia Freely Adapted from Aeschylus by Ellen McLaughlin, directed by Lise Bruneau

2024 Romeo and Juliet Directed by Gerrad Alex Taylor

2024 The Merry Wives of Windsor Directed by Ben Lambert

2024 August Wilson's Joe Turner's Come and Gone Directed by KenYatta Rogers

2024 A Christmas Carol by Charles Dickens, Adapted by Laura Rocklyn, directed by Séamus Miller

2025 It's The Comedy of Errors, Hon! (Mostly) by William Shakespeare, directed and adapted by Ian Gallanar

2025 Mary Stuart by Friedrich Schiller, in a new version by Peter Oswald, directed by Ian Gallanar

2025 Persuasion by Sarah Rose Kearns, directed by Megan Behm

2026 Fences by August Wilson, directed by Reginald L. Douglas

2026 The Tempest by William Shakespeare, directed by Ian Gallanar

== See also ==
- Theater in Maryland
