= Transeamus =

Studio album by the Hilliard Ensemble
- Released: October 10, 2014
- Recorded: November 2012
- Studio: Propstei St. Gerold; St. Gerold, Austria
- Genre: Classical, choral, christmas carol
- Length: 1:07:24
- Label: ECM New Series; ECM New Series 2408
- Producer: Manfred Eicher

The Hilliard Ensemble chronology
Il Cor Tristo (2013)	Transeamus (2014)

Professional ratings
Review scores
Source	Rating
All Music	4/5 stars
The Guardian	4/5 stars

Transeamus ("We travel on") is an album by the Hilliard Ensemble recorded in November 2012 and released on the ECM New Series in October 2014—the quartet's final album.

== Composition ==
On this album, the Hilliard Ensemble sings a collection of polyphony from the 15th century, most of them are from anonymous authors, but some of them was written by John Plummer, Walter Lambe, William Cornysh and Sheryngham. Transeamus also includes several ancient carols on a Christmas theme. About the album, David James tells that "This is music that we were born and bred to sing. We started singing many of these pieces as boys in choirs, so singing this music is for us like going home."

== Reception ==
All Music's James Manheim writes, "Even though the music is all but unknown, the group has performed these pieces as a live program with powerful effect in the past." and "This is a fine closing chapter to a remarkable career."

The Guardian gave the album four stars, with Nicholas Kenyon saying of the ensemble, "They have admirably decided to quit while they’re ahead, and take their leave with this subtle, underplayed collection of carols and motets from the English repertory.... We will miss the Hilliards' unique explorations."

== Track listing ==
All lyrics are written by anonymous authors, except are indicated.

No.	Title	Writer(s)	Length
1.	"Thomas gemma cantuariae/Thomas cesus in Doveria"		2:39
2.	"St. Thomas Honour We"		3:19
3.	"Clangattuba"		6:38
4.	"Anna mater"	John Plummer	6:52
5.	"Lullay, I Saw"		2:41
6.	"O pulcherrima mulierum"	John Plummer	3:17
7.	"There Is No Rose"		4:43
8.	"Stella Caeli"	Walter Lambe	6:40
9.	"Marvel Not Joseph"		4:45
10.	"Ecce quod natura"		4:37
11.	"Ave Maria, mater Dei"	William Cornysh	2:58
12.	"Ah! My Dear Son"		7:12
13.	"Sancta Mater Gracie/Dou Way Robin"		2:36
14.	"Ah, Gentle Jesu"	Sheryngham	8:27
Total length:			1:07:24

== Personnel ==
=== Hilliard Ensemble ===
- David James – countertenor
- Rogers Covey-Crump – tenor
- Steven Harrold – tenor
- Gordon Jones – baritone
