= Mnemosyne (album) =

Studio album by Jan Garbarek / The Hilliard Ensemble
- Released: 2 April 1999
- Recorded: April 1998
- Genre: Jazz, classical
- Label: ECM New Series; ECM 1700/01
- Producer: Manfred Eicher, Jan Garbarek

Jan Garbarek chronology
Rites (1998)	Mnemosyne (1999)	In Praise of Dreams (2004)

Professional ratings
Review scores
Source	Rating
AllMusic	3.5/5 stars
The Penguin Guide to Jazz Recordings	3.5/4 stars

Mnemosyne is an album by Norwegian jazz saxophonist Jan Garbarek and the Hilliard Ensemble, recorded in April 1998 and released on ECM a year later—a sequel to their previous collaboration, Officium (1994).

== Track listing ==
Disc one

1. "Quechua Song" – 7:12
2. "O Lord in Thee Is All My Trust" – 5:09
3. "Estonian Lullaby" – 1:58
4. "Remember Me My Dear" – 6:30
5. "Gloria" – 6:03
6. "Fayrfax Africanus" – 4:05
7. "Agnus Dei" – 8:38
8. "Novus novus" – 2:18
9. "Se je fays dueil" – 5:12
10. "O Ignis Spiritus" – 10:53

Disc two

1. "Alleluia nativitatis" – 5:06
2. "Delphic Paean" – 4:46
3. "Strophe and Counter-Strophe" – 5:02
4. "Mascarados" – 5:02
5. "Loiterando" – 5:33
6. "Estonian Lullaby" – 2:01
7. "Russian Psalm" – 3:45
8. "Eagle Dance" – 4:48
9. "When Jesus Wept" – 3:22
10. "Hymn to the Sun" – 7:28

== Personnel ==
- Jan Garbarek – soprano and tenor saxophones
- The Hilliard Ensemble
  - Rogers Covey-Crump – tenor
  - John Potter – tenor
  - Gordon Jones – baritone
  - David James – countertenor
