= In Praise of Dreams =

Studio album by Jan Garbarek
- Released: 21 September 2004
- Recorded: 24 March – 4 June 2003
- Studio: Blue Jay, Carlisle, Massachusetts; AP Studio, Paris, Oslo
- Genre: Jazz
- Length: 52:25
- Label: ECM; ECM 1880
- Producer: Manfred Eicher, Jan Garbarek

Jan Garbarek chronology
Mnemosyne (1999)	In Praise of Dreams (2004)	Dresden (2007)

Professional ratings
Review scores
Source	Rating
AllMusic	4/5 stars
The Penguin Guide to Jazz Recordings	3/4 stars

In Praise of Dreams is an album by Jan Garbarek recorded over the last week of March and the first week of April in 2003 and released on ECM the following year. In 2005, it was nominated for the Grammy for Best Contemporary Jazz Album.

== Track listing ==
All compositions by Jan Garbarek.

1. "As Seen from Above" – 4:42
2. "In Praise of Dreams" – 5:22
3. "One Goes There Alone" – 5:09
4. "Knot of Place and Time" – 6:27
5. "If You Go Far Enough" – 0:44
6. "Scene from Afar" – 5:19
7. "Cloud of Unknowing" – 5:26
8. "Without Visible Sign" – 5:04
9. "Iceburn" – 5:02
10. "Conversation with a Stone" – 4:25
11. "A Tale Begun" – 4:39

== Personnel ==
- Jan Garbarek – soprano saxophone, tenor saxophone, synthesizers
- Kim Kashkashian – viola (tracks 2–4, 6–10)
- Manu Katché – drums, percussion, samples
