= Officium Novum =

Live album by Jan Garbarek and The Hilliard Ensemble
- Released: 20 September 2010
- Recorded: June 2009
- Studio: Propstei Sankt Gerold; Sankt Gerold, Austria
- Genre: Jazz, Early music
- Length: 61:03
- Label: ECM New Series; ECM New Series 2125
- Producer: Manfred Eicher

Jan Garbarek chronology
Dresden (2009)	Officium Novum (2010)	Magico: Carta de Amor (2012)

Officium Novum is an album by Norwegian saxophonist Jan Garbarek and the Hilliard Ensemble recorded in Austria in June 2009 and released on ECM in September the following year. The album is a sequel to their 1994 collaboration Officium.

== Reception ==
Professional ratings
Review scores
Source	Rating
Allmusic	4.5/5 stars

The AllMusic review by Stephen Eddins states "Like the first album, this one is suffused with a sense of distant mystery and a profound, powerful melancholy that is given voice with intense feeling. The sound again is spacious and warmly resonant, with an earthy, enveloping ambience. This album will be a must-have for anyone who loved the first one, and it should appeal to any listener with an affinity for meditative Eastern European spirituality, especially when tied to contemporary expressivity and stylistic freedom."

== Track listing ==
All compositions by Jan Garbarek except as indicated

1. "Ov Zarmanali" (Komitas) – 4:11
2. "Svjete Tihij" (Traditional) – 4:14
3. "Allting Finns" – 4:18
4. "Litany: Litany/Otche Nash/Otche Nash" (Nikolai N. Kedrov/Traditional/Anonymous) – 13:06
5. "Surb, Surb" (Komitas) – 6:40
6. "Most Holy Mother of God" (Arvo Pärt) – 4:34
7. "Tres Morillas M’enamoran" (Anonymous) – 3:32
8. "Sirt Im Sasani" (Komitas) – 4:06
9. "Hays Hark Nviranats Ukhti" (Komitas) – 6:25
10. "Alleluia Nativitas" (Pérotin) – 5:20
11. "We Are the Stars" – 4:09
12. "Nur Ein Weniges Noch" (Giorgos Seferis) – 0:19

== Personnel ==
- Jan Garbarek – soprano saxophone, tenor saxophone
- The Hilliard Ensemble
  - David James – countertenor
  - Rogers Covey-Crump – tenor
  - Steven Harrold – tenor
  - Gordon Jones – baritone
