= Theme to the Gaurdian =

Studio album by Bill Connors
- Released: 1975
- Recorded: November 1974
- Studio: Arne Bendiksen Studio; Oslo, Norway
- Genre: Jazz
- Length: 40:30
- Label: ECM 1057 ST
- Producer: Manfred Eicher

Bill Connors chronology
Theme to the Gaurdian (1975)	Pyramid (1977)

Theme to the Gaurdian is the debut album by American jazz guitarist Bill Connors, recorded in November 1974 and released on ECM the following year.

== Critical reception ==
Professional ratings
Review scores
Source	Rating
AllMusic	4/5 stars
The Penguin Guide to Jazz	3/4 stars
The Rolling Stone Jazz & Blues Album Guide	3/5 stars
The Virgin Encyclopedia of Jazz	4/5 stars

The AllMusic review by John W. Patterson awarded the album four stars stating:

This release of Connors is truly excellent acoustic guitar work with some of the most unique compositions and playing style you will find anywhere. Connors dubs one track as a sort of complex and exotic chordal progression base structure of strummed rhythms and/or a tapestry of finger roll picking. Over this landscape of dreamy, moody, surreal or frenetic design Connors solos and augments the original track of his playing. The effect is a ghostly dance of melancholy angst and passionate wailings.

== Track listing ==
All tracks are written by Bill Connors except where noted.

No.	Title	Writer(s)	Length
1.	"Theme to the Gaurdian"		5:20
2.	"Childs Eyes"		4:26
3.	"Song for a Crow"		4:16
4.	"Sad Hero"		4:30
5.	"Sea Song"	Glenn Cronkhite	5:06
6.	"Frantic Desire"		2:56
7.	"Folk Song"		6:37
8.	"My Favorite Fantasy"		4:26
9.	"The Highest Mountain"		3:25

== Personnel ==
- Bill Connors – guitar
