= Dresden (album) =

Live album by Jan Garbarek
- Released: September 2009
- Recorded: October 20, 2007
- Venue: Alter Schlachthof; Dresden, Germany
- Genre: Jazz
- Length: 122:15
- Label: ECM; ECM 2100/01
- Producer: Manfred Eicher

Jan Garbarek chronology
In Praise of Dreams (2004)	Dresden (2009)	Officium Novum (2010)

Professional ratings
Review scores
Source	Rating
AllMusic	4.5/5 stars

Dresden: In Concert is a live double-album by Norwegian saxophonist Jan Garbarek recorded on October 20, 2007, and released on ECM in 2009. Though he had been recording consistently with ECM for nearly forty years, it was Garbarek's first live album with his own group.

== Track listing ==
All compositions by Jan Garbarek, unless otherwise noted

CD 1

1. Paper Nut (L. Shankar) – 7:55
2. The Tall Tear Trees – 5:14
3. Heitor – 9:16
4. Twelve Moons – 10:43
5. Rondo Amoroso (Harald Sæverud) – 6:59
6. Tao (Yuri Daniel) – 4:45
7. Milagre dos Peixes (Milton Nascimento/Fernando Brant) – 12:53

CD 2

1. There Were Swallows – 7:18
2. The Reluctant Saxophonist – 8:20
3. Transformations (Rainer Brüninghaus) – 7:18
4. Once I Dreamt a Tree Upside Down – 7:18
5. Fugl – 6:00
6. Maracuja – 7:44
7. Grooving Out! (Manu Katché) – 3:26
8. Nu Bein' – 5:52
9. Voy Cantando – 11:14

== Personnel ==
- Jan Garbarek – soprano saxophone, tenor saxophone, willow flute
- Rainer Brüninghaus – piano, keyboards
- Yuri Daniel – electric bass
- Manu Katché – drums
