= Visible World =

Studio album by Jan Garbarek
- Released: March 1996
- Recorded: June 1995
- Studio: Rainbow Studio; Oslo, Norway
- Genre: Jazz
- Length: 75:14
- Label: ECM; ECM 1585
- Producer: Manfred Eicher

Jan Garbarek chronology
Officium (1994)	Visible World (1996)	Rites (1998)

Visible World is an album by Norwegian saxophonist Jan Garbarek recorded in June 1995 and released on ECM the following year.

== Reception ==
The AllMusic review by Chris Kelsey awarded the album 2½ stars stating "This is quiet, contemplative music for the most part—attractive, but not superficially pretty. Its grooves are less celebratory than melancholic. There's an intensity here borne of deep concentration and commitment to beauty. Garbarek has come a long way since his early days as a quasi-free jazz experimentalist. This music is not jazz, nor is it experimental. But it is compelling in its way, representative of a first-rate creative musician, beyond category."

Professional ratings
Review scores
Source	Rating
Allmusic	2.5/5 stars
The Penguin Guide to Jazz Recordings	3/4 stars

== Track listing ==
All compositions by Jan Garbarek except as indicated

1. "Red Wind" – 3:52
2. "The Creek" – 4:30
3. "The Survivor" – 4:46
4. "The Healing Smoke" – 7:13
5. "Visible World (Chiaro)" – 4:07
6. "Desolate Mountains I" – 6:46
7. "Desolate Mountains II" – 6:02
8. "Visible World (Scuro)" – 4:32
9. "Giulietta" – 3:45
10. "Desolate Mountains III" – 1:28
11. "Pygmy Lullaby" (Traditional) – 6:12
12. "The Quest" – 2:58
13. "The Arrow" – 4:21
14. "The Scythe" – 1:48
15. "Evening Land" (Jan Garbarek, Mari Boine) – 12:29

== Personnel ==
- Jan Garbarek – soprano saxophone, tenor saxophone, keyboards, percussion
- Rainer Brüninghaus – piano, synthesizer (tracks 3, 4, 6, 7 & 10–12)
- Eberhard Weber – bass (tracks 2, 3, 7, 8, 11 & 12)
- Manu Katché – drums (tracks 2, 3, 11 & 13)
- Marilyn Mazur – drums (tracks 6, 7 & 9), percussion (tracks 1, 4, 5, 8, 9, 11–13 & 15)
- Trilok Gurtu – tabla (track 13)
- Mari Boine – vocals (track 15)
