= Dis (album) =

Studio album by Jan Garbarek
- Released: May 1977
- Recorded: December 1976
- Studio: Talent Studios; Oslo, Norway
- Genre: Jazz
- Length: 48:36
- Label: ECM; ECM 1093 ST
- Producer: Manfred Eicher

Jan Garbarek chronology
Dansere (1975)	Dis (1977)	Places (1977)

Dis is an album by Norwegian jazz saxophonist Jan Garbarek, recorded for ECM in December 1976 and released in May the following year. Garbarek is backed by American jazz guitarist Ralph Towner, with a guest appearance from Den Norske Messingsekstett on brass.

== Reception ==
Professional ratings
Review scores
Source	Rating
AllMusic	2/5 stars
The Penguin Guide to Jazz	4/4 stars
The Rolling Stone Jazz Record Guide	3/5 stars

The Penguin Guide to Jazz selected Dis as part of its suggested Core Collection.

== Track listing ==
All tracks are written by Jan Garbarek.

Side I
No.	Title	Length
1.	"Vandrere"	13:42
2.	"Krusning"	5:40
3.	"Viddene"	5:44
Total length:		25:06

Side II
No.	Title	Length
1.	"Skygger"	10:10
2.	"Yr"	5:59
3.	"Dis"	7:52
Total length:		24:01 49:07

== Personnel ==
=== Musicians ===
- Jan Garbarek – soprano and tenor saxophones, wood flute
- Ralph Towner – 12 string guitar, classical guitar

==== Additional musicians ====
- Jan Erik Kongshaug – windharp ("Vandrere", "Viddene", "Dis")
  - harp built by Sverre Larssen and recorded by Jan Erik Kongshaug; played by the wind
- Den Norske Messingsekstett – brass ("Skygger")

=== Technical personnel ===
- Manfred Eicher – producer
- Jan Erik Kongshaug – recording engineer
- Barbara Wojirsch – layout
- Franco Fontana – photography
