= My Song (Keith Jarrett album) =

Studio album by Keith Jarrett
- Released: June 1978
- Recorded: November 1977
- Studio: Talent Studios; Oslo, Norway
- Genre: Jazz
- Length: 48:34
- Label: ECM 1115
- Producer: Manfred Eicher

Keith Jarrett chronology
Sun Bear Concerts (1978)	My Song (1978)	Bop-Be (1978)

Keith Jarrett European Quartet chronology
Belonging (1974)	My Song (1978)	Nude Ants (1980)

My Song is an album by jazz musician Keith Jarrett, recorded in November 1977 and released on ECM in June the following year—the second release from his "European Quartet" featuring saxophonist Jan Garbarek and rhythm section, Palle Danielsson and Jon Christensen, after Belonging (1974).

== Reception ==
Professional ratings
Review scores
Source	Rating
AllMusic	4.5/5 stars
The Penguin Guide to Jazz	3.5/4 stars
The Rolling Stone Jazz Record Guide	3/5 stars

The AllMusic review by Scott Yanow stated, "Due to the popularity of the haunting "My Song," this album is the best known of the Jarrett-Garbarek collaborations and it actually is their most rewarding meeting on record. Jarrett contributed all six compositions and the results are relaxed and introspective yet full of inner tension."

Writing for the now defunct jazz magazine Jazz.com, Ted Gioia rated the track The Journey Home 99/100, stating:

When Keith Jarrett left behind his highly esteemed American quartet for a new band of Norwegians, the jazz world was puzzled and a little bit skeptical. Yet this group—the so-called European quartet—produced some of the most successful music of Jarrett's career, and had a very big seller with the ''My Song'' album. Even today, critics are quicker to praise the looser, more unpredictable American quartet; and, certainly, if jazz were sports, you would get fired from the GM job for trading Paul Motian for Jon Christensen, etc. But jazz is not sports, and this band achieved a holistic transcendence that made them an ideal ensemble for realizing Jarrett's compositions of the period. ''The Journey Home'' is a case in point. The star here is Jarrett's composition, which moves through several distinct moods, from a melancholy rubato which leads into a spirited folksy melody with a very danceable beat (one of this composer's most inspired moments) before the piece settles into a slow 9/8 section that could stand on its own as a significant composition. The four musicians enter into the inner workings of this music with perfect sympathy and—that great rarity in the jazz world—almost no signs of ego. The whole ''My Song'' album is essential listening for Jarrett fans, and perhaps came the closest of any Jarrett quartet album to matching the type of musical personality he showed when playing his famous solo piano concerts. But if you want to start out with a single track as introduction to the European quartet, this is a very good place to begin.

== Track listing ==
All compositions by Keith Jarrett.

1. "Questar" - 9:12
2. "My Song" - 6:12
3. "Tabarka" - 9:13
4. "Country" - 5:03
5. "Mandala" - 8:20
6. "The Journey Home" - 10:34

== Personnel ==
=== European Quartet ===
- Keith Jarrett – piano, percussion
- Jan Garbarek – tenor and soprano saxophones
- Palle Danielsson – bass
- Jon Christensen – drums

=== Production ===
- Manfred Eicher - producer
- Jan Erik Kongshaug - recording engineer
- Roberto Masotti - photo
- Barbara Wojirsch - cover design and layout
