= Belonging (Keith Jarrett album) =

Studio album by Keith Jarrett
- Released: 1974
- Recorded: April 24–25, 1974
- Studios: Arne Bendiksen Studios; Oslo, Norway
- Genre: Jazz
- Length: 46:35
- Label: ECM 1050 ST
- Producer: Manfred Eicher

Keith Jarrett chronology
Treasure Island (1974)	Belonging (1974)	Luminessence (1975)

Keith Jarrett European Quartet chronology
Belonging (1974)	My Song (1977)

Belonging is a studio album by American jazz pianist Keith Jarrett, recorded over two days in April 1974 and released on ECM later that year—the debut of Jarrett's "European Quartet", featuring saxophonist Jan Garbarek and rhythm section Palle Danielsson and Jon Christensen. Because Jarrett's contract with ABC/Impulse! prevented him from performing with the quartet under his own name, the group became known as the "Belonging" quartet.

== Background ==
Jarrett was known for valuing spontaneity over technical perfection, and, according to producer Manfred Eicher, refused to record more than one take of the title piece, thus goading the musicians to a high level of concentration. Garbarek later recalled that he had never recorded a piece so quickly, and with such minimal rehearsal.

"'Long as You Know You're Living Yours" served as the theme song for CBC Radio's Writers and Company program during its 33-year-long run starting in 1990.

== Controversy and legal dispute ==
The tune "'Long as You Know You're Living Yours" was the subject of a lawsuit between Jarrett and jazz-rock group Steely Dan: Jarrett alleged that the duo's title track from their 1980 album Gaucho had stolen from the song. Co-writer Donald Fagen admitted he'd loved the track and was strongly influenced by it. Jarrett sued for copyright infringement and was then added as a co-author of the song.

== Reception ==
Professional ratings
Review scores
Source	Rating
AllMusic	4.5/5 stars
Encyclopedia of Popular Music	4/5 stars
The Penguin Guide to Jazz	4/4 stars
The Rolling Stone Jazz Record Guide	4/5 stars
The Virgin Encyclopedia of Jazz	4/5 stars

AllMusic reviewer Richard S. Ginell awarded the album 4½ stars, stating, "The record operates at its strongest level when Jarrett locks the quartet into his winning gospel mode on ''Long as You Know You're Living Yours' and the tense drive of 'Spiral Dance'; the reflective numbers are less compelling. Still, this LP-turned-CD successfully bucked the powerful electric trends of its time and holds up well today."

The authors of The Penguin Guide to Jazz awarded the album 4 stars, and wrote: "Belonging... is a superb album, characterized by some of the pianist's most open and joyous playing on record; his double-time solo on 'The Windup' is almost Tatum-like in its exuberance and fluency. The country-blues feel of ''Long as You Know You're Living Yours' is a confident reflection of his music roots. The ballads 'Blossom', 'Solstice' and the title-piece... are remarkable by any standards; Garbarek's slightly out-of-tune opening statement on 'Solstice' and Danielsson's subsequent solo are masterful, while Jarrett's own split chords accentuate the mystery and ambiguity of the piece."

== Track listing ==
All music composed by Keith Jarrett

1. "Spiral Dance" – 4:11
2. "Blossom" – 12:15
3. "'Long as You Know You're Living Yours" – 6:14
4. "Belonging" – 2:15
5. "The Windup" – 8:27
6. "Solstice" – 13:13

== Personnel ==
=== European Quartet ===
- Keith Jarrett – piano
- Jan Garbarek – tenor and soprano saxophones
- Palle Danielsson – bass
- Jon Christensen – drums

=== Technical personnel ===
- Manfred Eicher – production
- Jan Erik Kongshaug – recording engineer
- Tadayuki Naitoh – cover design and layout

== See also ==
- 1974 in jazz
- "Belonging (Branford Marsalis Quartet album)" – a 2025 reinterpretation of the album
