= Of Mist and Melting =

Studio album by Bill Connors
- Released: 1978
- Recorded: December 1977
- Studio: Talent Studio; Oslo, Norway
- Genre: Jazz
- Length: 47:12
- Label: ECM 1120 ST
- Producer: Manfred Eicher

Bill Connors chronology
Pyramid (1977)	Of Mist and Melting (1978)	Swimming with a Hole in My Body (1979)

Of Mist and Melting is the second album by American guitarist and composer Bill Connors recorded in December 1977 and released on ECM the following year. The quartet features saxophonist Jan Garbarek and rhythm section Gary Peacock and Jack DeJohnette.

== Critical reception ==
Professional ratings
Review scores
Source	Rating
AllMusic	3/5 stars
The Penguin Guide to Jazz	3/4 stars
The Virgin Encyclopedia of Jazz	3/5 stars

The AllMusic review by Paul Kohler awarded the album 3 stars calling it "an atmospheric jazz album".

== Track listing ==
All tracks are written by Bill Connors.

Side I
No.	Title	Length
1.	"Melting"	11:33
2.	"Not Forgetting"	6:33
3.	"Face in the Water"	6:25

Side II
No.	Title	Length
1.	"Aubade"	9:38
2.	"Café vue"	5:40
3.	"Unending"	7:33

== Personnel ==
- Bill Connors – guitar
- Jan Garbarek – tenor saxophone
- Gary Peacock – bass
- Jack DeJohnette – drums
