= Swimming with a Hole in My Body =

Studio album by Bill Connors
- Released: March 25, 1980
- Recorded: August 1979
- Studio: Talent Studio; Oslo, Norway
- Genre: Jazz
- Length: 42:21
- Label: ECM 1158
- Producer: Manfred Eicher

Bill Connors chronology
Of Mist and Melting (1977)	Swimming with a Hole in My Body (1980)	Step It (1983)

Swimming with a Hole in My Body is a solo album by American guitarist and composer Bill Connors, recorded in August 1979 and released on ECM March the following year—his third for the label. Like his debut album, it is performed entirely on acoustic guitar.

== Reception ==
Professional ratings
Review scores
Source	Rating
AllMusic	4.5/5 stars
The Penguin Guide to Jazz	3/4 stars
The Virgin Encyclopedia of Jazz	4/5 stars

The AllMusic review by Paul Kohler stated: "Brilliant solo acoustic guitar with some overdubs. Required listening".

== Track listing ==
All compositions by Bill Connors

1. "Feet First" – 6:09
2. "Wade" – 3:24
3. "Sing and Swim" – 4:35
4. "Frog Stroke" – 5:08
5. "Surrender to the Water" – 10:45
6. "Survive" – 2:05
7. "With Strings Attached" – 2:47
8. "Breath" – 7:28

== Personnel ==
- Bill Connors – acoustic guitar

=== Production ===
- Manfred Eicher – producer
- Jan Erik Kongshaug – engineer
- Isio Saba – photography
- Joel Meyerowitz – cover photo
- Barbara Wojirsch, Dieter Rehm – design
