= Photo with Blue Sky, White Cloud, Wires, Windows and a Red Roof =

Studio album by the Jan Garbarek Group
- Released: 22 July 1979
- Recorded: 20 December 1978
- Studio: Talent Studio; Oslo, Norway
- Genre: Jazz
- Length: 43:49
- Label: ECM; ECM 1135
- Producer: Manfred Eicher

Jan Garbarek chronology
Places (1978)	Photo with Blue Sky, White Cloud, Wires, Windows and a Red Roof (1979)	Mágico (1980)

Photo with Blue Sky, White Cloud, Wires, Windows and a Red Roof is an album by the Jan Garbarek Group. It was recorded on 20 December 1978 and released on ECM the following year. The quintet features rhythm section Bill Connors, John Taylor, Eberhard Weber and Jon Christensen.

== Reception ==
Professional ratings
Review scores
Source	Rating
AllMusic	4/5 stars
The Penguin Guide to Jazz Recordings	3/4 stars
The Rolling Stone Jazz Record Guide	3/5 stars

The AllMusic review by Scott Yanow states, "Jan Garbarek's icy and haunting tones on tenor and soprano are in the forefront during much of this set."

== Track listing ==
All compositions by Jan Garbarek

1. "Blue Sky" – 6:45
2. "White Cloud" – 9:06
3. "Windows" – 6:46
4. "Red Roof" – 7:49
5. "Wires" – 5:20
6. "The Picture" – 8:03

== Personnel ==
=== Jan Garbarek Group ===
- Jan Garbarek – tenor saxophone, soprano saxophone
- Bill Connors – electric and acoustic guitars
- John Taylor – piano
- Eberhard Weber – bass
- Jon Christensen – drums
