= Places (Jan Garbarek album) =

Studio album by Jan Garbarek
- Released: 1978
- Recorded: December 1977
- Genre: Jazz
- Length: 48:25
- Label: ECM 1118
- Producer: Manfred Eicher

Jan Garbarek chronology
Dis (1977)	Places (1978)	Photo with Blue Sky, White Cloud, Wires, Windows and a Red Roof (1979)

Places is an album by Norwegian saxophonist Jan Garbarek, recorded in December 1977 and released on ECM the following year. The quartet features pianist John Taylor, guitarist Bill Connors, and drummer Jack DeJohnette.

== Reception ==
Professional ratings
Review scores
Source	Rating
AllMusic	3/5 stars
The Penguin Guide to Jazz Recordings	4/4 stars
The Rolling Stone Jazz Record Guide	3/5 stars

The AllMusic review by Scott Yanow states, "A fairly sleepy ECM date ... the music has plenty of space, is introspective, and often emphasizes long tones."

Awarding the album four stars out of four, The Penguin Guide to Jazz Recordings describes it as “a small masterpiece, dominated by one long track.”

== Track listing ==
All compositions by Jan Garbarek.

1. "Reflections" – 15:08
2. "Entering" – 7:56
3. "Going Places" – 14:16
4. "Passing" – 11:18

== Personnel ==
- Jan Garbarek – tenor saxophone, soprano saxophone, alto saxophone
- John Taylor – piano, organ
- Bill Connors – guitar
- Jack DeJohnette – drums
