= Mágico: Carta de Amor =

Live album by Jan Garbarek, Egberto Gismonti & Charlie Haden
- Released: 6 November 2012
- Recorded: April 1981
- Venue: Amerikahaus, München
- Genre: Jazz
- Length: 107:54
- Label: ECM; ECM 2280/81
- Producer: Manfred Eicher

Jan Garbarek chronology
Officium Novum (2010)	Mágico: Carta de Amor (2012)	Sleeper (2012)

Mágico chronology
Folk Songs (1981)	Mágico: Carta de Amor (2012)

Mágico: Carta de Amor (Portuguese for "Magic: Love Letter") is a live album by saxophonist Jan Garbarek, guitarist Egberto Gismonti and bassist Charlie Haden recorded in 1981 and released on ECM three decades later in 2012. The album follows the trio's first two recordings Magico (1979) and Folk Songs (1981).

== Reception ==
Professional ratings
Review scores
Source	Rating
All About Jazz	5/5 stars
AllMusic	4/5 stars
The Guardian	4/5 stars

All About Jazz correspondent John Kelman commented, "Carta de Amor is a reminder of how a particular point in time, when the pan-cultural and cross-genre interests of three artists from vastly different backgrounds and musical upbringings, could come together in rare synchronicity."

The AllMusic review by Thom Jurek awarded the album 4 stars, stating, "Mágico: Carta de Amor is a musical treasure trove that features three players from three continents working in near-symbiotic dialogue, offering music that showcases compositional and improvisational mastery, yet transcends the limitations of genre classification."

The Guardian's John Fordham noted, "It's an impassioned and fiercely improvisational collection of variations on powerful themes by all three, touching on Haden's Liberation Music Orchestra repertoire and Garbarek's free-jazz history."

== Track listing ==
All compositions by Egberto Gismonti except as indicated

Disc One:

1. "Carta de Amor" – 7:25
2. "La Pasionaria" (Charlie Haden) – 16:26
3. "Cego Aderaldo" – 9:50
4. "Folk Song" (Traditional) – 8:09
5. "Don Quixote" – 8:25
6. "Spor" (Jan Garbarek) – 14:01

Disc Two:

1. "Branquinho" – 7:37
2. "All That Is Beautiful" (Haden) – 15:35
3. "Palhaço" – 9:12
4. "Two Folk Songs" (Traditional) – 3:39
5. "Carta de Amor, Var." – 7:35

== Personnel ==
- Jan Garbarek – soprano saxophone, tenor saxophone
- Egberto Gismonti – guitar, piano
- Charlie Haden – bass
