= Legend of the Seven Dreams =

Studio album by Jan Garbarek
- Released: October 1988
- Recorded: July 1988
- Studio: Rainbow Studio; Oslo, Norway
- Genre: Jazz
- Length: 54:45
- Label: ECM; ECM 1381
- Producer: Manfred Eicher

Jan Garbarek chronology
All Those Born With Wings (1987)	Legend of the Seven Dreams (1988)	Rosensfole (1989)

Professional ratings
Review scores
Source	Rating
AllMusic	2.5/5 stars
The Penguin Guide to Jazz Recordings	3/4 stars

Legend of the Seven Dreams is an album by Norwegian jazz saxophonist Jan Garbarek recorded in July 1988 and released on ECM October later that year.

== Reception ==
AllMusic awarded the album two-and-a-half stars, with reviewer Mark W. B. Allender stating, “Though in step with its time, this release suffers from excessive reliance on ambient synthesizers, which litter much of the recording, rendering it only slightly more interesting than many of the Windham Hill new age recordings of the same era. Unfortunate, because the disc opens with strength and gradually peters out by the end.”

== Track listing ==
All compositions by Jan Garbarek.

1. "He Comes from the North (Introduction based on the Sámi joik; Áillohaš)" – 13:37
2. "Aichuri, the Song Man" – 5:03
3. "Tongue of Secrets“ – 8:12
4. "Brother Wind" – 8:07
5. "Its Name Is Secret Road" – 1:48
6. "Send Word" – 7:19
7. "Voy cantando" – 6:55
8. "Mirror Stone 1" – 1:15
9. "Mirror Stone 2" – 2:29

== Personnel ==
- Jan Garbarek – soprano and tenor saxophones, flute
- Rainer Brüninghaus – electronic keyboards
- Eberhard Weber – bass
- Naná Vasconcelos – percussion, voice
