= Nude Ants =

Live album by Keith Jarrett
- Released: May 1980
- Recorded: May 1979
- Venue: Village Vanguard; New York City
- Genre: Jazz
- Length: 1:41:36
- Label: ECM 1171/72
- Producer: Manfred Eicher

Keith Jarrett chronology
Eyes of the Heart (1979)	Nude Ants (1980)	G.I. Gurdjieff: Sacred Hymns (1980)

Keith Jarrett European Quartet chronology
My Song (1978)	Nude Ants (1980)	Personal Mountains (1989)

Nude Ants is a live album by American pianist Keith Jarrett recorded at the Village Vanguard in New York City in May 1979 and released on ECM a year later. The quartet—Jarrett's "European Quartet"—features saxophonist Jan Garbarek and rhythm section Palle Danielsson and Jon Christensen. The title of the album is a play on the phrase "New Dance", which is the title of the penultimate song.

== Reception ==
The AllMusic review by Scott Yanow awarded the album 4½ stars, stating, "The pianist very much dominates the music but Garbarek's unique floating tone on his instruments and the subtle accompaniment by Danielsson and Christensen are also noteworthy."

Professional ratings
Review scores
Source	Rating
Allmusic	4.5/5 stars
The Penguin Guide to Jazz	3/4 stars
The Rolling Stone Jazz Record Guide	3/5 stars
Tom Hull	B+

== Track listing ==
All compositions by Keith Jarrett.

1. "Chant of the Soil" – 17:13
2. "Innocence" – 8:15
3. "Processional" – 20:33
4. "Oasis" – 30:35
5. "New Dance" – 12:57
6. "Sunshine Song" – 12:03

== Personnel ==
=== European Quartet ===
- Keith Jarrett – piano, timbales, percussion
- Jan Garbarek – tenor and soprano saxophones
- Palle Danielsson – bass
- Jon Christensen – drums

=== Production ===
- Manfred Eicher – producer
- Tom McKenney – recording engineer
- Martin Wieland – mixing engineer
- Barbara Wojirsch – cover design and layout
