= Rites (album) =

Studio album by Jan Garbarek
- Released: 5 October 1998
- Recorded: March 1998
- Studio: Rainbow Studio; Oslo, Norway; Tbilisi (track 2-5 only)
- Genre: Jazz
- Length: 98:15
- Label: ECM; ECM 1685/86
- Producer: Manfred Eicher

Jan Garbarek chronology
Visible World (1996)	Rites (1998)	Mnemosyne (1998)

Rites is a double album by Norwegian jazz saxophonist Jan Garbarek recorded in March 1998 and released on ECM later that year.

== Reception ==
The AllMusic review by Thom Jurek stated: "On one collection, listeners get music for prayer, contemplation, and grief, as well as a funky European read of indigenous music for moving to and celebrating. Clearly this is what sets Rites above Garbarek's other recordings, him taking that balance he possessed so early in his career back again and putting it to work in a near-sacred setting."

Professional ratings
Review scores
Source	Rating
AllMusic	4/5 stars
The Penguin Guide to Jazz Recordings	3/4 stars

== Track listing ==
All compositions by Jan Garbarek except as indicated

Disc one

1. "Rites" – 8:29
2. "Where the Rivers Meet" – 7:02
3. "Vast Plain, Clouds" – 5:55
4. "So Mild the Wind, So Meek the Water" – 6:11
5. "Song, Tread Lightly" – 7:45
6. "It's OK to Listen to the Gray Voice" – 6:45
7. "Her Wild Ways" – 6:46

Disc two

1. "It's High Time" – 3:36
2. "One Ying for Every Yang" – 6:36
3. "Pan" – 6:13
4. "We Are the Stars" – 5:03
5. "The Moon over Mtatsminda" (Jansug Kakhidze) – 4:02
6. "Malinye" (Don Cherry) – 6:22
7. "The White Clown" – 3:47
8. "Evenly They Danced" – 5:18
9. "Last Rite" – 8:25

== Personnel ==
- Jan Garbarek – soprano and tenor saxophones, synthesizers, sampler, percussion
- Rainer Brüninghaus – piano (Disc One tracks 4, 6 & 7), keyboards (Disc One tracks 3 & 6, Disc Two tracks 2 & 7)
- Eberhard Weber – bass (Disc One tracks 3, 4, 6, & 7, Disc Two tracks 2 & 7)
- Marilyn Mazur – drums (Disc One tracks 3, 4, 6 & 7, Disc Two tracks 2, 6 & 7), percussion (Disc One tracks 2 & 5)
- Bugge Wesseltoft – synthesizer (tracks 1-1, 2-1, 2-8 & 2-9), accordion (track 2-6)
- Jansug Kakhidze – conductor (track 2-5)
  - Tbilisi Symphony Orchestra
- Torstein Grythe – conductor (track 2-4)
  - Sølvguttene Choir

=== Technical personnel ===
- Manfred Eicher – producer
- Jan Erik Kongshaug – engineer (except track 2-5)
- Mikhail Kilosanidze – recording (track 2-5)
- Sascha Kleis – cover design
- Giya Chkhatarashvili, Gérald Minkoff, Jim Bengston, Muriel Olesen, Silvia Lelli – photography
- Jan Garbarek – liner notes
