= Officium =

Officium may refer to:

== Religion ==
- Officium Divinum (or Divinum Officium), the official set of daily prayers prescribed by the Roman Catholic Church
- Sanctum Officium, the department in the Roman Curia which oversaw Catholic doctrine

== Music ==
- Officium Defunctorum, a musical setting of the Office of the Dead, composed by the Spanish Renaissance composer Tomás Luis de Victoria in 1603
- Officium (album), a 1994 album by Norwegian saxophonist Jan Garbarek, featuring the Hilliard Ensemble
- Officium Triste, a doom metal band from Rotterdam, The Netherlands

== Other uses ==
- Officium (Ancient Rome), a Latin word with various meanings, including "service", "(sense of) duty", "courtesy", and "ceremony"
