= Bill Connors =

American jazz guitarist (born 1949)

- Born: September 24, 1949 (age 76); Los Angeles, California, U.S.
- Genres: Jazz, jazz fusion
- Occupation: Musician
- Instrument: Guitar
- Years active: 1973–present
- Labels: ECM, Pathfinder Records, Tone Center

Bill Connors (born September 24, 1949) is an American jazz guitarist who was a member of Chick Corea's band Return to Forever. After leaving Return to Forever, he recorded three acoustic albums and then four electric albums as a leader/soloist.

== Early years ==
Connors was born in Los Angeles, California, and began to play the guitar at the age of 14. After three years of extensive self-study of the rock and blues influences that were his first inspiration, he began to play gigs around the Los Angeles area with a heavy blues/rock group called Middle Earth. He found his way to jazz, the music that would lead to a lifelong commitment.

"I'd been playing for about four years", he explained at the time of his RTF tenure, "and suddenly had an overnight change. I didn't want to be a blues guitarist anymore. I began listening to people like Bill Evans, Jim Hall, Wes Montgomery, [bassist] Scott LaFaro, Miles Davis, [John] Coltrane—anyone who had a 'jazz' label. Django Reinhardt really got to me. The first time I heard one of his records, I thought that was just what I wanted to be. He had all the fire, creativity, and energy that rock players have today. And the amazing purity of his melodies—you just knew they came from a totally instinctive place."

He and Reinhardt differed however over the matter of electronics with Connors preferring the sound of the electric instrument. "I always wanted to use the electric guitar in a sophisticated context, like with Chick [Corea]. I like to play jazz with that electric-rock sound. For me it's a lot closer to a horn than the traditional guitar, and that's what I love about it; I can sustain notes, get into different kinds of phrasing—do things other instruments do naturally, only the guitar does it with the aid of technology."

Connors moved to San Francisco in 1972 to join the Mike Nock Group (formerly known as The Fourth Way) with drummer Eddie Marshall and bassist Dennis Parker. He met up with drummer and vibraphonist Glenn Cronkhite, who introduced him to a greater knowledge of jazz. Connors also played with bassist Steve Swallow and pianist Art Lande.

== Return to Forever ==
In 1973, after sitting in on a gig, Connors joined Return to Forever, Chick Corea's fusion band that included bassist Stanley Clarke and drummer Steve Gadd.

"A miracle!" Bill claims. "Chick was my hero. I wanted to be Chick Corea on guitar. I didn't know him, but whenever I really wanted to get off on music I'd play some of his piano solos and Return to Forever songs. I heard that Chick was looking for a guitarist. Steve encouraged me to call Chick, and though I was very nervous, I did, and he invited me to come over to the club where he was working and sit in. I was so scared that I almost turned him down. But after running around and saying to everyone, 'Guess who I'm going to play with tonight,' and everyone telling everyone else, all this energy was formulating – and I took to my room and practiced my ass off."

That night the fear disappeared. "The minute I got up on stage I had this feeling like I'd been preparing for this all my life. I was so relaxed that I felt as though I was in my own living room. Chick and I played musical games – he'd play these real simple lines and I'd be giving my interpretations of them, then go off into the Chick Corea 'outness.' I ended up in New York two weeks later."

With Corea's band of Stanley Clarke and drummer Lenny White, Connors established himself on the national and international music scenes, touring in Japan and Europe, and recording the album Hymn of the Seventh Galaxy (1973).

In April 1974, after the band's tour of Europe and Japan, Connors quit the group. The musical direction seemed to him to be changing from what it was when he had joined. He explains, "Everything started getting less aesthetic, more rock. Just too much like Mahavishnu. I was having trouble expressing myself the way I wanted to in that context."

Connor's disenchantment with the group also stemmed from certain objections to Corea's Scientology-inspired leadership style. "Chick had a lot of ideas that were part of his involvement with Scientology. He got more demanding, and I wasn't allowed to control my own solos. I had no power in the music at all. Then, we'd receive written forms about what clothes we could wear, and graphic charts where we had to rate ourselves every night – not by our standards, but his. Finally, we had to connect dots on a chart every night. I took all of it seriously because I had a lot of respect for Chick, but eventually I just felt screwed around. In the end, my only power was to quit."

== After Return to Forever ==
In 1974, Connors left Return to Forever, and began to explore the New York jazz and session scene, performing with guitarist John Abercrombie and keyboardist Jan Hammer, and recording with former Return to Forever bandmate Stanley Clarke. "It was great," he stated in a 1985 interview, "because it wasn't this contrived thing in order to communicate to the audience. We were *playing* again and *learning* again, and it felt real good."

During this period, recording with vocalist Gene McDaniels and Stanley Clarke kept the guitarist's creative impulses occupied with a variety of challenges—but not for long. "Around 1975, I'd decided to become a classical guitar player", he muses. "I did my first solo album in 1974, and just decided on the spur of the moment to do it all on acoustic. That was just such a contrast from blowing people's ears off with my 200-watt Marshall that it really started to capture me." A further impetus came with Connors' discovery of classical artist Julian Bream. "I was sitting with his album 20th Century Guitar—a real classic—and it has this piece by [German composer] Henze that I really loved. It was just getting to me, so I sat down for a couple of days and transcribed it—on my steel-string guitar, with my funny pick-and-finger technique [laughs]. When I got it, it gave me so much pleasure that I said, 'Okay, I'm going to be a classical guitar player.' And that's what happened."

Connors recorded his solo album Theme to the Gaurdian (ECM) in 1974, making the switch from electric to acoustic guitar. Simultaneously he began to study classical guitarists. Two more albums on acoustic guitar followed: Of Mist and Melting (1978, ECM) with saxophonist Jan Garbarek, bassist Gary Peacock, and drummer Jack DeJohnette and Swimming with a Hole in My Body (1980, ECM). During 1976 and 1977, Connors recorded with Lee Konitz, Paul Bley, and Jimmy Giuffre in New York City. He toured Europe, performing with Luciano Berio and Cathy Berberian. He returned to electric guitar, performing and recording with Garbarek on Places (1978) and Photo with Blue Sky, White Cloud, Wires, Windows and a Red Roof (1979) and with Tom van der Geld and Richard Jannotta on Path (ECM) in 1979. In 1984, Connors recorded Step It with Tom Kennedy on bass, Dave Weckl on drums and Steve Khan on guitar (on "Twinkle" track only). His next album, Double Up (1986), included bassist Kennedy and drummer Kim Plainfield. The same trio (Connors, Kennedy, Plainfield) recorded Assembler in 1987. After a gap of almost two decades, his next album Return was recorded in 2004.

Connors has been giving private lessons while continuing his studies. He plays plectrum style on a classical jazz guitar and a Gibson L-5 CES archtop electric. Other guitars are a Gibson Les Paul Custom and an Ovation guitar (electro-acoustic model).

== Discography ==
=== As leader ===
- Theme to the Gaurdian (ECM, 1975)
- Of Mist and Melting (ECM, 1978)
- Swimming with a Hole in My Body (ECM, 1980)
- Step It (Pathfinder, 1984)
- Double Up (Pathfinder, 1986)
- Assembler (Pathfinder, 1987)
- Return (Tone Center, 2004)

=== As sideman ===
- Return to Forever, Hymn of the Seventh Galaxy (Polydor, 1973)
- Julian Priester, Love, Love (ECM, 1974)
- Stanley Clarke, Stanley Clarke (Nemperor, 1974)
- Paul Bley, Quiet Song (Improvising Artists, 1974)
- Jan Garbarek, Places (ECM, 1977)
- Jan Garbarek, Photo with Blue Sky, White Cloud, Wires, Windows and a Red Roof (ECM, 1978)
- Tom van der Geld, Path (ECM, 1979)
- Kim Plainfield & Lincoln Goines, Night and Day (Metalimbo, 2002)
- Corea, Clarke & White, Forever (Concord, 2011)
