= Kashkashian =

Kashkashian may refer to:

- Kim Kashkashian, American violist
- 8994 Kashkashian, an asteroid named after Kim Kashkashian
