= All Those Born with Wings =

Studio album by Jan Garbarek
- Released: February 1987
- Recorded: August 1986
- Studio: Rainbow Studio; Oslo, Norway
- Genre: Jazz
- Length: 43:15
- Label: ECM; ECM 1324
- Producer: Manfred Eicher

Jan Garbarek chronology
It's OK to Listen to the Gray Voice (1985)	All Those Born with Wings (1987)	Legend of the Seven Dreams (1988)

All Those Born with Wings is a solo album by Norwegian saxophonist Jan Garbarek, recorded in August 1986 and released on ECM the following year.

== Reception ==
Professional ratings
Review scores
Source	Rating
AllMusic	3/5 stars
The Penguin Guide to Jazz Recordings	2/4 stars

AllMusic awarded the album with 3 stars, with reviewer Mark W. B. Allender stating, "On the hip with most of Garbarek's recordings, this one is airy and spacy—belting out screaming sax lines. The five pieces here—serially titled—tend to blend together, giving the impression of one long song."

== Track listing ==
All compositions by Jan Garbarek.

1. "1st Piece" – 6:09
2. "2nd Piece" – 4:51
3. "3rd Piece" (in memory of Andrej Tarkovskij) – 7:38
4. "4th Piece" – 6:34
5. "5th Piece" – 12:54
6. "6th Piece" – 5:09

== Personnel ==
- Jan Garbarek – saxophones, keyboards, guitar, percussion, voice and other instruments

=== Technical personnel ===
- Manfred Eicher – producer
- Jan Erik Kongshaug – engineer
- Barbara Wojirsch – cover design
- Steinar Berger – cover photos
- Sam Haskins – photography
