= Rogers Covey-Crump =

UK singer of early music

- Born: 1944 (age 80–81); St Albans, Hertfordshire, England
- Genres: Early music; Contemporary classical music
- Years active: 1967–present
- Formerly of: Hilliard Ensemble; Gothic Voices; Taverner Consort; Deller Consort; Consort of Musicke; Early Music Consort of London; King's Consort

Rogers Henry Lewis Covey-Crump (born 1944) is an English tenor noted for his performances in both early music and contemporary classical music. He has sometimes been identified as an haute-contre tenor. He has performed for over 50 years in choirs and ensembles such as the Hilliard Ensemble, and as a soloist. He has been especially in demand for the part of the Evangelist in Bach's St Matthew Passion and St John Passion. He also specialises in vocal tuning, and has written articles on the subject.

== Background ==
Covey-Crump's paternal grandfather was Canon Walter William Covey-Crump. (Note: Rogers Covey-Crump is the grandson of Walter William Covey-Crump, via W.W. Covey-Crump's son, musician Lewis Charles Leslie Covey-Crump (1904–1962). GRO Births Jun 1904 Covey-Crump Lewis C. L. (mother Hilda Sophia nee Porter) Luton 3b 395. Marriages Jun 1930 Covey-Crump Lewis C. L. (wife Joyce Edwards) St Albans 3a 2293. Births Mar 1944 Covey-Crump Rogers H. L. (mother Joyce Edwards) St. Albans 3a 2086.) His uncle was Commander A. T. L. Covey-Crump. (Note: Walter William Covey-Crump (1865–1949)) His father Lewis Charles Leslie Covey-Crump was a musician, and his mother Joyce (née Edwards) was a violinist. He was born in St Albans, Hertfordshire, in 1944.

Covey-Crump's unusual name has sometimes been misremembered; for example as "Corey-Grunt" or Covery-Crumb". Operatic bass Brian Bannatyne-Scott has described ...

... my dear friend and colleague from the Hilliard Ensemble, Rogers Covey-Crump. Apart from having the most wonderful name in classical music and being the only person I have ever heard of called Rogers and whose name has given rise to some of the best misprints (I cite Rogers Covey (Crump-Tenor) and Rogers Covey-Crunt), he has been a doyen of early music singing for over four decades, and must be, probably, the most recorded tenor in recording history, possessed of a mellifluous light voice, perfect for ensemble and solo singing alike.

=== Education and training ===
Covey-Crump was a boy chorister in the chapel choir of New College, Oxford. The college has a prep school where he learned recorder and piano. At the Royal College of Music he studied organ under John Birch, voice with Ruth Packer and Wilfred Brown, and degree-level theory. He graduated from London University as a Bachelor of Music, gaining prizes and diplomas in organ-playing.

=== Vocal quality ===
Covey-Crump has the natural range of a tenor but has had to develop a high-lying tessitura to accommodate the requirements of certain early music pieces. However the Phoenix Choir, Eastbourne, says:

Rogers is a tenor haute-contre, a natural voice in a high range without falsetto, (Note: This is a misunderstanding; Covey-Crump is not a natural haute-contre, but a tenor who has extended his range due to vocal training, to accommodate certain performance requirements) while still retaining the characteristic ring of a true tenor. His accurate pitch and ability to adapt to different temperaments is a major factor in his outstanding career.

Wells Cathedral Oratorio Society says, "[Covey-Crump's] example has led to a revival in singing certain music by tenors". George Pratt writes, "[Covey-Crump] has made a major contribution in reinstating the high tenor voice in music often thought accessible only to falsettists, notably in the recordings for Hyperion of the complete odes and church music of Purcell".

== Career ==
=== Overview of choral and ensemble performance ===
In the 1970s Covey-Crump sang Anglican church music as a tenor lay clerk in St Albans Cathedral Choir, while becoming increasingly well-known for his concert work. He was one of the singers in David Munrow's Early Music Consort of London (which was active between 1967 and 1976) and over the years joined many other vocal ensembles, mainly but not always specialising in early music. When Gregory Rose's group Singcircle premiered and recorded the 1977 version of Stockhausen's Stimmung, Covey-Crump was part of that ensemble.

Ensembles with which he has been associated include the Hilliard Ensemble (although he was not a founder member), Gothic Voices (of which he was a founder member in 1981), the Taverner Consort, Deller Consort, Landini Consort, Medieval Ensemble of London, Consort of Musicke and Baccholian Singers, besides the Folger Consort of Washington, D.C., and the King's Consort. Hyperion recorded much of his ensemble work. Covey-Crump took part in the ensemble Windsor Box & Fir Company, which was founded in 1994 and included Jenny Thomas on flute and recorder and Ian Gammie on guitar. They performed in many places, including the National Portrait Gallery, the V & A and Kensington Palace besides appearances on BBC Radio, Channel 4 and BBC One.

Following the closure of the Hilliard Ensemble, John Potter, Christopher O'Gorman and Covey-Crump started the Conductus Project, an academic project which included performance of the conductus, and workshops on performance. The project toured Brighton, England, Radovljica, Slovenia, Brussels, Belgium, Durham and Beverley, England, and Bratislava, Slovakia.

He has also taken part in ensembles as a continuo player, and has given master classes for choral scholars at Merton College, Oxford.

=== Hilliard Ensemble ===
Covey-Crump had a long association with the Hilliard Ensemble, although he was not a founder member. With the Hilliard Ensemble he sang "ancient and modern, secular and religious" music besides early music and new compositions, although the ensemble's vocal range precluded performance of many of the Classical and Romantic works. The ensemble did not prioritise the sartorial aspect of its image; the performers have been "described as looking like four used-car salesmen, or even four funeral directors on one occasion". Besides normal concert performances, in 2008 Covey-Crump took part in the Edinburgh Festival performance of I Went to the House But Did Not Enter in collaboration with experimental composer Heiner Goebbels, and in the subsequent performances in Europe, US and Korea. Covey-Crump took part in the ensemble's "annual schedule of up to one hundred concerts", its Festival in Cambridge, and its Summer School which moved to Germany in 2000. Thereafter, he was recording with the Hilliard Ensemble for the German recording ECM instead of Hyperion, Harmonia Mundi and EMI. He was involved in the ensemble's collaborations with Jan Garbarek (Officium, 1994) which spawned many live performances over 20 years. He also collaborated with Arvo Pärt, and took part in the group's Hilliard Live recordings of concerts. The ensemble which, besides Covey-Crump, included David James (counter-tenor), Gordon Jones (bass) and Steven Harrold (tenor), retired in December 2014 after a forty-one-year run, during which Covey-Crump had been a member for the group's last thirty years.

=== Solo performance ===
Covey-Crump is an "internationally renowned Bach soloist". His solo performances, of more than half a century, cover lute songs, early Classical, Baroque and Contemporary works. He has worked extensively and worldwide as a soloist, in the US, Canada, Finland, Sweden, Spain, Germany, France, the Netherlands and the United Kingdom. He has performed as "an accomplished" Evangelist in the Bach Passions, for which he has been in demand, in the Good Friday performances at St George, Hanover Square. His inclusion in the Hanover Square Bach Passions became an annual tradition. He has performed Bach's Passions at the BBC Proms where he was also a soloist in a Purcell concert with the King's Consort in 1995. He has performed the works of Bach at the Symphony Hall, Birmingham, King's College, Cambridge, and Eton College, the Christmas Oratorio with the Amsterdam Bach Soloists in the Netherlands, and the St John Passion at the Three Choirs Festival at Hereford Cathedral, besides the cantatas alongside the Orchestra of the Age of Enlightenment, with whom he also performed in Haydn's The Creation. He has performed the works of Henry Purcell many times, being in demand for his high tenor voice, including at the BBC Proms, where he has also performed works of Monteverdi. He performed in the Messiah at the Queen Elizabeth Hall. He has performed at the Gloucester Three Choirs Festival.

The following is a small selection of Covey-Crump's solo performances. On 5 June 1970, he sang Schütz's Was hast du verwirket, SWV 307, "with a nice sense of tone and rhythm" at St Mary's Church, Chesham, as part of a Music for a While recital with several other singers, plus organ, piano and cello. He took part in St Albans International Organ Festival in 1975, and again in 1977 when he assumed 17th-century costume and performed in a cabaret entitled Pepys Night. On 3 March 1979, Covey-Crump was soloist with the Tilford Bach Choir and Orchestra in a performance of Bach's St John Passion at the Queen Elizabeth Hall. On 23 March 1996 he was soloist in Bach's St Matthew Passion with the Derby Bach Choir and the Baroque orchestra Musica Donum Dei at Derby Cathedral. At Christmas 2009 he was a soloist in Bach's Christmas Oratorio at St Alban's Abbey. In 2018 he was soloist at Terence Charlston's organ recital at St Mary-le-Bow.

Covey-Crump has performed solo at premieres of some contemporary works, and has recorded compositions by Geoffrey Burgon.

== Reviews ==
- Bach St Matthew Passion (Vanguard 99068/70 DDD). "The role of the Evangelist, crucial to Bach’s Passions on a number of levels, is sensitively realised, lightly and with clarity of diction by Rogers Covey-Crump." Nicholas Anderson 20 January 2012, Classical Music.
- "Covey-Crump is known as one of the leading Evangelists in the Passions". Wells Cathedral Oratorio Society, 2014.
- Conductus 3: Music & Poetry from 13th century France (Hyperion CDA68115). "That sound [of the Conductus Ensemble] is particularly attractive coming from tenors John Potter, Christopher O’Gorman and Rogers Covey-Crump who, separately and together, produce a well-modulated and exquisitely toned sound". Andrew Benson-Wilson, 29 February 2016. "Three tenors – John Potter, Christopher O’Gorman and Rogers Covey-Crump – deliver these explorations with unerring skill and conviction". Andrew Pinnock, Southampton University, 2016. "Covey-Crump in Stephani sollempnia [track 12] has no need to anchor events as the almost giddy paean of joy rolls out. It's given just enough air to work a kind of magic which – strangely – succeeds by retaining some of the mystery of St Stephen's Day". Mark Sealey, Music Web International.
- Monteverdi's Vespro della Beata Vergine at Keble College Chapel. "Rogers Covey-Crump was somewhat tremulous and insecure as the third vocal part of [the Sanctus], as also in the cleverly echoed words of Audi, coelum, for which he was stationed behind the audience, back at the entrance to the Chapel." Curtis Rogers, 26 February 2019.
- "[Covey-Crump has been] "renowned as Evangelist in the great Bach Passion settings for nearly half a century". The Villages Music Festival, 2022.
- Purcell Complete Anthems & Services, Vol.2, with King's Consort. "[in the Te Deum and Jubilate Deo] Rogers Covey-Crump's light, incisive voice, though not granted any real limelight, is well-suited to this music". Lindsay Kemp (undated), Gramophone.

== Other interests ==
=== Vocal tuning ===
Covey-Crump's interest in tuning stems from his early days as an organist. During his career, he has become involved in the subject of musical tuning in various eras and styles of early vocal music.

George Pratt writes in Grove's Dictionary: "[Covey-Crump's] keen interest in vocal tuning and historical temperaments, refreshingly audible in his performances, has generated several writings from him on the subject". In connection with vocal tuning, Covey-Crump has run choral workshops for amateurs and professionals, and has given lectures.

== Publications ==
- Covey-Crump, Rogers (1 May 1992). Knighton, Tess; Fallows, David (eds.). "Pythagoras at the Forge: Tuning in Early Music" in Companion to Medieval and Renaissance Music. London: Oxford University Press/J.M. Dent. pp. 317–326. ISBN 978-0460046275. and ISBN 0460046276.
- Covey-Crump, Rogers (26 November 1992). Paynter, John (ed.). "Vocal Consort Style and Tunings" in Companion to Contemporary Musical Thought. London: Routledge. pp. 1020–1050. ISBN 978-0415019903. and ISBN 0-415-07225-5.
- Hilliard Live recording; sleeve notes.

== Discography ==
=== Choir and ensemble recordings ===
Covey-Crump has recorded worldwide. Some of his earliest recordings as a tenor soloist were with David Munrow and his Early Music Consort of London, in 1975. Two of those 1975 Early Music Consort albums were re-released as CDs in 2003, when a Sunday Tribune reviewer described Covey-Crump as an "outstanding name".

=== Recordings as a soloist ===
- Bach, St John Passion, BWV 245, singing St John the Evangelist and some arias with Andrew Parrott (EMI).
- Bach, Mass in B minor, BWV 232, with Andrew Parrott (EMI).
- Bach, St Matthew Passion, BWV 244, singing John the Evangelist with Roy Goodman and the Choir of King's College, Cambridge, 1995, (Vanguard).
- Bach reconstruction of St Mark Passion, BWV 247, by Simon Heighes, with Roy Goodman and the European Union Baroque Orchestra. This album was broadcast on BBC Radio 3 on 24 December 2005 at midday as part of its Bach Christmas event.
- Bach, with Simon Preston and Christopher Hogwood (Decca).
- Blow, with the Parley of Instruments and St Paul's Cathedral Choir, dir. John Scott.
- Boyce, with the Parley of Instruments and St Paul's Cathedral Choir, dir. John Scott.
- Byrd, Second Service & Consort Anthems, with Fretwork and the Choir of Magdalen College, Oxford, 2007.
- Dowland, First Book of Airs with Jakob Lindberg (BIS).
- Dufay, secular songs (Hyperion).
- Handel, with Simon Preston and Christopher Hogwood (Decca).
- Handel, with the Parley of Instruments and St Paul's Cathedral Choir, with John Scott.
- Haydn, with Preston and Hogwood (Decca).
- Monteverdi, sacred music with the King's Consort (Hyperion).
- Mozart, with Stephen Cleobury (Argo).
- Mozart, with Cleobury (Decca).
- Ockhegem, secular songs (Hyperion).
- Purcell, with Preston and Hogwood (Decca).
- Purcell, with John Eliot Gardiner (Erato).
- Purcell, church music, odes, solo songs with the King's Consort (Hyperion).
- Ancient Airs and Dances, lute songs with Paul O'Dette (Hyperion).
- Begone Dull Care, with the Windsor Box & Fir Co, 2009 (Danubia Discs).
- Goethe and the Guitar, with Café Mozart (Danubia Discs).
- Haydn and the Earl of Abingdon, with Café Mozart, 2008 (Naxos), plus three other recordings of 18th-century song with Café Mozart (Hyperion).
- Shakespeare settings, with the Folger Consort of Washington, D.C.
