= Kim Plainfield =

American drummer

- Born: March 24, 1954; Berkeley, California, U.S.
- Died: April 8, 2017 (aged 63) Tomkins Cove, New York, U.S.
- Genres: Jazz fusion
- Occupation: Musician
- Instrument: Drums
- Website: kimplainfield.com

Kim Plainfield (March 24, 1954 – April 8, 2017) was an American jazz fusion drummer and author who has performed with Bill Connors and Pointer Sisters, among others.

== Biography ==
Born in the San Francisco Bay area, Kim moved from there to New York City in 1977, where he started his musical career with numerous show and studio recordings.

Kim taught private lessons and classes at Drummers Collective in NYC from 1979 until his passing. During much of that time, he held the title of faculty chairman.

From 2002 on, Kim was also an associate professor of drums and percussion at Berklee College of Music.

Several times a year he held workshops and lessons in Europe, e.g. in Switzerland and the Czech Republic.

== Discography ==
Plainfield appeared as a studio musician in countless productions, such as w/ Pat Thrall, Adam Holzman, Mino Cinelu and Edgar Winter. Moreover, he released his own music.

- Night and Day (2005) Mis (w/ Lincoln Goines, Jon Lucien, Bill O’Connell, Alex Foster, Didier Lockwood, Myra Casales, Dan Carillo, Bill Connors, Adam Holzman and Pat Thrall)
- Jacob’s Ladder (2011) ESC (w/ Sheryl Bailey, Bill O’Connell (Piano) and Lincoln Goines)

== Books ==
Advanced Concepts - A Comprehensive Method for Developing Technique, Contemporary Styles and Rhythmical Concepts
