= Kim Kashkashian =

American violinist (born 1952)

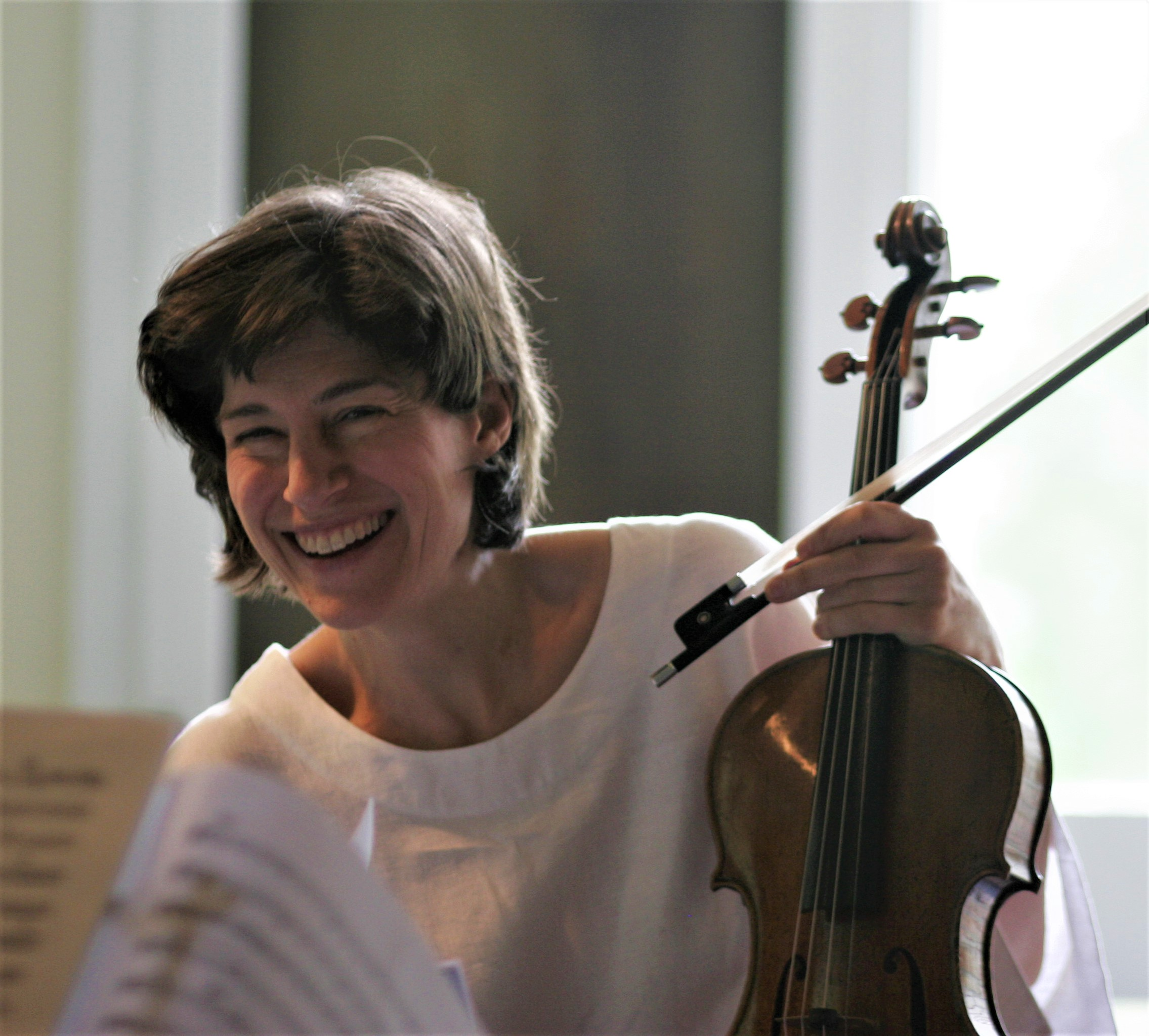
- Kashkashian in 2008

Background information
- Born: August 31, 1952 (age 74); Detroit, Michigan, US
- Genre: Classical music
- Occupations: Musician, educator
- Instrument: Viola

Kim Kashkashian (born August 31, 1952) is an American violist. She has spent her career in the U.S. and Europe and collaborated with many major contemporary composers. In 2013 she won a Grammy Award for Best Classical Instrumental Solo. She is recognized as one of the world's top violists.

== Early life and education ==
Kashkashian was born to Armenian-American parents on August 31, 1952, in Detroit, Michigan. She grew up in Detroit in what Mark Slobin has described as an "only modestly Armenian household." Her father had a baritone voice and sang Armenian folk songs, which influenced her. She began playing the violin at the age of eight. She first studied with Ara Zerounian, then continued her music education and switched to viola at the Interlochen Arts Academy beginning from the age 12. She studied at the Peabody Conservatory of Music in Baltimore with Walter Trampler (1969–70) and Karen Tuttle (1970–75). She received her Bachelor of Music (B.M.) degree from the Peabody Conservatory and her Master of Music (M.M.) degree from the New School of Music, Philadelphia. She was also the mentee of Felix Galimir.

== Teaching career ==
Kashkashian has been a faculty member at several institutions. In 1981–86 she taught at the New School of Music, Philadelphia, in 1983–86 at the Mannes School of Music in New York, in 1985–87 the Indiana University School of Music in Bloomington. She then moved to Germany, where she began teaching at the Hochschule für Musik in Freiburg im Breisgau in 1989 and the Hanns Eisler Hochschule für Musik in Berlin.

She returned to the United States in 2000 and began teaching viola and chamber music at New England Conservatory in Boston in fall 2000.

== Career ==
Throughout her career, Kashkashian has recorded many discs both as a solo and chamber music artist. She has been described as a "staunch proponent" of contemporary classical music. She has collaborated with and commissioned works from Gidon Kremer, Yo-Yo Ma, Robert Levin, Felix Galimir, and the Guarneri String Quartet, György Kurtág, Krzysztof Penderecki, Alfred Schnittke, Giya Kancheli, Arvo Pärt, Peter Eötvös, Ken Ueno, Thomas Larcher, Lera Auerbach, Tigran Mansurian.

She has collaborated with ECM Records since 1985. The ECM website notes that she is "one of the pre-eminent artists of ECM New Series."

Kashkashian has performed at the Metropolitan Museum of New York, Kaufmann Hall, New England Conservatory's Jordan Hall; other cities in the US, Europe and Japan. She regularly participates in the Ravina, Verbier, Salzburg, Lockenhaus and Marlboro festivals. In a 2000 interview she noted that a "violist has far more opportunities for solo playing in Europe than in America." She noted that the viola is fully accepted and respected as a solo instrument, while in America it is "just beginning to be reluctantly respected."

== Awards ==
- Best Classical Album, Armenian Music Awards (2004)

== Personal life ==
Kashkashian has a daughter. In 1996 she moved from Freiburg to Berlin as she wanted her daughter to attend Berlin's only American school.

She practices Chinese martial arts (kung fu), including Tai chi. Her favorite musician of all time is Maria Callas, while her favorite composers include Schubert, Bach, and György Kurtág. She described Kurtág as "present-day Bach." She has named the Schubert trios and any of Bach's works as her favorite musical work.

In a 2013 interview with Hollywood.com, Kashkashian stated that she is constantly confused with reality television personality Kim Kardashian due to their similarly spelled surnames.

Kashkashian is one of the founders and (as of 2016) the Artistic Director of Music for Food, an initiative aimed at fighting hunger.

She first visited Armenia, her ancestral homeland, in 1989. She has collaborated with the famed Armenian composer Tigran Mansurian.

== Recognition ==
Kashkashian is widely recognized as one of the world's top violists. BBC Music Magazine wrote in 1997 that she is one of the "most sought-after violists for chamber music in America." NPR's All Things Considered noted in 2007 that she is "one of only a few violists with an international solo career." The New England Conservatory of Music website describes her as "internationally recognized as a unique voice on the viola." The American Academy of Arts and Sciences described her as a "world renowned musician who has caused the repertoire for the viola to be greatly enlarged" through her many collaborations.

A minor planet discovered by Brian A. Skiff at the Anderson Mesa Station on November 6, 1980, is named after Kashkashian.

=== Honors and accolades ===
- Lionel Tertis International Viola Competition 2nd prize, 1980
- ARD International Music Competition, 3rd prize, 1980
- Edison Prize, 1999 (recording of the Brahms Sonatas with Robert Levin)
- Cannes Classical Award, 2001 for a premiere recording by soloist with orchestra (June 2000 recording of concertos by Bartók, Eötvös and Kurtág)
- George Peabody Medal for Outstanding Contributions to Music in America, 2013
- Elected a Fellow of the American Academy of Arts and Sciences, 2016

==== Grammy Award ====
Kashkashian has received three nominations and has won one Grammy Award.

Year	Award	Recording	Result
1989	Best Chamber Music Performance	Hindemith: Viola Sonatas (Album)	Nominated
1999	Best Chamber Music Performance	Brahms: Sonatas For Viola And Piano Nos. 1 And 2 (Album)	Nominated
2005	Best Instrumental Soloist(s) Performance (with orchestra)	Mansurian: "...And Then I Was In Time Again"	Nominated
2013	Best Classical Instrumental Solo	Kurtág & Ligeti: Music For Viola	Won

== Discography ==
A partial list of her recordings includes:

- Asturiana. Transcribed songs of Manuel de Falla, Alberto Ginastera, Xavier Montsalvatge, Carlos Guastavino, and Carlos López Buchardo. Kim Kashkashian, viola, Robert Levin, piano. (CD ECM 1975)
- Johann Sebastian Bach: 3 Sonatas for Viola da gamba and Cembalo. Kim Kashkashian, viola, Keith Jarrett, cembalo. (CD ECM 1501)
- Béla Bartók: Viola Concerto. Kim Kashkashian, viola, Péter Eötvös, conductor. Netherlands Radio Chamber Orchestra. (CD ECM 1711)
- Luciano Berio: Voci, Naturale. Kim Kashkashian, viola, Robyn Schulkowsky, percussion, Luciano Berio, conductor. (CD ECM 1735)
- Harold Blumenfeld: Voyages after Hart Crane (1977). Patrick Mason, baritone, Kim Kashkashian, viola, David Starobin, guitar, Gordon Gottlieb, Louis Oddo, percussion, Arthur Weisberg, conductor. (LP CRI SD 387)
- Linda Bouchard: Pourtinade. Kim Kashkashian, viola, Robyn Schulkowsky, percussion. (CD ECM 1425)
- Johannes Brahms: Sonatas for Viola and Piano, Op. 120. Kim Kashkashian, viola, Robert Levin, piano. (CD ECM 1630)
- Benjamin Britten: Lachrymae, Op. 48. Kim Kashkashian, viola Robert Levin, piano. (CD ECM 1316)
- Benjamin Britten: Lachrymae, Op. 48a. Kim Kashkashian, viola, Dennis Russell Davies, conductor, Stuttgarter Kammerorchester. (CD ECM 1506)
- Elliott Carter: Elegy for Viola and Piano. Kim Kashkashian, viola Robert Levin, piano. (CD ECM 1316)
- Paul Chihara: Redwood. Kim Kashkashian, viola. Robyn Schulkowsky, percussion. (CD ECM 1425)
- Péter Eötvös: Replica for Viola and Orchestra. Kim Kashkashian, viola, Péter Eötvös, conductor, Netherlands Radio Chamber Orchestra. (CD ECM 1711)
- Gabriel Fauré: Piano Quartet No. 1 in c minor, Op. 15. Beaux Arts Trio, Kim Kashkashian, viola. (CD Philips 422 350–2)
- Alexander Glazunov: Elegie for Viola and Piano, Op. 44. Kim Kashkashian, viola Robert Levin, piano. (CD ECM 1316)
- Paul Hindemith: Trauermusik. Kim Kashkashian, viola, Dennis Russell Davies, conductor, Stuttgarter Kammerorchester. (CD ECM 1506)
- Paul Hindemith: Viola Sonatas Opp. 31 No. 4, 25 No. 1, 1937, 11 No. 4, 11 No. 5, 25 No. 4, 1939. Kim Kashkashian, viola, Robert Levin, piano. (CD ECM 1330)
- Sándor Jemnitz: Trio for violin, viola and guitar, Op. 33. Benjamin Hudson, violin, Kim Kashkashian, viola, David Starobin, guitar. (CD Bridge 9004 or 9292)
- Giya Kancheli: Abii ne viderem. Kim Kashkashian, viola, Vasiko Tevdorashvili, voice, Natalia Pschenitschnikova, alto flute. Dennis Russell Davies, conductor, Stuttgarter Kammerorchester. (CD ECM 1510)
- Giya Kancheli: Vom Winde beweint (Mourned by the Wind). Kim Kashkashian, viola, Dennis Russell Davies, conductor, Orchester der Beethovenhalle Bonn. (CD ECM 1471)
- Eleni Karaindrou: Ulysses' Gaze, film score. Kim Kashkashian, viola. (CD ECM 1570)
- Zoltán Kodály: Adagio for Viola and Piano. Kim Kashkashian, viola, Robert Levin, piano. (CD ECM 1316)
- György Kurtág: Neun Stücke, Jelek, Op. 5, Hommage à R. Sch., Op. 15d. Kim Kashkashian, viola, Robert Levin, piano, Eduard Brunner, clarinet. (CD ECM 1508)
- György Kurtág: Movement for viola and orchestra. Kim Kashkashian, viola, Péter Eötvös, conductor, Netherlands Radio Chamber Orchestra. (CD ECM 1711)
- Franz Liszt: Romance oubliée. Kim Kashkashian, viola Robert Levin, piano. (CD ECM 1316)
- Tigran Mansurian: "...and then I was in time again", Lachrymae, Confessing with Faith. Kim Kashkashian, viola, Jan Garbarek, soprano saxophone, the Hilliard Ensemble, Christoph Poppen, conductor, Münchener Kammerorchester. (CD ECM 1850)
- Tigran Mansurian: Hayren, Music of Komitas and Mansurian, Duet for viola and percussion. Kim Kashkashian, viola, Robyn Schulkowsky, percussion, Tigran Mansurian, piano, voice. (CD ECM 1754)
- Wolfgang Amadeus Mozart: Adagio and Fugue in c minor, K546. Gidon Kremer, Daniel Phillips, violins, Kim Kashkashian, viola, Yo-Yo Ma, cello. (CD Sony MK42134)
- Wolfgang Amadeus Mozart: Duos for Violin and Viola, K423, K424, Trio for Violin, Viola and Piano K498 “Kegelstatt”. Gidon Kremer, violin, Kim Kashkashian, viola, Valery Afanassiev, piano. (CD DG 415 483–2)
- Wolfgang Amadeus Mozart: Sinfonia Concertante for Violin, Viola, and Orchestra, K364. Gidon Kremer, violin, Kim Kashkashian, viola, Nikolaus Harnoncourt, conductor, Vienna Philharmonic. (CD DG 413 461–2)
- Wolfgang Amadeus Mozart: Divertimento in Eb, K563. Gidon Kremer, violin, Kim Kashkashian, viola, Yo-Yo Ma, cello. (CD Sony SK39561)
- Wolfgang Amadeus Mozart: Quintet in c minor, K406. Guarneri Quartet, Kim Kashkashian, viola. (CD RCA 7771-2-RC)
- Wolfgang Amadeus Mozart: Quintet in E♭ major, K614. Guarneri Quartet, Kim Kashkashian, viola. (CD RCA 7772-2-RC)
- Betty Olivero: Neharo't Neharo't. Kim Kashkashian, viola, Alexander Liebreich, conductor, Münchener Kammerorchester. (CD ECM)
- Krzysztof Penderecki: Viola Concerto. Kim Kashkashian, viola, Dennis Russell Davies, conductor, Stuttgarter Kammerorchester. (CD ECM 1506)
- Alfred Schnittke: Viola Concerto. Kim Kashkashian, viola, Dennis Russell Davies, conductor, Rundfunk-Sinfonieorchester Saarbrücken. (CD ECM 1471)
- Franz Schubert: Quartet No. 15 in G major, Op. 161 D887. Gidon Kremer, Daniel Phillips, violins, Kim Kashkashian, viola, Yo-Yo Ma, cello. (CD Sony MK42134)
- Erwin Schulhoff: Sextet. Gidon Kremer, Philippe Hirschhorn, violins, Nobuko Imai, Kim Kashkashian, violas, David Geringas, Julius Berger, cellos. (LP ECM 1347/48)
- Robert Schumann: Märchenbilder, Op. 113, Märchenerzählungen, Op. 132. Kim Kashkashian, viola, Robert Levin, piano, Eduard Brunner, clarinet. (CD ECM 1508)
- Dmitri Shostakovich: Sonata for Viola and Piano, Op. 147. Kim Kashkashian, viola, Robert Levin, piano. (CD ECM 1425)
- Dmitri Shostakovich: String Quartet No. 14, Op. 142. Gidon Kremer, Yuzuko Horigome, violins, Kim Kashkashian, viola, David Geringas, cello. Edition Lockenhaus Vol. 4/5. (LP ECM 1347/48)
- Dmitri Shostakovich: String Quartet No. 15, Op. 144. Gidon Kremer, Daniel Phillips, violins, Kim Kashkashian, viola, Yo-Yo Ma, cello. (CD Sony MK44924)
- Ralph Vaughan Williams: Romance for Viola and Piano. Kim Kashkashian, viola, Robert Levin, piano. (CD ECM 1316)
- Henri Vieuxtemps: Elegie for Viola and Piano, Op. 30. Kim Kashkashian, viola, Robert Levin, piano. (CD ECM 1316)
- Morton Feldman, Erik Satie, John Cage: Rothko Chapel. Kim Kashkashian, Sarah Rothenberg, Steven Schick, Houston Chamber Choir, Robert Simpson. (CD ECM 2378)
