= Harald Bergmann =

Dutch politician (born 1965)

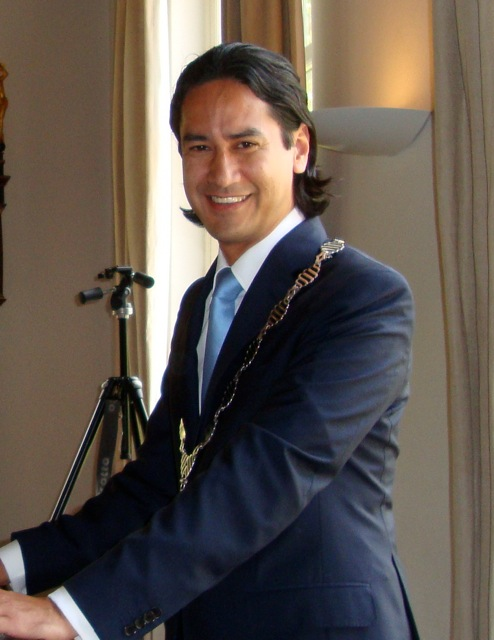
Harald Bergmann giving a speech in Rhoon Castle, 14 May 2010.

Harald M. Bergmann (born 23 September 1965, Rotterdam) is a Dutch politician of the VVD. Since August 27, 2012 he has been mayor of Middelburg, capital of the province of Zeeland. Before that, he was mayor of the municipality of Albrandswaard.

After a Law study at the Leiden University Bergmann first worked several years in the economic sector and at the municipality of Rotterdam. In 2002, he was elected chairman of Rotterdam Centrum. His main responsibilities were safety, finance and communication.

From November 2005 until August 2012 he was mayor of the municipality of Albrandswaard. In August 2012 he became mayor of the municipality of Middelburg.

Bergmann married Marjolijn van Leeuwen; they have a daughter (2005) and a son (2006).
