= Sheringham (surname) =

Sheringham is a surname. Notable people with this surname include:

- Charlie Sheringham (born 1988), English footballer
- George Sheringham (1884–1937), British painter and theatre designer
- Jackson Sheringham (born 1988), Australian rules football player
- John Sheringham (1820–1904), English clergyman, Archdeacon of Gloucester
- Michael Sheringham (1948–2016), British professor of French literature
- Robert Sheringham (1602–1678), English linguist, scholar and royalist writer
- Teddy Sheringham (born 1966), English football manager and former player
