= Officium (album) =

Live album by Jan Garbarek & the Hilliard Ensemble
- Released: September 1994
- Recorded: September 1993
- Venue: Propstei St. Gerold; Austria
- Genre: Jazz, Gregorian chant
- Length: 77:34
- Label: ECM New Series; ECM 1525
- Producer: Manfred Eicher

Jan Garbarek chronology
Madar (1994)	Officium (1994)	Visible World (1996)

Officium is an album by Norwegian saxophonist Jan Garbarek and British male vocal quartet Hilliard Ensemble recorded at the monastery of Propstei St. Gerold in Austria in September 1993 and released on ECM the following year.

== Background ==
The artists had been brought together by the producer Manfred Eicher. Their musical collaboration is based on 12th- to 16th-century liturgical works by composers including Cristóbal de Morales and Perotinus Magnus. It became one of the most successful releases on the ECM label, achieving sales of more than 1.5 million. Following a number of successful concert tours, a series of collaborative albums was released: Mnemosyne (1999), Officium Novum (2010) and Remember me, my dear (2019).

== Reception ==
Professional ratings
Review scores
Source	Rating
AllMusic	3.5/5 stars
The Penguin Guide to Jazz Recordings	2.5/4 stars

AllMusic awards the album with 3½ stars and Richard S. Ginell's review says: "Recorded in a heavily reverberant Austrian monastery, the voices sometimes develop in overwhelming waves, and Garbarek rides their crest, his soprano saxophone soaring in the monastery acoustic, or he underscores the voices almost unobtrusively, echoing the voices, finding ample room to move around the modal harmonies yet applying his sound sparingly."

Marius Gabriel remarked that Officium is "what Coltrane hears in heaven".

== Track listing ==
1. "Parce mihi domine" (from the Officium Defunctorum by Cristóbal de Morales) – 6:42
2. "Primo tempore" (Anonymous) – 8:03
3. "Sanctus" (Anonymous) – 4:44
4. "Regnantem Sempiterna" (Anonymous) – 5:36
5. "O Salutaris Hostia" (Pierre de la Rue) – 4:34
6. "Procedentem sponsum" (Anonymous) – 2:50
7. "Pulcherrima rosa" (Anonymous) – 6:55
8. "Parce mihi domine" (de Morales) – 5:35
9. "Beata viscera" (Magister Perotinus) – 6:34
10. "De spineto nata rosa" (Anonymous) – 2:30
11. "Credo" (Anonymous) – 2:06
12. "Ave maris stella" (Guillaume Du Fay) – 4:14
13. "Virgo flagellatur" (Anonymous) – 5:19
14. "Oratio Ieremiae" (Anonymous) – 5:00
15. "Parce mihi domine" (de Morales) – 6:52

== Personnel ==
=== Musicians ===
- Jan Garbarek – soprano and tenor saxophones
- Hilliard Ensemble
  - David James – countertenor
  - Rogers Covey-Crump – tenor
  - John Potter – tenor
  - Gordon Jones – baritone

=== Technical personnel ===
- Peter Laenger – tonmeister

== Certifications ==
Region	Certification	Certified units/sales
Netherlands (NVPI)	Gold	50,000^{^}
Norway (IFPI Norway)	Gold	25,000^{*}
Switzerland (IFPI Switzerland)	Gold	25,000^{^}
United Kingdom (BPI)	Gold	100,000^{^}
^{*} Sales figures based on certification alone.^{^} Shipments figures based on certification alone.
