= Hilliard Ensemble =

British male vocal quartet

- Origin: London, England
- Genres: Classical Music; Choral
- Years active: 1973-2014
- Labels: Harmonia Mundi; EMI Reflexe; Erato Records; Coro; ECM Records
- Past members: Paul Hillier; Errol Girdlestone; Paul Elliott; David James; Rogers Covey-Crump; John Potter; Gordon Jones; Steven Harrold

Hilliard Ensemble was a British male vocal quartet originally devoted to the performance of early music. The group was named after the Elizabethan miniaturist painter Nicholas Hilliard. Founded in 1974, the group disbanded in 2014.

Although most of its work focused on music of the Medieval and Renaissance periods, the Hilliard Ensemble also performed contemporary music, working frequently with the Estonian composer Arvo Pärt and included in its concerts works by John Cage, Gavin Bryars, Giya Kancheli, and Heinz Holliger.

== History ==
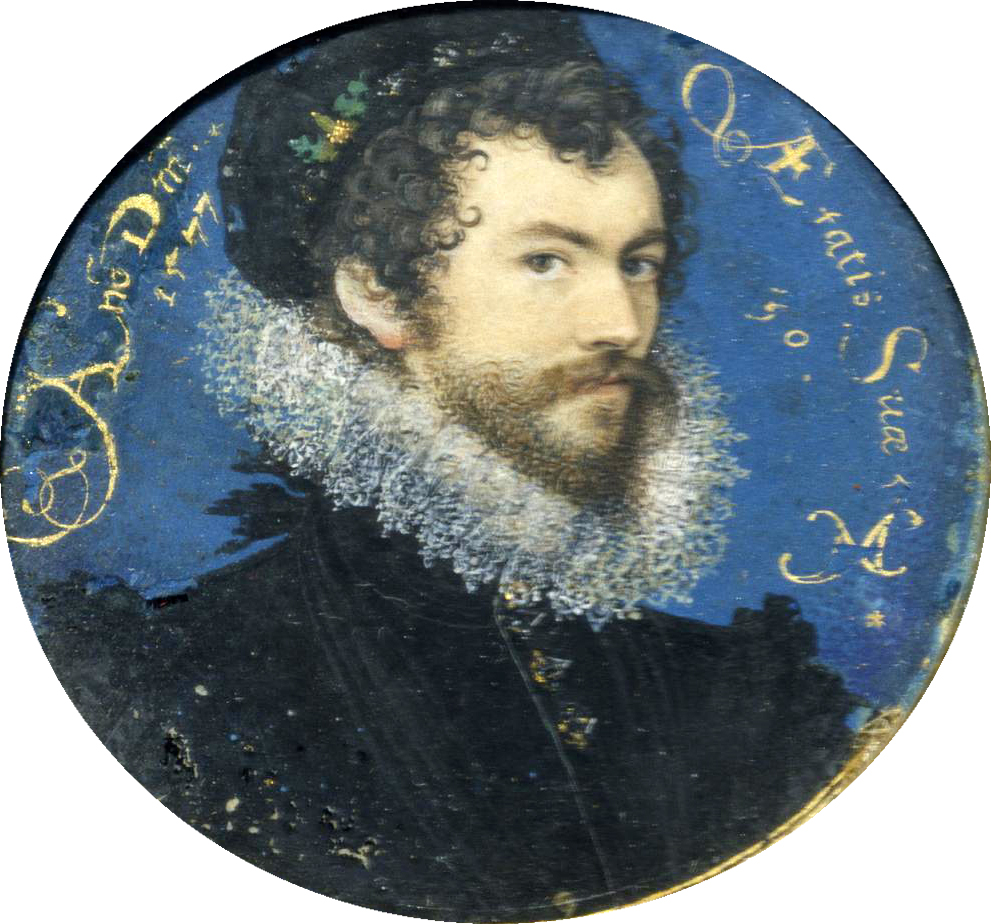
A self-portrait by Nicholas Hilliard (1577)

=== Membership ===
The group was founded by Paul Hillier, Errol Girdlestone, Paul Elliott, and David James, although the membership was flexible until Hillier left in 1990. After that, the core members were David James (counter-tenor), Rogers Covey-Crump (tenor/high tenor), John Potter (tenor), and Gordon Jones (bass), except that in 1998 John Potter was replaced by Steven Harrold.

=== Recordings ===
The Hilliard Ensemble, under Paul Hillier, had an extensive discography with EMI's Reflexe early music series during the 1980s. The ensemble then recorded mainly for the ECM label. In 1994, when popular interest in Gregorian chant was at its height, the ensemble released the CD Officium, an unprecedented collaboration with the Norwegian saxophonist Jan Garbarek. The disc became one of ECM's biggest-selling releases, reaching the pop charts in several European countries and receiving five gold discs in sales. Officium's sequel, the 2-CD set Mnemosyne, followed in 1999. The third album, Officium Novum, was released in 2010. Their recordings have also been included in Craig Wright's Listening to Music textbook for music students and music appreciation.

=== Performances ===
In 2005 the ensemble took part in the Rheingau Musik Festival's composer's portrait of Arvo Pärt, together with the Rostock Motet Choir. In 2008 the Hilliard Ensemble premiered Heiner Goebbels' avant-garde staged concert I went to the house but did not enter at the 2008 Edinburgh International Festival, repeated at the Berliner Festspiele.

=== New music ===
In 2009 the ensemble premiered five new works: Guido Morini's Una Iliade, Fabio Vacchi's Memoria Italiana, Steffen Schleiermacher's Die Beschwörung der Trunkenen Oase, Simon Bainbridge's Tenebrae and Wolfgang Rihm's Et Lux. In September 2010 the Hilliard Ensemble joined the London Philharmonic Choir and Orchestra for the world premiere of Matteo D'Amico's Flight from Byzantium at the Royal Festival Hall, London.

=== Miscellaneous ===
They also performed three pieces by Guillaume Dufay: Moribus et genere, Vergene bella and Lamentatio sanctae matris ecclesiae Constantinopolitanae.

On 15 November 2010, the group appeared at Church of St. Paul the Apostle in New York to perform Kjartan Sveinsson's Cage a Swallow Can’t You but You Can’t Swallow a Cage.

=== Disbanding ===
The Hilliard Ensemble decided to disband after 41 years and gave their final concert on 20 December 2014 at the Wigmore Hall, London.

== Selected discography ==
=== Harmonia Mundi ===
- 1982: Cipriano de Rore: Le Vergine (LP, HM 1107)
- 1982: Medieval English Music (HMC 901106)
- 1983: Sumer is icumen in (HMC 901154)
- 1983: The Singing Club (HMC 901153)

=== EMI Reflexe ===
- 1980: Lionel Power: Messen und Motetten (LP, EMI Reflexe 1C 069-46 402)
- 1982: John Dunstable: Motets (EMI Reflexe CDC 7 49002 2)
- 1983: Josquin Desprez: Motets and chansons (EMI Reflexe CDC 7 49209 2)
- 1983: Schütz: Matthäus-Passion (EMI Reflexe CDC 7 49200 2)
- 1984: J. S. Bach Motets (EMI Reflexe CDC 7 49204 2) with Knabenchor Hannover
- 1984: Ockeghem: Requiem; Missa Mi-Mi (EMI Reflexe CDC 7 49213 2)
- 1984: Palestrina: Canticum canticorum, Spiritual madrigals (EMI Reflexe CDS 7 49010 8)
- 1985: Schütz: Schwanengesang (Opus ultimum) (EMI Reflexe CDS 7 49214 8) with London Baroque and Knabenchor Hannover
- 1985: Lassus: Penitential Psalms (EMI Reflexe CDS 7 49211 8) with the Kees Boeke Consort
- 1986: Dufay: Missa L'Homme armé, Motets (EMI Reflexe CDC 7 47628 2)
- 1987: Draw on Sweet Night - English Madrigals (EMI Reflexe CDC 7 49197 2)
- 1988: Ockeghem: Missa prolationum and Marian Motets (EMI Reflexe CDC 7 49798 2)
- 1989: Josquin Desprez: Missa Hercules Dux Ferrariae (EMI Reflexe CDC 7 49960 2)

=== Coro ===
- 1996: Perotin and the Ars Antiqua (HL 1001)
- 1996: For Ockeghem (HL 1002) music by Ockeghem, Busnois and Lupi and translated excerpts from Lament on the Death of the Late Ockeghem by Guillaume Crétin
- 1997: Antoine Brumel (HL 1003)
- 1998: Guillaume Dufay - Missa Se la Face ay Pale (HL 1004)

=== ECM ===
- 1986: Thomas Tallis: The Lamentations of Jeremiah (ECM 1341)
- 1987: Arbos (ECM 1325) with the Staatsorchester Stuttgart Brass Ensemble under Dennis Russell Davies performing works of Arvo Pärt
- 1988: Passio (ECM 1370) performing works of Pärt
- 1989: Perotin (ECM 1385) performing works of Perotin
- 1991: Tenebrae (ECM 1422–23) performing works of Carlo Gesualdo
- 1991: Miserere (ECM 1430) performing works of Pärt
- 1993: The Hilliard Ensemble Sings Walter Frye (ECM 1476)
- 1994: Officium (ECM 1525) with Jan Garbarek (Part 1 of the Officium-trilogy)
- 1995: Codex Speciálník (ECM 1504)
- 1996: A Hilliard Songbook - New Music for Voices (ECM 1614–15)
- 1998: Lassus (ECM 1658) performing works of Orlande de Lassus
- 1999: Mnemosyne (ECM 1700–01) with Jan Garbarek (Part 2 of the Officium-trilogy)
- 2001: Morimur (ECM 1765) with Christoph Poppen
- 2003: Ricercar (ECM 1774) with Christoph Poppen and Münchener Kammerorchester performing works of Bach and Webern
- 2003: Tituli - Cathedral in the Thrashing Rain (ECM 1861) performing works of Stephen Hartke
- 2004: Motets (ECM 2324) performing works of Guillaume de Machaut
- 2005: Lamentate (ECM 1930) with Alexei Lubimov performing works of Pärt
- 2007: Motetten (ECM 1875) performing works of Bach
- 2008: Audivi Vocem (ECM 1936) performing works of Thomas Tallis, Christopher Tye and John Sheppard
- 2010: Officium Novum (ECM 2125) with Jan Garbarek (Part 3 of the Officium-trilogy)
- 2011: Song of Songs (ECM 2174) with the Rosamunde Quartett performing works of Boris Yoffe
- 2012: Quinto Libro di Madrigali (ECM 2175) performing works of Gesualdo
- 2013: Terje Rypdal: Melodic Warrior (ECM 2006)
- 2013: Il Cor Tristo (ECM 2346) performing works of Roger Marsh, Bernardo Pisano and Jacques Arcadelt
- 2014: Transeamus (ECM 2408)
- 2015: Heinz Holliger: Machaut-Transkriptionen (ECM 2224) with Geneviève Strosser, Jürg Dähler and Muriel Cantoreggi
- 2019: Remember me, my dear (ECM 2625) with Jan Garbarek

=== Other labels ===
- 1983: Madrigals by Luca Marenzio (University of East Anglia Recordings UEA 82126)
- 1988: Music from the time of Christian IV. Church Music at Court and in Town (BIS CD-389)
- 1990: The Romantic Englishman (Meridian Records DUOCD 89009)
- 1996: Sweet Love, Sweet Hope (Isis Records CD030)
- 1997: Cristóbal de Morales: Missa Mille Regretz (Almaviva DS-0101)
- 2013: Prayers and Praise. Vocal music by Alexander Raskatov (Challenge Classics CC72578)
- 2013 "Lord, who made the spring run", "The Sea of our life" Vache Sharafyan (LCMS) In search of miraculous
- 2016: Roger Marsh: Poor Yorick (CMRC001)
- 2017: Trans Limen ad Lumen (Divox CDX-21702)
- 2019: John Casken: The Dream of the Rood (NMC Recordings NMC D245) with Asko/Schönberg
