= Jan Garbarek =

Norwegian jazz saxophonist (born 1947)

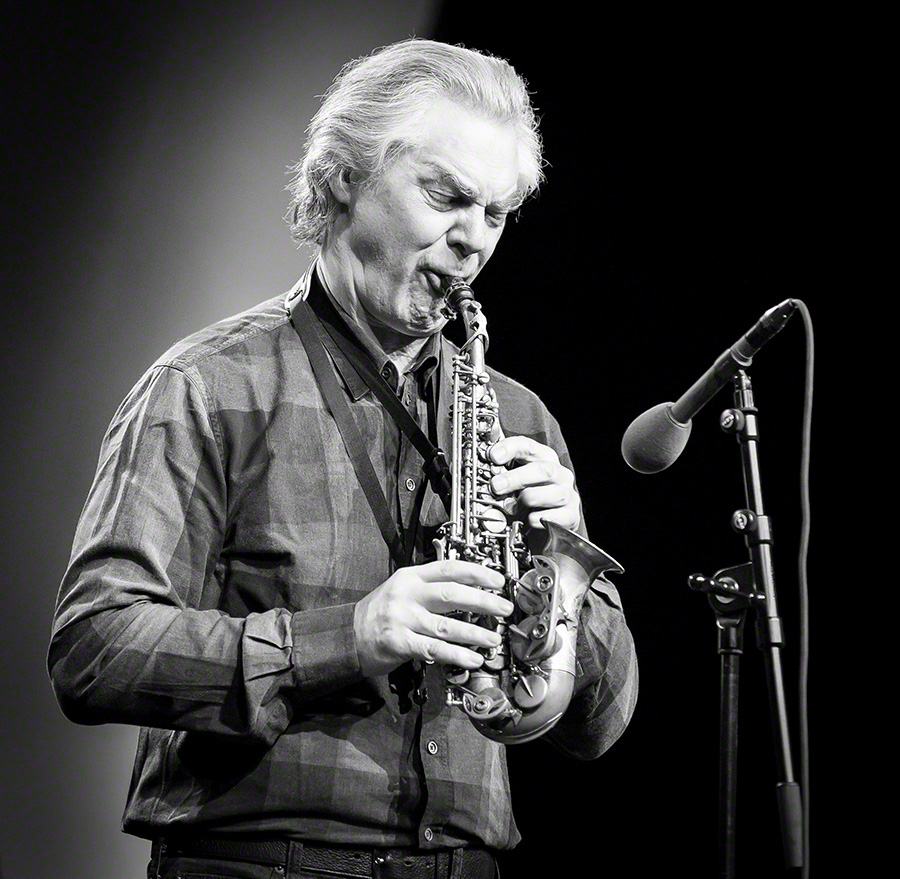
- Jan Garbarek in Oslo in 2016

Background information
- Born: 4 March 1947 (age 79); Mysen, Østfold, Norway
- Origin: Oslo, Norway
- Genres: Jazz, classical, world
- Occupation: Musician
- Instrument: Saxophone
- Years active: 1966–present
- Labels: ECM, Flying Dutchman

Jan Garbarek (Norwegian pronunciation: [jɑːn ɡɑɾˈbɑ̀ːɾək]) (born 4 March 1947) is a Norwegian jazz saxophonist, who is also active in classical music and world music.

Garbarek was born in Mysen, Østfold, southeastern Norway, the only child of a former Polish prisoner of war, Czesław Garbarek, and a Norwegian woman, Kari Nordbø. He grew up in Oslo, stateless until the age of seven, as there was no automatic grant of citizenship in Norway at the time. When he was 21, he married the author Vigdis Garbarek. He is the father of musician and composer Anja Garbarek.

== Biography ==
Garbarek's style incorporates a sharp-edged tone, long, keening, sustained notes, and generous use of silence. He began his recording career in the late 1960s, notably featuring on recordings by the American jazz composer George Russell (such as Electronic Sonata for Souls Loved by Nature). By 1973 he had turned his back on the harsh dissonances of avant-garde jazz, retaining only his tone from his previous approach. Garbarek gained wider recognition through his work with pianist Keith Jarrett's European Quartet which released the albums Belonging (1974), My Song (1977), and the live recordings Personal Mountains (recorded in 1979 but released only a decade later in 1989), and Nude Ants (1979). He was also a featured soloist on Jarrett's orchestral works Luminessence (1974) and Arbour Zena (1975).

As a composer, Garbarek tends to draw heavily from Scandinavian folk melodies, a legacy of his Ayler influence. He is also a pioneer of ambient jazz composition, most notably on his 1976 album Dis, a collaboration with guitarist Ralph Towner, that featured the distinctive sound of a wind harp on several tracks. This textural approach, which rejects traditional notions of thematic improvisation (best exemplified by Sonny Rollins) in favour of a style described by critics Richard Cook and Brian Morton as "sculptural in its impact", has been critically divisive. Garbarek's more meandering recordings are often labeled as new-age music, or spiritual ancestors thereof. Other experiments have included setting a collection of poems of Olav H. Hauge to music, with a single saxophone complementing a full mixed choir; this has led to notable performances with Grex Vocalis.

In the 1980s, Garbarek's music began to incorporate synthesizers and elements of world music. He has collaborated with Indian and Pakistani musicians such as Trilok Gurtu, Zakir Hussain, Hariprasad Chaurasia, and Bade Fateh Ali Khan. Garbarek is credited for composing original music for the 2000 film Kippur.

In 1994, during the heightened popularity of Gregorian chant, his album Officium, a collaboration with early music vocal performers from the Hilliard Ensemble, became one of ECM's biggest-selling albums of all time, reaching the pop charts in several European countries and was followed by a sequel, Mnemosyne, in 1999. Officium Novum, another sequel album, was released in September 2010. In 2005, his album In Praise of Dreams was nominated for a Grammy Award. Garbarek's first live album Dresden was released in 2009.

== Gallery ==
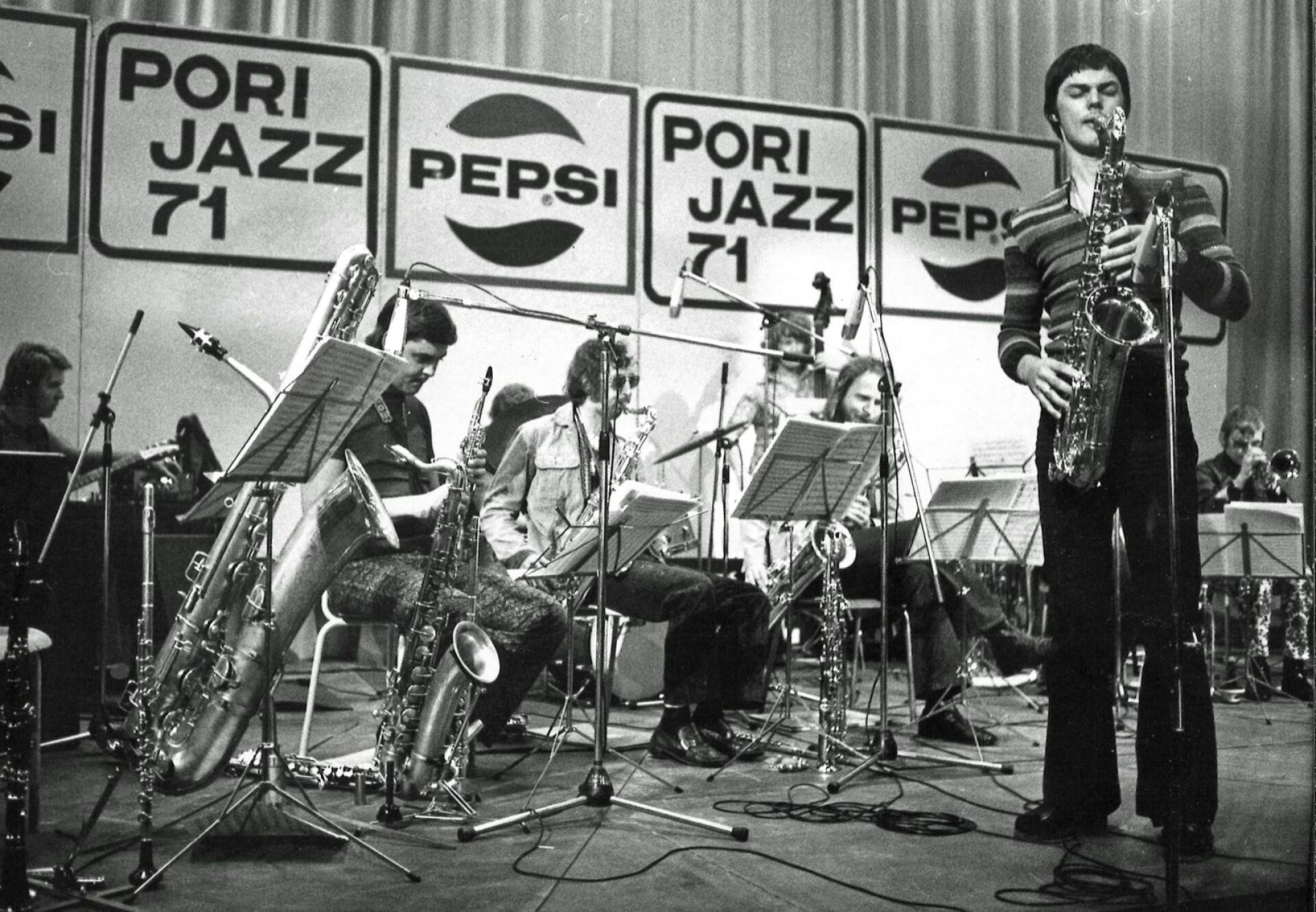
Jan Garbarek performing live at the 1971 edition of the Pori Jazz Festival in Finland with Nordic Big Band.

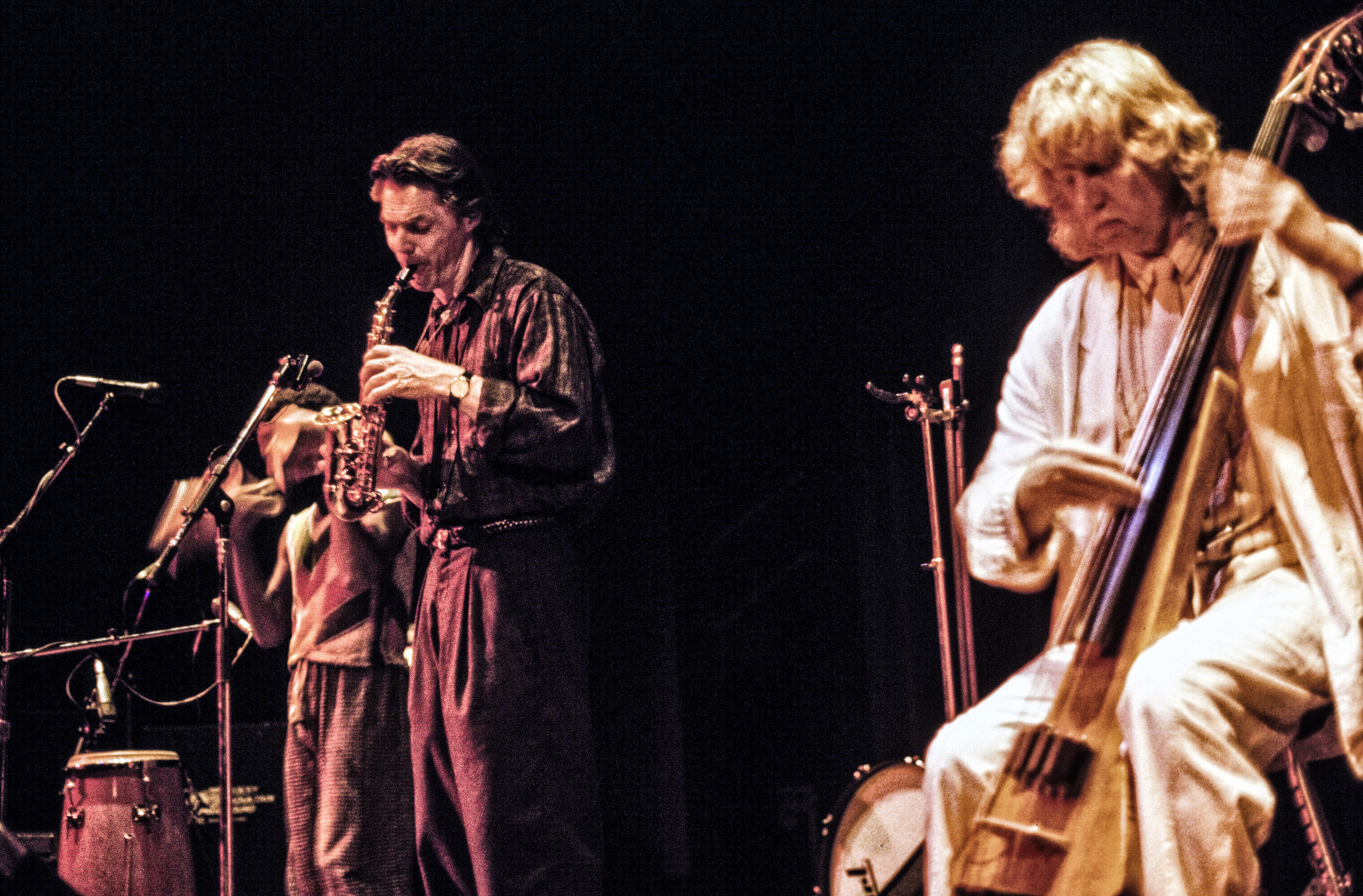
Garbarek with Eberhard Weber and Naná Vasconcelos in Vancouver, British Columbia, Canada in 1987

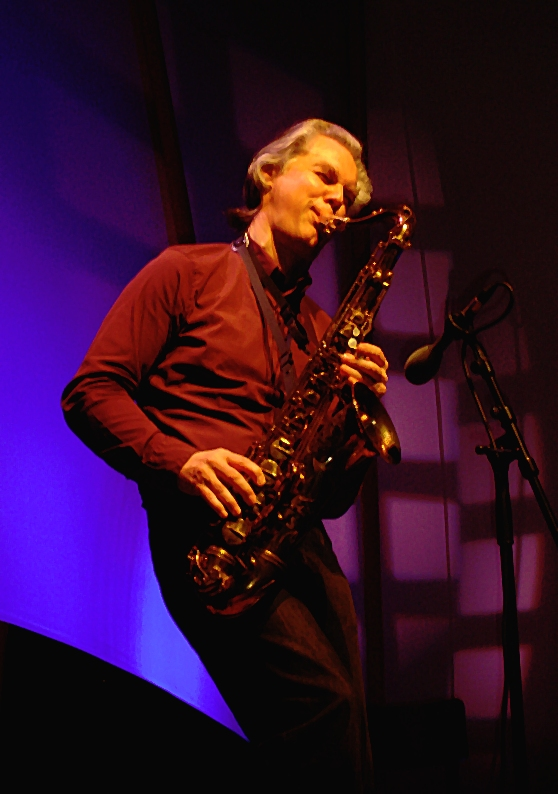
Garbarek performing live in 2007

== Awards and honors ==
- 1999: (Norway) Knight 1st Class of the Order of St. Olav
- 2004: (Norway) Norwegian Arts Council Award
- 2014: (Germany) Willy Brandt Award

=== Memberships ===
Garbarek is foreign member of the Royal Swedish Academy of Music.

== Discography ==
=== As leader/co-leader ===
- 1967: Til Vigdis (Norsk Jazzforbund, 1967)
- 1969: Esoteric Circle (Flying Dutchman, 1971)
- 1970: Afric Pepperbird (ECM, 1971)
- 1970: Hav with Jan Erik Vold (Philips, 1971)
- 1971: Sart with Terje Rypdal (ECM, 1971)
- 1973: Triptykon (ECM, 1973)
- 1974: Witchi-Tai-To with Bobo Stenson (ECM, 1974)
- 1976: Dansere with Bobo Stenson (ECM, 1976)
- 1977: Dis with Ralph Towner (ECM, 1977)
- 1978: Places with Bill Connors (ECM, 1978)
- 1979: Photo with Blue Sky, White Cloud, Wires, Windows and a Red Roof with Bill Connors (ECM, 1979)
- 1980: Aftenland with Kjell Johnsen (ECM, 1980)
- 1981: Eventyr with John Abercrombie and Naná Vasconcelos (ECM, 1981)
- 1982: Paths, Prints with Bill Frisell (ECM, 1982)
- 1983: Wayfarer with Bill Frisell and Eberhard Weber (ECM, 1983)
- 1985: It's OK to Listen to the Gray Voice with David Torn (ECM, 1985)
- 1987: All Those Born with Wings (ECM, 1987)
- 1988: Legend of the Seven Dreams with Rainer Brüninghaus (ECM, 1988)
- 1989: Rosensfole with Agnes Buen Garnås (ECM, 1989)
- 1990: I Took Up the Runes (ECM, 1990)
- 1990: Ragas and Sagas with Ustad Fateh Ali Khan (ECM, 1992)
- 1991: StAR with Miroslav Vitouš (ECM, 1991)
- 1992: Stemmer with Vigdis Garbarek (NRK, 1992)
- 1992: Madar with Anouar Brahem and Shaukat Hussain (ECM, 1994)
- 1992: Twelve Moons (ECM, 1993)
- 1994: Officium with the Hilliard Ensemble (ECM, 1994) – live
- 1994: Trollsyn (TrollCD, 1994) – for promotion
- 1995: Visible World (ECM, 1996)
- 1998: Rites (ECM, 1998)
- 1998: Mnemosyne with the Hilliard Ensemble (ECM, 1999)
- 2003: In Praise of Dreams (ECM, 2004)
- 2003: Dresden (ECM, 2009) – live
- 2009: Officium Novum with the Hilliard Ensemble (ECM, 2010) – live
- 2014: Remember Me, My Dear with the Hilliard Ensemble (ECM, 2019)

=== As sideman ===
With Charlie Haden and Egberto Gismonti

- Magico (ECM, 1980)
- Folk Songs (ECM, 1981)
- Magico: Carta de Amor (ECM, 2012)

With Keith Jarrett

- 1974: Belonging (ECM, 1974)
- 1974: Luminessence (ECM, 1975)
- 1975: Arbour Zena (ECM, 1976)
- 1977: My Song (ECM, 1978)
- 1979: Personal Mountains (ECM, 1989)
- 1979: Sleeper (ECM, 2012)
- 1979: Nude Ants (ECM, 1980)

With Eleni Karaindrou

- Music For Films (ECM, 1991)
- Concert in Athens (ECM, 2013)

With Karin Krog

- Jazz Moments (Sonet, 1966)
- Joy (Sonet, 1968)

With Gary Peacock

- December Poems (ECM, 1977)
- Voice from the Past - Paradigm (ECM, 1981)
- Guamba (ECM, 1987)

With Terje Rypdal

- Bleak House (Polydor, 1968)
- Terje Rypdal (ECM, 1971)

With George Russell

- Electronic Sonata for Souls Loved by Nature (Flying Dutchman, 1969)
- Trip to Prillarguri (Soul Note, 1970)
- Listen to the Silence (Soul Note, 1971)

With L. Shankar

- Vision (ECM, 1984) – rec. 1983
- Song for Everyone (ECM, 1985) – rec. 1984

With Ralph Towner

- Solstice (ECM, 1975)
- Solstice/Sound and Shadows (ECM, 1977)

With Jan Erik Vold

- Hav (Philips, 1971)
- Ingentings Bjeller (Polydor, 1977)

With Miroslav Vitouš

- Atmos (ECM, 1993) – rec. 1992
- Universal Syncopations (ECM, 2003)

With Eberhard Weber

- Chorus (ECM, 1984)
- Stages of a Long Journey (ECM, 2007)
- Résumé (ECM, 2012)
- Hommage à Eberhard Weber (ECM, 2015)

With others

- Bill Connors, Of Mist and Melting (ECM, 1977)
- David Darling, Cycles (ECM, 1981)
- Paul Giger, Alpstein (ECM, 1991)
- Egberto Gismonti, Sol Do Meio Dia (ECM, 1977)
- Trilok Gurtu, Living Magic (CMP, 1991)
- Zakir Hussain, Making Music (ECM, 1986)
- Giya Kancheli, Caris Mere (ECM, 1995)
- Kim Kashkashian, Monodia (ECM, 2004)
- Manu Katché, Neighbourhood (ECM, 2005)
- Art Lande, Red Lanta (ECM, 1974)
- Marilyn Mazur, Elixir (ECM, 2008)
- Kenny Wheeler, Deer Wan (ECM, 1978)

Awards
Preceded by Jon Christensen	Recipient of the Buddyprisen; 1968	Succeeded by Arild Andersen
Preceded by First award in 1982	Recipient of the Gammleng-prisen; 1982	Succeeded by Karin Krog
Preceded by Jon Fosse	Recipient of the Norsk kulturråds ærespris 2004	Succeeded by Agnes Buen Garnås
