= John Potter (musician) =

English tenor and academic

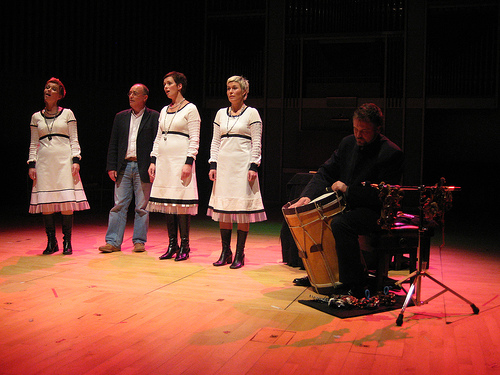
- Potter performing with Trio Mediæval
- Occupations: classical singer; academic
- Years active: 1970s - present
- Website: john-potter.co.uk

John Potter is an English tenor and academic.

== Early life and education ==
John Potter's musical education began as a chorister in the Choir of King's College, Cambridge, after which he became a scholar at The King's School, Canterbury and exhibitioner at Gonville and Caius College, Cambridge. His coaches included lieder specialist Walter Gruner, accompanist Paul Hamburger, and the tenor Peter Pears.

== Performance ==
Potter specialises in early and contemporary classical music vocal music. In addition to his solo work, he has performed with many vocal ensembles including the Hilliard Ensemble, The Swingle Singers, The Dowland Project, the Gavin Bryars Ensemble, and Red Byrd, of which he is a co-founder. His discography includes over 100 recordings encompassing his eclectic musical interests including Léonin and Led Zeppelin. He has received a fifth gold disc for the Hilliard Ensemble's Officium album.

He is also an ensemble coach, mentoring groups such as Trio Mediæval from Norway, The Kassiopeia Ensemble from the Netherlands, and Juice from the United Kingdom. His later collaborations have included Being Dufay with electronic music composer Ambrose Field and the lutenist and vihuela player Ariel Abramovich.

== Academic work ==
Potter is a reader emeritus for the Music Department at the University of York; before retirement he was the director of the Vocal Studies postgraduate program. His research interests include the sociology of vocal music and vocal repertory, especially Renaissance and contemporary music.

Potter is the editor of the Cambridge Companion to Singing (1998) and is the author of numerous articles in academic publications. His books include:

- Vocal authority: Singing Style and Ideology, Cambridge University Press, 1998
- Tenor: History of a Voice, Yale University Press, 2009
- A History of Singing (with Neil Sorrell), Cambridge University Press, 2012
