= ECM Records =

German independent record label

- Founded: 1969
- Founder: Manfred Eicher
- Distributor: Universal Music
- Genre: Jazz, classical, world
- Country of origin: Germany
- Location: Munich
- Official website: ecmrecords.com

ECM (Edition of Contemporary Music) is an independent record label founded by Karl Egger, Manfred Eicher and Manfred Scheffner in Munich in 1969. While ECM is best known for jazz music, the label has released a variety of recordings, and ECM's artists often refuse to acknowledge boundaries between genres. ECM's motto is "the most beautiful sound next to silence", taken from a 1971 review of ECM releases in Coda, a Canadian jazz magazine.

ECM has been distributed in the U.S. by Warner Bros. Records, PolyGram Records, BMG, and, since 1999, Universal Music, the successor of PolyGram, worldwide. Its album covers were profiled in two books: Sleeves of Desire and Windfall Light, both published by Lars Müller.

== History ==
The first ECM release produced by Manfred Scheffner was pianist Mal Waldron's 1969 recording Free at Last. The label went on to release recordings by many prominent jazz musicians, including Paul Bley, Jack DeJohnette, Keith Jarrett, Jan Garbarek, Pat Metheny, Gary Burton, Chick Corea, Charlie Haden, John Abercrombie, Dave Liebman, Eberhard Weber, Egberto Gismonti, Dave Holland, Terje Rypdal, Stefano Bollani and Ralph Towner. The label has also released recordings in the world music genre by artists including Steve Tibbetts, Stephan Micus, Codona, Anouar Brahem, L. Shankar, Jon Hassell, and Naná Vasconcelos.

Manfred Eicher continues to take an active interest in the music released by ECM, acting as producer of the vast majority of its recordings, although Steve Lake, Thomas Stoewsand, Robert Hurwitz, Lee Townsend, Hans Wendl and Sun Chung have also produced discs for the label. The typical ECM session is just three days: two days to record, one day to mix. Many of the albums have been recorded with Jan Erik Kongshaug (of Talent Studios and later Rainbow Studios) in Oslo, Norway, as sound engineer; other engineers have included Martin Wieland (who recorded Jarrett's "The Köln Concert"), James Farber, Stefano Amerio and, on classical recordings, Peter Laenger.

=== New Series and commemorative editions ===
The ECM New Series was created in 1984 to document Western classical works. It has released works by composers from the early (Thomas Tallis, Carlo Gesualdo, Giovanni Pierluigi da Palestrina) to the contemporary (John Cage, Elliott Carter, Steve Reich and John Adams). The series was initiated for Arvo Pärt's record debut Tabula Rasa, which Eicher recorded and produced in 1977, 1983, and 1984. Since then Pärt and Eicher have built a strong relationship: all works premiere on recordings for the label and all are done in presence of the composer. Keith Jarrett, better known as a jazz musician, contributed together with Gidon Kremer amongst others to Tabula Rasa. He later recorded several classical works by Bach, Mozart, Shostakovich, and others for the series.

The three albums Music for 18 Musicians, Octet/Music for a Large Ensemble/Violin Phase, and Tehillim by Reich were recorded before 1984 (all with the composer performing) and were later moved to the classical department together with some by Meredith Monk, Thomas Demenga and Harald Weiss. Several of John Adams' works from his minimalist period have been released through the label as well, including Harmonium and Harmonielehre.

Over the years, many other works by contemporary composers such as Valentyn Sylvestrov, Tigran Mansurian, Erkki-Sven Tüür, Heinz Holliger, Giya Kancheli, György Kurtág, or Heiner Goebbels as well as the soundtracks of several works by the filmmaker Jean-Luc Godard have been issued on the ECM New Series label. Interpreters who released records in classical genres include Kim Kashkashian, András Schiff, Gidon Kremer, the Hilliard Ensemble, Thomas Zehetmair, Carolin Widmann, Till Fellner, Herbert Henck, Alexei Lubimov, András Keller, Miklós Perényi, John Holloway, John Potter or most recently Patricia Kopatchinskaja.

On many releases, the orientations towards jazz and classical music of ECM are combined: For example, Garbarek's Officium (1994) features him playing saxophone solos over the Hilliard Ensemble singing Gregorian chant, early polyphony and Renaissance works. Garbarek's work with guitarist Ralph Towner continued, and has been influenced by 20th century chamber music as much as by jazz-oriented material. John Potter, formerly of the Hilliard Ensemble, recorded works by John Dowland with jazz saxophonist John Surman and others, and Surman's Proverbs and Songs is a suite of choral settings of Old Testament texts, recorded in Salisbury Cathedral. The label has also released unique works that fit into no obvious genre at all (like the records of composer Meredith Monk).

In 2002 and 2004, ECM released a series of compilation CDs titled :rarum. Twenty of the label's artists were asked to compile a single CD of their work. (Garbarek's and Jarrett's compilations are double CDs.) Artists who contributed to this series are Keith Jarrett, Jan Garbarek, Chick Corea, Gary Burton, Bill Frisell, Art Ensemble of Chicago, Terje Rypdal, Bobo Stenson, Pat Metheny, Dave Holland, Egberto Gismonti, Jack DeJohnette, John Surman, John Abercrombie, Carla Bley, Paul Motian, Tomasz Stańko, Eberhard Weber, Arild Andersen, Jon Christensen.

After working as a writer for Melody Maker magazine, Steve Lake first joined the ECM-staff in 1978. While working predominantly for the writing department he now has also produced more than 40 records which are more in the experimental areas of jazz like ones of Evan Parker, Roscoe Mitchell, Hal Russell, Robin Williamson, Joe Maneri or Mat Maneri. Furthermore, he published the book Horizons Touched: The Music of ECM (2007) with music critic/novelist Paul Griffiths and made contributions to the books Sleeves of Desire: a Cover Story (1996), Windfall Light: The Visual Language of ECM (2010) and ECM - A Cultural Archaeology (2012).

=== Recent developments in online distribution ===
On November 14, 2017, ECM announced in a press release that its entire catalog would be made available for streaming on all major music streaming platforms (Apple Music, Amazon, Spotify, Deezer, Tidal and Qobuz). Previously, ECM recordings had never been available for streaming, save for a few select compilations of major performers. In a press release on its website, ECM explained its decision:

In recent years, ECM and the musicians have had to face unauthorized streaming of recordings via video sharing websites, plus piracy, bootlegs, and a proliferation of illegal download sites. It was important to make the catalogue accessible within a framework, where copyrights are respected.

ECM further added that the physical recordings (CD & vinyl records) still constitute the "preferred mediums".

== Exhibitions about ECM ==
In fall 2012, the Munich museum Haus der Kunst opened an exhibition about the work of the label called ECM – A Cultural Archaeology. It pointed out the early jazz-focused years until the mid-1980s, before the New Series was initiated. In close relation with Eicher and ECM, the exhibition was created by art curator Okwui Enwezor and Markus Müller. To complement the historically oriented content of the exhibition, it was accompanied with a concert series of current artists of the label, which included François Couturier, Enrico Rava, Meredith Monk, András Schiff, Evan Parker, Gidon Kremer or Tomasz Stańko. Some of these artists have a long relationship with the label—even if their 'home' is ECM or New Series.

Additionally, Eicher curated a film series of eleven selected movies, which relate to the label. While some of its filmmakers have been related to ECM, like Theo Angelopoulos or Jean-Luc Godard, others gave inspiration to the label, like Ingmar Bergman or Andrei Tarkovsky, and others used music by ECM. The physical catalogue of the exhibition was published by Prestel Verlag in German and English. Another extended exhibition was displayed in Seoul, Korea, from September until November 2013. Under the Gertrude Stein quote Think of your Ears as Eyes, the exhibition took a wider view on the label's history than the one in Munich. Again, it was accompanied by a concert series, including Kim Kashkashian, András Schiff, Myung-whun Chung, Heinz Holliger, Norma Winstone, Ralph Towner and Yeahwon Shin.

== ECM and film ==
The label has a special relation towards film and directors. Founder Manfred Eicher himself is a very passionate movie viewer and directed in 1990 an adaption of Max Frisch's Holozän together with Heinz Bütler. The label has also released some soundtracks e.g. for The Return (2003) by Andrey Zvyagintsev or Nouvelle Vague (ECM NewSeries 1600-01) and Histoire(s) du cinéma (ECM NewSeries 1706) by French-Swiss director Jean-Luc Godard. This collaboration expanded over the years and led on the one hand into the contribution of several stills from Godard's movies for covers like Morimur (ECM NewSeries 1765) by Christoph Poppen, Asturiana - Songs from Spain and Argentinia (ECM NewSeries 1975) by Kim Kashkashian or the 2011 Live at Birdland (ECM 2162) by Lee Konitz/Brad Mehldau/Charlie Haden/Paul Motian. On the other hand, Eicher took over the musical direction of many of Godard's films like Germany Year 90 Nine Zero, Hélas pour moi, JLG or For Ever Mozart. Besides these Eicher was also the head behind the music of Xavier Koller's Reise der Hoffnung, Sandra Nettelbeck's Mostly Martha and the Oscar-nominated documentary War Photographer by Christian Frei. Additionally Godard has released a collection of short films on the label with Anne-Marie Miéville called Four Short Films (ECM 5001).

Apart from her own work Greek composer Eleni Karaindrou wrote scores for stage and for movies, which include Ulysses' Gaze (1995), Eternity and a Day (1998) and The Dust of Time (1999), among others by filmmaker Theo Angelopoulos released on ECM. The Swiss actor Bruno Ganz, who has also worked with Angelopoulos, has recorded two spoken word-albums for the label: one in 1984 with poems by Friedrich Hölderlin (ECM New Series 1285) and one in 1999 called Wenn Wasser Wäre (ECM New Series 1723) with works of T. S. Eliot and Giorgos Seferis. Another nameable release is the record Scardanelli (ECM 1761) with texts and music from Harald Bergmann's film of the same name from 2000, which reflects the work of Hölderlin in his last years. In the title role, it features Austrian actor Walter Schmidinger who's reading the poems and texts on this record taken from the movie. In fall 2012, ECM released a record called Turmgedichte (ECM New Series 2285) by actor/voice actor/vocalist Christian Reiner also with poems by Hölderlin.

Furthermore, ECM has many projects and albums dedicated to people involved with motion pictures. For example, Italian piano player Stefano Battaglia pays tribute to the work of director Pier Paolo Pasolini on his 2007 Re: Pasolini (ECM 1998-99). Its cover pictures a still from Pasolini's 1964 The Gospel According to St. Matthew. In 2022 a recording of texts by the Italian film maker called Pier Paolo Pasolini: Land der Arbeit (ECM 2768) spoken in German by Reiner was released. Polish jazz trumpeter Tomasz Stańko recorded in 1994 Matka Joanna (ECM 1544) as an homage to Polish film director Jerzy Kawalerowicz's movie Matka Joanna od Aniołów (1961). Three years later on his 1997 Litania: Music of Krzysztof Komeda (ECM 1636) Stańko honors the work of another countryman and film composer Krzysztof Komeda who is widely known for the scores of several films by Roman Polanski but was also a jazz pianist. Polanski also contributed a preface for the booklet of Litania. The album Dans la Nuit (ECM 1805) by French woodwind player Louis Sclavis, who also was active as a film composer, is a new score for Charles Vanel's 1930 silent movie Dans la nuit (film).

The French pianist François Couturier dedicated a couple of his works to the Soviet/Russian director Andrei Tarkovsky. This includes pieces on his 2010 solo record Un jour si blanc (ECM 2103) and the albums Nostalghia - Song for Tarkovsky (ECM 1979) from 2006 as well as the Tarkovsky Quartet (ECM 2159) from 2011 - both with photographs and movie stills of Tarkovsky in the booklet. Other examples of works dedicated to the director are Arbos (ECM NewSeries 1325) by Estonian composer Arvo Pärt, the piece Eight Hymns in memoriam Andrei Tarkovsky by composer Stevan Kovacs Tickmayer which can be found on Gidon Kremer's 2010 Hymns and Prayers (ECM NewSeries 2161) or 3rd Piece by Jan Garbarek on his solo record All Those Born with Wings (ECM 1324). In Spring 2013 ECM released the record La notte by Ketil Bjørnstad which took its inspiration from Italian filmmaker Michelangelo Antonioni; its title and cover were taken from the 1961 movie of the same name. Later that year an album by John Abercrombie was released with four allusions towards Hitchcock movies including the name of the title track taken from 39 Steps. On her 2018 album Descansado: Songs for Films (ECM 2567) English singer Norma Winstone pays tribute to composers like Nino Rota, Michel Legrand, William Walton, Bernard Herrmann, and Ennio Morricone - all strongly connected to movies - by rearranging their pieces.

The connection with motion pictures spans further and is reflected in the design of the booklet of Mnemosyne (ECM NewSeries 1700) by Jan Garbarek and the Hilliard Ensemble—the successor of its highly successful album Officium (ECM 1525). It includes stills from The Seventh Seal (1957) by Swedish director Ingmar Bergman.

In 1986, director Jan Horne shot the 60-minute documentary Bare Stillheten about Eicher and the label in Munich, Oslo, and Tokyo for television with Garbarek, Terje Rypdal, Jon Christensen, Arild Andersen, John Surman, Eberhard Weber, and others participating. There is also a documentary by Peter Guyer and Norbert Wiedmer called Sounds and Silence (2010) which portraits exemplary the daily work of Manfred Eicher with various musicians including Arvo Pärt, Nik Bärtsch, Anouar Brahem, Dino Saluzzi and Anja Lechner, Jan Garbarek and Kim Kashkashian or Gianluigi Trovesi and Gianni Coscia. The soundtrack with tracks from the recording sessions seen in the movie was as well as the documentary also released on ECM called Music for the Film - Sounds and Silence (ECM 2250). A documentary about reed player Charles Lloyd called Arrows Into Infinity (ECM 5052), directed by his wife Dorothy Darr together with Jeffery Morse, was released in July 2014. Another project from 2014 shows moving images by Prashant Bhargava with music by Vijay Iyer called Radhe Radhe: Rites of Holi (ECM 5507). In 2018 followed a portrait about Abercrombie called Open Land: Meeting John Abercrombie (ECM 5053), filmed by Arno Oehri and Oliver Primus. Besides these movies, ECM has also released concert videos of Karaindrou, Marc Sinan, Keith Jarrett solo and with his Standards trio.

== Record label of the year awards ==
- DownBeat: 1980, 2008–2010, 2012–2017
- Jazz Journalists Association: 2007, 2012–2014
- MIDEM: 2005, 2007
- JazzWeek: 2011
- JazzTimes: 2013
