= Manfred Eicher =

German record producer (born 1943)

- Born: 9 July 1943 (age 82); Lindau, Germany
- Genres: Jazz, classical
- Occupations: Record producer, musician
- Years active: 1969–present
- Label: ECM Records (founder)
- Website: www.ecmrecords.com

Manfred Eicher (born 9 July 1943) is a German record producer and the founder of ECM Records.

== Life and career ==
Eicher was born in Lindau, Germany. He studied music at the Academy of Music in Berlin. He started as a double-bass player of classical music and later became a record producer. In 1969, he founded ECM Records (Edition of Contemporary Music) in Munich.

Some of the jazz artists he has recorded over more than 50 years of his career include Paul Bley, Keith Jarrett, John Abercrombie, Jan Garbarek, Egberto Gismonti, Chick Corea, Gary Burton, Jack DeJohnette, Anouar Brahem, Dave Holland, Pat Metheny, Ralph Towner, Terje Rypdal, Steve Kuhn, Eberhard Weber, Jon Hassell, and the Art Ensemble of Chicago. The Köln Concert, a solo piano performance by Keith Jarrett, recorded and released by ECM in 1975, became the all-time best-selling jazz solo piano album.

In 1984, Eicher started a sublabel, ECM New Series, for classical music. Some of the artists whose work was released on the New Series were Steve Reich, Arvo Pärt, John Adams, Gavin Bryars, Meredith Monk, and the mediaeval composer Pérotin. The best-selling album Officium (1994)—the idea for which "occurred to Mr. Eicher while he was in Iceland to work on [the film] Holocene "—was a collaboration between Jan Garbarek and the Hilliard Ensemble, performing compositions by Cristóbal de Morales, Pérotin and others.

In 1992, Eicher co-directed and co-wrote the film Holozän (Man in the Holocene). In 2002 he wrote the score for the Israeli film Kedma.

Pianist Steve Kuhn has said of him: "If he likes you, Manfred is a wonderful producer. If not, you might as well make a record on the moon. Personally, I admire jazz musicians like Louis Armstrong, Ahmad Jamal and Count Basie, who showed that less is more. But before meeting Manfred Eicher, I hardly practised it myself." (Artist Interviews)

Eicher has produced most of the records released on his label. Each jazz record takes an average of two days to record and one day to mix. Most were recorded with Jan Erik Kongshaug (of Talent Studios and later Rainbow Studios in Oslo, Norway) as sound engineer. Eicher has produced more than a thousand albums to date.

"Eicher's deceptively simple aesthetic is unfailingly harmonious. He records musicians he likes, allows them to trust their own instincts, and plays a directorial role." (Jazz Review)

== Awards ==
- 1976 DownBeat: Producer of the Year
- 1986 German Record Critics Award
- 1998 Music Prize of the City of Munich
- 1999 Commander of the Royal Order of the Polar Star from the King of Sweden
- 1999 V Class Order of the Cross of St. Mary's Land from the President of Estonia
- 2000 Honorary Degree of Doctor of Letters by the University of Brighton
- 2001 Commander of the Royal Order of Merit from the King of Norway
- 2002 Grammy Award for Producer of the Year, Classical, nominated in the same category in 2003, 2004, and 2018
- 2007 Bundesverdienstkreuz (Order of Merit of the Federal Republic of Germany)
- 2008 DownBeat: Producer of the Year
- 2009 DownBeat: Producer of the Year
- 2010 DownBeat: Lifetime Achievement Award and Producer of the Year
- 2012 DownBeat: Producer of the Year
- 2013 DownBeat: Producer of the Year
- 2014 DownBeat: Producer of the Year
- 2015 DownBeat: Producer of the Year
- 2016 DownBeat: Producer of the Year
- 2017 DownBeat: Producer of the Year
- 2018 DownBeat: Producer of the Year
