= Silent Feet =

Studio album by Eberhard Weber / Colours
- Released: 1978
- Recorded: November 1977
- Studio: Tonstudio Bauer; Ludwigsburg, W. Germany
- Genre: Jazz
- Length: 42:18
- Label: ECM 1107 ST
- Producer: Manfred Eicher

Eberhard Weber chronology
The Following Morning (1976)	Silent Feet (1978)	Fluid Rustle (1979)

Colours chronology
Yellow Fields (1976)	SIlent Feet (1978)	Little Movements (1980)

Silent Feet is an album by German double bassist Eberhard Weber & Colours, recorded in November 1977 and released on ECM the following year. Weber's Colours Quartet features saxophonist Charlie Mariano, pianist Rainer Brüninghaus, and drummer John Marshall.

== Reception ==
The AllMusic review by Scott Yanow stated: "Emphasizing long tones, contrasting sound with silence... This music moves slowly and requires a lot of patience by the listener."

DownBeat reviewer John Alan Simon gave the album 4 stars. His review concludes, "Taken as a whole, Weber’s latest album is perhaps his weakest. But his strong points remain constant—a swirling evocation of aural landscapes, the creation of waking dreams for newly awakened sensibilities. If Weber's music puts some listeners to sleep, they were probably tired anyway".

Professional ratings
Review scores
Source	Rating
AllMusic	3/5 stars
The Penguin Guide to Jazz Recordings	3/4 stars
The Rolling Stone Jazz Record Guide	3/5 stars
DownBeat	4/5 stars

== Track listing ==
All compositions by Eberhard Weber.

1. "Seriously Deep" – 17:48
2. "Silent Feet" – 12:10
3. "Eyes That Can See in the Dark" – 12:20

== Personnel ==
=== Colours ===
- Charlie Mariano – soprano saxophone, flute
- Rainer Brüninghaus – piano, synthesizer
- Eberhard Weber – bass
- John Marshall – drums
