= Bright Size Life =

Studio album by Pat Metheny
- Released: March 1, 1976
- Recorded: December 1975
- Studios: Tonstudio Bauer, Ludwigsburg
- Genres: Jazz; jazz fusion; Americana
- Length: 37:06
- Label: ECM
- Producer: Manfred Eicher

Pat Metheny chronology
Bright Size Life (1976)	Watercolors (1977)

Bright Size Life is the debut album by Pat Metheny, recorded in December 1975 and released on ECM March 1st of the following year. The recording features his working trio with bass guitarist Jaco Pastorius and drummer Bob Moses.

== Background ==
The songs for Bright Size Life were written when Metheny was living in Boston and teaching at the Berklee School of Music. Metheny's mentor, the vibraphonist Gary Burton, helped Metheny arrange the songs and accompanied him to the recording session in Germany. Despite that, Burton never received a producer credit on the release.

Metheny and Moses had already been in the studio in Ludwigsburg in July for Gary Burton's Ring, who also released his work on Manfred Eicher's label ECM. Initially the trio rehearsed the material for the recording with Dave Holland on bass, because Eicher refused to have an electric bass on the recording. In the end he accepted Pastorius to play and, according to Bob Moses, even allowed Pastorius to overdub his theme on "Midwestern Nights Dream", a practice Eicher also was principally against.

Metheny has described the album as being "moderately successful" when it was released, selling around 900 copies, but it wasn't until 10–15 years later that it received wider recognition.

== Reception and legacy ==
Professional ratings
Review scores
Source	Rating
AllMusic	4.5/5 stars
The Rolling Stone Jazz Record Guide	4/5 stars
The Encyclopedia of Popular Music	4/5 stars
The Penguin Guide to Jazz Recordings	3/4 stars

In 2005, the first track was included on the Progressions: 100 Years of Jazz Guitar compilation on Columbia Records.

In the last edition of The Penguin Guide to Jazz in 2010, Brian Morton cited guitarist Martin Taylor, who said: "Bright Size Life was a turning point in jazz. Metheny took jazz into a direction that nobody else knew about." The guide's critique sees both first albums as atypical, since they depend more on their respective bassists (on the following Watercolors it is Eberhard Weber). Metheny's "clean, open tone" is compared with "such urban pastoralists as Jim Hall and Jimmy Raney", without often playing bebop licks.

In 2011, the first track was included on the Jazz: The Smithsonian Anthology compilation. In August 2020, the album was included in the Jazzwise list of "100 Jazz Albums That Shook the World".

In 2020, the album was deemed "culturally, historically, or aesthetically significant" by the Library of Congress and selected for preservation in the National Recording Registry.

== Track listing ==
All music is composed by Pat Metheny, except where noted.

Side I
No.	Title	Length
1.	"Bright Size Life"	4:45
2.	"Sirabhorn"	5:29
3.	"Unity Village"	3:40
4.	"Missouri Uncompromised"	4:21
Total length:		18:15

Side II
No.	Title	Writer(s)	Length
5.	"Midwestern Nights Dream"		6:00
6.	"Unquity Road"		3:35
7.	"Omaha Celebration"		4:18
8.	"Round Trip/Broadway Blues"	Ornette Coleman	4:58
Total length:			18:51 37:06

== Personnel ==
- Pat Metheny – 6- and 12-string electric guitar
- Jaco Pastorius – bass guitar
- Bob Moses – drums

=== Technical staff ===
- Manfred Eicher – producer
- Gary Burton – liner notes
- Martin Wieland – recording engineer
- Rainer Kiedrowski – cover photography
- Roberto Masotti – back cover photography
- Dieter Bonhorst – layout

== Charts ==
Year	Chart	Position
1976	Billboard Jazz Albums	28
