= Stages of a Long Journey =

Live album by Eberhard Weber
- Released: 2007
- Recorded: March 2005
- Venue: Theaterhaus Stuttgart; Baden-Württemberg, Germany
- Genre: Jazz
- Length: 73:29
- Label: ECM; ECM 1920
- Producer: Martin Mühleis

Eberhard Weber chronology
Endless Days (2001)	Stages of a Long Journey (2007)	Résumé (2012)

Stages of a Long Journey is a live album by German double bassist and composer Eberhard Weber recorded at the Theaterhaus Stuttgart in March 2005 and released on ECM in 2007.

== Reception ==
Professional ratings
Review scores
Source	Rating
AllMusic	4/5 stars
The Penguin Guide to Jazz Recordings	3/4 stars

The AllMusic review by Thom Jurek states, "This is a watershed moment in Weber's recorded output, because it reveals his collective gifts as a musician, which, even when understated, are shining examples of the European jazz, folk, classical, and new music he has forged these last 40 years as a leader and as a valued sideman and composer."

All About Jazz called it "A compelling retrospective that demonstrates the malleability, melodism and beauty of Weber's oeuvre, Stages of a Long Journey's omission of two words from its source—the bassist's "The Last Stage of a Long Journey," which receives an expansive and expanded orchestral treatment—makes it thankfully clear that this recording is simply a milestone, not an ending."

== Track listing ==
All compositions by Eberhard Weber except as indicated

1. "Silent Feet" – 7:37
2. "Syndrome" (Carla Bley) – 7:44
3. "Yesterdays" (Jerome Kern, Otto Harbach) – 5:03
4. "Seven Movements" – 5:54
5. "The Colours of Chloë" – 7:19
6. "Piano Transition" – 4:11
7. "Maurizius" – 7:04
8. "Percussion Transition" (Marilyn Mazur) – 3:03
9. "Yellow Fields" – 7:01
10. "Hang Around" (Reto Weber) – 4:17
11. "The Last Stage of a Long Journey" – 11:06
12. "Air" – 3:10

== Personnel ==
- Eberhard Weber – bass
- Jan Garbarek – soprano saxophone, tenor saxophone (tracks 1, 2, 4–9 & 11)
- Gary Burton – vibraphone (tracks 1, 2, 5–9 & 11)
- Rainer Bruninghaus (tracks 1, 2, 5–9 & 11), Wolfgang Dauner (track 3) – piano
- Marilyn Mazur – percussion (tracks 1, 2, 5–9 & 11)
- Nino G. – beatbox (track 10)
- Reto Weber – hang (track 10)
- Stuttgart Radio Symphony Orchestra conducted by Roland Kluttig (tracks 1, 5–9 & 11)
