= Little Movements =

Studio album by Eberhard Weber / Colours
- Released: 1980
- Recorded: July 1980
- Studio: Tonstudio Bauer; Ludwigsburg, W. Germany
- Genre: Jazz
- Length: 43:07
- Label: ECM 1186 ST
- Producer: Manfred Eicher

Eberhard Weber chronology
| Fluid Rustle (1978) | Little Movements (1980) | Later That Evening (1982) |

Colours chronology
| Silent Feet (1978) | Little Movements (1980) |

Little Movements is an album by Eberhard Weber and Colours, recorded in July 1980 and released on ECM the following year. Weber's Colours Quartet features saxophonist Charlie Mariano, pianist Rainer Brüninghaus, and drummer John Marshall.

== Reception ==
The AllMusic review by Scott Yanow stated that "the generally introspective music develops slowly and the occasional fiery moments are outnumbered by the quiet spots. A close listen does reveal some fine playing but most jazz collectors will probably think of this set as being superior background music."

Professional ratings
Review scores
| Source | Rating |
|---|---|
| AllMusic | 3/5 stars |
| The Penguin Guide to Jazz Recordings | 3.5/4 stars |
| The Rolling Stone Jazz Record Guide | 3/5 stars |

== Track listing ==
All compositions by Eberhard Weber except as noted.

1. "The Last Stage of a Long Journey" – 9:36
2. "Bali" (Rainer Brüninghaus) – 12:26
3. "A Dark Spell" – 8:23
4. "Little Movements" – 7:26
5. ""No Trees?" He Said" – 5:01

== Personnel ==
=== Colours ===
- Charlie Mariano – soprano saxophone, flute
- Rainer Brüninghaus – piano, synthesizer
- Eberhard Weber – bass
- John Marshall – drums, percussion
