= I Took Up the Runes =

Studio album by Jan Garbarek
- Released: 1990
- Recorded: August 1990
- Genre: Jazz
- Length: 60:46
- Label: ECM; ECM 1419

Jan Garbarek chronology
Legend of the Seven Dreams (1988)	I Took Up the Runes (1990)	Ragas and Sagas (1990)

I Took Up the Runes is an album by Norwegian saxophonist Jan Garbarek recorded August 1990 and released on ECM later that year. The quintet features pianist Rainer Brüninghaus, bassist Eberhard Weber, percussionist Nana Vasconcelos and drummer Manu Katché, with keyboardist Bugge Wesseltoft and singer Ingor Ánte Áilo Gaup.

== Reception ==
In a contemporaneous review for Keyboard, Jim Aikin described the album as a "hauntingly evocative Euro-jazz session" and identified "Gula Gula" as "especially memorable".

The AllMusic review by Mark W. B. Allender awards the album 3½ stars and states "A more eclectic release than his preceding releases, Jan Garbarek's I Took Up the Runes satisfies listeners who had been more or less impatient for something with some meat and some muscle... A sign of good things to come."

Professional ratings
Review scores
Source	Rating
AllMusic	3.5/5 stars
The Penguin Guide to Jazz Recordings	3/4 stars

== Track listing ==
All compositions by Jan Garbarek except as noted.

1. "Gula Gula" (Mari Boine) – 5:55
2. "Molde Canticle: Part 1" – 5:13
3. "Molde Canticle: Part 2" – 5:43
4. "Molde Canticle: Part 3" – 9:54
5. "Molde Canticle: Part 4" – 5:10
6. "Molde Canticle: part 5" – 6:06
7. "His Eyes Were Suns" (Traditional) – 6:04
8. "I Took Up the Runes" – 5:24
9. "Buena hora, buenos vientos" – 8:51
10. "Rahkki Sruvvis" (Ingor Ánte Áilo Gaup) – 2:26

== Personnel ==
- Jan Garbarek – tenor saxophone, soprano saxophone
- Rainer Brüninghaus – piano
- Eberhard Weber – bass
- Nana Vasconcelos – percussion
- Manu Katché – drums

=== Additional musicians ===
- Bugge Wesseltoft – synthesizer
- Ingor Ánte Áilo Gaup – voice
