= Michael Di Pasqua =

American jazz musician

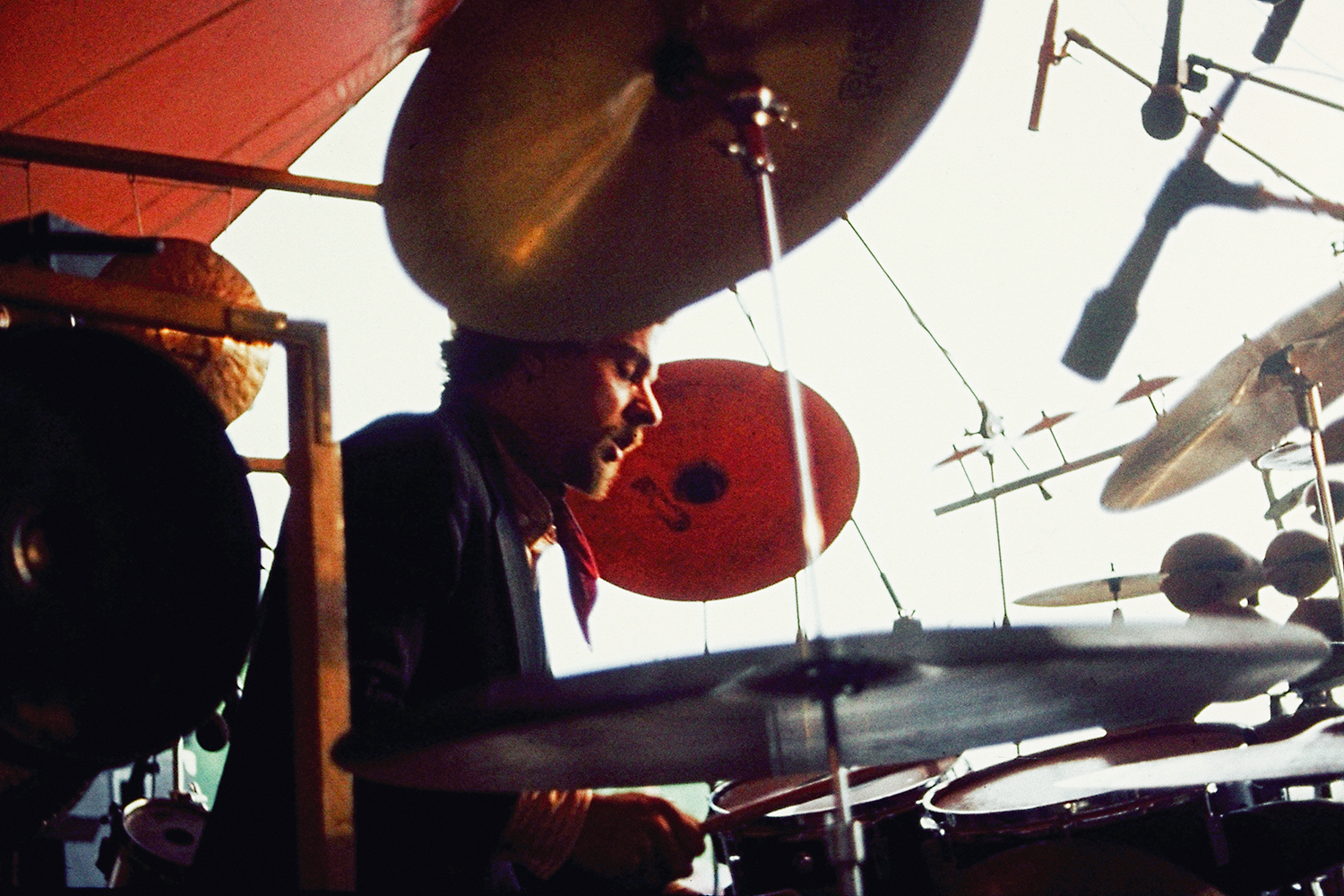
Michael Di Pasqua, at International New Jazz Festival Moers 1978 (Moers Festival)

Michael Di Pasqua (May 4, 1953 – August 29, 2016) was an American cool jazz drummer and percussionist born in Orlando, Florida, probably better known for his work with Zoot Sims, Al Cohn and Gerry Mulligan, among others.

== Discography ==
=== As leader ===
- Double Image, Double Image (Inner City, 1977)
- Double Image, Dawn (ECM, 1979)
- Gallery, Gallery (ECM, 1981)

=== As sideman ===
With Jan Garbarek

- Wayfarer (ECM, 1983)
- It's OK to Listen to the Gray Voice (ECM, 1985)

With Eberhard Weber

- Later That Evening (ECM, 1982)
- Endless Days (ECM, 2001)
- Résumé (ECM, 2012)

With others

- Siegfried Fietz, Ueber Den Tod Hinaus (Abakus, 1983)
- Volker Kriegel, Schoene Aussichten (Mood, 1983)
- Marian McPartland, Live at the Carlyle (Prevue, 1999)
- Gerry Mulligan, Watching & Waiting (DRG, 1999)
- Adelhard Roidinger, Schattseite (ECM, 1982)
- Ralph Towner, Old Friends, New Friends (ECM, 1979)
