= Endless Days =

Endless Days may refer to:

- "Endless Days" (song), a song by Linda McCartney from the album Wide Prairie
- Endless Days (album), an album by Eberhard Weber
