= Intrude =

Intrude may refer to:

- Intrusive rock
- "Intrude", a song from Ring (Gary Burton album), 1974
