= Freigeweht =

Studio album by Rainer Brüninghaus
- Released: 1981
- Recorded: August 1980
- Studio: Talent Studio; Oslo, Norway
- Genre: Jazz
- Length: 50:32
- Label: ECM 1182
- Producer: Manfred Eicher

Rainer Brüninghaus chronology
Freigeweht (1981)	Continuum (1984)

Freigeweht is an album by German keyboardist and composer Rainer Brüninghaus recorded in August 1980 and released on ECM the following year. The quartet features Kenny Wheeler on flugelhorn, Brynjar Hoff on oboe, and Jon Christensen on drums.

== Reception ==
The AllMusic review by Michael G. Nastos awarded the album 3 stars calling the six tracks "airy, minimalist compositions".

Professional ratings
Review scores
Source	Rating
Allmusic	3/5 stars

== Track listing ==
All compositions by Rainer Brüninghaus

1. "Stufen" – 8:24
2. "Spielraum" – 6:03
3. "Radspuren" – 10:52
4. "Die Flüsse Hinauf" – 8:37
5. "Täuschung der Luft" – 4:20
6. "Freigeweht" – 12:16

== Personnel ==
- Rainer Brüninghaus – piano, synthesizer
- Kenny Wheeler – flugelhorn
- Brynjar Hoff – oboe, English horn
- Jon Christensen – drums
