= Résumé (disambiguation) =

A résumé is a summary of a person's employment and education, used when seeking work.

Résumé or resume may also refer to:

- Résumé (album), a 2012 album by Eberhard Weber
- Resumé (magazine), a Swedish magazine
- Résumé, a 1999 album by John Taylor
