= Wayfarer (album) =

Studio album by the Jan Garbarek Group
- Released: September 1983
- Recorded: March 1983
- Studio: Talent Studio; Oslo, Norway
- Genre: Jazz
- Length: 46:28
- Label: ECM 1259
- Producer: Manfred Eicher

Jan Garbarek chronology
Paths, Prints (1982)	Wayfarer (1983)	It's OK to Listen to the Gray Voice (1985)

Professional ratings
Review scores
Source	Rating
Allmusic	3/5 stars
The Penguin Guide to Jazz Recordings	3/4 stars

Wayfarer is an album by the Jan Garbarek Group recorded in March 1983 and released on ECM September that year. The quartet features guitarist Bill Frisell and rhythm section Eberhard Weber and Michael Di Pasqua.

== Reception ==
The AllMusic review awards the album 3 stars.

== Track listing ==
Compositions by Jan Garbarek.

1. "Gesture" – 8:48
2. "Wayfarer" – 9:36
3. "Gentle" – 5:30
4. "Pendulum" – 10:24
5. "Spor" – 7:53
6. "Singsong" – 4:17

== Personnel ==
=== Jan Garbarek Group ===
- Jan Garbarek – tenor and soprano saxophone
- Bill Frisell – electric guitar
- Eberhard Weber – double bass
- Michael Di Pasqua – drums, percussion
