= Paths, Prints =

Studio album by Jan Garbarek
- Released: 6 September 1982
- Recorded: December 1981
- Genre: Jazz
- Length: 45:13
- Label: ECM; ECM 1223
- Producer: Manfred Eicher

Jan Garbarek chronology
Eventyr (1980)	Paths, Prints (1982)	Wayfarer (1983)

Paths, Prints is an album by Norwegian jazz saxophonist Jan Garbarek, recorded in December 1981 and released on ECM 6 September 1982. The quartet features rhythm section Bill Frisell, Eberhard Weber and Jon Christensen.

== Reception ==
The AllMusic review by Ron Wynn called the album "one of the better, more exciting releases—thanks to Bill Frisell."

Professional ratings
Review scores
Source	Rating
AllMusic	3/5 stars
The Penguin Guide to Jazz Recordings	3/4 stars
The Rolling Stone Jazz Record Guide	3/5 stars

== Track listing ==
All tracks are written by Jan Garbarek

Side I
No.	Title	Length
1.	"The Path"	7:11
2.	"Footprints"	10:06
3.	"Kite Dance"	5:35
4.	"To B.E."	3:10

Side II
No.	Title	Length
1.	"The Move"	6:39
2.	"Arc"	5:01
3.	"Considering the Snail"	6:30
4.	"Still"	6:18

== Personnel ==
- Jan Garbarek – soprano and tenor saxophones, wood flute, percussion
- Bill Frisell – guitar
- Eberhard Weber – bass
- Jon Christensen – drums, percussion
