= Encore (Eberhard Weber album) =

Live album by Eberhard Weber
- Released: 6 February 2015
- Recorded: 1990–2007
- Venue: Various
- Genre: Jazz
- Length: 45:17
- Label: ECM; ECM 2439
- Producer: Manfred Eicher

Eberhard Weber chronology
Résumé (2012)	Encore (2015)	Hommage à Eberhard Weber (2015)

Professional ratings
Review scores
Source	Rating
All About Jazz	4.5/5 stars
The Guardian	3/5 stars
The Irish Times	4/5 stars

Encore is a live album by German jazz double bassist and composer Eberhard Weber recorded at various locations between 1990 and 2007 and released on the ECM label on 6 February 2015.

== Background ==
Encore is a follow-up volume to his previous 2011 release Résumé. After suffering a major stroke in 2007 and unable to fully play ever since, Weber decided to remake his live solo recordings performed during the preceding two decades. He accompanied himself at the keyboards. Weber explained, "Encore is not made up of warmed-over leftovers. It's almost accidental that the first album had twelve pieces and the others were momentarily left out. To my mind the pieces were already finished; we just didn't mix them at the time. To avoid repetition, I invited the Dutch trumpeter Ack Van Rooyen for Encore. Here he plays his favourite instrument, the flugelhorn." The album contains 13 tracks with his bass solos that were recorded between 1990 and 2007 in 13 European cities. The material was mixed and edited at Studios La Buissonne in the South of France in November 2014.

== Reception ==
JazzTimes's Jeff Tamarkin stated, "Weber is now saying that this could be his final release. But as long as there are more solos in the vaults to be tapped, and his imagination remains intact, it need not be." In his review for The Guardian, John Fordham commented, " Encore is often as wistfully reflective as might be expected from the circumstances of its creation, but a thoughtful composer’s sensibility directed Weber’s work as both an improviser and a leader from the beginning - in these imaginative reconstructions, it still does." Cormak Larkin of The Irish Times wrote, "Ethereal, otherworldly but always compelling, it is a creative act of musical time travel and an elegy to a career that for many defined the much-vaunted ECM sound, heard here in all its pristine glory."

== Track listing ==
All tracks are written by Eberhard Weber

No.	Title	Length
1.	"Frankfurt"	2:47
2.	"Konstanz"	3:16
3.	"Cambridge"	4:16
4.	"Rankweil"	4:14
5.	"Langenhagen"	3:53
6.	"Granada"	2:57
7.	"Sevilla"	4:30
8.	"London"	3:00
9.	"Klagenfurt"	3:41
10.	"Bradford"	3:54
11.	"Edinburgh"	2:05
12.	"Hannover"	3:23
13.	"Pamplona"	3:17
Total length:		45:17

== Personnel ==
- Eberhard Weber – double bass, keyboards
- Ack van Rooyen – flugelhorn
