= Continuum (Rainer Brüninghaus album) =

Studio album by Rainer Brüninghaus
- Released: 1984
- Recorded: September 1983
- Studios: Talent Studio; Oslo, Norway
- Genre: Jazz
- Length: 44:30
- Label: ECM
- Producer: Manfred Eicher

Rainer Brüninghaus chronology
Freigeweht (1980)	Continuum (1984)	Shadows & Smiles (1987)

Continuum is an album by German keyboardist and composer Rainer Brüninghaus recorded in September 1983 and released on ECM the following year. The trio features trumpeter Markus Stockhausen and drummer Fredy Studer.

== Reception ==
Professional ratings
Review scores
Source	Rating
Allmusic	2.5/5 stars

AllMusic's Thom Jurek calls the album "meditative, inviting, full of rounded edges and melodies. It contains all the icy spaciousness of Manfred Eicher's trademark production, but the effect of Brüninghaus' compositions is warm, accessible even. They are open-ended and contemplative and explore musical questions lyrically. There is a valid argument to be made for the non-adventurousness of these works, and the fairly safe improvisations within them, but perhaps that's the point."

== Track listing ==
All compositions by Rainer Brüninghaus

1. "Strahlenspur" - 4:50
2. "Stille" - 10:27
3. "Continuum" - 4:00
4. "Raga Rag" - 10:49
5. "Schattenfrei" - 5:15
6. "Innerfern" - 9:30

== Personnel ==
- Rainer Brüninghaus – piano, synthesizer
- Markus Stockhausen – trumpet, flugelhorn
- Fredy Studer – drums
