= It's OK to Listen to the Gray Voice =

Studio album by the Jan Garbarek Group
- Released: September 1985
- Recorded: December 1984
- Genre: Jazz
- Length: 42:36
- Label: ECM 1294
- Producer: Manfred Eicher

Jan Garbarek chronology
Wayfarer (1983)	It's OK to Listen to the Gray Voice (1985)	All Those Born with Wings (1987)

Professional ratings
Review scores
Source	Rating
AllMusic	4/5 stars
The Encyclopedia of Popular Music	5/5 stars
The Penguin Guide to Jazz Recordings	3/4 stars
Record Collector	3/5 stars

It's OK to Listen to the Gray Voice is an album by the Jan Garbarek Group recorded in December 1984 and released on ECM September the following year. The quartet features rhythm section David Torn, Eberhard Weber and Michael Di Pasqua. The cover art is by Barbara Wojirsch.

== Reception ==
AllMusic gave the album four stars, with critic Mark W. B. Allender stating:

Here Garbarek is approaching the extremes of his style, appearing once again with the Jan Garbarek Group. All pieces on this record are titled after quotes from poems by Tomas Tranströmer, and though the actual connection to these poems remains tenuous at best, they do add a provocative element to the pieces themselves, which beg for at least some programmatic interpretation. Multi-instrumentalist David Torn is primarily responsible for the more aggressive edge this record takes. His guitar lines explode with energy and tension, giving Garbarek a more off-center field to play in—and considering his penchant for excessive restraint, this is a welcome environment to hear him in.

== Track listing ==
All compositions by Jan Garbarek.

1. "White Noise of Forgetfulness – 8:22
2. "The Crossing Place" – 9:10
3. "One Day in March I Go Down to the Sea and Listen" – 5:32
4. "Mission: To Be Where I Am" – 8:08
5. "It's OK to Phone the Island That Is a Mirage" – 5:49
6. "It's OK to Listen to the Gray Voice" – 4:41
7. "I'm the Knife-Thrower's Partner" – 0:54

== Personnel ==
=== Jan Garbarek Group ===
- Jan Garbarek – tenor saxophone, soprano saxophone
- David Torn – guitar, guitar synthesizer, DX7
- Eberhard Weber – bass
- Michael Di Pasqua – drums, percussion
