= Fluid Rustle =

Studio album by Eberhard Weber
- Released: May 1979
- Recorded: January 1979
- Studio: Tonstudio Bauer; Ludwigsburg, West Germany
- Genre: Jazz
- Length: 38:52
- Label: ECM 1137
- Producer: Manfred Eicher

Eberhard Weber chronology
Silent Feet (1977)	Fluid Rustle (1979)	Little Movements (1980)

Fluid Rustle is an album by German double bassist and composer Eberhard Weber recorded in January 1979 and released on ECM May that same year. The quintet features guitarist Bill Frisell—his first recording for the label—vibraphonist Gary Burton, and singers Bonnie Herman and Norma Winstone.

== Reception ==
The AllMusic review awarded the album 4½ stars. DownBeat assigned the release 4 stars. Reviewer Michael Zipkin wrote the album "paints tone poems in cloudy, pastel hues with round, deliberate strokes . . . These compositions are more odysseys than melodies, roaming over ever changing landscapes that, for all their worship of texture and tonality, manage to surprise and delight as often as they wander".

Professional ratings
Review scores
Source	Rating
Allmusic	4.5/5 stars
The Penguin Guide to Jazz Recordings	2.5/4 stars
DownBeat	4/5 stars

== Track listing ==
All compositions by Eberhard Weber

1. "Quiet Departures" – 17:29
2. "Fluid Rustle" – 7:28
3. "A Pale Smile" – 9:13
4. "Visible Thoughts" – 4:59

== Personnel ==
- Eberhard Weber – bass, percussion
- Bill Frisell – guitar, balalaika
- Gary Burton – vibraphone, marimba
- Bonnie Herman, Norma Winstone – vocals
