= Chorus (Eberhard Weber album) =

Studio album by Eberhard Weber
- Released: 1985
- Recorded: September 1984
- Studio: Tonstudio Bauer; Ludwigsburg, West Germany
- Genre: Jazz
- Length: 40:24
- Label: ECM 1288
- Producer: Manfred Eicher

Eberhard Weber chronology
Later That Evening (1982)	Chorus (1985)	Orchestra (1988)

Chorus is an album by German double bassist and composer Eberhard Weber recorded in September 1984 and released on ECM the following year. The quintet features saxophonist Jan Garbarek and drummer Ralf-R. Hübner, backed by woodwind players Manfred Hoffbauer and Martin Künstner.

Professional ratings
Review scores
Source	Rating
Allmusic	2/5 stars
The Penguin Guide to Jazz Recordings	3.5/4 stars

== Track listing ==
All compositions by Eberhard Weber.

1. "Part I" – 7:32
2. "Part II" – 5:31
3. "Part III/IV" – 8:03
4. "Part V" – 3:23
5. "Part VI" – 7:52
6. "Part VII" – 8:05

== Personnel ==
- Eberhard Weber – bass, synthesizer
- Jan Garbarek – soprano saxophone, tenor saxophone
- Ralf-R. Hübner – drums
- Manfred Hoffbauer – clarinet, flute
- Martin Künstner – oboe, English horn
