= The Following Morning =

Studio album by Eberhard Weber
- Released: 1976
- Recorded: August 1976
- Studio: Talent Studio; Oslo, Norway
- Genre: Jazz
- Length: 40:48
- Label: ECM 1084 ST
- Producer: Manfred Eicher

Eberhard Weber chronology
Yellow Fields (1976)	The Following Morning (1976)	Silent Feet (1977)

The Following Morning is an album by German double bassist and composer Eberhard Weber, recorded in August 1976 and released on ECM later that same year. Weber is backed by pianist Rainer Brüninghaus and members of the Oslo Philharmonic.

== Reception ==
Professional ratings
Review scores
Source	Rating
AllMusic	3/5 stars
The Penguin Guide to Jazz Recordings	2/4 stars
The Rolling Stone Jazz Record Guide	4/5 stars

The AllMusic review by Paul Collins stated, "The absence of a drummer deprives The Following Morning of some of the drive and rhythmic shadings of other Weber releases. In some ways this is a more contemplative work, lingering longer upon the tones of the individual instruments... the album is quite subtle and slow to unfold. You might not pick up this album as often as some other Weber releases, but it can reward close listening."

== Track listing ==
All tracks are written by Eberhard Weber.

Side I
No.	Title	Length
1.	"T. on a White Horse"	10:52
2.	"Moana I"	10:10
Total length:		21:02

Side II
No.	Title	Length
1.	"The Following Morning"	12:04
2.	"Moana II"	7:42
Total length:		19:46 40:48

== Personnel ==
- Eberhard Weber – bass
- Rainer Brüninghaus – piano, keyboards
- Member of the Oslo Philharmonic – celli, French horns, oboe

=== Technical personnel ===
- Manfred Eicher – producer
- Jan Erik Kongshaug – engineer
- Maja Weber – cover design
- Dieter Bonhorst – layout
- Roberto Masotti – photograph
