= Twelve Moons =

Studio album by the Jan Garbarek Group
- Released: April 1993
- Recorded: September 1992
- Studio: Rainbow Studio; Oslo, Norway
- Genre: Jazz
- Length: 75:33
- Label: ECM; ECM 1500
- Producer: Manfred Eicher

Jan Garbarek chronology
Atmos (1993)	Twelve Moons (1993)	Madar (1994)

Twelve Moons is an album by the Jan Garbarek Group recorded in September 1992 and released on ECM the following year. The septet features rhythm section Rainer Brüninghaus, Eberhard Weber and Manu Katché, percussionist Marilyn Mazur and singers Agnes Buen Garnås and Mari Boine.

== Reception ==
The AllMusic review awarded the album 4 stars.

Professional ratings
Review scores
Source	Rating
AllMusic	4/5 stars
The Penguin Guide to Jazz Recordings	4/4 stars

== Track listing ==
All compositions by Jan Garbarek except as indicated.

1. "Twelve Moons" – 7:37
2. "Psalm" (Traditional) – 6:33
3. "Brother Wind March" – 10:20
4. "There Were Swallows" – 8:39
5. "The Tall Tear Trees" – 5:51
6. "Arietta" (Edvard Grieg) – 6:24
7. "Gautes-Margjit" (Traditional) – 11:58
8. "Darvánan" (Mari Boine) – 4:56
9. "Huhai" – 7:32
10. "Witchi-Tai-To" (Jim Pepper) – 5:43

== Members ==
- Jan Garbarek – soprano saxophone, tenor saxophone, keyboards
- Rainer Brüninghaus – keyboards
- Eberhard Weber – bass
- Manu Katché – drums
- Marilyn Mazur – percussion
- Agnes Buen Garnås, Mari Boine – voice
