= Old Friends, New Friends =

Studio album by Ralph Towner
- Released: November 1979
- Recorded: July 1979
- Studio: Talent Studios; Oslo, Norway
- Genre: Jazz
- Length: 41:53
- Label: ECM 1153
- Producer: Manfred Eicher

Ralph Towner chronology
Batik (1978)	Old Friends, New Friends (1979)	Solo Concert (1980)

Old Friends, New Friends is an album by guitarist Ralph Towner, recorded in July 1979 and released on ECM Records in November of the same year. The quintet features trumpeter Kenny Wheeler, cellist David Darling and rhythm section Eddie Gómez and Michael Di Pasqua.

== Critical reception ==
Professional ratings
Review scores
Source	Rating
AllMusic	4/5 stars
The Penguin Guide to Jazz Recordings	3/4 stars
The Rolling Stone Jazz Record Guide	3/5 stars

The New York Times wrote that the album "voices trumpet, cello, bass and drums with the leader's rich acoustic guitar and piano in a variety of subtle and original combinations."

The AllMusic review by Scott Yanow called the album "an intriguing set well worth several listens."

== Track listing ==
All compositions by Ralph Towner

1. "New Moon" - 7:27
2. "Yesterday and Long Ago" - 7:51
3. "Celeste" - 4:54
4. "Special Delivery" - 7:04
5. "Kupala" - 8:05
6. "Beneath an Evening Sky" - 7:00

== Personnel ==
- Ralph Towner – twelve-string guitar, classical guitar, piano, French horn
- Kenny Wheeler – trumpet, flugelhorn
- David Darling – cello
- Eddie Gómez – bass
- Michael Di Pasqua – drums, percussion
