= Pendulum (Eberhard Weber album) =

Studio album by Eberhard Weber
- Released: 1993
- Recorded: Spring 1993
- Studio: Munich, Germany
- Genre: Jazz
- Length: 53:29
- Label: ECM; ECM 1518
- Producer: Eberhard Weber

Eberhard Weber chronology
Orchestra (1988)	Pendulum (1993)	Endless Days (2001)

Pendulum is a solo album by German double bassist and composer Eberhard Weber recorded in 1993 and released on the ECM label.

== Reception ==
The AllMusic review by Scott Yanow awarded the album 4½ stars, stating, "Since he is a strong composer, covering a wide span of moods during this set of melodic originals and avoiding the use of his effects as gimmickry, Weber creates an introverted but accessible program whose appeal should stretch beyond just lovers of bass solos."

Professional ratings
Review scores
Source	Rating
AllMusic	4.5/5 stars
The Penguin Guide to Jazz Recordings	4/4 stars

== Track listing ==
All compositions by Eberhard Weber

1. "Bird out of Cage" - 5:04
2. "Notes After an Evening" - 4:15
3. "Delirium" - 5:20
4. "Children's Song No. 1" - 5:41
5. "Street Scenes" - 5:26
6. "Silent for a While" - 7:42
7. "Pendulum" - 8:41
8. "Unfinished Self-Portrait" - 4:34
9. "Closing Scene" - 6:36

== Personnel ==
- Eberhard Weber – bass

=== Technical personnel ===
- Eberhard Weber – producer, liner notes (German)
- Jochen Scheffter – engineer
- Dieter Bonhorst, Maja Weber – cover design
- Roberto Masotti – photography
- Maria Pelikan – liner notes (English translation)
