= Hommage à Eberhard Weber =

Live album by Eberhard Weber
- Released: September 11, 2015
- Recorded: January 23–24, 2015
- Venue: Theaterhaus Stuttgart, Baden-Württemberg, Germany
- Genre: Jazz
- Length: 69:45
- Label: ECM; ECM 2463
- Producer: SWR /ECM

Eberhard Weber chronology
Encore (2007)	Hommage à Eberhard Weber (2015)

Hommage à Eberhard Weber is a live tribute album celebrating German double bassist and composer Eberhard Weber's 75th birthday recorded by the German public broadcaster SWR in Stuttgart in 2015 featuring Pat Metheny, Jan Garbarek, Gary Burton, Scott Colley, Danny Gottlieb, Paul McCandless, with Michael Gibbs and Helge Sunde conducting the SWR Big Band which was released on the ECM label.

== Reception ==
Professional ratings
Review scores
Source	Rating
AllMusic	3.5/5 stars
All About Jazz	4.5/5 stars
Elmore	95/100
Daily Telegraph	5/5 stars
The Guardian	3/5 stars
The Irish Times	4/5 stars
Stuff.co.nz	5/5 stars

The AllMusic review by Thom Jurek states, "Weber witnessed this concert from the seats; he was by all accounts not only pleased, but moved. This is an understandable response to Hommage à Eberhard Weber, which not only proves an exception to by-the-numbers tribute recordings, but stands as a daunting, creative, and enduring extension of the bassist's work". On All About Jazz, John Kelman said "Weber is not just all over this record in the various compositions that have been drawn from nearly his entire career, arranged for a series of guests and the SWR Big Band, but he is actually heard—and, for those fortunate enough to have been there, seen— performing in the form of archival video recordings played on a large screen hung above the stage: video samples, then, rather than merely audio samples ... Hommage à Eberhard Weber honors Weber in a way that both appreciates and respects ... and couldn't be a more perfect tribute—or a more perfect gift—to this uniquely talented and influential bassist/composer". The Guardian's John Fordham stated "Weber's sparing themes and subtle tone-poetry are perhaps better suited to small bands than orchestras, but there's a lot of heartfelt and often beautiful music here for his admirers". In The Irish Times, Cormac Larkin noted "Hommage is more than a tribute – it breathes new life into the playing of one of the founding fathers of European jazz". The Telegraph concert review by Sebastian Scotney stated "this weekend's 75th birthday concerts in Stuttgart for the German bassist Eberhard Weber are going to take some beating as the jazz events of the year".

== Track listing ==
All music is composed by Eberhard Weber except where noted.

No.	Title	Writer(s)	Length
1.	"Résumé Variations"	Jan Garbarek, Eberhard Weber	8:00
2.	"Hommage"	Pat Metheny	31:33
3.	"Touch"		8:19
4.	"Maurizius"		9:26
5.	"Tübingen"		6:55
6.	"Notes After an Evening"		5:32
Total length:			69:45

== Personnel ==
- Eberhard Weber – bass (from tapes)
- Pat Metheny – guitars
- Klaus-Peter Schöpfer – guitars
- Jan Garbarek – soprano saxophone
- Gary Burton – vibraphone
- Scott Colley – double bass
- Decebal Badila – bass
- Danny Gottlieb – drums
- Guido Jöris – drums, Percussion
- Klaus Wagenleiter – Piano, Keyboards
- Paul McCandless – English horn, soprano saxophone
- Klaus Graf – alto saxophone, soprano saxophone, clarinet
- Axel Kühn – Tenor Saxophone, Flute, Piccolo Flute, Clarinet
- Ian Cumming, Marc Godfroid – trombone
- Georg Maus – Bass Trombone
- Matthias Erlewein – Alto Saxophone, Flute, Piccolo Flute, clarinet
- Pierre Paquette – Baritone Saxophone, Bass Clarinet
- Felice Civitareale, Karl Farrent, Martin Auer, Nemanja Jovanovic, Rudi Reindl – Trumpet, Flugelhorn
- Andi Maile – Tenor Saxophone, Soprano Saxophone, Alto Flute, Clarinet
- Ernst Hutter – euphonium, trombone
- SWR Big Band conducted by Helge Sunde
- Michael Gibbs – arranger, conductor (track 4)
- Ralf Schmid (track 3), Libor Šíma (track 6), Rainer Tempel (track 5) – arranger

== Technical ==
- Martin Mühleis – producer
- Eberhard Weber, Pat Metheny – liner notes
- Doris Hauser, Volker Neumann and Boris Kellenbenz – recording
- Pete Karam – mixing
- Christoph Stickel – mastering
- Bernd Kuchenbeiser – design
