= Later That Evening =

Studio album by Eberhard Weber
- Released: 1982
- Recorded: March 1982
- Studio: Tonstudio Bauer; Ludwigsburg, W. Germany
- Genre: Jazz
- Length: 43:02
- Label: ECM; ECM 1231
- Producer: Manfred Eicher

Eberhard Weber chronology
Little Movements (1980)	Later That Evening (1982)	Chorus (1984)

Later That Evening is an album by German double bassist and composer Eberhard Weber, which was recorded in March 1982 and released on ECM later that year. The quintet features reed player Paul McCandless, percussionist Michael Di Pasqua, guitarist Bill Frisell, and pianist Lyle Mays.

== Reception ==
Professional ratings
Review scores
Source	Rating
AllMusic	4/5 stars
The Penguin Guide to Jazz Recordings	2.5/4 stars

The AllMusic review by Scott Yanow awarded the album 4 stars, stating, "This is one of bassist Eberhard Weber's more stimulating ECM releases, due in part to his colorful sidemen."

== Track listing ==
All tracks are written by Eberhard Weber

Side I
No.	Title	Length
1.	"Maurizius"	8:11
2.	"Death in the Carwash"	16:39

Side II
No.	Title	Length
1.	"Often in the Open"	11:35
2.	"Later That Evening"	6:37

== Personnel ==
- Eberhard Weber – bass
- Paul McCandless – soprano saxophone, oboe, English horn, bass clarinet
- Michael Di Pasqua – drums, percussion
- Bill Frisell – guitar
- Lyle Mays – piano
