= Watercolors (Pat Metheny album) =

Studio album by Pat Metheny
- Released: June 1977
- Recorded: February 1977
- Studio: Talent, Oslo, Norway
- Genre: Jazz fusion
- Length: 41:48
- Label: ECM
- Producer: Manfred Eicher

Pat Metheny chronology
Bright Size Life (1976)	Watercolors (1977)	Pat Metheny Group (1978)

Watercolors is the second album by American jazz guitarist Pat Metheny, recorded in February 1977 and released on ECM in June 1977. Metheny's quartet includes Lyle Mays, Eberhard Weber and Danny Gottlieb.

== Reception ==
Professional ratings
Review scores
Source	Rating
AllMusic	4/5 stars
The Penguin Guide to Jazz Recordings	3/4 stars
The Rolling Stone Jazz Record Guide	3/5 stars
The Virgin Encyclopedia of Jazz	3/5 stars

The AllMusic review by Richard S. Ginell states, "Metheny's softly focused, asymmetrical guitar style, with echoes of apparent influences as disparate as Jim Hall, George Benson, Jerry Garcia, and various country guitarists, is quite distinctive even at this early juncture. Metheny's long-running partnership with keyboardist Lyle Mays also begins here, with Mays mostly on acoustic piano but also providing a few mild synthesizer washes."

== Track listing ==
All tracks are written by Pat Metheny.

Side I
No.	Title	Length
1.	"Watercolors"	6:28
2.	"Icefire"	6:07
3.	"Oasis"	4:02
4.	"Lakes"	4:43

Side II
No.	Title	Length
1.	"River Quay"	4:56
2.	"Suite": "I. Florida Greeting Song" "II. Legend of the Fountain"	2:30; 2:28
3.	"Sea Song"	10:18

== Personnel ==
Musicians

- Pat Metheny – 6-and 12-string electric guitar, 15 string harp guitar
- Lyle Mays – piano, occasional synthesizer
- Eberhard Weber – bass
- Danny Gottlieb – drums

Technical personnel

- Manfred Eicher – producer
- Jan Erik Kongshaug – recording engineer
- Henry Riedel – mastering
- Dieter Bonhorst – layout
- Lajos Keresztes – photography

== Charts ==
Year	Chart	Position
1977	Billboard Jazz Albums	28
