= Orchestra (album) =

Studio album by Eberhard Weber
- Released: 1988
- Recorded: May–August 1988
- Studio: Tonstudio Bauer; Ludwigsburg, W. Germany
- Genre: Jazz
- Length: 50:19
- Label: ECM; ECM 1374
- Producer: Manfred Eicher

Eberhard Weber chronology
Chorus (1984)	Orchestra (1988)	Pendulum (1993)

Orchestra is an album by German double bassist and composer Eberhard Weber, recorded between May and August 1988 and released on ECM later that year. The octet features brass section Herbert Joos, Anton Jillich, Rudolf Diebetsberger, Thomas Hauschild, Wolfgang Czelustra, Andreas Richter, Winfried Rapp, Franz Stagl.

== Reception ==
Professional ratings
Review scores
Source	Rating
AllMusic	2/5 stars
The Penguin Guide to Jazz Recordings	3/4 stars
The Virgin Encyclopedia of Jazz	3/5 stars

The AllMusic review by Ron Wynn awarded the album 2 stars, saying, "Glorious sound, little 'pure jazz' content though."

The authors of The Penguin Guide to Jazz Recordings state, Weber "splits the album between bass soliloquies and counterpoint with a chilly brass section, yet the prettiest piece on the disc is the synthesizer tune 'One Summer's Evening'."

Tyran Grillo, writing for ECM blog Between Sound and Space, commented: "Orchestra is Weber at his purest. A lovely exposition of his talents, technical and melodic alike. Certainly not the one you'll want to start with, but by no means a shabby place to spend the night before continuing on your journey."

== Track listing ==
All compositions by Eberhard Weber.

1. "Seven Movements" – 12:20
2. "Broken Silence" – 1:59
3. "Before Dawn" – 5:23
4. "Just a Moment" – 2:35
5. "Air" – 4:16
6. "Ready Out There?" – 5:09
7. "Too Early to Leave" – 3:07
8. "One Summer's Evening" – 4:09
9. "A Daydream" – 3:22
10. "Trio" – 3:58
11. "Epilogue" – 4:01

== Personnel ==
- Eberhard Weber – bass, percussion, keyboards
- Herbert Joos, Anton Jillich – fluegelhorn
- Rudolf Diebetsberger, Thomas Hauschild – French horn
- Wolfgang Czelustra, Andreas Richter – trombone
- Winfried Rapp – bass trombone
- Franz Stagl – tuba
