= Gula Gula =

Gula Gula ("Listen, listen")
- Cover of the 1989 Norwegian version on the Iđut label, with name Mari Boine Persen and title Gula Gula

Studio album by Mari Boine
- Released: 1989
- Recorded: 1989
- Studio: Rainbow, Oslo, Norway
- Genre: Nordic traditional, Folk
- Length: 34:35
- Label: Iđut
- Producer: Tellef Kvifte

Mari Boine chronology
Jaskatvuoa maá (1985)	Gula Gula ("Listen, listen") (1989)	Goaskinviellja (1993)

International edition
- Cover of the international version, with snowy owl image, no title and no attribution. Real World Records, 1990

Gula Gula: Hør Stammødrenes Stemme ("Listen, Listen: Hear the Voice of the Foremothers") is an album by the Sámi singer Mari Boine, recorded in 1989 and released on the Iđut label. It provided her breakthrough, making her internationally famous. It won a Spellemannprisen (Norwegian Grammy award) in 1989. Boine appeared on the 1989 version as "Mari Boine Persen", her Norwegian name; on later versions she used her Sámi name only.

Boine sings in a joik style, recalling traditional Sámi singing, on the album. Scholars have noted her Sámi background and the album's feminist message and its apparently ethnic sound, while debating the music's specific connection to Sámi tradition or ethnicity.

== Approach ==
The album notes state that the songs are rooted in Mari Boine's experience of being in a despised minority; the song "Oppskrift for Herrefolk" ("Recipe for a Master Race") is sung in Norwegian, unlike the rest of the songs which are in Northern Sámi. It speaks directly of "discrimination and hate", and recommends ways of oppressing a minority: "Use bible and booze and bayonet"; "Use articles of law against ancient rights". Other songs tell of the beauty and wildness of Sápmi (Lapland). The title track asks the listener to remember "that the earth is our mother". Boine described in an interview with Norwegian American how the songs came about:

I became very angry to our repression, to the fact that we were told that there was something wrong with our language and our culture. And it resulted in a sort of a volcano, in an explosion of songs that just came to me.

Boine sings in an adaptation of traditional Sámi style, using the "joik" voice, with a range of accompanying instruments and percussion from indigenous traditions from around the world. The instruments used include drum, guitar, electric bass clarinet, dozo n'koni, gangan, udu, darbuka, tambourine, seed rattles, cymbal, clarinet, piano, frame drum, saz, drone drum, hammered dulcimer, bouzouki, overtone flute, bells, bass, quena, charango and antara.

== Releases ==
The album was first released in 1989 on the Iđut label (as ICD891) with the author identified as "Mari Boine Persen", her Norwegian name; the cover showed an image of Boine's face and a multicoloured background. On the Real World Records 1990 release (as CD RW 13 and RW LP 13), she used her Sámi name "Mari Boine" only; the cover image was of the eye of a snowy owl. The album was remastered in 2003 on Boine's Lean label and by Universal Music (as 017 781-2), using the original Norwegian cover. It was reissued in 2005 on the EmArcy and Universal labels as 004400177, the cover showing Boine in Sámi dress on a white background. This was reissued in 2023 by Norse Music (as BNM071LP).

== Reception and legacy ==
=== Awards ===
The album won the Spellemannprisen (Norwegian Grammy award) for Boine in 1989.

=== Breakthrough album ===
The AllMusic review awarded the album 5 stars.

Professional ratings
Review scores
Source	Rating
AllMusic	5/5 stars
NME	7/10
Select	3/5 medals

Silje F. Erdal, for Norway's FolkMusikk organisation, described the album as Boine's breakthrough, especially when Peter Gabriel re-released it on his Real World label. She noted that it was commissioned for the Beaivváš Sámi Našunálateáhter theatre, and that the title song "Gula Gula", with its call to "hear the voices of the tribal mothers", has an "obvious feminist message".

Merlyn Driver, writing for Songlines thirty years after the album's release, comments that "If you've heard of just one Sámi musician, it's probably Mari Boine", and that her voice, "a bewitching combination of melancholy, vulnerability and strength, has never sounded more impressive than on Gula Gula".

The title song formed the first (instrumental) track of the Norwegian jazz musician Jan Garbarek's 1990 album I Took Up the Runes. The contemporary reviewer Jim Aikin called the track "especially memorable".

Siv Ellen Kraft notes Boine's family background, her family "unusually strict" followers of Laestadian Lutheran revival protestantism, "dominated by the Bible and doomsday". Music was entirely forbidden, except for hymns; in particular, the joik voice that Boine uses on Gula Gula "was connected to the devil himself", not least for its association with the pagan Sámi religion which preceded Christianity in the region.

=== 'Ethnic' sound ===
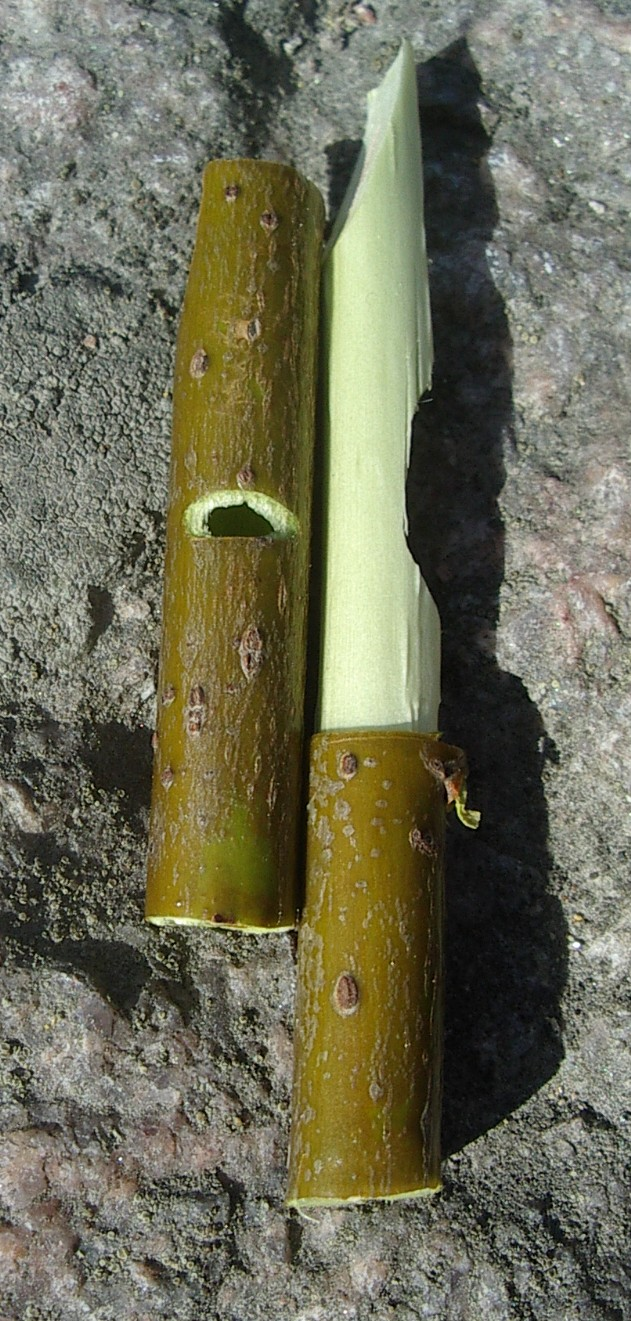
The seljefløyte, a Scandinavian willow flute, stands for a folk ethnic identity in Oppskrift for herrefolk.

In 2003, the musicologist Olle Edström called the album's lyrics "still highly political", but noted that the music had moved away from the traditional Sámi sound of her first album (After Stillness), with folk musicians from Sweden, Peru and elsewhere, making the album "World music", or more precisely in Edström's characterisation "a mixture of rock with quasi-West-African rhythms, with short phrases sung in a kind of Sámi/Native North-American technique and with rather few harmonies or drone-like harmonies". In his view, the musical forms are simple, with "the musicians playing 'ethnic' instruments such as the West African drums, mbira, Greek bouzouki, etc". He describes her singing style as "a special 'ethnic' voice technique of her own" that "reminds Samish listeners in part of traditional jojk technique and convinces European listeners that it is".

In 2011, the scholar of folk music Tellef Kvifte, who performed on the album, states that "to sound 'ethnic'" (his inverted commas) has become purely a matter of style, not necessarily relating to a specific ethnic group. Thus, he writes, Oppskrift for herrefolk (track 7) is accompanied by charango (an Andean stringed instrument) played by Carlos Quipse, "a Peruvian Indian", while the electric guitarist, Roger Ludvigsen, is like Boine ethnically a Sámi. Kvifte mentions, too, the seljefløyte ("willow flute"), an overtone instrument which hints at "a general Scandinavian folk ethnic identity". In his view, Boine was most likely aiming at a "multi-ethnic" music, including Quipse to express her solidarity with other oppressed peoples. He describes the role of the seljefløyte as taking part in "a kind of musical battle" with the electric guitar. In his view, the "Master Race" of the song's title is symbolised by the electric guitar, while the seljefløyte stands for the oppressed people. He questions the replacement of the electric guitar in the album's international version with a cimbalom (hammered dulcimer). The change may, he feels, have raised the song's "ethnic profile", but it increases the "conflicting ethnic signals". He concludes that sounding ethnic is part of a movement towards a global romanticism, in which sounding authentic is a value disconnected from actual ethnicity.

== Track listing ==
All tracks are composed and performed by Mari Boine. All are in the Northern Sámi language, except as indicated.

1. "Gula Gula" (Hør Stammødrenes Stemme/Hear the Voices of the Foremothers) – 03:40
2. "Vilges Suola" (Hvite Tyv/White Thief) – 04:15
3. "Balu Badjel Go Vuoittán" (Når Jeg Vinner Over Angsten/When I Win Against Fear) – 04:00
4. "Du Lahka" (Near You) – 05:14
5. "It Šat Duolmma Mu" (You Don't Step on Me No More) – 03:48
6. "Eadnán Bákti" (Klippen – til Kvinnen/To Woman) – 03:17
7. "Oppskrift for Herrefolk" (Recipe for a Master Race) – 03:54 (in Norwegian)
8. "Duinne" (Til Deg/To You) – 06:27

Bonus tracks on 2000 CD:

1. "Oarbbis Leat" (Fremmed Fugl/Alien Bird) – 05:31
2. "Čuovgi Liekkas" (Radiant Warmth) – 04:11
3. "Gula Gula" Chilluminati mix – 04:48

== Personnel ==
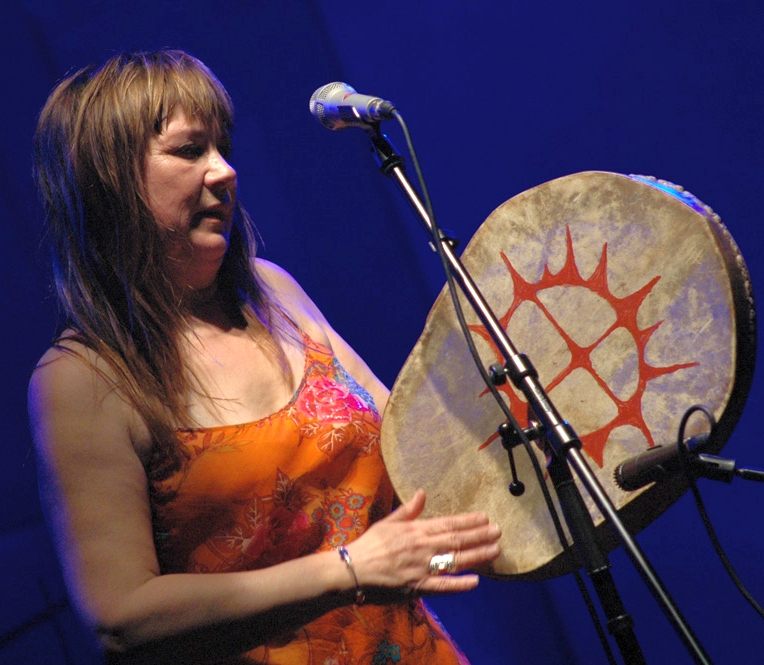
Mari Boine performing with a traditional drum in 2007

- Mari Boine – vocals, drum, guitar
- Eivind Aarset – guitar
- Christer Bo Bothen – electric bass clarinet, dozo n'koni, ganga
- Unni Shael Damslora – claypot (udu), darbuka, tambourine, seed rattles, cymbal
- Tellef Kvifte – clarinet, piano
- Roger Ludvigsen – guitar, breath, piano, frame drum, saz
- Ale Möller – drone drum, hammered dulcimer, bouzouki, overtone flute
- Gjermund Silseth – bells, bass, piano
- Leiv Solberg – bass
- Carlos Zamata Quipse – quena, breath, charango, antara
