= Rainer Brüninghaus =

German jazz pianist, composer and educator

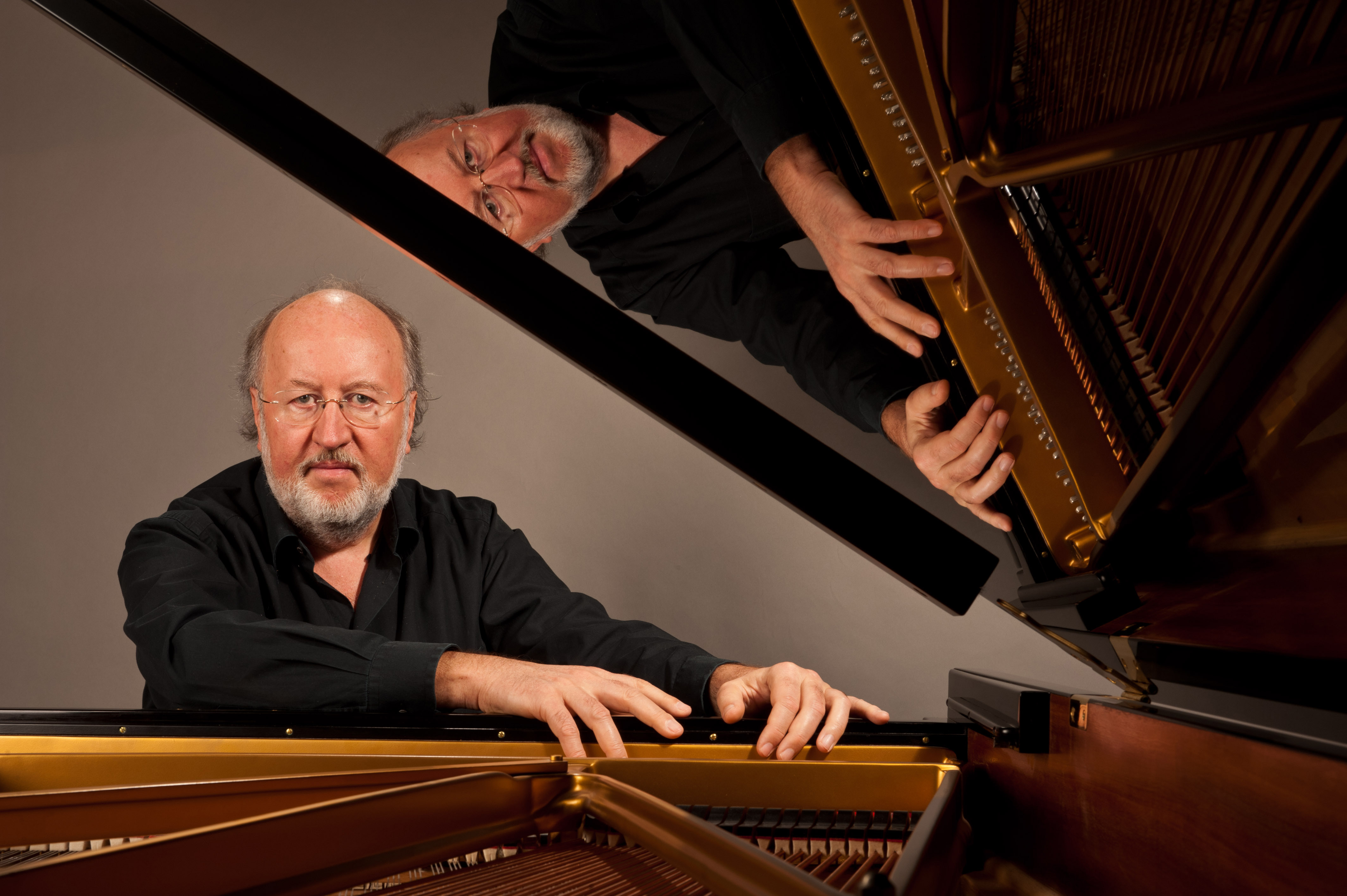
Brüninghaus in 2011

Rainer Brüninghaus (born 21 November 1949) is a German jazz pianist, composer and university teacher.

== Career ==
He was born in Bad Pyrmont, Lower Saxony, Germany. Rainer Brüninghaus was educated in classical piano, playing from the age of nine, and founded his first jazz trio when he was 16. From 1968 to 1972, he studied sociology at the University of Cologne and music from 1971 to 1975. In 1970, he founded the experimental jazz rock group Eiliff, which recorded two albums and one single. In 1973, he joined the band of German jazz guitarist Volker Kriegel. From 1973 until 1985, he was a frequent guest in the jazz ensemble of Hessian Broadcasting Corporation (hr) and in the big band of Hessian Broadcasting Corporation, hr-Bigband.

In 1975, with bassist Eberhard Weber and Charlie Mariano, he formed the band, Colours. From 1977 onward, he played duo concerts with Manfred Schoof and in his quintet and big band. In 1976, Brüninghaus first played a piano solo concert on the Heidelberg Jazz Days Festival.

At the German Jazz Festival Frankfurt of 1978, he performed a suite of pieces lasting 50 minutes, which he composed as a commissioned work for the festival. Jazz critic Joachim-Ernst Berendt wrote afterwards that he considered Brüninghaus one of the three leading German jazz pianists.

In the 1980s, Brüninghaus worked mainly as a bandleader, putting effort into his own projects, for example Freigeweht with Kenny Wheeler and Jon Christensen (ECM). In 1981, he founded his own trio in which Markus Stockhausen and Fredy Studer played until the end of 1984. This group toured worldwide, often for the Goethe Institute. John Abercrombie and Trilok Gurtu joined the band in 1985, and for some of the performances, Charlie Mariano, Hugo Read, and Jo Thönes played in the band. In 1988, he began a long association with Jan Garbarek. He has also worked with Carla Bley, Bob Brookmeyer, Gary Burton, Bobby McFerrin, Jim Hall, Manu Katché, Albert Mangelsdorff, Paul McCandless, Alphonse Mouzon, Archie Shepp, and Steve Swallow.

Brüninghaus has written music for symphony orchestra, big bands, small ensembles, and solo piano, as well as for film and television.

He taught piano and music theory at the Akademie Remscheid from 1973 to 1977, at the University of Cologne (Musikhochschule) from 1984 to 1992, and from 1990 to 1993 at the Hochschule (University) for Frankfurt University of Music and Performing Arts. He has published essays on music theory and was a member of the artistic advisory board for the Union of German Jazz Musicians (Union Deutscher Jazzmusiker/UDJ).

Since 1976, he has played solo concerts on grand piano, and has been doing so more frequently since 2011.

== Critics' observations ==
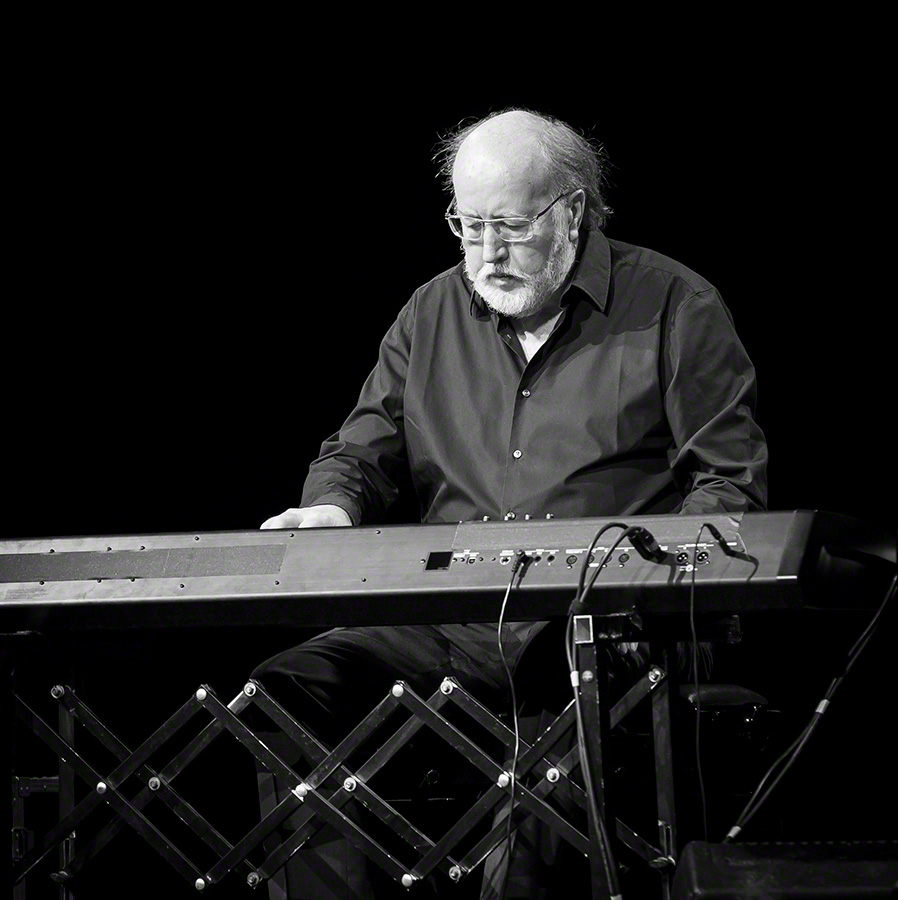
Rainer Brüninghaus at Oslo Jazzfestival 2016

Brüninghaus has become known in fusion jazz for his subtle chord layering and widely varying melodic changes, but without neglecting the rhythmical flow. Brüninghaus is the most imaginative exponent of minimal art. In his improvisation and compositions, he combines repetitive minimalist patterns with phrasing reminiscent of Bill Evans.

== Awards ==
In 1983, Brüninghaus won the Jazz Award of Southwest German Radio and the country of Rhineland-Palatinate, which at that time was the only German jazz award.

In 1984, he won the Award of German Record Critics for his ECM album Continuum.

== Discography ==
- Freigeweht, (ECM, 1980)
- Continuum (ECM, 1983)
- Shadows & Smiles with Manfred Schoof (WERGO, 1988)

With Jan Garbarek

- Legend of the Seven Dreams (ECM, 1988)
- I Took Up the Runes (ECM, 1990)
- Twelve Moons (ECM, 1992)
- Visible World (ECM, 1995)
- Rites (ECM, 1998)

With Eberhard Weber

- The Colours of Chloë (ECM, 1973)
- Yellow Fields (ECM, 1975)
- The Following Morning (ECM, 1976)
- Silent Feet (ECM, 1977)
- Little Movements (ECM, 1980)
- Endless Days (ECM, 2001)

== Bibliography ==
- Wolf Kampmann Reclams Jazzlexikon Stuttgart, Reclam 2003; ISBN 3-15-010528-5
- Martin Kunzler, Jazz-Lexikon Bd. 1. Reinbek 2002; ISBN 3-499-16512-0
