= Résumé (album) =

2012 live album by Eberhard Weber

Live album by Eberhard Weber
- Released: 2012
- Recorded: 1990–2007
- Venue: various locations
- Genre: Jazz
- Length: 47:18
- Labels: ECM; ECM 2051
- Producer: Manfred Eicher

Eberhard Weber chronology
Stages of a Long Journey (2007)	Résumé (2012)	Encore (2015)

Résumé is a live album by German double bassist and composer Eberhard Weber recorded at various locations between 1990 and 2007 and released on the ECM label.

== Reception ==
Professional ratings
Review scores
Source	Rating
AllMusic	3.5/5 stars
The Guardian	5/5 stars

The AllMusic review by Al Campbell states, "bassist Eberhard Weber has taken various solo pieces from live performances spanning 17 years with Jan Garbarek, rearranged them, and added other instruments to create new compositions. Since Weber can no longer play bass because of a stroke he suffered in 2007, the method he invokes on Résumé allows him to create new compositions and maintain his pensive creativity."

All About Jazz called it "an album that easily stands alongside the rest of his consistently fine discography, occupying an alternative musical universe that continues to sound—and resonate—like no other."

The Guardian's John Fordham stated "Résumé's appeal might mainly be to Weber's admirers, but that's a pretty large congregation—one that, to a man and woman, undoubtedly hopes to see him back on a stage one day."

== Track listing ==
All compositions by Eberhard Weber

1. "Liezen" - 2:45
2. "Karlsruhe" - 2:25
3. "Heidenheim" - 5:42
4. "Santiago" - 3:53
5. "Wolfsburg" - 3:27
6. "Amsterdam" - 4:20
7. "Marburg" - 4:08
8. "Tübingen" - 4:04
9. "Bochum" - 2:51
10. "Bath" - 4:33
11. "Lazise" - 4:09
12. "Grenoble" - 5:01

== Personnel ==
- Eberhard Weber - bass, keyboards
- Jan Garbarek - soprano saxophone, tenor saxophone, selje flute (tracks 6, 8 & 10)
- Michael Di Pasqua - drums, percussion (tracks 9 & 11)
