= Yellow Fields =

Studio album by Eberhard Weber
- Released: 1976
- Recorded: September 1975
- Studio: Tonstudio Bauer; Ludwigsburg, W. Germany
- Genre: Jazz
- Length: 44:19
- Label: ECM 1066 ST
- Producer: Manfred Eicher

Eberhard Weber chronology
Ring (Gary Burton album) (1974)	Yellow Fields (1976)	The Following Morning (1976)

Yellow Fields is an album by German double bassist and composer Eberhard Weber recorded in September 1975 and released on ECM the following year. The quartet features saxophonist Charlie Mariano, pianist Rainer Brüninghaus and drummer Jon Christensen.

== Reception ==
The AllMusic review awarded the album four out of five stars.

The Penguin Guide to Jazz awarded it the maximum four stars and placed it in their Core Collection, writing "Weber's masterpiece is essentially a period piece which nevertheless still seems modern. The sound of it is almost absurdly opulent: bass passages and swimming keyboard textures that reverberate from the speakers, chords that seem to hum with huge overtones. The keyboard textures in particular are of a kind that will probably never be heard on record again."

Professional ratings
Review scores
Source	Rating
AllMusic	4/5 stars
The Penguin Guide to Jazz	4/4 stars
The Rolling Stone Jazz Record Guide	4/5 stars

== Track listing ==
All tracks are written by Eberhard Weber

Side I
No.	Title	Length
1.	"Touch"	5:02
2.	"Sand-Glass"	15:34
Total length:		20:36

Side II
No.	Title	Length
1.	"Yellow Fields"	10:06
2.	"Left Lane"	13:37
Total length:		23:43 44:19

== Personnel ==
- Eberhard Weber – double bass
- Charlie Mariano – soprano saxophone, shehnai, nagaswaram
- Rainer Brüninghaus – piano, synthesizer
- Jon Christensen – drums

=== Technical personnel ===
- Manfred Eicher – producer
- Martin Wieland – engineer
- Maja Weber – cover
- Dieter Bonhorst – layout
- Gabi Winter – photography
