= Charlie Mariano =

American jazz saxophonist (1923–2009)

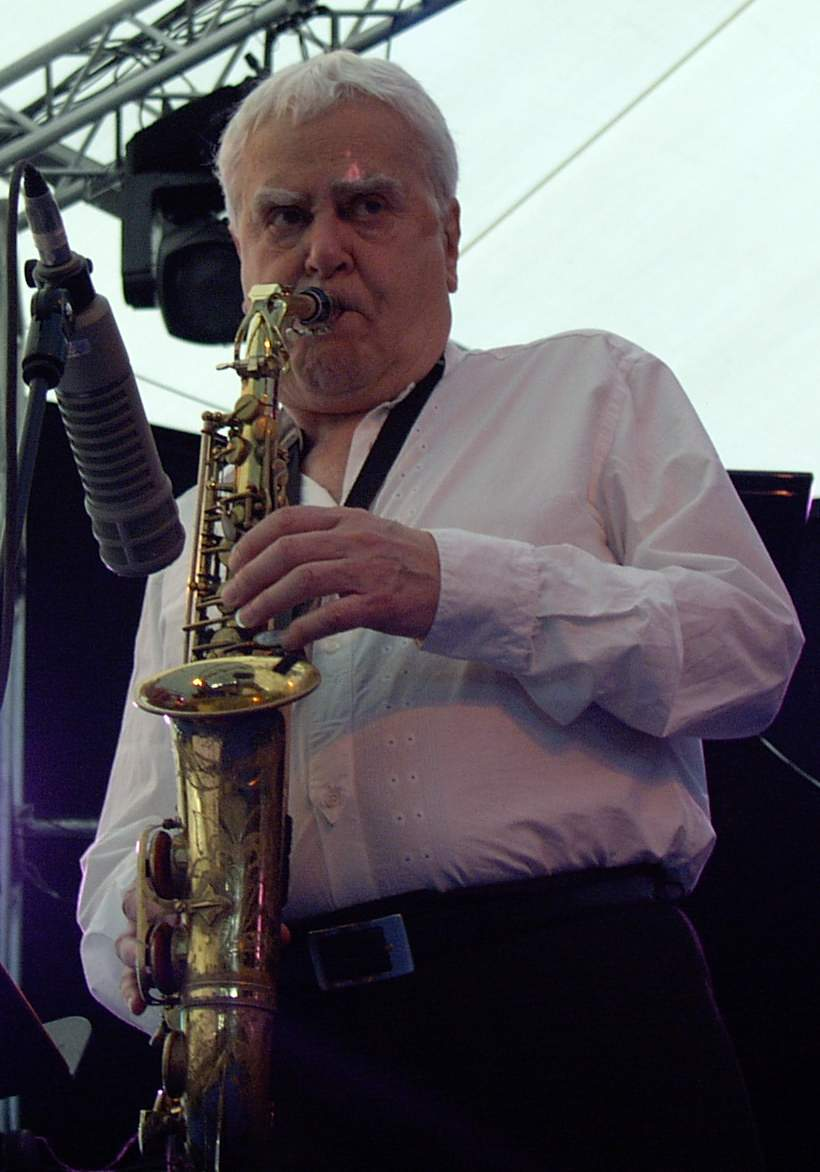
- Mariano at a 2003 concert

Background information
- Born: Carmine Ugo Mariano; November 12, 1923; Boston, Massachusetts, U.S.
- Died: June 16, 2009 (aged 85) Köln, Germany
- Genres: Jazz, jazz fusion, world music
- Occupations: Musician, composer
- Instruments: Saxophone, nadaswaram
- Years active: 1945–2009
- Labels: Bethlehem; Denon; Catalyst; ECM
- Formerly of: Stan Kenton, Embryo, Supersister

Carmine Ugo Mariano (November 12, 1923 – June 16, 2009) was an American jazz saxophonist who focused on the alto and soprano saxophone. He occasionally performed and recorded on flute and nadaswaram as well.

== Biography ==
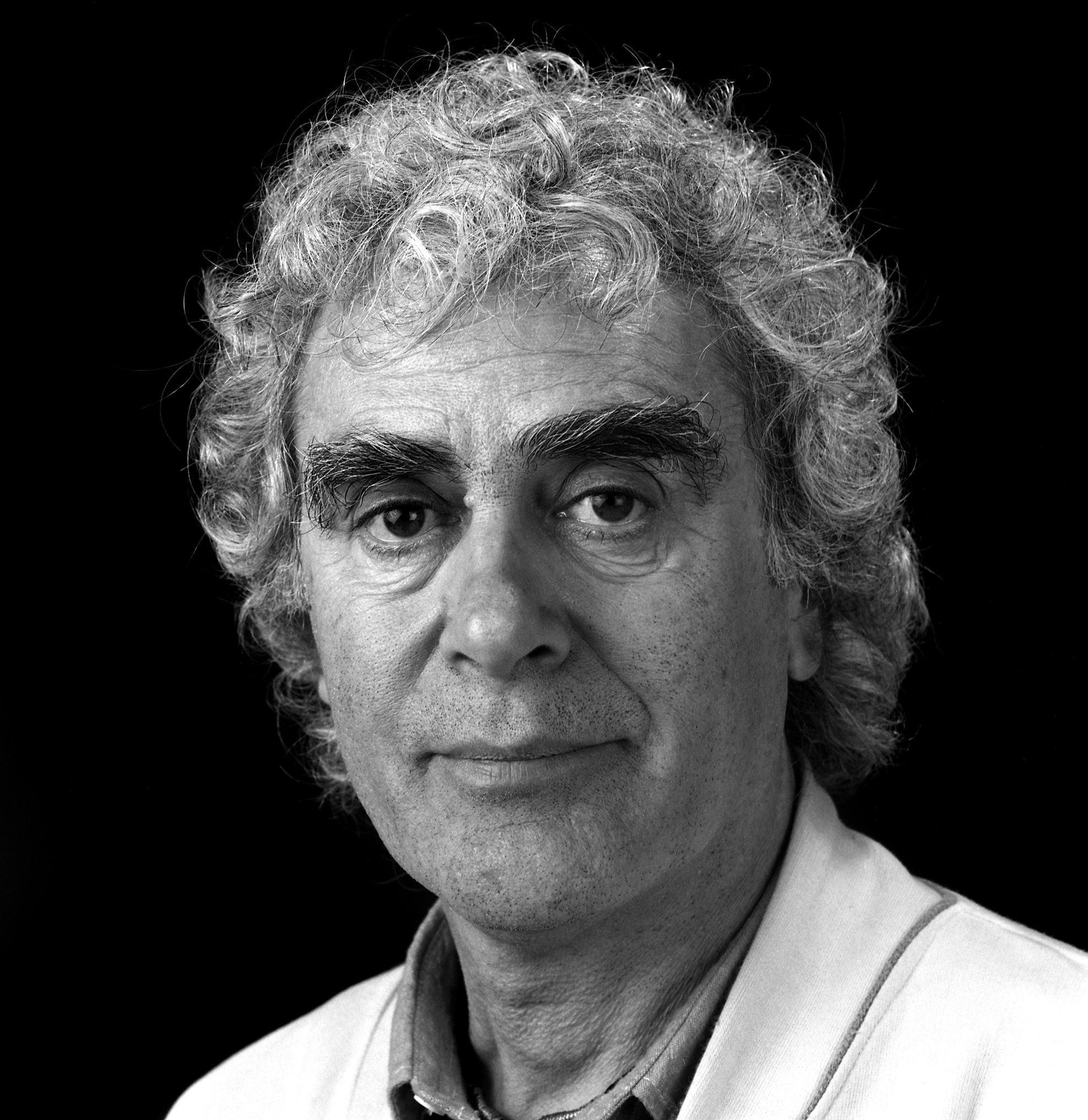
Charlie Mariano – portrait by Gert Chesi

Mariano was born in Boston, Massachusetts, United States, the son of Italian immigrants, John (Giovanni) Mariano and Mary (Maria) Di Gironimo of Fallo, Italy. He grew up in the Hyde Park neighborhood of Boston, enlisting in the Army Air Corps after high school, during World War II. After his service in the Army, Mariano attended what was then known as Schillinger House of Music, now Berklee College of Music. He was among the faculty at Berklee from 1965 to 1971. Mariano moved to Europe in 1971, settling eventually in Köln (Cologne), Germany, with his third wife, the painter Dorothee Zippel Mariano.

He played with one of the Stan Kenton big bands, Toshiko Akiyoshi (his then wife), Charles Mingus, Eberhard Weber, the United Jazz and Rock Ensemble, Embryo and numerous other notable bands and musicians.

His unusual application of the nadaswaram, a classical wind instrument from Tamil Nadu, was a notable occasional feature of his work in the 1970s.

Mariano had six daughters, including four with his first wife, Glenna Gregory Mariano: Sherry, Cynthia, Melanie, and Celeste, and was step-father to Glenna's son, Paris Mariano. Mariano is father to musician Monday Michiru with his second wife, Toshiko Akiyoshi. His youngest daughter is Zana Mariano. Mariano had seven grandchildren, and two great-granddaughters. Mariano died of cancer on June 16, 2009, at the age of 85.

== Discography ==
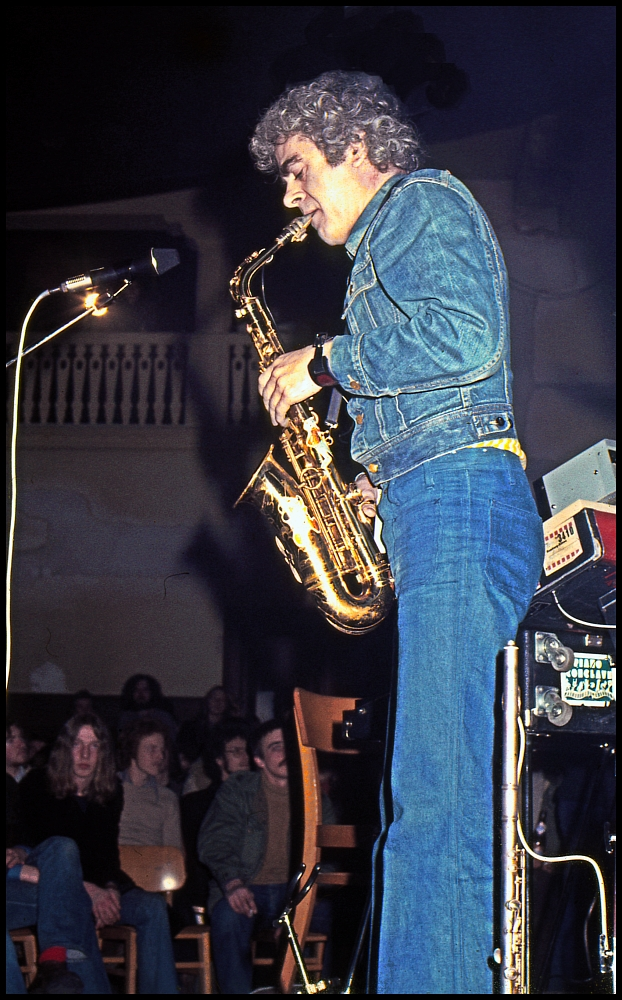
Mariano performing with Pork Pie, c. 1976, Foto: Christian W. Neumann

=== As leader ===
- Charlie Mariano With His Jazz Group (Imperial, 1950)
- The New Sounds From Boston (Prestige, 1951)
- Charlie Mariano Boston All Stars (Prestige, 1953) reissued on CD with New Sounds
- Charlie Mariano Sextet (Fantasy, 1953)
- Charlie Mariano (Bethlehem, 1956)
- Beauties of 1918/Something for Both Ears (World Pacific, 1957 [1958]) – co-led with Jerry Dodgion
- A Jazz Portrait of Charlie Mariano (Regina, 1963)
- Charlie Mariano & Sadao Watanabe (Victor, 1967)
- Mirror (Atlantic, 1972)
- Cascade (Limetree, 1974)
- Reflections (RCA Victor, 1974)
- Helen 12 Trees (MPS, 1976)
- October (Inner City, 1978)
- Crystal Bells (CMP, 1980)
- Mariano (Capitol/Intuition, 1988)
- Swingin' with Mariano (Affinity, 1990)
- Boston Days (Fresh Sound, 1994)
- Seventy (Intuition, 1995)
- Deep in a Dream (Enja, 2003)

=== As co-leader ===
With Osmosis

- Osmosis (RCA, 1970)

With United Jazz + Rock Ensemble

- Live im Schützenhaus (1977)
- Teamwork (1978)
- The Break Even Point (1979)
- Live in Berlin (1981)
- United Live - Opus Sechs (1984)
- Round Seven (1987)
- Na endlich! - Live in Concert (1992)

=== As sideman ===
With Embryo

- We Keep On (BASF, 1973)
- Surfin' (BASF, 1975)
- Bad Head And Bad Cats (April, 1976)
- Live Embryo (April, 1977)
- Life (Schneeball, 1981)
- 29.6.73 In Hamburg (Schneeball, 2003)

With Wolfgang Dauner

- Meditation on a landscape-Tagore (MOOD Records, 1986)

With Stan Kenton

- Contemporary Concepts (Capitol, 1955)
- Road Show (Capitol, 1959)
- Standards in Silhouette (Capitol, 1960)
- Viva Kenton! (Capitol, 1960)
- Live at Palo Alto (Status, 1990)
- Mellophonium Moods 1962 (Status, 1990)

With Shelly Manne

- Swinging Sounds (Contemporary, 1956)
- More Swinging Sounds (Contemporary, 1957)
- Concerto for Clarinet & Combo (Contemporary, 1957)
- The Gambit (Contemporary, 1958)

With Charles Mingus

- The Complete Town Hall Concert (United Artists, 1962)
- Mingus Mingus Mingus Mingus Mingus (Impulse!, 1964)
- The Black Saint and the Sinner Lady (Impulse!, 1963)

With Eberhard Weber

- Yellow Fields (ECM, 1976)
- Silent Feet (ECM, 1978)
- Little Movements (ECM, 1980)

With others

- Toshiko Akiyoshi, The Toshiko–Mariano Quartet (Candid, 1961)
- Toshiko Akiyoshi, Jazz in Japan Recorded in Tokyo (Vee Jay, 1965)
- Manny Albam, The Jazz Greats of Our Time Vol. 2 (Coral, 1958)
- Max Bennett, Max Bennett Plays (Bethlehem, 1956)
- Max Bennett, Max Bennett Vol. II (Bethlehem, 1956)
- Chet Baker, Theme Music from "The James Dean Story" (World Pacific, 1957)
- Philip Catherine, Guitars (Atlantic, 1976)
- Philip Catherine, End of August (WEA, 1982)
- Serge Chaloff, Serge & Boots/Plays the Fable of Mabel (Vogue, 1957)
- Peggy Connelly, Peggy Connelly (Bethlehem, 1956)
- Herb Ellis, Ellis in Wonderland (Norgran, 1956)
- Maynard Ferguson, The Blues Roar (Mainstream, 1964)
- Michael Gibbs, Directs the Only Chrome-Waterfall Orchestra (Bronze, 1975)
- Michael Gibbs, By the Way (Ah Um, 1993)
- John Graas, Jazz Studio 3 (Decca, 1954)
- George Gruntz, Theatre (ECM, 1983)
- Chico Hamilton, The Further Adventures of El Chico (Impulse!, 1966)
- Bill Harris, Bill Harris Herd (Norgran, 1956)
- Bill Holman, In a Jazz Orbit (Andex, 1958)
- Bill Holman, The Fabulous Bill Holman (Coral 1958)
- Jackie and Roy, Free and Easy! (ABC-Paramount, 1958)
- Elvin Jones, Dear John C. (Impulse!, 1965)
- Quincy Jones, Go West, Man! (ABC-Paramount, 1957)
- Quincy Jones, This Is How I Feel About Jazz (ABC-Paramount, 1957)
- Mel Lewis, Mel Lewis Sextet (Mode, 1957)
- Arif Mardin, Glass Onion (Atlantic, 1969)
- Rabih Abou-Khalil, Blue Camel (Enja, 1992)
- Vince Mendoza, Sketches (ACT, 1994)
- Modern Jazz Quartet, Jazz Dialogue (Atlantic, 1966)
- Pierre Moerlen's Gong, 1981 - Leave It Open (Arista Records, 1982)
- Mike Nock, Magic Mansions (Laurie, 1977)
- Nat Pierce, The Nat Pierce-Dick Collins Nonet/The Charlie Mariano Sextet (Fantasy, 1956)
- Herb Pomeroy, Band in Boston (United Artists, 1959)
- Irene Reid, Room for One More (Verve, 1965)
- Johnny Richards, Something Else by Johnny Richards (Bethlehem, 1956)
- Jimmy Ricks, Vibrations (Mainstream, 1965)
- Shorty Rogers, The Big Shorty Rogers Express (RCA Victor, 1956)
- Frank Rosolino, Frank Rosolino (Capitol, 1954)
- Frank Rosolino, Frankly Speaking (Capitol, 1955)
- Sal Salvador, You Ain't Heard Nothin' Yet! (Dauntless, 1963)
- Supersister, Iskander (Polydor, 1973)
- Fredy Studer, Seven Songs (Intuition, 1993)
- Harvie Swartz, Smart Moves (Gramavision, 1986)
- McCoy Tyner, Live at Newport (Impulse!, 1963)
- Edward Vesala, Nan Madol (ECM, 1974)
- Sadao Watanabe, Iberian Waltz (Intakt, 1967)
- Sadao Watanabe, We Got a New Bag (Intakt, 1968)
- Stu Williamson, Stu Williamson (Bethlehem, 1956)
- Stu Williamson, Stu Williamson Plays (Bethlehem, 1957)

== See also ==
- Izzy Ort's Bar & Grille
