= Mari Boine =

Norwegian Sámi singer (born 1956)

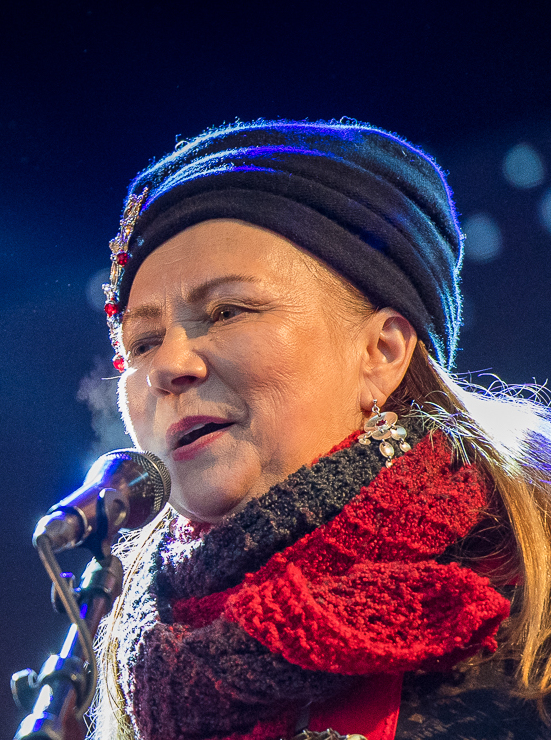
- Mari Boine performing in 2018

Background information
- Born: Mari Boine; 8 November 1956 (age 69); Karasjok, Norway
- Genres: Joik, folk rock
- Occupation: Singer
- Years active: 1980s–present
- Labels: Real World, Lean AS
- Website: mariboine.no

Mari Boine (born Mari Brit Randi Boine; 8 November 1956) is a Norwegian Sámi singer. She combined a form of Sámi joik singing with rock. In 2008, she became a professor of musicology at Nesna University College.

== Biography ==
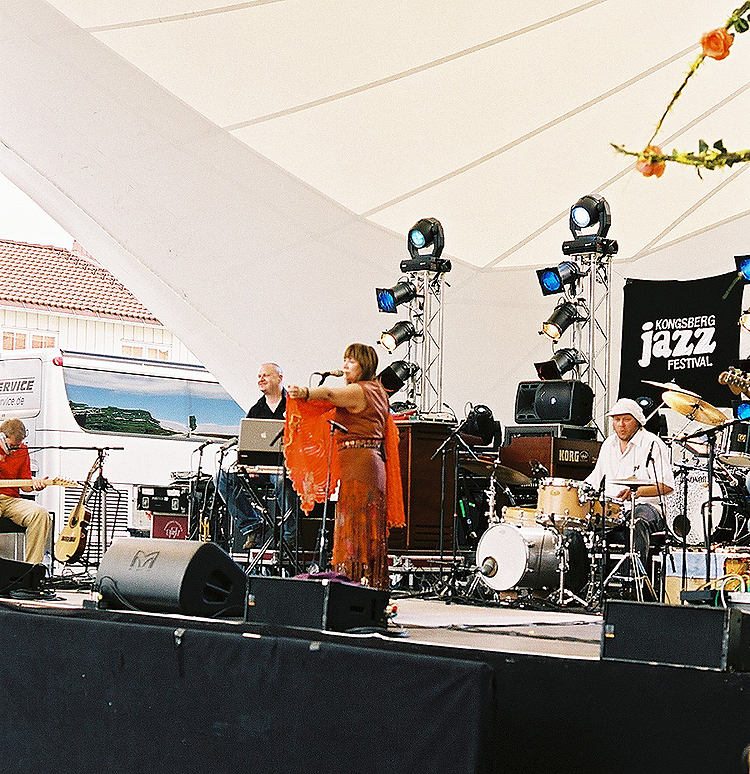
At Kongsberg Jazz Festival 2007

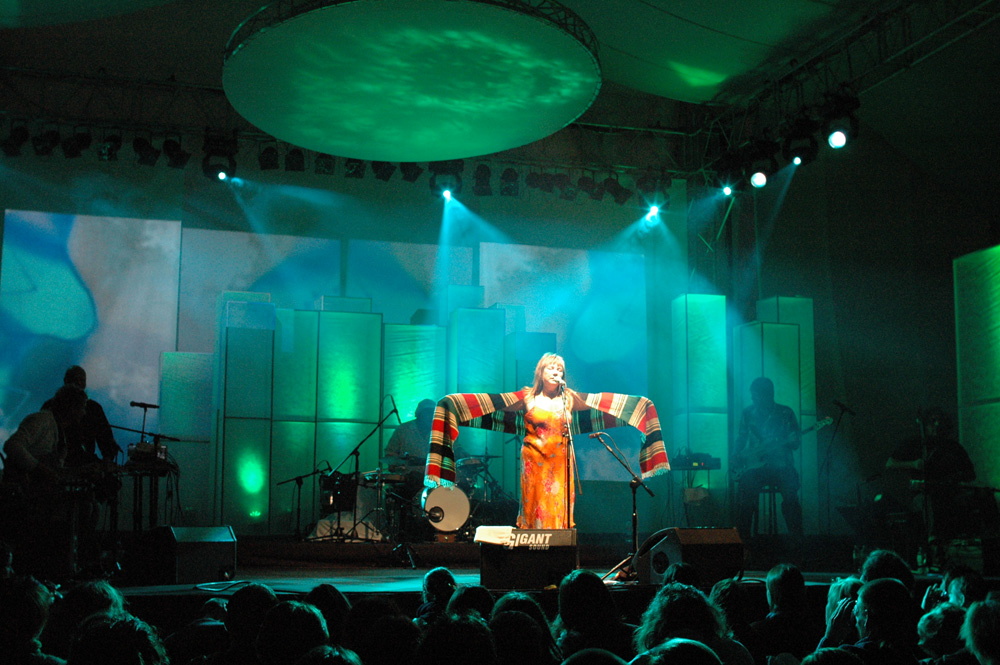
In Warsaw, September 2007

Mari Boine was born and raised in Gámehisnjárga, a village on the river Anarjohka in Karasjok Municipality, Finnmark county, Norway.

Boine's parents were Sámi who made their living from salmon fishing and farming. She grew up steeped in the natural environment of Sápmi, but also amidst the strict Laestadian Christian movement with discrimination against her people: for example, singing in the traditional Sami joik style was considered "the devil's work". The local school Boine attended reflected a very different world from her family's. All the teaching was in Norwegian.

=== Anti-racism ===
As Boine grew up, she started to rebel against the prejudiced attitude of being an inferior "Lappish" woman in Norwegian society. For instance, the booklet accompanying the CD Leahkastin (Unfolding) is illustrated with photographs with racist captions like "Lapps report for anthropological measurement", "Typical female Lapp", "A well-nourished Lapp"; and it ends with a photo of Boine herself as a girl, captioned "Mari, one of the rugged Lapp-girl types" and attributed "(Photo: Unidentified priest)".

When Boine's album Gula Gula, originally released on her Iđut label in 1989, was rereleased on Peter Gabriel's RealWorld label in July 1990, its front cover showed an iconic image of the tundra of the far north, the eye of a snowy owl. The front cover, unlike the 1989 version, did not show the name of the album, or the name or face of Mari Boine herself; the back cover printed the name 'Mari Boine Persen', the Persen surname identifying her as a Norwegian rather than a Sámi. On the 2007 release on her own Lean label, the album cover explicitly names Mari Boine with her Sámi surname, and shows her in traditional robes as a shamanistic dancer of her own people, while the white background, like the snowy owl of the original release, hints at the snows of the north.

Boine was asked to perform at the 1994 Winter Olympics in Lillehammer, but refused because she perceived the invitation as an attempt to bring a token minority to the ceremonies.

=== Musical style ===
Boine's songs are strongly rooted in her experience of being in a despised minority. For example, the song "Oppskrift for Herrefolk" ("Recipe for a Master Race") on her breakthrough CD Gula Gula, sung in Norwegian unlike the rest of the songs which are in Northern Sámi, speaks directly of "discrimination and hate", and recommends ways of oppressing a minority: "Use bible and booze and bayonet"; "Use articles of law against ancient rights".

Boine's other songs are more positive, often singing of the beauty and wildness of Sápmi, the Sámi lands of northern Scandinavia. The title track of Gula Gula asks the listener to remember "that the earth is our mother".

Boine sings in an adaptation of traditional Sámi style, using the "joik" voice, with a range of accompanying instruments and percussion from indigenous traditions from around the world. For example, on Gula Gula the instruments used include drum, guitar, electric bass clarinet, dozo n'koni, gangan, udu, darbuka, tambourine, seed rattles, cymbal, clarinet, piano, frame drum, saz, drone drum, hammered dulcimer, bouzouki, overtone flute, bells, bass, quena, charango and antara.

In 2017, she released See the Woman, her first English-language album.

== Reception ==
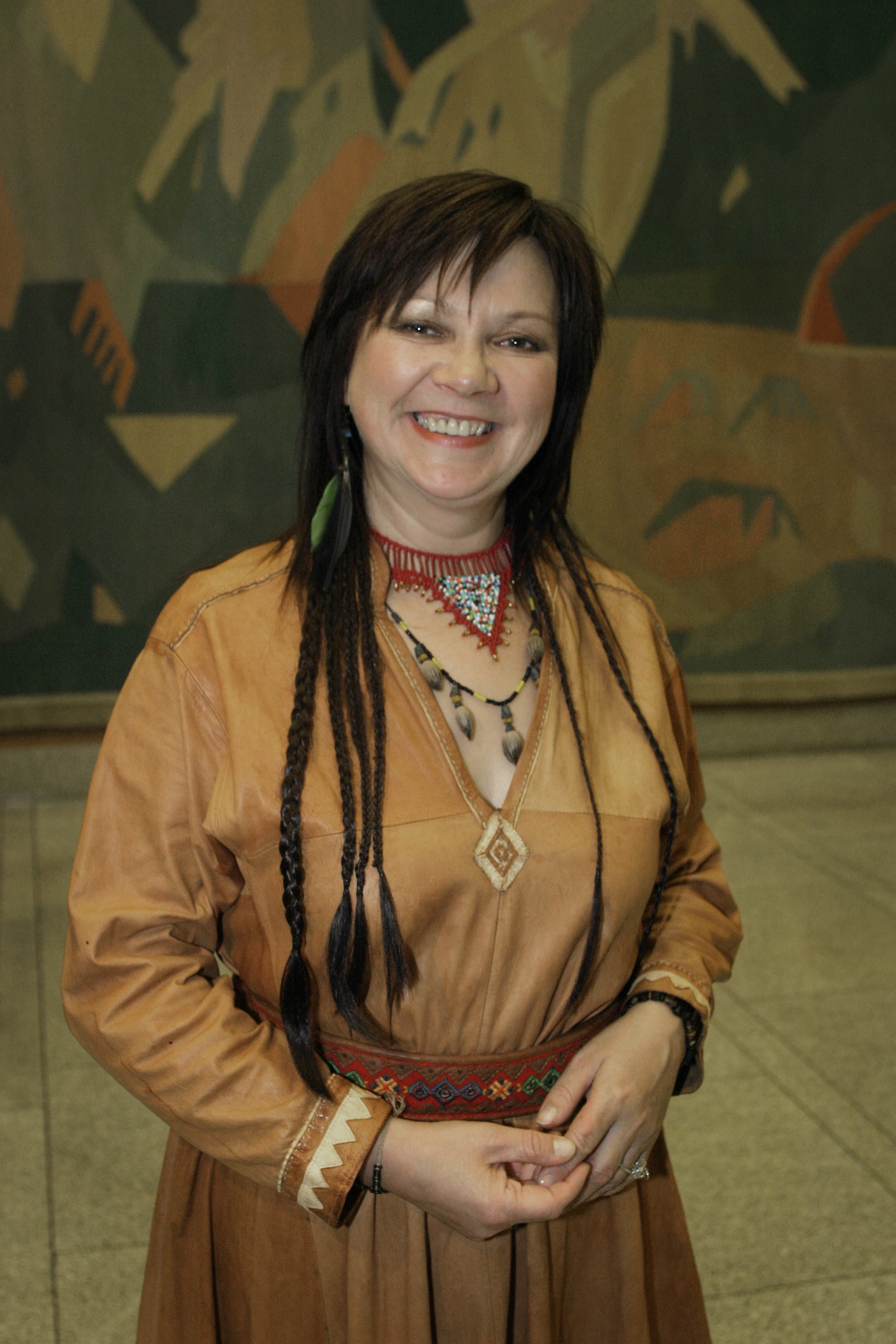
In Oslo, 2003

Rootsworld, interviewing Boine in 2002, described her as "an unofficial Sámi cultural ambassador".

The Guardian, in its 2010 F&M playlist of songs "they just can't turn off", describes "Mu Ustit, Eŋgeliid Sogalaš (My Friend of Angel Tribe)" with the words "Norwegian Sami singer Boine, with this soft, melancholy and utterly mesmerising song."

Johnny Loftus, reviewing Boine's Eight Seasons/Gávcci Jahkejuogu, wrote that "Boine seems to have been inspired, collaborating with producer Bugge Wesseltoft for a collection of pieces weaving her alternately supple and intimate, angry and otherworldly vocals into moody arrangements tinged with jazz influence and electronic programming." While there was a degree of cliché in that, wrote Loftus, it worked well, concluding: "Boine's voice, filtered at first behind the halting notes of a guitar, builds in strength over the brooding electronic rhythm, until her Joik overtakes the electronics completely, becoming fully responsible for the song's deep, chilly atmosphere. Let's see a keyboard's hard drive do that."

== Awards ==
In 1993, Boine became the first recipient of the Áillohaš Music Award, a Sámi music award conferred by Kautokeino Municipality and the Kautokeino Sámi Association to honor the significant contributions the recipient or recipients has made to the diverse world of Sámi music.

In 2003, Boine was awarded the Nordic Council Music Prize. She was appointed knight, first class in the Royal Norwegian Order of St. Olav for her artistic diversity on 18 September 2009. On 7 October 2012, Boine was appointed as a "statsstipendiat", an artist with national funding, the highest honour that can be bestowed upon any artist in Norway.

Boine has received other awards as follows:

Awards
| Preceded by first recipient | Recipient of the Áillohaš Music Award; 1993 | Succeeded by Johan Anders Bær |
| Preceded by Arve Tellefsen | Recipient of the Open class Spellemannprisen; 1989 | Succeeded by No Open class award |
| Preceded by Ole Edvard Antonsen | Recipient of the Open class Spellemannprisen; 1993 | Succeeded by No Open class award |
| Preceded by Anne Grete Preus | Recipient of the Open class Gammleng-prisen; 1993 | Succeeded by Maj Britt Andersen |
| Preceded by Arne Dagsvik | Recipient of the Nordlysprisen; 1994 | Succeeded by Bjørn Andor Drage |
| Preceded by Terje Rypdal | Recipient of the Open class Spellemannprisen; 1996 | Succeeded by Nils Petter Molvær |
| Preceded by Solveig Kringlebotn | Recipient of the Norsk kulturråds ærespris 2009 | Succeeded by Tor Åge Bringsværd |
| Preceded by Arve Tellefsen | Recipient of the Spellemannprisen honorary award 2017 | Succeeded by D.D.E. |

=== Memberships ===
Boine is foreign member of the Royal Swedish Academy of Music.

== Discography ==
- Jaskatvuođa Maŋŋá/Etter Stillheten as Mari Boine Persen (Hot Club, 1985)
- Gula Gula (Hør Stammødrenes Stemme) (Iđut, 1989)
- Salmer på Veien Hjem as Mari Boine Persen with Ole Paus and Kari Bremnes (Kirkelig Kulturverksted, 1991)
- Møte i Moskva with Alyans (BMG Ariola, 1992)
- Goaskinviellja/Eagle Brother (Lean, 1993)
- Leahkastin/Unfolding with Roger Ludvigsen, Helge A. Norbakken, Hege Rimestad, Gjermund Silset, and Carlos Z. Quispe (Sonet/Lean, 1994)
- Eallin — Live (Antilles/Lean, 1996)
- Radiant Warmth (Antilles 1996)
- Bálvvoslatjna/Room of Worship as Mari Boine Band (Antilles/Lean, 1998)
- Remixed/Ođđa Hámis, (Jazzland/Lean, 2001)
- Eight Seasons/Gávcci Jahkejuogu (Lean/EmArcy/Universal, 2002)
- Idjagieđas/In the Hand of the Night (Lean/Universal, 2006)
- Kautokeino-Opprøret (Music from the Movie The Kautokeino Rebellion) with Svein Schultz and Herman Rundberg (Sony/ATV Music, 2008)
- It Ain't Necessarily Evil/Bodeš Bat Gal Buot Biros: Mari Boine Remixed Vol. II (EmArcy/Universal, 2008)
- Čuovgga Áirras/Sterna Paradisea (Lean/EmArcy/Universal, 2009)
- Áiggi Askiis – An introduction to Mari Boine (Lean, 2011)
- Gilvve Gollát/Sow Your Gold featuring the Norwegian Radio Orchestra (Universal, 2013)
- See the Woman (MPS, 2017)
- Amame with Bugge Wesseltoft (By Norse Music, 2023)
- Alva (By Norse Music, 2024)

=== Also appears on ===
- One World One Voice (Virgin, 1990)
- A Week in the Real World – Part 1 (Real World, 1991)
- A Week or Two in the Real World (Real World, 1994)
- Beginner's Guide to Scandinavia (Nascente, 2011)
- Nordic Woman (Grappa Music/Fuuse Mousiqi, 2012)

With Jan Garbarek

- Twelve Moons (ECM, 1992)
- Visible World (ECM, 1995)
