= Endless Days (album) =

Studio album by Eberhard Weber
- Released: 2001
- Recorded: April 2000
- Studio: Rainbow Studio; Oslo, Norway
- Genre: Jazz
- Length: 50:19
- Label: ECM; ECM 1748
- Producer: Manfred Eicher

Eberhard Weber chronology
| Pendulum (1993) | Endless Days (2001) | Stages of a Long Journey (2007) |

Endless Days is an album by German double bassist and composer Eberhard Weber recorded in Norway in April 2000 and released on ECM the following year. The quartet features oboist Paul McCandless, pianist Rainer Brüninghaus, and drummer Michael Di Pasqua.

== Reception ==
Professional ratings
Review scores
| Source | Rating |
|---|---|
| AllMusic | 2.5/5 stars |
| The Penguin Guide to Jazz Recordings | 3/4 stars |

The AllMusic review by David R. Adler awarded the album 2½ stars, stating, "Weber's new compositions involve little improvisation and a steadfast avoidance of typical jazz vocabulary. Evocative and thoroughly composed, these tracks have something of a European classical, chamber jazz feel... Well done and moving at times, but a bit mild and innocuous overall."

All About Jazz noted "Endless Days occupies a distinct niche in the accumulating body of ECM records with sparse, reverberant sound and stark, often melancholy themes. The "composed" aspect of the record offers a degree of formalism that sets it apart from some of the more improvised music on the label."

== Track listing ==
All compositions by Eberhard Weber

| No. | Title | Length |
|---|---|---|
| 1. | "Concerto for Bass" | 6:09 |
| 2. | "French Diary" | 6:46 |
| 3. | "Solo for Bass" | 3:39 |
| 4. | "Nuit Blanche" | 4:45 |
| 5. | "A Walk in the Garrigue" | 3:28 |
| 6. | "Concerto for Piano" | 4:46 |
| 7. | "Endless Days" | 8:35 |
| 8. | "The Last Stage of a Long Journey" | 9:20 |

== Personnel ==
- Eberhard Weber – bass
- Paul McCandless – oboe, English horn, bass clarinet, soprano saxophone
- Rainer Brüninghaus – piano, keyboards
- Michael Di Pasqua – drums, percussion
