= Brynjar Hoff =

Norwegian oboist

- Born: 1 October 1940 (age 85); Orkdal Municipality, Norway
- Occupation: Oboist
- Relatives: Kari Diesen (mother-in-law); Ernst Diesen (father-in-law)
- Awards: Spellemannprisen (1973); Gammleng Award (1984); Oslo City art award (1989); King's Medal of Merit in gold (1999)

Brynjar Hoff (born 1 October 1940) is a Norwegian oboist.

Hoff was born in Orkdal Municipality to organists Erling Hoff and Magnhild Bergljot Bakken. He was associated with the Trondheim Symphony Orchestra 1955–1958, the Norwegian National Opera and Ballet 1958–1965, and the Oslo Philharmonic 1965–1985, and was later freelance musician. His awards include Spellemannprisen from 1973, the Oslo City art award from 1989, and the King's Medal of Merit in gold from 1999.
