= Eberhard Weber =

German double bassist and composer (born 1940)

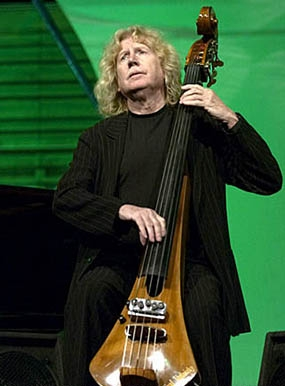
- Eberhard Weber in Lucerne, Switzerland

Background information
- Born: 22 January 1940 (age 86); Stuttgart, Germany
- Genres: Jazz
- Occupations: Bassist, composer
- Instruments: Electric upright bass Double bass, cello
- Years active: 1962–2007
- Label: ECM
- Website: Eberhard Weber on ECM

Eberhard Weber is a German double bassist and composer. As a bass player, he is known for his highly distinctive tone and phrasing. Weber's compositions blend chamber jazz, European classical music, minimalism and ambient music, and are regarded as characteristic examples of the ECM Records sound.

== Early life ==
Weber was born on January 22, 1940, in Stuttgart Germany. His father was a music teacher which meant that Weber received classical music training growing up, beginning on the cello at 6 years old. He began to play the double bass in high school when he was 16 years old. His music teacher wanted someone to play the bass and Weber volunteered.

Early on in Weber's musical journey, he met pianist Wolfgang Dauner with whom he would work for many years throughout his career. They met while both were playing at the Düsseldorf Amateur Jazz Festival.

== Career ==
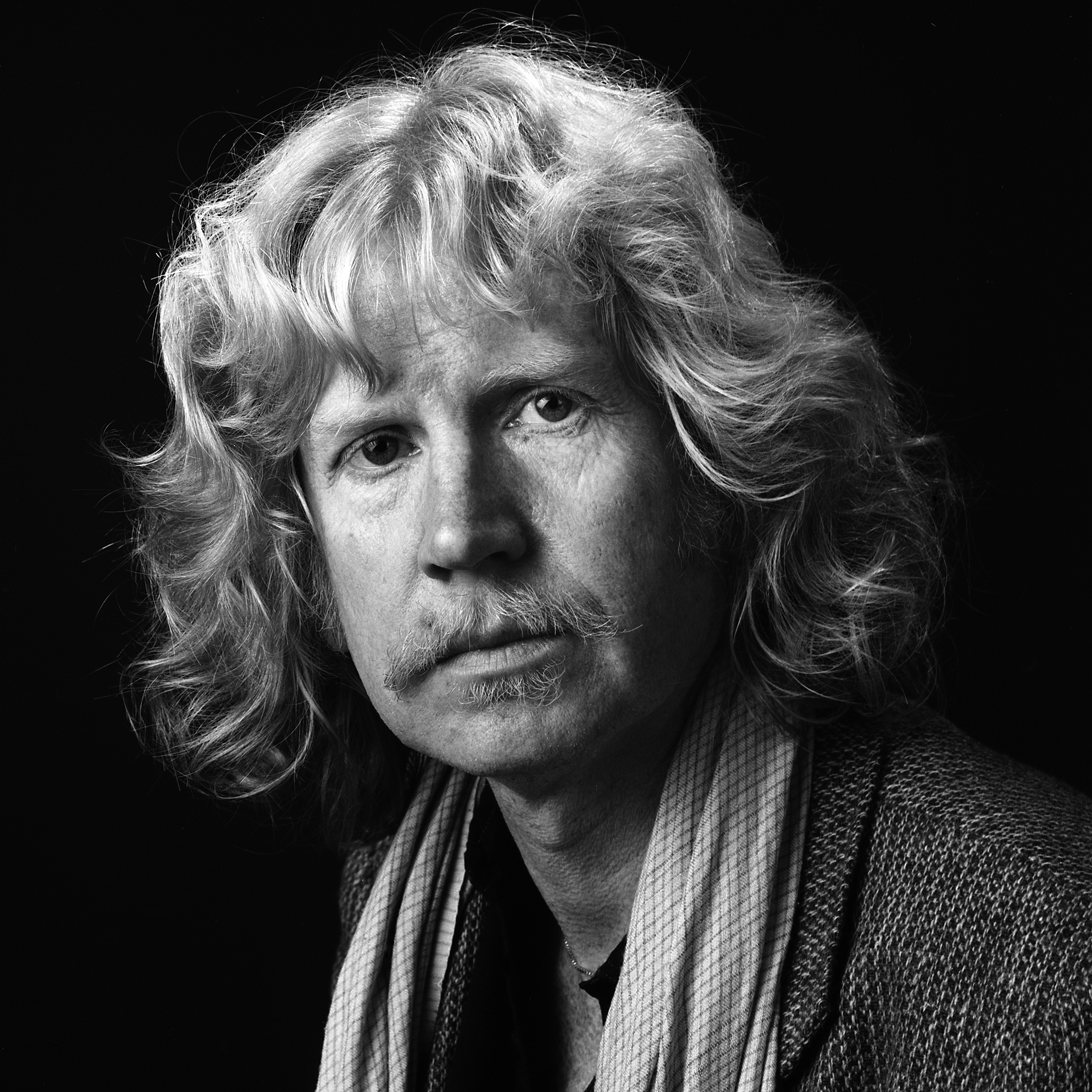
Eberhard Weber - Portrait by Gert Chesi

Weber began recording in the early 1960s, and released The Colours of Chloë (ECM 1042), his first record under his own name, in 1973. In addition to his career as a musician, he also worked for many years as a television and theater director.

Weber joined the band Spectrum alongside musician Dave Pike and Volker Kriegel. He left the band soon after joining because he was "becoming dissatisfied with the rock-oriented direction of the band." He also wanted to experiment with the solid-body electric double bass that he had started playing. He was an early proponent of the instrument, adding a fifth string, which he has played regularly since the early 1970s.

From the early 1960s to the early 1970s, Weber's closest musical association was with pianist Wolfgang Dauner. Their many mutual projects were diverse, from mainstream jazz to jazz-rock fusion to avant-garde sound experiments. During this period, Weber also played and recorded with pianists Hampton Hawes and Mal Waldron, guitarists Baden Powell de Aquino and Joe Pass, The Mike Gibbs Orchestra, violinist Stephane Grappelli, and many others.

Starting with The Colours of Chloë, Weber has released 13 more records under his own name, all on ECM. The ECM association also led to collaborations with other ECM recording artists such as Gary Burton (Ring, 1974; Passengers, 1976), Ralph Towner (Solstice, 1975; Solstice/Sound and Shadows, 1977), Pat Metheny (Watercolors, 1977), and Jan Garbarek (10 recordings between 1978 and 1998).

In the mid-1970s Weber formed his own group, Colours, with Charlie Mariano (soprano saxophone, flutes), Rainer Brüninghaus (piano, synthesizer) and Jon Christensen (drums). After their first recording, Yellow Fields (1975), Christensen left and was replaced by John Marshall. The group toured extensively and recorded two further records, Silent Feet (1977) and Little Movements (1980), before disbanding.

Since the early 1980s, Weber has regularly collaborated with the British singer-songwriter Kate Bush, playing on four of her last six studio albums (The Dreaming, 1982; Hounds of Love, 1985; The Sensual World, 1989; Aerial, 2005).

During the 1980s, Weber toured with Barbara Thompson's jazz ensemble Paraphernalia.

Since 1990, Weber's touring has been limited, and he has had only two new recordings under his own name: The 2001 release Endless Days is an elemental fusion of jazz and classical music flavors, fitting well the moniker chamber jazz. His main touring activity during that period was as a regular member of the Jan Garbarek Group. On the occasion of his 65th birthday, in March, 2005 he recorded Stages of a Long Journey, a live concert with the Stuttgart Radio Symphony Orchestra and featuring Gary Burton, Wolfgang Dauner and Jan Garbarek. In 2009 ECM also re-released his albums Yellow Fields, Silent Feet and Little Movements as a 3-CD collection titled "Colours".

Weber has used text from the book Watership Down by Richard Adams for the names of his compositions and albums, on at least five occasions. Examples include "Silent Feet" and "Eyes That Can See in the Dark" from the Silent Feet album; "Often in the Open" from the Later That Evening album; and "Quiet Departures" and "Fluid Rustle" on the Fluid Rustle album.

== Medical issues ==
On April 23, 2007, Weber suffered a stroke while on tour with the Jan Garbarek Group, which he had been a part of for 25 years. Weber stated that he had felt "something indefinable going on". Weber called his manager and paramedics to examine him in his hotel room and they found nothing of significance to be wrong. Weber continued on to his soundcheck and cites "unusual intonation problems". This led Weber to go to the hospital to be examined again. Weber recounts his experience in his autobiography, saying that the hospital lost power multiple times during his stay, and that he was unable to get an MRI until the following day due to safety concerns caused by the unstable power. The MRI revealed that he had suffered a stroke.

Weber writes about his experience immediately following his stroke, recounting his physical therapy and saying that he thought he would be healthy and able to play again for the upcoming leg of the tour. However this was not the case and Weber has not been able to play the bass since. He was replaced in the Jan Garbarek Group by Yuri Daniel in early 2007.

In a January 2010 interview with Die Welt, he spoke about his medical condition and future projects.

== Post-stroke career ==
Weber was awarded the Albert Mangelsdorff-Preis in November 2009. A box set of his 1970s works was released by ECM Records the same month.

Weber's latest albums, Résumé (2012) and Encore (2015) comprise solos from his performances worldwide with The Jan Garbarek Group, overdubbed with keyboards/treatments by Weber, saxophone by Garbarek, and flügelhorn by Ack Van Rooyen.

His autobiography, Résumé, was published in 2015. An English translation by Heidi Kirk - Eberhard Weber: A German Jazz Story - was published in October 2021.

== Influence ==
In 2021, the 13-minute recording Eberhard by the late Lyle Mays was posthumously released, revised from a 2009 composition debuted at Lawrence University and written as a tribute to Weber's influential compositional style. It was awarded a Grammy for Best Instrumental Composition in 2022.

== Discography ==
=== As leader ===
- The Colours of Chloë (ECM, 1974) – rec. 1973
- Yellow Fields (ECM, 1976) – rec. 1975
- The Following Morning (ECM, 1976)
- Silent Feet (ECM, 1978) – rec. 1977
- Fluid Rustle (ECM, 1979)
- Little Movements (ECM, 1980)
- Later That Evening (ECM, 1982)
- Chorus (ECM, 1985) – rec. 1984
- Orchestra (ECM, 1988)
- Pendulum (ECM, 1993)
- Endless Days (ECM, 2001) – rec. 2000
- Stages of a Long Journey (ECM, 2007) – live rec. 2005
- Résumé (ECM, 2012) – live rec. 1990–2007
- Encore (ECM, 2015) – live rec. 1990–2007
- Hommage à Eberhard Weber (ECM, 2015) – live
- Once Upon a Time (Live in Avignon) (ECM, 2021) – live rec. 1994

Compilations

- Works (ECM, 1985)
- Rarum: Selected Recordings (ECM, 2004)
- Colours (ECM, 2010) – reissue compiling Yellow Fields, Silent Feet and Little Movements

Collaboration
With Benny Bailey, Siggi Schwab and Lala Kovacev

- Islands (Enja, 1977)

=== As sideman ===
With Gary Burton

- Ring (ECM, 1974)
- Passengers (ECM, 1976)

With Kate Bush

- The Dreaming (EMI, 1982)
- Hounds of Love (EMI, 1985)
- The Sensual World (EMI, 1989)
- Aerial (EMI, 2005)

With Wolfgang Dauner

- Dream Talk (CBS, 1964)
- Free Action (SABA, 1967)
- The Oimels (MPS, 1969)
- Output (ECM, 1970)

With Jan Garbarek

- Photo with Blue Sky, White Cloud, Wires, Windows and a Red Roof (ECM, 1979) – rec. 1978
- Paths, Prints (ECM, 1982) – rec. 1981
- Wayfarer (ECM, 1983)
- It's OK to Listen to the Gray Voice (ECM, 1985) – rec. 1984
- All Those Born with Wings (ECM, 1987) – rec. 1986
- Legend of the Seven Dreams (ECM, 1988)
- I Took Up the Runes (ECM, 1990)
- Twelve Moons (ECM, 1993) – rec. 1992
- Visible World (ECM, 1996) – rec. 1995
- Rites (ECM, 1998)

With Michael Naura

- Call (MPS, 1971)
- Vanessa (ECM, 1975) – rec. 1974

With Baden Powell

- Poema en Guitar (SABA, 1968)
- Solitude on Guitar (MPS, 1971) – rec. 1970

With Ralph Towner

- Solstice (ECM, 1975) – rec. 1974
- Sound and Shadows (ECM, 1977)

With others
See "External links" below for a complete discography

- Hampton Hawes, Hamps' Piano (SABA, 1967)
- Joe Pass, Intercontinental (MPS, 1970)
- Mal Waldron, The Call (JAPO, 1971)
- Ernest Ranglin, Ranglypso (MPS, 1976)
- Stephane Grappelli, Afternoon in Paris (1971)
- The Singers Unlimited with Art Van Damme, Invitation (MPS, 1974)
- Pat Metheny, Watercolors (ECM, 1977)
- Manfred Schoof Orchestra, Reflections (Mood, 1984)
- United Jazz + Rock Ensemble, The Break Even Point and United Live Opus Sechs (Mood, 1984)
- Graeme Revell, Body of Evidence: Motion Picture Soundtrack (Milan, 1993)

== See also ==
- Electric upright bass
