= Ring (Gary Burton album) =

Studio album by the Gary Burton Quintet with Eberhard Weber
- Released: 1974
- Recorded: July 23–24, 1974
- Genre: Jazz
- Length: 37:10
- Label: ECM 1051 ST
- Producer: Manfred Eicher

Gary Burton chronology
Seven Songs for Quartet and Chamber Orchestra (1974)	Ring (1974)	Matchbook (1975)

Eberhard Weber chronology
The Colours of Chloë (1974)	Ring (1974)	Yellow Fields (1976)

Professional ratings
Review scores
Source	Rating
AllMusic	4/5 stars
The Penguin Guide to Jazz Recordings	3/4 stars
The Rolling Stone Jazz Record Guide	4/5 stars

Ring is an album by the Gary Burton Quintet with Eberhard Weber, recorded over two days in July 1974 and released on ECM later that year. The quintet consists of guitarists Mick Goodrick and Pat Metheny and rhythm section Steve Swallow and Bob Moses.

== Track listing ==
Side I
No.	Title	Writer(s)	Length
1.	"Mevlevia"	Mick Goodrick	6:01
2.	"Unfinished Sympathy"	Mike Gibbs	3:03
3.	"Tunnel of Love"	Gibbs	5:30
4.	"Intrude"	Gibbs	4:47
Total length:			19:21

Side II
No.	Title	Writer(s)	Length
1.	"Silent Spring"	Carla Bley	10:37
2.	"The Colours of Chloë"	Eberhard Weber	7:12
Total length:			17:49 37:10

== Personnel ==
- Gary Burton – vibraharp
- Eberhard Weber – double bass
- Mick Goodrick – guitar
- Pat Metheny – guitar, electric 12-string guitar
- Steve Swallow – bass guitar
- Bob Moses – percussion
