= The Colours of Chloë =

Studio album by Eberhard Weber
- Released: 1974
- Recorded: December 1973
- Studio: Tonstudio Bauer; Ludwigsburg, W. Germany
- Genre: Third stream; chamber jazz; fusion
- Length: 39:56
- Label: ECM 1042 ST
- Producer: Manfred Eicher

Eberhard Weber chronology
The Colours of Chloë (1974)	Ring (Gary Burton album) (1974)

The Colours of Chloë is the debut album by German double bassist and composer Eberhard Weber, recorded in December 1973 and released on ECM the following year.

== Reception ==
The AllMusic review by David R. Adler awarded the album 4½ stars, stating, "Eberhard Weber's first record remains his most well-known and influential. An ambitious work of what might be called symphonic jazz, The Colours of Chloë helped to define the ECM sound—picturesque, romantic, at times rhythmically involved, at others minimalistic and harmonically abstruse... People will disagree about whether The Colours of Chloë stands the test of time, but Weber's aesthetic played a significant role in the creative music of the '70s, attracting a fair share of emulators."

Professional ratings
Review scores
Source	Rating
AllMusic	4.5/5 stars
The Rolling Stone Jazz Record Guide	4/5 stars
The Penguin Guide to Jazz Recordings	3.5/4 stars

== Track listing ==
All compositions by Eberhard Weber.

Side I
No.	Title	Length
1.	"More Colours"	6:44
2.	"The Colours of Chloë"	7:49
3.	"An Evening with Vincent Van Ritz"	5:51
Total length:		20:24

Side II
No.	Title	Length
1.	"No Motion Picture"	19:32
Total length:		19:32 39:56

== Personnel ==
- Eberhard Weber – bass, cello, ocarina, voice
- Rainer Brüninghaus – piano, synthesizer
- Peter Giger – drums
- Ralf Hübner – drums (track 2)
- Ack van Rooyen – fluegelhorn
- Gisela Schäuble – voice
- celli of the Südfunk Orchestra, Stuttgart
